= 2001 Michigan Wolverines football team =

American college football season

2001 Michigan Wolverines football

Florida Citrus Bowl, L 17–45 vs. Tennessee
- Conference: Big Ten Conference

Ranking
- Coaches: No. 20
- AP: No. 20
- Record: 8–4 (6–2 Big Ten)
- Head coach: Lloyd Carr (7th season)
- Offensive coordinator: Stan Parrish (2nd season)
- Offensive scheme: Multiple
- Defensive coordinator: Jim Herrmann (5th season)
- Base defense: Multiple
- MVP: Marquise Walker
- Captains: Eric Brackins; Shawn Thompson
- Home stadium: Michigan Stadium

2001 Big Ten Conference football standings
	Conf.			Overall
Team	W		L	W		L
No. 12 Illinois $	7	–	1	10	–	2
No. 20 Michigan	6	–	2	8	–	4
Ohio State	5	–	3	7	–	5
Iowa	4	–	4	7	–	5
Purdue	4	–	4	6	–	6
Penn State	4	–	4	5	–	6
Indiana	4	–	4	5	–	6
Michigan State	3	–	5	7	–	5
Wisconsin	3	–	5	5	–	7
Minnesota	2	–	6	4	–	7
Northwestern	2	–	6	4	–	7
$ – BCS representative as conference champion; Rankings from AP Poll

The 2001 Michigan Wolverines football team was an American football team that represented the University of Michigan as a member of the Big Ten Conference during the 2001 NCAA Division I-A football season. In their seventh year under head coach was Lloyd Carr, the Wolverines compiled an 8–4 record (6–2 in conference games), outscored opponents by a total of 303 to 192, and finished second in the Big Ten. They lost to Tennessee in the Florida Citrus Bowl.

The team's statistical leaders included quarterback John Navarre with 2,195 passing yards, wide receiver Marquise Walker with 81 receptions for 1,043 yards, running back B. J. Askew with 831 rushing yards, and placekicker Hayden Epstein with 71 points scored (35 extra points, 12 field goals).

Terrell and linebacker Larry Foote received first-team All-America honors. Five Michigan players received first-team honors on the 2001 All-Big Ten Conference football team: Walker (Coaches-1, Media-1); guard Jonathan Goodwin (Coaches-2, Media-1); defensive lineman Dan Rumishek (Media-1); and linebacker Larry Foote (Coaches-1, Media-1).

== Schedule ==
Date	Time	Opponent	Rank	Site	TV	Result	Attendance
September 1	3:30 p.m.	Miami (OH)*	No. 12	Michigan Stadium; Ann Arbor, MI	ESPN	W 31–13	109,676
September 8	3:30 p.m.	at No. 15 Washington*	No. 11	Husky Stadium; Seattle, WA	ABC	L 18–23	74,080
September 22	12:10 p.m.	Western Michigan*	No. 20	Michigan Stadium; Ann Arbor, MI	ESPN	W 38–21	109,837
September 29	3:30 p.m.	No. 22 Illinois	No. 17	Michigan Stadium; Ann Arbor, MI (rivalry)	ABC	W 45–20	107,085
October 6	3:30 p.m.	at Penn State	No. 15	Beaver Stadium; University Park, PA (rivalry)	ABC	W 20–0	107,879
October 13	12:10 p.m.	No. 17 Purdue^{†}	No. 12	Michigan Stadium; Ann Arbor, MI	ESPN	W 24–10	110,450
October 27	3:30 p.m.	at Iowa	No. 8	Kinnick Stadium; Iowa City, IA	ABC	W 32–26	70,397
November 3	3:30 p.m.	at Michigan State	No. 6	Spartan Stadium; East Lansing, MI (rivalry)	ABC	L 24–26	75,262
November 10	12:10 p.m.	Minnesota	No. 12	Michigan Stadium; Ann Arbor, MI (Little Brown Jug)	ESPN2	W 31–10	110,828
November 17	3:30 p.m.	at Wisconsin	No. 11	Camp Randall Stadium; Madison, WI	ABC	W 20–17	79,633
November 24	1:00 p.m.	Ohio State	No. 11	Michigan Stadium; Ann Arbor, MI (The Game)	ABC	L 20–26	111,571
January 1, 2002	1:00 p.m.	vs. No. 8 Tennessee*	No. 17	Florida Citrus Bowl; Orlando, FL (Florida Citrus Bowl)	ABC	L 17–45	59,653
*Non-conference game; ^{†}Homecoming; Rankings from AP Poll released prior to the game; All times are in Eastern time

== Game summaries ==
=== Minnesota ===
Team	1	2	3	4	Total
Minnesota	0	10	0	0	10
• Michigan	7	7	10	7	31

- Date: November 10
- Location: Michigan Stadium, Ann Arbor, MI
- TV announcers (ESPN2): Mark Jones (Play-by-play), Chris Spielman (Color) & Holly Rowe (Sideline)

Scoring summary
Q1	7:58	MICH	Askew 11 yard run (Epstein kick)	MICH 7–0
Q2	11:21	MINN	Johnson 15 yard pass from Abdul-Khaliq (Nystrom kick)	Tie 7–7
Q2	7:20	MICH	Askew 2 yard run (Epstein kick)	MICH 14–7
Q2	:00	MINN	Nystrom 40 yard field goal	MICH 14–10
Q3	12:20	MICH	Bell 19 yard run (Epstein kick)	MICH 21–10
Q3	6:17	MICH	Epstein 41 yard field goal	MICH 24–10
Q4	14:49	MICH	Perry 5 yard run (Epstein kick)	MICH 31–10

=== Wisconsin ===
Team	1	2	3	4	Total
• Michigan	7	7	3	3	20
Wisconsin	7	0	10	0	17

- Date: November 17
- Location: Camp Randall Stadium, Madison, WI
- Game attendance: 79,633
- TV announcers (ABC): Brent Musburger (Play-by-play), Gary Danielson (Color) & Jack Arute (Sideline)

Scoring summary
Q1	9:30	WISC	Bollinger 1 yard run (Morse kick)	WISC 7–0
Q1	0:45	MICH	Dubuc 10 yard pass from Navarre (Epstein kick)	Tie 7–7
Q2	8:28	MICH	Jackson 43 yard blocked punt return (Epstein kick)	MICH 14–7
Q3	8:30	MICH	Epstein 25 yard field goal	MICH 17–7
Q3	5:15	WISC	Davis 10 yard run (Neuser kick)	MICH 17–14
Q3	2:03	WISC	Neuser 46 yard field goal	Tie 17–17
Q4	0:14	MICH	Epstein 31 yard field goal	MICH 20–17

== Roster ==
2001 Michigan Wolverines football team roster
Players
Coaches
Offense

Pos.	#	Name	Class
OL	75	David Baas	So
WR	19	Ronald Bellamy	Jr
WR	80	Braylon Edwards	Fr
OL	78	Jonathan Goodwin	Sr
QB	7	Drew Henson	Jr
TE	83	Bennie Joppru	Jr
QB	16	John Navarre	So
RB	23	Chris Perry	So
OL	74	Demetrius Solomon	Jr
RB	5	David Underwood	Fr
WR	4	Marquise Walker	Sr

Defense

Pos.	#	Name	Class
LB	43	Carl Diggs	Jr
LB	17	Larry Foote	Sr
LB	6	Victor Hobson	Sr
CB	3	Todd Howard	Sr
CB	20	Marlin Jackson	Fr
FS	2	Cato June	Jr
LB	58	Roy Manning	So
DL	53	Shantee Orr	Jr
DE	85	Dave Spytek	Fr
LB	31	John Spytek	Jr
DE	13	Larry Stevens	So

Special teams

Pos.	#	Name	Class

Head coach

- Lloyd Carr

Coordinators/assistant coaches

Legend

- (C) Team captain
- (S) Suspended
- (I) Ineligible
- Injured
- Redshirt

Roster

== Statistical achievements ==
On October 27, Larry Foote earned a share of the single-game conference record of 7 tackles for a loss, becoming the third conference athlete to do so. He also holds a share of the national record, becoming the third player to do so since the NCAA recognized it as a stat.

Marquise Walker was the Big Ten receiving statistical champion with 7.5 receptions per conference game and 7.2 reception per game. On September 8 against Washington and November 24 against Ohio State he posted 15 receptions breaking the record of 12 set in 1958 by Brad Myers and tied in 1996 by Tai Streets. The record still stands. During the season, he set the school record for single-season receptions (86), surpassing Jack Clancy's 1966 record of 76; career receptions (176), surpassing Anthony Carter's 161 set in 1982; consecutive games with a reception (32), surpassing Mercury Hayes's 30 set in 1995; and single-season reception yards, surpassing David Terrell's record set the prior season. Braylon Edwards surpassed all of these records in 2004.

The team earned the Big Ten rushing defense statistical championships for all games by holding opponents to 89.1 yards per game. The team also earned the Big Ten rushing defense statistical championships for conference games by holding opponents to 95.4 yards per game. The team earned the Big Ten passing defense statistical championships for conference games by holding conference opponents to 190.8 yards per game, although Ohio State won the title for all games. They also ranked first in passing efficiency defense for both conference games (103.5) and with Ohio State leading for all games. The team led the conference in total defense for conference games (286.1) and all games (316.4). The team led the Big Ten Conference in scoring defense for conference games (16.9 points per game) and all games (19.8). They were the conference leaders in quarterback sacks for conference games (4.4 sacks per game) and all games (4.2 sacks per game).

John Navarre set the school single-season pass attempts record of 385, surpassing 350 by Tom Brady in 1998. He would rebreak his own record in each of the next two seasons.

== Awards and honors ==
- Co-captain: Eric Brackins, Shawn Thompson
- All-Americans: Larry Foote, Marquise Walker
- All-Conference: Larry Foote, Jonathan Goodwin, Dan Rumishek, Marquise Walker
- Most Valuable Player: Marquise Walker
- Meyer Morton Award: Bill Seymour
- John Maulbetsch Award: Chris Perry
- Frederick Matthei Award: Ronald Bellamy
- Dick Katcher Award: Shantee Orr
- Arthur Robinson Scholarship Award: Jake Frysinger
- Hugh Rader Jr. Award: Kurt Anderson
- Robert P. Ufer Award: Eric Brackins
- Roger Zatkoff Award: Larry Foote

== Coaching staff ==
- Head coach: Lloyd Carr
- Assistant coaches: Teryl Austin, Erik Campbell, Jim Herrmann, Brady Hoke, Fred Jackson, Terry Malone, Andy Moeller, Bobby Morrison, Stan Parrish
- Staff: Scott Draper, Mark Ouimet, Kelly Cox
- Trainer: Paul Schmidt
- Managers: Nate Bentz, Joe Harper, Craig Hisey, Brad Hoffman, Chris Lemaster, Adam Jahnke, Matt Kernen, Maggie Malone, Katie McNall, Craig Podolski, Rick Polanco, Brian Resutek, Victor Soto, Davon Wilson
