= Roy Roundtree =

American football player and coach (born 1989)

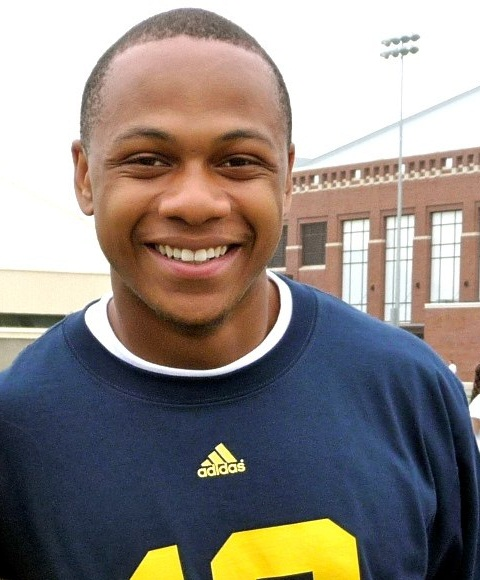
- Roundtree in 2011

Current position
- Title: Wide receivers coach
- Team: Temple Owls
- Conference: AAC

Biographical details
- Born: March 7, 1989 (age 37)

Playing career
- 2008–2012: Michigan
- 2013: Cincinnati Bengals
- 2015: Colorado Ice
- Position: Wide receiver

Coaching career (HC unless noted)
- 2015: CSU Pueblo (WR)
- 2016: Limestone (WR/RC)
- 2017: Indiana State (WR)
- 2018–2019: Michigan (GA)
- 2020–2022: Grand Valley State (WR)
- 2023: McNeese State (WR)
- 2024: Miami (OH) (WR)
- 2025–present: Temple (WR)

Accomplishments and honors

Awards
- Sporting News Big Ten All-Freshman team (2009); Second-team All-Big Ten (2010)

Roy Randolph Roundtree (born March 7, 1989) is an American former football wide receiver and current wide receivers coach for Temple. He was a 2013 preseason member of the Cincinnati Bengals and played college football for the Michigan Wolverines football team where he spent his redshirt senior season with the 2012 team. In 2012, he was an All-Big Ten honorable mention selection. He was a 2011 Fred Biletnikoff Award preseason watchlist honoree. He was a Fred Biletnikoff Award preseason watchlist honoree in 2010, and set Michigan's single-game receiving record with nine catches for 246 yards against Illinois that November. Roundtree was the team's leading receiver in both the 2009 and 2010 seasons. He finished first in the Big Ten Conference in receiving yards in 2010 for Conference games, and was a second team All Conference selection. While in high school, he was named the 2007 Ohio Division II Offensive Player of the Year.

== Early life ==
Roundtree started playing football on the Pee-Wee Dayton Flames in first grade. He played on the team until junior high, joined by his Michigan teammate Michael Shaw, who, because he was eight months older than Roundtree, played in a different level. Roundtree was a two-year starter at Belmont High School in Dayton, Ohio before he transferred to Trotwood-Madison High School, where the team's head football coach was retired National Football League player Maurice Douglass.

As a freshman, he earned Dayton Daily News Athlete of the Week honors, but in 2004–05, Belmont was classified as an "academic emergency" by the state of Ohio because over a 25% of the students were considered to be "students with disabilities", and the school's standardized test scores were over 50 percent lower than the state benchmarks. With the dismal academic situation and a mediocre athletic program, Belmont left Roundtree dissatisfied, and he transferred to Trotwood before his junior year, where coach Douglass had earned a reputation for developing college ready football players, and where former Flames teammate Domonick Britt was playing quarterback.

At Trotwood, he was a teammate of Shaw and Brandon Moore who would later join him at Michigan. As a junior in 2006, he posted 48 receptions for 851 yards, and as a senior, he totalled 868 on 52 catches. His four-year totals were 165 receptions for 2,637 yards and 28 touchdowns. As a senior, he was selected to the Division II first-team all-state squad, and named Ohio's offensive player of the year. He was also chosen to play in the Big 33 Football Classic, and ranked as the number 44, 89, and 104 wide receiver in the nation by Rivals.com, Scout.com, and ESPN, respectively. In that same year, Trotwood won their first playoff game since 1981, led by Roundtree's 13 receptions, 203 yards, and game-winning touchdown. Roundtree feels that his best game in high school was a 12-reception, 221-yard, 2-touchdown performance that helped his team overcome a 21–0 deficit.

Roundtree had scholarship offers from Eastern Michigan, Illinois, Purdue, Nebraska and Miami. He was considered a Purdue commit until getting a late scholarship offer from Michigan, which was his preferred school. On signing day, his uncle convinced him to go to Michigan because of its winning tradition. The late switch led Purdue head coach Joe Tiller to cast aspersions on Michigan coach Rich Rodriguez, referring to him as a snake oil salesman.

College recruiting
| Name | Hometown | School | Height | Weight | 40^{‡} | Commit date |
|---|---|---|---|---|---|---|
| Roy Roundtree; WR | Trotwood, Ohio | Belmont/Trotwood-Madison (OH) | 6 ft 1.25 in (1.86 m) | 170 lb (77 kg) | 4.45 | Feb 6, 2008 |
| Roy Roundtree; WR | Recruit ratings: Scout: Rivals: (76) | | | | | |
Overall recruit ranking: Scout: 89 (WR) Rivals: 44 (WR), 17 (OH) ESPN: 104 (WR)
Note: In many cases, Scout, Rivals, 247Sports, On3, and ESPN may conflict in their listings of height and weight.; In these cases, the average was taken. ESPN grades are on a 100-point scale.; Sources: "Michigan Football Commitments". Rivals.; "2008 Michigan Football Commits". Scout.; "ESPN". ESPN.; "Scout.com Team Recruiting Rankings". Scout.; "2008 Team Ranking". Rivals.com.

== College career ==
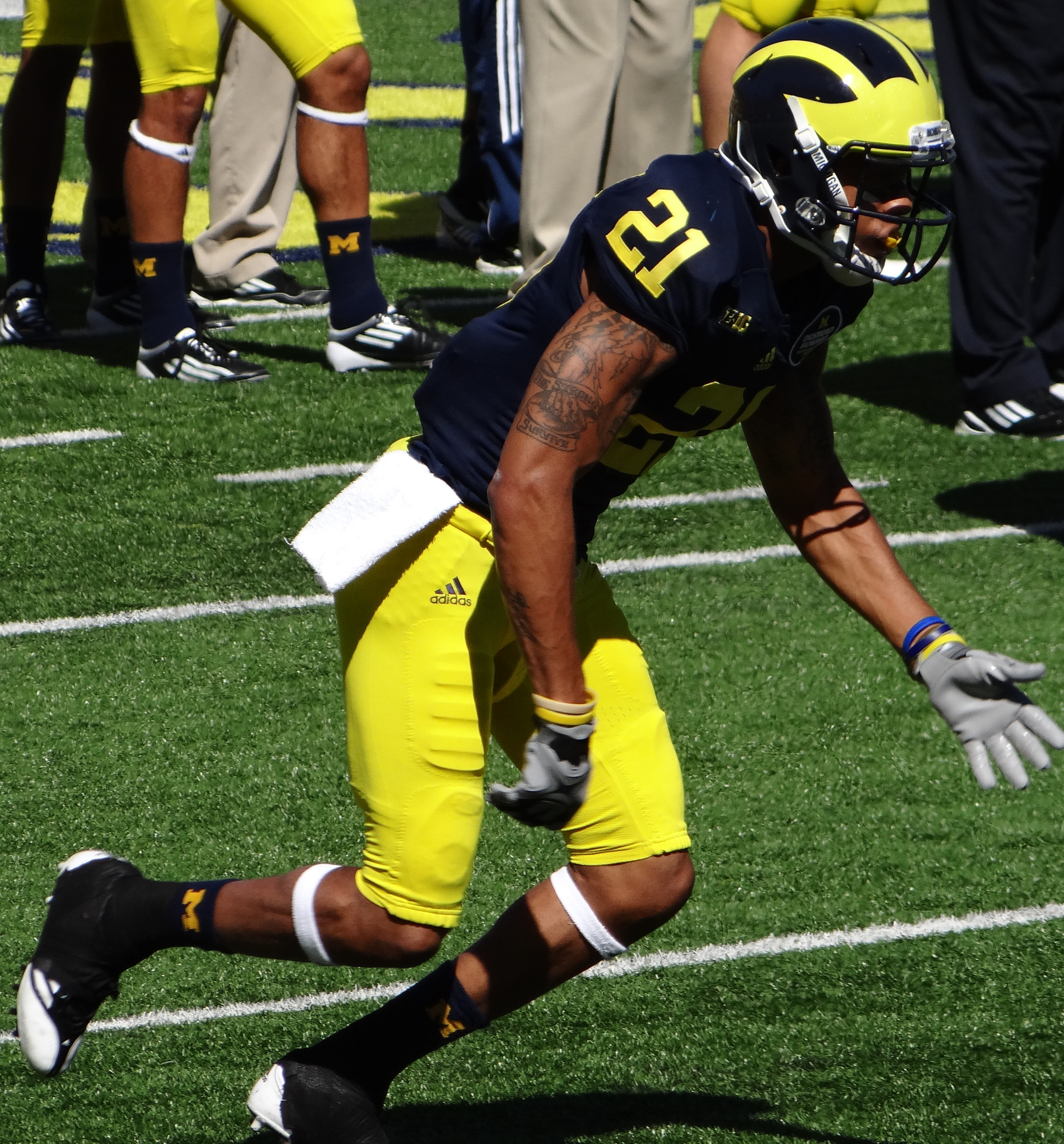
Roundtree at Michigan Stadium, September 2012

Roundtree redshirted for the 2008 season. He made his college debut on September 5, 2009, against the Western Michigan Broncos at Michigan Stadium as a slot receiver. That year, he roomed with Trotwood teammates Shaw and Moore. He had just two receptions in the first eight games of the season while playing as a backup. He became a starter for the team's final four games, and finished as the leading receiver for the 2009 Michigan Wolverines football team in terms of both yards and receptions per game, despite the limited playing time. One of the two early-season receptions occurred on October 3 against Michigan State in the Paul Bunyan Trophy game when he caught the game-tying touchdown with two seconds left in regulation to send the game into overtime. He made his first start on October 31 against the Illinois Fighting Illini as a slot receiver. On November 7, against Purdue he had ten receptions for 126 yards. He also had nine receptions for 116 yards in the November 21, 2009 game against the rival Ohio State Buckeyes. Following the season, he was named a CollegeFootballNews.com Freshman All-America honorable mention, and a Sporting News Freshman All-Big Ten selection.

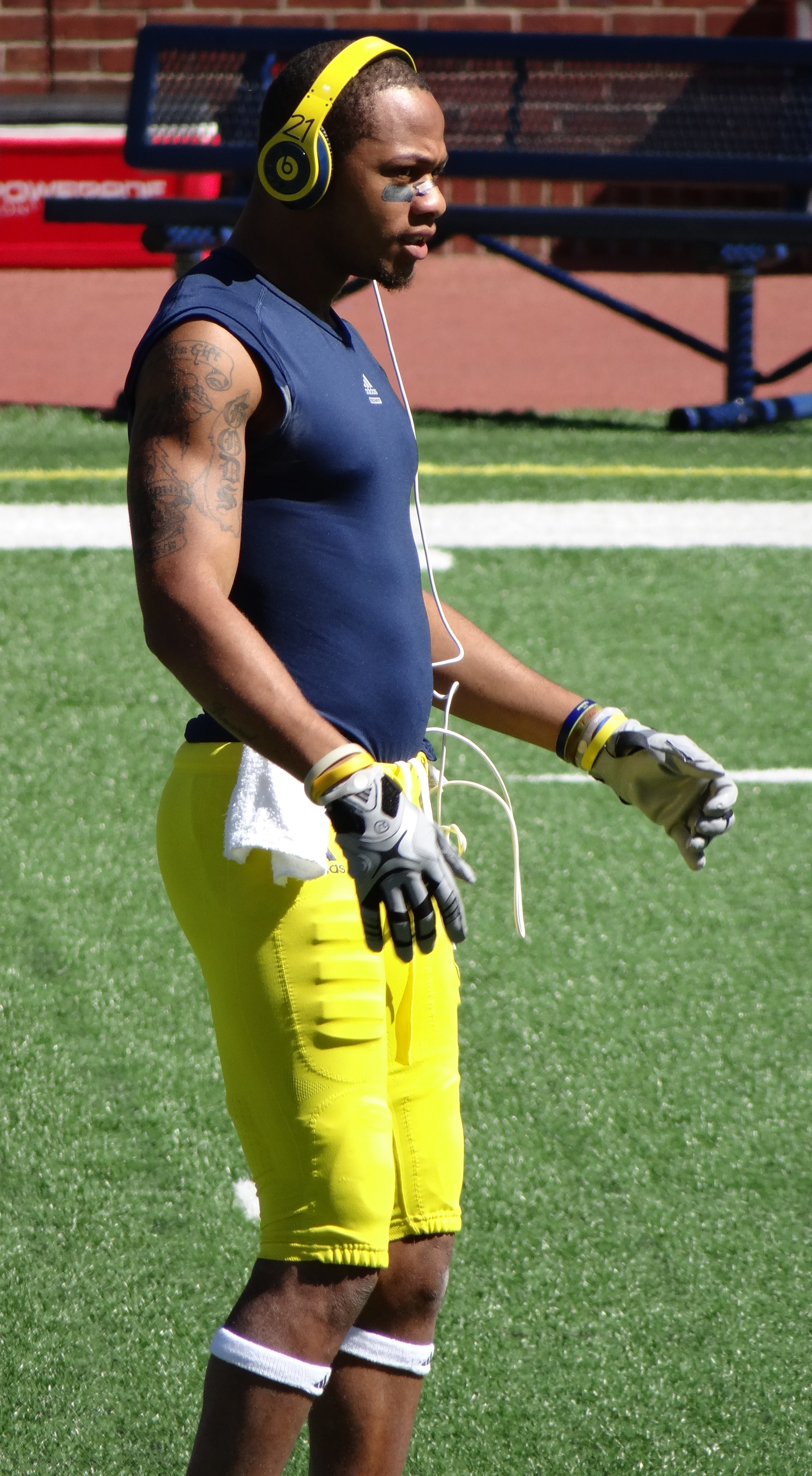
Roundtree with maize and blue Beats

Roundtree made the 2010 preseason watchlist for the Biletnikoff Award, which honors the nation's top wide receiver. He led Michigan's 2010 team in both receptions, and receiving yards. In the September 11 game versus the rival Notre Dame Fighting Irish, his 15-yard reception late in the fourth quarter put the ball on the Notre Dame 2-yard-line. On the next play, Denard Robinson ran in for the game-winning touchdown with 27 seconds remaining. He posted back-to-back 100-yard receiving games on September 25, and October 2, 2010, recording nine receptions for 119 yards in a home game against the Bowling Green Falcons, and five receptions for 126 yards and a touchdown versus the Indiana Hoosiers. At the midpoint of Michigan's 12-game regular season schedule, he ranked fifth in the Big Ten in receptions per game, and seventh in receiving yards. In Michigan's 67–65 victory over Illinois on November 6, Roundtree broke Jack Clancy's all-time Michigan single-game receiving yards record when he caught nine passes for 246 yards and two touchdowns, including a 75-yard touchdown reception on the game's first play from scrimmage. The record stood until October 19, 2013, when Jeremy Gallon posted a Big Ten record 369 yards against Indiana. The performance raised him to fourth in the conference in both yards and receptions (tied) per game, and earned him Co-Big Ten Offensive Player of the Week honors. He ended the 2010 regular season third in the Conference in receiving yards, and fourth in receptions for all games. After a slow start, which included negative one yards receiving in the team's first game, and a total of less than 100 yards in their first three contests, Roundtree led the Big Ten with 83.9 receiving yards per conference game. After the regular season, he was named to the All Conference second team by the media. He finished the year, third in the conference in receiving yards per game (71.92) and fourth in receptions per game (5.54) for all games.

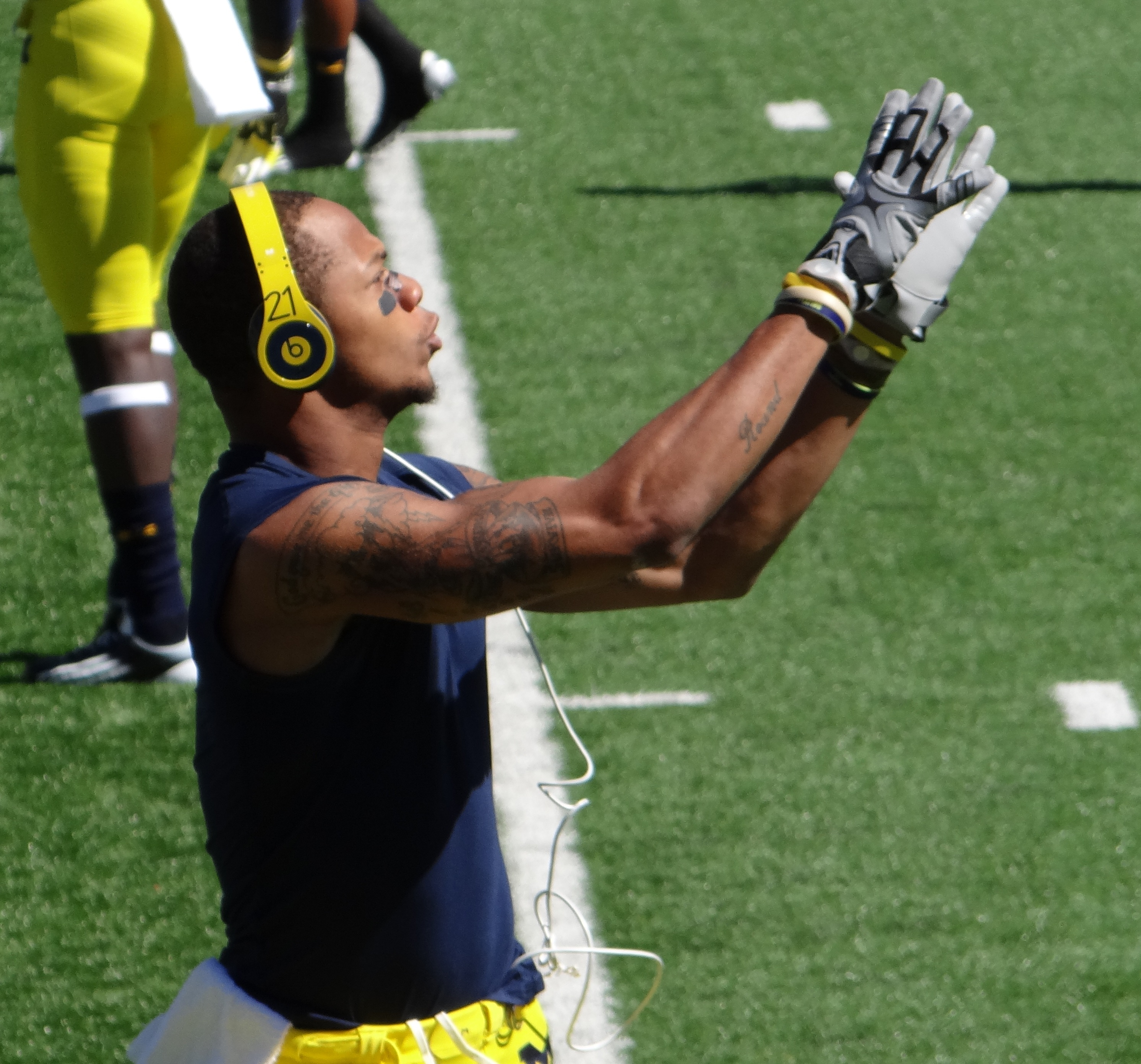
Roundtree during warmups in Ann Arbor

Roundtree repeated as a Biletnikoff Award preseason watchlist honoree in 2011. On September 10, against Notre Dame, during the first night game ever played at Michigan Stadium, his only reception was the game-winning 16-yard touchdown with two seconds remaining in the game. After leading Michigan in pass receptions in 2009 and 2010, his production fell off in 2011. In 2011, Roundtree ranked fourth in receptions for Michigan with 19 catches and third in receiving yards with 355 yards. Following the season, he had offseason knee surgery.

Roundtree followed Junior Hemingway as the second person to wear Desmond Howard's "Michigan Football Legend" jersey number 21. On November 10, 2012, Roundtree recorded 139 receiving yards against Northwestern, including a 53-yard reception to set up the game tying field goal and then a 17-yard reception on the game-winning drive in overtime. Playing in his final game at Michigan Stadium, a 42–17 victory over Iowa, Roundtree caught five passes for 83 yards and a touchdown. Roundtree was an All-Big Ten honorable mention by both the coaches and the media. He posted his four highest receiving yardage totals of the season after Devin Gardner replaced Denard Robinson at quarterback. Roundtree was the second leading receiver on the team with 31 receptions for 580 yards, leading the team with an average of 18.7 yards per catch. Following the season, Roundtree participated in the January 19, 2013 Raycom College Football All-Star Classic, making a 39-yard catch and returning 2 punts.

== Professional career ==
Roundtree signed an undrafted free agent contract with the Cincinnati Bengals following the 2013 NFL draft. He was released during the final roster cut on August 31.

In 2015, Roundtree signed with the Colorado Ice of the Indoor Football League (IFL). Roundtree made his professional debut on March 15, 2015, catching 3 touchdowns, during a 59–40 loss to the Sioux Falls Storm.

== Personal life ==
His father was one of his pee wee football coaches. His mother is Sheila Roundtree. Some of his Michigan teammates call him "Tree", for short. He is the nephew of Jeff Graham.

== See also ==
- Michigan Wolverines football statistical leaders
