= Michigan Wolverines football statistical leaders =

Career leader in passing yards, Chad Henne

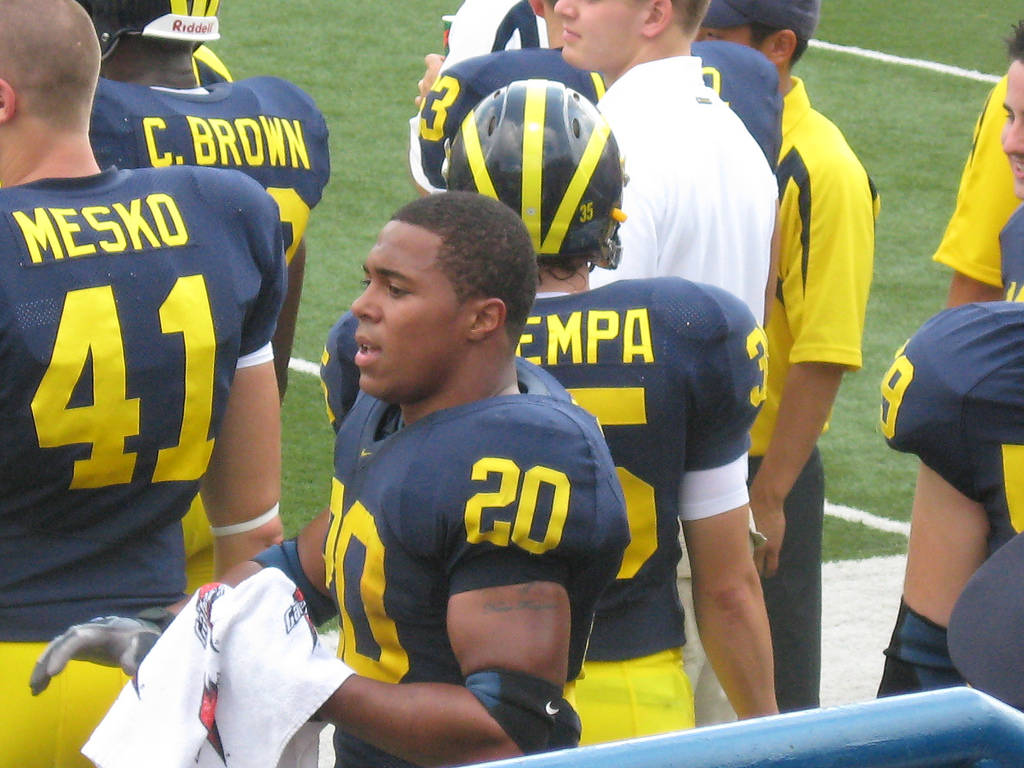
Career leader in rushing yards, Mike Hart

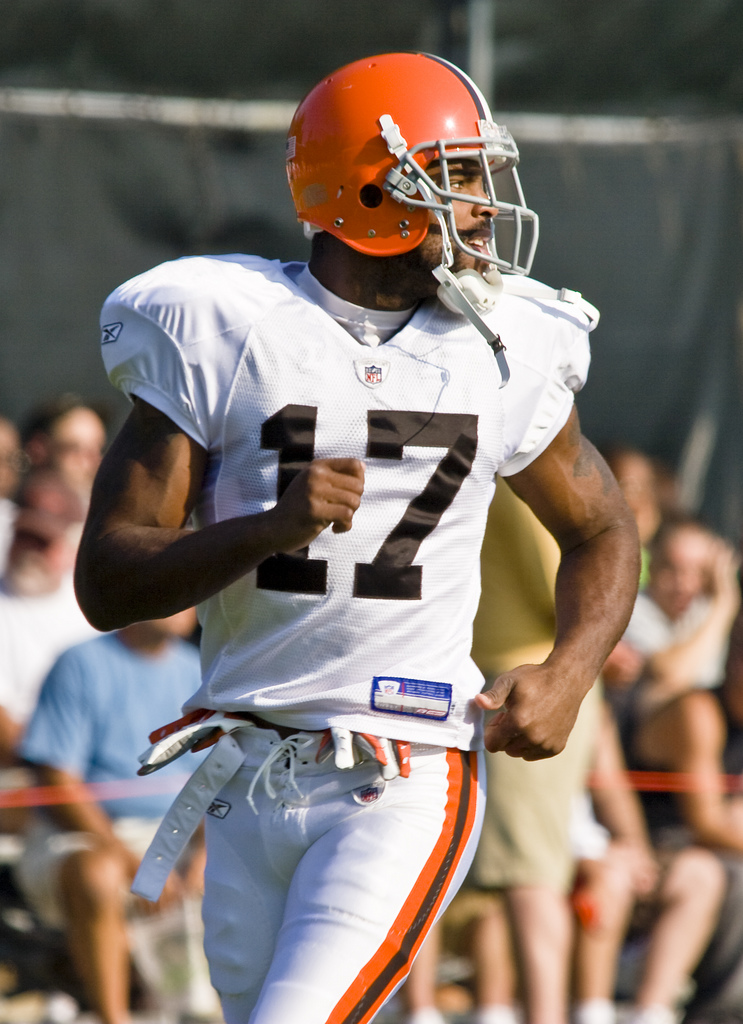
Career leader in receiving yards, Braylon Edwards

The lists of Michigan Wolverines football statistical leaders identify individual statistical leaders of the Michigan Wolverines football program in various offensive categories, including passing, rushing, and receptions. Within those areas, the lists identify single-game, single-season and career leaders in yardage, number (receptions, rushes or passes), and touchdowns. Statistics accumulated after transferring from or before transferring to Michigan are not included here. The Michigan Wolverines football program is a college football team that represents the University of Michigan in the National Collegiate Athletic Association's Big Ten Conference.

Passing leaders. Michigan's career leader in passing yardage is Chad Henne with 9,715 passing yards from 2004 to 2007. Henne also holds the career records in completions (828) and touchdown passes (87). John Navarre holds the records for passing yards in a single season (3,331), set during the 2003 season. Devin Gardner holds the record for passing yards in a single game (503) against Indiana in 2013. Tom Brady holds the school's record for most completions in a game, having completed 34 passes against Alabama in the 2000 Orange Bowl.

Rushing leaders. Michigan's career leader in rushing yards is Mike Hart with 5,040 rushing yards from 2004 to 2007. Hart also holds the career record with 1,050 carries. Tim Biakabutuka holds the single-season record with 1,818 rushing yards during the 1995 season. Ron Johnson holds the single-game record with 347 rushing yards in a game against Wisconsin during the 1967 season. Willie Heston, who played on Fielding H. Yost's "Point-a-Minute" teams from 1901 to 1904, holds the career record for rushing touchdowns with 72. Blake Corum holds the records for most rushing touchdowns in a season (27), setting the record during Michigan’s 2023 national championship campaign. Albert E. Herrnstein owns the single-game touchdown record (7), having set the mark for the 1902 team.

Receiving leaders. Michigan receiving records are dominated by Braylon Edwards who played for Michigan from 2001 to 2004. When Edwards finished, he held the records for most career receiving yards (3,541), receptions (252), and touchdowns (39). In 2004, Edwards also set the single-season records for receiving yards (1,330) and receptions (97). However, in 2013 his single-season record for receiving yards was surpassed by Jeremy Gallon, who finished the season with 1,373 yards. Heisman Trophy winner Desmond Howard holds the single season record with 19 touchdown catches during the 1991 season. Michigan's single-game records are held by Jeremy Gallon (369 receiving yards, Indiana, October 19, 2013), Marquise Walker (15 receptions twice, Ohio State, November 24, 2001 and Washington, September 8, 2001), and Derrick Alexander (4 touchdown receptions, Minnesota, October 24, 1992).

Historical caveats. Although Michigan began competing in intercollegiate football in 1879, the school's official statistical database only tracks offensive statistics since 1949. Definitive tracking of most defensive statistics dates only to 1965, and tracking of sacks did not start until 1979. Field goal statistics have only been included since 1984, and a complete database of field goal statistics (i.e., down to the level of individual games) dates only to 1997.

Because the official database commences in 1949, many statistical achievements are overlooked in these lists. For example, Dick Rifenburg's career receiving statistics are not included in the official database despite the fact that his 16 career and eight single-season touchdowns were recognized as school records until 1980.

Where pre-1949 records are available from reliable sources, they have been included below with yellow shading. Because there is no complete database of pre-1949 records, such records are incomplete and may not be considered "official" records.

With playing seasons extending progressively from relatively short four-games seasons in the 19th century to the current 12-game regular seasons, conference championship games, and bowl games, and with players being eligible to play four years of college football starting in 1972, as well as the NCAA's decision to not count the COVID-affected 2020 season against the athletic eligibility of any football player, the lists tend to be dominated by more recent players.

== Passing ==
=== Completions ===
Career
| Rank | Player | Comp | Years |
|---|---|---|---|
| 1 | Chad Henne | 828 | 2004 2005 2006 2007 |
| 2 | John Navarre | 765 | 2000 2001 2002 2003 |
| 3 | Elvis Grbac | 522 | 1989 1990 1991 1992 |
| 4 | J. J. McCarthy | 482 | 2021 2022 2023 |
| 5 | Devin Gardner | 475 | 2010 2011 2012 2013 2014 |
| 6 | Todd Collins | 457 | 1991 1992 1993 1994 |
| 7 | Tom Brady | 443 | 1996 1997 1998 1999 |
| 8 | Denard Robinson | 427 | 2009 2010 2011 2012 |
| 9 | Shea Patterson | 424 | 2018 2019 |
| 10 | Jim Harbaugh | 387 | 1983 1984 1985 1986 |

Single season
| Rank | Player | Comp | Year |
|---|---|---|---|
| 1 | John Navarre | 270 | 2003 |
| 2 | Jake Rudock | 249 | 2015 |
| 3 | John Navarre | 248 | 2002 |
| 4 | Chad Henne | 240 | 2004 |
| | J. J. McCarthy | 240 | 2023 |
| 6 | Chad Henne | 223 | 2005 |
| 7 | Tom Brady | 214 | 1998 |
| | Tom Brady | 214 | 1999 |
| | Shea Patterson | 214 | 2019 |
| 10 | Shea Patterson | 210 | 2018 |
| | Cade McNamara | 210 | 2021 |

Single game
| Rank | Player | Comp | Year | Opponent |
|---|---|---|---|---|
| 1 | Tom Brady | 34 | 1999 | Alabama |
| 2 | John Navarre | 33 | 2003 | Minnesota |
| | Chad Henne | 33 | 2004 | Minnesota |
| | Jake Rudock | 33 | 2015 | Indiana |
| 5 | Devin Gardner | 32 | 2013 | Ohio State |
| | Joe Milton | 32 | 2020 | Michigan State |
| 7 | Tom Brady | 31 | 1998 | Ohio State |
| 8 | Tom Brady | 30 | 1999 | Michigan State |
| 9 | Todd Collins | 29 | 1992 | Oklahoma State |
| 10 | John Navarre | 28 | 2003 | Oregon |
| | Cade McNamara | 28 | 2021 | Michigan State |
| | J. J. McCarthy | 28 | 2022 | Indiana |

=== Passing yards ===
Career
| Rank | Player | Yards | Years |
|---|---|---|---|
| 1 | Chad Henne | 9,715 | 2004 2005 2006 2007 |
| 2 | John Navarre | 9,254 | 2000 2001 2002 2003 |
| 3 | Elvis Grbac | 6,460 | 1989 1990 1991 1992 |
| 4 | Devin Gardner | 6,336 | 2010 2011 2012 2013 2014 |
| 5 | Denard Robinson | 6,250 | 2009 2010 2011 2012 |
| 6 | J. J. McCarthy | 6,226 | 2021 2022 2023 |
| 7 | Todd Collins | 5,858 | 1991 1992 1993 1994 |
| 8 | Shea Patterson | 5,661 | 2018 2019 |
| 9 | Jim Harbaugh | 5,449 | 1983 1984 1985 1986 |
| 10 | Tom Brady | 5,351 | 1996 1997 1998 1999 |

Single season
| Rank | Player | Yards | Year |
|---|---|---|---|
| 1 | John Navarre | 3,331 | 2003 |
| 2 | Shea Patterson | 3,061 | 2019 |
| 3 | Jake Rudock | 3,017 | 2015 |
| 4 | J. J. McCarthy | 2,991 | 2023 |
| 5 | Devin Gardner | 2,960 | 2013 |
| 6 | John Navarre | 2,905 | 2002 |
| 7 | Chad Henne | 2,743 | 2004 |
| 8 | Jim Harbaugh | 2,729 | 1986 |
| 9 | J. J. McCarthy | 2,719 | 2022 |
| 10 | Tom Brady | 2,636 | 1998 |

Single game
| Rank | Player | Yards | Year | Opponent |
|---|---|---|---|---|
| 1 | Devin Gardner | 503 | 2013 | Indiana |
| 2 | Devin Gardner | 451 | 2013 | Ohio State |
| 3 | Jake Rudock | 440 | 2015 | Indiana |
| 4 | John Navarre | 389 | 2003 | Iowa |
| 5 | Shea Patterson | 384 | 2019 | Michigan State |
| 6 | Cade McNamara | 383 | 2021 | Michigan State |
| 7 | Tom Brady | 375 | 1998 | Ohio State |
| 8 | Chad Henne | 373 | 2007 | Florida |
| 9 | Scott Dreisbach | 372 | 1995 | Virginia |
| 10 | Tom Brady | 369 | 1999 | Alabama |

=== Passing touchdowns ===
Career
| Rank | Player | TDs | Years |
|---|---|---|---|
| 1 | Chad Henne | 87 | 2004 2005 2006 2007 |
| 2 | John Navarre | 72 | 2000 2001 2002 2003 |
| 3 | Elvis Grbac | 71 | 1989 1990 1991 1992 |
| 4 | Denard Robinson | 49 | 2009 2010 2011 2012 |
| | J. J. McCarthy | 49 | 2021 2022 2023 |
| 6 | Rick Leach | 48 | 1975 1976 1977 1978 |
| 7 | Shea Patterson | 45 | 2018 2019 |
| 8 | Devin Gardner | 44 | 2010 2011 2012 2013 2014 |
| 9 | Steve Smith | 42 | 1980 1981 1982 1983 |
| 10 | Todd Collins | 37 | 1991 1992 1993 1994 |

Single season
| Rank | Player | TDs | Year |
|---|---|---|---|
| 1 | Elvis Grbac | 25 | 1991 |
| | Chad Henne | 25 | 2004 |
| 3 | John Navarre | 24 | 2003 |
| 4 | Chad Henne | 23 | 2005 |
| | Shea Patterson | 23 | 2019 |
| 6 | Chad Henne | 22 | 2006 |
| | Shea Patterson | 22 | 2018 |
| | J. J. McCarthy | 22 | 2022 |
| | J. J. McCarthy | 22 | 2023 |
| 10 | Elvis Grbac | 21 | 1990 |
| | John Navarre | 21 | 2002 |
| | Devin Gardner | 21 | 2013 |

Single game
| Rank | Player | TDs | Year | Opponent |
|---|---|---|---|---|
| 1 | Jake Rudock | 6 | 2015 | Indiana |
| 2 | Shea Patterson | 5 | 2019 | Indiana |
| 3 | 24 times | 4 | | |

== Rushing ==
=== Rushing yards ===
Career
| Rank | Player | Yards | Years |
|---|---|---|---|
| 1 | Mike Hart | 5,040 | 2004 2005 2006 2007 |
| 2 | Denard Robinson | 4,495 | 2009 2010 2011 2012 |
| 3 | Anthony Thomas | 4,472 | 1997 1998 1999 2000 |
| 4 | Jamie Morris | 4,392 | 1984 1985 1986 1987 |
| 5 | Tyrone Wheatley | 4,178 | 1991 1992 1993 1994 |
| 6 | Butch Woolfolk | 3,850 | 1978 1979 1980 1981 |
| 7 | Blake Corum | 3,737 | 2020 2021 2022 2023 |
| 8 | Chris Perry | 3,696 | 2000 2001 2002 2003 |
| 9 | Rob Lytle | 3,307 | 1973 1974 1975 1976 |
| 10 | Billy Taylor | 3,072 | 1969 1970 1971 |

Single season
| Rank | Player | Yards | Year |
|---|---|---|---|
| 1 | Tim Biakabutuka | 1,818 | 1995 |
| 2 | Anthony Thomas | 1,733 | 2000 |
| 3 | Jamie Morris | 1,703 | 1987 |
| 4 | Denard Robinson | 1,702 | 2010 |
| 5 | Chris Perry | 1,674 | 2003 |
| 6 | Mike Hart | 1,562 | 2006 |
| 7 | Rob Lytle | 1,469 | 1976 |
| 8 | Blake Corum | 1,463 | 2022 |
| 9 | Butch Woolfolk | 1,459 | 1981 |
| 10 | Mike Hart | 1,455 | 2004 |

Single game
| Rank | Player | Yards | Year | Opponent |
|---|---|---|---|---|
| 1 | Ron Johnson | 347 | 1968 | Wisconsin |
| 2 | Tim Biakabutuka | 313 | 1995 | Ohio State |
| 3 | Jon Vaughn | 288 | 1990 | UCLA |
| 4 | Ron Johnson | 270 | 1967 | Navy |
| 5 | Denard Robinson | 258 | 2010 | Notre Dame |
| 6 | Butch Woolfolk | 253 | 1981 | Michigan State |
| 7 | Blake Corum | 243 | 2022 | Maryland |
| 8 | Tyrone Wheatley | 235 | 1992 | Washington |
| | Denard Robinson | 235 | 2012 | Purdue |
| 10 | Jamie Morris | 234 | 1987 | Alabama |
| | Mike Hart | 234 | 2004 | Illinois |

=== Rushing touchdowns ===
Records for years prior to 1949 are not included in the University of Michigan's statistical records database. Where pre-1949 records are available from reliable sources, they have been included below with yellow shading. Because there is no complete database of pre-1949 records, such records are incomplete and may not be considered "official" records. Unless otherwise indicated, touchdown totals in this section are taken from the 2011 Michigan Football Record Book.

Career
| Rank | Player | TDs | Years |
|---|---|---|---|
| 1 | Willie Heston | 72 | 1901 1902 1903 1904 |
| 2 | Blake Corum | 58 | 2020 2021 2022 2023 |
| 3 | Anthony Thomas | 55 | 1997 1998 1999 2000 |
| 4 | Tyrone Wheatley | 47 | 1991 1992 1993 1994 |
| 5 | Denard Robinson | 42 | 2009 2010 2011 2012 |
| 6 | Mike Hart | 41 | 2004 2005 2006 2007 |
| 7 | Albert Herrnstein | 39 | 1898 1899 1900 1901 1902 |
| | Chris Perry | 39 | 2000 2001 2002 2003 |
| 9 | Joe Curtis | 35 | 1903 1904 1905 1906 |
| 10 | Tom Hammond | 34 | 1903 1904 1905 |
| | Rick Leach | 34 | 1975 1976 1977 1978 |

Single season
| Rank | Player | TDs | Year |
|---|---|---|---|
| 1 | Blake Corum | 27 | 2023 |
| 2 | Albert Herrnstein | 26 | 1902 |
| 3 | Willie Heston | 21 | 1904 |
| 4 | Willie Heston | 20 | 1901 |
| | Hassan Haskins | 20 | 2021 |
| 6 | Neil Snow | 19 | 1901 |
| | Ron Johnson | 19 | 1968 |
| 8 | Anthony Thomas | 18 | 2000 |
| | Chris Perry | 18 | 2003 |
| | Blake Corum | 18 | 2022 |

Single game
| Rank | Player | TDs | Year | Opponent |
|---|---|---|---|---|
| 1 | Albert Herrnstein | 7 | 1902 | Michigan Agr. |
| 2 | Albert Herrnstein | 6 | 1901 | Beloit |
| | Willie Heston | 6 | 1904 | Kalamazoo |
| | Sam Davison | 6 | 1908 | Kentucky |
| 5 | Albert Herrnstein | 5 | 1901 | Buffalo |
| | Neil Snow | 5 | 1901 | Stanford |
| | Albert Herrnstein | 5 | 1902 | Ohio State |
| | Tom Hammond | 5 | 1903 | Albion |
| | Herb Graver | 5 | 1903 | Ohio State |
| | Willie Heston | 5 | 1903 | Beloit |
| | Joe Curtis | 5 | 1904 | West Virginia |
| | Harry Hammond | 5 | 1904 | Kalamazoo |
| | Fred Norcross | 5 | 1904 | West Virginia |
| | Paul Magoffin | 5 | 1907 | Michigan Agr. |
| | Ron Johnson | 5 | 1968 | Wisconsin |
| | Hassan Haskins | 5 | 2021 | Ohio State |
| | Blake Corum | 5 | 2022 | UConn |

== Receiving ==
=== Receptions ===
Career
| Rank | Player | Rec | Years |
|---|---|---|---|
| 1 | Braylon Edwards | 252 | 2001 2002 2003 2004 |
| 2 | Marquise Walker | 176 | 1998 1999 2000 2001 |
| 3 | Jeremy Gallon | 173 | 2010 2011 2012 2013 |
| 4 | Jason Avant | 169 | 2002 2003 2004 2005 |
| 5 | Anthony Carter | 161 | 1979 1980 1981 1982 |
| 6 | Steve Breaston | 156 | 2003 2004 2005 2006 |
| 7 | Roy Roundtree | 154 | 2009 2010 2011 2012 |
| 8 | David Terrell | 152 | 1998 1999 2000 |
| 9 | Amara Darboh | 146 | 2012 2014 2015 2016 |
| 10 | Ronnie Bell | 145 | 2018 2019 2020 2021 2022 |

Single season
| Rank | Player | Rec | Year |
|---|---|---|---|
| 1 | Braylon Edwards | 97 | 2004 |
| 2 | Jeremy Gallon | 89 | 2013 |
| 3 | Marquise Walker | 86 | 2001 |
| 4 | Braylon Edwards | 85 | 2003 |
| 5 | Jason Avant | 82 | 2005 |
| 6 | Jack Clancy | 76 | 1966 |
| 7 | Mario Manningham | 72 | 2007 |
| | Roy Roundtree | 72 | 2010 |
| 9 | David Terrell | 71 | 1999 |
| 10 | Tai Streets | 67 | 1998 |
| | David Terrell | 67 | 2000 |
| | Braylon Edwards | 67 | 2002 |
| | Adrian Arrington | 67 | 2007 |

Single game
| Rank | Player | Rec | Year | Opponent |
|---|---|---|---|---|
| 1 | Marquise Walker | 15 | 2001 | Washington |
| | Marquise Walker | 15 | 2001 | Ohio State |
| 3 | Jeremy Gallon | 14 | 2013 | Indiana |
| 4 | Braylon Edwards | 13 | 2003 | Oregon |
| 5 | Brad Myers | 12 | 1958 | Ohio State |
| | Tai Streets | 12 | 1996 | Northwestern |
| | Braylon Edwards | 12 | 2004 | Notre Dame |
| | Andrew Marsh | 12 | 2025 | Northwestern |
| 9 | Jack Clancy | 11 | 1966 | Illinois |
| | Chris Perry | 11 | 2003 | Minnesota |
| | Braylon Edwards | 11 | 2004 | Michigan State |
| | Braylon Edwards | 11 | 2004 | Ohio State |
| | Ronnie Bell | 11 | 2022 | Indiana |

=== Receiving yards ===
Career
| Rank | Player | Yards | Years |
|---|---|---|---|
| 1 | Braylon Edwards | 3,541 | 2001 2002 2003 2004 |
| 2 | Anthony Carter | 3,076 | 1979 1980 1981 1982 |
| 3 | Jeremy Gallon | 2,704 | 2010 2011 2012 2013 |
| 4 | Amani Toomer | 2,657 | 1992 1993 1994 1995 |
| 5 | David Terrell | 2,317 | 1998 1999 2000 |
| 6 | Mario Manningham | 2,310 | 2005 2006 2007 |
| 7 | Roy Roundtree | 2,304 | 2009 2010 2011 2012 |
| 8 | Tai Streets | 2,284 | 1995 1996 1997 1998 |
| 9 | Ronnie Bell | 2,269 | 2018 2019 2020 2021 2022 |
| | Marquise Walker | 2,269 | 1998 1999 2000 2001 |

Single season
| Rank | Player | Yards | Year |
|---|---|---|---|
| 1 | Jeremy Gallon | 1,373 | 2013 |
| 2 | Braylon Edwards | 1,330 | 2004 |
| 3 | Mario Manningham | 1,174 | 2007 |
| 4 | Marquise Walker | 1,143 | 2001 |
| 5 | Braylon Edwards | 1,138 | 2003 |
| 6 | David Terrell | 1,130 | 2000 |
| 7 | Amani Toomer | 1,096 | 1994 |
| 8 | Jack Clancy | 1,077 | 1966 |
| 9 | David Terrell | 1,038 | 1999 |
| 10 | Tai Streets | 1,035 | 1998 |
| | Braylon Edwards | 1,035 | 2002 |

Single game
| Rank | Player | Yards | Year | Opponent |
|---|---|---|---|---|
| 1 | Jeremy Gallon | 369 | 2013 | Indiana |
| 2 | Roy Roundtree | 246 | 2010 | Illinois |
| 3 | Jehu Chesson | 207 | 2015 | Indiana |
| 4 | Jack Clancy | 197 | 1966 | Oregon State |
| 5 | Tai Streets | 192 | 1998 | Minnesota |
| 6 | Braylon Edwards | 189 | 2004 | Michigan State |
| | Andrew Marsh | 189 | 2025 | Northwestern |
| 8 | Derrick Alexander | 188 | 1993 | Illinois |
| 9 | Jim Smith | 184 | 1975 | Purdue |
| | Jeremy Gallon | 184 | 2013 | Notre Dame |

=== Receiving touchdowns ===
Career
| Rank | Player | TDs | Years |
|---|---|---|---|
| 1 | Braylon Edwards | 39 | 2001 2002 2003 2004 |
| 2 | Anthony Carter | 37 | 1979 1980 1981 1982 |
| 3 | Desmond Howard | 32 | 1989 1990 1991 |
| 4 | Mario Manningham | 27 | 2005 2006 2007 |
| 5 | David Terrell | 23 | 1998 1999 2000 |
| 6 | Derrick Alexander | 22 | 1989 1990 1991 1992 1993 |
| 7 | Roman Wilson | 20 | 2020 2021 2022 2023 |
| 8 | Tai Streets | 19 | 1995 1996 1997 1998 |
| 9 | Amani Toomer | 18 | 1992 1993 1994 1995 |
| 10 | Marquise Walker | 17 | 1998 1999 2000 2001 |
| | Jeremy Gallon | 17 | 2010 2011 2012 2013 |

Single season
| Rank | Player | TDs | Year |
|---|---|---|---|
| 1 | Desmond Howard | 19 | 1991 |
| 2 | Braylon Edwards | 15 | 2004 |
| 3 | Anthony Carter | 14 | 1980 |
| | David Terrell | 14 | 2000 |
| | Braylon Edwards | 14 | 2003 |
| 6 | Mario Manningham | 12 | 2007 |
| | Roman Wilson | 12 | 2023 |
| 7 | Desmond Howard | 11 | 1990 |
| | Derrick Alexander | 11 | 1992 |
| | Tai Streets | 11 | 1998 |
| | Marquise Walker | 11 | 2001 |

Single game
| Rank | Player | TDs | Year | Opponent |
|---|---|---|---|---|
| 1 | Derrick Alexander | 4 | 1992 | Minnesota |
| | Jehu Chesson | 4 | 2015 | Indiana |
| 3 | Ron Kramer | 3 | 1955 | Missouri |
| | Greg McMurtry | 3 | 1989 | Minnesota |
| | Desmond Howard | 3 | 1991 | Boston College |
| | Desmond Howard | 3 | 1991 | Indiana |
| | Derrick Alexander | 3 | 1992 | Northwestern |
| | David Terrell | 3 | 1999 | Alabama |
| | David Terrell | 3 | 2000 | Northwestern |
| | Braylon Edwards | 3 | 2004 | Michigan State |
| | Braylon Edwards | 3 | 2004 | Texas |
| | Mario Manningham | 3 | 2006 | Notre Dame |
| | Jeremy Gallon | 3 | 2013 | Notre Dame |
| | Devin Funchess | 3 | 2014 | Appalachian State |
| | Donovan Peoples-Jones | 3 | 2018 | SMU |
| | Nico Collins | 3 | 2019 | Indiana |
| | Roman Wilson | 3 | 2023 | East Carolina |

== Total offense ==
Total offense is the sum of passing and rushing statistics. It does not include receiving or returns.

Michigan does not include total offense records in its current statistical database.

=== Total offense yards ===
Career
| Rank | Player | Yards | Years |
|---|---|---|---|
| 1 | Denard Robinson | 10,745 | 2009 2010 2011 2012 |
| 2 | Chad Henne | 9,400 | 2004 2005 2006 2007 |
| 3 | John Navarre | 9,031 | 2000 2001 2002 2003 |
| 4 | Devin Gardner | 7,252 | 2010 2011 2012 2013 2014 |
| 5 | J. J. McCarthy | 6,858 | 2021 2022 2023 |
| 6 | Steve Smith | 6,554 | 1980 1981 1982 1983 |
| 7 | Rick Leach | 6,460 | 1975 1976 1977 1978 |
| 8 | Elvis Grbac | 6,221 | 1989 1990 1991 1992 |
| 9 | Shea Patterson | 5,984 | 2018 2019 |
| 10 | Jim Harbaugh | 5,745 | 1983 1984 1985 1986 |

Single season
| Rank | Player | Yards | Year |
|---|---|---|---|
| 1 | Denard Robinson | 4,272 | 2010 |
| 2 | Devin Gardner | 3,443 | 2013 |
| 3 | Denard Robinson | 3,349 | 2011 |
| 4 | John Navarre | 3,276 | 2003 |
| 5 | J. J. McCarthy | 3,193 | 2023 |
| 6 | Jake Rudock | 3,183 | 2015 |
| 7 | Shea Patterson | 3,111 | 2019 |
| 8 | J. J. McCarthy | 3,025 | 2022 |
| 9 | John Navarre | 2,889 | 2002 |
| 10 | Shea Patterson | 2,873 | 2018 |

Single game
| Rank | Player | Yards | Year | Opponent |
|---|---|---|---|---|
| 1 | Devin Gardner | 584 | 2013 | Indiana |
| 2 | Jake Rudock | 504 | 2015 | Indiana |
| 3 | Denard Robinson | 502 | 2010 | Notre Dame |
| 4 | Denard Robinson | 494 | 2010 | Indiana |
| 5 | Devin Gardner | 461 | 2013 | Ohio State |
| 6 | Denard Robinson | 454 | 2011 | Northwestern |
| 7 | Denard Robinson | 446 | 2011 | Notre Dame |
| 8 | Denard Robinson | 426 | 2012 | Air Force |
| 9 | Cade McNamara | 406 | 2021 | Michigan State |
| 10 | Denard Robinson | 397 | 2012 | UMass |

=== Touchdowns responsible for ===
"Touchdowns responsible for" is the official NCAA designation for combined passing and rushing touchdowns.

Career
| Rank | Player | TDs | Years |
|---|---|---|---|
| 1 | Denard Robinson | 91 | 2009 2010 2011 2012 |
| 2 | Chad Henne | 90 | 2004 2005 2006 2007 |
| 3 | Rick Leach | 82 | 1975 1976 1977 1978 |
| 4 | John Navarre | 74 | 2000 2001 2002 2003 |
| 5 | Steve Smith | 73 | 1980 1981 1982 1983 |
| 6 | Willie Heston | 72 | 1901 1902 1903 1904 |
| | Elvis Grbac | 72 | 1989 1990 1991 1992 |
| | Devin Gardner | 72 | 2010 2011 2012 2013 2014 |
| 9 | Blake Corum | 61 | 2020 2021 2022 2023 |
| 10 | J. J. McCarthy | 59 | 2021 2022 2023 |

Single season
| Rank | Player | TDs | Year |
|---|---|---|---|
| 1 | Denard Robinson | 36 | 2011 |
| 2 | Denard Robinson | 32 | 2010 |
| 3 | Devin Gardner | 32 | 2013 |
| 4 | Rick Leach | 29 | 1978 |
| 5 | Shea Patterson | 28 | 2019 |
| | Blake Corum | 28 | 2023 |
| 7 | Steve Smith | 27 | 1981 |
| | Chad Henne | 27 | 2004 |
| | J. J. McCarthy | 27 | 2022 |

== Defense ==
=== Interceptions ===
Career
| Rank | Player | Ints | Years |
|---|---|---|---|
| 1 | Tom Curtis | 25 | 1967 1968 1969 |
| 2 | Charles Woodson | 18 | 1995 1996 1997 |
| 3 | Wally Teninga | 13 | 1945 1947 1948 1949 |
| 4 | Gene Derricotte | 12 | 1944 1946 1947 1948 |
| | Brad Cochran | 12 | 1982 1983 1984 1985 |
| | Leon Hall | 12 | 2003 2004 2005 2006 |
| 7 | Rick Volk | 11 | 1964 1965 1966 |
| | Thom Darden | 11 | 1969 1970 1971 |
| | Vada Murray | 11 | 1988 1989 1990 |
| | DeWayne Patmon | 11 | 1997 1998 1999 2000 |

Single season
| Rank | Player | Ints | Year |
|---|---|---|---|
| 1 | Tom Curtis | 10 | 1968 |
| 2 | Chuck Lentz | 9 | 1949 |
| 3 | Tom Curtis | 8 | 1969 |
| | Charles Woodson | 8 | 1997 |
| 5 | Tom Curtis | 7 | 1967 |
| | Barry Pierson | 7 | 1969 |

=== Tackles ===
Career
| Rank | Player | Tackles | Years |
|---|---|---|---|
| 1 | Ron Simpkins | 516 | 1976 1977 1978 1979 |
| 2 | Jarrett Irons | 440 | 1993 1994 1995 1996 |
| 3 | Erick Anderson | 428 | 1988 1989 1990 1991 |
| 4 | Paul Girgash | 414 | 1979 1980 1981 1982 |
| 5 | Mike Mallory | 396 | 1982 1983 1984 1985 |
| 6 | Andy Cannavino | 385 | 1977 1978 1979 1980 |
| 7 | Calvin O'Neal | 378 | 1974 1975 1976 |
| 8 | Sam Sword | 377 | 1995 1996 1997 1998 |
| 9 | Mike Boren | 369 | 1980 1981 1982 1983 |
| 10 | Steve Morrison | 360 | 1990 1991 1992 1993 |

Single season
| Rank | Player | Tackles | Year |
|---|---|---|---|
| 1 | Ron Simpkins | 174 | 1977 |
| 2 | Mike Boren | 171 | 1982 |
| 3 | Ron Simpkins | 168 | 1978 |
| | Andy Cannavino | 168 | 1980 |
| 5 | Paul Girgash | 157 | 1982 |
| 6 | Calvin O'Neal | 153 | 1976 |
| 7 | Mike Boren | 152 | 1981 |
| 8 | Calvin O'Neal | 151 | 1975 |
| | Andy Cannavino | 151 | 1979 |
| 10 | Ron Simpkins | 150 | 1979 |

Single game
| Rank | Player | Tackles | Years | Opponent |
|---|---|---|---|---|
| 1 | Calvin O'Neal | 24 | 1976 | Purdue |
| 2 | Tom Stincic | 23 | 1968 | Ohio State |
| | Steven Morrison | 23 | 1992 | Illinois |
| 4 | Dennis Morgan | 21 | 1966 | North Carolina |
| 5 | Frank Nunley | 20 | 1966 | Northwestern |
| | Ron Simpkins | 20 | 1977 | Ohio State |

=== Sacks ===
Career
| Rank | Player | Sacks | Years |
|---|---|---|---|
| 1 | Mark Messner | 36.0 | 1985 1986 1987 1988 |
| 2 | Brandon Graham | 29.5 | 2006 2007 2008 2009 |
| 3 | James Hall | 25.0 | 1996 1997 1998 1999 |
| 4 | Chris Hutchinson | 24.0 | 1989 1990 1991 1992 |
| | Jason Horn | 24.0 | 1992 1993 1994 1995 |
| | Glen Steele | 24.0 | 1995 1996 1997 |
| | LaMarr Woodley | 24.0 | 2003 2004 2005 2006 |
| 8 | Derrick Moore | 21.0 | 2022 2023 2024 2025 |
| 9 | Tim Jamison | 20.0 | 2005 2006 2007 2008 |
| 10 | Robert Thompson | 19.0 | 1979 1980 1981 1982 |
| | Taco Charlton | 19.0 | 2013 2014 2015 2016 |

Single season
| Rank | Player | Sacks | Year |
|---|---|---|---|
| 1 | Aidan Hutchinson | 14.0 | 2021 |
| 2 | David Bowens | 12.0 | 1996 |
| | LaMarr Woodley | 12.0 | 2006 |
| 4 | Mark Messner | 11.0 | 1985 |
| | Chris Hutchinson | 11.0 | 1992 |
| | Jason Horn | 11.0 | 1995 |
| | James Hall | 11.0 | 1998 |
| | David Ojabo | 11.0 | 2021 |
| 9 | Brandon Graham | 10.5 | 2009 |
| 10 | Mark Messner | 10.0 | 1987 |
| | Brandon Graham | 10.0 | 2008 |
| | Taco Charlton | 10.0 | 2016 |
| | Derrick Moore | 10.0 | 2025 |

Single game
| Rank | Player | Sacks | Years | Opponent |
|---|---|---|---|---|
| 1 | Mark Messner | 5.0 | 1987 | Northwestern |
| 2 | Brandon Graham | 3.5 | 2007 | Notre Dame |

== Kicking ==
=== Field goals made ===
Career
| Rank | Player | FGs | Years |
|---|---|---|---|
| 1 | Jake Moody | 69 | 2018 2019 2020 2021 2022 |
| 2 | Garrett Rivas | 64 | 2003 2004 2005 2006 |
| 3 | Remy Hamilton | 63 | 1993 1994 1995 1996 |
| 4 | Mike Gillette | 57 | 1985 1986 1987 1988 |
| 5 | Brendan Gibbons | 45 | 2010 2011 2012 2013 |
| 6 | Quinn Nordin | 42 | 2017 2018 2019 2020 |
| 7 | J. D. Carlson | 39 | 1989 1990 1991 |
| 8 | Dominic Zvada | 38 | 2024 2025 |
| 9 | Kenny Allen | 37 | 2012 2013 2014 2015 2016 |
| 10 | Ali Haji-Sheikh | 31 | 1979 1980 1981 1982 |

Single season
| Rank | Player | FGs | Year |
|---|---|---|---|
| 1 | Jake Moody | 29 | 2022 |
| 2 | Remy Hamilton | 25 | 1994 |
| 3 | Jake Moody | 23 | 2021 |
| 4 | Dominic Zvada | 21 | 2024 |
| 5 | Remy Hamilton | 19 | 1995 |
| | Garrett Rivas | 19 | 2004 |
| | Garrett Rivas | 19 | 2005 |
| | Kenny Allen | 19 | 2016 |
| | Quinn Nordin | 19 | 2017 |
| 10 | Remy Hamilton | 18 | 1996 |
| | Mike Gillette | 18 | 1988 |
| | Kenny Allen | 18 | 2015 |
| | James Turner | 18 | 2023 |

Single game
| Rank | Player | FGs | Years | Opponent |
|---|---|---|---|---|
| 1 | Jake Moody | 6 | 2018 | Indiana |
| 2 | Mike Gillette | 5 | 1988 | Minnesota |
| | J. D. Carlson | 5 | 1990 | Illinois |
| | K. C. Lopata | 5 | 2008 | Minnesota |
| | Quinn Nordin | 5 | 2017 | Air Force |
| | Jake Moody | 5 | 2022 | Michigan State |

=== Field goal percentage ===
Career (min. 15 attempts)
| Rank | Player | FG% | Years |
|---|---|---|---|
| 1 | James Turner | 85.7% | 2023 |
| 2 | Bob Bergeron | 82.9% | 1981 1982 1983 1984 |
| 3 | Kenny Allen | 82.2% | 2012 2013 2014 2015 2016 |
| 4 | Jake Moody | 82.1% | 2018 2019 2020 2021 2022 |
| 5 | Dominic Zvada | 80.9% | 2024 2025 |
| 6 | Garrett Rivas | 78.0% | 2003 2004 2005 2006 |
| 7 | K. C. Lopata | 77.8% | 2007 2008 |
| 8 | Jay Feely | 76.9% | 1995 1996 1997 1998 |
| 9 | Remy Hamilton | 76.8% | 1993 1994 1995 1996 |
| 10 | Jeff Del Verne | 75.0% | 1999 2000 |
| | Brendan Gibbons | 75.0% | 2010 2011 2012 2013 |

Single season (min. 10 attempts)
| Rank | Player | FG% | Year |
|---|---|---|---|
| 1 | Dominic Zvada | 95.5% | 2024 |
| 2 | J. D. Carlson | 92.9% | 1989 |
| 3 | Jake Moody | 92.0% | 2021 |
| 4 | K. C. Lopata | 91.7% | 2007 |
| | Jake Moody | 91.7% | 2018 |
| 6 | Brendan Gibbons | 88.9% | 2012 |
| 7 | Bob Bergeron | 88.2% | 1983 |
| 8 | James Turner | 85.7% | 2023 |
| 9 | Garrett Rivas | 85.0% | 2006 |
| 10 | Remy Hamilton | 83.3% | 1994 |

== Margin of victory ==
=== Season ===
| Rank | Year | Coach | Points for | Points against | Delta |
|---|---|---|---|---|---|
| 1 | 1902 | Yost | 644 | 12 | 632 |
| 2 | 1903 | Yost | 565 | 6 | 559 |
| 3 | 1901 | Yost | 550 | 0 | 550 |
| 4 | 1904 | Yost | 567 | 22 | 545 |
| 5 | 1905 | Yost | 495 | 2 | 493 |
| 6 | 2023 | Harbaugh | 538 | 156 | 382 |
| 7 (tie) | 1947 | Crisler | 394 | 53 | 341 |
| 7 (tie) | 2016 | Harbaugh | 524 | 183 | 341 |
| 7 (tie) | 2022 | Harbaugh | 566 | 225 | 341 |
| 10 | 1971 | Schembechler | 421 | 83 | 338 |

=== Game (overall) ===
| Rank | Year | Opponent | Margin | Score |
|---|---|---|---|---|
| 1 | 1904 | West Virginia | 130 | 130–0 |
| 2 | 1901 | Buffalo | 128 | 128–0 |
| 3 | 1902 | Michigan State | 119 | 119–0 |
| 4 | 1902 | Iowa | 107 | 107–0 |
| 5 | 1904 | Kalamazoo | 95 | 95–0 |
| 6 | 1901 | Beloit | 89 | 89–0 |
| 7 (tie) | 1902 | Albion | 88 | 88–0 |
| 7 (tie) | 1903 | Ferris | 88 | 88–0 |
| 9 | 1902 | Ohio State | 86 | 86–0 |
| 10 | 1939 | Chicago | 85 | 85–0 |

=== Game (modern era) ===
| Rank | Date | Opponent | Margin | Score |
|---|---|---|---|---|
| 1 | 2016 | Rutgers | 78 | 78–0 |
| 2 (tie) | 1947 | Pittsburgh | 69 | 69–0 |
| 2 (tie) | 1975 | Northwestern | 69 | 69–0 |
| 4 (tie) | 2016 | Hawaii | 60 | 63–3 |
| 4 (tie) | 2025 | Central Michigan | 60 | 63–3 |
| 6 | 2022 | UConn | 59 | 59–0 |
| 7 (tie) | 2000 | Indiana | 58 | 58–0 |
| 7 (tie) | 2011 | Minnesota | 58 | 58–0 |
| 9 (tie) | 1969 | Illinois | 57 | 57–0 |
| 9 (tie) | 2009 | Delaware State | 57 | 63–6 |
