= Marquise Walker =

American football player (born 1978)

No. 82
- Position: Wide receiver / Punt returner

Personal information
- Born: December 11, 1978 (age 47); Syracuse, New York, U.S.
- Listed height: 6 ft 2 in (1.88 m)
- Listed weight: 219 lb (99 kg)

Career information
- High school: Henninger (Syracuse)
- College: Michigan
- NFL draft: 2002: 3rd round, 86th overall pick

Career history
- Tampa Bay Buccaneers (2002); Arizona Cardinals (2003)*; Cincinnati Bengals (2003)*; Tennessee Titans (2003)*; New England Patriots (2004)*
- * Offseason or practice squad member only

Awards and highlights
- Super Bowl champion (XXXVII); First-team All-American (2001); First-team All-Big Ten (2001)

Marquise Walker (born December 11, 1978) is an American former professional football player who was a wide receiver and punt returner who signed to play in the National Football League (NFL). He played college football for the Michigan Wolverines, setting many of the school's receiving records and becoming an All-American in 2001, when he led the Big Ten Conference in receptions. In 2004, Braylon Edwards surpassed most of his school records. In high school, Walker set several important New York State Public High School Athletic Association (NYSPHSAA) football records for receptions and reception yardage. All of these records have since been broken. Walker is remembered for a pair of spectacular one-handed catches during the 2001 NCAA Division I-A football season.

He was selected by the Tampa Bay Buccaneers with the 86th overall pick in the third round of the 2002 NFL draft. He was injured during his first year with Tampa Bay and had several brief stints with several other NFL teams over the next two seasons. He had signed to play in the Arena Football League in 2006 but did not play.

== High school ==
Walker was born in Syracuse, New York, and was a high school football All-American for Henninger High School in Syracuse. He was also a standout basketball player who averaged over twenty points a game as a sophomore and junior, but abandoned the sport for football. In high school, he established numerous NYSPHSAA football records: career receptions (181), single-season receptions (80), and career receiving yards (3352). In addition, he recorded the second highest single-season yardage total (1190). His 13 single-season touchdowns was third in state history, and he totaled thirty-five career touchdowns for Henninger. He played defensive back and accumulated two hundred tackles and fourteen interceptions. Walker was named as the Gatorade High School Football Player of the Year for New York State, and he was named to the 1997 USAToday All-USA high school football team. He was ranked as the ninth best high school football prospect in the country in 1998 by the Sporting News.

Walker's career-high school records were broken in 2004 by Bruce Williams out of Syracuse's Christian Brothers Academy, who played for the Syracuse Orange football team from 2005 through 2008. Williams took four years to break Walker's record which was set during only three years. Walker's single-season receptions record was broken in 2001 by Anthony Morat of Rome, New York's "Free Academy" who later played Division III football at the State University of New York at Cortland from 2003 to 2006 and earned 2006 first-team All-conference honors. Harold Jasper, whose career receiving yards record Walker broke, later played for the Iowa Hawkeyes football team and two Arena football teams. Jasper also was the only receiver to have had more single-season yards in New York State history than Walker.

== College career ==
Walker is best remembered for a pair of one-handed catches he made in 2001. Before the 2002 NFL draft, Baltimore Ravens Senior vice president of football operations, Ozzie Newsome referred to Walker's collegiate catches as some of the best catches he has seen in college in a long time. One of the one-handed catches was a touchdown catch in the back of the end zone against the Iowa Hawkeyes football team in a 32–26 comeback from a 21–7 deficit on October 27, 2001. The Post-Standard, Walker's hometown newspaper, described his grab in the Iowa game this way: "There he was in the corner of the end zone, as two Iowa defensive backs stalked him like sentries. The ball delivered high and wide, seemed an improbable stretch, an impossible goal. And yet, as it spiraled toward him, Marquise Walker leaped and lifted his right arm. His fingertips grazed the leather and tipped it skyward. And then, as he tumbled back to earth, he wrapped his hands around the ball and caressed it to his chest. Touchdown Michigan."

Walker seriously considered playing for Syracuse University of the Big East Conference, but Syracuse Orange quarterback Donovan McNabb only had one more year remaining. McNabb, who was the Big East Conference offensive player of the decade for the 1990s, was not likely to be replaced by a quarterback of equal skill. Thus, Walker went on to wear #4 at Michigan. Walker played football at Michigan from the 1998 NCAA Division I-A football season through the 2001 season, finishing his career with 176 receptions for 2,269 yards and 17 touchdowns. During his career he played on two Big Ten Championship teams (1998, 2000), but neither team went to the Rose Bowl. During his career, the two teams that he compiled the most total single-opponent receiving yards against were Michigan's fiercest conference opponents: He had 256 yards against Ohio State and 251 yards against Michigan State. His highest career single-opponent touchdown and single-opponent reception totals were also in the Michigan – Ohio State football rivalry games and his Paul Bunyan Trophy game totals were tied for second in both of these statistics.

Playing at Washington on September 8, 2001, Walker set the Michigan record for the most receptions in a game with 15, surpassing Tai Streets and Brad Myers. He tied his mark later in season against Ohio State. This record continued to stand through the 2009 NCAA Division I FBS football season. Both of Walker's 15-reception efforts came in losses. He first recorded 15 receptions against the Washington Huskies football team in a 23–18 loss where he accumulated 159 yards and two touchdowns from quarterback John Navarre. On that day he added a 13-yard run and a 15-yard punt return. Then on November 24, 2001, he surpassed Carter as the career receptions leader, he totaled 15 receptions in a 26–20 loss to the Ohio State Buckeyes football team while accumulating 160 yards and two touchdowns. These two games with 160 and 159 yards receiving were Walker's career highs. His other 150 yard game came against the Michigan State football team during the same season on November 3, 2001, with nine receptions. Walker had two touchdowns in each of his three 150-yard reception games.

Walker set several other records at Michigan that have been surpassed. His career reception total surpassed that of Anthony Carter as the most in school history. During his senior year in 2001, Walker set Michigan single-season records with 86 receptions and 1,143 receiving yards, surpassing Jack Clancy (who still holds the record for receptions for ten games) and David Terrell, respectively. Walker also broke Mercury Hayes' school record for most consecutive games with a reception (32 games). These marks were all surpassed by Braylon Edwards in 2004. He also set the single-season 100-yard games record with six. This mark has been surpassed by both Edwards and Mario Manningham.

During his time at Michigan he blocked a total of four punts. One block set up a field goal in Michigan's 2001 20–17 victory against Wisconsin at Camp Randall Stadium. The NCAA Division I-A career record was seven when he completed his eligibility and is now ten, and the Big Ten record was five and is now six based on the NCAA record book. The total continues to be a Michigan record by virtue of the fact that the NCAA record book does not recognize any Michigan player as having recorded more than four. However, some press reports credit Ed Frutig with five punt blocks during the eight-game 1940 season.

Walker's statistics ranked him highly in Big Ten Conference history. Both his single-game reception total of 15 and his single-season reception total of 86 were sixth in Big Ten history at the end of his career although both were ninth all time through the 2006 NCAA season. Walker won both the Big Ten Conference games and Big Ten all games receptions titles in 2001. He ranked sixth in the nation in receptions per game with 7.36 and 17th in reception yards per game with 94.82. During the 2001 season, his 1177 yards from scrimmage (1143 yards receiving and 34 rushing) edged out B. J. Askew's 1138 yards (236 yards receiving and 902 rushing) for the team lead in yards from scrimmage. In addition, he threw a 51-yard pass completion to Jermaine Gonzales, and he compiled 206 yards as a punt returner. As a result, he also led the team in All-purpose yards. In a game against the Purdue Boilermakers on October 13, 2001, he totaled 249 yards of total offense, including 134 yards on seven receptions and 112 yards on seven punt returns. Walker earned team MVP honors for the 2001 season. He was a Biletnikoff Award finalist. Among his 2001 All-American honors were a first-team selection by the American Football Coaches Association, a second-team selection by the Associated Press, and an honorable mention by CNNSI.com.

== Professional career ==
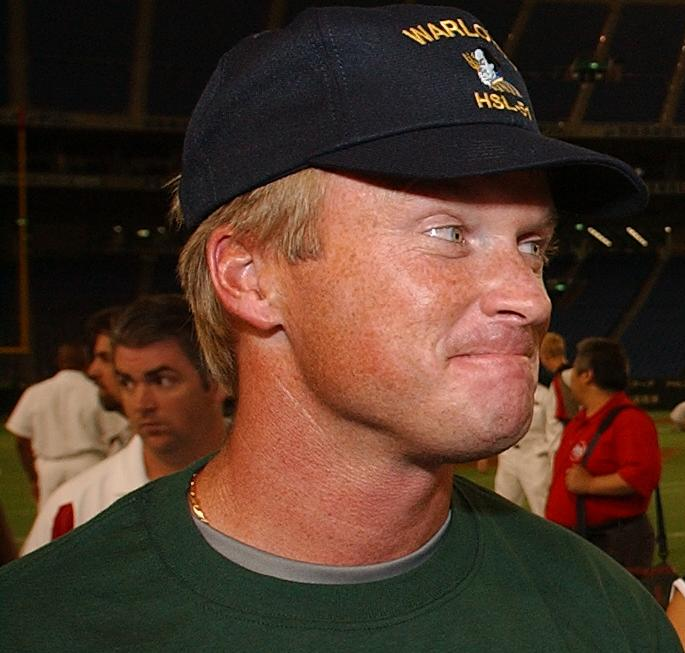
Jon Gruden made Walker his first draft pick as Buccaneer head coach.

Scouts for the professional football teams described Walker as a "Big physical receiver, who uses his size to muscle the ball away from defenders...Lacks explosive speed, but has the exceptional body control and balance." In another scouting report he was described as a "Striding-type runner who is not quick or sudden. Dominates average defensive backs but has a hard time getting separation vs. a good corner" In direct questioning during interviews, Walker confessed that he never had run a 40-yard dash and did not practice straight-line speed. Thus, there was some consensus that he did not have the speed to play wide receiver in the National Football League and that he did not work on his speed. It was also said that he "Lacks soft hands and will do a lot of double-catching and body-catching. Has a lot of drops for a featured No. 1 receiver."

When Jon Gruden took over the head coaching job of the Tampa Bay Buccaneers from Tony Dungy, he made Walker his first draft selection in the 2002 NFL Draft with the 86th overall selection that came in the third round of the draft. Although Walker was the property of the Buccaneers for the 2002 NFL season, he did not appear in any games. Walker had been behind Keyshawn Johnson, Joe Jurevicius and Keenan McCardell on the Buccaneer 2002 depth chart. Then, he injured his ankle in August and was inactive for the first four games of the season. He was injured in September with torn ligaments in his thumb and had season ending surgery, which caused the Buccaneers to place him on injured reserve in October. Thus, he was not on the game roster for the Super Bowl XXXVII Champion Buccaneers. He was traded to the Arizona Cardinals for running back Thomas Jones prior to the 2003 NFL season after the Cardinals lost their top three wide receivers (including David Boston and Frank Sanders) to free agency. He was cut by the Cardinals on August 23, 2003, and picked up by the Cincinnati Bengals on August 25, 2003, who released him on August 27, 2003. The Tennessee Titans briefly placed him on their practice squad while trying to convert him to tight end later during the season, and the Miami Dolphins worked him out at different times during the season.

Walker, who had signed with the Super Bowl Champion New England Patriots in February prior to the 2004 NFL season for the league minimum $305,000, was released by the Patriots on July 21, 2004. Walker signed with the Orlando Predators of the Arena Football League to play wide receiver and linebacker for Predator head coach Jay Gruden during the 2006 Arena Football League season. Gruden was also an offensive assistant coach with the Super Bowl XXXVII champion Buccaneers. Walker was waived by the Predators.

== See also ==
- Lists of Michigan Wolverines football receiving leaders
