= Tai Streets =

American football player (born 1977)

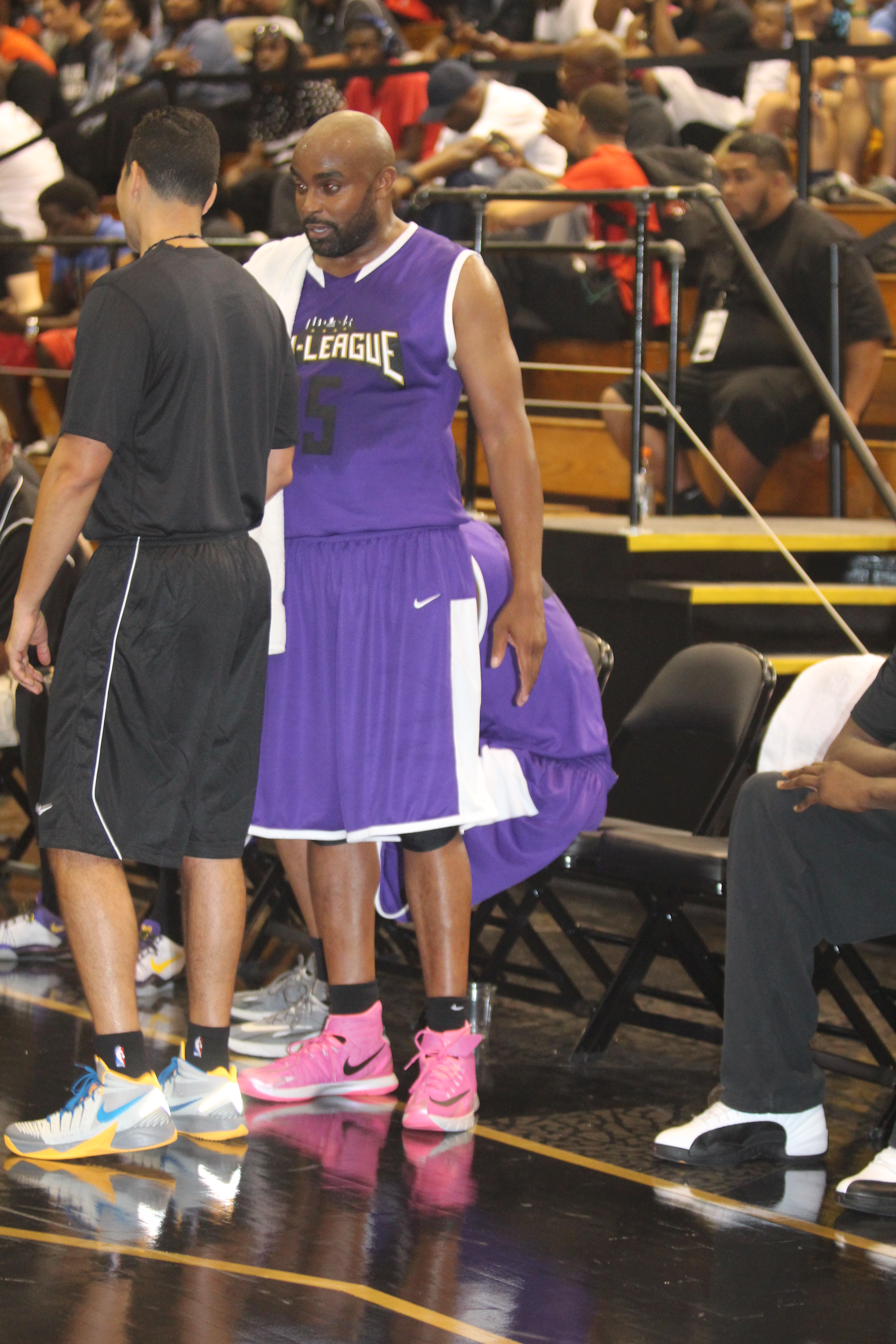
- Streets in the Nike summer basketball Chi-League in 2014

No. 89, 84
- Position: Wide receiver

Personal information
- Born: April 20, 1977 (age 49); Chicago, Illinois, U.S.
- Listed height: 6 ft 3 in (1.91 m)
- Listed weight: 207 lb (94 kg)

Career information
- High school: Harvey (IL) Thornton
- College: Michigan
- NFL draft: 1999: 6th round, 171st overall pick

Career history
- San Francisco 49ers (1999–2003); Detroit Lions (2004)

Awards and highlights
- National champion (1997); Second-team All-Big Ten (1998)

Career NFL statistics
- Receptions: 196
- Receiving yards: 2,268
- Touchdowns: 14
- Stats at Pro Football Reference

Tai Lamar Streets (born April 20, 1977) is an American former professional football player who was a wide receiver in the National Football League (NFL). He was selected with the second pick of the sixth round of the 1999 NFL draft by the San Francisco 49ers. He also played for the Detroit Lions in 2004. He was the leading receiver for the national champion 1997 Michigan Wolverines football team.

In high school, he was an All-American in football and as a senior led his team to a 9–0 regular season before losing in the playoffs. In basketball, he was an All-State selection by numerous publications and led his team past Kevin Garnett's high school team to reach the finals of the state championship playoff tournament. Despite losing in the finals, he was the highest votegetter on the All-tournament team. In track, he was a state long jump champion as a junior and runner-up as a senior when he also helped his school's 4 x 400 metres relay team finish third in the state. In 1995, he was widely regarded as the best high school athlete in the Chicago metropolitan area, winning athlete of the year awards from the Chicago Tribune, Chicago Sun-Times and Illinois High School Association. He is considered to be one of the greatest three-sport athletes in the history of Illinois.

Streets led the Michigan Wolverines football team in receiving yards each season from 1996 to 1998. He had two touchdown receptions in the 1998 Rose Bowl, which clinched a share of the national championship. During his years as the primary receiver, there were quarterback controversies each year with battles among Brian Griese, Scott Dreisbach, Tom Brady and Drew Henson. As a senior, he was voted football team MVP and All-Big Ten Conference second-team wide receiver. That season, he posted five 100-yard games and totaled over one thousand yards. He played in the Senior Bowl and was selected for the Hula Bowl. He was injured right before the 1999 draft causing him to slip from a projected second-round selection to a sixth-round choice. As a sophomore, he played part of the season for the 1996–97 Michigan Wolverines men's basketball team, which won the 1997 National Invitation Tournament, but has since vacated the championship due to the University of Michigan basketball scandal.

Streets had modest success as a professional in five seasons with the 49ers. He began as a fourth wide receiver on a team with perennial Pro Bowl receivers Jerry Rice and Terrell Owens, but he eventually became a starter before moving on to play his final season with the Lions. His career was highlighted by playoff performances in which he caught at least four receptions for at least 50 yards in all three playoff games. He recorded two fourth quarter playoff touchdowns one of which was the game-winner in a 24-point comeback victory and the other of which was a game-tying touchdown in a losing effort.

== Early life ==
Streets was born in Matteson, Illinois. His mother, Karen Streets, named him after Olympic figure skater Tai Babilonia. Streets' father is Clayton Streets. His mother kept him active in sports as a youth to keep him out of trouble. His mother describes him as a clumsy awkward youth and his father remembers him for his duck-footed stance. However, his father says the first time he saw Tai play youth football, he outran everyone on the other team when running an end reverse. Streets has younger sisters named Aja and Jad.

== High school ==
After Streets' parents separated, he lived with his mother in Matteson. She started him in track, which quickly supplanted baseball, which he last played at age 12. At Rich South High School of Richton Park, Illinois he participated initially in basketball and track with basketball in his sights for professional success. As a sophomore, Streets briefly played halfback for the football team, but he broke his ankle in a freak accident after the second game, and vowed never to return. Rich South coach Hud Venerable, who had seen videotapes of Streets, set out to bring him back as a junior. He attempted to recruit Streets by attending his basketball games and track meets. He knew Streets wanted to play wide receiver. He realized football could provide a better college opportunity than basketball, especially for a 6-foot-4-inch (1.93 m) athlete such as himself. After he returned to football, he became widely known in all three sports.

As a sophomore in 1992–93, Streets scored 20 points and posted 12 rebounds in his first varsity basketball game for Rich South on January 22, 1993. The team finished that season with a 14–10 record. That same season, Streets won the Amateur Athletic Union (AAU) triple jump championship. As a junior, he helped the team compile a 26–2 record as it entered the sectional finals. In track, he won the Class AA state championship in the long jump on his final jump of 23 feet 7 inches (7.19 m) and was leading in the triple jump with a jump of 49 feet 8.25 inches (15.14 m) until Byron Topps leapt to a state record of 50 feet 7 inches (15.42 m). During his junior year, he was recognized, along with fellow future professional football player Donovan McNabb, as one of the 16 best boy athletes in the Chicago metropolitan area by the Chicago Sun-Times for his efforts in high school football, basketball and track. That spring he was also selected as one of the ten best football prospects in the Chicago area by high school athlete expert Tom Lemming for his play at wide receiver. College coaches who recruit in the Chicago area selected him as one of the top 16 1994 football prospects. One recruiting service rated him as one of the top five football prospects in Illinois and one of the top three wide receiver prospects in the United States. During the summer between his junior and senior year Streets was selected as to the All-Tournament team for the AAU 17 & under men's basketball National Invitational Tournament held in Kenner, Louisiana.

Streets moved in with his dad and transferred to Thornton Township High School. At the time of his 1994 senior year transfer to Harvey, Illinois's Thornton, Streets was described by a Chicago Sun-Times journalist as "the best high school athlete in Illinois". The Sun-Times chose him as one of the six best football prospects in the area and as an All-Area Offensive selection before his senior season. He was a preseason All-American in football. Lemming named him as one of the top 100 senior prospects in the nation. By this time, Lemming considered him to be the best high school wide receiver in Illinois. According to Sporting News, Streets and Randy Moss were among the four best wide receivers in the nation. National Recruiting Advisor listed him fifth behind Peter Warrick, Moss, Mondriel Fulcher, and Corey Jones.

Streets and sophomore quarterback Antwaan Randle El helped Thornton snap Homewood-Flossmoor High School's 44-game conference winning streak in the SICA East in football. Over the course of the season he helped Thornton achieve a 9–0 record on its way to the Class 6A state playoffs. Although Streets accumulated nine receptions for 145 yards in the playoff game, he only had one touchdown in the waning moments and was kept from making gamebreaking plays when it mattered. He ended the season as a Chicago Tribune second-team All-state selection. In high school, he aspired to have a broadcasting career after athletics like his role model Ahmad Rashad and also had visions of Olympic Games competition. As late as December of his senior year, he was considering Michigan, Illinois, Notre Dame, Wisconsin and South Carolina. In January 1995, he selected the University of Michigan because of its tradition of producing National Football League wide receivers such as Anthony Carter, Derrick Alexander, Desmond Howard and Chris Calloway. Streets was part of a Michigan football recruiting class that included Tom Brady and Charles Woodson. Streets was selected to play in the Chicago Public League Football Coaches Association eighth annual Harold Washington All-Star Football Game. In the 12th annual Suburban All-Star Football Classic, Streets caught a 37-yard fly pattern for the game-winning touchdown.

During his senior basketball season, he was named by the Chicago Tribune as a Prep Athlete of the Week for leading Thornton to victory over Champaign, Illinois' Centennial High School, the 12th ranked school in the state. After the regular season, he was a member of the Chicago Sun-Times All-Area team as well as their Class AA All-State team headlined by Player of the Year Kevin Garnett. He was also selected to the Champaign-Urbana News-Gazette All-state team. Eventually, Streets was named to all five notable All-State teams. In the state playoffs, Streets helped lead Thornton to victory over Garnett's number-one-ranked Farragut Academy team, which also included Ronnie Fields and Michael Wright, in the Class AA state quarterfinals. In the championship game, Streets had a game-high 15 rebounds in a losing effort against Manual High School as Thornton finished with a 30–2 record. Streets was the highest vote-getter on the Associated Press Class AA all-tournament team. He was selected to play in the Illinois Basketball Coaches Association all-star game. Streets scored 12 points and had 10 rebounds in the game. Streets was also selected as a member of the Chicago Suburban All-Stars. He placed fourth in the 1995 Illinois Mr. Basketball selection that Garnett won in a landslide. USA Today recognized him as an honorable mention All-USA selection. He was part of a Michigan Wolverines men's basketball incoming number-one ranked recruiting class with three McDonald's All-Americans: Robert Traylor, Albert White, and Louis Bullock.

During his 1995 senior track season, he ran a sub-21 second 200 meter in the SICA East Conference championship meet. In the sectional state championship meet qualifier, Streets posted a long jump of 24 feet 9 inches (7.54 m) and a triple jump of 45 feet 9.5 inches (13.96 m). The Illinois High School Association (IHSA) championship meet record of 24 feet 6.25 inches (7.47 m) set in 1969 seemed in jeopardy. On the first day of the long jump competition, Streets posted a 23 feet 6 inches (7.16 m), which was second to the leader's 24 feet 2.5 inches (7.38 m), and neither athlete improved his jump on the second day, leaving Streets as the second-place finisher. Streets also ran a 47 split for his leg of the third-place 4 x 400 metres relay team at the state meet.

He graduated in the class of 1995. His high school basketball teams included future professional athletes Randle El, Melvin Ely, and Napoleon Harris. As a senior, Streets won the Chicago Sun-Times all sport 1994–95 high school athlete of the year award. He also was named Chicago Tribune March 1995 Athlete of the Month and 1994–95 Chicago Tribune Athlete of the Year, which was awarded June 21, 1995 at Comiskey Park. Streets was also honored as the IHSA Sports Report Athlete of the Year. Daily Herald of Arlington Heights, Illinois said that Streets would have won their Athlete of the Year award had he competed in their coverage area. Streets was so highly regarded as an athlete that the Thornton baseball coach repeatedly extended him an open offer to pitch for the baseball team.

== College career ==
Streets played college football and basketball at the University of Michigan. As a true freshman in the 1995 NCAA Division I-A football season, Streets only caught five passes for the 1995 Michigan Wolverines football team: he caught three in the 52–17 October 28 Little Brown Jug rivalry game victory against the Minnesota Golden Gophers and two in the 31–23 November 25 Michigan – Ohio State rivalry game with the Ohio State Buckeyes. All five athletes who had more receptions than him that season went on to play professional football (Mercury Hayes − 48, Amani Toomer – 44, Jay Riemersma – 41, Chris Howard – 14 and Jerame Tuman – 9). Hayes, Toomer and Riemersma, who accounted for 75 percent of the team's yardage, were all selected in the 1996 NFL draft, leaving Streets as the leading returning wide receiver (Howard was a running back and Tuman was a tight end).

In 1996, Michigan dealt with a starting quarterback returning from a season-ending injury and a depleted receiving group: Scott Dreisbach had missed the final two-thirds of the season, leaving Brian Griese as the starter and freshman Tom Brady served as an understudy. Streets earned the starting wide receiver job and started in all twelve games. He led the 1996 Michigan Wolverines football team in receptions and reception yardage with 44 receptions for 730 yards. In the first game of the season against Illinois, Streets made the key block on Dreisbach's 72-yard touchdown run. Two weeks later he made key catches on both the game-tying and game-winning scoring drives against the Colorado Buffaloes. His best statistical performance came at home in Cook County, Illinois in front of a large gathering of friends and family against Northwestern when he recorded 12 receptions for 150 yards in an October 5, 17–16 loss. This first appearance in the Chicago area would be his collegiate career-best in terms of single-game receptions. The 12 receptions was a school record, but it was overshadowed by a fumble that changed the momentum of the game. Streets caught two touchdown passes both in rivalry games: the opening score from Dreisbach in the 44–10 victory against Minnesota and the only touchdown in a 13–9 victory over Ohio State from Griese. In his sophomore year, after the football season ended with the January 1, 1997 Outback Bowl game, he joined the Michigan Wolverines basketball team in the last week of January and made his debut in a February 1, 1997 game against Michigan State. The team went on to win the 1997 National Invitation Tournament on March 27 that season, and Streets played a few minutes in four of the five games. However, due to the University of Michigan basketball scandal the championship has been vacated. After the basketball season ended, Streets rejoined the football team for Spring practice, and he led all receivers with four receptions for 125 yards in the annual spring game on April 12.

According to his mother, during the summer prior to his 1997 junior year, Streets dedicated himself to weight training like he never had before in an effort to end a Rose Bowl draught that made the 1997 Wolverines the first since the 1969 team to have no Rose Bowl veterans. Although Streets and Russell Shaw were the starting receivers, it was understood that Charles Woodson, who was regarded as one of the most versatile athletes in college football, was expected to play on offense that season. However, it was not clear whether Dreisbach, Brady or Griese would quarterback the team. Griese was named starter shortly before the season opener. It was believed that a solid season by any of the quarterbacks could lead to a productive season by Streets and the receivers. Streets' first touchdown of the season was a 41-yard game-tying catch from Griese in a 21–14 September 27 victory in the rivalry game against Notre Dame. During the season, Streets dislocated both thumbs, with the second injury occurring in the November 1 Little Brown Jug game against Minnesota. Streets caught no passes against either Minnesota or Penn State the following week. His production drought was notable and he recovered on November 15 with five catches for 108 yards including a 38-yard touchdown from Griese on November 15 against Wisconsin. Although the injury-hampered Streets went without a catch in three of the last four regular season games he caught touchdown passes of 53 and 58 yards and drew a key pass interference penalty in the 1998 Rose Bowl. The Rose Bowl performance was Streets' season-high with 127 receiving yards and two touchdowns. It helped solidify Michigan's case as the Bowl Alliance national champion.

In 1998, Streets' returned for his senior season with several experienced receivers including 1997 All-American tight end Tuman. The 1998 Michigan Wolverines football team entered the season with a quarterback battle between Brady, Driesbach and Drew Henson and wide receiver battle between David Terrell and Marquise Walker. In the season September 5 opening game loss against Notre Dame, Streets caught 8 passes for 101 yards in the first half and Marcus Knight accounted for 126 of Michigan's 322 passing yards from Brady and Henson. Streets had back-to-back 100 yard games in October: He posted 117 yards on eight receptions in the October 24 homecoming game against Indiana, and he had a career-high 192 yards against Minnesota on October 31. Against Ohio State, he caught Michigan's only touchdown in a 31–16 November 21 loss as part of a 9 catch and 118 yard effort. In the game-tying touchdown drive in the fourth quarter of the 1999 Florida Citrus Bowl victory over Arkansas, Streets caught a 15-yard completion on third-and-11 and the 8-yarder on fourth-and-2 on his way to a career-ending 7-catch 129-yard effort. Streets caught a fourth-quarter touchdown pass and two-point conversion in the January 23, 1999 Senior Bowl, and he was on the January 24, 1999 Hula Bowl roster.

As a senior, Streets totalled 1035 yards and 11 touchdowns on 76 receptions, and he was named team Most Valuable Player for the 1998 season. Streets was voted to the All-Big Ten Second Team in 1998. Streets remains second to Jack Clancy on the all-time Michigan single game receptions yardage list with 192. Streets led the Michigan receivers statistically for three consecutive years from 1996 – 1998 (Yards 1996–1998, Receptions 1996 & 1998, Receiving touchdowns 1997–1998). Streets finished his career at Michigan with 2284 yards and 19 touchdowns on 144 receptions.

At the March NFL Combine, Streets ran the third fastest 40-yard dash in a time of 4.42 seconds. Streets was regarded as between the 6th and 8th best wide receiver in the 1999 NFL draft according to most expert analyses in April. However, he ruptured his right achilles tendon in a pickup basketball game prior to the draft and was expected to be sidelined for six to eight months. As a result, he was the twentieth wide receiver selected. Streets, who was on crutches at the time of the draft, was relieved to have been drafted.

== Professional career ==
=== San Francisco 49ers ===
The San Francisco 49ers, who had Jerry Rice, Terrell Owens, and J. J. Stokes, did not need a wide receiver right away and gambled on the projected 2nd-round selection with their sixth round pick. Head coach Steve Mariucci said that the team had evaluated his prospect as an injured athlete and had determined him to be a good selection for later rounds despite his injury. Streets was the only 1999 draftee not to sign in July when the other draftees signed, but he signed just before the end of the month. Just before the season started, Streets was placed on the reserve non-football injury list in order to make roster space for Na'il Benjamin and Damon Griffin. Streets was activated onto the 53-man roster prior to week 13 of the season to replace the injured R. W. McQuarters. He activated for the gameday roster three weeks later for the final two games. In his second game, he caught his first two NFL receptions on the Monday Night Football season finale.

When Streets had the chance to exhibit his skills during the 2000 NFL season for the 2000 49ers, he proved himself to be the only speed receiver with the ability to create big plays downfield, but he remained the fourth receiver. During the season as the number four receiver, Streets caught a total of 19 receptions, and he caught four in both games Owens was inactive. In mid-December, Streets broke his tibia and ended his season two weeks prior to the end of the season. The game was Rice's last home game as a 49er and the day that Owens set the then-NFL record for single-game receptions, with 20.

In the 2001 NFL season, Rice signed with the Oakland Raiders. Streets became the number three receiver for the 2001 49ers behind Stokes and Owens that season. In the season opener against the Atlanta Falcons, Streets totaled 81 yards receiving as part of a 335-yard day by Garcia. This was Streets' single-game season-high yardage total for the season. It included a 52-yard overtime catch on 3rd-and-5 in the game-winning drive, the longest reception of Streets' career and more yards than he would accumulate in any single game the rest of the season. Streets recorded his first career touchdown on December 2, 2001, against the Buffalo Bills. Over the course of the season, Streets started three games, and his total receptions and yards, compared to the prior season, increased from 19 to 28 and 287 to 345, respectively. The 2001–02 NFL playoffs were Streets' NFL playoff debut. In the team's only game against Green Bay, Streets tied for the team-high with four receptions and 50 yards, just two yards short of Stokes' 52-yard effort. Streets caught a fourth-quarter touchdown and game-tying two-point conversion in the game, but the 49ers yielded ten fourth quarter points to lose 25–15.

In the 2002 NFL season, Stokes often performed the role of a tight end, and got injured clearing the way for Streets to start in some games for the 2002 49ers. Streets started a total of 14 games that season. He had eight receptions three times, but recorded no 100-yard games. The final eight-reception game against the Arizona Cardinals on December 21 would prove to be Streets' career-high 90-yard game. The following week on the final Monday Night game of the regular season, Streets posted his first and only two-touchdown effort in a losing cause against the St. Louis Rams. That season, Streets posted his career-highs in yards (756) and receptions (72) and totaled five touchdowns for the first time. The 49ers' season continued into the 2002–03 NFL playoffs and Streets caught five receptions in both of the teams' playoff games, including a game-winning touchdown with one minute remaining in the January 5, 2003, 39–38 victory over the New York Giants. The Giants game was memorable for its 24-point comeback by the 49ers. Despite the natural glory of the game-winning catch, Streets remained a modest footnote in the press and humble with his friends. After the season, Streets was a restricted free agent. He was expected to be signed and traded to another team before the 2003 NFL draft in order to improve the 49ers' draft position.

The team replaced Mariucci with Dennis Erickson in February 2003. Before the 2003 NFL season, Stokes, who at the end of 2002 had been struggling to hold on to the third receiver position, was signed by the Jacksonville Jaguars. Streets started every game for the 2003 49ers. His best performance in terms of receptions and yards was a December 14, 6-reception 89-yard day that included a 41-yard touchdown against the Cincinnati Bengals, which was his longest reception of the season. That season, he totaled 47 receptions and 595 yards as well as a career-high seven touchdowns. Over the course of the season he was slowed by knee tendinitis and after the season he wanted to return to the Midwest. Streets along with Owens, starting quarterback Garcia and starting running back Garrison Hearst, and starting offensive linemen Derrick Deese and Ron Stone were all let go by the team that year. That is regarded as the biggest release of offensive starters in NFL history by a team in a single season.

=== Detroit Lions ===
In March, Streets signed with the Detroit Lions, for the 2004 NFL season. In the 2004 NFL draft, the Lions drafted wide receiver Roy Williams with the seventh overall selection one year after drafting Rogers in the first round. Williams and Rogers were projected as the starters with Streets considered the third receiver as the season began. Rogers broke his collarbone on the third play of the season and was lost for the entire year. Streets started 12 of the 13 games that he played for the 2004 Lions while accumulating 260 yards on 28 receptions. In the seventh game against the Dallas Cowboys on October 31, Roy Williams leveled Streets, who did not catch another pass in the game after the second quarter hit. Streets did not return to practice until November 17. He was in the lineup on November 21, and caught a pass against the Minnesota Vikings. Streets was listed with an injured knee after the December 26 game against the Chicago Bears. Streets did not appear in the Lions' final game of the season on January 2. After the season, he was an unrestricted free agent, due to his years of seniority. The 49ers received a compensatory draft pick in the 2005 NFL draft for losing Streets to free agency. Instead of re-signing Streets, the Lions signed wide receiver Kevin Johnson in April 2005.

== Personal life ==
Streets was active in mentoring and coaching youth basketball while he was a professional football player. He coached a team to the 16-under national AAU championship. Streets was actively involved in creating and expanding the Chicago-area AAU basketball program. He founded and coaches the Meanstreets AAU travelling club team, that has included players like Anthony Davis. Streets was also active in coaching local all-star games, such as the spring game sponsored by The Star/Daily Southtown, Balmoral Park Race Track, McDonald's, Comcast and radio station 99.9 FM.

== See also ==
- Lists of Michigan Wolverines football receiving leaders
