= Chris Perry (American football) =

American football player (born 1981)

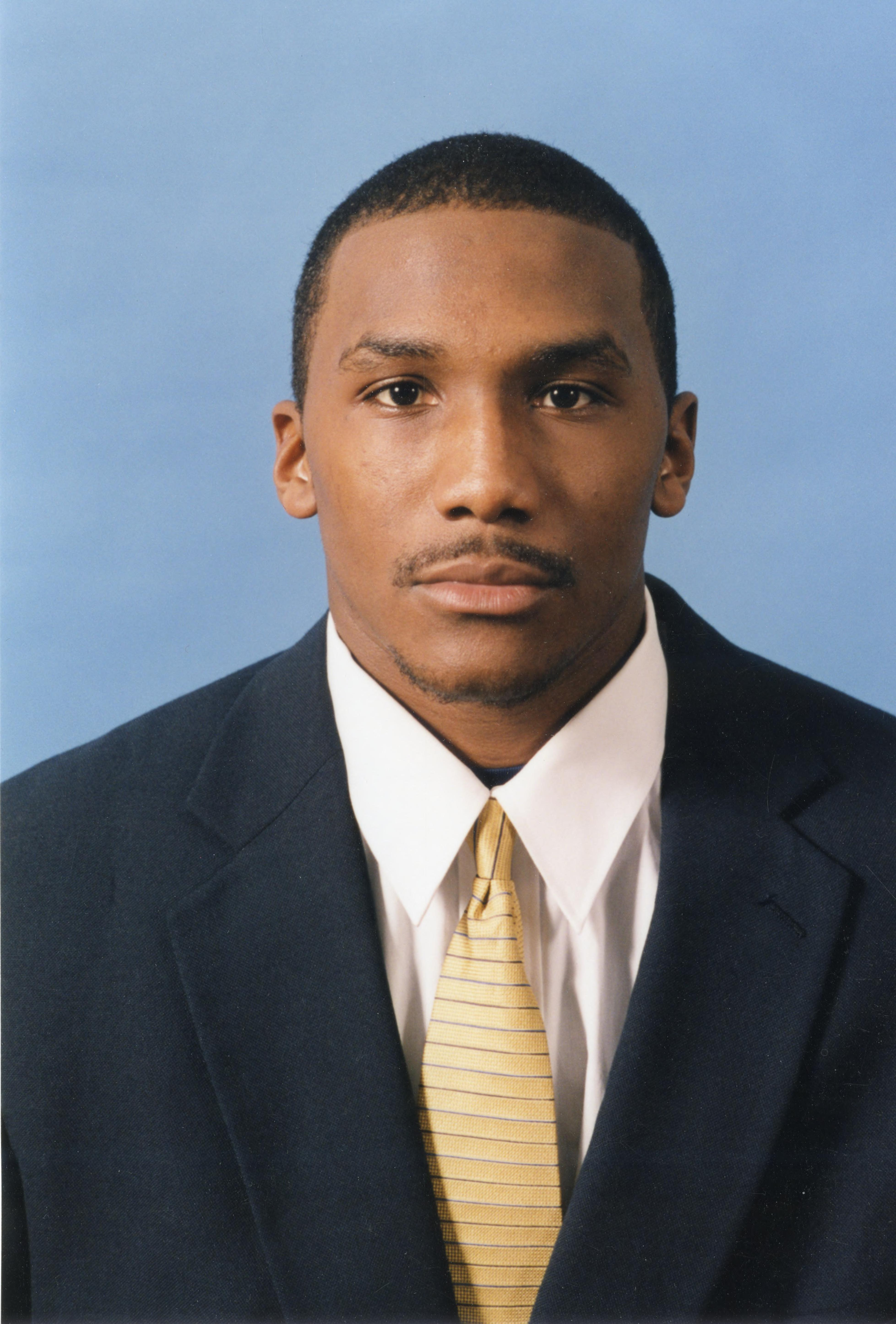
- Perry in 2002

No. 26, 23
- Position: Running back

Personal information
- Born: December 27, 1981 (age 44); Advance, North Carolina, U.S.
- Listed height: 6 ft 0 in (1.83 m)
- Listed weight: 224 lb (102 kg)

Career information
- High school: Fork Union Military (Fork Union, Virginia)
- College: Michigan (2000–2003)
- NFL draft: 2004: 1st round, 26th overall pick

Career history
- Cincinnati Bengals (2004–2008)

Awards and highlights
- Doak Walker Award (2003); Jim Brown Trophy (2003); Consensus All-American (2003); Big Ten Most Valuable Player (2003); Big Ten Offensive Player of the Year (2003); First-team All-Big Ten (2003)

Career NFL statistics
- Rushing attempts: 177
- Rushing yards: 606
- Rushing touchdowns: 2
- Receptions: 83
- Receiving yards: 474
- Receiving touchdowns: 2
- Stats at Pro Football Reference

Raymond Christopher Perry (born December 27, 1981) is an American former professional football player who was a running back for five seasons in the National Football League (NFL). He played college football for the Michigan Wolverines, receiving consensus All-American honors in 2003. He was selected by the Cincinnati Bengals in the first round of the 2004 NFL draft, and played his entire NFL career for the Bengals.

== Early life ==
Perry was born in Advance, North Carolina. He attended Fork Union Military Academy in Fork Union, Virginia, where he helped his team win multiple VISFA State Championships.

== College career ==
Perry attended the University of Michigan, where he played for coach Lloyd Carr's Michigan Wolverines football team from 2000 to 2003. As a senior in 2003, he rushed for 1,674 yards and 18 touchdowns and finished fourth in Heisman Trophy voting and fourth in Michigan annals for rushing yards in a season. Perry was recognized as a consensus All-American, and also received the Doak Walker Award, given to the nation's top running back, was the Big Ten Conference rushing champion, and was named the Big Ten Conference MVP.

Perry set a Michigan game record with 51 carries in a 27–20 win over Michigan State on November 1, 2003. He finished his career at Michigan fifth on the school's career rushing list with 3,696 yards and third in rushing touchdowns with 39.

=== Statistics ===
Season	Rush; Att	Rush; Yards	Yds/Att	Rush; TD	Long	Recv yards	Recv; TD	Total offense	Points scored
2000	77	417	5.4	5	42	0	0	417	30
2001	129	495	3.8	2	30	49	0	544	12
2002	267	1110	4.2	14	57	156	0	1267	84
2003	338	1674	5.0	18	63	367	2	2041	120
Career total	811	3696	4.6	39	63	572	2	4269	246

== Professional career ==
Pre-draft measurables
Height	Weight	Arm length	Hand span	40-yard dash	20-yard shuttle	Three-cone drill	Vertical jump	Broad jump	Bench press
6 ft 0 in (1.83 m)	224 lb (102 kg)	31 3/8 in (0.80 m)	10 1/4 in (0.26 m)	4.56 s	4.08 s	7.02 s	34.5 in (0.88 m)	10 ft 4 in (3.15 m)	19 reps
All values from NFL Combine/Pro Day

Perry was selected by the Cincinnati Bengals in the first round (26th overall) in the 2004 NFL draft. He made his NFL debut at the Pittsburgh Steelers on October 3, but he played only two games in his rookie season with the Bengals due to injuries, starting neither of them. He ran the ball twice, gaining 1 yard, with a long of 1 yard and no touchdowns, for an average of 0.5 yds/carry. However, he caught three receptions for 33 yards, with a long of 13 yards and no touchdowns, for an average of 11 yds/reception. He never fumbled.

Perry played in the 2005 season, complementing Pro Bowl running back Rudi Johnson. He played in 14 games, only starting two, finishing the 2005 season with 279 rushing yards along with 51 receptions for 328 yards and two touchdowns. His 51 receptions were the most by a Bengals running back in one season since James Brooks caught 54 passes in 1986.

Perry fractured his leg in the 11th game of the 2006 season, ending his season. On August 27, 2008, the Bengals cut running back Rudi Johnson from the team, solidifying Perry as the starter for the 2008 season. Perry was released after the season on April 27, 2009.

== See also ==
- Michigan Wolverines football statistical leaders
