= Jeremy Gallon =

American football player (born 1990)

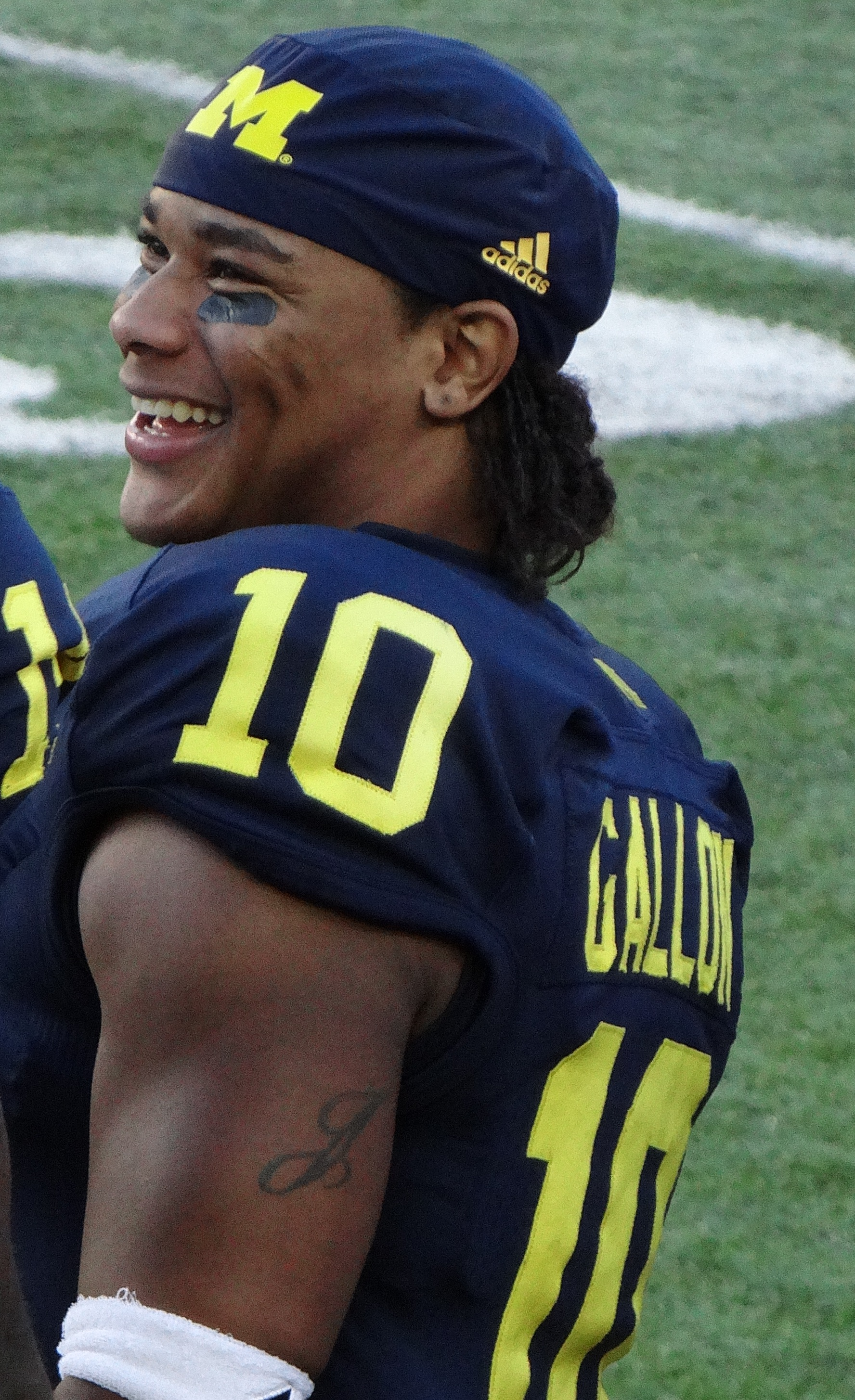
- Gallon at Michigan Stadium, September 2012

No. 83
- Position: Wide receiver

Personal information
- Born: February 9, 1990 (age 36); Apopka, Florida, U.S.
- Listed height: 5 ft 8 in (1.73 m)
- Listed weight: 185 lb (84 kg)

Career information
- High school: Apopka
- College: Michigan
- NFL draft: 2014: 7th round, 244th overall pick

Career history
- New England Patriots (2014)*; Brooklyn Bolts (2014)*; Oakland Raiders (2014–2015)*; Toronto Argonauts (2015–2016)*; Orlando Predators (2016)*; Jacksonville Sharks (2016)*; Nojima Sagamihara Rise (2016); Washington Valor (2017)*; Richmond Roughriders (2018); Atlanta Legends (2019)*
- * Offseason or practice squad member only

Awards and highlights
- Second-team All-Big Ten (2013); All X-League Team (2016)
- Stats at Pro Football Reference

Jeremy Jermaine Gallon (born February 9, 1990) is an American former football player. He played college football for the Michigan Wolverines, finishing second all-time in school history in receptions and receiving yards. He also has the school record for the most receiving yards in a season, 1,373, and the Big Ten Conference record for the most receiving yards in a single game, 369. Gallon was selected by the New England Patriots in the seventh round of the 2014 NFL draft. He played professionally in seven other football leagues after his NFL stint.

== Early life ==
Gallon played high school football as a quarterback, running back and safety for Apopka High School in Apopka, Florida. In three years of varsity football, he gained 5,905 yards of total offense (4,281 rushing yards and 1,624 passing yards), scored 53 rushing touchdowns and threw for 15 touchdowns.

Gallon had been a running back as a sophomore, but he was moved to quarterback in his junior year. Although he had never played at the position previously, Gallon became the 2007 All-Central Florida quarterback. He totaled 1,613 rushing yards (and 23 rushing touchdowns) and 1,071 passing yards (and eight passing touchdowns) in his first season at the position. He also completed 63.6% of his passes and threw zero interceptions during the 2007 season. His high school coach Rick Darlington said, "He's the next Pat White. Jeremy never throws a pick, he completes passes, he makes big plays, and he may be the smartest player we have. He's kind of freaky."

During his senior year, Gallon totaled 2,383 yards of total offense (1,830 rushing yards and 553 passing yards). He rushed for 304 yards on 21 carries and scored three touchdowns in Florida's high school Kickoff Classic in 2008.

Gallon was rated by Rivals.com as a four-star prospect and the No. 11 wide receiver in the country. He was also selected to play in the U.S. Army All-American Bowl and was named the Orlando Sentinel's Offensive Player of the Year as a junior.

College recruiting
Name	Hometown	School	Height	Weight	40^{‡}	Commit date
Jeremy Gallon; WR	Apopka, Florida	Apopka (FL)	5 ft 9 in (1.75 m)	170 lb (77 kg)	Jun 5, 2008	
Jeremy Gallon; WR	Recruit ratings: Scout: Rivals: (85)					
Overall recruit ranking: Scout: 45 (WR) Rivals: 151, 11 (ATH), 31 (FL) ESPN: 40 (ATH), 118 (FL)
Note: In many cases, Scout, Rivals, 247Sports, On3, and ESPN may conflict in their listings of height and weight.; In these cases, the average was taken. ESPN grades are on a 100-point scale.; Sources: "Michigan Football Commitments". Rivals.; "2009 Michigan Football Commits". Scout.; "ESPN". ESPN.; "Scout.com Team Recruiting Rankings". Scout.; "2009 Team Ranking". Rivals.com.

== College career ==
Gallon was Michigan's leading receiver for three consecutive seasons in 2011, 2012 and 2013. On October 19, 2013, Gallon had 369 receiving yards against Indiana to set a Big Ten Conference single-game record. His receiving yards against Indiana ranks second all-time in NCAA Division FBS history behind Troy Edwards (405 yards for Louisiana Tech). During the 2013 season, he also set the Michigan Wolverines football single-season record with 1,373 receiving yards.

=== Commitment and 2010 season ===
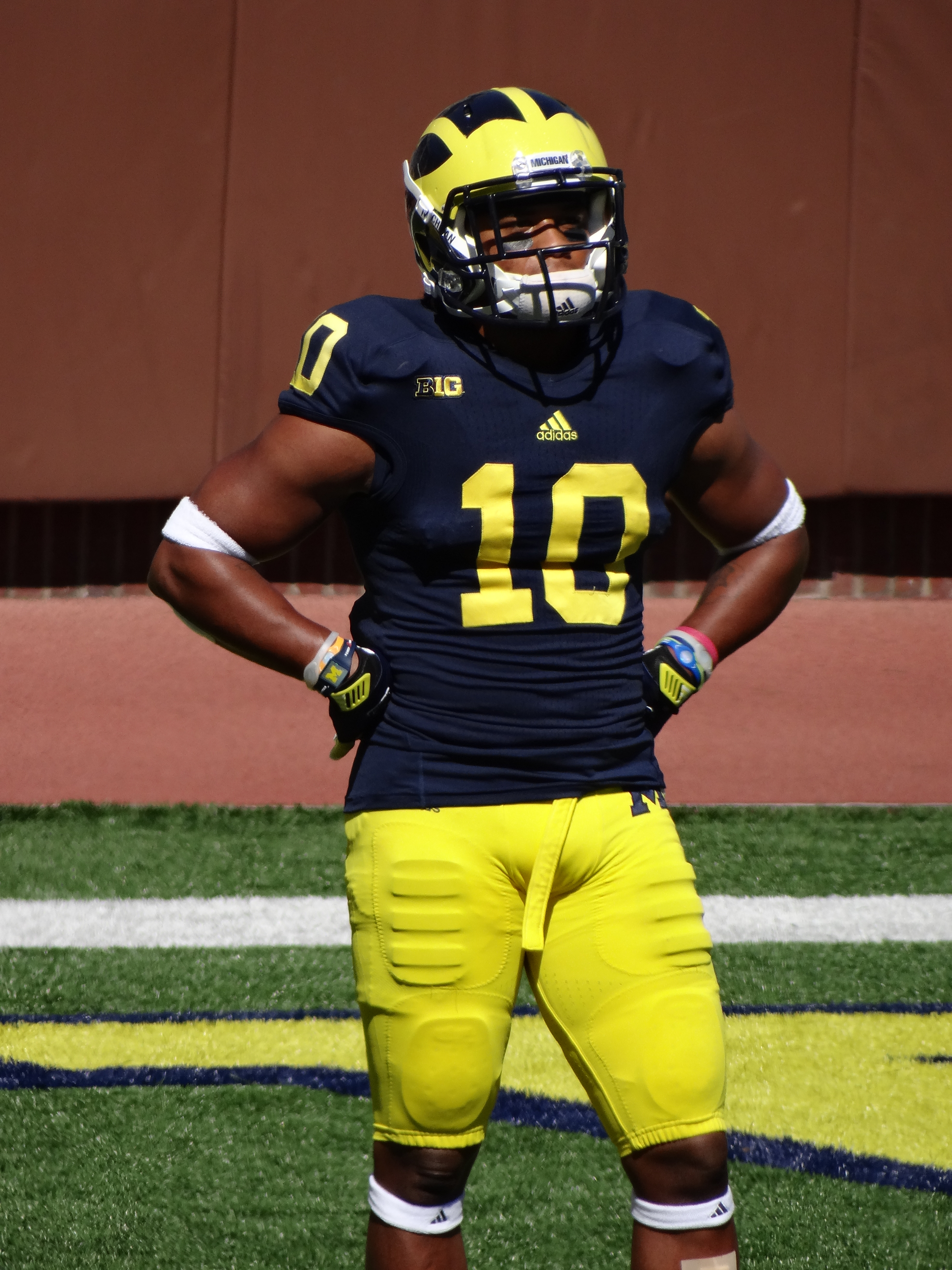
Gallon in Sept. 2012

In June 2008, Gallon announced his commitment to the University of Michigan. He enrolled at Michigan in the fall of 2009, but he did not see action as a redshirt during the 2009 football season. In 2010, Gallon made his debut for the Wolverines as a redshirt freshman. He led the 2010 Michigan Wolverines with 27 kickoff returns for 589 yards, an average of 21.8 yards per return. He also led the team with 10 punt returns for 43 yards, an average of 4.3 yards per return. He also caught two passes for 25 yards and a touchdown against Bowling Green in September 2010.

=== 2011 season ===
As a redshirt sophomore in 2011, Gallon was the Wolverines' leading receiver with eight receptions through the first four games of the season. Playing against Notre Dame on September 10, 2011, he caught two passes for 78 yards, including a 64-yard catch late in the fourth quarter to set up Michigan's game-winning touchdown. After the Notre Dame game, Ned Hayes of the Chicago Sun-Times wrote, "What I'm still trying to figure out is how Jeremy Gallon got so wide open on the 64-yard catch and run that set up the game-winning touchdown." Describing Gallon's last-minute catch against Notre Dame, Tim Rohan wrote in The Michigan Daily:

One-hundred fourteen thousand, eight hundred and four pairs of eyes slowly turned toward Jeremy Gallon. They widened when they realized no Notre Dame jerseys were in the picture they'll remember forever. 'Oh my god. Where did he come from?' said one man standing in the South endzone. ... Gallon blended in with his teammates on the sideline, until a blue blur came streaking out of nowhere.

The following week, Gallon had three receptions for 43 yards and an 80-yard punt return that was negated by a penalty. Gallon was awarded a game ball by Jim Knight of AnnArbor.com for his performance against Eastern Michigan.

In a victory over Northwestern on October 8, 2011, Gallon had five receptions for 73 yards, including at touchdown on a 25-yard screen pass. On October 29, 2011, he caught three passes for 79 yards against Purdue.

During the 2011 regular season, Gallon was Michigan's second leading receiver with 30 catches for 450 yards and three touchdowns. He was the team's leading punt returner with 19 returns for 192 yards (an average of 10.1 yards per return).

=== 2012 season ===
During the 2012 season, Gallon was the team's leading receiver with 49 catches for 829 yards and four touchdowns and an average of 16.9 yards per reception. In the season opener against Alabama, Gallon had four receptions for 107 yards, including a career-long 71-yard reception in the first half. He added a 71-yard touchdown reception against Illinois in October 2012. In the final home game of the season, a 42–17 victory over Iowa, Gallon caught five passes for 133 yards.

Gallon also handled punt returns for the 2012 Michigan team. He was a 2012 All-Big Ten honorable mention selection by both the coaches and the media for the 2012 Wolverines.

=== 2013 season ===
Through the first seven games of the 2013 season, Gallon was Michigan's leading receiver with 45 catches for 831 yards and seven touchdowns.

In Michigan's 41–30 victory over Notre Dame on September 7, 2013, Gallon caught eight passes for 184 yards and three touchdowns. He also had 14 yards rushing against the Irish. Gallon's 184 receiving yards against Notre Dame is tied for the seventh highest single-game performance in school history.

On October 19, 2013, Gallon caught 14 passes for 369 yards and two touchdowns. Gallon's 369 receiving yards in the game set a Big Ten Conference record. He ranks second all-time in NCAA Division I FBS history behind Troy Edwards, who had 405 yards for Louisiana Tech in 1998 game. During the 2013 Buffalo Wild Wings Bowl, Gallon eclipsed Braylon Edwards' school single-season receiving yardage record of 1,330 yards by increasing his total to 1373.

== Professional career ==
Pre-draft measurables
Height	Weight	Arm length	Hand span	40-yard dash	10-yard split	20-yard split	20-yard shuttle	Three-cone drill	Vertical jump	Broad jump	Bench press
5 ft 7 1/2 in (1.71 m)	185 lb (84 kg)	29 1/2 in (0.75 m)	9 3/8 in (0.24 m)	4.49 s	1.60 s	2.66 s	4.26 s	7.07 s	39.5 in (1.00 m)	10 ft 10 in (3.30 m)	15 reps
All values from NFL Combine/Pro Day

Gallon was selected 244th overall by the New England Patriots in the seventh round of the 2014 NFL draft. He spent much of training camp "on the active/physically unable to perform list with an undisclosed ailment" before finally passing a physical on August 18. On August 31, he was later released by the New England Patriots.

The Brooklyn Bolts signed Gallon in October 2014 after having tryouts with the Miami Dolphins, Indianapolis Colts and Green Bay Packers. The Brooklyn Bolts are in the Fall Experimental Football League (FXFL). Gallon signed a future contract with the Oakland Raiders on December 30.

Gallon was waived by the Raiders on May 11, 2015.

On December 18, 2015, Gallon was signed by the Toronto Argonauts of the Canadian Football League.

On June 14, 2016, Gallon was assigned to the Orlando Predators of the Arena Football League (AFL). On July 5, 2016, Gallon was placed on reassignment.

On July 6, 2016, Gallon was claimed by the Jacksonville Sharks off reassignment, but he refused to report after being assigned to the team on July 12. Later that month, he signed with the Nojima Sagamihara Rise of the X-League, along with former Wolverine teammate Devin Gardner.

On October 14, 2016, Gallon was selected by the Washington Valor during the dispersal draft.

In February 2018, Gallon signed with the Richmond Roughriders.

In September 2018, Gallon signed with Alliance Atlanta of the Alliance of American Football, but failed to make the final roster.

== See also ==
- Michigan Wolverines football statistical leaders
