= Jack Clancy =

American football player (born 1944)

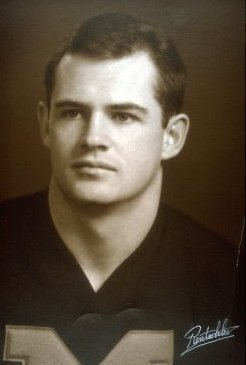

No. 24, 80
- Position: Wide receiver

Personal information
- Born: June 18, 1944 (age 82); Humboldt, Iowa, U.S.
- Listed height: 6 ft 2 in (1.88 m)
- Listed weight: 195 lb (88 kg)

Career information
- High school: St. Mary of Redford (Detroit, Michigan)
- College: Michigan (1962–1966)
- NFL draft: 1966: 5th round, 73rd overall pick
- AFL draft: 1966: Red Shirt 3rd round, 19th overall pick

Career history
- Miami Dolphins (1967–1969); Green Bay Packers (1970)

Awards and highlights
- AFL All-Star (1967); AFL rookie reception record; Unanimous All-American (1966); First-team All-Big Ten (1966); Second-team All-Big Ten (1965); Michigan Wolverines MVP

Career NFL/AFL statistics
- Receptions: 104
- Receiving yards: 1,401
- Receiving touchdowns: 5
- Stats at Pro Football Reference

Jack David Clancy (born June 18, 1944) is an American former professional football player who was a wide receiver for the Miami Dolphins in 1967 and 1969 and for the Green Bay Packers in 1970. He played college football with the Michigan Wolverines from 1963 to 1966.

At the University of Michigan, Clancy started as a quarterback, switched to halfback, returned punts and kickoffs, and became a star as an end. In two seasons as an end (1965–1966), Clancy rewrote the Michigan receiving record book. At the time of his graduation, he held the school records for most receptions and receiving yards in a career, season and game. His 1966 total of 197 receiving yards against Oregon State remained Michigan's single-game receiving record until November 6, 2010. He was named an All-American and also set the Big Ten Conference record for most receptions in a single season of conference play. Though most of his records have since been broken, Clancy continues to rank among the leading receivers in Michigan history.

Clancy was drafted by the Miami Dolphins of the American Football League (AFL). In 1967, quarterback Bob Griese and Clancy were both rookies for the Dolphins. Clancy caught 67 passes that year, setting an AFL rookie record. He was third in the AFL in receptions in 1967 and eighth in receiving yards. He was named to the 1967 AFL All-star game. After a sensational rookie season, Clancy suffered a serious knee injury in a 1968 exhibition game and missed the entire season. While making a comeback in 1969, Clancy suffered an injury to his other knee. Traded to the Green Bay Packers in 1970, Clancy was unable to return to his prior form after the knee injuries. He made only 16 receptions in 14 games and was released by the Packers before the start of the 1971 season.

== College ==
A native of Humboldt, Iowa, Clancy's family moved to the Green Bay, Wisconsin, area, where Clancy attended elementary school. His family next moved to Garden City, Michigan, where Clancy attended Garden City schools, then the family moved to Detroit, where he graduated in 1962 from St. Mary of Redford High School. Clancy then enrolled at the University of Michigan. As a freshman in 1962, Clancy was on the roster as a quarterback but did not play.

=== 1963 season ===
In 1963, Clancy appeared in nine games as a halfback and also returned punts and kickoffs. He generated 520 yards of total offense: 228 yards on kickoff returns, 109 yards rushing, 105 yards on punt returns, and 78 yard receiving. Against Minnesota in 1963, he fumbled a punt at Michigan's 35-yard line; the ball rolled toward the Michigan goal line and was recovered by Michigan at its own 16-yard line. Michigan punted from deep in its own territory on second down, and Minnesota cashed in on the field position with the game's only touchdown in a 6–0 Minnesota victory.

=== 1964 season ===
Clancy was named the starting halfback before the start of the 1964 season. However, he suffered a back injury in September 1964 and spent more than two weeks in the University Hospital before being released on September 17, 1964. As a result of the injury, Clancy missed Michigan's Big Ten championship season in 1964, as Jim Detwiler took over his halfback spot. Clancy was given an extra year of eligibility for missing the 1964 season. Quarterback Dick Vidmer also missed the 1964 season with a broken leg; Vidmer and Clancy would return from their injuries as a powerful passing and receiving combination in 1966.

=== 1965 season ===
In 1965, Clancy switched to end and became the first Michigan Wolverine with 50 receptions in a season, and set Michigan single-season records with 52 receptions and 762 yards. In his first game at the end position, Clancy made what was described as "a circus catch" in the endzone on a pass from quarterback Dick Vidmer. Clancy set the Big Ten receiving record in against Wisconsin, catching a 52-yard touchdown pass from quarterback Wally Gabler on Michigan's first offensive play. At the time, the Associated Press reported: "What makes Clancy's record so much more impressive is the fact that he came to Michigan as a quarterback, switched to halfback and won a spot there two years ago and then turned to end this season. And with Michigan's reputation for always having talented ends—Benny Oosterbaan, Lowell Perry, Ron Kramer and John Henderson among them—Clancy's feat takes on even more brilliance." At the end of the season, Clancy's teammates chose him as captain for the 1966 season. He was also named a second-team All-Big Ten player by the United Press International (UPI).

=== 1966 season ===
Before the 1966 season, Clancy spent the summer in Ann Arbor, Michigan, practicing with Michigan's quarterback Dick Vidmer, cornerback Mike Bass and safety Rick Volk. Clancy and Vidmer worked as a unit through the summer, trying to outmaneuver Bass and Volk. Clancy noted, "If I could catch three or four passes against those guys I'd be doing good." The summer sessions paid off, as both Clancy and Volk were named All-Americans in 1966. Michigan opened the season with a 41–0 win over Oregon State. In that game, Vidmer threw 10 passes to Clancy for 197 yards. Vidmer's first completion to Clancy went for 49 yards and set up Michigan's first touchdown. After the game, the UPI wrote that Clancy and Vidmer were "almost too good for each other." Clancy also led the attack in a 49–0 win over Minnesota on October 22, 1966, catching 10 passes for 168 yards and two touchdowns, including a 56-yard touchdown pass. In 1966, Clancy had three games in which he caught at least 10 catches and broke his own school records with 76 receptions for 1,079 yards. His 50 receptions and 698 yards in conference play were also new Big Ten Conference records. He was named an All-American in 1966 and also received the team's Most Valuable Player award.

=== Records ===
After the 1966 season, Clancy held most major school receiving records at Michigan, as well as many Big Ten Conference records. His accomplishments included:

- Single season receptions in Big Ten Conference play. Clancy was the first player with 50 receptions in Big Ten Conference play (in only seven conference games). His record was broken in 1980 when Keith Chappelle (Iowa) and Dave Young (Purdue) each recorded 51 receptions in eight conference games. The record was not broken on a per game rate until 1983 when Ricky Edwards (Northwestern) recorded 68 receptions in nine games.
- Career receptions and receiving yards. Clancy set Michigan career records with 132 receptions and 1,919 receiving yards. Anthony Carter broke Clancy's career receiving yards record in 1981 and his receptions record in 1982. Clancy now ranks eleventh in receptions and thirteenth in yardage.
- Single game receiving yards. Clancy's 197 yards receiving was unsurpassed as the Michigan single-game record until Roy Roundtree posted 246 on November 6, 2010. He is also the only receiver with two of the top seven and three of the top sixteen yardage games. In addition to the 197-yard effort, Clancy had 10 receptions for 166 yards against Minnesota and 11 receptions for 179 yards against the Illinois.
- Single season receptions. Clancy also set the single-season receptions record with 76 catches in 1966 (playing a 10-game schedule). Marquise Walker broke Clancy's record with 86 receptions in 2001 (playing a 13-game schedule). Clancy now ranks fifth in single-season receptions, but only Braylon Edwards has matched him on a comparable games basis with 76 receptions in his first 10 games of 2004.
- Single season yardage. Clancy also held the single-season yardage record of 1077 until 1994 when Amani Toomer recorded 1096 in 12 games. He currently ranks seventh on the single-season receptions list. No receiver has surpassed his single-season yardage total in the first 10 games of the season. Braylon Edwards (76 receptions for 1049 yards in 2004) and Mario Manningham (62 receptions for 1062 yards in 2007) are the only other Michigan receivers to reach 1000 yards in their 10th game of a season.

==== Michigan single-season reception yardage ====
	Player	Rec.	Yards	Average	Touchdowns	Long	Year	Games	Rec. After 10th Game	Yards After 10th Game
1	Braylon Edwards	97	1330	13.7	15	69	2004	12	76	1049
2	Mario Manningham	72	1174	16.4	12	97	2007	12	62	1062
3	Marquise Walker	86	1143	13.3	11	47	2001	12	66	883
4	Braylon Edwards	85	1138	13.4	14	64	2003	13	59	789
5	David Terrell	67	1130	16.9	14	57	2000	12	58	895
6	Amani Toomer	54	1096	20.3	6	65	1994	12	46	938
7	Jack Clancy	76	1077	14.2	4		1966	10	76	1077

==== Michigan single-game reception yardage ====
	Player	Rec.	Yards	Average	Touchdowns	Long	Year	Opponent
1	Jack Clancy	10	197	19.7	0		1966	Oregon State
2	Tai Streets	6	192	32	1	76	1998	Minnesota
3	Braylon Edwards	11	189	17.2	3	46	2004	Michigan State
4	Derrick Alexander	7	188	26.9	2	90	1993	Illinois
5	Jim Smith	5	184	36.8	1	83	1975	Purdue
6	Jack Clancy	11	179	16.3	1		1966	Illinois
15	Jack Clancy	10	166	16.6	2		1966	Minnesota

Note: the database used here includes statistics since 1949.

== Professional career ==
=== Miami Dolphins ===
Clancy was drafted in the third round of the 1966 AFL draft by the Miami Dolphins and the ninth pick of the fifth round of the 1966 NFL draft (73rd overall) by the St. Louis Cardinals. However, he opted to redshirt for an extra season at Michigan where he played the 1966 NCAA Division I-A football season. He joined the Dolphins for the 1967 AFL season. In 1967, the Dolphins' rookie quarterback Bob Griese combined with rookie receiver Clancy for 67 receptions—an American Football League rookie record for pass receptions. That year, Clancy led the Dolphins in receiving yardage and receptions, and finished eighth in the AFL in reception yards and third in receptions. He compiled three 100-yard receiving games, and he was named to the AFL All-Star Game.

In their second season together, Griese and Clancy were roommates in the pre-season and appeared ready to have a big year. The young "Griese-Clancy combine" was expected to be "a major drawing card" for the young AFL franchise in 1968. In the first three pre-season games in 1968, they connected for 19 receptions and 284 yards. However, Clancy suffered a ruptured ligament in his left knee shortly after catching a pass against the Baltimore Colts in the final pre-season game on August 31, 1968. Clancy underwent surgery and missed the 1968 season. Clancy watched the Dolphins from the sidelines with his leg in a cast, as Karl Noonan took over at split end and led the AFL in touchdown catches in 1968.

In April 1969, Clancy got married and went on a honeymoon trip around the world, swimming, surfing and "getting some sun." He said, however, marriage had not reduced his desire to play football. "Just the opposite", he said. "I'm more hungry than ever. I want to make that money." After a season on crutches, the UPI reported: "The former rookie wonder wants to get back under quarterback Bob Griese's passes, to reclaim his billing as the Miami Dolphins' top receiver. Despite a scar on his knee, Clancy was dashing, cutting and jumping for passes during summer workouts. However, even Clancy acknowledged the injury had slowed him down: "I'm still a couple of steps slower than before the operation. But I'm optimistic. It doesn't pain me. I figure I have a month to work the way I want to, I'll be all right." Clancy's comeback appeared to be on track in early November, as he was a close second among Miami receivers with 21 catches for 289 yards. However, the comeback was cut short on November 2, 1969, when he suffered torn ligaments, this time to his right knee in a loss to the New York Jets. Clancy missed the final six games of the 1969 season due to the injury.

=== Green Bay Packers ===
In May 1970, Clancy was traded by the Dolphins to the Green Bay Packers for tight end Marv Fleming. Clancy had begun a business selling real estate in Miami during the offseason, but he also had ties to Green Bay. He had attended St. Matthew's Grade School there in the 1950s. Clancy expressed mixed emotions about the trade: "I don't like to leave Miami. You hate to have to pick up and move and I definitely plan to come back (to Miami) in the offseason. But most of my dad's family are still up in Green Bay. He's always wanted me to play for the Packers." Clancy was greeted as the first Green Bay native to play for the Packers since Wayland Becker in 1938. Wisconsin columnist Lee Remmel said Clancy "surveys the football scene with a pair of cool, calculating blue eyes and a computer-type mind."

In an August 1970 exhibition game against the New York Giants, Clancy caught four passes for 110 yards. Packers coach Phil Bengtson said after the game, "He has a knack of knowing where the ball will be. Clancy doesn't have great speed, but he has the ability to recognize defenses and take advantage of them." While Clancy played in all 14 games for the Packers in 1970, he caught only 16 passes, leading one Green Bay writer to conclude that Clancy's "anemic production" resulted in double-teaming of flanker Carroll Dale and an unbalanced passing offense. Clancy finished fifth in receptions on the 1970 Packers, behind Dale, tight end John Hilton, running back Donny Anderson, and even fullback Jim Grabowski.

Clancy tried out for the Packers again in 1971, but he was cut in August before the season started. While attempting to make a comeback with the Dolphins in July 1972, Clancy suffered another injury, this time to his back, resulting in Clancy being placed in traction for ten days in a Miami hospital. In all, Clancy played in 36 games for the Dolphins and Packers, compiling professional career totals of 104 receptions for 1,301 yards. Rick Norton was Clancy's teammate both in Miami and Green Bay.

== Career statistics ==
=== College ===
Year	Team	G	Rec.	Yds	Avg	TDs	Rushes	Yards	Avg.	TD	Kickoff	Yards	Avg.	TD	Punts	Yards	Avg	TD
1963	Michigan		4	78	19.5	1	34	131	3.2	0	9	221	24.6	0	10	105	10.5	0
1965	Michigan		52	762	14.7	5	0	0	0	0	0	0	0	0	0	0	0	0
1966	Michigan		76	1077	14.2	4	0	0	0	0	2	7	3.5	0	0	0	0	0
Total			132	1917	14.5	10	34	131	3.2	0	11	228	20.7	0	10	105	10.5	0

=== Professional ===
Year	Team	G	Rec.	Yds	Avg	TDs	Rushes	Yards	Avg.	TD	Kickoff	Yards	Avg.	TD	Punts	Yards	Avg	TD
1967	Miami	14	67	868	13.0	2	3	−4	−1.3	0	0	0	0	0	0	0	0	0
1969	Miami	8	21	289	13.8	1	0	0	0	0	0	0	0	0	0	0	0	0
1970	Green Bay	14	16	244	15.3	2	0	0	0	0	0	0	0	0	0	0	0	0
Total		36	104	1,401	13.5	5	3	−4	−1.3	0	0	0	0	0	0	0	0	0

==== 100-yard games ====
Week	Day	Date	Team	Opponent	Score	Rec.	Yards	TDs	Avg.
4	Sun	October 8, 1967	MIA	KAN	0–41	6	102	0	17
9	Sun	November 19, 1967	MIA	OAK	17–31	8	114	0	14.3
11	Sun	December 3, 1967	MIA	HOU	14–17	7	126	1	18

Note: all games were road losses.

== See also ==
- Lists of Michigan Wolverines football receiving leaders
- List of Michigan Wolverines football All-Americans
- University of Michigan Athletic Hall of Honor
