= B. J. Askew =

American football player (born 1980)

No. 35
- Position: Fullback

Personal information
- Born: August 19, 1980 (age 46); Cincinnati, Ohio, U.S.
- Listed height: 6 ft 3 in (1.91 m)
- Listed weight: 233 lb (106 kg)

Career information
- High school: Colerain (Cincinnati, Ohio)
- College: Michigan
- NFL draft: 2003: 3rd round, 85th overall pick

Career history
- New York Jets (2003–2006); Tampa Bay Buccaneers (2007–2009)

Career NFL statistics
- Rushing attempts: 35
- Rushing yards: 116
- Rushing touchdowns: 2
- Receptions: 45
- Receiving yards: 317
- Stats at Pro Football Reference

Bobby DeAngelo Askew Jr. (born August 19, 1980) is an American former professional football player who was a fullback in the National Football League (NFL). He played college football as the University of Michigan. He ranks third all-time among Michigan running backs in reception yards.

Askew was selected in the third round of the 2003 NFL draft by the New York Jets, the first out of eight fullbacks taken in the draft. He has also played for the Tampa Bay Buccaneers.

== Early life ==
Askew attended Colerain High School in Cincinnati, Ohio, and was a letterwinner in football, basketball, and track & field. In basketball, he averaged 10 points per game as a junior. Askew graduated from Colerain High School in 1999.

== Professional career ==
Askew was selected 85th overall in the third round of the 2003 NFL draft by the New York Jets.

Askew was later signed by the Buccaneers to back up Mike Alstott, but assumed starting duties when Alstott went down with a neck injury. On May 15, 2008, the team gave him a four-year contract extension. It was a five-year deal worth $8.6 million, making him one of the league's highest-paid fullbacks.

On April 26, 2010, the Buccaneers released Askew.
