= Jason Vinson =

American football punter

Profile
- Position: Punter

Personal information
- Born: c. 1976

Career information
- College: University of Michigan (1997-1998)

Awards and highlights
- National champion (1997); Second-team All-Big Ten (1997)

Jason Vinson (born c. 1976) is an American former football punter. He was the starting punter for the Michigan Wolverines football team from 1997 to 1998, including the national champion 1997 Michigan Wolverines football team. He became Michigan's starting punter despite having been a walk-on who had never appeared as a starter in a football game at the high school level.

Vinson attended high school in Troy, Michigan. He played football in high school, but as a second-string punter.

Vinson enrolled at the University of Michigan without an athletic scholarship and did not initially try out for the football team. Instead, he played intramural flag football as a freshman. Having never punted in an actual football game, Vinson twice tried out unsuccessfully for a spot on the roster of the Michigan Wolverines football team. He ultimately made the team as a walk-on in 1995.

After spending the 1995 and 1996 seasons on the bench, Vinson became the starting punter for the undefeated 1997 national championship team. In his first game on September 13, 1997, Vinson punted five times for an average of 42.4 yards. He was selected as a second-team All-Big Ten punter after the 1997 season. He was Michigan's starting punter again during the 1998 season. In two years as the Wolverines' punter, Vinson handled 113 punts, good for 4,376 yards and an average of 38.7 yards per punt.
