= Barry Gardner =

American football player (born 1976)

No. 52, 55, 53
- Position: Linebacker

Personal information
- Born: December 13, 1976 (age 49); Harvey, Illinois, U.S.
- Listed height: 6 ft 1 in (1.85 m)
- Listed weight: 245 lb (111 kg)

Career information
- High school: Thornton (Harvey)
- College: Northwestern
- NFL draft: 1999: 2nd round, 35th overall pick

Career history
- Philadelphia Eagles (1999–2002); Cleveland Browns (2003–2004); New York Jets (2005); New England Patriots (2006)

Awards and highlights
- 2× First-team All-Big Ten (1997, 1998)

Career NFL statistics
- Total tackles: 277
- Sacks: 2.0
- Forced fumbles: 5
- Fumble recoveries: 3
- Interceptions: 1
- Stats at Pro Football Reference

Barry Allan Gardner (born December 13, 1976) is an American former professional football player who was a linebacker in the National Football League (NFL). He was selected in the second round of the 1999 NFL draft with the 35th overall pick.

Pre-draft measurables
Height	Weight	40-yard dash	10-yard split	20-yard split	20-yard shuttle	Three-cone drill	Vertical jump	Broad jump	Bench press
6 ft 1 in (1.85 m)	242 lb (110 kg)	4.71 s	1.65 s	2.66 s	4.32 s	7.42 s	33.0 in (0.84 m)	9 ft 5 in (2.87 m)	25 reps
All values from NFL Combine

Gardner was an eight-year veteran and played for the Philadelphia Eagles, Cleveland Browns, New York Jets, and New England Patriots. Gardner has primarily been used and known around the league as a solid special teams player. He graduated from Thornton Township High School, then played college football for the Northwestern Wildcats.
