= Andre Weathers =

American football player (born 1976)

Profile
- Position: Cornerback

Personal information
- Born: August 6, 1976 (age 50); Flint, Michigan, U.S.

Career information
- College: Michigan
- NFL draft: 1999: 6th round, 205th overall pick

Career history
- 1999–2000: New York Giants

Awards and highlights
- National champion (1997); First-team All-Big Ten (1997); Second-team All-Big Ten (1998)
- Stats at Pro Football Reference

Andre Le'Melle Weathers (born August 6, 1976) is an American former professional football player. He played college football at the University of Michigan from 1995 to 1998 and was a member of the 1997 team that won the national championship. He later played football for the New York Giants in 2000 and 2001, but his career was cut short by a knee injury.

== University of Michigan ==
Weathers was a standout wide receiver and defensive back at Flint Central High School, and earned a scholarship to play defensive back at the University of Michigan. Weathers was a defensive back for the Wolverines for four years from 1995 to 1998. He played on Michigan's 1997 national championship team and had a 43-yard interception run-back for the winning touchdown in a 20–14 victory over Ohio State. Weathers also had a key sack of Ryan Leaf in Michigan's victory over Washington State in the 1998 Rose Bowl. With the media attention focused on his teammate Charles Woodson, Weathers was sometimes referred to by the press in 1997 as Michigan's "other cornerback." Because of Woodson's abilities, opponents regularly "threw at Weathers, not wanting to test Woodson." Weathers noted, "I like a challenge, but when you're expecting every ball to come at you, well, sometimes you want a little break." In 1998, following Woodson's departure, Weathers was the leader of a Michigan secondary that remained one of the best in college football.

During his four-year career at Michigan, Weathers had 84 tackles and 5 interceptions.

== New York Giants ==
In April 1999, Weathers was selected by the New York Giants in the sixth round of the 1999 NFL draft with the 205th overall pick. He signed with the Giants in July 1999. During the Giants' 1999 training camp, Weathers was nicknamed "Nonchalant" for his somewhat carefree attitude. Weathers made the final cut and played in the Giants' season opener against the Tampa Bay Buccaneers. In that game, his first in the NFL, Weathers intercepted a pass off Trent Dilfer and returned it for the winning touchdown as the Giants defeated Buccaneers, 17–13.

After the Tampa Bay game, Weathers was the subject of a feature stories in The New York Times and the New York Daily News. Weathers described his thoughts as he intercepted Dilfer's pass, "I know he couldn't see me, because I couldn't even see him. I didn't actually see the ball until it was right on top of me. My eyes got big, and I didn't have time to think about it. I thought only about holding onto the ball and going in. The end zone was there, and when I didn't see anybody in front of me I knew it was a touchdown." The Daily News reported, "Only a week ago, rookie Andre Weathers was sweating out the final cuts, and if not for the injuries to Jason Sehorn and Conrad Hamilton that created a need for cornerbacks, who knows? But there he was yesterday, making perhaps the biggest play of the 17-13 win over the Bucs as he returned an interception eight yards for the go-ahead touchdown in the third quarter." Veteran cornerback Phillippi Sparks said of Weathers, "That kid can be special if he works at it. He reminds me of myself. He's a little lackadaisical in practice because he knows he has skills. If he works at it, he can be a great player, and I won't let him do anything else."

Weathers appeared in nine games for the Giants during the 1999 NFL season. However, he tore the anterior cruciate ligament in his right knee during a November 1999 game against the Indianapolis Colts. Weathers underwent knee surgery in November 1999.

Weathers returned to the Giants at the end of October 2000. At the time of his return, Weathers noted, "It's going to be exciting and nervous at the same time. I'm anxious to get out there and see what I can do." The New York Daily News reported, "Weathers doesn't pretend that the knee is as sound as it had been. Most doctors agree that it takes about two years after major knee surgery for a 100% recovery." In his first game back, he immediately sustained a tear in the anterior cruciate knee ligaments to end his season. At the time, the New York Post noted: "This is especially cruel news for Weathers, who last Sunday made his debut this season. A rookie in 1999, Weathers showed plenty of promise before tearing his left ACL in the ninth game of the season. The Giants were cautious in bringing Weathers back, but he reinjured the same knee in the 24–7 victory over the Philadelphia Eagles, will again need surgery and faces another year-long rehab." Weathers attempted a comeback with the Giants in 2001, but did not make the team. He was released by the Giants in August 2001.

== Later life ==
After retiring from football, Weathers returned to his hometown, Flint, Michigan. He worked as a high school football coach at Flint Central High School and with the Genesee County Patriots semi-pro team.
