= Sam Sword =

American football player (born 1974)

No. 56, 98
- Position: Linebacker

Personal information
- Born: December 4, 1974 (age 51); Saginaw, Michigan, U.S.
- Listed height: 6 ft 1 in (1.85 m)
- Listed weight: 245 lb (111 kg)

Career information
- High school: Arthur Hill (Saginaw)
- College: Michigan (1995-1998)
- NFL draft: 1999: undrafted

Career history
- Oakland Raiders (1999); Indianapolis Colts (2000–2002)

Awards and highlights
- National Champion (1997); Second-team All-American (1997); First-team All-Big Ten (1997); Second-team All-Big Ten (1998)

Career NFL statistics
- Total tackles: 91
- Sacks: 2
- Forced fumbles: 2
- Pass deflections: 5
- Stats at Pro Football Reference

Sam Lee-Arthur Sword (born December 9, 1974) is an American former professional football player who was a linebacker in the National Football League (NFL). Sword played four seasons in the NFL for the Oakland Raiders and Indianapolis Colts. He played college football at Michigan, where he was the leading tackler on the undefeated 1997 Michigan Wolverines football team that led the country in scoring defense and total defense and was ranked #1 in the final AP Poll. He led Michigan in tackles for three consecutive years, and his 265 solo tackles ranks third in school history.

== Early life ==
Sword was born in Saginaw, Michigan, in 1974. He attended Arthur Hill High School in Saginaw. Sword played football, basketball and baseball at Arthur Hill. He played middle linebacker and tight end for the football team, led the 1991 team to a state championship, and received all-state honors. He was later inducted into the Saginaw County Sports Hall of Fame.

== University of Michigan ==
Sword enrolled at the University of Michigan in 1994 and played college football for head coach Lloyd Carr's Wolverines football teams from 1995 to 1998. After redshirting in 1994, he started four games at inside linebacker in 1995.

As a sophomore in 1996, Sword started all 12 games at inside linebacker for Michigan. He led the team with 108 tackles, including 72 solo tackles.

As a junior, Sword started 11 games at inside linebacker for the undefeated 1997 Michigan Wolverines football team that outscored opponents 322–144, won the Big Ten Conference championship, defeated Washington State in the 1998 Rose Bowl, and was ranked #1 in the final AP Poll. He had a career-high 13 solo tackles against Notre Dame and was the team's leading tackler (91 tackles, including 69 solo tackles) on a 1997 squad that led the country in both scoring defense (8.9 points per game) and total defense (206.9 yards per game). At the end of the season, he was selected by a Midwest media panel as a first-team linebacker on the 1997 All-Big Ten team.

As a senior in 1998, Sword started 12 games and led the team with 127 tackles, including 93 solo tackles. He was also selected as a second-team All-Big Ten player by both the conference coaches and media. He became the second player in Michigan history to lead the team in tackles three consecutive years. (Erick Anderson led the team in tackles four consecutive years from 1988 to 1991.)

In four years at Michigan, Sword started 39 games and totaled 370 tackles, including 265 solo tackles, five pass breakups, three fumble recoveries, and one interception. His 265 solo tackle ranks third in Michigan history behind Jarrett Irons (296) and Erick Anderson (286). He was named the 1997 and 1998 winner of The Roger Zatkoff Award as the team's best linebacker.

== Professional football ==
Sword was undrafted in the 1999 NFL draft but signed as a free agent with the Oakland Raiders. He appeared in 10 games for the Raiders, five of them as a starter, during the 1999 season. In 2000, Sword joined the Indianapolis Colts and remained with the club for three seasons. He appeared in all 16 regular season games in 2001 and 2002, principally as a special teams player, and started three games at linebacker. In four NFL seasons, Sword appeared in 45 games, eight as a starter at linebacker, and recorded 91 tackles and two sacks.
