= Jerame Tuman =

American football player (born 1976)

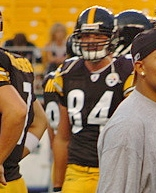
- Tuman with the Pittsburgh Steelers in 2005

No. 84
- Position: Tight end

Personal information
- Born: March 24, 1976 (age 50); Liberal, Kansas, U.S.
- Listed height: 6 ft 4 in (1.93 m)
- Listed weight: 253 lb (115 kg)

Career information
- High school: Liberal
- College: Michigan
- NFL draft: 1999: 5th round, 136th overall pick

Career history
- Pittsburgh Steelers (1999–2007); Arizona Cardinals (2008)

Awards and highlights
- Super Bowl champion (XL); National champion (1997); First-team All-American (1997); 3× First-team All-Big Ten (1996, 1997, 1998)

Career NFL statistics
- Receptions: 46
- Receiving yards: 541
- Receiving touchdowns: 7
- Stats at Pro Football Reference

Jerame Dean Tuman (born March 24, 1976) is an American former professional football player who was a tight end in the National Football League (NFL), primarily for the Pittsburgh Steelers. He played college football for the Michigan Wolverines, earning first-team All-American honors in 1997. Tuman was selected by the Steelers in the fifth round of the 1999 NFL draft. He won Super Bowl XL with the Steelers. He also has played in the NFL for the Arizona Cardinals.

== Early life ==
Tuman played both tight end and defensive end at Liberal High School. He was a Prep Football Report All-America and All-Midlands selection and rated the fifth-best tight end prospect in the nation by Blue Chip Illustrated. He also earned a state championship during his junior year. Tuman also lettered in track while competing in the discus, triple jump and sprint relays.

== College career ==
Tuman played college football at the University of Michigan, playing tight end. He joined the Wolverines in 1995, and graduated after the 1998 season, earning first-team All-Big Ten honors in 1996, 1997, and 1998. He was also named an All-American by several news outlets in 1997.

Tuman was the starting tight end for the 1997 undefeated team named national champions by the Associated Press, and scored the decisive touchdown in the 1998 Rose Bowl victory over Washington State which secured their undefeated season.

During his time at Michigan, Tuman was part of an offensive bread and butter play with quarterback Brian Griese, in which Griese rolled out on a play-action bootleg to find an open Tuman. The play was run successfully throughout the 1997 season, including 4 times against Colorado and for a go-ahead score in the 1998 Rose Bowl.

== Professional career ==
=== Pittsburgh Steelers ===
He was selected with the third pick of the fifth round (136th overall) of the 1999 NFL draft by the Pittsburgh Steelers. He spent 9 years with the Steelers, primarily as the second-string tight end. Most of his playing time was during two tight end sets and on special teams. On February 22, 2008, he was released by the Steelers.

=== Arizona Cardinals ===
On March 3, 2008, the Arizona Cardinals signed Tuman to a two-year contract. Ken Whisenhunt, the head coach of the Cardinals, had previously served as tight ends coach and offensive coordinator for the Steelers during Tuman's time with the team.

Tuman was released by the Cardinals on December 24 after the team signed linebacker Victor Hobson. Tuman had appeared in three games for the Cardinals including two starts, catching three passes for 41 yards. On January 13, the Cardinals re-signed Tuman during the playoffs after tight end Stephen Spach was placed on injured reserve with a torn ACL.

== Personal ==
Jerame is married to Molly Tuman, sister of Tuman's former college teammate at Michigan, Scott Dreisbach. They have four children: one son, Canyon, and three daughters, Avery, Makenna and Mia.

Tuman was allegedly one of the Pittsburgh players impersonated by a con man, Brian Jackson in 2005, along with Brian St. Pierre and Ben Roethlisberger.

In 2017, Tuman served as an assistant football coach at North Allegheny Senior High School in Wexford, Pennsylvania.

== See also ==
- Lists of Michigan Wolverines football receiving leaders
