= Clarence Williams (running back, born 1977) =

American football player (born 1977)

No. 21
- Position: Running back

Personal information
- Born: May 16, 1977 (age 49); Detroit, Michigan, U.S.
- Listed height: 5 ft 9 in (1.75 m)
- Listed weight: 196 lb (89 kg)

Career information
- High school: Cass Technical (Detroit)
- College: Michigan
- NFL draft: 1999: undrafted

Career history
- Arizona Cardinals (1999–2000); Amsterdam Admirals (2001)

Awards and highlights
- National champion (1997)

Career NFL statistics
- Games played: 2
- Stats at Pro Football Reference

Clarence Williams (born May 16, 1977) is an American former professional football player who was a running back who played for the Arizona Cardinals of the National Football League (NFL). He played college football for the Michigan Wolverines. He led their 1996 team in rushing and was a member of their undefeated national champion 1997 team.

== College ==
Williams attended Detroit's Cass Technical High School, where as a senior one of his coaches was Thomas Wilcher. During his senior season, Cass had an undefeated 9–0 regular season before losing 22–21 to Warren De La Salle Collegiate High School in the Michigan High School Athletic Association playoffs. The team compiled a 319–56 points differential.

In his four years at the University of Michigan from 1995–1998, he accumulated 1986 yards rushing on 467 carries and added 682 yards receiving on 68 receptions and 587 return yards on 30 kickoff returns. His best game as a collegian was against the Boston College Eagles when he rushed for 133 yards on 25 carries, and had 43 yards receiving on 3 receptions.

As a sophomore in 1996, he led the Wolverines with 837 yards rushing yards on 202 carries. He also had 361 yards in receiving on 27 receptions. Junior tailback Chris Howard only played in 10 of the 12 games but added 725 yards.

As a junior, the rushing load was carried by Chris Howard and freshman Anthony Thomas and Williams only played in 9 games. Williams only totaled 276 yards on 59 carries to finish third in rushing. The team had no 1000-yard rushers and no 500-yard receivers. However, the team went an undefeated 12–0 to win the National Championship behind its strong defense led by 1997 Heisman Trophy winner Charles Woodson.

As a senior, he rushed for 100 yards twice but was only able to total 646 yards on 146 carries and had no touchdowns. He also had 14 receptions for 102 yards without any touchdowns. The team was led in rushing by Anthony Thomas who totaled 893 yards on 167 carries and who had 15 rushing touchdowns.

== Professional career ==
Williams went undrafted in the 1999 NFL draft, but he played briefly for the Arizona Cardinals of the National Football League from 1999-2000. He did not carry the ball as a professional and had one reception for 5 yards.
