= Jeff Backus =

American football player (born 1977)

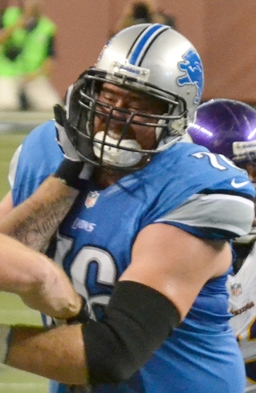
- Backus with the Detroit Lions in 2012

No. 76
- Position: Offensive tackle

Personal information
- Born: September 21, 1977 (age 49); Midland, Michigan, U.S.
- Listed height: 6 ft 5 in (1.96 m)
- Listed weight: 305 lb (138 kg)

Career information
- High school: Norcross (Norcross, Georgia)
- College: Michigan (1996–2000)
- NFL draft: 2001: 1st round, 18th overall pick

Career history
- Detroit Lions (2001–2012)

Awards and highlights
- PFWA All-Rookie Team (2001); National champion (1997); Second-team All-American (2000); 2× First-team All-Big Ten (1999, 2000); 2× Second-team All-Big Ten (1997, 1998)

Career NFL statistics
- Games played: 191
- Games started: 191
- Fumble recoveries: 6
- Stats at Pro Football Reference

Jeffrey Carl Backus (born September 21, 1977) is an American former professional football player who was an offensive tackle in the National Football League (NFL). He played college football for the University of Michigan. He was selected with the 18th pick in the first round of the 2001 NFL draft by the Detroit Lions and played his entire 12-year career for the team.

== Early life ==
Backus attended Norcross High School and was a standout in football and baseball. He spent his freshman year at Marist School in Dunwoody before returning to Norcross, where he played his middle school years. In football, as a senior, he was a USA Today All-America selection, and was chosen by the Gwinnett Touchdown Club as the Gwinnett Touchdown Club's Lineman of the Year.

== Professional career ==
Pre-draft measurables
Height	Weight	Arm length	Hand span	40-yard dash	10-yard split	20-yard split	20-yard shuttle	Three-cone drill	Vertical jump	Broad jump	Bench press
6 ft 5 1/2 in (1.97 m)	310 lb (141 kg)	32 1/2 in (0.83 m)	9 1/2 in (0.24 m)	5.33 s	1.81 s	3.01 s	4.67 s	8.27 s	27 in (0.69 m)	8 ft 3 in (2.51 m)	25 reps
All measurables were taken at the NFL Scouting Combine. See also the scouting report.

In July 2001, Backus signed a $7 million 5-year contract with the Detroit Lions, including a $3.2 million signing bonus. In July 2006, Jeff Backus signed a $40 million 6-year contract with the Lions. On November 22, 2012, Backus' streak of starting and playing in 186 consecutive games ended due to injury. On March 14, 2013, Backus retired.

== Post-playing career ==
Backus became a part-time coaching intern with the Detroit Lions after his retirement from playing football.
