= Josh Williams (defensive tackle) =

American football player (born 1976)

No. 96
- Position: Defensive tackle

Personal information
- Born: August 9, 1976 (age 50); Denver, Colorado, U.S.
- Listed height: 6 ft 3 in (1.91 m)
- Listed weight: 285 lb (129 kg)

Career information
- High school: Cypress Creek (Houston, Texas)
- College: Michigan
- NFL draft: 2000: 4th round, 120th overall pick

Career history
- Indianapolis Colts (2000–2005); New Orleans Saints (2006)*
- * Offseason or practice squad member only

Awards and highlights
- National champion (1997); Second-team All-Big Ten (1997)

Career NFL statistics
- Tackles: 173
- Sacks: 8
- Forced fumbles: 3
- Stats at Pro Football Reference

Josh Sinclair Williams (born August 9, 1976) is an American former professional football player who was a defensive tackle in the National Football League (NFL) for the Indianapolis Colts from 2000 to 2005. He played college football for the Michigan Wolverines.

== Career ==
Williams grew up in the Houston, Texas area and attended Cypress Creek High School. He played college football for the University of Michigan from 1996 to 1999.

Pre-draft measurables
Height	Weight	Arm length	Hand span	40-yard dash	10-yard split	20-yard split	20-yard shuttle	Three-cone drill	Vertical jump	Broad jump
6 ft 3 1/2 in (1.92 m)	282 lb (128 kg)	32 1/8 in (0.82 m)	10 in (0.25 m)	4.91 s	1.71 s	2.86 s	4.25 s	7.22 s	30.5 in (0.77 m)	9 ft 3 in (2.82 m)
All values from NFL Combine

He was selected by the Indianapolis Colts in the fourth round (122nd overall pick) of the 2000 NFL draft. He played six seasons as a defensive tackle for the Colts from 2000 to 2005, appearing in 73 NFL games.

== NFL career statistics ==
Legend
**Bold**	Career high

=== Regular season ===
Year	Team	Games		Tackles					Interceptions					Fumbles			
Year	Team	GP	GS	Cmb	Solo	Ast	Sck	TFL	Int	Yds	TD	Lng	PD	FF	FR	Yds	TD
2000	IND	14	7	41	26	15	**3.0**	3	0	0	0	0	0	**1**	1	0	0
2001	IND	**16**	**16**	**50**	**30**	**20**	**3.0**	4	0	0	0	0	**2**	0	1	0	0
2002	IND	7	3	14	10	4	1.0	1	0	0	0	0	1	0	0	0	0
2003	IND	**16**	4	26	19	7	1.0	**6**	0	0	0	0	0	0	0	0	0
2004	IND	**16**	15	36	29	7	0.0	1	0	0	0	0	1	**1**	**2**	0	0
2005	IND	4	3	6	3	3	0.0	0	0	0	0	0	0	**1**	0	0	0
Career		73	48	173	117	56	8.0	15	0	0	0	0	4	3	4	0	0

=== Playoffs ===
Year	Team	Games		Tackles					Interceptions					Fumbles			
Year	Team	GP	GS	Cmb	Solo	Ast	Sck	TFL	Int	Yds	TD	Lng	PD	FF	FR	Yds	TD
2000	IND	1	0	2	2	0	0.0	0	0	0	0	0	0	0	0	0	0
2002	IND	1	0	1	0	**1**	0.0	0	0	0	0	0	0	0	0	0	0
2003	IND	**3**	0	2	2	0	0.0	**1**	0	0	0	0	0	0	0	0	0
2004	IND	2	**1**	**7**	**6**	**1**	0.0	0	0	0	0	0	0	0	0	0	0
Career		7	1	12	10	2	0.0	1	0	0	0	0	0	0	0	0	0
