= Chris Howard (American football) =

American football player (born 1975)

No. 24
- Position: Running back

Personal information
- Born: May 5, 1975 (age 51); Kenner, Louisiana, U.S.
- Listed height: 5 ft 10 in (1.78 m)
- Listed weight: 221 lb (100 kg)

Career information
- High school: John Curtis Christian (River Ridge, Louisiana)
- College: Michigan
- NFL draft: 1998: 5th round, 153rd overall pick

Career history
- Denver Broncos (1998)*; Jacksonville Jaguars (1998–2000); Oakland Raiders (2001)*
- * Offseason or practice squad member only

Awards and highlights
- National champion (1997); MVP (1998 Hula Bowl)

Career NFL statistics
- Rushing yards: 123
- Rushing average: 3
- Receptions: 5
- Receiving yards: 37
- Total touchdowns: 1
- Stats at Pro Football Reference

Christopher L. Howard (born May 5, 1975) is an American former professional football player who was a running back in the National Football League (NFL) for the Jacksonville Jaguars. Howard had been selected by the Denver Broncos in the fifth round of the 1998 NFL draft. His professional career was haunted by fumble troubles, which caused the Broncos to release him before he played a regular season game for them. Howard began to have fumble problems again when the Jaguars acquired and promoted him to a role as a regular player.

He had previously played college football for the Michigan Wolverines winning a national championship in his final year 1997. Howard led the national champion Wolverines team in rushing and was a MVP in the 1998 Hula Bowl. Chris attended Louisiana high school football powerhouse, John Curtis Christian High School in River Ridge, Louisiana. He was formerly married to Gabrielle Union.

== Early life ==
Howard was born in Kenner, Louisiana. He enrolled at Michigan after playing for Louisiana High School football powerhouse John Curtis Christian High School.

== College career ==
In four years at the University of Michigan from 1994 to 1997, he totaled 1876 yards rushing on 418 carries and added 429 yards receiving on 60 receptions. He totaled nine 100-yard rushing efforts for Michigan including four during the 1997 championship season. In college, his biggest rushing effort was 127 yards against the Minnesota Golden Gophers in 1996. However, he once rushed for 109 yards and 4 touchdowns against the UCLA Bruins. In addition, Howard also posted the fourth longest rush in school history, an 86-yard rush.

In 1996, he had five 100-yard games despite only playing in ten games as a junior. He totaled 725 yards rushing and ten touchdowns in the ten games. However, he was second on the team in rushing to sophomore Clarence Williams who tallied 837 yards in 12 games.

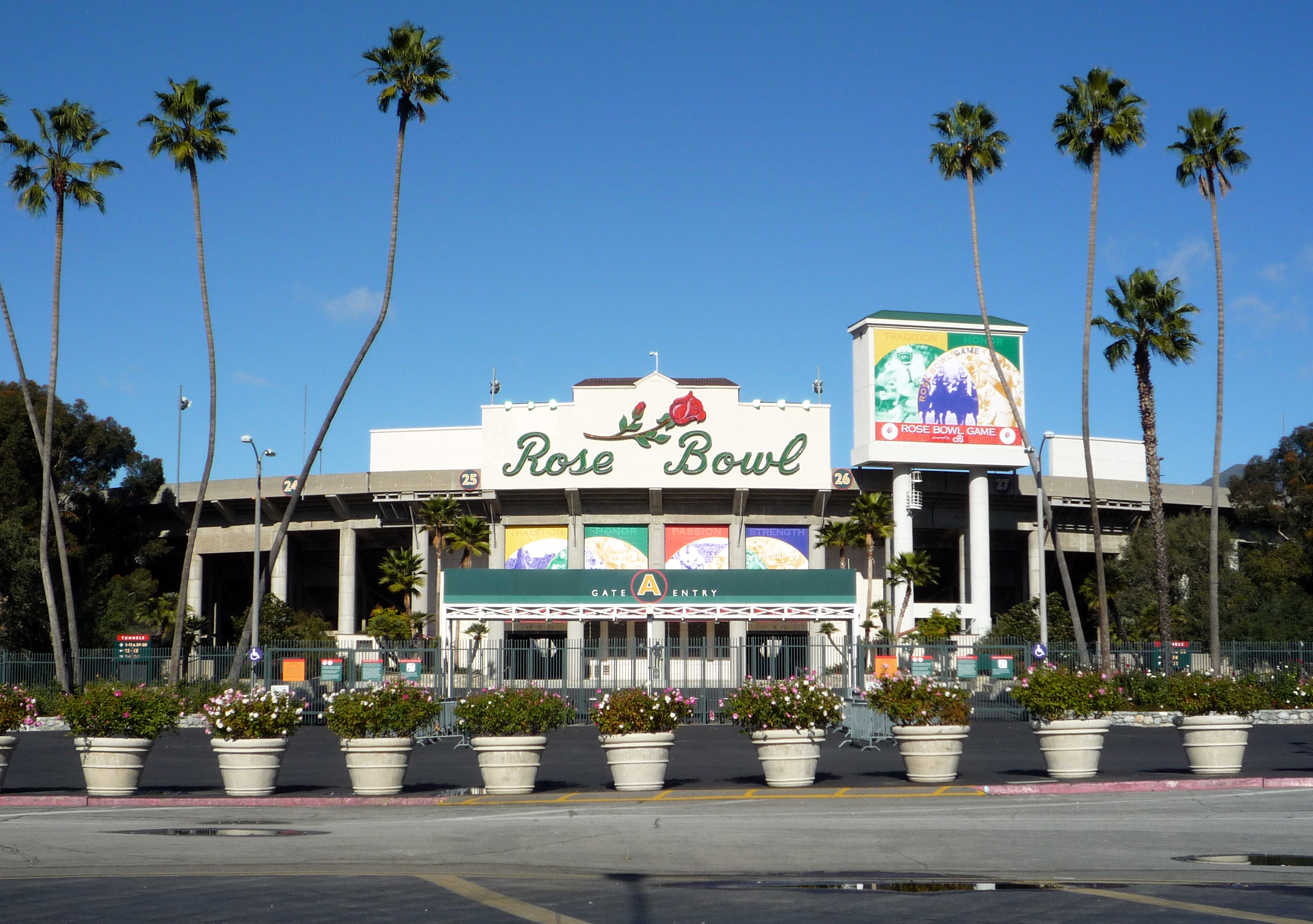
Howard helped the 1997 Team win the national championship as the leading rusher in the 1998 Rose Bowl.

In the 1997 championship season, he was the rushing leader for an undefeated 12–0 Michigan team that did not have a 1000-yard rusher or 500-yard receiver. The team emphasized defense behind 1997 Heisman Trophy winning defensive back Charles Woodson. Howard totaled 938 yards rushing on 199 carries and 276 yards receiving on 37 receptions. He was second on the team in scoring to placekicker Kraig Baker with 7 rushing touchdowns and 1 receiving touchdown. He was complemented in the backfield by freshman Anthony Thomas who added 549 yards and 5 rushing touchdowns.

One of the key games in Michigan's 1997 National Championship season was the game against the unbeaten Penn State Nittany Lions, then ranked Number 2 in the nation. Howard rushed for 120 yards and a touchdown in the win over the Nittany Lions, prompting Coach Lloyd Carr to comment: "I think that Chris Howard is a very underrated back. He proved that today." Michigan controlled the game and led 34–0 after 3 quarters behind Howard's best collegiate performance in terms of yards from scrimmage with 120 yards rushing and 41 yards receiving.

The 1997 season concluded with a 21–16 win over Washington State in the January 1, 1998 Rose Bowl. Howard led all rushers in the game with 70 yards rushing on 19 carries.

He was also the North MVP for the 1998 edition of the Hula Bowl, an invitational college football all-star game. He rushed for 116 yards on 14 carries and was involved in the culminating score in the North's second half comeback. He handed off to Joe Jurevicius on a reverse play which ended with Jurevicius passing to Brian Griese for a five-yard touchdown pass. The North would lose, however, when the missed extra point left the door open for a game-winning field goal.

== Professional career ==
Howard was selected by the Denver Broncos in the fifth round of the 1998 NFL draft, but he had a difficult pre-season with the Broncos in 1998, fumbling five times in two games. The Broncos released him from their practice squad in September 1998, and he was signed by the Jacksonville Jaguars. At the time, Jacksonville Coach Tom Coughlin said: "Chris Howard is a young man and he certainly still is developmental. A couple weeks into our system and I think he'll be a guy who can be counted on. But I'm not going to say we're done with our evaluations just yet." Coughlin said of Howard's fumbles with Denver: "It was carelessness. Basically, we'll start from scratch with him fundamentally here." Howard had professional totals of 123 yards rushing on 41 carries and 37 yards receiving on five receptions. In 2000, his final year, he fumbled twice on only 21 carries in the first two games. These were his final two career NFL games.

== Personal life ==
On May 5, 2001, Howard married actress Gabrielle Union, whom he met in 1999. They separated in 2005 and their divorce was made final in April 2006.

== See also ==
- Lists of Michigan Wolverines football rushing leaders
