= Damon Moore =

American football player (born 1976)

No. 43
- Position: Safety

Personal information
- Born: September 15, 1976 (age 50); Fostoria, Ohio, U.S.

Career information
- High school: Fostoria
- College: Ohio State
- NFL draft: 1999: 4th round, 128th overall pick

Career history
- Philadelphia Eagles (1999–2001); Chicago Bears (2002)

Awards and highlights
- 2× First-team All-Big Ten (1997, 1998); Second-team All-Big Ten (1996)

Career NFL statistics
- Total tackles: 188
- Sacks: 1
- Forced fumbles: 2
- Fumble recoveries: 3
- Interceptions: 6
- Defensive touchdowns: 1
- Stats at Pro Football Reference

Damon Moore (born September 15, 1976) is an American former professional football player who was a safety in the National Football League (NFL). He was selected by the Philadelphia Eagles in the fourth round of the 1999 NFL draft. He played college football for the Ohio State Buckeyes.

Moore also played for the Chicago Bears.

In 2001, Moore was charged with abandoning his 3-month-old Rottweiler puppy in a soccer field near his home in Voorhees, N.J.

In 2002, Moore was suspended without pay for the first four games of the season for violating the NFL Substance Abuse Policy.
