= 1997 All-Big Ten Conference football team =

American college football all-star team

The 1997 All-Big Ten Conference football team consists of American football players chosen as All-Big Ten Conference players for the 1997 Big Ten Conference football season. The conference recognizes two official All-Big Ten selectors: (1) the Big Ten conference coaches selected separate offensive and defensive units and named first- and second-team players (the "Coaches" team); and (2) a panel of sports writers and broadcasters covering the Big Ten also selected offensive and defensive units and named first- and second-team players (the "Media" team).

== Offensive selections ==
=== Quarterbacks ===
- Billy Dicken, Purdue (Coaches-1; Media-2)
- Brian Griese, Michigan (Coaches-2; Media-1)

=== Running backs ===
- Tavian Banks, Iowa (Coaches-1; Media-1)
- Curtis Enis, Penn State (Coaches-1; Media-1)
- Ron Dayne, Wisconsin (Coaches-2; Media-2)
- Sedrick Irvin, Michigan State (Coaches-2; Media-2)

=== Center ===
- Zach Adami, Michigan (Coaches-1; Media-1)
- Derek Rose, Iowa (Coaches-2; Media-2)

=== Guards ===
- Phil Ostrowski, Penn State (Coaches-1; Media-1)
- Steve Hutchinson, Michigan (Coaches-2; Media-1)
- Mike Golf, Iowa (Coaches-1)
- Rob Murphy, Ohio State (Coaches-2; Media-2)
- Scott Shaw, Michigan State (Media-2)

=== Tackles ===
- Flozell Adams, Michigan State (Coaches-1; Media-1)
- Jon Jansen, Michigan (Coaches-1; Media-2)
- Eric Gohlstin, Ohio State (Coaches-2; Media-1)
- Jeff Backus, Michigan (Coaches-2; Media-2)

=== Tight ends ===
- Jerame Tuman, Michigan (Coaches-1; Media-1)
- Josh Keur, Michigan State (Coaches-2; Media-2)

=== Receivers ===
- Brian Alford, Purdue (Coaches-1; Media-1)
- David Boston, Ohio State (Coaches-1; Media-1)
- Tim Dwight, Iowa (Coaches-2; Media-1)
- Joe Jurevicius, Penn State (Coaches-2; Media-2)
- Tutu Atwell, Minnesota (Coaches-2; Media-2)

== Defensive selections ==
=== Defensive linemen ===
- Casey Dailey, Northwestern (Coaches-1; Media-1)
- Jared DeVries, Iowa (Coaches-1; Media-1)
- Glen Steele, Michigan (Coaches-1; Media-1)
- Lamanzer Williams, Minnesota (Coaches-1; Media-1)
- Adewale Ogunleye, Indiana (Coaches-1; Media-2)
- Robaire Smith, Michigan State (Coaches-2; Media-2)
- Josh Williams, Michigan (Coaches-2; Media-2)
- Rosevelt Colvin, Purdue (Media-2)
- Courtney Brown, Penn State (Media-2)
- Tom Burke, Wisconsin (Media-2)

=== Linebackers ===
- Barry Gardner, Northwestern (Coaches-1; Media-1)
- Andy Katzenmoyer, Ohio State (Coaches-1; Media-1)
- Ike Reese, Michigan State (Coaches-1; Media-2)
- Sam Sword, Michigan (Coaches-2; Media-1)
- Aaron Collins, Penn State (Coaches-2; Media-2)
- Jim Nelson, Penn State (Coaches-2; Media-2)

=== Defensive backs ===
- Marcus Ray, Michigan (Coaches-1; Media-1)
- Antoine Winfield, Ohio State (Coaches-1; Media-1)
- Charles Woodson, Michigan (Coaches-1; Media-1)
- Damon Moore, Ohio State (Coaches-2; Media-1)
- Andre Weathers, Michigan (Coaches-1)
- Amp Campbell, Michigan State (Coaches-2; Media-2)
- Tyrone Carter, Minnesota (Coaches-2; Media-2)
- Eric Collier, Northwestern (Coaches-2; Media)
- Plez Atkins, Iowa (Coaches-2)
- Ray Hill, Michigan State (Media-2)

== Special teams ==
=== Kickers ===
- Matt Davenport, Wisconsin (Coaches-1; Media-2)
- Brian Gowins, Northwestern (Coaches-2; Media-1)

=== Punters ===
- Brent Bartholomew, Ohio State (Coaches-1; Media-1)
- Jason Vinson, Michigan (Coaches-2)
- Kevin Stemke, Wisconsin (Media-2)

== Key ==
Bold = selected as a first-team player by both the coaches and media panel

Coaches = selected by Big Ten Conference coaches

Media = selected by a media panel

== See also ==
- 1997 College Football All-America Team
