= Brent Bartholomew =

American football player (born 1976)

No. 2, 6, 12
- Position: Punter

Personal information
- Born: October 22, 1976 (age 50); Birmingham, Alabama, U.S.

Career information
- High school: Apopka (Apopka, Florida)
- College: Ohio State
- NFL draft: 1999: 6th round, 192nd overall pick

Career history
- Miami Dolphins (1999); Chicago Bears (2000); Washington Redskins (2003)*
- * Offseason or practice squad member only

Awards and highlights
- First-team All-Big Ten (1997); Second-team All-Big Ten (1998)

Career NFL statistics
- Punts: 51
- Yards: 1,915
- Average: 37.5
- Stats at Pro Football Reference

Brent Robert Bartholomew (born October 22, 1976) is an American former professional football player who was a punter of the National Football League (NFL).

== Football career ==
Bartholomew played college football for the Ohio State Buckeyes. He was selected 192nd overall by the Miami Dolphins in the sixth round of the 1999 NFL draft.

Bartholomew was also a member of the Chicago Bears and Washington Redskins.
