= Kevin Stemke =

American football player (born 1978)

No. 10, 2
- Position: Punter

Personal information
- Born: November 23, 1978 (age 47); Green Bay, Wisconsin, U.S.

Career information
- High school: Preble (Green Bay)
- College: Wisconsin
- NFL draft: 2001: undrafted

Career history
- Green Bay Packers (2001)*; St. Louis Rams (2002)*; Oakland Raiders (2002); Miami Dolphins (2003)*; Scottish Claymores (2003); Washington Redskins (2004)*; St. Louis Rams (2004)
- * Offseason or practice squad member only

Awards and highlights
- Ray Guy Award (2000); Third-team All-American (2000); 2× First-team All-Big Ten (1998, 2000); Second-team All-Big Ten (1997)

Career NFL statistics
- Punts: 33
- Punting yards: 1,327
- Punting average: 40.2
- Longest punt: 56
- Inside 20: 13
- Stats at Pro Football Reference

Kevin Stemke (born November 23, 1978) is an American former professional football player who was a punter in the National Football League (NFL). He played college football for the Wisconsin Badgers, winning the inaugural Ray Guy Award in 2000.

== Early life ==
Stemke was born in 1978 to Horst Stemke, a U.S. Olympic soccer player. He graduated from Green Bay's Preble High School in 1997, where he played quarterback.

== College career ==
He played for the Wisconsin Badgers. In his freshman year at Wisconsin, Stemke set the team punting record, averaging 43.9 yards per punt. In his sophomore year, he made the first-team in the Big Ten Conference. His senior year, Stemke broke his own school record, averaging 44.5 yards per punt, also the third-best in the nation. His 42.5 net yards was top in the United States, and received the first Ray Guy Award for the nation's top punter. Up until 2022, Stemke still held the Wisconsin records for highest punting average (43.5 yards) and total punting yards (10,660).

== Professional career ==
After going undrafted in the 2001 NFL draft, Stemke was signed by the Green Bay Packers in April 2001.

The Raiders signed Stemke in August 2002, where he played in two games before being cut. Stemke was signed by the Dolphins in January 2003, who in turn allocated him to the Scottish Claymores of NFL Europe, but waived him prior to the start of the NFL regular season. The Redskins cut Stemke in August 2004.

Stemke was signed as a free agent by the St. Louis Rams in November 2004 to replace Sean Landeta. He was released before the start of the 2005 season in favor of Reggie Hodges.

== After football ==
As of 2008, Stemke worked as director of business development for Replay Photos.

The Kevin Stemke Award is presented annually to the Wisconsin high school senior kicker/punter.

== Personal life ==
Stemke is married to Lizzy Fitzgerald Stemke, a former member of the United States women's national volleyball team.
