= Eric Mayes =

Professor, Motivational Speaker, Former American football player, and coach

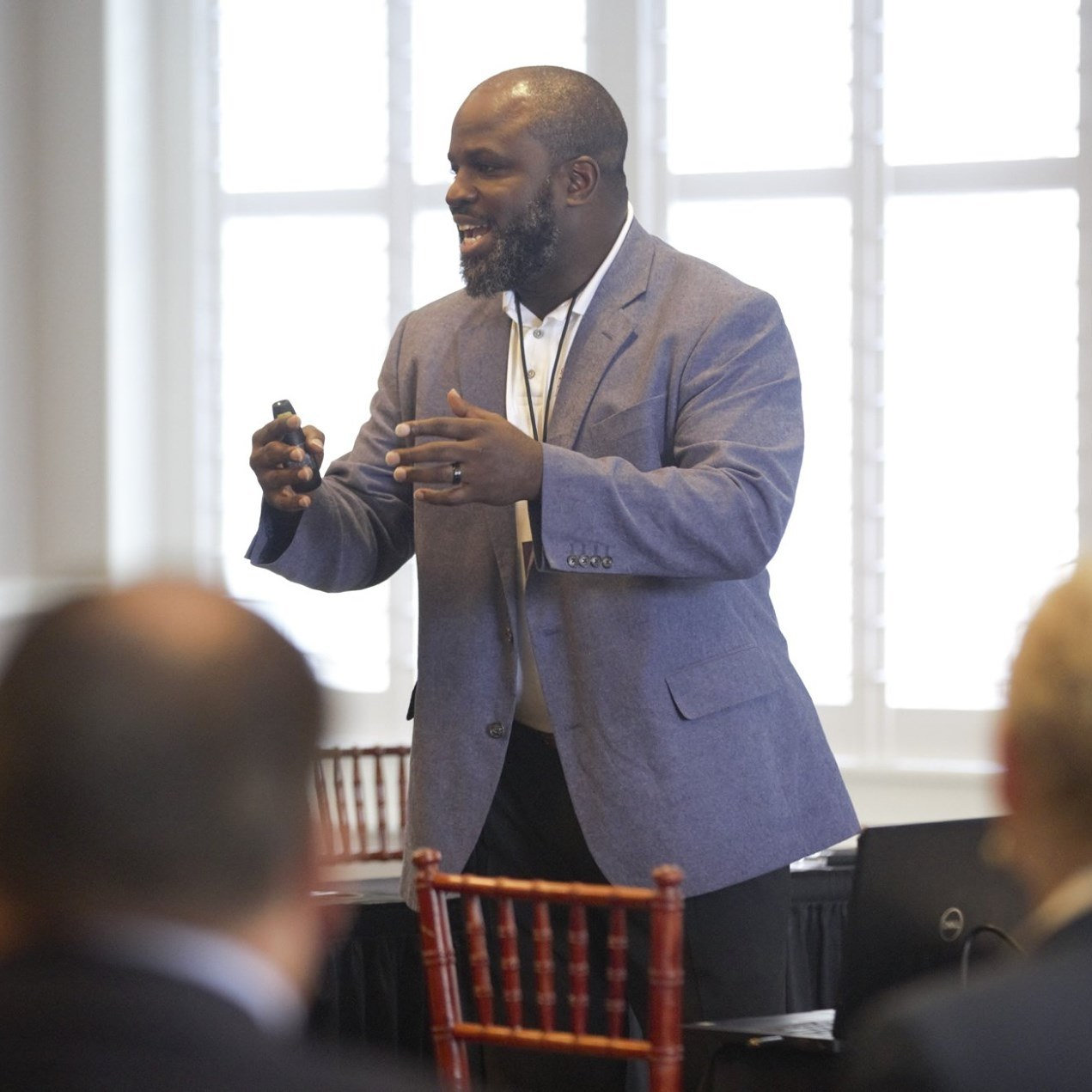
Image of Eric Mayes

Eric Mayes is a chief executive and professor, a former college football coach and American football linebacker. His research focuses on culture and cognition and leadership development.

Mayes played for the University of Michigan football team as a walk-on and was later elected co-captain of the undefeated 1997 Michigan Wolverines football team that won the Associated Press national championship. Mayes, called Zeus by his teammates, was such a motivational and inspirational leader that after suffering a season-ending injury during the teams national championship run, his teammates handed him the Big Ten Conference championship trophy, hoisted him on their shoulders and carried him off the field after defeating Ohio State at Michigan Stadium, 20–14. During the team's visit with Bill Clinton at the White House, Mayes shared remarks and presented the president with a Michigan jersey and made him an honorary "Michigan Man."

At the end of his playing career, Mayes enrolled in graduate school at the University of Michigan and worked with the University of Michigan football team on student-athlete development. He also spent time working with Central Michigan University Football team in recruitment and player development while on the faculty at Johns Hopkins University. After graduating with a Master of Science from the University of Michigan, Mayes worked as a high school technology teacher and coach in Detroit, before earning his Ph.D. from Howard University. He later graduated from Harvard University with a post doctorate master's degree focused on education policy and management. After working on national policy issues in Washington, D.C., Mayes joined the faculty at Johns Hopkins University. before going into higher education and transitioning into public sector executive leadership.
