= James Hall (defensive end) =

American football player (born 1977)

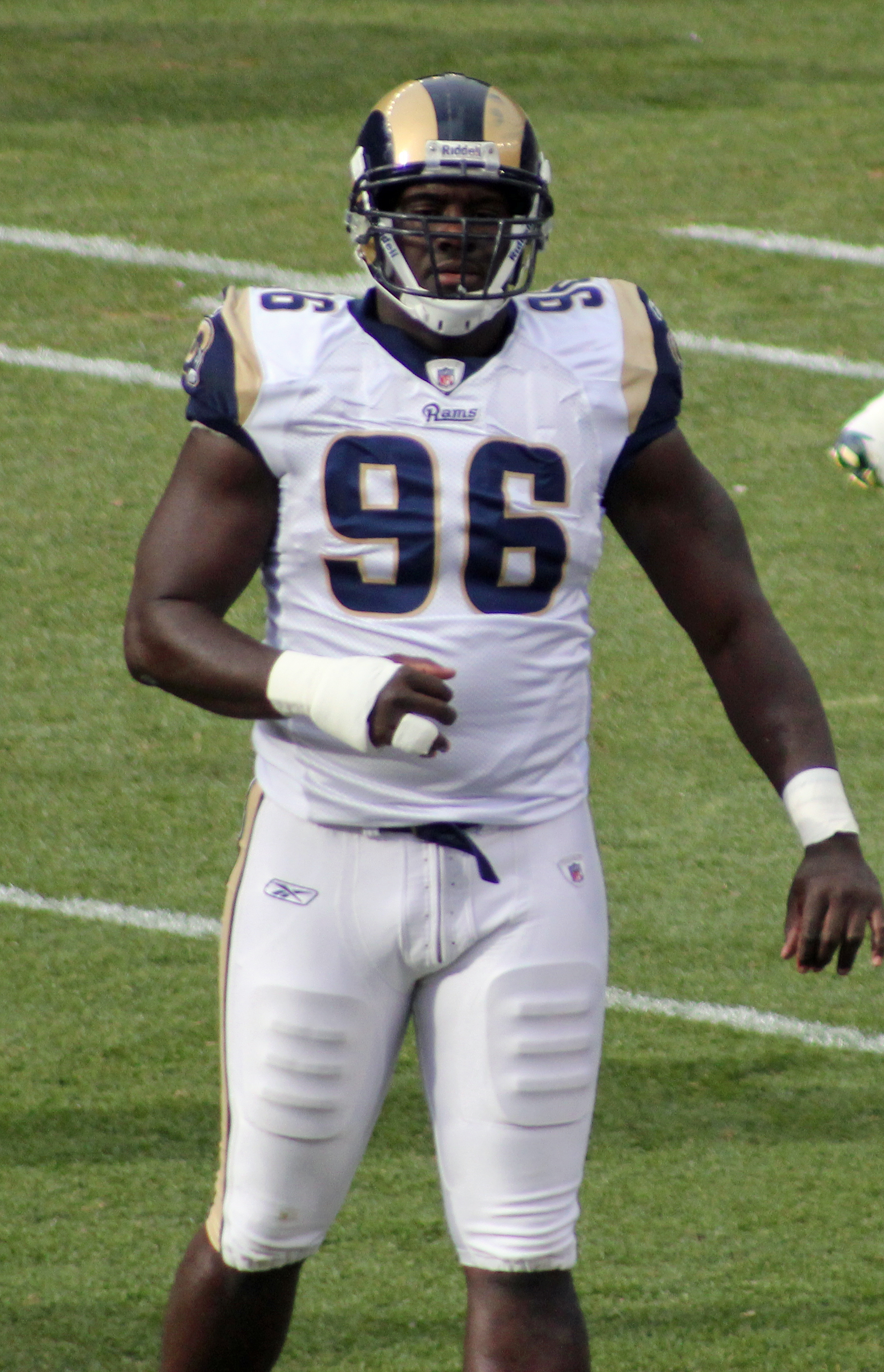
- Hall with the St. Louis Rams in 2010

No. 63, 96
- Position: Defensive end

Personal information
- Born: February 4, 1977 (age 49); New Orleans, Louisiana, U.S.
- Listed height: 6 ft 2 in (1.88 m)
- Listed weight: 281 lb (127 kg)

Career information
- High school: St. Augustine (New Orleans)
- College: Michigan (1995–1999)
- NFL draft: 2000: undrafted

Career history
- Detroit Lions (2000–2006); St. Louis Rams (2007–2011)

Awards and highlights
- AP national champion (1997); Third-team All-American (1999); Second-team All-Big Ten (1998)

Career NFL statistics
- Total tackles: 532
- Sacks: 63
- Forced fumbles: 15
- Fumble recoveries: 6
- Interceptions: 1
- Defensive touchdowns: 2
- Stats at Pro Football Reference

James Bradford Hall (born February 4, 1977) is an American former professional football player who was a defensive end in the National Football League (NFL) with the Detroit Lions from 2000 to 2006 and St. Louis Rams from 2007 to 2011. Hall signed with the Lions as an undrafted free agent in 2000. He played college football for the Michigan Wolverines, starting for three years and playing on their national championship 1997 team.

== Early life ==
Hall earned All-State honors as senior at St. Augustine High School in New Orleans. after totaling 67 tackles, eight sacks, and one interception as senior.

== College career ==
At the University of Michigan, Hall majored in sports marketing and administration and was a three-year starting defensive end for the Michigan Wolverines. Hall had 185 tackles and 25 sacks in his career. Coming off the bench for 11 games, Hall had 17 tackles and three sacks as a redshirt freshman in 1996. Then in 1997, when Michigan won the AP National Championship Trophy, Hall started 11 out of 12 games played at rush linebacker, with 51 tackles and four sacks. As a junior in 1998, Hall was named to the All-Big Ten Conference second-team with career-highs in tackles (63) and sacks (11). In his senior season of 1999, he was a third-team The Sporting News All-American, All-Big Ten honorable mention, and Butkus Award semifinalist after making 54 tackles and seven sacks.

== Professional career ==
=== Pre-draft ===
Pre-draft measurables
Height	Weight	40-yard dash	10-yard split	20-yard split	20-yard shuttle	Three-cone drill	Vertical jump	Broad jump
6 ft 2 1/8 in (1.88 m)	271 lb (123 kg)	5.01 s	1.73 s	2.85 s	4.51 s	7.86 s	32 in (0.81 m)	9 ft 3 in (2.82 m)
All values from NFL Combine.

=== Detroit Lions ===
He went undrafted in the 2000 NFL draft, signing a three-year with the Detroit Lions as an undrafted free agent on April 28, 2000.

==== 2000 season: Rookie season and limited playing time ====
Hall would play his first game of the season in the Week 11 matchup against the Atlanta Falcons, but wouldn't record a statistic. In the next week against the New York Giants, he would record his first statistics, sacking quarterback Kerry Collins and recording 3 tackles. He would play in the last three games of the season, but wouldn't record any statistics, ending his season with one sack.

==== 2001 season: Quality playing time ====
Hall would get more playing time in 2001, playing in 15 of the teams' 16 games. In the first six games of the season, Hall would record ½ sack and 13 tackles including four tackles-for-loss. In the latter half of the season, Hall would improve in play. In the Week 8 matchup against the San Francisco 49ers, he would record his first fumble recovery. During the Thanksgiving Day game against the Green Bay Packers, Hall picked up a fumble and returned it 8 yards for his first career touchdown. His best game of the season would come in the Week 13 game against the Tampa Bay Buccaneers, where he recorded 3½ sacks, a career high, and 8 tackles including 4 tackles-for-loss. He ended the 2001 season with 4 sacks, 35 tackles including 8-tackles-for-loss, two fumble recoveries including one touchdown, and one pass defended.

==== 2002 season: First starts, improvement in play ====
In the Week 4 matchup against the New Orleans Saints, Hall scored his second career touchdown when he recovered a fumble and returned it 22 yards for the score; he also recorded a sack and three solo tackles. Hall finished the season with 2 sacks, 49 tackles including 7 tackles-for-loss, two fumble recoveries including one for the score, and three passes defended. His 49 tackles and 7 tackles-for-loss would be the most of any Detroit defensive lineman that season.

==== 2003 season: Re-signing with Detroit ====
On May 28, 2003, Hall re-signed with the Lions for one year as a restricted free agent. In the season opener against the Arizona Cardinals, Hall recovered a forced fumble and recovery in the 42–24 victory. During a five-week stretch from Week 4 to Week 8, Hall recorded 4 sacks and 22 tackles including six tackles-for-loss. He would finish the season with 4.5 sacks, 62 tackles including eight tackles-for-loss, and two fumble recoveries. His 62 tackles once again led Detroit's defensive lineman.

==== 2004 season: Re-signing to a long-term deal, career season ====
On March 3, 2004, the Lions re-signed Hall to a five-year deal. Lions' president and CEO Matt Millen said of Hall, "He is a guy who we think can be a strong contributor for us."

=== St. Louis Rams ===
On March 2, 2007, the Detroit Lions traded James Hall to the St. Louis Rams for a conditional draft selection. After two seasons, he was released but later re-signed by the Rams. Hall would go on to start for rest of his tenure in St.Louis and was fairly productive with Chris Long on the other side. He went on to have 250 combined tackles and 30 sacks in five seasons in St. Louis. He was cut on March 12, 2012.

== NFL career statistics ==
Legend
	Led the league
**Bold**	Career high

Year	Team	Games		Tackles					Interceptions					Fumbles			
Year	Team	GP	GS	Cmb	Solo	Ast	Sck	TFL	Int	Yds	TD	Lng	PD	FF	FR	Yds	TD
2000	DET	5	0	3	2	1	1.0	0	0	0	0	0	1	1	0	0	0
2001	DET	15	0	35	26	9	4.0	8	0	0	0	0	1	0	**2**	8	**1**
2002	DET	**16**	14	49	34	**15**	2.0	7	0	0	0	0	3	0	**2**	**22**	**1**
2003	DET	**16**	**16**	**62**	48	14	4.5	8	0	0	0	0	0	1	1	0	0
2004	DET	**16**	**16**	48	38	10	**11.5**	**10**	**1**	**30**	0	**30**	**5**	4	1	0	0
2005	DET	14	14	60	**52**	8	5.0	8	0	0	0	0	1	3	0	0	0
2006	DET	7	7	25	17	8	5.0	3	0	0	0	0	0	1	0	0	0
2007	STL	15	15	59	44	**15**	2.5	7	0	0	0	0	1	0	0	0	0
2008	STL	**16**	2	44	37	7	6.5	**10**	0	0	0	0	0	0	0	0	0
2009	STL	14	14	42	39	3	4.5	6	0	0	0	0	1	0	0	0	0
2010	STL	**16**	**16**	55	49	6	10.5	8	0	0	0	0	2	**5**	0	0	0
2011	STL	15	15	50	38	12	6.0	9	0	0	0	0	2	0	0	0	0
		165	129	532	424	108	63.0	84	1	30	0	30	17	15	6	30	2
