= 1997 Michigan Wolverines football team =

American college football season

1997 Michigan Wolverines football

AP poll national champion NFF national champion FWAA national champion Big Ten champion Rose Bowl champion

Rose Bowl, W 21–16 vs. Washington State
- Conference: Big Ten Conference

Ranking
- Coaches: No. 2
- AP: No. 1
- Record: 12–0 (8–0 Big Ten)
- Head coach: Lloyd Carr (3rd season)
- Offensive coordinator: Mike DeBord (1st season)
- Defensive coordinator: Jim Herrmann (1st season)
- MVP: Charles Woodson
- Captains: Jon Jansen; Eric Mayes
- Home stadium: Michigan Stadium

1997 Big Ten Conference football standings
	Conf.			Overall
Team	W		L	W		L
No. 1 Michigan $	8	–	0	12	–	0
No. 12 Ohio State	6	–	2	10	–	3
No. 16 Penn State	6	–	2	9	–	3
No. 15 Purdue	6	–	2	9	–	3
Wisconsin	5	–	3	8	–	5
Iowa	4	–	4	7	–	5
Michigan State	4	–	4	7	–	5
Northwestern	3	–	5	5	–	7
Minnesota	1	–	7	3	–	9
Indiana	1	–	7	2	–	9
Illinois	0	–	8	0	–	11
$ – Conference champion; Rankings from AP Poll

The 1997 Michigan Wolverines football team represented the University of Michigan in the 1997 Big Ten Conference football season. In its third year under head coach Lloyd Carr, Michigan compiled a perfect 12–0 record, won the Big Ten Conference championship, and defeated Washington State in the 1998 Rose Bowl. Michigan was declared the national champion by the Associated Press, the National Football Foundation, and the Football Writers Association of America. The Wolverines finished second to the Nebraska Cornhuskers in the Coaches Poll resulting in a non-consensus national championship.

Michigan's defense was led by cornerback and Heisman Trophy-winner Charles Woodson. Woodson, who intercepted eight passes and also scored touchdowns via pass receptions, runs from scrimmage and punt return, became the first primarily defensive player to win the Heisman. Woodson and defensive end Glen Steele were both first-team selections on the 1997 College Football All-America Team. Other standouts on defense included linebackers James Hall with 8.5 quarterback sacks, Sam Sword with 91 tackles, and Dhani Jones with 90 tackles and six sacks. The defense allowed no fourth quarter points or second half touchdowns in the first eight games of the season. The unit's performance across all games in total defense (222.8 yards per game) and scoring defense (9.5 points per game) are the lowest marks by any Big Ten Conference football team since the 1985 season.

On offense, the 1997 Michigan team had neither a 1000-yard rusher nor a 500-yard receiver. Tai Streets was the leading receiver with 476 receiving yards, and Chris Howard led the team in rushing with 938 rushing yards. Quarterback Brian Griese set Michigan single-season records with 193 pass completions and 307 pass attempts. Tight end Jerame Tuman, who was the only player on the offensive unit selected as a first-team All-American, totaled 437 receiving yards and five touchdowns. Future National Football League (NFL) star Tom Brady was also on the roster, but did not start any games.

Ten members of the team were honored as All-Big Ten Conference selections, and running back Anthony Thomas was named the Big Ten Freshman of the Year. Thirty-one members of the 1997 Wolverines football team went on to play in the NFL. Prior to 1997, the Wolverines had compiled four consecutive four-loss seasons and had not won a national championship since the 1948 Michigan team. This was the most recent national championship for Michigan until the 2023 season.

== Schedule ==
Date	Time	Opponent	Rank	Site	TV	Result	Attendance
September 13	12:00 p.m.	No. 8 Colorado*	No. 14	Michigan Stadium; Ann Arbor, MI (College GameDay)	ABC	W 27–3	106,474
September 20	12:30 p.m.	Baylor*	No. 8	Michigan Stadium; Ann Arbor, MI	ESPN	W 38–3	106,041
September 27	3:30 p.m.	Notre Dame*	No. 6	Michigan Stadium; Ann Arbor, MI (rivalry)	ABC	W 21–14	106,508
October 4	12:00 p.m.	at Indiana	No. 6	Memorial Stadium; Bloomington, IN	ESPN Plus	W 37–0	42,240
October 11	12:30 p.m.	Northwestern	No. 6	Michigan Stadium; Ann Arbor, MI (rivalry)	ESPN	W 23–6	106,048
October 18	12:30 p.m.	No. 15 Iowa	No. 5	Michigan Stadium; Ann Arbor, MI	ESPN	W 28–24	106,505
October 25	12:30 p.m.	at No. 15 Michigan State	No. 5	Spartan Stadium; East Lansing, MI (rivalry, College GameDay)	ESPN	W 23–7	79,687
November 1	12:00 p.m.	Minnesota^{†}	No. 4	Michigan Stadium; Ann Arbor, MI (Little Brown Jug)	ESPN Plus	W 24–3	106,577
November 8	3:30 p.m.	at No. 2 Penn State	No. 4	Beaver Stadium; University Park, PA (rivalry)	ABC	W 34–8	97,498
November 15	3:30 p.m.	at No. 23 Wisconsin	No. 1	Camp Randall Stadium; Madison, WI	ABC	W 26–16	79,806
November 22	12:00 p.m.	No. 4 Ohio State	No. 1	Michigan Stadium; Ann Arbor, MI (The Game)	ABC	W 20–14	106,982
January 1, 1998	5:00 p.m.	vs. No. 8 Washington State*	No. 1	Rose Bowl; Pasadena, CA (Rose Bowl, College GameDay)	ABC	W 21–16	101,219
*Non-conference game; ^{†}Homecoming; Rankings from AP Poll released prior to the game; All times are in Eastern time

== Rankings ==
Ranking movements Legend: ██ Increase in ranking ██ Decrease in ranking ( ) = First-place votes
	Week																	
Poll	Pre	1	2	3	4	5	6	7	8	9	10	11	12	13	14	15	16	Final
AP	14	15	14	14	8	6	6	6	5	5	4	4 (1)	1 (44)	1 (44)	1 (69)	1 (69)	1 (69)	1 (51½)
Coaches	13		14	13	9	6	6	6	5	5 (1)	4 (2)	4 (2)	2 (20)	2 (20)	1 (46)	1 (58)	1 (53½)	2 (30)

== Preseason ==
Preseason ranking Going into the 1997 season, the Wolverines were ranked No. 17 in the pre-season Coaches' Poll and had experienced four consecutive four-loss seasons for the first time since the 1934–1937 Michigan Wolverines football teams. Michigan had not won a national championship in nearly 50 years and had not played in a Rose Bowl Game since the 1992 season. The 1997 Michigan team was the first since the 1969 team to have no Rose Bowl veterans. In early September 1997, The Columbus Dispatch wrote off Michigan, noting that "the longtime beast of the Big Ten ... has lost much of its aura" and predicting that Michigan's 1997 schedule "doesn't create a feeling that the pendulum is about to swing back."

Quarterback competition The months before the 1997 season opener featured uncertainty over the quarterback position. Junior Scott Dreisbach had started 11 games for the 1996 team, but fifth-year senior Brian Griese had relieved Driesbach in the Ohio State game after Driesbach was injured and helped the team recover from a 9–0 deficit. Dreisbach and Griese also faced competition from sophomore and future Super Bowl MVP, Tom Brady. Shortly before the season opener, head coach Lloyd Carr announced his selection of Griese as the starting quarterback.

Receiving corps Despite uncertainty at quarterback, Michigan entered the 1997 season with a solid group of receivers, including Tai Streets and Russell Shaw, as well as returning All-Big Ten tight end Jerame Tuman. Analysts believed that a solid season by any of the Michigan quarterbacks could lead to a productive season in the passing game. Moreover, it was anticipated that Charles Woodson, who was regarded as one of the most versatile athletes in college football, would play on offense.

Offensive line The offensive line was another uncertainty for the 1997 team. Three linemen from the 1996 team had been selected in the 1997 NFL draft: center Rod Payne (3rd round, 76th overall), offensive guard Damon Denson (4th round, 97th overall) and defensive tackle William Carr (7th round, 217th overall). As a result, Michigan began the season with only one offensive lineman, offensive tackle Jon Jansen, who had started a game. Jansen, a junior, had 25 consecutive starts entering the season. The offensive line was further weakened when left tackle, Jeff Backus, suffered a ruptured appendix. In spring practice, offensive line coach Terry Malone made a plea for help during a staff meeting, searching for talent to fill in on the line. To fill the holes on the offensive line, two defensive linemen, Steve Hutchinson and Chris Ziemann were moved to the offensive line.

Strength of schedule Adding to the challenges facing the 1997 team, Michigan entered the season with the toughest schedule among the 112 NCAA Division I-A schools based on records from the previous year. Days before the season opener, Lloyd Carr compared the daunting schedule to an expedition to Mount Everest. Carr noted, "It's a little akin to climbing Mount Everest. But Mount Everest has been climbed. And with great preparation and determination, and great attitude, which I think our players have, I can assure you we're looking forward to it."

== Game summaries ==
=== Week 1: Colorado ===
Week 1: (7) Colorado at (13) Michigan

Team	1	2	3	4	Total
Colorado (1–1)	0	0	3	0	3
• Michigan (1–0)	7	3	14	3	27

- Date: Saturday, September 13, 1997
- Location: Michigan Stadium
  Ann Arbor, MI
- Game attendance: 106,474
- TV announcers (ABC): Keith Jackson and Bob Griese

Scoring summary
1		MICH	Chris Floyd 1-yard run (Kraig Baker kick)	MICH 7–0
2	0:00	MICH	Kraig Baker 37-yard field goal	MICH 10–0
3	10:26	MICH	Chris Howard 5-yard pass from Brian Griese (Kraig Baker kick)	MICH 17–0
3		MICH	Russell Shaw 6-yard pass from Brian Griese (Kraig Baker kick)	MICH 24–0
3		COL	Jason Lesley 52-yard field goal	MICH 24–3
4		MICH	Kraig Baker 19-yard field goal	MICH 27–3

Michigan opened the 1997 season with a home game against Colorado. Three years earlier, Colorado had defeated Michigan in a game nicknamed "The Miracle at Michigan" on Kordell Stewart's 64-yard Hail Mary pass to Michael Westbrook as time ran out.

Michigan won the 1997 game 27 to 3, a margin that eliminated the possibility of another last-minute miracle. Griese completed 21 of 28 forward pass attempts for 258 yards and two touchdowns. Tight end Jerame Tuman had five receptions for 126 yards. Defensively, Michigan intercepted four passes thrown by Colorado's John Hessler, while holding him to 141 yards on 15 of 39 passing.

Throughout the game, Michigan relied on man coverage from cornerbacks Woodson and Andre Weathers, blitzes and pressure from the four-man defensive line. Colorado only threw against Woodson five times, and one of those passes was intercepted by Woodson at Michigan's 45-yard-line. Griese and Tuman connected for 53 yards on the very next play. Two plays later Chris Floyd executed a one-yard dive for the first points of the day. Late in the second quarter, Griese completed a 29-yard pass to Woodson, and Kraig Baker kicked a field goal on the final play of the first half to give Michigan a 10–0 lead at halftime.

Michigan opened the second half with an 89-yard, 11-play drive that included a 20-yard pass from Griese to Tuman followed by a roughing the passer penalty. The drive ended in a five-yard touchdown pass from Griese to Chris Howard. In the third quarter, Michigan scored 14 points in a span of one minute and 44 seconds; the second touchdown followed a Clint Copenhaver interception that was returned to the Buffaloes' 14-yard line. The touchdown was scored on a 6-yard pass from Griese to Shaw. Baker closed out the scoring with a 19-yard field goal in the fourth quarter.

The loss was Colorado's worst defeat under head coach Rick Neuheisel, its lowest point total in 101 games, and fewest yards of total offense (224) in five years. It was Michigan's fifth consecutive season-opening win and fifth straight win against a top 10 team in the Associated Press poll.

=== Week 2: Baylor ===
Week 2: Baylor at (9) Michigan

Team	1	2	3	4	Total
Baylor (1–2)	3	0	0	0	3
• Michigan (2–0)	7	14	7	10	38

- Date: Saturday, September 20, 1997
- Location: Michigan Stadium
  Ann Arbor, MI
- Game attendance: 106,041

Scoring summary
1	8:05	BAY	Matt Bryant 30-yard field goal	BAY 3–0
1	5:39	MICH	Charles Woodson 10-yard pass from Brian Griese (Kraig Baker kick)	MICH 7–3
2	11:30	MICH	Chris Howard 5-yard run (Kraig Baker kick)	MICH 14–3
2	2:03	MICH	Chris Howard 1-yard run (Kraig Baker kick)	MICH 21–3
3	6:57	MICH	Anthony Thomas 2-yard run (Kraig Baker kick)	MICH 28–3
4	11:53	MICH	Jay Feely 51-yard field goal	MICH 31–3
4	2:57	MICH	Tate Schanski 1-yard run (Kraig Baker kick)	MICH 38–3

In the second week of the season, Michigan defeated Baylor 38–3 at Michigan Stadium. Baylor scored first after running back Chris Howard fumbled on Michigan's 29-yard-line. The Bears had a touchdown called back due to an offensive holding penalty, but kicked a 30-yard field goal. Michigan took the lead with 5:39 remaining in the first quarter on a 10-yard wide receiver screen play from Griese to Woodson. Chris Howard added two touchdowns in the second quarter to give Michigan a 21–3 lead at halftime. Howard's second touchdown capped a 14-play, 92-yard drive that consumed four-and-a-half minutes.

True freshman Anthony Thomas scored on a two-yard run in the third quarter to complete Michigan's second 92-yard drive of the day. In the fourth quarter, Woodson had a 34-yard touchdown catch called back due to a false start penalty, but Jay Feely kicked a 51-yard field goal. Tate Schanski scored Michigan's final touchdown on a one-yard run with 2:57 remaining in the game.

Michigan outgained Baylor 532–154 in total offense. The Wolverines totaled 344 rushing yards, including 112 yards by Howard and 122 yards by Thomas. Clarence Williams added 129 yards of total offense, including 77 yards rushing. Griese completed 13 of 22 passes for 169 yards and no interceptions, and Woodson had two receptions for 45 yards.

On defense, the Wolverines held Baylor to 32 yards in the second half, allowing three plays on its first four possessions of the second half. Woodson allowed no catches and made five unassisted tackles (three for a loss). He played 46 downs on defense, six on special teams and five on offense. The win improved Michigan to 16–6–2 against the Big 12 Conference and 9–0 in September under Carr.

=== Week 3: Notre Dame ===
Week 3: Notre Dame at (6) Michigan
(Michigan–Notre Dame rivalry game)

Team	1	2	3	4	Total
Notre Dame (1–2)	7	7	0	0	14
• Michigan (2–0)	0	7	14	0	21

- Date: Saturday, September 27, 1997
- Location: Michigan Stadium
  Ann Arbor, MI
- Game attendance: 106,508

Scoring summary
1	3:16	ND	Bobby Brown 15-yard pass from Ron Powlus (Jim Sanson kick)	ND 7–0
2	13:40	MICH	Clarence Williams 4-yard run (Kraig Baker kick)	Tied 7–7
2	0:18	ND	Tony Driver 2-yard run (Jim Sanson kick)	ND 14–7
3	14:36	MICH	Tai Streets 41-yard pass from Brian Griese (Kraig Baker kick)	Tied 14–14
3	9:21	MICH	Chris Floyd 14-yard run (Kraig Baker kick)	MICH 21–14

For the third game of the season, Michigan faced Notre Dame in the 27th match between college football's winningest programs. Michigan won the game 21–14 in front of a crowd of 106,508, the sixth largest in the history of Michigan Stadium at that time. Under first year coach Bob Davie, Notre Dame had lost consecutive games to Purdue and Michigan State, and entered Michigan Stadium unranked for the first time since the creation of the AP poll in 1936. Notre Dame ended the day with its first three-game losing streak in 12 years.

In the first quarter, Notre Dame scored first on a 15-yard touchdown pass from Ron Powlus to Bobby Brown, culminating a 12-play, 78-yard drive. In the second quarter, the Wolverines tied the game on a 4-yard touchdown run by Clarence Williams to complete an 11-play, 68-yard drive. Notre Dame regained the lead late in the second quarter on a 98-yard drive ending in a two-yard run by Tony Driver with 18 seconds left in the half.

Within the first 24 seconds of the second half, Griese and Streets connected on back-to-back passes of 15 and 41 yards to tie the game at 14. Michigan scored again just over five minutes later on a 14-yard run by Floyd. Michigan's defense overcame three fourth-quarter turnovers and held Notre Dame scoreless in the second half to preserve the 21–14 lead. After Aaron Shea lost a fumble at the Michigan 47-yard line, cornerback Tommy Hendricks made a diving interception in the end zone with 10:34 remaining in the game. When Notre Dame recovered a loose ball two minutes later at the Wolverines 42-yard line, Michigan's defense forced a punt after a three-and-out. The Wolverines suffered a third turnover late in the fourth quarter when Griese and Chris Howard botched a handoff that Notre Dame recovered at the Michigan 28-yard line. Notre Dame drove to the 20-yard line, but Glen Steele and James Hall made a key stop on fourth down. Howard helped Michigan run out the final 3:26 with runs of 27, seven, nine and eight yards.

Notre Dame outgained Michigan in total offense by a margin of 354 yards to 345 yards. Notre Dame's offensive standouts were Powlus (177 passing yards) and Malcolm Johnson (106 receiving yards). However, Notre Dame was penalized 10 times for 92 yards, including six holding infractions, one of which nullified a pass interference penalty against Woodson. Michigan's offensive stars of the game were Griese (16-of-22 passing for 177 yards), Howard (91 rushing yards rushing on 16 carries) and Streets (3 receptions for 77 yards).

=== Week 4: Indiana ===
Week 4: (6) Michigan at Indiana

Team	1	2	3	4	Total
• Michigan (3–0, 0–0)	3	28	6	0	37
Indiana (1–3, 0–1)	0	0	0	0	0

- Date: Saturday, October 4, 1997
- Location: Memorial Stadium
  Bloomington, IN
- Game attendance: 42,240

Scoring summary
1	7:04	MICH	Kraig Baker 27-yard field goal	MICH 3–0
2	14:31	MICH	Chris Howard 3-yard run (Kraig Baker kick)	MICH 10–0
2	7:53	MICH	Tai Streets 18-yard pass from Brian Griese (Kraig Baker)	MICH 17–0
2	4:55	MICH	Anthony Thomas 14-yard run (Kraig Baker kick)	MICH 24–0
2	1:59	MICH	Patrick McCall 3-yard run (Kraig Baker kick)	MICH 31–0
3	9:31	MICH	Kraig Baker 35-yard field goal	MICH 34–0
3	1:26	MICH	Kraig Baker 40-yard field goal	MICH 37–0

In its fourth game of the season, Michigan defeated the Indiana Hoosiers 37 to 0. Michigan posted four second-quarter touchdowns, and Indiana only got close to the Michigan end zone once in the first quarter. The win was the eighth consecutive and 23rd of 24 for Michigan over Indiana. It was Michigan's first shutout since November 11, 1995, against Purdue. The game pitted Michigan against former Michigan assistant coach and first year head coach Cam Cameron.

Brian Griese passed for 204 yards and a touchdown, before giving way to Tom Brady after one series in the third quarter. Baker kicked three field goals and four extra points. Howard led Michigan receivers with 65 yards on 7 catches, and Anthony Thomas led the rushers with 65 yards on 14 carries. Charles Woodson had a 21-yard reception. The Michigan defense held Indiana to negative 2 return yards and 16 rushing yards on 27 carries.

In the first quarter, Baker's 27-yard field goal was the only scoring. Twenty-nine seconds into the second quarter, Howard's three-yard run gave Michigan a 10–0 lead. Later in the quarter, Michigan scored three touchdowns in a 5:54 span. First, Griese connected with Streets for 18 yards. Thomas and Patrick McCall added 14-yard and three-yard scoring runs to give Michigan a 31–0 lead with 1:59 remaining in the first half. Baker added 35-yard and 40-yard field goals in the third quarter to complete the scoring.

=== Week 5: Northwestern ===
Week 5: Northwestern at (6) Michigan

Team	1	2	3	4	Total
Northwestern (2–4, 0–2)	3	0	3	0	6
• Michigan (4–0, 1–0)	0	13	0	10	23

- Date: Saturday, October 11, 1997
- Location: Michigan Stadium
  Ann Arbor, MI
- Game attendance: 106,048

Scoring summary
1	6:21	NW	Brian Gowins 52-yard field goal	NW 3–0
2	13:25	MICH	Kraig Baker 19-yard field goal	Tied 3–3
2	10:02	MICH	Kraig Baker 23-yard field goal	MICH 6–3
2	1:02	MICH	Jerame Tuman 10-yard pass from Brian Griese (Kraig Baker kick)	MICH 13–3
3	11:03	NW	Brian Gowins 42-yard field goal	MICH 13–6
4	9:29	MICH	Jerame Tuman 2-yard pass from Brian Griese (Kraig Baker kick)	MICH 20–6
4	7:28	MICH	Kraig Baker 26-yard field goal	MICH 23–6

Michigan defeated Northwestern 23–6 in the fifth game of the season. While the Wolverines entered the game with a 44–13–2 record against the Wildcats, Northwestern had won the previous two meetings.

Northwestern placekicker Brian Gowins kicked a career-best 52-yard field goal to put Northwestern ahead 3–0 in the first quarter. Michigan took the lead with 13 points in the second quarter, starting with 19-yard and 23-yard field goals by Baker. With 1:02 left in the half, Griese threw a 10-yard touchdown pass to Tuman. Gowin kicked a second field goal early in the third quarter, but missed a 47-yarder at the end of the quarter. Early in the fourth quarter, Michigan sustained a 70-yard scoring drive that consumed five-and-a-half minutes on the game clock. During the drive, Griese completed 5-of-6 passes for 51 yards, including a 22-yard pass to Streets, a 16-yard pass to Williams and a 2-yard touchdown pass to Tuman. When Northwestern got the ball back, Woodson intercepted a Tim Hughes pass and returned it two yards to the Northwestern 30. Michigan added a 26-yard field goal by Baker with 7:28 remaining to complete the scoring.

Michigan's leaders on offense were Griese (23-of-36 passing for 244 yards and 2 touchdowns), Howard (90 rushing yards on 18 carries), Tuman (5 receptions for 79 yards and 2 touchdowns) and Baker (3 field goals). On defense, the Wolverines held an opponent without a touchdown for the fourth time in five games, as Brian Gowins' two field goals provided Northwestern's only points. The defense remained perfect in the fourth quarter, giving up no fourth quarter points through the first five games. Michigan's had a 385–170 yard advantage as Division I-A's stingiest defense made one interception and one fumble recovery. The loss was the fourth in a row for Northwestern.

=== Week 6: Iowa ===
Week 6: (15) Iowa at (5) Michigan

Team	1	2	3	4	Total
Iowa (4–1, 2–0)	0	21	3	0	24
• Michigan (5–0, 2–0)	0	7	14	7	28

- Date: Saturday, October 18, 1997
- Location: Michigan Stadium
  Ann Arbor, MI
- Game attendance: 106,505

Scoring summary
2	13:29	IOWA	Tavian Banks 53-yard run (Zach Bromert kick)	IOWA 7–0
2	4:53	MICH	Tai Streets 15-yard pass from Brian Griese (Kraig Baker kick)	Tied 7–7
2	2:27	IOWA	Michael Burger 1-yard run (kick failed)	IOWA 13–7
2	0:00	IOWA	Tim Dwight 61-yard punt return (Matt Sherman to Chris Knipper pass)	IOWA 21–7
3	11:06	MICH	Russell Shaw 10-yard pass from Brian Griese (Kraig Baker kick)	IOWA 21–14
3	3:19	MICH	Brian Griese 1-yard run (Kraig Baker kick)	Tied 21–21
3	0:25	IOWA	Zach Bromert 38-yard field goal	IOWA 24–21
4	2:55	MICH	Jerame Tuman 2-yard pass from Brian Griese (Kraig Baker kick)	MICH 28–24

Michigan had its closest contest of the year in week six, as Iowa scored 21 points in the second quarter to take a 21–7 halftime lead. The Wolverines responded by outscoring the Hawkeyes 21–3 in the second half to win the game by a final score of 28–24.

Iowa running back Tavian Banks opened the scoring 91 seconds into the second quarter with a 53-yard touchdown run. Michigan responded by tying the game on a 15-yard touchdown pass from Griese to Streets with 4:53 remaining in the half. On Michigan's next drive, Iowa cornerback Ed Gibson intercepted Griese and returned the ball 64 yards to the Michigan 1-yard line. From there, Michael Burger put Iowa ahead with a touchdown run with 2:27 remaining. On the final play of the first half, Iowa's All-American Tim "White Lightning" Dwight returned a punt 61 yards for a touchdown, giving Iowa a 14-point lead at halftime.

Michigan scored two touchdowns in the third quarter, tying the score with 3:11 remaining in the quarter on a quarterback sneak by Griese on 4th-and-goal from the one-yard line. Iowa retook the lead on a field goal after a 72-yard kick return by Dwight. Late in the fourth quarter, Iowa continued to hold a 24–21 lead, but Griese and Tuman connected on a two-yard touchdown pass with 2:55 remaining in the game. Iowa responded by driving to Michigan's 15-yard line, but Sam Sword intercepted Matt Sherman with 31 seconds left to secure the victory.

Iowa's scoring was fueled by four plays resulting in gains of more than 50 yards. Banks also rushed for 99 yards on 19 carries. Michigan's offense was fueled by the passing of Griese (15 of 26 for 165 yards) and the rushing of Thomas (129 yards on 20 carries) and Howard (81 yards on 13 first-half carries). On defense, Michigan maintained its season-long fourth quarter shutout and had allowed only nine points (on three field goals) in the third quarter through the first six games. Both defenses also came through with big plays, including a total of six interceptions, three each on Griese and Sherman.

=== Week 7: Michigan State ===
Week 7: (5) Michigan at (14) Michigan State
(Paul Bunyan Trophy game)

Team	1	2	3	4	Total
• Michigan (6–0, 3–0)	3	7	3	10	23
Michigan State (5–1, 2–1)	7	0	0	0	7

- Date: Saturday, October 25, 1997
- Location: Spartan Stadium
  East Lansing, MI
- Game start: 12:30 pm EDT
- Game attendance: 79,687

Scoring summary
1	8:24	MICH	Kraig Baker 30-yard field goal	MICH 3–0
1	3:39	MSU	Sedrick Irvin 22-yard pass from Bill Burke (Chris Gardner kick)	MSU 7–3
2	0:47	MICH	Brian Griese 1-yard run (Kraig Baker kick)	MICH 10–7
3	5:58	MICH	Kraig Baker 30-yard field goal	MICH 13–7
4	12:26	MICH	Chris Howard 2-yard run (Kraig Baker kick)	MICH 20–7
4	7:40	MICH	Kraig Baker 27-yard field goal	MICH 23–7

This was the 90th meeting of the rival schools that have fought for the Paul Bunyan Trophy annually since 1953. Michigan State's 5–1 start was its best since the 1966 team. On the strength of zero fourth quarter points and only 9 second half points, Michigan entered the game tied for first nationally in average points allowed (8.3) and in second in both yards of total offense allowed (207.7) and defensive pass efficiency. Michigan State entered the game with a 34 points per game average, which was the schools best since the 1978 team. Although Michigan held a 58–26–5 series edge, the home team had won each of the last five meetings and Michigan State had won 7 consecutive home games. Sophomore linebacker Dhani Jones had led Michigan in tackles in each of the three previous games and was second on the defense in tackles for the season.

Woodson and Marcus Ray each snared two interceptions and the team tied a school record with six. The interceptions brought Woodson's career total to 15, which was second in school history. Baker had three field goals (the third time in four weeks). Michigan again shut down its opponent in the second half, holding Michigan State to 43 yards in the first 28:18 until the final drive in "garbage time" with substitutes on the field. The game was only the second time Michigan State had surrendered 6 interceptions (the first since the 1958 team). The Spartans could not score on the Michigan defense and were only able to produce a touchdown with a fake field goal on special teams. Although sophomore Sedrick Irvin had produced 141 yards in the first half (66 rushing and 75 receiving), he was held to 15 yards in six carries and two yards on three receptions in the second half.

Michigan State scored on a 22-yard pass from Bill Burke to Irvin from a field goal formation. The most important play early in the game was Griese's one-yard run with 47 seconds remaining in the first half to cap an 11-play 95-yard drive to erase the Spartans' 7–3 lead. On the drive, which started after an illegal block on a punt return put Michigan deep in its own field, Howard made a 10-yard run followed by a 51-yard run for a large part of his total of 110 yards. With 2:12 remaining in the third quarter and Michigan holding a 13–7 lead, Woodson made a leaping, one-handed interception, with his left foot landing just inside the sideline. His second interception, on the next Spartan possession, led to a touchdown by Chris Howard that established Michigan's firm control of the game. Woodson was thrown against more than any time since the opener against Colorado. Despite being stifled in the second half, the Spartans remained within six points at the start of the fourth quarter.

=== Week 8: Minnesota ===
Week 8: Minnesota at (5) Michigan
(Battle for the Little Brown Jug)
(Homecoming game)

Team	1	2	3	4	Total
Minnesota (2–6, 0–4)	3	0	0	0	3
• Michigan (7–0, 4–0)	0	14	7	3	24

- Date: Saturday, November 1, 1997
- Location: Michigan Stadium
  Ann Arbor, MI
- Game attendance: 106,577

Scoring summary
1	10:49	MINN	Adam Bailey 27-yard field goal	MINN 3–0
2	14:51	MICH	Charles Woodson 33-yard run (Kraig Baker kick)	MICH 7–3
2	7:58	MICH	Mark Campbell 12-yard pass from Brian Griese (Kraig Baker kick)	MICH 14–3
3	7:49	MICH	Anthony Thomas 29-yard run (Kraig Baker kick)	MICH 21–3
4	4:25	MICH	Kraig Baker 31-yard field goal	MICH 24–3

During week 8, Michigan faced Minnesota in the annual battle for the Little Brown Jug. Although Michigan had won ten straight against Minnesota, the Golden Gophers had previously ruined a perfect season for a 9–0 1986 Michigan team. Michigan entered the game ranked first nationally in both scoring defense (8.1 points per game) and pass efficiency defense (79.62 rating).

Minnesota drove 71 yards on its first possession, scored the game's first points on a 27-yard field goal by Adam Bailey and led 3–0 after one quarter. After the opening drive, Michigan's defense shut down the Golden Gophers, allowing only 33 yards of total offense in the remainder of the game. Minnesota was held to 10 yards of total offense in the entire second half, as Michigan extended its fourth-quarter shutout to 8 games. Michigan also held its opponent without a touchdown for the fifth time in 8 games and shut down Minnesota so effectively that Michigan started four drives in Minnesota territory in the first half.

Woodson, who played 16 offensive plays, gave Michigan the lead 9 seconds into the second quarter on a 33-yard touchdown run off a reverse play. Michigan scored its second touchdown on a drive starting at Minnesota's 33-yard line following a short punt. Griese connected with Thomas for 28 yards and then with Mark Campbell for a 12-yard touchdown to give Michigan a 14–3 halftime lead. In the third quarter, Michigan mounted a 93-yard drive that ended with a 29-yard touchdown run by Thomas. Baker added a field goal in the final quarter.

Michigan's offensive leader in the game was Howard, who totaled 98 rushing yards on 20 carries and 40 receiving yards on a game-high four catches. Shea added 51 receiving yards on three catches. Minnesota totaled only 102 yards of total offense, and Byron Evans was responsible for 82 of them (17 carries for 82 yards). Michigan overcame two turnovers inside Minnesota's 5-yard-line and a missed field goal. With the win, Michigan had prevailed in 28 of its last 30 games against Minnesota.

=== Week 9: Penn State ===
Week 9: (4) Michigan at (3) Penn State

Team	1	2	3	4	Total
• Michigan (8–0, 5–0)	10	14	10	0	34
Penn State (7–0, 4–0)	0	0	0	8	8

- Date: Saturday, November 8, 1997
- Location: Beaver Stadium
  University Park, PA
- Game attendance: 97,498

Scoring summary
1	8:52	MICH	Kraig Baker 29-yard field goal	MICH 3–0
1	4:41	MICH	Anthony Thomas 12-yard run (Kraig Baker kick)	MICH 10–0
2	11:07	MICH	Charles Woodson 37-yard pass from Brian Griese (Kraig Baker kick)	MICH 17–0
2	6:10	MICH	Jerame Tuman 8-yard pass from Brian Griese (Kraig Baker kick)	MICH 24–0
3	6:52	MICH	Chris Howard 29-yard run (Kraig Baker kick)	MICH 31–0
3	1:03	MICH	Kraig Baker 42-yard field goal	MICH 34–0
4	6:12	PSU	Curtis Enis 1-yard run (Mike McQueary to Curtis Enis pass)	MICH 34–8

In week 9, Michigan defeated the Penn State Nittany Lions 34–8 in front of a record crowd of 97,498 at Beaver Stadium. Penn State entered the game with the longest active winning streak among major colleges at 12 games and was ranked No. 2 in the AP poll and No. 3 in the Coaches Poll. Michigan was 8–0 and ranked No. 4 in both polls. The game matched Michigan's defense, which was ranked first in Division I-A in scoring defense (7.5 points per game), yards per game (202.5) and pass efficiency rating (77.5), against Penn State's offense, which was ranked eighth in total offense (464 yards per game) and ninth in rushing offense (240 yards per game).

On the opening drive, Michigan drove 53 yards and took the lead on a 29-yard field goal by Kraig Baker. On Penn State's first play from scrimmage after the field goal, Glen Steele sacked Penn State quarterback Mike McQueary for a 10-yard loss. On third down, Juaquin Feazell sacked McQueary for a seven-yard loss, and Penn State was forced to punt after losing 13 yards on the drive. After the punt, Michigan drove 55 yards in six plays, ending with a 12-yard touchdown run by Anthony Thomas. In the second quarter, Michigan extended its lead to 17–0 after Griese gained 40 yards on a broken play and then completed a 37-yard touchdown pass to Woodson. Michigan's defense held Penn State to one yard on its next possession, and the offense then drove 57 yards on 11 plays, scoring on an eight-yard touchdown pass from Griese to Jerame Tuman. Michigan led 24–0 at the half, Penn State's largest halftime deficit in the Joe Paterno era.

In the third quarter, Chris Howard ran 29 yards for a touchdown, and Baker added a 42-yard field goal. At the end of the third quarter, Michigan led 34–0. Penn State scored its only points on a one-yard touchdown by Curtis Enis and two-point conversion with 6:12 left in the game. The 34–8 defeat was Penn State's worst home loss in the Paterno era. which began in 1966.

Michigan's defense held the Penn State to 169 yards of total offense (68 passing yards and 101 rushing yards), Penn State's lowest total since 1987. The defense also held Penn State without a single third down conversion in 12 attempts and totaled nine tackles for loss, including five quarterback sacks. Penn State did not get inside the Michigan 40-yard line in the first 52 minutes of the game. Woodson helped contain Penn State's leading receiver, Joe Jurevicius to 20 receiving yards. Enis accounted for the majority of Penn State's offense with 103 rushing yards on 18 carries for his fifth consecutive 100-yard game. Through the first nine games, Michigan's defense allowed an average of 198.7 yards per game, the lowest among major college teams since the national champion 1992 Alabama team gave up 194.2 yards per game. However, Penn State scored the first fourth-quarter points and the first second-half touchdown that Michigan had surrendered all season.

Michigan's offense totaled 416 yards and was led by Howard and Griese. Howard rushed for 120 yards on 22 carries and had four pass receptions for 41 yards. Griese completed 14 of 22 passes for 151 yards and added 46 rushing yards. Michigan was 7-for-15 in third down conversions and had an overall yardage edge 416–169. In the first half, Michigan had a 259–38 yards of total offense advantage and a 16–3 first downs edge without the benefit of any turnovers.

=== Week 10: Wisconsin ===
Week 10: (2) Michigan at (24) Wisconsin

Team	1	2	3	4	Total
• Michigan (9–0, 6–0)	7	9	0	10	26
Wisconsin (8–2, 5–1)	0	3	7	6	16

- Date: Saturday, November 15, 1997
- Location: Camp Randall Stadium
  Madison, WI
- Game attendance: 79,806

Scoring summary
1	9:06	MICH	Chris Howard 1-yard run (Kraig Baker kick)	MICH 7–0
2	12:07	MICH	Tai Streets 38-yard pass from Brian Griese (kick failed)	MICH 13–0
2	4:22	WIS	Matt Davenport 33-yard field goal	MICH 13–3
2	0:15	MICH	Jay Feely 18-yard field goal	MICH 16–3
3	9:52	WIS	Mike Samuel 1-yard run (Matt Davenport kick)	MICH 16–10
4	13:08	MICH	Jay Feely 24-yard field goal	MICH 19–10
4	6:15	MICH	Chris Howard 4-yard run (Jay Feely kick)	MICH 26–10
4	2:45	WIS	Tony Simmons 21-yard pass from Mike Samuel (two-point failed)	MICH 26–16

Following its convincing victory over Penn State, Michigan traveled to Wisconsin ranked No. 1 in the AP poll, though Florida State was No. 1 in the coaches' poll and Nebraska also remained unbeaten. The game drew the third-largest crowd ever (79,806) at Camp Randall Stadium.

Michigan took the opening drive 80 yards in 13 plays, ending with a one-yard touchdown run by Howard on fourth down. During the drive, Michigan showed some flashiness with a "double pass" play that had Griese throwing across the field to Woodson, and Woodson throwing back to Griese, who ran the ball 28 yards to the Badgers' one-yard-line to set up the first score. In the second quarter, Griese connected with Streets for a 38-yard touchdown, which gave Michigan a 13–0 lead after Baker missed the extra point. Wisconsin responded with a 62-yard, 14-play drive that ended with a 33-yard field goal by Matt Davenport with 4:22 remaining in the half. On its final possession of the half, Michigan drove to Wisconsin's one-yard-line, but this time on fourth down they opted for an 18-yard Feely field goal to take a 16–3 lead into halftime. Feely took over for Baker for the rest of the game after the missed extra point. Wisconsin put together an 80-yard, 11-play drive with Samuel sneaking in from the 1-yard line. Feely added a 24-yard field goal 1:52 into the fourth quarter. Then, Howard added a four-yard touchdown run with 6:15 remaining to make it 26–10. Wisconsin posted a 21-yard touchdown pass to Tony Simmons with 2:45 left, but missed the two-point conversion, leaving them 10 points behind, which was the final margin.

Despite the fact that Wisconsin was without Ron Dayne who had a sprained ankle, Michigan's performance was unimpressive compared to its undefeated peers who won by wide margins: Florida State defeated Wake Forest 58–7 and Nebraska defeated Iowa State 77–14. Also, week 11 opponent Ohio State, defeated Illinois 41–6. Florida State's win gave it its record-setting 11th straight 10-win season. The game marked the first time in its last four attempts that Michigan won a football game while ranked number one in the AP poll. Michigan had 204 rushing yards and 282 passing yards with no turnovers. Wisconsin totaled 235 yards.

Griese had one touchdown and 254 yards on 19 of 26 passing. Howard had 100 yards on 26 carries, including two touchdowns. Floyd added 66 yards on just six carries. Woodson picked off his nation-leading sixth interception, had three receptions for 28 yards as well as a 28-yard pass completion to Griese after what The New York Times (NYT) described as a double pass, but the USA Today (USAT) described as a handoff and pass. Streets had 108 yards on five receptions. Carl McCullough had 106 yards on 20 carries in Dayne's place. Wisconsin quarterback Mike Samuel also picked up some of the slack with 73 yards on 15 carries according to NYT, but only totaled 49 yards, according to USAT.

=== Week 11: Ohio State ===
Week 11: (4) Ohio State at (2) Michigan
(Michigan–Ohio State rivalry game)

Team	1	2	3	4	Total
Ohio State (10–1, 6–1)	0	0	7	7	14
• Michigan (10–0, 7–0)	0	13	7	0	20

- Date: Saturday, November 22, 1997
- Location: Michigan Stadium
  Ann Arbor, MI
- Game attendance: 106,982
- Game weather: Cloudy
- TV announcers (ABC): Keith Jackson and Bob Griese

Scoring summary
2	7:22	MICH	Anthony Thomas 1-yard run (Kraig Baker kick)	MICH 7–0
2	3:43	MICH	Charles Woodson 78-yard punt return (kick blocked)	MICH 13–0
3	10:29	MICH	Andre Weathers 43-yard interception return (Jay Feely kick)	MICH 20–0
3	4:50	OSU	David Boston 56-yard pass from Joe Germaine (Dan Stultz kick)	MICH 20–7
4	13:08	OSU	Pepe Pearson 2-yard run (Dan Stultz kick)	MICH 20–14

Michigan concluded the regular season with a 20–14 win in its annual rivalry game against Ohio State, securing the Wolverines' first perfect regular season since 1971. The game, which drew a record crowd of 106,982 to Michigan Stadium, began with a strong showing by both defensive units. The first 10 possessions ended with nine punts and a fumble by Ohio State quarterback, Stanley Jackson. Michigan took a 7–0 lead in the second quarter with a two-minute, 62-yard touchdown drive. The key plays on the drive were a 37-yard pass from Brian Griese to Charles Woodson and a 15-yard run by Chris Floyd taking the ball to the 1. Anthony Thomas slipped past middle linebacker Andy Katzenmoyer for the touchdown. Michigan's defense held Ohio State to three plays on the following drive, and Woodson returned Ohio State's punt 78 yards up the left sideline for Michigan's second touchdown with 3:43 remaining in the first half. Katzenmoyer blocked Kraig Baker's extra point attempt and ran the ball back to Michigan's 30-yard-line. Michigan led 13–0 at halftime.

Two Ohio State drives in the third quarter ended with interceptions. On the first, Ohio State drove to Michigan's 7 when Woodson intercepted a Stanley Jackson pass. The interception was Woodson's seventh of the season and Jackson's first. On Ohio State's next possession, Jackson passed the ball while in the grasp of Michigan's Sam Sword. Andre Weathers intercepted the pass and returned it 43 yards for a touchdown, giving Michigan a 20–0 lead. Later in the third quarter, Ohio State scored on a 56-yard touchdown pass from Joe Germaine to David Boston. Ohio State added a final touchdown in the fourth quarter after Gary Berry forced a fumble during a sack of Griese. Jerry Rudzinski recovered the ball at Michigan's seven-yard-line and returned it to the 2-yard line. Pepe Pearson, who had 80 yards on 17 carries, ran two yards for the score on the next play. Michigan held its 20–14 lead, as defensive end Glen Steele twice sacked Joe Germaine on the final possession and had another tackle for a loss. Ian Gold deflected Germaine's fourth-down pass from the Ohio State 16-yard line with 42 seconds left in the game.

Michigan's offense was forced to punt 11 times, compiled only 189 yards of total offense (147 passing yards and 42 rushing yards) and was held to 45 yards in the entire second half. Two of Michigan's touchdowns came on defense (Weathers' interception return) and special teams (Woodson's punt return). Griese, who was carried off the field by his teammates at the conclusion of the game, was Michigan's offensive leader, completing 14 of 25 passes for 147 yards and no interceptions. Thomas posted 29 rushing yards on 14 carries and was Michigan's leading receiver with 8 catches for 77 yards. Woodson also played a key role with his 78-yard punt return, third-quarter interception and 37-yard pass reception.

Michigan was ranked No. 1 in the AP poll and No. 2 in the Coaches Poll before the game, and Ohio State was ranked No. 4 in both polls. Florida State, which had been ranked No. 1 in the Coaches Poll, lost to Florida, leaving Michigan and Nebraska as the only major college teams who remained unbeaten. With the win over Ohio State and Florida State's loss, Michigan received 69 of 70 first place votes in the AP poll and 46 of 62 in the Coaches Poll. The Rose Bowl was set to have its first consensus No. 1 participant since Ohio State in the 1980 Rose Bowl.

== Postseason ==
=== Award season ===
During the 1997 award season, Charles Woodson became one of the most honored players in Michigan history. He was selected as Michigan's Most Valuable Player, a first-team All-Big Ten player and a first-team All-American. On December 1, 1997, he received the Walter Camp Award as the college football Player of the year. On December 11, 1997, Woodson also won the Bednarik Award as top defensive player and the Jim Thorpe Award as top defensive back. By a margin of 55 votes out of 2,500 votes cast, Woodson was beaten by Peyton Manning for the Maxwell Award. The award season culminated with the Heisman Trophy. Woodson was invited to the Downtown Athletic Club for the Heisman announcement along with fellow finalists Manning, Ryan Leaf, and Randy Moss. Woodson won the Heisman, edging Manning by a margin of 1815–1543 points and 433–281 first place votes. He became the first predominately defensive player to receive the award. Head coach Lloyd Carr won the Walter Camp Coach of the Year Award, the George Munger Award, and the Paul "Bear" Bryant Award.

=== Rose Bowl: Washington State ===
Bowl game: (7) Washington State at (1) Michigan
(1998 Rose Bowl)

Team	1	2	3	4	Total
Washington State (10–1)	7	0	6	3	16
• Michigan (11–0)	0	7	7	7	21

- Date: Thursday, January 1, 1998
- Location: Rose Bowl
  Pasadena, CA
- Game attendance: 101,219
- TV announcers (ABC): Keith Jackson and Bob Griese

Scoring summary
1	3:17	WSU	Kevin McKenzie 15-yard pass from Ryan Leaf (Rian Lindell kick)	WSU 7–0
2	7:08	MICH	Tai Streets 53-yard pass from Brian Griese (Jay Feely kick)	Tied 7–7
3	8:23	WSU	Shawn Tims 14-yard run (kick failed)	WSU 13–7
3	5:07	MICH	Tai Streets 58-yard pass from Brian Griese (Kraig Baker kick)	MICH 14–13
4	11:21	MICH	Jerame Tuman 23-yard pass from Brian Griese (Kraig Baker kick)	MICH 21–13
4	7:25	WSU	Rian Lindell 48-yard field goal	MICH 21–16

As the Big Ten champion, Michigan faced the Pac-10 champion Washington State Cougars in the 1998 Rose Bowl. The game matched the nation's best defense against the number two offense. Michigan's defense allowed an average of 206.9 yards per game through the regular season, while Washington State averaged 42.5 points and 502.1 yards a game. Washington State, which featured quarterback Ryan Leaf and a five-wideout offense, had established Pac-10 passing records with 3,637 yards and 33 touchdowns. The game marked Michigan's first Rose Bowl since 1993 and Washington State's first since 1931. Going into the game, Michigan held a 68–1 and 53.5–8.5 first place vote lead in the AP and Coaches Polls over fellow unbeaten Nebraska, respectively. The national television broadcast of the game featured announcers Bob Griese, the father of Michigan's quarterback, and Keith Jackson, a Washington State alumnus and former radio and television announcer for the Cougars.

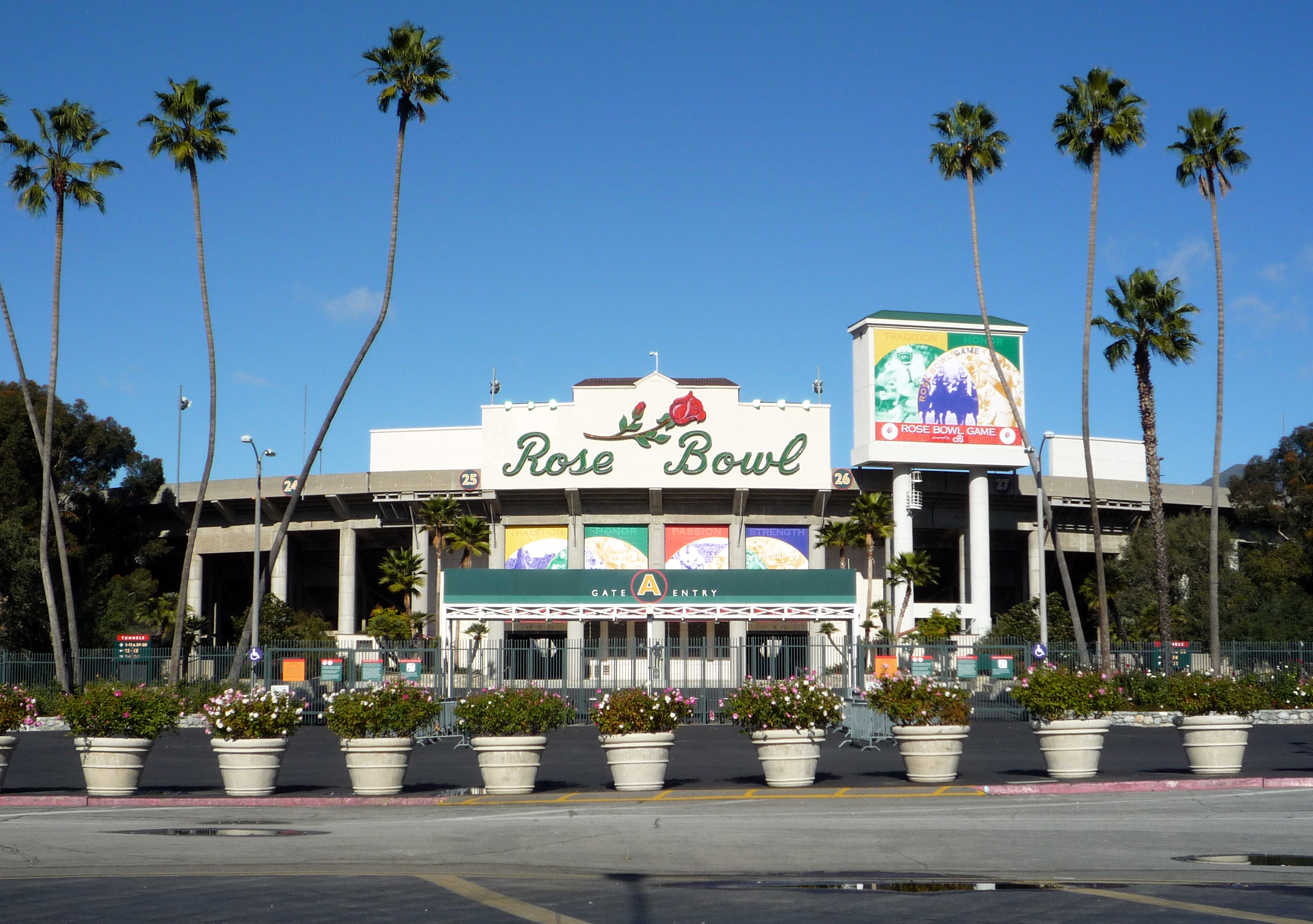
Michigan ended its season at the Rose Bowl. (pictured in 2008)

In the first quarter, Washington State downed a punt at Michigan's one-yard-line and forced the Wolverines to punt without a first down. After regaining possession at Michigan's 47-yard-line, Leaf threw a 15-yard touchdown pass to McKenzie to take a 7–0 lead with 3:07 remaining in the first quarter. On Washington State's next possession, Woodson intercepted Leaf in the end zone. Later, Griese found Tai Streets for a 53-yard touchdown pass to tie the game with 7:08 left in the first half.

Leaf opened the second half with a 99-yard drive for a go-ahead touchdown to take a 13–7 lead after the extra point was blocked by James Hall. On the ensuing possession, Griese threw a 58-yard touchdown pass to Streets on a play-action pass to take a 14–13 lead with 5:07 left in the third quarter. After a punt by Washington State, Griese led a 14-play, 77-yard drive that ended with a 23-yard play-action touchdown pass from Griese to Jerame Tuman, giving Michigan a 21–13 lead with 11:21 remaining in the fourth quarter. In the fourth quarter, Leaf converted a 3rd-and-18 play from his own 12 by connecting with McKenzie for 19 yards. Eventually, Washington State settled for a Rian Lindell 48-yard field goal with 7:25 to play to make the score 21–16. Michigan started a drive that included four consecutive third down conversions and consumed most of the clock. The conversions were as follows: a 3rd-and-11 Griese scrambled to the Michigan 29; a 3rd-and-7 lateral to Woodson who faked a pass before running eight yards to keep the drive alive; a 3rd-and-6 13-yard pass to Shaw; and a 3rd-and-7 pass to Woodson taking the ball to the Washington State 33. A pooch punt by Jay Feely from field goal formation left Washington on its own seven-yard-line with 29 seconds remaining. Washington State's final drive began at the Cougars 7-yard-line with 16 seconds left to play. Leaf completed a 46-yard pas to Nian Taylor to move the ball to the Michigan 47. Washington State drew an illegal formation penalty with nine seconds remaining, but executed a hook and lateral play for 26-yards to the Michigan 26-yard-line, with an eight-yard catch by Love Jefferson and an 18-yard run by Jason Clayton who was tackled by Weathers and Jones. With two seconds to play, the clock was stopped to move the chains. With no timeouts left, Leaf spiked the football, but Dick Burleson, the referee from the Southeastern Conference crew, shook his head as Leaf contested the decision. Michigan's victory evened the series between the Pac-10 and Big 10 in the Rose Bowl at 26 wins apiece.

Michigan totaled 379 yards of offense in the game, slightly less than the 398 yards of offense gained by Washington State. Griese, who was selected as the game's Most Valuable Player, completed 18 of 30 passes for 251 yards and three touchdowns. Leaf completed 17 of 35 passes for 331 passing yards, the fifth highest total in Rose Bowl history. Washington State running back Michael Black injured his calf muscle and was held to 24 yards on 7 carries, while the team totaled just 67 yards rushing. Streets had 4 receptions for 127 yards.

=== Final rankings ===
Following the Rose Bowl, Michigan needed to wait a few days for the final polls. On January 4, it was revealed that Nebraska had overtaken Michigan by four points and two first place votes in the coaches poll to earn a split in the major national polls. Nebraska had beaten Tennessee 42–17 and totaled 534 yards of total offense, including 409 rushing yards and an Orange Bowl record-setting 206 rushing yards by Ahman Green. Michigan held on to a 51.5–18.5 final first place vote lead in the AP poll, but had a 32–30 deficit in the coaches poll. Since the 1968 permanent creation of the final post bowl game AP poll, no winning No. 1 team had lost its lead following a bowl game, but the 1990 Colorado Buffaloes football team had lost the coaches poll to Georgia Tech following a 10–9 1991 Orange Bowl victory over Notre Dame. It is worth noting that Michigan gained the number one ranking earlier in the season, from Nebraska, after the Huskers defeated Missouri, in a game best known for the Flea Kicker play. Tom Osborne's retirement and the Big Ten's cumulative 2–5 bowl game record were considered factors leading to the split polls. Michigan was named as the national champion by the following polls: Associated Press, Football News, Football Writers Association of America, National Championship Foundation, National Football Foundation, and Sporting News.

== Statistical achievements ==
Michigan's 1997 defense set the NCAA Division I FBS record for fewest yards allowed per pass completion (8.8 yards per completion, 100–149 completions) Over the course of the 1997 season, including conference and non-conference games, Michigan's defense led the Big Ten Conference in most statistical categories, including rushing defense (89.0 yards per game), passing defense (133.8 yards per game), passing defense efficiency (81.8 points per game), total defense (222.8 yards per game) and scoring defense (9.5 points per game).

Michigan's 1997 season totals in total defense and scoring defense are the lowest marks among all Big Ten football teams since the 1985 season. The last Big Ten team with a lower scoring defense mark was the 1985 Michigan team that held opponents to 6.8 points per game. Including the 1997 season, Michigan won the Big Ten statistical championship in rushing defense six times in eight years from 1990 to 1997.

On offense, quarterback Brian Griese set Michigan single-season passing records with 193 pass completions and 307 pass attempts. In each case, Griese surpassed records set by Todd Collins in 1993; Tom Brady broke both of Griese's records in 1998.

== Coaching staff ==
Coach	Title
Lloyd Carr	Head coach
Mike DeBord	Offensive coordinator, offensive tackle coach, and tight ends coach
Jim Herrmann	Defensive coordinator and linebacker coach
Erik Campbell	Wide receivers coach
Fred Jackson	Assistant head coach and running backs coach
Vance Bedford	Secondary coach
Brady Hoke	Defensive line coach
Terry Malone	Offensive line coach
Bobby Morrison	Special teams coach
Stan Parrish	Quarterbacks coach

== Players ==
=== Offensive starting lineup and awards ===
Player	Position	Games started	Awards	NFL Years
Zach Adami	Center; Right guard	11; 1	1997 All-Big Ten	0
Jeff Backus	Left tackle	12		9
Brian Griese	Quarterback	12	1997 All-Big Ten	11
Steve Hutchinson	Left guard	12	1999 First-team All-American (PFW, CNNSI); 2000 First-team All-American (AP, Walter Camp, AFCA-Coaches, FWAA, PFW, FN, CNNSI, Rivals); 1997 All-Big Ten	9
Jon Jansen	Right tackle	12	1998 First-team All-American (AFCA-Coaches); 1997 All-Big Ten	12
Tai Streets	Split end	12		6
Russell Shaw	Flanker	11		0
Chris Howard	Tailback	10		3
Jerame Tuman	Tight end	10	1997 First-team All-American (Football News); All-Big Ten	10
Chris Ziemann	Right guard	9		1
Chris Floyd	Fullback	8		3
David Brandt	Right guard	2		4
Mark Campbell	Tight end Fullback	1; 1		10
Demetrius Smith	Fullback	2		0
Clarence Williams	Tailback	2		1
Steve Frazier	Center	1		0
Marcus Knight	Flanker	1		2
Aaron Shea	Fullback	1		6
Charles Woodson	Flanker	1	Awards listed below	17

=== Defensive starting lineup and awards ===
Player	Position	Games started	Awards	NFL Years
Tommy Hendricks	Free safety	12		5
Marcus Ray	Strong safety	12	1997 All-Big Ten	1
Rob Renes	Nose tackle	12	1999 First-team All-American (The Sporting News)	0
Charles Woodson	Strongside cornerback	12	Big Ten Football MVP, Heisman Trophy, Walter Camp Award, Chuck Bednarik Award, Bronko Nagurski Trophy, Jim Thorpe Award; 1997 First-team All-American (AP, AFCA-Coaches, FWAA-Writers, Walter Camp, TSN, FN); 1996 First-team All-American (AP, FWAA-Writers); 1997 All-Big Ten	17
James Hall	Right linebacker	11		12
Glen Steele	Defensive end	11	1997 First-team All-American (AFCA-Coaches); 1997 All-Big Ten	6
Sam Sword	Inside linebacker	11	1997 All-Big Ten	4
Josh Williams	Defensive tackle	11		6
Andre Weathers	Weakside cornerback	10	1997 All-Big Ten	2
Dhani Jones	Inside linebacker	9		10
Clint Copenhaver	Outside linebacker	8		0
Eric Mayes	Inside linebacker	3		0
Rob Swett	Outside linebacker	3		0
Juaquin Feazell	Right linebacker Defensive tackle Defensive end	1; 1; 1		0
Ian Gold	Inside linebacker	1		8
DeWayne Patmon	Outside linebacker	1		2
William Peterson	Weakside cornerback	1		9
Daydrion Taylor	Weakside cornerback	1		0

=== Full roster ===
No.	Name	Pos.	Class	Hgt.	Wgt.	Hometown	State	High school / Previous college
68	Zach Adami	OG	Sr.	6–5	282	Maumelle	AR	Little Rock Catholic
75	Adam Adkins	OL	Fr.	6–4	260	Troy	MI	Troy
37	Kurt Anderson	LB	Fr.	6–5	240	Glenview	IL	Glenbrook South
34	John Anes	FB	So.	6–2	224	Kentwood	MI	East Kentwood
79	Jeff Backus	OT	So.	6–6	273	Norcross	GA	Norcross
46	Kraig Baker	PK	Sr.	6–1	188	Terre Haute	IN	North
18	Mark Bergin	QB	Jr.	6–2	195	Rochester Hills	MI	Rochester
51	Eric Brackins	LB	Fr.	6–2	208	Pigeon Forge	TN	Gatlinburg-Pittman
10	Tom Brady	QB	So.	6–5	215	San Mateo	CA	Serra
67	David Brandt	C	So.	6–4	276	Jenison	MI	Jenison
59	Grady Brooks	OLB	So.	6–2	256	Dallas	TX	Lincoln
74	Jason Brooks	OL	Fr.	6–4	267	Cleveland	OH	St. Ignatius
3	Todd Brooks	WR	Sr.	6–0	193	Freeport	IL	Freeport
18	LeAundre Brown	CB	So.	5–10	177	Arlington	TX	O. D. Wyatt
22	Kevin Bryant	WR	Jr.	6–0	175	Farmington Hills	MI	Harrison
88	Mark Campbell	TE	Sr.	6–6	250	Clawson	MI	Bishop Foley
82	Chad Carpenter	TE	So.	6–4	243	Bloomington	IN	South
42	Jared Chandler	PK	So.	6–1	170	Westlake	OH	Westlake
29	Michael Weaver	DE	Jr.	6–0	236	Buffalo	NY	New York
43	Clint Copenhaver	OLB	Sr.	6–4	237	Brighton	MI	Brighton
50	David Crispin	ILB	Sr.	6–1	234	Dearborn Heights	MI	Crestwood / Air Force
34	Jason Cummings	RB	Sr.	5–11	171	Kalamazoo	MI	Central
95	Jeff Del Verne	PK	So.	5–11	217	Sylvania	OH	St. John's
4	David Downs	CB	Jr.	5–7	167	Detroit	MI	Cass Tech / Holy Cross
12	Scott Dreisbach	QB	Sr.	6–4	208	Mishawaka	IN	Penn
6	Manus Edwards	TB	So.	5–8	178	Henderson	NV	Green Valley
90	Juaquin Feazell	DE	Sr.	6–4	268	Fort Valley	GA	Peach County
49	Jay Feely	PK	Sr.	5–10	190	Odessa	FL	Tampa Jesuit
7	Chris Floyd	FB	Sr.	6–1	227	Detroit	MI	Cooley
39	J. R. Ford	RB	Jr.	5–8	184	Columbus	OH	Independence
36	Robert Fraumann	LB	Fr.	6–3	210	Deerfield	IL	Deerfield
64	Steve Frazier	C	Jr.	6–4	280	Kingwood	TX	Kingwood
99	Jake Frysinger	LB	Fr.	6–4	235	Grosse Ile	MI	Grosse Ile
20	Ian Gold	RB	So.	6–1	200	Belleville	MI	Belleville
14	Brian Griese	QB	Sr.	6–3	207	Miami	FL	Columbus
56	James Hall	DE	Jr.	6–3	250	New Orleans	LA	St. Augustine
41	Tommy Hendricks	CB	So.	6–2	200	Houston	TX	Eisenhower
17	Chad Henman	WR	So.	5–10	181	Temperance	MI	Bedford
45	Jeff Holtry	OLB	So.	6–3	235	Salt Lake City	UT	West
8	Chris Howard	RB	Sr.	5–11	214	River Ridge	LA	John Curtis
53	Ben Huff	DT	Sr.	6–4	273	Charlotte	NC	Providence
76	Steve Hutchinson	OG	So.	6–5	293	Coral Springs	FL	Coral Springs
31	Kenneth Jackson	CB	Jr.	5–10	179	Houston	TX	Cypress Creek
35	Ray Jackson	TB	Fr.	6–4	210	Indianapolis	IN	Lawrence Central
77	Jon Jansen	OT	Sr.	6–7	298	Clawson	MI	Clawson
9	DiAllo Johnson	FS	Jr.	6–3	185	Detroit	MI	Orchard Lake St. Mary's
83	Jerry Johnson	WR	So.	6–4	180	Crowley	LA	Crowley
49	Matthew Johnson	SS	Jr.	5–10	180	New Buffalo	MI	New Buffalo
55	Dhani Jones	ILB	So.	6–2	220	Potomac	MD	Winston Churchill
38	Anthony Jordan	LB	Fr.	6–1	210	Jersey City	NJ	St. Peters Prep
13	Jason Kapsner	QB	So.	6–6	220	Eden Prairie	MN	Eden Prairie
85	Marcus Knight	WR	So.	6–1	180	Sylacauga	AL	Comer
3	Brandon Kornblue	PK	Jr.	5–10	160	Boca Raton	FL	Boca Raton
95	Patrick Kratus	DE	Jr.	6–3	260	Rocky River	OH	St. Ignatius
70	Ben Mast	OL	Fr.	6–5	285	Massillon	OH	Washington
26	Eric Mayes	ILB	Sr.	5–11	220	Kalamazoo	MI	Portage Northern
24	Patrick McCall	RB	Fr.	5–11	189	Carson	CA	Carson
60	Nate Miller	OG-C	Sr.	6–3	264	Imlay City	MI	Imlay City
69	Todd Mossa	OL	Fr.	6–4	295	Darien	CT	Darien
97	Lance Ostrom	TE	Sr.	6–7	255	Plainwell	MI	Plainwell
23	Scott Parachek	WR	Sr.	6–1	191	Temperance	MI	Bedford
8	Ryan Parini	FS	So.	6–2	179	Grand Rapids	MI	Catholic Central
78	Noah Parker	OG	Sr.	6–4	283	Milton	FL	Milton
15	DeWayne Patmon	DB	Fr.	6–1	183	San Diego	CA	Patrick Henry
23	William Peterson	DB	Fr.	6–0	197	Uniontown	PA	Laurel Highlands
45	Darren Petterson	WR	Sr.	5–10	172	Flint	MI	Carman-Ainsworth
71	Jeff Potts	OT	Jr.	6–7	290	Three Rivers	MI	Three Rivers
25	Terrence Quinn	WR	Sr.	5–10	187	Flint	MI	Northwestern
58	Rob Renes	NT	Jr.	6–1	279	Holland	MI	West Ottawa
40	Eric Rose	DB	Fr.	6–3	200	Liberal	KS	Liberal
93	Chris Roth	FB	So.	5–11	204	Windsor	ON	Belle River
17	Cory Sargent	P	So.	6–3	185	South Lyon	MI	South Lyon
42	Tate Schanski	RB	Jr.	5–11	191	Perry	MI	Perry
65	Andy Sechler	OLB	So.	6–1	197	Union City	MI	Union City
66	Bill Seymour	DL	Fr.	6–4	227	Granger	IN	Penn
4	Russell Shaw	WR	Sr.	6–0	180	Los Angeles	CA	Locke / El Camino CC
36	Aaron Shea	TE	Jr.	6–4	250	Ottawa	IL	Ottawa
57	Chris Singletary	OLB	Sr.	6–2	240	Detroit	MI	St. Martin de Porres
27	Demetrius Smith	FB	Fr.	6–2	265	Calumet Park	IL	Richards
99	Jeff Smokevitch	ILB	Jr.	6–0	207	Birmingham	MI	Seaholm
81	Glen Steele	DE	Sr.	6–5	281	Ligonier	IN	West Noble
92	Chad Stock	PK	Jr.	5–10	185	Temperance	MI	Bedford
86	Tai Streets	WR	Jr.	6–4	185	Matteson	IL	Thornton Township
44	Rob Swett	ILB	Sr.	6–3	229	Chalfont	PA	Central Bucks West
93	Sam Sword	ILB	Sr.	6–2	242	Saginaw	MI	Arthur Hill
73	Paul Tannous	OT	So.	6–5	270	Houston	TX	Cypress Creek
28	Daydrion Taylor	FS	Jr.	6–0	192	Longview	TX	Longview
32	Anthony Thomas	RB	Fr.	6–1	220	Winnfield	LA	Winnfield
84	Shawn Thompson	TE	Fr.	6–4	220	Saginaw	MI	Nouvel
80	Jerame Tuman	TE	Sr.	6–5	233	Liberal	KS	Liberal
38	Jason Vinson	P	Sr.	6–2	194	Troy	MI	Troy
63	Eric Warner	OG	So.	6–5	250	Brighton	MI	Brighton
16	Brent Washington	CB	Jr.	6–0	184	Inkster	MI	John Glenn
30	Andre Weathers	CB	Sr.	6–0	183	Flint	MI	Central
5	James Whitley	DB	Fr.	6–0	180	Norfolk	VA	Norview
33	Clarence Williams	RB	Jr.	5–9	196	Detroit	MI	Cass Tech
15	Dan Williams	QB	So.	6–0	164	Temperance	MI	Bedford
91	Josh Williams	DT	Jr.	6–3	270	Houston	TX	Cypress Creek
5	Maurice Williams	DL	Fr.	6–7	280	Detroit	MI	Pershing
94	Eric Wilson	DT	So.	6–4	266	Monroe	MI	Monroe
2	Charles Woodson	CB	Jr.	6–1	197	Fremont	OH	Ross
19	Aaron Wright	WR	So.	6–0	172	Highland Village	TX	Marcus
52	Chris Ziemann	OT	Jr.	6–7	270	Aurora	IL	Waubonsie Valley

=== Players selected in the 1998 NFL draft ===
On the last day that underclassmen could declare for the 1998 NFL draft in early January, junior Woodson decided to forgo his collegiate eligibility. Woodson joined a class of more than a dozen underclassmen that included Leaf, Moss, Green, Enis, Takeo Spikes, Benji Olson and Olin Kreutz. Underclassmen who returned for more college play included Donovan McNabb, Kevin Faulk and Amos Zereoué. The following Michigan players were selected in the 1998 NFL draft.

Player	Position	Round	Pick	NFL club
Charles Woodson	Cornerback	1	4	Oakland Raiders
Chris Floyd	Fullback	3	81	New England Patriots
Brian Griese	Quarterback	3	91	Denver Broncos
Glen Steele	Defensive tackle	4	105	Cincinnati Bengals
Chris Howard	Running back	5	153	Denver Broncos

== Statistics ==
=== Offensive statistics ===
==== Rushing ====
Player	GP	Att	Net Yards	Yds/Att	TD	Long
Chris Howard	12	199	938	4.7	7	51
Anthony Thomas	12	137	549	4.0	5	58
Clarence Williams	9	59	276	4.7	1	16
Chris Floyd	11	63	269	4.3	2	31
Patrick McCall	9	13	41	3.1	1	11
Ray Jackson	6	11	41	3.7	0	18
Tate Schanski	10	4	25	6.3	1	11
Charles Woodson	12	5	21	4.2	1	33
Brian Griese	12	58	20	0.3	2	40

==== Passing ====
Player	GP	Att	Comp	Int	Comp %	Yds	Yds/Comp	TD	Long
Brian Griese	12	307	193	6	62.9	2293	11.9	17	58
Tom Brady	4	15	12	0	80.0	103	8.6	0	26
Charles Woodson	12	1	1	0	100.0	28	28.0	0	28
Jason Kapsner	3	3	2	0	66.7	21	10.5	0	20
Scott Dreisbach	3	3	1	0	33.3	19	19.0	0	19

==== Receiving ====
Player	GP	Recp	Yds	Yds/Recp	Yds/GP	TD	Long
Tai Streets	12	28	476	17.0	39.7	6	58
Jerame Tuman	11	29	437	15.1	39.7	5	53
Russell Shaw	12	25	284	11.4	23.7	2	39
Chris Howard	12	37	276	7.5	23.0	1	26
Charles Woodson	12	12	238	19.8	19.8	2	37
Anthony Thomas	12	22	219	9.9	18.3	0	28
Clarence Williams	9	22	179	8.1	19.9	0	26
Aaron Shea	12	9	85	9.4	7.1	0	23
Chris Floyd	11	7	83	11.9	7.5	0	43
Mark Campbell	12	6	61	10.2	5.1	1	24
Patrick McCall	9	5	32	6.4	3.6	0	10
Marcus Knight	11	3	30	10.0	2.7	0	20
Brian Griese	12	1	28	28.0	2.3	0	28
Kevin Bryant	11	1	18	18.0	1.6	0	18
Aaron Wright	8	1	17	17.0	2.1	0	17
Chris Roth	1	1	1	1.0	1.0	0	1

=== Defensive statistics ===
==== Tackles, tackles for loss, and sacks ====
Player	GP	Tac	Ast	Tot	TFL	TFL Yds	Sack	Sack Yds
Sam Sword	11	69	22	91	12	25	2	9
Dhani Jones	12	62	28	90	9	39	6	36
Marcus Ray	12	44	27	71	4	11	0	0
Tommy Hendricks	12	37	23	60	3	6	0	0
Josh Williams	12	32	21	53	11	60	7	43
James Hall	12	30	21	51	8	45	8.5	29
Glen Steele	10	32	16	48	14	62	7	48
Andre Weathers	11	33	14	47	3	10	0	0
Rob Renes	11	30	17	47	9	35	4	23
Charles Woodson	12	27	17	44	5	23	1	11
Ian Gold	12	24	10	34	3	4	0	0
Clint Copenhaver	12	19	10	29	7	23	1	8
Juaquin Feazell	12	18	10	28	6	39	4	35
Eric Mayes	4	15	10	25	2	5	0	0
William Peterson	12	18	6	24	2	4	0	0
James Whitley	12	16	3	19	0	0	0	0
Daydrion Taylor	8	13	3	16	0	0	0	0
DeWayne Patmon	9	6	5	11	0	0	0	0
Eric Wilson	11	6	5	11	1	3	1	3
Rob Swett	11	3	7	10	1	1	0	0
Brent Washington	8	6	1	7	0	0	0	0
Jake Frysinger	11	6	0	6	0	0	0	0
Grady Brooks	8	5	1	6	0	0	0	0
Ken Jackson	7	4	2	6	0	0	0	0
Aaron Shea	12	5	0	5	0	0	0	0
Pat Kratus	7	3	2	5	0	0	0	0

==== Interceptions and pass break-ups ====
Player	GP	Int	Int Rtrn Yards	TD off Int	Long Int Rtrn	Pass Break-ups
Charles Woodson	12	8	7	0	4	9
Marcus Ray	12	5	43	0	30	4
Andre Weathers	11	2	53	1	43	4
Tommy Hendricks	12	2	0	0	0	2
DiAllo Johnson	6	1	37	0	37	2
Clint Copenhaver	12	1	19	0	19	2
Dhani Jones	12	1	17	0	17	1
Daydrion Taylor	8	1	0	0	0	0
Sam Sword	11	1	0	0	0	2
DeWayne Patmon	9	1	0	0	0	0
William Peterson	12	0	0	0	0	5
Juaquin Feazell	12	0	0	0	0	1
James Whitley	12	0	0	0	0	3
James Hall	12	0	0	0	0	3
Ian Gold	11	0	0	0	0	2
Rob Renes	11	0	0	0	0	2
Josh Williams	12	0	0	0	0	1
Eric Wilson	11	0	0	0	0	1
Brent Washington	8	0	0	0	0	1
Eric Mayes	4	0	0	0	0	1
Jeff Holtry	4	0	0	0	0	1

=== Special teams statistics ===
==== Kickoff returns ====
Player	GP	Returns	Yds	Yds/Rtrn	TD	Long
Clarence Williams	9	14	285	20.4	0	31
Anthony Thomas	12	8	200	25.0	0	43
Tate Schanski	10	2	23	11.5	0	15
Kevin Bryant	11	1	18	18.0	0	18
Eric Wilson	11	1	0	0.0	0	0

==== Punt returns ====
Player	GP	Returns	Yds	Yds/Rtrn	TD	Long
Charles Woodson	12	36	301	8.4	1	78
Russell Shaw	12	11	80	7.3	0	27
James Whitley	12	3	15	5.0	0	7
DiAllo Johnson	6	1	13	13.0	0	13
Jake Frysinder	11	0	4		0	4

==== Punts ====
Player	GP	Punts	Yds	Yds/Punt	Long	50+	Inside 20	T'back
Jason Vinson	12	57	2183	38.3	54	7	15	4
Brian Griese	12	3	117	39.0	41	0	2	1
Kraig Baker	12	1	36	36.0	36	0	0	1
Jay Feely	12	1	23	23.0	23	0	0	0

==== Field goals ====
Player	GP	FGs	Att	Long	Blocked
Kraig Baker	12	14	19	42	0
Jay Feely	12	3	4	51	0

==== PAT conversions ====
Player	GP	Att	Made
Kraig Baker	12	37	35
Jay Feely	12	2	2

== Awards and honors ==
The individuals in the sections below earned recognition for meritorious performances.

=== National ===
- All-Americans: Charles Woodson, Glen Steele, Jerame Tuman
- Heisman Trophy: Woodson
- Walter Camp Award: Woodson
- Sporting News College Football Player of the Year: Woodson
- Chic Harley Award: Woodson
- Bronko Nagurski Trophy: Woodson
- Chuck Bednarik Award: Woodson
- Jim Thorpe Award: Woodson
- Jack Tatum Trophy: Woodson
- Walter Camp Coach of the Year Award: Lloyd Carr
- George Munger Award: Carr
- Paul "Bear" Bryant Award: Carr
- Broyles Award: Jim Herrmann

=== Conference ===
- All-Conference: Charles Woodson, Marcus Ray, Jerame Tuman, Brian Griese, Zach Adami, Steve Hutchinson, Jon Jansen, Glen Steele, Sam Sword, Andre Weathers
- Big Ten Football MVP: Woodson
- Big Ten Athlete of the Year (all sports): Woodson
- Big Ten Defensive Player of the Year: Woodson
- Big Ten Freshman of the Year: Anthony Thomas

=== Team ===
- Captains: Jon Jansen, Eric Mayes
- Most Valuable Player: Charles Woodson
- Meyer Morton Award: Clint Copenhaver
- John Maulbetsch Award: Marcus Knight
- Frederick Matthei Award: Clarence Williams
- Arthur Robinson Scholarship Award: Rob Renes
- Dick Katcher Award: Glen Steele
- Hugh Rader Jr. Award: Zach Adami
- Robert P. Ufer Award: Chris Floyd
- Roger Zatkoff Award: Sam Sword
