= 1998 All-Big Ten Conference football team =

American college football all-star team

The 1998 All-Big Ten Conference football team consists of American football players chosen as All-Big Ten Conference players for the 1998 NCAA Division I-A football season. The conference recognizes two official All-Big Ten selectors: (1) the Big Ten conference coaches selected separate offensive and defensive units and named first- and second-team players (the "Coaches" team); and (2) a panel of sports writers and broadcasters covering the Big Ten also selected offensive and defensive units and named first- and second-team players (the "Media" team).

== Offensive selections ==
=== Quarterbacks ===
- Joe Germaine, Ohio State (Coaches-1; Media-1)
- Drew Brees, Purdue Coaches-2; Media-2)

=== Running backs ===
- Ron Dayne, Wisconsin (Coaches-1; Media-1)
- Michael Wiley, Ohio State (Coaches-1; Media-1)
- Sedrick Irvin, Michigan State (Coaches-2; Media-2)
- Thomas Hamner, Minnesota (Coaches-2; Media-2)

=== Centers ===
- Jason Strayhorn, Michigan State (Coaches-1; Media-1)
- Casey Rabach, Wisconsin (Coaches-2; Media-2)

=== Guards ===
- Steve Hutchinson, Michigan (Coaches-1; Media-1)
- Rob Murphy, Ohio State (Coaches-1; Media-1)
- Ben Gilbert, Ohio State (Coaches-2; Media-2)
- Chukky Okobi, Purdue (Coaches-2)
- Kareem McKenzie, Penn State (Media-2)

=== Tackles ===
- Jon Jansen, Michigan (Coaches-1; Media-1)
- Floyd Wedderburn, Penn State (Coaches-1; Media-2)
- Aaron Gibson, Wisconsin (Coaches-2; Media-1)
- Chris McIntosh, Wisconsin (Coaches-2)
- Jeff Backus, Michigan (Media-2)

=== Tight ends ===
- Jerame Tuman, Michigan (Coaches-1; Media-1)
- John Lumpkin, Ohio State (Coaches-2; Media-2)

=== Receivers ===
- David Boston, Ohio State (Coaches-1; Media-1)
- D'Wayne Bates, Northwestern (Coaches-1; Media-1)
- Tai Streets, Michigan (Coaches-2; Media-2)
- Dee Miller, Ohio State (Coaches-2; Media-2)
- Plaxico Burress, Michigan State (Media-2)

== Defensive selections ==
=== Defensive linemen ===
- Tom Burke, Wisconsin (Coaches-1; Media-1)
- Rosevelt Colvin, Purdue (Coaches-1; Media-1)
- Jared DeVries, Iowa (Coaches-1; Media-1)
- Brad Scioli, Penn State (Coaches-1; Media-2)
- Courtney Brown, Penn State (Coaches-2; Media-1)
- Adewale Ogunleye, Indiana (Coaches-2; Media-2)
- James Hall, Michigan (Coaches-2; Media-2)
- Robert Newkirk, Michigan State (Coaches-2)
- Rob Renes, Michigan (Media-2)

=== Linebackers ===
- LaVar Arrington, Penn State (Coaches-1; Media-1)
- Na'il Diggs, Ohio State (Coaches-1; Media-2)
- Brandon Short, Penn State (Coaches-1)
- Barry Gardner, Northwestern (Coaches-2; Media-1)
- Andy Katzenmoyer, Ohio State (Coaches-2; Media-1)
- Sam Sword, Michigan (Coaches-2; Media-2)
- Ian Gold, Michigan (Media-2)

=== Defensive backs ===
- Antoine Winfield, Ohio State (Coaches-1; Media-1)
- Tyrone Carter, Minnesota (Coaches-1; Media-1)
- Damon Moore, Ohio State (Coaches-1; Media-1)
- David Macklin, Penn State (Coaches-1; Media-2)
- Jamar Fletcher, Wisconsin (Coaches-2; Media-1)
- Tommy Hendricks, Michigan (Coaches-2; Media-2)
- Andre Weathers, Michigan (Coaches-2)
- Sorie Kanu, Michigan State (Coaches-2)
- Ahmed Plummer, Ohio State (Media-2)
- Eric Thigpen, Iowa (Media-2)

== Special teams ==
=== Kickers ===
- Matt Davenport, Wisconsin (Coaches-1; Media-1)
- Paul Edinger, Michigan State (Coaches-2; Media-2)

=== Punters ===
- Kevin Stemke, Wisconsin (Coaches-1; Media-1)
- Brent Bartholomew, Ohio State (Coaches-2)
- Craig Jarrett, Michigan State (Media-2)

== Key ==
Bold = selected as a first-team player by both the coaches and media panel

Coaches = selected by Big Ten Conference coaches

Media = selected by a media panel

== See also ==
- 1998 College Football All-America Team
