= Glen Steele =

American football player (born 1974)

No. 70
- Positions: Defensive end, defensive tackle

Personal information
- Born: October 4, 1974 (age 52); Ligonier, Indiana, U.S.
- Listed height: 6 ft 4 in (1.93 m)
- Listed weight: 300 lb (136 kg)

Career information
- High school: West Noble (Ligonier)
- College: Michigan
- NFL draft: 1998: 4th round, 105th overall pick

Career history
- Cincinnati Bengals (1998–2003); New York Giants (2004)*; Cincinnati Bengals (2004)*
- * Offseason or practice squad member only

Awards and highlights
- National champion (1997); First-team All-American (1997); First-team All-Big Ten (1997)

Career NFL statistics
- Tackles: 101
- Sacks: 3.5
- Fumble recoveries: 1
- Stats at Pro Football Reference

James Lendale Steele Jr. (/ˈstiːl/; born October 4, 1974) is an American former professional football player who was a defensive lineman and spent his entire six-year National Football League (NFL) career with the Cincinnati Bengals. The Bengals selected him in the 1998 NFL draft. He played college football for the Michigan Wolverines, earning first-team All-American honors at defensive end as a member of the undefeated national champion 1997 Wolverines team.

== Early life and college ==
Steele attended West Noble High School, just outside Ligonier, Indiana. Steele, who wore No. 81 for the Michigan Wolverines, redshirted as a freshman in during the 1993 season and earned varsity letters in each of the subsequent four seasons from 1994 to 1997. He played for the 1997 Michigan Wolverines football team that won a national championship. He won the Richard Katcher Award as the top Michigan defensive lineman in 1997. Steele had 45 tackles for loss and 24 career quarterback sacks at Michigan, second most in team history at the time of his graduation. He was named a first-team selection to the 1997 All-Big Ten Conference football team and a first-team selection by the American Football Coaches Association to the 1997 College Football All-America Team.

== Professional career ==
Steele was selected by the Cincinnati Bengals in the fourth round of the 1998 NFL Draft with the 105th selection overall. Steele played in 80 consecutive games with the Bengals between 1999 and 2003 before being released on September 5, 2004. Steele had signed with the New York Giants during the offseason following the 2003 season. He was released on July 30, 2004, and signed by the Bengals who later released him. He later tried out with the San Francisco 49ers.

== See also ==
- List of Michigan Wolverines football All-Americans
