= Russell Shaw (American football) =

American football player (born 1976)

Profile
- Positions: Wide receiver, defensive back

Personal information
- Born: February 25, 1976 (age 50); Los Angeles, California, U.S.
- Listed height: 6 ft 2 in (1.88 m)
- Listed weight: 210 lb (95 kg)

Career information
- College: Michigan

Career history
- Los Angeles Avengers (2001–2004); Chicago Rush (2005–2007)

Awards and highlights
- ArenaBowl champion (2006); National champion (1997)

Russell Lee Shaw Jr. (born February 25, 1976) is an American former professional football wide receiver and defensive back who played for the Los Angeles Avengers and Chicago Rush in the Arena Football League (AFL). He attended the University of Michigan.
