= Chris Floyd =

American football player (born 1975)

No. 37, 34
- Positions: Fullback, special teams

Personal information
- Born: June 23, 1975 (age 51); Detroit, Michigan, U.S.
- Listed height: 6 ft 2 in (1.88 m)
- Listed weight: 235 lb (107 kg)

Career information
- High school: Cooley (Detroit)
- College: Michigan
- NFL draft: 1998: 3rd round, 81st overall pick

Career history
- New England Patriots (1998–2000); Cleveland Browns (2000); Chicago Bears (2001)*; Cleveland Browns (2002)*; La Crosse Night Train (2003)
- * Offseason or practice squad member only

Awards and highlights
- National champion (1997)

Career NFL statistics
- Rushing yards: 33
- Average: 2.4
- Receptions: 4
- Receiving yards: 43
- Stats at Pro Football Reference

Christopher Michael Floyd (born June 23, 1975) is an American former professional football player in the National Football League (NFL). He played college football as a fullback for the University of Michigan from 1994 to 1997. As a senior, he was a member of the undefeated national champion 1997 Michigan Wolverines football team. He played in the NFL, principally as a special team player, for the New England Patriots from 1998 to 2000 and briefly for the Cleveland Browns at the end of the 2000 season.

== Early life ==
Floyd was born in Detroit, Michigan, in 1975. He attended Cooley High School in Detroit. Playing at fullback, Floyd was at the center of the offense for Cooley's football team, sometimes carrying the ball as many as 30 times.

== University of Michigan ==
Floyd enrolled at the University of Michigan in 1994 and played for the Michigan Wolverines football teams from 1994 to 1997.

As a freshman in 1994, Floyd was a backup to Tyrone Wheatley and Tshimanga Biakabutuka at the tailback position. Floyd carried the ball in four games, rushing for 71 yards on 10 carries (10.1 yards per carry), including a career-long 54-yard run against Minnesota on October 28, 1995. At the end of the 1994 season, Floyd was asked to backup Ché Foster at fullback for the 1994 Holiday Bowl.

As a sophomore, Floyd moved to the fullback position, where he started six games for the 1995 Michigan team. He carried the ball 48 times during the 1995 season for 194 net rushing yards (3.8 yards per carry).

As a junior, Floyd started seven games at fullback for the 1996 Michigan team. He carried the ball 30 times during the 1995 season for 101 net rushing yards (3.4 yards per carry). After the 1996 season, Floyd was frustrated with his limited role as a fullback and considered transferring to another school. Assistant coaches Mike Gittleson and Mike DeBord persuaded him to stay.

As a senior, Floyd started eight games at fullback for the undefeated 1997 team that compiled a 12-0 record, outscored opponents 322-144, and was ranked #1 in the final AP Poll. He carried the ball 63 times for 269 yards and two touchdowns in 1997. His larger contributions were as a blocker. He saved quarterback Brian Griese from blitzing defenders numerous times during the 1997 season. Floyd considered the 1997 Ohio State game to be his best at Michigan. He made numerous blocks in the game, including a key block on Na'il Diggs that allowed Griese the time needed to throw a 37-yard pass to Charles Woodson for Michigan's first touchdown. Floyd later recalled, "It got to the point where I knew [Ohio State blitzers] were coming and they knew I was going to block them. I would point at the guy blitzing and tell him to bring it on."

In four years at Michigan, Floyd carried the ball 148 times for 623 net rushing yards and two touchdowns. He also caught 14 passes for 125 receiving yards.

== Professional football ==
Floyd was selected by the New England Patriots in the third round (81st overall pick) of the 1998 NFL draft. As a rookie in 1998, he appeared in all 16 games for the Patriots, including two as a starter. He was used mostly on special teams and gained 22 rushing yards on six carries during the 1998 New England Patriots season. In 1999, he appeared in 13 games, none as a starter, again played principally on special teams and gained 12 rushing yards on six carries and added two pass receptions for 16 yards. Floyd appeared in 11 games for the Patriots in 2000, mostly on special teams. He was cut by the Patriots after a penalty-filled game on Thanksgiving Day against the Detroit Lions.

Floyd was picked up by the Cleveland Browns and appeared in two games with no rushing attempts at the end of the 2000 season. Over the next two years, Floyd had tryouts with the Detroit Lions, Atlanta Falcons and Buffalo Bills, but did not make it with those teams. He also played briefly with the La Crosse Night Train of the National Indoor Football League.

In three NFL seasons, Floyd appeared in 40 games, only two as a starter. He was used principally on special teams, and he totaled only 33 rushing yards on 14 carries and 43 receiving yards on four receptions.

Chris Floyd owns and manages real estate throughout Detroit and has recently expanded to Houston, Texas and Medellín, Colombia.
