= Aaron Shea =

American football player (born 1976)

No. 80, 83
- Positions: Tight end, fullback

Personal information
- Born: December 5, 1976 (age 49); Ottawa, Illinois, U.S.
- Listed height: 6 ft 3 in (1.91 m)
- Listed weight: 248 lb (112 kg)

Career information
- High school: Ottawa Township
- College: Michigan
- NFL draft: 2000: 4th round, 110th overall pick

Career history
- Cleveland Browns (2000–2005); San Diego Chargers (2006)

Awards and highlights
- National champion (1997)

Career NFL statistics
- Receptions: 97
- Receiving yards: 851
- Receiving touchdowns: 7
- Stats at Pro Football Reference

Aaron T. Shea (born December 5, 1976) is an American former professional football player who was a tight end in the National Football League (NFL). He was selected by the Cleveland Browns in the fourth round of the 2000 NFL draft. He played college football for the Michigan Wolverines.

Shea also played for the San Diego Chargers.

== College career ==
Shea attended the University of Michigan where he played fullback and tight end.

== Professional career ==
Pre-draft measurables
Height	Weight	Arm length	Hand span	40-yard dash	10-yard split	20-yard split	20-yard shuttle	Three-cone drill	Vertical jump	Broad jump
6 ft 4 1/4 in (1.94 m)	253 lb (115 kg)	31 1/2 in (0.80 m)	9 7/8 in (0.25 m)	4.79 s	1.62 s	2.75 s	4.30 s	6.72 s	37.5 in (0.95 m)	9 ft 6 in (2.90 m)
All values from NFL Combine

=== Cleveland Browns ===
He was selected by the Cleveland Browns in the fourth round (110th overall) of the 2000 NFL draft and went on to play six seasons for Cleveland. During his time there, he caught 97 passes for 851 yards and seven touchdowns. He fumbled only once in his career - during his rookie season in 2000.

=== San Diego Chargers ===
As a free agent in the 2006 offseason a handful of teams were reportedly interested in Shea, including the Houston Texans, Pittsburgh Steelers, San Diego Chargers, San Francisco 49ers and Seattle Seahawks. On March 17, Shea signed a three-year contract with San Diego. A back injury bothered him throughout the preseason and forced him to miss the team's first three regular season contests. On September 26, he was placed on season-ending injured reserve.

Shea was released after just one season in San Diego on March 2, 2007.

== NFL career statistics ==
Legend
	Led the league
**Bold**	Career high

=== Regular season ===
Year	Team	Games		Receiving					Fumbles	
Year	Team	GP	GS	Rec	Yds	Avg	Lng	TD	Fum	Lost
2000	CLE	**15**	**8**	**30**	**302**	**10.1**	**37**	2	**1**	0
2001	CLE	12	5	14	86	6.1	12	0	0	0
2002	CLE	7	3	7	49	7.0	18	0	0	0
2003	CLE	4	2	2	9	4.5	7	0	0	0
2004	CLE	**15**	**8**	26	252	9.7	35	**4**	0	0
2005	CLE	12	4	18	153	8.5	27	1	0	0
Career		65	30	97	851	8.8	37	7	1	0

== Retirement ==
In June 2007, The Plain Dealer reported Shea was receiving interest from his former team, the Cleveland Browns. However, Shea remained unsigned as the 2007 season began.

In May 2008, Shea officially retired from the NFL.

He worked for the Browns from 2011 to 2014, and later became an insurance agent.

== Personal life ==
Shea married the former Caitlin Gibbons in Cleveland on June 21, 2003. They have two daughters, Cadence and Ireland and one son Kinzy.

Shea and his family were involved in a minor car accident on Route 430 in the town of Ellery, New York, near Chautauqua Lake on July 6, 2010. All five members of the Shea family escaped injury.
