= Sedrick Irvin =

American football player and coach (born 1978)

No. 33
- Position: Running back

Personal information
- Born: March 30, 1978 (age 48); Miami, Florida, U.S.
- Listed height: 5 ft 11 in (1.80 m)
- Listed weight: 226 lb (103 kg)

Career information
- High school: Miami Southridge
- College: Michigan State
- NFL draft: 1999: 4th round, 103rd overall pick

Career history

Playing
- Detroit Lions (1999–2001); Miami Dolphins (2003)*; Berlin Thunder (2003); Columbus Destroyers (2005)
- * Offseason or practice squad member only

Coaching
- Gulliver Prep (2006–2008); Alabama (2008–2009); Memphis (2010–2011); Westminster Christian (2011–2016); East Carolina (2016); Miami Senior HS (2016–2017); Miami Southridge Senior HS (2018–2019); Gulliver Prep (2019–2022); Raw 7v7 (2022–present)

Awards and highlights
- 2× Second-team All-Big Ten (1997, 1998)

Career NFL statistics
- Games played: 20
- Games started: 0
- Rushing attempts–yards: 45–182
- Receptions–yards: 33–323
- Touchdowns: 4
- Stats at Pro Football Reference

Sedrick Irvin (born March 30, 1978) is an American football coach and former player. He is the head coach at Raw 7v7. Irvin was the head football coach at Miami Senior High School and Westminster Christian School in Palmetto Bay, Florida. Irvin played college football at Michigan State University and professionally in the National Football League (NFL) with the Detroit Lions.

== Early life ==
Irvin played high school football at Miami Southridge Senior High School and Miami Senior High School, where he was named a USA Today All-American in 1995. He played college football at Michigan State where he was well known for his jukes and stutter steps en route to 1,000 yard rushing seasons in each of his three seasons there. His sophomore season, in 1997, he ran for 1,211 yards on 231 carries and scored 9 touchdowns. As a junior in 1998, he ran for 1,167 yards on 272 carries and scored 10 touchdowns.

Irvin left Michigan State after his junior season with the fourth most rushing yards in school history to enter the National Football League Draft.

== Professional playing career ==
Irvin fell to the fourth round in the 1999 NFL draft due to scouts citing that he was too slow for the NFL game. He led the Detroit Lions in touchdowns his rookie year while backing up James Stewart. After two years in which he was beset by injuries, the Lions let Irvin go. He signed with the Miami Dolphins in hopes of returning to the NFL, but never saw game time. He also played in NFL Europe and the Arena Football League where he played linebacker and fullback, both positions new to him.

== Coaching career ==
Irvin was an assistant coach at Gulliver Preparatory School in Miami. From 2008 to 2009, he worked under head coach Nick Saban at the University of Alabama. During his acceptance speech for the Heisman Trophy, Alabama running back Mark Ingram II thanked Irvin for helping him throughout his college career. On January 14, 2010, Irvin was named the running backs coach for the Memphis Tigers

On March 6, 2011, he was hired as the new head football coach for Westminster Christian School. In April 2016, Sedrick Irvin was hired to the East Carolina University coaching staff.

== Personal life ==
Sedrick Irvin is married with two sons. Irvin is the cousin of former Dallas Cowboys wide receiver and Pro Football Hall of Famer Michael Irvin.
