= 1999 Michigan Wolverines football team =

American college football season

1999 Michigan Wolverines football

Orange Bowl champion

Orange Bowl, W 35–34 ^{OT} vs. Alabama
- Conference: Big Ten Conference

Ranking
- Coaches: No. 5
- AP: No. 5
- Record: 10–2 (6–2 Big Ten)
- Head coach: Lloyd Carr (5th season)
- Offensive coordinator: Mike DeBord (3rd season)
- Defensive coordinator: Jim Herrmann (3rd season)
- MVP: Tom Brady
- Captains: Tom Brady; Steve Hutchinson; Rob Renes
- Home stadium: Michigan Stadium

1999 Big Ten Conference football standings
| | Conf. | | | Overall |
| Team | W | | L | W | | L |
|---|---|---|---|---|---|---|
| No. 4 Wisconsin $ | 7 | – | 1 | 10 | – | 2 |
| No. 7 Michigan State | 6 | – | 2 | 10 | – | 2 |
| No. 5 Michigan % | 6 | – | 2 | 10 | – | 2 |
| No. 11 Penn State | 5 | – | 3 | 10 | – | 3 |
| No. 18 Minnesota | 5 | – | 3 | 8 | – | 4 |
| No. 24 Illinois | 4 | – | 4 | 8 | – | 4 |
| No. 25 Purdue | 4 | – | 4 | 7 | – | 5 |
| Ohio State | 3 | – | 5 | 6 | – | 6 |
| Indiana | 3 | – | 5 | 4 | – | 7 |
| Northwestern | 1 | – | 7 | 3 | – | 8 |
| Iowa | 0 | – | 8 | 1 | – | 10 |
$ – BCS representative as conference champion; % – BCS at-large representative; Rankings from AP Poll

The 1999 Michigan Wolverines football team was an American football team that represented the University of Michigan as a member of the Big Ten Conference during the 1999 NCAA Division I-A football season. In their fifth year under head coach Lloyd Carr, the Wolverines compiled a 10–2 record (6–2 against conference opponents), tied for second place in the Big Ten, defeated Alabama in the 2000 Orange Bowl, and were ranked No. 5 in the final AP and coaches polls.

After winning a quarterback competition with Drew Henson, Tom Brady completed 180 of 295 passes for 2,217 yards with 16 touchdowns and six interceptions. At the end of the season, Brady received the team's most valuable player award. Anthony Thomas led the team with 1,257 rushing yards, and David Terrell was the team's leading receiver with 61 receptions for 888 yards.

Two Michigan players received first-team honors on the 1999 All-America college football team: offensive guard Steve Hutchinson (PFW, CNNSI); and defensive tackle Rob Renes (TSN). Six Wolverines received first-team honors on the 1999 All-Big Ten Conference football team: Terrell; Hutchinson; Renes; Jeff Backus at offensive tackle; Ian Gold at linebacker; and Tommy Hendricks at safety.

The team played its home games at Michigan Stadium in Ann Arbor, Michigan. Brady, Renes, and Hutchinson were the team captains.

== Schedule ==
| Date | Time | Opponent | Rank | Site | TV | Result | Attendance | Source |
|---|---|---|---|---|---|---|---|---|
| September 4 | 3:30 p.m. | No. 16 Notre Dame* | No. 7 | Michigan Stadium; Ann Arbor, MI (rivalry) | ABC | W 26–22 | 111,523 | |
| September 11 | 12:10 p.m. | Rice* | No. 6 | Michigan Stadium; Ann Arbor, MI | ESPN2 | W 37–3 | 110,501 | |
| September 18 | 8:00 p.m. | at Syracuse* | No. 6 | Carrier Dome; Syracuse, NY | CBS | W 18–13 | 49,249 | |
| September 25 | 3:30 p.m. | at No. 20 Wisconsin | No. 4 | Camp Randall Stadium; Madison, WI | ABC | W 21–16 | 79,037 | |
| October 2 | 12:10 p.m. | No. 11 Purdue^{†} | No. 4 | Michigan Stadium; Ann Arbor, MI | ESPN | W 38–12 | 111,468 | |
| October 9 | 12:00 p.m. | at No. 11 Michigan State | No. 3 | Spartan Stadium; East Lansing, MI (rivalry) | ABC | L 31–34 | 76,895 | |
| October 23 | 12:10 p.m. | Illinois | No. 9 | Michigan Stadium; Ann Arbor, MI (rivalry) | ESPN Plus | L 29–35 | 110,188 | |
| October 30 | 12:10 p.m. | at Indiana | No. 15 | Memorial Stadium; Bloomington, IN | ESPN2 | W 34–31 | 41,516 | |
| November 6 | 12:10 p.m. | Northwestern | No. 16 | Michigan Stadium; Ann Arbor, MI (rivalry) | ESPN Plus | W 37–3 | 110,794 | |
| November 13 | 12:00 p.m. | at No. 6 Penn State | No. 16 | Beaver Stadium; University Park, PA (rivalry) | ABC | W 31–27 | 96,840 | |
| November 20 | 12:00 p.m. | Ohio State | No. 10 | Michigan Stadium; Ann Arbor, MI (The Game) | ABC | W 24–17 | 111,575 | |
| January 1, 2000 | 8:30 p.m. | vs. No. 5 Alabama* | No. 8 | Pro Player Stadium; Miami Gardens, FL (Orange Bowl) | ABC | W 35–34 ^{OT} | 70,461 | |
*Non-conference game; ^{†}Homecoming; Rankings from AP Poll released prior to the game; All times are in Eastern time

== Game summaries ==
=== Notre Dame ===
Notre Dame at Michigan

| Team | 1 | 2 | 3 | 4 | Total |
|---|---|---|---|---|---|
| No. 16 Notre Dame | 0 | 14 | 0 | 8 | 22 |
| • No. 8 Michigan | 6 | 3 | 10 | 7 | 26 |

- Date: September 4
- Location: Michigan Stadium
- Game attendance: 111,523
- TV announcers (ABC): Brent Musburger, Dan Fouts, Jack Arute

Scoring summary
| 1 | 8:39 | MICH | Jeff Del Verne 21-yard field goal | MICH 3–0 |
| 1 | 2:36 | MICH | Del Verne 35-yard field goal | MICH 6–0 |
| 2 | 14:09 | ND | Joey Getherall 4-yard run (Jim Sanson kick) | ND 7–6 |
| 2 | 8:04 | MICH | Del Verne 37-yard field goal | MICH 9–7 |
| 2 | 0:51 | ND | Jarious Jackson 12-yard run (Sanson kick) | ND 14–9 |
| 3 | 11:52 | MICH | Anthony Thomas 2-yard run (Del Verne kick) | MICH 16–14 |
| 3 | 2:41 | MICH | Del Verne 27-yard field goal | MICH 19–14 |
| 4 | 4:08 | ND | Jabari Holloway 20-yard pass from Jackson (Jackson pass to Bobby Brown) | ND 22–19 |
| 4 | 1:38 | MICH | Thomas 1-yard run (Del Verne kick) | MICH 26–22 |

On September 4, Michigan defeated Notre Dame, 26–22, before a crowd of 111,523 at Michigan Stadium. Michigan took a 6–0 lead in the first quarter on two field goals by Jeff Del Verne, capping drives of 54 and 38 yards. The second field goal was set up by a Notre Dame fumble at the Michigan 44-yard line.

Early in the second quarter, Notre Dame took a 7–6 lead on four-yard run by Joey Getherall. Michigan retook the lead with a 59-yard drive led by Drew Henson and capped by another field goal from Del Verne. The Fighting Irish then scored on a 12-yard touchdown run by quarterback Jarious Jackson with 51 seconds remaining in the first half. Notre Dame led, 14–9, at halftime.

At the start of the third quarter, Tom Brady led Michigan on an 80-yard touchdown drive, ending with a two-yard touchdown run by Anthony Thomas. Michigan added a fourth Del Verne field goal late in the third quarter and led, 19–14, at the end of three quarters.

Late in the fourth quarter, Jackson led Notre Dame on a 65-yard drive ending with a 20-yard pass from Jackson to a wide open Jabari Holloway, on fourth-and-inches and with 4:08 remaining. The Irish then converted a two-point conversion on a pass from Jackson to Bobby Brown. With the clock running down, Michigan drove 58 yards on seven plays, aided by two key penalties against Notre Dame—one for excessive celebration after Holloway's touchdown and a late hit penalty. Michigan scored the winning touchdown on a one-yard run by Anthony Thomas with 1:38 remaining on the clock.In the final minute-and-a-half, Jackson led the Irish to Michigan's 12-yard line before time expired.

The game continued the quarterback competition between fifth-year senior Tom Brady and sophomore Drew Henson. Brady completed 17 of 24 passes for 197 yards, and Henson completed three of eight passes for 40 yards. Anthony Thomas rushed for 138 yards and two touchdowns on 32 carries. David Terrell caught eight passes for 115 yards. After the game, head coach Lloyd Carr said, "I like them both."

Kicker Jeff Del Verne, a walk-on from Sylvania, Ohio. was granted a scholarship after his 15-point performance against Notre Dame.

| Statistics | ND | UM |
|---|---|---|
| First downs | 20 | 21 |
| Plays–yards | 67–398 | 69–361 |
| Rushes–yards | 38–96 | 37–124 |
| Passing yards | 302 | 236 |
| Passing: comp–att–int | 18-29-1 | 20–32–0 |
| Turnovers | | |
| Time of possession | 29:15 | 30:45 |

| Team | Category | Player | Statistics |
|---|---|---|---|
| Notre Dame | Passing | Jarious Jackson | 18/29, 302 yards, 1 TD, 1 INT |
| Notre Dame | Rushing | Fisher | 12 carries, 75 yards |
| Notre Dame | Receiving | Nelson | 5 receptions, 91 yards |
| Michigan | Passing | Tom Brady | 17/24, 197 yards |
| Michigan | Rushing | Anthony Thomas | 32 carries, 138 yards, 2 TD |
| Michigan | Receiving | David Terrell | 8 receptions, 115 yards |

=== Rice ===
Rice at Michigan

| Team | 1 | 2 | 3 | 4 | Total |
|---|---|---|---|---|---|
| Rice | 0 | 0 | 0 | 3 | 3 |
| • No. 6 Michigan | 3 | 17 | 14 | 3 | 37 |

- Date: September 11
- Location: Michigan Stadium
- Game attendance: 110,501
- TV announcers (ESPN2): Gino Torretta, Rich Waltz

Scoring summary
| 1 | 2:48 | MICH | Jeff Del Verne 24-yard field goal | MICH 3–0 |
| 2 | 12:46 | MICH | Drew Henson 1-yard run (Del Verne kick) | MICH 10–0 |
| 2 | 6:20 | MICH | Del Verne 38-yard field goal | MICH 13–0 |
| 2 | 1:34 | MICH | David Terrell 14-yard pass from Henson (Del Verne kick) | MICH 20–0 |
| 3 | 9:04 | MICH | Anthony Thomas 11-yard run (Del Verne kick) | MICH 27–0 |
| 3 | 4:46 | MICH | Thomas 4-yard run (Del Verne kick) | MICH 34–0 |
| 4 | 14:58 | MICH | Del Verne 30-yard field goal | MICH 37–0 |
| 4 | 0:30 | RICE | Derek Crabtree 33-yard field goal | MICH 37–3 |

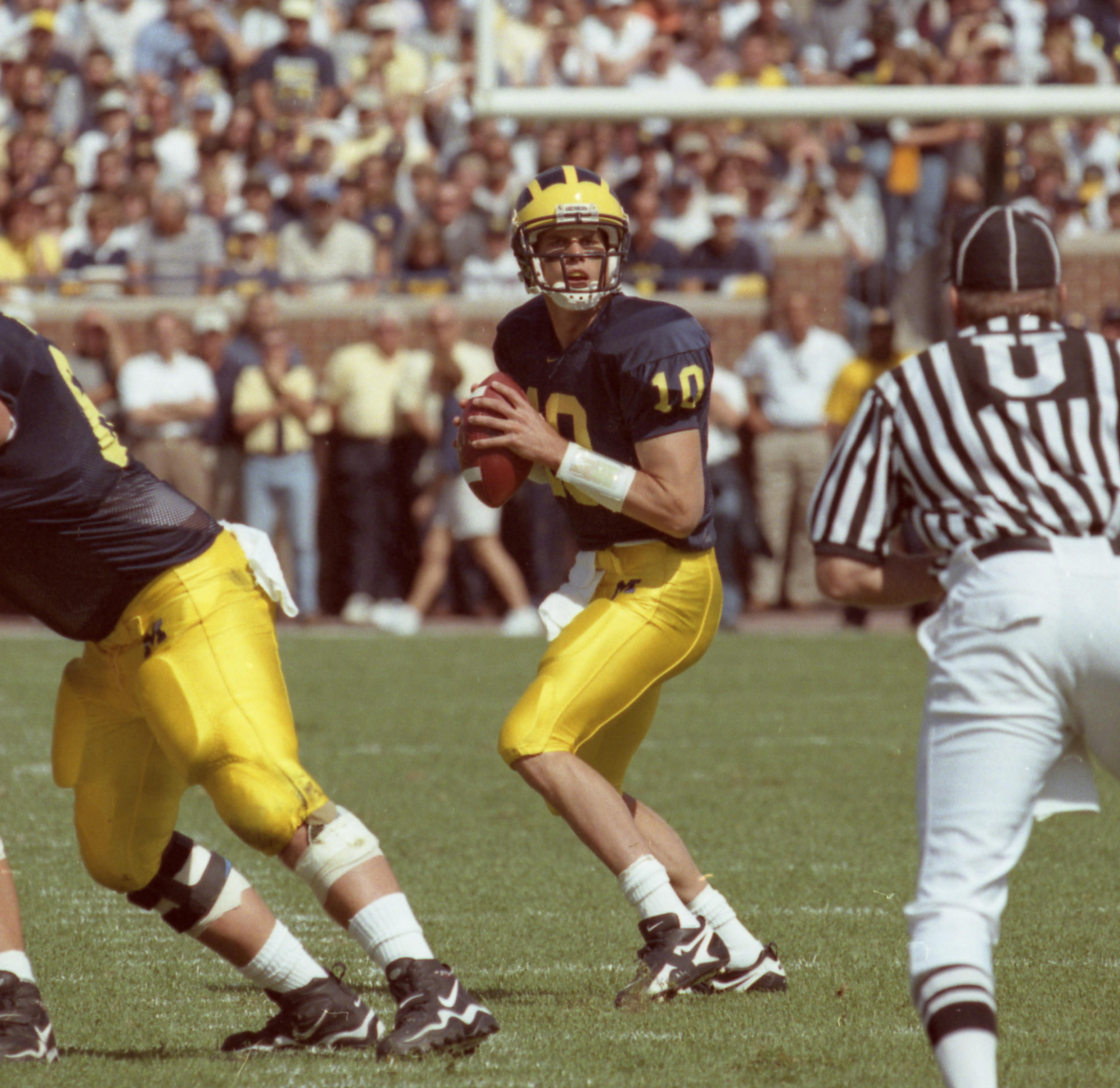
Tom Brady in action v Rice

On September 11, Michigan defeated Rice, 37–3, before a crowd of 110,501 at Michigan Stadium. Tom Brady led Michigan on a 58-yard drive late in the first quarter, ending with a 24-yard field goal by Jeff Del Verne. In the second quarter, Drew Henson led the Wolverines on a 64-yard drive, starting with a 34-yard pass to David Terrell and ending with Henson sneaking across for the touchdown from the one-yard line. At the end of the second quarter, Henson led Michigan on a 53-yard scoring drive ending with a 14-yard touchdown pass from Henson to Terrell. Michigan led, 20–0, at halftime.

The Wolverines extended their lead in the third quarter on a pair of touchdown runs by Anthony Thomas. Thomas' first touchdown, an 11-yard run, was set up by Josh Williams' recovery of a Rice fumble at the Rice 46-yard line. The second touchdown, a four-yard run, was set up by Marquise Walker's block of a Rice punt, recovered and returned by Brandon Williams to the Rice four-yard line. The teams traded field goals in the fourth quarter, Rice finally scoring with 30 seconds remaining in the game.

Michigan's defense held Rice to 157 yards of total offense and did not allow the Owls to cross midfield until the fourth quarter. Quarterbacks Brady and Henson both played well with Brady playing most of the first and third quarters and Henson the entire second quarter and most of the fourth quarter. Brady completed 10 of 15 passes for 59 yards, and Henson completed eight of 14 passes for 109 yards and a touchdown. The team scored 20 points under Henson and 17 points under Brady. Third-string quarterback Jason Kapsner finished the game for Michigan.

| Statistics | Rice | UM |
|---|---|---|
| First downs | 8 | 19 |
| Plays–yards | 56–157 | 72–356 |
| Rushes–yards | 52–142 | 41–132 |
| Passing yards | 15 | 224 |
| Passing: comp–att–int | 1-4-2 | 18–31–0 |
| Turnovers | | |
| Time of possession | 33:30 | 26:30 |

| Team | Category | Player | Statistics |
|---|---|---|---|
| Rice | Passing | Chad Richardson | 1/3, 15 yards, 2 INT |
| Rice | Rushing | Corey Evans | 10 carries, 72 yards |
| Rice | Receiving | Raphael Tillman | 1 reception, 15 yards |
| Michigan | Passing | Tom Brady | 10/15, 115 yards |
| Michigan | Rushing | Anthony Thomas | 21 carries, 87 yards, 2 TD |
| Michigan | Receiving | David Terrell | 4 receptions, 62 yards, 1 TD |

=== Syracuse ===
Michigan at Syracuse

| Team | 1 | 2 | 3 | 4 | Total |
|---|---|---|---|---|---|
| • No. 6 Michigan | 0 | 13 | 2 | 3 | 18 |
| Syracuse | 0 | 7 | 6 | 0 | 13 |

- Date: September 19
- Location: Carrier Dome
- Game attendance: 49,249
- TV announcers (CBS): Craig Bolerjack, Ed Cunningham

Scoring summary
| 2 | 11:13 | MICH | Jeff Del Verne 41-yard field goal | MICH 3–0 |
| 2 | 7:59 | MICH | Del Verne 24-yard field goal | MICH 6–0 |
| 2 | 4:07 | SYR | Quinton Spotwood 6-yard pass from Madei Williams (Nathan Trout kick) | SYR 7–6 |
| 2 | 0:54 | MICH | Aaron Shea 22-yard pass from Drew Henson (Del Verne kick) | MICH 13–7 |
| 3 | 10:45 | SYR | James Mungro 3-yard pass from Troy Nunes (kick blocked) | TIE 13–13 |
| 3 | 4:57 | MICH | Syracuse intentional grounding for safety | MICH 15–13 |
| 4 | 3:43 | MICH | Del Verne 31-yard field goal | MICH 18–13 |

On September 18, Michigan defeated Syracuse, 18–13, at the Carrier Dome in Syracuse, New York. Syracuse had defeated Michigan one year earlier in Ann Arbor.

Neither team scored in the first quarter, as Syracuse was held to minus-17 yards and Michigan had a field goal attempt blocked. Drew Henson played well in the second quarter, completing nine of 14 passes for 117 yards, including a 22-yard touchdown pass to Aaron Shea. Jeff Del Verne added two field goals in the second quarter, and Michigan led, 13–7, at halftime.

Michigan's offense sputtered in the second half as the Wolverines were limited to 64 yards of offense. Michigan's only offensive points in the second half came on a 31-yard field goal by Jeff Del Verne late in the fourth quarter. Michigan also registered two points on a safety in the third quarter when Syracuse quarterback Troy Nunes was penalized for intentional grounding in the end zone. In the closing minutes, quarterback Madei Williams led a Syracuse drive to the Michigan eight-yard line. On fourth and four, Williams threw to Pat Woodcock in the end zone; the pass fell incomplete, though replays appeared to show that Michigan defensive back James Whitley had committed pass interference on the play. The penalty was not called, and Michigan took over on downs with two minutes remaining and was able to run out the clock.

The quarterback competition between Brady and Henson remained a focus of the press. Henson played three quarters in the game, completing 16 of 28 passes for 151 yards, one touchdown, and one interception (the first turnover of the season by Michigan). After the game, Henson commented on the extended playing time: "It's the position I've wanted to be in for years. I got my chance tonight." Brady added: "There's certainly no bitterness or jealousy. . . . We continue to compete. We thrive on one another. That's the way it works."

| Statistics | UM | SU |
|---|---|---|
| First downs | 19 | 15 |
| Plays–yards | 74–298 | 64–249 |
| Rushes–yards | 36–121 | 34–49 |
| Passing yards | 171 | 200 |
| Passing: comp–att–int | 21-38-1 | 13–30–2 |
| Turnovers | | |
| Time of possession | 28:44 | 31:16 |

| Team | Category | Player | Statistics |
|---|---|---|---|
| Michigan | Passing | Drew Henson | 16/28, 151 yards, 1 INT |
| Michigan | Rushing | Anthony Thomas | 26 carries, 97 yards |
| Michigan | Receiving | David Terrell | 7 receptions, 110 yards |
| Syracuse | Passing | Troy Nunes | 6/18, 72 yards, 2 INT |
| Syracuse | Rushing | Dee Brown | 12 carries, 37 yards |
| Syracuse | Receiving | Pat Woodcock | 8 receptions, 65 yards |

=== Wisconsin ===
Michigan at Wisconsin

| Team | 1 | 2 | 3 | 4 | Total |
|---|---|---|---|---|---|
| • No. 4 Michigan | 14 | 0 | 7 | 0 | 21 |
| No. 20 Wisconsin | 0 | 9 | 0 | 7 | 16 |

- Date: September 25
- Location: Camp Randall Stadium
- Game attendance: 79,037
- TV announcers (ABC): Brent Musburger, Gary Danielson

Scoring summary
| 1 | 7:16 | MICH | Aaron Shea 8-yard pass from Tom Brady (Jeff Del Verne kick) | MICH 7–0 |
| 1 | 1:19 | MICH | David Terrell 45-yard run on triple reverse (Del Verne kick) | MICH 14–0 |
| 2 | 11:17 | WISC | Vitaly Pisetsky 32-yard field goal | MICH 14–3 |
| 2 | 3:27 | WISC | Ron Dayne 34-yard run (kick failed) | MICH 14–9 |
| 3 | 1:02 | MICH | DiAllo Johnson 27-yard pass from Brady (Del Verne kick) | MICH 21–9 |
| 4 | 1:29 | WISC | Brooks Bollinger 14-yard run (Pisetsky kick) | MICH 21–16 |

On September 25, Michigan defeated Wisconsin, 21–16, before a crowd of 79,037 at Camp Randall Stadium in Madison, Wisconsin. Michigan dominated the first quarter, holding Wisconsin scoreless while Tom Brady led Michigan on two scoring drives. Michigan's first scoring drive ended with an eight-yard touchdown pass from Brady to Aaron Shea. After Ron Dayne fumbled, Michigan recovered the loose ball at the Wisconsin 45-yard line. Davide Terrell the ran 45 yards for the touchdown on a double reverse. Wisconsin took over in the second quarter with a 32-yard field goal and a 34-yard touchdown run by Dayne. Michigan blocked the extra point kick and led, 14–9, at halftime.

Late in the third quarter, Michigan extended its lead to 21–9 on a 27-yard touchdown pass from Brady to DiAllo Johnson. With 1:02 remaining in the game, Brooks Bollinger ran 14 yards for a touchdown. Wisconsin attempted an onside kick, but Anthony Thomas recovered the bouncing ball, and Michigan ran out the clock.

Michigan's defense held 1999 Heisman Trophy winner Ron Dayne to zero rushing yards in the second half. Tom Brady completed 17 of 27 passes for 217 yards and two touchdowns.

=== Purdue ===
Purdue at Michigan

| Team | 1 | 2 | 3 | 4 | Total |
|---|---|---|---|---|---|
| No. 11 Purdue | 3 | 3 | 6 | 0 | 12 |
| • No. 4 Michigan | 14 | 7 | 7 | 10 | 38 |

- Date: October 2
- Location: Michigan Stadium
- Game attendance: 111,468

Scoring summary
| 1 | 12:20 | PUR | Travis Dorsch 28-yard field goal | PUR 3–0 |
| 1 | 10:18 | MICH | David Terrell 18-yard pass from Tom Brady (Jeff Del Verne kick) | MICH 7–3 |
| 1 | 5:51 | MICH | Marcus Knight 17-yard pass from Brady (Del Verne kick) | MICH 14–3 |
| 2 | 6:57 | MICH | Anthony Thomas 1-yard run (Del Verne kick) | MICH 21–3 |
| 2 | 0:21 | PUR | Dorsch 31-yard field goal | MICH 21–6 |
| 3 | 8:24 | PUR | Vinny Sutherland 66-yard pass from Drew Brees (conversion failed) | MICH 21–12 |
| 3 | 4:14 | MICH | Thomas 5-yard run (Del Verne kick) | MICH 28–12 |
| 4 | 9:11 | MICH | B.J. Askew 10-yard run (Del Verne kick) | MICH 35–12 |
| 4 | 4:27 | MICH | Del Verne 24-yard field goal | MICH 38–12 |

On October 2, Michigan defeated Purdue, 38–12, before a crowd of 111,468 at Michigan Stadium.

In the first quarter, Tom Brady completed nine of 14 passes for 132 yards and two touchdowns – an 18-yard strike to David Terrell and a 17-yarder to Marcus Knight. Drew Henson took over at quarterback in the second quarter and led Michigan 63 yards on his first drive, ending with a one-yard touchdown run by Anthony Thomas. Late in the second quarter, Thomas fumbled, and Purdue recovered deep in Michigan territory. Michigan's defense held, and Purdue settled for another field goal by Dorsch with 21 seconds remaining in the half. Michigan totaled 272 yards in the first half and led, 21–6, at halftime.

Midway through the second quarter, Purdue scored its only touchdown of the game, as Brees connected with Vinny Sutherland for a 66-yard touchdown. After the long strike by Brees, Michigan's defense shut down Purdue's offense, and Michigan added to its lead with touchdown runs by Thomas and B. J. Askew and a 24-yard field goal by Jeff Del Verne.

The game featured a quarterback matchup between Brees, considered a leading candidate for the Heisman Trophy, and Brady, still fighting to keep his job as Michigan's starting quarterback. Brees completed 20 of 49 passes for 293 yards with one touchdown and one interception. Brady completed 15 of 25 passes for 250 yards and two touchdowns. After the game, The Michigan Daily ran a headline, "Drew who? Brady shows up Brees".

David Terrell played on both offense as a wide receiver and on defense as a defensive back. Thomas rushed for 116 yards and two touchdowns on 23 carries.

| Statistics | PUR | UM |
|---|---|---|
| First downs | 10 | 23 |
| Plays–yards | 80–396 | 75–489 |
| Rushes–yards | 28–68 | 47–171 |
| Passing yards | 328 | 318 |
| Passing: comp–att–int | 21-52-1 | 18–28–0 |
| Turnovers | | |
| Time of possession | 27:34 | 32:26 |

| Team | Category | Player | Statistics |
|---|---|---|---|
| Purdue | Passing | Drew Brees | 20/49, 293 yards, 1 TD, 1 INT |
| Purdue | Rushing | Montrell Lowe | 10 carries, 44 yards |
| Purdue | Receiving | Randall Lane | 3 receptions, 77 yards |
| Michigan | Passing | Tom Brady | 15/25, 250 yards, 2 TD |
| Michigan | Rushing | Anthony Thomas | 23 carries, 116 yards, 2 TD |
| Michigan | Receiving | Marcus Knight | 4 receptions, 136 yards, 1 TD |

=== Michigan State ===
Michigan at Michigan State

| Team | 1 | 2 | 3 | 4 | Total |
|---|---|---|---|---|---|
| No. 3 Michigan | 0 | 10 | 0 | 21 | 31 |
| • No. 11 Michigan State | 7 | 6 | 14 | 7 | 34 |

- Date: October 9
- Location: Spartan Stadium
- Game attendance: 76,895
- TV announcers (ABC): Tim Brant, Mike Golic

Scoring summary
| 1 | 6:55 | MSU | T.J. Duckett 1-yard run (Paul Edinger kick) | MSU 7–0 |
| 2 | 14:55 | MICH | Hayden Epstein 56-yard field goal | MSU 7–3 |
| 2 | 5:28 | MSU | Edinger 39-yard field goal | MSU 10–3 |
| 2 | 3:39 | MICH | Marcus Knight 81-yard pass from Drew Henson (Del Verne kick) | TIE 10–10 |
| 2 | 1:17 | MSU | Edinger 43-yard field goal | MSU 13–10 |
| 3 | 6:15 | MSU | Gari Scott 19-yard pass from Burke (Edinger kick) | MSU 20–10 |
| 3 | 3:02 | MSU | Plaxico Burress 15-yard pass from Burke (Edinger kick) | MSU 27–10 |
| 4 | 14:23 | MICH | Anthony Thomas 2-yard run (Del Verne kick) | MSU 27–17 |
| 4 | 12:19 | MSU | Dawan Moss 14-yard run (Edinger kick) | MSU 34–17 |
| 4 | 8:11 | MICH | David Terrell 19-yard pass from Tom Brady (Del Verne kick) | MSU 34–24 |
| 4 | 2:47 | MICH | Aaron Shea 8-yard pass from Brady (Del Verne kick) | MSU 34–31 |

=== Illinois ===
Illinois at Michigan

| Team | 1 | 2 | 3 | 4 | Total |
|---|---|---|---|---|---|
| • Illinois | 7 | 0 | 7 | 21 | 35 |
| No. 9 Michigan | 7 | 13 | 7 | 2 | 29 |

- Date: October 23
- Location: Michigan Stadium
- Game attendance: 110,188

Scoring summary
| 1 | 6:00 | ILL | Jameel Cook 6-yard pass from Kurt Kittner (Neil Rackers kick) | ILL 7–0 |
| 1 | 1:43 | MICH | Marquise Walker 6-yard pass from Tom Brady (Jeff Del Verne kick) | TIE 7–7 |
| 2 | 9:14 | MICH | Marcus Knight 31-yard pass from Brady (Del Verne kick) | MICH 14–7 |
| 2 | 6:24 | MICH | Anthony Thomas run (kick failed) | MICH 20–7 |
| 3 | 6:01 | MICH | Thomas 1-yard run (Hayden Epstein kick) | MICH 27–7 |
| 3 | 2:41 | ILL | Walter Young 31-yard pass from Kittner (Rackers kick) | MICH 27–14 |
| 4 | 6:25 | ILL | Brian Hodges 3-yard pass from Kittner (Rackers kick) | MICH 27–21 |
| 4 | 2:42 | ILL | Rocky Harvey 59-yard pass from Kittner (Rackers kick) | ILL 28–27 |
| 4 | 0:59 | ILL | Harvey 54-yard run (Rackers kick) | ILL 35–27 |
| 4 | 0:09 | MICH | Team safety | ILL 35–29 |

On October 23, Michigan lost to Illinois, 35–29, before a crowd of 110,188 at Michigan Stadium. Michigan led, 27–7, late in the third quarter, but Illinois scored 28 unanswered points in the last 18 minutes of the game, including 21 points in the last six-and-a-half minutes. After the game, coach Carr said, "We played as poorly defensively as you can play and suffered the consequences. We're certainly anything but good." Tom Brady completed 23 of 38 passes for 307 yards with two touchdowns and two interceptions. In assessing the loss, The Michigan Daily found much to blame, including Carr's conservative play-calling, a bad snap by Steve Frazier with 1:48 to play, and "the complete collapse by Michigan's defense."

| Statistics | UI | UM |
|---|---|---|
| First downs | 21 | 27 |
| Plays–yards | 66–437 | 83–425 |
| Rushes–yards | 33–157 | 42–110 |
| Passing yards | 280 | 315 |
| Passing: comp–att–int | 24-33-0 | 25–41–2 |
| Turnovers | | |
| Time of possession | 28:36 | 31:24 |

| Team | Category | Player | Statistics |
|---|---|---|---|
| Illinois | Passing | Kurt Kittner | 24/33, 280 yards, 4 TD |
| Illinois | Rushing | Rocky Harvey | 17 carries, 106 yards, 1 TD |
| Illinois | Receiving | Rocky Harvey | 2 receptions, 61 yards, 1 TD |
| Michigan | Passing | Tom Brady | 23/38, 307 yards, 2 TD, 2 INT |
| Michigan | Rushing | Anthony Thomas | 21 carries, 128 yards, 2 TD |
| Michigan | Receiving | Marcus Knight | 7 receptions, 135 yards, 1 TD |

=== Indiana ===
Michigan at Indiana

| Team | 1 | 2 | 3 | 4 | Total |
|---|---|---|---|---|---|
| • No. 15 Michigan | 10 | 7 | 0 | 17 | 34 |
| Indiana | 0 | 10 | 0 | 21 | 31 |

- Date: October 30
- Location: Bloomington, IN
- Game attendance: 41,516

Scoring summary
| 1 | 11:34 | MICH | Anthony Thomas 1-yard run (Hayden Epstein kick) | MICH 3–0 |
| 1 | 7:11 | MICH | Epstein 22-yard field goal | MICH 10–0 |
| 2 | 7:44 | MICH | Thomas 15-yard run (Epstein kick) | MICH 17–0 |
| 2 | 4:23 | IND | Kris Dielman 7-yard pass from Antwaan Randle El (Andy Payne kick) | MICH 17–7 |
| 2 | 0:00 | IND | Payne 23yard field goal | MICH 17–10 |
| 4 | 13:20 | IND | Jeremi Johnson 1-yard pass from Randle El (Payne kick) | TIE 17–17 |
| 4 | 12:06 | IND | Jerry Dorsey 4-yard pass from Randle El (Payne kick) | IND 24–17 |
| 4 | 10:54 | MICH | Bennie Jopru 7-yard pass from Tom Brady (Epstein kick) | TIE 24–24 |
| 4 | 6:27 | MICH | Thomas 4-yard run (Epstein kick) | MICH 31–24 |
| 4 | 4:59 | IND | Jerry Dorsey 70-yard pass from Randle El (Payne kick) | TIE 31–31 |
| 4 | 0:18 | MICH | Epstein 20-yard field goal | MICH 34–31 |

=== Northwestern ===
Northwestern at Michigan

| Team | 1 | 2 | 3 | 4 | Total |
|---|---|---|---|---|---|
| Northwestern | 0 | 0 | 3 | 0 | 3 |
| • No. 16 Michigan | 6 | 21 | 7 | 3 | 37 |

- Date: November 6
- Location: Michigan Stadium
- Game attendance: 110,794
- TV announcers (ESPN Plus): Randy Wright

Scoring summary
| 1 | 3:21 | MICH | David Terrell 26-yard pass from Tom Brady (kick failed) | MICH 6–0 |
| 2 | 11:40 | MICH | Marcus Knight 45-yard pass from Brady (Hayden Epstein kick) | MICH 13–0 |
| 2 | 5:46 | MICH | Anthony Thomas 60-yard run (Epstein kick) | MICH 20–0 |
| 2 | 0:48 | MICH | Thomas 1-yard run (Epstein kick) | MICH 27–0 |
| 3 | 13:08 | MICH | Bennie Joppru 11-yard pass from Brady | MICH 34–0 |
| 3 | 4:06 | NW | Tim Long 37-yard field goal | MICH 34–3 |
| 4 | 0:33 | MICH | Brandon Kornblue 26-yard field goal | MICH 37–3 |

On November 6, Michigan defeated Northwestern, 37–3, before a crowd of 110,794 at Michigan Stadium. Michigan dominated the first half, taking a 27–0 lead at halftime. Tom Brady completed 12 of 23 passes for 185 yards and three touchdowns by David Terrell for 26 yards in the first quarter, Marcus Knight for 45 yards in the second quarter, and Bennie Joppru for 11 yards in the third quarter. Anthony Thomas also rushed for 172 yards on 17 carries and two touchdowns, including a 60-yard touchdown run in the second quarter. On defense, the Wolverines held the Wildcats to 200 yards of total offense. Terrell also had an interception while playing on defense.

| Statistics | NW | UM |
|---|---|---|
| First downs | 12 | 23 |
| Plays–yards | 67–200 | 81–449 |
| Rushes–yards | 38–121 | 42–223 |
| Passing yards | 79 | 226 |
| Passing: comp–att–int | 11-29-1 | 17–39–0 |
| Turnovers | | |
| Time of possession | 28:06 | 31:54 |

| Team | Category | Player | Statistics |
|---|---|---|---|
| Northwestern | Passing | Zak Kustok | 8/21, 51 yards, 1 INT |
| Northwestern | Rushing | Damien Anderson | 21 carries, 74 yards |
| Northwestern | Receiving | Derrick Thompson | 4 receptions, 41 yards |
| Michigan | Passing | Tom Brady | 12/23, 185 yards, 3 TD |
| Michigan | Rushing | Anthony Thomas | 17 carries, 172 yards, 2 TD |
| Michigan | Receiving | David Terrell | 5 receptions, 71 yards, 1 TD |

=== Penn State ===
Michigan at Penn State

| Team | 1 | 2 | 3 | 4 | Total |
|---|---|---|---|---|---|
| • No. 16 Michigan | 10 | 0 | 7 | 14 | 31 |
| No. 6 Penn State | 0 | 7 | 10 | 10 | 27 |

- Date: November 14
- Location: Beaver Stadium
- Game attendance: 96,840
- TV announcers (ABC): Brent Musburger, Gary Danielson

Scoring summary
| 1 | 12:42 | MICH | Hayden Epstein 33-yard field goal | MICH 3–0 |
| 1 | 8:15 | MICH | Anthony Thomas 2-yard run (Epstein kick) | MICH 10–0 |
| 2 | 9:28 | PSU | Bruce Branch 79-yard punt return (Forney kick) | MICH 10–7 |
| 3 | | MICH | Marcus Knight 35-yard pass from Tom Brady (Epstein kick) | MICH 17–7 |
| 3 | 6:09 | PSU | Forney 39-yard field goal | MICH 17–10 |
| 3 | 2:09 | PSU | Eddie Drummond 38-yard pass from Kevin Thompson (Forney kick) | TIE 17–17 |
| 4 | 11:59 | PSU | Forney 28-yard field goal | PSU 20–17 |
| 4 | 9:44 | PSU | Bhawoh Jue 46-yard interception return (Forney kick) | PSU 27–17 |
| 4 | 3:26 | MICH | Brady 3-yard run (Epstein kick) | PSU 27–24 |
| 4 | 1:46 | MICH | Knight 11-yard pass from Brady (Epstein kick) | MICH 31–27 |

=== Ohio State ===
Ohio State at Michigan

| Team | 1 | 2 | 3 | 4 | Total |
|---|---|---|---|---|---|
| Ohio State | 7 | 7 | 3 | 0 | 17 |
| • No. 16 Michigan | 0 | 7 | 10 | 7 | 24 |

- Date: November 20
- Location: Michigan Stadium
- Game attendance: 111,575
- TV announcers (ABC): Brent Musburger, Gary Danielson

Scoring summary
| 1 | 5:33 | OHIO | Kevin Houser 6-yard pass from Steve Bellisari (Dan Stultz kick) | OHIO 7–0 |
| 2 | 7:45 | MICH | Anthony Thomas 1-yard run (Hayden Epstein kick) | TIE 7–7 |
| 2 | 3:44 | OHIO | Jamar Martin 1-yard pass from Bellisari (Stultz kick) | OHIO 14–7 |
| 3 | 11:22 | MICH | Epstein 42-yard field goal | Ohio 14–10 |
| 3 | 8:13 | OHIO | Stultz 27-yard field goal | OHIO 17–10 |
| 3 | 0:37 | MICH | Shawn Thompson 8-yard pass from Tom Brady (Epstein kick) | TIE 17–17 |
| 4 | 5:01 | MICH | Marquise Walker 10-yard pass from Brady (Epstein kick) | MICH 24–17 |

On November 20, 1999, Michigan defeated Ohio State, 24–17, before a crowd of 111,575 at Michigan Stadium. Prior to the game, Ohio State was unranked with a 6–5 record, and Michigan was ranked No. 10 with an 8–2 record. The Buckeyes took a 7–0 lead in the first quarter on a six-yard touchdown pass from Steve Bellisari to Kevin Houser. Michigan tied the game in the second quarter on a one-yard touchdown run by Anthony Thomas. The Buckeyes then retook the lead on a one-yard touchdown run by Jamar Martin and led, 14–7, at halftime.

After halftime, the teams traded field goals, and Michigan then tied the game at 17–17 with 37 seconds remaining in the third quarter on an eight-yard touchdown pass from Tom Brady to Shawn Thompson. With five minutes remaining in the game, Michigan scored the game-winning touchdown on a 10-yard pass from Brady to Marquise Walker.

| Statistics | OSU | UM |
|---|---|---|
| First downs | 16 | 19 |
| Plays–yards | 69–368 | 66–252 |
| Rushes–yards | 48–263 | 39–102 |
| Passing yards | 105 | 150 |
| Passing: comp–att–int | 9-21-2 | 17–27–0 |
| Turnovers | | |
| Time of possession | 29:58 | 30:02 |

| Team | Category | Player | Statistics |
|---|---|---|---|
| Ohio State | Passing | Steve Bellisari | 8/20, 84 yards, 2 TD, 2 INT |
| Ohio State | Rushing | Michael Wiley | 22 carries, 92 yards |
| Ohio State | Receiving | Ken-Yon Rambo | 2 receptions, 37 yards |
| Michigan | Passing | Tom Brady | 17/27, 150 yards, 2 TD |
| Michigan | Rushing | Anthony Thomas | 31 carries, 111 yards, 1 TD |
| Michigan | Receiving | Anthony Thomas | 5 receptions, 51 yards |

=== Alabama ===
Michigan vs. Alabama

| Team | 1 | 2 | 3 | 4 | OT | Total |
|---|---|---|---|---|---|---|
| • No. 8 Michigan | 0 | 7 | 21 | 0 | 7 | 35 |
| No. 5 Alabama | 0 | 14 | 14 | 0 | 6 | 34 |

- Date: January 1, 2000
- Location: Pro Player Stadium
- Game attendance: 70,461
- TV announcers (ABC): Brad Nessler, Bob Griese, Lynn Swann

Scoring summary
| 2 | 9:48 | ALA | Shaun Alexander 5-yard run (Ryan Pflugner kick) | ALA 7–0 |
| 2 | 6:51 | ALA | Alexander 6-yard run (Pflugner kick) | ALA 14–0 |
| 2 | 0:58 | MICH | David Terrell 27-yard pass from Tom Brady (Hayden Epstein kick) | ALA 14–7 |
| 3 | 13:03 | MICH | Terrell 57-yard pass from Brady (Epstein kick) | TIE 14–14 |
| 3 | 11:00 | ALA | Alexander 50-yard run (Pflugner kick) | ALA 21–14 |
| 3 | 8:29 | ALA | Freddie Milons 62-yard punt return (Pflugner kick) | ALA 28–14 |
| 3 | 5:42 | MICH | Terrell 20-yard pass from Brady (Epstein kick) | ALA 28–21 |
| 3 | 1:01 | MICH | Anthony Thomas 3-yard run (Epstein kick) | TIE 28–28 |
| OT | | MICH | Shawn Thompson 25-yard pass from Brady (Epstein kick) | MICH 35–28 |
| OT | | ALA | Carter 21-yard pass from Zow (Pflugner kick wide | MICH 35–34 |

On January 1, 2000, Michigan defeated Alabama in overtime by a 35–34 score in the 2000 Orange Bowl at Miami Gardens, Florida. It was the first overtime game in Michigan football history.

Neither team had a first down in the first four drives of the game. Michigan finally converted a first down on a fake punt late in the first quarter, but the first quarter ended in a scoreless tie. On its first possession of the second quarter, Alabama drove 76 yards behind long runs by All-American running back Shaun Alexander. Alexander scored the game's first touchdown on a five-yard run. Alabama's second possession started at Michigan's 31-yard line following a long punt return by Freddie Milons and a late hit penalty against Michigan. Alexander scored on a six-yard run, and Alabama led, 14–0.

With 2:35 remaining in the half, Tom Brady led Michigan on a 45-yard touchdown drive ending with a 27-yard pass from Brady to David Terrell with 54 seconds remaining. Michigan's comeback continued on its opening drive of the second half. Brady connected with Terrell for a 57-yard touchdown pass, and the game was tied at 14–14.

Alabama then responded as Alexander broke multiple tackles and scored on a 50-yard run through the middle of the Michigan defense. After a three-and-out, Michigan was forced to punt, and Milons scored on a 62-yard return. Alabama again led by 14 points midway through the third quarter.

Trailing by 14 points for the second time in the game, Brady led Michigan on a 72-yard drive ending with a 20-yard touchdown pass from Brady to Terrell. It was the third touchdown pass of the game from Brady to Terrell. Michigan drove down the field again on its next possession, Anthony Thomas scoring on a three-yard run with 1:01 remaining in the third quarter. The game was then tied at 28–28.

Michigan drove to the two-yard line early in the fourth quarter, but Thomas fumbled at the goal-line and Alabama recovered the loose ball in the end zone. As time ran out, Alabama blocked a field-goal attempt by Hayden Epstein, and the game went to overtime. On the first play in overtime, Brady threw a 25-yard touchdown pass to Shawn Thompson, and Epstein kicked the extra point. Alabama quarterback Andrew Zow then completed a 21-yard touchdown pass to Antonio Carter, but Ryan Pfluger's kick for the extra point went wide to the right, and Michigan won by the margin of the missed extra point.

In his final collegiate appearance, Tom Brady passed for a college-career-high 369 yards and four touchdowns. Terrell tallied 150 receiving yards and three touchdowns and was selected as the Orange Bowl MVP.

| Statistics | UM | UA |
|---|---|---|
| First downs | 18 | 12 |
| Plays–yards | 70–406 | 57–305 |
| Rushes–yards | 23–27 | 37–184 |
| Passing yards | 369 | 121 |
| Passing: comp–att–int | 35-47-0 | 13–20–0 |
| Turnovers | | |
| Time of possession | 32:08 | 27:52 |

| Team | Category | Player | Statistics |
|---|---|---|---|
| Michigan | Passing | Tom Brady | 34/46, 369 yards, 4 TD |
| Michigan | Rushing | Anthony Thomas | 18 carries, 40 yards, 1 TD |
| Michigan | Receiving | David Terrell | 10 receptions, 150 yards, 3 TD |
| Alabama | Passing | Andrew Zow | 7/14, 86 yards |
| Alabama | Rushing | Shaun Alexander | 25 carries, 161 yards, 3 TD |
| Alabama | Receiving | Antonio Carter | 4 receptions, 38 yards, 1 TD |

== Postseason and awards ==
Michigan was ranked at No. 9 in the polls released at the end of the regular season by both USA Today/ESPN and the Associated Press (AP). After its victory in the Orange Bowl, Michigan rose to No. 5 in the final polls issued by both the USA Today/ESPN and the AP.

Two Michigan players were named to the first team on the 1999 All-America college football team. Offensive guard Steve Hutchinson received first-team honors from Pro Football Weekly and CNNSI. Defensive tackle Rob Renes received first-team honors from The Sporting News. Renes was also selected as a first-team Academic All-American.

In addition, the following Michigan players received recognition on the 1999 All-Big Ten Conference football team:

- Steve Hutchinson, offensive guard - media (first team), coaches (first team)
- Rob Renes, defensive line - media (first team), coaches (first team)
- David Terrell, wide receiver - coaches (first team), media (second team)
- Jeff Backus, offensive tackle - media (first) team, coaches (second team)
- Ian Gold, linebacker - coaches (first team), media (second team)
- Tommy Hendricks, defensive back - coaches (first team)
- Anthony Thomas, running back - coaches (second team)
- Dhani Jones, linebacker - coaches (second team)
- Tom Brady, quarterback - coaches (honorable mention), media (honorable mention)

Tom Brady was selected as the team's most valuable player. Other team awards were presented as follows:

- Meyer Morton Award: Grady Brooks
- John Maulbetsch Award: Drew Henson
- Frederick Matthei Award: Anthony Thomas
- Arthur Robinson Scholarship Award: Dhani Jones
- Dick Katcher Award: Rob Renes
- Hugh Rader Jr. Award: Jeff Backus
- Robert P. Ufer Award: Marcus Knight
- Roger Zatkoff Award: Ian Gold

== Statistical achievements and leaders ==
Marcus Knight tied Desmond Howard (1991) and Anthony Carter (1981) for the school record with three consecutive 100-yard reception games. Braylon Edwards would post four in 2003 and 2004. Tom Brady concluded his career by breaking his own single-game pass completions record with the current record of 34 against Alabama in the January 1, 2000 Orange Bowl. The game marked the tenth 4-touchdown passing performance in school history, a feat that is still unsurpassed by any Michigan quarterback. For the season, he tied his own single-season completions record (214) set the prior season and broken by John Navarre in 2002. He also set the single-season passing yards per game record of 215.5, surpassing Jim Harbaugh's 209.9 in 1986 and broken by Navarre in 2002. He broke Todd Collins' career 200-yard game record of 14 set in 1994 by one, a record broken by Navarre during his junior season in 2002. The team set the current NCAA single-season all-time home attendance record with an average of 111,175.

=== Rushing ===
| Player | Attempts | Net yards | Yards per attempt | Touchdowns |
|---|---|---|---|---|
| Anthony Thomas | 283 | 1257 | 4.4 | 16 |

No other player had more than 100 rushing yards.

=== Passing ===
| Player | Attempts | Completions | Interceptions | Comp % | Yards | TD |
|---|---|---|---|---|---|---|
| Tom Brady | 295 | 180 | 6 | 61.0 | 2217 | 16 |
| Drew Henson | 89 | 46 | 2 | 51.7 | 546 | 3 |

=== Receiving ===
| Player | Receptions | Yards | Yds/Recp | TD |
|---|---|---|---|---|
| David Terrell | 61 | 888 | 14.6 | 4 |
| Marcus Knight | 36 | 766 | 21.3 | 6 |
| Marquise Walker | 31 | 331 | 10.7 | 2 |
| Aaron Shea | 31 | 239 | 7.7 | 3 |
| Anthony Thomas | 29 | 166 | 5.7 | 0 |
| DiAllo Johnson | 14 | 160 | 11.4 | 1 |
| Shawn Thompson | 11 | 115 | 10.5 | 1 |

== Roster ==
1999 Michigan Wolverines football team roster
Players
Coaches
Offense

| Pos. | # | Name | Class |
|---|---|---|---|
| WR | 1 | David Terrell | So |
| WR | 4 | Marquise Walker | So |
| QB | 7 | Drew Henson | Fr |
| RB | 8 | Walter Cross | So |
| WR | 9 | DiAllo Johnson | Sr |
| QB | 10 | Tom Brady | Sr |
| QB | 13 | Jason Kapsner | Sr |
| QB | 16 | John Navarre | Fr |
| WR | 19 | Ronald Bellamy | Fr |
| RB | 24 | Charles Drake | Fr |
| RB | 32 | Anthony Thomas | Jr |
| RB | 35 | B. J. Askew | Fr |
| TE/FB | 36 | Aaron Shea | Sr |
| OT | 52 | Chris Ziemann | Sr |
| C | 65 | David Brandt | Jr |
| OL | 69 | Todd Mossa | Jr |
| OL | 72 | Ben Mast | Jr |
| G | 76 | Steve Hutchinson | Jr |
| OT | 79 | Jeff Backus | Jr |
| TE | 83 | Bennie Joppru | So |
| TE | 84 | Shawn Thompson | Jr |
| WR | 85 | Marcus Knight | Sr |

Defense

| Pos. | # | Name | Class |
|---|---|---|---|
| CB | 2 | Cato June | So |
| CB | 3 | Todd Howard | So |
| CB | 5 | James Whitley | Jr |
| ILB | 6 | Victor Hobson | So |
| FS | 15 | DeWayne Patmon | Jr |
| LB | 17 | Larry Foote | So |
| ILB | 20 | Ian Gold | Sr |
| LB | 31 | John Spytek | Fr |
| DE | 37 | Kurt Anderson | Jr |
| LB | 41 | Tommy Hendricks | Sr |
| LB | 55 | Dhani Jones | Sr |
| LB | 56 | James Hall | Sr |
| DT | 58 | Rob Renes | Sr |
| OLB | 59 | Grady Brooks | Sr |
| DT | 91 | Josh Williams | Sr |
| DT | 94 | Eric Wilson | Jr |

Special teams

| Pos. | # | Name | Class |
|---|---|---|---|
| K | 25 | Hayden Epstein | So |
| K | 45 | Jeff Del Verne | Sr |

Head coach

- Lloyd Carr

Coordinators/assistant coaches

Legend

- (C) Team captain
- (S) Suspended
- (I) Ineligible
- Injured
- Redshirt

Roster

== Rankings ==
Ranking movements Legend: ██ Increase in ranking ██ Decrease in ranking
| | Week | | | | | | | | | | | | | | | | |
| Poll | Pre | 1 | 2 | 3 | 4 | 5 | 6 | 7 | 8 | 9 | 10 | 11 | 12 | 13 | 14 | 15 | Final |
|---|---|---|---|---|---|---|---|---|---|---|---|---|---|---|---|---|---|
| AP | 8 | 7 | 6 | 6 | 4 | 4 | 3 | 10 | 9 | 15 | 16 | 16 | 10 | 10 | 9 | 8 | 5 |
| Coaches | 7 | 7* | 5 | 5 | 4 | 4 | 3 | 10 | 13 | 14 | 15 | 15 | 10 | 10 | 9 | 8 | 5 |
| BCS | Not released | | | | | | | | | 12 | 13 | 12 | 10 | 10 | 9 | 8 | Not released |

== 2000 NFL draft ==
The following players were claimed in the 2000 NFL draft.

| Player | Position | Round | Pick | NFL club |
|---|---|---|---|---|
| Ian Gold | Linebacker | 2 | 40 | Denver Broncos |
| Aaron Shea | Tight end | 4 | 110 | Cleveland Browns |
| Josh Williams | Defensive tackle | 4 | 122 | Indianapolis Colts |
| Dhani Jones | Linebacker | 6 | 177 | New York Giants |
| Tom Brady | Quarterback | 6 | 199 | New England Patriots |
| Rob Renes | Defensive tackle | 7 | 235 | Indianapolis Colts |

- Running back Anthony Thomas was selected by the Chicago Bears in the 2001 NFL draft.
- Quarterback Drew Henson played professional baseball for the New York Yankees and played professional football for the Dallas Cowboys and the Detroit Lions. Henson was selected by the Cowboys in the 2003 NFL draft.

== Coaching staff ==
- Head coach: Lloyd Carr (5th season)
- Offensive coordinator: Mike DeBord (3rd season)
- Defensive coordinator: Jim Herrmann (3rd season)
- Assistant coaches:

- Teryl Austin - defensive assistant (1st year)
- Erik Campbell - wide receivers (5th year)
- Brady Hoke - defensive line (3rd year)
- Fred Jackson - assistant head coach and running backs (3rd year)
- Terry Malone - offensive line (3rd year)
- Bobby Morrison - special teams (3rd year) and recruiting coordinator (4th year)
- Stan Parrish - quarterbacks (4th year)

- Trainer: Paul Schmidt (9th year)
