= 1998 Michigan Wolverines football team =

American college football season

1998 Michigan Wolverines football

Big Ten co-champion Florida Citrus Bowl champion

Florida Citrus Bowl, W 45–31 vs. Arkansas
- Conference: Big Ten Conference

Ranking
- Coaches: No. 12
- AP: No. 12
- Record: 10–3 (7–1 Big Ten)
- Head coach: Lloyd Carr (4th season)
- Offensive coordinator: Mike DeBord (2nd season)
- Offensive scheme: Multiple
- Defensive coordinator: Jim Herrmann (2nd season)
- Base defense: Multiple
- MVP: Tai Streets
- Captains: Juaquin Feazell; Jon Jansen
- Home stadium: Michigan Stadium

1998 Big Ten Conference football standings
	Conf.			Overall
Team	W		L	W		L
No. 2 Ohio State %+	7	–	1	11	–	1
No. 6 Wisconsin $+	7	–	1	11	–	1
No. 12 Michigan +	7	–	1	10	–	3
No. 24 Purdue	6	–	2	9	–	4
No. 17 Penn State	5	–	3	9	–	3
Michigan State	4	–	4	6	–	6
Minnesota	2	–	6	5	–	6
Indiana	2	–	6	4	–	7
Illinois	2	–	6	3	–	8
Iowa	2	–	6	3	–	8
Northwestern	0	–	8	3	–	9
$ – BCS representative as conference champion; % – BCS at-large representative; + – Conference co-champions; Rankings from AP Poll

The 1998 Michigan Wolverines football team was an American football team that represented the University of Michigan as a member of the Big Ten Conference during the 1998 NCAA Division I-A football season. In their fourth year under head coach Lloyd Carr, the Wolverines compiled a 10–3 record (7–1 against conference opponents), finished in a three-way tie for the Big Ten championship, and were ranked No. 12 in the final Associated Press and USA Today/ESPN coaches' polls. They outscored opponents by a total of 359 to 235, ranking 42nd nationally in scoring offense (27.6 points per game) and 14th in scoring defense (18.1 points per game).

After the 1997 team won a share of the national championship, the 1998 team opened its season ranked No. 5, but lost two consecutive games (Notre Dame and Syracuse) at the start of the season. The team then won eight consecutive games before losing its rivalry game against Ohio State. The season ended with a victory over No. 11 Arkansas in the 1999 Florida Citrus Bowl.

Quarterback Tom Brady completed 200 of 323 passes for 2,427 yards with 14 touchdowns and 10 interceptions. The team's rushing offense was led by Anthony Thomas and Clarence Williams with 761 and 568 yards, respectively. Tai Streets was selected as the team's most valuable player and led the team's receivers with 60 receptions for 906 yards and 11 touchdowns. Jay Feely was the team's leading scorer with 82 points on 34 extra points and 16 field goals. Offensive tackle and team co-captain Jon Jansen was the only Michigan player to be recognized as a first-team All-American.

The team played its home games at Michigan Stadium in Ann Arbor, Michigan.

== Schedule ==
Date	Time	Opponent	Rank	Site	TV	Result	Attendance	Source
September 5	2:30 p.m.	at No. 22 Notre Dame*	No. 5	Notre Dame Stadium; Notre Dame, IN (rivalry)	NBC	L 20–36	80,012	
September 12	3:30 p.m.	No. 19 Syracuse*	No. 13	Michigan Stadium; Ann Arbor, MI	ABC	L 28–38	111,012	
September 19	12:00 p.m.	Eastern Michigan*		Michigan Stadium; Ann Arbor, MI	ESPN Plus	W 59–20	110,438	
September 26	12:00 p.m.	Michigan State		Michigan Stadium; Ann Arbor, MI (rivalry)	ABC	W 29–17	111,238	
October 3	3:30 p.m.	at Iowa	No. 25	Kinnick Stadium; Iowa City, IA	ABC	W 12–9	70,397	
October 17	7:00 p.m.	at Northwestern		Ryan Field; Evanston, IL (rivalry)	ESPN	W 12–6	47,129	
October 24	12:00 p.m.	Indiana^{†}		Michigan Stadium; Ann Arbor, MI	ESPN	W 21–10	110,863	
October 31	12:00 p.m.	at Minnesota	No. 22	Hubert H. Humphrey Metrodome; Minneapolis, MN (Little Brown Jug)	ESPN	W 15–10	41,310	
November 7	12:00 p.m.	No. 9 Penn State	No. 22	Michigan Stadium; Ann Arbor, MI (rivalry)	ABC	W 27–0	111,019	
November 14	12:00 p.m.	No. 8 Wisconsin	No. 15	Michigan Stadium; Ann Arbor, MI	ESPN	W 27–10	111,217	
November 21	12:00 p.m.	at No. 7 Ohio State	No. 11	Ohio Stadium; Columbus, OH (The Game)	ABC	L 16–31	94,339	
November 28	9:30 p.m.	at Hawaii*	No. 15	Aloha Stadium; Halawa, HI	ESPN2	W 48–17	34,193	
January 1, 1999	1:00 p.m.	vs. No. 11 Arkansas*	No. 15	Florida Citrus Bowl; Orlando, FL (Florida Citrus Bowl)	ABC	W 45–31	63,584	
*Non-conference game; ^{†}Homecoming; Rankings from AP Poll released prior to the game; All times are in Eastern time

== Game summaries ==
=== At Notre Dame ===
#5 Michigan Wolverines (0–0) at #22 Notre Dame Fighting Irish (0–0)

Quarter	1	2	3	4	Total
Michigan	3	10	0	7	20
Notre Dame	3	3	17	13	36

at Notre Dame Stadium, South Bend, Indiana

- Date: September
- Game time: 3:30 p.m. EDT
- Game weather: Sunny, 83 °F (28 °C)
- Game attendance: 80,012
- TV: NBC
- Box Score, Box Score

Team	Category	Player	Statistics
Michigan	Passing	Tom Brady	23/36, 267 Yds
Michigan	Rushing	Clarence Williams	13 Rush, 114 Yds
Michigan	Receiving	Marcus Knight	5 Rec, 126 Yds
Notre Dame	Passing	Jarious Jackson	4/10, 96 Yds, 2 TD, INT
Notre Dame	Rushing	Autry Denson	24 Rush, 162 Yds, 2 TD
Notre Dame	Receiving	Raki Nelson	2 Rec, 68 Yds, TD

Scoring summary

Quarter	Time	Drive			Team	Scoring information	Score	
Quarter	Time	Plays	Yards	TOP	Team	Scoring information	UM	ND
1	9:37		57		Michigan	36-yard field goal by Kraig Baker	3	0
1	7:30	5	57		Notre Dame	32-yard field goal by Jim Sanson	3	3
2	11:36	7	54	2:28	Michigan	21-yard field goal by Jay Feely	6	3
2	3:08	11	50	4:29	Notre Dame	27-yard field goal by Jim Sanson	6	6
2	0:23	12	72	2:45	Michigan	Tom Brady 1-yard touchdown run, Jay Feely kick good	13	6
3	11:34	10	62	3:26	Notre Dame	32-yard field goal by Jim Sanson	13	9
3	7:40	7	34	3:43	Notre Dame	Dan O'Leary 4-yard touchdown reception from Jarious Jackson, Jim Sanson kick good	13	16
3	5:02	1	35		Notre Dame	Raki Nelson 35-yard touchdown reception from Jarious Jackson, Jim Sanson kick good	13	23
4	13:23	9	52	4:05	Notre Dame	Autry Denson 3-yard touchdown run, Jim Sanson kick good	13	30
4	4:09				Notre Dame	Autry Denson 1-yard touchdown run, Jim Sanson kick no good	13	36
4	2:09		80		Michigan	Jerame Tuman 8-yard touchdown reception from Drew Henson, Jay Feely kick good	20	36
"TOP" = time of possession. For other American football terms, see Glossary of American football.							20	36

=== Syracuse ===
#19 Syracuse Orangemen (0–1) at #13 Michigan Wolverines (0–1)

Quarter	1	2	3	4	Total
Syracuse	17	7	14	0	38
Michigan	0	7	0	21	28

at Michigan Stadium, Ann Arbor, Michigan

- Date: September 12, 1988
- Game time: 3:30 p.m.
- Game weather: Mostly sunny, high 80s
- Game attendance: 111,012
- TV: ABC
- Box Score

Team	Category	Player	Statistics
Syracuse	Passing	Donovan McNabb	21/27, 233 Yds, 3 TD
Syracuse	Rushing	Donovan McNabb	19 Rush, 60 Yds, TD
Syracuse	Receiving	Kevin Johnson	6 Rec, 78 Yds, TD
Michigan	Passing	Tom Brady	13/24, 104 Yds, TD, INT
Michigan	Rushing	Walter Cross	10 Rush, 104 Yds, 2 TD
Michigan	Receiving	Tai Streets	5 Rec, 53 Yds, TD

Scoring summary

Quarter	Time	Drive			Team	Scoring information	Score	
Quarter	Time	Plays	Yards	TOP	Team	Scoring information	SYR	UM
1	10:04	11	78	4:56	Syracuse	Kevin Johnson 6-yard touchdown run, Nathan Trout kick good	7	0
1	8:28	3	31	0:45	Syracuse	Rob Konrad 26-yard touchdown reception from Donovan McNabb, Nathan Trout kick good	14	0
1	5:19	6	44	1:36	Syracuse	33-yard field goal by Nathan Trout	17	0
2	5:36	14	86	7:06	Syracuse	Donovan McNabb 17-yard touchdown run, Nathan Trout kick good	24	0
2	0:46	5	39	0:28	Michigan	Tai Streets 4-yard touchdown reception from Tom Brady, Jay Feely kick good	24	7
3	5:27	11	59	4:38	Syracuse	Kevin Johnson 9-yard touchdown reception from Donovan McNabb, Nathan Trout kick good	31	7
3	1:47	5	52	2:10	Syracuse	Rob Konrad 9-yard touchdown reception from Donovan McNabb, Nathan Trout kick good	38	7
4	6:56	6	78	2:46	Michigan	Walter Cross 1-yard touchdown run, Jay Feely kick good	38	14
4	0:55	5	50	0:36	Michigan	Walter Cross 5-yard touchdown run, Jay Feely kick good	38	21
4	0:03	9	48	0:52	Michigan	Marcus Knight 16-yard touchdown reception from Drew Henson, Jay Feely kick good	38	28
"TOP" = time of possession. For other American football terms, see Glossary of American football.							38	28

=== Eastern Michigan ===
Eastern Michigan at Michigan

Team	1	2	3	4	Total
Eastern Michigan	6	0	7	7	20
• Michigan	17	7	14	21	59

- Date: September 19
- Location: Michigan Stadium
- Game attendance: 110,438
- TV announcers (ESPN Plus): Wayne Larrivee, Randy Wright, Jim Barbar

Scoring summary
1	13:59	MICH	Anthony Thomas 2-yard run (Jay Feely kick)	MICH 7–0
1	9:06	MICH	Thomas 2-yard run (Feely kick)	MICH 14–0
1	4:02	MICH	Feely 24-yard field goal	MICH 17–0
1	2:44	EMU	Ethan Vannoy 1-yard run (Ventura kick blocked by James Hall)	MICH 17–6
2	11:	MICH	William Peterson 51-yard interception return (Feely kick)	MICH 24–6
3	13:11	EMU	Jermaine Sheffield 37-yard pass from Walt Church (Justin Ventura kick)	MICH 24–13
3	5:59	MICH	Anthony Thomas (4-yard run (Feely kick)	MICH 31–13
3	2:43	MICH	David Terrell 13-yard pass from Tom Brady (Feely kick)	MICH 38–13
4	11:59	MICH	Terrell 32-yard pass from Drew Henson (Feely kick)	MICH 45–13
4	11:05	MICH	Anthony Jordan 32-yard interception return (Feely kick)	MICH 52–13
4	6:10	EMU	Vannoy 4-yard pass from Church (Ventura kick)	MICH 52–20
4	1:41	MICH	Justin Fargas 1-yard run (Hayden Epstein kick)	MICH 59–20

On September 19, Michigan defeated Eastern Michigan, 59–20, before a crowd of 110,438 at Michigan Stadium. On Michigan's first possession, Michigan drove 70 yards for a touchdown on four plays - all runs by Anthony Thomas, including runs of 36 and 26 yards. Michigan drove 39 yards on its second possession, scoring on a two-yard touchdown run by Thomas. On their third possession, the Wolverines were held to a 24-yard field goal by Jay Feely. Late in the first quarter, Eastern Michigan struck back with a 71-yard pass from Walt Church to Brandon Campbell to the one-yard line; Eastern then scored on a one-yard run by Ethan Vannoy. It was the first time Eastern Michigan had scored against a Michigan football team.

On the opening drive of the second quarter, William Peterson intercepted a tipped pass and returned it 51 yards for a touchdown. Peterson's interception return resulted in the only points scored in the second quarter. Michigan led, 24–6, at halftime.

Early in the third quarter, Michigan's James Whitley fumbled a punt return, and Ken Philpot of Eastern Michigan recovered the loose ball at Michigan's 37-yard line. On the next play from scrimmage, Church completed a 37-yard touchdown pass to Jermaine Sheffield with Whitley covering. After the Sheffield touchdown, Tom Brady led Michigan on an 80-yard, 16-play drive that consumed seven minutes and 12 seconds. The drive ended with a four-yard touchdown run by Thomas. On its next possession, Michigan again drove downfield for 62 yards, starting with a 34-yard pass from Brady to Marcus Knight and ending with a 13-yard touchdown pass from Brady to David Terrell (Terrell's first college touchdown). Michigan led, 38–13, at the end of the third quarter.

In the fourth quarter, freshman Drew Henson entered the game at quarterback on a four-play, 39-yard drive ending with a 32-yard touchdown pass from freshman Henson to freshman Terrell. Less than a minute later, Anthony Jordan intercepted a pass from Church and returned it 32 yards for a touchdown, giving Michigan a 52–13 lead. Eastern Michigan responded with a 12-play, 80-yard drive ending with a four-yard touchdown pass from church to Ethan Vannoy. Henson then led Michigan on a 61-yard drive ending with a one-yard touchdown run by freshman running back Justin Fargas.

Eastern Michigan tallied 424 yards of total offense, surpassing Michigan's 418 yards. Eastern Michigan quarterback Church completed 24 of 32 passes for 343 yards, though he was intercepted four times. True freshman receiver David Terrell had four receptions for 65 yards and two touchdowns. Michigan captain and safety Marcus Ray was suspended indefinitely from the team prior to the game after notification from the NCAA of a tip that Ray allegedly had unpermitted contact with a sports agent during the summer.

Statistics	EMU	UM
First downs	19	24
Plays–yards	78–424	66–418
Rushes–yards	33–81	41–237
Passing yards	343	181
Passing: comp–att–int	32-45-4	17–25–1
Time of possession	34:01	25:59

Team	Category	Player	Statistics
EMU	Passing	Walt Church	24/32, 343 yards, 2 TD, 4 INT
EMU	Rushing	Ethan Vannoy	13 carries, 42 yards, 1 TD
EMU	Receiving	Jermaine Sheffield	5 receptions, 111 yards, 1 TD
Michigan	Passing	Tom Brady	14/19, 128 yards, 1 TD, 1 INT
Michigan	Rushing	Anthony Thomas	15 carries, 117 yards, 3 TD
Michigan	Receiving	David Terrell	4 receptions, 65 yards, 2 TD

=== Michigan State ===
Michigan State at Michigan

Team	1	2	3	4	Total
Michigan State	10	7	0	0	17
• Michigan	10	10	3	6	29

- Date: September 26
- Location: Michigan Stadium
- Game start: 12:00 p.m.
- Game attendance: 111,238
- TV announcers: ABC

Scoring summary
1	13:20	MSU	Paul Edinger 43-yard field goal	MSU 3–0
1	10:01	MICH	Jay Feely 51-yard field goal	TIE 3–3
1	5:44	MSU	Plaxico Burress 12-yard pass from Bill Burke (Edinger kick)	MSU 10–3
1	2:36	MICH	Anthony Thomas 69-yard run (Feely kick)	TIE 10–10
2	6:58	MICH	Tai Streets 5-yard pass from Tom Brady(Feely kick)	MICH 17–10
2	4:32	MICH	Feely 45-yard field goal	MICH 20–10
2	0:48	MSU	Burke 1-yard run (Edinger kick)	MICH 20–17
3	9:11	MICH	Feely 38-yard field goal	MICH 23–17
4	10:55	MICH	Brady 1-yard run (pass failed)	MICH 29–17

=== At Iowa ===
Michigan at Iowa

Team	1	2	3	4	Total
• No. 25 Michigan	7	0	0	5	12
Iowa	0	9	0	0	9

- Date: October 4
- Location: Kinnick Stadium, Iowa City, IA
- Game start: 3:30 p.m.
- Game attendance: 70,397
- TV announcers: ABC

Scoring summary
1	8:40	MICH	Tai Streets 14-yard pass from Tom Brady (Jay Feely kick)	MICH 7–0
2	12:29	IOWA	Tim Douglas 49-yard field goal	MICH 7–3
2	6:47	IOWA	Zach Bromert 29-yard field goal	MICH 7–6
2	0:15	IOWA	Bromert 28-yard field goal	IOWA 9–7
4	8:19	MICH	Feely 22-yard field goal	MICH 10–9
4	0:39	MICH	Anthony Jordan tackle of Kalhil Hill on punt return for safety	MICH 12–9

=== At Northwestern ===
Michigan at Northwestern

Team	1	2	3	4	Total
• Michigan	0	7	0	5	12
Northwestern	3	3	0	0	6

- Date: October 18
- Location: Ryan Field
- Game start: 7:00 p.m.
- Game attendance: 47,129
- TV announcers: ESPN

Scoring summary
1	3:57	NW	Brian Gowins 29-yard field goal	NW 3–0
2	0:59	NW	Gowins 40-yard field goal	NW 6–0
2	0:35	MICH	Tai Streets 30-yard pass from Tom Brady (Jay Feely kick)	MICH 7–6
4	9:13	MICH	Feely 32-yard field goal	MICH 10–6
4	4:12	MICH	Northwestern snaps ball out of endzone for safety	MICH 12–6

=== Indiana ===
Indiana at Michigan

Team	1	2	3	4	Total
Indiana	7	0	3	0	10
• Michigan	0	7	7	7	21

- Date: October 25
- Location: Michigan Stadium
- Game start: 12:00 p.m.
- Game attendance: 110,863
- TV announcers: ESPN

Scoring summary
1	10:07	IND	Chris Gall (Andy Payne kick)	IND 7–0
2	1:15	MICH	Anthony Thomas 2-yard run (Jay Feely kick)	TIE 7–7
3	8:16	MICH	Tai Streets 51-yard pass from Tom Brady (Feely kick)	MICH 14–7
3	5:11	MICH	Payne 31-yard field goal	MICH 14–10
4	10:15	MICH	Streets 4-yard pass from Brady (Feely kick)	MICH 21–10

=== At Minnesota ===
Michigan at Minnesota

Team	1	2	3	4	Total
• No. 22 Michigan	7	3	0	5	15
Minnesota	10	0	0	0	10

- Date: October 31
- Location: Metrodome, Minneapolis
- Game start: 12:00 p.m.
- Game attendance: 41,310
- TV announcers: ESPN

Scoring summary
1	9:07	MINN	Adam Bailey 28-yard field goal	MINN 3–0
1	8:46	MICH	Tai Streets 76-yard pass from Tom Brady (Jay Feely kick)	MICH 7–3
1	0:19	MINN	Travis Graham recoveres fumbled snap on U-M punt in end zone (Bailey kick)	MINN 10–7
2	5:14	MICH	Feely 18-yard field goal	TIE 10–10
4	10:42	MICH	James Hall sack of Cockerham for safety	MICH 12–10
4	6:36	MICH	Feely 42-yard field goal`	MICH 15–6

=== Penn State ===
Penn State at Michigan

Team	1	2	3	4	Total
No. 9 Penn State	0	0	0	0	0
• No. 22 Michigan	10	7	3	7	27

- Date: November 7
- Location: Michigan Stadium
- Game start: 12:00 p.m.
- Game attendance: 111,019
- TV announcers (Keith Jackson, Bob Griese): ABC Sports

Scoring summary
1	10:34	MICH	Aaron Shea 26-yard pass from Tom Brady (Jay Feely kick)	MICH 7–0
1	8:44	MICH	Feely 18-yard field goal	MICH 10–0
2	0:50	MICH	Tai Streets 7-yard pass from Brady (Feely kick)	MICH 17–0
3	8:15	MICH	Feely 49-yard field goal	MICH 20–0
4	3:03	MICH	Anthony Thomas 1-yard run (Feely kick)	MICH 27–0

On November 7, Michigan, ranked No. 22 in the BCS Poll, upset Penn State, ranked No. 10 in the BCS poll, by a 27–0 score before a crowd of 111,019 at Michigan Stadium. On Michigan's first possession, Tom Brady led the Wolverines on an eight-play, 63-yard touchdown drive, concluding with a 26-yard pass from Brady to Aaron Shea. On the next drive, Kevin Thompson of Penn State fumbled, and Josh Williams recovered the loose ball for Michigan. Michigan capitalized with an 18-yard field goal by Jay Feely. Penn State drove to Michigan's 17-yard line on the next drive, but Michigan's James Hall blocked Travis Forney's kick for field goal. Clarence Williams then fumbled the ball back to Penn State inside the Michigan 10-yard line.

On the first play of the second quarter, Penn State ran the ball on fourth-and-goal from the two-yard line, but Sam Sword stopped the runner short of the goal line. Late in the second quarter, Brady led Michigan on an 80-yard touchdown drive, featuring a 40-yard gain on a screen pass to Anthony Thomas and ending with a seven-yard pass to Tai Streets. Michigan led, 17–0, at halftime.

In the third quarter, Dewayne Patmon intercepted a Kevin Thompson pass near midfield, and Michigan again capitalized as Feely kicked a 49-yard field goal. No other points were scored by either team in the third quarter. In the fourth quarter, Brady led Michigan on an 11-play, 46-yard drive ending with a one-yard run by Anthony Thomas.

Tom Brady completed 17 of 30 passes for 224 yards and two touchdowns and was selected as the Chevrolet Michigan player of the game. Linebacker Mac Morrison had 12 tackles and was selected as the Chevrolet Penn State player of the game. After being suspended for the first six games of the season, defensive back Marcus Ray returned to the lineup for Michigan.

Statistics	PSU	UM
First downs	13	18
Plays–yards	61–200	78–360
Rushes–yards	35–106	47–136
Passing yards	94	224
Passing: comp–att–int	8-26-3	18–31–1
Time of possession	25:10	34:50

Team	Category	Player	Statistics
Penn State	Passing	Kevin Thompson	8/21, 94 yards, 2 INT
Penn State	Rushing	Chris Eberly	10 carries, 55 yards
Penn State	Receiving	Corey Jones	3 receptions, 45 yards
Michigan	Passing	Tom Brady	17/30, 224 yards, 2 TD, 1 INT
Michigan	Rushing	Clarence Williams	24 carries, 83 yards
Michigan	Receiving	Aaron Shea	3 receptions, 58 yards, 1 TD

=== Wisconsin ===
Wisconsin at Michigan

Team	1	2	3	4	Total
No. 8 Wisconsin	7	0	3	0	10
• No. 15 Michigan	7	14	3	3	27

- Date: November 14
- Location: Michigan Stadium
- Game start: 12:00 p.m.
- Game attendance: 111,217
- Television network: ESPN

Scoring summary
1	3:38	WIS	Chris Chambers 80-yard pass from Mike Samuel (Matt Davenport kick)	WIS 7–0
1	0:03	MICH	Jerame Tuman 6-yard pass from Tom Brady (Jay Feely kick)	TIE 7–7
2	12:04	MICH	Anthony Thomas 59-yard run (Feely kick)	MICH 14–7
2	0:48	MICH	Thomas 15-yard run (Feely kick)	MICH 21–7
3	7:38	WIS	Davenport 39-yard field goal	MICH 21–10
3	5:00	MICH	Feeley 29-yard field goal	MICH 24–10
4	14:44	MICH	Feely 49-yard field goal	MICH 27–10

On November 14, No. 15 Michigan upset No 8 Wisconsin by a 27–10 score before a crowd of 111,217 at Michigan Stadium. In the first minute of the game, Andre Weathers intercepted a pass by Wisconsin quarterback Mike Samuel. Michigan took over at the Wisconsin 25-yard line. On fourth down, Jay Feely faked a field goal but was stopped short of the first down. Samuel later connected with Chris Chambers on an 80-yard touchdown reception. Later in the quarter, Michigan tied the score on a six-yard touchdown pass from Tom Brady to Jerame Tuman.

Michigan scored two touchdowns in the second quarter. Early in the quarter, anthony Thomas ran 59 yards for a touchdown. Later in the quarter, Michigan drove 89 yards with Brady passing to Marcus Knight for 32 yards and Thomas scoring on a 15-yard run at the 0:48 mark. Michigan led, 21–7, at the half.

In the third quarter, Wisconsin blocked a Michigan punt from behind the goal line and took over with excellent field position. Michigan's defense held, and Wisconsin settled from a 39-yard field goal. Feely also kicked a 29-yard field goal. Feely added a 49-yard field goal early in the fourth quarter.

The Wolverines held Wisconsin running back Ron Dayne to 53 rushing yards (3.3 yards per carry) and no touchdowns.

Statistics	UW	UM
First downs	9	21
Plays–yards	54–190	78–360
Rushes–yards	31–58	53–257
Passing yards	132	219
Passing: comp–att–int	9-23-2	16–25–1
Time of possession	26:14	33:46

Team	Category	Player	Statistics
Wisconsin	Passing	Mike Samuel	7/17, 126 yards, 1 TD, 1 INT
Wisconsin	Rushing	Ron Dayne	16 carries, 53 yards
Wisconsin	Receiving	Chris Chambers	1 receptions, 80 yards, 1 TD
Michigan	Passing	Tom Brady	15/24, 202 yards, 1 TD, 1 INT
Michigan	Rushing	Clarence Williams	22 carries, 121 yards
Michigan	Receiving	Marcus Knight	3 receptions, 60 yards, 1 TD

=== At Ohio State ===
Michigan Wolverines (8–2) at Ohio State Buckeyes (9–1)

Quarter	1	2	3	4	Total
Michigan	0	10	3	3	16
Ohio St	14	7	10	0	31

at Ohio Stadium, Columbus, Ohio

- Date: November 21, 1998
- Game time: 12:00 p.m.
- Game weather: Cloudy, 38 °F (3 °C)
- Game attendance: 94,339
- Referee: Bill LeMonnier
- TV: ABC

Game information

First quarter

- OSU – Michael Wiley 53-yard run (Dan Stultz kick), 12:20. Ohio St 7–0. Drive: 4 plays, 69 yards, 1:18.
- OSU – Dee Miller 16-yard pass from Joe Germaine (Dan Stultz kick), 9:44. Ohio St 14–0. Drive: 3 plays, 16 yards, 1:33.

Second quarter

- MICH – Jay Feely 27-yard field goal, 14:33. Ohio St 14–3. Drive: 4 plays, 5 yards, 0:59.
- OSU – David Boston 30-yard pass from Joe Germaine (Dan Stultz kick), 4:03. Ohio St 21–3. Drive: 2 plays, 35 yards, 0:44.
- MICH – Tai Streets 3-yard pass from Tom Brady (Jay Feely kick), 0:25. Ohio St 21–10. Drive: 9 plays, 80 yards, 2:38.

Third quarter

- OSU - David Boston 43-yard pass from Joe Germaine (Dan Stultz kick), 9:51. Ohio St 28–10. Drive: 4 plays, 54 yards, 1:14.
- MICH – Jay Feely 34-yard field goal, 4:47. Ohio St 28–13. Drive: 9 plays, 27 yards, 4:50.
- OSU – Dan Stultz 39-yard field goal, 1:36. Ohio St 31–13. Drive: 6 plays, 58 yards, 3:06.

Fourth quarter

- MICH – Jay Feely 30-yard field goal, 14:47. Ohio St 31–16. Drive: 10 plays, 68 yards, 1:41.

Top passers

- MICH – Tom Brady – 31/56, 375 yards, TD, 2 INT
- OSU – Joe Germaine – 16/28, 330 yards, 3 TD

Top rushers

- MICH – Clarence Williams – 11 rushes, 13 yards
- OSU – Michael Wiley – 12 rushes, 120 yards, TD

Top receivers

- MICH – Tai Streets – 9 receptions, 118 yards, TD
- OSU – David Boston – 10 receptions, 217 yards, 2 TD

=== At Hawaii ===
Michigan at Hawaii

Team	1	2	3	4	Total
• No. 15 Michigan	14	21	6	7	48
Hawaii	3	0	6	8	17

- Date: November 28
- Location: Aloha Stadium, Honolulu
- Game start: 9:30 p.m.
- Game attendance: 26,786

Scoring summary
1	9:13	HAW	Shrout 17-yard field goal	HAW 3–0
1	4:59	MICH	Anthony Thomas 38-yard run (Jay Feely kick)	MICH 7–3
1	2:57	MICH	Tai Streets 28-yard pass from Tom Brady (Feely kick)	MICH 14–3
2	14:04	MICH	Thomas 4-yard run (Feely kick)	MICH 21–3
2	10:02	MICH	Thomas 16-yard run (Feely kick)	MICH 28–3
2	4:51	MICH	Streets 6-yard pass from Brady (Feely kick)	MICH 35–3
3	10:45	MICH	Drew Henson 34-yard run (kick failed)	MICH 41–3
3	1:05	HAW	Kane 22-yard pass from Robinson (kick blocked)	MICH 41–10
4	10:50	HAW	Pigg 1-yard run (Mims pass from Robinson	MICH 41–17
4	10:41	MICH	Thomas 80-yard run (Feely kick)	MICH 48–17

On November 28, Michigan defeated Hawaii, 48–17, before a crowd of 26,786 at Aloha Stadium in Honolulu.

Statistics	UM	UH
First downs	21	20
Plays–yards	68–524	85–401
Rushes–yards	46–327	33–102
Passing yards	199	328
Passing: comp–att–int	14-22-0	24–52–1
Time of possession	26:22	33:38

Team	Category	Player	Statistics
Michigan	Passing	Tom Brady	9/10, 142 yards, 2 TD
Michigan	Rushing	Anthony Thomas	13 carries, 183 yards, 4 TD
Michigan	Receiving	Tai Streets	5 receptions, 90 yards, 2 TD
Hawaii	Passing	Robinson	24/51, 328 yards, 1 TD
Hawaii	Rushing	Thompson	5 carries, 25 yards
Hawaii	Receiving	Carter	8 receptions, 154 yards

=== Florida Citrus Bowl (vs Arkansas) ===
Michigan vs. Arkansas

Team	1	2	3	4	Total
No. 11 Arkansas	0	10	14	7	31
• No. 15 Michigan	3	21	0	21	45

- Date: January 1, 1999
- Location: Florida Citrus Bowl, Orlando, FL
- Game start: 1:00 p.m.
- Game attendance: 63,584

Scoring summary
1	10:37	MICH	Jay Feely 43-yard field goal	MICH 3–0
2	10:37	ARK	Michael Williams 35-yard pass from Clint Stoerner (Todd Latourette kick)	ARK 7–3
2	7:40	MICH	Anthony Thomas 2-yard run (Feely kick)	MICH 10–7
2	5:39	MICH	Ian Gold 46-yard interception return (Feely kick)	MICH 17–7
2	2:12	ARK	Latourette 42-yard field goal	MICH 17–10
2	0:34	MICH	Thomas 5-yard run (Feely kick)	MICH 24–10
3	9:10	ARK	Chrys Chukwuma 2-yard run (Latourette kick)	MICH 24–17
3	5:48	ARK	Chukwuma 1-yard run (Latourette kick)	TIE 24–24
4	12:18	ARK	Joe Dean Davenport 9-yard pass from Stoerner (Latourette kick)	ARK 31–24
4	5:49	MICH	Thomas 1-yard run (Feely kick)	TIE 31–31
4	2:25	MICH	DiAllo Johnson 21-yard pass from Brady (Feely kick)	MICH 38–31
4	3:48	MICH	James Whitley 26-yard interception return (Feely kick)	MICH 45–31

On January 1, 1999, No. 15 Michigan defeated No. 11 Arkansas, 45–31, before a crowd of 63,584 in the 1999 Florida Citrus Bowl in Orlando, Florida.

Statistics	UA	UM
First downs	20	21
Plays–yards	82–348	76–434
Rushes–yards	40–116	46–204
Passing yards	232	230
Passing: comp–att–int	17-42-2	16–30–2
Time of possession	28:43	31:17

Team	Category	Player	Statistics
Arkansas	Passing	Clint Stoerner	17/42, 232 yards, 2 TD, 2 INT
Arkansas	Rushing	Chrys Chukwuma	17 carries, 56 yards, 2 TD
Arkansas	Receiving	Michael Williams	7 receptions, 90 yards, 1 TD
Michigan	Passing	Tom Brady	14/27, 209 yards, 1 TD, 2 INT
Michigan	Rushing	Anthony Thomas	21 carries, 132 yards, 3 TD
Michigan	Receiving	Tai Streets	7 receptions, 129 yards

== Postseason and awards ==
In the final polls issued after the bowl games, Michigan was ranked No. 12 by both the Associated Press (AP) and USA Today/ESPN.

Offensive tackle Jon Jansen was the only Michigan player to receive first-team honors on the 1998 All-America college football team. He was selected by the American Football Coaches Association.

The following Michigan players received recognition on the 1998 All-Big Ten Conference football team:

- Steve Hutchinson, guard - media (first team), coaches (first team)
- Jerame Tuman, tight end - media (first team), coaches (first team)
- Jon Jansen, offensive tackle - media (first team), coaches (first team)
- Jeff Backus, offensive tackle - media (second team)
- Tai Streets, wide receiver - media (second team), coaches (second team)
- James Hall, defensive line - media (second team), coaches (second team)
- Rob Renes, defensive line - media (second team)
- Ian Gold, linebacker - media (second team)
- Sam Sword, linebacker - media (second team), coaches (second team)
- Tommy Hendricks, safety - media (second team), coaches (second team)
- Andre Weathers, cornerback - coaches (second team)

Jansen also received the coaches' award as the Big Ten offensive lineman of the year.

Wide receiver Tai Streets won the 1998 Bo Schembechler Award as the team's most valuable player. Other team awards were presented as follows:

- Meyer Morton Award: Tai Streets
- John Maulbetsch Award: Maurice Williams
- Frederick Matthei Award: Dhani Jones
- Arthur Robinson Scholarship Award: Rob Renes
- Dick Katcher Award: Rob Renes
- Hugh Rader Jr. Award: Jon Jansen
- Robert P. Ufer Award: Mark Campbell
- Roger Zatkoff Award: Sam Sword

== Statistical achievements and leaders ==
The team led the Big Ten in passing defense by holding all opponents to 181.2 yards per game and conference opponents to 139.2 yards per game. The team also led the conference in total defense in conference games (244.6), while Ohio State led for all games.

=== Rushing ===
Player	Attempts	Net yards	Yards per attempt	Touchdowns
Anthony Thomas	146	761	5.2	12
Clarence Williams	126	568	4.5	0
Justin Fargas	77	277	3.6	1
Walter Cross	35	145	4.1	2

=== Passing ===
Player	Attempts	Completions	Interceptions	Comp %	Yards	TD
Tom Brady	323	200	10	61.9	2427	14
Drew Henson	45	19	1	42.2	233	3

On November 21 against Ohio State, Tom Brady set multiple Michigan single-game passing records, including:

- 56 pass attempts, a total that remains Michigan's single-game record as of the 2022 season;
- 31 pass completions, a total that remained Michigan's single-game record until 1999 when Brady completed 34 games against Alabama;
- 375 passing yards

Brady set several other team passing records: single-season pass attempts record (350), ranking eighth as of 2022; and single-season completions (214), ranking sixth as of 2022.

=== Receiving ===
Player	Receptions	Yards	Yds/Recp	TD
Tai Streets	60	906	15.1	11
Marcus Knight	41	597	14.6	1
Jerame Tuman	27	247	9.1	2
DiAllo Johnson	9	155	17.2	0
Aaron Shea	14	144	10.3	1
Anthony Thomas	15	140	9.3	0
David Terrell	13	123	9.5	2

== Personnel ==
=== Roster ===
1998 Michigan Wolverines football team roster
Players
Coaches
Offense

Pos.	#	Name	Class
WR	1	David Terrell	Fr
WR	4	Marquise Walker	Fr
QB	7	Drew Henson	Fr
RB	8	Walter Cross	Fr
WR	9	DiAllo Johnson	Sr
QB	10	Tom Brady	Jr
QB	13	Jason Kapsner	Jr
RB	32	Anthony Thomas	So
TB	33	Clarence Williams	Sr
RB	34	Justin Fargas	Fr
FB	36	Aaron Shea	Jr
OT	52	Chris Ziemann	Jr
G	64	Steve Frazier	Sr
C	67	David Brandt	Jr
G	76	Steve Hutchinson	So
OT	77	Jon Jansen	Sr
OT	79	Jeff Backus	So
TE	80	Jerame Tuman	Sr
TE	84	Shawn Thompson	So
WR	85	Marcus Knight	Jr
WR	86	Tai Streets	Sr

Defense

Pos.	#	Name	Class
CB	5	James Whitley	So
FS	15	DeWayne Patmon	So
LB	17	Larry Foote	Fr
LB	20	Ian Gold	Jr
CB	23	William Peterson	So
S	29	Marcus Ray	Sr
CB	30	Andre Weathers	Sr
DE	37	Kurt Anderson	So
LB	41	Tommy Hendricks	Jr
LB	43	Clint Copenhaver	Sr
LB	55	Dhani Jones	Jr
LB	56	James Hall	Sr
NT	58	Rob Renes	Sr
DT	91	Josh Williams	Jr
LB	93	Sam Sword	Sr
DT	94	Eric Wilson	Jr

Special teams

Pos.	#	Name	Class
K	25	Hayden Epstein	Fr
P	38	Jason Vinson	Sr
K	49	Jay Feely	Sr

Head coach

- Lloyd Carr

Coordinators/assistant coaches

- Terry Malone OL

Legend

- (C) Team captain
- (S) Suspended
- (I) Ineligible
- Injured
- Redshirt

Roster

=== Coaching staff ===
- Head coach: Lloyd Carr (4th season)
- Offensive coordinator: Mike DeBord (2nd season)
- Defensive coordinator: Jim Herrmann (2nd season)
- Assistant coaches:

- Teryl Austin
- Erik Campbell - wide receivers (4th year)
- Brady Hoke - defensive line (2nd year)
- Fred Jackson - assistant head coach and running backs (2nd year)
- Terry Malone - offensive line (2nd year)
- Bobby Morrison - special teams (2nd year) and recruiting coordinator (3rd year)
- Stan Parrish - quarterbacks (3rd year)

- Trainer: Paul Schmidt (8th year)

== Rankings ==
Ranking movements Legend: ██ Increase in ranking ██ Decrease in ranking — = Not ranked ( ) = First-place votes
	Week															
Poll	Pre	1	2	3	4	5	6	7	8	9	10	11	12	13	14	Final
AP	5 (4)	13	—	—	25	—	—	—	22	22	15	11	15	15	15	12
Coaches Poll	5 (4)	14	—	—	—	—	—	—	22	22	16	11	16	15	15	12
BCS	Not released								—	—	19	12	14	—	—	Not released

== 1999 NFL draft ==
The following players were selected in the 1999 NFL draft:

- Jon Jansen - drafted by Washington Redskins in second round
- Jerame Tuman - drafted by Pittsburgh Steelers in fifth round
- Tai Streets - drafted by San Francisco 49ers in sixth round
- Andre Weathers - drafted by New York Giants in sixth round
