= Drew Henson =

American baseball and football player (born 1980)

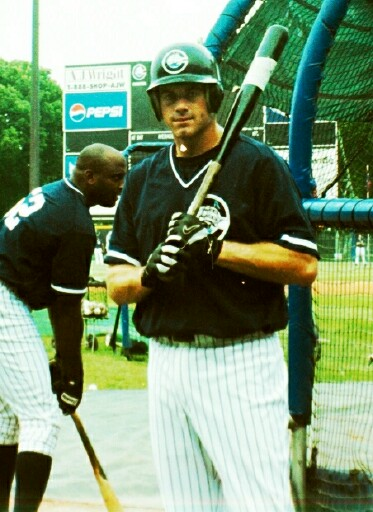
- Third baseman
- Born: February 13, 1980 (age 46); San Diego, California, U.S.
- Batted: Right Threw: Right

MLB debut
- September 5, 2002, for the New York Yankees

Last MLB appearance
- September 28, 2003, for the New York Yankees

MLB statistics
- Batting average: .111
- Hits: 1
- Runs scored: 3
- Stats at Baseball Reference

Teams
- New York Yankees (2002–2003)
- Football career
No. 7, 12
- Position: Quarterback
Personal information
- Listed height: 6 ft 4 in (1.93 m)
- Listed weight: 235 lb (107 kg)
Career information
- High school: Brighton (Brighton, Michigan)
- College: Michigan
- NFL draft: 2003: 6th round, 192nd overall pick
Career history
- Dallas Cowboys (2004–2005); →Rhein Fire (2006); Minnesota Vikings (2006–2007)*; Detroit Lions (2008)
- * Offseason or practice squad member only
Career NFL statistics
- Passing attempts: 20
- Passing completions: 11
- Completion percentage: 55.0%
- TD–INT: 1–1
- Passing yards: 98
- Passer rating: 64.2
- Stats at Pro Football Reference

Drew Daniel Henson (born February 13, 1980) is an American former Major League Baseball (MLB) third baseman and National Football League (NFL) quarterback. He was selected by the Houston Texans in the sixth round of the 2003 NFL draft. He played college football for the Michigan Wolverines.

During his football career, Henson was a member of the Dallas Cowboys, Minnesota Vikings, and Detroit Lions. At the start of his baseball career, he was drafted by the New York Yankees in the third round of the 1998 amateur draft and played for the organization during the 2002 and 2003 seasons until he retired from the sport in 2004. As of 2015, Henson is active in organized baseball as a member of the Yankees' professional scouting staff.

== Early life ==
Drew Henson is the son of Carol (Flynn) Henson and Dan Henson, a former college football coach at San Jose State, Utah, Arizona State, and Eastern Michigan.

Henson attended Brighton High School in Brighton, Michigan, where he starred and received All-state honors in football, basketball, and baseball.

In football, he completed 400 passes for 5,662 yards and 52 touchdowns in three seasons. As a sophomore defensive back, he added 47 tackles and five interceptions, and was also an excellent punter. As a senior, he was named Parade All-American at quarterback and USA Today All-American at punter.

He finished second all-time in Michigan high school annals in passing yards (5,662) and touchdown passes (52). He also had the state's record in touchdown passes for a single-season (26 in 1997) and a single-game (6). He averaged 45.7 yards-per-punt in his career.

In baseball, he was a four-time All-state selection. He finished as the national high school record holder in career home runs (70), RBIs (290) and runs scored (259). As a pitcher, he struck out 163 hitters in his junior season. He had a 14–1 record with a 0.86 ERA and 174 strikeouts in his senior season. He also was named the USA Today High School Player of the Year, Baseball America High School Player of the Year and the Gatorade High School Player of the Year.

== College career ==
Henson, during the recruiting process, was originally planning to commit to Florida State University, but decided against it when Chris Weinke decided to enroll at FSU after a brief stint in Minor League Baseball.

Henson instead accepted a football scholarship from the University of Michigan. As a freshman under head coach Lloyd Carr, Henson battled for the starting quarterback job against Tom Brady and ultimately was named the backup for the 1998 season. He saw action in 8 games, accumulating 21 completions on 47 pass attempts, good for 254 yards, three touchdowns and one interception. He saw action in seven of Michigan's 13 games, including a win over #11 Arkansas in the Citrus Bowl.

In 1999, Brady had to once again hold off Henson for the starting job. The two players platooned during the season's first seven games, with Brady playing the first quarter, Henson the second and Carr then deciding upon a quarterback for the second half. The team started off with a 5–0 record. Against Michigan State, Henson in the second quarter connected with Marcus Knight for the third longest passing play in school history (an 81-yard touchdown completion); so he was chosen to play in the second half; however, Brady was reinserted into the game in the fourth quarter with Michigan down by 17 points, and nearly led the team all the way back before losing 34–31. After a 300-yard passing game the following week, Carr went exclusively with Brady for the remainder of the season. Henson still saw his number of pass attempts nearly double, throwing 90 times and completing 47 passes. He recorded 546 passing yards, along with three touchdowns and two interceptions in nine appearances. Henson again saw limited action when Michigan took on another bowl opponent with a higher ranking, #5 Alabama, in the Orange Bowl, and came out victorious with a 35–34 OT victory.

In 2000, Brady graduated and Henson, now a junior, served as the Wolverines' starting quarterback for most of the season. He missed the first 3 contests after having surgery on his right foot just prior to the start of the season on August 24, with redshirt freshman John Navarre replacing him. Henson threw for a career-high 312 yards in a road loss to #21 Northwestern, 54–51, and also tied a school record with four passing touchdowns. In the regular season finale, Henson led the #19 Wolverines to Columbus to take on #12 Ohio State and threw again for over 300 yards en route to a 38–26 win. For the third time in his career, Michigan and Henson faced a Southeastern Conference team when Michigan went on to play Auburn in the Citrus Bowl and for the third time, Michigan again emerged victorious, winning 31–28. Henson recorded 294 yards passing on just 15 completions to go with two touchdowns and zero interceptions. Henson played in 9 out of 12 games, posting 146 completions in 237 attempts for 2,146 yards, along with 18 touchdowns and four interceptions. His 159.4 passer rating was the fifth best in Michigan history and his 18 touchdown passes were the fourth most in a single-season in school history. He guided the team to a 9–3 record, a share of the Big Ten Conference title and a No. 11 ranking in the final Associated Press Poll.

Henson left prior to his senior season after signing a six-year, $17 million baseball-only deal with the New York Yankees on March 25, 2001. Navarre would replace him as the starting quarterback.

== Baseball career ==
Henson was selected in the third round with the 97th overall selection in the 1998 Major League Baseball draft. He signed a six-year, $17 million contract to forgo the NFL and play exclusively for the Yankees. He began his minor league playing career with the Gulf Coast Yankees in 1998, where he hit .316 (12-for-38) in 10 games.

In 1999, he was promoted to the Tampa Yankees, the Single-A affiliate of the New York Yankees. In his first year of playing, he batted .280 with 13 home runs and 37 RBIs in 69 games.

He began 2000 with Tampa, and after hitting .333, he was promoted to the AA Norwich Navigators and hit seven home runs before he was traded to the Cincinnati Reds with fellow prospects Jackson Melián and Ed Yarnall for Denny Neagle. He finished the summer with the Reds' AA affiliate in Chattanooga, hitting .172 (11-for-64) with one home run and 9 RBIs in 16 games, before returning to football practice at Michigan.

In 2001, he was traded back to the Yankees with Michael Coleman for Wily Mo Pena. However, he struggled at the AAA level Columbus Clippers. He hit .234 over three seasons as the Clippers starting third baseman. Frustrated by his lack of progress and in need of a third baseman at the major league level, the Yankees acquired Aaron Boone at the 2003 trading deadline.

Boone eventually hit a pennant-clinching home run against the Boston Red Sox in the 2003 postseason, but then injured his knee in a pickup basketball game during the offseason. The injury would keep him out for the entire 2004 season.

Henson played a total of eight games in the majors. He received a token call up with the Yankees in 2002 and played in three games. He struck out in his only at-bat. In 2003, he played in five games, going one for eight and scoring two runs. He ended his brief major league career with only one hit in nine at-bats (a .111 average) before announcing his retirement the same year.

After not being considered by the Yankees to replace Boone at third base and with an opportunity looming in the NFL, Henson announced that he was leaving the Yankees in February 2004. He was released from his contracts after being unable to negotiate on the buyout of the $12 million still left on his original contract, forcing him to forgo all of it.

== Football career ==
Pre-draft measurables
Height	Weight
6 ft 4 3/8 in (1.94 m)	223 lb (101 kg)
All values from Pro Day

=== Dallas Cowboys ===
The Houston Texans selected Henson in the sixth round (192nd overall) of the 2003 NFL draft, to own his rights in case he decided to return to the NFL. He would never play for the team.

After retiring from baseball, he returned to football for the 2004 NFL season. On March 19, he was acquired by the Dallas Cowboys after they traded their third round pick (#73-Vernand Morency, a player who coincidentally also spent time playing professional baseball in the Colorado Rockies minor league system) in the 2005 NFL draft to the Texans. It was later reported that owner/general manager Jerry Jones influenced the organization into making the transaction, becoming part of a string of young quarterback acquisitions that were also former baseball players (Quincy Carter and Chad Hutchinson).

After the surprising release of starter Carter on August 4, Henson began the first 6 games of the season as the third-string quarterback behind Tony Romo. He was promoted to the backup position behind veteran Vinny Testaverde in the seventh game against the Detroit Lions. In the tenth game against the Baltimore Ravens, he replaced an injured Testaverde in the fourth quarter, completing all of his 6 passes for 47 yards and one touchdown. On Thanksgiving Day, Testaverde had previously missed practice and was limited with a sore right shoulder, so Henson was given the chance to start his first NFL game against the Chicago Bears, making 4 out of 12 completions for 31 yards, driving the offense for a touchdown on the Cowboys' first possession, but also had one interception that was returned 45 yards for a touchdown in the second quarter. With the score tied at 7, head coach Bill Parcells opted to insert Testaverde in the third quarter and the team went on to win the contest 21–7. Henson returned to third-string in the fifteenth game against the Philadelphia Eagles, finishing the season with 10 out of 18 completions for 78 yards, one touchdown and one interception.

In 2005, Henson had a poor training camp showing and landed third on the depth chart behind Drew Bledsoe and Tony Romo. He was declared inactive for all 16 games and at the end of the season, Parcells announced that Henson would be allocated to NFL Europe league to work on his skills.

In 2006, he was assigned to the Rhein Fire of NFL Europe, where he was named the starter at quarterback. Although he missed week 7 with a knee injury, he was the league's second-rated signal caller (84.2 rating) behind Gibran Hamdan, while finishing the season second in attempts (203), completions (109), passing yards (1,321), passing touchdowns (10) and second fewest interceptions (3). He led the team to a third-place finish behind the Frankfurt Galaxy and the Amsterdam Admirals. He returned to the Cowboys but was waived on August 24, after Parcells decided to keep Bledsoe and Romo as the only two quarterbacks on the roster.

=== Minnesota Vikings ===
On September 27, 2006, Henson was signed to the practice squad of the Minnesota Vikings. He was released on October 10. He was re-signed on December 6.

On March 15, 2007, he was signed to a one-year contract, however, he was cut from the team during training camp on August 27.

=== Detroit Lions ===
On August 22, 2008, Henson was signed by the Detroit Lions as a free agent. He was waived during final cuts on August 30, but was re-signed to the team's practice squad a day later.

Henson was promoted to the active roster on October 12 when quarterback Jon Kitna was declared out for the team's Week 5 contest with an injury. The team released fullback Moran Norris to make room for Henson on the active roster.

Shortly after the signing of quarterback Daunte Culpepper, Henson was waived by the Lions on November 12 when the team claimed wide receiver Adam Jennings off waivers from the Atlanta Falcons. Henson was re-signed to the team's practice squad two days later. On November 24, Henson was signed to a two-year contract off the practice squad to become the backup on the depth chart behind Culpepper. After relieving Culpepper in the 4th quarter of the 2008 Lions' Thanksgiving Day game, Henson was 1-for-2 passing, and fumbled on back-to-back plays. Culpepper also came out of a subsequent game for the final play of the fourth quarter where Henson stepped in and was sacked.

On April 28, 2009, he was released after the Lions selected quarterback Matthew Stafford as the first overall pick in the 2009 NFL draft.

== Football statistics ==
=== Professional ===
Year	Team	GP	Passing							Rushing				
Year	Team	GP	Att	Comp	Pct	Yards	TD	Int	Rtg	Att	Yds	Avg	Lng	TD
2004	DAL	7	18	10	55.6	78	1	1	61.8	1	7	7.0	7	0
2005	DAL	0	DNP											
2006	RHE	10	203	109	53.7	1,321	10	3	84.2	21	8	0.4	6	0
2007	MIN	0	DNP											
2008	DET	2	2	1	50.0	20	0	0	85.4	0	0	-	0	0
NFL totals		9	20	11	55.0	98	1	1	64.2	1	7	7.0	7	0
NFLE totals		10	203	109	53.7	1,321	10	3	84.2	21	8	0.4	6	0

=== College ===
Season	Team	GP	Passing						
Season	Team	GP	Cmp	Att	Pct	Yds	TD	Int	Rtg
1998	Michigan	7	19	45	42.2	233	3	1	103.3
1999	Michigan	9	46	89	51.7	546	3	2	109.8
2000	Michigan	8	131	217	60.4	1,852	16	4	152.7
Totals		24	196	351	55.8	2,631	22	7	135.5

== Personal life ==
Henson's father was a former offensive coordinator at Eastern Michigan University.

== See also ==
- Lists of Michigan Wolverines football passing leaders
- List of multi-sport athletes
- List of athletes who played in Major League Baseball and the National Football League
