= Tommy Hendricks =

American football player (born 1978)

No. 51, 57
- Position: Linebacker

Personal information
- Born: October 23, 1978 (age 48); Houston, Texas, U.S.
- Listed height: 6 ft 2 in (1.88 m)
- Listed weight: 235 lb (107 kg)

Career information
- High school: Scarborough (Houston); Eisenhower (Houston)
- College: Michigan (1996–1999)
- NFL draft: 2000: undrafted

Career history
- Miami Dolphins (2000–2003); Jacksonville Jaguars (2004)

Awards and highlights
- National champion (1997); First-team All-Big Ten (1999); Second-team All-Big Ten (1998)

Career NFL statistics
- Tackles: 113
- Forced fumbles: 1
- Stats at Pro Football Reference

Thomas Emmett Hendricks III (born October 23, 1978) is an American former professional football player who was a linebacker in the National Football League (NFL). He played college football as a defensive back for the Michigan Wolverines from 1996 to 1999 and was a member of the undefeated 1997 Michigan Wolverines football team that was ranked No. 1 in the final AP Poll. He later played in the NFL as a backup linebacker and special teams player for the Miami Dolphins from 2000 to 2003 and the Jacksonville Jaguars during the 2004 season.

== Early life ==
Hendricks was born in Houston, Texas, in 1978. He attended Scarborough High School and Eisenhower High School, both in Houston. He became known as one of the best high school defensive backs in the country while playing for Eisenhower.

== University of Michigan ==
Hendricks's father, Thomas Hendricks Jr., played college football as a halfback at the University of Michigan from 1953 to 1955. Hendricks committed to Michigan in February 1996. He enrolled in the fall of 1996 and played college football as a defensive back for head coach Lloyd Carr's Michigan Wolverines football teams from 1996 to 1999. As a sophomore, Hendricks started all 12 games at free safety for the undefeated 1997 Michigan Wolverines football team that outscored opponents 322–144, won the Big Ten Conference championship, defeated Washington State in the 1998 Rose Bowl, and was ranked #1 in the final AP Poll.

Hendricks also started all 13 games at free safety for Michigan during the 1998 season, and completed a 37-game streak by starting all 12 games at strong safety for the 1999 Michigan team. He was selected by the conference coaches as a first-team defensive back on the 1999 All-Big Ten Conference football team.

In four years at Michigan, Hendricks started 37 games and registered 222 tackles, 12 pass breakups and three interceptions.

== Professional football ==
Hendricks was undrafted in the 2000 NFL draft. He signed as a free agent with the Miami Dolphins where he was converted to a linebacker but cut before the start of the 2000 season. One month after being cut, Miami linebacker Zach Thomas was injured, and Hendricks was re-signed. He was released again a week after being re-signed, joined the Dolphins' developmental squad, and was eventually promoted to the 53-man roster later in 2000. He appeared in eight games in 2000, mostly on special teams.

In his second season with the Dolphins, Hendricks switched from weakside linebacker to middle linebacker. He appeared in all 16 games and got his first start at linebacker following another injury to Zach Thomas. He remained with the Dolphins through the 2003 season, appearing in 56 games, three of them as a starter. He was the team's top backup linebacker and a special teams player. He led the team in special teams tackles in 2001 with 30, 2002 with 26 and 2003. He also served as the team's special teams captain for three seasons from 2001 to 2003.

Hendricks played for the Jacksonville Jaguars during the 2004 season, appearing in 15 games. He started one game at linebacker for the Jaguars.

== NFL career statistics ==
Legend
**Bold**	Career high

=== Regular season ===
Year	Team	Games		Tackles					Interceptions					Fumbles			
Year	Team	GP	GS	Cmb	Solo	Ast	Sck	TFL	Int	Yds	TD	Lng	PD	FF	FR	Yds	TD
2000	MIA	8	0	5	4	1	0.0	0	0	0	0	0	0	0	0	0	0
2001	MIA	**16**	1	23	16	7	0.0	0	0	0	0	0	0	0	0	0	0
2002	MIA	**16**	0	23	15	8	0.0	1	0	0	0	0	0	0	0	0	0
2003	MIA	**16**	**2**	**34**	**24**	**10**	0.0	**2**	0	0	0	0	0	**1**	0	0	0
2004	JAX	15	1	28	22	6	0.0	0	0	0	0	0	0	0	0	0	0
		71	4	113	81	32	0.0	3	0	0	0	0	0	1	0	0	0

=== Playoffs ===
Year	Team	Games		Tackles					Interceptions					Fumbles			
Year	Team	GP	GS	Cmb	Solo	Ast	Sck	TFL	Int	Yds	TD	Lng	PD	FF	FR	Yds	TD
2000	MIA	**2**	0	0	0	0	0.0	0	0	0	0	0	0	0	0	0	0
2001	MIA	1	0	0	0	0	0.0	0	0	0	0	0	0	0	**1**	0	0
		3	0	0	0	0	0.0	0	0	0	0	0	0	0	1	0	0

== Later life ==
Tommy Hendricks now resides in Houston, TX and is now a music producer that has released instrumental albums under the name Hendricks Beats.
