= Hayden Epstein =

American gridiron football player (born 1980)

No. 6
- Positions: Placekicker, punter

Personal information
- Born: November 16, 1980 (age 45); San Diego, California, U.S.
- Listed height: 6 ft 2 in (1.88 m)
- Listed weight: 214 lb (97 kg)

Career information
- High school: Torrey Pines (San Diego)
- College: Michigan
- NFL draft: 2002: 7th round, 247th overall pick

Career history
- Jacksonville Jaguars (2002); Minnesota Vikings (2002); Denver Broncos (2004)*; Berlin Thunder (2004); Edmonton Eskimos (2005); Rhein Fire (2006); Houston Texans (2006)*; Edmonton Eskimos (2008)*
- * Offseason or practice squad member only

Awards and highlights
- World Bowl champion (2004); Second-team All-Big Ten (2001)
- Stats at Pro Football Reference

Hayden Scott Epstein (born November 16, 1980) is an American former professional football player. A placekicker and punter, he played college football for the Michigan Wolverines from 1998 to 2001 and then professional football in the National Football League (NFL), NFL Europe, and Canadian Football League (CFL).

Epstein attended Torrey Pines High School in San Diego, California. He kicked a 58-yard field goal in the 1997 California Interscholastic Federation (CIF) championship game and was rated by various ratings agencies and all-star selection committees as the best kicker in the national high school class of 1998.

As a senior, Epstein led the 2001 Michigan Wolverines in scoring and was selected by conference coaches as a second-team selection on the All-Big Ten team as a placekicker. He tied a Michigan record with a 56-yard field goal in 1999 and broke it with a 57-yard field goal in 2001, both against Michigan State. He played for two Michigan teams that won Big Ten Conference championships.

He was selected by the Jacksonville Jaguars in the seventh round of the 2002 NFL draft. He also played for the Minnesota Vikings, Berlin Thunder, Edmonton Eskimos and Rhein Fire. He played for a Thunder team that won a World Bowl championship.

== Early life ==
Epstein, who is Jewish, was born in San Diego, California. He was a Parade All-American at Torrey Pines High School and honored as the top kicker in the nation by Prep Football Report and PrepStar College Recruiting. In the 1997 CIF Championship game, he kicked a 58-yard field goal. Epstein's 1997 kick was a San Diego section CIF record (tied with Nate Tandberg's 1995 kick) until David Quintero posted a 59-yard kick on September 11, 2015. He participated in the July 25, 1998 47th Annual Shrine All-Star Football Classic of California All-stars against Texas All-stars, but missed two early field goal attempts in a 10–5 victory.

== College career ==
Epstein enrolled at the University of Michigan in 1998 and played college football as a placekicker and punter for head coach Lloyd Carr's Michigan Wolverines football teams from 1998 to 2001. He was successful on 26 of 42 field goals and 85 of 88 extra point attempts. Epstein also averaged 39.9 yards on 167 punts (50 of which were downed inside the 20 yard line) at Michigan. He was a two-time finalist for both the Lou Groza and Ray Guy Awards at Michigan, according to some sources, but the University of Michigan seems to only recognize him as Guy Award finalist as a junior in 2000.

Epstein's freshman season for the 1998 Wolverines was the redshirt 5th year senior season for Michigan placekicker Jay Feely. His only point of the season was a PAT against Eastern Michigan on September 19. Of Epstein's 10 career tackles, his only 2-tackle performance came against Minnesota in the October 31 battle for the Little Brown Jug. Epstein performed punting duties for the team in its final two games against Hawaii and Arkansas (in the 1999 Florida Citrus Bowl), landing 6 of his 9 punts inside the 20 yard line and averaging 40.1 yards per punt. Michigan finished the season as Big Ten Co-champions with Ohio State and Wisconsin.

Jeff Del Verne kicked field goals for the 1999 Wolverines early in the season. In fact, Del Verne led the team in scoring after 5 games. However, on October 9 (in the team's sixth game), Epstein tied Mike Gillette's November 19, 1988, Michigan record for longest field goal with a 56-yard kick against Michigan State in the Michigan–Michigan State football rivalry game. The kick was the longest ever by a Michigan State opponent at the time. It was the first successful field goal of Epstein's Michigan career (following two previous misses). On October 30, 1999, his 20-yard field goal with 18 seconds remaining clinched a 34–31 victory over Indiana for Michigan. That day would be Epstein's highest scoring day as a Wolverine (2–2 FGs and 4–4 in PATs). The game marked the first time that he handled the placekicking, kickoff and punting responsibilities. Of his seven kickoffs 3 were touchbacks and 3 more were covered inside the 20. Epstein punted six times, resulting in his first 50-yard punt and 2 punts landing inside the 20 yard line. For his efforts, he earned his first Big Ten Special Teams Player of the Week award. Epstein was the first player to handle placekicking, kickoff and punting responsibilities for Michigan since Mike Gillette in 1988. In overtime in the January 1, 2000 Orange Bowl against Alabama, his PAT provided the margin of victory (after he missed a 36-yard field goal at the end of regulation time). Epstein finished the season with 36 points (5–8 FGs and 21–22 PATs) and 32 punts for 1282 yards (40.1 average/7 inside 20).

In 2000, Epstein and Del Verne split kicking duties (sometimes in the same game). On September 16, 2000, Epstein missed a 24-yard field goal for the 2000 team with 3:24 remaining against to UCLA. Although Michigan got back within field goal range, John Navarre was intercepted on the 15-yard line and the team lost 23–20. In that game, Epstein, who totalled 400 punt yards on 9 attempts, had landed what would become his career high 5 punts inside UCLA's 20-yard line and executed his first career 60-yard punt. On October 14, he executed a 67-yard punt that was downed inside the 20-yard line and became his career long against Indiana. On November 4, Epstein was thwarted on an attempt to tie the game at the end of regulation when a 57-yard field goal attempt went through the hands of his holder against Northwestern in a 54–51 loss after Northwestern scored a go-ahead touchdown with 20 seconds left. Earlier in the game, he had completed a 6-yard forward pass and a 52-yard field goal. On November 18 against Ohio State in the Michigan–Ohio State football rivalry game, Epstein scored 8 points (a 25-yard field goal and 5 PATs). He dropped 3 of his 6 punts inside the 20 yard line and posted a touchback when kicking off to Ohio State with 1:18 remaining to force them to attempt to drive from their own 20. He earned his second Big Ten Special Teams Player of the Week recognition. Epstein finished the season with 50 points (8–14 FGs and 26–28 PATs) and 55 punts for 2224 yards (40.4 average/19 inside 20). He earned All-Big Ten Conference honorable mention honors by both the coaches and media as a punter and placekicker. Epstein was one of 10 finalists for the inaugural Ray Guy Award. Michigan finished the season as Big Ten Co-champions with Purdue and Northwestern.

When Epstein's field goal attempt for the 2001 Wolverines was blocked on September 8 with 9:11 remaining against Washington and run back for a touchdown, it gave the Huskies a lead that they would not relinquish on the way to a 23–18 game. Epstein made a 51-yard field goal against Iowa on October 27 to give Michigan a 6-point lead with 3:57 remaining. The 32–26 score held up. He posted a school record 57-yard field goal against Michigan State in the November 3, 2001 Michigan–Michigan State football rivalry game known as Clockgate. However, later in the game, Epstein's short punt and two Michigan penalties, made way for Michigan State's controversial game-winning drive. He made the game-winning 31-yard field goal against the Wisconsin on November 17, 2001, with 10 seconds left. Epstein set up the field goal when his punt bounced off of Badger Brett Bell and was recovered by Brandon Williams with 14 seconds left. In the game 3 of his 8 punts were downed inside the 20 yard line, including a 48-yarder that was downed on the 1-yard-line to set up Michigan's first score. 3 of his 5 kickoffs were touchbacks and a fourth one into the end zone was just returned 15 yards. Epstein's performance earned him Big Ten Special Teams Player of the Week recognition and his 8 points (2 FGs and 2 PATs) gave him the team scoring lead with 69 points. He finished the season with 76 points (13–20 FGs and 37–37 PATs) and 71 punts for 2790 yards (39.3 average/17 inside 20). Epstein's single-season punt yardage total was a school record that was surpassed the following season by Adam Finley. His 76 points just edged out B. J. Askew's 72 points and Marquise Walker's 68 points. Epstein earned All-Big Ten Conference second-team honors as a placekicker from the coaches and honorable mention honors by both the coaches and media as a punter. He concluded his career by making 2 field goals in the January 26, 2002 Senior Bowl.

== Professional career ==
Epstein was selected by the Jacksonville Jaguars in the 2002 NFL draft and played in six games with the Jaguars in the 2002 NFL season before being picked up off waivers by the Minnesota Vikings on October 23, 2002, where he was a kickoff specialist for the remainder of the season. Epstein tore his anterior cruciate ligament with one week remaining in the 2002 season and had offseason surgery. Despite being reactivated during the 2003 preseason, he was released before the 2003 season. 43-year-old Gary Anderson performed the PATs and field goals for the 2002 Vikings. Anderson, had been brought out of retirement during the season to contribute to the Vikings' special teams efforts as Doug Brien faltered. Epstein replaced Brien. As a Jaguar, Epstein made 5 out of 9 field goals (with a long of 34 yards) and 13 PATs. He was 0–4 on field goals of 39 yards or longer. Of his 72 career kickoffs, 10 of them were touchbacks and his average distance was 61.7 yards. After Epstein was released, the Jaguars continued to have troubles as his successor Tim Seder was cut five games later. 8 of Epstein's 28 career points came in a 28–25 October 6, 2002 Jacksonville victory over Philadelphia. He was 2-for-2 on both field goals and PATs.

The Denver Broncos signed Epstein in February 2004 and assigned him to the Berlin Thunder of NFL Europe. He was released in September 2004. He was the punter and performed kickoffs for the World Bowl XII champion 2004 Thunder team, although Jonathan Ruffin performed field goal attempts for them.

The Edmonton Eskimos of the Canadian Football League signed Epstein during the 2005 CFL season. He appeared in four regular season games for Edmonton, made 8 of 12 field goal attempts, and punted 16 times for an average of 41 yards (37 m) but that record and especially a blocked kick on September 18, his final game for the Eskimos, resulted in his release on September 29. Edmonton went on to win the 93rd Grey Cup.

The Houston Texans signed him in January 2006 and assigned him to the Rhein Fire of NFL Europe. He was released in May 2006. On February 6, 2008, Epstein signed back on with the Edmonton Eskimos of the CFL, but he was released again on April 28.

== See also ==
- List of Jewish football players
