= Ian Gold =

American football player (born 1978)

No. 52
- Position: Linebacker

Personal information
- Born: August 23, 1978 (age 48); Ann Arbor, Michigan, U.S.
- Listed height: 6 ft 0 in (1.83 m)
- Listed weight: 223 lb (101 kg)

Career information
- High school: Belleville (MI)
- College: Michigan
- NFL draft: 2000: 2nd round, 40th overall pick

Career history
- Denver Broncos (2000–2003); Tampa Bay Buccaneers (2004); Denver Broncos (2005–2007)

Awards and highlights
- Pro Bowl (2001); National champion (1997); First-team All-Big Ten (1999); Second-team All-Big Ten (1998)

Career NFL statistics
- Total tackles: 527
- Sacks: 17
- Forced fumbles: 9
- Fumble recoveries: 10
- Interceptions: 4
- Defensive touchdowns: 2
- Stats at Pro Football Reference

Ian Maurice Gold (born August 23, 1978) is an American former professional football player who played as a linebacker for eight seasons in the National Football League (NFL). He played for the Denver Broncos from 2000 to 2003 and 2004 to 2007 and for the Tampa Bay Buccaneers in 2004. He appeared in 115 NFL games, 80 as a starter, registered 422 tackles, and was selected to play in the 2002 Pro Bowl.

Gold played college football for the Michigan Wolverines from 1996 to 1999 and was a member of the undefeated 1997 Michigan Wolverines football team that was ranked #1 in the final AP Poll. He was selected as a first-team linebacker on both the 1998 and 1999 All-Big Ten teams.

== Early life ==
In August 1978, Gold was born at University Hospital in Ann Arbor, Michigan, where his parents were both students at the University of Michigan. He attended middle school in Ann Arbor, Michigan. In middle school, he developed a passion for the arts, while enjoying time with his friends. As a high school senior in 1995, Gold rushed for 950 yards and 21 TDs on 98 carries, giving him an average of 9.6 yards per rush. Gold earned All-West Wayne Offensive MVP and was selected to the Detroit News All-State Dream Team after his senior campaign.

== University of Michigan ==
Gold enrolled at the University of Michigan in 1996 and played college football for head coach Lloyd Carr's Michigan Wolverines football teams from 1996 to 1999.

As a sophomore, Gold started one game at inside linebacker for the undefeated 1997 Michigan Wolverines football team that outscored opponents 322–144, won the Big Ten Conference championship, defeated Washington State in the 1998 Rose Bowl, and was ranked #1 in the final AP Poll. Gold had 34 tackles in 1997, including three solo tackles in the 1998 Rose Bowl.

Gold started eight games at inside linebacker in 1998, and then, as a senior, started all 12 games at the position for the 1999 Michigan team that compiled a 10–2 record and was ranked #5 in the final AP and ESPN/Coaches Polls. Gold led the 1999 team with 95 tackles, including 71 solo tackles, and was selected by the conference coaches as a first-team linebacker on the 1999 All-Big Ten Conference football team. He won the 1999 Roger Zatkoff Award as the team's top linebacker.

== Professional football ==
Gold was selected by the Denver Broncos in the second round (40th overall pick) of the 2000 NFL draft. He appeared in all 32 regular season games for the Broncos in 2000 and 2001, but was not a starter. In 2002, Gold started all 16 games at weakside linebacker and totaled 85 tackles and 6.5 quarterback sacks. Gold began the 2003 season on a strong note with 10 tackles and his first career interception return for a touchdown in the opening game against the Cincinnati Bengals. However, he sustained an anterior cruciate ligament injury in his right leg on a special teams play during the sixth game of the 2003 season against the Pittsburgh Steelers. He missed the remainder of the season and underwent surgery to repair the injury.

In April 2004, the Broncos stopped contract negotiations with Gold after drafting D. J. Williams in the first round of the 2004 NFL draft. Four days later, Gold signed as a free agent with the Tampa Bay Buccaneers. The contract was for seven years and $38 million with a $1.3 million signing bonus, though the contract only guaranteed the signing bonus and gave the team the option to release him after the 2004 season. Gold appeared in all 16 games for the Buccaneers, including 13 as the team's starting strongside linebacker. In early March 2005, the Buccaneers cut Gold to the free agent market rather than pay him a reported $9.6 million option bonus.

After being cut by the Buccaneers, Gold re-joined the Broncos in March 2005. He appeared in all 16 regular season games and registered 72 tackles and three sacks. He helped lead the 2005 Broncos to a 13–3 record and a spot in the AFC Championship Game. He remained with the Broncos for two more seasons, starting 15 games in 2006 and 14 games in 2007. On February 29, 2008, the Broncos released him after three seasons.

== NFL career statistics ==
Legend
**Bold**	Career high

=== Regular season ===
Year	Team	Games		Tackles					Interceptions					Fumbles			
Year	Team	GP	GS	Cmb	Solo	Ast	Sck	TFL	Int	Yds	TD	Lng	PD	FF	FR	Yds	TD
2000	DEN	**16**	0	30	25	5	2.0	1	0	0	0	0	1	1	**2**	0	0
2001	DEN	**16**	0	42	37	5	3.0	2	0	0	0	0	3	1	**2**	0	0
2002	DEN	**16**	**16**	**100**	**85**	15	**6.5**	0	0	0	0	0	4	1	**2**	**18**	0
2003	DEN	6	6	31	30	1	0.0	6	**2**	14	**1**	12	**6**	0	0	0	0
2004	TAM	**16**	13	71	54	17	0.5	4	1	**31**	0	**31**	3	0	0	0	0
2005	DEN	**16**	**16**	90	74	16	3.0	**12**	0	0	0	0	4	**4**	**2**	0	0
2006	DEN	15	15	91	70	**21**	0.0	4	0	0	0	0	4	1	0	0	0
2007	DEN	14	14	72	61	11	2.0	4	1	6	0	6	5	1	**2**	0	0
		115	80	527	436	91	17.0	43	4	51	1	31	30	9	10	18	0

=== Playoffs ===
Year	Team	Games		Tackles					Interceptions					Fumbles			
Year	Team	GP	GS	Cmb	Solo	Ast	Sck	TFL	Int	Yds	TD	Lng	PD	FF	FR	Yds	TD
2000	DEN	1	0	1	1	0	0.0	**1**	0	0	0	0	0	0	0	0	0
2005	DEN	**2**	**2**	**10**	**7**	**3**	0.0	0	0	0	0	0	0	0	**1**	0	0
		3	2	11	8	3	0.0	1	0	0	0	0	0	0	1	0	0

== Later life ==
In 2012, Gold's autobiography, "Plant Water Grow" was published.
