= 1999 All-Big Ten Conference football team =

American college football all-star team

The 1999 All-Big Ten Conference football team consists of American football players chosen as All-Big Ten Conference players for the 1999 NCAA Division I-A football season. The conference recognizes two official All-Big Ten selectors: (1) the Big Ten conference coaches selected separate offensive and defensive units and named first- and second-team players (the "Coaches" team); and (2) a panel of sports writers and broadcasters covering the Big Ten also selected offensive and defensive units and named first- and second-team players (the "Media" team).

== Offensive selections ==
=== Quarterbacks ===
- Drew Brees, Purdue (Coaches-1; Media-1)
- Antwaan Randle El, Indiana (Coaches-2; Media-2)

=== Running backs ===
- Ron Dayne, Wisconsin (Coaches-1; Media-1)
- Thomas Hamner, Minnesota (Coaches-1; Media-1)
- Anthony Thomas, Michigan (Coaches-2; Media-2)
- Ladell Betts, Iowa (Coaches-2)
- Damien Anderson, Northwestern (Media-2)

=== Receivers ===
- Plaxico Burress, Michigan State (Coaches-1; Media-1)
- David Terrell, Michigan (Coaches-1; Media-2)
- Chris Daniels, Purdue (Coaches-2; Media-1)
- Chafie Fields, Penn State (Coaches-2)
- Marcus Knight, Michigan (Media-2)

=== Centers ===
- Ben Hamilton, Minnesota (Coaches-1; Media-2)
- Casey Rabach, Wisconsin (Coaches-2; Media-1)

=== Guards ===
- Bill Ferrario, Wisconsin (Coaches-1; Media-1)
- Steve Hutchinson, Michigan (Coaches-1; Media-1)
- Shaun Mason, Michigan State (Coaches-2; Media-2)
- Ray Redziniak, Illinois (Coaches-2)
- Eric Cole, Penn State (Media-2)

=== Tackles ===
- Chris McIntosh, Wisconsin (Coaches-1; Media-1)
- Kareem McKenzie, Penn State (Coaches-1; Media-2)
- Jeff Backus, Michigan (Coaches-2; Media-1)
- Marques Sullivan, Illinois (Coaches-2)
- Matt Light, Purdue (Media-2)

=== Tight ends ===
- Tim Stratton, Purdue (Coaches-1; Media-1)
- Chris Baker, Michigan State (Coaches-2; Media-2)

== Defensive selections ==
=== Defensive linemen ===
- Courtney Brown, Penn State (Coaches-1; Media-1)
- Rob Renes, Michigan (Coaches-1; Media-1)
- Robaire Smith, Michigan State (Coaches-1; Media-1)
- Wendell Bryant, Wisconsin (Coaches-1; Media-2)
- Karon Riley, Minnesota (Coaches-2; Media-1)
- Dwayne Missouri, Northwestern (Coaches-2; Media-2)
- John Schlecht, Minnesota (Coaches-2; Media-2)
- David Nugent, Purdue (Coaches-2)
- Adewale Ogunleye, Indiana (Coaches-2)
- Akin Ayodele, Purdue (Media-2)

=== Linebackers ===
- LaVar Arrington, Penn State (Coaches-1; Media-1)
- Brandon Short, Penn State (Coaches-1; Media-1)
- Ian Gold, Michigan (Coaches-1; Media-2)
- Julian Peterson, Michigan State (Coaches-2; Media-1)
- Na'il Diggs, Ohio State (Coaches-2; Media-2)
- Dhani Jones, Michigan (Coaches-2)
- Kevin Bentley, Northwestern (Media-2)

=== Defensive backs ===
- Amp Campbell, Michigan State (Coaches-1; Media-1)
- Tyrone Carter, Minnesota (Coaches-1; Media-1)
- Jamar Fletcher, Wisconsin (Coaches-1; Media-1)
- Ahmed Plummer, Ohio State (Coaches-2; Media-1)
- Tommy Hendricks, Michigan (Coaches-1)
- David Macklin, Penn State (Coaches-2; Media-2)
- Aric Morris, Michigan State (Coaches-2; Media-2)
- Willie Middlebrooks, Minnesota (Coaches-2)
- Adrian Beasley, Purdue (Media-2)
- Matt Bowen, Iowa (Media-2)

== Special teams ==
=== Kickers ===
- Vitaly Pisetsky, Wisconsin (Coaches-1; Media-1)
- Paul Edinger, Michigan State (Coaches-2; Media-2)

=== Punters ===
- Craig Jarrett, Michigan State (Coaches-1; Media-2)
- Drew Hagan, Indiana (Coaches-2; Media-1)

== Key ==
Bold = selected as a first-team player by both the coaches and media panel

Coaches = selected by Big Ten Conference coaches

Media = selected by a media panel

== See also ==
- 1999 College Football All-America Team
