= Bennie Joppru =

American football player (born 1980)

No. 83, 47
- Position: Tight end

Personal information
- Born: January 5, 1980 (age 46); Dickinson, North Dakota, U.S.
- Listed height: 6 ft 5 in (1.96 m)
- Listed weight: 260 lb (118 kg)

Career information
- High school: Minnetonka (Minnetonka, Minnesota)
- College: Michigan
- NFL draft: 2003: 2nd round, 41st overall pick

Career history
- Houston Texans (2003–2006); Chicago Bears (2006)*; Seattle Seahawks (2006–2007)
- * Offseason or practice squad member only

Awards and highlights
- First-team All-American (2002); Second-team All-Big Ten (2002)
- Stats at Pro Football Reference

Benjamin Paul Joppru (born January 5, 1980) is an American former professional football player who was a tight end in the National Football League (NFL). He played college football for the Michigan Wolverines, earning All-American honors. Joppru was selected by the Houston Texans in the second round of the 2003 NFL draft, He was also a member of the Seattle Seahawks and the Chicago Bears.

== College career ==
In 2002, his senior season at Michigan, Joppru had 53 receptions for 579 yards and 5 touchdowns, setting a single-season school record for receptions by a tight end. For his efforts he was named a first-team All-American by Pro Football Weekly, and a third-team selection by the AP. In his career at Michigan Joppru started 24 games, ending his career with 85 receptions for 800 yards and eight touchdowns.

== Professional career ==
Pre-draft measurables
Height	Weight	Arm length	Hand span	Vertical jump	Broad jump	Bench press
6 ft 4 in (1.93 m)	272 lb (123 kg)	32 1/4 in (0.82 m)	10 in (0.25 m)	30 1/2 in (0.77 m)	9 ft 1 in (2.77 m)	19 reps
All values from NFL Combine.

After being drafted, Joppru spent his first four NFL seasons with the Texans. Following his tenure in Houston, the Chicago Bears signed Joppru to their practice squad on October 10, 2006. However, in November 2006, the Seattle Seahawks signed Joppru from the Bears' practice squad.

== Personal life ==
Joppru's father, Sheldon played in the World Football League for the Shreveport Steamer and the Detroit Wheels. His brother, J. J., played defensive line at Fullerton College before going to the University of Arizona. Another brother, Chris, was the starting tight end for the undefeated 2008 Utah Utes football team.

== See also ==
- Lists of Michigan Wolverines football receiving leaders
