= 1999 All-America college football team =

Official list of the best college football players of 1999

The 1999 All-America college football team is composed of the following All-American Teams: Associated Press, Football Writers Association of America, American Football Coaches Association, Walter Camp Foundation, The Sporting News, Pro Football Weekly, Football News, and CNNSI.com.

The College Football All-America Team is an honor given annually to the best American college football players at their respective positions. The original usage of the term All-America seems to have been to such a list selected by football pioneer Walter Camp in the 1890s. The NCAA officially recognizes All-Americans selected by the AP, AFCA, FWAA, TSN, and the WCFF to determine Consensus All-Americans.

== Offense ==
=== Quarterback ===
- Joe Hamilton, Georgia Tech (AFCA, AP-1, FWAA, Walter Camp, PFW, CNNSI)
- Michael Vick, Virginia Tech (TSN, FN, AP-2)
- Drew Brees, Purdue (AP-3)

=== Running back ===
- Ron Dayne, Wisconsin (AFCA, AP-1, FWAA, TSN, Walter Camp, PFW, FN)
- Thomas Jones, Virginia (AP-1, FWAA, TSN, Walter Camp, PFW, FN, CNNSI)
- Shaun Alexander, Alabama (AFCA, CNNSI, AP-2)
- LaDainian Tomlinson, TCU (AP-2)
- Trung Canidate, Arizona (AP-3)
- Travis Prentice, Miami (OH) (AP-3)

=== Wide receiver ===
- Peter Warrick, Florida State (AFCA, AP-1, FWAA, TSN, Walter Camp, PFW, FN, CNNSI)
- Troy Walters, Stanford (AP-1, FWAA, TSN, Walter Camp, PFW, FN, CNNSI)
- Dennis Northcutt, Arizona (AFCA)
- Kwame Cavil, Texas (AP-2)
- Trevor Insley, Nevada (AP-2)
- Chris Daniels, Purdue (AP-3)
- Anthony Lucas, Arkansas (AP-3)

=== Tight end ===
- James Whalen, Kentucky (AP-1, FWAA, Walter Camp, CNNSI)
- Bubba Franks, Miami (FL) (TSN, PFW, FN, AP-2)
- Ibn Green, Louisville (AFCA)
- Todd Heap, Arizona State (AP-3)

=== Tackle ===
- Chris McIntosh, Wisconsin (AFCA, AP-1, FWAA, TSN, Walter Camp, PFW, FN, CNNSI)
- Chris Samuels, Alabama (AFCA, AP-1, FWAA, TSN, Walter Camp, PFW, FN, CNNSI)
- Marvel Smith, Arizona State (FN, AP-2)
- Jon Carman, Georgia Tech (AP-3)
- Stockar McDougle, Oklahoma (AP-3)

=== Guard ===
- Cosey Coleman, Tennessee (AFCA, AP-1, FWAA, Walter Camp, FN)
- Jason Whitaker, Florida State (AFCA, AP-1, Walter Camp, FN)
- Brad Bedell, Colorado (FWAA, AP-2)
- Noel LaMontagne, Virginia (TSN)
- Richard Mercier, Miami (FL) (TSN, PFW, AP-2)
- Steve Hutchinson, Michigan (PFW, CNNSI, AP-2)
- Dominic Raiola, Nebraska (CNNSI)
- Travis Claridge, USC (AP-3)
- Roger Roesler, Texas (AP-3)

=== Center ===
- Ben Hamilton, Minnesota (AP-1, TSN)
- Rob Riti, Missouri (AFCA, Walter Camp)
- Mike Malano, San Diego State (FWAA, AP-2)
- John St. Clair, Virginia(CNNSI, PFW)
- Terrence Anderson, Navy (AP-3)

== Defense ==
=== End ===
- Courtney Brown, Penn State (AFCA, AP-1, FWAA, TSN, Walter Camp, PFW, FN, CNNSI)
- Corey Moore, Virginia Tech (AFCA, AP-1, FWAA, TSN, Walter Camp, PFW, FN, CNNSI)
- Alex Brown, Florida (Walter Camp, FN, AP-2)
- John Engelberger, Virginia Tech (AP-2)
- Darren Howard, Kansas State (AP-3)

=== Tackle ===
- Corey Simon, Florida State (AFCA, AP-1, FWAA, TSN, Walter Camp, PFW, CNNSI)
- Casey Hampton, Texas (AP-1, FWAA, FN)
- Chris Hovan, Boston College (AFCA, PFW, CNNSI, AP-2)
- Rob Renes, Michigan (TSN, AP-3)
- Adalius Thomas, Southern Miss (AP-2)
- Kendrick Clancy, Mississippi (AP-3)
- Darwin Walker, Tennessee (AP-3)

=== Linebacker ===
- LaVar Arrington, Penn State (AFCA, AP-1, FWAA, TSN, Walter Camp, PFW, FN, CNNSI)
- Mark Simoneau, Kansas State (AFCA, AP-1, FWAA, TSN, Walter Camp, CNNSI)
- Brandon Short, Penn State (AP-1, FWAA, Walter Camp)
- Rob Morris, BYU (AP-2, TSN, FN)
- Raynoch Thompson, Tennessee (AFCA, AP-1, PFW, CNNSI)
- Barrin Simpson, Mississippi State (TSN)
- Keith Bulluck, Syracuse (PFW, AP-3)
- Na'il Diggs, Ohio State (FN, AP-3)
- Julian Peterson, Michigan State (FN, AP-3)
- Keith Adams, Clemson (FN, AP-2)
- Jamel Smith, Virginia Tech (AP-2)
- Nate Webster, Miami (AP-2)
- James Hall, Michigan (AP-3)

=== Cornerback ===
- Deltha O'Neal, California (AFCA, AP-1, FWAA, CNNSI)
- Ralph Brown, Nebraska (Walter Camp, TSN, FN, AP-2)
- Mike Brown, Nebraska (AP-1, FWAA)
- Jamar Fletcher, Wisconsin (TSN, PFW, FN. CNNSI, AP-2)
- Ike Charlton, Virginia Tech (PFW)
- Ben Kelly, Colorado (FN)
- Amp Campbell, Michigan State (AP-3)
- Ashley Cooper, Mississippi State (AP-3)
- Lloyd Harrison, NC State (AP-3)

=== Safety ===
- Tyrone Carter, Minnesota (AFCA, AP-1, FWAA, TSN, Walter Camp, CNNSI)
- Deon Grant, Tennessee (AFCA, TSN, Walter Camp, PFW, FN, CNNSI, AP-2)
- Brian Urlacher, New Mexico (AFCA, AP-1, FWAA, Walter Camp, PFW)
- Rodregis Brooks, UAB (AP-2)
- Kenoy Kennedy, Arkansas (AP-3)

== Special teams ==
=== Kicker ===
- Sebastian Janikowski, Florida State (AFCA, AP-1, FWAA, TSN, Walter Camp, PFW, FN, CNNSI)
- Jeff Chandler, Florida (AP-2)
- Jamie Rheem, Kansas State (AP-3)

=== Punter ===
- Andrew Bayes, East Carolina (AFCA, FWAA, Walter Camp, FN, CNNSI, AP-2)
- Shane Lechler, Texas A&M (AP-1, PFW)
- Brian Schmitz, North Carolina (TSN, AP-3)

=== All-purpose player / return specialist ===
- Dennis Northcutt, Arizona (AP-1, FWAA, CNNSI-AP)
- David Allen, Kansas State (AFCA, CNNSI-PR, AP-2)
- Deltha O'Neal, California (TSN, PFW, FN)
- Ben Kelly, Colorado(CNNSI-KR, AP-3)

== See also ==
- 1999 All-Atlantic Coast Conference football team
- 1999 All-Big 12 Conference football team
- 1999 All-Big Ten Conference football team
- 1999 All-Pacific-10 Conference football team
- 1999 All-SEC football team
