= Rob Renes =

American football player (born 1977)

Michigan Wolverines
- Position: Nose tackle

Personal information
- Born: March 28, 1977 (age 49); Holland, Michigan, U.S.

Career information
- College: Michigan (1997–1999)

Awards and highlights
- National champion (1997); First-team All-American (1999); First-team All-Big Ten (1999); Second-team All-Big Ten (1998)

Rob Renes (born March 28, 1977) is an American former college football player who was a nose tackle for the Michigan Wolverines. He was a first-team All-American and team co-captain in 1999.

== College career ==
At the University of Michigan in 1999, Renes became the fifth Wolverine to be named both a first-team All-American on the field and an Academic All-American for his academic performance. He was selected by The Sporting News as a first-team All-American. At Michigan he had 151 tackles, 24 tackles for loss, five sacks, and three fumble recoveries. He was selected to the Academic All-Big Ten Conference team all four years at Michigan. He was also a two-time recipient of the Dr. Arthur Robinson Scholar Athlete as the best scholar-athlete on the Michigan team. In his senior year, Renes was also selected as a team co-captain and a semi-finalist for the Lombardi Award.

== Professional career ==
Renes was selected by the Indianapolis Colts in the seventh round of the 2000 NFL draft. Two weeks into training camp with the Colts in 2000, Renes was diagnosed with a fractured L-5 vertebrae and was later placed on injured reserve. A back injury ended his NFL career. He wore a back brace for more than a year, was waived by the Colts, and began teaching at Saline Middle School near Ann Arbor. In 2002, Renes attempted a comeback with the Colts, but he suffered numbness from nerve damage and was unable to continue playing football. After his unsuccessful comeback attempt, Renes told his hometown newspaper, the Holland Sentinel: "I realized that I pushed it to the brink and feel good about the opportunities that I've had. Having this (back injury) really seals the deal. It just wasn't meant to be."

== Current career ==
Renes now serves as the assistant superintendent at Reeths-Puffer Schools
