= David Terrell (wide receiver) =

American football player (born 1979)

No. 83, 13
- Position: Wide receiver

Personal information
- Born: March 13, 1979 (age 47); Richmond, Virginia, U.S.
- Listed height: 6 ft 2 in (1.88 m)
- Listed weight: 216 lb (98 kg)

Career information
- High school: Huguenot (Richmond)
- College: Michigan (1998–2000)
- NFL draft: 2001: 1st round, 8th overall pick

Career history
- Chicago Bears (2001–2004); New England Patriots (2005)*; Denver Broncos (2005); Denver Broncos (2007)*
- * Offseason or practice squad member only

Awards and highlights
- Second-team All-American (2000); 2× First-team All-Big Ten (1999, 2000); Orange Bowl MVP (2000)

Career NFL statistics
- Receptions: 128
- Receiving yards: 1,602
- Receiving touchdowns: 9
- Stats at Pro Football Reference

David Terrell (born March 13, 1979) is an American former professional football player who was a wide receiver in the National Football League (NFL). After playing college football for the Michigan Wolverines, he was selected as the eighth pick in the first round of the 2001 NFL draft by the Chicago Bears. He played five seasons, during which he caught nine touchdown passes.

== Early life ==
Terrell attended Huguenot High School in Richmond, Virginia and was a two-sport star in football and basketball. He was named 1st Team Utility Player of the Year by USA Today.

== College career ==
A three-year letterman and two-year starter at wide receiver for the University of Michigan, Terrell played in 37 games and made 21 starts before declaring for the NFL draft as junior. A two-time All-Big Ten Conference selection, Terrell was named to the 2000 College Football News and CNN/Sports Illustrated All-America first-team squads. He became the first player in Michigan history to have multiple 1,000-yard receiving seasons (1,130 yards in 2000 and 1,038 in 1999). Terrell finished his career with a school record 1,130 receiving yards on 67 receptions and scored 14 touchdowns in 2000. He capped an outstanding sophomore campaign by being named the FedEx Orange Bowl MVP after setting career highs with 10 receptions for 150 yards and three tds. He caught 71 passes for 1,038 yards and scored seven touchdowns as a sophomore. A native of Richmond, Virginia, Terrell was the eighth overall pick of the 2001 NFL draft by the Chicago Bears.

As a freshman and sophomore, Terrell also saw time at defensive back as a two-way player. He ultimately appeared in 6 games on defense with 8 tackles, 2 pass break ups, and an interception.

== Professional career ==
Terrell was drafted by the Chicago Bears with the eighth overall pick in the 2001 NFL draft. He was later cut by the Bears, and he attempted to come back with both the New England Patriots and Denver Broncos. After signing a one-year contract with the Denver Broncos on April 12, 2007, Terrell was cut by the team on August 27, 2007. In August 2009, Terrell tried out for the Kansas City Chiefs, but Amani Toomer was signed instead.

=== NFL statistics ===
Year	Team	Games	Rec	Yds	Avg	Lng	TD	FD	Fum	FumL
2001	CHI	16	34	415	12.2	62	4	20	0	0
2002	CHI	5	9	127	14.1	52	3	7	0	0
2003	CHI	16	43	361	8.4	35	1	19	1	0
2004	CHI	16	42	699	16.6	63	1	35	0	0
Career		53	128	1,602	12.5	63	9	81	1	0

== Personal life ==
On August 19, 2013, Terrell was arrested and charged with a felony for distribution of marijuana and misdemeanor battery. On February 16, 2014, he was acquitted on all charges.
