= Bobby Morrison (American football) =

American football player and coach (1945–2024)

Biographical details
- Born: April 24, 1945; Youngstown, Ohio, U.S.
- Died: December 8, 2024 (aged 79); Ann Arbor, Michigan, U.S.
- Education: Findlay College (1967)

Playing career
- 1963–1966: Findlay
- Position: Linebacker

Coaching career (HC unless noted)
- 1967–1969: Bowling Green (GA)
- 1970–1973: William & Mary (LB)
- 1974: VMI (LB)
- 1975: VMI (OG/C)
- 1976–1979: NC State (assistant)
- 1980–1981: LSU (ILB)
- 1982–1986: Navy (DC)
- 1987–1994: Michigan (OLB)
- 1995: Michigan (OL)
- 1996: Michigan (OL/RC)
- 1997–2002: Michigan (ST/RC)

Bobby Morrison (April 24, 1945 – December 8, 2024) was an American college football coach. Morrison played collegiately at Findlay College. He coached for 31 years at seven programs, including Virginia, William & Mary, VMI, North Carolina State, LSU, Navy, and Michigan.

== Player ==
Morrison was born in Youngstown, Ohio, and graduated from Findlay College in 1967. He was a linebacker for the Findlay football team.

== Coach ==
In the early 1970s, Morrison was the linebackers coach at William & Mary under Lou Holtz and Jim Root. During the 1974 and 1975 seasons, he was an assistant coach in charge of linebackers and, later, offensive guards and centers at the Virginia Military Institute. In March 1976, he was hired as an assistant coach at North Carolina State under Bo Rein, who succeeded Holtz in Raleigh after the latter took the head coaching position with the National Football League's New York Jets.

In December 1979, when Rein left NC State for LSU to succeed Charles McClendon, he brought six of his assistant coaches, including Morrison, with him. Although Rein perished in a plane crash only 42 days after accepting the LSU post, Morrison was retained by Jerry Stovall and coached the Bayou Bengals' inside linebackers for two seasons.

In 1982, Morrison joined the coaching staff at Navy and became the team's defensive coordinator. His defensive backs coach during his first season in Annapolis was Nick Saban, who went on to win seven national championships as head coach at LSU and Alabama. Morrison remained at Navy through the 1986 season.

He was an assistant football coach at the University of Michigan from 1987 to 2002. Hired in 1987 by Bo Schembechler, he served as the team's outside linebackers coach (1987–1994), offensive line coach (1995–1996), recruiting coordinator (1996–2002), and special teams coach (1997–2002). As Michigan's recruiting coordinator, he helped Michigan secure recruiting classes ranked in the top ten nationally in seven of eight years, including the top-rated recruiting class in 1998.

== Death ==
Morrison died in Ann Arbor, Michigan, on December 8, 2024, at the age of 79.
