= Marcus Knight =

American football player and coach (born 1978)

Yale Bulldogs
- Title: Wide receivers coach

Personal information
- Born: June 19, 1978 (age 48); Sylacauga, Alabama, U.S.
- Listed height: 6 ft 1 in (1.85 m)
- Listed weight: 180 lb (82 kg)

Career information
- Position: Wide receiver (No. 83)
- High school: B.B. Comer (Sylacauga, Alabama)
- College: Michigan
- NFL draft: 2000: undrafted

Career history

Playing
- Oakland Raiders (2000–2002); → Amsterdam Admirals (2002); Tampa Bay Buccaneers (2004); Philadelphia Soul (2005–2006); Columbus Destroyers (2006–2007)

Coaching
- Valparaiso (2008–2011) Wide receivers coach; Northern Michigan (2012–2016) Wide receivers coach & recruiting coordinator; Central Michigan (2017–2018) Wide receivers coach; Indiana State (2019) Running backs coach; Indiana State (2020) Wide receivers coach; Ball State (2021–2022) Wide receivers coach; Yale (2023–present) Wide receivers coach

Awards and highlights
- AP National Champion (1997); Second-team All-Big Ten (1999); John F. Maulbetsch Award (1997)

Career NFL statistics
- Receptions: 3
- Receiving yards: 26
- Stats at Pro Football Reference
- Stats at ArenaFan.com

Marcus Larae Knight (born June 19, 1978) is an American college football coach and former wide receiver. He is the wide receivers coach at Yale University, a position he has held since 2023. He played college football at Michigan and professionally as a wide receiver and kick returner for the Oakland Raiders of the NFL and wide receiver and defensive back for the Philadelphia Soul and Columbus Destroyers of the Arena Football League (AFL).

Marcus Knight retired from playing in 2008 and was hired by Valparaiso University as the wide receivers coach.

Knight's nephew, Zelous Wheeler, is a professional baseball player.
