= Jay Riemersma =

American football player (born 1973)

No. 85
- Position: Tight end

Personal information
- Born: May 17, 1973 (age 53); Evansville, Indiana, U.S.
- Listed height: 6 ft 5 in (1.96 m)
- Listed weight: 255 lb (116 kg)

Career information
- High school: Zeeland (Zeeland, Michigan)
- College: Michigan
- NFL draft: 1996: 7th round, 244th overall pick

Career history
- Buffalo Bills (1996–2002); Pittsburgh Steelers (2003–2004)

Career NFL statistics
- Receptions: 221
- Receiving yards: 2,524
- Receiving touchdowns: 23
- Stats at Pro Football Reference

Allen Jay Riemersma (born May 17, 1973) is an American former professional football player who was a tight end in the National Football League (NFL). He played college basketball for the Michigan Wolverines from 1994 to 1995. He played nine seasons in the NFL for the Buffalo Bills from 1996 to 2002 and Pittsburgh Steelers from 2003 to 2004. In 2007, he accepted a position as the regional director of the Family Research Council. He announced his candidacy for the U.S. House of Representatives in September 2009.

== Playing career ==
=== Zeeland ===
Riemersma was born in Evansville, Indiana and grew up in Zeeland, Michigan. In 1991, he graduated from Zeeland High School, where he was a star athlete in three sports. He became Zeeland's all-time leading scorer in basketball, played baseball for two seasons, and was the quarterback for the football team.

=== Michigan ===
Riemersma enrolled at the University of Michigan in 1991. Originally recruited by Michigan as a quarterback, Riemersma appeared in three games at that position in the 1992 and 1993 seasons. On September 26, 1992, he made his debut as a redshirt freshman against the University of Houston. He came into the game as a substitute for Todd Collins in the third quarter and completed all three passes he attempted for 43 yards, including a 14-yard touchdown pass to Amani Toomer in the fourth quarter. He completed a total of six of eleven passes for 79 yards the 1992 and 1993 seasons.

In 1994, Riemersma suffered a rotator cuff injury, which ended his career as a quarterback. Michigan head coach Gary Moeller switched Riemersma to the tight end position, where he played in the 1994 and 1995 seasons. Interviewed in 2009, Riemersma pointed to the rotator cuff injury as "divine intervention," saying, "Some called the injury luck. I called it divine intervention. I never would have played in the NFL as a quarterback. It was an injury that parlayed into an NFL career."

During the 1994 season, Riemersma became one of quarterback Todd Collins' favorite targets, finishing as the team's third leading receiver behind Amani Toomer and Mercury Hayes. He caught 33 passes for 336 yards and two touchdowns in 1994. His most productive games were against Notre Dame (5 catches for 69 yards and a touchdown) and Wisconsin (8 catches for 79 yards and a touchdown).

In 1995, Riemersma added another 41 catches for 370 yards and a touchdown. His best games of the 1995 season came against Virginia and Michigan State. He connected with Scott Dreisbach for seven catches and 71 yards in the Wolverines' come-from-behind 18–17 win over Virginia in the season opener, and he caught a career-high nine passes, good for 70 yards, in a 28–25 loss to the Spartans. The longest reception of his college career was a 35-yard catch in Michigan's 31–23 win over Ohio State in 1995.

In two seasons as Michigan's tight end, Reimersma caught 74 passes for 706 yards. While completing his degree at Michigan, Riemersma twice earned Academic All-Big Ten Conference awards. He also won both the Meyer Morton Award and the Arthur Robinson Scholarship Award while attending Michigan.

=== NFL ===
==== Buffalo Bills ====
Riemersma was selected by the Buffalo Bills as the 35th pick of the seventh round (244th pick overall) of the 1996 NFL draft. He spent seven seasons in Buffalo from 1996 to 2002, appearing in 90 games, 65 as a starter. As a tight end for the Bills, he had 221 receptions for 2,304 yards and 20 touchdowns.

As a rookie in 1996, Riemersma did not see any action. In his second season he appeared in all 16 games for the Bills, including eight as a starter. He caught 26 passes for 208 yards and two touchdowns.

In 1998, Riemersma had a career-high six touchdowns in 16 games for the Bills. He had his first career two-touchdown game in a November 2000 win over the Miami Dolphins.

From 1999 to 2001, he missed only six games in four years, and accumulated 1,808 receiving yards and 12 touchdowns. In a September 2000 game against the Green Bay Packers, Riemersma had his second career two-touchdown game and 70 receiving yards. After the game, teammate Eric Moulds said, "A couple of times they tried to double me and left Jay wide open down the field. We'll take that matchup all day. If you're going to leave Jay Riemersma one-on-one with a linebacker, you're going to lose most of the time."

He had his best season in 2001. He started 15 games for the 2001 Bills and caught 53 passes for 590 yards.

Riemersma was plagued by injuries during his six years with the Bills. He underwent eight surgeries during his NFL career. His offensive production declined in 2002 to 32 receptions for 350 yards, and for the first time in his NFL career, Riemersma did not score a touchdown in 2002. In February 2003, the Bills announced that they intended to release Riemersma unless he accepted a significant pay cut. Bills president Tom Donahoe said the club was asking Riemersma to restructure the final year of his contract, reportedly worth $3.5 million. The Bills officially released Riemersma in late February 2003.

==== Pittsburgh Steelers ====
In March 2003, Riemersma signed a three-year contract with the Pittsburgh Steelers worth almost $4 million. In his first game for the Steelers, a 34–15 win over the Baltimore Ravens on September 7, 2003, Riemersma "beat Baltimore safety Ed Reed badly" for a 20-yard touchdown pass from Tommy Maddox. On the next drive, Ravens safety Gary Baxter followed Riemersma and left Hines Ward wide open for a 28-yard touchdown catch. After the game, Steelers coach Bill Cowher said, "Jay Riemersma adds a dimension we never had. He gives you a guy that you better start thinking about down the middle of the field." He played for Pittsburgh in 2003 and 2004 before rupturing his right Achilles tendon on a 26-yard touchdown reception against the Jacksonville Jaguars in December 2004. At the time of the injury, the Pittsburgh Post-Gazette reported, "Jay Riemersma caught a touchdown pass in his first game with the Steelers and his last, but that's about the extent of any good fortune the tight end has had in his two seasons here."

Riemersma did not play another game in the NFL after suffering the Achilles tendon injury. In February 2005, the Steelers released Riemersma in a salary cap move required after the Steelers' 15-1 performance in 2004 triggered performance bonuses, including a $2 million bonus to Ben Roethlisberger. Riemersma spent the 2005 season coaching high school football and recovering from his injury. In January 2006, Riemersma announced that he would not attempt a comeback and that he was retiring from the NFL. His agent, said at the time that the nature and severity of the injury would make it too difficult for Riemersma to play again.

In nine NFL seasons, Riemersma played in 112 games (85 as a starter) and caught 221 passes for 2,524 yards and 23 touchdowns.

== NFL career statistics ==
Legend
**Bold**	Career high

=== Regular season ===
Year	Team	Games		Receiving				
Year	Team	GP	GS	Rec	Yds	Avg	Lng	TD
1997	BUF	16	8	26	208	8.0	22	2
1998	BUF	16	3	25	288	11.5	28	**6**
1999	BUF	14	11	37	496	13.4	**38**	4
2000	BUF	12	12	31	372	12.0	35	5
2001	BUF	16	15	**53**	**590**	11.1	36	3
2002	BUF	16	15	32	350	10.9	29	0
2003	PIT	11	7	10	138	**13.8**	24	1
2004	PIT	11	2	7	82	11.7	26	2
Career		112	73	221	2,524	11.4	38	23

=== Playoffs ===
Year	Team	Games		Receiving				
Year	Team	GP	GS	Rec	Yds	Avg	Lng	TD
1998	BUF	1	0	**1**	**4**	**4.0**	**4**	0
1999	BUF	1	1	0	0	0.0	0	0
Career		2	1	1	4	4.0	4	0

== Football coach ==
In August 2005, while trying to rehabilitate his Achilles tendon, Riemersma returned to western Michigan and took on a one-year assignment as the football coach at Zeeland East High School. After announcing his retirement from the NFL in January 2006, Riemersma returned for two more seasons as the football coach at Zeeland East. In three years as the football coach from 2005 to 2007, Riemersma compiled a record of 1-26. In 2008, Riemersma said, "We won just one game while I was there. I'm really proud, though, of what we tried to accomplish in building character in the kids."

In 2009, Riemersma was inducted into the Grand Rapids Sports Hall of Fame.

== Politics ==
In November 2007, Riemersma joined Family Research Council, a nonprofit organization based in Washington, D.C., as the director of a six-state region that includes Michigan. In September 2009, Riemersma announced that he would run for the U.S. House of Representatives as a Republican in Michigan's 2nd congressional district. The seat was held by Rep. Peter Hoekstra who was vacating it to run for Governor of Michigan. Riemersma said he would fight against abortion, taxes and big government. He was ultimately defeated in the primary election by Bill Huizenga, who would go on to win the general election. In February 2010, Riemersma drew attention when he announced his support for Tim Tebow's Focus on the Family Super Bowl advertisement.

== Personal ==
Jay, his wife Cara, their three children, Sophie, Trip, and Nick, and their dog Penny reside in Holland, Michigan. Riemersma is an active member of Parkside Bible Church in Holland. Riemersma also serves on the board of directors of the American Red Cross, Ottawa County Chapter.
