= 1995 Michigan Wolverines football team =

American college football season

1995 Michigan Wolverines football

Alamo Bowl, L 20–22 vs. Texas A&M
- Conference: Big Ten Conference

Ranking
- Coaches: No. 19
- AP: No. 17
- Record: 9–4 (5–3 Big Ten)
- Head coach: Lloyd Carr (1st season)
- Offensive coordinator: Fred Jackson (1st season)
- Defensive coordinator: Greg Mattison (1st season)
- MVP: Tim Biakabutuka
- Captains: Jarrett Irons; Joe Marinaro
- Home stadium: Michigan Stadium

1995 Big Ten Conference football standings
	Conf.					Overall
Team	W		L		T	W		L		T
No. 8 Northwestern $	8	–	0	–	0	10	–	2	–	0
No. 6 Ohio State	7	–	1	–	0	11	–	2	–	0
No. 13 Penn State	5	–	3	–	0	9	–	3	–	0
No. 17 Michigan	5	–	3	–	0	9	–	4	–	0
Michigan State	4	–	3	–	1	6	–	5	–	1
No. 25 Iowa	4	–	4	–	0	8	–	4	–	0
Illinois	3	–	4	–	1	5	–	5	–	1
Wisconsin	3	–	4	–	1	4	–	5	–	2
Purdue	2	–	5	–	1	4	–	6	–	1
Minnesota	1	–	7	–	0	3	–	8	–	0
Indiana	0	–	8	–	0	2	–	9	–	0
$ – Conference champion; Rankings from AP Poll

The 1995 Michigan Wolverines football team was an American football team that represented the University of Michigan as a member of the Big Ten Conference during the 1995 NCAA Division I-A football season. In their first season under head coach Lloyd Carr, the Wolverines compiled a 9–4 record (5–3 in conference games), outscored opponents by a total of 318 to 201, tied for third place in the Big Ten, and were ranked No. 17 in the final AP Poll.

Running back Tim Biakabutuka set Michigan's single-season rushing record with 1,818 rushing yards, including 313 yards in an upset victory over No. 2 Ohio State. The team's other statistical leaders included quarterback Brian Griese with 1,395 passing yards, wide receiver Mercury Hayes with 46 receptions for 888 yards, and placekicker Remy Hamilton with 83 points scored (32 extra points, 17 field goals).

Defensive tackle Jason Horn was selected as a first-team All-American by the American Football Coaches Association. Five Michigan players received first-team honors on the 1995 All-Big Ten Conference football team: center Rod Payne (Coaches); offensive tackle Jon Runyan (Coaches; Media); Horn (Coaches; Media); linebacker Jarrett Irons (Coaches; Media); and defensive backs Clarence Thompson (Coaches; Media) and Charles Woodson (Coaches).

The Wolverines played their home games at Michigan Stadium.

== Schedule ==
Date	Time	Opponent	Rank	Site	TV	Result	Attendance	Source
August 26	12:00 p.m.	No. 17 Virginia*	No. 14	Michigan Stadium; Ann Arbor, MI (Pigskin Classic)	ABC	W 18–17	101,444	
September 2	3:30 p.m.	at No. 25 Illinois	No. 13	Memorial Stadium; Champaign, IL (rivalry)	ABC	W 38–14	70,193	
September 9	12:30 p.m.	Memphis*	No. 11	Michigan Stadium; Ann Arbor, MI	PASS	W 24–7	100,862	
September 16	6:30 p.m.	at Boston College*	No. 11	Alumni Stadium; Chestnut Hill, MA	ESPN	W 23–13	44,500	
September 30	12:30 p.m.	Miami (OH)*	No. 8	Michigan Stadium; Ann Arbor, MI	PASS	W 38–19	104,484	
October 7	12:30 p.m.	No. 25 Northwestern	No. 7	Michigan Stadium; Ann Arbor, MI (rivalry)	ESPN	L 13–19	104,642	
October 21	12:00 p.m.	at Indiana	No. 10	Memorial Stadium; Bloomington, IN	ESPN Plus	W 34–17	44,623	
October 28	3:30 p.m.	Minnesota^{†}	No. 9	Michigan Stadium; Ann Arbor, MI (Little Brown Jug)	ABC	W 52–17	104,929	
November 4	3:30 p.m.	at Michigan State	No. 7	Spartan Stadium; East Lansing, MI (rivalry)	ABC	L 25–28	74,667	
November 11	12:00 p.m.	Purdue	No. 13	Michigan Stadium; Ann Arbor, MI	ESPN	W 5–0	103,721	
November 18	12:00 p.m.	at No. 19 Penn State	No. 12	Beaver Stadium; University Park, PA (rivalry)	ABC	L 17–27	96,677	
November 25	12:00 p.m.	No. 2 Ohio State	No. 18	Michigan Stadium; Ann Arbor, MI (The Game)	ABC	W 31–23	106,288	
December 28	7:00 p.m.	vs. No. 19 Texas A&M*	No. 14	Alamodome; San Antonio, TX (Alamo Bowl)	ESPN	L 20–22	64,597	
*Non-conference game; ^{†}Homecoming; Rankings from AP Poll released prior to the game; All times are in Eastern time

== Game summaries ==
=== Virginia ===
Virginia Cavaliers at Michigan Wolverines

Quarter	1	2	3	4	Total
Virginia	0	7	7	3	17
Michigan	0	0	0	18	18

at Michigan Stadium

- Date: August 26, 1995
- Game time: 12:00 p.m. EST
- Game weather: Sunny and hot, mid 80s F, wind 12–15 mph (19–24 km/h) WNW
- Game attendance: 101,444
- TV: ABC

Game information
First quarter
- No scoring

Second quarter

- UVA - Groh 1-yard run (Garcia kick)

Third quarter

- UVA - T. Barber 81-yard run (Garcia kick)

Fourth quarter

- UVA - Garcia 30-yard field goal
- MICH - Davis 2-yard run (kick failed)
- MICH - Hayes 31-yard pass from Dreisbach (pass failed)
- MICH - Hayes 15-yard pass from Dreisbach (no attempt)

On August 26, Michigan defeated Virginia, 18–17, in the Pigskin Classic before a crowd of 101,444 spectators at Michigan Stadium. It was Lloyd Carr's first game as Michigan's head coach.

On the opening drive of the game, redshirt freshman quarterback Scott Dreisbach led Michigan to Virginia's 26-yard line, but Remy Hamilton's attempt at a 43-yard field goal was unsuccessful. Neither team scored in the first quarter. Virginia missed a 39-yard field goal early in the second quarter. The Cavaliers also missed a 28-yard field goal later in the second quarter. The game remained scoreless until the final minute of the first half. Ronde Barber intercepted a Dreisbach pass and returned it 18 yards to Michigan's 29-yard line. Virginia scored four plays later with a one-yard option run by quarterback Mike Groh. Virginia led, 7-0, at halftime.

On the opening drive of the second half, Virginia faced a third-and-eleven when Tiki Barber broke the game open with an 81-yard touchdown run down the left sideline. It was the second-longest scoring run from scrimmage against Michigan in modern history (trailing only a 98-yard run by Darrell Thompson of Minnesota in 1987). Late in the third quarter, Michigan drove to Virginia's six-yard line, but Dreisbach was intercepted in the end zone by Percy Ellsworth.

After the interception, Virginia drove 67 yards to Michigan's 13-yard line. With 12:55 remaining in the game, Virginia kicked a 30-yard field goal to extend its lead to 17-0. After the kickoff, Michigan drove 76 yards on five plays, including passes of 41 and 43 yards from Dreisbach to Mercury Hayes. Ed Davis then scored on a two-yard touchdown run with 11:36 remaining in the game. Remy Hamilton's kick for extra point failed. After holding Virginia to a three-and-out, Michigan drove 75 yards on six plays, scoring on a 31-yard touchdown pass from Dreisbach to Hayes with 7:47 remaining. Dreisbach's pass to Jay Riemersma for a two-point conversion was incomplete, and Michigan trailed, 17-12. Virginia then drove to Michigan's 28-yard line, running more than five minutes off the clock. Virginia tried to pin the Wolverines with a short punt, but the ball bounced into the end zone for a touchback. Taking over with 2:35 remaining, Dreisbach led the Wolverines on an 80-yard drive. From the 15-yard line, Dreisbah threw three incomplete passes. On fourth down, four seconds remained on the clock. As time expired, Dreisbach connected with Hayes in the far right edge of the end zone, Hayes barely touching his left foot inbounds for the game-winning touchdown. It was Michigan's biggest comeback victory ever up to that date.

Dreisbach completed 27 of 52 passes for 372 yards, two touchdowns, and two interceptions. He went 12 of 23 for 236 yards in the fourth quarter and set Michigan single-game records for both pass attempts (52) and passing yards (372). Hayes had seven receptions for 179 yards and two touchdowns. Michigan's rushing offense struggled, tallying only 52 yards on 27 carries. Tiki Barber led the Cavaliers with 113 rushing yards on 12 carries, an average of 9.4 yards per carry.

=== At Illinois ===
On September 2, Michigan defeated No. 25 Illinois, 38–14, before a crowd of 70,193 at Memorial Stadium in Champaign, Illinois.

Late in the first quarter, Michigan recovered a fumbled punt return at the Illinois 11-yard line. Scott Dreisbach then threw a touchdown pass to a wide-open Chris Howard in the end zone with 4:33 remaining in the quarter. In the second quarter, Clint Copenhaver intercepted a Johnny Johnson pass. Michigan converted on the turnover with a 49-yard field goal by Remy Hamilton. Michigan led, 10-0, at halftime.

The Wolverines scored 21 points in the third quarter, starting with a 46-yard pass from Dreisbach to Mercury Hayes. After Charles Woodson recovered an Illinois fumble, Tim Biakabutuka scored on an eleven-yard run 30 seconds after Hayes' touchdown. Three-and-a-half minutes later, Illinois fumbled again, Rasheed Simmons recovering for Michigan near midfield. Biakabutu then scored on a 35-yard run.

Early in the fourth quarter, Anthony Williams blocked an Illinois punt and recovered the ball in the end zone for a touchdown. Michigan led, 38-0, with 13 minutes remaining in the game. Illinois scored two touchdowns in final seven minutes.

Tim Biakabutuka gained 97 rushing yards on 10 carries (9.7 yards per carry) and scored three touchdowns. After setting a Michigan record with 52 pass attempts the prior week, Dreisbach threw only 12 times, completing seven passes for 139 yards and one touchdown. Hayes caught three passes for 66 yards. On defense, Michigan held the Illini to 66 rushing yards, but gave up 285 passing yards.

Michigan Wolverines at Illinois Fighting Illini

Quarter	1	2	3	4	Total
Michigan	7	3	21	7	38
Illinois	0	0	0	14	14

at Memorial Stadium, Champaign, Illinois

- Date: September 2, 1995
- Game time: 2:30 p.m. CST
- Game attendance: 70,193
- Box Score

Game information
First quarter
- MICH - C Howard 13 pass from Dreisbach (Hamilton kick)

Second quarter

- MICH - FG Hamilton 49

Third quarter

- MICH - Biakabutuka 5 run (Hamilton kick)
- MICH - Biakabutuka 11 run (Hamilton kick)
- MICH - Biakabutuka 35 run (Hamilton kick)

Fourth quarter

- MICH - A Williams 28 blocked punt return (Hamilton kick)
- ILL - Smith 5 run (B Scheuplein kick)
- ILL - L Willis 5 pass from Weaver (B Scheuplein kick)

=== Memphis ===
Tim Biakabutuka had another big day as he rushed for 143 yards and two touchdowns as the No. 11 Wolverines struggled to a 24–7 victory over the Tigers. Ed Davis added a touchdown run and Scott Dreisbach was efficient completing 13 of 21 passes for 162 yards. The Michigan defense held Memphis to 96 yards of total offense. Charles Woodson and Rob Sweet had interceptions for the Wolverines.

Memphis Tigers at Michigan Wolverines

Quarter	1	2	3	4	Total
Memphis	0	0	0	7	7
Michigan	7	7	7	3	24

at Michigan Stadium, Ann Arbor, Michigan

- Date: September 9, 1995
- Game time: 12:30 p.m. EST
- Game weather: Sunny and Mild, 70 °F (21 °C), wind 15–20 mph (24–32 km/h) NNW
- Game attendance: 100,862
- TV: PASS

Game information
First quarter
- MICH - Biakabutuka 3-yard run (Hamilton kick)

Second quarter

- MICH - Biakabutuka 10-yard run (Hamilton kick)

Third quarter

- MICH - Davis 3-yard run (Hamilton kick)

Fourth quarter

- MEM - J. Woods 28-yard fumble return (Pairamore kick)
- MICH - Hamilton 29-yard field goal

=== At Boston College ===
The Wolverine defense held Boston College to 188 yards of total offense and intercepted 4 passes as they grabbed an early lead and held on for a 23–13 victory over the Eagles. Chuck Winters, Scott King, Rob Sweet and Clarence Thompson each had one interception. Remy Hamilton kicked three field goals while Tim Biakabutuka and Ed Davis scored touchdowns for Michigan.

Michigan Wolverines at Boston College Eagles

Quarter	1	2	3	4	Total
Michigan	10	14	7	3	34
Boston College	3	0	7	7	17

at Alumni Stadium, Chestnut Hill, Massachusetts

- Date: October 21, 1995
- Game time: 6:30 p.m. EST
- Game weather: Warm, 64 °F (18 °C), wind 22 mph (35 km/h) SE
- Game attendance: 44,500
- Referee: Buddy Ward
- TV: ESPN

Game information

First quarter

- No scoring

Second quarter

- BC - Walker 4-yard run (pass failed)
- MICH - Hamilton 25-yard field goal
- MICH - Biakabutuka 18-yard run (Hamilton kick)
- MICH - Hamilton 39-yard field goal

Third quarter

- MICH - Hamilton 29-yard field goal
- MICH - Davis 1-yard run (Hamilton kick)

Fourth quarter

- BC - Pollack 5-yard pass from Hasselback (McGuire kick)

Top Rushers

- MICH - Biakabutuka - 32 rushes, 117 yards, 1 TD
- BC - Smith - 24 rushes, 76 yards

Top Passers

- MICH - Dreisbach - 9/21, 177 yards, 1 INT
- BC - Hartsell - 8/20, 74 yards, 3 INTs

Top Receivers

- MICH - Toomer - 4 receptions, 76 yards
- BC - Grice - 3 receptions, 47 yards

=== Miami (OH) ===
Michigan raced to a 31–0 halftime lead and despite giving up 19 third quarter points, they held on for a 38–19 victory over the Redhawks. Remy Hamilton kicked three field goals, Tim Biakabutuka ran for a touchdown and Brian Griese threw two touchdowns. Griese completed 14 of 24 passes for 192 yards. Mercury Hayes and Amani Toomer were on the receiving end of Griese's TD passes.

Miami (OH) Redskins at Michigan Wolverines

Quarter	1	2	3	4	Total
Miami (OH)	0	0	19	0	19
Michigan	21	10	0	7	38

at Michigan Stadium, Ann Arbor, Michigan

- Date: September 30, 1995
- Game time: 12:30 p.m. EST
- Game attendance: 104,044
- TV: ESPN

Game information
First quarter
- MICH - Hamilton 43-yard field goal
- MICH - Hamilton 39-yard field goal
- MICH - Winters 36-yard interception return (Hayes pass from Griese)
- MICH - Toomer 22-yard pass from Griese (Hamilton kick)

Second quarter

- MICH - Hamilton 37-yard field goal
- MICH - Hayes 31-yard pass from Griese (Hamilton kick)

Third quarter

- MIA - Seitz 27-yard field goal
- MIA - Seitz 54-yard field goal
- MIA - McCullough 1-yard run (Seitz kick)
- MIA - McCullough 9-yard run (attempt failed)

Fourth quarter

- MICH - Biakabutuka 3-yard run (Hamilton kick)

=== Northwestern ===
Despite Tim Biakabutuka rushing for 205 yards, #7 Michigan fell to No. 25 Northwestern 19–13 at Michigan Stadium. Darnell Autry rushed for 100 yards for the Wildcats and a Steve Schnurr 2-yard pass to Matt Hartl tied the game at 13–13. Sam Velanzisi kicked two field goals to give Northwestern the win and spur them on to winning the Big Ten title. Remy Hamilton kicked two field goals and Brian Griese ran for a touchdown to account for Michigan's points.

#25 Northwestern Wildcats at #7 Michigan Wolverines

Quarter	1	2	3	4	Total
Northwestern	0	6	3	10	19
Michigan	3	3	7	0	13

at Michigan Stadium, Ann Arbor, Michigan

- Date: October 7, 1995
- Game time: 12:30 p.m. EST
- Game attendance: 104,642
- TV: ESPN
- Box Score

Game information
First quarter
- UM - Remy Hamilton 41-yard field goal

Second quarter

- UM - Remy Hamilton 21-yard field goal
- NU - Sam Valenzisi 29-yard field goal
- NU - Sam Valenzisi 28-yard field goal

Third quarter

- UM - Brian Griese 3-yard run (Hamilton kick)
- NU - Sam Valenzisi 32-yard field goal

Fourth quarter

- NU - Matt Hartl 2-yard pass from Steve Schnur (Valenzisi kick)
- NU - Sam Valenzisi 22-yard field goal

=== At Indiana ===
Michigan raced to a 24–3 halftime lead on the way to a 34–17 victory over the Hoosiers in Bloomington, Indiana. Tim Biakabutuka rushed for 111 yards and Brian Griese completed 14 of 21 passes for 127 yards. Griese threw two touchdown passes, one each to Amani Toomer and Jerame Tuman. The Wolverine defense held the Hoosiers to 40 yards rushing and had interceptions by Chuck Winters and Clarence Thompson. Remy Hamilton added two field goals.

Michigan Wolverines at Indiana Hoosiers

Quarter	1	2	3	4	Total
Michigan	10	14	7	3	34
Indiana	3	0	7	7	17

at Memorial Stadium, Bloomington, Indiana

- Date: October 21, 1995
- Game time: 12:00 p.m. EST
- Game attendance: 44,623
- TV: ESPN
- Box score and Game recap

Game information

First quarter

- IND - FG Manolopoulos 37
- MICH - FG Hamilton 22
- MICH - Toomer 56 punt return (Hamilton kick)

Second quarter

- MICH - Davis 2 run (Hamilton kick)
- MICH - Tuman 3 pass from Griese (Hamilton kick)

Third quarter

- MICH - Toomer 3 pass from Griese (Hamilton kick)
- IND - Greenlee 9 run (Horn kick)

Fourth quarter

- MICH - FG Hamilton 25
- IND - Goode 2 pass from Greenlee (Horn kick)

Top Rushers

- MICH - Biakabutuka - 16 rushes, 111 yards
- IND - Greenlee - 7 rushes, 22 yards

Top Passers

- MICH - Griese - 14/21, 127 yards, 2 TDs
- IND - Greenlee - 23/40, 229 yards, 1 TD, 2 INTs

Top Receivers

- MICH - C. Howard 5 receptions, 28 yards
- MICH - Amani Toomer - 3 receptions, 53 yards, 1 TD
- IND - Glover - 9 receptions, 62 yards

=== Minnesota ===
Tim Biakabutuka ran for 196 yards and two touchdowns as the No. 9 ranked Wolverines routed the Golden Gophers 52–17 at the "Big House". Brian Griese completed 14 of 19 passes for 271 yards and 4 touchdown passes. Amani Toomer caught 5 passes for 177 yards and two TD receptions. Michigan finished with 623 yards of total offense.

Minnesota Golden Gophers at Michigan Wolverines

Quarter	1	2	3	4	Total
Minnesota	0	10	0	7	17
Michigan	21	0	17	14	52

at Michigan Stadium, Ann Arbor, Michigan

- Date: October 28, 1995
- Game time: 2:30 p.m. CST
- Game attendance: 104,929
- Box Score

Game information

First quarter

- MICH - 8:04-Biakabutuka 52 run (Hamilton kick)
- MICH - 7:30-Biakabutuka 16 run (Hamilton kick)
- MICH - 4:47-Toomer 75 pass from Griese (Hamilton kick)

Second quarter

- MIN - 2:38-Chalberg 30 FG
- MIN - 0:47-Cooper 2 run (Chalberg kick)

Third quarter

- MICH - 13:27-Toomer 52 pass from Griese (Hamilton kick)
- MICH - 9:41-Hamilton 26 FG
- MICH - 1:55-Howard 5 pass from Griese (Hamilton kick)

Fourth quarter

- MICH - 11:59-Riemersma 6 pass from Griese (Hamilton kick)
- MICH - 5:16-Williams 11 run (Hamilton kick)
- MIN - 1:19-Nelson 13 pass from Sauter (Chalberg kick)

Rushing

- MIN - Rafael Cooper - 14/68, 1 TD
- MICH - Tshimanga Biakabutuka - 19/196, 2 TDs

Passing

- MIN - Cory Sauter - 39/20/2, 206 yards, 1 TD
- MICH - Brian Griese - 19/14/0, 271 yards, 4 TDs

Receiving

- MIN - Ryan Thelwell - 6/85
- MIN - Johnny Woodson - 5/36
- MICH - Amani Toomer - 5/177, 2 TDs
- MICH - Mercury Hayes - 2/50

=== At Michigan State ===
The Spartans led 14–3 at halftime thanks to a 70-yard Derrick Mason punt return TD. The Wolverines rallied behind Brian Griese and led 25–21 with 3:38 left. Tony Banks guided the Spartans 88 yards over the next 2:24, with a fourth and 11 pass to Mason keeping the drive alive and a juggling catch later in the drive. Banks found Nigea Carter for a 25-yard TD with 1:14 left, finishing 26 for 34 with 318 yards in the 28–25 win for Michigan State. Tim Biakabutuka rushed for 191 yards and a touchdown for the Wolverines.

Michigan Wolverines at Michigan State Spartans

Quarter	1	2	3	4	Total
Michigan	3	0	8	14	25
Michigan State	0	14	0	14	28

at Spartan Stadium, East Lansing, Michigan

- Date: November 4, 1995
- Game time: 3:30 p.m. EST
- Game attendance: 74,667
- Box Score

Game information
First quarter
- UM - Hamilton 35-yard field goal

Second quarter

- MSU - Mason 70-yard punt return (Gardner kick)
- MSU - Greene 7-yard run (Gardner kick)

Third quarter

- UM - W. Carr 3-yard run (Campbell pass from Griese)

Fourth quarter

- UM - Biakabutuka 5-yard run (Hamilton kick)
- MSU - Greene 1-yard run (Gardner kick)
- UM - Hayes 22-yard pass from Griese (Hamilton kick)
- MSU - Carter 25-yard pass from Banks (Gardner kick)

=== Purdue ===
A muddy field, freezing temperatures and wind gusting to 50 mph (80 km/h) made Michigan's offense ineffective Saturday. The #13 Wolverines rode Remy Hamilton's field goal and Clarence Thompson's safety to a 5–0 victory over Purdue. It was the lowest-scoring game at Michigan Stadium since the Wolverines defeated Northwestern 7–0 in 1972. Michigan held Purdue to just four first downs, one in the first half. Both teams floundered while Michigan controlled the ball 37 minutes, 22 seconds, but the Wolverines gained only 283 yards on 79 plays.

Purdue Boilermakers at Michigan Wolverines

Quarter	1	2	3	4	Total
Purdue	0	0	0	0	0
Michigan	3	0	0	2	5

at Michigan Stadium, Ann Arbor, Michigan

- Date: November 11, 1995
- Game time: 12:00 p.m. EST
- Game attendance: 103,721
- Box Score

Game information

First quarter

- MICH - Remy Hamilton 25-yard field goal

Second quarter

Third quarter

Fourth quarter

- MICH - Safety, Rick Trefzger tackled by Clarence Thompson

Top Rushers

- PUR - Watson - 9 rushes, 31 yards
- MICH - Tim Biakabutuka - 14 rushes, 84 yards

Top Passers

- PUR - Rick Trefzger - 11/19, 84 yards, 1 INT
- MICH - Brian Griese - 11/24, 101 yards, 1 INT

Top Receivers

- PUR - Olivadotti 4 receptions, 27 yards
- PUR - Alford 2 receptions, 240 yards
- MICH - Mercury Hayes - 4 receptions, 42 yards
- MICH - Amani Toomer - 3 receptions, 25 yards

=== At Penn State ===
The Nittany Lions jumped out to a 10–0 lead in the second quarter following a 49-yard field goal from Brett Conway and a 13-yard touchdown pass from Wally Richardson to Mike Archie. Michigan answered on a Brian Griese touchdown pass to Amani Toomer, but Conway added a 51-yard field goal to make it a 13–7 game at halftime. Remy Hamilton kicked a field goal to set the score at 13-10 heading into the fourth quarter. Richardson and Bobby Engram connected on a 12-yard scoring play in the fourth quarter to make it a 20–10 game. Michigan pulled to within three on an 18-yard touchdown run from Tim Biakabutuka. Then the Nittany Lions used a fake field goal attempt to seal a 27–17 victory over the Wolverines. With 2:40 to play and the Lions leading 20–17, kicker Brett Conway lined up for a 19-yard field goal attempt. The snap went to holder Joe Nastasi, who breezed into the end zone for a 2-yard touchdown to help clinch the win over the 12th ranked Wolverines.

Michigan Wolverines at Penn State Nittany Lions

Quarter	1	2	3	4	Total
Michigan	0	7	3	7	17
Penn State	0	13	0	14	27

at Beaver Stadium, State College, Pennsylvania

- Date: November 18, 1995
- Game time: 12:00 p.m. EST
- Game attendance: 96,677
- Box Score

Game information

Second quarter

- PSU - Conway 49-yard field goal
- PSU - Archie 13-yard pass from Richardson (Conway kick)
- UM - Toomer 18-yard pass from Griese (Hamilton kick)
- PSU - Conway 51-yard field goal

Third quarter

- UM - Hamilton kick 29-yard field goal

Fourth quarter

- PSU - Engram 12-yard pass from Richardson (Conway kick)
- UM - Biakabutuka 18-yard run (Hamilton kick)
- PSU - Nastasi 2-yard run on fake field goal (Conway kick)

Top Passers

- UM - Brian Griese - 24/46, 232 yards, 1 TD, 2 INTs
- PSU - Wally Richardson - 17/31, 193 yards, 2 TDs

Top Rushers

- UM - Tim Biakabutuka - 26 rushes, 139 yards, 1 TD
- PSU - Pitts - 17 rushes, 164 yards

Top Receivers

- UM - Amani Toomer - 8 receptions, 128 yards, 1 TD
- PSU - Bobby Engram - 5 receptions, 87 yards, 1 TD

=== Ohio State ===
Tim Biakabutuka rushed for 313 yards and a touchdown, and led #18 Michigan to a 31–23 upset over the No. 2 Buckeyes in front of 106,288 at Michigan Stadium. Michigan ran up 381 yards rushing while holding the Buckeyes to just 106. Overall, Michigan had 484 yards total offense to Ohio State's 392. Brian Griese hit Clarence Williams for a 2-yard touchdown for a 7–3 lead. The teams traded field goals, a 38-yarder by Michigan's Remy Hamilton, and a 37-yarder by Josh Jackson with six seconds left in the half, and the Wolverines were up 10–9 at halftime. Trailing 17–9, Ohio State got a one-yard touchdown dive by George, but did not convert on the two-point play. Williams scored from 8 yards to increase the Michigan lead to 24–15. A two-yard touchdown run by Biakabutuka with 7:55 left in the game would give the Wolverines all the cushion they would need at 31–15. Ohio State got to within eight points on a 19-yard touchdown pass from Bobby Hoying to Buster Tillman, and a two-point conversion, with 6:33 left in the game, but that was as close as the Buckeyes would get.

Ohio State Buckeyes at Michigan Wolverines

Quarter	1	2	3	4	Total
Ohio State	3	6	6	8	23
Michigan	7	3	7	14	31

at Michigan Stadium, Ann Arbor, Michigan

- Date: November 25, 1995
- Game time: 12:00 p.m. EST
- Game weather: Mostly Sunny, Cool, 45 °F (7 °C), Wind 15–20 mph (24–32 km/h)
- Game attendance: 106,228

Game information

First quarter

- OSU - Josh Jackson 37-yard field goal 7:29
- UM - Clarence Williams 4-yard pass from Brian Griese (Remy Hamilton kick) 5:34

Second quarter

- OSU - Josh Jackson 21-yard field goal 10:38
- UM - Remy Hamilton 37-yard field goal 5:32
- OSU - Josh Jackson 37-yard field goal 0:02

Third quarter

- UM - Brian Griese 2-yard run (Remy Hamilton kick) 10:52
- OSU - Eddie George 1-yard run (run failed) 1:14

Fourth quarter

- UM - Clarence Williams 8-yard run (Remy Hamilton kick) 13:04
- UM - Tim Biakabutuka 2-yard run (Remy Hamilton kick) 7:55
- OSU - Buster Tillman 19-yard pass from Bobby Hoying (Eddie George pass from Bobby Hoying) 6:33

Top Passers

- OSU - Bobby Hoying - 22/45, 286 yards, 1 TD, 2 INTs
- UM - Brian Griese - 9/18, 103 yards, 1 TD, 3 INTs

Top Rushers

- UM - Tim Biakabutuka - 37 rushes, 313 yards, 1 TD
- OSU - Eddie George - 21 rushes, 104 yards, 1 TD

Top Receivers

- OSU - Terry Glenn - 4 receptions, 72 yards
- OSU - Rickey Dudley - 5 receptions, 59 yards

Top Tacklers

- UM - Jarrett Irons - 11 (9 solo, 2 assisted)
- OSU - Ryan Miller - 11 (7 solo, 4 assisted)
- OSU - Kevin Johnson - 11 (7 solo, 4 assisted)

Interceptions

- OSU - 3 - Shawn Springs (1), Rob Kelly (1), Mike Vrabel (1)
- UM -2 - Charles Woodson (2)

=== Alamo Bowl ===
Texas A&M scored first on a nine-yard run by running back Eric Bernard to take a 7–0 lead. Michigan answered with a 41-yard touchdown pass from quarterback Brian Griese to wide receiver Amani Toomer, tying the game. Texas A&M scored again following a 27-yard field goal by kicker Kyle Bryant, and Texas A&M reclaimed the lead at 10–7. In the second quarter, Remy Hamilton kicked a 28-yard field goal for Michigan to tie the game at ten. Bryant kicked his second field goal of the game, a 49 yarder before half to give Texas A&M a 13–10 halftime lead. In the third quarter, Bryant added another 47-yard field goal to increase the lead to 16–10. Michigan's 26-yard field goal from Hamilton closed the margin to three, but Bryant added field goals of 31 and 37 yards to put the game out of reach, giving Texas A&M a 22–13 lead with 22 seconds left in the game. Griese's 44-yard touchdown pass to Toomer pulled Michigan to within 22–20 with only five seconds left. This was the final bowl win for the Southwest Conference, which disbanded the following spring. In the final AP poll, Texas A&M climbed to fifteenth and Michigan fell to seventeenth.

Michigan Wolverines vs. Texas A&M Aggies

Quarter	1	2	3	4	Total
Michigan	7	3	3	7	20
Texas A&M	10	3	3	6	22

at Alamodome, San Antonio, Texas

- Date: December 28, 1995
- Game time: 12:00 p.m. EST
- Game weather: None (indoors)
- Game attendance: 64,597
- TV: ESPN
- Box score and Game recap

Game information

First quarter

- A&M - Bernard, nine-yard run (Bryant kick)
- MICH - Toomer, 41-yard pass from Griese (Hamilton kick)
- A&M - Bryant 27-yard Field Goal

Second quarter

- MICH - Hamilton, 28-yard Field Goal
- A&M - Bryant, 49-yard Field Goal

Third quarter

- A&M - Bryant, 47-yard Field Goal
- MICH - Hamilton, 26-yard Field Goal

Fourth quarter

- A&M - Bryant, 31-yard Field Goal
- A&M - Bryant, 37-yard Field Goal
- MICH - Toomer, 44-yard pass from Griese (Hamilton kick)

Top Rushers

- MICH - Biakabutuka - 24 rushes, 94 yards
- A&M - Parker - 21 rushes, 56 yards

Top Passers

- MICH - Griese - 9/23, 182 yards, 2 TDs
- A&M - Pullig - 12/22, 136 yards

Top Receivers

- MICH - Amani Toomer - 5 receptions, 135 yards, 2 TDs
- A&M - Heideman - 3 receptions, 41 yards

== Personnel ==
=== Players ===
1995 Michigan Wolverines football team roster
Players
Coaches
Offense .

Pos.	#	Name	Class
G	68	Zach Adami	Jr
RB	21	Tim Biakabutuka	Jr
QB	10	Tom Brady	Fr
WR	1	Tyrone Butterfield	So
TE	88	Mark Campbell	So
QB	13	Jason Carr	Sr
TB	26	Ed Davis	Sr
G	51	Damon Denson	Jr
QB	12	Scott Dreisbach	So
QB	14	Brian Griese	Jr
WR	9	Mercury Hayes	Sr
RB	8	Chris Howard	So
OT	77	Jon Jansen	So
C	52	Rod Payne	So
TE	16	Jay Riemersma	Sr
OT	69	Jon Runyan	Jr
TE	16	Jay Riemersma	Sr
WR	18	Amani Toomer	Sr
TE	84	Rob VanderLeest	Sr

Defense

Pos.	#	Name	Class
LB	50	David Choi	Jr
LB	5	Mike Elston	Jr
LB	37	Jarrett Irons	Sr
DT	91	Josh Williams	Fr
CB	2	Charles Woodson	Fr

Special teams

Pos.	#	Name	Class
PK	49	Jay Feely	So
K	19	Remy Hamilton	So

Head coach

- Lloyd Carr

Coordinators/assistant coaches

Legend

- (C) Team captain
- (S) Suspended
- (I) Ineligible
- Injured
- Redshirt

Roster

=== Coaching staff ===
- Head coach: Lloyd Carr
- Assistant coaches: Vance Bedford, Erik Campbell, Kit Cartwright, Mike DeBord, Jim Herrmann, Brady Hoke, Fred Jackson, Greg Mattison, Bobby Morrison
- Trainer: Paul Schmidt
- Managers: Jason Armstrong, Joe Allore, Adam Clous, Patrick Bolger, Jared Drinkwater, Michael Levine, Joel Gerring, Ed Magnus, Sami Samaha, Tibor Tuske

== Statistical achievements ==
The team earned the fifth of six 1990s Big Ten rushing defense statistical championships for all games by holding opponents to 93.2 yards per game. The team also earned the fifth of five consecutive and six 1990s Big Ten rushing defense statistical championships for conference games by holding opponents to 88.1 yards per game. The team led the conference in total defense for conference games (314.5) and all games (284.8). The loss against Northwestern ended a streak of 19 consecutive wins in the series.

Tim Biakabutuka set the following records: single-season rushing attempts (303), eclipsing Jamie Morris' eight-year-old record and broken five years later by Anthony Thomas; and single-season rushing yards (1818), also eclipsing an eight-year-old record by Morris, but currently still standing. His November 25 single-game 313-yard performance in the Michigan–Ohio State football rivalry game remains second to Ron Johnson's 347-yard 1967 performance.

Mercury Hayes had a 7-reception 179-yard performance culminating in a game-winning, fourth down, time expired 15-yard touchdown catch on August 26, 1995, from Scott Dreisbach to seal an 18–17 win against Virginia in Michigan's greatest comeback, a record that stood for eight years until 2003, when the Wolverines pulled off a 21-point comeback against Minnesota. Dreisbach's 52-pass attempts surpassed the school record by Dick Vidmer of 47 set in 1967. The 372 yards gained broke Todd Collins' 1994 record of 352. Tom Brady would surpass both records in 1998. Later in the season against Michigan State, Dreisbach became 9th Michigan passer to accumulate 4 touchdown passes in a game, a record which has been matched but not broken. The reception was recorded against University of Virginia Cavaliers defensive backs Ronde Barber and Paul London in the Pigskin Classic to complete what was at the time the largest comeback in Michigan Football history (17 points) in Lloyd Carr's coaching debut. The game constituted one of the two wildest finishes in Michigan Football history according to ESPN.

== Awards and honors ==
- Co-captains: Jarrett Irons, Joe Marinaro
- All-Americans: Jason Horn, Jon Runyan
- All-Conference: Jason Horn, Jarrett Irons, Jon Runyan, Clarence Thompson, Charles Woodson, Rod Payne
- Most Valuable Player: Tshimanga Biakabutuka
- Meyer Morton Award: Jarrett Irons
- Meyer Morton Award: Jay Riemersma
- John Maulbetsch Award: Jon Jansen
- Frederick Matthei Award: Jarrett Irons
- Arthur Robinson Scholarship Award: Jay Riemersma
- Dick Katcher Award: Jason Horn
- Hugh Rader Jr. Award: Joe Marinaro
- Robert P. Ufer Award: Jason Carr
- Roger Zatkoff Award: Jarrett Irons
