= Going Deep (disambiguation) =

"Going Deep" is a song by British electronic act Chicane.

Going Deep may also refer to:

- Going Deep with Amani and Dan, a program on NBC Sports Radio
- Going Deep with David Rees, a television program

== See also ==
- "Go Deep", a song by Janet Jackson
