= Mercury Hayes =

American Football Player (born 1973)

No. 89, 84, 80, 9
- Positions: Wide receiver, kickoff returner, punt returner

Personal information
- Born: January 1, 1973 (age 53); Houston, Texas, U.S.
- Listed height: 5 ft 11 in (1.80 m)
- Listed weight: 195 lb (88 kg)

Career information
- High school: Booker T. Washington (Houston, Texas)
- College: Michigan
- NFL draft: 1996: 5th round, 136th overall pick

Career history
- New Orleans Saints (1996–1997); Atlanta Falcons (1997); Washington Redskins (1998)*; Barcelona Dragons (1999)*; Montreal Alouettes (1999–2000); Norfolk Nighthawks (2002)*
- * Offseason or practice squad member only

Awards and highlights
- Second-team All-Big Ten (1995)

Career NFL statistics
- Receptions: 4
- Receiving yards: 101
- Stats at Pro Football Reference

Mercury Wayne Hayes (born January 1, 1973) is an American former professional football player who was a wide receiver, kickoff returner, and punt returner in the National Football League (NFL) for the New Orleans Saints and Atlanta Falcons, and in the Canadian Football League (CFL) for the Montreal Alouettes. Prior to his professional football experience he was a University of Michigan Wolverines football star. He was selected with the 136th overall pick in the 5th round of the 1996 National Football League draft.

Although he had a modest professional career, he was involved in many of the University of Michigan's most memorable football moments. He is notable for his game-winning catch in the 1995 Pigskin Classic against the University of Virginia. Hayes also once held the Michigan record for consecutive games with a reception (30). Hayes was a member of the 1992 Big Ten Champions who won the 1993 Rose Bowl. He had attended Booker T. Washington High School in Houston, Texas.

== College career ==
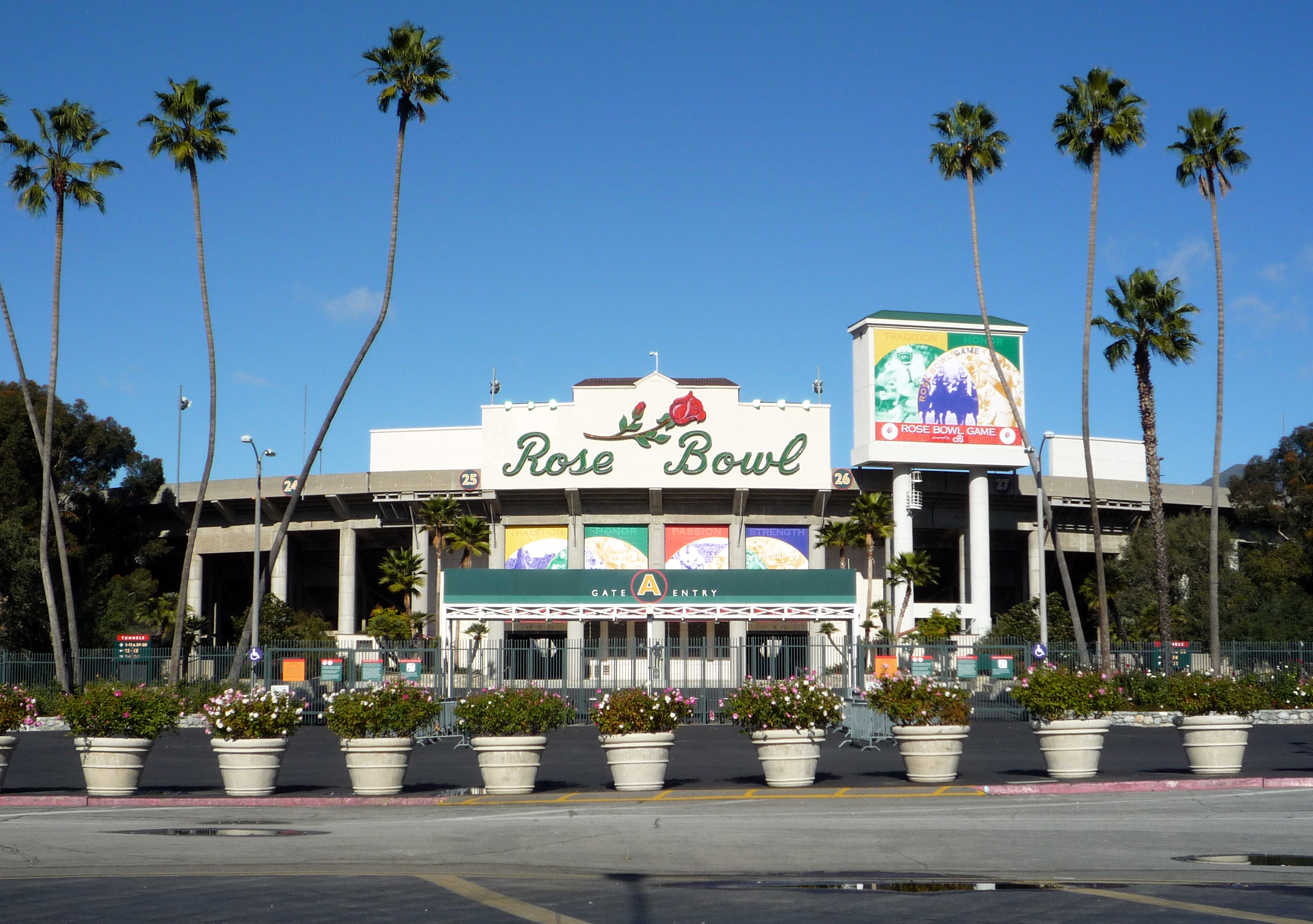
Hayes played in the 1993 Rose Bowl

After attending Booker T. Washington High School in Houston, Hayes, son of Richard Hayes, was recruited by several college football programs. He selected the University of Michigan over several elite football programs, including the Colorado Buffaloes, Florida State Seminoles, Arkansas Razorbacks, and USC Trojans. During Hayes' Michigan Wolverines career, the team's best finish was as 1992 Big Ten Conference Champions, when coached by Gary Moeller. During that year, the team finished ranked fifth nationally in both the Associated Press college football final poll and the CNN/USA Today college football final poll, and the team beat the Washington Huskies 38–31 in the January 1, 1993 Rose Bowl in a game that is memorable for Tyrone Wheatley's MVP performance. Hayes had a 10-yard reception during the game.

Hayes' 179-yard performance against the Virginia Cavaliers was the 1995 single-game high by any of the Wolverines wide receivers, tight ends and running backs, which included Amani Toomer, Jay Riemersma, Chris Howard, Jerame Tuman, Tshimanga Biakabutuka, Tai Streets and Chris Floyd. The effort tied Jack Clancy's 1966 single-game total and Amani Toomer's 1994 single-game total for fourth on the Michigan all-time single game reception yards list. It is worth noting that Clancy is the Michigan all-time single-game yardage recordholder at 197 yards. Braylon Edwards and Tai Streets have since surpassed 179 yards, in 2004 and 1998 respectively, to move the trio down to sixth. Hayes' 48 receptions and 923 yards also led all Wolverines in receiving for the 1995 season. At the end of his Michigan career, Hayes' 923 yards ranked sixth on the single-season yardage list, but it is now fifteenth. His 2144 career yards ranked fifth and now ranks eleventh. The quarterbacks during his 1995 season were Brian Griese and Scott Dreisbach. Other quarterbacks during his collegiate career were Todd Collins and Elvis Grbac.

In 1995, Hayes established the Michigan football record for most consecutive games with a reception by stringing together thirty such games. His record was broken by Marquise Walker's 32 games in 2001 and later surpassed by Braylon Edwards's 38 games and Jason Avant's 35 games. Hayes ranks tenth in career yards per reception at 17.3 and eleventh in career all-purpose yards. He is listed prominently among Michigan's all-time leaders in kickoff returns and yards as well as total returns (kickoff, punt, fumble and interception) and return yards.

Amani Toomer and Hayes were the fourth pair of Michigan receivers to have played together with 2000 career reception yards. With 2,144 career yards and 124 receptions he ranks 10th and 12th on the All-time Michigan lists 2 yards behind Desmond Howard and 1 reception behind Derrick Alexander respectively.

== Notable games ==
Hayes, who wore #9 for the Michigan Wolverines from 1992 to 1995, was recruited by University of Colorado, Florida State University, University of Arkansas, and University of Southern California. The University of Colorado was so interested in having him in the 1992 incoming class with Koy Detmer and Rashaan Salaam that they reserved their 25th scholarship for him, hoping he would change his mind after having committed to Michigan.

In the September 24, 1994 Miracle at Michigan, #7-ranked Colorado, with former Michigan coaching staff member Bill McCartney as their coach, exacted their revenge on #4-ranked Michigan. Kordell Stewart completed a 64-yard hail mary pass to Detroit native Michael Westbrook against Ty Law and Chuck Winters as time expired to complete a miracle 27–26 comeback. In the game, Hayes had 3 receptions for 62 yards as well as a run for 14 yards. He also returned 3 kickoffs for 54 yards. The ending of this game has been described as one of the two wildest finishes in University of Michigan Football history.

Hayes is notable for his 7-reception 179-yard performance culminating in a game-winning, fourth down, time expired 15-yard touchdown catch on August 26, 1995, from Scott Dreisbach to seal an 18–17 win in Michigan's greatest comeback, a record that stood for eight years until 2003, when the Wolverines pulled off a 21-point comeback against Minnesota. The reception was recorded against University of Virginia Cavaliers defensive backs Ronde Barber and Paul London in the Pigskin Classic to complete what was at the time the largest comeback in Michigan Football history in Lloyd Carr's coaching debut. The game constituted the other of the two wildest finishes in Michigan Football history.

Hayes is notable as one of the victims of Beaver Stadium attendees' ice and snowball hurling on November 18, 1995. In the game, Hayes caught 6 receptions for 132 yards and had 3 kickoff returns for 48 yards. The game ended as a 27–17 loss to the Penn State Nittany Lions.

Hayes also had season highs in reception yards as a freshman and sophomore against his hometown Houston Cougars football team. As a sophomore, he totalled 127 yards on six receptions; three punt returns for 38 yards; and two kickoff returns for 54 yards in a 42–21 win on September 25, 1993. The game included Hayes' longest punt return as a Wolverine (26 yards) and represented Hayes career high in all-purpose yards. The game was also Hayes' third highest receiving yards total and the highest total he would have until his senior season. The freshman game, Michigan's third of the season, marked Hayes' debut as a kickoff returner.

== Professional career ==
The 1996 NFL draft was a quality draft for wide receivers. Among the wide receivers drafted that year were first rounders Keyshawn Johnson, Terry Glenn, Eddie Kennison, Marvin Harrison and Eric Moulds. Additionally, Bobby Engram, Terrell Owens, Muhsin Muhammad, Joe Horn and former Michigan teammate Amani Toomer were also drafted that year. Hayes was the first of three 1996 fifth round picks by the Saints. He was drafted just after Pro Bowl wide receiver Joe Horn, the 135th pick. Mercury Hayes' NFL career longest reception of 50 yards, caught in week 14 of the 1996 National Football League season in a 26–10 loss to the St. Louis Rams, was the first NFL pass by Doug Nussmeier (Nussmeier's second pass was his only touchdown completion). Although Hayes only compiled 4 receptions for 101 yards; 2 rushes for 7 yards and 2 kickoff returns for 30 yards while appearing in 7 games, he earned nearly $39,000 in bonus money over the course of his rookie season. Hayes started the 1997 National Football League season on the New Orleans Saints' roster and appeared in 4 games.

Hayes signed with the Atlanta Falcons on October 27, 1997, and appeared in two games for the Falcons. He was released by the Falcons in the pre-season of the following year. Hayes was picked up on September 18, 1998, by the Washington Redskins and added to their practice squad, but was released 19 days later. In February 1999, he was drafted by the Barcelona Dragons, but he was released from the team five weeks later.

Mercury Hayes was signed by the Montreal Alouettes in June 1999. They released him in July and re-signed him in August. His 2000 season began productively with an impressive pre-season effort (including 67 and 77-yard touchdown runs in the same quarter of one game) followed by effective 65-yard and 68-yard regular season reception totals in early August. However, by the end of August, Hayes was on the sidelines nursing an injury. He failed to accumulate 259 yards receiving on the season, which would have placed him among the top 15 Canadian Football League receivers in yardage for the 2000 Canadian Football League season. In September, he was released from the team. In 2002, he attempted a comeback with the Norfolk Nighthawks of the af2, and this was his last attempt at professional football.

== See also ==
- Lists of Michigan Wolverines football receiving leaders
