= 2007–08 NFL playoffs =

American football tournament

- Dates: January 5 – February 3, 2008
- Season: 2007
- Teams: 12
- Games played: 11
- Super Bowl XLII site: University of Phoenix Stadium; Glendale, Arizona
- Defending champions: Indianapolis Colts
- Champion: New York Giants (7th title)
- Runner-up: New England Patriots
- Conference runners-up: Green Bay Packers; San Diego Chargers
NFL playoffs
← 2006–07	2008–09 →

The National Football League playoffs for the 2007 season began on January 5, 2008. The postseason tournament concluded with the New York Giants defeating the New England Patriots in Super Bowl XLII, 17–14, on February 3, at University of Phoenix Stadium in Glendale, Arizona.

== Participants ==
Within each conference, the four division winners and the top two non-division winners with the best overall regular season records) qualified for the playoffs. The four division winners are seeded 1–4 based on their overall won-lost-tied record, and the wild card teams are seeded 5–6. The NFL does not use a fixed bracket playoff system, and there are no restrictions regarding teams from the same division matching up in any round. In the first round, dubbed the wild-card playoffs or wild-card weekend, the third-seeded division winner hosts the sixth-seed wild card, and the fourth seed hosts the fifth. The 1 and 2 seeds from each conference received a first-round bye. In the second round, the divisional playoffs, the number 1 seed hosts the worst-surviving seed from the first round (seed 4, 5, or 6), while the number 2 seed will play the other team (seed 3, 4, or 5). The two surviving teams from each conference's divisional playoff games met in the respective AFC and NFC Conference Championship games, hosted by the higher seed. Although the Super Bowl, the championship round of the playoffs, is played at a neutral site, the designated home team is based on an annual rotation by conference.

Playoff seeds
Seed	AFC	NFC
1	New England Patriots (East winner)	Dallas Cowboys (East winner)
2	Indianapolis Colts (South winner)	Green Bay Packers (North winner)
3	San Diego Chargers (West winner)	Seattle Seahawks (West winner)
4	Pittsburgh Steelers (North winner)	Tampa Bay Buccaneers (South winner)
5	Jacksonville Jaguars (wild card)	New York Giants (wild card)
6	Tennessee Titans (wild card)	Washington Redskins (wild card)

== Bracket ==
Jan 6 – Raymond James Stadium	Jan 13 – Texas Stadium
5	NY Giants	24
5	NY Giants	21
4	Tampa Bay	14	Jan 20 – Lambeau Field
1	Dallas	17
NFC
Jan 5 – Qwest Field	5	NY Giants	23*
Jan 12 – Lambeau Field
2	Green Bay	20
6	Washington	14	NFC Championship
3	Seattle	20
3	Seattle	35	Feb 3 – University of Phoenix Stadium
2	Green Bay	42
Wild Card playoffs
Divisional playoffs
Jan 6 – Qualcomm Stadium	N5	NY Giants	17
Jan 13 – RCA Dome
A1	New England	14
6	Tennessee	6	Super Bowl XLII
3	San Diego	28
3	San Diego	17	Jan 20 – Gillette Stadium
2	Indianapolis	24
AFC
Jan 5 – Heinz Field	3	San Diego	12
Jan 12 – Gillette Stadium
1	New England	21
5	Jacksonville	31	AFC Championship
5	Jacksonville	20
4	Pittsburgh	29
1	New England	31

* Indicates overtime victory

== Schedule ==
In the United States, NBC broadcast the first two Wild Card playoff games, then CBS broadcast the rest of the AFC playoff games. Fox televised the rest of the NFC games and Super Bowl XLII.

Round	Away team	Score	Home team	Date	Kickoff (ET / UTC−5)	TV
Wild-card round	Washington Redskins	14–35	Seattle Seahawks	January 5, 2008	4:30 p.m.	NBC
Wild-card round	Jacksonville Jaguars	31–29	Pittsburgh Steelers	January 5, 2008	8:00 p.m.	NBC
Wild-card round	New York Giants	24–14	Tampa Bay Buccaneers	January 6, 2008	1:00 p.m.	Fox
Wild-card round	Tennessee Titans	6–17	San Diego Chargers	January 6, 2008	4:30 p.m.	CBS
Divisional round	Seattle Seahawks	20–42	Green Bay Packers	January 12, 2008	4:30 p.m.	Fox
Divisional round	Jacksonville Jaguars	20–31	New England Patriots	January 12, 2008	8:00 p.m.	CBS
Divisional round	San Diego Chargers	28–24	Indianapolis Colts	January 13, 2008	1:00 p.m.	CBS
Divisional round	New York Giants	21–17	Dallas Cowboys	January 13, 2008	4:30 p.m.	Fox
Conference championships	San Diego Chargers	12–21	New England Patriots	January 20, 2008	3:00 p.m.	CBS
Conference championships	New York Giants	23–20 (OT)	Green Bay Packers	January 20, 2008	6:30 p.m.	Fox
Super Bowl XLII University of Phoenix Stadium Glendale, Arizona	New York Giants	17–14	New England Patriots	February 3, 2008	6:30 p.m.	Fox

== Wild-card round ==
=== Saturday, January 5, 2008 ===
==== NFC: Seattle Seahawks 35, Washington Redskins 14 ====
Washington Redskins vs. Seattle Seahawks – Game summary

Quarter	1	2	3	4	Total
Redskins	0	0	0	14	14
Seahawks	7	3	3	22	35

at Qwest Field, Seattle, Washington

- Game time: 4:30 p.m. EST/1:30 p.m. PST
- Game weather: 42 °F (6 °C), partly sunny
- Game attendance: 68,298
- Referee: Walt Coleman
- TV announcers (NBC): Tom Hammond (play-by-play), Cris Collinsworth (color commentator), and Bob Neumeier (sideline reporter)

Game information

First quarter

- SEA – Leonard Weaver 17-yard run (Josh Brown kick), 3:45. Seahawks 7–0. Drive: 6 plays, 45 yards, 3:21.

Second quarter

- SEA – Josh Brown 50-yard field goal, 8:58. Seahawks 10–0. Drive: 5 plays, 33 yards, 1:42.

Third quarter

- SEA – Josh Brown 33-yard field goal, 4:30. Seahawks 13–0. Drive: 8 plays, 52 yards, 4:24.

Fourth quarter

- WAS – Antwaan Randle El 7-yard pass from Todd Collins (Shaun Suisham kick), 14:53. Seahawks 13–7. Drive: 12 plays, 84 yards, 4:37.
- WAS – Santana Moss 30-yard pass from Todd Collins (Shaun Suisham kick), 12:38. Redskins 14–13. Drive: 3 plays, 42 yards, 1:19.
- SEA – D. J. Hackett 20-yard pass from Matt Hasselbeck (Marcus Pollard pass from Matt Hasselbeck), 6:06. Seahawks 21–14. Drive: 5 plays, 42 yards, 1:57.
- SEA – Marcus Trufant 78-yard interception return (Josh Brown kick), 5:38. Seahawks 28–14.
- SEA – Jordan Babineaux 57-yard interception return (Josh Brown kick), 0:27. Seahawks 35–14.

Top passers

- WAS – Todd Collins – 29/50, 266 yards, 2 TD, 2 INT
- SEA – Matt Hasselbeck – 20/32, 229 yards, TD, 2 INT

Top rushers

- WAS – Clinton Portis – 20 rushes, 52 yards
- SEA – Shaun Alexander – 15 rushes, 46 yards

Top receivers

- WAS – Antwaan Randle El – 10 receptions, 94 yards, TD
- SEA – D. J. Hackett – 6 receptions, 101 yards, TD

The Redskins rallied back from a 13-point deficit in the fourth quarter, but Seattle responded by intercepting two passes from Todd Collins, who hadn't thrown an interception in any of his games since replacing injured starter Jason Campbell, and scoring 22 points during the last six minutes of the game.

Midway through the first quarter, Seattle receiver Nate Burleson returned a punt 20 yards to the Washington 45-yard line, setting up Leonard Weaver's 17-yard touchdown run. In the second quarter, Burleson returned a punt 19 yards and a caught a 25-yard pass to set up a 50-yard field goal by Josh Brown, giving the Seahawks a 10–0 lead by halftime. Meanwhile, Seattle's defense forced the Redskins to punt on all of their possessions and did not allow them to move the ball more than 30 yards.

In the third quarter, Seattle quarterback Matt Hasselbeck completed four consecutive passes for 47 yards, including a 35-yard completion to D. J. Hackett, setting up Brown's second field goal to increase their lead to 13–0. Collins led the Redskins 84 yards in 12 plays and finished the drive with a 7-yard touchdown pass to Antwaan Randle El on the first play of the fourth quarter. Then shortly after the ensuing kickoff, Redskins safety LaRon Landry intercepted a pass from Hasselbeck and returned it to the Seattle 42-yard line. Two plays later, Collins threw a 30-yard touchdown pass to Santana Moss, giving them their first lead of the game at 14–13.

The ensuing kickoff took an odd bounce away from Seattle and was recovered by Washington at the Seahawks 14-yard line. But the Redskins failed to gain a first down after three plays and came up empty when Shaun Suisham missed a 30-yard field goal attempt. A few plays after the missed field goal, Landry recorded his second interception of the game, picking off a deep pass from Hasselbeck on his own 9-yard line. But Washington was forced to punt again, and Derrick Frost's punt went just 33 yards to the Seattle 42. Four plays later, Hasselbeck threw a 20-yard touchdown pass to Hackett, and then followed it up with a 2-point conversion pass to Marcus Pollard, giving the Seahawks a 21–14 lead. Then on the first play after the ensuing kickoff, Seattle cornerback Marcus Trufant intercepted a pass from Collins and returned it 78 yards for a touchdown. The Redskins responded with a drive to Seattle's 31-yard line, but turned the ball over on downs. Then after a punt, Seahawks safety Jordan Babineaux intercepted Collins and returned the ball 57 yards for a touchdown with 27 seconds left in the game, making the final score 35–14.

Burleson finished the game with 167 total yards, including six punt returns for a franchise playoff record 84 yards.

This was the second postseason meeting between the Redskins and Seahawks, with Seattle winning the only prior meeting 20–10 in the 2005 NFC Divisional playoffs.

==== AFC: Jacksonville Jaguars 31, Pittsburgh Steelers 29 ====
Jacksonville Jaguars vs. Pittsburgh Steelers – Game summary

Quarter	1	2	3	4	Total
Jaguars	7	14	7	3	31
Steelers	7	0	3	19	29

at Heinz Field, Pittsburgh, Pennsylvania

- Game time: 8:00 p.m. EST
- Game weather: 39 °F (4 °C), light rain
- Game attendance: 63,629
- Referee: Scott Green
- TV announcers (NBC): Al Michaels (play-by-play), John Madden (color commentator), and Andrea Kremer (sideline reporter)

Game information

First quarter

- PIT – Najeh Davenport 1-yard run (Jeff Reed kick), 10:03. Steelers 7–0. Drive: 10 plays, 80 yards, 4:57.
- JAX – Fred Taylor 1-yard run (Josh Scobee kick), 9:39. Tied 7–7. Drive: 1 play, 1 yard, 0:24.

Second quarter

- JAX – Rashean Mathis 63-yard interception return (Josh Scobee kick), 10:19. Jaguars 14–7.
- JAX – Maurice Jones-Drew 43-yard pass from David Garrard (Josh Scobee kick), 8:34. Jaguars 21–7. Drive: 3 plays, 46 yards, 0:56.

Third quarter

- PIT – Jeff Reed 28-yard field goal, 9:24. Jaguars 21–10. Drive: 8 plays, 33 yards, 4:45.
- JAX – Maurice Jones-Drew 10-yard run (Josh Scobee kick), 4:39. Jaguars 28–10. Drive: 8 plays, 82 yards, 4:45.

Fourth quarter

- PIT – Santonio Holmes 37-yard pass from Ben Roethlisberger (Jeff Reed kick), 14:53. Jaguars 28–17. Drive: 10 plays, 69 yards, 4:46.
- PIT – Heath Miller 14-yard pass from Ben Roethlisberger (run failed), 10:25. Jaguars 28–23. Drive: 10 plays, 69 yards, 3:49.
- PIT – Najeh Davenport 1-yard run (pass failed), 6:21. Steelers 29–28. Drive: 7 plays, 16 yards, 2:29.
- JAX – Josh Scobee 25-yard field goal, 0:37. Jaguars 31–29. Drive: 8 plays, 44 yards, 2:01.

Top passers

- JAX – David Garrard – 9/21, 140 yards, TD, 2 INT
- PIT – Ben Roethlisberger – 29/42, 337 yards, 2 TD, 3 INT

Top rushers

- JAX – David Garrard – 5 rushes, 58 yards
- PIT – Najeh Davenport – 16 rushes, 25 yards, 2 TD

Top receivers

- JAX – Maurice Jones-Drew – 1 reception, 43 yards, TD
- PIT – Hines Ward – 10 receptions, 135 yards

In a rematch of week 15, Jacksonville gained only 239 yards of offense, but still managed to win on Josh Scobee's 25-yard field goal with 37 seconds left. The Jaguars defense sacked Steelers quarterback Ben Roethlisberger six times, intercepted three of his passes, and forced him to lose a fumble on the final drive of the game. It was their first playoff win in eight years and their first playoff win on the road in ten years. For the Steelers, it marked the first time in franchise history they lost to one team at home two times in a season.

Pittsburgh opened up the scoring by marching 80 yards in 10 plays on their first drive and finishing it off with Najeh Davenport's 1-yard touchdown run. But Jaguars running back Maurice Jones-Drew returned the ensuing kickoff 96 yards to the 1-yard line, and Fred Taylor scored a 1-yard touchdown run on the next play.

Early in the second quarter, Jacksonville cornerback Rashean Mathis intercepted a pass from Roethlisberger and returned it 63 yards for a touchdown. Then shortly after the kickoff, Mathis intercepted another pass at the Steelers 46-yard line, setting up David Garrard's 43-yard touchdown pass to Jones-Drew and making the score 21–7. Later in the second quarter, the Steelers took advantage of a missed Scobee field goal by driving all the way to the Jaguars 21-yard line. But defensive tackle Derek Landri intercepted a short pass from Roethlisberger, and the score remained 21–7 at halftime.

In the second half, the Steelers scored on their first four drives. Three plays after the opening kickoff, linebacker James Farrior's interception of a Garrard pass set up Jeff Reed's 28-yard field goal. Jacksonville responded by driving 82 yards in eight plays, with Garrard rushing for 15 yards and completing two passes to Ernest Wilford for 39, while Jones-Drew capped the drive with a 10-yard touchdown run, increasing their lead to 28–10. But the Steelers drove right back, and on the first play of the fourth quarter, facing fourth down and 12 on the Jags 37-yard line, Roethlisberger threw a 37-yard touchdown pass to Santonio Holmes. Then after a punt, Roethlisberger completed six passes for 65 yards on a 69-yard drive that ended with his 14-yard touchdown pass to Heath Miller. The Steelers attempted a two-point conversion to cut the lead to three points, and Roethlisberger initially completed a pass to Hines Ward, but the play was nullified by a holding penalty and Pittsburgh's second attempt was incomplete, keeping the score at 28–23.

Three plays after the ensuing kickoff, Steelers cornerback Ike Taylor intercepted a pass from Garrard and returned it 31 yards to the Jacksonville 16-yard line. Following a pass interference penalty against the Jaguars in the end zone on a fourth down play, Davenport scored his second 1-yard touchdown run of the day. The two-point conversion failed again, but the Steelers took the lead, 29–28.

Jacksonville was unable to score on their next drive, but they forced the Steelers to punt after three plays and Dennis Northcutt returned the punt 16 yards, giving the Jaguars the ball at their own 49-yard line with one timeout remaining and 2:38 left to play. Three plays later on fourth down and 2, Garrard dropped back to pass, but then ran back to the line and took off for a 32-yard burst to the Steelers 11-yard line. After a few more running plays, Scobee kicked a 25-yard field goal, giving his team a 31–29 lead. The Steelers got the ball back with 37 seconds left, but Jaguars defensive end Bobby McCray sealed the victory by forcing a fumble from Roethlisberger which was recovered by Landri.

This was the first postseason meeting between the Jaguars and Steelers.

=== Sunday, January 6, 2008 ===
==== NFC: New York Giants 24, Tampa Bay Buccaneers 14 ====
New York Giants vs. Tampa Bay Buccaneers – Game summary

Quarter	1	2	3	4	Total
Giants	0	14	3	7	24
Buccaneers	7	0	0	7	14

at Raymond James Stadium, Tampa, Florida

- Game time: 1:00 p.m. EST
- Game weather: 70 °F (21 °C), sunny
- Game attendance: 65,621
- Referee: Walt Anderson
- TV announcers (Fox): Joe Buck (play-by-play), Troy Aikman (color commentator), Pam Oliver, and Chris Myers (sideline reporters)

Game information

First quarter

- TB – Earnest Graham 1-yard run (Matt Bryant kick), 1:49. Buccaneers 7–0. Drive: 10 plays, 54 yards, 5:13.

Second quarter

- NYG – Brandon Jacobs 5-yard pass from Eli Manning (Lawrence Tynes kick), 10:02. Tied 7–7. Drive: 8 plays, 53 yards, 4:04.
- NYG – Brandon Jacobs 8-yard run (Lawrence Tynes kick), 4:06. Giants 14–7. Drive: 7 plays, 65 yards, 4:23.

Third quarter

- NYG – Lawrence Tynes 25-yard field goal, 9:56. Giants 17–7. Drive: 9 plays, 23 yards, 4:54.

Fourth quarter

- NYG – Amani Toomer 4-yard pass from Eli Manning (Lawrence Tynes kick), 8:03. Giants 24–7. Drive: 15 plays, 92 yards, 8:37
- TB – Alex Smith 6-yard pass from Jeff Garcia (Matt Bryant kick), 3:25. Giants 24–14. Drive: 12 plays, 88 yards, 4:38.

Top passers

- NYG – Eli Manning – 20/27, 185 yards, 2 TD
- TB – Jeff Garcia – 23/39, 207 yards, TD, 2 INT

Top rushers

- NYG – Ahmad Bradshaw – 17 rushes, 66 yards
- TB – Earnest Graham – 18 rushes, 63 yards, TD

Top receivers

- NYG – Amani Toomer – 7 receptions, 74 yards, TD
- TB – Michael Pittman – 5 receptions, 62 yards

Eli Manning completed 20 of 27 passes for 185 yards and two touchdowns, while the Giants' defense forced three turnovers and held the Buccaneers to 271 total yards for a Giants victory. The Giants won their first playoff game since the 2000 NFC Championship Game, their first road playoff game since the 1990 NFC Championship Game, and extended their road winning streak to eight games, while the Buccaneers lost in the opening round at home for the second time in three seasons.

Tampa Bay scored first with Earnest Graham's 1-yard touchdown run late in the first quarter. Early in the second quarter, a 14-yard punt return by Giants cornerback R. W. McQuarters gave New York the ball on their own 47-yard line. Following three receptions by Amani Toomer for 40 yards, Manning threw a 4-yard touchdown pass to Brandon Jacobs to tie the game. Then after a punt, Manning completed four consecutive passes for 50 yards on a 65-yard drive that ended with Jacobs' second touchdown on an 8-yard run.

Micheal Spurlock fumbled the second half kickoff, and it was recovered by New York cornerback Corey Webster, setting up a 25-yard field goal from Lawrence Tynes to make the score 17–7. Tampa Bay responded with a drive to the Giants 25-yard line, but Webster ended it by intercepting a pass from Jeff Garcia in the end zone. Following an exchange of punts, the Giants drove 92 yards and increased their lead to 24–7 with Manning's 4-yard touchdown pass to Toomer.

With 3:25 left in the game, Garcia's 6-yard touchdown pass to Alex Smith cut the score to 24–14. The Buccaneers then managed to force a punt, but McQuarters picked off a pass from Garcia with less than two minutes left to put the game away. This was the most recent playoff appearance for the Buccaneers until the 2020 season.

This was the first postseason meeting between the Giants and Buccaneers.

==== AFC: San Diego Chargers 17, Tennessee Titans 6 ====
Tennessee Titans vs. San Diego Chargers – Game summary

Quarter	1	2	3	4	Total
Titans	3	3	0	0	6
Chargers	0	0	10	7	17

at Qualcomm Stadium, San Diego, California

- Game time: 4:30 p.m. EST/1:30 p.m. PST
- Game weather: 57 °F (14 °C), showers
- Game attendance: 65,640
- Referee: Ed Hochuli
- TV announcers (CBS): Jim Nantz (play-by-play) and Phil Simms (color commentator)

Game information

First quarter

- TEN – Rob Bironas 30-yard field goal, 9:37. Titans 3–0. Drive: 13 plays, 61 yards, 5:23.

Second quarter

- TEN – Rob Bironas 44-yard field goal, 0:00. Titans 6–0. Drive: 11 plays, 39 yards, 3:06.

Third quarter

- SD – Nate Kaeding 20-yard field goal, 9:41. Titans 6–3. Drive: 12 plays, 86 yards, 5:19.
- SD – Vincent Jackson 25-yard pass from Philip Rivers (Nate Kaeding kick), 2:35. Chargers 10–6. Drive: 7 plays, 78 yards, 3:54.

Fourth quarter

- SD – LaDainian Tomlinson 1-yard run (Nate Kaeding kick), 8:45. Chargers 17–6. Drive: 12 plays, 72 yards, 5:18.

Top passers

- TEN – Vince Young – 16/29, 138 yards, INT
- SD – Philip Rivers – 19/30, 292 yards, TD, INT

Top rushers

- TEN – LenDale White – 19 rushes, 69 yards
- SD – LaDainian Tomlinson – 21 rushes, 42 yards, TD

Top receivers

- TEN – Ben Troupe – 3 receptions, 44 yards
- SD – Chris Chambers – 6 receptions, 121 yards

San Diego held the Titans to 248 yards and two field goals, while also forcing two turnovers, en route to their first playoff win since the 1994 AFC Championship Game.

The Titans started off the scoring with a field goal from Rob Bironas on their opening drive. Early in the second quarter, Tennessee drove all the way to the Chargers' 13-yard line, but running back Chris Brown fumbled the ball while being tackled by Shawne Merriman and linebacker Shaun Phillips recovered it. Meanwhile, the Chargers offense was limited to three punts and a missed field goal, while Titans cornerback Cortland Finnegan also intercepted a pass from Philip Rivers in the end zone. And on the last play of the half, Bironas kicked another field goal to give Tennessee a 6–0 lead.

However, the Chargers scored 17 points on three consecutive possessions in the second half. First, two 19-yard receptions by Chris Chambers and a 34-yard catch by Vincent Jackson set up Nate Kaeding's 20-yard field goal to put San Diego on the board. Then seven plays after forcing the Titans to punt, Rivers threw a 20-yard scoring strike to Jackson, giving the Chargers their first lead of the game. Tennessee responded with a drive to the San Diego 20-yard line, only to have Bironas miss a 38-yard field goal attempt. On San Diego's ensuing drive, Rivers completed a 39-yard pass to Chambers at the Titans 8-yard line. Three plays later, faced with fourth down and goal on the 1-yard line, San Diego decided to go for the score. Running back LaDainian Tomlinson took a handoff, dove over a pile of players and stretched the ball over the goal line for the touchdown, which was upheld after a Titans challenge, increasing the Chargers' lead to 17–6. The San Diego defense then took over the rest of the game, forcing a punt and an interception on the last two Tennessee drives.

This was the fourth postseason meeting between the Titans and Chargers. The Titans had won all three prior meetings, including the most recent as the Houston Oilers 17–14 in the 1979 AFC Divisional playoffs.

== Divisional round ==
=== Saturday, January 12, 2008 ===
==== NFC: Green Bay Packers 42, Seattle Seahawks 20 ====
Seattle Seahawks vs. Green Bay Packers – Game summary

Quarter	1	2	3	4	Total
Seahawks	14	3	3	0	20
Packers	14	14	7	7	42

at Lambeau Field, Green Bay, Wisconsin

- Game time: 4:30 p.m. EST/3:30 p.m. CST
- Game weather: 31 °F (−1 °C), light snow
- Game attendance: 72,168
- Referee: Mike Carey
- TV announcers (Fox): Kenny Albert (play-by-play), Daryl Johnston (color commentator), and Tony Siragusa (sideline reporter)

Game information

First quarter

- SEA – Shaun Alexander 1-yard run (Josh Brown kick), 14:40. Seahawks 7–0. Drive: 1 play, 1 yard, 0:03.
- SEA – Bobby Engram 11-yard pass from Matt Hasselbeck (Josh Brown kick), 10:59. Seahawks 14–0. Drive: 6 plays, 49 yards, 2:52.
- GB – Greg Jennings 15-yard pass from Brett Favre (Mason Crosby kick), 7:08. Seahawks 14–7. Drive: 6 plays, 68 yards, 3:51.
- GB – Ryan Grant 1-yard run (Mason Crosby kick), 1:02. Tied 14–14. Drive: 9 plays, 64 yards, 4:50.

Second quarter

- GB – Greg Jennings 2-yard pass from Brett Favre (Mason Crosby kick), 13:22. Packers 21–14. Drive: 3 plays, 18 yards, 1:32.
- SEA – Josh Brown 29-yard field goal, 7:18. Packers 21–17. Drive: 11 plays, 63 yards, 6:04.
- GB – Ryan Grant 3-yard run (Mason Crosby kick), 0:26. Packers 28–17. Drive: 14 plays, 70 yards, 6:52.

Third quarter

- GB – Brandon Jackson 13-yard pass from Brett Favre (Mason Crosby kick), 10:25. Packers 35–17. Drive: 6 plays, 66 yards, 3:29.
- SEA – Josh Brown 27-yard field goal, 2:46. Packers 35–20. Drive: 14 plays, 70 yards, 7:39.

Fourth quarter

- GB – Ryan Grant 1-yard run (Mason Crosby kick), 13:26. Packers 42–20. Drive: 7 plays, 65 yards, 4:20.

Top passers

- SEA – Matt Hasselbeck – 19/33, 194 yards, TD
- GB – Brett Favre – 18/23, 173 yards, 3 TD

Top rushers

- SEA – Shaun Alexander – 9 rushes, 20 yards, TD
- GB – Ryan Grant – 27 rushes, 201 yards, 3 TD

Top receivers

- SEA – Bobby Engram – 6 receptions, 67 yards, TD
- GB – Greg Jennings – 6 receptions, 71 yards, 2 TD

Despite falling behind 14–0 in the first quarter, Green Bay gained 408 yards of offense and scored touchdowns on six consecutive drives to defeat the Seahawks and advance to their first NFC Championship Game in 10 years. Meanwhile, the Packers' defense limited Seattle to just 200 total yards, with only 28 yards on the ground. Packers running back Ryan Grant, who fumbled twice in the first quarter, ended up with a franchise playoff record 201 rushing yards and three touchdowns.

Both of Grant's fumbles in the first quarter were converted into Seattle touchdowns. On the first play of the game, Seahawks linebacker Lofa Tatupu recovered Grant's fumble and returned it 12 yards to the Green Bay 1-yard line, setting up Shaun Alexander's 1-yard touchdown run on the next play. Then shortly after the ensuing kickoff, Grant, who only fumbled once during the regular season, lost another fumble which was recovered by Jordan Babineaux at the Packers 49-yard line. Five plays later, Seattle quarterback Matt Hasselbeck threw an 11-yard touchdown pass to Bobby Engram, giving the Seahawks a 14–0 lead just four minutes into the game.

However, the Packers responded with a touchdown on all of their ensuing possessions until early in the fourth quarter. First, quarterback Brett Favre completed four consecutive passes for 65 yards and finished the drive with a 15-yard touchdown pass to Greg Jennings. Then after a punt, the Packers drove 64 yards in nine plays, with Grant rushing the ball four times for 43 yards and finishing it off with a 1-yard touchdown run to tie the game.

On the first play of the second quarter, with heavy snow falling, Green Bay defensive end Aaron Kampman recovered a fumble from Marcus Pollard on the Seahawks 18-yard line. Following two carries for 16 yards by Grant, Favre threw a 2-yard touchdown pass to Jennings. Aided by a 15-yard roughing the punter penalty against Green Bay on fourth down, Seattle responded by driving to the Packers 10-yard line where Josh Brown kicked a field goal to cut the score to 21–17. But Green Bay then moved the ball 70 yards in 14 plays and scored with Grant's 3-yard touchdown run to give them a 28–17 lead at halftime.

After a Seahawks punt began the second half, Favre completed a 24-yard pass to Jennings and Grant broke off a 24-yard run to the Seahawks 12-yard line, setting up Favre's 13-yard touchdown pass to Brandon Jackson. Hasselbeck responded by completing six of seven passes for 68 yards en route to another Brown field goal, but Grant's 43-yard run on the Packers next drive set up his third touchdown of the day, making the final score 42–20.

This was the second postseason meeting between the Seahawks and Packers. Green Bay won the only prior meeting 33–27 in OT in the 2003 NFC Wild Card playoffs.

==== AFC: New England Patriots 31, Jacksonville Jaguars 20 ====
Jacksonville Jaguars vs. New England Patriots – Game summary

Quarter	1	2	3	4	Total
Jaguars	7	7	3	3	20
Patriots	7	7	14	3	31

at Gillette Stadium, Foxborough, Massachusetts

- Game time: 8:00 p.m. EST
- Game weather: 37 °F (3 °C), cloudy and cool
- Game attendance: 68,756
- Referee: Jerome Boger
- TV announcers (CBS): Jim Nantz (play-by-play) and Phil Simms (color commentator)

Game information

First quarter

- JAX – Matt Jones 8-yard pass from David Garrard (Josh Scobee kick), 10:50. Jaguars 7–0. Drive: 9 plays, 80 yards, 4:10.
- NE – Benjamin Watson 3-yard pass from Tom Brady (Stephen Gostkowski kick), 5:01. Tied 7–7. Drive: 10 plays, 74 yards, 5:49.

Second quarter

- NE – Laurence Maroney 1-yard run (Stephen Gostkowski kick), 14:57. Patriots 14–7. Drive: 7 plays, 29 yards, 3:33.
- JAX – Ernest Wilford 6-yard pass from David Garrard (Josh Scobee kick), 7:46. Tied 14–14. Drive: 11 plays, 95 yards, 7:11.

Third quarter

- NE – Wes Welker 6-yard pass from Tom Brady (Stephen Gostkowski kick), 8:49. Patriots 21–14. Drive: 11 plays, 82 yards, 6:11.
- JAX – Josh Scobee 39-yard field goal, 4:04. Patriots 21–17. Drive: 9 plays, 48 yards, 4:45.
- NE – Ben Watson 9-yard pass from Tom Brady (Stephen Gostkowski kick), 0:49. Patriots 28–17. Drive: 6 plays, 76 yards, 3:15.

Fourth quarter

- JAX – Josh Scobee 25-yard field goal, 9:44. Patriots 28–20. Drive: 13 plays, 86 yards, 6:05.
- NE – Stephen Gostowski 35-yard field goal, 6:39. Patriots 31–20. Drive: 6 plays, 63 yards, 3:05.

Top passers

- JAX – David Garrard – 22/33, 278 yards, 2 TD, INT
- NE – Tom Brady – 26/28, 262 yards, 3 TD

Top rushers

- JAX – Fred Taylor – 13 rushes, 47 yards
- NE – Laurence Maroney – 22 rushes, 122 yards, TD

Top receivers

- JAX – Marcedes Lewis – 4 receptions, 74 yards
- NE – Donté Stallworth – 3 receptions, 68 yards

Patriots quarterback Tom Brady threw for 263 yards and three touchdowns, while running back Laurence Maroney added 162 total yards (122 yards on the ground). Overall, New England gained 401 yards and didn't punt the ball until 31 seconds remained in the fourth quarter.

Jacksonville took the opening kickoff and went 80 yards in nine plays, featuring two receptions by Marcedes Lewis for 57 yards, on the way to David Garrard's 9-yard touchdown pass to Matt Jones. The Patriots then went on a 74-yard drive and scored with Tom Brady's 3-yard touchdown pass to Benjamin Watson. On Jacksonville's next possession, New England defensive end Ty Warren forced a fumble while sacking Garrard, and linebacker Mike Vrabel recovered it at the Jaguars 29-yard line. Several plays later, Maroney scored a 1-yard touchdown run to give New England a 14–7 lead.

Jaguars running back Maurice Jones-Drew muffed the ensuing kickoff and was downed at his own 5-yard line. The Jaguars then moved the ball 95 yards in 11 plays without even facing a third down and scored with Garrard's 6-yard touchdown pass to Ernest Wilford. For the third time in a row, New England drove deep into Jacksonville territory. But this time the drive stalled at the 17-yard line and ended with no points when Stephen Gostkowski missed a 35-yard field goal with 53 seconds left in the first half.

On the opening drive of the second half, Brady completed seven of eight passes for 54 yards on an 82-yard drive. On the last play, he took a snap in shotgun formation with Kevin Faulk to his right, Brady jumped in the air with his arms raised to make it look like a play used by the Patriots before where Faulk took the direct snap. The Jaguars defense followed Faulk, leaving Wes Welker open in the end zone, and Brady threw him the ball for a touchdown to give the Patriots a 21–14 lead. Jacksonville responded with a drive to the New England 21-yard line, but receiver Dennis Northcutt dropped a pass on third down, forcing them to settle for a Josh Scobee 39-yard field goal, cutting the score to 21–17. On New England's next drive, Jacksonville's Derek Landri was assessed a roughing-the-passer penalty, turning Welker's 6-yard catch into a 21-yard gain. Maroney gained 40 yards with his next two carries, and following two more Welker receptions, Brady threw a 9-yard touchdown pass to Watson giving New England a 28–17 lead.

An unnecessary roughness penalty and a 25-yard reception by Reggie Williams on Jacksonville's next drive set up a 25-yard field goal by Scobee, which cut the Jaguars deficit to one touchdown, 28–20. On the second play after the kickoff, Brady completed a 52-yard strike to Donté Stallworth, setting up Gostkowski's second field goal attempt to put New England back up by two scores, 31–20.

Then, with 3:46 left in the game, Pats safety Rodney Harrison, intercepted a pass from Garrard at the Patriots' 31-yard line, ending any hope of a Jacksonville comeback. Harrison's interception was his seventh career postseason pick, a Patriots record. This was also his fourth consecutive postseason game with an interception, tying an NFL record held by Aeneas Williams.

With this win, the Patriots advanced to the AFC title game for the second year in a row and extended their perfect record to 17–0, matching the final record of the 1972 Miami Dolphins.

This would be the Jacksonville Jaguars' last postseason appearance until 2017.

This was the fourth postseason meeting between the Jaguars and Patriots, with New England winning two of the prior three meetings, including 28–3 in the 2005 AFC Wild Card playoffs.

=== Sunday, January 13, 2008 ===
==== AFC: San Diego Chargers 28, Indianapolis Colts 24 ====
San Diego Chargers vs. Indianapolis Colts – Game summary

Quarter	1	2	3	4	Total
Chargers	0	7	14	7	28
Colts	7	3	7	7	24

at RCA Dome, Indianapolis, Indiana

- Game time: 1:00 p.m. EST
- Game weather: Played indoors, domed stadium
- Game attendance: 56,930
- Referee: Gerald Austin
- TV announcers (CBS): Greg Gumbel (play-by-play) and Dan Dierdorf (color commentator)

Game information

First quarter

- IND – Dallas Clark 25-yard pass from Peyton Manning (Adam Vinatieri kick), 9:13. Colts 7–0. Drive: 9 plays, 76 yards, 5:47.

Second quarter

- SD – Vincent Jackson 14-yard pass from Philip Rivers (Nate Kaeding kick), 8:38. Tied 7–7. Drive: 10 plays, 78 yards, 7:16.
- IND – Adam Vinatieri 47-yard field goal, 5:10. Colts 10–7. Drive: 8 plays, 44 yards, 3:28.

Third quarter

- SD – Chris Chambers 30-yard pass from Philip Rivers (Nate Kaeding kick), 11:33. Chargers 14–10. Drive: 6 plays, 83 yards, 3:27.
- IND – Reggie Wayne 9-yard pass from Peyton Manning (Adam Vinatieri kick), 2:53. Colts 17–14. Drive: 5 plays, 50 yards, 3:02.
- SD – Darren Sproles 56-yard pass from Philip Rivers (Nate Kaeding kick), 0:00. Chargers 21–17. Drive: 5 plays, 74 yards, 2:53.

Fourth quarter

- IND – Anthony Gonzalez 55-yard pass from Peyton Manning (Adam Vinatieri kick), 10:07. Colts 24–21. Drive: 3 plays, 56 yards, 0:43.
- SD – Billy Volek 1-yard run (Nate Kaeding kick), 4:50. Chargers 28–24. Drive: 8 plays, 78 yards, 5:17.

Top passers

- SD – Philip Rivers – 14/19, 264 yards, 3 TD, INT
- IND – Peyton Manning – 33/48, 402 yards, 3 TD, 2 INT

Top rushers

- SD – Michael Turner – 17 rushes, 71 yards
- IND – Joseph Addai – 13 rushes, 43 yards

Top receivers

- SD – Vincent Jackson – 7 receptions, 93 yards, TD
- IND – Dallas Clark – 6 receptions, 95 yards, TD

Despite the loss of starting quarterback Philip Rivers and running back LaDainian Tomlinson (the NFL's leading rusher during the season), San Diego still managed to defeat the defending Super Bowl champion Colts in what would be the final game in the RCA Dome.

The Colts started out the game on a 76-yard drive and scored on Peyton Manning's 25-yard touchdown pass to tight end Dallas Clark. Then Kelvin Hayden intercepted a pass from Rivers on the Colts 24-yard line and the Colts moved the ball to the San Diego 40-yard line. However, Indianapolis receiver Marvin Harrison, playing in his first game back from an injury in nearly three months, fumbled the ball while being tackled by Antonio Cromartie, and Marlon McCree recovered it. Following the turnover, San Diego drove 78 yards and tied the game with Rivers' 14-yard touchdown pass to Vincent Jackson. Manning responded by completing three passes for 42 yards on a 44-yard drive that ended with an Adam Vinatieri field goal to give the Colts a 10–7 lead. Both teams blew scoring opportunities on their next drives. First the Chargers drove to the Indianapolis 31-yard line, only to have Nate Kaeding miss a 48-yard field goal. Then the Colts advanced to the Chargers 35-yard line, but on their last play of the half, Manning's pass was intercepted by Cromartie. Cromartie's 89-yard touchdown return was called back by a holding penalty, but he managed to prevent the Colts from scoring and it remained 10–7 at halftime.

The Chargers took the second half kickoff and quickly took the lead with a 30-yard touchdown catch from Chris Chambers. Once again the Colts drove into Chargers territory, moving the ball all the way to the San Diego 4-yard line. But on third down and 3, Manning's pass was intercepted by Eric Weddle. However, the Chargers could only move the ball to their own 6-yard line and T. J. Rushing returned their punt 12-yards to midfield. This time the Colts drove 50 yards and scored with Manning's 9-yard touchdown pass to Reggie Wayne. Wayne was initially ruled out of bounds at the 7, but a Colts challenge showed he remained in bounds on the way to the touchdown, and the Colts took the lead, 17–14. On the Chargers ensuing drive, Rivers threw a 22-yard completion to Chambers and followed it up with a 56-yard touchdown pass to Darren Sproles, a special teams returner who was brought in on offense as an extra receiver.

With 10:50 left in the fourth quarter, Indianapolis retook the lead with Manning's 55-yard touchdown pass to Anthony Gonzalez, who caught the ball along the left sideline and narrowly managed to keep his feet in bounds en route to a score, which was upheld after a Chargers challenge. But San Diego, now led by second-string quarterback Billy Volek, drove 78 yards in eight plays and scored with Volek's 1-yard touchdown run, giving them a 28–24 lead with 4:50 left in regulation. Manning led the Colts down the field, moving the ball 70 yards and converting a fourth down and 5 with a 16-yard completion to Clark. But he threw three consecutive incompletions from the Chargers 7-yard line, turning the ball over on downs. Indianapolis' defense managed to force a punt, but the Colts turned the ball over on downs again after Dallas Clark's fourth-down drop with 53 seconds left, and San Diego ran out the rest of the clock to close the RCA Dome for good.

This was the second postseason meeting between the Chargers and Colts, with Indianapolis winning the only prior meeting 35–20 in the 1995 AFC Wild Card playoffs. -->

==== NFC: New York Giants 21, Dallas Cowboys 17 ====
New York Giants vs. Dallas Cowboys – Game summary

Quarter	1	2	3	4	Total
Giants	7	7	0	7	21
Cowboys	0	14	3	0	17

at Texas Stadium, Irving, Texas

- Game time: 4:30 p.m. EST/3:30 p.m. CST
- Game weather: 59 °F (15 °C), clear skies
- Game attendance: 63,660
- Referee: Pete Morelli
- TV announcers (Fox): Joe Buck (play-by-play), Troy Aikman (color commentator), Pam Oliver, and Chris Myers (sideline reporters)

Game information

First quarter

- NYG – Amani Toomer 52-yard pass from Eli Manning (Lawrence Tynes kick), 11:50. Giants 7–0. Drive: 6 plays, 77 yards, 3:10.

Second quarter

- DAL – Terrell Owens 5-yard pass from Tony Romo (Nick Folk kick), 14:56. Tied 7–7. Drive: 9 plays, 96 yards, 4:57.
- DAL – Marion Barber 1-yard run (Nick Folk kick), 0:53. Cowboys 14–7. Drive: 20 plays, 90 yards, 10:28.
- NYG – Amani Toomer 4-yard pass from Eli Manning (Lawrence Tynes kick), 0:07. Tied 14–14. Drive: 7 plays, 71 yards, 0:46.

Third quarter

- DAL – Nick Folk 34-yard field goal, 6:53. Cowboys 17–14. Drive: 14 plays, 62 yards, 8:07.

Fourth quarter

- NYG – Brandon Jacobs 1-yard run (Lawrence Tynes kick), 13:29. Giants 21–17. Drive: 6 plays, 37 yards, 2:24.

Top passers

- NYG – Eli Manning – 12/18, 163 yards, 2 TD
- DAL – Tony Romo – 18/36, 201 yards, TD, INT

Top rushers

- NYG – Brandon Jacobs – 14 rushes, 54 yards, TD
- DAL – Marion Barber – 27 rushes, 129 yards, TD

Top receivers

- NYG – Amani Toomer – 4 receptions, 80 yards, 2 TD
- DAL – Jason Witten – 7 receptions, 81 yards

With nine seconds left in the game, Giants cornerback R. W. McQuarters intercepted a Tony Romo pass in the end zone to preserve a victory over the Cowboys, who had defeated New York twice during the season. The win marked the first time in 20 years that the NFC's #1 seeded team had been eliminated in the divisional round, the first time it had happened since the current playoff format was instituted in 1990, and sent the Cowboys home with their sixth consecutive playoff loss since 1996. The Giants advanced to their first NFC Championship Game since 2000 with the win and won their ninth consecutive game away from Giants Stadium. This would also turn out to be the final playoff game at Texas Stadium.

The Giants scored on their opening drive when Eli Manning threw a pass to Amani Toomer, who caught the pass on a curl route at the Dallas 39 before spinning away from the defense and running down left sideline for a 52-yard touchdown reception. Following an exchange of punts, Dallas running back Marion Barber rushed twice for 56 yards on a 9-play, 95-yard drive that ended with Romo's 5-yard touchdown pass to Terrell Owens. Then after a punt, Dallas scored on one of the longest drives in playoff history, moving the ball 90 yards in 20 plays and taking 10:28 off the clock. Barber capped the drive with a 1-yard touchdown run to give Dallas a 14–7 lead with 53 seconds left in the second quarter. The Giants responded by scoring a second touchdown, going 74 yards in 46 seconds. Ahmad Bradshaw ran for 13 yards, Manning completed two passes to Steve Smith for 34 yards, and a facemask penalty added another 15 yards. Following a 19-yard reception by tight end Kevin Boss, Manning threw a 4-yard touchdown pass to Toomer to tie the game with seven seconds remaining in the half.

Dallas took the second half kickoff and retook the lead with a 62-yard drive that ended with a field goal by Nick Folk. The rest of the quarter was scoreless, but with 53 seconds left, McQuarters' 25-yard punt return gave New York the ball on the Cowboys 37-yard line. Five plays later, Brandon Jacobs scored a 1-yard touchdown run, giving the Giants a 21–17 lead. After an exchange of punts, Dallas got the ball on their own 44-yard line with seven minutes left in the game. But following several penalties, the Cowboys could only move the ball to their 49 and had to punt. Their defense managed to force New York to punt again after only three plays and Patrick Crayton returned it eight yards, giving them a first down with 1:50 left to play, one timeout, and the ball on the New York 48-yard line. Romo threw a 9-yard pass to Barber and an 18-yard completion to Jason Witten at the 27-yard line. The Cowboys, however, only managed to gain four more yards and on fourth down Romo threw an interception to McQuarters in the end zone to clinch the victory for the Giants, who ran out the clock from there.

This was the first postseason meeting between the Giants and Cowboys.

== Conference championships ==
=== Sunday, January 20, 2008 ===
==== AFC: New England Patriots 21, San Diego Chargers 12 ====
San Diego Chargers vs. New England Patriots – Game summary

Quarter	1	2	3	4	Total
Chargers	3	6	3	0	12
Patriots	0	14	0	7	21

at Gillette Stadium, Foxborough, Massachusetts

- Game time: 3:00 p.m. EST
- Game weather: 23 °F (−5 °C), partly cloudy, windy and cold
- Game attendance: 68,756
- Referee: Jeff Triplette
- TV announcers (CBS): Jim Nantz (play-by-play), Phil Simms (color commentator), and Steve Tasker (sideline reporter)

Game information

First quarter

- SD – Nate Kaeding 26-yard field goal, 2:55. Chargers 3–0. Drive: 7 plays, 32 yards, 2:12.

Second quarter

- NE – Laurence Maroney 1-yard run (Stephen Gostkowski kick), 13:48. Patriots 7–3. Drive: 10 plays, 65 yards, 4:07.
- SD – Nate Kaeding 23-yard field goal, 9:14. Patriots 7–6. Drive: 9 plays, 65 yards, 4:34.
- NE – Jabar Gaffney 12-yard pass from Tom Brady (Stephen Gostkowski kick), 3:51. Patriots 14–6. Drive: 2 plays, 24 yards, 0:45.
- SD – Nate Kaeding 40-yard field goal, 0:08. Patriots 14–9. Drive: 6 plays, 43 yards, 1:38.

Third quarter

- SD – Nate Kaeding 24-yard field goal, 8:36. Patriots 14–12. Drive: 8 plays, 43 yards, 3:56.

Fourth quarter

- NE – Wes Welker 6-yard pass from Tom Brady (Stephen Gostkowski kick), 12:15. Patriots 21–12. Drive: 8 plays, 67 yards, 4:17.

Top passers

- SD – Philip Rivers – 19/37, 211 yards, 2 INT
- NE – Tom Brady – 22/33, 209 yards, 2 TD, 3 INT

Top rushers

- SD – Michael Turner – 17 rushes, 65 yards
- NE – Laurence Maroney – 25 rushes, 122 yards, TD

Top receivers

- SD – Vincent Jackson – 6 receptions, 93 yards
- NE – Kevin Faulk – 8 receptions, 82 yards

Despite three interceptions from Tom Brady, the Patriots still managed to defeat San Diego, holding them to four field goals while Laurence Maroney rushed for 122 yards and a touchdown for the second game in a row. With this win, the Patriots became the first NFL team to start with an 18–0 record and advanced to their fourth Super Bowl appearance in seven years.

With just over five minutes left in the first quarter, Chargers corner Quentin Jammer intercepted a pass from Brady on the Patriots 40-yard line, setting up a 26-yard field goal by Nate Kaeding. New England responded by driving 65 yards and scoring with a 1-yard Maroney touchdown run to take a 7–3 lead.

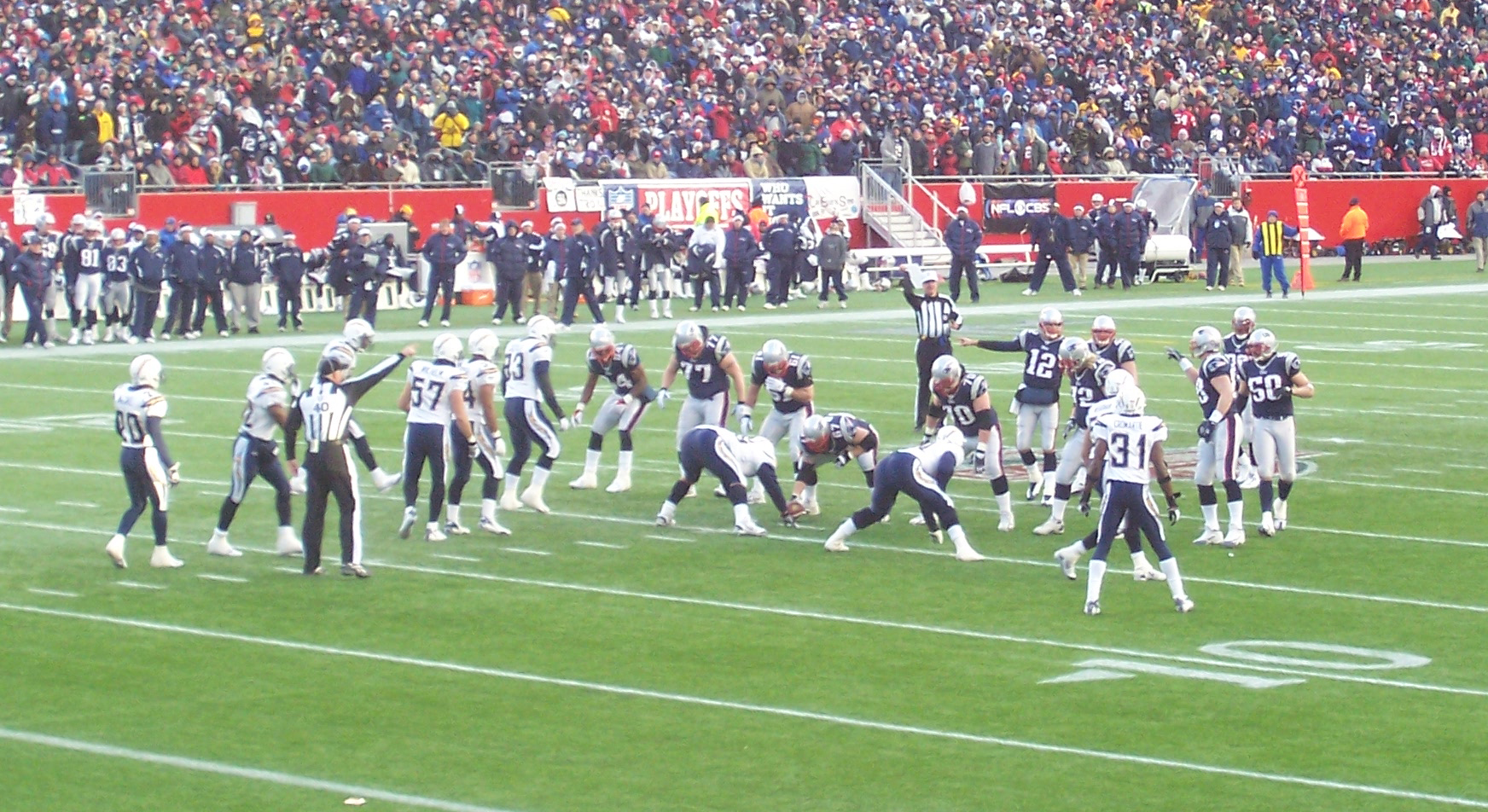
New England takes on San Diego in the AFC Championship Game

Kaeding kicked a 23-yard field goal in the second quarter to cut the score to 7–6, but after a punt, Asante Samuel intercepted a pass from Philip Rivers and returned it 10 yards to the Chargers 24-yard line. One play later, Brady's 12-yard touchdown pass to Jabar Gaffney increased their lead to 14–6. Later on, a 26-yard run by Darren Sproles moved the ball to the New England 34-yard line. But once again, the Patriots defense kept San Diego out of the end zone, stopping them on third and 1 and forcing them to settle for another Kaeding field goal, making the score 14–9 at halftime.

On the opening drive of the second half, Brady threw his second interception of the game, this one to Drayton Florence at the New England 49-yard line. San Diego then moved the ball to the 4-yard line, but on third and 1, linebacker Junior Seau tackled Michael Turner for a 2-yard loss and the Chargers had to settle for Kaeding's fourth field goal. New England responded with a drive to the San Diego 2-yard line, with Maroney gaining 39 yards on four running plays, but Chargers cornerback Antonio Cromartie ended the drive by intercepting Brady in the end zone.

On their first drive of the fourth quarter, New England moved the ball 67 yards and scored with Brady's 6-yard touchdown pass to Wes Welker, making the score 21–12. Following a Chargers punt, the Patriots ended the game with a 15-play drive that took the final 9:13 off the game clock.

This was the third postseason meeting (and second consecutive) between the Chargers and Patriots. Both teams have split the prior two meetings. New England won last season's postseason meeting 24–21 in the 2006 AFC Divisional playoffs.

==== NFC: New York Giants 23, Green Bay Packers 20 (OT) ====
New York Giants vs. Green Bay Packers – Game summary

Quarter	1	2	3	4	OT	Total
Giants	3	3	14	0	3	23
Packers	0	10	7	3	0	20

at Lambeau Field, Green Bay, Wisconsin

- Game time: 6:30 p.m. EST/5:30 p.m. CST
- Game weather: −1 °F (−18 °C), clear
- Game attendance: 72,740
- Referee: Terry McAulay
- TV announcers (Fox): Joe Buck (play-by-play), Troy Aikman (color commentator), Pam Oliver, and Chris Myers (sideline reporters)

Game information

First quarter

- NYG – Lawrence Tynes 29-yard field goal, 4:50. Giants 3–0. Drive: 14 plays, 71 yards, 7:48.

Second quarter

- NYG – Lawrence Tynes 37-yard field goal, 11:41. Giants 6–0. Drive: 7 plays, 38 yards, 3:04.
- GB – Donald Driver 90-yard pass from Brett Favre (Mason Crosby kick), 11:18. Packers 7–6. Drive: 1 plays, 90 yards, 0:23.
- GB – Mason Crosby 36-yard field goal, 1:30. Packers 10–6. Drive: 8 plays, 29 yards, 2:58.

Third quarter

- NYG – Brandon Jacobs 1-yard run, 7:56. Giants 13–10. Drive: 12 plays, 69 yards, 7:04.
- GB – Donald Lee 12-yard pass from Brett Favre (Mason Crosby kick), 5:00. Packers 17–13. Drive: 6 plays, 39 yards, 2:56.
- NYG – Ahmad Bradshaw 4-yard run, 2:12. Giants 20–17. Drive: 7 plays, 57 yards, 2:48.

Fourth quarter

- GB – Mason Crosby 37-yard field goal, 11:46. Tied 20–20. Drive: 4 plays, 0 yards, 2:14.

Overtime

- NYG – Lawrence Tynes 47-yard field goal, 12:25. Giants 23–20. Drive: 4 plays, 5 yards, 1:39.

Top passers

- NYG – Eli Manning – 21/40, 251 yards
- GB – Brett Favre – 19/35, 236 yards, 2 TD, 2 INT

Top rushers

- NYG – Brandon Jacobs – 21 rushes, 67 yards, TD
- GB – Ryan Grant – 13 rushes, 29 yards

Top receivers

- NYG – Plaxico Burress – 11 receptions, 151 yards
- GB – Donald Driver – 5 receptions, 141 yards, TD

Seventeen years to the day after their win over the 49ers in the 1990 NFC Championship Game, the Giants won the 2007 NFC Championship Game. And seventeen years to the day that Matt Bahr kicked the winning field goal to send the Giants to the Super Bowl, Giants kicker Lawrence Tynes did exactly the same thing. New York won its fourth NFC Championship Game in as many tries, and won their tenth consecutive game away from home.

For the third playoff game in a row, Giants quarterback Eli Manning didn't throw a single interception, finishing the game with 254 yards. His top target was Plaxico Burress, who set a franchise postseason record with 11 receptions for 154 yards. Donald Driver was the Packers top receiver with five catches for 141 yards.

The game was played in frigid conditions, with a gametime temperature of −1 °F (−18 °C) and a wind chill of −23 °F (−31 °C). The Giants drove twice into Packers territory early, but were unable to score a touchdown on either drive and had to settle for two Tynes field goals. On the kickoff following the second field goal Packers return man Koren Robinson misplayed the ball and was forced to chase after it. Tramon Williams, the other returner on the play, recovered the ball at the Packers' 10-yard line. On the first play of the ensuing drive Brett Favre responded by hitting Donald Driver on a 90-yard touchdown pass, which was the longest play in Green Bay postseason history and gave them a 7–6 lead. The Packers extended the lead to 10–6 on a second quarter Mason Crosby field goal and kept that lead into the half.

The Giants got the ball to start the second half and drove the ball 69 yards for a score, a one-yard run into the end zone by Brandon Jacobs. On the play prior to the touchdown Jacobs fumbled the ball at the one-yard line but tight end Kevin Boss of the Giants recovered. The Packers committed four penalties on the drive, one negating an Al Harris interception and another a roughing the passer penalty on a failed third down conversion.

Williams' 49-yard return on the ensuing kickoff put the Packers in New York territory to start their response. The Giants appeared to stop the Packers drive after Driver caught a pass short of the first down, but Sam Madison was called for a personal foul which gave Green Bay a first down at the Giants' 12-yard line. On the next play Favre hit Donald Lee for a touchdown to retake the lead.

Almost as quickly as the Packers scored, the Giants answered right back as Manning was given the ball at his own 43-yard line thanks to a short kick from Crosby and a 33-yard return from Domenik Hixon. Seven plays later, the Giants re-took the lead as Ahmad Bradshaw scored from four yards away.

Once again, however, Favre and the Packers went down the field and into Giants territory, reaching the 31-yard line. On the second play of the fourth quarter, however, Favre threw a pass that R. W. McQuarters of the Giants intercepted and attempted to return. As he did so, Ryan Grant stripped the ball from McQuarters and it fell into the arms of Packers right tackle Mark Tauscher. The sequence netted the Packers 12 yards, as Tauscher's recovery gave Green Bay the ball at the New York 19-yard line and a fresh set of downs.

However, Green Bay did not gain a yard in three plays and Crosby was called on to kick a game-tying field goal, which he converted. The Giants then attempted to drive down the field and score on their third consecutive drive, and got into position for a go-ahead field goal. Tynes, however, missed from 43 yards and the game remained tied at 20.

Neither the Packers nor the Giants had any success moving the ball on their next series, resulting in the Packers punting twice and the Giants once. On the second Green Bay punt McQuarters fumbled for the second time in the game. This time, the Giants were able to recover as Hixon fell on the ball after a scrum. With 2:15 remaining and the ball at the Packers' 48, Bradshaw took a hand-off from Manning on the first play of the drive and ran all the way for the apparent go-ahead touchdown, but Chris Snee was called for holding which nullified the play. Despite the penalty the Giants continued to drive, and with the ball at the Green Bay 18-yard line Tynes was called on again for a field goal with four seconds remaining. Once again, however, he did not make the kick, instead hooking the 36-yarder wide left and forcing overtime.

Green Bay won the coin toss to start the extra period, but on the second play of overtime Favre's pass, which would be his last as a Packer, was intercepted by Corey Webster, who returned the ball nine yards to the Green Bay 34-yard line. The Giants gained five yards on three plays and then sent Tynes out to try his fifth field goal of the game, and his longest attempt of the day (47 yards). Just as Bahr had done seventeen years prior to the day, Tynes connected on the game-winning field goal, clinching a fourth NFC Championship for the Giants and their first since 2000. The Giants, the NFC's #5 seed, became just the second NFC wild card team ever to win a conference championship (the 1975 Dallas Cowboys being the other) and the third team ever (and first NFC team) to reach the Super Bowl with three road playoff wins (joining the 1985 New England Patriots and the 2005 Pittsburgh Steelers. The Green Bay Packers matched the feat three years later).

The game was the third ever conference championship game to be decided in overtime since the AFL/NFL merger, joining the 1986 AFC Championship Game and the 1998 NFC Championship Game. Tynes joined Rich Karlis and Morten Andersen as the only players to score the decisive points in an overtime conference championship game (coincidentally, all three players were members of the respective visiting teams in those years). Since, four more NFC Championship Games have gone to overtime, with the 2009 NFC Championship Game and the 2011 NFC Championship Game won by the Saints and Giants (Tynes would again kick the game-winning field goal in the 2011 game). Tynes also set a record for longest field goal by an opposing player in Lambeau Field playoff history with his game-winning kick. The first NFC Championship Game ending in overtime on a touchdown was the 2014 NFC Championship Game, won by the Seattle Seahawks. The 2018 NFC Championship Game also went into overtime, which was won by the Los Angeles Rams on a game-winning field goal.

The Packers' loss was their third in the last five Lambeau Field playoff games and marked the first time that they had ever lost an NFL/NFC Championship Game at home (losing three previous games at the Polo Grounds, Franklin Field, and Texas Stadium).

This was the last time the Packers hosted the NFC Championship game until the 2020 season.

The game was featured as one of the NFL's Greatest Games as The Chilling Championship.

This was the sixth postseason meeting between the Giants and Packers, with Green Bay winning four of the prior five games. The most recent meeting was won by Green Bay in the 1962 NFL Championship Game.

== Super Bowl XLII: New York Giants 17, New England Patriots 14 ==
Super Bowl XLII – New York Giants vs. New England Patriots – Game summary

Quarter	1	2	3	4	Total
Giants (NFC)	3	0	0	14	17
Patriots (AFC)	0	7	0	7	14

at University of Phoenix Stadium, Glendale, Arizona

- Date: February 3, 2008
- Game time: 6:30 p.m. EST (4:30 p.m. MST)
- Game weather: Played with roof closed, retractable roof stadium
- Game attendance: 71,101
- Referee: Mike Carey
- TV announcers (Fox): Joe Buck (play-by-play) and Troy Aikman (color commentator)
- Recap

Game information

First quarter

- NYG – Lawrence Tynes 32-yard field goal, 5:01. Giants 3–0. Drive: 16 plays, 63 yards, 9:59.

Second quarter

- NE – Laurence Maroney 1-yard run (Stephen Gostkowski kick), 14:57. Patriots 7–3. Drive: 12 plays, 56 yards, 5:04.

Third quarter

- None.

Fourth quarter

- NYG – David Tyree 5-yard pass from Eli Manning (Lawrence Tynes kick), 11:05. Giants 10–7. Drive: 6 plays, 80 yards, 3:47.
- NE – Randy Moss 6-yard pass from Tom Brady (Stephen Gostkowski kick), 2:42. Patriots 14–10. Drive: 12 plays, 80 yards, 5:12.
- NYG – Plaxico Burress 13-yard pass from Eli Manning (Lawrence Tynes kick), 0:35. Giants 17–14. Drive: 12 plays, 83 yards, 2:07.

Top passers

- NYG – Eli Manning – 19/34, 255 yards, 2 TD, INT
- NE – Tom Brady – 29/48, 266 yards, TD

Top rushers

- NYG – Ahmad Bradshaw – 9 rushes, 45 yards
- NE – Laurence Maroney – 14 rushes, 36 yards, TD

Top receivers

- NYG – Amani Toomer – 6 receptions, 84 yards
- NE – Wes Welker – 11 receptions, 103 yards

This was the first Super Bowl meeting between the Giants and Patriots.

== Sources ==
- "Seahawks stymie Redskins' rally, win 35–14 in NFC playoffs". Associated Press. January 5, 2008.
- "NFL Gamebook – WAS @ SEA" (PDF). NFL.com. January 5, 2008.
- "Jaguars collapse in fourth, but rally to beat Steelers". Associated Press. January 5, 2008.
- "NFL Gamebook – JAC @ PIT" (PDF). NFL.com. January 5, 2008.
- "Giants march on after beating host Buccaneers". Associated Press. January 6, 2008.
- "NFL Gamebook – NYG @ TB" (PDF). NFL.com. January 6, 2008.
- "Second-half rally sends Chargers into AFC Divisional date with Colts". Associated Press. January 6, 2008.
- "NFL Gamebook – TEN @ SD" (PDF). NFL.com. January 6, 2008.
- "Grant, Favre rally Packers to cement spot in NFC Championship". Associated Press. January 12, 2008.
- "NFL Gamebook – SEA @ GB" (PDF). NFL.com. January 12, 2008.
- "Brady almost perfect as Pats top Jags to advance to AFC championship". Associated Press. January 12, 2008.
- "NFL Gamebook – JAC @ NE" (PDF). NFL.com. January 12, 2008.
- "Lightning strikes again, Bolts knock off defending champs". Associated Press. January 13, 2008.
- "NFL Gamebook – SD @ IND" (PDF). NFL.com. January 13, 2008.
- "Giants upset Cowboys to advance to NFC Championship game". Associated Press. January 13, 2008.
- "NFL Gamebook – NYG @ DAL" (PDF). NFL.com. January 13, 2008.
- "Patriots knock off hobbled Chargers, advance to Super Bowl". Associated Press. January 20, 2008.
- "NFL Gamebook – SD @ NE" (PDF). NFL.com. January 20, 2008.
- "Third Tynes a charm: Kicker boots Giants into Super Bowl". Associated Press. January 20, 2008.
- "NFL Gamebook – NYG @ GB" (PDF). NFL.com. January 20, 2008.
