= Scott Dreisbach =

American football player (born 1975)

No. 12
- Position: Quarterback

Personal information
- Born: December 16, 1975 (age 50); South Bend, Indiana, U.S.
- Listed height: 6 ft 3 in (1.91 m)
- Listed weight: 210 lb (95 kg)

Career information
- High school: Penn (Mishawaka, Indiana)
- College: Michigan (1994–1998)
- NFL draft: 1999: undrafted

Career history
- Oakland Raiders (1999–2000); Buffalo Bills (2001)*; Detroit Lions (2001); → Scottish Claymores (2002); Los Angeles Avengers (2003); Dallas Desperados (2004); Austin Wranglers (2005); Georgia Force (2006); Columbus Destroyers (2007)
- * Offseason or practice squad member only

Awards and highlights
- AP national champion (1997)

Career AFL statistics
- Comp. / Att.: 89 / 146
- Passing yards: 976
- TD–INT: 16–7
- Passer rating: 88.16
- Rushing touchdowns: 2
- Stats at ArenaFan.com

Scott Thomas Dreisbach Jr. (born December 16, 1975) is an American former professional football player who was a quarterback in the National Football League (NFL). He played college football for the Michigan Wolverines.

Originally from Mishawaka, Indiana, Dreisbach played college football as a quarterback at the University of Michigan from 1995 to 1998. He began the 1995 and 1996 seasons as Michigan's starting quarterback, but had both seasons cut short by injury. In 15 games as a starter, Dreisbach led the Wolverines to a 12–3 record and completed 205 of 375 passes for 2,875 yards and 15 touchdowns. He is best remembered leading Michigan to last-second, come-from-behind victory in his first game as a Wolverine, the 1995 Pigskin Classic.

Dreisbach played professional football for the Oakland Raiders from 1999 to 2000, but he was injured prior to the start of the regular season each year. He was the starting quarterback for the Scottish Claymores during the 2002 NFL Europe season and later played five seasons in the Arena Football League (AFL) for the Los Angeles Avengers (2003), Dallas Desperados (2004), Austin Wranglers (2005), Georgia Force (2006) and Columbus Destroyers (2007).

== Early life ==
Dreisbach was born in South Bend, Indiana, in 1975. He played quarterback at Penn High School in Mishawaka, Indiana. He is the grandson of Edwin "Bulbs" Ehlers and the nephew of Tom Ehlers.

== College career ==
Dreisbach enrolled at the University of Michigan in 1994 and played college football as a quarterback for head coach Lloyd Carr's Michigan Wolverines football teams from 1995 to 1998.

=== 1995 season ===
After redshirting in 1994, Dreisbach began the 1995 season as Michigan's starting quarterback. He is best remembered for his performance in his first game as a Wolverine, the 1995 Pigskin Classic against Virginia. In Lloyd Carr's debut as Michigan head coach, the Wolverines trailed 17–0 at home in the fourth quarter before the redshirt freshman Dreisbach engineered three scoring drives, the last culminating with a touchdown pass to Mercury Hayes as time expired for an 18–17 Michigan victory. Dreisbach set Michigan records for pass attempts (52) and passing yards (372) in the game; both marks have since been broken.

Dreisbach led Michigan to a 4–0 record in the first four games of the 1995 season, but he suffered a serious injury to his right thumb and wrist after a collision with a teammate during practice. During the final eight games of the season, the Wolverines went 5–4 with Brian Griese at quarterback. Due to the nature and severity of the injury, Dreisbach required two surgeries on his hand.

=== 1996 season ===
In 1996, Dreisbach rebounded from his injury to beat out Brian Griese and sophomore Tom Brady as the Wolverines' starting quarterback. Dreisbach served as Michigan's starting quarterback for the first 11 games of the 1996 season, leading the team to an 8–3 record in those games. After tying a Michigan record with four touchdown passes in a 45–29 victory over Michigan State, he was selected as Michigan's Athlete of the Week. In 11 games during the 1996 season, Dreisbach completed 149 of 269 passes (55.4% completion percentage) for 2,025 yards, 12 touchdowns and nine interceptions.

In 12 games as a starter during the 1995 and 1996 seasons, Dreisbach led the Wolverines to a 12–4 record and completed 205 of 375 passes for 2,875 yards, 15 touchdowns and 12 interceptions.

=== Backup in 1997 and 1998 ===
Dreisbach entered the 1997 season in competition with Griese for the starting quarterback job, but was limited by injuries suffered before the start of the season. As a result, Griese won the job and quarterbacked the 1997 Wolverines to a national championship. Dreisbach entered his senior season in 1998 as a candidate to start, but lost the starting job to redshirt junior Tom Brady and the backup job to heralded true freshman Drew Henson. Dreisbach saw limited action in 1997 and 1998, completing three of five passes in his final two seasons.

== Professional football ==
Pre-draft measurables
Height	Weight	Arm length	Hand span	40-yard dash	10-yard split	20-yard split	20-yard shuttle	Three-cone drill	Vertical jump	Broad jump	Wonderlic
6 ft 3 in (1.91 m)	216 lb (98 kg)	30 in (0.76 m)	9 3/4 in (0.25 m)	4.76 s	1.63 s	2.74 s	4.27 s	7.06 s	33.0 in (0.84 m)	9 ft 4 in (2.84 m)	20
All values from NFL Combine

=== Oakland Raiders ===
Despite not starting a game during his junior and senior seasons, Dreisbach was signed by the Oakland Raiders as an undrafted free agent. He led the Raider to consecutive victories during the 1999 preseason, but he broke his leg on a tackle with less than two minutes remaining in a preseason game as he scrambled to the Dallas Cowboys' five-yard line. Dreisbach said he heard the leg crack when he was hit, and fullback Jon Ritchie said he "almost puked" when he saw the injury to Dreisbach. Despite the injury, the Raiders kept Dreisbach on the active roster during the 1999 NFL season so he could still attend all team meetings and work with the coaching staff during his recovery. He entered the Raiders' 2000 training camp competing with Rodney Peete for the #3 quarterback behind Rich Gannon and Bobby Hoying. He ended up on the injured reserve list with a torn rotator cuff in his right shoulder and was released by the Raiders in April 2001.

=== Bills and Lions ===
In November 2001, Dreisbach was signed by the Buffalo Bills for the team's practice squad. In December 2001, after an injury to Charlie Batch, he was signed by the Detroit Lions. However, Mike McMahon started the remaining games for the Lions, and Dreisbach again saw no regular season action in the NFL.

=== NFL Europe ===
The Lions allocated Dreisbach to the Scottish Claymores in 2002. During the 2002 NFL Europe season, Dreisbach started nine games for the Claymores and passed for 1,154 yards and nine touchdowns. He was then released by the Lions in August 2002.

=== Arena Football League ===
Dreisbach next played in the Arena Football League (AFL) for the Los Angeles Avengers in 2003, the Dallas Desperados in 2004, the Austin Wranglers in 2005, the Georgia Force in 2006 and the Columbus Destroyers in 2007. In five AFL seasons, Dreisbach completed 89 of 146 passes for 976 yards, 16 touchdowns and seven interceptions.

== Later life ==
After his playing career, Dreisbach became a teacher and coach at Stephen F. Austin High School in Austin, Texas. He lives in Austin with his wife Mecca, and their son, Davis. In 2014, he joined his grandfather and uncle in the Indiana Football Hall of Fame; he was inducted in recognition of his high school, college and professional careers.

== See also ==
- Lists of Michigan Wolverines football passing leaders
