= Going Deep with Amani and Dan =

NBC sports radio program

Going Deep With Amani and Dan
- Genre: Sports
- Running time: 3 hours
- Hosted by: Amani Toomer and Dan Schwartzman
- Produced by: Shaun Guastamacchia
- Website: http://www.nbcsportsradio.com

Going Deep With Amani and Dan was a sports radio program hosted by Amani Toomer and Dan Schwartzman, broadcast on NBC Sports Radio weeknights from 10pm to 1am ET. A successor program to Going Deep with Amani and Eytan with previous co-host Eytan Sander, the program premiered on July 14, 2014.

The show, by this point only carrying Schwartzman as host, was canceled along with most of the rest of the network's programming at the end of 2018 as NBC Sports Radio ended operations as a full-time network.
