= Amani Toomer =

American football player (born 1974)

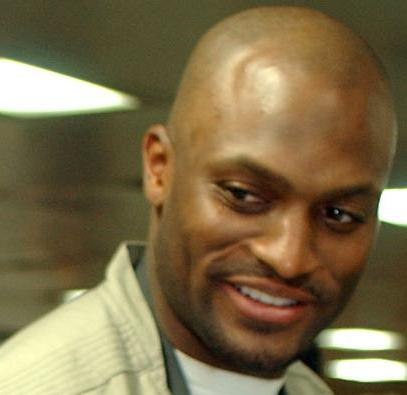
- Toomer in 2005

No. 89, 81
- Position: Wide receiver

Personal information
- Born: September 8, 1974 (age 52); Berkeley, California, U.S.
- Listed height: 6 ft 3 in (1.91 m)
- Listed weight: 203 lb (92 kg)

Career information
- High school: De La Salle (Concord, California)
- College: Michigan (1992–1995)
- NFL draft: 1996: 2nd round, 34th overall pick

Career history
- New York Giants (1996–2008); Kansas City Chiefs (2009)*
- * Offseason or practice squad member only

Awards and highlights
- Super Bowl champion (XLII); New York Giants Ring of Honor; 16th greatest New York Giant of all-time; First-team All-Big Ten (1994); Second-team All-Big Ten (1995)

Career NFL statistics
- Receptions: 668
- Receiving yards: 9,497
- Receiving touchdowns: 54
- Return yards: 1,317
- Return touchdowns: 3
- Stats at Pro Football Reference

Amani Askari Toomer (born September 8, 1974) is an American former professional football player who spent his entire career as a wide receiver and punt returner for the New York Giants of the National Football League (NFL). He registered over 1,000 receiving yards each season from 1999 to 2003, was a member of the 2007 Giants team that won Super Bowl XLII, and holds Giants' club records with 9,497 receiving yards, 668 receptions, and 54 receiving touchdowns. He also returned 109 punts for 1,060 yards and three touchdowns. As a rookie in 1996, he led the NFL with an average of 16.6 yards on 18 punt returns.

Toomer played college football for the Michigan Wolverines from 1992 to 1995. In 1994, he broke the school's single-season record with 1,096 receiving yards and was a finalist for the Biletnikoff Award and a first-team All-Big Ten honoree. Toomer finished his college career ranked second (now fourth) in Michigan history with 2,657 receiving yards.

== Early life ==
Toomer was born in Berkeley, California, in 1974. His first name, "Amani", is Swahili for peace, and his middle name, "Askari", is Swahili for soldier. Toomer's father, Donald Toomer, played college football for Woody Hayes at Ohio State. His uncle is comedian George Wallace. Toomer began playing Pee-Wee Football as a lineman for the Berkeley Cougars and as a receiver, kicker, punter, linebacker, and running back for the Richmond Steelers.

Toomer attended De La Salle High School in Concord, California. As a football player at De La Salle, Toomer was selected as a Parade All-American and a USA Today All-USA player.

== College career ==
Toomer enrolled at the University of Michigan in 1992 and played college football for the Michigan Wolverines football team from 1992 to 1995. As a freshman and sophomore in 1992 and 1993, he started only three games (two in 1992 and one in 1993) and was principally used as a backup to the team's #1 receiver, Derrick Alexander. Toomer caught 16 passes for 238 yards in 1992 and 29 passes for 565 yards in 1993.

=== 1994 season ===
As a junior in 1994, Toomer did not start any games for Michigan, as Mercury Hayes was the starting flanker in all 12 games. Despite technically being a "backup" to Hayes, Toomer in 1994 broke Jack Clancy's single-season Michigan record with 1,096 receiving yards. With Todd Collins at quarterback, Toomer was the 1994 Wolverines' leading receiver with 54 receptions for 1,096 yards, an average of 20.3 yards per reception. Toomer also finished the season as the Big Ten Conference's leading receiver with an average of 93.9 receiving yards per game. He had a career-high 179 receiving yards, including touchdown receptions of 46 and 38 yards, in the Wolverines' 1994 season-opening victory over Boston College. He also returned a punt 72 yards for a touchdown against Illinois. Toomer was a finalist for the Biletnikoff Award in 1994 and was selected by both the conference coaches and media as a first-team wide receiver on the 1994 All-Big Ten team.

=== 1995 season ===
As a senior, Toomer finally became a starter, starting 12 games at split end for the 1995 Michigan team. However, Toomer was routinely double-teamed in 1995, opening the way for Mercury Hayes to lead the team in both receptions and receiving yardage. Toomer finished the 1995 season with 44 receptions for 758 yards and seven touchdowns. He had his best game of the season in a 52–17 victory over Minnesota, catching five passes for 174 yards and two touchdowns, including a career-long 75-yard touchdown reception from Brian Griese.

=== College career overview ===
In four seasons at Michigan, Toomer had 124 receptions for 2,144 yards (17.3 per catch) and 12 receiving touchdowns. He finished his college career ranked second (now fourth) in Michigan history with 2,657 receiving yards. Toomer was also used as a punt and kick returner at Michigan. He returned 46 punts for 384 yards (8.3 yards per return) and two touchdowns. He also returned 14 kickoffs for 306 yards (21.9 yards per return).

== Professional career ==
Pre-draft measurables
Height	Weight	Arm length	Hand span	40-yard dash	10-yard split	20-yard split	20-yard shuttle	Vertical jump
6 ft 2 7/8 in (1.90 m)	197 lb (89 kg)	32 1/2 in (0.83 m)	9 in (0.23 m)	4.50 s	1.58 s	2.65 s	4.14 s	40.0 in (1.02 m)
All values from NFL Combine

=== Return specialist: 1996–1998 ===
Toomer was selected by the New York Giants in the second round (34th overall pick) of the 1996 NFL draft. In July 1996, he signed a three-year contract with the Giants providing a $670,000 signing bonus and salaries of $269,000 in 1996, $336,000 in 1997, and $403,000 in 1998.

In his first three seasons with the Giants, Toomer was principally used as a punt and kickoff returner. In his first NFL game, the opening game of the 1996 season, Toomer set a Giants' record with an 87-yard punt return for a touchdown against the Buffalo Bills. He returned a second punt for a touchdown that season against the Philadelphia Eagles, before injuring his anterior cruciate ligament (ACL) and spending the rest of the season on injured reserve. Toomer led the NFL in 1996 with an average of 16.1 yards on 19 punt returns.

During the 1997 season, Toomer appeared in all 16 games for the Giants and returned 47 punts for 455 yards, an average of 9.7 yards per return. He registered his third punt return touchdown. He also caught his first touchdown pass on November 16, 1997, a 56-yard reception from Danny Kanell against the Arizona Cardinals.

In 1998, Toomer again appeared in all 16 games for the Giants. He returned 35 punts for 252 yards, an average of 7.1 yards per return. He also began to see increased playing time as a receiver, registering 27 catches for 360 yards and five touchdowns. In Week 15, in a come-from-behind victory over the previously undefeated Denver Broncos, Toomer caught a 37-yard touchdown pass from Kent Graham with 48 seconds left in the game as the Giants ruined the Broncos' dream of a perfect season by winning 20–16. Toomer later publicly acknowledged that his slow start as an NFL receiver was the result of exercise-induced asthma which he had hidden for years. After seeking treatment for the condition, his receiving career blossomed in 1999 and 2000.

=== Prime years: 1999–2003 ===
During the 1999 New York Giants season, Toomer became a starting wide receiver in all 16 games. That year, he broke the team record for receptions in a season (79), and his 1,183 receiving yards were the second-highest in team history behind Homer Jones.

In 2000, Toomer appeared in all 16 regular season games (14 as a starter) for the Giants and posted solid totals with 78 receptions for 1,094 yards and seven touchdowns. With Kerry Collins at quarterback, the 2000 Giants team advanced to Super Bowl XXXV (a loss to the Baltimore Ravens), and Toomer started all three postseason games for the team. He totaled 10 catches for 135 yards and a touchdown in the 2000–01 NFL playoffs.

During the 2001 New York Giants season, Toomer appeared in all 16 regular season games, caught more than 70 passes, and gained over 1,000 receiving yards for the third consecutive year.

Toomer had the best year of his NFL career in 2002. He set Giants' single-season records with 82 receptions and 1,343 receiving yards. His eight receiving touchdowns in 2002 were also a career-high. His total of 204 receiving yards against the Indianapolis Colts was also the highest total for a Giants wide receiver in a 60-minute game (two players had higher receiving totals, but both of those games went to overtime).

In 2003, Toomer started all 16 games and had his fifth consecutive season with at least 1,000 receiving yards. He totaled 63 catches for 1,057 yards and five touchdowns. In the second game of the season, a Monday night game against the Dallas Cowboys, Toomer broke Frank Gifford's club record for receiving yardage.

=== 2004–2006 ===
The 2004 season marked the first time since Toomer's rookie year in which he did not score a touchdown. Toomer appeared in 15 games and had 51 catches for 747 yards, the sixth consecutive season in which he topped 50 catches and 700 yards.

During the 2005 season, the Giants had a new starting quarterback, Eli Manning, who threw for almost 3,800 yards. Plaxico Burress took over as the Giants' #1 receiver, but Toomer still started all 16 games and had 60 receptions for 684 yards and seven touchdowns. Toomer's 2005 highlights included a last-second touchdown reception against the Denver Broncos, a late game-tying touchdown at Seattle, and a fourth-and-goal touchdown catch against the Rams.

Toomer started strongly in the 2006 season. In a Week 2 game against the Philadelphia Eagles, he tallied a career-high 12 receptions and scored two touchdowns to help spark a 17-point comeback. Physically exhausted by game's end, he had to be carried off the field by trainers. Toomer's season came to an end after eight games when he suffered a partially torn ACL in his left knee. In eight games during the 2006 season, Toomer had 32 receptions for 360 yards and three touchdowns. The Giants compiled a 6–2 record in the first half of the season with Toomer in the lineup, but fell to 2–6 in the second half without Toomer. Giants head coach Tom Coughlin noted, "There's no question Amani has a very positive effect on Eli." Quarterback Eli Manning also praised Toomer: "He has a way of being in the right place at the right time."

=== Super Bowl champion: 2007 ===
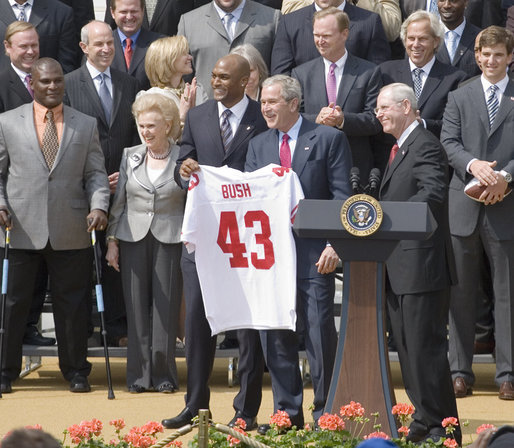
Amani presenting George W. Bush with a personalized Giants jersey on April 30, 2008.

During the 2007 season, Toomer returned from his injury to appear in all 16 regular season games for the Giants. He totaled 59 receptions for 760 yards and three touchdowns. On October 21, 2007, in a home game against the San Francisco 49ers, he broke Kyle Rote's club record with his 49th career touchdown catch. In the same game, he also broke Tiki Barber's team record for career receptions.

The 2007 Giants advanced through the playoffs and won Super Bowl XLII over the previously undefeated New England Patriots. Toomer started all four postseason games for the team and totaled 21 catches for 280 yards and three touchdowns. On January 13, 2008, during the 2007 divisional playoff round, Toomer caught a 52-yard touchdown pass, his longest since a 77-yard touchdown on November 30, 2003. This catch broke the club record for most postseason receptions. Toomer had two touchdown catches in the Giants' 21–17 upset over the Dallas Cowboys. His first touchdown gave the Giants a 7–0 lead after he caught an 11-yard pass, eluded three would be tacklers, and ran 50 yards for the score. Toomer also led the Giants with six receptions for 84 yards in the Super Bowl. In May 2008, Toomer and the Giants were invited by U.S President George W. Bush to the White House to honor their victory in Super Bowl XLII.

=== 2008 season and career overview ===
The 2008 season was Toomer's last in the NFL. He appeared in all 16 regular season games, 12 as a starter, and caught 48 passes for 580 yards and four touchdowns. He concluded his NFL career having appeared in 190 games, 142 as a starter, with 668 receptions for 9,497 yards (14.2 yards per catch), and 54 touchdown receptions. He holds Giants' record for most career receiving yards, receptions, receiving touchdowns, and most consecutive games with at least one reception (94). In 2010, Toomer was included in the initial group selected for induction into the New York Giants Ring of Honor.

==== Giants franchise records ====
As of 2017's NFL off-season, Amani Toomer held at least 16 Giants franchise records, including:

- Most Receptions (career): 668
- Most Receptions (game): 12 (2006-09-17 @PHI; tied with Mark Bavaro, Hakeem Nicks and Odell Beckham Jr. x2)
- Most Receptions (playoff career): 44
- Most Receiving Yds (career): 9,497
- Most Receiving Yds (playoff career): 608
- Most Receiving TDs (career): 54
- Most Receiving TDs (playoff career): 7
- Most Receiving TDs (playoff game): 3 (2003-01-05 @SFO)
- Most Total TDs (playoff career): 7
- Most Total TDs (playoff game): 3 (2003-01-05 @SFO)
- Most Punt Returns (season): 47 (1997; tied with Chad Morton)
- Most 100+ yard receiving games (career): 23
- Most Games with 1+ TD scored (playoffs): 4 (tied with Brandon Jacobs)
- Most Games with 2+ TD scored (playoffs): 2 (tied with Hakeem Nicks)
- Most Games with 3+ TD scored (playoffs): 1
- Most 1000+ receiving yards (career): 5

=== Kansas City Chiefs ===
Toomer was signed to a one-year contract by Kansas City Chiefs on August 4, 2009. He was released during final roster cuts on September 1.

== Personal life ==
In 2011, Toomer and fellow former New York Giant Roman Oben joined MSG Varsity's coverage of "Friday Night Football." In 2012, he joined NBC Sports Radio where he was a co-host with Dan Schwartzman of "Going Deep with Amani and Dan", a nighttime talk show on the network. Toomer lived in Weehawken, New Jersey.

In the summer of 2020, Toomer, along with his Danish wife Maj and their 3 children relocated to Ebeltoft, Denmark, because of the COVID-19 pandemic. During the 2020 NFL season he worked as an expert on TV3 Sport.

== NFL career statistics ==
Legend
	Won the Super Bowl
	Led the league
**Bold**	Career high

=== Regular season ===
Year	Team	Games		Receiving					Rushing					Returning				
Year	Team	GP	GS	Rec	Yds	Avg	Lng	TD	Att	Yds	Avg	Lng	TD	Ret	Yds	Avg	Lng	TD
1996	NYG	7	1	1	12	12.0	12	0	–	–	–	–	–	29	**489**	**16.9**	**87**	**2**
1997	NYG	**16**	0	16	263	16.4	56	1	–	–	–	–	–	**47**	455	9.7	53	1
1998	NYG	**16**	0	27	360	13.3	37	5	–	–	–	–	–	39	318	8.1	39	0
1999	NYG	**16**	**16**	79	1,183	15.0	80	6	1	4	4.0	4	0	1	14	14.0	14	0
2000	NYG	**16**	14	78	1,094	14.0	54	7	**5**	**91**	**18.2**	**28**	**1**	–	–	–	–	–
2001	NYG	**16**	14	72	1,054	14.6	60	5	3	8	2.7	9	0	8	41	5.1	15	0
2002	NYG	**16**	**16**	**82**	**1,343**	16.4	**82**	**8**	1	2	2.0	2	0	–	–	–	–	–
2003	NYG	**16**	**16**	63	1,057	**16.8**	77	5	1	5	5.0	5	0	–	–	–	–	–
2004	NYG	15	14	51	747	14.6	48	0	–	–	–	–	–	–	–	–	–	–
2005	NYG	**16**	15	60	684	11.4	37	7	–	–	–	–	–	–	–	–	–	–
2006	NYG	8	8	32	360	11.3	44	3	–	–	–	–	–	–	–	–	–	–
2007	NYG	**16**	15	59	760	12.9	40	3	–	–	–	–	–	–	–	–	–	–
2008	NYG	**16**	12	48	580	12.1	40	4	–	–	–	–	–	–	–	–	–	–
Career		190	141	668	9,497	14.2	82	54	12	110	9.2	28	1	124	1,317	10.6	87	3

=== Postseason ===
Year	Team	Games		Receiving					Rushing					Returning				
Year	Team	GP	GS	Rec	Yds	Avg	Lng	TD	Att	Yds	Avg	Lng	TD	Ret	Yds	Avg	Lng	TD
1997	NYG	1	0	Did not record any stats										3	11	3.7	8	0
2000	NYG	3	3	10	135	13.5	24	1	**1**	**6**	**6.0**	**6**	0	**5**	**34**	**6.8**	**17**	0
2002	NYG	1	1	8	136	**17.0**	46	**3**	–	–	–	–	–	–	−	−	–	–
2005	NYG	1	1	3	31	10.3	13	0	–	–	–	–	–	–	–	–	–	–
2007	NYG	**4**	**4**	**21**	**280**	13.3	**52**	**3**	–	–	–	–	–	–	–	–	–	–
2008	NYG	1	0	2	26	13.0	20	0	–	–	–	–	–	–	–	–	–	–
Career		11	9	44	608	13.8	52	7	1	6	6.0	6	0	8	45	5.6	17	0
