= Pigskin Classic =

Pigskin Classic (defunct)
- Stadium: Rotating
- Previous stadiums: Anaheim Stadium
- Previous locations: Anaheim, California
- Operated: 1990–2002

Sponsors
- Disneyland (1990–94)

Former names
- Disneyland Pigskin Classic (1990–94)

The Pigskin Classic was a season-opening college football game played at Anaheim Stadium from 1990 until 1994, and continued from 1995 to 2002 at various stadiums. It was initially created as a west-coast counterpart of the Kickoff Classic and hosted by the National Association of Collegiate Directors of Athletics. From 1990 to 1994 it was sponsored by Disneyland and referred to as the Disneyland Pigskin Classic. Until 2002 the NCAA only allowed for teams to play a 12-game regular season schedule if the first game were a licensed Classic (such as the Pigskin Classic, the Kickoff Classic, or the Eddie Robinson Classic). In 2002 the NCAA ended the allowance of an extra 12th game, thus effectively ending the Classics. Kickoff games would later see a revival, in 2008 the Chick-fil-A Kickoff Game was organized as a neutral-site game held in Atlanta.

== Results ==
Date	Winning Team		Losing Team		Site	Network	Announcers
August 26, 1990	No. 8 Tennessee Volunteers	31	No. 5 Colorado Buffaloes	31	Anaheim Stadium • Anaheim, CA	NBC	Don Criqui, Bill Walsh, and Ahmad Rashad
August 29, 1991	No. 1 Florida State Seminoles	44	No. 17 BYU Cougars	28	Anaheim Stadium • Anaheim, CA	Raycom	Phil Stone and Craig James
August 26, 1992	No. 7 Texas A&M Aggies	10	No. 17 Stanford Cardinal	7	Anaheim Stadium • Anaheim, CA	Raycom	Phil Stone and Dave Rowe
August 29, 1993	No. 20 North Carolina Tar Heels	31	No. 18 USC Trojans	9	Anaheim Stadium • Anaheim, CA	Raycom	
August 29, 1994	No. 20 Ohio State Buckeyes	34	Fresno State Bulldogs	10	Anaheim Stadium • Anaheim, CA	Raycom	
August 26, 1995	No. 13 Michigan Wolverines	18	No. 17 Virginia Cavaliers	17	Michigan Stadium • Ann Arbor, MI	ABC	
August 24, 1996	BYU Cougars	41	No. 13 Texas A&M Aggies	37	Cougar Stadium • Provo, UT	ABC	
August 23, 1997	Northwestern Wildcats	24	Oklahoma Sooners	0	Soldier Field • Chicago, IL	ABC	
August 30, 1998	USC Trojans	27	Purdue Boilermakers	17	Los Angeles Memorial Coliseum • Los Angeles, CA	ABC	
August 28, 1999	No. 3 Penn State Nittany Lions	41	No. 4 Arizona Wildcats	7	Beaver Stadium • State College, PA	ABC	
August 26, 2000	No. 2 Florida State Seminoles	24	BYU Cougars	3	Alltel Stadium • Jacksonville, FL	ABC	
August 25, 2001	No. 4 Nebraska Cornhuskers	21	TCU Horned Frogs	7	Memorial Stadium • Lincoln, NE	ABC	
August 24, 2002	No. 13 Ohio State Buckeyes	45	Texas Tech Red Raiders	21	Ohio Stadium • Columbus, OH	ABC	

Rankings from AP Poll prior to game.
