= 2018 Indiana Hoosiers football team =

American college football season

2018 Indiana Hoosiers football
- Conference: Big Ten Conference
- East Division
- Record: 5–7 (2–7 Big Ten)
- Head coach: Tom Allen (2nd season)
- Offensive coordinator: Mike DeBord (2nd season)
- Offensive scheme: Multiple
- Defensive coordinator: Mark Hagen (2nd season)
- Base defense: 4–2–5
- MVP: Jonathan Crawford
- Captains: Jonathan Crawford; Wes Martin; Jacob Robinson; Luke Timian
- Home stadium: Memorial Stadium

2018 Big Ten Conference football standings
	Conf.			Overall
Team	W		L	W		L
East Division
No. 3 Ohio State xy$	8	–	1	13	–	1
No. 14 Michigan x	8	–	1	10	–	3
No. 17 Penn State	6	–	3	9	–	4
Michigan State	5	–	4	7	–	6
Maryland	3	–	6	5	–	7
Indiana	2	–	7	5	–	7
Rutgers	0	–	9	1	–	11
West Division
No. 21 Northwestern xy	8	–	1	9	–	5
Wisconsin	5	–	4	8	–	5
No. 25 Iowa	5	–	4	9	–	4
Purdue	5	–	4	6	–	7
Minnesota	3	–	6	7	–	6
Nebraska	3	–	6	4	–	8
Illinois	2	–	7	4	–	8
Championship: Ohio State 45, Northwestern 24
$ – Conference champion; x – Division champion/co-champions; y – Championship game participant; Rankings from AP Poll

The 2018 Indiana Hoosiers football team represented Indiana University in the 2018 NCAA Division I FBS football season. The Hoosiers played their home games at Memorial Stadium in Bloomington, Indiana. Indiana competed as a member of the East Division of the Big Ten Conference. The team was led by second-year head coach Tom Allen.

== Spring Game ==
The 2018 Spring Game took place in Bloomington on April 14 at 12 p.m.

Date	Time	Spring Game	Site	TV	Result	Attendance
April 14^{[1]}	12:00 p.m.	Cream vs. Crimson	Memorial Stadium • Bloomington, IN	BTN	Crimson 37–28	

- ^{^[1]} Due to inclement weather in the area, the annual spring game was closed to the public and moved inside Mellencamp Pavilion.

== Offseason ==
=== Coaching changes ===
On January 4, 2018, the Hoosiers announced the hiring of David Ballou as new strength and conditioning coach, following the release of Keith Caton, who served one season in the position. On January 8, 2018, the Hoosiers announced the hiring of Kane Wommack as the new linebackers coach. Current Hoosiers linebackers coach, William Inge, will transition to special teams coach prior to the start of the football season. On February 27, 2018, Kasey Teegardin was hired to the position of safeties coach, following the departure of former safeties coach, Noah Joseph.

=== Departures ===
Notable departures from the 2017 squad included:

Name	Number	Pos.	Height	Weight	Year	Hometown	Notes
Tegray Scales	8	Outside Linebacker	6'0"	227	Senior	Cincinnati, Ohio	Graduated
Griffin Oakes	92	Placekicker	5'9"	200	Senior	Greenwood, Indiana	Graduated
Simmie Cobbs	1	Wide receiver	6'4"	220	Junior (Redshirt)	Oak Park, Illinois	Declared for 2018 NFL draft

=== 2018 NFL draft ===
Hoosiers who were picked in the 2018 NFL draft:

Round	Pick	Player	Position	Team
4	101	Ian Thomas	TE	Carolina Panthers
6	193	Chris Covington	LB	Dallas Cowboys
UFA		Simmie Cobbs	WR	Washington Redskins
UFA		Rashard Fant	CB	Chicago Bears
UFA		Robert McCray	DB	Kansas City Chiefs
UFA		Tegray Scales	LB	Los Angeles Rams

== Preseason ==
=== Recruits ===
The Hoosiers signed a total of 26 recruits.

College recruiting (2018)
Name	Hometown	School	Height	Weight	Commit date
Jordan Jusevtich; S	Lowell, Indiana	Lowell High School	6 ft 0 in (1.83 m)	220 lb (100 kg)	Jan 21, 2017
Jordan Jusevtich; S	Recruit ratings: Scout: Rivals: 247Sports: ESPN:				
Elijah Rodgers; CB	Blacksburg, South Carolina	Blacksburg High School	6 ft 1 in (1.85 m)	170 lb (77 kg)	Apr 1, 2017
Elijah Rodgers; CB	Recruit ratings: Scout: Rivals: 247Sports: ESPN:				
Jacolby Hewitt; WR	Cordova, Tennessee	Cordova High School	6 ft 2 in (1.88 m)	190 lb (86 kg)	Jun 10, 2017
Jacolby Hewitt; WR	Recruit ratings: Scout: Rivals: 247Sports: ESPN:				
Matt Bjorson; TE	Hinsdale, Illinois	Central High School	6 ft 3 in (1.91 m)	225 lb (102 kg)	Jun 14, 2017
Matt Bjorson; TE	Recruit ratings: Scout: Rivals: 247Sports: ESPN:				
Nick Marozas; OT	Chicago, Illinois	Brother Rice High School	6 ft 5 in (1.96 m)	270 lb (120 kg)	Jun 19, 2017
Nick Marozas; OT	Recruit ratings: Scout: Rivals: 247Sports: ESPN:				
Gavin McCabe; DE	Chicago, Illinois	Marist High School	6 ft 3 in (1.91 m)	250 lb (110 kg)	Jun 20, 2017
Gavin McCabe; DE	Recruit ratings: Scout: Rivals: 247Sports: ESPN:				
Aaron Casey; LB	Douglasville, Georgia	Alexander High School	6 ft 1 in (1.85 m)	209 lb (95 kg)	Jun 20, 2017
Aaron Casey; LB	Recruit ratings: Scout: Rivals: 247Sports: ESPN:				
Charles Campbell; K	Jackson, Tennessee	University School of Jackson	5 ft 8 in (1.73 m)	175 lb (79 kg)	Jul 16, 2017
Charles Campbell; K	Recruit ratings: Scout: Rivals: 247Sports: ESPN:				
Miles Marshall; WR	Lilburn, Georgia	Parkview High School	6 ft 3 in (1.91 m)	200 lb (91 kg)	Jul 20, 2017
Miles Marshall; WR	Recruit ratings: Scout: Rivals: 247Sports: ESPN:				
James Head; DE	Miami, Florida	Southridge High School	6 ft 5 in (1.96 m)	213 lb (97 kg)	Jul 21, 2017
James Head; DE	Recruit ratings: Scout: Rivals: 247Sports: ESPN:				
Aidan Rafferty; OT	Washington, D.C.	Gonzaga College High School	6 ft 6 in (1.98 m)	280 lb (130 kg)	Jul 21, 2017
Aidan Rafferty; OT	Recruit ratings: Scout: Rivals: 247Sports: ESPN:				
Micah McFadden; LB	Tampa, Florida	Plant High School	6 ft 1 in (1.85 m)	220 lb (100 kg)	Jul 30, 2017
Micah McFadden; LB	Recruit ratings: Scout: Rivals: 247Sports: ESPN:				
Jaylin Williams; CB	Germantown, Tennessee	Germantown High School	5 ft 11 in (1.80 m)	170 lb (77 kg)	Aug 1, 2017
Jaylin Williams; CB	Recruit ratings: Scout: Rivals: 247Sports: ESPN:				
Reese Taylor; QB	Indianapolis, Indiana	Ben Davis High School	5 ft 10 in (1.78 m)	171 lb (78 kg)	Aug 2, 2017
Reese Taylor; QB	Recruit ratings: Scout: Rivals: 247Sports: ESPN:				
Ronnie Walker; RB	Hopewell, Virginia	Hopewell High School	5 ft 10 in (1.78 m)	190 lb (86 kg)	Aug 28, 2017
Ronnie Walker; RB	Recruit ratings: Scout: Rivals: 247Sports: ESPN:				
Madison Norris; DE	Fishers, Indiana	Hamilton Southeastern High School	6 ft 4 in (1.93 m)	200 lb (91 kg)	Oct 6, 2017
Madison Norris; DE	Recruit ratings: Scout: Rivals: 247Sports: ESPN:				
Shamar Jones; DT	Johnstown, Pennsylvania	Greater Johnstown High School	6 ft 1 in (1.85 m)	271 lb (123 kg)	Oct 13, 2017
Shamar Jones; DT	Recruit ratings: Scout: Rivals: 247Sports: ESPN:				
Cam Jones; LB	Memphis, Tennessee	St. Benedict at Auburndale High School	6 ft 2 in (1.88 m)	210 lb (95 kg)	Oct 21, 2017
Cam Jones; LB	Recruit ratings: Scout: Rivals: 247Sports: ESPN:				
TJ Ivy; TE	Chicago, Illinois	Marist High School	6 ft 5 in (1.96 m)	217 lb (98 kg)	Oct 23, 2017
TJ Ivy; TE	Recruit ratings: Scout: Rivals: 247Sports: ESPN:				
Devon Matthews; DB	Jacksonville, Florida	Jean Ribault High School	6 ft 2 in (1.88 m)	182 lb (83 kg)	Dec 11, 2017
Devon Matthews; DB	Recruit ratings: Scout: Rivals: 247Sports: ESPN:				
Stevie Scott III; RB	Albany, New York	Christian Brothers Academy	6 ft 1 in (1.85 m)	240 lb (110 kg)	Dec 15, 2017
Stevie Scott III; RB	Recruit ratings: Scout: Rivals: 247Sports: ESPN:				
Noah Pierre; CB	Hialeah, Florida	Champagnat Catholic High School	5 ft 10 in (1.78 m)	170 lb (77 kg)	Dec 20, 2017
Noah Pierre; CB	Recruit ratings: Scout: Rivals: 247Sports: ESPN:				
Michael Penix Jr. QB	Tampa, Florida	Tampa Bay Technical High School	6 ft 2 in (1.88 m)	195 lb (88 kg)	Dec 20, 2017
Michael Penix Jr. QB	Recruit ratings: Scout: Rivals: 247Sports: ESPN:				
Jamar Johnson; CB	Sarasota, Florida	Riverview High School	6 ft 1 in (1.85 m)	190 lb (86 kg)	Jan 25, 2018
Jamar Johnson; CB	Recruit ratings: Scout: Rivals: 247Sports: ESPN:				
James Miller; LB	Seffner, Florida	Armwood High School	6 ft 1 in (1.85 m)	225 lb (102 kg)	Feb 7, 2018
James Miller; LB	Recruit ratings: Scout: Rivals: 247Sports: ESPN:				
Jonathan King; DE	Tampa, Florida	Tampa Bay Technical High School	6 ft 2 in (1.88 m)	240 lb (110 kg)	Feb 7, 2018
Jonathan King; DE	Recruit ratings: Scout: Rivals: 247Sports: ESPN:				
Overall recruit ranking:
Note: In many cases, Scout, Rivals, 247Sports, On3, and ESPN may conflict in their listings of height and weight.; In these cases, the average was taken. ESPN grades are on a 100-point scale.; Sources: "Indiana Football Commitments". Rivals.; "2018 Team Ranking". Rivals.com.

=== Returning starters ===
Indiana returns 17 offensive players and eight defensive players that started games for the team in 2017 along with punter Haydon Whitehead.

==== Offense ====
Player	Class	Position
Delroy Baker	Senior	Offensive Line
Coy Cronk	Junior	Offensive Line
Morgan Ellison	Sophomore	Running Back
Cole Gest	Sophomore	Running Back
Donavan Hale	Junior	Wide Receiver
J-Shun Harris II	Senior	Wide Receiver
Hunter Littlejohn	Junior	Offensive Line
Brandon Knight	Senior	Offensive Line
Mike Majette	Senior	Running Back
Wes Martin	Senior	Offensive Line
Whop Philyor	Sophomore	Wide Receiver
Luke Timian	Senior	Wide Receiver
Mackenzie Nworah	Sophomore	Offensive Line
Peyton Ramsey	Sophomore	Quarterback
Simon Stepaniak	Junior	Offensive Line
Ryan Watercutter	Senior	Tight End
Nick Westbrook-Ikhine	Junior	Wide Receiver

==== Defense ====
Player	Class	Position
Marcelino McCrary-Ball	Sophomore	Defensive Back
Mike Barwick Jr.	Senior	Defensive Line
Andre Brown Jr.	Junior	Defensive Back
Jonathan Crawford	Senior	Defensive Back
Raheem Layne	Sophomore	Cornerback
A'Shon Riggins	Junior	Defensive Back
Jacob Robinson	Senior	Defensive Line
Brandon Wilson	Junior	Defensive Line

==== Special teams ====
Player	Class	Position
Haydon Whitehead	Junior	Punter

== Schedule ==
The Hoosiers' 2018 schedule consisted of 7 home games and 5 away games. The Hoosiers first non-conference game was away at FIU of Conference USA (C-USA), before hosting the remaining two non-conference games; against Virginia from the Atlantic Coast Conference (ACC) and against Ball State of the Mid-American Conference (MAC).

The Hoosiers played nine conference games; they hosted Michigan State, Iowa, Penn State, Maryland and Purdue. They traveled to Rutgers, Ohio State, Minnesota, and Michigan.

Date	Time	Opponent	Site	TV	Result	Attendance
September 1	7:00 p.m.	at FIU*	Riccardo Silva Stadium; Miami, FL	CBSSN	W 38–28	17,082
September 8	7:30 p.m.	Virginia*	Memorial Stadium; Bloomington, IN	BTN	W 20–16	35,492
September 15	12:00 p.m.	Ball State*	Memorial Stadium; Bloomington, IN	BTN	W 38–10	40,240
September 22	7:30 p.m.	No. 24 Michigan State	Memorial Stadium; Bloomington, IN (rivalry)	BTN	L 21–35	45,445
September 29	12:00 p.m.	at Rutgers	HighPoint.com Stadium; Piscataway, NJ	BTN	W 24–17	32,056
October 6	4:00 p.m.	at No. 3 Ohio State	Ohio Stadium; Columbus, OH	FOX	L 26–49	104,193
October 13	12:00 p.m.	Iowa^{†}	Memorial Stadium; Bloomington, IN	ESPN2	L 16–42	40,512
October 20	3:30 p.m.	No. 18 Penn State	Memorial Stadium; Bloomington, IN	ABC	L 28–33	41,553
October 26	8:00 p.m.	at Minnesota	TCF Bank Stadium; Minneapolis, MN	FS1	L 31–38	33,273
November 10	12:00 p.m.	Maryland	Memorial Stadium; Bloomington, IN	BTN	W 34–32	35,264
November 17	4:00 p.m.	at No. 4 Michigan	Michigan Stadium; Ann Arbor, MI	FS1	L 20–31	110,118
November 24	12:00 p.m.	Purdue	Memorial Stadium; Bloomington, IN (Old Oaken Bucket)	ESPN2	L 21–28	48,247
*Non-conference game; ^{†}Homecoming; Rankings from AP Poll released prior to the game; All times are in Eastern time

== Game summaries ==
=== At FIU ===
Indiana Hoosiers (0–0) at FIU Panthers (0–0) – Game summary

Quarter	1	2	3	4	Total
Hoosiers	14	14	7	3	38
Panthers	7	7	7	7	28

at Riccardo Silva Stadium • Miami, Florida

- Date: September 1, 2018
- Game time: 7:00 p.m.
- Game weather: Cloudy, 86 °F (30 °C)
- Game attendance: 17,082
- Referee: Daniel Capron
- TV announcers (CBS): Brad Johansen (play-by-play), Danny Kanell (analyst)
- Sources: IUHoosiers.com

Game information

First quarter

- (7:42) FIU – Anthony Jones 2-yard run, José Borregales kick (Drive: 11 plays, 66 yards, 4:01; Florida International 7–0)
- (4:59) IU – Donavan Hale 18-yard pass from Peyton Ramsey, Logan Justus kick (Drive: 7 plays, 75 yards, 2:43; Tied 7–7)
- (4:01) IU – Jonathan Crawford 33-yard interception return, Logan Justus kick (Drive: 2 plays, 3 yards, 0:14; Indiana 14–7)

Second quarter

- (13:42) IU – Peyton Hendershot 3-yard pass from Peyton Ramsey, Logan Justus kick (Drive: 12 plays, 68 yards, 2:24; Indiana 21–7)
- (6:12) FIU – Anthony Jones 36-yard run, José Borregales kick (Drive: 8 plays, 79 yards, 3:32; Indiana 21–14)
- (3:41) IU – Donavan Hale 2-yard pass from Peyton Ramsey, Logan Justus kick (Drive: 10 plays, 85 yards, 2:31; Indiana 28–14)

Third quarter

- (7:39) IU – Mike Majette 9-yard pass from Michael Penix Jr., Logan Justus kick (Drive: 10 plays, 87 yards, 3:16; Indiana 35–14)
- (1:11) FIU – Shawndarrius Phillips 1-yard run, José Borregales kick (Drive: 18 plays, 68 yards, 6:21; Indiana 35–21)

Fourth quarter

- (9:58) IU – Logan Justus 36-yard field goal (Drive: 15 plays, 85 yards, 5:53; Indiana 38–21)
- (6:04) FIU – Maurice Alexander 7-yard pass from James Morgan, José Borregales kick (Drive: 11 plays, 75 yards, 3:53; Indiana 38–28)

Statistics	IU	FIU
First downs	31	22
Total yards	465	327
Rushes/yards	45–213	39–170
Passing yards	252	157
Passing: Comp–Att–Int	28–37–1	17–28–1
Time of possession	32:35	27:25

Team	Category	Player	Statistics
Indiana	Passing	Peyton Ramsey	20/27, 156 yards, 3 TD, INT
Indiana	Rushing	Stevie Scott III	20 carries, 70 yards
Indiana	Receiving	Donavan Hale	4 receptions, 60 yards, 2 TD
Florida International	Passing	James Morgan	11/20, 90 yards, TD, INT
Florida International	Rushing	Anthony Jones	15 carries, 88 yards, 2 TD
Florida International	Receiving	C. J. Worton	5 receptions, 69 yards

=== vs Virginia ===
Virginia Cavaliers (1–0) vs Indiana Hoosiers (1–0) – Game summary

Quarter	1	2	3	4	Total
Cavaliers	9	0	7	0	16
Hoosiers	13	7	0	0	20

at Memorial Stadium • Bloomington, Indiana

- Date: September 8, 2018
- Game time: 7:30 p.m.
- Game weather: Rainy, 66 °F (19 °C)
- Game attendance: 35,492
- Referee: Jeff Maconaghy
- TV announcers (BTN): Lisa Byington (play-by-play), Jeremy Leman (analyst)
- Sources: IUHoosiers.com

Game information

First quarter

- (9:36) UVA – Olamide Zaccheaus 1-yard pass from Bryce Perkins, A. J. Mejia kick (Drive: 11 plays, 71 yards, 5:24; Virginia 7–0)
- (6:27) IU – Stevie Scott III 40-yard run, Logan Justus kick (Drive: 9 plays, 75 yards, 3:14; Tied 7–7)
- (5:53) IU – Donavan Hale 9-yard pass from Peyton Ramsey (Drive: 2 plays, 21 yards, 0:29; Indiana 13–7)
- (5:53) UVA – Juan Thornhill 98-yard defensive PAT return (Drive: 0 plays, 0 yards, 0:00; Indiana 13–9)

Second quarter

- (1:36) IU – Nick Westbrook-Ikhine 23-yard pass from Peyton Ramsey, Logan Justus kick (Drive: 3 plays, 74 yards, 0:52; Indiana 20–9)

Third quarter

- (7:59) UVA – Chris Sharp 20-yard pass from Bryce Perkins, A. J. Mejia kick (Drive: 7 plays, 71 yards, 3:54; Indiana 20–16)

Fourth quarter

None

Statistics	UVA	IU
First downs	15	21
Total yards	294	387
Rushes/yards	39–188	44–237
Passing yards	106	150
Passing: Comp–Att–Int	12–25–0	16–22–1
Time of possession	30:24	29:36

Team	Category	Player	Statistics
Virginia	Passing	Bryce Perkins	12/24, 106 yards, 2 TD
Virginia	Rushing	Bryce Perkins	25 carries, 123 yards
Virginia	Receiving	Hasise Dubois	4 receptions, 49 yards
Indiana	Passing	Peyton Ramsey	16/22, 150 yards, 2 TD, INT
Indiana	Rushing	Stevie Scott III	31 carries, 204 yards, TD
Indiana	Receiving	Donavan Hale	4 receptions, 56 yards, TD

=== vs Ball State ===
Ball State Cardinals (1–1) vs Indiana Hoosiers (2–0) – Game summary

Quarter	1	2	3	4	Total
Cardinals	3	0	7	0	10
Hoosiers	3	21	7	7	38

at Memorial Stadium • Bloomington, Indiana

- Date: September 15, 2018
- Game time: 12:00 p.m.
- Game weather: Sunny, 84 °F (29 °C)
- Game attendance: 40,240
- Referee: Ron Snodgrass
- TV announcers (BTN): Chris Denari (play-by-play), Bobby Carpenter (analyst)
- Sources: IUHoosiers.com

Game information

First quarter

- (11:01) BALL – Morgan Hagee 31-yard field goal (Drive: 11 plays, 61 yards, 3:55; Ball State 3–0)
- (7:47) IU – Logan Justus 21-yard field goal (Drive: 12 plays, 70 yards, 3:03; Tied 3–3)

Second quarter

- (14:55) IU – Stevie Scott III 1-yard run, Logan Justus kick (Drive: 12 plays, 89 yards, 4:39; Indiana 10–3)
- (12:26) IU – J-Shun Harris 86-yard punt return, Logan Justus kick (Drive: 5 plays, 22 yards, 2:07; Indiana 17–3)
- (0:22) IU – Peyton Ramsey 5-yard run, Logan Justus kick (Drive: 9 plays, 72 yards, 2:51; Indiana 24–3)

Third quarter

- (8:52) IU – Ronnie Walker 18-yard run, Logan Justus kick (Drive: 11 plays, 68 yards, 3:42; Indiana 31–3)
- (2:08) BALL – James Gilbert 27-yard run, Morgan Hagee kick (Drive: 7 plays, 60 yards, 2:26; Indiana 31–10)

Fourth quarter

- (10:11) IU – Stevie Scott III 11-yard run, Logan Justus kick (Drive: 3 plays, 38 yards, 1:39; Indiana 38–10)

Statistics	BALL	IU
First downs	18	26
Total yards	347	457
Rushes/yards	39–204	44–255
Passing yards	143	202
Passing: Comp–Att–Int	14–28–1	24–32–0
Time of possession	27:17	32:43

Team	Category	Player	Statistics
Ball State	Passing	Riley Neal	12/24, 115 yards
Ball State	Rushing	James Gilbert	16 carries, 89 yards, TD
Ball State	Receiving	Corey Lacanaria	4 receptions, 40 yards
Indiana	Passing	Peyton Ramsey	20/27, 173 yards
Indiana	Rushing	Stevie Scott III	18 carries, 114 yards, 2 TD
Indiana	Receiving	Luke Timian	5 receptions, 56 yards

=== vs No. 24 Michigan State ===
No. 24 Michigan State Spartans (1–1) vs Indiana Hoosiers (3–0) – Game summary

Quarter	1	2	3	4	Total
No. 24 Spartans	14	7	7	7	35
Hoosiers	0	7	0	14	21

at Memorial Stadium • Bloomington, Indiana

- Date: September 22, 2018
- Game time: 7:30 p.m.
- Game weather: Cloudy, 63 °F (17 °C)
- Game attendance: 45,445
- Referee: Mark Kluczynski
- TV announcers (BTN): Brandon Gaudin (play-by-play), Glen Mason (analyst), Elise Menaker (sideline)
- Sources: IUHoosiers.com

Game information

First quarter

- (8:11) MSU – Jalen Nailor 16-yard pass from Brian Lewerke, Matt Coghlin kick (Drive: 8 plays, 60 yards, 3:57; Michigan State 7–0)
- (5:35) MSU – Shakur Brown 69-yard interception return, Matt Coghlin kick (Drive: 7 plays, 46 yards, 2:36; Michigan State 14–0)

Second quarter

- (6:54) IU – Stevie Scott III 8-yard pass from Peyton Ramsey, Logan Justus kick (Drive: 10 plays, 51 yards, 3:18; Michigan State 14–7)
- (0:19) MSU – Matt Dotson 11-yard pass from Brian Lewerke, Matt Coghlin kick (Drive: 7 plays, 74 yards, 1:04; Michigan State 21–7)

Third quarter

- (4:47) MSU – Matt Coghlin 6-yard run, Matt Coghlin kick (Drive: 9 plays, 67 yards, 4:49; Michigan State 28–7)

Fourth quarter

- (14:43) IU – Logan Justus 35-yard field goal (Drive: 4 plays, -11 yards, 0:56; Michigan State 28–10)
- (8:19) IU – Whop Philyor 65-yard pass from Peyton Ramsey, Peyton Ramsey two-point pass to Nick Westbrook-Ikhine (Drive: 7 plays, 90 yards, 1:58; Michigan State 28–18)
- (3:28) IU – Logan Justus 36-yard field goal (Drive: 10 plays, 57 yards, 2:28; Michigan State 28–21)
- (3:17) MSU – Jalen Nailor 75-yard run, Matt Coghlin kick (Drive: 1 play, 75 yards, 0:11; Michigan State 35–21)

Statistics	MSU	IU
First downs	19	18
Total yards	350	301
Rushes/yards	40–131	32–29
Passing yards	219	272
Passing: Comp–Att–Int	15–26–2	32–46–2
Time of possession	31:23	28:37

Team	Category	Player	Statistics
Michigan State	Passing	Brian Lewerke	14/25, 213 yards, 2 TD, 2 INT
Michigan State	Rushing	Jalen Nailor	3 carries, 79 yards, TD
Michigan State	Receiving	Felton Davis	5 receptions, 79 yards
Indiana	Passing	Peyton Ramsey	32/46, 272 yards, 2 TD, 2 INT
Indiana	Rushing	Stevie Scott III	11 carries, 18 yards
Indiana	Receiving	Whop Philyor	13 receptions, 148 yards, TD

=== At Rutgers ===
Indiana Hoosiers (3–1) at Rutgers Scarlet Knights (1–3) – Game summary

Quarter	1	2	3	4	Total
Hoosiers	7	17	0	0	24
Scarlet Knights	7	0	0	10	17

at High Point Solutions Stadium • Piscataway, New Jersey

- Date: September 29, 2018
- Game time: 12:00 p.m.
- Game weather: Sunny, 73 °F (23 °C)
- Game attendance: 32,056
- Referee: Jerry McGinn
- TV announcers (BTN): Brandon Gaudin (play-by-play), Glen Mason (analyst)
- Sources: IUHoosiers.com

Game information

First quarter

- (10:46) RUTG – Shameen Jones 11-yard from Artur Sitkowski, Justin Davidovicz kick (Drive: 10 plays, 75 yards, 4:14; Rutgers 7–0)
- (7:33) IU – Stevie Scott III 16-yard run, Logan Justus kick (Drive: 10 plays, 75 yards, 3:13; Tied 7–7)

Second quarter

- (14:56) IU – Peyton Ramsey 1-yard run, Logan Justus kick (Drive: 16 plays, 88 yards, 6:09; Indiana 14–7)
- (9:21) IU – J-Shun Harris 2-yard pass from Peyton Ramsey, Logan Justus kick (Drive: 10 plays, 68 yards, 4:12; Indiana 21–7)
- (0:20) IU – Logan Justus 44-yard field goal (Drive: 11 plays, 54 yards, 3:55; Indiana 24–7)

Third quarter

None

Fourth quarter

- (10:40) RUTG – Jonathan Hilliman 1-yard run, Justin Davidovicz kick (Drive: 3 plays, 55 yards, 1:18; Indiana 24–14)
- (3:52) RUTG – Justin Davidovicz 52-yard field goal (Drive: 14 plays, 48 yards, 3:55; Indiana 24–17)

Statistics	IU	RUTG
First downs	24	19
Total yards	451	291
Rushes/yards	42–163	23–98
Passing yards	288	193
Passing: Comp–Att–Int	27–40–1	19–36–1
Time of possession	35:24	24:36

Team	Category	Player	Statistics
Indiana	Passing	Peyton Ramsey	27/40, 288 yards, TD, INT
Indiana	Rushing	Stevie Scott III	18 carries, 58 yards, TD
Indiana	Receiving	Ty Fryfogle	5 receptions, 70 yards
Rutgers	Passing	Artur Sitkowski	18/35, 154 yards, TD, INT
Rutgers	Rushing	Raheem Blackshear	8 carries, 64 yards
Rutgers	Receiving	Jerome Washington	2 receptions, 55 yards

=== At No. 3 Ohio State ===
Indiana Hoosiers (4–1) at No. 3 Ohio State Buckeyes (5–0) – Game summary

Quarter	1	2	3	4	Total
Hoosiers	3	17	6	0	26
No. 3 Buckeyes	7	21	7	14	49

at Ohio Stadium • Columbus, Ohio

- Date: October 6, 2018
- Game time: 4:00 p.m.
- Game weather: Partly cloudy, 82 °F (28 °C)
- Game attendance: 104,193
- Referee: Larry Smith
- TV announcers (FOX): Aaron Goldsmith (play-by-play), Brady Quinn (analyst)
- Sources: IUHoosiers.com

Game information

First quarter

- (11:47) IU – Logan Justus 37-yard field goal (Drive: 7 plays, 56 yards, 3:13; Indiana 3–0)
- (2:58) OSU – J. K. Dobbins 1-yard run, Sean Nuernberger kick (Drive: 9 plays, 71 yards, 3:06; Ohio State 7–3)

Second quarter

- (12:21) OSU – Johnnie Dixon 39-yard pass from Dwayne Haskins, Sean Nuernberger kick (Drive: 9 plays, 78 yards, 3:28; Ohio State 14–3)
- (10:59) IU – Peyton Hendershot 32-yard pass from Peyton Ramsey, Logan Justus kick (Drive: 5 plays, 75 yards, 1:22; Ohio State 14–10)
- (7:04) IU – Nick Westbrook Ikhine 19-yard pass from Peyton Ramsey, Logan Justus kick (Drive: 6 plays, 70 yards, 1:33; Indiana 17–14)
- (4:39) OSU – Parris Campbell 18-yard pass from Dwayne Haskins, Sean Nuernberger kick (Drive: 6 plays, 75 yards, 2:25; Ohio State 21–17)
- (2:16) OSU – Terry McLaurin 7-yard pass from Dwayne Haskins, Sean Nuernberger kick (Drive: 6 plays, 32 yards, 2:16; Ohio State 28–17)
- (0:40) IU – Logan Justus 37-yard field goal (Drive: 8 plays, 56 yards, 1:36; Ohio State 28–20)

Third quarter

- (14:09) OSU – Parris Campbell 71-yard pass from Dwayne Haskins, Sean Nuernberger kick (Drive: 3 plays, 75 yards, 0:51; Ohio State 35–20)
- (4:53) IU – Donavan Hale 3-yard pass from Peyton Ramsey (Drive: 8 plays, 58 yards, 2:44; Ohio State 35–26)

Fourth quarter

- (12:21) OSU – Terry McLaurin 17-yard pass from Dwayne Haskins, Sean Nuernberger kick (Drive: 10 plays, 67 yards, 2:56; Ohio State 42–26)
- (6:51) OSU – Binjimin Victor 30-yard pass from Dwayne Haskins, Sean Nuernberger kick (Drive: 10 plays, 76 yards, 4:18; Ohio State 49–26)

Statistics	IU	OSU
First downs	22	33
Total yards	406	609
Rushes/yards	21–84	48–154
Passing yards	322	455
Passing: Comp–Att–Int	26–49–0	33–44–2
Time of possession	23:18	36:42

Team	Category	Player	Statistics
Indiana	Passing	Peyton Ramsey	26/49, 322 yards, 3 TD
Indiana	Rushing	Stevie Scott III	9 carries, 64 yards
Indiana	Receiving	Nick Westbrook-Ikhine	5 receptions, 109 yards, TD
Ohio State	Passing	Dwayne Haskins	33/44, 455 yards, 6 TD, 2 INT
Ohio State	Rushing	J. K. Dobbins	26 carries, 82 yards, TD
Ohio State	Receiving	Parris Campbell	9 receptions, 142 yards, 2 TD

=== vs Iowa ===
Iowa Hawkeyes (4–1) vs Indiana Hoosiers (4–2) – Game summary

Quarter	1	2	3	4	Total
Hawkeyes	14	7	14	7	42
Hoosiers	3	7	6	0	16

at Memorial Stadium • Bloomington, Indiana

- Date: October 13, 2018
- Game time: 12:00 p.m.
- Game weather: Partly cloudy, 52 °F (11 °C)
- Game attendance: 40,512
- Referee: Jeff Servinski
- TV announcers (ESPN2): Beth Mowins (play-by-play), Anthony Becht (analyst), Rocky Boiman (sideline)
- Sources: IUHoosiers.com

Game information

First quarter

- (10:32) IU – Logan Justus 29-yard field goal (Drive: 13 plays, 56 yards, 4:28; Indiana 3–0)
- (7:15) IOWA – T. J. Hockenson 9-yard pass from Nate Stanley, Miguel Recinos kick (Drive: 5 plays, 74 yards, 3:17; Iowa 7–3)
- (1:21) IOWA – Noah Fant 28-yard pass from Nate Stanley, Miguel Recinos kick (Drive: 11 plays, 70 yards, 4:07; Iowa 14–3)

Second quarter

- (12:17) IU – Ty Fryfogle 33-yard pass from Peyton Ramsey, Logan Justus kick (Drive: 2 plays, 34 yards, 0:34; Iowa 14–10)
- (10:03) IOWA – Nick Easley 12-yard pass from Nate Stanley, Miguel Recinos kick (Drive: 4 plays, 38 yards, 2:14; Iowa 21–10)

Third quarter

- (12:03) IOWA – Toren Young 11-yard pass from Nate Stanley, Miguel Recinos kick (Drive: 7 plays, 63 yards, 2:57; Iowa 28–10)
- (9:19) IOWA – T. J. Hockenson 54-yard pass from Nate Stanley, Miguel Recinos kick (Drive: 3 plays, 61 yards, 1:29; Iowa 35–10)
- (5:55) IU – Peyton Ramsey 12-yard run (Drive: 8 plays, 75 yards, 3:24; Iowa 35–16)

Fourth quarter

- (9:23) IOWA – Austin Kelly 4-yard pass from Nate Stanley, Miguel Recinos kick (Drive: 9 plays, 80 yards, 3:59; Iowa 42–16)

Statistics	IOWA	IU
First downs	26	22
Total yards	479	330
Rushes/yards	32–159	25–67
Passing yards	320	263
Passing: Comp–Att–Int	21–33–1	31–42–2
Time of possession	33:10	26:50

Team	Category	Player	Statistics
Iowa	Passing	Nate Stanley	21/33, 320 yards, 6 TD, INT
Iowa	Rushing	Toren Young	19 carries, 96 yards
Iowa	Receiving	T. J. Hockenson	4 receptions, 107 yards, 2 TD
Indiana	Passing	Peyton Ramsey	31/42, 263 yards, TD, 2 INT
Indiana	Rushing	Stevie Scott III	8 carries, 29 yards
Indiana	Receiving	Ty Fryfogle	4 receptions, 71 yards, TD

=== vs No. 18 Penn State ===
No. 18 Penn State Nittany Lions (4–2) vs Indiana Hoosiers (4–3) – Game summary

Quarter	1	2	3	4	Total
No. 18 Nittany Lions	7	10	9	7	33
Hoosiers	14	0	7	7	28

at Memorial Stadium • Bloomington, Indiana

- Date: October 20, 2018
- Game time: 3:30 p.m.
- Game weather: Sunny, 59 °F (15 °C)
- Game attendance: 41,553
- Referee: John O'Neill
- TV announcers (ABC): Steve Levy (play-by-play), Brian Griese (analyst)
- Sources: IUHoosiers.com

Game information

First quarter

- (13:00) PSU – Miles Sanders 1-yard run, Jake Pinegar kick (Drive: 5 plays, 36 yards, 2:00; Penn State 7–0)
- (10:18) IU – Stevie Scott III 5-yard run, Logan Justus kick (Drive: 8 plays, 75 yards, 2:42; Tied 7–7)
- (1:06) IU – Ronnie Walker 30-yard run, Logan Justus kick (Drive: 4 plays, 42 yards, 1:03; Indiana 14–7)

Second quarter

- (10:08) PSU – Pat Freiermuth 23-yard pass from Tommy Stevens, Jake Pinegar kick (Drive: 6 plays, 83 yards, 2:02; Tied 14–14)
- (6:27) PSU – Jake Pinegar 27-yard field goal (Drive: 7 plays, 65 yards, 2:33; Penn State 17–14)

Third quarter

- (7:16) PSU – Jake Pinegar 32-yard field goal (Drive: 13 plays, 63 yards, 5:04; Penn State 20–14)
- (4:01) IU – Stevie Scott III 3-yard run, Logan Justus kick (Drive: 9 plays, 81 yards, 3:15; Indiana 21–20)
- (3:41) PSU – Trace McSorley 5-yard run (Drive: 1 play, 5 yards, 0:20; Penn State 26–21)

Fourth quarter

- (10:25) PSU – Trace McSorley 4-yard run, Jake Pinegar kick (Drive: 5 plays, 32 yards, 1:38; Penn State 33–21)
- (0:49) IU – J-Shun Harris 21-yard pass from Peyton Ramsey, Logan Justus kick (Drive: 15 plays, 85 yards, 3:17; Penn State 33–28)

Statistics	PSU	IU
First downs	20	32
Total yards	417	554
Rushes/yards	36–174	45–224
Passing yards	243	330
Passing: Comp–Att–Int	20–37–1	35–55–1
Time of possession	26:02	33:58

Team	Category	Player	Statistics
Penn State	Passing	Trace McSorley	19/36, 220 yards, TD
Penn State	Rushing	Trace McSorley	19 carries, 107 yards, 2 TD
Penn State	Receiving	Juwan Johnson	2 receptions, 72 yards
Indiana	Passing	Peyton Ramsey	26/36, 236 yards, TD, INT
Indiana	Rushing	Stevie Scott III	26 carries, 138 yards, 2 TD
Indiana	Receiving	Luke Timian	6 receptions, 58 yards

=== At Minnesota ===
Indiana Hoosiers (4–4) at Minnesota Golden Gophers (3–4) – Game summary

Quarter	1	2	3	4	Total
Hoosiers	6	3	0	22	31
Golden Gophers	7	14	10	7	38

at TCF Bank Stadium • Minneapolis, Minnesota

- Date: October 26, 2018
- Game time: 7:00 p.m. CST
- Game weather: Rainy, 46 °F (8 °C)
- Game attendance: 33,273
- Referee: Mark Kluczynski
- TV announcers (FS1): Aaron Goldsmith (play-by-play), Evan Moore (analyst)
- Sources: IUHoosiers.com

Game information

First quarter

- (9:27) IU – Logan Justus 33-yard field goal (Drive: 13 plays, 50 yards, 4:45; Indiana 3–0)
- (6:20) MINN – Seth Green 1-yard run, Emmit Carpenter kick (Drive: 7 plays, 65 yards, 3:08; Minnesota 7–3)
- (1:13) IU – Logan Justus 24-yard field goal (Drive: 13 plays, 57 yards, 4:59; Minnesota 7–6)

Second quarter

- (14:05) IU – Logan Justus 41-yard field goal (Drive: 5 plays, 11 yards, 0:33; Indiana 9–7)
- (6:19) MINN – Tyler Johnson 8-yard pass from Tanner Morgan, Emmit Carpenter kick (Drive: 15 plays, 65 yards, 7:44; Minnesota 14–9)
- (0:35) MINN – Tyler Johnson 18-yard pass from Tanner Morgan, Emmit Carpenter kick (Drive: 8 plays, 99 yards, 2:34; Minnesota 21–9)

Third quarter

- (7:56) MINN – Emmit Carpenter 37-yard field goal (Drive: 13 plays, 71 yards, 6:22; Minnesota 24–9)
- (5:33) MINN – Shannon Brooks 17-yard run, Emmit Carpenter kick (Drive: 3 plays, 28 yards, 1:36; Minnesota 31–9)

Fourth quarter

- (13:24) IU – Donavan Hale 43-yard pass from Peyton Ramsey (Drive: 2 plays, 47 yards, 0:32; Minnesota 31–15)
- (10:04) IU – Ty Fryfogle 37-yard pass from Peyton Ramsey, Peyton Ramsey two-point pass to Ty Fryfogle (Drive: 6 plays, 63 yards, 1:50; Minnesota 31–23)
- (3:57) IU – Stevie Scott III 3-yard run, Peyton Ramsey two-point pass to Donavan Hale (Drive: 11 plays, 50 yards, 3:14; Tied 31–31)
- (1:34) MINN – Rashod Bateman 67-yard pass from Tanner Morgan, Emmit Carpenter kick (Drive: 1 play, 67 yards, 0:11; Minnesota 38–31)

Statistics	IU	MINN
First downs	20	22
Total yards	385	482
Rushes/yards	30–153	40–180
Passing yards	232	302
Passing: Comp–Att–Int	29–44–2	17–24–1
Time of possession	29:37	30:23

Team	Category	Player	Statistics
Indiana	Passing	Peyton Ramsey	29/44, 232 yards, 2 TD, 2 INT
Indiana	Rushing	Stevie Scott III	18 carries, 96 yards, TD
Indiana	Receiving	Donavan Hale	4 receptions, 51 yards, TD
Minnesota	Passing	Tanner Morgan	17/24, 302 yards, 3 TD, INT
Minnesota	Rushing	Shannon Brooks	22 carries, 154 yards, TD
Minnesota	Receiving	Rashod Bateman	4 receptions, 108 yards, TD

=== vs Maryland ===
Maryland Terrapins (5–4) vs Indiana Hoosiers (4–5) – Game summary

Quarter	1	2	3	4	Total
Terrapins	6	9	8	9	32
Hoosiers	0	21	10	3	34

at Memorial Stadium • Bloomington, Indiana

- Date: November 10, 2018
- Game time: 12:00 p.m.
- Game weather: Sunny, 32 °F (0 °C)
- Game attendance: 35,264
- Referee: Michael Cannon
- TV announcers (BTN): Lisa Byington (play-by-play), Jeremy Leman (analyst)
- Sources: IUHoosiers.com

Game information

First quarter

- (10:05) MARY – Joseph Petrino 29-yard field goal (Drive: 10 plays, 60 yards, 4:55; Maryland 3–0)
- (2:50) MARY – Joseph Petrino 31-yard field goal (Drive: 12 plays, 74 yards, 5:39; Maryland 6–0)

Second quarter

- (12:30) IU – Peyton Ramsey 35-yard run, Logan Justus kick (Drive: 6 plays, 90 yards, 1:36; Indiana 7–6)
- (10:07) IU – Donavan Hale 37-yard pass from Peyton Ramsey, Logan Justus kick (Drive: 3 plays, 64 yards, 0:52; Indiana 14–6)
- (8:11) IU – Stevie Scott III 2-yard run, Logan Justus kick (Drive: 5 plays, 36 yards, 1:15; Indiana 21–6)
- (3:04) MARY – Tayon Fleet-Davis 3-yard run (Drive: 10 plays, 75 yards, 5:07; Indiana 21–12)
- (0:07) MARY – Joseph Petrino 31-yard field goal (Drive: 7 plays, 41 yards, 2:28; Indiana 21–15)

Third quarter

- (11:26) IU – Nick Westbrook-Ikhine 19-yard pass from Peyton Ramsey, Logan Justus kick (Drive: 9 plays, 81 yards, 3:34; Indiana 28–15)
- (7:05) IU – Logan Justus 23-yard field goal (Drive: 8 plays, 56 yards, 1:52; Indiana 31–15)
- (6:45) MARY – Javon Leake 27-yard run, Anthony McFarland Jr. two-point run (Drive: 2 plays, 27 yards, 0:20; Indiana 31–23)

Fourth quarter

- (12:25) MARY – Joseph Petrino 39-yard field goal (Drive: 10 plays, 38 yards, 4:34; Indiana 31–26)
- (4:54) MARY – Jeshaun Jones 15-yard pass from Tyrrell Pigrome (Drive: 9 plays, 88 yards, 5:20; Maryland 32–31)
- (2:32) IU – Logan Justus 42-yard field goal (Drive: 5 plays, 36 yards, 2:22; Indiana 34–32)

Statistics	MARY	IU
First downs	27	18
Total yards	542	374
Rushes/yards	59–353	30–131
Passing yards	189	243
Passing: Comp–Att–Int	14–25–1	16–28–1
Time of possession	39:18	20:42

Team	Category	Player	Statistics
Maryland	Passing	Tyrrell Pigrome	10/13, 146 yards, TD
Maryland	Rushing	Anthony McFarland Jr.	29 carries, 210 yards
Maryland	Receiving	Dontay Demus Jr.	4 receptions, 98 yards
Indiana	Passing	Peyton Ramsey	16/28, 243 yards, 2 TD, INT
Indiana	Rushing	Stevie Scott III	19 carries, 103 yards, TD
Indiana	Receiving	Donavan Hale	3 receptions, 92 yards, TD

=== At No. 4 Michigan ===
Indiana Hoosiers (5–5) at No. 4 Michigan Wolverines (9–1) – Game summary

Quarter	1	2	3	4	Total
Hoosiers	7	10	0	3	20
Wolverines	3	12	10	6	31

at Michigan Stadium • Ann Arbor, Michigan

- Date: November 17, 2018
- Game time: 4:00 p.m.
- Game weather: Snowy, 36 °F (2 °C)
- Game attendance: 110,118
- Referee: John O'Neill
- TV announcers (FS1): Gus Johnson (play-by-play), Joel Klatt (analyst)
- Sources: IUHoosiers.com

Game information

First quarter

- (10:41) MICH – Jake Moody 32-yard field goal (Drive: 10 plays, 61 yards, 4:19; Michigan 3–0)
- (4:14) IU – Stevie Scott III 13-yard run, Logan Justus kick (Drive: 6 plays, 80 yards, 1:37; Indiana 7–3)

Second quarter

- (14:15) MICH – Jake Moody 30-yard field goal (Drive: 10 plays, 52 yards, 4:59; Indiana 7–6)
- (9:56) MICH – Jake Moody 31-yard field goal (Drive: 8 plays, 47 yards, 2:26; Michigan 9–6)
- (7:39) IU – Logan Justus 41-yard field goal (Drive: 7 plays, 52 yards, 2:17; Indiana 10–9)
- (4:46) MICH – Nick Eubanks 41-yard pass from Shea Patterson (Drive: 6 plays, 65 yards, 2:53; Michigan 15–10)
- (1:33) IU – Ty Fryfogle 7-yard pass from Peyton Ramsey, Logan Justus kick (Drive: 9 plays, 75 yards, 3:13; Indiana 17–15)

Third quarter

- (9:44) MICH – Karan Higdon 2-yard run, Jake Moody kick (Drive: 11 plays, 67 yards, 4:41; Michigan 22–17)
- (2:08) MICH – Jake Moody 33-yard field goal (Drive: 9 plays, 65 yards, 3:07; Michigan 25–17)

Fourth quarter

- (9:55) MICH – Jake Moody 23-yard field goal (Drive: 9 plays, 51 yards, 4:53; Michigan 28–17)
- (6:10) IU – Logan Justus 36-yard field goal (Drive: 10 plays, 56 yards, 3:45; Michigan 28–20)
- (2:37) MICH – Jake Moody 29-yard field goal (Drive: 8 plays, 36 yards, 3:33; Michigan 31–20)

Statistics	IU	MICH
First downs	21	25
Total yards	385	507
Rushes/yards	40–190	50–257
Passing yards	195	250
Passing: Comp–Att–Int	16–35–1	16–28–1
Time of possession	24:06	35:54

Team	Category	Player	Statistics
Indiana	Passing	Peyton Ramsey	16/35, 195 yards, TD, INT
Indiana	Rushing	Stevie Scott III	30 carries, 139 yards, TD
Indiana	Receiving	Nick Westbrook-Ikhine	4 receptions, 84 yards
Michigan	Passing	Shea Patterson	16/28, 250 yards, TD, INT
Michigan	Rushing	Karan Higdon	21 carries, 101 yards, TD
Michigan	Receiving	Zach Gentry	2 receptions, 83 yards

=== vs Purdue ===
Purdue Boilermakers (5–6) vs Indiana Hoosiers (5–6) – Game summary

Quarter	1	2	3	4	Total
Boilermakers	7	7	7	7	28
Hoosiers	0	7	0	14	21

at Memorial Stadium • Bloomington, Indiana

- Date: November 24, 2018
- Game time: 12:00 p.m.
- Game weather: Cloudy, 52 °F (11 °C)
- Game attendance: 48,247
- Referee: Jerry McGinn
- TV announcers (ESPN2): Mark Neely (play-by-play), John Congemi (analyst)
- Sources: IUHoosiers.com

Game information

First quarter

- (5:43) PUR – Isaac Zico 11-yard pass from David Blough, Spencer Evans kick (Drive: 12 plays, 85 yards, 4:36; Purdue 7–0)

Second quarter

- (10:52) IU – Stevie Scott III 8-yard run, Logan Justus kick (Drive: 14 plays, 87 yards, 5:32; Tied 7–7)
- (4:30) PUR – Rondale Moore 56-yard pass from David Blough, Spencer Evans kick (Drive: 1 play, 56 yards, 0:10; Purdue 14–7)

Third quarter

- (3:43) PUR – Rondale Moore 33-yard pass from David Blough, Spencer Evans kick (Drive: 6 plays, 76 yards, 2:00; Purdue 21–7)

Fourth quarter

- (7:33) IU – Peyton Ramsey 23-yard run, Logan Justus kick (Drive: 8 plays, 79 yards, 2:23; Purdue 21–14)
- (3:48) PUR – Markell Jones 32-yard run, Spencer Evans kick (Drive: 6 plays, 75 yards, 3:45; Purdue 28–14)
- (1:17) IU – Nick Westbrook-Ikhine 40-yard run, Logan Justus kick (Drive: 7 plays, 90 yards, 1:11; Purdue 28–21)

Statistics	PUR	IU
First downs	26	27
Total yards	440	487
Rushes/yards	34–130	30–142
Passing yards	310	345
Passing: Comp–Att–Int	27–35–1	36–51–1
Time of possession	31:45	28:15

Team	Category	Player	Statistics
Purdue	Passing	David Blough	27/35, 310 yards, 3 TD, INT
Purdue	Rushing	Markell Jones	11 carries, 95 yards, TD
Purdue	Receiving	Rondale Moore	12 receptions, 141 yards, 2 TD
Indiana	Passing	Peyton Ramsey	36/51, 345 yards, TD, INT
Indiana	Rushing	Stevie Scott III	20 carries, 104 yards, TD
Indiana	Receiving	Nick Westbrook-Ikhine	8 receptions, 125 yards, TD

== Roster ==
2018 Indiana Hoosiers football team roster
Players
Coaches
Offense

Pos.	#	Name	Class
ATH	2	Reese Taylor	Fr
WR	3	Ty Fryfogle	So
RB	4	Morgan Ellison	So
WR	6	Donavan Hale	Jr
WR	5	J-Shun Harris II	Sr
QB	8	Johnny Pabst	Fr
QB	9	Michael Penix Jr.	Fr
QB	12	Peyton Ramsey	So
WR	15	Nick Westbrook-Ikhine	Jr
WR	16	David Felton	Fr
WR	17	Justin Berry	So
WR	19	Luke Shayotovich	Fr
RB	20	Cole Gest	So
RB	21	Stevie Scott	Fr
WR	22	Whop Philyor	So
RB	23	Ronnie Walker Jr.	Fr
RB	24	Mike Majette	Sr
WR	25	Luke Timian	Sr
RB	28	Kristian Pechac	Fr
RB	29	Craig Nelson	Fr
WR	30	Bradley Ellis	Fr
RB	33	Ricky Brookins	Sr
RB	37	Ahrod Lloyd	Fr
RB	38	Connor Thomas	So
WR	39	Chris Gajcak	Jr
OL	50	Nick Linder	Sr
OL	51	Mackenzie Nworah	So
OL	52	DaVondre Love	Jr
OL	54	Coy Cronk	Jr
OL	57	Harry Crider	So
OL	61	Nick Ramacca	Jr
OL	62	Brandon Knight	Sr
OL	64	Ryan Smith	Fr
OL	65	Dominic Altimari	Fr
OL	66	Aidan Rafferty	Fr
OL	68	Hunter Littlejohn	Jr
OL	70	Zenden Dellinger	Fr
OL	71	Delroy Baker	Sr
OL	72	Simon Stepaniak	Jr
OL	74	Nick Marozas	Fr
OL	75	Tommy Greene	Fr
OL	76	Wes Martin	Sr
OL	77	Caleb Jones	Fr
OL	78	Britt Beery	Fr
OL	79	Charlie O'Connor	Fr
WR	80	Miles Marshall	Fr
WR	82	Jacolby Hewitt	Fr
TE	83	Austin Dorris	Jr
TE	84	TJ Ivy	Fr
TE	85	Ryan Watercutter	Sr
TE	86	Peyton Hendershot	Fr
TE	88	Shaun Bonner	So
TE	89	Matt Bjorson	Fr

Defense

Pos.	#	Name	Class
DB	1	Juwan Burgess	Fr
DL	6	James Head Jr.	Fr
LB	7	Reakwon Jones	Jr
LB	8	James Miller	Fr
DB	9	Jonathan Crawford	Sr
DB	10	Elijah Rodgers	Fr
DB	13	Isaac James	Jr
DB	14	Andre Brown Jr.	Jr
DB	16	Jamar Johnson	Fr
DB	17	Raheem Layne	So
DL	18	Jonathan King	Fr
DB	19	Noah Pierre	Fr
DB	23	Jaylin Williams	Fr
DB	24	Owen Strieter	Fr
DB	25	Devon Matthews	Fr
DB	28	A’Shon Riggins	Jr
DB	29	Khalil Bryant	Jr
DB	30	Jordan Jusevitch	Fr
DB	31	Bryant Fitzgerald	Fr
DB	33	Jordan Peterson	So
LB	34	Cam Jones	Fr
LB	35	Nile Sykes	Sr
LB	41	Mo Burnam	Fr
DB	42	Marcelino McCrary-Ball	So
LB	43	Dameon Willis Jr.	Sr
LB	44	Thomas Allen	Fr
LB	45	T.D. Roof	So
LB	46	Aaron Casey	Fr
DB	46	Sam Slusher	Fr
LB	47	Micah McFadden	Fr
DL	49	Madison Norris	Fr
DL	50	Nick Linder	Sr
DL	51	Mike Barwick Jr.	Sr
DL	52	Kayton Samuels	Sr
LB	53	Andrew Stamm	So
DL	54	Ja’Merez Bowen	Sr
LB	55	Michael McGinnis	Sr
DL	58	Jake Ostrowski	Fr
DL	59	Gavin McCabe	Fr
DL	69	Gavin Everett	Jr
DL	87	Michael Ziemba	So
DL	90	Connor Schneider	Fr
DL	91	Jocob Robinson	Sr
DL	92	Alfred Bryant	Fr
DL	95	Brandon Wilson	Jr
DL	96	Shamar Jones	Fr
DL	97	Tramar Reece	Fr
DL	98	Jerome Johnson	So
DL	99	Allen Stallings IV	Jr

Special teams

Pos.	#	Name	Class
P	36	Drew Conard	Fr
LS	60	Jacob Limbach	So
K	82	Logan Justus	Jr
K	87	Jack Cardillo	Fr
K	90	Jared Smolar	So
K	93	Charles Campbell	Fr
P	94	Haydon Whitehead	Jr
LS	97	Dan Godsil	Sr

Head coach

- Tom Allen

Coordinators/assistant coaches

- Mike DeBord (associate head coach / oc / te)
- Mark Hagen (assistant defensive coordinator / dl)
- Mike Hart (RBs)
- Grant Heard (passing game coordinator / OL)
- Darren Hiller (run game coordinator / ol)
- William Inge (special teams coordinator)
- Brandon Shelby (CBs)
- Nick Sheridan (QBs)
- Kasey Teegardin (safeties)
- Kane Wommack (linebackers)
- David Ballou (director of athletic performance)
- Dr. Matt Rhea (athletic performance coach)
- Matt Clapp (athletic performance coach)
- Paul Constantine (athletic performance coach)
- Rick Danison II (director of athletic performance – Wilkinson Performance Center)
- Billy Cosh (graduate assistant - offense)
- Pat Kuntz (graduate assistant - defense)
- Jim Nelson (graduate assistant - defense)
- Jeff McInerney (quality control – special teams)
- Ryan McInerney (quality control - defense)
- Sean Fisher (quality control - offense)
- Matt Wilson (senior director of recruiting)
- Bruce Johnson (Assistant AD – director of on-campus recruiting)
- Scott Gasper (director of player personnel)
- Mike Doig (director of operations)
- Mike Pechac (director of player development and academic enhancement)

Legend

- (C) Team captain
- (S) Suspended
- (I) Ineligible
- Injured
- Redshirt

Roster
Last update: August 3, 2018

== Awards and honors ==
=== Award watch lists ===
Listed in the order that they were released

Award	Player	Position	Year	Date Awarded	Ref
Fred Biletnikoff Award	Nick Westbrook-Ikhine	WR	JR	July 19, 2018	
Wuerffel Trophy	Ricky Brookins	RB	SR	July 26, 2018	
Ray Guy Award	Haydon Whitehead	P	Junior (Redshirt)	August 13, 2018	
Earl Campbell Tyler Rose Award	Luke Timian	WR	Senior (Redshirt)	August 14, 2018	
William V. Campbell Trophy (semi-finalist)	Wes Martin	OL	Senior (Redshirt)	September 26, 2018	
Lou Groza Award (semifinalist)	Logan Justus	K	Junior (Redshirt)	November 1, 2018	

=== Players of the Week ===
Big Ten Weekly Awards
Player	Award	Date Awarded	Ref.
Stevie Scott	Big Ten Co-Freshmen of the Week	September 10, 2018	
J-Shun Harris II	Big Ten Special Teams Players of the Week	September 17, 2018	
Stevie Scott	Big Ten Freshman of the Week	September 17, 2018	
Logan Justus	Big Ten Special Teams Player of the Week	November 12, 2018	

=== B1G Conference awards ===
Awards
Player	Award	Date Awarded	Ref.
Logan Justus	Second Team All-Big Ten Special Teams	November 27, 2018	

== Radio ==
Radio coverage for all games will be broadcast on IUHoosiers.com All-Access and on various radio frequencies throughout the state. The primary radio announcer is long-time broadcaster Don Fischer with Play-by-Play.

== After the season ==
=== Season summary ===
Indiana started the year with three consecutive victories against non-conference opponents FIU, Virginia, and Ball State. In Big Ten Conference play, the team secured victories against Rutgers and Maryland. In the last game of the season, with bowl eligibility on the line, Indiana fell to in-state rivals Purdue 21–28 to finish in sixth in the East Division with a final record of 5–7, 2–7 in conference play.

The Hoosiers were led offensively by quarterback Peyton Ramsey, who finished in fourth in the Big Ten Conference with 2,875 passing yards and 19 touchdowns. Running back Stevie Scott was fifth in the conference with 1,137 rushing yards and 10 touchdowns. Kicker Logan Justus was the team's sole all-conference selection, chosen to the second team by the coaches after finishing in second in the conference in field goal percentage.

=== 2019 NFL draft ===
Round	Pick	Player	Position	NFL Club
4	131	Wes Martin	G	Washington Redskins
