= 2017 Indiana Hoosiers football team =

American college football season

2017 Indiana Hoosiers football
- Conference: Big Ten Conference
- East Division
- Record: 5–7 (2–7 Big Ten)
- Head coach: Tom Allen (1st season)
- Offensive coordinator: Mike DeBord (1st season)
- Offensive scheme: Multiple
- Defensive coordinator: Mark Hagen (1st season)
- Base defense: 4–2–5
- MVP: Tegray Scales
- Captains: Greg Gooch; Richard Lagow; Wes Martin; Tegray Scales
- Home stadium: Memorial Stadium

2017 Big Ten Conference football standings
	Conf.			Overall
Team	W		L	W		L
East Division
No. 5 Ohio State xy$	8	–	1	12	–	2
No. 15 Michigan State	7	–	2	10	–	3
No. 8 Penn State	7	–	2	11	–	2
Michigan	5	–	4	8	–	5
Rutgers	3	–	6	4	–	8
Indiana	2	–	7	5	–	7
Maryland	2	–	7	4	–	8
West Division
No. 7 Wisconsin xy	9	–	0	13	–	1
No. 17 Northwestern	7	–	2	10	–	3
Iowa	4	–	5	8	–	5
Purdue	4	–	5	7	–	6
Nebraska	3	–	6	4	–	8
Minnesota	2	–	7	5	–	7
Illinois	0	–	9	2	–	10
Championship: Ohio State 27, Wisconsin 21
$ – Conference champion; x – Division champion/co-champions; y – Championship game participant; Rankings from AP Poll

The 2017 Indiana Hoosiers football team represented Indiana University in the 2017 NCAA Division I FBS football season. The Hoosiers played their home games at Memorial Stadium in Bloomington, Indiana. Indiana competed as a member of the East Division of the Big Ten Conference. The team was led by first-year head coach Tom Allen and finished 5–7 overall, 2–7 in Big Ten play to finish in a tie for sixth place in the East Division.

== Spring Game ==
The 2017 Spring Game took place in Bloomington, on April 13, at 7:00 p.m.

Date	Time	Spring Game	Site	TV	Result	Attendance
April 13	7:00 p.m.	Cream vs. Crimson	Memorial Stadium • Bloomington, IN	BTN	Crimson 42–36^{OT}	-

== Offseason ==
Following the season, the Hoosiers would fire sixth-year Offensive Coordinator Kevin Johns on January 2, 2017, and hire Tennessee Offensive Coordinator Mike DeBord two days later. On January 4, 2017, Grant Heard joined the Hoosiers' coaching staff as the wide receivers coach. He formerly coached at Ole Miss. On March 3, 2017, Mike Hart was hired to fill the vacant role of running backs' coach. Hart was a former running backs coach at Syracuse, Western Michigan and Eastern Michigan, as well as a former running back for the Indianapolis Colts.

=== Departures ===
Notable departures from the 2016 squad included:

Name	Number	Pos.	Height	Weight	Year	Hometown	Notes
Dimtric Camiel	#77	OL	6'7"	310	Senior	Houston, TX	Declared for the 2017 NFL Draft
Dan Feeney	#67	OL	6'4"	310	Senior	Orland Park, IL	Declared for the 2017 NFL Draft
Marcus Oliver	#44	LB	6'1"	240	Junior	Hamilton, OH	Declared for the 2017 NFL Draft
Mitchell Paige	#87	WR	5'7"	176	Senior	Carmel, IN	Graduated
Devine Redding	#34	RB	5'10"	202	Junior	Youngstown, OH	Declared for the 2017 NFL Draft

=== 2017 NFL draft ===
Hoosiers who were picked in the 2017 NFL draft:

Round	Pick	Player	Position	Team
3	71	Dan Feeney	OL	Los Angeles Chargers
UFA		Dimitric Camiel	OT	Houston Texans
UFA		Marcus Oliver	LB	Philadelphia Eagles
UFA		Mitchell Paige	WR	Los Angeles Chargers
UFA		Devine Redding	RB	Kansas City Chiefs

== Preseason ==
=== Recruits ===
The Hoosiers signed a total of 23 recruits.

College recruiting (2017)
Name	Hometown	School	Height	Weight	Commit date
Tyler Knight; OT	Saint Petersburg, Florida	Northside Christian School	6 ft 5 in (1.96 m)	275 lb (125 kg)	Nov 23, 2015
Tyler Knight; OT	Recruit ratings: Scout: Rivals: 247Sports: ESPN:				
Bryant Fitzgerald; RB/LB	Avon, Indiana	Avon HS	6 ft 0 in (1.83 m)	200 lb (91 kg)	Jan 23, 2016
Bryant Fitzgerald; RB/LB	Recruit ratings: Scout: Rivals: 247Sports: ESPN:				
Britt Beery; DE	Carmel, Indiana	Carmel HS	6 ft 6 in (1.98 m)	250 lb (110 kg)	Mar 6, 2016
Britt Beery; DE	Recruit ratings: Scout: Rivals: 247Sports: ESPN:				
Thomas Allen; LB	Tampa, Florida	Plant HS	6 ft 3 in (1.91 m)	220 lb (100 kg)	Jun 1, 2016
Thomas Allen; LB	Recruit ratings: Scout: Rivals: 247Sports: ESPN:				
Tramar Reece; DE	Clearwater, Florida	Clearwater HS	6 ft 3 in (1.91 m)	210 lb (95 kg)	Jun 19, 2016
Tramar Reece; DE	Recruit ratings: Scout: Rivals: 247Sports: ESPN:				
LeShaun Minor; DT	Indianapolis, Indiana	Ben Davis HS	6 ft 3 in (1.91 m)	293 lb (133 kg)	Jun 20, 2016
LeShaun Minor; DT	Recruit ratings: Scout: Rivals: 247Sports: ESPN:				
Alfred Bryant; DE	Manvel, Texas	Manvel HS	6 ft 2 in (1.88 m)	236 lb (107 kg)	Jul 2, 2016
Alfred Bryant; DE	Recruit ratings: Scout: Rivals: 247Sports: ESPN:				
Peyton Hendershot; TE	North Salem, Indiana	Tri-West HS	6 ft 4 in (1.93 m)	227 lb (103 kg)	Jul 12, 2016
Peyton Hendershot; TE	Recruit ratings: Scout: Rivals: 247Sports: ESPN:				
LaDamion Hunt; CB	Carrollton, Georgia	Carrollton HS	6 ft 0 in (1.83 m)	183 lb (83 kg)	Jul 21, 2016
LaDamion Hunt; CB	Recruit ratings: Scout: Rivals: 247Sports: ESPN:				
Michael Ziemba; TE	Lake Mary, Florida	Lake Mary HS	6 ft 3 in (1.91 m)	245 lb (111 kg)	Aug 1, 2016
Michael Ziemba; TE	Recruit ratings: Scout: Rivals: 247Sports: ESPN:				
Caleb Jones; OT	Indianapolis, Indiana	Lawrence North HS	6 ft 9 in (2.06 m)	380 lb (170 kg)	Aug 2, 2016
Caleb Jones; OT	Recruit ratings: Scout: Rivals: 247Sports: ESPN:				
Harry Crider; C	Columbus, Indiana	Columbus East HS	6 ft 4 in (1.93 m)	260 lb (120 kg)	Aug 15, 2016
Harry Crider; C	Recruit ratings: Scout: Rivals: 247Sports: ESPN:				
Juan Harris; DT	Janesville, Wisconsin	Parker HS	6 ft 4 in (1.93 m)	368 lb (167 kg)	Nov 24, 2016
Juan Harris; DT	Recruit ratings: Scout: Rivals: 247Sports: ESPN:				
Haydon Whitehead; P	Melbourne, Australia	McKinnon Secondary College	6 ft 2 in (1.88 m)	195 lb (88 kg)	Dec 8, 2016
Haydon Whitehead; P	Recruit ratings: Scout: Rivals: 247Sports: ESPN:				
Mike McGinnis; LB	Allentown, New Jersey	Allentown HS/ASA College	6 ft 2 in (1.88 m)	235 lb (107 kg)	Dec 18, 2016
Mike McGinnis; LB	Recruit ratings: Scout: Rivals: 247Sports: ESPN:				
Mo Burnham; LB	Conyers, Georgia	Salem HS	6 ft 2 in (1.88 m)	219 lb (99 kg)	Dec 25, 2016
Mo Burnham; LB	Recruit ratings: Scout: Rivals: 247Sports: ESPN:				
Ty Fryfogle; WR	Lucedale, Mississippi	George County HS	6 ft 2 in (1.88 m)	206 lb (93 kg)	Jan 17, 2017
Ty Fryfogle; WR	Recruit ratings: Scout: Rivals: 247Sports: ESPN:				
Whop Philyor; WR	Tampa, Florida	Plant HS	6 ft 0 in (1.83 m)	175 lb (79 kg)	Jan 18, 2017
Whop Philyor; WR	Recruit ratings: Scout: Rivals: 247Sports: ESPN:				
Juwan Burgess; WR/S	Tampa, Florida	Plant HS	6 ft 0 in (1.83 m)	185 lb (84 kg)	Jan 20, 2017
Juwan Burgess; WR/S	Recruit ratings: Scout: Rivals: 247Sports: ESPN:				
Craig Nelson; RB	Miami, Florida	Booker T. Washington HS	5 ft 10 in (1.78 m)	180 lb (82 kg)	Jan 22, 2017
Craig Nelson; RB	Recruit ratings: Scout: Rivals: 247Sports: ESPN:				
Nick Tronti; QB	Ponte Vedra Beach, Florida	Ponte Vedra HS	6 ft 2 in (1.88 m)	210 lb (95 kg)	Jan 24, 2017
Nick Tronti; QB	Recruit ratings: Scout: Rivals: 247Sports: ESPN:				
Raheem Layne; CB	DeLand, Florida	Sebastian River HS	6 ft 0 in (1.83 m)	178 lb (81 kg)	Jan 30, 2017
Raheem Layne; CB	Recruit ratings: Scout: Rivals: 247Sports: ESPN:				
Morgan Ellison; RB	Pickerington, Ohio	Pickerington Central HS	6 ft 1 in (1.85 m)	227 lb (103 kg)	Feb 1, 2017
Morgan Ellison; RB	Recruit ratings: Scout: Rivals: 247Sports: ESPN:				
Overall recruit ranking:
Note: In many cases, Scout, Rivals, 247Sports, On3, and ESPN may conflict in their listings of height and weight.; In these cases, the average was taken. ESPN grades are on a 100-point scale.; Sources: "Indiana Football Commitments". Rivals.; "2017 Indiana Football Commits". Scout.; "ESPN". ESPN.; "Scout.com Team Recruiting Rankings". Scout.; "2017 Team Ranking". Rivals.com.

=== Returning starters ===
Indiana had seven returning players on offense, nine on defense and two on special teams that started games in 2016.

==== Offense ====
Player	Class	Position
Richard Lagow	Senior	Quarterback
Simmie Cobbs	Junior	Wide Receiver
Nick Westbrook-Ikhine	Junior	Wide Receiver
Danny Friend	Senior	Tight End
Coy Cronk	Sophomore	Offensive Line
Brandon Knight	Junior	Offensive Line
Wes Martin	Junior	Offensive Line

==== Defense ====
Player	Class	Position
Greg Gooch	Senior	Defensive Line
Nate Hoff	Senior	Defensive Line
Jacob Robinson	Junior	Defensive Line
Tegray Scales	Senior	Linebacker
Marcelino McCrary-Ball	Sophomore	Defensive Back
Jonathan Crawford	Junior	Defensive Back
Rashard Fant	Senior	Defensive Back
Tony Fields	Senior	Defensive Back
A'Shon Riggins	Sophomore	Defensive Back

==== Special teams ====
Player	Class	Position
Griffin Oakes	Senior	Kicker
Joseph Gedeon	Junior	Punter

== Schedule ==
The Hoosiers' 2017 schedule consisted of 6 home games and 6 away games. The Hoosiers first non-conference game were away at Virginia of the Atlantic Coast Conference (ACC), before hosting the remaining two non-conference games; against FIU from Conference USA (C-USA) and against Georgia Southern of the Sun Belt Conference (Sun Belt).

The Hoosiers played nine conference games; they hosted Ohio State, Michigan, Wisconsin, and Rutgers. They traveled to Penn State, Michigan State, Maryland, Illinois, and Purdue.

Date	Time	Opponent	Site	TV	Result	Attendance
August 31	8:00 p.m.	No. 2 Ohio State	Memorial Stadium; Bloomington, IN (College GameDay^{[1]})	ESPN	L 21–49	52,929
September 9	3:30 p.m.	at Virginia*	Scott Stadium; Charlottesville, VA	ESPNU	W 34–17	38,993
September 16		FIU*	Memorial Stadium; Bloomington, IN		Canceled^{[2]}	
September 23	3:30 p.m.	Georgia Southern*	Memorial Stadium; Bloomington, IN	BTN	W 52–17	42,886
September 30	3:30 p.m.	at No. 4 Penn State	Beaver Stadium; University Park, PA	BTN	L 14–45	107,542
October 7	3:30 p.m.	Charleston Southern*	Memorial Stadium; Bloomington, IN	BTN	W 27–0	35,995
October 14	12:00 p.m.	No. 17 Michigan^{†}	Memorial Stadium; Bloomington, IN	ABC	L 20–27 ^{OT}	52,929
October 21	3:30 p.m.	at No. 18 Michigan State	Spartan Stadium; East Lansing, MI (rivalry)	ABC	L 9–17	74,111
October 28	3:30 p.m.	at Maryland	Maryland Stadium; College Park, MD	BTN	L 39–42	35,144
November 4	12:00 p.m.	No. 4 Wisconsin	Memorial Stadium; Bloomington, IN	ABC	L 17–45	43,027
November 11	12:00 p.m.	at Illinois	Memorial Stadium; Champaign, IL (rivalry)	BTN	W 24–14	40,195
November 18	12:00 p.m.	Rutgers	Memorial Stadium; Bloomington, IN	BTN	W 41–0	35,949
November 25	12:00 p.m.	at Purdue	Ross–Ade Stadium; West Lafayette, IN (Old Oaken Bucket)	ESPN2	L 24–31	52,105
*Non-conference game; ^{†}Homecoming; Rankings from AP Poll released prior to the game; All times are in Eastern time

- ^{^[1]} ESPN's College GameDay was held in Bloomington for the first time in the show's broadcast history.

^{^[2]}The game between FIU and Indiana, originally scheduled for September 16, was cancelled due to Hurricane Irma. The cancelled game served as Indiana's bye week and a replacement game was added on October 7 against Charleston Southern.

== Game summaries ==
=== vs No. 2 Ohio State ===
No. 2 Ohio State Buckeyes (0–0) vs Indiana Hoosiers (0–0) – Game summary

Quarter	1	2	3	4	Total
No. 2 Buckeyes	3	10	22	14	49
Hoosiers	7	7	7	0	21

at Memorial Stadium • Bloomington, Indiana

- Date: August 31, 2017
- Game time: 8:00 p.m.
- Game weather: Partly cloudy, 64 °F (18 °C)
- Game attendance: 52,929
- Referee: Daniel Capron
- TV announcers (ESPN): Dave Flemming (play-by-play), Kirk Herbstreit (analyst), Laura Rutledge (sideline)
- Sources: IUHoosiers.com

Game information

First Quarter

- (10:27) OSU – Sean Nuernberger 27-yard field goal (Drive: 11 plays, 66 yards, 4:33; Ohio State 3–0)
- (6:46) IU – Ian Thomas 18-yard pass from Richard Lagow, Griffin Oakes kick (Drive: 11 plays, 87 yards, 2:37; Indiana 7–3)

Second Quarter

- (10:15) OSU – Sean Nuernberger 19-yard field goal (Drive: 5 plays, 58 yards, 1:11; Indiana 7–6)
- (8:12) IU – Simmie Cobbs 8-yard pass from Richard Lagow, Griffin Oakes kick (Drive: 10 plays, 80 yards, 2:03; Indiana 14–6)
- (5:17) OSU – Antonio Williams 1-yard run, Sean Nuernberger kick (Drive: 9 plays, 75 yards, 2:55; Indiana 14–13)

Third Quarter

- (6:57) OSU – J. T. Barrett 2-yard run, Sean Nuernberger kick (Drive: 13 plays, 85 yards, 4:19; Ohio State 20–14)
- (4:46) IU – Ian Thomas 2-yard pass from Richard Lagow, Griffin Oakes kick (Drive: 9 plays, 62 yards, 2:01; Indiana 21–20)
- (4:38) OSU – Parris Campbell 74-yard pass from J. T. Barrett, Sean Nuernberger kick (Drive: 1 play, 74 yards, 0:18; Ohio State 27–21)
- (1:47) OSU – Johnnie Dixon 59-yard pass from J. T. Barrett, J. T. Barrett two-point run (Drive: 5 plays, 75 yards, 1:53; Ohio State 35–21)

Fourth Quarter

- (12:08) OSU – Binjimen Victor 11-yard pass from J. T. Barrett, Sean Nuernberger kick (Drive: 1 play, 11 yards, 0:04; Ohio State 42–21)
- (3:55) OSU – Antonio Williams -yard run, Sean Nuernberger kick (Drive: 13 plays, 87 yards, 6:16; Ohio State 49–21)

Statistics	OSU	IU
First downs	26	25
Total yards	596	437
Rushes/yards	51–292	27–17
Passing yards	304	420
Passing: Comp–Att–Int	20–35–0	42–68–2
Time of possession	31:50	28:10

Team	Category	Player	Statistics
Ohio State	Passing	J. T. Barrett	20/35, 304 yards, 3 TD
Ohio State	Rushing	J. K. Dobbins	29 carries, 181 yards
Ohio State	Receiving	Parris Campbell	6 receptions, 136 yards, TD
Indiana	Passing	Richard Lagow	40/65, 410 yards, 3 TD, 2 INT
Indiana	Rushing	Morgan Ellison	7 carries, 24 yards
Indiana	Receiving	Simmie Cobbs	11 receptions, 149 yards, TD

=== At Virginia ===
Indiana Hoosiers (0–1) at Virginia Cavaliers (1–0) – Game summary

Quarter	1	2	3	4	Total
Hoosiers	0	17	10	7	34
Cavaliers	0	3	7	7	17

at Scott Stadium • Charlottesville, Virginia

- Date: September 9, 2017
- Game time: 3:35 p.m.
- Game weather: Partly sunny; 70 °F (21 °C)
- Game attendance: 38,993
- Referee: Michael Cannon
- TV announcers (ESPNU): Dave Weekley (play-by-play), John Gregory (analyst)
- Sources: IUHoosiers.com

Game information

First Quarter

None

Second Quarter

- (8:08) UVA – A. J. Mejia 22-yard field goal (Drive: 7 plays, 20 yards, 2:44; Virginia 3–0)
- (6:16) IU – Simmie Cobbs 29-yard pass from Peyton Ramsey, Griffin Oakes kick (Drive: 6 plays, 59 yards, 1:52; Indiana 7–3)
- (3:31) IU – Peyton Ramsey 26-yard run, Griffin Oakes kick (Drive: 4 plays, 30 yards, 1:12; Indiana 14–3)
- (0:00) IU – Griffin Oakes 51-yard field goal (Drive: 6 plays, 12 yards, 1:35; Indiana 17–3)

Third Quarter

- (10:30) UVA – Jordan Ellis 12-yard run, A. J. Mejia kick (Drive: 8 plays, 55 yards, 2:38; Indiana 17–10)
- (7:32) IU – Griffin Oakes 48-yard field goal (Drive: 8 plays, 45 yards, 2:58; Indiana 20–10)
- (0:53) IU – Donavan Hale 32-yard pass from Peyton Ramsey, Griffin Oakes kick (Drive: 1 play, 32 yards, 0:07; Indiana 27–10)

Fourth Quarter

- (12:45) UVA – Joe Reed 7-yard pass from Kurt Benkert, A. J. Mejia kick (Drive: 10 plays, 75 yards, 3:08; Indiana 27–17)
- (5:56) IU – J-Shun Harris 44-yard punt return, Griffin Oakes kick (Drive: 3 plays, 1 yard, 1:07; Indiana 34–17)

Statistics	IU	UVA
First downs	19	22
Total yards	308	314
Rushes/yards	41–111	25–55
Passing yards	197	259
Passing: Comp–Att–Int	19–30–1	39–66–0
Time of possession	25:07	34:53

Team	Category	Player	Statistics
Indiana	Passing	Peyton Ramsey	16/20, 173 yards, 2 TD
Indiana	Rushing	Morgan Ellison	12 carries, 47 yards
Indiana	Receiving	Simmie Cobbs	5 receptions, 62 yards, TD
Virginia	Passing	Kurt Benkert	39/66, 259 yards, TD
Virginia	Rushing	Jordan Ellis	14 carries, 44 yards, TD
Virginia	Receiving	Olamide Zaccheaus	12 receptions, 72 yards

=== vs Georgia Southern ===
Georgia Southern Eagles (0–2) vs Indiana Hoosiers (1–1) – Game summary

Quarter	1	2	3	4	Total
Eagles	0	7	10	0	17
Hoosiers	21	10	14	7	52

at Memorial Stadium • Bloomington, Indiana

- Date: September 23, 2017
- Game time: 3:40 p.m.
- Game weather: Sunny, 90 °F (32 °C)
- Game attendance: 42,886
- Referee: Don Willard
- TV announcers (BTN): Lisa Byington (play-by-play), Jeremy Leman (analyst)
- Sources: IUHoosiers.com

Game information

First Quarter

- (8:54) IU – Morgan Ellison 2-yard run, Griffin Oakes kick (Drive: 10 plays, 73 yards, 2:25; Indiana 7–0)
- (6:27) IU – J-Shun Harris 70-yard punt return, Griffin Oakes kick (Drive: 3 plays, 5 yards, 2:27; Indiana 14–0)
- (4:56) IU – Simmie Cobbs 0-yard fumble recovery, Griffin Oakes kick (Drive: 5 plays, 46 yards, 0:56; Indiana 21–0)

Second Quarter

- (14:14) IU – Griffin Oakes 27-yard field goal (Drive: 5 plays, 43 yards, 2:25; Indiana 24–0)
- (11:49) IU – Morgan Ellison 1-yard run, Griffin Oakes kick (Drive: 7 plays, 36 yards, 1:36; Indiana 31–0)
- (2:51) GASO – Ellis Richardson 23-yard pass from Shai Werts, Tyler Bass kick (Drive: 8 plays, 77 yards, 4:20; Indiana 31–7)

Third Quarter

- (14:21) IU – Ian Thomas 71-yard pass from Richard Lagow, Griffin Oakes kick (Drive: 3 plays, 75 yards, 0:39; Indiana 38–7)
- (10:42) IU – Devonte Williams 42-yard pass from Peyton Ramsey, Griffin Oakes kick (Drive: 5 plays, 80 yards, 1:24; Indiana 45–7)
- (9:38) GASO – D'Ondre Glenn 63-yard pass from Shai Werts, Tyler Bass kick (Drive: 3 plays, 75 yards, 1:04; Indiana 45–14)
- (3:46) GASO – Tyler Bass 32-yard field goal (Drive: 10 plays, 38 yards, 4:40; Indiana 45–17)

Fourth Quarter

- (2:19) IU – Andre Brown 22-yard fumble return, Griffin Oakes kick (Drive: 1 play, 4 yards, 0:10; Indiana 52–17)

Statistics	GASO	IU
First downs	15	20
Total yards	375	467
Rushes/yards	54–242	47–282
Passing yards	133	185
Passing: Comp–Att–Int	7–16–0	11–22–0
Time of possession	34:11	25:49

Team	Category	Player	Statistics
Georgia Southern	Passing	Shai Werts	6/14, 129 yards, 2 TD
Georgia Southern	Rushing	L. A. Ramsby	18 carries, 108 yards
Georgia Southern	Receiving	D'Ondre Glenn	3 receptions, 98 yards, TD
Indiana	Passing	Richard Lagow	8/13, 130 yards, TD
Indiana	Rushing	Morgan Ellison	25 carries, 186 yards, 2 TD
Indiana	Receiving	Ian Thomas	2 receptions, 79 yards, TD

=== At No. 4 Penn State ===
Indiana Hoosiers (2–1) at No. 4 Penn State Nittany Lions (4–0) – Game summary

Quarter	1	2	3	4	Total
Hoosiers	0	14	0	0	14
No. 4 Nittany Lions	28	0	10	7	45

at Beaver Stadium • University Park, Pennsylvania

- Date: September 30, 2017
- Game time: 3:40 p.m.
- Game weather: Partly sunny, 57 °F (14 °C)
- Game attendance: 107,542
- Referee: Jeff Servinsky
- TV announcers (BTN): Brandon Gaudin (play-by-play), Glen Mason (analyst), Elise Menaker (sideline)
- Sources: IUHoosiers.com

Game information

First Quarter

- (14:46) PSU – Saquon Barkley 98-yard kickoff return, Tyler Davis kick (Drive: 0 plays, 0 yards, 0:14; Penn State 7–0)
- (11:41) PSU – Trace McSorley 1-yard run, Tyler Davis kick (Drive: 6 plays, 39 yards, 2:45; Penn State 14–0)
- (6:34) PSU – Nick Scott 13-yard fumble return, Tyler Davis kick (Drive: 6 plays, 26 yards, 2:11; Penn State 21–0)
- (0:41) PSU – DaeSean Hamilton 8-yard pass from Trace McSorley, Tyler Davis kick (Drive: 9 plays, 73 yards, 4:28; Penn State 28–0)

Second Quarter

- (14:01) IU – Ricky Brookins 2-yard run, Griffin Oakes kick (Drive: 6 plays, 75 yards, 1:40; Penn State 28–7)
- (0:44) IU – Simmie Cobbs 18-yard pass from Peyton Ramsey, Griffin Oakes kick (Drive: 8 plays, 60 yards, 2:05; Penn State 28–14)

Third Quarter

- (5:50) PSU – Tyler Davis 45-yard field goal (Drive: 8 plays, 40 yards, 3:24; Penn State 31–14)
- (3:22) PSU – DaeSean Hamilton 24-yard pass from Trace McSorley, Tyler Davis kick (Drive: 4 plays, 52 yards, 1:36; Penn State 38–14)

Fourth Quarter

- (4:13) PSU – DaeSean Hamilton 16-yard pass from Saquon Barkley, Tyler Davis kick (Drive: 5 plays, 73 yards, 2:20; Penn State 45–14)

Statistics	IU	PSU
First downs	19	20
Total yards	352	370
Rushes/yards	47–177	37–39
Passing yards	175	331
Passing: Comp–Att–Int	15–32–1	24–37–1
Time of possession	26:31	33:29

Team	Category	Player	Statistics
Indiana	Passing	Richard Lagow	7/15, 97 yards
Indiana	Rushing	Peyton Ramsey	12 carries, 53 yards
Indiana	Receiving	Ian Thomas	5 receptions, 91 yards
Penn State	Passing	Trace McSorley	23/36, 315 yards, 2 TD, INT
Penn State	Rushing	Saquon Barkley	20 carries, 56 yards
Penn State	Receiving	DaeSean Hamilton	9 receptions, 122 yards, TD

=== vs Charleston Southern (FCS) ===
Charleston Southern Buccaneers (2–2) vs Indiana Hoosiers (2–2) – Game summary

Quarter	1	2	3	4	Total
Buccaneers	0	0	0	0	0
Hoosiers	10	14	3	0	27

at Memorial Stadium • Bloomington, Indiana

- Date: October 7, 2017
- Game time: 3:40 p.m.
- Game weather: Partly sunny, 81 °F (27 °C)
- Game attendance: 35,995
- Referee: Don Willard
- TV announcers (BTN): Chris Denari (play-by-play), Jeremy Leman (analyst)
- Sources: IUHoosiers.com

Game information

First Quarter

- (10:56) IU – Griffin Oakes 30-yard field goal (Drive: 8 plays, 33 yards, 2:35; Indiana 3–0)
- (3:26) IU – Taysir Mack 12-yard pass from Peyton Ramsey, Griffin Oakes kick (Drive: 5 plays, 32 yards, 1:23; Indiana 10–0)

Second Quarter

- (8:00) IU – Peyton Ramsey 0-yard fumble recovery, Griffin Oakes kick (Drive: 11 plays, 90 yards, 2:51; Indiana 17–0)
- (0:34) IU – Taysir Mack 45-yard pass from Peyton Ramsey, Griffin Oakes kick (Drive: 5 plays, 57 yards, 1:07; Indiana 24–0)

Third Quarter

- (7:04) IU – Griffin Oakes 21-yard field goal (Drive: 17 plays, 90 yards, 4:58; Indiana 27–0)

Fourth Quarter

None

Statistics	CHSO	IU
First downs	6	25
Total yards	134	478
Rushes/yards	44–134	45–157
Passing yards	0	321
Passing: Comp–Att–Int	0–10–0	32–41–1
Time of possession	29:16	30:44

Team	Category	Player	Statistics
Charleston Southern	Passing	London Johnson	0/1, 0 yards
Charleston Southern	Rushing	Ronnie Harris	10 carries, 71 yards
Charleston Southern	Receiving	N/A	N/A
Indiana	Passing	Peyton Ramsey	32/41, 320 yards, 2 TD, INT
Indiana	Rushing	Peyton Ramsey	15 carries, 54 yards, TD
Indiana	Receiving	Taysir Mack	7 receptions, 111 yards, 2 TD

=== vs No. 17 Michigan ===
No. 17 Michigan Wolverines (4–1) vs Indiana Hoosiers (3–2) – Game summary

Quarter	1	2	3	4	OT	Total
No. 17 Wolverines	3	10	0	7	7	27
Hoosiers	0	3	7	10	0	20

at Memorial Stadium • Bloomington, Indiana

- Date: October 14, 2017
- Game time: 12:00 p.m.
- Game weather: Sunny, 77 °F (25 °C)
- Game attendance: 52,929
- Referee: Mark Kluczyski
- TV announcers (ABC): Bob Wischusen (play-by-play), Brock Huard (analyst), Allison Williams (sideline)
- Sources: IUHoosiers.com

Game information

First Quarter

- (6:35) MICH – Quinn Nordin 40-yard field goal (Drive: 13 plays, 49 yards, 6:17; Michigan 3–0)

Second Quarter

- (14:54) MICH – Quinn Nordin 38-yard field goal (Drive: 4 plays, 7 yards, 2:06; Michigan 6–0)
- (10:19) MICH – Karan Higdon 12-yard run, Quinn Nordin kick (Drive: 7 plays, 80 yards, 2:46; Michigan 13–0)
- (1:46) IU – Griffin Oakes 32-yard field goal (Drive: 11 plays, 61 yards, 3:21; Michigan 13–3)

Third Quarter

- (12:06) IU – Morgan Ellison 8-yard run, Griffin Oakes kick (Drive: 6 plays, 64 yards, 1:24; Michigan 13–10)

Fourth Quarter

- (10:25) MICH – Karan Higdon 59-yard run, Quinn Nordin kick (Drive: 5 plays, 84 yards, 2:08; Michigan 20–10)
- (3:27) IU – Whop Philyor 8-yard pass from Peyton Ramsey, Griffin Oakes kick (Drive: 6 plays, 20 yards, 0:39; Michigan 20–17)
- (0:00) IU – Griffin Oakes 46-yard field goal (Drive: 6 plays, 47 yards, 0:54; Tied 20–20)

Overtime

- (0:00) MICH – Karan Higdon 25-yard run, Quinn Nordin kick (Drive: 1 play, 25 yards, 0:00; Michigan 27–20)

Statistics	MICH	IU
First downs	17	14
Total yards	329	278
Rushes/yards	44–271	29–80
Passing yards	58	198
Passing: Comp–Att–Int	10–20–0	21–43–2
Time of possession	35:09	24:51

Team	Category	Player	Statistics
Michigan	Passing	John O'Korn	10/20, 58 yards
Michigan	Rushing	Karan Higdon	25 carries, 200 yards, 3 TD
Michigan	Receiving	Donovan Peoples-Jones	4 receptions, 34 yards
Indiana	Passing	Peyton Ramsey	20/41, 178 yards, TD, 2 INT
Indiana	Rushing	Morgan Ellison	14 carries, 68 yards, TD
Indiana	Receiving	Luke Timian	7 receptions, 95 yards

=== At No. 18 Michigan State ===
Indiana Hoosiers (3–3) at No. 18 Michigan State Spartans (5–1) – Game summary

Quarter	1	2	3	4	Total
Hoosiers	3	0	3	3	9
No. 18 Spartans	0	3	0	14	17

at Spartan Stadium • East Lansing, Michigan

- Date: October 21, 2017
- Game time: 3:30 p.m.
- Game weather: Partly cloudy, 73 °F (23 °C)
- Game attendance: 74,111
- Referee: Rod Snodgrass
- TV announcers (ABC): Dave Flemming (play-by-play), Greg McElroy (analyst), Tom Luginbill (sideline)
- Sources: IUHoosiers.com

Game information

First Quarter

- (6:35) IU – Griffin Oakes 33-yard field goal (Drive: 4 plays, 0 yards, 1:14; Indiana 3–0)

Second Quarter

- (6:46) MSU – Matt Coghlin 23-yard field goal (Drive: 10 plays, 68 yards, 4:59; Tied 3–3)

Third Quarter

- (5:31) IU – Griffin Oakes 44-yard field goal (Drive: 13 plays, 61 yards, 4:28; Indiana 6–3)

Fourth Quarter

- (12:29) IU – Griffin Oakes 20-yard field goal (Drive: 12 plays, 63 yards, 4:37; Indiana 9–3)
- (5:59) MSU – Felton Davis 10-yard pass from Brian Lewerke, Matt Coghlin kick (Drive: 7 plays, 55 yards, 3:08; Michigan State 10–9)
- (1:49) MSU – L. J. Scott 18-yard run, Matt Coghlin kick (Drive: 7 plays, 64 yards, 3:15; Michigan State 17–9)

Statistics	IU	MSU
First downs	14	19
Total yards	252	274
Rushes/yards	35–94	44–89
Passing yards	158	185
Passing: Comp–Att–Int	22–34–0	16–30–0
Time of possession	25:39	34:21

Team	Category	Player	Statistics
Indiana	Passing	Peyton Ramsey	22/34, 158 yards
Indiana	Rushing	Morgan Ellison	17 carries, 47 yards
Indiana	Receiving	Simmie Cobbs	7 receptions, 53 yards
Michigan State	Passing	Brian Lewerke	16/29, 185 yards, TD
Michigan State	Rushing	L. J. Scott	22 carries, 87 yards, TD
Michigan State	Receiving	Cody White	6 receptions, 99 yards

=== At Maryland ===
Indiana Hoosiers (3–4) at Maryland Terrapins (3–4) – Game summary

Quarter	1	2	3	4	Total
Hoosiers	16	7	10	6	39
Terrapins	7	21	0	14	42

at Maryland Stadium • College Park, Maryland

- Date: October 28, 2017
- Game time: 3:40 p.m.
- Game weather: Partly cloudy, 68 °F (20 °C)
- Game attendance: 35,144
- Referee: Daniel Capron
- TV announcers (BTN): Lisa Byington (play-by-play), Jeremy Leman (analyst)
- Sources: IUHoosiers.com

Game information

First Quarter

- (11:18) IU – Simmie Cobbs 34-yard pass from Peyton Ramsey, Griffin Oakes kick (Drive: 10 plays, 75 yards, 3:42; Indiana 7–0)
- (9:03) IU – Cole Gest 23-yard pass from Peyton Ramsey, Griffin Oakes kick (Drive: 4 plays, 38 yards, 1:32; Indiana 14–0)
- (3:59) MARY – Lorenzo Harrison 14-yard run, Henry Darmstadter kick (Drive: 1 play, 14 yards, 0:06; Indiana 14–7)
- (0:06) IU – Team safety (Drive: 2 plays, -3 yards, 0:38; Indiana 16–7)

Second Quarter

- (7:51) MARY – Darnell Savage 16-yard punt return, Henry Darmstadter kick (Drive: 5 plays, 12 yards, 1:14; Indiana 16–14)
- (3:59) IU – Luke Timian 23-yard pass from Peyton Ramsey, Griffin Oakes kick (Drive: 9 plays, 70 yards, 3:45; Indiana 23–14)
- (2:46) MARY – Taivon Jacobs 14-yard pass from Max Bortenschlager, Henry Darmstadter kick (Drive: 4 plays, 65 yards, 1:13; Indiana 23–21)
- (0:37) MARY – D. J. Moore 2-yard pass from Max Bortenschlager, Henry Darmstadter kick (Drive: 6 plays, 50 yards, 0:55; Maryland 28–23)

Third Quarter

- (8:03) IU – Whop Philyor 11-yard pass from Richard Lagow, Griffin Oakes kick (Drive: 10 plays, 80 yards, 3:39; Indiana 30–28)
- (1:56) IU – Griffin Oakes 41-yard field goal (Drive: 11 plays, 50 yards, 4:53; Indiana 33–28)

Fourth Quarter

- (14:56) MARY – Jake Funk 1-yard run, Henry Darmstadter kick (Drive: 6 plays, 18 yards, 1:48; Maryland 35–33)
- (10:14) MARY – Jake Funk 1-yard run, Henry Darmstadter kick (Drive: 7 plays, 64 yards, 2:46; Maryland 42–33)
- (8:09) IU – Simmie Cobbs 5-yard pass from Richard Lagow (Drive: 6 plays, 74 yards, 1:57; Maryland 42–39)

Statistics	IU	MARY
First downs	35	18
Total yards	483	345
Rushes/yards	35–73	40–174
Passing yards	410	171
Passing: Comp–Att–Int	43–62–1	10–16–1
Time of possession	36:08	23:52

Team	Category	Player	Statistics
Indiana	Passing	Peyton Ramsey	31/41, 279 yards, 3 TD, INT
Indiana	Rushing	Cole Gest	12 carries, 38 yards
Indiana	Receiving	Simmie Cobbs	10 receptions, 138 yards, 2 TD
Maryland	Passing	Max Bortenschlager	10/16, 171 yards, 2 TD, INT
Maryland	Rushing	Ty Johnson	13 carries, 91 yards
Maryland	Receiving	D. J. Moore	4 receptions, 77 yards, TD

=== vs No. 9 Wisconsin ===
No. 9 Wisconsin Badgers (8–0) vs Indiana Hoosiers (3–5) – Game summary

Quarter	1	2	3	4	Total
No. 9 Badgers	0	14	10	21	45
Hoosiers	7	3	7	0	17

at Memorial Stadium • Bloomington, Indiana

- Date: November 4, 2017
- Game time: 12:00 p.m.
- Game weather: Cloudy, 59 °F (15 °C)
- Game attendance: 43,027
- Referee: Jeff Servinski
- TV announcers (ABC): Dave Pasch (play-by-play), Greg McElroy (analyst), Tom Luginbill (sideline)
- Sources: IUHoosiers.com

Game information

First Quarter

- (3:57) IU – Devonte Williams 23-yard pass from Richard Lagow, Griffin Oakes kick (Drive: 11 plays, 80 yards, 4:09; Indiana 7–0)

Second Quarter

- (14:11) IU – Griffin Oakes 26-yard field goal (Drive: 8 plays, 55 yards, 2:47; Indiana 10–0)
- (10:28) WISC – Alec Ingold 18-yard pass from Alex Hornibrook, Rafael Gaglianone kick (Drive: 7 plays, 73 yards, 2:43; Indiana 10–7)
- (6:21) WISC – Quintez Cephus 8-yard pass from Alex Hornibrook, Rafael Gaglianone kick (Drive: 2 plays, 21 yards, 0:41; Wisconsin 14–10)

Third Quarter

- (9:04) WISC – Rafael Gaglianone 21-yard field goal (Drive: 11 plays, 72 yards, 5:56; Wisconsin 17–10)
- (5:47) WISC – Jonathan Taylor 32-yard run, Rafael Gaglianone kick (Drive: 4 plays, 54 yards, 1:52; Wisconsin 24–10)
- (4:12) IU – Simmie Cobbs 17-yard pass from Richard Lagow, Griffin Oakes kick (Drive: 6 plays, 65 yards, 1:35; Wisconsin 24–17)

Fourth Quarter

- (10:15) WISC – Alec Ingold 1-yard run, Rafael Gaglianone kick (Drive: 7 plays, 27 yards, 3:31; Wisconsin 31–17)
- (5:19) WISC – Alec Ingold 1-yard run, Rafael Gaglianone kick (Drive: 8 plays, 33 yards, 4:51; Wisconsin 38–17)
- (2:19) WISC – Bradrick Shaw 1-yard run, Rafael Gaglianone kick (Drive: 4 plays, 16 yards, 2:03; Wisconsin 45–17)

Statistics	WISC	IU
First downs	24	16
Total yards	407	266
Rushes/yards	52–237	21–40
Passing yards	170	226
Passing: Comp–Att–Int	15–22–1	20–34–2
Time of possession	39:23	20:37

Team	Category	Player	Statistics
Wisconsin	Passing	Alex Hornibrook	13/20, 158 yards, 2 TD, INT
Wisconsin	Rushing	Jonathan Taylor	29 carries, 183 yards, TD
Wisconsin	Receiving	A. J. Taylor	3 receptions, 63 yards
Indiana	Passing	Richard Lagow	20/34, 226 yards, 2 TD, 2 INT
Indiana	Rushing	Alex Rodriguez	4 carries, 29 yards
Indiana	Receiving	Luke Timian	5 receptions, 64 yards

=== At Illinois ===
Indiana Hoosiers (3–6) at Illinois Fighting Illini (2–7) – Game summary

Quarter	1	2	3	4	Total
Hoosiers	0	14	3	7	24
Fighting Illini	0	0	7	7	14

at Memorial Stadium • Champaign, Illinois

- Date: November 11, 2017
- Game time: 11:00 a.m. CST
- Game weather: Partly cloudy, 41 °F (5 °C)
- Game attendance: 40,195
- Referee: Ron Snodgrass
- TV announcers (BTN): Cory Provus (play-by-play), Jeremy Leman (analyst)
- Sources: IUHoosiers.com

Game information

First Quarter

None

Second Quarter

- (6:30) IU – Morgan Ellison 2-yard run, Griffin Oakes kick (Drive: 10 plays, 45 yards, 2:59; Indiana 7–0)
- (0:48) IU – Ian Thomas 4-yard pass from Richard Lagow, Griffin Oakes kick (Drive: 8 plays, 90 yards, 2:16; Indiana 14–0)

Third Quarter

- (14:42) ILL – Louis Dorsey 77-yard pass from Jeff George Jr., Chase McLaughlin kick (Drive: 1 play, 77 yards, 0:18; Indiana 14–7)
- (5:13) IU – Griffin Oakes 28-yard field goal (Drive: 9 plays, 68 yards, 1:51; Indiana 17–7)

Fourth Quarter

- (12:59) ILL – Caleb Reams 14-yard pass from Jeff George Jr., Chase McLaughlin kick (Drive: 6 plays, 74 yards, 1:54; Indiana 17–14)
- (5:45) IU – Simmie Cobbs 5-yard pass from Richard Lagow, Griffin Oakes kick (Drive: 8 plays, 41 yards, 2:52; Indiana 24–14)

Statistics	IU	ILL
First downs	22	10
Total yards	428	294
Rushes/yards	42–139	30–33
Passing yards	289	261
Passing: Comp–Att–Int	32–48–1	13–26–2
Time of possession	34:25	25:35

Team	Category	Player	Statistics
Indiana	Passing	Richard Lagow	32/48, 298 yards, 2 TD, INT
Indiana	Rushing	Cole Gest	17 carries, 82 yards
Indiana	Receiving	Luke Timian	5 receptions, 62 yards
Illinois	Passing	Jeff George Jr.	13/26, 261 yards, 2 TD, 2 INT
Illinois	Rushing	Kendrick Foster	22 carries, 83 yards
Illinois	Receiving	Lou Dorsey	3 receptions, 107 yards, TD

=== vs Rutgers ===
Rutgers Scarlet Knights (4–6) vs Indiana Hoosiers (4–6) – Game summary

Quarter	1	2	3	4	Total
Scarlet Knights	0	0	0	0	0
Hoosiers	17	3	14	7	41

at Memorial Stadium • Bloomington, Indiana

- Date: November 18, 2017
- Game time: 12:00 p.m.
- Game weather: Rainy, 63 °F (17 °C)
- Game attendance: 35,949
- Referee: Mark Klucznski
- TV announcers (BTN): Cory Provus (play-by-play), Jeremy Leman (analyst)
- Sources: IUHoosiers.com

Game information

First Quarter

- (11:12) IU – Morgan Ellison 6-yard run, Griffin Oakes kick (Drive: 1 play, 6 yards, 0:04; Indiana 7–0)
- (8:17) IU – Ian Thomas 57-yard pass from Richard Lagow, Griffin Oakes kick (Drive: 3 plays, 69 yards, 0:50; Indiana 14–0)
- (2:29) IU – Griffin Oakes 26-yard field goal (Drive: 12 plays, 81 yards, 3:37; Indiana 17–0)

Second Quarter

- (9:09) IU – Griffin Oakes 20-yard field goal (Drive: 12 plays, 85 yards, 4:11; Indiana 20–0)

Third Quarter

- (11:38) IU – Luke Timian 25-yard pass from Richard Lagow, Griffin Oakes kick (Drive: 3 plays, 28 yards, 0:43; Indiana 27–0)
- (4:19) IU – Morgan Ellison 1-yard run, Griffin Oakes kick (Drive: 11 plays, 80 yards, 5:19; Indiana 34–0)

Fourth Quarter

- (8:27) IU – Cole Gest 8-yard run, Griffin Oakes kick (Drive: 7 plays, 57 yards, 4:41; Indiana 41–0)

Statistics	RUTG	IU
First downs	11	23
Total yards	190	503
Rushes/yards	33–87	48–267
Passing yards	103	236
Passing: Comp–Att–Int	11–24–0	17–28–1
Time of possession	26:59	33:01

Team	Category	Player	Statistics
Rutgers	Passing	Giovanni Rescigno	8/14, 67 yards
Rutgers	Rushing	Johnathan Lewis	6 carries, 36 yards
Rutgers	Receiving	Bo Melton	2 receptions, 31 yards
Indiana	Passing	Richard Lagow	17/28, 236 yards, 2 TD, INT
Indiana	Rushing	Morgan Ellison	15 carries, 149 yards, 2 TD
Indiana	Receiving	Ian Thomas	4 receptions, 93 yards, TD

=== At Purdue ===
Indiana Hoosiers (5–6) at Purdue Boilermakers (5–6) – Game summary

Quarter	1	2	3	4	Total
Hoosiers	7	3	0	14	24
Boilermakers	7	14	3	7	31

at Ross–Ade Stadium • West Lafayette, Indiana

- Date: November 25, 2017
- Game time: 12:00 p.m.
- Game weather: Sunny, 52 °F (11 °C)
- Game attendance: 52,105
- Referee: John O'Neill
- TV announcers (ESPN2): Mike Patrick (play-by-play), Tommy Tuberville (analyst), Paul Carcaterra (sideline)
- Sources: IUHoosiers.com

Game information

First Quarter

- (12:08) PUR – Jackson Anthrop 5-yard run, Spencer Evans kick (Drive: 1 play, 5 yards, 0:04; Purdue 7–0)
- (4:14) IU – Simmie Cobbs 1-yard pass from Richard Lagow, Griffin Oakes kick (Drive: 10 plays, 41 yards, 2:48; Tied 7–7)

Second Quarter

- (4:49) PUR – Jackson Anthrop 4-yard run, Spencer Evans kick (Drive: 7 plays, 60 yards, 2:04; Purdue 14–7)
- (0:53) PUR – Anthony Mahoungou 49-yard pass from Elijah Sindelar, J. D. Dellinger kick (Drive: 5 plays, 72 yards, 2:06; Purdue 21–7)
- (0:08) IU – Griffin Oakes 22-yard field goal (Drive: 7 plays, 71 yards, 0:45; Purdue 21–10)

Third Quarter

- (1:11) PUR – J. D. Dellinger 26-yard field goal (Drive: 13 plays, 78 yards, 5:36; Purdue 24–10)

Fourth Quarter

- (12:32) PUR – Isaac Ziko 4-yard pass from Elijah Sindelar, J. D. Dellinger kick (Drive: 6 plays, 55 yards, 2:39; Purdue 31–10)
- (5:50) IU – Taysir Mack 4-yard pass from Richard Lagow, Griffin Oakes kick (Drive: 6 plays, 59 yards, 1:47; Purdue 31–17)
- (1:01) IU – Whop Philyor 9-yard pass from Richard Lagow, Griffin Oakes kick (Drive: 11 plays, 87 yards, 2:29; Purdue 31–24)

Statistics	IU	PUR
First downs	20	22
Total yards	497	453
Rushes/yards	32–124	43–272
Passing yards	373	181
Passing: Comp–Att–Int	32–60–1	16–30–0
Time of possession	29:35	30:25

Team	Category	Player	Statistics
Indiana	Passing	Richard Lagow	32/60, 373 yards, 3 TD, INT
Indiana	Rushing	Ricky Brookins	2 carries, 71 yards
Indiana	Receiving	Taysir Mack	7 receptions, 132 yards, TD
Purdue	Passing	Elijah Sindelar	15/29, 159 yards, 2 TD
Purdue	Rushing	Markell Jones	31 carries, 217 yards
Purdue	Receiving	Anthony Mahoungou	2 receptions, 88 yards, TD

== Roster ==
2017 Indiana Hoosiers football team roster
Players
Coaches
Offense

Pos.	#	Name	Class
WR	1	Simmie Cobbs	Sr
RB	2	Devonte Williams	So
QB	3	Peyton Ramsey	So
WR	4	Whop Philyor	Fr
WR	5	J-Shun Harris II	Jr
WR	7	Taysir Mack	So
QB	9	Mike Fiacable	So
WR	10	Donavan Hale	Jr
QB	12	Nick Tronti	Fr
WR	13	Isaac James	So
WR	15	Nick Westbrook-Ikhine	Jr
QB	16	Austin King	So
WR	17	Justin Berry	Fr
WR	18	Ty Fryfogle	Fr
WR	19	Jonah Morris	Fr
RB	20	Cole Gest	Fr
QB	21	Richard Lagow	Sr
RB	23	Alex Rodriguez	Jr
RB	24	Mike Majette	Jr
WR	25	Luke Timian	Jr
RB	27	Morgan Ellison	Fr
RB	29	Craig Nelson	Fr
RB	31	Tyler Natee	So
RB	33	Ricky Brookins	Jr
RB	38	Connor Thomas	Fr
WR	39	Chris Gajcak	So
OL	51	Mackenzie Nworah	Fr
OL	52	DaVondre Love	So
OL	54	Coy Cronk	So
OL	56	Grayson Stover	Fr
OL	57	Harry Crider	Fr
OL	59	Jack Trainor	So
OL	61	Nick Ramacca	So
OL	62	Brandon Knight	Jr
OL	64	Ryan Smith	Fr
OL	68	Hunter Littlejohn	So
OL	71	Delroy Baker	Jr
OL	72	Simon Stepaniak	So
OL	73	Tyler Knight	Fr
OL	76	Wes Martin	Jr
OL	77	Caleb Jones	Fr
TE	80	Ian Thomas	Sr
TE	83	Austin Dorris	So
TE	84	Danny Friend	Sr
TE	85	Ryan Watercutter	Jr
TE	86	Peyton Hendershot	Fr
TE	88	Shaun Bonner	Fr
WR	89	Phil Benker	Fr
TE	90	Jared Smolar	Fr
TE	92	Shaun Bonner	Fr

Defense

Pos.	#	Name	Class
DB	1	Juwan Burgess	Fr
DB	3	Tyler Green	Jr
LB	4	Chris Covington	Sr
DB	6	Zeke Walker	Jr
LB	8	Tegray Scales	Sr
DB	9	Jonathan Crawford	Jr
DB	12	Jayme Thompson	Sr
DB	14	Andre Brown, Jr.	So
DB	16	Rashard Fant	Sr
DB	17	Raheem Layne	Fr
DB	18	Ben Bach	Sr
DB	19	Tony Fields	Sr
DB	20	Jameel Cook, Jr.	So
DB	22	LaDamion Hunt	Fr
DB	23	Khalil Bryant	So
LB	26	Kiante Walton	Jr
DB	28	A’Shon Riggins	So
DB	30	Chase Dutra	Sr
DB	31	Bryant Fitzgerald	Fr
DB	34	Thomas Henderson	So
LB	35	Nile Sykes	Jr
DB	36	Johnny Albomonte	So
LB	39	Kenny Arnold	Jr
LB	40	Reakwon Jones	So
LB	41	Mo Burnam	Fr
DB	42	Marcelino McCrary-Ball	So
LB	43	Dameon Willis Jr.	Jr
LB	44	Thomas Allen	Fr
LB	45	Tom Bolstad	So
DL	47	Robert McCray	Sr
DL	48	Omari Stringer	So
DL	49	Greg Gooch	Sr
DL	50	Joshua Brown	So
DL	51	Mike Barwick, Jr.	Jr
LB	53	Andrew Stamm	Fr
DL	54	Ja’Merez Bowen	Jr
LB	55	Michael McGinnis	Jr
LB	58	Garrett Lukens	So
DL	66	Tristen Watts	Fr
DL	69	Gavin Everett	So
DT	74	Nate Hoff	Sr
DL	87	Michael Ziemba	Fr
DL	90	Juan Harris	Fr
DL	91	Jocob Robinson	Jr
DL	92	Alfred Bryant	Fr
DL	93	LeShaun Minor Jr.	Fr
DL	94	Britt Beery	Fr
DL	95	Brandon Wilson	So
DL	96	Derrian Meminger	Jr
DL	97	Tramar Reece	Fr
DL	98	Jerome Johnson	Fr
DL	99	Allen Stallings IV	So

Special teams

Pos.	#	Name	Class
K	82	Logan Justus	So
P	88	Drew Conard	Fr
P	86	Joseph Gedeon	Jr
K	90	Jared Smolar	So
K	92	Griffin Oakes	Sr
K	93	Stephen Yaffe	Fr
P	94	Haydon Whitehead	So
LS	97	Dan Godsil	Jr
K	99	Nathanael Snyder	Fr

Head coach

- Tom Allen

Coordinators/assistant coaches

- Mike DeBord (Associate head coach / OC / TE)
- Mark Hagen (assistant defensive coordinator / dl)
- Grant Heard (Passing Game Coordinator / OL)
- Darren Hiller (Run Game Coordinator / OL)
- William Inge (LBs)
- Kevin Johns (offensive coord / qbs / wrs)
- Noah Joseph (Safeties)
- Mike Hart (RBs)
- Brandon Shelby (CBs)
- Nick Sheridan (QBs)
- Keith Caton (Head Strength & Conditioning)
- Billy Cosh (Graduate Asst – Offense)
- Pat Kuntz (Grad Asst – Defense)
- John Morookian (Grad Asst – Offense)
- Jeff McInerney (Quality Control – Special teams)
- Ryan McInerney (Quality Control – Recruiting/Def.)
- Sean Fisher (Quality Control – Offense)
- Matt Wilson (Senior Director of Football Recruiting)
- Scott Gasper (Director of player personnel)
- Kasey Teegardin (Director of On-Campus Recruiting)
- Mike Doig (Director of Operations)
- Mike Pechac (Dir Player Dev & Academic Enhancement)

Legend

- (C) Team captain
- (S) Suspended
- (I) Ineligible
- Injured
- Redshirt

Roster
Last update: August 2, 2017

== Statistics ==
=== Team ===
Team Statistics
	Indiana	Opponents
Points	322	304
First Downs	252	210
Rushing	79	98
Passing	144	84
Penalty	29	28
Rushing Yards	1561	1925
Rushing Attempts	449	497
Average Per Rush	3.5	3.9
Long	45	64
Rushing TDs	11	18
Passing Yards	3188	2156
Comp–Att	306-502	181-332
Comp %	61%	54.5%
Average Per Game	395.8	340.1
Average per Attempt	5	4.9
Passing TDs	25	18
INT's	13	5
Rating		
Touchdowns	39	39
Passing	25	18
Rushing	11	18
Defensive		
Interceptions	5	13
Yards	34	98
Long	34	
Total Offense	4749	4081
Total Plays	951	829
Average Per Yards/Game	395.8	340.1
Kick Returns: # – Yards	33–623	26–647
TDs	0	1
Long	31	98
Punts	85	95
Yards	3459	4052
Average	40.7	42.7
Punt Returns: # – Yards	29–368	25–124
TDs	2	1
Long	70	22
Fumbles – Fumbles Lost	15–7	19–8
Opposing TD's		
Penalties – Yards	71–707	91–796
3rd–Down Conversions	80/211	55/184
4th–Down Conversions	9/19	9/17
Takeaways		
Field Goals	16-17	10-13
Extra Point	38-39	38-38
Sacks	36	29
Sack Against		
Yards		

=== Offense ===
Passing Statistics
#	Na.m.E	GP	RAT	CMP	ATT	YDS	CMP%	TD	INT
21	Richard Lagow	10	124.79	172	295	1936	58.3	15	8
3	Peyton Ramsey	9	127.89	134	205	1252	65.4	10	5
9	Mike Fiacable	3	0	0	1	0	0	0	0
24	Mike Majette	5	0	0	1	0	0	0	0
	TOTALS	12	125.56	306	502	3188	61	25	13

Rushing Statistics
#	Na.m.E	POS	CAR	YDS	LONG	TD
27	Morgan Ellison	RB	143	725	45	6
20	Cole Gest	RB	93	440	42	1
3	Peyton Ramsey	QB	92	327	26	2
33	Ricky Brookins	RB	11	88	64	1
21	Richard Lagow	QB	37	81	14	0
2	Devonte Williams	RB	20	73	14	0
23	Alex Rodriguez	RB	16	65	19	0
24	Mike Majette	RB	22	32	9	0
22	Whop Philyor	WR	5	15	8	0
25	Luke Timian	WR	1	7	4	0
38	Connor Thomas	RB	3	6	3	0
1	Simmie Cobbs Jr.	WR	0	0	0	1
9	Mike Fiacable	QB	2	0	0	0
	TOTALS		449	1859	64	11

Receiving Statistics
#	Na.m.E	POS	REC	YDS	LONG	TD
1	Simmie Cobbs Jr.	WR	72	841	35	8
25	Luke Timian	WR	68	589	25	2
80	Ian Thomas	TE	25	376	71	5
22	Whop Philyor	WR	33	335	36	3
7	Taysir Mack	WR	23	310	52	3
2	Devonte Williams	RB	12	168	42	2
33	Ricky Brookins	RB	19	124	17	0
10	Donovan Hale	WR	7	116	32	1
24	Mike Majette	RB	12	90	20	0
20	Cole Gest	RB	10	83	23	1
85	Ryan Watercutter	TE	12	69	17	0
27	Morgan Ellison	RB	9	60	18	0
5	J-Shun Harris	WR	3	14	14	0
81	Ty Fryfogle	WR	1	13	13	0
	TOTALS		306	3188	71	25

=== Defense ===
Defensive Statistics
#	Na.m.E	POS	SOLO	AST	TOT	TFL-YDS	SACKS	INT-YDS	BU	PD	QBH	FR–YDS	FF	BLK	SAF
30	Chase Dutra	DB	65	31	96	1.5–2	0	0	3		0	1–0	1	0	0
8	Tegray Scales	LB	56	33	89	12.5–48	6	2–0	1		2	2–0	0	0	0
4	Chris Covington	LB	50	35	85	12.0–40	3	0–0	5		5	0–0	0	0	0
9	Jonathan Crawford	DB	42	20	62	3.0–8	0	1–0	8		0	1–0	0	1	0
19	Tony Fields	DB	44	12	56	5.0–15	1	1–34	1		0	1–4	1	0	0
14	Andrew Brown Jr.	DB	22	11	33	3.0–6	0	0–0	1		0	1–22	1	0	0
43	Dameon Willis	LB	15	12	27	1.0–2	0	0–0	1		0	0–0	0	0	0
49	Greg Gooch	DL	18	8	26	6.5–38	4.5	0–0	1		2	0–0	2	0	0
91	Jacob Robinson	DL	15	11	26	7.0–32	4	0–0	1		2	0–0	1	1	0
99	Allen Stallings IV	DL	15	10	25	5.5–26	3	0–0	0		2	0–0	1	0	1
16	Rashard Fant	DB	21	3	24	2.5–24	0	1–0	9		0	1–0	0	0	0
51	Mike Barwick Jr.	DL	11	13	24	3.0–12	2	0–0	0		1	0–0	0	0	0
42	Marcelino McCrary-Ball	DB	13	7	20	0.5–0	0	0–0	0		1	0–0	0	0	0
47	Robert McCray	DL	15	5	20	7.5–31	6	0–0	0		6	0–0	1	0	0
74	Nate Hoff	DL	17	2	19	5.5–25	2	0–0	0		0	0–0	0	0	0
98	Jerome Johnson	DL	10	8	18	3.5–4	1	0–0	0		0	0–0	0	0	0
28	A'Shon Riggins	DB	9	5	14	0–0	0	0–0	5		0	0–0	0	0	0
17	Raheem Layne	DB	12	1	13	0–0	0	0–0	0		0	0–0	0	0	0
6	Zeke Walker	DB	8	3	11	0–0	0	0–0	1		0	0–0	0	0	0
54	Ja'merez Bowen	DL	5	5	10	0.5–4	.5	0–0	0		0	0–0	0	0	0
29	Khalil Bryant	DB	5	4	9	0–0	0	0–0	0		0	0–0	0	0	0
95	Brandon Wilson	DL	4	5	9	0.5–1	0	0–0	0		0	0–0	0	0	0
93	Leshaun Minor	DL	5	3	8	2.5–11	1	0–0	1		0	0–0	0	0	0
12	Jayme Thompson	DB	6	1	7	0.5–2	0	0–0	0		0	0–0	0	0	0
40	Reakwon Jones	LB	3	4	7	0–0	0	0–0	0		0	0–0	0	0	0
55	Michael McGinnis	LB	3	4	7	1.0–3	0.5	0–0	0		0	0–0	0	0	0
69	Gavin Everett	DL	4	3	7	0.5–5	0.5	0–0	0		0	0–0	1	0	0
13	Isaac James	DB	2	3	5	0–0	0	0–0	0		0	0–0	0	0	0
18	Ben Bach	DB	2	2	4	0–0	0	0–0	0		0	0–0	0	0	0
22	Whop Philyor	WR	2	2	4	0–0	0	0–0	0		0	0–0	0	0	0
87	Michael Ziemba	DL	2	2	4	0–0	0	0–0	0		0	0–0	0	0	0
3	Tyler Green	DB	3	0	3	1–6	0	0–0	1		0	0–0	1	0	0
23	Alex Rodriguez	RB	2	1	3	0–0	0	0–0	0		0	0–0	0	0	0
26	Kiante Walton	LB	2	0	2	0–0	0	0–0	0		0	0–0	1	0	0
85	Ryan Watercutter	TE	1	1	2	0–0	0	0–0	0		0	0–0	0	0	0
92	Griffin Oakes	K	1	1	2	0–0	0	0–0	0		0	0–0	0	0	0
97	Dan Godsil	LS	2	0	2	0–0	0	0–0	0		0	0–0	0	0	0
21	LaDamion Hunt	DB	1	1	2	0–0	0	0–0	0		0	0–0	0	0	0
1	Simmie Cobbs Jr.	WR	1	0	1	0–0	0	0–0	0		0	0–0	0	0	0
2	Devonte Williams	RB	1	0	1	0–0	0	0–0	0		0	0–0	0	0	0
3	Peyton Ramsey	QB	1	0	1	0–0	0	0–0	0		0	0–0	0	0	0
54	Coy Cronk	OL	1	0	1	0–0	0	0–0	0		0	0–0	0	0	0
7	Taysir Mack	WR	1	0	1	0–0	0	0–0	0		0	0–0	0	0	0
25	Luke Timian	WR	1	0	1	0–0	0	0–0	0		0	0–0	0	0	0
71	Delroy Baker	OL	1	0	1	0–0	0	0–0	0		0	0–0	0	0	0
72	Simon Stepaniak	OL	0	1	1	0–0	0	0–0	0		0	0–0	0	0	0
76	Wes Martin	OL	1	0	1	0–0	0	0–0	0		0	0–0	0	0	0
94	Haydon Whitehead	P	1	0	1	0–0	0	0–0	0		0	0–0	0	0	0
50	Joshua Brown	DL	1	0	1	1–3	0	0–0	0		0	0–0	0	0	0
96	Derrian Meminger	DL	1	0	1	0–0	0	0–0	0		0	0–0	0	0	0
	TOTAL		524	273	797	87–348	35	5–34	38		21	8–26	11	2	1
	OPPONENTS		533	432	965	74–318	29	13–98	51		25	7–18	14	3	0
Key: POS: Position, SOLO: Solo Tackles, AST: Assisted Tackles, TOT: Total Tackles, TFL: Tackles-for-loss, SACK: Quarterback Sacks, INT: Interceptions, BU: Passes Broken Up, PD: Passes Defended, QBH: Quarterback Hits, FF: Forced Fumbles, FR: Fumbles Recovered, BLK: Kicks or Punts Blocked, SAF: Safeties

Interceptions Statistics
#	Na.m.E	POS	RTNS	YDS	AVG	TD	LNG
	TOTALS						

=== Special teams ===
Kicking statistics
#	Na.m.E	POS	Xp.m.	XPA	XP%	FGM	FGA	FG%	1–19	20–29	30–39	40–49	50+	LNG	PTS
	TOTALS														

Kick return statistics
#	Na.m.E	POS	RTNS	YDS	AVG	TD	LNG
	TOTALS						

Punting statistics
#	Na.m.E	POS	PUNTS	YDS	AVG	LONG	TB	FC	I–20	50+	BLK
	TOTALS										

Punt return statistics
#	Na.m.E	POS	RTNS	YDS	AVG	TD	LONG
	TOTALS						

=== Scores by quarter (all opponents) ===
	1	2	3	4	Total
All opponents	48	82	69	98	297
Indiana	88	95	78	61	322

=== Scores by quarter (B1G opponents) ===
	1	2	3	4	Total
B1G opponents	48	72	52	91	263
Indiana	57	54	51	47	209

== Awards and honors ==
=== Preseason awards / Watch list ===
Awards
Player	Award	Date Awarded	Ref.
Tegray Scales	Lott IMPACT Trophy Watch List	May 17, 2017	
Tegray Scales	Sporting News 2017 Preseason; Second Team All-American	June 28, 2017	
Tegray Scales	Bednarik Award Watch List	July 10, 2017	
Rashard Fant	Allstate AFCA Good Works Team Watch List	July 12, 2017	
Rashard Fant	Bronko Nagurski Trophy Watch List	July 13, 2017	
Tegray Scales	Bronko Nagurski Trophy Watch List	July 13, 2017	
Rashard Fant	Jim Thorpe Award Watch List	July 14, 2017	
Devonte Williams	Paul Hornung Award Watch List	July 14, 2017	
Tegray Scales	Butkus Award Watch List	July 17, 2017	
Rashard Fant	Wuerffel Trophy Watch List	July 18, 2017	
Nick Westbrook-Ikhine	Biletnikoff Award Watch List	July 18, 2017	
Richard Lagow	Unitas Award Watch List	July 19, 2017	
Tegray Scales	2017 Big Ten Player to Watch	July 24, 2017	
Richard Lagow	Earl Campbell Tyler Rose Award Watch List	August 15, 2017	
Simmie Cobbs	Biletnikoff Award Watch List	November 1, 2017	
Griffin Oakes	Lou Groza Award Semifinalist	November 2, 2017	

=== Players of the Week ===
Big Ten Weekly Awards
Player	Award	Date Awarded	Ref.
J-Shun Harris	Big Ten Special Teams Player of the Week	September 11, 2017	
J-Shun Harris	Big Ten Special Teams Player of the Week	September 25, 2017	
Morgan Ellison	Big Ten Freshman of the Week	September 25, 2017	
Whop Philyor	Big Ten Co-Freshmen of the Week	October 30, 2017	
Morgan Ellison	Big Ten Co-Freshmen of the Week	November 20, 2017	

Weekly Awards
Player	Award	Date Awarded	Ref.
Ian Thomas	John Mackey Award Tight End of the Week	September 27, 2017	

=== B1G Conference awards ===
Awards
Player	Award	Date Awarded	Ref.
Tegray Scales	First Team All-Big Ten	November 28, 2017	
Griffin Oakes	First Team All-Big Ten	November 28, 2017	
Rashard Fant	Second Team All-Big Ten	November 28, 2017	
Simmie Cobbs	First Team All-Big Ten	November 29, 2017	
Griffin Oakes	Big Ten Kicker of the Year	November 30, 2017	

== Radio ==
Radio coverage for all games will be broadcast on IUHoosiers.com All-Access and on various radio frequencies throughout the state. The primary radio announcer is long-time broadcaster Don Fischer with Play-by-Play.

== Players in the 2018 NFL draft ==
Player	Position	Round	Pick	NFL club
Ian Thomas	TE	4	101	Carolina Panthers
Chris Covington	LB	6	193	Dallas Cowboys
