= John Mellencamp Pavilion =

American athletics facility at Indiana University Bloomington

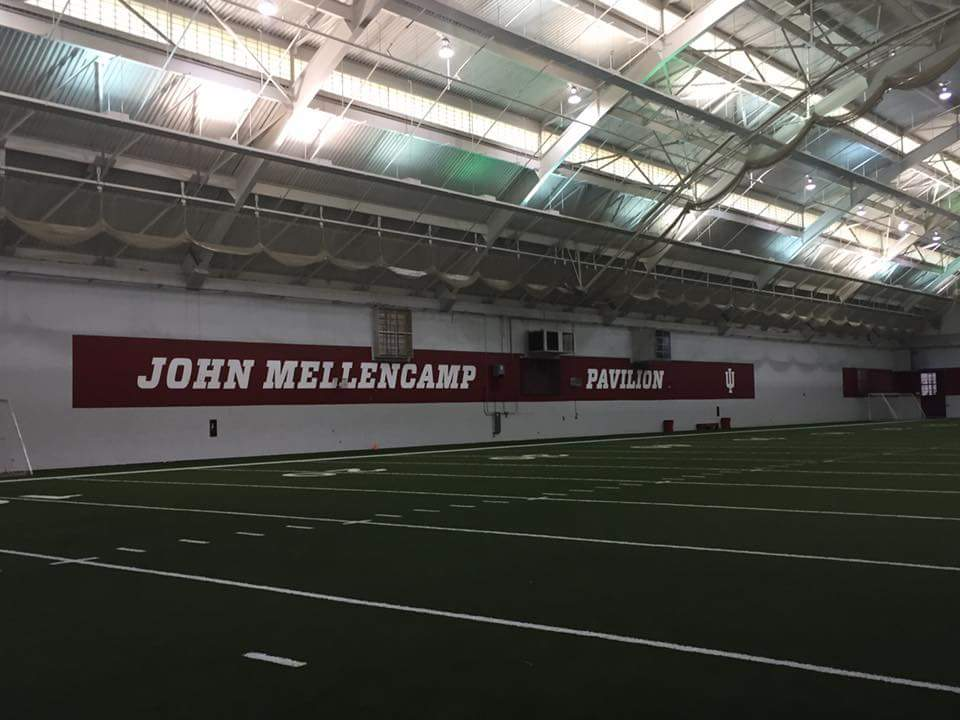
- Interior shot of John Mellencamp Pavilion

General information
- Type: Athletic Training Facility
- Location: 1800 North Dunn St, Bloomington IN 47408, United States
- Coordinates: 39.183266°N 86.524551°W
- Construction started: 1995
- Completed: 1996
- Owner: Indiana University

Technical details
- Floor count: 1
- Floor area: 100,000 sq ft

Design and construction
- Architect: Ratio Architects

The John Mellencamp Pavilion is the primary indoor athletics training facility of the Indiana Hoosiers' football program. It was dedicated on April 12, 1996, following a donation of $1.5 million from singer-songwriter John Mellencamp, to facilitate the project. The indoor practice facility contains a regulation-sized football field, featuring a Sportexe Momentum 41 artificial surface which was installed in 2007. The field can also accommodate field hockey, soccer, baseball, softball and golf.

The $6.5 million 96,129-square-foot (8,900 m^{2}) training facility was financed through donations and pledges from local area alumni, businesses and philanthropists including Mellencamp and Bill Cook. Ratio Architects of Indianapolis was the primary architect firm for the building with Weddle Brothers Construction Company facilitating its construction. Mellencamp Pavilion now exceeds more than 100,000 square feet (9,300 square metres) to include a meeting room, two offices, a training room, a full kitchen and 8,000 square-feet (743 m^{2}) of storage.

The building also includes two full side-by-side, outdoor grass fields which are utilized by the football team for outdoor practices. The fields are located directly west of the training facility and approximately 200 feet (61 meters) north of Merchants Bank Field at Memorial Stadium; the fields are accessible from the stadium, via a tunnel.

While the facility is not open to the public, it has previously been used for events including banquets, private events and staging for graduation ceremonies of Indiana University students.
