= Griffin Oakes =

American football player (born 1995)

No. 92
- Position: Placekicker

Personal information
- Born: February 24, 1995 (age 31)
- Listed height: 5 ft 8 in (1.73 m)
- Listed weight: 205 lb (93 kg)

Career information
- High school: Greenwood (Greenwood, Indiana)
- College: Indiana (2013–2017)

Awards and highlights
- 2× Big Ten Kicker of the Year (2015, 2017); 2× First-team All-Big Ten (2015, 2017)
- Stats at ESPN

Griffin Oakes (born February 24, 1995) is an American former college football placekicker for the Indiana Hoosiers.

== Early life ==
Oakes was a one-year letterman in soccer and a three-year letterman for the Greenwood High School football team. Oakes received Indiana Football Coaches Association All-State accolades as a junior and Indiana honorable mention in the Associated Press Class 4A All-State in his junior and senior year.

== College career ==
Oakes was a walk-on during the 2013 preseason camp. Head Coach Kevin Wilson would designate Oakes as a redshirt for the 2013 season.

In 2014, Oakes was 23–23 in extra point attempts and 13–18 (72 percent) in Field Goals. During the season, he kicked for a season-high, career high and school-career high long 58-yard field goal and converted a total of 62 points in the season. Oakes was selected as the Big Ten Special Teams Player of the Week, awarded IU special teams player of the week four times and Academic All-Big Ten honors at the end of the year.

In 2015, Oakes was 53–57 in Extra Point attempts and 24–29 (82.8 percent) in Field Goals. During the season, he kicked for a total of 125 points. At the end of the year, Oakes was selected by both the coaches and media as a first-team player on the 2015 All-Big Ten Conference football team.

Prior to the start of the 2016 season, Oakes was named to the 2016 preseason watch list for the Lou Groza Award. Oakes would finish the 2016 season 33–35 in Extra Point attempts and 16–26 (61.5 percent) in Field Goals.

During the 2017 season, Oakes was named a 2017 semi-finalist for the Lou Groza Award. Oakes would finish the 2017 season 38–39 in Extra Point attempts and 16–17 (94.1 percent) in Field Goals. Following the completion of the season, Oakes was selected by both the coaches and media as a first-team player on the 2017 All-Big Ten Conference football team.
