= Simmie Cobbs =

American football player (born 1995)

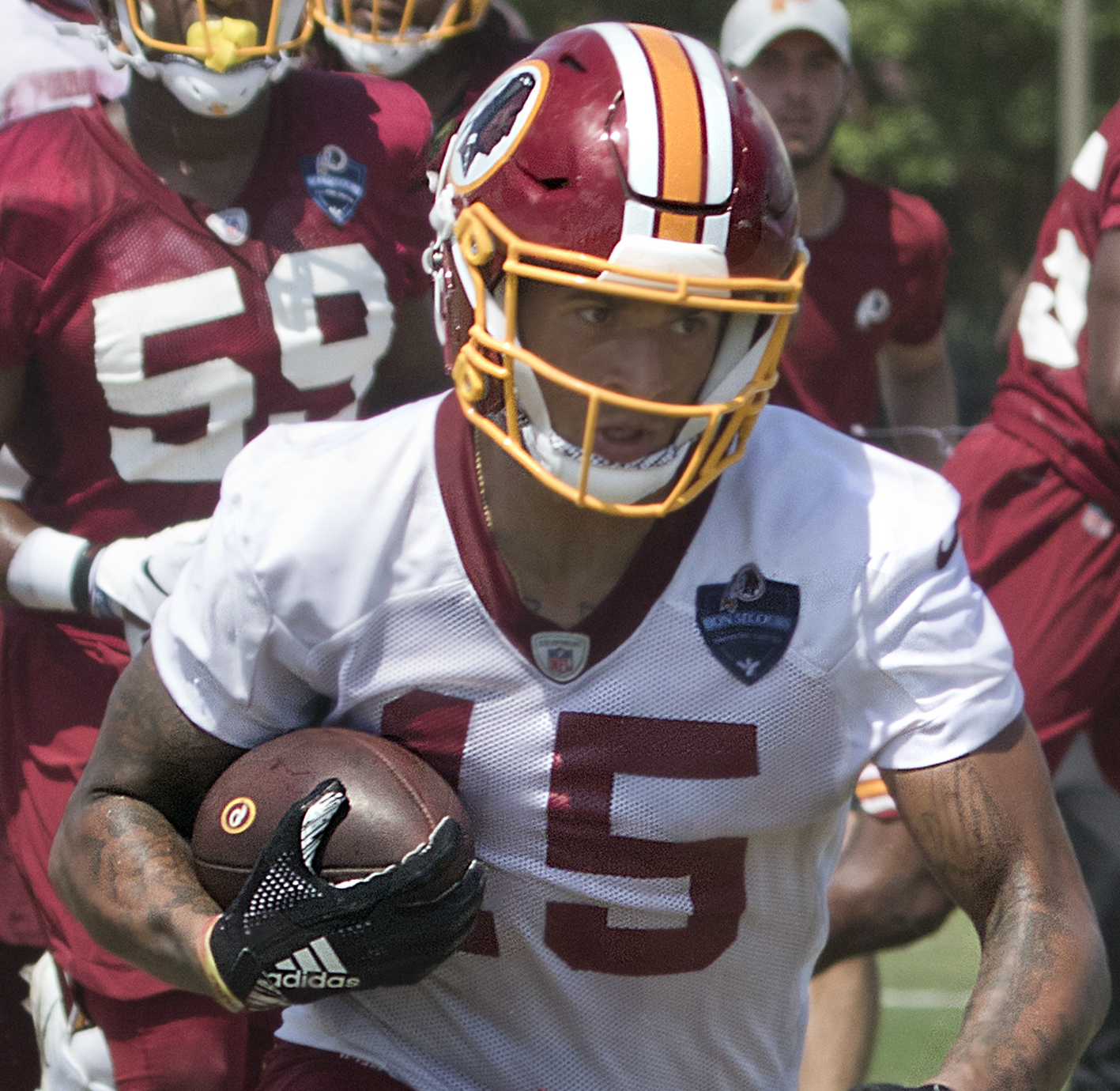
- Cobbs with the Washington Redskins in 2018

Profile
- Position: Wide receiver

Personal information
- Born: August 25, 1995 (age 31); Oak Park, Illinois, U.S.
- Listed height: 6 ft 3 in (1.91 m)
- Listed weight: 220 lb (100 kg)

Career information
- High school: Oak Park (IL)
- College: Indiana
- NFL draft: 2018: undrafted

Career history
- Washington Redskins (2018)*; New Orleans Saints (2018); Dallas Renegades (2020)*; DC Defenders (2020); DC Defenders (2023)*
- * Offseason or practice squad member only

Awards and highlights
- First-team All-Big Ten (2017)
- Stats at Pro Football Reference

Simmie O. Cobbs Jr. (born August 25, 1995) is an American former football wide receiver. He played college football at Indiana, and was signed by the Washington Redskins as an undrafted free agent in 2018.

== Early life ==
Cobbs attended Oak Park and River Forest High School in Oak Park, Illinois. He originally committed to Purdue University to play college football but changed his commitment to Indiana University.

College recruiting
Name	Hometown	School	Height	Weight	Commit date
Simmie Cobbs, Jr. WR	Oak Park, Illinois	Oak Park and River Forest High School	6 ft 4 in (1.93 m)	220 lb (100 kg)	Feb 3, 2014
Simmie Cobbs, Jr. WR	Recruit ratings: Scout: Rivals: 247Sports: ESPN:				
Overall recruit ranking: Scout: 74 (WR) 247Sports: 84 (WR) ESPN: 74 (WR)
Note: In many cases, Scout, Rivals, 247Sports, On3, and ESPN may conflict in their listings of height and weight.; In these cases, the average was taken. ESPN grades are on a 100-point scale.; Sources: "Indiana Football Commitment List". Rivals.; "2014 Player Commits". ESPN.; "2014 Team Ranking". Rivals.com.

== College career ==
As a freshman, Cobbs started all 12 games of the season. Cobbs recorded 114 receiving yards, with no touchdowns. His longest reception was for 34 yards against Indiana State. Due to Cobbs status as a freshman, as well as competing with teammate and future-NFL player Shane Wynn for receptions, Cobbs overall numbers were limited.

Cobbs took a medical redshirt in 2016 after player in only one game that season due to an ankle injury. After his redshirt junior season in 2017, Cobbs entered the 2018 NFL draft. During his career, he had 139 receptions for 1,990 yards and 12 touchdowns. He is also tied for fourth in Indiana history with seven 100-yard games.

== Professional career ==
Pre-draft measurables
Height	Weight	Hand span	40-yard dash	20-yard shuttle	Three-cone drill	Vertical jump	Broad jump	Bench press
6 ft 3 in (1.91 m)	220 lb (100 kg)	9 1/4	4.64 s	4.32 s	6.7 s	30 in (0.76 m)	9 ft 5 in (2.87 m)	11 reps
All values from NFL Combine

=== Washington Redskins ===
Cobbs signed with the Washington Redskins as an undrafted free agent following the 2018 NFL draft. On September 1, 2018, he was waived for final roster cuts before the start of the season, but signed to the team's practice squad the next day.

=== New Orleans Saints ===
On December 14, 2018, Cobbs was signed by the New Orleans Saints off the Redskins practice squad. He was placed on injured reserve on January 12, 2019.

Cobbs was waived during final roster cuts on August 30, 2019.

=== Dallas Renegades ===
Cobbs was signed by the Dallas Renegades of the XFL during training camp. He was waived during final roster cuts on January 22, 2020.

=== DC Defenders ===
Cobbs was claimed off waivers by the DC Defenders on January 22, 2020. He had his contract terminated when the league suspended operations on April 10, 2020.

On November 17, 2022, Cobbs was drafted by the Defenders, returning back to his old team from the 2020 XFL season.
