= Coy Cronk =

American football player (born 1998)

Profile
- Position: Offensive tackle

Personal information
- Born: January 18, 1998 (age 28); Lafayette, Indiana, U.S.
- Listed height: 6 ft 4 in (1.93 m)
- Listed weight: 318 lb (144 kg)

Career information
- High school: Central Catholic (Lafayette)
- College: Indiana; Iowa
- NFL draft: 2021: undrafted

Career history
- Green Bay Packers (2021)*; Jacksonville Jaguars (2021–2023); Minnesota Vikings (2023)*; Atlanta Falcons (2024)*; Minnesota Vikings (2024)*
- * Offseason or practice squad member only

Career NFL statistics as of 2023
- Games played: 3
- Stats at Pro Football Reference

Coy Cronk (born January 18, 1998) is an American professional football offensive tackle. He played college football for the Indiana Hoosiers and Iowa Hawkeyes. He previously played in the NFL for the Jacksonville Jaguars.

== Professional career ==
Pre-draft measurables
Height	Weight
6 ft 4 5/8 in (1.95 m)	305 lb (138 kg)
Values from Pro Day

=== Green Bay Packers ===
Cronk signed with the Green Bay Packers as an undrafted free agent but was released before the start of the 2021 season.

=== Jacksonville Jaguars ===
Cronk was signed by the Jacksonville Jaguars on October 22, 2021 He was waived during final roster cuts on August 30, 2022.

Cronk didn't make his debut until the 2022 season in a Week 16 win against the New York Jets. He was also elevated to the active roster for the Jaguars playoff game against the Los Angeles Chargers. He signed a reserve/future contract on January 23, 2023.

On August 29, 2023, Cronk was waived by the Jaguars and re-signed to the practice squad. He was released on November 3.

=== Minnesota Vikings ===
On November 4, 2023, Cronk was signed to the Minnesota Vikings practice squad. Following the end of the 2023 regular season, the Vikings signed him to a reserve/future contract on January 8, 2024. However, Cronk was released with a non–football injury designation on April 18.

=== Atlanta Falcons ===
On October 15, 2024, Cronk signed with the Atlanta Falcons practice squad, but was released a week later.

=== Minnesota Vikings (second stint) ===
On December 6, 2024, Cronk signed with the Minnesota Vikings practice squad. He was released on December 27.
