= Marcelino McCrary-Ball =

American football player (born 1999)

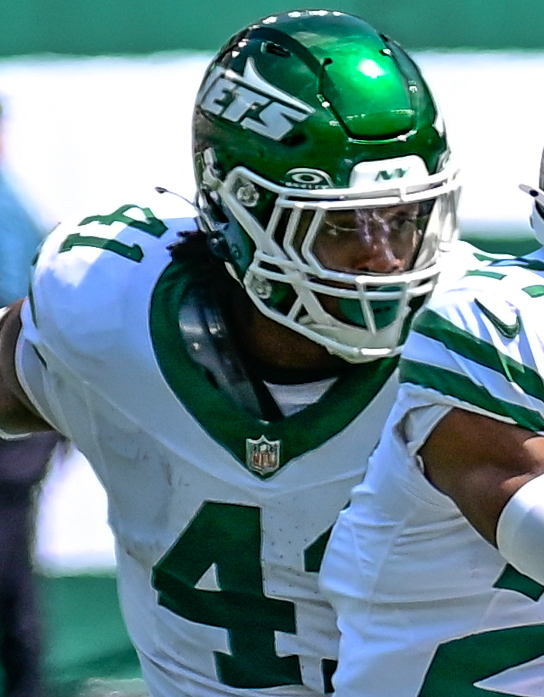
- McCrary-Ball with the New York Jets in 2024

No. 41 – New York Jets
- Position: Linebacker
- Roster status: Injured reserve

Personal information
- Born: March 23, 1999 (age 27); Roswell, Georgia, U.S.
- Listed height: 6 ft 0 in (1.83 m)
- Listed weight: 214 lb (97 kg)

Career information
- High school: Roswell (Roswell, Georgia)
- College: Indiana (2016–2021)
- NFL draft: 2022: undrafted

Career history
- San Francisco 49ers (2022)*; New York Jets (2023–present)
- * Offseason or practice squad member only

Career NFL statistics as of 2025
- Tackles: 30
- Forced fumbles: 1
- Stats at Pro Football Reference

Marcelino McCrary-Ball (born March 23, 1999) is an American professional football linebacker for the New York Jets of the National Football League (NFL). He played college football for the Indiana Hoosiers and was signed by the San Francisco 49ers as an undrafted free agent in 2022.

== Early life ==
McCrary-Ball attended and played high school football at Roswell High School in Roswell, Georgia.

== College career ==
In McCrary-Ball's collegiate career at Indiana, he notched 242 tackles with 16.5 going for a loss, five and half sacks, 16 pass deflections, four interceptions, a fumble recovery, and a forced fumble. McCrary-Ball also returned seven kickoffs for 144 yards.

== Professional career ==
Pre-draft measurables
Height	Weight	Arm length	Hand span	Wingspan	40-yard dash	10-yard split	20-yard split	20-yard shuttle	Three-cone drill	Vertical jump	Broad jump	Bench press
5 ft 11 3/4 in (1.82 m)	212 lb (96 kg)	31 7/8 in (0.81 m)	10 in (0.25 m)	6 ft 5 5/8 in (1.97 m)	4.51 s	1.53 s	2.60 s	4.27 s	7.03 s	35.5 in (0.90 m)	10 ft 1 in (3.07 m)	23 reps
All values from Pro Day

=== San Francisco 49ers ===
McCrary-Ball was signed by the San Francisco 49ers as an undrafted free agent in 2022.

=== New York Jets ===
On August 31, 2023, McCrary-Ball was signed to the New York Jets' practice squad. McCrary-Ball made his NFL debut in Week 11, where he played 19 special teams snaps against the Buffalo Bills. He was signed to the active roster on January 6, 2024.

On August 27, 2024, McCrary-Ball was waived by the Jets and re-signed to the practice squad. He was promoted to the active roster on October 30. He appeared in 12 games in the 2024 season; mainly playing on special teams.

McCrary-Ball began the 2025 season as one of New York's backup linebackers. In Week 3 against the Tampa Bay Buccaneers, he entered the game following an injury to Quincy Williams, but suffered a hamstring injury that necessitated an injured reserve placement on September 23, 2025. McCrary-Ball was activated on November 22, ahead of the team's Week 12 matchup against the Baltimore Ravens. He was placed back on injured reserve on December 6, due to recurring hamstring issues.

On September 22, 2026, McCrary-Ball was placed on injured reserve due to an ankle injury suffered in Week 2 against the Green Bay Packers.

== NFL career statistics ==
Legend
**Bold**	Career high

=== Regular season ===
Year	Team	Games		Tackles					Interceptions						Fumbles				
Year	Team	GP	GS	Cmb	Solo	Ast	Sck	TFL	Int	Yds	Avg	Lng	TD	PD	FF	Fum	FR	Yds	TD
2023	NYJ	2	0	0	0	0	0.0	0	0	0	0.0	0	0	0	0	0	0	0	0
2024	NYJ	12	0	7	3	4	0.0	0	0	0	0.0	0	0	0	0	0	0	0	0
2025	NYJ	5	0	**23**	**11**	**12**	0.0	**1**	0	0	0.0	0	0	0	**1**	0	0	0	0
Career		19	0	30	14	16	0.0	1	0	0	0.0	0	0	0	1	0	0	0	0
