= Robert McCray =

American football player (born 1996)

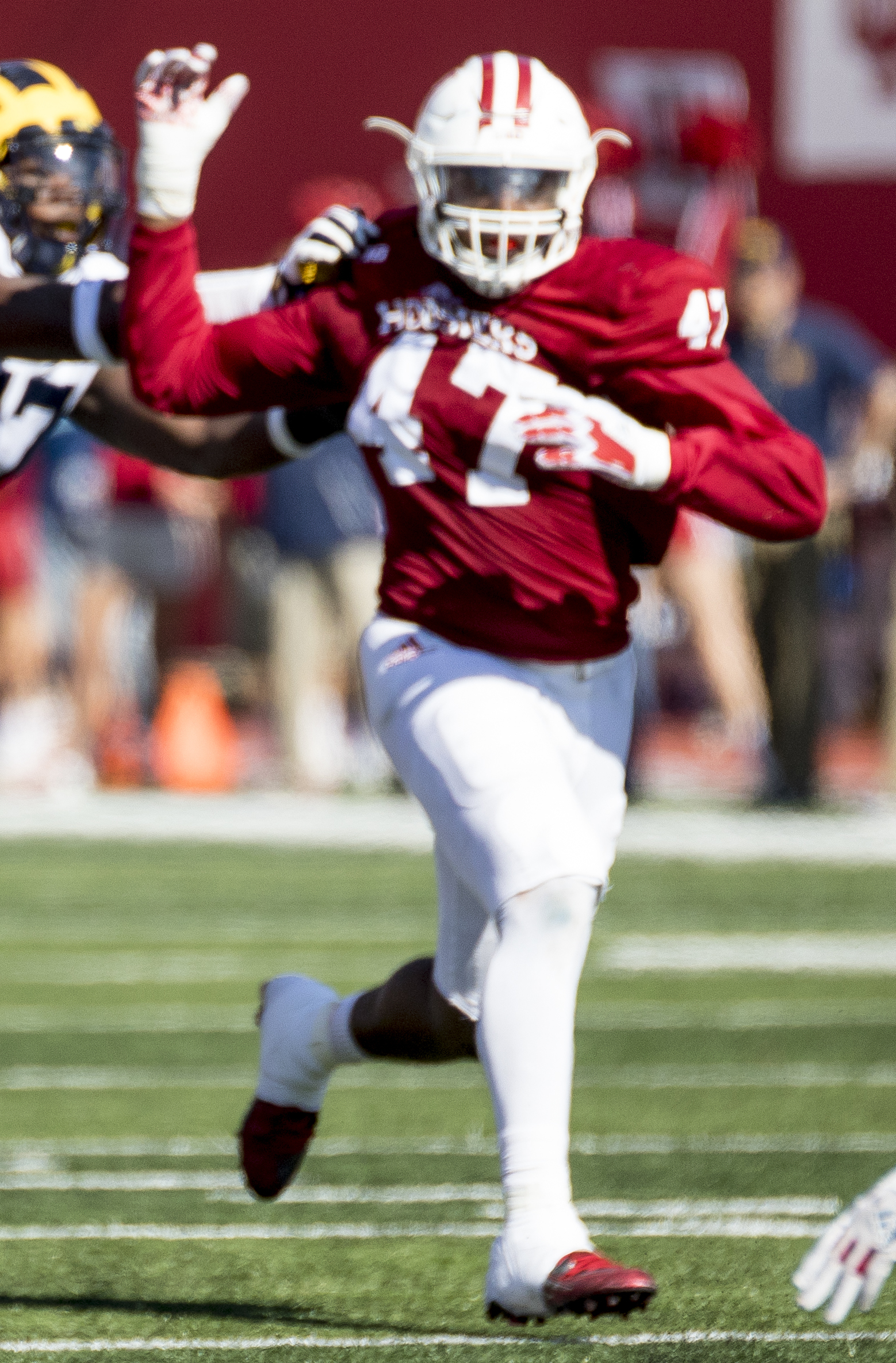

No. 52
- Position: Linebacker

Personal information
- Born: March 24, 1996 (age 30); Pensacola, Florida, U.S.
- Listed height: 6 ft 2 in (1.88 m)
- Listed weight: 280 lb (127 kg)

Career information
- High school: Rockdale County (Conyers, Georgia)
- College: Indiana
- NFL draft: 2018: undrafted

Career history
- Kansas City Chiefs (2018–2019)*; Cleveland Browns (2019); Detroit Lions (2021)*
- * Offseason or practice squad member only
- Stats at Pro Football Reference

Robert McCray III (born March 24, 1996) is an American former football linebacker. He played college football at the Indiana.

== Professional career ==
=== Kansas City Chiefs ===
McCray was signed by the Kansas City Chiefs as an undrafted free agent on May 8, 2018. He was waived at the end of training camp at the end of training camp and subsequently re-signed to the team's practice squad. He was waived again at the end of training camp in 2019.

McCray was drafted by the New York Guardians of the XFL. He was drafted in phase 5 which was an open draft where teams could select any player position, but never signed with the league.

=== Cleveland Browns ===
McCray was signed to the Cleveland Browns's practice squad on November 27, 2019. He was promoted to the Browns' active roster on December 21, 2019. McCray made his NFL Debut on December 22, 2019, against the Baltimore Ravens, finishing the game with one tackle.

McCray was waived by the Browns on September 5, 2020.

=== Detroit Lions ===
On January 14, 2021, McCray signed a reserve/futures contract with the Detroit Lions. He was waived on August 23, 2021.
