= 2016 Indiana Hoosiers football team =

American college football season

2016 Indiana Hoosiers football

Foster Farms Bowl, L 24–26 vs. Utah
- Conference: Big Ten Conference
- East Division
- Record: 6–7 (4–5 Big Ten)
- Head coach: Kevin Wilson (6th season; regular season); Tom Allen (bowl game)
- Offensive coordinator: Kevin Johns (6th season)
- Offensive scheme: Spread
- Defensive coordinator: Tom Allen (1st season)
- Base defense: 4–2–5
- MVPs: Dan Feeney; Tegray Scales
- Captains: Dan Feeney; Ricky Jones; Marcus Oliver; Mitchell Paige; Tegray Scales
- Home stadium: Memorial Stadium

2016 Big Ten Conference football standings
	Conf.			Overall
Team	W		L	W		L
East Division
No. 7 Penn State xy$	8	–	1	11	–	3
No. 6 Ohio State x^	8	–	1	11	–	2
No. 10 Michigan	7	–	2	10	–	3
Indiana	4	–	5	6	–	7
Maryland	3	–	6	6	–	7
Michigan State	1	–	8	3	–	9
Rutgers	0	–	9	2	–	10
West Division
No. 9 Wisconsin xy	7	–	2	11	–	3
Iowa	6	–	3	8	–	5
Nebraska	6	–	3	9	–	4
Minnesota	5	–	4	9	–	4
Northwestern	5	–	4	7	–	6
Illinois	2	–	7	3	–	9
Purdue	1	–	8	3	–	9
Championship: Penn State 38, Wisconsin 31
^ – College Football Playoff participant; $ – Conference champion; x – Division champion/co-champions; y – Championship game participant; Rankings from AP Poll

The 2016 Indiana Hoosiers football team represented Indiana University Bloomington during the 2016 NCAA Division I FBS football season. The Hoosiers competed in the East Division of the Big Ten Conference and played their home games at Memorial Stadium in Bloomington, Indiana. They were led by head coach Kevin Wilson, who was in his sixth season, for twelve games. Following their win against Purdue, the Hoosiers became bowl eligible for the second year in a row and were invited to the Foster Farms Bowl.

On December 1, 2016, Indiana announced that Kevin Wilson had been dismissed due to "philosophical differences", and that Tom Allen would permanently succeed Wilson as head coach, beginning at the bowl game.

== Offseason ==
=== Departures ===
Notable departures from the 2015 squad included:

Name	Number	Pos.	Height	Weight	Year	Hometown	Notes
Jordan Howard	#8	RB	6'0"	230	Junior	Gardendale, AL	Declared for the 2016 NFL Draft
Jason Spriggs	#78	OT	6'6"	301	Senior	Chicago, IL	Declared for the 2016 NFL Draft
Nate Sudfeld	#7	QB	6'6"	234	Senior	Modesto, CA	Declared for the 2016 NFL Draft

== Schedule ==
Indiana announced its 2016 football schedule on July 11, 2013. The 2016 schedule consists of seven home and five away games in the regular season. The Hoosiers will host Big Ten foes Maryland, Michigan State, Nebraska, Penn State, and Purdue, and will travel to Michigan, Northwestern, Ohio State, and Rutgers.

The team will host two of the three non–conference games which are against Ball State Cardinals from the Mid-American Conference (MAC), Florida International Panthers (FIU) from Conference USA, and Wake Forest Demon Deacons from the Atlantic Coast Conference (ACC).

Date	Time	Opponent	Site	TV	Result	Attendance
September 1	7:30 pm	at FIU*	FIU Stadium; Miami, FL	ESPNU	W 34–13	16,089
September 10	4:00 pm	Ball State*	Memorial Stadium; Bloomington, IN	ESPNews	W 30–20	41,374
September 24	3:30 pm	Wake Forest*	Memorial Stadium; Bloomington, IN	BTN	L 28–33	45,519
October 1	8:00 pm	No. 17 Michigan State	Memorial Stadium; Bloomington, IN (rivalry)	BTN	W 24–21 ^{OT}	43,971
October 8	3:30 pm	at No. 2 Ohio State	Ohio Stadium; Columbus, OH	ESPN	L 17–38	107,420
October 15	3:30 pm	No. 10 Nebraska^{†}	Memorial Stadium; Bloomington, IN	ABC/ESPN2	L 22–27	48,254
October 22	12:00 pm	at Northwestern	Ryan Field; Evanston, IL	BTN	L 14–24	35,417
October 29	3:30 pm	Maryland	Memorial Stadium; Bloomington, IN	ESPNU	W 42–36	38,291
November 5	12:00 pm	at Rutgers	High Point Solutions Stadium; Piscataway, NJ	BTN	W 33–27	37,345
November 12	12:00 pm	No. 12 Penn State	Memorial Stadium; Bloomington, IN	ABC/ESPN2	L 31–45	40,678
November 19	3:30 pm	at No. 4 Michigan	Michigan Stadium; Ann Arbor, MI	ESPN	L 10–20	110,288
November 26	12:00 pm	Purdue	Memorial Stadium; Bloomington, IN (Old Oaken Bucket)	ESPNU	W 26–24	43,103
December 28	8:30 pm	Utah	Levi's Stadium; Santa Clara, CA (Foster Farms Bowl)	FOX	L 24–26	27,608
*Non-conference game; ^{†}Homecoming; Rankings from AP Poll released prior to the game; All times are in Eastern time

== Game summaries ==
=== At FIU ===
Indiana Hoosiers (0–0) at FIU Golden Panthers (0–0) – Game summary

Quarter	1	2	3	4	Total
Hoosiers	5	7	0	22	34
Golden Panthers	3	7	3	0	13

at FIU Stadium • Miami, Florida

- Date: September 1, 2016
- Game time: 07:30 p.m.
- Game weather: Cloudy, 81 °F (27 °C)
- Game attendance: 16,089
- Referee: Jeff Servinski
- TV: ESPNU
- Sources: IUHoosiers.com FIUsports.com

Game information

First Quarter

- (9:40) FIU – Austin Taylor 24-yard field goal (Drive: 12 plays, 64 yards, 5:20; Florida International 3–0)
- (6:46) IU – Team safety (Drive: 1 plays, -1 yards, 0:44; Florida International 3–2)
- (3:17) IU – Griffin Oakes 22-yard field goal (Drive: 4 plays, 13 yards, 1:33; Indiana 5–3)

Second Quarter

- (13:00) IU – Rashard Fant 34-yard interception return, Griffin Oakes kick (Drive: 2 plays, 5 yards, 0:32; Indiana 12–3)
- (10:04) FIU – Alex Gardner 1-yard run, Austin Taylor kick (Drive: 7 plays, 56 yards, 2:56; Indiana 12–10)

Third Quarter

- (0:08) FIU – Austin Taylor 29-yard field goal (Drive: 6 plays, 63 yards, 1:48; Florida International 13–12)

Fourth Quarter

- (12:55) IU – Danny Friend 21-yard pass from Richard Lagow, Ricky Jones two-point run (Drive: 5 plays, 73 yards, 2:13; Indiana 20–13)
- (6:54) IU – Richard Lagow 6-yard run, Griffin Oakes kick (Drive: 9 plays, 80 yards, 4:07; Indiana 27–13)
- (3:57) IU – Tegray Scales 16-yard interception return, Griffin Oakes kick (Drive: 2 plays, 0 yards, 0:13; Indiana 34–13)

Statistics	IU	FIU
First downs	26	16
Total yards	486	331
Rushes/yards	52–246	21–63
Passing yards	240	268
Passing: Comp–Att–Int	18–28–0	24–47–3
Time of possession	33:20	26:40

Team	Category	Player	Statistics
Indiana	Passing	Richard Lagow	18/27, 240 yards, TD
Indiana	Rushing	Devine Redding	22 carries, 135 yards
Indiana	Receiving	Nick Westbrook-Ikhine	6 receptions, 70 yards
FIU	Passing	Alex McGough	23/46, 263 yards, 3 INT
FIU	Rushing	Tony Gaither IV	1 carry, 27 yards
FIU	Receiving	Stantley Thomas-Oliver	3 receptions, 91 yards

=== vs Ball State ===
Ball State Cardinals (1–0) vs Indiana Hoosiers (1–0) – Game summary

Quarter	1	2	3	4	Total
Cardinals	0	0	3	17	20
Hoosiers	10	10	10	0	30

at Memorial Stadium • Bloomington, Indiana

- Date: September 10, 2016
- Game time: 4:00 p.m.
- Game weather: Rainy, 73 °F (23 °C)
- Game attendance: 41,374
- Referee: Mark Kluczynski
- TV: ESPNN
- Sources: IUHoosiers.com

Game information

First Quarter

- (11:13) IU – Griffin Oakes 29-yard field goal (Drive: 5 plays, 14 yards, 2:27; Indiana 3–0)
- (8:23) IU – Nick Westbrook-Ikhine 43-yard pass from Richard Lagow, Griffin Oakes kick (Drive: 4 plays, 66 yards, 1:17; Indiana 10–0)

Second Quarter

- (3:42) IU – Luke Timian 10-yard pass from Richard Lagow, Griffin Oakes kick (Drive: 6 plays, 86 yards, 1:49; Indiana 17–0)
- (0:00) IU – Griffin Oakes 49-yard field goal (Drive: 9 plays, 33 yards, 3:35; Indiana 20–0)

Third Quarter

- (14:17) IU – Nick Westbrook-Ikhine 79-yard pass from Richard Lagow, Griffin Oakes kick (Drive: 2 plays, 81 yards, 0:43; Indiana 27–0)
- (10:29) IU – Griffin Oakes 41-yard field goal (Drive: 7 plays, 38 yards, 2:23; Indiana 30–0)
- (3:37) BALL – Morgan Hagee 22-yard field goal (Drive: 10 plays, 79 yards, 2:59; Indiana 30–3)

Fourth Quarter

- (13:46) BALL – Morgan Hagee 38-yard field goal (Drive: 7 plays, 63 yards, 2:25; Indiana 30–6)
- (12:53) BALL – Malik Dunner 3-yard blocked punt return, Morgan Hagee kick (Drive: 3 plays, -8 yards, 0:53; Indiana 30–13)
- (3:06) BALL – Jordan Hogue 5-yard pass from Riley Neal, Morgan Hagee kick (Drive: 13 plays, 78 yards, 6:02; Indiana 30–20)

Statistics	BALL	IU
First downs	18	19
Total yards	371	453
Rushes/yards	38–140	45–187
Passing yards	231	266
Passing: Comp–Att–Int	15–30–1	17–27–0
Time of possession	28:41	31:19

Team	Category	Player	Statistics
Ball State	Passing	Riley Neal	15/30, 231 yards, TD, INT
Ball State	Rushing	James Gilbert	12 carries, 54 yards
Ball State	Receiving	Kevonn Mabon	5 receptions, 84 yards
Indiana	Passing	Richard Lagow	17/27, 266 yards, 3 TD
Indiana	Rushing	Devine Redding	26 carries, 110 yards
Indiana	Receiving	Nick Westbrook-Ikhine	3 receptions, 133 yards, 2 TD

=== vs Wake Forest ===
Wake Forest Demon Deacons (3–0) vs Indiana Hoosiers (2–0) – Game summary

Quarter	1	2	3	4	Total
Demon Deacons	7	14	6	6	33
Hoosiers	7	0	14	7	28

at Memorial Stadium • Bloomington, Indiana

- Date: September 24, 2016
- Game time: 3:35 p.m.
- Game weather: Partly sunny, 84 °F (29 °C)
- Game attendance: 45,519
- Referee: Don Willard
- TV announcers (BTN): Joe Beninati (play-by-play), Jeremy Leman (analyst)
- Sources:IUHoosiers.com

Game information

First Quarter

- (14:47) IU – Nick Westbrook-Ikhine 75-yard pass from Richard Lagow, Griffin Oakes kick (Drive: 1 play, 75 yards, 0:13; Indiana 7–0)
- (2:56) WAKE – John Wolford 4-yard run, Mike Weaver kick (Drive: 12 plays, 61 yards, 4:42; Tied 7–7)

Second Quarter

- (9:35) WAKE – Jessie Bates 55-yard interception return, Mike Weaver kick (Drive: 5 plays, 16 yards, 1:50; Wake Forest 14–7)
- 0:58) WAKE – Chuck Wade Jr. 26-yard pass from John Wolford, Mike Weaver kick (Drive: 6 plays, 80 yards, 1:58; Wake Forest 21–7)

Third Quarter

- (11:12) WAKE – Mike Weaver 46-yard field goal (Drive: 5 plays, 15 yards, 1:37; Wake Forest 24–7)
- (10:39) IU – Nick Westbrook-Ikhine 10-yard pass from Richard Lagow, Griffin Oakes kick (Drive: 2 plays, 75 yards, 0:33; Wake Forest 24–14)
- (2:22) WAKE – Mike Weaver 30-yard field goal (Drive: 8 plays, 54 yards, 3:24; Wake Forest 27–14)
- (0:39) IU – Tyler Natee 1-yard run, Griffin Oakes kick (Drive: 4 plays, 65 yards, 1:43; Wake Forest 27–21)

Fourth Quarter

- (13:46) WAKE – John Wolford 11-yard run (Drive: 12 plays, 75 yards, 5:40; Wake Forest 33–21)
- (0:11) IU – Donavan Hale 49-yard pass from Richard Lagow, Griffin Oakes kick (Drive: 4 plays, 73 yards, 0:35; Wake Forest 33–28)

Statistics	WAKE	IU
First downs	21	25
Total yards	352	611
Rushes/yards	50–180	32–115
Passing yards	172	496
Passing: Comp–Att–Int	16–29–0	28–47–5
Time of possession	33:53	26:07

Team	Category	Player	Statistics
Wake Forest	Passing	John Wolford	16/29, 172 yards, TD
Wake Forest	Rushing	Matt Colburn	29 carries, 103 yards
Wake Forest	Receiving	Chuck Wade Jr.	6 receptions, 59 yards, TD
Indiana	Passing	Richard Lagow	28/47, 496 yards, 3 TD, 5 INT
Indiana	Rushing	Devine Redding	16 carries, 68 yards
Indiana	Receiving	Ricky Jones	8 receptions, 208 yards

=== vs No. 17 Michigan State ===
No. 17 Michigan State Spartans (2–1) vs Indiana Hoosiers (2–1) – Game summary

Quarter	1	2	3	4	OT	Total
No. 17 Spartans	7	0	7	7	0	21
Hoosiers	0	0	7	14	3	24

at Memorial Stadium • Bloomington, Indiana

- Date: October 1, 2016
- Game time: 8:00 p.m.
- Game weather: Partly cloudy, 55 °F (13 °C)
- Game attendance: 43,971
- Referee: Michael Cannon
- TV announcers (BTN): Eric Collins (play-by-play), Glen Mason (analyst)
- Sources:IUHoosiers.com

Game information

First Quarter

- (4:39) MSU – R. J. Shelton 86-yard pass from Tyler O'Connor, Michael Geiger kick (Drive: 2 plays, 87 yards, 0:42; Michigan State 7–0)

Second Quarter

None

Third Quarter

- (4:00) MSU – Delton Williams 24-yard pass from Tyler O'Connor, Michael Geiger kick (Drive: 7 plays, 77 yards, 3:42; Michigan State 14–0)
- (0:52) IU – Richard Lagow 5-yard pass from Mitchell Paige, Griffin Oakes kick (Drive: 7 plays, 75 yards, 3:08; Michigan State 14–7)

Fourth Quarter

- (8:23) IU – Ricky Jones 22-yard pass from Richard Lagow, Griffin Oakes kick (Drive: 8 plays, 90 yards, 3:03; Tied 14–14)
- (4:38) IU – Mitchell Paige 15-yard pass from Richard Lagow, Griffin Oakes kick (Drive: 5 plays, 70 yards, 1:44; Indiana 21–14)
- (0:11) MSU – Josiah Price 2-yard pass from Tyler O'Connor, Michael Geiger kick (Drive: 13 plays, 75 yards, 4:27; Tied 21–21)

Overtime

- (0:00) IU – Griffin Oakes 20-yard field goal (Drive: 6 plays, 22 yards, 0:00; Indiana 24–21)

Statistics	MSU	IU
First downs	21	19
Total yards	438	437
Rushes/yards	41–175	39–156
Passing yards	263	261
Passing: Comp–Att–Int	21–35–0	17–28–1
Time of possession	33:23	26:37

Team	Category	Player	Statistics
Michigan State	Passing	Tyler O'Connor	21/35, 263 yards, 3 TD
Michigan State	Rushing	Gerald Holmes	9 carries, 51 yards
Michigan State	Receiving	R. J. Shelton	7 receptions, 141 yards, TD
Indiana	Passing	Richard Lagow	16/26, 276 yards, 2 TD, INT
Indiana	Rushing	Devine Redding	19 carries, 100 yards
Indiana	Receiving	Ricky Jones	5 receptions, 124 yards, TD

=== At No. 2 Ohio State ===
Indiana Hoosiers (3–1) at No. 2 Ohio State Buckeyes (4–0) – Game summary

Quarter	1	2	3	4	Total
Hoosiers	3	7	7	0	17
No. 2 Buckeyes	3	21	7	7	38

at Ohio Stadium • Columbus, Ohio

- Date: October 8, 2016
- Game time: 3:35 p.m.
- Game weather: Sunny, 64 °F (18 °C)
- Game attendance: 107,420
- Referee: Ron Snodgrass
- TV announcers (ESPN): Bob Wischusen (play-by-play), Brock Huard (analyst), Allison Williams (sideline)
- Sources:IUHoosiers.com

Game information

First Quarter

- (11:09) IU – Griffin Oakes 22-yard field goal (Drive: 7 plays, 25 yards, 2:43; Indiana 3–0)
- (6:31) OSU – Tyler Durbin 37-yard field goal (Drive: 10 plays, 51 yards, 4:38; Tied 3–3)

Second Quarter

- (10:47) OSU – Mike Weber 9-yard run, Tyler Durbin kick (Drive: 2 plays, 9 yards, 0:41; Ohio State 10–3)
- (3:32) OSU – Curtis Samuel 5-yard run, Tyler Durbin kick (Drive: 5 plays, 73 yards, 2:07; Ohio State 17–3)
- (1:03) IU – Mitchell Paige 18-yard pas Griffin Oakes from Richard Lagow, Griffin Oakes kick (Drive: 7 plays, 65 yards, 2:29; Ohio State 17–10)
- (0:30) OSU – J. T. Barrett 5-yard run, Tyler Durbin kick (Drive: 2 plays, 6 yards, 0:33; Ohio State 24–10)

Third Quarter

- (9:59) IU – Danny Friend 7-yard pass from Richard Lagow, Griffin Oakes kick (Drive: 13 plays, 89 yards, 5:01; Ohio State 24–17)
- (3:38) OSU – Mike Weber 1-yard run, Tyler Durbin kick (Drive: 13 plays, 85 yards, 6:21; Ohio State 31–17)

Fourth Quarter

- (3:51) OSU – Dontre Wilson 37-yard pass from J. T. Barrett, Tyler Durbin kick (Drive: 4 plays, 33 yards, 1:24; Ohio State 38–17)

Statistics	IU	OSU
First downs	14	18
Total yards	281	383
Rushes/yards	40–99	50–290
Passing yards	182	93
Passing: Comp–Att–Int	14–28–1	9–21–1
Time of possession	27:02	32:58

Team	Category	Player	Statistics
Indiana	Passing	Richard Lagow	14/28, 182 yards, 2 TD, INT
Indiana	Rushing	Devine Redding	22 carries, 78 yards
Indiana	Receiving	Nick Westbrook-Ikhine	2 receptions, 67 yards
Ohio State	Passing	J. T. Barrett	9/21, 93 yards, TD, INT
Ohio State	Rushing	J. T. Barrett	26 carries, 137 yards, TD
Ohio State	Receiving	Dontre Wilson	3 receptions, 42 yards, TD

=== vs No. 10 Nebraska ===
No. 10 Nebraska Cornhuskers (5–0) vs Indiana Hoosiers (3–2) – Game summary

Quarter	1	2	3	4	Total
No. 10 Cornhuskers	17	0	0	10	27
Hoosiers	0	8	7	7	22

at Memorial Stadium • Bloomington, Indiana

- Date: October 15, 2016
- Game time: 3:35 p.m.
- Game weather: Partly cloudy, 72 °F (22 °C)
- Game attendance: 48,254
- Referee: Jeff Servinski
- TV announcers (ABC): Mike Patrick (play-by-play), Ed Cunningham (analyst), Jerry Punch (sideline)
- Sources:IUHoosiers.com

Game information

First Quarter

- (9:46) NEB – Drew Brown 40-yard field goal (Drive: 12 plays, 52 yards, 5:14; Nebraska 3–0)
- (4:47) NEB – Terrell Newby 4-yard run, Drew Brown kick (Drive: 6 plays, 64 yards, 2:21; Nebraska 10–0)
- (4:33) NEB – Chris Jones 33-yard interception return, Drew Brown kick (Drive: 1 play, 0 yards, 0:14; Nebraska 17–0)

Second Quarter

- (12:39) IU – Team safety (Drive: 3 plays, 5 yards, 1:43; Nebraska 17–2)
- (7:23) IU – Griffin Oakes 36-yard field goal (Drive: 12 plays, 57 yards, 5:06; Nebraska 17–5)
- (1:18) IU – Griffin Oakes 45-yard field goal (Drive: 4 plays, 0 yards, 0:34; Nebraska 17–8)

Third Quarter

- (0:00) IU – Devine Redding 33-yard run, Griffin Oakes kick (Drive: 2 plays, 33 yards, 0:09; Nebraska 17–15)

Fourth Quarter

- (9:57) NEB – Stanley Morgan Jr. 72-yard pass from Tommy Armstrong Jr., Drew Brown kick (Drive: 5 plays, 85 yards, 2:15; Nebraska 24–15)
- (8:26) IU – Devine Redding 4-yard pass from Richard Lagow, Griffin Oakes kick (Drive: 5 plays, 75 yards, 1:31; Nebraska 24–22)
- (0:45) NEB – Drew Brown 39-yard field goal (Drive: 15 plays, 60 yards, 7:41; Nebraska 27–22)

Statistics	NEB	IU
First downs	17	18
Total yards	360	333
Rushes/yards	45–152	30–88
Passing yards	208	245
Passing: Comp–Att–Int	10–26–2	24–39–2
Time of possession	32:56	27:04

Team	Category	Player	Statistics
Nebraska	Passing	Tommy Armstrong Jr.	10/26, 208 yards, TD, 2 INT
Nebraska	Rushing	Terrell Newby	22 carries, 102 yards, TD
Nebraska	Receiving	Stanley Morgan Jr.	3 receptions, 93 yards, TD
Indiana	Passing	Richard Lagow	19/32, 196 yards, TD, 2 INT
Indiana	Rushing	Devine Redding	11 carries, 57 yards, TD
Indiana	Receiving	Mitchell Paige	9 receptions, 101 yards

=== At Northwestern ===
Indiana Hoosiers (3–3) at Northwestern Wildcats (3–3) – Game summary

Quarter	1	2	3	4	Total
Hoosiers	3	0	9	2	14
Wildcats	14	10	0	0	24

at Ryan Field • Evanston, Illinois

- Date: October 22, 2016
- Game time: 11:00 a.m. CST
- Game weather: Cloudy, 54 °F (12 °C)
- Game attendance: 35,417
- Referee: Don Willard
- TV announcers (BTN): Scott Graham (play-by-play), Jeremy Leman (analyst)
- Sources:IUHoosiers.com

Game information

First Quarter

- (11:37) NW – Solomon Vault 17-yard pass from Clayton Thorson, Jack Mitchell kick (Drive: 11 plays, 70 yards, 3:23; Northwestern 7–0)
- (8:39) NW – Austin Carr 34-yard pass from Clayton Thorson, Jack Mitchell kick (Drive: 5 plays, 75 yards, 1:14; Northwestern 14–0)
- (3:40) IU – Griffin Oakes 21-yard field goal (Drive: 9 plays, 50 yards, 2:17; Northwestern 14–3)

Second Quarter

- (14:51) NW – Macan Wilson 32-yard pass from Clayton Thorson, Jack Mitchell kick (Drive: 9 plays, 79 yards, 3:42; Northwestern 21–3)
- (0:00) NW – Jack Mitchell 19-yard field goal (Drive: 9 plays, 58 yards, 1:06; Northwestern 24–3)

Third Quarter

- (11:19) IU – Griffin Oakes 30-yard field goal (Drive: 12 plays, 63 yards, 3:41; Northwestern 24–6)
- (2:49) IU – Nick Westbrook-Ikhine 3-yard run (Drive: 11 plays, 88 yards, 3:32; Northwestern 24–12)

Fourth Quarter

- (0:23) IU – Team safety (Drive: 4 plays, -6 yards, 1:43; Northwestern 24–14)

Statistics	IU	NW
First downs	23	26
Total yards	401	408
Rushes/yards	27–84	44–123
Passing yards	317	285
Passing: Comp–Att–Int	35–59–2	24–44–0
Time of possession	28:52	31:08

Team	Category	Player	Statistics
Indiana	Passing	Richard Lagow	35/59, 317 yards, 2 INT
Indiana	Rushing	Devine Redding	16 carries, 42 yards
Indiana	Receiving	Nick Westbrook-Ikhine	10 receptions, 126 yards
Northwestern	Passing	Clayton Thorson	24/43, 285 yards, 3 TD
Northwestern	Rushing	Justin Jackson	28 carries, 94 yards
Northwestern	Receiving	Austin Carr	7 receptions, 125 yards, TD

=== vs Maryland ===
Maryland Terrapins (5–2) vs Indiana Hoosiers (3–4) – Game summary

Quarter	1	2	3	4	Total
Terrapins	7	14	3	12	36
Hoosiers	13	3	13	13	42

at Memorial Stadium • Bloomington, Indiana

- Date: October 29, 2016
- Game time: 3:30 p.m.
- Game weather: Sunny, 77 °F (25 °C)
- Game attendance: 38,291
- Referee: John O'Neill
- TV announcers (ESPNU): Eamon McAnaney (play-by-play), John Congemi (analyst)
- Sources:IUHoosiers.com

Game information

First Quarter

- (6:18) IU – Zander Diamont 11-yard run (Drive: 11 plays, 85 yards, 3:21; Indiana 6–0)
- (1:44) IU – Devine Redding 1-yard run, Griffin Oakes kick (Drive: 10 plays, 91 yards, 3:56; Indiana 13–0)
- (1:01) MARY – Ty Johnson 66-yard run, Adam Greene kick (Drive: 3 plays, 75 yards, 0:43; Indiana 13–7)

Second Quarter

- (11:51) IU – Griffin Oakes 20-yard field goal (Drive: 13 plays, 82 yards, 4:10; Indiana 16–7)
- (8:22) MARY – Perry Hills 1-yard run, Adam Greene kick (Drive: 10 plays, 65 yards, 3:29; Indiana 16–14)
- (0:30) MARY – D. J. Moore 23-yard pass from Perry Hills, Adam Greene kick (Drive: 7 plays, 69 yards, 2:33; Maryland 21–16)

Third Quarter

- (6:38) IU – Richard Lagow 5-yard run, Griffin Oakes kick (Drive: 10 plays, 87 yards, 2:43; Indiana 23–21)
- (1:11) MARY – Adam Greene 32-yard field goal (Drive: 12 plays, 61 yards, 5:27; Maryland 24–23)
- (0:00) IU – Mitchell Paige 15-yard run (Drive: 5 plays, 75 yards, 1:11; Indiana 29–24)

Fourth Quarter

- (8:30) IU – Tyler Natee 2-yard run (Drive: 2 plays, 9 yards, 0:27; Indiana 35–24)
- (3:51) MARY – Perry Hills 5-yard run (Drive: 13 plays, 65 yards, 4:39; Indiana 35–30)
- (0:49) IU – Zander Diamont 2-yard run, Griffin Oakes kick (Drive: 6 plays, 75 yards, 3:02; Indiana 42–30)
- (0:00) MARY – Teldrick Morgan 5-yard pass from Perry Hills (Drive: 7 plays, 75 yards, 0:49; Indiana 42–36)

Statistics	MARY	IU
First downs	29	34
Total yards	517	650
Rushes/yards	50–269	57–414
Passing yards	248	236
Passing: Comp–Att–Int	22–34–1	17–26–0
Time of possession	32:15	27:45

Team	Category	Player	Statistics
Maryland	Passing	Perry Hills	22/33, 248 yards, 2 TD, INT
Maryland	Rushing	Ty Johnson	13 carries, 142 yards, TD
Maryland	Receiving	D. J. Moore	5 receptions, 81 yards, TD
Indiana	Passing	Richard Lagow	16/25, 207 yards
Indiana	Rushing	Devine Redding	17 carries, 130 yards, TD
Indiana	Receiving	Ricky Jones	4 receptions, 77 yards

=== At Rutgers ===
Indiana Hoosiers (4–4) at Rutgers Scarlet Knights (2–6) – Game summary

Quarter	1	2	3	4	Total
Hoosiers	13	0	13	7	33
Scarlet Knights	10	7	7	3	27

at High Point Solutions Stadium • Piscataway, New Jersey

- Date: November 5, 2016
- Game time: 12:00 p.m.
- Game weather: Sunny, 61 °F (16 °C)
- Game attendance: 37,345
- Referee: Daniel Capron
- TV announcers (BTN): Wayne Randazzo (play-by-play), Jeremy Leman (analyst)
- Sources:IUHoosiers.com

Game information

First Quarter

- (11:29) IU – Zander Diamont 59-yard run, Griffin Oakes kick (Drive: 4 plays, 71 yards, 1:13; Indiana 7–0)
- (11:12) RUTG – Andre Patton 68-yard pass from Giovanni Rescigno, David Bonagura kick (Drive: 1 play, 68 yards, 0:10; Tied 7–7)
- (9:56) IU – Ricky Jones 36-yard pass from Richard Lagow (Drive: 5 plays, 85 yards, 1:04; Indiana 13–7)
- (6:36) RUTG – David Bonagura 32-yard field goal (Drive: 9 plays, 61 yards, 3:20; Indiana 13–10)

Second Quarter

- (4:33) RUTG – Darnell Davis 75-yard fumble return, David Bonagura kick (Drive: 3 plays, 21 yards, 1:13; Rutgers 17–13)

Third Quarter

- (13:55) RUTG – Giovanni Rescigno 1-yard run, David Bonagura kick (Drive: 4 plays, 21 yards, 1:01; Rutgers 24–13)
- (6:32) IU – Camion Patrick 40-yard pass from Richard Lagow, Griffin Oakes kick (Drive: 3 plays, 58 yards, 0:53; Rutgers 24–20)
- (2:01) IU – Devine Redding 34-yard run (Drive: 2 plays, 53 yards, 0:22; Indiana 26–24)

Fourth Quarter

- (5:07) IU – Devine Redding 10-yard pass from Richard Lagow, Griffin Oakes kick (Drive: 9 plays, 48 yards, 3:48; Indiana 33–24)
- (0:12) RUTG – David Bonagura 20-yard field goal (Drive: 8 plays, 83 yards, 1:02; Indiana 33–27)

Statistics	IU	RUTG
First downs	27	13
Total yards	567	351
Rushes/yards	44–147	34–93
Passing yards	420	258
Passing: Comp–Att–Int	29–41–2	19–36–0
Time of possession	32:45	27:15

Team	Category	Player	Statistics
Indiana	Passing	Richard Lagow	28/40, 394 yards, 3 TD, 2 INT
Indiana	Rushing	Devine Redding	18 carries, 73 yards, TD
Indiana	Receiving	Mitchell Paige	6 receptions, 100 yards
Rutgers	Passing	Giovanni Rescigno	19/36, 258 yards, TD
Rutgers	Rushing	Justin Goodwin	19 carries, 82 yards
Rutgers	Receiving	Jawuan Harris	8 receptions, 118 yards

=== vs No. 10 Penn State ===
No. 10 Penn State Nittany Lions (7–2) vs Indiana Hoosiers (5–4) – Game summary

Quarter	1	2	3	4	Total
No. 12 Nittany Lions	7	7	7	24	45
Hoosiers	0	14	10	7	31

at Memorial Stadium • Bloomington, Indiana

- Date: November 12, 2016
- Game time: 12:00 p.m.
- Game weather: Sunny, 50 °F (10 °C)
- Game attendance: 40,678
- Referee: Mike Cannon
- TV announcers (ABC): Bob Wischusen (play-by-play), Brock Huard (analyst), Allison Williams (sideline)
- Sources:IUHoosiers.com

Game information

First Quarter

- (11:28) PSU – Trace McSorley 10-yard run, Tyler Davis kick (Drive: 7 plays, 60 yards, 3:32; Penn State 7–0)

Second Quarter

- (12:13) IU – Ricky Jones 5-yard pass from Richard Lagow, Griffin Oakes kick (Drive: 8 plays, 60 yards, 2:40; Tied 7–7)
- (4:43) PSU – Chris Godwin 6-yard pass from Trace McSorley, Tyler Davis kick (Drive: 1 play, 6 yards, 0:06; Penn State 14–7)
- (1:00) IU – Devine Redding 12-yard run, Griffin Oakes kick (Drive: 5 plays, 32 yards, 1:05; Tied 14–14)

Third Quarter

- (11:38) IU – Griffin Oakes 47-yard field goal (Drive: 9 plays, 52 yards, 3:32; Indiana 17–14)
- (3:13) IU – Devine Redding 6-yard run, Griffin Oakes kick (Drive: 5 plays, 74 yards, 1:41; Indiana 24–14)
- (1:09) PSU – Chris Godwin 21-yard pass from Trace McSorley, Tyler Davis kick (Drive: 4 plays, 70 yards, 2:04; Indiana 24–21)

Fourth Quarter

- (12:23) PSU – Saquon Barkley 4-yard run, Tyler Davis kick (Drive: 5 plays, 74 yards, 2:06; Penn State 28–24)
- (11:06) IU – Nick Westbrook-Ikhine 40-yard pass from Richard Lagow, Griffin Oakes kick (Drive: 7 plays, 75 yards, 1:17; Indiana 31–28)
- (3:58) PSU – Saquon Barkley 2-yard run, Tyler Davis kick (Drive: 7 plays, 57 yards, 2:53; Penn State 35–31)
- (1:07) PSU – Tyler Davis 39-yard field goal (Drive: 4 plays, 2 yards, 1:42; Penn State 38–31)
- (0:29) PSU – Torrence Brown 9-yard fumble return, Tyler Davis kick (Drive: 5 plays, -4 yards, 0:38; Penn State 45–31)

Statistics	PSU	IU
First downs	18	20
Total yards	409	454
Rushes/yards	45–77	41–110
Passing yards	332	344
Passing: Comp–Att–Int	16–30–2	24–41–0
Time of possession	33:39	26:21

Team	Category	Player	Statistics
Penn State	Passing	Trace McSorley	16/30, 332 yards, 2 TD, 2 INT
Penn State	Rushing	Saquon Barkley	33 carries, 58 yards, 2 TD
Penn State	Receiving	Mike Gesicki	5 receptions, 88 yards
Indiana	Passing	Richard Lagow	23/40, 292 yards, 2 TD
Indiana	Rushing	Devine Redding	23 carries, 108 yards, 2 TD
Indiana	Receiving	Camion Patrick	3 receptions, 91 yards

=== At No. 4 Michigan ===
Indiana Hoosiers (5–5) at No. 4 Michigan Wolverines (9–1) – Game summary

Quarter	1	2	3	4	Total
Hoosiers	0	7	3	0	10
No. 4 Wolverines	0	3	17	0	20

at Michigan Stadium • Ann Arbor, Michigan

- Date: November 19, 2016
- Game time: 3:35 p.m.
- Game weather: Cloudy, 39 °F (4 °C)
- Game attendance: 110,288
- Referee: Jerry McGinn
- TV announcers (ESPN): Dave Pasch (play-by-play), Greg McElroy (analyst), Tom Luginbill (sideline)
- Sources:IUHoosiers.com

Game information

First Quarter

None

Second Quarter

- (8:48) MICH – Kenny Allen 28-yard field goal (Drive: 8 plays, 34 yards, 4:14; Michigan 3–0)
- (4:19) IU – Camion Patrick 2-yard run, Griffin Oakes kick (Drive: 11 plays, 75 yards, 4:29; Indiana 7–3)

Third Quarter

- (9:40) MICH – Kenny Allen 33-yard field goal (Drive: 9 plays, 26 yards, 4:13; Indiana 7–6)
- (5:21) IU – Griffin Oakes 24-yard field goal (Drive: 11 plays, 68 yards, 4:19; Indiana 10–6)
- (4:02) MICH – De'Veon Smith 34-yard run, Kenny Allen kick (Drive: 4 plays, 66 yards, 1:19; Michigan 13–10)
- (0:29) MICH – De'Veon Smith 39-yard run, Kenny Allen kick (Drive: 2 plays, 39 yards, 0:14; Michigan 20–10)

Fourth Quarter

None

Statistics	IU	MICH
First downs	15	15
Total yards	255	284
Rushes/yards	36–64	50–225
Passing yards	191	59
Passing: Comp–Att–Int	14–30–0	7–16–0
Time of possession	25:39	34:21

Team	Category	Player	Statistics
Indiana	Passing	Richard Lagow	14/29, 191 yards
Indiana	Rushing	Devine Redding	22 carries, 50 yards
Indiana	Receiving	Nick Westbrook-Ikhine	4 receptions, 78 yards
Michigan	Passing	John O'Korn	7/16, 59 yards
Michigan	Rushing	De'Veon Smith	23 carries, 158 yards, 2 TD
Michigan	Receiving	Ty Isaac	1 reception, 21 yards

=== vs Purdue ===
Purdue Boilermakers (3–8) vs Indiana Hoosiers (5–6) – Game summary

Quarter	1	2	3	4	Total
Boilermakers	7	9	6	2	24
Hoosiers	14	3	0	9	26

at Memorial Stadium • Bloomington, Indiana

- Date: November 26, 2016
- Game time: 12:00 p.m.
- Game weather: Partly cloudy, 46 °F (8 °C)
- Game attendance: 43,103
- Referee: Ron Snodgrass
- TV announcers (ESPNU): Anish Shroff (play-by-play), Ahmad Brooks (analyst)
- Sources:IUHoosiers.com

Game information

First Quarter

- (14:12) PUR – Markell Jones 1-yard run, J. D. Dellinger kick (Drive: 1 play, 1 yard, 0:06; Purdue 7–0)
- (12:43) IU – Mitchell Paige 27-yard pass from Richard Lagow, Griffin Oakes kick (Drive: 5 plays, 68 yards, 1:25; Tied 7–7)
- (2:18) IU – Zander Diamont 1-yard run, Griffin Oakes kick (Drive: 10 plays, 80 yards, 4:07; Indiana 14–7)

Second Quarter

- (12:07) PUR – J. D. Dellinger 23-yard field goal (Drive: 14 plays, 39 yards, 5:03; Indiana 14–10)
- (7:36) IU – Griffin Oakes 29-yard field goal (Drive: 6 plays, 18 yards, 1:57; Indiana 17–10)
- (1:50) PUR – Cameron Posey 10-yard pass from David Blough (Drive: 5 plays, 36 yards, 1:11; Indiana 17–16)

Third Quarter

- (11:25) PUR – DeAngelo Yancey 31-yard pass from David Blough (Drive: 9 plays, 65 yards, 3:35; Purdue 22–17)

Fourth Quarter

- (14:17) IU – Griffin Oakes 46-yard field goal (Drive: 10 plays, 28 yards, 4:24; Purdue 22–20)
- (4:59) IU – Devine Redding 1-yard run (Drive: 11 plays, 61 yards, 4:41; Indiana 26–22)
- (0:02) PUR – Team safety (Drive: 4 plays, -20 yards, 1:06; Indiana 26–24)

Statistics	PUR	IU
First downs	20	17
Total yards	267	269
Rushes/yards	34–42	54–152
Passing yards	225	117
Passing: Comp–Att–Int	24–45–2	11–22–4
Time of possession	31:41	28:19

Team	Category	Player	Statistics
Purdue	Passing	David Blough	24/45, 225 yards, 2 TD, 2 INT
Purdue	Rushing	Markell Jones	22 carries, 35 yards, TD
Purdue	Receiving	DeAngelo Yancey	6 receptions, 78 yards, TD
Indiana	Passing	Richard Lagow	11/19, 117 yards, TD, 3 INT
Indiana	Rushing	Devine Redding	24 carries, 99 yards, TD
Indiana	Receiving	Nick Westbrook-Ikhine	1 reception, 44 yards

=== vs No. 19 Utah (Foster Farms Bowl) ===
No. 19 Utah Utes (8–4) vs Indiana Hoosiers (6–6) – Game summary
(2016 Foster Farms Bowl)

Quarter	1	2	3	4	Total
Hoosiers	7	10	0	7	24
No. 19 Utes	10	7	6	3	26

at Levi's Stadium • Santa Clara, CA

- Date: December 28, 2016
- Game time: 5:30 p.m. PST
- Game weather: Sunny, 59 °F (15 °C)
- Game attendance: 27,608
- Referee: David Smith
- TV announcers (FOX): Gus Johnson (play-by-play), Joel Klatt (analyst), Shannon Spake (sideline)
- Sources:IUHoosiers.com

Game information

First Quarter

- (14:08) IU – Mitchell Paige 7-yard pass from Richard Lagow, Griffin Oakes kick (Drive: 3 plays, 12 yards, 0:52; Indiana 7–0)
- (9:30) UTAH – Andy Phillips 30-yard field goal (Drive: 11 plays, 63 yards, 4:38; Indiana 7–3)
- (8:41) UTAH – Joe Williams 16-yard run, Andy Phillips kick (Drive: 1 play, 16 yards, 0:06; Utah 10–7)

Second Quarter

- (9:14) UTAH – Tyler Huntley 1-yard run, Andy Phillips kick (Drive: 9 plays, 95 yards, 5:29; Utah 17–7)
- (4:33) IU – Griffin Oakes 24-yard field goal (Drive: 5 plays, 54 yards, 1:18; Utah 17–10)
- (1:38) IU – Nick Westbrook-Ikhine 36-yard pass from Zander Diamont, Griffin Oakes kick (Drive: 8 plays, 64 yards, 2:35; Tied 17–17)

Third Quarter

- (5:40) UTAH – Andy Phillips 48-yard field goal (Drive: 10 plays, 34 yards, 5:10; Utah 20–17)
- (0:30) UTAH – Andy Phillips 48-yard field goal (Drive: 7 plays, 11 yards, 2:57; Utah 23–17)

Fourth Quarter

- (10:10) IU – Devine Redding 3-yard run, Griffin Oakes kick (Drive: 11 plays, 60 yards, 2:50; Indiana 24–23)
- (1:24) UTAH – Andy Phillips 27-yard field goal (Drive: 10 plays, 68 yards, 4:10; Utah 26–24)

Statistics	UTAH	IU
First downs	21	22
Total yards	470	341
Rushes/yards	52–256	37–117
Passing yards	214	224
Passing: Comp–Att–Int	12–24–1	15–40–1
Time of possession	35:23	24:37

Team	Category	Player	Statistics
Utah	Passing	Tyler Huntley	11/23, 178 yards, INT
Utah	Rushing	Joe Williams	26 carries, 222 yards, TD
Utah	Receiving	Demari Simpkins	4 receptions, 58 yards
Indiana	Passing	Richard Lagow	14/39, 188 yards, TD, INT
Indiana	Rushing	Devine Redding	17 carries, 72 yards, TD
Indiana	Receiving	Nick Westbrook-Ikhine	5 receptions, 80 yards, TD

== Roster ==
2016 Indiana Hoosiers football team roster
Players
Coaches
Offense

Pos.	#	Name	Class
WR	1	Simmie Cobbs	Jr
RB	2	Devonte Williams	Fr
QB	3	Peyton Ramsey	Fr
WR	4	Ricky Jones	Sr
WR	5	J-Shun Harris II	So
RB	6	Camion Patrick	Jr
WR	7	Taysir Mack	Fr
QB	9	Mike Fiacable	Fr
WR	10	Donavan Hale	So
QB	12	Zander Diamont	Jr
WR	13	Isaac James	Fr
WR	15	Nick Westbrook-Ikhine	So
QB	16	Austin King	Fr
WR	17	Justin Berry	Fr
WR	17	Isaac Griffith	Jr
QB	18	Danny Cameron	So
WR	19	Jonah Morris	Fr
RB	20	Cole Gest	Fr
QB	21	Richard Lagow	Jr
RB	23	Alex Rodriguez	So
RB	24	Mike Majette	So
WR	25	Kiante Enis	Fr
RB	31	Tyler Natee	Fr
WR	33	Ricky Brookins	So
RB	34	Devine Redding	Jr
WR	39	Chris Gajcak	Fr
RB	41	Clyde Newton	Sr
OL	51	Mackenzie Nworah	Fr
OL	52	DaVondre Love	Fr
OL	54	Coy Cronk	Fr
OL	56	Grayson Stover	Fr
OL	59	Jack Trainor	Fr
OL	61	Nick Ramacca	Fr
OL	62	Brandon Knight	So
OL	65	Wes Rogers	Sr
OL	67	Dan Feeney	Sr
OL	68	Hunter Littlejohn	Fr
OL	70	Jacob Bailey	Sr
OL	71	Delroy Baker	So
OL	72	Simon Stepaniak	Fr
OL	75	Alex Serrano	So
OL	76	Wes Martin	So
OT	77	Dimitric Camiel	Sr
TE	80	Ian Thomas	Jr
TE	81	Jordan Fuchs	Jr
WR	82	Luke Timian	So
TE	83	Austin Dorris	Fr
TE	84	Danny Friend	Jr
TE	85	Ryan Watercutter	So
WR	86	Marqui Hawkins	Jr
WR	87	Mitchell Paige	Sr
TE	88	Shaun Bonner	Fr

Defense

Pos.	#	Name	Class
LB	2	T. J. Simmons	Sr
DB	3	Tyler Green	So
LB	4	Chris Covington	Jr
DB	6	Zeke Walker	So
LB	8	Tegray Scales	Jr
DB	9	Jonathan Crawford	So
DB	12	Jayme Thompson	Jr
DB	13	Noel Padmore	Jr
DB	14	Andre Brown, Jr.	So
CB	16	Rashard Fant	Jr
DB	18	Ben Bach	Jr
S	19	Tony Fields	Jr
DB	20	Jameel Cook, Jr.	So
WR	21	Leon Thornton III	So
DB	22	Wesley Green	So
DB	23	Khalil Bryant	Fr
DB	26	Kiante Walton	So
DB	27	Arthur Jones	Jr
DB	28	A’Shon Riggins	Fr
LB	29	Dawson Fletcher	Sr
DB	30	Chase Dutra	Jr
DB	34	Thomas Henderson	Fr
LB	35	Nile Sykes	So
DB	36	Johnny Albomonte	Fr
DB	38	Jake Attar	Fr
LB	39	Kenny Arnold	So
LB	40	Reakwon Jones	Fr
DB	42	Marcelino McCrary-Ball	Fr
LB	43	Dameon Willis Jr.	So
LB	44	Marcus Oliver	Jr
LB	45	Tom Bolstad	Fr
DL	47	Robert McCray	Jr
DL	48	Omari Stringer	Fr
DL	49	Greg Gooch	Jr
DL	50	Joshua Brown	Fr
DL	51	Mike Barwick, Jr.	So
DL	54	Ja’Merez Bowen	So
DT	58	Patrick Dougherty	Jr
LB	60	Danny Banks	Jr
DL	69	Gavin Everett	Fr
DT	74	Nate Hoff	Jr
DL	90	Joe Belden	Fr
DL	91	Jocob Robinson	So
DL	93	Ralph Green III	Sr
DL	95	Brandon Wilson	Fr
DL	98	Jerome Johnson	Fr
DL	99	Allen Stallings IV	Fr

Special teams

Pos.	#	Name	Class
LS	31	James Halford	Sr
LS	60	Logan Robbins	Fr
P	88	Drew Conard	Fr
P	86	Joseph Gedeon	So
PK	90	Aaron Del Grosso	Jr
K	92	Griffin Oakes	Jr
LS	97	Dan Godsil	So

Head coach

- Kevin R. Wilson

Coordinators/assistant coaches

- Tom Allen (Associate head coach / Defense)
- Greg Frey (assistant head coach / ol)
- Mark Hagen (assistant defensive coordinator / dl)
- William Inge (Co-defensive Coord / LBs)
- Kevin Johns (offensive coord / qbs / wrs)
- Noah Joseph (S / Def. Recruiting Coord)
- Deland McCullough (RBs)
- James Patton (TEs / FBs / Off. Recruiting Coord)
- Brandon Shelby (CBs)
- Keith Caton (Head Strength & Conditioning)
- Brian Lepak (Graduate Asst - Offense)
- Billy Cosh (Graduate Asst – Offense)
- Kasey Teegardin (Grad Asst - Defense)
- Pat Kuntz (Grad Asst – Defense)
- Billy Ray Johnson (Asst AD Football Administration)
- Mike Pechac (Dir Player Dev & Academic Enhancement)
- Ryan McInerney (Quality Control - Recruiting/Def.)

Legend

- (C) Team captain
- (S) Suspended
- (I) Ineligible
- Injured
- Redshirt

Roster
Last update: August 30, 2016

== Awards and honors ==
=== Big Ten Players of the Week ===
Weekly Awards
Player	Award	Date Awarded	Ref.
Marcelino McCrary-Ball	Big Ten Freshman Player of the Week	September 12, 2016	
Marcus Oliver	Co-defensive Big Ten Player of the Week	October 29, 2016	
Tyler Natee	Big Ten Freshman Player of the Week	October 29, 2016	

=== Awards ===
Player	Award	Date Awarded	Ref.
Tegray Scales	Second team All-Big Ten	November 29, 2016	
Rashard Fant	Second team All-Big Ten	November 29, 2016	
Jacob Bailey	Big Ten Sportsmanship Award	November 29, 2016	
Dan Feeney	First team All-Big Ten	November 30, 2016	
Dan Feeney	First team All-American	December 12, 2016	
