= 2015 Indiana Hoosiers football team =

American college football season

2015 Indiana Hoosiers football

Pinstripe Bowl, L 41–44 ^{OT} vs. Duke
- Conference: Big Ten Conference
- East Division
- Record: 6–7 (2–6 Big Ten)
- Head coach: Kevin Wilson (5th season)
- Offensive coordinator: Kevin Johns (5th season)
- Offensive scheme: Spread
- Defensive coordinator: Brian Knorr (2nd season)
- Base defense: 3–4
- MVP: Nate Sudfeld
- Captains: Dan Feeney; Nick Mangieri; Marcus Oliver; Zack Shaw; Jason Spriggs; Nate Sudfeld
- Home stadium: Memorial Stadium

2015 Big Ten Conference football standings
	Conf.			Overall
Team	W		L	W		L
East Division
No. 6 Michigan State xy$^	7	–	1	12	–	2
No. 4 Ohio State x	7	–	1	12	–	1
No. 12 Michigan	6	–	2	10	–	3
Penn State	4	–	4	7	–	6
Indiana	2	–	6	6	–	7
Rutgers	1	–	7	4	–	8
Maryland	1	–	7	3	–	9
West Division
No. 9 Iowa xy	8	–	0	12	–	2
No. 23 Northwestern	6	–	2	10	–	3
No. 21 Wisconsin	6	–	2	10	–	3
Nebraska	3	–	5	6	–	7
Minnesota	2	–	6	6	–	7
Illinois	2	–	6	5	–	7
Purdue	1	–	7	2	–	10
Championship: Michigan State 16, Iowa 13
^ – College Football Playoff participant; $ – Conference champion; x – Division champion/co-champions; y – Championship game participant; Rankings from AP Poll

The 2015 Indiana Hoosiers football team represented Indiana University Bloomington during the 2015 NCAA Division I FBS football season. The Hoosiers competed in the East Division of the Big Ten Conference and played their home games at Memorial Stadium in Bloomington, Indiana. The team was led by head coach Kevin Wilson, who served in his fifth season. They finished the season 6–7, 2–6 in Big Ten play to finish in fifth place in the East Division. They were invited to the Pinstripe Bowl where they lost to Duke in overtime.

== Preseason ==
=== Recruits ===
College recruiting information (2015)
Name	Hometown	School	Height	Weight	Commit date
Joe Belden; DE	Avon, IN	Avon	6 ft 3 in (1.91 m)	250 lb (110 kg)	Jun 18, 2014
Joe Belden; DE	Recruit ratings: Scout: Rivals: 247Sports: ESPN:				
Andre Brown Jr. ATH	Decatur, GA	Columbia	6 ft 0 in (1.83 m)	187 lb (85 kg)	Aug 13, 2014
Andre Brown Jr. ATH	Recruit ratings: Scout: Rivals: 247Sports: ESPN:				
Jameel Cook Jr. DB	Missouri City, TX	Ridge Point	6 ft 0 in (1.83 m)	181 lb (82 kg)	Feb 1, 2015
Jameel Cook Jr. DB	Recruit ratings: Scout: Rivals: 247Sports: ESPN:				
Jonathan Crawford; S	Largo, FL	Largo	6 ft 2 in (1.88 m)	175 lb (79 kg)	Dec 18, 2014
Jonathan Crawford; S	Recruit ratings: Scout: Rivals: 247Sports: ESPN:				
Austin Dorris; TE	Shadyside, OH	Shadyside	6 ft 5 in (1.96 m)	220 lb (100 kg)	Jun 23, 2014
Austin Dorris; TE	Recruit ratings: Scout: Rivals: 247Sports: ESPN:				
Tyler Green; DB	Waldorf, MD	DeMatha Catholic	6 ft 3 in (1.91 m)	195 lb (88 kg)	Dec 14, 2014
Tyler Green; DB	Recruit ratings: Scout: Rivals: 247Sports: ESPN:				
Donavan Hale; ATH	Largo, FL	Largo	6 ft 3 in (1.91 m)	200 lb (91 kg)	Dec 18, 2014
Donavan Hale; ATH	Recruit ratings: Scout: Rivals: 247Sports: ESPN:				
Isaac James; ATH	Carmel, IN	Carmel	5 ft 11 in (1.80 m)	180 lb (82 kg)	Dec 14, 2014
Isaac James; ATH	Recruit ratings: Scout: Rivals: 247Sports: ESPN:				
Reakwon Jones; LB	Lynn Haven, FL	A. Crawford Mosley	6 ft 2 in (1.88 m)	205 lb (93 kg)	Jan 19, 2015
Reakwon Jones; LB	Recruit ratings: Scout: Rivals: 247Sports: ESPN:				
Austin King; QB	Alpharetta, GA	Alpharetta	6 ft 2 in (1.88 m)	190 lb (86 kg)	Dec 15, 2014
Austin King; QB	Recruit ratings: Scout: Rivals: 247Sports: ESPN:				
Brandon Knight; OL	Noblesville, IN	Noblesville	6 ft 5 in (1.96 m)	265 lb (120 kg)	Jun 22, 2014
Brandon Knight; OL	Recruit ratings: Scout: Rivals: 247Sports: ESPN:				
Hunter Littlejohn; OL	Powell, OH	Olentangy Liberty	6 ft 3 in (1.91 m)	285 lb (129 kg)	Jun 18, 2014
Hunter Littlejohn; OL	Recruit ratings: Scout: Rivals: 247Sports: ESPN:				
DaVondre Love; OL	St. Louis, MO	Affton	6 ft 7 in (2.01 m)	290 lb (130 kg)	Dec 14, 2014
DaVondre Love; OL	Recruit ratings: Scout: Rivals: 247Sports: ESPN:				
Mike Majette; ATH	Woodbridge, VA	Woodbridge Senior	5 ft 10 in (1.78 m)	195 lb (88 kg)	Dec 14, 2014
Mike Majette; ATH	Recruit ratings: Scout: Rivals: 247Sports: ESPN:				
Camion Patrick; WR	Knoxville, TN	East Mississippi CC	6 ft 2 in (1.88 m)	215 lb (98 kg)	Feb 4, 2015
Camion Patrick; WR	Recruit ratings: Scout: Rivals: 247Sports: ESPN:				
Jacob Robinson; DL	Westfield, IN	Westfield	6 ft 4 in (1.93 m)	235 lb (107 kg)	May 9, 2014
Jacob Robinson; DL	Recruit ratings: Scout: Rivals: 247Sports: ESPN:				
Simon Stepaniak; OL	Hamilton, OH	Ross	6 ft 4 in (1.93 m)	285 lb (129 kg)	May 3, 2014
Simon Stepaniak; OL	Recruit ratings: Scout: Rivals: 247Sports: ESPN:				
Omari Stringer; LB	Crete, IL	Crete-Monee	6 ft 4 in (1.93 m)	205 lb (93 kg)	Jun 30, 2014
Omari Stringer; LB	Recruit ratings: Scout: Rivals: 247Sports: ESPN:				
Leon Thornton III; WR	Lombard, IL	Montini Catholic	6 ft 1 in (1.85 m)	195 lb (88 kg)	Jun 11, 2014
Leon Thornton III; WR	Recruit ratings: Scout: Rivals: 247Sports: ESPN:				
Nick Westbrook-Ikhine; WR	Lake Mary, FL	Lake Mary	6 ft 3 in (1.91 m)	205 lb (93 kg)	Aug 16, 2014
Nick Westbrook-Ikhine; WR	Recruit ratings: Scout: Rivals: 247Sports: ESPN:				
Devonte Williams; RB	Columbia, MD	Bullis School	5 ft 10 in (1.78 m)	170 lb (77 kg)	Feb 2, 2015
Devonte Williams; RB	Recruit ratings: Scout: Rivals: 247Sports: ESPN:				
Brandon Wilson; DL	Winter Garden, FL	West Orange	6 ft 3 in (1.91 m)	240 lb (110 kg)	Jan 4, 2015
Brandon Wilson; DL	Recruit ratings: Scout: Rivals: 247Sports: ESPN:				
Overall recruit ranking: Scout: 56 Rivals: 48 247Sports: 50 ESPN: N/A
Note: In many cases, Scout, Rivals, 247Sports, On3, and ESPN may conflict in their listings of height and weight.; In these cases, the average was taken. ESPN grades are on a 100-point scale.; Sources: "2015 Indiana Football Commitments". Rivals.; "2015 Indiana Football Commits". Scout.; "ESPN – 2015 Indiana Football Commits". ESPN.; "Scout.com Team Recruiting Rankings". Scout.; "2015 Team Ranking". Rivals.com.

== Schedule ==
Indiana announced their 2015 football schedule on June 3, 2013. The 2015 schedule consist of 7 home and 5 away games in the regular season. The Hoosiers will host Big Ten foes Iowa, Michigan, Ohio State, and Rutgers and will travel to Maryland, Michigan State, Penn State, and Purdue.

The Hoosiers hosted three of their four non conference games against Florida International (FIU), Southern Illinois and Western Kentucky (WKU). Indiana traveled to Winston-Salem, North Carolina to face the Wake Forest Demon Deacons of the Atlantic Coast Conference on September 26.

Date	Time	Opponent	Site	TV	Result	Attendance
September 5	4:00 pm	Southern Illinois*	Memorial Stadium; Bloomington, IN	ESPNews	W 48–47	36,071
September 12	8:00 pm	FIU*	Memorial Stadium; Bloomington, IN	BTN	W 36–22	41,509
September 19	4:00 pm	Western Kentucky*	Memorial Stadium; Bloomington, IN	ESPNews	W 38–35	44,823
September 26	12:30 pm	at Wake Forest*	BB&T Field; Winston-Salem, NC	ACCN	W 31–24	22,508
October 3	3:30 pm	No. 1 Ohio State	Memorial Stadium; Bloomington, IN	ABC/ESPN2	L 27–34	52,929
October 10	12:00 pm	at Penn State	Beaver Stadium; University Park, PA	ESPN	L 7–29	97,873
October 17	3:30 pm	Rutgers^{†}	Memorial Stadium; Bloomington, IN	BTN	L 52–55	40,567
October 24	3:30 pm	at No. 7 Michigan State	Spartan Stadium; East Lansing, MI (rivalry)	ABC/ESPN2	L 26–52	74,144
November 7	3:30 pm	No. 10 Iowa	Memorial Stadium; Bloomington, IN	ESPN	L 27–35	44,739
November 14	3:30 pm	No. 15 Michigan	Memorial Stadium; Bloomington, IN	ABC/ESPN2	L 41–48 ^{2OT}	49,557
November 21	12:00 pm	at Maryland	Byrd Stadium; College Park, MD	BTN	W 47–28	33,685
November 28	12:00 pm	at Purdue	Ross–Ade Stadium; West Lafayette, IN (Old Oaken Bucket)	BTN	W 54–36	37,152
December 26	3:30 pm	vs. Duke*	Yankee Stadium; Bronx, NY (Pinstripe Bowl)	ABC	L 41–44 ^{OT}	37,218
*Non-conference game; ^{†}Homecoming; Rankings from AP Poll released prior to the game; All times are in Eastern time

== Game summaries ==
=== Purdue ===
Indiana Hoosiers (5–6) at Purdue Boilermakers (2–9)

Quarter	1	2	3	4	Total
Indiana	10	14	14	16	54
Purdue	7	7	14	8	36

at Ross-Ade Stadium • West Lafayette, Indiana

- Date: November 28
- Game time: 12:00 p.m. CDT
- Game weather: Overcast • 38 °F (3 °C) • Wind 9 mph (14 km/h) NNE
- Game attendance: 37,152
- Referee: John O'Neill
- TV: Big Ten Network
- Automated ScoreBook

Game information

Indiana

- Nate Sudfeld
  18/29, 350 Yds, 4 TD
- Devine Redding
  22 Rush, 144 Yds, TD
- Mitchell Paige
  5 Rec, 92 Yds, TD

Purdue

- Austin Appleby
  36/57, 332 Yds, 2 TD, 3 INT
- Markell Jones
  16 Rush, 96 Yds, TD
- Danny Anthrop
  9 Rec, 96 Yds

Scoring summary

Quarter	Time	Drive			Team	Scoring information	Score	
Quarter	Time	Plays	Yards	TOP	Team	Scoring information	IND	PUR
1	9:51	10	72	2:53	Indiana	Paige 23-yard touchdown reception from Sudfeld, Oakes kick good	7	0
1	6:01	5	21	1:14	Indiana	45-yard field goal by Oakes	10	0
1	0:00	6	78	1:44	Purdue	Appleby 1-yard touchdown run, Griggs kick good	10	7
2	12:46	7	75	2:14	Indiana	Redding 6-yard touchdown run, Oakes kick good	17	7
2	7:07	14	99	4:12	Indiana	Cobbs 15-yard touchdown reception from Sudfeld, Oakes kick good	24	7
2	3:12	12	75	3:55	Purdue	Jurasevich 11-yard touchdown reception from Appleby, Griggs kick good	24	14
3	13:38	6	75	1:22	Indiana	Sudfeld 3-yard touchdown run, Oakes kick good	31	14
3	4:28	14	76	5:46	Purdue	Herdman 2-yard touchdown reception from Appleby, Griggs kick good	31	21
3	1:57	9	50	2:31	Indiana	Wilson 1-yard touchdown run, Oakes kick good	38	21
3	0:19	6	75	1:38	Purdue	M. Jones 20-yard touchdown run, Griggs kick good	38	28
4	12:22	4	53	1:33	Indiana	Knight 22-yard touchdown reception from Sudfeld, Oakes kick no good	44	28
4	11:21	4	56	1:01	Purdue	Appleby 1-yard touchdown run, 2-point pass good	44	36
4	10:15	3	83	1:06	Indiana	Booker 72-yard touchdown reception from Sudfeld, Oakes kick good	51	36
4	5:31	5	36	0:57	Indiana	34-yard field goal by Oakes	54	36
"TOP" = time of possession. For other American football terms, see Glossary of American football.							54	36

== Roster ==
2015 Indiana Hoosiers football team roster
Players
Coaches
Offense

Pos.	#	Name	Class
WR	1	Simmie Cobbs	So
WR	3	Dominique Booth	So
WR	4	Ricky Jones	Jr
WR	5	J-Shun Harris II	So
WR	6	Camion Patrick	So
QB	7	Nate Sudfeld (C)	Sr
RB	8	Jordan Howard	Jr
QB	9	Nate Boudreau	So
QB	12	Zander Diamont	So
WR	14	Marqui Hawkins	So
WR	15	Nick Westbrook-Ikhine	Fr
QB	16	Austin King	Fr
WR	17	Isaac Griffith	So
QB	18	Danny Cameron	Fr
RB	21	Andrew Wilson	Jr
RB	23	Alex Rodriguez	Fr
WR	31	Andre Booker	Sr
RB	33	Ricky Brookins	Fr
RB	34	Devine Redding	So
WR	38	Damon Graham	Sr
WR	39	Chris Gajcak	Fr
C	50	Jake Reed	Sr
OL	52	DaVondre Love	Fr
OL	54	Ja'Merez Bowen	Fr
OL	57	Tim Gardner	Fr
OL	59	Jack Trainor	Fr
OL	62	Brandon Knight	Fr
OL	63	Tyler Lukens	Sr
C	65	Wes Rogers	Jr
OL	67	Dan Feeney (C)	Jr
OL	68	Hunter Littlejohn	Fr
OL	69	Blake Biesen	Fr
OL	70	Jacob Bailey	Jr
OL	71	Delroy Baker	Fr
OL	72	Simon Stepaniak	Fr
OL	75	DeAndre Herron	Jr
OL	76	Wes Martin	Fr
OT	77	Dimitric Camiel	Jr
OT	78	Jason Spriggs (C)	Sr
WR	80	Leon Thornton III	Fr
TE	81	Jordan Fuchs	So
WR	82	Luke Timian	Fr
TE	83	Austin Dorris	Fr
TE	84	Danny Friend	So
TE	85	Michael Cooper	Sr
WR	86	Chandler Miller	Jr
WR	87	Mitchell Paige	Jr
TE	88	Anthony Corsaro	Sr
TE	94	Sean Damaska	Jr

Defense

Pos.	#	Name	Class
LB	2	T. J. Simmons	Jr
DB	3	Tyler Green	Fr
LB	4	Chris Covington	So
ATH	5	Devonte Williams	Fr
LB	6	Zeke Walker	Fr
DB	7	Ben Bach	So
CB	7	Donovan Clark	So
LB	8	Tegray Scales	So
ATH	9	Jonathan Crawford	Fr
ATH	10	Donavan Hale	Fr
LB	12	Reakwon Jones	Fr
ATH	13	Isaac James	Fr
ATH	14	Andre Jr. Brown	Fr
CB	16	Rashard Fant	So
DB	18	Noel Padmore	So
S	19	Tony Fields	So
DB	20	Jameel Jr. Cook	Fr
DB	22	Wesley Green	Fr
ATH	24	Mike Majette	Fr
DB	25	Mario Swann	So
DB	26	Kiante Walton	So
DB	27	Arthur Jones	So
DB	28	Will Dawkins	Fr
LB	29	Dawson Fletcher	Jr
DB	30	Chase Dutra	So
LB	33	Zach Shaw (C)	Sr
LB	35	Nile Sykes	Fr
LB	37	Gabe Estes	Fr
LB	39	Kenny Arnold	Fr
LB	41	Clyde Newton	Jr
LB	43	Dameon Jr. Willis	Fr
LB	44	Marcus Oliver (C)	So
LB	45	Tony Thomas	Jr
LB	46	Ryan Watercutter	Fr
DL	47	Robert McCray	So
LB	48	Omari Stringer	Fr
LB	49	Greg Gooch	So
DL	51	Mike Jr. Barwick	Fr
DT	53	Shawn Heffern	Jr
DL	56	Nick Mangieri (C)	Sr
LB	57	Kyle Loechel	Fr
DT	58	Patrick Dougherty	So
DT	74	Nate Hoff	So
DL	90	Joe Belden	Fr
DL	91	Jocob Robinson	Fr
DT	93	Ralph Green III	Jr
LB	95	Brandon Wilson	Fr
DT	98	Darius Latham	Jr
DT	99	Adarius Rayner	Sr

Special teams

Pos.	#	Name	Class
P	36	Eric Toth	Sr
LS	42	Nolan Guedel	Fr
LS	66	Josh Pericht	So
P	86	Joseph Gedeon	Fr
K	87	Calob Meinzer	Fr
K	90	Aaron Del Grosso	So
K	92	Griffin Oakes	So
P	93	Nick Campos	Jr
LS	97	Dan Godsil	Fr

Head coach

- Kevin R. Wilson

Coordinators/assistant coaches

- Greg Frey (Co-Offensive Coord / OL)
- William Inge (Co-Defensive Coord / LBs)
- Kevin Johns (Offensive Coord / QBs / WRs)
- Noah Joseph (S / Def. Recruiting Coord)
- Brian Knorr (Defensive Coordinator)
- Deland McCullough (RBs)
- Larry McDaniel (DL)
- James Patton (TEs / FBs / Off. Recruiting Coord)
- Brandon Shelby (CBs)
- Mark Hill (Head Strength & Conditioning)
- Brian Lepak (Offensive Graduate Asst)
- Carter Whitson (Offensive Grad Asst)
- Kasey Teegardin (Defensive Grad Asst)
- Elliott Wratten (Defensive Grad Asst)
- Billy Ray Johnson (Asst AD Football Administration)
- Mike Pechac (Dir Player Dev & Academic Enhancement)
- Ryan McInerney (Quality Control - Recruiting/Def.)
- Courtney Messingham (Quality Control - Recruiting/Off.)

Legend

- (C) Team captain
- (S) Suspended
- (I) Ineligible
- Injured
- Redshirt

Roster
Last update: September 8, 2015

== 2016 NFL draftees ==
Player	Round	Pick	Position	NFL club
Jason Spriggs	2	48	OT	Green Bay Packers
Jordan Howard	5	150	RB	Chicago Bears
Nate Sudfeld	6	187	QB	Washington Redskins
