= 2016 Foster Farms Bowl =

- 15th Foster Farms Bowl
Indiana Hoosiers	Utah Utes
(6–6)	(8–4)
Big Ten	Pac-12
24	26
Head coach: Kevin Wilson	Head coach: Kyle Whittingham
	AP / Coaches / CFP; NR / 23 / 19
	1	2	3	4	Total
Indiana	7	10	0	7	24
Utah	10	7	6	3	26
- Date: December 28, 2016
- Season: 2016
- Stadium: Levi's Stadium
- Location: Santa Clara, California
- MVP: Offensive: Utah RB Joe Williams; Defensive: Indiana LB Tegray Scales
- Favorite: Utah by 8
- National anthem: Felisha Dias
- Referee: David Smith (SEC)
- Attendance: 27,608
- Payout: US$2,584,286

United States TV coverage
- Network: Fox
- Announcers: Gus Johnson (Play-by-Play); Joel Klatt (Color Analyst); Shannon Spake (Sideline Reporter)

The 2016 Foster Farms Bowl was an American college football bowl game played on December 28, 2016, at Levi's Stadium in Santa Clara, California. It was one of the 2016–17 bowl games concluding the 2016 FBS football season. The 15th edition of the Foster Farms Bowl, the game featured the Utah Utes from the Pac-12 Conference against the Indiana Hoosiers from the Big Ten Conference.

The 2016 edition was the first under its new management, as it is now run by the San Francisco 49ers NFL team.

== Team selection ==
The game featured conference tie-ins with teams from the Pac-12 Conference and the Big Ten Conference.

=== Utah ===
The Utes finished their regular season 8-4 and accepted an invitation to play in the Foster Farms Bowl. This was Utah's second trip to the Foster Farms Bowl, with the previous appearance being during the 2005–06 bowl season when they won against Georgia Tech by a score of 38–10 in the 2005 Emerald Bowl.

=== Indiana ===
After finishing their season 6–6, the Hoosiers received an invitation to play in the Foster Farms Bowl, which they accepted. This bowl marked the Hoosiers' eleventh bowl game (they were 3–7 in bowl games previously) and they were seeking their first bowl victory since the 1991 Copper Bowl, when they shut out Baylor 24–0.

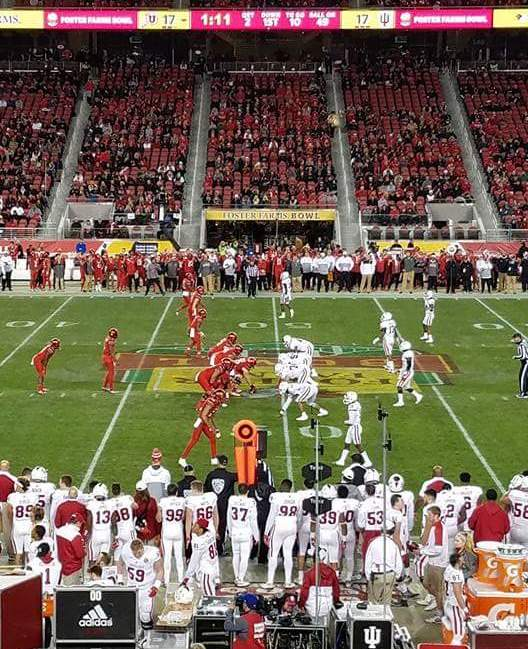
2016 Foster Farms Bowl - Indiana vs. Utah

== Game summary ==
=== Scoring summary ===
Scoring summary

Quarter	Time	Drive			Team	Scoring information	Score	
Quarter	Time	Plays	Yards	TOP	Team	Scoring information	IND	UTAH
1	14:08	3	11	0:47	IND	Mitchell Paige 7-yard touchdown reception from Richard Lagow, Griffin Oakes kick good	7	0
1	9:30	11	63	4:38	UTAH	30-yard field goal by Andy Phillips	7	3
1	8:41	1	16	0:07	UTAH	Joe Williams 16-yard touchdown run, Andy Phillips kick good	7	10
2	9:14	9	95	5:29	UTAH	Tyler Huntley 1-yard touchdown run, Andy Phillips kick good	7	17
2	4:33	5	54	1:18	IND	24-yard field goal by Griffin Oakes	10	17
2	1:38	8	64	2:35	IND	Nick Westbrook 36-yard touchdown reception from Zander Diamont, Griffin Oakes kick good	17	17
3	5:40	10	34	5:10	UTAH	48-yard field goal by Andy Phillips	17	20
3	0:30	7	11	2:57	UTAH	41-yard field goal by Andy Phillips	17	23
4	10:10	10	60	2:50	IND	Devine Redding 3-yard touchdown run, Griffin Oakes kick good	24	23
4	1:24	10	68	4:10	UTAH	27-yard field goal by Andy Phillips	24	26
"TOP" = time of possession. For other American football terms, see Glossary of American football.							24	26

=== Statistics ===
Statistics	IND	Utah
First downs	22	21
Plays–yards	77–341	76–470
Rushes–yards	37–117	52–256
Passing yards	224	214
Passing: Comp–Att–Int	15-40-1	12-24-1
Time of possession	24:37	35:23

Team	Category	Player	Statistics
IND	Passing	Richard Lagow	14/39, 188 yds, 1 TD, 1 INT
IND	Rushing	Devine Redding	17 car, 72 yds, 1 TD
IND	Receiving	Nick Westbrook	5 rec, 80 yds, 1 TD
Utah	Passing	Troy Williams	11/23, 178 yds, 1 INT
Utah	Rushing	Joe Williams	26 car, 222 yds, 1 TD
Utah	Receiving	Demari Simpkins	4 rec, 58 yds

== Media ==
The 2016 Foster Farms Bowl was the first broadcast under a new deal with Fox News.

Levi's Stadium was equipped for Intel freeD instant replay technology (previously used by CBS during Super Bowl 50 at the stadium earlier in the year) in order to facilitate testing for Be the Player – a new instant replay feature Fox planned to use during Super Bowl LI to present first-person perspectives of plays.
