= Joe Williams (running back, born 1993) =

American football player (born 1993)

No. 32
- Position: Running back

Personal information
- Born: September 4, 1993 (age 33); Allentown, Pennsylvania, U.S.
- Listed height: 5 ft 11 in (1.80 m)
- Listed weight: 205 lb (93 kg)

Career information
- High school: Emmaus (Emmaus, Pennsylvania)
- College: Utah
- NFL draft: 2017: 4th round, 121st overall pick

Career history
- San Francisco 49ers (2017)

Awards and highlights
- 2016 Foster Farms Bowl Offensive MVP
- Stats at Pro Football Reference

Joseph Sterling Williams (born September 4, 1993) is an American former professional football player who was a running back in the National Football League (NFL). He played college football for the Utah Utes. He was selected in the fourth round, 121st overall, by the San Francisco 49ers in the 2017 NFL draft.

== Early life ==
Williams was born in Allentown, Pennsylvania. He played high school football at Emmaus High School in the competitive Eastern Pennsylvania Conference in the Lehigh Valley region of eastern Pennsylvania.

== College career ==
Williams committed to the University of Connecticut in 2012 before transferring to ASA College in New York City. In 2015, he transferred to Utah but retired after a year to focus on other aspects of his life. On October 22, 2016, however, he returned to it, setting the University of Utah's all-time record for rushing yards in a single game with 332 yards rushing against UCLA.

In the 2016 Foster Farms Bowl against Indiana, Williams was awarded Offensive Most Valuable Player in a game where he rushed for 222 yards, scored a rushing touchdown, and accumulated 56 receiving yards. In the 2016 season at Utah, Williams rushed for 1,407 yards and ten rushing touchdowns in just nine games.

== Professional career ==
In the 2017 NFL draft, Williams was drafted by the San Francisco 49ers in the fourth round with the 121st overall selection. He was the 11th running back selected in that year's draft. On September 2, 2017, he was placed on injured reserve with an ankle injury.

On August 31, 2018, Williams was waived by the 49ers.
