= Tegray Scales =

American football player (born 1996)

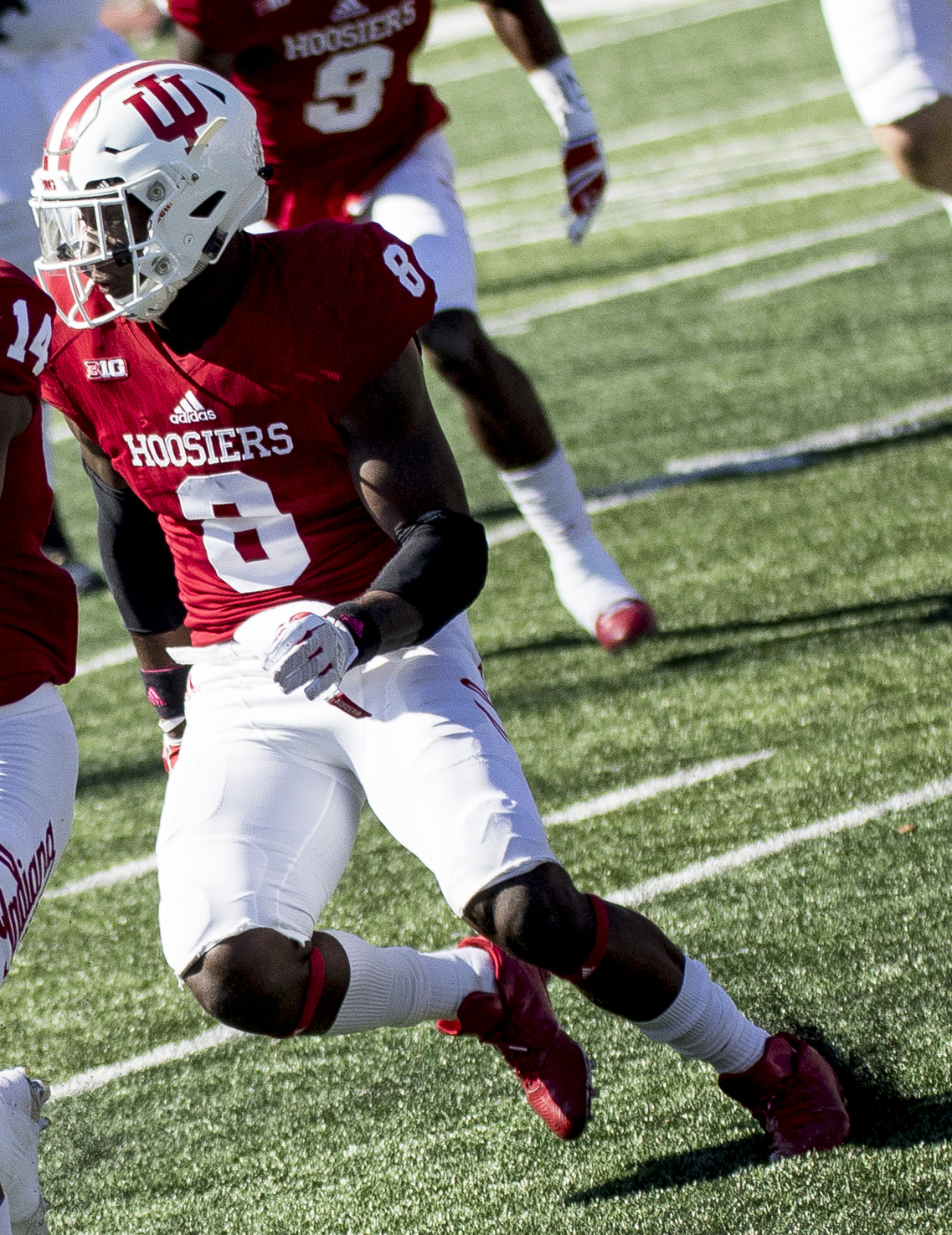
- Scales with Indiana in 2017

No. 40, 30
- Position: Linebacker

Personal information
- Born: May 10, 1996 (age 30); Cincinnati, Ohio, U.S.
- Listed height: 6 ft 0 in (1.83 m)
- Listed weight: 230 lb (104 kg)

Career information
- High school: Colerain (Cincinnati)
- College: Indiana
- NFL draft: 2018: undrafted

Career history
- Los Angeles Rams (2018)*; Indianapolis Colts (2018)*; Pittsburgh Steelers (2019)*; Dallas Renegades (2020); Tampa Bay Buccaneers (2020)*; Pittsburgh Steelers (2020); Cleveland Browns (2021)*; Saskatchewan Roughriders (2021)*; Cincinnati Bengals (2021)*; Pittsburgh Steelers (2021); Houston Gamblers (2022); Cincinnati Bengals (2022)*; Orlando Guardians (2023)
- * Offseason or practice squad member only

Awards and highlights
- First-team All-Big Ten (2017)

Career NFL statistics
- Games played: 5
- Stats at Pro Football Reference

Tegray Rene Scales (born May 10, 1996) is an American former professional football player who was a linebacker in the National Football League (NFL). He played college football for the Indiana Hoosiers.

== Early life ==
Scales attended Colerain High School in Cincinnati, Ohio, and was a three-year football and four year wrestling letterman. Following his senior year at Colerain, Scales was an Associated Press Division I state co-defensive player of the year, Southwest District defensive player of the year and the Greater Miami Conference co-defensive player of the year and was nominated for the 2013 U.S. Army All-American Bowl.

Scales received offers from Minnesota, Boston College, Illinois, Indiana, Louisville, Marshall, Ohio, Oklahoma, West Virginia and Western Michigan. He committed to Indiana on January 19, 2014.

College recruiting
Name	Hometown	School	Height	Weight	Commit date
Tegray Scales; OLB	Cincinnati, Ohio	Colerain High School	6 ft 0 in (1.83 m)	206 lb (93 kg)	Jan 19, 2014
Tegray Scales; OLB	Recruit ratings: Scout: Rivals: (77)				
Overall recruit ranking: Scout: 32 (OLB), 4 (OH OLB) Rivals: 34 (OLB) ESPN: 62 (OLB), 35 (OH)
Note: In many cases, Scout, Rivals, 247Sports, On3, and ESPN may conflict in their listings of height and weight.; In these cases, the average was taken. ESPN grades are on a 100-point scale.; Sources: "2014 Team Ranking". Rivals.com.

== College career ==
Scales started all 12 games for the Hoosiers as a freshman, recording 46 tackles, 2 sacks, and 3 interceptions. His first interception came against North Texas, while his first sack was on Missouri Tigers' quarterback Maty Mauk, in the Hoosiers first victory against a ranked opponent since 2006. Scales was named Big Ten co-Freshman of the Week for his performance against Missouri.

Following the 2014 season, Scales was named to the 247Sports.com True Freshman All-American Team, the Scout.com 2014 Freshman All-America Second-team, and the BTN.com and 247sports.com All-Big Ten Freshman teams.

Scales was one of a group Hoosier players suspended for the 2015 opener against Southern Illinois for disciplinary reasons, and he was the only member of the group to remain suspended for Indiana's second game against Florida International. Scales was selected as the IU Defensive Player of the Week for his performance in week 3 against Wake Forest. Scales played in 9 of Indiana's 12 regular season games for the 2015 season, as well as played in the 2015 Pinstripe Bowl. He recorded 53 tackles, 3 sacks and 2 interceptions during the regular season.

Scales recorded 123 tackles, 7 sacks and 1 interception for the 2016 season, including being selected as the Foster Farms Bowl Defensive Most Valuable Player in the 2016 Foster Farms Bowl. On November 29, 2016, Scales was named Third-team All-Big Ten by the coaches and Second-team All-Big Ten by the media.

On January 9, 2017, Scales announced that he would return to the Hoosiers for his senior season. On May 17, 2017, Scales was named one of 42 players to the 2017 Lott IMPACT Trophy Watch List.

== Professional career ==
Pre-draft measurables
Height	Weight	Arm length	Hand span	40-yard dash	10-yard split	20-yard split	Vertical jump	Bench press
6 ft 0 3/8 in (1.84 m)	230 lb (104 kg)	30 3/4 in (0.78 m)	8 5/8 in (0.22 m)	4.77 s	1.59 s	2.77 s	35.0 in (0.89 m)	27 reps

=== Los Angeles Rams ===
Scales signed with the Los Angeles Rams as an undrafted free agent on May 2, 2018. He was waived on August 31, 2018.

=== Indianapolis Colts ===
On December 18, 2018, Scales was signed to the Indianapolis Colts practice squad. He was released on December 31, 2018.

=== Pittsburgh Steelers (first stint) ===
On January 4, 2019, Scales signed a reserve/future contract with the Pittsburgh Steelers. He was waived on August 31, 2019.

=== Dallas Renegades ===
Scales was selected by the Dallas Renegades in the ninth round of the 2020 XFL draft. He had his contract terminated when the league suspended operations on April 10, 2020.

=== Tampa Bay Buccaneers ===
On October 13, 2020, Scales was signed to the Tampa Bay Buccaneers practice squad. He was released on October 27.

=== Pittsburgh Steelers (second stint) ===
On November 11, 2020, the Steelers signed Scales to their practice squad. He was elevated to the active roster on December 12 and December 21 for the team's weeks 14 and 15 games against the Buffalo Bills and Cincinnati Bengals, and reverted to the practice squad after each game. He was signed to the active roster on December 26, 2020. He was waived on January 9, 2021, and signed a reserve/futures contract with the team on January 14. He was waived on August 14.

=== Cleveland Browns ===
On August 25, 2021, Scales signed with the Cleveland Browns. Scales was waived by the Browns on August 31, 2021.

=== Saskatchewan Roughriders ===
On November 25, 2021, Scales signed with the Saskatchewan Roughriders of the Canadian Football League (CFL). He spent on the practice roster and was released December 6, 2021.

=== Cincinnati Bengals (first stint) ===
On December 21, 2021, Scales was signed to the Cincinnati Bengals' practice squad.

=== Pittsburgh Steelers (third stint) ===
On January 1, 2022, the Steelers signed Scales to their active roster off the Bengals practice squad. On May 10, 2022, Scales was waived by the Steelers.

=== Houston Gamblers ===
Scales signed with the Houston Gamblers of the United States Football League (USFL) on May 19, 2022.

=== Cincinnati Bengals (second stint) ===
On July 25, 2022, Scales signed with the Bengals. He was waived on August 30, 2022 and signed to the practice squad the next day. He was cut from the practice squad on November 21.

=== Orlando Guardians ===
The Orlando Guardians selected Scales in the third round of the 2023 XFL Supplemental Draft on January 1, 2023. He was placed on the reserve list by the team on March 15, 2023, and activated on April 7. The Guardians folded when the XFL and USFL merged to create the United Football League (UFL).

=== NFL career statistics ===
Regular season				Tackles				Interceptions						Fumbles		
Year	Team	GP	GS	Comb	Solo	Ast	Sck	PDef	Int	Yds	Avg	Lng	TD	FF	FR	TD
2020	PIT	4	0	0	0	0	0.0	0	0	0	0	0	0	0	0	0
Career		4	0	0	0	0	0.0	0	0	0	0.0	0	0	0	0	0

== Personal life ==
Tegray is the son of Herman Scales and Kathy Wilkerson.

== See also ==
- List of NCAA major college football yearly tackles leaders
