= Nick Westbrook-Ikhine =

American football player (born 1997)

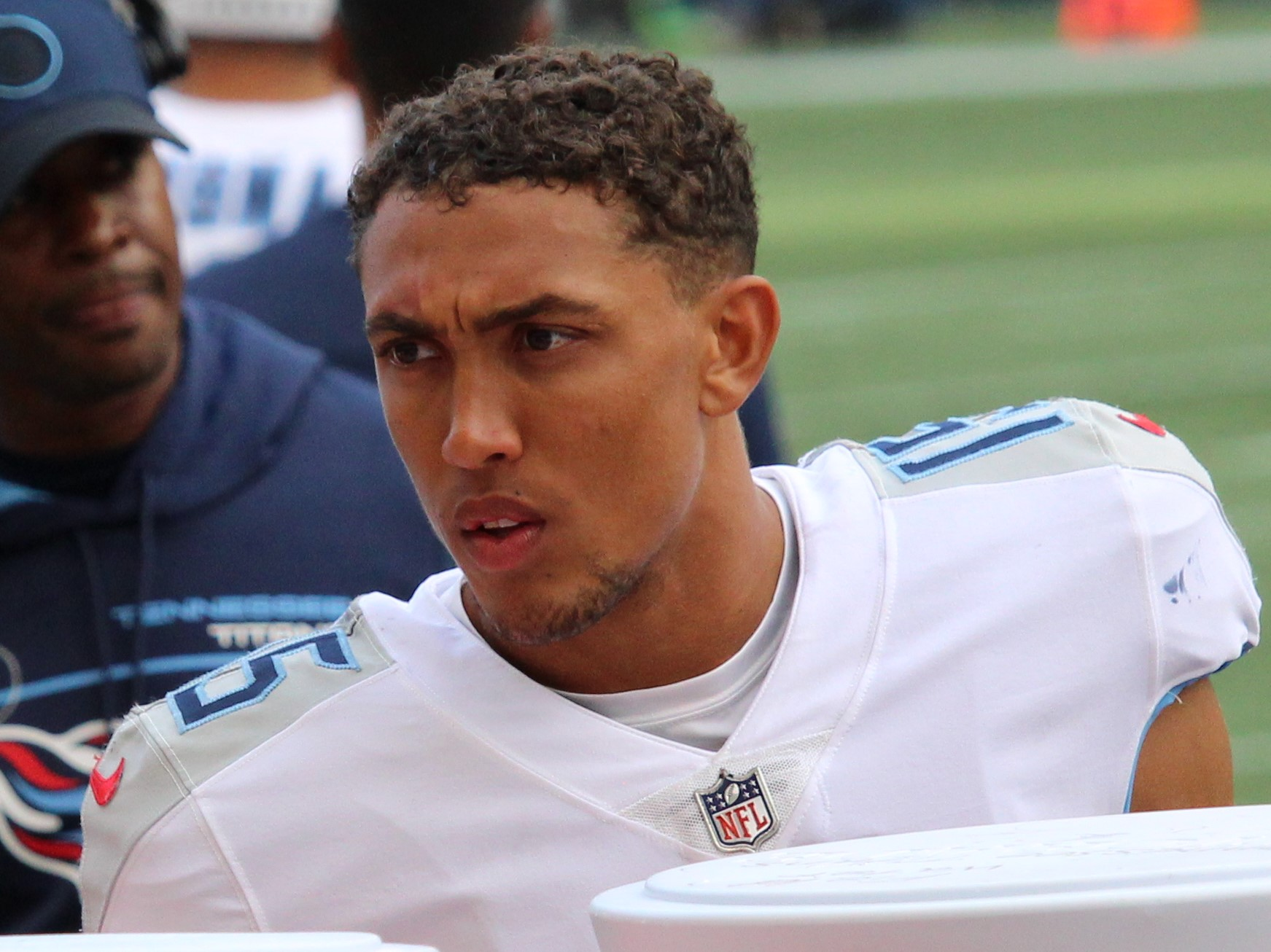
- Westbrook-Ikhine with the Tennessee Titans in 2021

No. 12 – Indianapolis Colts
- Position: Wide receiver
- Roster status: Active

Personal information
- Born: March 21, 1997 (age 29); Lake Mary, Florida, U.S.
- Listed height: 6 ft 2 in (1.88 m)
- Listed weight: 211 lb (96 kg)

Career information
- High school: Lake Mary
- College: Indiana (2015–2019)
- NFL draft: 2020: undrafted

Career history
- Tennessee Titans (2020–2024); Miami Dolphins (2025); Indianapolis Colts (2026–present)

Career NFL statistics as of Week 5, 2026
- Receptions: 137
- Receiving yards: 1,862
- Receiving touchdowns: 19
- Stats at Pro Football Reference

Nicholas Westbrook (born March 21, 1997), known professionally as Nick Westbrook-Ikhine eh-KEE-nay, or simply "NWI", is an American professional football wide receiver for the Indianapolis Colts of the National Football League (NFL). He played college football for the Indiana Hoosiers and signed with the Tennessee Titans as an undrafted free agent in 2020.

== Early life ==
Westbrook-Ikhine grew up in Lake Mary, Florida, and attended Lake Mary High School. As a junior, he caught 52 passes for 826 yards and 13 touchdowns. As a senior, Westbrook-Ihkine was named first-team all-state, all-district, and All-Central Florida after recording 84 receptions for 1,853 yards and 21 touchdowns. He also lettered in track and field and lacrosse.

== College career ==
Westbrook-Ikhine was a member of the Indiana Hoosiers for five seasons. He had six receptions for 69 yards and a touchdown as a true freshman.

As a sophomore, Westbrook-Ikhine caught 54 passes for 995 yards (18.4 yards per catch) and six touchdowns.

Westbrook-Ikhine tore his ACL during the first play of his junior year and used a medical redshirt.

The following season, Westbrook-Ikhine led Indiana with 42 receptions for 590 yards and four touchdowns.

As a redshirt senior, Westbrook-Ikhine had 42 receptions for 572 yards and five touchdowns.

Westbrook-Ikhine finished his collegiate career with 144 receptions for 2,226 yards and 16 touchdowns in 52 games and 36 starts.

Westbrook-Ikhine graduated from Indiana in December 2019 with a business marketing degree.

== Professional career ==
Pre-draft measurables
Height	Weight	Arm length	Hand span	Wingspan
6 ft 2 5/8 in (1.90 m)	211 lb (96 kg)	32 5/8 in (0.83 m)	9 in (0.23 m)	6 ft 6 3/8 in (1.99 m)
All values from Pro Day

=== Tennessee Titans ===
==== 2020 season ====
Westbrook-Ikhine was signed by the Tennessee Titans as an undrafted free agent on April 26, 2020. He was waived at the end of training camp during final roster cuts on September 5, but was signed by to the practice squad the next day.

Westbrook-Ikhine was elevated to the active roster on September 14 for the team's Week 1 matchup against the Denver Broncos and was reverted back to the practice squad the next day. He was promoted to the active roster on September 16, 2020. During a Week 5 42–16 victory over the Buffalo Bills, Westbrook-Ihkine recorded his first NFL reception on a seven-yard pass from Ryan Tannehill. In the next game against the Houston Texans, Westbrook-Ihkine scored a two-point conversion during the 42–36 overtime victory.

Westbrook-Ikhine finished his rookie season with three receptions for 33 yards and a two-point conversion in 14 games and one start. The Titans finished atop the AFC South with an 11–5 record and qualified for the playoffs. During the Wild Card Round against the Baltimore Ravens, Westbrook-Ihkine had two receptions for 17 yards in the 20–13 loss.

==== 2021 season ====
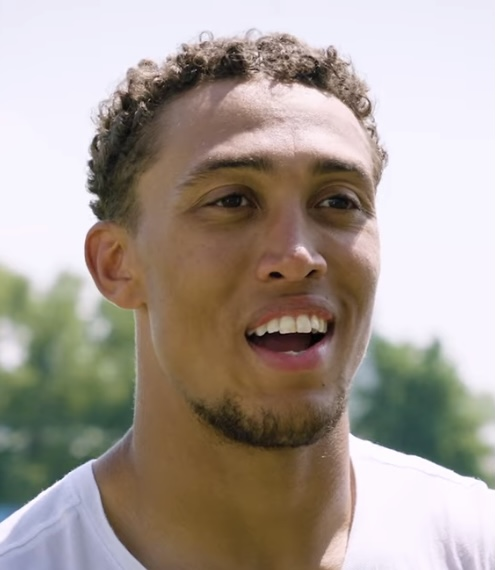
Westbrook-Ikhine in 2021

During a Week 3 25–16 victory over the Indianapolis Colts, Westbrook-Ikhine caught four passes for 53 yards and his first NFL touchdown. During a Week 8 34–31 overtime road victory against the Colts, Westbrook-Ihkine had two receptions for 16 yards and a touchdown. Three weeks later against the Texans, he had his first career 100-yard game that saw injuries down fellow receivers Marcus Johnson and A. J. Brown. Westbrook-Ihkine finished the 22–13 loss with seven receptions for 107 yards. In the next game against the New England Patriots, he caught two passes for 25 yards and a touchdown during the 35–11 road loss. During the regular-season finale against the Texans, Westbrook-Ihkine recorded four receptions for 78 yards and a touchdown in the 28–25 road victory.

Westbrook-Ikhine finished his second professional season with 38 receptions for 476 yards and four touchdowns in 16 games and seven starts.

==== 2022 season ====
On March 9, 2022, the Titans re-signed Westbrook-Ikhine to a one-year deal.

During a Week 5 21–17 road victory over the Washington Commanders, Westbrook-Ihkine had four receptions for 72 yards. During a Week 10 17–10 victory over the Broncos, he recorded five receptions for 119 yards and two touchdowns. During a Week 14 36–22 loss to the Jacksonville Jaguars, Westbrook-Ihkine caught three passes for 23 yards and a touchdown.

Westbrook-Ikhine finished the 2022 season with 25 receptions for 397 yards and three touchdowns in 17 games and 13 starts.

==== 2023 season ====
On March 16, 2023, Westbrook-Ikhine signed another one-year contract with the Titans.

During a Week 2 27–24 overtime victory over the Los Angeles Chargers, Westbrook-Ihkine caught three passes for 25 yards and his first touchdown of the season. Two weeks later against the Cincinnati Bengals, Westbrook-Ihkine recorded five receptions for 51 yards and a touchdown in the 27–3 victory. On December 20, 2023, he was placed on season-ending injured reserve with a hand injury.

Westbrook-Ikhine finished the 2023 season with 28 receptions for 370 yards and three touchdowns in 14 games and nine starts.

==== 2024 season ====
On March 15, 2024, Westbrook-Ikhine re-signed with the Titans.

Westbrook-Ikhine began the season as backup behind 2022 first round draft pick Treylon Burks on the depth chart, but he moved into the starting position in Week 6 after Burks sustained a season-ending injury in practice prior to Week 7. Starting in Week 6, Westbrook-Ikhine recorded touchdowns across four consecutive games, including one during a Week 9 20–17 overtime victory over the New England Patriots. During a Week 11 23–13 loss to the Minnesota Vikings, Westbrook-Ikhine had two receptions for 117 yards and a 98-yard touchdown, which was the league's longest reception of the season and a tie for the all-time franchise record. Two weeks later against the Commanders, Westbrook-Ikhine recorded three receptions for 61 yards and two touchdowns in the 42–14 road loss.

Westbrook-Ikhine finished the 2024 season with 32 receptions for a career-high 497 yards and a team-leading nine touchdowns in 17 games and nine starts. His nine touchdowns were the most by a Titan since A. J. Brown in 2020 and also tied ninth highest in the league for the 2024 season.

=== Miami Dolphins ===
On March 13, 2025, Westbrook-Ikhine signed a two-year, $6.5 million contract with the Miami Dolphins. He made 15 appearances for Miami (including three starts), and compiled 11 receptions for 89 yards.

On February 16, 2026, Westbrook-Ikhine was released by the Dolphins.

=== Indianapolis Colts ===
On March 18, 2026, Westbrook-Ikhine signed a one-year, $1.4 million contract with the Indianapolis Colts. Westbrook-Ikhine was released by Indianapolis as a part of final roster cuts on August 30; he was re-signed to the team's practice squad the following day. On November 10, Westbrook-Ikhine was signed to the active roster.

== Career statistics ==
=== NFL ===
Legend
	Led the league
**Bold**	Career-high

==== Regular season ====
Year	Team	Games		Receiving					Rushing					Fumbles	
Year	Team	GP	GS	Rec	Yds	Avg	Lng	TD	Att	Yds	Avg	Lng	TD	Fum	Lost
2020	TEN	14	1	3	33	11.0	19	0	0	0	0.0	0	0	0	0
2021	TEN	16	7	**38**	476	12.5	46	4	0	0	0.0	0	0	**1**	**1**
2022	TEN	**17**	**13**	25	397	**15.9**	63T	3	0	0	0.0	0	0	0	0
2023	TEN	14	9	28	370	13.2	33T	3	0	0	0.0	0	0	0	0
2024	TEN	**17**	9	32	**497**	15.5	**98T**	**9**	0	0	0.0	0	0	0	0
2025	MIA	15	3	11	89	8.1	18	0	0	0	0.0	0	0	0	0
2026	IND	3	0	0	0	0.0	0	0	0	0	0.0	0	0	0	0
Career		96	42	137	1,862	13.6	98T	19	0	0	0.0	0	0	1	1

==== Postseason ====
Year	Team	Games		Receiving					Rushing					Fumbles	
Year	Team	GP	GS	Rec	Yds	Avg	Lng	TD	Att	Yds	Avg	Lng	TD	Fum	Lost
2020	TEN	**1**	0	**2**	**17**	**8.5**	**12**	0	0	0	0.0	0	0	0	0
2021	TEN	**1**	0	0	0	0.0	0	0	0	0	0.0	0	0	0	0
Career		2	0	2	17	8.5	12	0	0	0	0.0	0	0	0	0

=== College ===
Year	Team	GP	Rec	Yds	Avg	TD
2015	Indiana	5	6	69	11.5	1
2016	Indiana	12	54	995	18.4	6
2018	Indiana	12	42	590	14.0	4
2019	Indiana	11	42	572	13.6	5
Career		**40**	**144**	**2,226**	**15.5**	**16**

== Personal life ==
Westbrook-Ikhine was primarily raised by his mother, Amy Westbrook Nickel. He went by the name Nick Westbrook through his college football career and made the decision to include Ikhine, his biological father's last name, on his jersey upon joining the NFL.

Westbrook-Ikhine married Hannah Linville in April 2023. They welcomed a son in May 2024.

He is of Nigerian descent.
