= Marcus Oliver =

American football player (born 1995)

Profile
- Position: Linebacker

Personal information
- Born: February 8, 1995 (age 31); Hamilton, Ohio, U.S.
- Listed height: 6 ft 1 in (1.85 m)
- Listed weight: 268 lb (122 kg)

Career information
- High school: Hamilton (OH)
- College: Indiana
- NFL draft: 2017: undrafted

Career history
- Philadelphia Eagles (2017)*; Atlanta Legends (2019)*
- * Offseason or practice squad member only
- Stats at Pro Football Reference

Javier Demarcus "Marcus" Oliver (born February 8, 1995) is an American former professional football linebacker. He played college football at Indiana.

== College career ==
Oliver was ranked 67th at his position and the 81st overall prospect in the state. After receiving six offers from Boston College, Cincinnati, Toledo, Miami (OH), Eastern Illinois and Indiana. Oliver signed with Indiana on December 6, 2012.

During his freshman season Oliver didn't see much playing time but still excelled. In three game played he recorded 11 total tackles and a pass deflection. In his final two years at Indiana Oliver was a main part and contributor in the Hoosiers defenses. Recording 183 tackles, 5 sacks, 5 forced fumbles, 2 inceptions, 7 pass deflections in his sophomore and junior years.

After Indiana's 2016 Foster Farms Bowl loss to the Utah Utes in which Oliver did not play. Oliver announced he would not be returning for his final year of eligibility at Indiana and entered the 2017 NFL draft.

== Professional career ==
After going undrafted in the 2017 NFL draft Oliver signed with the Philadelphia Eagles, but was waived after rookie minicamp.

Oliver was signed by the Atlanta Legends of the Alliance of American Football, but was waived before the start of the 2019 regular season.
