= Zander Diamont =

American football player (born 1995)

No. 12
- Position: Quarterback

Personal information
- Born: February 16, 1995 (age 31); Los Angeles, California, U.S.
- Listed height: 6 ft 1 in (1.85 m)
- Listed weight: 180 lb (82 kg)

Career information
- High school: Venice (Los Angeles)
- College: Indiana (2014−2016)
- Stats at ESPN

Alexander Diamont (born February 16, 1995) is an American former college football player who was a quarterback for the Indiana Hoosiers.

== Early life ==
Diamont attended and played football at Venice High School in Los Angeles.

== College career ==
=== 2014 season ===
After starting quarterback Nate Sudfeld suffered a season-ending shoulder injury in the game against Iowa, Diamont was named the new starter over fellow backup Chris Covington and started in the last six games of the season, passing for one touchdown and four interceptions. He rushed for an additional two touchdowns, including a game-winning score with 27 seconds remaining against rival Purdue. A photograph of Diamont celebrating the win over Purdue by smoking a cigar while holding the Old Oaken Bucket in the locker room went viral, earning Diamont comparisons to former Texas A&M quarterback Johnny Manziel and public congratulations from actor Adam Sandler, whose film Anger Management also included Diamont's father Don Diamont in a small acting role.

=== 2015 season ===
Diamont played in two games in 2015, again in relief of Sudfeld, who missed time with an ankle injury. He rushed for two touchdowns, including a 79-yard rushing touchdown against Ohio State, the longest rush by a quarterback in Hoosiers history. Sudfeld returned to the starting lineup in time for the Pinstripe Bowl against Duke.

=== 2016 season ===
Diamont passed for one touchdown and one interception in eight games, rushing for an additional four touchdowns.

At the conclusion of the 2016 regular season, Diamont announced that he would retire from football after Indiana's upcoming bowl game, citing concerns about brain injuries in football and admitting that he had sustained a high number of concussions in his career.

He would start in the Foster Farms Bowl against Utah, his last football game.

== Personal life ==
Diamont is Jewish. After graduating from Indiana University Bloomington, Diamont claimed that one of his football coaches, who knew of Diamont's Jewish ancestry, referred to Adolf Hitler as a "great leader" in a conversation about leadership that included Diamont. Diamont did not specify which coach made the remark; head coach Kevin Wilson was dismissed from the program after Diamont's final season amid allegations of mistreatment of players.

Diamont is the son of soap opera actor Don Diamont and the stepson of actress Cindy Ambuehl. His brother Luca played quarterback for the Duke Blue Devils.

Diamont returned to Los Angeles after graduating from Indiana and became a real estate agent selling luxury properties. In response to the COVID-19 pandemic and its effects on the real estate market, he moved to Scottsdale, Arizona, where he co-founded a real estate development company specializing in luxury tiny homes.
