= Simon Stepaniak =

American football player (born 1997)

No. 72
- Position: Offensive guard

Personal information
- Born: May 15, 1997 (age 29); Hamilton, Ohio, U.S.
- Listed height: 6 ft 4 in (1.93 m)
- Listed weight: 316 lb (143 kg)

Career information
- High school: Ross (Ross, Ohio)
- College: Indiana (2015–2019)
- NFL draft: 2020: 6th round, 209th overall pick

Career history
- Green Bay Packers (2020)

Awards and highlights
- Third-team All-Big Ten (2019)
- Stats at Pro Football Reference

Simon Vai Stepaniak (born May 15, 1997) is an American former professional football player who was an offensive guard in the National Football League (NFL). He played college football at Indiana.

== College career ==
A three-star recruit, Stepaniak committed to Indiana over offers from Louisville, Kentucky, Minnesota, Penn State, and Wake Forest, among others. In his first two seasons, he played behind Dan Feeney. As a senior, Stepaniak started 10 games at right guard and one game at left guard. He earned third-team all-Big Ten Conference honors. According to Pro Football Focus, he gave up one sack as a senior. Stepaniak made 31 career starts at Indiana.

== Professional career ==
Pre-draft measurables
Height	Weight	Arm length	Hand span	Bench press
6 ft 4 1/8 in (1.93 m)	313 lb (142 kg)	32 in (0.81 m)	10 3/8 in (0.26 m)	37 reps
All values from NFL Combine

Stepaniak was selected by the Green Bay Packers in the sixth round with the 209th pick of the 2020 NFL draft. He was the Packers' third straight offensive line selection. He was signed on June 1, 2020. He was placed on the active/non-football injury list at the start of training camp on July 31, 2020. He was moved to the reserve/non-football injury list at the start of the regular season on September 5, 2020. He was activated on December 9, 2020. On January 12, 2021, Stepaniak was placed on injured reserve. He was placed on the reserve/retired list on July 31, 2021, retiring that same day.
