= Kevin Wilson (American football) =

American football player and coach (born 1961)

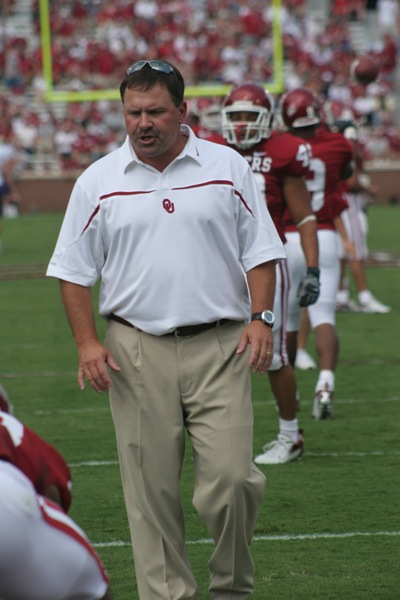
- Wilson in 2006

Current position
- Title: Offensive analyst
- Team: Oklahoma
- Conference: SEC

Biographical details
- Born: October 23, 1961 (age 65); Maiden, North Carolina, U.S.
- Education: North Carolina (1984)

Playing career
- 1980–1983: North Carolina
- Positions: Center, guard

Coaching career (HC unless noted)
- 1984–1986: North Carolina (GA)
- 1987: Winston-Salem State (OL)
- 1988: North Carolina A&T (OC/OL)
- 1989: Fred T. Foard HS (NC)
- 1990–1991: Miami (OH) (OL)
- 1992–1997: Miami (OH) (OC/OL)
- 1998: Miami (OH) (OC/QB)
- 1999–2000: Northwestern (OC/QB)
- 2001: Northwestern (AHC/OC/QB)
- 2002–2005: Oklahoma (co-OC/OL)
- 2006–2010: Oklahoma (OC/TE/FB)
- 2011–2016: Indiana
- 2017–2022: Ohio State (OC/TE)
- 2023–2024: Tulsa
- 2025–present: Oklahoma (OA)

Head coaching record
- Overall: 33–63 (college); 0–10 (high school)
- Bowls: 0–1

Accomplishments and honors

Awards
- Broyles Award (2008)

Kevin Reece Wilson (born October 23, 1961) is an American college football coach and former player. He was the head coach at the University of Tulsa from 2023 to 2024. He was the offensive coordinator at Ohio State University from 2017 to 2022. Wilson was head coach at Indiana University from 2011 to 2016, and offensive coordinator at the University of Oklahoma from 2002 to 2010. He is currently an analyst at the University of Oklahoma.

== Playing career ==
Wilson played offensive line and linebacker at Maiden High School in Maiden, North Carolina. He was all-conference for two seasons and for his senior season was named to the Charlotte Observer All-Piedmont team.

He went on to play center and guard for the University of North Carolina Tar Heels football team as a walk-on. After two seasons as a walk-on he earned a scholarship. He earned a degree in Education in 1984, and then became a graduate assistant for three years while working on a master's degree in Physical Education.

While at North Carolina Randy Walker was a Tar Heels assistant. When Walker left Northwestern to become head coach at Miami University in 1990, Wilson became his assistant there.

== Coaching career ==
=== North Carolina ===
After playing for the North Carolina Tar Heels, he spent three seasons (1984–1986) as a graduate assistant coach while he worked on his master's degree. In 1987, he became the offensive line coach at Winston-Salem State University. Wilson was the offensive coordinator for the 1988 season for the North Carolina A&T Aggies.

=== Fred T. Foard High School ===
In 1989, he became the head coach and athletic director of Fred T. Foard High School in Newton, North Carolina, near his hometown of Maiden, where the Tigers went 0–10.

=== Miami ===
Following one year coaching on the high school level, Wilson returned to college coaching for the Miami University RedHawks in 1990, under head coach Randy Walker, and coached there as offensive line coach, quarterbacks coach and offensive coordinator until 1998.

=== Northwestern ===
When Walker moved to Northwestern University Wilson went with him, serving as the offensive coordinator, quarterbacks coach, and assistant head coach, from 1999 to 2001. Wilson's power-spread offense led the Wildcats to a Big Ten Conference co-championship in 2000 and led conference in rushing for the first time in 54 years.

=== Oklahoma ===
After spending 19 seasons under the tutelage of his mentor Walker (four as a player at North Carolina, three as a graduate assistant there, nine as a coach at Miami, and three as a coach at Northwestern), Wilson left his long-time mentor to become the running game coordinator and the offensive line coach at Oklahoma in 2002. Wilson caught Stoops' attention after Wilson adopted "Leach-style" passing offense that was then morphed into the spread run game. In December 2005, Wilson was named the offensive coordinator for the Sooners prior to the 2006 season, replacing Chuck Long who left to become the head coach at San Diego State. Oklahoma named James Patton to replace Wilson as offensive line coach, Patton served under Wilson at both Northwestern and Miami, and Wilson recommended Patton to Sooners' head coach Bob Stoops. In 2008, Wilson won the Broyles Award, which is given to the top assistant in college football annually. He was also named the "FootballScoop Offensive Coordinator of the Year".

=== Indiana ===
Indiana athletic director Fred Glass announced the dismissal of Bill Lynch and the rest of the coaching staff on November 28, 2010, following a third straight season with only one conference victory. Glass announced the hiring of Wilson on December 7, giving Wilson his first collegiate head coaching position. Just thirteen days later Wilson hired New Mexico defensive coordinator Doug Mallory and Nebraska linebackers coach Mike Ekeler (also LBs) as co-defensive coordinators. Mallory, the son of former Indiana head coach Bill Mallory, was Indiana's defensive backs coach from 1994 to 1996. Wilson also hired Rod Smith from Michigan and Kevin Johns from Northwestern to be co-offensive coordinators. Wilson took over a Hoosiers team that had finished 10th or 11th in the Big Ten in each of the previous three seasons and had not been to a bowl since losing to Oklahoma State in the 2007 Insight Bowl.

Under Wilson's first year, the Hoosiers had a 1–11 record. In his second year, Indiana improved to 4-8 on the year with Wilson's team exhibiting an explosive offense, going from 80th nationally in pass offense to 19th and leading the Big Ten with 311.2 yards per game, in spite of losing the starting quarterback Tre Roberson in the season's second game.

In 2015, Indiana finished the regular season with a 6-6 record and showed a much more competitive level of play in the Big Ten. Indiana received an invitation to play in the Pinstripe Bowl, their first bowl game since 2007. After the season ended, Wilson signed a 6-year, $15.3 million contract extension that ran through 2021. Wilson resigned from Indiana on December 1, 2016, after multiple internal investigations into mistreatment of players.

=== Ohio State ===
Ohio State announced January 10, 2017 that Wilson had been hired as the offensive coordinator and tight ends coach under head coach Urban Meyer. In the 2017 season, Wilson assisted the Buckeyes to a 12-2 season which included a Big Ten Championship victory over Wisconsin and a win over the University of Southern California in the Cotton Bowl Classic.

In the 2018 season, Wilson worked as Co-Offensive Coordinator with Ryan Day. Wilson would be a part of 13-1 season with another Big Ten Championship Win, this time over Northwestern, and a Rose Bowl victory against Washington.

Wilson worked as Co-Offensive Coordinator with Mike Yurcich under their new head coach, Ryan Day. The Buckeyes finished the season 13-1, with another Big Ten Championship victory over Wisconsin and a trip to the College Football Playoffs.

=== Tulsa ===
The University of Tulsa announced on December 5, 2022, that Wilson would be the next head football coach for the Golden Hurricane, but would remain with Ohio State through the end of their College Football Playoff run. Tulsa fired Wilson with one game remaining in the 2024 season. Wilson's record at Tulsa was 7–16, with no postseason appearances. Ryan Switzer succeeded him as interim head coach.

== Wilson's offensive statistics ==
University of Oklahoma Wilson's 2008 up-tempo and no-huddle Oklahoma offense resulted in the Sooners scoring at least 60 points in every one of their last 5 conference games and a 65-21 victory over undefeated Texas Tech. The Sooners' quarterback, Sam Bradford, finished the 2008 season with 4720 passing yards and 50 passing touchdowns. It was after the 2008 season that Wilson received the Broyles Award as the top assistant coach of the year. Wilson's offenses featured a then-NCAA record 716 points during the 2008 season which now ranks as No. 3 in FBS history. During Wilson's tenure at Oklahoma, the Sooners won six Big 12 Championships and played in 3 National Championships.

Indiana University In Wilson's last five seasons as head coach for the Indiana Hoosiers, his offense led the Big Ten Conference in passing yards per game (226.7 yards), was second in total yards per game (459.3 yards), third in points per game (31.4 points), and fourth in rushing yards per game (192.7 yards).

Ohio State University Since Wilson joined the Ohio State Buckeyes in 2017, they have averaged 523.8 yards per game (third in the nation), had more than 500 yards of total offense 27 times and over 600 yards nine times, scored 234 touchdowns (second in the nation), completed 138 touchdown passes (best in the nation), set six Big Ten Conference Offensive Records in the 2018 season (535.6 yards per game, 5,100 passing yards, 51 touchdown passes, 1131 total plays). Wilson's offense produced back-to-back Heisman Trophy finalists (Dwayne Haskins and Justin Fields), the first 2,000-yard rusher in school history (J. K. Dobbins), and the fifth 1,000-yard receiver in school history (Parris Campbell).

== Head coaching record ==
Year	Team	Overall	Conference	Standing	Bowl/playoffs
Indiana Hoosiers (Big Ten Conference) (2011–2016)
2011	Indiana	1–11	0–8	6th (Leaders)	
2012	Indiana	4–8	2–6	5th (Leaders)	
2013	Indiana	5–7	3–5	4th (Leaders)	
2014	Indiana	4–8	1–7	7th (East)	
2015	Indiana	6–7	2–6	5th (East)	L Pinstripe
2016	Indiana	6–6	4–5	4th (East)	Foster Farms (Note: Did not coach bowl game)
Indiana:		26–47	12–37		
Tulsa Golden Hurricane (American Athletic Conference) (2023–2024)
2023	Tulsa	4–8	2–6	T–11th	
2024	Tulsa	3–8	1–6	(Note: Tulsa fired Wilson with one game remaining)	
Tulsa:		7–16	3–12		
Total:		33–63			
