= Devine Redding =

American football player (born 1996)

No. 34, 40
- Position: Running back

Personal information
- Born: February 5, 1996 (age 30); Youngstown, Ohio, U.S.
- Listed height: 5 ft 8 in (1.73 m)
- Listed weight: 205 lb (93 kg)

Career information
- High school: Glenville (Cleveland, Ohio)
- College: Indiana
- NFL draft: 2017: undrafted

Career history
- Kansas City Chiefs (2017)*; Tampa Bay Buccaneers (2018)*; YCF Power (2018)
- * Offseason or practice squad member only
- Stats at Pro Football Reference

Devine Redding (born February 5, 1996) is an American former football running back. He played college football at Indiana.

== Early life ==
Redding played his Freshman year for Austintown Fitch High School. At the beginning of his Sophomore year, he transferred to Mineral Ridge High School to play the next two years as a standout running back and outside linebacker. He transferred again to Glenville High School for his senior year where his team reached the OHSAA DIV II State Championship. He received honorable mention all-state his senior year and was rated the 58th running back nationally, in 2013, according to 247Sports.com.

=== Recruiting ===
Redding received offers from West Virginia and Indiana, while also considering Cincinnati, Akron and Ohio State. Redding committed to Indiana in October 2013.

College recruiting
| Name | Hometown | School | Height | Weight | 40^{‡} | Commit date |
|---|---|---|---|---|---|---|
| Devine Redding; RB | Youngstown, Ohio | Glenville High School | 5 ft 10 in (1.78 m) | 187 lb (85 kg) | 4.75 | Oct 20, 2013 |
| Devine Redding; RB | Recruit ratings: Scout: Rivals: (74) | | | | | |
Overall recruit ranking:
‡ Refers to 40-yard dash; Note: In many cases, Scout, Rivals, 247Sports, On3, and ESPN may conflict in their listings of height, weight and 40 time.; In these cases, the average was taken. ESPN grades are on a 100-point scale.; Sources: "2014 Team Ranking". Rivals.com.

== College career ==
=== Freshman year ===
In 2014, Redding played in 10 games, rushing for 118 yards with 1 touchdown. His sole touchdown would come in the 5th week of the season against North Texas on October 4.

=== Sophomore year ===
Following the departure of Tevin Coleman to the 2015 NFL draft, Redding was utilized as one of Indiana's main running backs for the 2015 season; Redding would split time during the season with future NFL running back Jordan Howard. Redding started four games, appeared in all 12 regular season games and participated in Indiana's bid to the Pinstripe Bowl. Redding would finish the season with 1,012 yards rushing, including a Pinstripe Bowl record-setting performance with 227 yards and 1 touchdown and IU Offensive Player of the Week (against Duke). His rushing numbers for 2015 put him 17th overall in program history for yards ran in a single season.

=== Junior year ===
Prior to the start of the 2016 season, Redding was added to the list of candidates for the Doak Walker Award. Redding finished the year with 1,122 total yards rushing and 7 touchdowns. This was the second year in a row that Redding finished the season with more than 1,000 yards rushing. Redding received 2016 All-Big Ten honorable mention honors. On January 6, 2017, Redding announced that he would forego his senior season and declare for the 2017 NFL draft.

=== Statistics ===
Collegiate career statistics
| Season | Rushing | | | | | Receiving | | | | |
| Season | Att | Yards | Avg | Long | TD | Rec | Yards | Avg | Long | TD |
| 2014 | 29 | 118 | 4.1 | 16 | 1 | 1 | 14 | 14.0 | 14 | 0 |
| 2015 | 226 | 1,012 | 4.5 | 66 | 9 | 12 | 85 | 7.1 | 21 | 0 |
| 2016 | 253 | 1,122 | 4.4 | 36 | 7 | 27 | 146 | 5.4 | 19 | 2 |
| NCAA Total | 508 | 2,252 | 4.4 | 66 | 17 | 40 | 245 | 6.1 | 21 | 2 |

== Professional career ==
=== Kansas City Chiefs ===
Redding was signed by the Kansas City Chiefs as an undrafted free agent on May 9, 2017. He was waived on September 2, 2017 and was signed to the Chiefs' practice squad the next day. He was released on September 6, 2017.

=== Tampa Bay Buccaneers ===
On August 26, 2018, Redding was signed by the Tampa Bay Buccaneers. He was waived on September 1, 2018.
