= Jordan Howard =

American football player (born 1994)

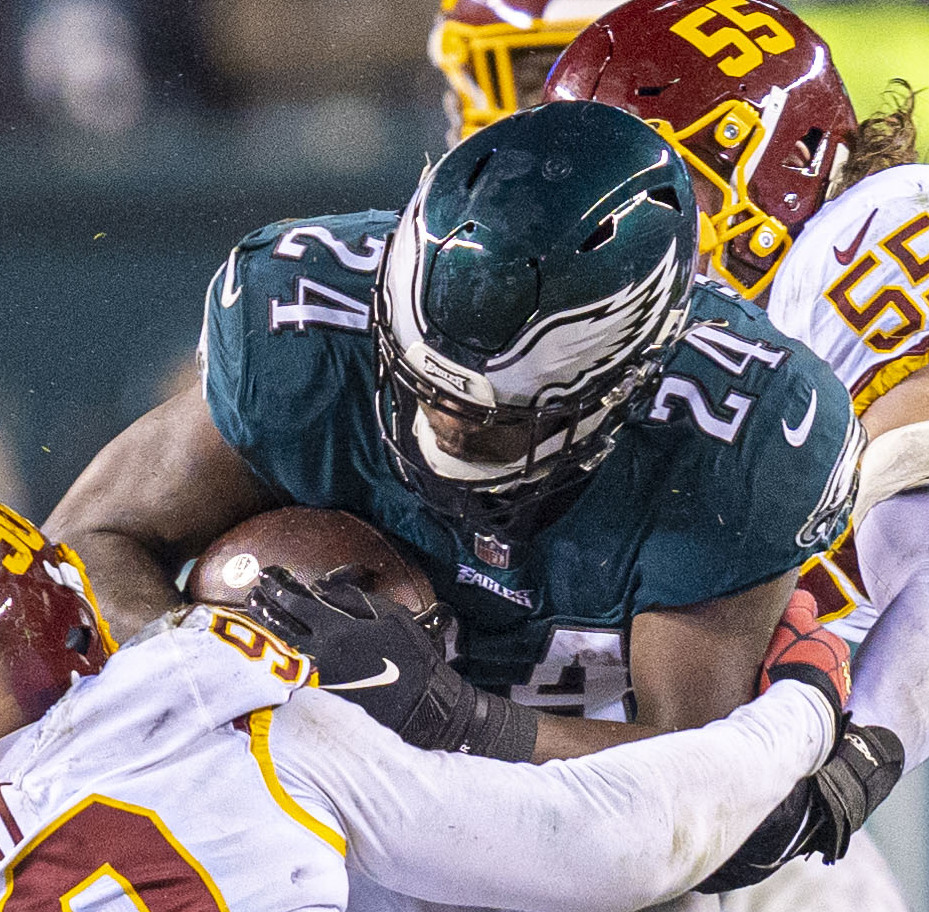
- Howard with the Philadelphia Eagles in 2021

No. 24, 34, 28
- Position: Running back

Personal information
- Born: November 2, 1994 (age 32); Fairfield, Alabama, U.S.
- Listed height: 6 ft 0 in (1.83 m)
- Listed weight: 224 lb (102 kg)

Career information
- High school: Gardendale (Gardendale, Alabama)
- College: UAB (2013–2014); Indiana (2015)
- NFL draft: 2016: 5th round, 150th overall pick

Career history
- Chicago Bears (2016–2018); Philadelphia Eagles (2019); Miami Dolphins (2020); Philadelphia Eagles (2020–2021); New Orleans Saints (2022)

Awards and highlights
- Pro Bowl (2016); PFWA All-Rookie Team (2016); First-team All-Big Ten (2015); First-team All-Conference USA (2014)

Career NFL statistics
- Rushing yards: 4,362
- Rushing average: 4.3
- Rushing touchdowns: 37
- Receptions: 85
- Receiving yards: 653
- Receiving touchdowns: 2
- Stats at Pro Football Reference

Jordan Reginald Howard (born November 2, 1994) is an American former professional football player who was a running back in the National Football League (NFL). He played college football for the UAB Blazers and Indiana Hoosiers.

== Early life ==
Howard played high school football at Gardendale High School in Gardendale, Alabama, a suburb of Birmingham. He was a two-year starter for the Rockets, gaining 2,876 yards in his junior and senior seasons. While he excelled for the Rockets, he was generally regarded as a just two-star prospect and was not a highly sought-after recruit by major college programs. He ended up going to play college football just a few miles away from his home at the University of Alabama at Birmingham in Birmingham, Alabama.

== College career ==
=== UAB ===
Howard began his college football career at UAB in 2013. He made his collegiate debut against LSU. He rushed for a season-high 159 yards against FIU. He finished the 2013 season with 881 rushing yards. His longest rushing play of the season was 52 yards against Vanderbilt. Howard finished second in yards per carry (6.1) in Conference USA.

As a sophomore in 2014, he set a school single-season record with 1,587 rushing yards and ranked seventh among Division I FBS players with an average of 132.3 rushing yards per game. Howard was second in rushing yards in Conference USA for the 2014 season.

=== Indiana ===
Following the shutdown of UAB's football team, Howard transferred to Indiana University Bloomington prior to the 2015 season. He rushed for a season-high 238 yards and two touchdowns against Michigan on November 14, 2015. In only nine games in his junior season, Howard rushed for 1,213 yards and nine touchdowns on 196 attempts and had 11 receptions for 106 yards and one touchdown.

Howard received his Bachelor of Science degree from Indiana University Bloomington on May 4, 2019.

== Professional career ==
=== Pre-draft ===
On December 27, 2015, Howard declared for the 2016 NFL draft, foregoing his senior season. Howard was graded a 6.1 on NFL.com and had the third-highest running back rating with only Derrick Henry at 6.15, and Ezekiel Elliott at 7.09 having higher ratings than him. He was one of 24 running backs invited to the NFL Scouting Combine in Indianapolis, Indiana. Howard attended the combine, but opted to only perform the bench press, vertical jump, and broad jump. On May 1, 2016, he participated at Indiana's pro day, along with Nate Sudfeld, Jason Spriggs, Darius Latham, and seven other then prospects. Howard performed all of the running drills that he opted out of at the combine and also performed positional drills. At the conclusion of the pre-draft process, Howard was projected to be a second or third round pick by NFL draft experts and scouts. Howard was ranked as the third best running back in the draft by NFLDraftScout.com, the fourth best running back by Sports Illustrated, and was ranked the sixth best running back in the draft by NFL analyst Mike Mayock.

Pre-draft measurables
Height	Weight	Arm length	Hand span	40-yard dash	10-yard split	20-yard split	20-yard shuttle	Three-cone drill	Vertical jump	Broad jump	Bench press
5 ft 11 7/8 in (1.83 m)	230 lb (104 kg)	32 1/4 in (0.82 m)	9 in (0.23 m)	4.59 s	1.66 s	2.68 s	4.34 s	7.14 s	34 in (0.86 m)	10 ft 2 in (3.10 m)	16 reps
All values from NFL Combine/Indiana's Pro Day

=== Chicago Bears ===
==== 2016 season ====
The Chicago Bears selected Howard in the fifth round (150th overall) of the 2016 NFL Draft. He was the tenth running back taken in the draft. On May 9, 2016, the Bears signed him to a four-year, $2.58 million contract with a signing bonus of $248,022.

Following the departure of veteran running back, Matt Forte, Howard competed with Jeremy Langford, Jacquizz Rodgers, and Ka'Deem Carey for the Bears' starting running back position. Howard had a strong performance in the Bears' preseason finale against the Cleveland Browns, where he rushed for 107 yards with one touchdown. The Bears named Howard as their third running back on their depth chart behind veterans Langford and Carey prior to the start of the regular season.

Howard made his professional regular season debut in the Bears' second game of the season against the Philadelphia Eagles after Carey suffered a hamstring injury. He finished the game with three carries for 22 rushing yards and two receptions for nine yards. Howard was named the Bears' starting running back after Langford suffered an ankle injury. On October 2, 2016, Howard earned his first career start against the Detroit Lions and finished the game with 23 carries for 111 rushing yards and three catches for 29 yards as the Bears won 17–14. The next game, Howard rushed the ball 16 times for 118 rushing yards and caught three passes for 45 yards and a touchdown in a loss to the Indianapolis Colts. His first career touchdown reception came on a 21-yard pass from Brian Hoyer.

On October 16, Howard had 15 rushing attempts for 45 rushing yards and scored his first career rushing touchdown on a one-yard run during 17–16 loss to the Jacksonville Jaguars. In Week 8, Howard had 26 carries for a season-high 153 rushing yards and a touchdown in a 20–10 win over the Minnesota Vikings. He was named the 'NFC's Offensive Player of the Week' for his third game with more than 100 rushing yards against the Vikings. On December 4, in Week 13, Howard ran for 117 yards on 32 carries and scored a season-high, and franchise rookie record-tying three rushing touchdowns in a 26–6 win over the San Francisco 49ers.

Howard eclipsed 1,000 rushing yards, the fifth rookie in team history to reach 1,000 rushing yards (Matt Forte in 2008, Anthony Thomas in 2001, Rashaan Salaam in 1995, and Beattie Feathers in 1934). On December 24, he had his sixth game of the season with over 100 rushing yards: 18 carries for 119 yards in a 41–21 Week 16 loss to the Washington Redskins. In the New Year's Day season finale, Howard had a Bears rookie record seventh 100-yard game, with 23 carries for 135 yards in a loss to the Vikings. Howard finished the season with a Bears rookie record 1,313 rushing yards, second in the league behind fellow rookie Ezekiel Elliott. His 5.2 yards per carry ranked fifth among NFL running backs in 2016. Howard was later named to the 2017 Pro Bowl as a replacement for injured Arizona Cardinals running back David Johnson. Howard joined Gale Sayers as the only Bears rookie running backs to make the Pro Bowl. He was named to the NFL All-Rookie Team.

==== 2017 season ====
Howard shared the Bears' backfield with Tarik Cohen in the 2017 season. After disappointing outings of 52 yards against the Atlanta Falcons and seven yards against the Tampa Bay Buccaneers to start the 2017 season, Howard recorded 140 yards and two touchdowns against the Pittsburgh Steelers in Week 3, including the game-winner in overtime. After gaining 53 yards against the Green Bay Packers and 76 yards against the Minnesota Vikings in Bears losses, he was asked to carry the ball an NFL-season-high 36 times in Week 6 to support rookie quarterback Mitch Trubisky in his second game, which he converted into a career-high 167 yards in the victory over the Baltimore Ravens. It was the most rushing yards by a Chicago Bear since Matt Forte's 205 in Week 4 of 2011. After recording 65 rushing yards in a 17–3 win over the Carolina Panthers, Howard added 102 yards in Week 8 against the New Orleans Saints, and 125 yards in Week 11 against the Lions, joining Le'Veon Bell as the only player with three 125+ yard rushing games on the season. After small outings of only six rushing yards against the Philadelphia Eagles and 38 rushing yards against the San Francisco 49ers, he had 147 rushing yards and two touchdowns in the 33–7 victory over the Cincinnati Bengals in Week 14. He finished out the 2017 season with 90 rushing yards combined over the last three games. Overall, in the 2017 season, he finished with 1,122 rushing yards and nine rushing touchdowns to go along with 23 receptions for 125 receiving yards.

==== 2018 season ====
Howard in 2018

Going into the 2018 season, Howard and Cohen remained as the main duo in the Bears' backfield.

On September 9, 2018, Howard racked up 82 rushing yards and 25 receiving yards in the season-opening 24–23 loss to the Green Bay Packers. Two weeks later, he scored for the first time of the season in the 16–14 victory over the Arizona Cardinals. On October 28, Howard rushed 22 times for an 81 yards and a touchdown in the 24–10 victory against the New York Jets. The next week, Howard ran in two touchdowns against the Buffalo Bills.

As the 2018 season approached its final stages, Howard's involvement began to increase. In Week 14 against the Los Angeles Rams, Howard rushed for a season-high 101 yards as the Bears won 15-6. In Week 17 against the Vikings, Howard rushed for 101 yards and two touchdowns in a 24–10 win. Howard finished the season with 935 rushing yards and 9 touchdowns. In addition, he had 20 receptions for 145 receiving yards. The Bears won the NFC North and earned the #3-seed for the NFC Playoffs. In the Wild Card Round against the Eagles, he had 10 carries for 35 yards in his playoff debut, a 16–15 loss.

Howard ended the season with 935 rushing yards on 250 attempts, while his nine touchdowns led the team. He received an overall grade of 70.2 from Pro Football Focus in 2018, which ranked as the 37th highest grade among all qualifying running backs.

=== Philadelphia Eagles (first stint) ===
On March 28, 2019, Howard was traded to the Eagles for a 2020 sixth round pick. Howard made his debut with the Eagles in Week 1 against the Redskins. In the game, Howard rushed six times for 44 yards and caught two passes for 11 yards as the Eagles won 32-27. In Week 4 against the Packers, Howard rushed 15 times for 87 yards and two rushing touchdowns and caught three passes for 28 yards and one receiving touchdown in the 34-27 win. In Week 8 against the Bills, Howard rushed a season high 23 times for 96 yards and a touchdown in the 31-13 win. In Week 9 against his former team, the Bears, Howard rushed 19 times for 82 yards and a touchdown in the 22–14 win. Howard suffered a shoulder injury and did not appear in any games toward the end of the season. In the 2019 season, Howard appeared in ten games and recorded 525 rushing yards and six rushing touchdowns.

=== Miami Dolphins ===
On March 21, 2020, Howard signed a two-year, $9.75 million contract with the Miami Dolphins. He made his debut with the Dolphins in Week 1 against the New England Patriots. During the game, Howard managed to rush eight times for seven yards, but scored the Dolphins' lone touchdown of the 21–11 loss. He was waived on November 16, 2020. For the Dolphins, Howard played in five games and had four touchdowns.

=== Philadelphia Eagles (second stint) ===
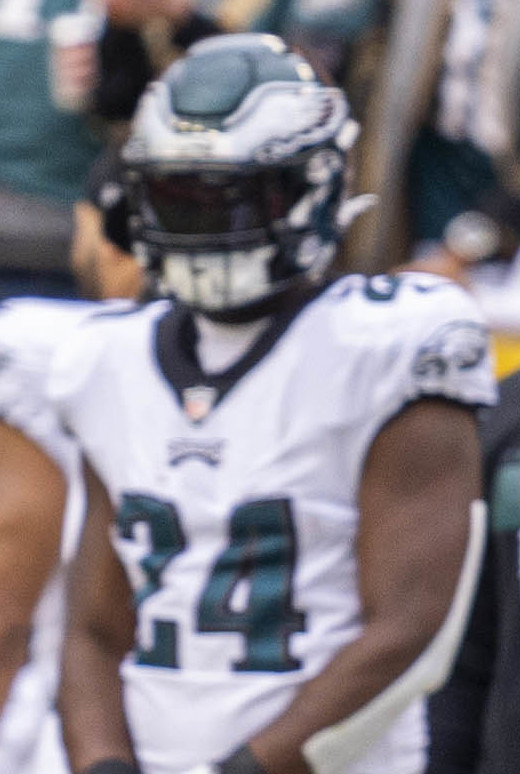
Howard in 2022

On November 23, 2020, Howard was signed to the Eagles' practice squad. He was elevated to the active roster on December 5 and 26 for the team's Weeks 13 and 16 games against the Green Bay Packers and Dallas Cowboys, and reverted to the practice squad after each game. His practice squad contract with the team expired after the season on January 11, 2021.

Howard re-signed to a one-year contract on April 13, 2021. He was released on August 31, 2021, and re-signed to the practice squad the next day. Howard was called up to the active roster following an injury to starter Miles Sanders and soon established himself as the Eagles' lead back. He rushed for 57 yards and 2 touchdowns on 12 carries in a 44-6 win against the Detroit Lions, followed by 71 yards and a touchdown on 17 carries against the Los Angeles Chargers. The Eagles signed Howard to the active roster on November 10, 2021. In Week 11 against the Saints, Howard rushed for 63 yards on 10 carries before he suffered a neck injury that sidelined him for two weeks. He suffered a stinger against the New York Giants in Week 16, but managed to play Week 17 against the Washington Football Team. He was placed on the COVID list on January 3, 2022. He was activated one week later on January 10, missing just one game where the Eagles did not play their starters. He finished the 2021 season with 86 carries for 406 rushing yards and three rushing touchdowns.

=== New Orleans Saints ===
On October 12, 2022, Howard was signed to the Saints practice squad. He was released on November 15.

On November 30, 2022, the Washington Commanders hosted Howard for a workout.

== Career statistics ==
=== NFL ===
Year	Team	Games		Rushing					Receiving					Fumbles	
Year	Team	GP	GS	Att	Yds	Avg	Lng	TD	Rec	Yds	Avg	Lng	TD	Fum	Lost
2016	CHI	15	13	252	1,313	5.2	69	6	29	298	10.3	34	1	2	1
2017	CHI	16	16	276	1,122	4.1	53	9	23	125	5.4	12	0	1	1
2018	CHI	16	15	250	935	3.7	42	9	20	145	7.3	18	0	2	1
2019	PHI	10	4	119	525	4.4	20	6	10	69	6.9	20	1	0	0
2020	MIA	5	3	28	33	1.2	8	4	1	-3	-3.0	-3	0	1	0
2020	PHI	2	1	7	27	3.9	11	0	—	—	—	—	—	0	0
2021	PHI	7	0	86	406	4.7	25	3	2	19	9.5	10	0	0	0
2022	NO	2	0	1	1	1.0	1	0	—	—	—	—	—	0	0
Career		73	52	1,019	4,362	4.3	69	37	85	653	7.7	34	2	6	3

=== College ===
Season	Team	GP	Rushing					Receiving			
Season	Team	GP	Att	Yds	Avg	Lng	TD	Rec	Yds	Avg	TD
2013	UAB	11	145	881	6.1	52	2	4	83	20.8	1
2014	UAB	12	306	1,587	5.2	55	13	9	72	8.0	1
2015	Indiana	9	196	1,213	6.2	37	9	11	106	9.6	1
Career		32	647	3,681	5.7	55	24	24	261	10.9	3

== Personal life ==
Howard is the son of Flora Hollis-Williams and Dr. Reginald Bernard "Doc" Howard, a dentist. His father died at the age of 52 on January 31, 2007, of pulmonary fibrosis. Since that date, he has worn a white T-shirt with his father's photo printed on it under his pads for upwards of 80 football games. He is a supporter of the Pulmonary Fibrosis Foundation.
