= Dan Feeney =

American football player (born 1994)

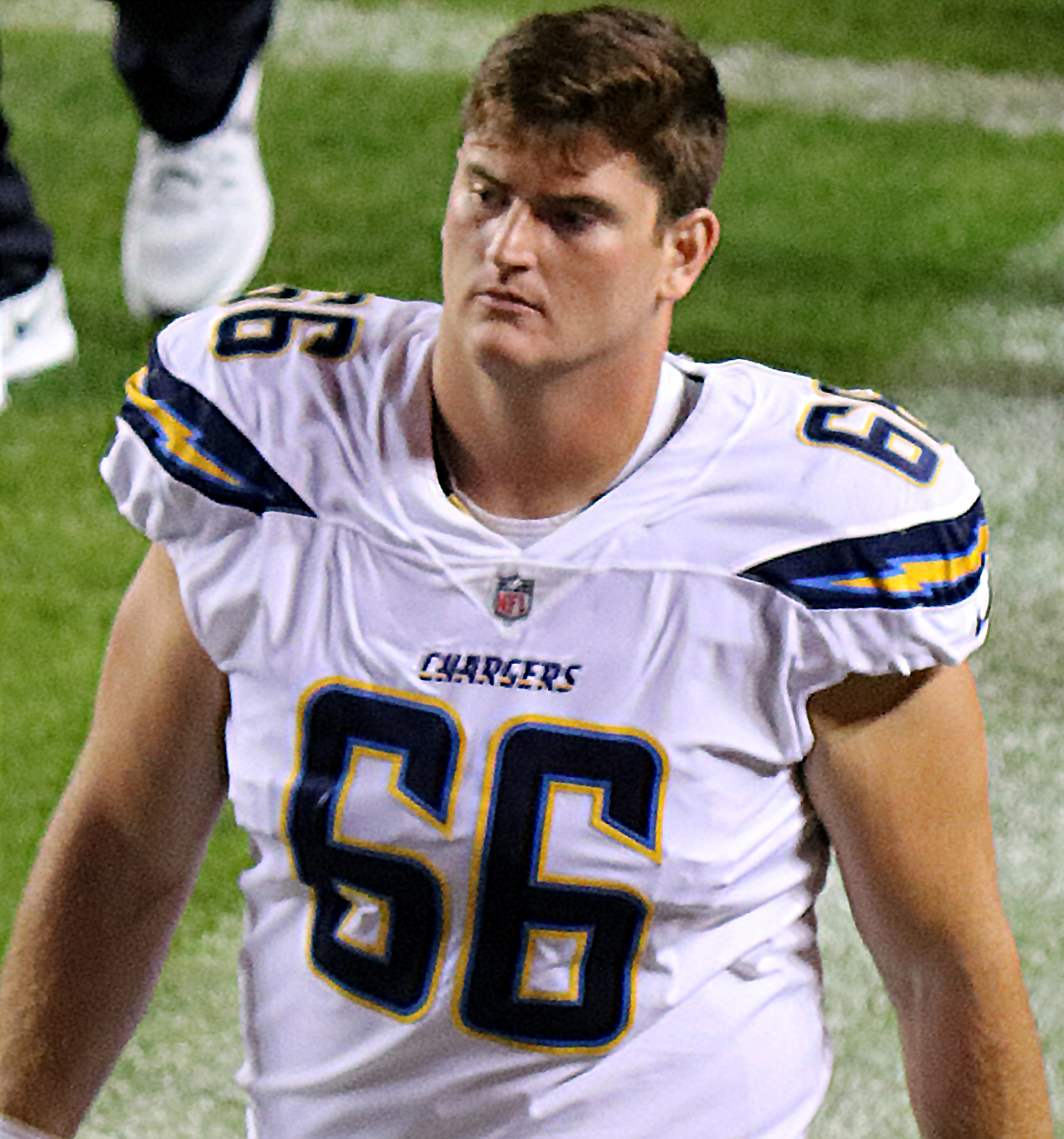
- Feeney with the Los Angeles Chargers in 2017

No. 65 – Tampa Bay Buccaneers
- Position: Guard
- Roster status: Active

Personal information
- Born: May 29, 1994 (age 32); Orland Park, Illinois, U.S.
- Listed height: 6 ft 4 in (1.93 m)
- Listed weight: 310 lb (141 kg)

Career information
- High school: Carl Sandburg (Orland Park)
- College: Indiana (2012–2016)
- NFL draft: 2017: 3rd round, 71st overall pick

Career history
- Los Angeles Chargers (2017–2020); New York Jets (2021–2022); Miami Dolphins (2023)*; Chicago Bears (2023); Minnesota Vikings (2024); Buffalo Bills (2025)*; Tampa Bay Buccaneers (2025–present)
- * Offseason or practice squad member only

Awards and highlights
- PFWA NFL All-Rookie Team (2017); 2× First-team All-American (2015, 2016); 2× First-team All-Big Ten (2015, 2016)

Career NFL statistics as of 2025
- Games played: 132
- Games started: 75
- Stats at Pro Football Reference

Daniel James Feeney (born May 29, 1994) is an American professional football guard for the Tampa Bay Buccaneers of the National Football League (NFL). He played college football for the Indiana Hoosiers and was selected by the Los Angeles Chargers in the third round of the 2017 NFL draft.

== Early life ==
Feeney was a one-year letterman in volleyball and four year letterman for the Carl Sandburg High School Eagles football team, where he was named team MVP in his junior year, playing on both the offensive and defensive lines.

Feeney received offers from Illinois and Western Michigan, but committed to Indiana in the summer of 2011.

College recruiting
Name	Hometown	School	Height	Weight	Commit date
Dan Feeney; OG	Orland Park, Illinois	Carl Sandburg High School	6 ft 4 in (1.93 m)	280 lb (130 kg)	Jun 19, 2011
Dan Feeney; OG	Recruit ratings: Scout: Rivals: (77)				
Overall recruit ranking: Scout: 83 (OG), 3 (IL OG) Rivals: 20 (IL) ESPN: 60 (OG), 16 (IL)
Note: In many cases, Scout, Rivals, 247Sports, On3, and ESPN may conflict in their listings of height and weight.; In these cases, the average was taken. ESPN grades are on a 100-point scale.; Sources: "2012 Team Ranking". Rivals.com.

== College career ==
Feeney set records in his freshman year in 2012, by starting all 12 games and earned honorable mention All-Big Ten honors at right guard, and did not allow a single sack all season. He suffered a Lisfranc fracture during a scrimmage that would cause him to miss the entire 2013 season. Feeney was redshirted to maintain three years of eligibility.

Feeney returned in 2014 to what ESPN termed "the B1G's most underrated position group". He started all 12 games in a year where Indiana set program single-season records with 3,163 rushing yards, led by 2,036 yards from Heisman candidate Tevin Coleman.

Ahead of his redshirt junior season in 2015, Feeney was named to the Lombardi Award and Outland Trophy watch lists. At the end of the season, Feeney earned consensus first-team All-American honors from ESPN, CBS Sports, the Associated Press and Sports Illustrated.

Prior to the start of the 2016 season, Feeney announced he would be returning for his senior year. On September 10, 2016, Feeney suffered a concussion while playing against Ball State. Feeney would be medically cleared to return to action prior to the Hoosiers game against Maryland on October 29, 2016. On November 30, 2016, Feeney was named First-team All-Big Ten. At the end of the season, Feeney earned his second All-American Team honors by the Associated Press.

== Professional career ==
=== Pre-draft ===
In June 2016, Feeney was labelled the “best interior offensive lineman” prospect in the 2017 NFL draft by NFL analyst Lance Zierlein. After completing his senior season in 2016, Feeney entered the draft and was projected by NFL draft experts and scouts to be a second-round pick. He received an invitation to the NFL Combine and completed all of the required combine and positional drills. On March 31, 2017, he participated at Indiana's pro day, along with Devine Redding and six other prospects. He opted to only perform positional drills for scouts and team representatives from 27 NFL teams looked on, including offensive line coaches from the Philadelphia Eagles, Buffalo Bills, Miami Dolphins, and Detroit Lions. He was ranked the second best offensive guard prospect in the draft by NFLDraftScout.com, ESPN, and NFL analyst Mike Mayock.

Pre-draft measurables
Height	Weight	Arm length	Hand span	Wingspan	40-yard dash	10-yard split	20-yard split	20-yard shuttle	Three-cone drill	Vertical jump	Broad jump	Bench press
6 ft 3 7/8 in (1.93 m)	305 lb (138 kg)	33 3/8 in (0.85 m)	10 1/4 in (0.26 m)	6 ft 9 in (2.06 m)	5.24 s	1.82 s	3.00 s	4.68 s	7.52 s	28 in (0.71 m)	8 ft 5 in (2.57 m)	26 reps
All values are from NFL Combine

=== Los Angeles Chargers ===
The Los Angeles Chargers selected Feeney in the third round (71st overall) of the 2017 NFL Draft. Feeney was the second guard the Chargers selected in the draft, behind Forrest Lamp (second round, 38th overall). He was also the fourth offensive guard and the fifth interior offensive lineman selected in the draft.

On June 2, 2017, the Los Angeles Chargers signed Feeney to a four-year contract worth $3.7 million, with a $924,632 signing bonus.

He competed with Lamp, Matt Slauson, Brett Boyko, Donavon Clark, and Kenny Wiggins throughout training camp for a starting guard position. Head coach Anthony Lynn named Feeney as the back-up right guard to Wiggins, after Lamp tore his ACL and was placed on injured reserve for the season.

He made his professional regular season debut during the Chargers' season-opening game, which was a 21–24 loss to the Denver Broncos. On October 29, Feeney earned his first career start at left guard during a 13–21 loss to the New England Patriots after the starter, Slauson, suffered a season-ending biceps injury. Dan ended up starting the rest of the season at left guard, being named to the PFWA All-Rookie Team for his efforts.

Feeney entered 2018 continuing as the starting left guard, and did so for all 16 regular season games.

In the 2019 season, he made his first NFL career fumble recovery in a Week 4 win against the Miami Dolphins.

=== New York Jets ===
On March 19, 2021, Feeney signed a one-year contract with the New York Jets. That season, he played in 16 games, while starting in five. On March 16, 2022, he re-signed with the Jets on another one-year deal.

=== Miami Dolphins ===
On March 17, 2023, Feeney signed a one-year contract with the Miami Dolphins.

=== Chicago Bears ===
On August 29, 2023, the Dolphins traded Feeney to the Chicago Bears for a 2024 sixth-round pick.

=== Minnesota Vikings ===
On March 15, 2024, Feeney signed a one-year deal with the Minnesota Vikings.

=== Buffalo Bills ===
On August 4, 2025, Feeney signed with the Buffalo Bills. He was released on August 26 as part of final roster cuts and re-signed to the practice squad the next day.

=== Tampa Bay Buccaneers ===
On September 18, 2025, the Tampa Bay Buccaneers signed Feeney to their active roster off of Buffalo's practice squad.

On March 16, 2026, Feeney re-signed with the Buccaneers.

== Personal life ==
Feeney is the son of Tony and Kim Feeney, and has a sister, Shannon Feeney. He currently donates to the MS society.
