= Indiana Hoosiers football statistical leaders =

The Indiana Hoosiers football statistical leaders are individual statistical leaders of the Indiana Hoosiers football program in various categories, including passing, rushing, receiving, total offense, defensive stats, kicking, and scoring. Within those areas, the lists identify single-game, single-season, and career leaders. The Hoosiers represent Indiana University Bloomington (IU) in the NCAA Division I FBS Big Ten Conference.

Although Indiana began competing in intercollegiate football in 1892, the school's official record book considers the "modern era" to have begun in 1948. Records from before this year are often incomplete and inconsistent, and they are generally not included in these lists.

These lists are dominated by more recent players for several reasons:

- Since 1948, seasons have increased from 10 games to 11 and then 12 games in length.
- The NCAA didn't allow freshmen to play varsity football until 1972 (with the exception of the World War II years), allowing players to have four-year careers.
- Bowl games only began counting toward single-season and career statistics in 2002. However, Indiana has only played in nine postseason games since then: the 2007 Insight Bowl, 2015 Pinstripe Bowl, 2016 Foster Farms Bowl, 2020 Gator Bowl, 2021 Outback Bowl, the first round of the 2024–25 College Football Playoff (2024 season), and three College Football Playoff games in the 2025 season (2026 Rose Bowl, 2026 Peach Bowl, and the 2026 College Football Playoff National Championship).
- From 2018 through 2025, players were allowed to participate in as many as four games in a redshirt season; previously, playing in even one game "burned" the redshirt. In 2024 and 2025, postseason games did not count against the four-game limit. These changes to redshirt rules gave players during that time several extra games to accumulate statistics.
- Starting in 2026, redshirting has been prohibited, but players have five years of full athletic eligibility. Players who had remaining eligibility under previous rules at the end of the 2025 season will benefit from the new rule. The first recruiting class to be fully affected by the new rule is the 2027 entering class.
- The Big Ten has held a championship game since 2011, giving players the opportunity for another extra game. IU played in (and won) the 2025 edition.
- Due to COVID-19 disruptions, the NCAA did not count the 2020 season against the eligibility of any football player, giving all players active in that season five years of eligibility instead of the then-normal four. However, the Big Ten played an abbreviated six-game regular season in 2020.
- Indiana broke school team records in offensive yards and points during the tenure of coach Kevin Wilson (2011-2016). During IU's first season under current head coach Curt Cignetti in 2024, it set new program records for touchdowns and total points.

These lists are updated through Week 12 of the 2026 season. Players active for IU in 2026 are in bold.

== Passing ==
=== Passing yards ===
Career
Rank	Player	Yards	Years
1	Nate Sudfeld	7,879	2012 2013 2014 2015
2	Antwaan Randle El	7,469	1998 1999 2000 2001
3	Ben Chappell	7,251	2007 2008 2009 2010
4	Peyton Ramsey	6,581	2017 2018 2019
5	Steve Bradley	6,579	1983 1984 1985
6	Kellen Lewis	6,395	2006 2007 2008
7	Dave Schnell	5,470	1986 1987 1988 1989
8	Trent Green	5,400	1989 1990 1991 1992
9	Richard Lagow	5,298	2016 2017
10	Tim Clifford	4,338	1977 1978 1979 1980

Single season
Rank	Player	Yards	Year
1	Nate Sudfeld	3,573	2015
2	Fernando Mendoza	3,535	2025
3	Richard Lagow	3,362	2016
4	Kellen Lewis	3,043	2007
5	Kurtis Rourke	3,042	2024
6	Ben Chappell	2,941	2009
7	Peyton Ramsey	2,875	2018
8	Cameron Coffman	2,734	2012
9	Trent Green	2,627	1991
10	Steve Bradley	2,544	1984

Single game
Rank	Player	Yards	Year	Opponent
1	Richard Lagow	496	2016	Wake Forest
2	Michael Penix Jr.	491	2020	Ohio State
3	Richard Lagow	489	2017	Ohio State
4	Ben Chappell	480	2010	Michigan
5	Nate Sudfeld	464	2015	Rutgers
6	Cameron Coffman	455	2012	Penn State
7	Jay Rodgers	408	1997	Ball State
8	Richard Lagow	394	2016	Rutgers
9	Babe Laufenberg	390	1982	Iowa
10	Nate Sudfeld	389	2015	Duke (Pinstripe Bowl)

=== Passing touchdowns ===
Career
Rank	Player	TDs	Years
1	Nate Sudfeld	61	2012 2013 2014 2015
2	Kellen Lewis	48	2006 2007 2008
3	Ben Chappell	45	2007 2008 2009 2010
4	Antwaan Randle El	42	1998 1999 2000 2001
	Peyton Ramsey	42	2017 2018 2019
6	Fernando Mendoza	41	2025
7	Steve Bradley	35	1983 1984 1985
8	Richard Lagow	34	2016 2017
9	Harry Gonso	32	1967 1968 1969
10	Tim Clifford	31	1977 1978 1979 1980

Single season
Rank	Player	TDs	Year
1	Fernando Mendoza	41	2025
2	Kurtis Rourke	29	2024
3	Kellen Lewis	28	2007
4	Nate Sudfeld	27	2015
5	Ben Chappell	24	2010
6	Blake Powers	22	2005
7	Nate Sudfeld	21	2013
8	**Josh Hoover**	20	2026
9	Richard Lagow	19	2016
	Peyton Ramsey	19	2018

Single game
Rank	Player	TDs	Year	Opponent
1	Bob Hoernschemeyer	6	1943	Nebraska
	Tre Roberson	6	2013	Purdue
	Kurtis Rourke	6	2024	Purdue
4	Tim Clifford	5	1980	Colorado
	Jay Rodgers	5	1997	Ball State
	Kellen Lewis	5	2006	Michigan State
	Michael Penix Jr.	5	2020	Ohio State
	Fernando Mendoza	5	2025	Indiana State
	Fernando Mendoza	5	2025	Illinois
	Fernando Mendoza	5	2025	Oregon (Peach Bowl)

== Rushing ==
=== Rushing yards ===
Career
Rank	Player	Yards	Years
1	Anthony Thompson	5,299	1986 1987 1988 1989
2	Antwaan Randle El	3,895	1998 1999 2000 2001
3	Alex Smith	3,492	1994 1995 1996
4	Mike Harkrader	3,257	1976 1978 1979 1980
5	Tevin Coleman	3,219	2012 2013 2014
6	Levron Williams	3,095	1998 1999 2000 2001
7	Vaughn Dunbar	3,029	1990 1991
8	Courtney Snyder	2,789	1973 1974 1975 1976
9	Stevie Scott III	2,543	2018 2019 2020
10	John Isenbarger	2,453	1967 1968 1969

Single season
Rank	Player	Yards	Year
1	Tevin Coleman	2,036	2014
2	Vaughn Dunbar	1,805	1991
3	Anthony Thompson	1,793	1989
4	Anthony Thompson	1,686	1988
5	Alex Smith	1,475	1994
6	Levron Williams	1,401	2001
7	Antwaan Randle El	1,270	2000
8	Courtney Snyder	1,254	1974
9	Alex Smith	1,248	1996
10	Vaughn Dunbar	1,224	1990

Single game
Rank	Player	Yards	Year	Opponent
1	Anthony Thompson	377	1989	Wisconsin
2	Tevin Coleman	307	2014	Rutgers
3	Levron Williams	280	2001	Wisconsin
4	Vaughn Dunbar	265	1991	Missouri
5	Levron Williams	254	2001	Michigan State
6	Tevin Coleman	247	2014	Indiana State
7	Alex Smith	245	1994	Purdue
8	Levron Williams	241	1999	Northwestern
9	Brett Law	240	1992	Missouri
10	Jordan Howard	238	2015	Michigan

=== Rushing touchdowns ===
Career
Rank	Player	TDs	Years
1	Anthony Thompson	67	1986 1987 1988 1989
2	Antwaan Randle El	44	1998 1999 2000 2001
3	Levron Williams	31	1998 1999 2000 2001
4	Stevie Scott III	30	2018 2019 2020
5	Tevin Coleman	28	2012 2013 2014
6	Vaughn Dunbar	25	1990 1991
	Stephen Houston	25	2011 2012 2013
8	Alex Smith	21	1994 1995 1996
9	Trent Green	20	1989 1990
10	Lonnie Johnson	19	1977 1978 1979 1980

Single season
Rank	Player	TDs	Year
1	Anthony Thompson	26	1988
2	Anthony Thompson	24	1989
3	Levron Williams	17	2001
4	Tevin Coleman	15	2014
5	Vaughn Dunbar	13	1990
	Trent Green	13	1991
	Antwaan Randle El	13	1999
	Antwaan Randle El	13	2000
9	Anthony Thompson	12	1987
	Vaughn Dunbar	12	1991
	Stephen Houston	12	2012
	Tevin Coleman	12	2013
	Ty Son Lawton	12	2024

Single game
Rank	Player	TDs	Year	Opponent
1	Levron Williams	6	2001	Wisconsin
2	Anthony Thompson	5	1989	Northwestern
3	Anthony Thompson	4	1988	Ohio State

== Receiving ==
=== Receptions ===
Career
Rank	Player	Rec	Years
1	James Hardy	191	2005 2006 2007
2	Damarlo Belcher	189	2008 2009 2010 2011
	Shane Wynn	189	2011 2012 2013 2014
4	Whop Philyor	180	2017 2018 2019 2020
5	Courtney Roby	170	2001 2002 2003 2004
6	Ty Fryfogle	158	2017 2018 2019 2020 2021
7	Tandon Doss	154	2008 2009 2010
8	Thomas Lewis	148	1991 1992 1993
9	Nick Westbrook-Ikhine	144	2015 2016 2017 2018 2019
10	Terrance Turner	143	2007 2008 2009 2010

Single season
Rank	Player	Rec	Year
1	James Hardy	79	2007
2	Damarlo Belcher	78	2010
3	Tandon Doss	77	2009
4	Cody Latimer	72	2013
5	Whop Philyor	70	2019
6	Omar Cooper Jr.	69	2025
7	Shane Wynn	68	2012
8	Terrance Turner	67	2010
9	Ernie Jones	66	1987
10	Elijah Sarratt	65	2025

Single game
Rank	Player	Rec	Year	Opponent
1	Whop Philyor	18	2020	Ole Miss (Outback Bowl)
2	Jason Spear	16	1997	Purdue
3	Tandon Doss	15	2010	Michigan
4	James Hardy	14	2007	Penn State
	Whop Philyor	14	2019	Michigan State
	Whop Philyor	14	2019	Nebraska
7	Tyrone Browning	13	1998	Western Michigan
8	Thomas Lewis	12	1992	Michigan State
	Thomas Lewis	12	1993	Penn State
	James Hardy	12	2005	Iowa
	Shane Wynn	12	2012	Michigan State
	Shane Wynn	12	2012	Penn State
	Stephen Houston	12	2012	Purdue

=== Receiving yards ===
Career
Rank	Player	Yards	Years
1	James Hardy	2,740	2005 2006 2007
2	Courtney Roby	2,524	2001 2002 2003 2004
3	Ernie Jones	2,361	1984 1985 1986 1987
4	Thomas Lewis	2,324	1991 1992 1993
5	Duane Gunn	2,235	1981 1982 1983
6	Ty Fryfogle	2,231	2017 2018 2019 2020 2021
7	Nick Westbrook-Ikhine	2,226	2015 2016 2017 2018 2019
8	Damarlo Belcher	2,225	2008 2009 2010 2011
9	Shane Wynn	2,198	2011 2012 2013 2014
10	Whop Philyor	2,067	2017 2018 2019 2020

Single season
Rank	Player	Yards	Year
1	Ernie Jones	1,265	1987
2	James Hardy	1,125	2007
3	**Charlie Becker**	1,117	2026
4	Cody Latimer	1,096	2013
5	Thomas Lewis	1,058	1993
6	Courtney Roby	1,039	2002
7	Simmie Cobbs Jr.	1,035	2015
8	Whop Philyor	1,002	2019
9	Nick Westbrook-Ikhine	995	2016
10	Tandon Doss	962	2009

Single game
Rank	Player	Yards	Year	Opponent
1	Thomas Lewis	285	1993	Penn State
2	Tyrone Browning	258	1998	Western Michigan
3	Nate Lundy	256	1980	Colorado
4	Tandon Doss	221	2010	Michigan
5	Ty Fryfogle	218	2020	Ohio State
6	Ricky Jones	208	2016	Wake Forest
7	Omar Cooper Jr.	207	2025	Indiana State
8	James Hardy	203	2005	Iowa
9	Ty Fryfogle	200	2020	Michigan State
10	Courtney Roby	198	2002	Iowa

=== Receiving touchdowns ===
Career
Rank	Player	TDs	Years
1	James Hardy	36	2005 2006 2007
2	Jade Butcher	30	1967 1968 1969
3	Elijah Sarratt	23	2024 2025
4	Omar Cooper Jr.	22	2023 2024 2025
5	Ernie Jones	20	1984 1985 1986 1987
	Shane Wynn	20	2011 2012 2013 2014
7	Thomas Lewis	18	1991 1992 1993
8	Cody Latimer	17	2011 2012 2013
9	Nick Westbrook-Ikhine	16	2015 2016 2017 2018 2019
10	Trent Smock	15	1973 1974 1975
	**Charlie Becker**	15	2025 2026
	Ted Bolser	15	2010 2011 2012 2013

Single season
Rank	Player	TDs	Year
1	James Hardy	16	2007
2	Elijah Sarratt	15	2025
3	Ernie Jones	13	1987
	Omar Cooper Jr.	13	2025
5	Shane Wynn	11	2013
	**Charlie Becker**	11	2026
7	Jade Butcher	10	1967
	Jade Butcher	10	1968
	Jade Butcher	10	1969
	James Hardy	10	2005
	James Hardy	10	2006

Single game
Rank	Player	TDs	Year	Opponent
1	James Hardy	4	2006	Michigan State
	Omar Cooper Jr.	4	2025	Indiana State

== Total offense ==
Total offense is the sum of passing and rushing statistics. It does not include receiving or returns.

=== Total offense yards ===
Career
Rank	Player	Yards	Years
1	Antwaan Randle El	11,364	1998 1999 2000 2001
2	Kellen Lewis	8,072	2006 2007 2008
3	Nate Sudfeld	8,011	2012 2013 2014 2015
4	Ben Chappell	7,331	2007 2008 2009 2010
5	Steve Bradley	6,943	1983 1984 1985
6	Peyton Ramsey	6,753	2017 2018 2019
7	Dave Schnell	6,073	1986 1987 1988 1989
8	Trent Green	5,916	1989 1990
9	Anthony Thompson	5,299	1986 1987 1988 1989
10	Tim Clifford	4,561	1977 1978 1979 1980

Single season
Rank	Player	Yards	Year
1	Fernando Mendoza	3,811	2025
2	Kellen Lewis	3,779	2007
3	Nate Sudfeld	3,634	2015
4	Ben Chappell	3,309	2010
5	Peyton Ramsey	3,229	2018
6	Richard Lagow	3,174	2016
7	Antwaan Randle El	3,065	1999
8	Antwaan Randle El	3,053	2000
9	Kurtis Rourke	3,007	2024
10	Ben Chappell	2,932	2009

Single game
Rank	Player	Yards	Year	Opponent
1	Michael Penix Jr.	489	2020	Ohio State
2	Richard Lagow	488	2016	Wake Forest
3	Ben Chappell	475	2010	Michigan
4	Antwaan Randle El	473	2000	Minnesota
5	Antwaan Randle El	467	1998	Western Michigan
6	Bob Hoernschemeyer	458	1943	Nebraska
7	Nate Sudfeld	456	2015	Rutgers
8	Cameron Coffman	437	2012	Penn State
9	Tre Roberson	427	2013	Purdue
10	Antwaan Randle El	422	1999	Illinois

=== Touchdowns responsible for ===
"Touchdowns responsible for" is the NCAA's official term for combined passing and rushing touchdowns.

Career
Rank	Player	TDs	Years
1	Antwaan Randle El	86	1998 1999 2000 2001
2	Nate Sudfeld	69	2012 2013 2014 2015
3	Anthony Thompson	67	1986 1987 1988 1989
4	Kellen Lewis	65	2006 2007 2008
5	Ben Chappell	54	2007 2008 2009 2010
6	Peyton Ramsey	49	2017 2018 2019
7	Fernando Mendoza	48	2025
8	Trent Green	43	1989 1990
9	Harry Gonso	42	1967 1968 1969
	Tim Clifford	42	1977 1978 1979 1980
	Steve Bradley	42	1983 1984 1985
	Dave Schnell	42	1986 1987 1988 1989

Single season
Rank	Player	TDs	Year
1	Fernando Mendoza	48	2025
2	Kellen Lewis	37	2007
3	Nate Sudfeld	32	2015
4	Kurtis Rourke	31	2024
5	Antwaan Randle El	30	1999
6	Ben Chappell	27	2010
7	Anthony Thompson	26	1988
	Blake Powers	26	2005
9	Trent Green	25	1991
10	Anthony Thompson	24	1989
	Peyton Ramsey	24	2018

Single game
Rank	Player	TDs	Year	Opponent
1	Bob Hoernschemeyer	6	1943	Nebraska
	Levron Williams	6	2001	Wisconsin
	Kellen Lewis	6	2006	Michigan State
	Tre Roberson	6	2013	Purdue
	Kurtis Rourke	6	2024	Purdue
	Fernando Mendoza	6	2025	Indiana State

== Defense ==
=== Interceptions ===
Career
Rank	Player	Ints	Years
1	Tim Wilbur	18	1978 1979 1980 1982
2	Tracy Porter	16	2004 2005 2006 2007
3	John Cannady	11	1943 1944 1945 1946
	Dave Abrams	11	1977 1978
	Lance Brown	11	1991 1992 1993 1994
	Amare Ferrell	11	2023 2024 2025 2026
6	John McDonnell	10	1943 1946 1947 1948
	Eric Allen	10	1994 1995 1996
8	Chris Sigler	9	1981 1982 1983 1984
	Greg Heban	9	2010 2011 2012 2013
	Jabar Robinson	9	1995 1996 1997 1998
	Jonathan Crawford	9	2015 2016 2017 2018
	Louis Moore	9	2022 2023 2025

Single season
Rank	Player	Ints	Year
1	Tim Wilbur	7	1979
	Dave Abrams	7	1977
3	John Cannady	6	1946
	Milt Campbell	6	1955
	Tim Wilbur	6	1978
	Mark Sutor	6	1982
	Tracy Porter	6	2007
	Louis Moore	6	2025

Single game
Rank	Player	Ints	Year	Opponent
1	Florian Helinski	3	1954	Michigan
	Milt Campbell	3	1955	Ohio
	Ben Norman	3	1968	Baylor
	Tim Wilbur	3	1979	Illinois
	Greg Yeldell	3	1998	Michigan

=== Tackles ===
Career
Rank	Player	Tackles	Years
1	Joe Norman	444	1975 1976 1977 1978
2	Willie Bates	384	1988 1989 1990 1991
3	Donnie Thomas	369	1973 1974 1975
4	Craig Walls	342	1978 1979 1980 1981
	Herana-Daze Jones	342	2001 2002 2003 2004
6	Jabar Robinson	339	1995 1996 1997 1998
7	Mark Weiler	336	1981 1982 1983 1984
	Mark Hagen	336	1987 1989 1990 1991
9	Justin Smith	326	1998 1999 2000 2001
10	Tegray Scales	324	2014 2015 2016 2017

Single season
Rank	Player	Tackles	Year
1	Joe Norman	199	1978
2	Steve Sanders	165	1976
3	Joe Fitzgerald	155	1984
4	Mark Weiler	143	1984
5	Craig Brinkman	141	1974
6	Donnie Thomas	137	1975
7	Donnie Thomas	134	1974
8	Brad Mitchell	132	1985
9	Mike Fulk	126	1972
	Tegray Scales	126	2016

Single game
Rank	Player	Tackles	Year	Opponent
1	Joe Norman	26	1978	Ohio State
2	Karl Pankratz	25	1969	Wisconsin
	Donnie Thomas	25	1975	Ohio State
4	Don Silas	24	1968	Minnesota
	Steve Sanders	24	1976	Purdue
	Doug Sybert	24	1978	Ohio State
	Marlin Evans	24	1980	Ohio State

=== Sacks ===
Career
Rank	Player	Sacks	Years
1	Adewale Ogunleye	34.5	1996 1997 1998 1999
2	Van Waiters	25.0	1983 1984 1985 1986
3	Jammie Kirlew	23.0	2006 2007 2008 2009
	Greg Middleton	23.0	2006 2007 2008 2009
5	Greg Farrall	22.0	1988 1989 1990 1991
6	Joe Huff	17.0	1984 1985 1986 1987
	Tegray Scales	17.0	2014 2015 2016 2017
8	Kemp Rasmussen	16.5	1998 1999 2000 2001
9	Hurvin McCormick	16.0	1990 1991 1992 1993
10	Adam Replogle	15.0	2009 2010 2011 2012

Single season
Rank	Player	Sacks	Year
1	Greg Middleton	16.0	2007
2	Van Waiters	14.0	1987
3	Joe Huff	11.0	1988
4	Jammie Kirlew	10.5	2008
5	Adewale Ogunleye	10.0	1997
	Mikail Kamara	10.0	2024
7	Nick Mangieri	9.5	2015
8	Adewale Ogunleye	8.5	1996
9	Greg Farrall	8.0	1989
	Greg Farrall	8.0	1991
	Lamar Mills	8.0	1992
	Adewale Ogunleye	8.0	1998
	Adewale Ogunleye	8.0	1999
	**Rolijah Hardy**	8.0	2025

Single game
Rank	Player	Sacks	Year	Opponent
1	Van Waiters	4.0	1986	Michigan State
	Adewale Ogunleye	4.0	1997	Ohio State
	Matt Mayberry	4.0	2006	Central Michigan
4	Jammie Kirlew	3.5	2007	Iowa

== Kicking ==
=== Field goals made ===
Career
Rank	Player	FGs	Years
1	Griffin Oakes	69	2014 2015 2016 2017
2	Mitch Ewald	53	2010 2011 2012 2013
3	Scott Bonnell	48	1989 1990 1991 1992
4	Pete Stoyanovich	47	1985 1986 1987 1988
5	Bill Manolopoulous	44	1993 1994 1995 1996
6	Andy Payne	43	1997 1998 1999 2000
6	Austin Starr	43	2005 2006 2007 2008
8	**Nico Radicic**	40	2023 2024 2025 2026
9	Charles Campbell	39	2019 2020 2021 2022
10	Bryan Robertson	33	2001 2002 2003 2004

Single season
Rank	Player	FGs	Year
1	Griffin Oakes	24	2015
2	Austin Starr	21	2007
3	**Nico Radicic**	18	2025
4	Pete Stoyanovich	17	1988
4	Logan Justus	17	2019
6	Bill Manolopoulos	16	1993
6	Mitch Ewald	16	2010
6	Griffin Oakes	16	2016
9	Andy Payne	15	1997
9	Mitch Ewald	15	2012
9	Logan Justus	15	2018

Single game
Rank	Player	FGs	Year	Opponent
1	Chris Gartner	4	1971	Kentucky
1	Chris Gartner	4	1972	Wisconsin
1	Andy Payne	4	1997	Wisconsin
1	Andy Payne	4	1997	Minnesota
1	Austin Starr	4	2007	Minnesota
1	Nick Freeland	4	2009	Michigan
1	Griffin Oakes	4	2015	Michigan
1	Griffin Oakes	4	2015	Maryland
1	Charles Campbell	4	2021	Western Kentucky
1	Charles Campbell	4	2022	Western Kentucky

=== Field goal percentage ===
Career
Rank	Player	FG%	Years
1	**Nico Radicic**	83.3%	2023 2024 2025 2026
2	Logan Justus	82.1%	2018 2019
3	Mitch Ewald	80.3%	2010 2011 2012 2013
4	Austin Starr	78.2%	2005 2006 2007 2008
5	Griffin Oakes	76.6%	2014 2015 2016 2017
6	Charles Campbell	76.5%	2019 2020 2021 2022
7	Andy Payne	74.1%	1997 1998 1999 2000
8	Chris Freeman	71.4%	2021 2023
9	Bryan Robertson	68.8%	2001 2002 2003 2004
10	Bill Manolopoulous	67.7%	1993 1994 1995 1996

Single season
Rank	Player	FG%	Year
1	**Nico Radicic**	94.7%	2025
2	Griffin Oakes	94.1%	2017
3	Austin Starr	91.3%	2007
4	Charles Campbell	90.9%	2020
4	**Nico Radicic**	90.9%	2024
6	Mitch Ewald	84.2%	2010
7	Andy Payne	83.3%	1998
7	Logan Justus	83.3%	2018
9	Griffin Oakes	82.8%	2015
10	Mitch Ewald	81.8%	2013

=== Longest field goals ===
Single game
Rank	Player	Yards	Year	Opponent
1	**Paddy McAteer**	60	2026	Minnesota
2	Griffin Oakes	58	2014	Maryland
	Brendan Franke	58	2025	Oregon (Note: This was the regularly scheduled game between the two teams. They also played in that season's College Football Playoff semifinals at the 2026 Peach Bowl.)
4	Scott Bonnell	55	1989	Michigan
	Charles Campbell	55	2021	Maryland
6	Pete Stoyanovich	53	1988	Kentucky
	Pete Stoyanovich	53	1988	Michigan
	Andy Payne	53	2000	Minnesota
	Charles Campbell	53	2020	Ole Miss (Outback Bowl)
10	8 times by 5 players	52	Most recent: Charles Campbell, 2020 vs. Michigan	

== Scoring ==
=== Points ===
Career
Rank	Player	Pts	Years
1	Anthony Thompson	412	1986 1987 1988 1989
2	Griffin Oakes	354	2014 2015 2016 2017
3	Mitch Ewald	320	2010 2011 2012 2013
4	**Nico Radicic**	299	2023 2024 2025 2026
5	Antwaan Randle El	270	1998 1999 2000 2001
6	Scott Bonnell	261	1989 1990 1991 1992
7	Pete Stoyanovich	248	1985 1986 1987 1988
8	Andy Payne	238	1997 1998 1999 2000
9	Austin Starr	232	2005 2006 2007 2008
10	Levron Williams	230	1998 1999 2000 2001

Single season
Rank	Player	Pts	Year
1	Anthony Thompson	156	1988
2	Anthony Thompson	154	1989
3	**Nico Radicic**	141	2025
4	Griffin Oakes	125	2015
5	Levron Williams	114	2001
6	Austin Starr	111	2007
7	**Nico Radicic**	99	2024
8	Stephen Houston	98	2012
9	Pete Stoyanovich	96	1988
	James Hardy	96	2007
	Logan Justus	96	2019

Single game
Rank	Player	Pts	Year	Opponent
1	Levron Williams	36	2001	Wisconsin
2	Anthony Thompson	32	1989	Northwestern
3	Anthony Thompson	24	1988	Ohio State
	Anthony Thompson	24	1989	Wisconsin
	Antwaan Randle El	24	2000	Illinois
	James Hardy	24	2007	Michigan State
	Omar Cooper Jr.	24	2025	Indiana State
8	Tom Nowatzke	21	1964	Oregon
9	Glenn Scolnik	20	1972	Kentucky
	Anthony Thompson	20	1989	Ohio State
	Yamar Washington	20	2002	Northwestern
	Jordan Howard	20	2015	Michigan

=== Touchdowns ===
In contrast to "touchdowns responsible for", this indicates touchdowns scored. It includes rushing, receiving, and return touchdowns, but not passing touchdowns.

Career
Rank	Player	TDs	Years
1	Anthony Thompson	68	1986 1987 1988 1989
2	Antwaan Randle El	45	1998 1999 2000 2001
3	Levron Williams	38	1998 1999 2000 2001
4	James Hardy	36	2005 2006 2007
5	Stevie Scott III	32	2018 2019 2020
6	Jade Butcher	30	1967 1968 1969
7	Stephen Houston	29	2011 2012 2013
	Tevin Coleman	29	2012 2013 2014
9	Vaughn Dunbar	25	1990 1991
	Shane Wynn	25	2011 2012 2013 2014

Single season
Rank	Player	TDs	Year
1	Anthony Thompson	26	1988
2	Anthony Thompson	25	1989
3	Levron Williams	19	2001
4	James Hardy	16	2007
	Stephen Houston	16	2012
6	Tevin Coleman	15	2014
	Elijah Sarratt	15	2025
8	Omar Cooper Jr.	14	2025

Single game
Rank	Player	TDs	Year	Opponent
1	Levron Williams	6	2001	Wisconsin
2	Anthony Thompson	5	1989	Northwestern
3	Anthony Thompson	4	1988	Ohio State
	Anthony Thompson	4	1989	Wisconsin
	Antwaan Randle El	4	2000	Illinois
	James Hardy	4	2007	Michigan State
	Omar Cooper Jr.	4	2025	Indiana State
8	67 times	3	Most recent: Charlie Becker, 2026 vs. Howard	
