= 2004 Indiana Hoosiers football team =

American college football season

2004 Indiana Hoosiers football
- Conference: Big Ten Conference
- Record: 3–8 (1–7 Big Ten)
- Head coach: Gerry DiNardo (3rd season)
- Offensive coordinator: Steve Addazio (1st season)
- Defensive coordinator: Joe Cullen (1st season)
- MVP: Courtney Roby
- Captains: Jodie Clemons; Herana-Daze Jones; Courtney Roby
- Home stadium: Memorial Stadium

2004 Big Ten Conference football standings
	Conf.			Overall
Team	W		L	W		L
No. 14 Michigan $+	7	–	1	9	–	3
No. 8 Iowa +	7	–	1	10	–	2
No. 17 Wisconsin	6	–	2	9	–	3
Northwestern	5	–	3	6	–	6
No. 20 Ohio State	4	–	4	8	–	4
Purdue	4	–	4	7	–	5
Michigan State	4	–	4	5	–	7
Minnesota	3	–	5	7	–	5
Penn State	2	–	6	4	–	7
Illinois	1	–	7	3	–	8
Indiana	1	–	7	3	–	8
$ – BCS representative as conference champion; + – Conference co-champions; Rankings from AP Poll

The 2004 Indiana Hoosiers football team represented Indiana University Bloomington during the 2004 NCAA Division I-A football season. They participated as members of the Big Ten Conference. The Hoosiers played their home games at Memorial Stadium in Bloomington, Indiana. The team was coached by Gerry DiNardo in his third and final year as head coach. At the end of the season, DiNardo was fired and replaced by Terry Hoeppner.

== Schedule ==
Date	Time	Opponent	Site	TV	Result	Attendance	Source
September 4	6:00 pm	Central Michigan*	Memorial Stadium; Bloomington, IN		W 41–10	36,041	
September 11	5:30 pm	at No. 23 Oregon*	Autzen Stadium; Eugene, OR		W 30–24	23,813	
September 18	6:00 pm	at Kentucky*	Commonwealth Stadium; Lexington, KY (rivalry)		L 35–51	65,532	
September 25	12:00 pm	Michigan State	Memorial Stadium; Bloomington, IN (rivalry)	ESPN Plus	L 20–30	24,471	
October 2	3:30 pm	No. 18 Michigan	Memorial Stadium; Bloomington, IN	ABC	L 14–35	35,001	
October 9	12:00 pm	at Northwestern	Ryan Field; Evanston, IL	ESPN Plus	L 24–31 ^{2OT}	22,688	
October 23	12:00 pm	at Ohio State	Ohio Stadium; Columbus, OH	ESPN Plus	L 7–30	104,538	
October 30	1:00 pm	No. 23 Minnesota^{†}	Memorial Stadium; Bloomington, IN		W 30–21	22,282	
November 6	2:00 pm	at Illinois	Memorial Stadium; Champaign, IL (rivalry)		L 22–26	41,458	
November 13	12:00 pm	Penn State	Memorial Stadium; Bloomington, IN	ESPN Plus	L 18–22	24,092	
November 18	12:00 pm	at Purdue	Ross–Ade Stadium; West Lafayette, IN (Old Oaken Bucket)	ESPN Plus	L 24–63	65,137	
*Non-conference game; ^{†}Homecoming; Rankings from Coaches' Poll released prior to the game; All times are in Eastern time

== Roster ==
2004 Indiana Hoosiers football team roster
Players
Coaches
Offense

Pos.	#	Name	Class
WR	1	Jahkeen Gilmore	Jr
WR	82	James Hardy	Fr
WR	81	Rhett Kleinschmidt	Jr
QB	12	Graeme McFarland	So
G	61	Isaac Sowells	Jr
RB	30	Chris Taylor	Jr
RB	2	Marcus Thigpen	Fr

Defense

Pos.	#	Name	Class
DE	94	Victor Adeyanju	Jr
DE	99	Ben Ishola	So
LB	43	Kyle Killion	Jr
CB	8	Buster Larkins	Jr
CB	9	Tracy Porter	Fr

Special teams

Pos.	#	Name	Class

Head coach

- Gerry DiNardo

Coordinators/assistant coaches

Legend

- (C) Team captain
- (S) Suspended
- (I) Ineligible
- Injured
- Redshirt

== 2005 NFL draftees ==
Player	Round	Pick	Position	NFL club
Courtney Roby	3	68	Wide receiver	Tennessee Titans
