= 2006 Indiana Hoosiers football team =

American college football season

2006 Indiana Hoosiers football
- Conference: Big Ten Conference
- Record: 5–7 (3–5 Big Ten)
- Head coach: Terry Hoeppner (2nd season)
- Offensive coordinator: Bill Lynch (2nd season)
- Co-defensive coordinators: Brian George (2nd season); Joe Palcic (2nd season)
- MVP: Kellen Lewis
- Captains: Lance Bennett; Justin Frye; Kenny Kendal; Will Meyers
- Home stadium: Memorial Stadium

2006 Big Ten Conference football standings
	Conf.			Overall
Team	W		L	W		L
No. 2 Ohio State $	8	–	0	12	–	1
No. 8 Michigan %	7	–	1	11	–	2
No. 7 Wisconsin	7	–	1	12	–	1
No. 24 Penn State	5	–	3	9	–	4
Purdue	5	–	3	8	–	6
Minnesota	3	–	5	6	–	7
Indiana	3	–	5	5	–	7
Northwestern	2	–	6	4	–	8
Iowa	2	–	6	6	–	7
Illinois	1	–	7	2	–	10
Michigan State	1	–	7	4	–	8
$ – BCS representative as conference champion; % – BCS at-large representative; Rankings from AP Poll

The 2006 Indiana Hoosiers football team represented Indiana University Bloomington during the 2006 NCAA Division I FBS football season. The Hoosiers were coached by Terry Hoeppner, who was in his final season as head coach before he died of brain cancer in mid-2007. The Hoosiers played their home games at Memorial Stadium in Bloomington, Indiana.

This was also the first season the Hoosiers started games at the same local time with other teams in the Eastern Time Zone, as the State of Indiana began observing Daylight Saving Time earlier in the year.

== Schedule ==
Date	Time	Opponent	Site	TV	Result	Attendance	Source
September 2	6:00 pm	Western Michigan*	Memorial Stadium; Bloomington, IN		W 39–20	30,733	
September 9	6:30 pm	at Ball State*	Scheumann Stadium; Muncie, IN	Comcast	W 24–23	23,813	
September 16	4:00 pm	Southern Illinois*	Memorial Stadium; Bloomington, IN	Mediacom	L 28–35	31,156	
September 23	3:30 pm	Connecticut*	Memorial Stadium; Bloomington, IN	ESPN Plus	L 7–14	27,256	
September 30	12:00 pm	Wisconsin	Memorial Stadium; Bloomington, IN	ESPN2	L 17–52	32,142	
October 7	12:00 pm	at Illinois	Memorial Stadium; Champaign, IL (rivalry)	ESPN Plus	W 34–32	43,006	
October 14	12:00 pm	No. 13 Iowa	Memorial Stadium; Bloomington, IN	ESPN2	W 31–28	31,392	
October 21	12:00 pm	at No. 1 Ohio State	Ohio Stadium; Columbus, OH	ESPNU	L 3–44	105,267	
October 28	12:00 pm	Michigan State^{†}	Memorial Stadium; Bloomington, IN (rivalry)	ESPN Plus	W 46–21	36,444	
November 4	12:00 pm	at Minnesota	Hubert H. Humphrey Metrodome; Minneapolis, MN	ESPN360	L 26–63	44,610	
November 11	3:30 pm	No. 2 Michigan	Memorial Stadium; Bloomington, IN	ESPN	L 3–34	42,320	
November 18	3:30 pm	at Purdue	Ross–Ade Stadium; West Lafayette, IN (Old Oaken Bucket)	ESPN Classic	L 19–28	62,105	
*Non-conference game; ^{†}Homecoming; Rankings from Coaches' Poll released prior to the game; All times are in Eastern time

This was the first season the Hoosiers started games at the same local time with other teams in the Eastern Time Zone, as the State of Indiana began observing Daylight Saving Time earlier in the year.

== Roster ==
2005 Indiana Hoosiers football team roster
Players
Coaches
Offense

Pos.	#	Name	Class
WR	1	Jahkeen Gilmore	Sr
WR	82	James Hardy	So
QB	12	Graeme McFarland	Sr
OT	76	Rodger Saffold	Fr
RB	2	Marcus Thigpen	So

Defense

Pos.	#	Name	Class
DE	57	Jammie Kirlew	Fr
LB	43	Matt Mayberry	Fr
DE	98	Greg Middleton	Fr
LB	34	Will Patterson	Fr
CB	9	Tracy Porter	Jr

Special teams

Pos.	#	Name	Class

Head coach

- Terry Hoeppner

Coordinators/assistant coaches

Legend

- (C) Team captain
- (S) Suspended
- (I) Ineligible
- Injured
- Redshirt
