= 2001 Indiana Hoosiers football team =

American college football season

2001 Indiana Hoosiers football
- Conference: Big Ten Conference
- Record: 5–6 (4–4 Big Ten)
- Head coach: Cam Cameron (5th season)
- Offensive coordinator: Hal Hunter (2nd season)
- Defensive coordinator: James Bell (2nd season)
- MVPs: Antwaan Randle El; Levron Williams
- Captains: Antwaan Randle El; Kemp Rasmussen
- Home stadium: Memorial Stadium

2001 Big Ten Conference football standings
	Conf.			Overall
Team	W		L	W		L
No. 12 Illinois $	7	–	1	10	–	2
No. 20 Michigan	6	–	2	8	–	4
Ohio State	5	–	3	7	–	5
Iowa	4	–	4	7	–	5
Purdue	4	–	4	6	–	6
Penn State	4	–	4	5	–	6
Indiana	4	–	4	5	–	6
Michigan State	3	–	5	7	–	5
Wisconsin	3	–	5	5	–	7
Minnesota	2	–	6	4	–	7
Northwestern	2	–	6	4	–	7
$ – BCS representative as conference champion; Rankings from AP Poll

The 2001 Indiana Hoosiers football team represented Indiana University Bloomington during the 2001 NCAA Division I-A football season. They participated as members of the Big Ten Conference. The Hoosiers played their home games in Memorial Stadium at Bloomington, Indiana. The team was coached by Cam Cameron in his fifth and final year as head coach. Cameron was fired at the end of the season.

== Schedule ==
Date	Time	Opponent	Site	TV	Result	Attendance
September 6	6:30 pm	at NC State*	Carter–Finley Stadium; Raleigh, NC	ESPN	L 14–35	51,500
September 22	4:00 pm	Utah*	Memorial Stadium; Bloomington, IN		L 26–28	26,591
September 29	12:00 pm	Ohio State	Memorial Stadium; Bloomington, IN	ESPN Plus	L 14–27	48,577
October 6	1:00 pm	at Wisconsin	Camp Randall Stadium; Madison, WI		W 63–32	79,264
October 13	1:00 pm	Illinois^{†}	Memorial Stadium; Bloomington, IN (rivalry)		L 14–35	31,116
October 20	12:00 pm	at Iowa	Kinnick Stadium; Iowa City, IA	ESPN Plus	L 28–42	68,295
November 3	1:00 pm	Northwestern	Memorial Stadium; Bloomington, IN		W 56–21	26,213
November 10	12:00 pm	at No. 22 Michigan State	Spartan Stadium; East Lansing, MI (rivalry)		W 37–28	73,990
November 17	12:00 pm	at Penn State	Beaver Stadium; University Park, PA	ESPN Plus	L 14–28	106,527
November 24	12:00 pm	Purdue	Memorial Stadium; Bloomington, IN (Old Oaken Bucket)	ESPN Plus	W 13–7	36,685
December 1	1:00 pm	Kentucky*	Memorial Stadium; Bloomington, IN (rivalry)		W 26–15	26,449
*Non-conference game; ^{†}Homecoming; Rankings from AP Poll released prior to the game; All times are in Eastern time

== Roster ==
2001 Indiana Hoosiers football team roster
Players
Coaches
Offense

Pos.	#	Name	Class
G	70	Enoch DeMar	Jr
QB	17	Gibran Hamdan	Jr
QB	14	Tommy Jones	Jr
QB	11	Antwaan Randle El	Sr

Defense

Pos.	#	Name	Class
DT	92	Kemp Rasmussen	Sr
S	28	Buster Larkins	Fr

Special teams

Pos.	#	Name	Class

Head coach

- Cam Cameron

Coordinators/assistant coaches

Legend

- (C) Team captain
- (S) Suspended
- (I) Ineligible
- Injured
- Redshirt

== Game summaries ==
=== Iowa ===
Indiana at Iowa

Team	1	2	3	4	Total
Hoosiers	7	14	0	7	28
• Hawkeyes	21	7	7	7	42

- Date: October 20
- Location: Kinnick Stadium, Iowa City, IA
- Game start: 11:00 AM CST
- Game attendance: 68,295
- TV announcers (ESPN+): Wayne Larrivee, Randy Wright, and Jim Barbar

Scoring summary
1	13:15	IOWA	Kahlil Hill 75-yard pass from Kyle McCann (Kaeding kick)	Iowa 7–0
1	6:54	Indiana	Levron Williams 2-yard run (Braucher kick)	Tied 7–7
1	2:27	IOWA	Aaron Greving 9-yard run (Kaeding kick)	Iowa 14–7
1	0:29	IOWA	C.J. Jones 59-yard pass from Kyle McCann (Kaeding kick)	Iowa 21–7
2	8:33	Indiana	Antwaan Randle El 1-yard run (Braucher kick)	Iowa 21–14
2	6:11	IOWA	Aaron Greving 9-yard run (Kaeding kick)	Iowa 28–14
2	1:45	Indiana	Levron Williams 5-yard run (Braucher kick)	Iowa 28–21
3	6:30	IOWA	Ladell Betts 5-yard run (Kaeding kick)	Iowa 35–21
4	11:35	Indiana	Antwaan Randle El 6-yard run (Braucher kick)	Iowa 35–28
4	7:31	IOWA	Kahlil Hill 13-yard pass from Kyle McCann (Kaeding kick)	Iowa 42–28

== Player stats ==
Player	Comp	Attempts	Yards	TD	INT	Rating
Antwaan Randle El	118	231	1664	9	5	120.1
Tommy Jones	18	31	163	1	0	112.9
Gibran Hamdan	1	1	-3	0	0	N/A

== Awards and honors ==
- Antwaan Randle El, Big Ten Offensive Player of the Year
- Antwaan Randle El, Chicago Tribune Silver Football

== 2002 NFL draftees ==
Player	Position	Round	Pick	NFL club
Antwaan Randle El	Quarterback	2	62	Pittsburgh Steelers
