= 2008 Indiana Hoosiers football team =

American college football season

2008 Indiana Hoosiers football
- Conference: Big Ten Conference
- Record: 3–9 (1–7 Big Ten)
- Head coach: Bill Lynch (2nd season)
- Offensive coordinator: Matt Canada (2nd season)
- Co-defensive coordinators: Brian George (4th season); Joe Palcic (4th season)
- MVP: Jammie Kirlew
- Captains: Will Patterson; Christopher Phillips; Marcus Thigpen
- Home stadium: Memorial Stadium

2008 Big Ten Conference football standings
	Conf.			Overall
Team	W		L	W		L
No. 8 Penn State $+	7	–	1	11	–	2
No. 9 Ohio State %+	7	–	1	10	–	3
No. 24 Michigan State	6	–	2	9	–	4
Northwestern	5	–	3	9	–	4
No. 20 Iowa	5	–	3	9	–	4
Wisconsin	3	–	5	7	–	6
Minnesota	3	–	5	7	–	6
Illinois	3	–	5	5	–	7
Purdue	2	–	6	4	–	8
Michigan	2	–	6	3	–	9
Indiana	1	–	7	3	–	9
$ – BCS representative as conference champion; % – BCS at-large representative; + – Conference co-champions; Rankings from AP Poll

The 2008 Indiana Hoosiers football team represented the Indiana University Bloomington during the 2008 NCAA Division I FBS football season. The Hoosiers played their home games at Memorial Stadium in Bloomington, Indiana. The team was led by Bill Lynch in his second year, as head coach.

== Schedule ==
Date	Time	Opponent	Site	TV	Result	Attendance
August 30	12:00 pm	Western Kentucky*	Memorial Stadium; Bloomington, IN	BTN	W 31–13	30,067
September 6	7:00 pm	Murray State*	Memorial Stadium; Bloomington, IN	BTN	W 45–3	30,123
September 20	7:00 pm	Ball State*	Memorial Stadium; Bloomington, IN	BTN	L 20–42	41,349
September 27	12:00 pm	Michigan State	Memorial Stadium; Bloomington, IN (rivalry)	ESPN	L 29–42	31,832
October 4	12:00 pm	at Minnesota	Hubert H. Humphrey Metrodome; Minneapolis, MN	BTN	L 7–16	40,511
October 11	12:00 pm	Iowa	Memorial Stadium; Bloomington, IN	BTN	L 9–45	33,428
October 18	8:00 pm	at Illinois	Memorial Stadium; Champaign, IL (rivalry)	BTN	L 13–55	62,870
October 25	12:00 pm	Northwestern^{†}	Memorial Stadium; Bloomington, IN	BTN	W 21–19	30,698
November 1	12:00 pm	Central Michigan*	Memorial Stadium; Bloomington, IN	BTN	L 34–37	26,140
November 8	12:00 pm	Wisconsin	Memorial Stadium; Bloomington, IN	BTN	L 20–55	30,618
November 15	12:00 pm	at No. 7 Penn State	Beaver Stadium; University Park, PA	BTN	L 7–34	108,447
November 22	12:00 pm	at Purdue	Ross–Ade Stadium; West Lafayette, IN (Old Oaken Bucket)	ESPN2	L 10–62	63,107
*Non-conference game; ^{†}Homecoming; Rankings from Coaches Poll released prior to the game; All times are in Eastern time

== Game summaries ==
=== Western Kentucky ===
	1	2	3	4	Total
Hilltoppers	0	0	6	7	13
Hoosiers	10	7	7	7	31

=== Murray State ===
	1	2	3	4	Total
Racers	3	0	0	0	3
Hoosiers	14	10	21	0	45

=== Ball State ===
	1	2	3	4	Total
Cardinals	14	14	0	14	42
Hoosiers	6	14	0	0	20

=== Michigan State ===
	1	2	3	4	Total
Spartans	13	14	9	6	42
Hoosiers	7	15	7	0	29

=== Minnesota ===
	1	2	3	4	Total
Hoosiers	0	7	0	0	7
Golden Gophers	0	7	6	3	16

=== Iowa ===
	1	2	3	4	Total
Hawkeyes	10	7	14	14	45
Hoosiers	3	6	0	0	9

=== Illinois ===
	1	2	3	4	Total
Hoosiers	7	0	3	3	13
Fighting Illini	14	14	13	14	55

=== Northwestern ===
	1	2	3	4	Total
Wildcats	3	6	10	0	19
Hoosiers	7	7	7	0	21

=== Central Michigan ===
	1	2	3	4	Total
Chippewas	7	14	7	9	37
Hoosiers	14	7	13	0	34

=== Wisconsin ===
	1	2	3	4	Total
Badgers	14	10	17	14	55
Hoosiers	13	7	0	0	20

=== Penn State ===
	1	2	3	4	Total
Hoosiers	0	7	0	0	7
Nittany Lions	0	10	17	7	34

Penn State overcame a sluggish first half to preserve their perfect record over the Hoosiers. After going up 7–0, Indiana scored on the next drive to tie it at 7–7, but Kevin Kelly kicked a field goal right before halftime to give the Lions a 10–7 lead at halftime. In the third quarter, Penn State scored two more touchdowns and a field goal to put it at 27–7. Penn State scored the final touchdown of the game in the 4th quarter. Penn State's defense held the Hoosiers to six first downs and forced an interception. The offense struggled at times, however, and turned the ball over three times.

=== Purdue ===
	1	2	3	4	Total
Hoosiers	0	3	0	7	10
Boilermakers	24	17	14	7	62

== Rankings ==
Ranking movements
	Week															
Poll	Pre	1	2	3	4	5	6	7	8	9	10	11	12	13	14	Final
AP																
Coaches																
Harris	Not released															Not released
BCS	Not released															Not released

== Statistics ==
=== Team ===
	Team	Opp
Scoring	76	16
Points per game	38	8
First downs	50	24
Rushing	25	6
Passing	21	16
Penalty	4	2
Total offense	926	431
Avg per play	6.1	3.7
Avg per game	463	215.5
Fumbles-Lost	3 1	4 3
Penalties-Yards	7 63	7 86
Avg per game	31.5	43

	Team	Opp
Punts-Yards	7 272	15 610
Avg per punt	38.9	40.7
Time of possession/Game	30:14	29:46
3rd down conversions	8/25	9/29
4th down conversions	3/5	1/2
Touchdowns scored	10	1
Field goals-Attempts-Long	2 3 28	3 3 37
PAT-Attempts	10 10	1 1
Attendance	60,190	
Games/Avg per Game	30,095	

==== Scores by quarter ====
	1	2	3	4	Total
Indiana	24	17	28	7	76
Opponents	3	0	6	7	16

=== Offense ===
==== Rushing ====
Name	GP-GS	Att	Gain	Loss	Net	Avg	TD	Long	Avg/G
Marcus Thigpen		94			631	6.7	7	78	
Kellen Lewis		93			500	5.4	3	75	
Bryan Payton		79			339	4.3	2	34	
Demetrius McCray		59			214	3.6	2	31	
Zach Davis-Walker		23			106	4.6	1	18	
Ben Chappell		50			72	1.4	3	15	
Ray Fisher		10			58	5.8	0	22	
Trea Burgess		17			54	3.2	0	6	
Mitchell Evans		8			26	3.3	1	14	
Chris Hagerup		3			12	4.0	0	17	
Andrew Means		1			7	7.0	0	7	
Total									
Opponents									

==== Passing ====
Name	GP-GS	Effic	Att-Cmp-Int	Pct	Yds	TD	Lng	Avg/G
Kellen Lewis		108.2	193-110-8	57%	1131	6	79	
Ben Chappell		111.9	153-80-3	52.3%	1001	4	77	
Mitchell Evans		105.1	8-2-0	25%	37	1		
Teddy Schell		37.6	4-1-0	25%	6	0		
Total		108.4	358-193-12	53.9%	2175	11		
Opponents								

==== Receiving ====
Name	GP-GS	Rec	Yds	Avg	TD	Long	Avg/G
Andrew Means		34	450	13.2	1	47	
Ray Fisher		42	373	8.9	5	64	
Damarlo Belcher		25	337	13.5	2	47	
Terrance Turner		29	289	10.0	0	38	
Marcus Thigpen		13	235	18.1	2	79	
Tandon Doss		14	186	13.3	1	28	
Mitchell Evans		9	129	14.3	0	23	
Brandon Walker-Roby		7	54	7.7	0	26	
Max Dedmond		6	51	8.5	0	12	
Bryan Payton		2	23	11.5	0	14	
Matt Ernest		3	18	6.0	0	9	
Kellen Lewis		2	17	8.5	0	13	
Chris Banks		1	8	8.0	0	8	
Brad Martin		1	6	6.0	0	6	
Collin Taylor		1	3	3.0	0	3	
Total		193	2175	11.3	11	79	
Opponents							

=== Defense ===
Name	GP	Tackles				Sacks	Pass defense		Interceptions				Fumbles		Blkd Kick
Name	GP	Solo	Ast	Total	TFL-Yds	No-Yds	BrUp	QBH	No.-Yds	Avg	TD	Long	Rcv-Yds	FF	Blkd Kick
Total															

=== Special teams ===
Name	Punting								Kickoffs				
Name	No.	Yds	Avg	Long	TB	FC	I20	Blkd	No.	Yds	Avg	TB	OB
Total													

Name	Punt returns					Kick returns				
Name	No.	Yds	Avg	TD	Long	No.	Yds	Avg	TD	Long
Total										
