= 2000 Indiana Hoosiers football team =

American college football season

2000 Indiana Hoosiers football
- Conference: Big Ten Conference
- Record: 3–8 (2–6 Big Ten)
- Head coach: Cam Cameron (4th season)
- Offensive coordinator: Hal Hunter (1st season)
- Defensive coordinator: James Bell (1st season)
- MVP: Antwaan Randle El
- Captains: Versie Gaddis; Paul Mandina; Antwaan Randle El; Kemp Rasmussen
- Home stadium: Memorial Stadium

2000 Big Ten Conference football standings
	Conf.			Overall
Team	W		L	W		L
No. 11 Michigan +	6	–	2	9	–	3
Northwestern +	6	–	2	8	–	4
No. 13 Purdue $+	6	–	2	8	–	4
Ohio State	5	–	3	8	–	4
No. 23 Wisconsin	4	–	4	9	–	4
Minnesota	4	–	4	6	–	6
Penn State	4	–	4	5	–	7
Iowa	3	–	5	3	–	9
Illinois	2	–	6	5	–	6
Michigan State	2	–	6	5	–	6
Indiana	2	–	6	3	–	8
$ – BCS representative as conference champion; + – Conference co-champions; Rankings from AP Poll

The 2000 Indiana Hoosiers football team represented Indiana University Bloomington during the 2000 NCAA Division I-A football season. They participated as members of the Big Ten Conference. The Hoosiers played their home games at Memorial Stadium in Bloomington, Indiana. The team was coached by Cam Cameron in his fourth year as head coach.

== Schedule ==
Date	Time	Opponent	Site	TV	Result	Attendance	Source
September 9	12:00 pm	NC State*	Memorial Stadium; Bloomington, IN	ESPN2	L 38–41	30,151	
September 16	6:00 pm	at Kentucky*	Commonwealth Stadium; Lexington, KY (rivalry)	ESPN2	L 34–41	70,776	
September 23	1:00 pm	Cincinnati*	Memorial Stadium; Bloomington, IN		W 42–6	30,075	
September 30	12:00 pm	Iowa	Memorial Stadium; Bloomington, IN	ESPN Plus	W 45–33	31,225	
October 7	12:00 pm	at No. 22 Northwestern	Ryan Field; Evanston, IL	ESPN Plus	L 33–52	30,201	
October 14	3:30 pm	at No. 18 Michigan	Michigan Stadium; Ann Arbor, MI	ABC	L 0–58	110,909	
October 21	1:00 pm	No. 22 Minnesota^{†}	Memorial Stadium; Bloomington, IN		W 51–43	30,882	
October 28	7:00 pm	vs Penn State	RCA Dome; Indianapolis, IN	ESPN2	L 24–27	43,122	
November 4	12:00 pm	at Illinois	Memorial Stadium; Champaign, IL (rivalry)	ESPN+	L 35–42	54,283	
November 11	12:00 pm	Wisconsin	Memorial Stadium; Bloomington, IN	ESPN+	L 22–43	30,469	
November 18	3:30 pm	at No. 17 Purdue	Ross–Ade Stadium; West Lafayette, IN (Old Oaken Bucket)	ABC	L 13–41	69,104	
*Non-conference game; ^{†}Homecoming; Rankings from AP Poll released prior to the game; All times are in Eastern time

== Roster ==
2000 Indiana Hoosiers football team roster
Players
Coaches
Offense

Pos.	#	Name	Class
G	70	Enoch DeMar	So
QB	17	Gibran Hamdan	So
QB	14	Tommy Jones	So
QB	11	Antwaan Randle El	Jr

Defense

Pos.	#	Name	Class
DT	92	Kemp Nigher	Jr

Special teams

Pos.	#	Name	Class

Head coach

- Cam Cameron

Coordinators/assistant coaches

Legend

- (C) Team captain
- (S) Suspended
- (I) Ineligible
- Injured
- Redshirt
