= Tre Roberson =

American gridiron football player (born 1992)

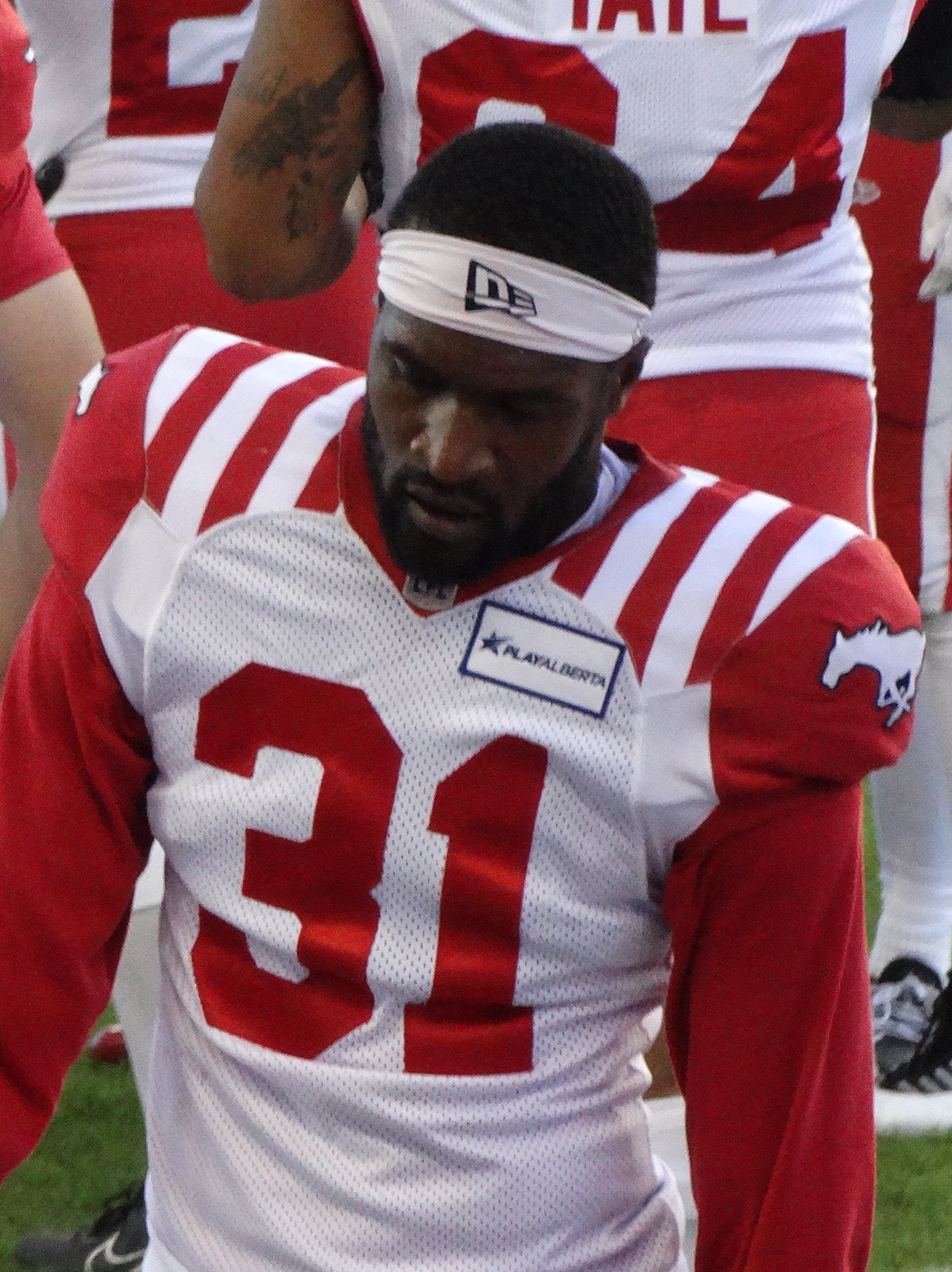
- Roberson with the Calgary Stampeders in 2024

Profile
- Position: Defensive back

Personal information
- Born: October 22, 1992 (age 34); Indianapolis, Indiana, U.S.
- Listed height: 6 ft 0 in (1.83 m)
- Listed weight: 196 lb (89 kg)

Career information
- High school: Lawrence Central (Indianapolis)
- College: Indiana (2011–2013); Illinois State (2014–2015)
- NFL draft: 2016: undrafted

Career history
- Minnesota Vikings (2016)*; Calgary Stampeders (2018–2019); Chicago Bears (2020); Calgary Stampeders (2021–2024)
- * Offseason or practice squad member only

Awards and highlights
- Grey Cup champion (2018); CFL All-Star (2019); CFL West All-Star (2019)
- Stats at Pro Football Reference
- Stats at CFL.ca

Trerein "Tre" E. Roberson (born October 22, 1992) is an American professional football defensive back. He was signed by the Minnesota Vikings as an undrafted free agent following the 2016 NFL draft. He then played for the Calgary Stampeders of the Canadian Football League (CFL) until he signed with the Chicago Bears in 2020. Prior to entering the NFL, Roberson played college football as a quarterback for the Indiana Hoosiers and the Illinois State Redbirds. Roberson had a 3–4 record for his career as the starting quarterback at Indiana and a 23–5 record for Illinois State.

Roberson played high school football at Lawrence Central High School, where he was a two-sport athlete, and won the 2010 Indiana Mr. Football. He committed to Indiana University on April 10, 2010, and became the first ever true freshman to start at quarterback for the Hoosiers. In June 2014, Roberson announced his intentions to leave Indiana and transfer to Illinois State University of the FCS.

== Early life ==
Roberson was born on October 22, 1992, to Gajuan Roberson and Monica Highbaugh. He began his high school career as a student at North Central High School, where he was a member of the basketball team. After his freshman year, he transferred to Lawrence Central High School in Indianapolis, Indiana, where he was a member of the football (coached by Jayson West) and basketball (coached by J.R. Shelt) teams. In his first football season with Lawrence Central, he was thrust into the starting quarterback role in just the second game of the season after the regular starter left the game with an injury. With his team trailing 14–0, and playing North Central, Roberson went on to lead the team to a 28–16 second half victory. Roberson went on to be the starter for the next 3 years leading his team to a 13–2 record and an appearance in the Indiana Class 5-A football state championship game his senior season, losing 38–19 to Fishers High School. With outstanding numbers during his senior season, which saw him complete 144 passes on 237 attempts for 2,611 yards, 24 touchdowns and four interceptions, while also running for 1,950 rushing yards and 21 scores, Roberson was named the 2010 Indiana Mr. Football. He received 19 of 50 first place votes from the Indiana Football Coaches Association. Roberson beat out Fishers High School quarterback/defensive back Koby Orris, who led his team to the 5A title over Roberson's Lawrence Central team, was second with 13 votes. He was also named to the Associated Press All-State football team 2010.

Roberson committed to Indiana University Bloomington on April 10, 2010. Roberson was offered football scholarships by Purdue and Toledo, while also gaining interest from Oregon, Illinois and Ball State, but he quickly signed with the Hoosiers after they offered him a scholarship. On November 28, 2010, Indiana fired their head coach Bill Lynch, who had recruited Roberson. On December 7, the Hoosiers announced that they had hired Oklahoma's offensive coordinator, Kevin Wilson, as their new head coach. Wilson made it clear that he wanted to keep most of the players that had committed to Lynch's staff, and Roberson did not change his mind about coming to Indiana and signed with the Hoosiers on National Signing Day.

College recruiting
Name	Hometown	School	Height	Weight	40^{‡}	Commit date
Tre Roberson; QB	Indianapolis, Indiana	Lawrence Central High School	6 ft 1 in (1.85 m)	170 lb (77 kg)	–	Apr 10, 2007
Tre Roberson; QB	Recruit ratings: Scout: Rivals:					
Overall recruit ranking: Scout: 172 (WR) Rivals: 28 (QB), 11 (IN)
‡ Refers to 40-yard dash; Note: In many cases, Scout, Rivals, 247Sports, On3, and ESPN may conflict in their listings of height, weight and 40 time.; In these cases, the average was taken. ESPN grades are on a 100-point scale.; Sources: "2010 Team Ranking". Rivals.com.

== College career ==
=== Indiana ===
==== 2011 ====
Roberson arrived on the Indiana University Bloomington campus on the summer of 2011, and was one of five candidates to replace starter Ben Chappell, who had graduated. Within a few weeks it was between Roberson, Edward Wright-Baker and Dusty Kiel for the starting spot, and come September 3, Wright-Baker was named the team's starter with Roberson as the 3rd stringer. For the five games of the season, Roberson appeared in two games where he was used a wildcat quarterback running for 7 yards on 3 carries. During an October 10 game against Illinois, Roberson came in after Dusty Kiel proved to be ineffective. Completing 11 of 17 passes for 148 yards while throwing an interception. His play was impressive enough to cause a stir amongst the media, but with the Hoosiers next game being at No. 4 Wisconsin, it was decided that Wright-Baker would again start for the Hoosiers. The Hoosiers lost 59–7 against the Badgers with Roberson seeing playing time in relief of Wright-Baker. He completed two passes on just five attempts for 10 yards. On Friday, November 21, the Hoosier program learned that top recruit, Gunner Kiel, had decommitted from the program, and would explore other options. Without Gunner's commitment, the Hoosiers seemed to place their future in Roberson's hands. The following day Roberson was named the Hoosiers starting quarterback against the Iowa Hawkeyes. With his first snap, he became the first true freshman to start at quarterback for the Hoosiers in program history. In the game, he completed 16-of-24 passes for 196 yards and a touchdown. He also rushed the ball 15 times for 82 yards. For his efforts, he was named the Big Ten freshman of the week.

==== 2012 ====
The Hoosiers began their 2012 campaign at home against Indiana State. Roberson had one rushing touchdown and completed 26 passes for 280 yards including a 71 yard touchdown strike to wide receiver Shane Wynn. Indiana won the game 24–17. Against Massachusetts, Roberson broke his left leg and missed the remainder of the season. Prior to his injury, he had rushed for 114 yards with two touchdowns and had completed 7 of 14 passes for 88 yards with one touchdown and one interception during the game. During his absence, Indiana's record was 2–8. He was replaced by Cameron Coffman and Nathan Sudfeld. Because Roberson was injured so early on in the season, he was granted a medical redshirt, so he would still have three years of eligibility remaining.

==== 2013 ====
Roberson entered the 2013 Spring Game as the starting quarterback. Throughout the first few weeks of the season, Roberson and Nate Sudfeld switched off with the quarterbacking duties. In the opening win against Indiana State, Roberson started the game and threw two touchdowns and 71 yards through the air before Sudfeld was subbed in. He appeared briefly in the second game against Navy in which the Hoosiers would lose, and rushed for a touchdown in the third game, a win against the Bowling Green Falcons. In the fourth game of the season against the Missouri Tigers, Roberson entered the game in the third quarter and completed 8 of 14 passes for 148 yards, a touchdown through the air and another on the ground. Indiana lost the game 45–28. Throughout the remainder of the season, Roberson appeared on and off until the final game of the season against the Purdue Boilermakers. In that game, Roberson threw for 273 and 6 touchdown passes, and led IU to a 56–36 victory over their arch rivals.

=== Illinois State ===
==== 2014 ====
After finishing spring practice in Bloomington, it was expected that Roberson would continue to split snaps with teammate Nate Sudfeld in the upcoming season. However, on June 11, Roberson announced his decision to transfer from Indiana. In doing so, he became the second former starting QB to leave the team in offseason after Cam Coffman's transfer to Wyoming. Just two days later, Roberson tweeted that he would be transferring to Illinois State University in Normal, Illinois, to join head coach Brock Spack and the Redbirds. Because ISU is an FCS school, Roberson was eligible to play immediately as a redshirt junior with two years of NCAA eligibility remaining. After winning the job for starting quarterback, Roberson began the 2014 campaign with a 62–0 blowout victory over Mississippi Valley State. In the game, he passed for 204 yards and two touchdowns, rushed for 41 yards and two touchdowns, and was finally rested for backup Blake Winkler. Roberson and fellow teammate running back Marshaun Coprich would lead the team to a 13–2 record on the season, making it all the way to the division championship before losing 29–27 to North Dakota State.

==== 2015 ====
The Redbirds opened up the 2015 season against the Iowa Hawkeyes at Kinnick Stadium. After much hype for the new season, Illinois State was defeated by a score of 31–14. Roberson completed just 5 of 12 passes for 49 yards before leaving the game due to cramps and being replaced by Jake Kolbe. The Redbirds would rebound the following two weeks, defeating Morgan State 67–14 and Eastern Illinois 34–31. The Redbirds finished the regular season with a record of 9–2, and then advanced to the NCAA Division I FCS Playoffs. After defeating Western Illinois by a score of 36–19, they would go on to lose to Richmond by a score of 39–27 and ending their season with a 10–3 record. Roberson finished with 18 touchdown passes to 9 interceptions on the season and adding 11 more scores on the ground.

== Professional career ==
=== Pre-draft ===
Due to eligibility constraints, Roberson's collegiate career ended after January 2016. Although he was eligible for the NFL draft, he was not invited to the combine and was not expected to be drafted.

Pre-draft measurables
Height	Weight	Arm length	Hand span	40-yard dash	10-yard split	20-yard split	20-yard shuttle	Three-cone drill	Vertical jump	Broad jump	Bench press
5 ft 11 7/8 in (1.83 m)	196 lb (89 kg)	31 7/8 in (0.81 m)	9 3/8 in (0.24 m)	4.52 s	1.47 s	2.54 s	4.20 s	6.79 s	37.5 in (0.95 m)	10 ft 1 in (3.07 m)	14 reps
All values from Illinois State's Pro Day

=== Minnesota Vikings ===
After switching to cornerback, Roberson worked out at Illinois State's Pro Day and was offered a tryout by the Minnesota Vikings after the 2016 NFL draft. On May 9, 2016, it was announced that Roberson had signed a contract with the Minnesota Vikings. Despite a strong performance in the preseason, he was released by the Vikings as part of final roster cuts on September 3, 2016. Shortly afterwards, Roberson was signed to the team's practice squad. On September 6, 2016, he was released from the Vikings' practice squad. On September 13, he was re-signed to their practice squad. He was released on October 5, 2016, and re-signed again on October 18. He signed a reserve/futures contract with the Vikings on January 2, 2017.

On September 2, 2017, Roberson was waived by the Vikings.

=== Calgary Stampeders (first stint) ===
Roberson signed with the Calgary Stampeders in May 2018. He played in his first career professional game on June 16, 2018, against the Hamilton Tiger-Cats. He played in 16 regular season games and two post-season games in 2018 and won his first Grey Cup championship as a member of the 106th Grey Cup winning team.

=== Chicago Bears ===
On January 28, 2020, Roberson signed the largest CFL to NFL deal with the Chicago Bears since Cameron Wake signed a four-year contract worth up to $4.9 million with the Miami Dolphins. He was waived with a non-football injury designation by the team on July 28; he had broken his foot while training during the offseason. He was placed on the reserve/non-football injury list after clearing waivers the next day.

On August 31, 2021, Roberson was waived/injured by the Bears and placed on injured reserve. He was released on September 6.

=== Calgary Stampeders (second stint) ===
On October 19, 2021, it was announced that Roberson had re-signed with the Stampeders. After joining the Stamps midway through the season Roberson played in only three games in the regular season. He made nine tackles and created a forced fumble. Following the season, on December 14, 2021, Roberson and the Stampeders announced they had agreed to a contract extension through the 2023 season. In the following season, Roberson played in five games for the Stamps before suffering a knee injury which would cause him to miss the remainder of the season. In those five games, Roberson contributed with 17 defensive tackles, one interception and one forced fumble.

In the 2023 season, Roberson played in 16 games where he recorded 51 defensive tackles and two interceptions. He played in 17 games in 2024, where he had 43 defensive tackles and four interceptions, including one returned for a touchdown. He became a free agent upon the expiry of his contract on February 11, 2025.

== Career statistics ==
College statistics
Year	Team	Passing							Rushing			
Year	Team	Cmp	Att	Yds	Pct	TD	Int	Rtg	Att	Yds	Avg	TD
2011	Indiana	81	142	937	57.0	3	6	111.0	109	426	3.9	2
2012	Indiana	33	50	368	66.0	2	1	137.0	12	133	11.1	3
2013	Indiana	83	138	1,128	60.1	15	4	158.9	85	423	5.0	5
2014	Illinois State	208	359	3,221	55.1	30	10	155.3	171	1,029	6.0	11
2015	Illinois State	119	243	2,225	49.0	18	9	171.2	123	777	6.3	11
Career		524	932	7,879	56.2	68	30	120.5	500	2,788	5.6	32

== Personal life ==
Roberson is the grandson of Larry Highbaugh, who spent 13 years in the Canadian Football League and is a member of the Canadian Football Hall of Fame.
