= 1998 Indiana Hoosiers football team =

American college football season

1998 Indiana Hoosiers football
- Conference: Big Ten Conference
- Record: 4–7 (2–6 Big Ten)
- Head coach: Cam Cameron (2nd season)
- Offensive coordinator: Pete Schmidt (2nd season)
- Offensive scheme: Pro-style
- Defensive coordinator: Jon Heacock (2nd season)
- Base defense: 46 flex
- MVPs: Chris Gall; Jabar Robinson
- Captains: Chris Gall; Jabar Robinson
- Home stadium: Memorial Stadium

1998 Big Ten Conference football standings
	Conf.			Overall
Team	W		L	W		L
No. 2 Ohio State %+	7	–	1	11	–	1
No. 6 Wisconsin $+	7	–	1	11	–	1
No. 12 Michigan +	7	–	1	10	–	3
No. 24 Purdue	6	–	2	9	–	4
No. 17 Penn State	5	–	3	9	–	3
Michigan State	4	–	4	6	–	6
Minnesota	2	–	6	5	–	6
Indiana	2	–	6	4	–	7
Illinois	2	–	6	3	–	8
Iowa	2	–	6	3	–	8
Northwestern	0	–	8	3	–	9
$ – BCS representative as conference champion; % – BCS at-large representative; + – Conference co-champions; Rankings from AP Poll

The 1998 Indiana Hoosiers football team represented Indiana University Bloomington during the 1998 NCAA Division I-A football season. They participated as members of the Big Ten Conference. The Hoosiers played their home games in Memorial Stadium in Bloomington, Indiana. The team was coached by Cam Cameron in his second year as head coach.

== Schedule ==
Date	Time	Opponent	Site	TV	Result	Attendance	Source
September 12	6:00 pm	Western Michigan*	Memorial Stadium; Bloomington, IN		W 45–30	31,238	
September 19	1:30 pm	at Kentucky*	Commonwealth Stadium; Lexington, KY (rivalry)		L 27–31	57,788	
September 26	6:00 pm	at Cincinnati*	Nippert Stadium; Cincinnati, OH		W 48–14	32,117	
October 3	12:00 pm	No. 13 Wisconsin	Memorial Stadium; Bloomington, IN	ESPN Plus	L 20–24	32,328	
October 10	12:00 pm	at Michigan State	Spartan Stadium; East Lansing, MI (rivalry)	ESPN	L 31–38 ^{2OT}	73,425	
October 17	12:00 pm	Iowa^{†}	Memorial Stadium; Bloomington, IN	ESPN Plus	W 14–7	36,598	
October 24	12:00 pm	at Michigan	Michigan Stadium; Ann Arbor, MI	ESPN	L 10–21	110,863	
October 31	3:30 pm	No. 1 Ohio State	Memorial Stadium; Bloomington, IN	ABC	L 7–38	52,049	
November 7	2:00 pm	at Illinois	Memorial Stadium; Champaign, IL (rivalry)		L 16–31	31,388	
November 14	12:00 pm	Minnesota	Memorial Stadium; Bloomington, IN	FSN	W 20–19	30,049	
November 21	1:00 pm	at Purdue	Ross–Ade Stadium; West Lafayette, IN (Old Oaken Bucket)		L 7–52	68,512	
*Non-conference game; ^{†}Homecoming; Rankings from AP Poll released prior to the game; All times are in Eastern time

== Roster ==
1998 Indiana Hoosiers football team roster
Players
Coaches
Offense

Pos.	#	Name	Class
FB	40	Chris Gall	Sr
QB	7	Earl Haniford	So
QB	11	Antwaan Randle El	Fr
C, G	65	Matt Snyder	Jr
WR	5	Levron Williams	So

Defense

Pos.	#	Name	Class
LB	94	Tony Brown	So
DE	93	Adewale Ogunleye	Jr
DB	10	Curtis Randle El	Jr
DE	92	Kemp Rasmussen	Fr
LB	52	Mike Scaletta	Fr

Special teams

Pos.	#	Name	Class

Head coach

- Cam Cameron

Coordinators/assistant coaches

Legend

- (C) Team captain
- (S) Suspended
- (I) Ineligible
- Injured
- Redshirt

Roster
