= 2021 Outback Bowl =

Postseason college football bowl game

- 35th Outback Bowl
Ole Miss Rebels	Indiana Hoosiers
(4–5)	(6–1)
SEC	Big Ten
26	20
Head coach: Lane Kiffin	Head coach: Tom Allen
	AP / Coaches / CFP; 7 / 8 / 11
	1	2	3	4	Total
Ole Miss	6	7	7	6	26
Indiana	3	0	3	14	20
- Date: January 2, 2021
- Season: 2020
- Stadium: Raymond James Stadium
- Location: Tampa, Florida
- MVP: Matt Corral (QB, Ole Miss)
- Favorite: Indiana by 8
- Referee: Gary Patterson (ACC)
- Attendance: 11,025

United States TV coverage
- Network: ABC
- Announcers: Tom Hart (play-by-play); Jordan Rodgers (analyst); Cole Cubelic (sideline)

The 2021 Outback Bowl was a college football bowl game played on January 2, 2021, with kickoff at 12:30 p.m. EST on ABC. It was the 35th edition of the Outback Bowl, and was one of the 2020–21 bowl games concluding the 2020 FBS football season. The game was named after its title sponsor, Outback Steakhouse.

== Teams ==
The game matched the Indiana Hoosiers from the Big Ten Conference and the Ole Miss Rebels from the Southeastern Conference (SEC). This was the first meeting between the programs.

=== Ole Miss Rebels ===
Ole Miss entered the game with a 4–5 record in an SEC-only schedule. They finished in fifth place in the SEC's Western Division. The Rebels were 0–2 against ranked opponents, losing to eventual national champions Alabama and SEC Eastern Division champions Florida. They had wins against Kentucky, Vanderbilt, South Carolina and Mississippi State. This was Ole Miss's first appearance in the Outback Bowl. They were one of a limited number of teams to enter a bowl game with a losing record.

=== Indiana Hoosiers ===
Indiana entered the game with a 6–1 record in a Big Ten-only schedule. They finished in second place in the Big Ten's East Division. The Hoosiers were 3–1 against ranked opponents, defeating Penn State, Michigan, and Wisconsin while losing to Big Ten champions Ohio State. This was Indiana's first appearance in the Outback Bowl.

== Game summary ==
2021 Outback Bowl

Quarter	1	2	3	4	Total
Ole Miss	6	7	7	6	26
No. 11 Indiana	3	0	3	14	20

at Raymond James Stadium • Tampa, Florida

- Date: Friday, January 2, 2021
- Game time: 12:30 p.m. EST
- Game weather: Partly cloudy • Temperature: 78 °F (26 °C) • Wind: SW 14 mph
- Referee: Gary Patterson (ACC)
- TV announcers (ABC): Tom Hart (play-by-play), Jordan Rodgers (analyst), and Cole Cubelic (sideline)
- ESPN game summary

Game information

First quarter

- (12:56) MISS – Luke Logan 26 yard field goal (Drive: 7 plays, 57 yards, 2:04; Ole Miss 3–0)
- (2:47) IND – Charles Campbell 50 yard field goal (Drive: 11 plays, 49 yards, 6:07; Tied 3–3)
- (0:23) MISS – Luke Logan 24 yard field goal (Drive: 13 plays, 68 yards, 2:24; Ole Miss 6–3)

Second quarter

- (7:17) MISS – Casey Kelly 5 yard pass from Matt Corral, Luke Logan kick (Drive: 18 plays, 76 yards, 6:00; Ole Miss 13–3)

Third quarter

- (12:53) IND – Charles Campbell 53 yard field goal (Drive: 8 plays, 40 yards, 2:07; Ole Miss 13–6)
- (9:20) MISS – Snoop Conner 4 yard rush, Luke Logan kick (Drive: 12 plays, 87 yards, 3:33; Ole Miss 20–6)

Fourth quarter

- (14:56) IND – Stevie Scott 3 yard rush, Charles Campbell kick (Drive: 15 plays, 80 yards, 6:45; Ole Miss 20–13)
- (5:58) IND – Stevie Scott 2 yard rush, Charles Campbell kick (Drive: 12 plays, 80 yards, 5:40; Tied 20–20)
- (4:12) MISS – Dontario Drummond 3 yard pass from Matt Corral, kick failed (Drive: 6 plays, 63 yards, 1:46; Ole Miss 26–20)

=== Statistics ===
Statistics	MISS	IND
First downs	27	26
Plays–yards	80–493	85–369
Rushes–yards	35–147	40–168
Passing yards	346	201
Passing: comp–att–int	31–45–0	26–45–1
Time of possession	24:19	35:41

Team	Category	Player	Statistics
Ole Miss	Passing	Matt Corral	30/44, 342 yards, 2 TD
Ole Miss	Rushing	Henry Parrish	17 carries, 63 yards
Ole Miss	Receiving	Dontario Drummond	6 receptions, 110 yards, 1 TD
Indiana	Passing	Jack Tuttle	26/45, 201 yards, 1 INT
Indiana	Rushing	Stevie Scott	19 carries, 99 yards, 2 TD
Indiana	Receiving	Whop Philyor	18 receptions, 81 yards
