= 1998 Illinois Fighting Illini football team =

American college football season

1998 Illinois Fighting Illini football
- Conference: Big Ten Conference
- Record: 3–8 (2–6 Big Ten)
- Head coach: Ron Turner (2nd season)
- Offensive coordinator: Buddy Teevens (2nd season)
- Offensive scheme: Pro-style
- Defensive coordinator: Tim Kish (2nd season)
- Base defense: 4–3
- MVP: Danny Clark
- Captains: Ivan Benson; Danny Clark; Ryan Schau
- Home stadium: Memorial Stadium

1998 Big Ten Conference football standings
	Conf.			Overall
Team	W		L	W		L
No. 2 Ohio State %+	7	–	1	11	–	1
No. 6 Wisconsin $+	7	–	1	11	–	1
No. 12 Michigan +	7	–	1	10	–	3
No. 24 Purdue	6	–	2	9	–	4
No. 17 Penn State	5	–	3	9	–	3
Michigan State	4	–	4	6	–	6
Minnesota	2	–	6	5	–	6
Indiana	2	–	6	4	–	7
Illinois	2	–	6	3	–	8
Iowa	2	–	6	3	–	8
Northwestern	0	–	8	3	–	9
$ – BCS representative as conference champion; % – BCS at-large representative; + – Conference co-champions; Rankings from AP Poll

The 1998 Illinois Fighting Illini football team was an American football team that represented the University of Illinois at Urbana-Champaign as a member of the Big Ten Conference during the 1998 NCAA Division I-A football season. In their second year under head coach Ron Turner, the Fighting Illini compiled a 3–8 record (2–6 in conference games), finished in a four-way tie for seventh place in the Big Ten, and were outscored by a total of 326 to 149.

The team's statistical leaders included quarterback Kurt Kittner (782 passing yards), running back Rocky Harvey (634 rushing yards), and wide receiver Lenny Willis (26 receptions for 301 yards).

The team played its home games at Memorial Stadium in Champaign, Illinois.

== Schedule ==
Date	Time	Opponent	Site	TV	Result	Attendance	Source
September 5	5:30 pm	at Washington State*	Martin Stadium; Pullman, WA	FSN	L 13–20	31,568	
September 12	6:00 pm	Middle Tennessee*	Memorial Stadium; Champaign, IL		W 48–20	35,475	
September 19	11:00 am	Louisville*	Memorial Stadium; Champaign, IL	ESPN2	L 9–35	39,475	
September 26	11:00 am	Iowa	Memorial Stadium; Champaign, IL	ESPN Plus	L 14–37	44,245	
October 3	11:00 am	at Northwestern	Ryan Field; Evanston, IL (rivalry)	ESPN Plus	W 13–10	41,232	
October 10	11:00 am	No. 1 Ohio State	Memorial Stadium; Champaign, IL (Illibuck)	ESPN	L 0–41	46,390	
October 17	11:00 am	No. 9 Wisconsin	Memorial Stadium; Champaign, IL	ESPN2	L 3–37	40,627	
October 24	1:00 pm	at Purdue	Ross–Ade Stadium; West Lafayette, IN (rivalry)		L 9–42	60,163	
October 31	11:00 am	at No. 10 Penn State	Beaver Stadium; University Park, PA	ESPN Plus	L 0–27	96,508	
November 7	1:00 pm	Indiana	Memorial Stadium; Champaign, IL (rivalry)		W 31–16	31,388	
November 21	12:00 pm	at Michigan State	Spartan Stadium; East Lansing, MI		L 9–31	67,285	
*Non-conference game; Rankings from AP Poll released prior to the game; All times are in Central time

== Roster ==
1998 Illinois Fighting Illini football team roster
Players
Coaches
Offense

Pos.	#	Name	Class
RB	34	Jameel Cook	Fr
QB	15	Kurt Kittner	Fr
WR	12	William Loyd	Jr
OL	67	J. P. Machado	Sr
WR	22	Rob Majoy	Sr
WR	6	George McDonald-Ashford	Sr
OL	60	Ryan Schau	Sr
OL	62	Tom Schau	Sr
OL	76	Brian Scott	Jr
WR	16	Roy Sessions	So
OT	59	Marques Sullivan	So
TE	87	Josh Whitman	So

Defense

Pos.	#	Name	Class
LB	48	Danny Clark	Jr
LB	57	Marcus Hood	So
CB	43	Anthony Hurd	Fr
S	2	Bobby Jackson	So
DT	66	Garrett Johnson	Sr
DE	56	Ryan Murphy	Sr
S	18	Nolan Nawrocki	Jr
DE	99	Fred Wakefield	So

Special teams

Pos.	#	Name	Class
LS	51	Nathan Hodel	So
K	98	Neil Rackers	Jr

Head coach

- Ron Turner

Coordinators/assistant coaches

Legend

- (C) Team captain
- (S) Suspended
- (I) Ineligible
- Injured
- Redshirt

Roster
