= Adam Haayer =

American football player (born 1977)

No. 72, 64
- Position: Offensive tackle

Personal information
- Born: February 22, 1977 (age 49); Wyoming, Minnesota, U.S.
- Listed height: 6 ft 6 in (1.98 m)
- Listed weight: 308 lb (140 kg)

Career information
- College: Minnesota
- NFL draft: 2001: 6th round, 199th overall pick

Career history
- Tennessee Titans (2001); Minnesota Vikings (2002–2004); Arizona Cardinals (2005); St. Louis Rams (2006)

Career NFL statistics
- Games played: 20
- Games started: 5
- Fumble recoveries: 1
- Stats at Pro Football Reference

Adam John Haayer (born February 22, 1977) is an American former professional football player who was an offensive tackle in the National Football League (NFL). He played college football for the Minnesota Golden Gophers and was selected by the Tennessee Titans in the sixth round of the 2001 NFL draft.

Haayer also played for the Minnesota Vikings, Arizona Cardinals, and St. Louis Rams.
