= Ben Chappell =

American football player (born 1987)

No. 4 (Indiana)
- Position: Quarterback

Personal information
- Born: June 2, 1987 (age 39)
- Listed height: 6 ft 3 in (1.91 m)
- Listed weight: 242 lb (110 kg)

Career information
- High school: South (Bloomington, Indiana)
- College: Indiana (2006–2010)
- NFL draft: 2011: undrafted

Career history
- Washington Redskins (2011)*
- * Offseason or practice squad member only
- Stats at Pro Football Reference

Benjamin Scott Chappell (born June 2, 1987) is an American former college football quarterback who played for the Indiana Hoosiers from 2007 to 2010. He began his career as the backup to Kellen Lewis and became the starter after Lewis was dismissed from the team. Chappell ended his college career with school career records in completions (651), passing attempts (1,066), and completion percentage (61.1) while finishing second in passing yards (7,251) and passing touchdowns (45). He played for the Washington Redskins during the 2011 NFL preseason.

== Early life ==
Benjamin Scott Chappell was born on June 2, 1987. He played high school football at Bloomington High School South in Bloomington, Indiana. He threw for 2,359 yards and 27 touchdowns his senior year, earning Associated Press first-team All-State honors. He was also a four-year letterman in basketball.

== College career ==
Chappell enrolled at Indiana University Bloomington to play college football for the Hoosiers. He redshirted the 2006 season and was a four-year letterman from 2007 to 2010. He appeared in three games as a redshirt freshman in 2007 as the backup to Kellen Lewis, completing one of two passes for 14 yards and one interception. Chappell split time with Lewis throughout the 2008 season, playing in 11 of 12 games while also starting three in place of the injured Lewis. Chappell finished the 2008 season with 80 completions on 153 passing attempts (52.3%) for 1,001 yards, four touchdowns, and three interceptions while also rushing for 72 yards and three touchdowns.

Chappell became the full-time starter in 2009 after Lewis was dismissed from the team. Chappell was named the Big Ten Conference Offensive Player of the Week (shared with Blair White) after throwing for 333 yards and three touchdowns without an interception in a 27–14 victory over Illinois on October 17. Chappell started all 12 games, completing 268 of 428 passes (62.6%) for 2,941 yards, 17 touchdowns, and 15 interceptions while also rushing for three touchdowns as the Hoosiers finished 4–8. He had the most interceptions in the Big Ten and was named honorable mention All-Big Ten by the coaches. He was the first player in school history to complete over 60% of his passes in a season.

Chappell earned Big Ten Offensive Player of the Week honors for the second time in his career after completing 32 of 42 passes (76.2%) for 366 yards, three touchdowns, and no interceptions while also scoring one rushing touchdown in a 38–21 win over Western Kentucky on September 18, 2010. He started all 12 games for the second straight season. He threw for a school-record 480 yards on October 2, 2010, against Michigan. Chappell finished the 2010 season recording 302 completions on 483 passing attempts (62.5%) for 3,295 yards, 24 touchdowns, nine interceptions, and three rushing touchdowns as Indiana went 5–7. He led the Big Ten in completions, passing attempts, passing yards, and passing yards-per-game (274.6), garnering honorable mention all-Big Ten recognition from the media. He was named the team MVP. Chappell finished his college career with school career records in completions (651), attempts (1,066), and completion percentage (61.1) while finishing second in passing yards (7,251) and passing touchdowns (45).

Chappell was a team co-captain in 2009 and 2010. He earned Academic All-Big Ten honors each year from 2007 to 2010. He graduated from Indiana with a bachelor of science in accounting in June 2010. Chappell was a member of the Allstate AFCA Good Works Team and earned an $18,000 postgraduate scholarship as a NFF National Scholar-Athlete. He was a business systems and accounting graduate student during the 2010 season. On June 8, 2011, Chappell was the male recipient of the Big Ten Medal of Honor for Indiana's 2011 graduating class.

== Professional career ==
Chappell went undrafted in the 2011 NFL draft. With Rex Grossman still unsigned by the Washington Redskins, Chappell signed with the team on July 28, 2011. The only statistics he recorded during the preseason were two end-of-game kneel-downs against the Indianapolis Colts on August 19, 2011. He was released on August 30, 2011, before the final preseason game.

== See also ==
- Indiana Hoosiers football statistical leaders
