= 2006 Michigan State Spartans football team =

American college football season

2006 Michigan State Spartans football
- Conference: Big Ten Conference
- Record: 4–8 (1–7 Big Ten)
- Head coach: John L. Smith (4th season)
- Offensive coordinator: Dave Baldwin (4th season)
- Offensive scheme: Spread
- Defensive coordinator: Chris Smeland (4th season)
- Base defense: 4–3
- Home stadium: Spartan Stadium

2006 Big Ten Conference football standings
| | Conf. | | | Overall |
| Team | W | | L | W | | L |
|---|---|---|---|---|---|---|
| No. 2 Ohio State $ | 8 | – | 0 | 12 | – | 1 |
| No. 8 Michigan % | 7 | – | 1 | 11 | – | 2 |
| No. 7 Wisconsin | 7 | – | 1 | 12 | – | 1 |
| No. 24 Penn State | 5 | – | 3 | 9 | – | 4 |
| Purdue | 5 | – | 3 | 8 | – | 6 |
| Minnesota | 3 | – | 5 | 6 | – | 7 |
| Indiana | 3 | – | 5 | 5 | – | 7 |
| Northwestern | 2 | – | 6 | 4 | – | 8 |
| Iowa | 2 | – | 6 | 6 | – | 7 |
| Illinois | 1 | – | 7 | 2 | – | 10 |
| Michigan State | 1 | – | 7 | 4 | – | 8 |
$ – BCS representative as conference champion; % – BCS at-large representative; Rankings from AP Poll

The 2006 Michigan State Spartans football team represented Michigan State University in the 2006 NCAA Division I FBS football season. Michigan State competed as a member of the Big Ten Conference, and played their home games at Spartan Stadium in East Lansing, Michigan. The Spartans were led by fourth-year head coach John L. Smith. Smith had compiled a combined 18–18 record in his previous seasons at Michigan State, and he was fired after the 2006 season in which the team finished 4–8. The Spartans did, however, set the record for the greatest comeback from a deficit in college football history.

== Season recap ==
Michigan State teams during Smith's tenure were "known for their late season collapses". The Spartans started the 2006 season with a 3–0 record with victories over Idaho, Eastern Michigan, and Pittsburgh. The following week, Michigan State led Notre Dame, 37–21, in the third quarter, but surrendered 19 points to lose the game. The Spartans then lost all but one game on the remainder of their schedule.

On October 21, Michigan State traveled to Evanston, Illinois to face Northwestern. By the third quarter, Northwestern had extended its lead to a commanding 38–3. Michigan State gained momentum in the fourth quarter when Devin Thomas blocked a Northwestern punt, which was then returned for a touchdown by Ashton Henderson. Northwestern was forced to punt twice more and Michigan State capitalized on each possession with a touchdown, which tied the game, 38–38. Placekicker Brett Swenson made good the game-winning field goal with 0:13 remaining to play, and Michigan State won the greatest comeback in college football history.

After the record-setting victory, it appeared that Smith's job was temporarily secured, but the administration fired him shortly after a loss to Indiana the following week. The Spartans ended the season with four consecutive losses to finish with a 4–8 overall record and 1–7 against Big Ten opponents. In November, Mark Dantonio was hired as the replacement head coach.

== Schedule ==
| Date | Time | Opponent | Site | TV | Result | Attendance |
|---|---|---|---|---|---|---|
| September 2 | 12:00 p.m. | Idaho* | Spartan Stadium; East Lansing, MI | ESPN+ | W 27–17 | 70,711 |
| September 9 | 3:30 p.m. | Eastern Michigan* | Spartan Stadium; East Lansing, MI | ESPN+ | W 52–20 | 69,856 |
| September 16 | 12:00 p.m. | at Pittsburgh* | Heinz Field; Pittsburgh, PA | ABC | W 38–23 | 47,956 |
| September 23 | 8:00 p.m. | No. 12 Notre Dame* | Spartan Stadium; East Lansing, MI (Megaphone Trophy) | ABC | L 37–40 | 80,193 |
| September 30 | 12:00 p.m. | Illinois^{†} | Spartan Stadium; East Lansing, MI | ESPN+ | L 20–23 | 71,268 |
| October 7 | 4:30 p.m. | at No. 6 Michigan | Michigan Stadium; Ann Arbor, MI (Paul Bunyan Trophy) | ESPN | L 13–31 | 111,349 |
| October 14 | 3:30 p.m. | No. 1 Ohio State | Spartan Stadium; East Lansing, MI | ABC | L 7–38 | 73,498 |
| October 21 | 12:00 p.m. | at Northwestern | Ryan Field; Evanston, IL | ESPN+ | W 41–38 | 29,387 |
| October 28 | 12:00 p.m. | at Indiana | Memorial Stadium; Bloomington, IN (Old Brass Spittoon) | ESPN+ | L 21–46 | 36,444 |
| November 4 | 3:30 p.m. | Purdue | Spartan Stadium; East Lansing, MI | ESPNU | L 15–17 | 65,398 |
| November 11 | 12:00 p.m. | Minnesota | Spartan Stadium; East Lansing, MI | ESPNU | L 18–31 | 64,807 |
| November 18 | 12:00 p.m. | at Penn State | Beaver Stadium; University Park, PA (Land Grant Trophy) | ESPN2 | L 13–17 | 108,607 |
*Non-conference game; ^{†}Homecoming; Rankings from Coaches' Poll released prior to the game; All times are in Eastern time

== Game summaries ==
=== Northwestern ===
| Team | 1 | 2 | 3 | 4 | Total |
|---|---|---|---|---|---|
| • Michigan State | 3 | 0 | 14 | 24 | 41 |
| Northwestern | 7 | 17 | 14 | 0 | 38 |

- Date: October 21
- Location: Ryan Field, Evanston, IL
- Game start: 12:00 p.m. EST
- Game attendance: 29,387
- TV announcers (ESPN+): Wayne Larrivee (Play-by-play) & Kelly Stouffer (Color)

Scoring summary
| Q1 | | MSU | Swenson 32 yard field goal | MSU 3–0 |
| Q1 | | NW | Lane 5 yard pass from Bacher (Howells kick) | NW 7–3 |
| Q2 | | NW | Bacher 2 yard run (Howells kick) | NW 14–3 |
| Q2 | | NW | Howells 30 yard field goal | NW 17–3 |
| Q2 | | NW | Herbert 18 yard pass from Roberson (Howells kick) | NW 24–3 |
| Q3 | | NW | Lane 22 yard pass from Bacher (Howells kick) | NW 31–3 |
| Q3 | | NW | Herbert 5 yard pass from Bacher (Howells kick) | NW 38–3 |
| Q3 | | MSU | Caulcrick 18 yard pass from Stanton (Swenson kick) | NW 38–10 |
| Q3 | | MSU | Jimmerson 4 yard run (Swenson kick) | NW 38–17 |
| Q4 | | MSU | Henderson 31 yard blocked punt return (Swenson kick) | NW 38–24 |
| Q4 | | MSU | Stanton 12 yard run (Swenson kick) | NW 38–31 |
| Q4 | | MSU | Williams 9 yard pass from Stanton (Swenson kick) | Tie 38–38 |
| Q4 | :13 | MSU | Swenson 28 yard field goal | MSU 41–38 |

== Coaching staff ==
- John L. Smith – Head coach
- Blaine Bennett – Assistant head coach/wide receivers coach
- Dave Baldwin – Offensive coordinator/Tight end coach
- Dan Enos – Quarterbacks coach
- Ben Sirmans – Running backs coach/special teams coordinator
- Jeff Stoutland – Offensive line coach
- Chris Smeland – Defensive coordinator/safeties
- Derrick Jackson – Defensive line coach
- Mike Cox – Linebackers coach/recruiting coordinator
- Chuck Driesbach – Defensive backs coach

== 2007 NFL draft ==
The following players were selected in the 2007 NFL draft.

| Player | Round | Pick | Position | NFL team |
|---|---|---|---|---|
| Drew Stanton | 2 | 43 | Quarterback | Detroit Lions |
| Clifton Ryan | 5 | 154 | Defensive Tackle | St. Louis Rams |
| Brandon Fields | 7 | 225 | Punter | Miami Dolphins |
