= Levron Williams =

American football player (born 1979)

No. 12
- Position: Wide receiver

Personal information
- Born: January 12, 1979 (age 47); Evansville, Indiana, U.S.
- Listed height: 6 ft 3 in (1.91 m)
- Listed weight: 200 lb (91 kg)

Career information
- High school: Evansville (IN) Benjamin Bosse
- College: Indiana
- NFL draft: 2001: undrafted

Career history

Playing
- San Diego Chargers* (2002); Calgary Stampeders (2002); Evansville BlueCats (2003); Evansville BlueCats (2006–2007); Evansville Rage (2012)
- * Offseason or practice squad member only

Coaching
- Evansville Rage (WR) (2012)

Awards and highlights
- 2001 Indiana Co-MVP; 2001 1st-Team All-Big Ten; Indiana Record 6 Touchdowns in a single game

Levron Williams (born January 12, 1979) is an American former professional football running back and wide receiver.

== Early life ==
Williams attended Benjamin Bosse High School in Evansville, Indiana. He was named the 1996 Gatorade Indiana High School Football Player of the Year in 1996 after a tremendous junior year.

== College career ==
=== Indiana Hoosiers ===
Williams chose to continue his football career at Indiana University on scholarship, playing for Cam Cameron.

He appeared in nine games as a freshman, but it wasn't until his sophomore year that he became a big part of the Hoosier offense. Williams accounted for over 1,000 total yards during his sophomore campaign, with 817 yards coming on the ground. He was a key cog again as a junior, scoring ten touchdowns and amassing another 821 rushing yards.

As a senior in 2001, Williams and quarterback Antwaan Randle El formed one of the Big Ten's most dynamic offensive duos. He set career-highs in rushing yards (1,401) and touchdowns (17), including a record-setting six-touchdown performance in a 63–20 win at Wisconsin, the Hoosiers' first victory of the season. Williams twice went over the 200-yard mark in that season, also accomplishing the feat by rushing for 251 yards in a road win at Michigan State in November. Williams was selected to the All-Big Ten First-team along with Wisconsin's Anthony Davis after finishing the 2001 season with 1,401 rushing yards. However, despite a 4–4 league record, Indiana's best since the Bill Mallory era, they fell one win short of bowl eligibility (5–6). Williams finished his career without appearing in a postseason game.

In his Indiana career, Williams accounted for over 3,000 rushing yards (3,095), over 1,000 receiving yards (1,088) and 38 touchdowns. He remains the Hoosiers' sixth all-time leading rusher and third all-time leader in rushing touchdowns.

== Professional career ==
=== San Diego Chargers ===
After not hearing his named called in the 2002 NFL draft, Williams signed with the San Diego Chargers on April 23, 2002. He never appeared in an NFL game.
