= Kellen Lewis =

American football player (born 1987)

No. 15 (Indiana)
- Position: Quarterback

Personal information
- Born: January 25, 1987 (age 39)
- Listed height: 6 ft 1 in (1.85 m)
- Listed weight: 185 lb (84 kg)

Career information
- High school: Mandarin (Jacksonville, Florida)
- College: Indiana (2005–2008); Valdosta State (2009)
- NFL draft: 2010: undrafted

Career history
- Tulsa Talons (2011)*
- * Offseason or practice squad member only

Awards and highlights
- Second-team All-Big Ten (2007)

Kellen Chadwick Lewis (born January 25, 1987) is an American former college football quarterback who played for the Indiana Hoosiers and Valdosta State Blazers. In 2007, he set Indiana single-season records with 3,043 passing yards, 28 passing touchdowns, 3,779 yards of total offense, and 37 total touchdowns while leading the team to their first bowl game since 1993. He was later moved to wide receiver after a performance drop, and then dismissed from the team for violating rules. Lewis ended his Indiana career with 48 passing touchdowns, the most in school history at the time.

== Early life ==
Kellen Chadwick Lewis was born on January 25, 1987. He played high school football at Mandarin High School in Jacksonville, Florida, as both a quarterback and cornerback. He accounted for 2,600 total yards and 24 touchdowns his senior year, earning Florida Class 6A District Two Player of the Year honors.

== College career ==
=== Indiana ===
Lewis enrolled at Indiana University Bloomington to play college football for the Hoosiers. He redshirted the 2005 season and was a three-year letterman from 2006 to 2008. He began his redshirt freshman year in 2006 as the third-string quarterback behind Blake Powers and Graeme McFarland. Powers started the season opener but was injured. McFarland started the second game of the year against Ball State but was injured and replaced with Lewis. Lewis started the third game against Illinois but returned to the bench for the fourth game against Connecticut due to Powers returning from injury. However, Powers played poorly in the Connecticut game and was replaced by Lewis for the remainder of the season. Lewis finished the year completing 190 of 346 passes (54.9%) for 2,221 yards, 14 touchdowns, and seven interceptions while also rushing for 441 yards and five touchdowns as Indiana went 5–7. On October 28, 2006, against Michigan State, he tied a school record with six total touchdowns (five passing, one rushing). He was named a Freshman All-American by both the Sporting News and Rivals.com, and the Indiana team MVP.

In 2007, Lewis totaled 265 completions on 442 passing attempts (60.0%) for 3,043 yards, 28 touchdowns, 10 interceptions, 736 rushing yards, nine rushing touchdowns, and one reception for an 87-yard touchdown. He led the Hoosiers to their first bowl game since 1993, the 2007 Insight Bowl. He earned second-team All-Big Ten Conference honors from both the media and coaches. Lewis' 3,043 passing yards, 28 passing touchdowns, 3,779 yards of total offense, and 37 total touchdowns were all single-season school records.

In spring 2008, Lewis was given a four-month suspension for violating team rules, returning before the start of the 2008 season. He played in ten games, starting nine, in 2008 and missed time due to injury. His performance dropped without star James Hardy. Lewis finished the year with 110 completions on 193 attempts (57.0%) for 1,131 yards, six touchdowns, eight interceptions, 500 rushing yards, three rushing touchdowns, two receptions for 17 yards, and three punts for 92 yards.

Lewis was moved to wide receiver in spring 2009. On April 29, 2009, he was dismissed from the team for a second violation of team rules. His 48 career passing touchdowns was a school record. He majored in general studies at Indiana.

=== Valdosta State ===
In 2009, Lewis transferred to Division II Valdosta State University to play quarterback for the Blazers. He received the idea to transfer to Valdosta State from a former high school teammate of his who had previously played there. On October 13, 2009, following his second consecutive game with both 300 passing yards and 100 rushing yards, Lewis was arrested on a misdemeanor battery charge. Despite the arrest, he did not miss any playing time and started the next game for the Blazers, passing for 300 yards for the third straight contest. In the season finale on November 7, 2009, against Edward Waters College, Lewis completed 18 of 22 passes for 217 yards and two touchdowns while also rushing for 105 yards and one touchdown as Valdosta State won 70–6, setting a school record for points in one game.

== Professional career ==
Colts.com listed Lewis as a possible punt/kick returner prospect in the 2010 NFL draft. He went undrafted. On November 12, 2010, he signed with the Tulsa Talons of the Arena Football League (AFL) for the 2011 AFL season as a quarterback. Head coach Mitch Allner said Lewis had a chance to compete for the starting quarterback job. Lewis did not report to training camp in February 2011, with Allner stating Lewis "had something come up football-wise and didn't show up." He was released on June 22, 2011, before ever playing for the Talons.

== Personal life ==
Lewis' father, Kiser Lewis, played linebacker at Florida A&M and was a member of the New Orleans Saints during the 1980 offseason. His mother, Sabrina Lewis, was an All-American hurdler at Florida A&M.

== See also ==
- Indiana Hoosiers football statistical leaders
