= Courtney Roby =

American football player (born 1983)

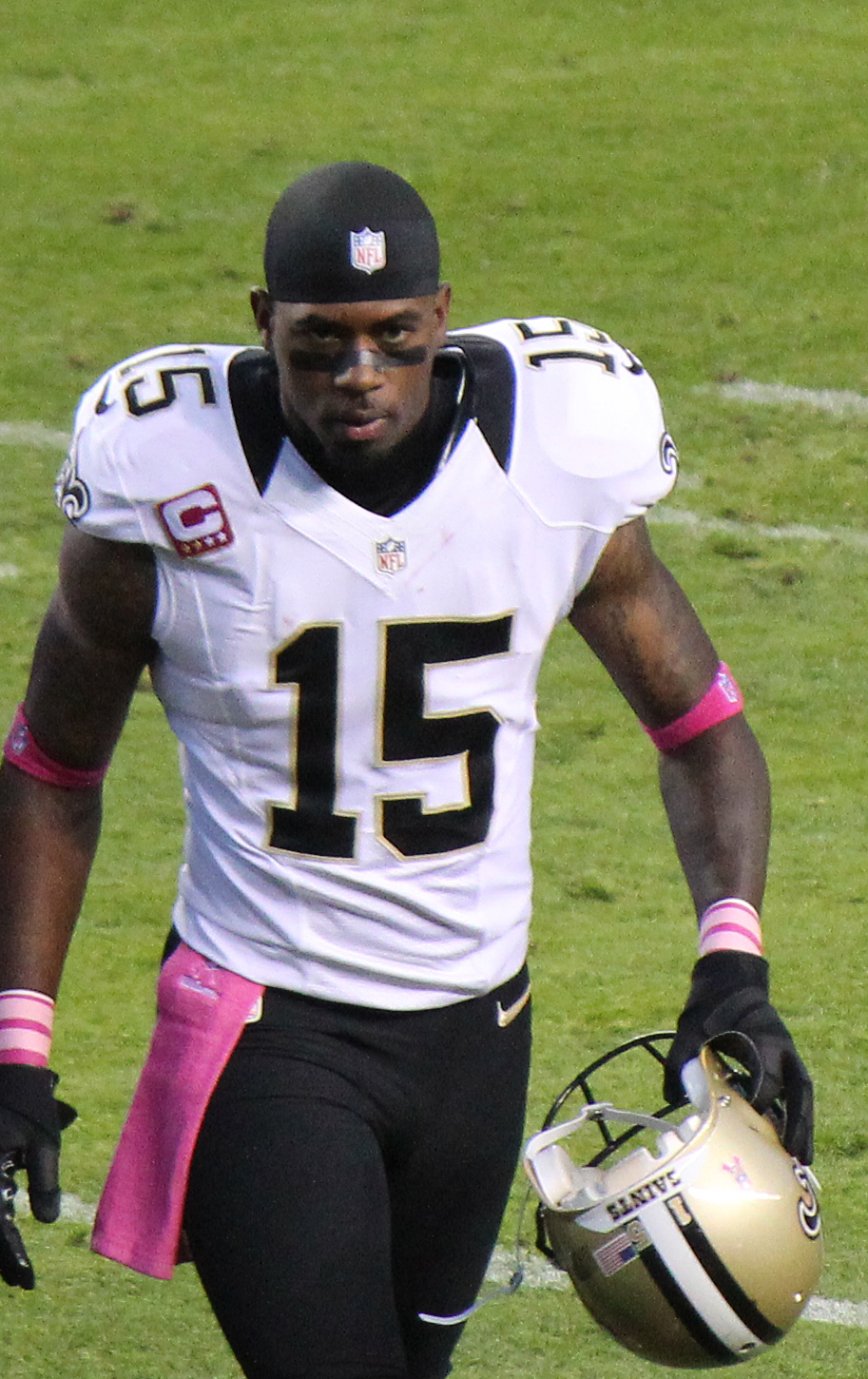
- Roby with the New Orleans Saints in 2012

No. 10, 15, 82
- Position: Wide receiver

Personal information
- Born: January 10, 1983 (age 43); Indianapolis, Indiana, U.S.
- Listed height: 6 ft 0 in (1.83 m)
- Listed weight: 189 lb (86 kg)

Career information
- High school: North Central (Indianapolis)
- College: Indiana
- NFL draft: 2005: 3rd round, 68th overall pick

Career history
- Tennessee Titans (2005–2006); Cincinnati Bengals (2007); Indianapolis Colts (2008); New Orleans Saints (2008–2012); Atlanta Falcons (2014)

Awards and highlights
- Super Bowl champion (XLIV); Second-team All-Big Ten (2004)

Career NFL statistics
- Receptions: 26
- Receiving yards: 343
- Receiving touchdowns: 1
- Return yards: 3,007
- Return touchdowns: 1
- Stats at Pro Football Reference

Courtney Eugene Roby (born January 10, 1983) is an American former professional football player who was a wide receiver in the National Football League (NFL). He played college football for the Indiana Hoosiers and was selected by the Tennessee Titans in the third round of the 2005 NFL draft. Roby also played in the NFL for the Cincinnati Bengals, Indianapolis Colts, New Orleans Saints, and Atlanta Falcons.

== Early life ==
Roby attended North Central High School in Indianapolis, Indiana where he starred in both football and track for the Panthers. As a senior at North Central High School, Roby was an All-State selection in football, after rushing for 539 yards and six touchdowns, catching 12 passes for 296 yards and three touchdowns, while averaging 32 yards per kickoff return and returning three for touchdowns. He was also an All-State selection in track and field while being selected to the Indiana All-Star teams in both sports.

== College career ==
Courtney attended Indiana University as a two sport athlete in football and track. In football, Roby was an elected Captain and team MVP for his senior season while finishing his career as the most productive receiver in Hoosier football history, breaking the all-time records for career receptions and yardage with 170 catches and 2,524 yards. During the 2002 season, he was just the third receiver in Hoosier history to gain over 1,000 yards in a single season, while his 59 receptions ranked second in school history. After completing his senior campaign, Roby was selected to participate in the Senior Bowl All-Star game, an honor given to the top NFL prospects in the country.

As a member of the Indiana University track and field team, Roby competed in the 100 m dash and 4 × 100 m relay. As a junior he placed fourth in the Big Ten Conference Championships 100 m.

== Professional career ==
=== Tennessee Titans ===
Roby was selected by the Tennessee Titans in the third round of the 2005 NFL draft with the 68th overall pick. He was released by the Titans on September 1, 2007.

=== Cincinnati Bengals ===
Roby was signed by the Cincinnati Bengals on October 16, 2007. On October 26, 2007, he was released by the Bengals.

=== Indianapolis Colts ===
On January 14, 2008, Roby was signed by his hometown team, the Indianapolis Colts. He was released on September 11, 2008.

=== New Orleans Saints ===
The New Orleans Saints, signed Roby on October 16, 2008. He played in five games for the Saints before suffering an injury and being placed on the injured reserve list. A free agent after the 2008 season, Roby re-signed with the Saints on March 16, 2009. On November 15, 2009, Roby returned a kickoff 97 yards for a touchdown, while his 61-yard return in the victory over the Minnesota Vikings in the NFC Championship game set a postseason club record. Courtney finished the season ranked third in the NFL for kick return yardage and was the primary kick returner and top special teams contributor during their run to a victory in Super Bowl XLIV, leading to being voted as the Saints’ Special Teams MVP.

Roby returned as the Saints’ primary kick returner and gunner for the 2010 season. In the December 12, 2010, game against St. Louis, Roby suffered an apparently serious concussion and neck injury on a kickoff return; he was removed from the field on a cart and taken to the hospital by ambulance. Roby was placed on the injured reserve list on December 29, 2010. He became an unrestricted free agent following the 2011 season, but was re-signed on April 16, 2012. Roby was released on August 31, 2013.

=== Atlanta Falcons ===
On June 27, 2014, Roby was signed by the Atlanta Falcons. He was released on October 7, 2014.

== Personal ==
Roby was born to John Roby Jr., and Donita Turner-Douglas. He is the oldest of four with two brothers, Brandon Walker-Roby, who is also a former wide receiver at Indiana University (2005–2008) and John "Tre" Roby III, a former WR at Lindenwood University. Roby has one sister, Karrington.

Roby comes from a family of athletes: his father John Roby Jr. played basketball for the University of Indianapolis (formerly known as Indiana Central University), his cousin Landon Turner starred for the 1981 NCAA Championship Indiana University basketball team, and his uncle Rob Turner played wide receiver at Indiana University (1987–90). Roby is also the cousin of Darren Sproles, who played running back in the NFL, and the late NFL punter Reggie Roby.

Courtney married his wife Krystal on July 13, 2013, with whom he has two daughters.
