= Jahkeen Gilmore =

American football player (born 1983)

Profile
- Position: Wide receiver

Personal information
- Born: August 25, 1983 (age 43)
- Listed height: 6 ft 0 in (1.83 m)

Career information
- High school: Brooklyn (NY) Poly Prep
- College: Indiana Hoosiers

Career history
- Carolina Panthers (2007)*
- * Offseason or practice squad member only

Jakheen Gilmore (born August 25, 1983) is a former wide receiver for Indiana University.

== High school years ==
Gilmore attended Poly Prep Country Day School in Brooklyn, New York and was a student and a letterman in football and track. In football, he was an All-City selection and an All-State selection.
