= Shane Wynn =

American football player (born 1992)

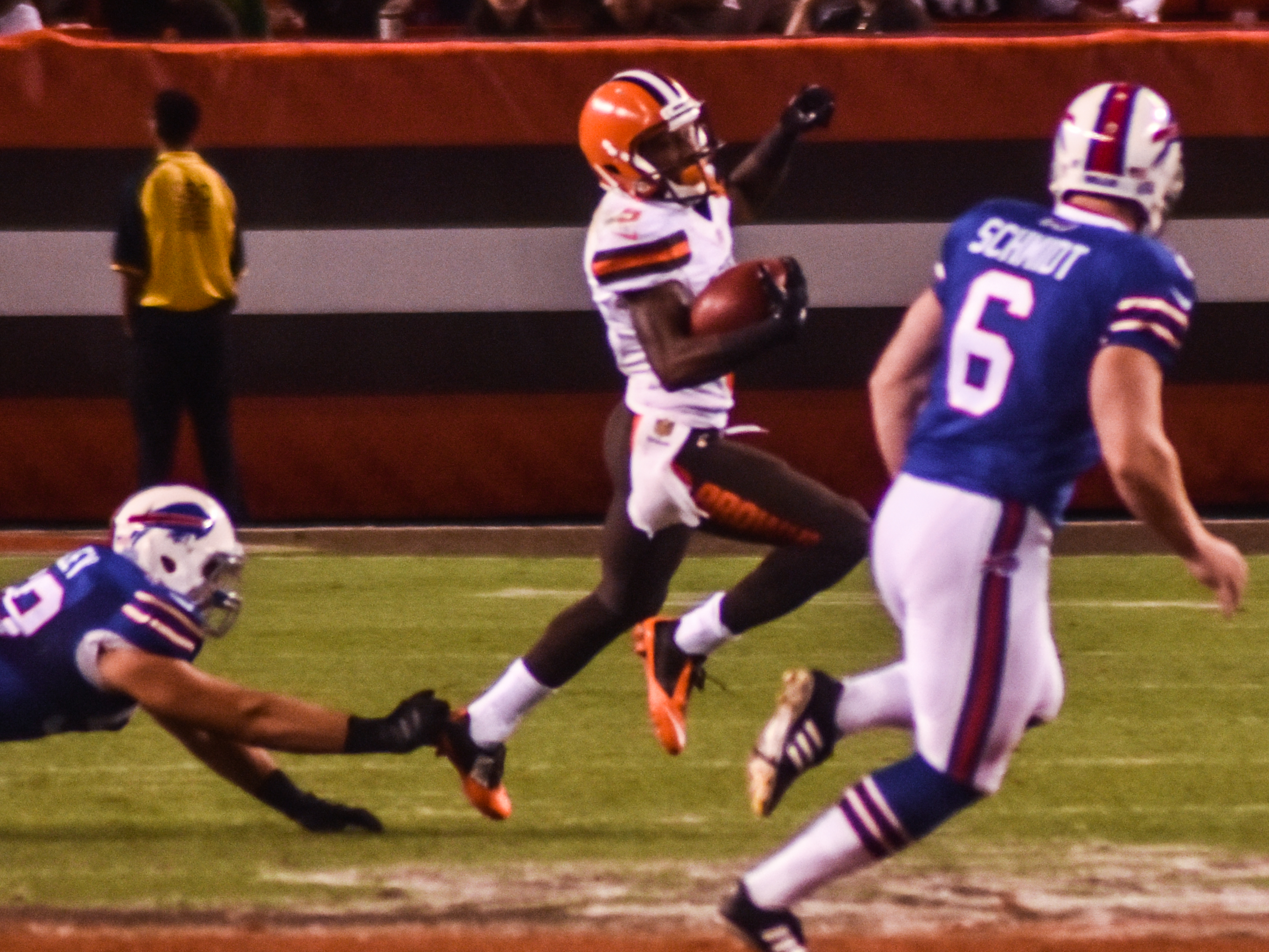
- Wynn with the Cleveland Browns in 2015

No. 85
- Position: Wide receiver

Personal information
- Born: November 15, 1992 (age 34); Cleveland, Ohio, U.S.
- Listed height: 5 ft 6 in (1.68 m)
- Listed weight: 167 lb (76 kg)

Career information
- High school: Glenville (Cleveland, Ohio)
- College: Indiana
- NFL draft: 2015: undrafted

Career history
- Atlanta Falcons (2015)*; Cleveland Browns (2015)*; New York Jets (2015)*; San Diego Chargers (2015)*; New Orleans Saints (2015–2016)*; Jacksonville Jaguars (2016–2017); New Orleans Saints (2018)*; Ottawa Redblacks (2022)*; BC Lions (2022)
- * Offseason or practice squad member only

Career NFL statistics
- Receptions: 1
- Receiving yards: 19
- Rushing attempts: 2
- Rushing yards: 5
- Stats at Pro Football Reference

Shane C. Wynn (born November 15, 1992) is an American former professional football player who was a wide receiver in the National Football League (NFL) and Canadian Football League (CFL). He was signed by the Atlanta Falcons as an undrafted free agent. He played college football at Indiana. He was also a member of the Cleveland Browns, New York Jets, San Diego Chargers, New Orleans Saints, Jacksonville Jaguars, Ottawa Redblacks, and BC Lions.

== Early life ==
Wynn attended Ginn Academy in the Glenville area of Cleveland, Ohio, where he was teammates with Ohio State quarterback Cardale Jones. He played wide receiver and also returned kicks and punts. As a senior, he was all-district selection and named third-team All-Ohio. In addition to football, Wynn was a stand-out track athlete, winning Ohio state title in 2009 and 2010 in the 4 × 200 m relay and the 4x400 indoor relay.

Considered a three-star recruit by all major rating services, Wynn was ranked as the No. 62 wide receiver nationally in 2011. He chose Indiana over Penn State and Toledo on National Signing Day.

College recruiting
Name	Hometown	School	Height	Weight	Commit date
Shane Wynn; WR	Cleveland, OH	Glenville HS	5 ft 7 in (1.70 m)	147 lb (67 kg)	Feb 2, 2011
Shane Wynn; WR	Recruit ratings: Scout: Rivals: 247Sports: ESPN:				
Overall recruit ranking: Scout: 91 (WR) Rivals: 62 (WR) 247Sports: 55 (WR) ESPN: 41 (WR)
Note: In many cases, Scout, Rivals, 247Sports, On3, and ESPN may conflict in their listings of height and weight.; In these cases, the average was taken. ESPN grades are on a 100-point scale.; Sources: "Indiana Football Commitment List". Rivals.; "2011 Player Commits". ESPN.; "2011 Team Ranking". Rivals.com.

== College career ==
As a freshman, Wynn lead the Hoosiers with 1,249 all-purpose yards. Most of his production was on kick returns, as he returned 48 kicks for 1,015 yards and a touchdown. His kick return and all-purpose yardage totals were Indiana true freshman records. He was named Big Ten Freshman of the Week after returning the opening kickoff for a 99-yard touchdown against Illinois.

In 2012, Wynn received honorable mention All-Big Ten from the media. He returned only eight kicks all season, but led the Hoosiers in receptions (68) and was second on the team in yardage (660).

in 2013, Wynn finished second in the Big Ten (and 19th nationally) with 11 receiving touchdowns. In the season opener against Indiana State, Wynn scored two touchdowns on receptions and a third score on a punt return. He scored three receiving touchdowns to close out the season in a rivalry win over Purdue. His fourteen total touchdowns are tied for sixth most in school history.

Prior to his senior season, Wynn was elected one of the team captains (alongside Tevin Coleman, Collin Rahrig, and Bobby Richardson). He recorded a career-high 708 receiving yards, scoring three touchdowns and adding two more scores on the ground. He averaged 96.6 all-purpose yards per game, which ranked second on the team behind All-American Coleman. Wynn capped off his college career with another win over Purdue in the Old Oaken Bucket Game. He was once again named honorable mention All-Big Ten, this time by both the coaches and media.

== Professional career ==
Pre-draft measurables
Height	Weight	Arm length	Hand span	40-yard dash	10-yard split	20-yard split	20-yard shuttle	Three-cone drill	Vertical jump	Broad jump	Bench press
5 ft 6 in (1.68 m)	167 lb (76 kg)	29 1/2 in (0.75 m)	8 7/8 in (0.23 m)	4.34 s	1.49 s	2.47 s	4.25 s	6.87 s	36.0 in (0.91 m)	10 ft 0 in (3.05 m)	13 reps
All values from Pro Day

=== Atlanta Falcons ===
Wynn was not selected during the 2015 NFL draft, but shortly after the close of the seventh round, it was announced that he had signed as a free agent with the Atlanta Falcons. On June 18, 2015, he was waived by the team.

=== Cleveland Browns ===
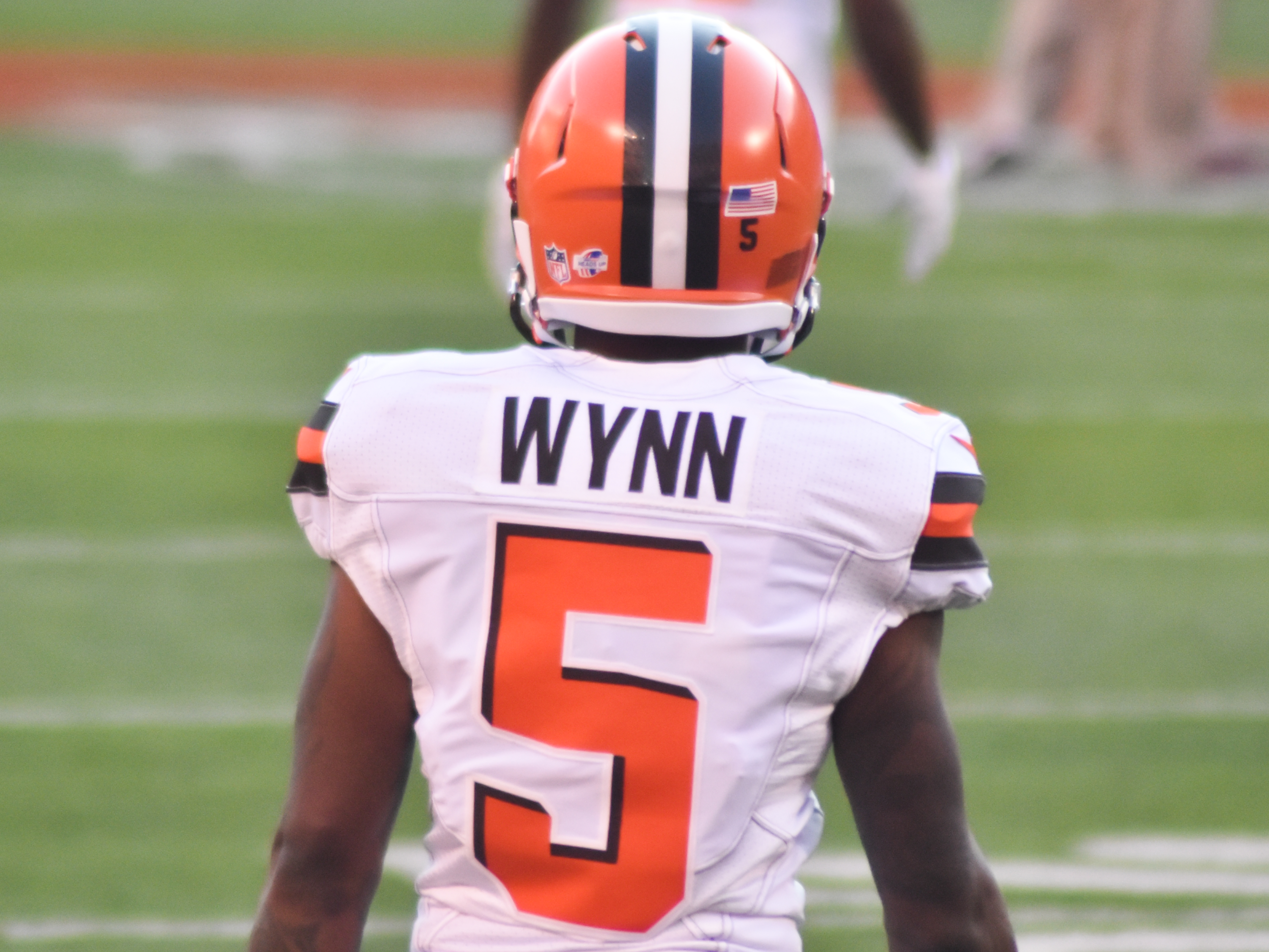
Wynn with the Browns in 2015

On June 19, 2015, Wynn was claimed off waivers by the Cleveland Browns. In his second preseason game with the Browns, Wynn caught a 21-yard touchdown pass from Johnny Manziel. He was released by the Browns on August 31, 2015.

=== New York Jets ===
Wynn was signed to the New York Jets practice squad on November 4, 2015. On November 16, 2015, Wynn was released by the team.

=== San Diego Chargers ===
On December 2, 2015, the San Diego Chargers signed Wynn to their practice squad, replacing wide receiver Donte Foster. On December 11, 2015, the San Diego Chargers waived Wynn from their practice squad.

=== New Orleans Saints (first stint) ===
On December 16, 2015, the New Orleans Saints signed Wynn to their practice squad. On May 15, 2016, the Saints released Wynn.

=== Jacksonville Jaguars ===
Wynn signed with the Jacksonville Jaguars on June 16, 2016. On September 3, 2016, he was released by the Jaguars and was signed to the practice squad the next day. He was promoted to the active roster on December 3, 2016. On September 2, 2017, Wynn was placed on injured reserve. On September 1, 2018, Wynn was waived by the Jaguars.

=== New Orleans Saints (second stint) ===
On October 17, 2018, Wynn was signed to the Saints practice squad.

=== Ottawa Redblacks ===
On April 12, 2022, Wynn signed with the Ottawa Redblacks of the Canadian Football League (CFL). He was released by the Ottawa Redblacks two days before the team's first preseason game.

=== BC Lions ===
On July 16, 2022, Wynn was signed to the practice roster of the BC Lions. He was promoted to the active roster on August 18. He was released on October 20, 2022.
