= Graeme McFarland =

American football player

Graeme E. McFarland
Indiana University
- Position: Quarterback

Graeme E. McFarland is a former American football quarterback for the Indiana Hoosiers football team in 2003, 2005 and 2006. He appeared in 27 games and completed 33 of 72 passes for 355 yards and four touchdowns.

In 2007, McFarland graduated magna cum laude from Indiana University with a bachelor's degree in biology. He later attended medical school at the University of Alabama at Birmingham School of Medicine and was an assistant professor in vascular surgery and the associate program director for its general surgery residency.
