= Matt Mayberry =

American football player (born 1987)

Matthew Mayberry
No. 94
- Position: Linebacker

Personal information
- Born: August 6, 1987 (age 39); Darien, Illinois
- Listed height: 6 ft 2 in (1.88 m)
- Listed weight: 215 lb (98 kg)

Career information
- College: Indiana
- NFL draft: 2010: undrafted

Career history
- Chicago Bears (2010)

Matthew Mayberry (born August 6, 1987) is an American former football linebacker for the Indiana Hoosiers of the NCAA, and the Chicago Bears of the NFL.

== Early life ==
Matt Mayberry was born in Darien, Illinois, in 1987. He attended Hinsdale South High School, where he played fullback, middle linebacker, and safety. He rushed for 2,242 yards and 36 touchdowns while guiding his team to a 10-2 finish as a senior. He garnered all-state honors as well as the Reporter-Progress/Suburban Life Player of the Year Award. He graduated with the school's career records for most rushing yards (2,827), and most touchdowns (39) and set single-season records for most rushing yards (2,242) and most touchdowns (5).

Mayberry was widely recruited before the start of his senior season at Hinsdale South High School, ending up with 19 scholarship offers. He chose Indiana University to play for Terry Hoeppner.

== College ==
At Indiana University, Mayberry received the 2009 Howard Brown Award, given to the player who exemplifies leadership, courage, and work ethic. He started the final 24 games of his career at middle linebacker and closed out his time in Bloomington with nine double-digit tackle games and at least 10 stops in eight of his final 11 conference contests. Mayberry ended his career with 251 tackles, 139 solo, 10.5 sacks, 22.5 tackles for loss, three interceptions and three fumble recoveries.

== NFL ==
Mayberry was signed by the Chicago Bears in 2010. Mayberry played the final three quarters in the 2010 preseason opener against the San Diego Chargers. He finished third on the Bears with five tackles, including one for a three-yard loss. He broke up one pass. During the game, Mayberry suffered an ankle injury. After the game, MRIs determined that it was a fracture in the bone that would sideline him for six months, bringing about the end of his playing career.
