= Whop Philyor =

American football player (born 1998)

Profile
- Position: Wide receiver

Personal information
- Born: July 31, 1998 (age 28); Tampa, Florida, U.S.
- Listed height: 5 ft 11 in (1.80 m)
- Listed weight: 180 lb (82 kg)

Career information
- High school: H.B. Plant (Tampa, Florida)
- College: Indiana
- NFL draft: 2021: undrafted

Career history
- Minnesota Vikings (2021)*; Michigan Panthers (2023); Houston Roughnecks (2024)*
- * Offseason or practice squad member only

Awards and highlights
- Second-team All-Big Ten (2019)
- Stats at Pro Football Reference

Mister Elias De'Angelo "Whop" Philyor (born July 31, 1998) is an American football wide receiver. He played college football for the Indiana Hoosiers.

== Early life ==
Philyor grew up in Tampa, Florida, and attended Henry B. Plant High School. As a senior, he caught 91 passes for 1,329 yards and 20 touchdowns.

== College career ==
Philyor had 23 receptions for 235 yards and one touchdown in seven total games in his sophomore season, which was cut short due to injury. He was named second-team All-Big Ten Conference as a junior after catching 70 passes for 1,002 yards and five touchdowns. Philyor considered entering the 2020 NFL Draft after the season, but ultimately opted to return to Indiana for his senior year. He was named to the Fred Biletnikoff Award watchlist going into his senior season. Philyor finished the season with 54 catches for 495 yards and three touchdowns and was named honorable mention All-Big Ten.

== Professional career ==
Pre-draft measurables
Height	Weight	Arm length	Hand span	40-yard dash	10-yard split	20-yard split	20-yard shuttle	Three-cone drill	Vertical jump	Broad jump	Bench press
5 ft 9 5/8 in (1.77 m)	184 lb (83 kg)	30 5/8 in (0.78 m)	9 1/4 in (0.23 m)	4.58 s	1.62 s	2.76 s	4.38 s	7.20 s	31.0 in (0.79 m)	10 ft 0 in (3.05 m)	14 reps
All values from Pro Day

=== Minnesota Vikings ===
Philyor signed with the Minnesota Vikings as an undrafted free agent on May 5, 2021. He was waived on August 31, 2021, and re-signed to the practice squad the next day. He was released on October 4, 2021.

=== Michigan Panthers ===
On September 26, 2022, Philyor signed with the Michigan Panthers of the United States Football League (USFL). He was released on May 23, 2023.

=== Houston Roughnecks ===
On February 29, 2024, Philyor was signed by the Houston Roughnecks of the United Football League (UFL). He was released on March 10, 2024.
