= Marcus Thigpen =

American football player (born 1986)

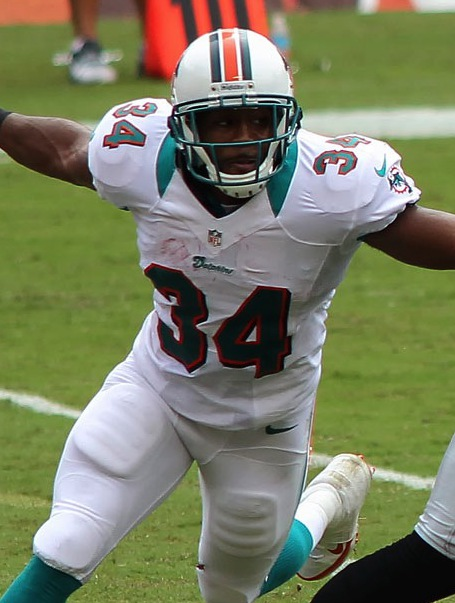
- Thigpen with the Miami Dolphins in 2012

No. 34, 19, 11
- Positions: Running back, kick returner

Personal information
- Born: May 15, 1986 (age 40); Detroit, Michigan, U.S.
- Listed height: 5 ft 9 in (1.75 m)
- Listed weight: 193 lb (88 kg)

Career information
- High school: Mumford (Detroit)
- College: Indiana
- NFL draft: 2009: undrafted

Career history
- Philadelphia Eagles (2009)*; Denver Broncos (2009)*; Saskatchewan Roughriders (2009); Hamilton Tiger-Cats (2010–2011); Miami Dolphins (2012–2013); New England Patriots (2014)*; Miami Dolphins (2014)*; Tampa Bay Buccaneers (2014); Buffalo Bills (2014–2015); Indianapolis Colts (2015); Oakland Raiders (2015); Buffalo Bills (2015); Saskatchewan Roughriders (2017–2019); Toronto Argonauts (2020)*
- * Offseason or practice squad member only

Awards and highlights
- Frank M. Gibson Trophy (2010); First-team All-American (2006)

Career NFL statistics
- Return yards: 4,452
- Rushing yards: 25
- Receptions: 9
- Receiving yards: 112
- Total touchdowns: 4
- Stats at Pro Football Reference

Career CFL statistics
- Rushing yards: 861
- Receptions: 80
- Receiving yards: 924
- Return yards: 4,120
- Total touchdowns: 20
- Stats at CFL.ca

Marcus Arnette Thigpen (born May 15, 1986) is an American former professional football player who was a running back and kick returner in the National Football League (NFL) and Canadian Football League (CFL). He played college football for the Indiana Hoosiers, earning first-team All-American honors in 2006. He signed with the Philadelphia Eagles as an undrafted free agent in 2009. Thigpen was also a member of the Denver Broncos, Hamilton Tiger-Cats, Miami Dolphins, New England Patriots, Tampa Bay Buccaneers, Buffalo Bills, Indianapolis Colts, Oakland Raiders, and Saskatchewan Roughriders.

== Early life ==
Thigpen attended Mumford High School in Detroit, Michigan and was a letterman in football and track. During his high school career, he was one of the top sprinters in the state of Michigan. During his senior year (2004), he won the MHSAA Division I 100-meter dash with a time of 10.82 and led Mumford to its third consecutive outdoor state track and field title in as many years. He also led the Detroit Public School League with 1,785 yards and twenty touchdowns. In 2011, Mumford won its 11th state track and field championship in the school's history.

== College career ==
After high school, Thigpen enrolled at Indiana University but was redshirted his freshman year. During his four years of competition (2005–2008), he finished his career as the third best kick returner (2,009 yards) in the school's history. He also ranks third in all-purpose yards with 4,655 and scored 21 touchdowns. He was the first IU player to get more than 1,000 yards in rushing (1,621), receiving (1,028) and kick returning (2,009). He was selected as one of the team's captains as a fifth-year senior and was named IU's offensive player of the year in 2008. He graduated in 2009 with a major in social/behavioral science and criminal justice.

=== Track and field ===
Thigpen led the Hoosiers with a 2006 season-best time of 10.65 in the 100 meters, which he clocked at the Big Ten Outdoor Championships, good for sixth place. He also ran the first leg of IU's 4 × 100 meter relay team that clocked 40.13 seconds, which is the third fastest time in IU history at the NCAA Mideast Regional Championship. In 2006, he took seventh in the 60 meters, with a time of 6.89 seconds and sixth in the 200 meters, with a time of 21.94 seconds at the Big Ten indoor meet, and he placed seventh in the 100 meters at the Big Ten outdoor meet, with a time of 10.75 seconds.

His personal bests are 6.77 seconds in the 60 meters, 10.34 seconds in the 100 meters and 21.27 seconds in the 200 meters.

==== Personal bests ====
Event	Time (seconds)	Venue	Date
60 meters	6.77	Bloomington, Indiana	February 17, 2006
100 meters	10.34	Knoxville, Tennessee	April 11, 2008
200 meters	21.27	Bloomington, Indiana	April 18, 2008

== Professional career ==
=== 2009 Indiana's Pro Day Combine ===
Pre-draft measurables
Height	Weight	40-yard dash	10-yard split	20-yard split	20-yard shuttle	Three-cone drill	Vertical jump	Broad jump	Bench press
5 ft 9 in (1.75 m)	196 lb (89 kg)	4.29 s	1.21 s	2.23 s	4.16 s	7.20 s	29 in (0.74 m)	10.2 ft 6 in (3.26 m)	26 reps
All values from NFL Combine

=== Philadelphia Eagles ===
After going undrafted in the 2009 NFL draft, Thigpen was signed as an undrafted free agent by the Philadelphia Eagles on April 27, 2009. He was waived on August 4.

=== Denver Broncos ===
Thigpen signed with the Denver Broncos on August 16, 2009. He was waived on August 26.

=== Saskatchewan Roughriders (first stint) ===
Thigpen signed a practice roster agreement with the Saskatchewan Roughriders on October 2, 2009. He was removed from the practice roster and signed to the active roster on November 7. He was part of the final cuts following the 2010 training camp.

=== Hamilton Tiger-Cats ===
Thigpen was signed to the Hamilton Tiger-Cats' active roster on June 26, 2010. He returned the team's first kickoff of the 2010 season for a touchdown against the Winnipeg Blue Bombers and was named the CFL Special Teams Player of Week 1. In week 2, he returned a Burke Dales punt for a touchdown and caught a touchdown pass. On August 13, 2010, after rushing for a touchdown, Thigpen became the first player in CFL history to score a touchdown five different ways in one season. In total, he had scored on a kickoff return, punt return, missed field goal return, a running play and a reception.

=== Miami Dolphins (first stint) ===
Thigpen was signed to a reserve/future contract by the Dolphins on January 12, 2012.

On September 9, 2012, Thigpen returned a punt 72 yards for a touchdown in his first NFL game versus the Houston Texans. This was the first punt return touchdown by the Miami Dolphins since 2007, when Ted Ginn Jr. returned a punt for a TD versus the Philadelphia Eagles. On November 15, 2012, Thigpen returned a kickoff 96 yards for a touchdown against the Buffalo Bills. On December 15, 2013, he caught a 14-yard touchdown strike from Ryan Tannehill with 1:15 left in the 4th quarter to provide the winning margin over the New England Patriots, which put an end to the Patriots' string of three come-from-behind victories in 2013 and also snapped the Dolphins' seven-game losing streak to New England.

Thigpen was released by Miami during their final cuts on August 30, 2014.

=== New England Patriots ===
On September 3, 2014, Thigpen was signed by the New England Patriots to their practice squad and released a week later on September 10, 2014.

=== Miami Dolphins (second stint) ===
On September 23, 2014, Thigpen was re-signed by the Miami Dolphins to their practice squad. His position was changed from running back to wide receiver, and he changed from uniform number 34 to 19.

=== Tampa Bay Buccaneers ===
Thigpen signed with the Tampa Bay Buccaneers practice squad on October 21, 2014. He was promoted to the active roster on October 31, 2014, after Trindon Holliday was waived/injured.

=== Buffalo Bills (first stint) ===
Due to an injury to starter Leodis McKelvin, Thigpen was claimed off waivers by the Buffalo Bills on November 26, 2014. In the Bills game against the Green Bay Packers, Thigpen took a Tim Masthay punt at the Buffalo 25, sprinted to the left hash mark and then to the left sideline for a 75-yard touchdown. This play gave Buffalo a 7–3 lead and was vital to the 21-13 Buffalo win. It also earned Thigpen Peter King's MMQB Special Teams Player of the Week Award.

Thigpen was released from the Bills on October 7 in favor of wide receiver Denarius Moore.

=== Indianapolis Colts ===
Thigpen signed with Indianapolis Colts on October 12, 2015, but was released several days later on October 17, never playing a game with the team.

=== Oakland Raiders ===
Thigpen signed with the Oakland Raiders on November 4, 2015. Thigpen was waived by the Raiders on November 14, 2015.

=== Buffalo Bills (second stint) ===
On November 25, 2015, Thigpen re-signed with the Buffalo Bills. On December 22, 2015, the Bills waived Thigpen.

=== Saskatchewan Roughriders (second stint) ===
On September 12, 2017, the Saskatchewan Roughriders announced that they had signed Thigpen to their practice roster as a kick returner. Thigpen played in only two regular season games for the Riders in 2017, carrying the ball seven times for 32 yards, and catching two passes for 31 yards. He also returned two punts and one kick return. Playing mainly as a running back in the 2017 Eastern Semi-final game in Ottawa, he amassed 169 rushing yards, including a 75-yard touchdown, placing him third all-time for a Saskatchewan player in a playoff game. He also had 38 yards on two kickoff returns to help defeat the Ottawa Redblacks 31–20. On March 12, 2018, Thigpen was suspended two-games by the CFL for violating the leagues drug policy; Thigpen tested positive for the banned substance dehydrochloromethyltestosterone. Thigpen set CFL career highs in rushing attempts (48) and yards (408) and rushing touchdowns (4) in 13 games with the Riders in the 2018 season. He also caught 24 passes for 233 yards, and returned 21 kickoffs, and 13 punts. Following the season he was re-signed by the Riders. The Roughriders released Thigpen on February 5, 2020.

=== Toronto Argonauts ===
On February 10, 2020, Thigpen signed with the Toronto Argonauts. After the CFL canceled the 2020 season due to the COVID-19 pandemic, Thigpen chose to opt-out of his contract with the Argonauts on September 3, 2020.
