= Kemp Rasmussen =

American football player (born 1979)

No. 97
- Position: Defensive end

Personal information
- Born: May 25, 1979 (age 47); Rochester, Michigan, U.S.
- Listed height: 6 ft 3 in (1.91 m)
- Listed weight: 265 lb (120 kg)

Career information
- High school: Lapeer West (MI)
- College: Indiana
- NFL draft: 2002: undrafted

Career history
- Carolina Panthers (2002–2005); Seattle Seahawks (2006)

Career NFL statistics
- Tackles: 53
- Sacks: 1
- Forced fumbles: 1
- Stats at Pro Football Reference

Kemp Alan Rasmussen (born May 25, 1979) is an American former professional football player who was a defensive lineman for the Carolina Panthers of the National Football League (NFL) from 2002 to 2005. He signed with the Seattle Seahawks in 2006, but he was placed on the injured reserve list. Rasmussen played college football for the Indiana Hoosiers.

Following his NFL career, Rasmussen became a firefighter with the Charlotte Fire Department.
