= Indiana–Kentucky football rivalry =

American college football rivalry

Battle of the Barrel
- Indiana Hoosiers Kentucky Wildcats
- Sport: Football
- First meeting: November 30, 1893; Tied, 24–24
- Latest meeting: September 17, 2005; Indiana, 38–14
- Trophy: Bourbon Barrel (1987–1999)

Statistics
- Total meetings: 36
- All-time series: Indiana 18–17–1
- Largest victory: Kentucky, 49–7 (1997)
- Longest win streak: Indiana, 8 (1919–1973)
- Current win streak: Indiana, 1 (2005–present)

Locations of Indiana and Kentucky

The Indiana–Kentucky football rivalry is a dormant American college football rivalry between the Indiana Hoosiers and Kentucky Wildcats. The Hoosiers played the Wildcats for the first time in 1893 at Lexington, and both tied the game at 24. They played annually in football from 1987 until 2005 in what was known as the "Bourbon Barrel" game as C. M. Newton wanted something similar to the Kentucky–Tennessee rivalry, beer barrel.

== Bourbon Barrel ==
The two teams played for a trophy called the "Bourbon Barrel" from 1987 until both schools mutually agreed to retire the trophy in 1999 following the alcohol-related death of a Kentucky football player. Indiana leads the series (18–17–1).

== Game results ==
Indiana victories	Kentucky victories	Tie games

No.	Date	Location	Winner	Score
1	November 30, 1893	Lexington, KY	Tie	24–24
2	October 8, 1904	Bloomington, IN	Kentucky	12–0
3	October 7, 1905	Bloomington, IN	Indiana	29–0
4	October 5, 1918	Bloomington, IN	Kentucky	24–7
5	October 11, 1919	Lexington, KY	Indiana	24–0
6	October 9, 1926	Bloomington, IN	Indiana	14–6
7	October 1, 1927	Lexington, KY	Indiana	21–0
8	September 23, 1967	Bloomington, IN	Indiana	12–10
9	September 20, 1969	Lexington, KY	#14 Indiana	58–30
10	September 18, 1971	Bloomington, IN	Indiana	26–8
11	September 30, 1972	Lexington, KY	Indiana	35–34
12	September 29, 1973	Bloomington, IN	Indiana	17–3
13	September 28, 1974	Lexington, KY	Kentucky	28–22
14	September 22, 1979	Bloomington, IN	Indiana	18–10
15	September 20, 1980	Lexington, KY	Indiana	36–30
16	September 17, 1983	Lexington, KY	Kentucky	24–13
17	September 15, 1984	Bloomington, IN	Kentucky	48–14
18	September 19, 1987	Lexington, KY	Kentucky	34–15
19	September 17, 1988	Bloomington, IN	Indiana	36–15

No.	Date	Location	Winner	Score
20	September 9, 1989	Lexington, KY	Kentucky	17–14
21	September 15, 1990	Lexington, KY	Indiana	45–24
22	September 21, 1991	Bloomington, IN	Indiana	13–10
23	September 19, 1992	Lexington, KY	Kentucky	37–25
24	September 18, 1993	Bloomington, IN	Indiana	24–8
25	September 17, 1994	Lexington, KY	Indiana	59–29
26	September 16, 1995	Bloomington, IN	Kentucky	17–10
27	September 21, 1996	Lexington, KY	Kentucky	3–0
28	September 20, 1997	Bloomington, IN	Kentucky	49–7
29	September 19, 1998	Lexington, KY	Kentucky	31–27
30	September 18, 1999	Bloomington, IN	Kentucky	44–35
31	September 16, 2000	Lexington, KY	Kentucky	41–34
32	December 1, 2001	Bloomington, IN	Indiana	26–15
33	September 14, 2002	Lexington, KY	Kentucky	27–17
34	September 20, 2003	Bloomington, IN	Kentucky	34–17
35	September 18, 2004	Lexington, KY	Kentucky	51–32
36	September 17, 2005	Bloomington, IN	Indiana	38–14
Series: Indiana leads 18–17–1

By decade (through 2025)

Indiana advantage	Kentucky advantage	Tie

Decade	Indiana	Kentucky	Tie
1890s			1
1900s	1	1	
1910s	1	1	
1920s	2		
1930s			
1940s			
1950s			
1960s	2		
1970s	4	1	
1980s	2	4	
1990s	4	6	
2000s	2	4	
2010s			
2020s			
Total	18	17	1

== See also ==
- Indiana–Kentucky rivalry
- List of NCAA college football rivalry games
