= Gen. William Grose House =

Historic house in Indiana, United States

- U.S. National Register of Historic Places
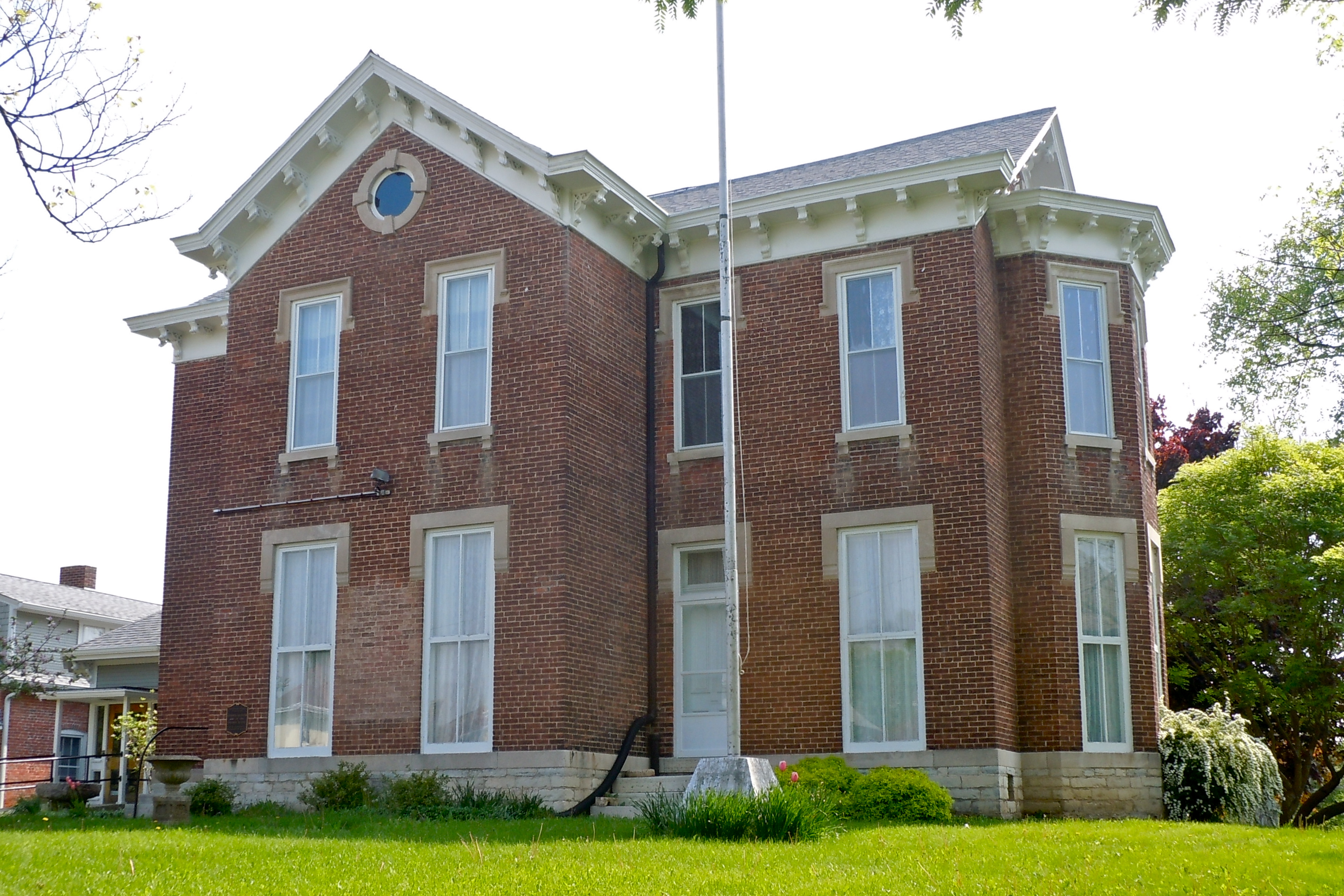
- Front of the house

- Location within Indiana Location within the United States
- Location: 606 S. 14th St., New Castle, Indiana
- Coordinates: 39°55′33″N 85°22′9″W
- Area: Less than 1 acre (0.40 ha)
- Built: 1870
- Architectural style: Italianate
- NRHP reference No.: 83000034
- Added to NRHP: June 23, 1983

The General William Grose House is a historic home located at 614 S. 14th St., New Castle, Indiana. It is the home of the Henry County Historical Society. The Italianate mansion was built in 1870 by Civil War Major General William Grose and his wife Rebecca. General Grose commanded the 36th Indiana Infantry Regiment and fought in the battles at Vicksburg, Chattanooga, Chickmauga and Atlanta. He resided in the house until his death in 1900. The Henry County Historical Society acquired the 16 room mansion in 1902 and operates it as a museum.

It was added to the National Register of Historic Places in 1983.
