= Tom Allen (American football) =

American football coach (born 1970)

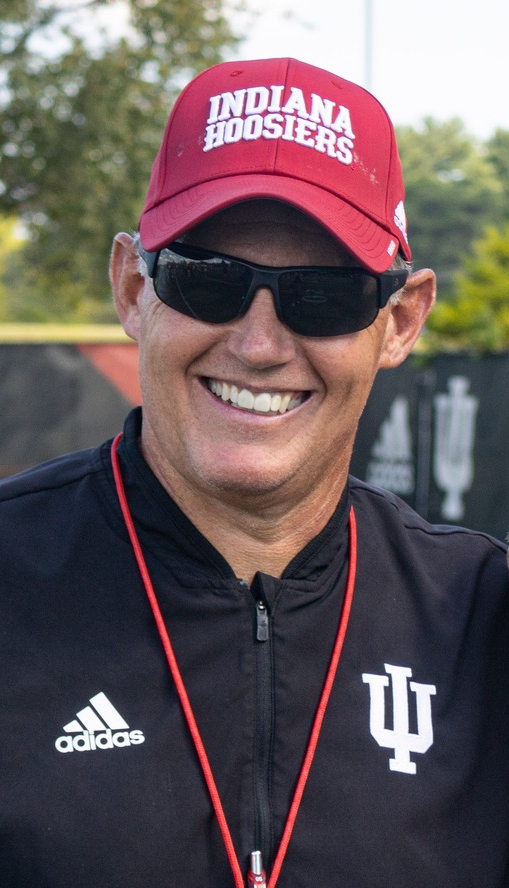
- Allen in 2022

Current position
- Title: Defensive coordinator & linebackers coach
- Team: Clemson
- Conference: ACC

Biographical details
- Born: March 14, 1970 (age 56); New Castle, Indiana, U.S.
- Education: Maranatha Baptist University (1992); Indiana University Bloomington (2002)

Playing career
- 1988–1991: Maranatha Baptist

Coaching career (HC unless noted)
- 1992: Temple Heights HS (FL) (DC)
- 1993: Temple Heights HS (FL) (interim HC/DC)
- 1994: Temple Heights HS (FL)
- 1995–1996: Armwood HS (FL) (DC)
- 1997: Marion HS (IN) (DC)
- 1998–2003: Ben Davis HS (IN) (DC)
- 2004–2006: Ben Davis HS (IN)
- 2007: Wabash (ST/DB)
- 2008–2009: Lambuth (AHC/DC/LB)
- 2010: Drake (DC/LB)
- 2011: Arkansas State (AHC)
- 2012–2014: Ole Miss (ST/LB)
- 2015: South Florida (DC)
- 2016: Indiana (AHC/DC)
- 2017–2023: Indiana
- 2024: Penn State (DC/LB)
- 2025–present: Clemson (DC/LB)

Head coaching record
- Overall: 33–49 (college)
- Bowls: 0–3

Accomplishments and honors

Awards
- AFCA Coach of the Year Award (2020); Big Ten Coach of the Year (2020)

Thomas E. Allen (born March 14, 1970) is an American college football coach who is the defensive coordinator at Clemson University. He previously served as the head coach at Indiana from 2017 to 2023, and was the defensive coordinator at Penn State for the 2024 season. He was named the 2020 Big Ten Coach of the Year and AFCA Coach of the Year.

Prior to his tenure at Pennsylvania State University, Allen previously served as an assistant coach at Indiana University Bloomington, the University of South Florida, University of Mississippi (Ole Miss), Arkansas State University, Drake University, Lambuth University and Wabash College. A native of New Castle, Indiana, Allen also spent six seasons as defensive coordinator and three seasons as the head football coach at Ben Davis High School in Indianapolis.

== Early life and education ==
Allen played high school football at New Castle High School in New Castle, Indiana, where his father (also named Tom Allen) was the head football coach. While in high school, Allen also competed in shot put and wrestling. After high school, he attended Maranatha Baptist University, where he participated in football and wrestling.

== Coaching career ==
=== High school ===
Following their college graduation from Maranatha Baptist University, Allen and his wife moved to Florida, where both began teaching. Allen's first coaching job was with Temple Heights Christian School in Tampa, Florida, as defensive coordinator. Allen started in 1992; he took over as head coach during the 1993 season after the resignation of Steve Lewis, who remained the athletic director. In 1994, his only full season as Temple Heights head coach, Allen went 8–3 and lead his team to their first playoff appearance since 1976. Allen was a finalist for the Hillsborough County coach of the year award. The following year, Allen left to become defensive coordinator at Armwood High School in nearby Seffner, Florida.

In 1997, following two years at Armwood, Allen moved back to his native Indiana to become defensive coordinator at Marion High School in Marion, Indiana. Under Allen, Marion's allowed points-per-game dropped from 29 to 16.6. After just one year at Marion, Allen took the defensive coordinator job at Ben Davis High School in Indianapolis. The head coach at Ben Davis was Dick Dullaghan, whom Allen had come to know through the former's football camps in Lakeland, Florida. Dullaghan retired after the 2003 season and Allen succeeded him as head coach. Allen coached Ben Davis from 2004 to 2006. In those three seasons, his teams were 25–12 overall. Following the 2006 season, Allen moved up to the college coaching ranks, accepting an assistant coach job at Wabash College.

=== Wabash ===
At Wabash in 2007, Allen coached defensive backs and special teams. Wabash competed in the North Coast Athletic Conference of NCAA Division III. Its head coach, Chris Creighton, was in the final year of a successful seven-year tenure. Following the 2007 season, Creighton left to become head coach at Drake University.

=== Lambuth ===
From 2008 through 2009, Allen joined the coaching staff of incoming head coach Hugh Freeze at Lambuth University in Jackson, Tennessee, as defensive coordinator. Freeze would be there for two years before leaving to become offensive coordinator at San Jose State University (and later Arkansas State University), departing after the 2009 season. Allen and defensive backs coach Ron Dickerson were internal candidates to succeed Freeze. Lambuth, which would shut down within a year, hired Dickerson, and Allen departed to become defensive coordinator at Drake.

=== Drake ===
At Drake in 2010, he was reunited with Creighton, now entering his third year there. Allen succeeded Neal Neathery, who had left to become defensive coordinator at the University of Texas at San Antonio. Allen left after the season to rejoin Hugh Freeze, who had been promoted to head coach at Arkansas State.

=== Arkansas State ===
In 2011, Allen served as the assistant head coach at Arkansas State, his first position with a Division I FBS program. The head coach during this time was Hugh Freeze, who Allen had previously coached with at Lambuth University. After the end of the regular season, Allen followed Freeze to Ole Miss after Freeze was hired to be the head coach of the Rebels. In his sole season with the Red Wolves, they went 10–2.

=== Ole Miss ===
From 2012 to 2014, Allen spent three seasons as the linebackers coach and special teams coordinator at Ole Miss under head coach Hugh Freeze. During his time in Oxford, the Rebels went 24–15 and consistently ranked near the top of the FBS in terms of tackles for loss and sacks. Prior to his arrival, Ole Miss had ranked last in the SEC in total defense.

=== South Florida ===
On December 17, 2014, Allen was named defensive coordinator at South Florida under third-year head coach Willie Taggart. In his lone season in Tampa, Allen's defensive unit ranked first in the American Athletic Conference (AAC) in scoring defense at just 19.6 points per conference game. His efforts also saw the team's defense rank high nationally, tying for 13th nationally in tackles for loss (7.5 per game), 14th in interceptions (17), 24th in takeaways (25), 26th in sacks (2.62 per game), 31st in rushing defense (141.4 ypg), 34th in passing efficiency defense (118.76), and 35th in scoring defense (22.9 ppg). Allen was considered a candidate for the defensive coordinator position at Auburn following then-defensive coordinator Will Muschamp's departure in December 2015, but the vacant position was ultimately filled by Kevin Steele.

=== Indiana ===
Allen was hired on January 15, 2016, to serve as defensive coordinator on head coach Kevin Wilson's staff at Indiana. In replacing previous defensive coordinator Brian Knorr, Allen took over a defense that ranked #120 in the FBS in total defense and #106 in opponent points scored. After just one season, Allen engineered one of the top defensive turnarounds in the country with the team improving in every major statistical category against a schedule featuring four top-10 opponents, a program first. The Hoosiers were the most improved team nationally in total defense (-169.4 ypg) and passing defense (-134.1 ypg), the sixth-most improved in third-down defense (-12.2 percent) and the ninth-most improved in points per game allowed (-12.3 ypg).

On December 1, 2016, Indiana athletic director Fred Glass named Allen head coach after Wilson's sudden resignation, forcing Allen to make his coaching debut during the team's final game of the season at the 2016 Foster Farms Bowl. His contract guaranteed him $1.795 million annually — $500,000 per year in base pay, plus $1.295 million per year in outside, marketing, and promotional income. This made Allen the lowest-paid head coach in the Big Ten, although various bonuses could take his total compensation above $3 million.

Allen quickly elevated Indiana's recruiting posture. During his first two seasons as head coach, a school-record number of players earned conference honors and a school record were drafted or invited to NFL camps. The 2019 signing class was the highest-rated in program history, besting his previous top-ranked class of 2018, and the two classes combined constituting 80 of the team's 115-man roster. In 2019, Allen's third season, he led Indiana to its first 7–2 start since 1993, the last season Indiana won eight games. That season Indiana earned a #24 ranking in the Associated Press and #25 ranking in the coaches poll, the team's first top 25 ranking in football since 1994. His 18 wins over his first three seasons were the most for an Indiana coach in the post-World War II era. Indiana finished the regular season with an 8–4 record, its first eight-win since 1993, and its 5-4 Big Ten record its first winning conference record since 1993. Following the regular season, Allen and the school agreed to a new seven-year contract with an average annual compensation of $3.9 million.

Indiana's first game of the 2020 season took place at Memorial Stadium on October 24, 2020, against the #8 Penn State Nittany Lions. The Hoosiers defeated Penn State 36–35 in overtime. The Hoosiers were awarded a ranking of #17 following the victory. Indiana's next two games included a 37–21 victory over the Rutgers Scarlet Knights and a 38–21 victory over the #23 Michigan Wolverines, their first victory over them in 33 years. Following the win versus the Wolverines, the Hoosiers were ranked tenth in both the AP and coaches poll, their highest rankings since 1969 and 1992. Indiana finished the 2020 regular season 6-1 (shortened by the COVID-19 pandemic), ranked seventh in the AP poll, eighth in the coaches poll, and 11th in the CFP rankings and earned a bid in the Outback Bowl, where they lost to Ole Miss, 20–26. Following the culmination of the season, Allen would be named the 2020 Big Ten Coach of the Year, as well as the AFCA Coach of the Year.

Allen's 2021 Indiana team was ranked 17th to begin the 2021 season, but hobbled by injuries, the team quickly fell out of the rankings after a 34–6 loss to Iowa in their first game of the season. The team finished the season 2–10 and went 0–9 in Big Ten play. Immediately following Indiana's last game of the season, offensive coordinator Nick Sheridan was fired and Allen took a $200,000 pay cut to help pay for the firing. Allen stated "this season was not acceptable and we will work to address it."

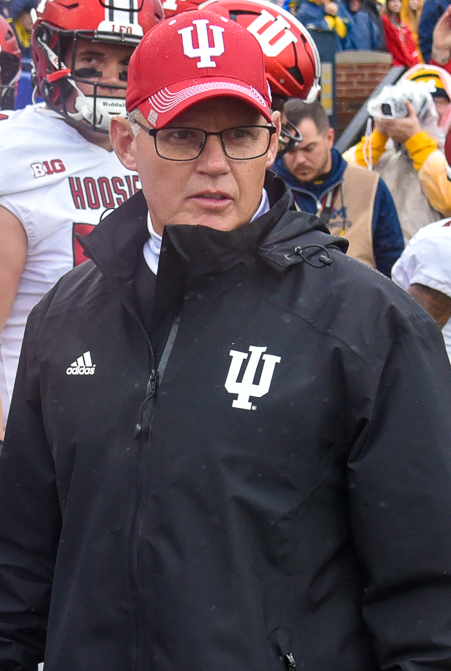
Allen in 2023

The 2022 season began following a major off-season overhaul. More than 30 seniors and juniors had departed and the team added 13 players from the transfer portal, along with five new assistant coaches, two new coordinators, and Allen himself returning as the defensive play-caller for the first time since 2018. The 2022 recruiting class was the best of Allen's tenure and "arguably the best Indiana has signed in the era of class rankings." The Hoosiers, however, went 4–8, failing to qualify for a bowl game for the 2nd straight year under Allen.

The 2023 season began with low expectations for the Hoosiers. The offense switched to the option, which they had used towards the end of the 2022 season. The season began with a 23–3 loss at home to the #4 Ohio State Buckeyes. Indiana fired Allen after the conclusion of the 2023 season, in which the team posted a 3–9 record. Allen's overall record at Indiana was 33–49.

=== Penn State ===
On December 19, 2023, Allen was hired to be the defensive coordinator and linebackers coach at Penn State University under head coach James Franklin, replacing Manny Diaz after his departure to become head coach at Duke University.

=== Clemson ===
After Penn State lost to Notre Dame in the Orange Bowl, Clemson announced the hiring of Allen as defensive coordinator on January 14. 2025.

== Personal life ==
Allen is a Christian and a supporter of the Fellowship of Christian Athletes.

Allen is married to Tracy Allen. They have one son and two daughters together. His son Thomas attended Indiana University and played as a linebacker for Allen and the Hoosiers from 2018 to 2021.

== Head coaching record ==
=== College ===
Year	Team	Overall	Conference	Standing	Bowl/playoffs	Coaches^{#}	AP^{°}
Indiana Hoosiers (Big Ten Conference) (2016–2023)
2016	Indiana	0–1	0–0	4th (East)	L Foster Farms		
2017	Indiana	5–7	2–7	7th (East)			
2018	Indiana	5–7	2–7	6th (East)			
2019	Indiana	8–5	5–4	4th (East)	L Gator		
2020	Indiana	6–2	6–1	2nd (East)	L Outback	13	12
2021	Indiana	2–10	0–9	7th (East)			
2022	Indiana	4–8	2–7	6th (East)			
2023	Indiana	3–9	1–8	7th (East)			
Indiana:		33–49	18–43				
Total:		33–49					
