= Memorial Stadium (Indiana University) =

Stadium in Bloomington, Indiana

- The Rock
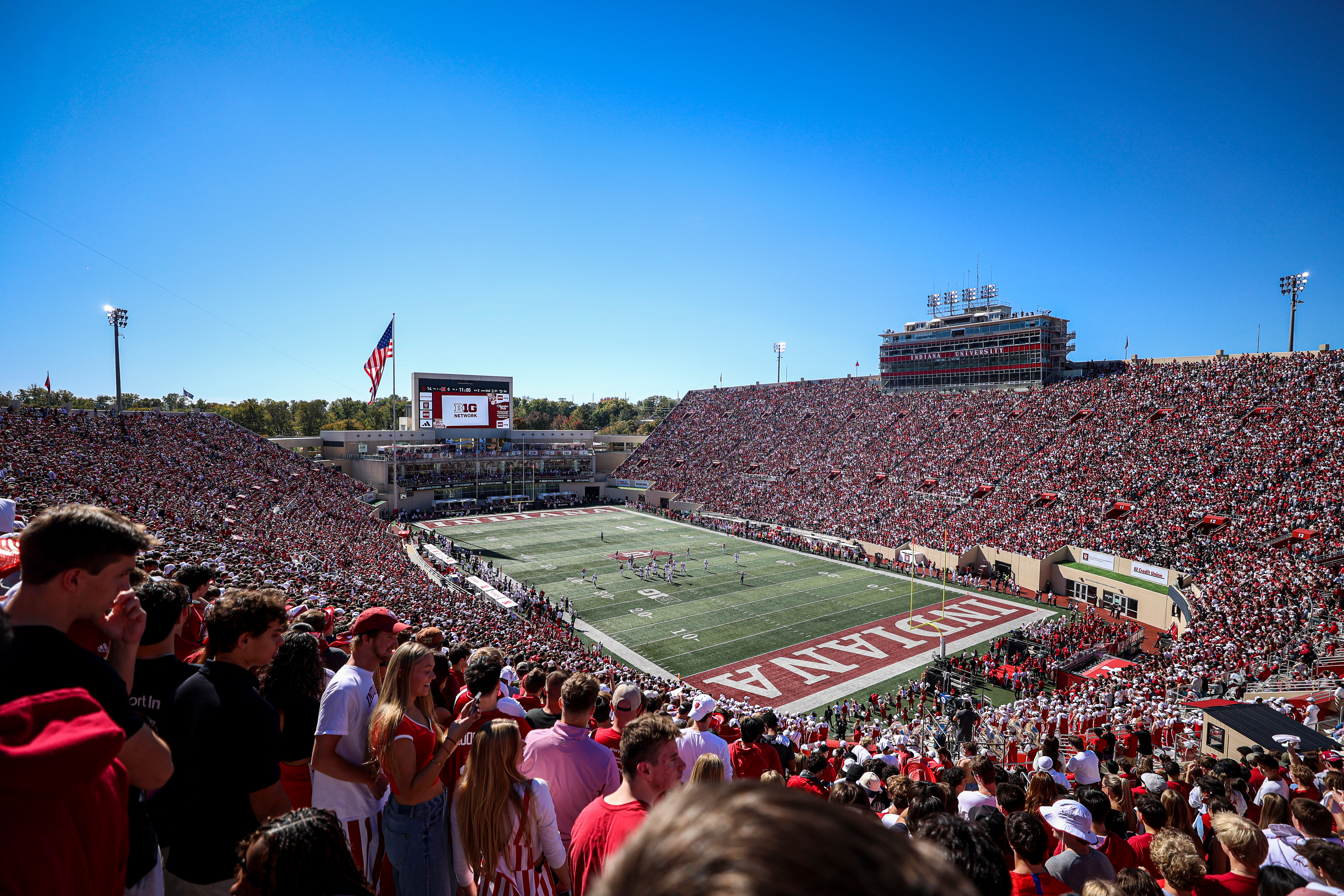
- Memorial Stadium in October 2024
- Interactive map of Memorial Stadium
- Former names: Seventeenth Street Football Stadium (1960–1971)
- Location: 701 East 17th Street; Bloomington, Indiana, US 47408
- Coordinates: 39°10′51″N 86°31′32″W
- Owner: Indiana University Bloomington
- Operator: Indiana University Bloomington
- Capacity: 53,524 (2025–present) Former capacity List: 53,082 (2024); 52,626 (2018-2023); 52,929 (2010–2017); 52,692 (2009); 49,225 (2007–2008); 52,180 (2003–2006); 52,324 (1969–2002); 48,344 (1960–1968)
- Surface: Hellas Matrix Helix (2025–present); FieldTurf (2008–2024); AstroPlay (2003–2007); AstroTurf (1986–1997); Artificial turf (1970–1985); Natural grass (1960–1969, 1998–2002)
- Record attendance: 56,223 (Indiana vs Purdue, November 12, 1969)

Construction
- Groundbreaking: August 27, 1958
- Opened: October 8, 1960
- Renovated: 2003, 2016
- Expanded: 1969, 2009
- Cost: $4.569 million ($49.7 million in 2025 dollars)
- Architect: Eggers & Higgins
- General contractor: Huber, Hunt & Nichols, Inc.

Tenant
- Indiana Hoosiers football (NCAA) (1960–present)

Website
- iuhoosiers.com/memorial-stadium

Memorial Stadium (officially known as Merchants Bank Field at Memorial Stadium for sponsorship reasons) is an American football stadium in Bloomington, Indiana, United States. It is primarily used for football, and has been the home of Indiana Hoosiers football since its opening in 1960. It is the 14th largest football stadium in the Big Ten Conference, with an official capacity of 53,524.

== History ==
The stadium officially opened in 1960 as Seventeenth Street Football Stadium, replacing the original Memorial Stadium, a 20,000-seat stadium located on 10th Street in what is now Indiana University's Arboretum. It was renamed in 1971 as part of a ceremony to transfer the name from the older stadium, which was then renamed Tenth Street Stadium. The name honors "the sons and daughters of Indiana University who have served in the wars of the republic." The current Memorial Stadium has been renovated or updated multiple times since the original construction. Improvements include the replacement of the original wooden seats with aluminum bleachers, installation of sound and lighting systems, and major structural overhauls.

In 2019, the $8.5 million Terry Tallen Indiana Football Complex opened, after J.C. Ripberger Construction Corp was able to finish the project in only 6 months, including an expanded and renovated locker room area, training room and sports lounge, to allow players to get acquainted with video games on 98" televisions.

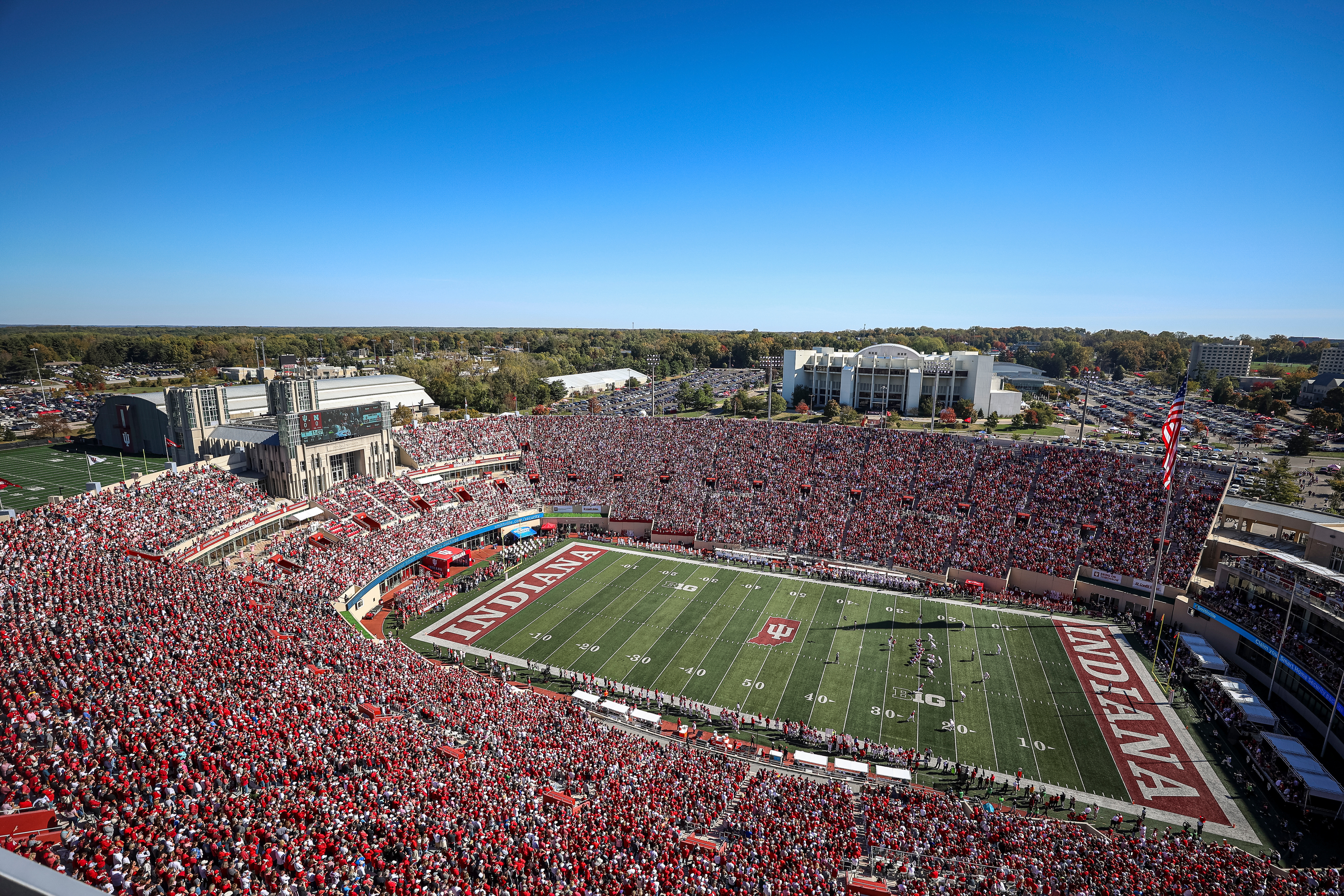
The east stand and North End Zone Development Center, as seen from the west stand. Assembly Hall is beyond the east stand.

In September 2006, Indiana University announced plans to expand Memorial Stadium and enclose the north end zone. Demolition of the North End Zone bleachers took place in January 2007. This left capacity for the 2007 and 2008 seasons at 49,225.

The expansion provides additional space for classrooms, a 25,000 sq ft (2,300 m^{2}) weight/training room, a Hall of Fame, and expanded seating for football, raising the stadium's seating capacity to 52,692. The expansion is part of an overall $55 million expansion of several Indiana University athletic facilities. The project was completed as scheduled in August 2009, and was ready for the Hoosiers when they opened against Eastern Kentucky on September 3, 2009.

Indiana Athletic Director Fred Glass announced in July 2009 $3 million of additional renovations to the stadium for the 2009 season, including a new "retro" North End Zone scoreboard, a "Knothole Park" kids area in the south end zone, upgrades to the press box, repainting walkways, renovated concession stands, additional ticket booths, and new fencing around the stadium.

A 36-by-91-foot (11 by 28 m) HD scoreboard from Daktronics was added to the South End Zone for the 2010 season (which was the 29th largest collegiate scoreboard in the country), along with a state-of-the-art sound system.

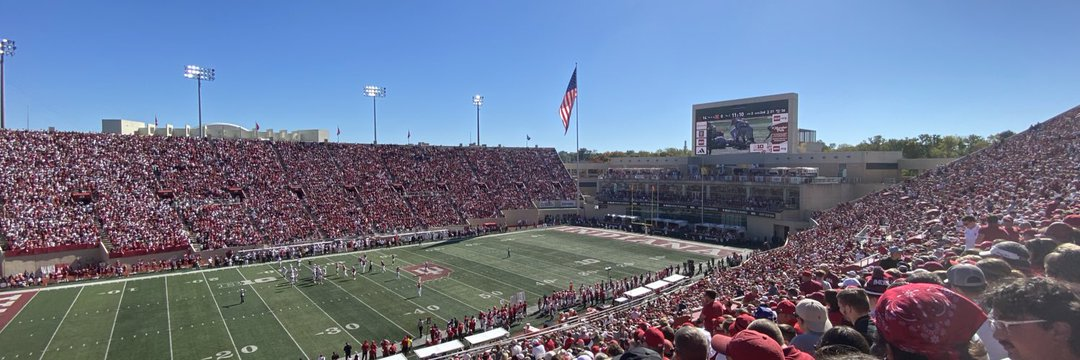
The South End Zone Excellence Center, as seen from the west stand of the stadium.

Indiana University Athletic Director Fred Glass announced on October 9, 2014, a planned project to enclose the south end of Memorial Stadium at an estimated cost of $10 million. The project included: a new rehabilitation and treatment facility for athletes, additional academic and life skills support facilities, a "multi-use" outdoor terrace on the roof of the structure, an entry plaza and green space at the south end of the stadium. The project was confirmed in March 2016, and was completed for the 2018 season. The total cost was $53 million. A new 20-by-68-foot (6.1 m × 20.7 m) video board was installed in the North End Zone for the 2017 season, with a 42-by-91.3-foot (12.8 m × 27.8 m) video board installed prior to the 2018 season, in the completed south end zone.

On August 21, 2025, naming rights to the playing surface inside Memorial Stadium were sold to Merchants Bank.

=== USS Indiana prow, mast, and guns ===
The prow, mainmast, and two guns of the USS Indiana are erected at the western entrance of the stadium. The mainmast and guns were donated by the U.S. Navy in 1966, while they were joined by the prow in 2013. The battleship saw extensive service in the Pacific Theater during World War II, taking part in the invasion of the Gilbert Islands, Marshall Islands, Marianas campaign, and the Battle of Iwo Jima and earning nine battle stars.

=== Hep's Rock ===
In 2005 head football coach Terry Hoeppner had a southern Indiana limestone boulder, nicknamed "The Rock", installed in the north end zone as a new campus tradition. This limestone boulder was found prior to Hoeppner's first season at IU in the practice field. It was removed, put on a granite slab and moved to the stadium. The Hoosiers and coach Hoeppner walked out and touched the Rock before running onto the field at every home game during Hoeppner's time as head coach. Terry Hoeppner died of brain cancer on June 19, 2007, and The Rock (renamed "Hep's Rock" during a ceremony with the Hoeppner family on November 6, 2010) now serves as motivation for the team as well as a tribute to Hoeppner's influence on the football program. The Rock was relocated to the East Concourse of Memorial Stadium before the 2024 season.

== Playing surface ==
The field at the stadium was originally natural grass, but this was replaced in 1970 with artificial turf, which was updated to AstroTurf in 1986. The AstroTurf was replaced with grass in 1998 , but the field soon reverted to an artificial surface (AstroPlay) in 2003. Heavy rains in June 2008 severely damaged the field, washing away the gravel substrate and creating a large sinkhole in the south end zone, which led to the installation of a FieldTurf surface. A new FieldTurf Revolution 360 playing surface was installed prior to the 2016 season. This was replaced with the current Hellas Matrix Helix surface for the 2025 season.

== Largest attendance ==
Rank	Attendance	Date	Result
1	56,223	November 12, 1969	Indiana 21 – Purdue 44
2	56,088	September 20, 2025	Indiana 63 – Illinois 10
3	55,165	October 18, 2025	Indiana 38 – Michigan State 13
4	55,042	November 15, 2025	Indiana 31 – Wisconsin 7
5	54,867	October 25, 2025	Indiana 56 – UCLA 6
6	54,695	September 19, 2026	Indiana 38 – Western Kentucky 0
7	54,593	September 25, 2026	Indiana 29 – Northwestern 23
8	54,493	September 5, 2026	Indiana 52 – North Texas 16
9	54,376	September 12, 2026	Indiana 55 – Howard 0
10	53,202	November 18, 1979	Indiana 21 – Purdue 37

== See also ==
- List of NCAA Division I FBS football stadiums
