= Exposition Building =

The Exposition Building is either of the following:

- Industrial Exposition Building in Minneapolis, 1886–1940, site of the 1892 Republican National Convention
- St. Louis Exposition and Music Hall, 1883–1907
