= New Castle Commercial Historic District =

Historic district in Indiana, United States

- U.S. National Register of Historic Places
- U.S. Historic district
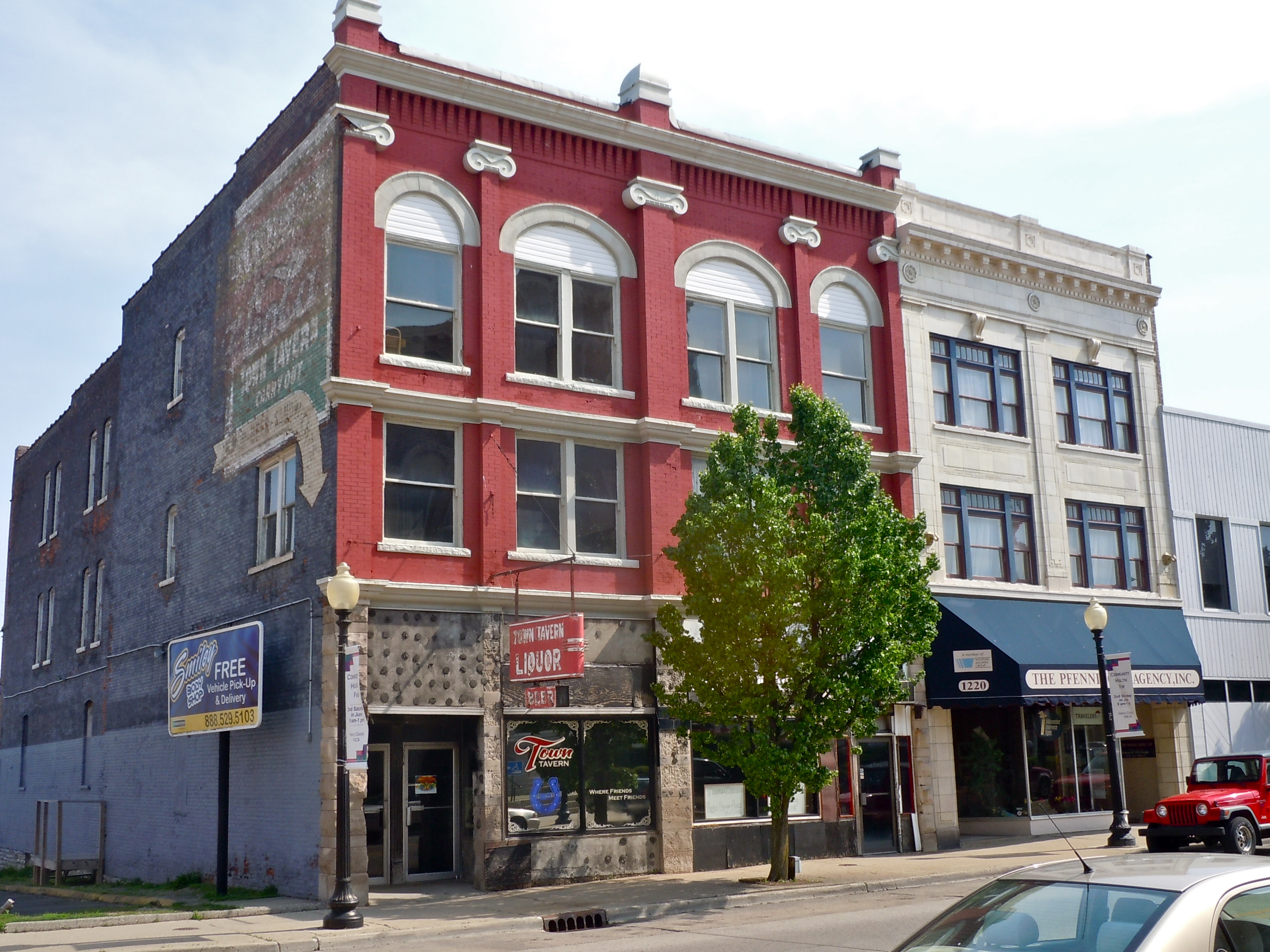
- New Castle Commercial Historic District, May 2011

- Location within Indiana Location within the United States
- Location: Roughly bounded by Fleming and 11 Sts., Central Ave. and the Norfolk & Western RR tracks, New Castle, Indiana
- Coordinates: 39°55′53″N 85°22′12″W
- Area: 18 acres (7.3 ha)
- Architect: Hodgson, Isaac
- Architectural style: Classical Revival, Italianate, Commercial Style
- NRHP reference No.: 91001868
- Added to NRHP: December 19, 1991

The New Castle Commercial Historic District is a national historic district located at New Castle, Indiana. It encompasses 64 contributing buildings in the central business district of New Castle. It developed between about the 1849 and 1941, and includes many excellent examples of Italianate, Classical Revival, and Commercial styles of architecture. Notable sites of interest include the separately listed Henry County Courthouse. Other notable buildings include the L.A. Jennings Building (1877), Odd Fellows Hall (1875, c. 1895), Murphey Building (c. 1870), Knights of Pythias Building (1891), Masonic Temple (1892), Bradway Building (1902), former United Brethren Church (1863, 1883), Citizens State Bank Building (1923), S.P. Jennings and Sons Handle Factory complex (c. 1890), and Coca-Cola Bottling Building (1905, 1941).

It was added to the National Register of Historic Places in 1991.
