= Isaac Hodgson (architect) =

Irish architect

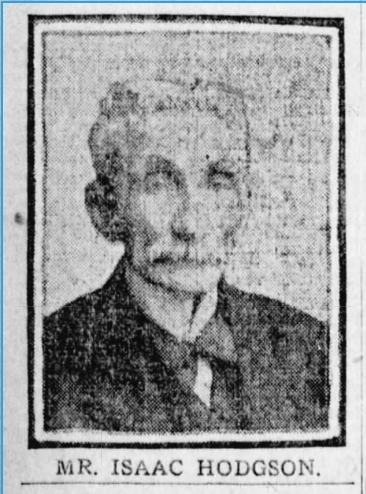
- File:Isaac Hodgson, Star Tribune, 1902
- Born: 16 December 1826; Belfast, Ireland
- Died: August, 1909; Minneapolis, MN
- Occupation: Architect
- Buildings: Bartholomew County Courthouse; Jennings County Courthouse; Morgan County Courthouse; Henry County Courthouse

Isaac Hodgson (16 December 1826 – August, 1909) was an Irish architect who worked primarily in Indiana and Minnesota.

== Life and education ==
He was born in Belfast, Ireland in 1826 and studied at the Royal Academy. He went to work for architect Sir Charles Lanyon at the age of 16. He immigrated to the New York in 1848 and in 1849 moved to Louisville, Kentucky where he worked as an assistant architect working on a number of state governmental buildings. He died in Indiana in August 1909 (Encyclopaedia of Indianapolis has an incorrect date and it must have come from a previous incorrect source.)

== Career ==
He was practicing architecture in Indianapolis by 1855. He designed six Indiana courthouses, including the ones in Bartholomew, Jennings, Morgan and Henry counties. He also designed the old Marion County courthouse which was demolished in 1962.

Hodgson was one of eight charter members of the Indiana Chapter of the American Institute of Architects and relocated to Minnesota about 1882 where he designed a number of notable buildings in partnership with his oldest son, including the Industrial Exposition Building in 1886.

== Notable works ==
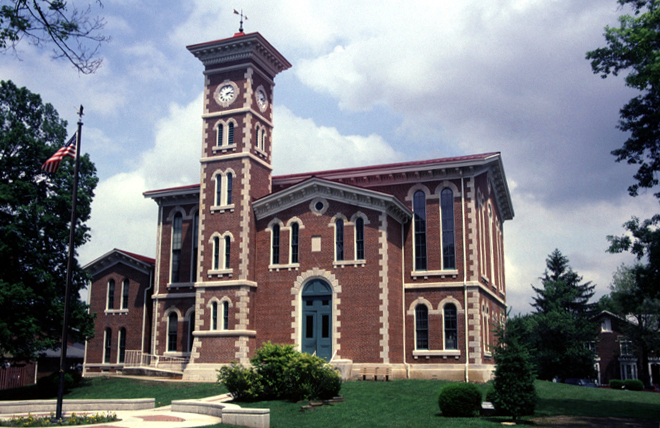
Jennings County Courthouse

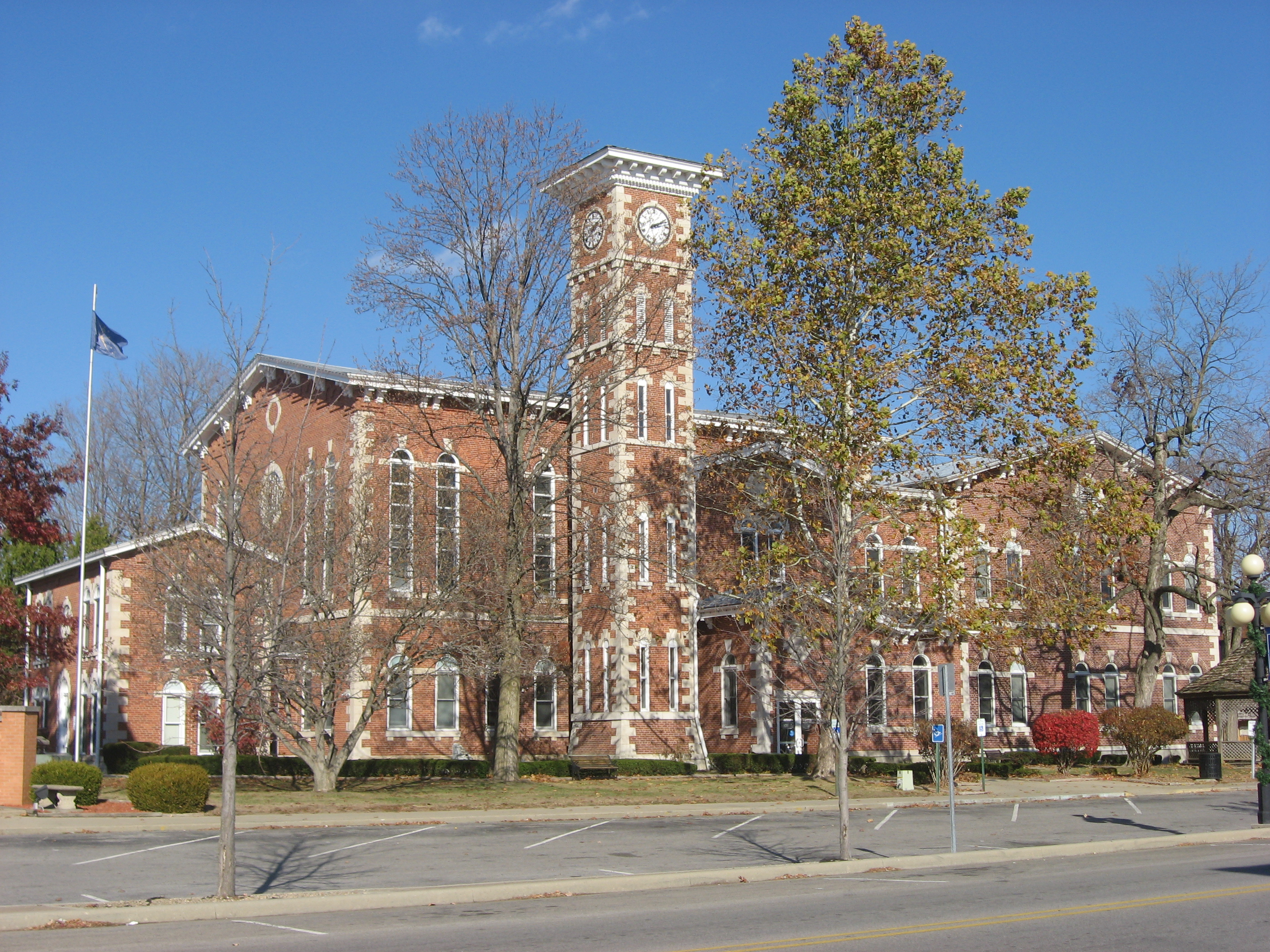
Morgan County Courthouse

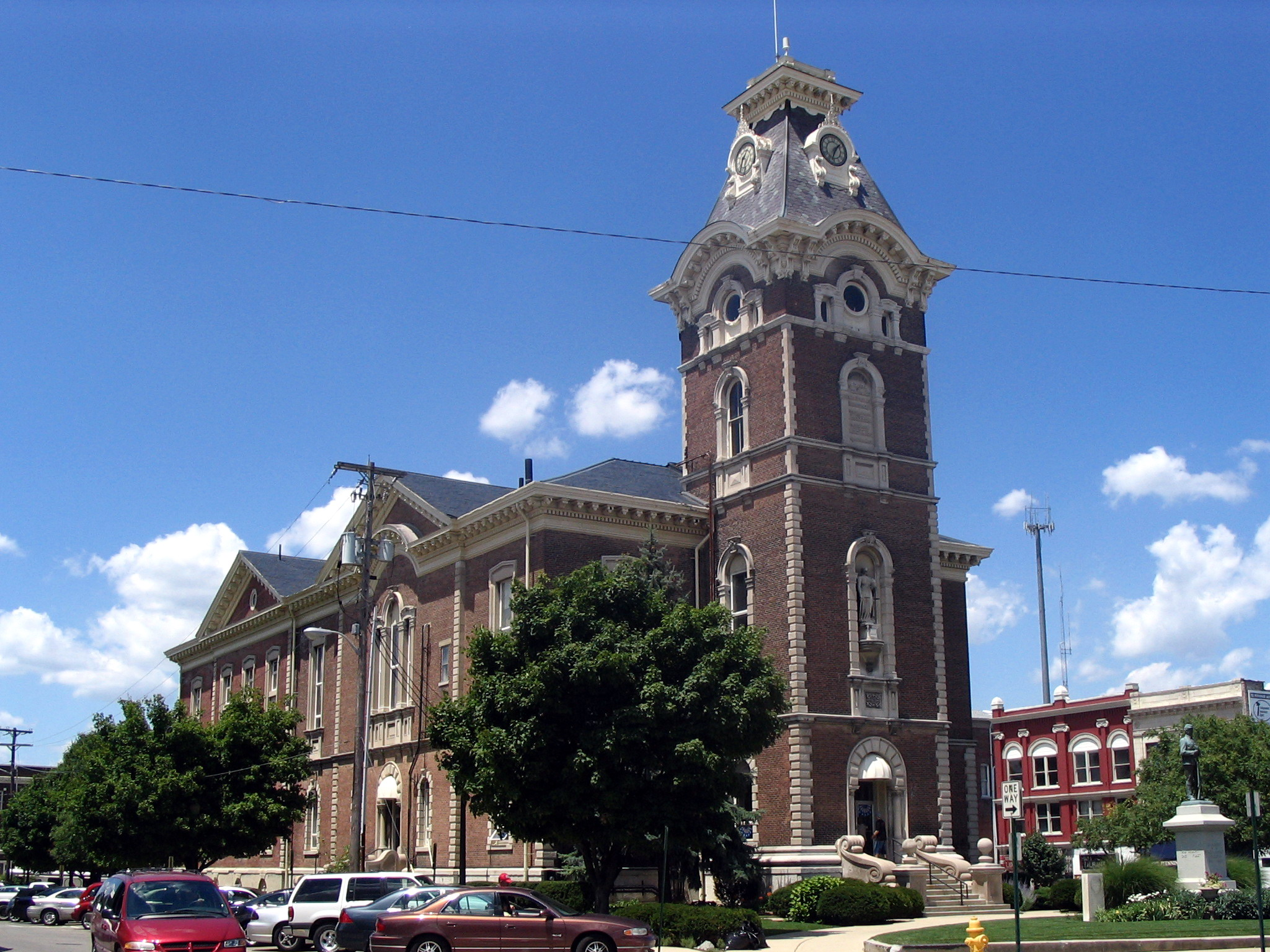
Henry County Courthouse

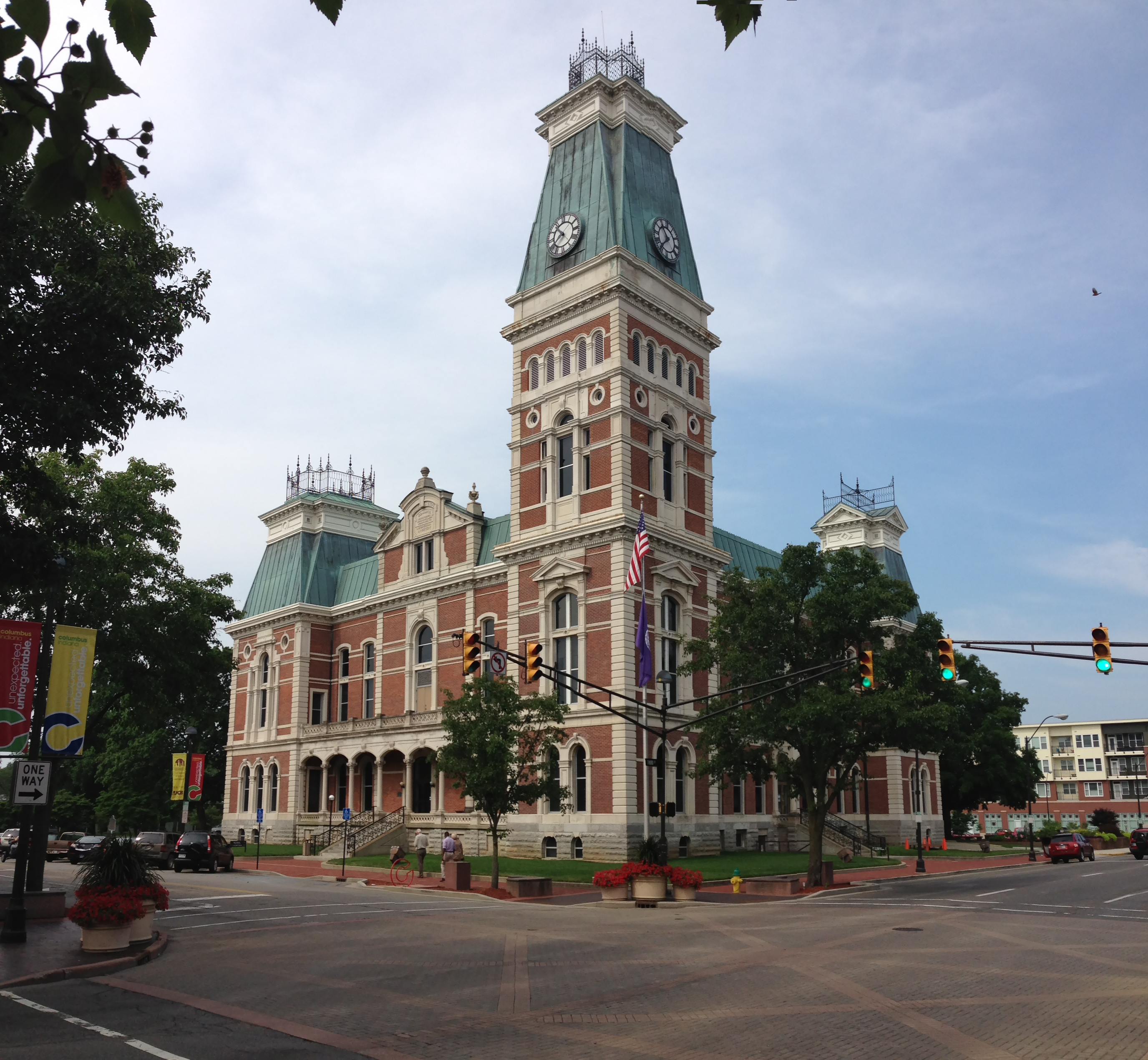
Bartholomew County Courthouse
