= William Grose =

American politician

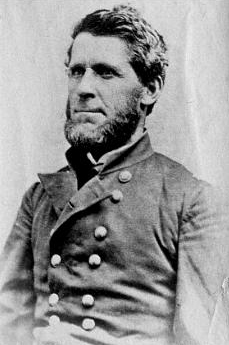
- William Grose
- Born: December 16, 1812; Dayton, Ohio
- Died: July 30, 1900 (aged 87); New Castle, Indiana
- Burial place: South Mound Cemetery, New Castle, Indiana
- Military career
- Allegiance: United States of America; Union
- Branch: United States Army; Union Army
- Rank: Brigadier General
- Conflicts: American Civil War; Battle of Shiloh; Battle of Perryville; Battle of Stones River; Tullahoma Campaign; Battle of Chickamauga; Battle of Lookout Mountain; Atlanta campaign; Franklin-Nashville Campaign

William Grose (December 16, 1812 – July 30, 1900) was a lawyer, politician, writer, and brigadier general in the Union Army during the American Civil War. He served in many of the important campaigns and battles of the Western Theater, earning a reputation for being "always seen where the bullets flew thickest."

== Early life and career ==
Grose was born in Dayton, Ohio, to a family with strong military ties. His father had served in the United States Army under William Henry Harrison against the British Army in the War of 1812 and his grandfather Jacob Grose had been killed in the American Revolution. In the spring of 1813, Grose's family moved to Fayette County, Indiana, and then to Henry County in 1829. He worked as a youth as a farm laborer and in a local brickyard. Grose studied law in New Castle, Indiana, where he lived the rest of his life. He passed the bar exam in 1842 and established a successful law practice and unsuccessfully ran for the United States Congress in 1852 as a Democrat. Switching political parties, in 1856 he was a delegate to the Republican National Convention, supporting John C. Fremont's unsuccessful candidacy for President of the United States. He was elected in 1860 as a judge of the local common pleas court.

== Civil War ==
With the outbreak of the Civil War, Grose was appointed colonel of the 36th Indiana Infantry in October 1861, a regiment he recruited and trained. He led the regiment during the Battle of Shiloh, where his horse was shot from under him and he was slightly wounded in the shoulder. Shortly afterwards, he replaced the wounded Brig. Gen. Jacob Ammen in command of a brigade of infantry in the Army of the Cumberland under Maj. Gen. Don Carlos Buell. He participated in numerous campaigns and battles, including the pursuit of Braxton Bragg's army in the Kentucky Campaign, having another horse killed at the Battle of Stones River. In 1863, he fought in the Tullahoma Campaign and the Battle of Chickamauga, where he was wounded in the neck. He and his men performed well during the Chattanooga Campaign in late 1863, taking part in the assault on Lookout Mountain and received praise in the official reports of the battle.

During the Atlanta Campaign of 1864, Grose commanded 3rd Brigade, Maj. Gen. David S. Stanley's First Division, IV Corps (Maj. Gen. Oliver Otis Howard), Army of the Cumberland, commanded by Major General George Henry Thomas. Grose's performance garnered a brigadier general of volunteers promotion, dated from 30 July 1864. Grose's brigade remained with the IV Corps, commanded by Maj. Gen. Thomas J. Wood, Army of the Cumberland for the pursuit of the Army of Tennessee under Lt. Gen. John Bell Hood and fought in the Franklin-Nashville Campaign, where Hood's army was virtually destroyed. Grose was brevetted as a major general in August 1865 while serving on administrative duty on a court-martial of a fellow officer.

== Postbellum ==
Grose remained on active duty until he resigned his commission on 31 January 1866, to return to his law practice at New Castle, Indiana. President Andrew Johnson appointed him as the collector of internal revenue taxes for his region, a post he held until 1874. Interested in social improvement, Grose took a position on the Indiana commission that oversaw the construction of mental hospitals. In 1878, he was narrowly defeated in a bid for a Congressional seat. In 1887, Grose returned to politics, successfully campaigning for a seat in the Indiana State Senate. In 1891, he authored the regimental history of the 36th Indiana Infantry and actively participated in its veterans reunions.

Grose died at the age of 87 on 30 July 1900 in his home in New Castle, Indiana, and was buried in South Mound Cemetery. The Gen. William Grose House in New Castle is the home of the Henry County Historical Society and open to the public.

== See also ==
- List of American Civil War generals (Union)
