= New Castle High School (Indiana) =

Public school in Indiana, United States

Location
- 801 Parkview Drive; New Castle, Henry County, Indiana 47362; United States; 39°54′43″N 85°22′38″W

Information
- Former name: New Castle Chrysler High School
- Type: Public
- Motto: Non Pro Schola Sed Pro Vita (Not For School But For Life)
- Established: 1895
- School board: Indiana Board of Education
- School district: New Castle Community School Corporation
- Superintendent: Matthew Shoemaker
- Principal: Kim Nicholson
- Teaching staff: 72.00 (FTE)
- Grades: 9–12
- Enrollment: 828 (2024–2025)
- Student to teacher ratio: 11.50
- Colors: Green and white
- Athletics: Eastern Crossroads Conference
- Sports: Baseball Basketball B/G Cross Country B/G Football Golf B/G Soccer B/G Softball Tennis B/G Track & Field B/G Volleyball B/G Wrestling B/G
- Team name: Trojans
- Newspaper: NC Phoenix
- Yearbook: Rosennial
- Website: https://www.nccsc.k12.in.us/o/nchs
- Last updated: 06/07/2026

New Castle High School is a public high school in New Castle, Indiana whose name is commonly abbreviated to NCHS. It is part of the New Castle Community School Corporation and has an enrollment of approximately 900 students. NCHS is the largest high school in Henry County.

The present high school originated from the New Castle Academy in 1870. In 1895, New Castle High School was constructed. Because of its distinctive appearance, the building became known as "The Castle." In response to a significant increase in enrollment, a new senior high school was constructed in 1923–24 at 14th and Walnut Streets. Plans to construct an additional wing and a multi-purpose facility were never developed. Instead, physical education classes were conducted at the National Guard Armory across the street and basketball games were played at the YMCA in the "Church Street Gym." The Walnut Street location served as the senior high school until 1958 when the present high school facility was completed. The 1924 structure then joined the 1895 "Castle" building as a junior high school. In 1973, eighth and ninth grade students began attending the newly constructed Parkview Junior High School. The "Castle" was subsequently demolished, and the Walnut Street school exclusively housed seventh grade students until 1999. The location was home to the Raintree Education Center until 2010; the building was sold to a private owner in 2011.

== Present location ==
Located just west of Finn S. at the corner of Parkview Drive and Ross Street, the current facility opened in August 1958. The structure was modern for its era and featured an expansive facade of windows on the north and south sides. Two new cafeterias, a business wing, and a vocational wing were in place by the 1960s. Construction of Bundy Auditorium in 1972 as part of the adjoining Parkview Junior High School provided a place for school events and activities. A new swimming facility was put into use at this time.

When the current building opened, the school was renamed Walter P. Chrysler Memorial High School, after Chrysler Corporation founder Walter Chrysler. In 1979, the New Castle School Board voted to remove the Chrysler name from the school, but eventually decided to rename it New Castle Chrysler High School. The Chrysler name was eventually dropped from the school, but not until July 1, 2011. The name change had been approved by a 3–2 vote on November 12, 2007, restoring the school's original name, effective after that year's freshman class graduated in 2011.

The New Castle School Board began a $25 million project in 1998 to significantly renovate the high school, add air conditioning, and upgrade its technological infrastructure. The former business wing, or "C" wing, was demolished to make room for a new entrance and improved parking. A new three-story academic wing was built to provide more classroom space and improved science facilities. In 1999, freshmen students were moved from Parkview Junior High School to the newly expanded high school.

During the summer of 2011, most of the vocational (New Castle Area Career) programs that had been formerly housed at the Eder site in Knightstown (Indiana Soldiers' and Sailors' Children's Home campus) were moved primarily into the E and T-wings of New Castle High School. Only the student radio station, WKPW (90.7 FM), remained in Knightstown where it had been moved from the Eder site to Knightstown High School by early 2010.

== Athletics ==
New Castle High School is a member of the Hoosier Heritage Conference and has programs in football, soccer, cross country, volleyball, tennis, basketball, gymnastics, wrestling, swimming, track, golf, softball, and baseball. The boys basketball team won the state championship in 1932 and the Class 3A state championship in 2006. In 2007, the volleyball team won the Class AAAA state championship. The volleyball team once again won state in 2017, this time winning the Class 3A championship. The volleyball team went on to win state again in 2018 in Class 3A. The volleyball team ended their run with a 2019 volleyball state championship in Class 4A.

New Castle High School's athletic facilities include the New Castle Fieldhouse, billed as the "World's Largest and Finest High School Fieldhouse", which has the largest permanent seating capacity of any high school gymnasium in the United States.

== Notable people ==
- Steve Alford – college basketball head coach for Nevada Wolf Pack men's basketball, player for Indiana Hoosiers and NBA
- Tom Allen – former head coach for Indiana Hoosiers football
- Trey Ball – professional baseball player in Major League Baseball.
- Kent Benson – professional basketball player in NBA, center of Indiana Hoosiers undefeated 1976 national champions
- Mason Gillis, college basketball player
- Marv Huffman – player for Indiana Hoosiers' 1940 national champions
- Vern Huffman – NFL player, basketball player for Indiana Hoosiers and New Castle's 1932 state champions
- Butch Joyner – professional basketball player in American Basketball Association
- Brandon Miller – former head coach for Butler Bulldogs men's basketball

== See also ==
- List of high schools in Indiana
