= Henry County Courthouse (Indiana) =

- U.S. National Register of Historic Places
- U.S. Historic district – Contributing property
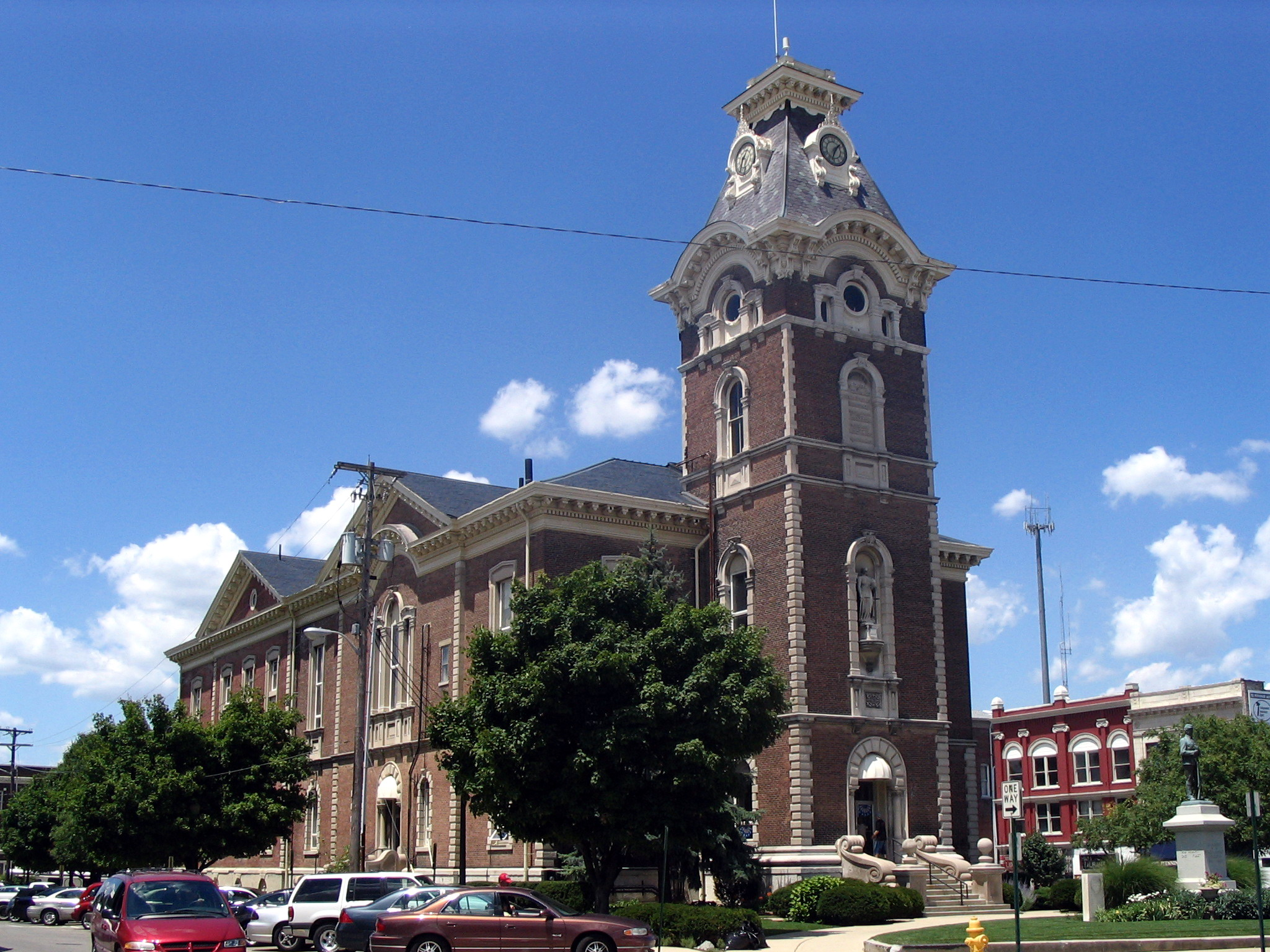
- Front and side of the courthouse

- Location within Indiana Location within the United States
- Location: Courthouse Sq., New Castle, Indiana
- Coordinates: 39°55′51″N 85°22′16″W
- Area: 1.3 acres (0.53 ha)
- Built: 1866
- Architect: Isaac Hodgson
- Architectural style: Second Empire, Italianate, Renaissance Revival
- NRHP reference No.: 81000013
- Added to NRHP: April 2, 1981

The Henry County Courthouse is a historic courthouse located in New Castle, Indiana, US, on the land designated as court house square by the Henry County Commissioners. The Court House was built between 1865 and 1869 at a cost of $120,000. An annex was added in 1905 at a cost of $44,000.

When it was built the commissioners wanted a fireproof courthouse. They did not want to see the courthouse burn again as it had in 1865. Architect Isaac Hodgson provided them with what they wanted, but with a mansard roof and a 110-foot clock tower. The mansard roof was unusual for a midwestern public building in the 1860s. It became popular later, but the Henry County Court House was probably the earliest example of the style for public buildings in the midwest.

Henry County claims the distinction of being the Raintree County described in Ross Lockridge Jr.'s book Raintree County in part because the Henry County Court House is pictured inside the front cover of the book and the book includes references to places in Henry County.

It was added to the National Register of Historic Places in 1981. It is located in the New Castle Commercial Historic District.
