= New Castle Community School Corporation =

School district in Indiana, United States

Address
- 322 Elliott Avenue New Castle, Indiana, 47362; United States of America

District information
- Type: Public
- Grades: PK-12
- Superintendent: Dr. Matthew Shoemaker

Students and staff
- Students: 3,881 (2009-10)
- Athletic conference: Hoosier Heritage Conference

Other information
- Website: www.nccsc.k12.in.us

The New Castle Community School Corporation is a public school corporation located in New Castle, Indiana. In addition to New Castle, the district serves all of Henry Township and an adjoining portion of Liberty Township in Henry County, Indiana. The district has one high school, one middle school, and six elementary schools. Additionally, the district administers programs for special education, adult education, and vocational and career.

Bundy Auditorium, constructed in 1972 as part of the middle school, hosts school programs and serves as a venue for community events. The New Castle Fieldhouse, part of New Castle High School, is recognized as the largest high school fieldhouse in the world. The middle school includes a swimming facility.

== History ==
Prior to the formation of the New Castle Community School Corporation, the city of New Castle was served by the New Castle-Henry Township school system. Former elementary schools included Bundy, Holland, Hernly and Weir. Each building was named for local community leaders and has since been demolished.

In early 2010, schools across the state were forced to cut spending as a result of funding cuts made by governor Mitch Daniels. In addition to state cuts, declining enrollment and unanticipated shortfalls in property tax revenue forced the corporation to cut roughly $2.7 million from its budget. As one of several cost-saving measures, the school board voted to close Greenstreet Elementary School and reassign students from the alternative school to the former elementary building. Meanwhile, the Greestreet students would be redistributed among Parker, Westwood, and Wilbur Wright. Additionally, the school board laid off thirty-one teachers in April 2010, but was able to recall fifteen teachers before the school year ended.

In 2015 there was uneven enrollment across various elementary schools, and the district considered redistributing the students.

== Schools ==
Secondary

- New Castle High School (9–12)
- New Castle Middle School (6–8)

Elementary

- Eastwood Elementary
- Riley Elementary
- Parker Elementary
- Westwood Elementary
- Wilbur Wright Elementary

Vocational

New Castle Career Center

Former

- By 2016, the school district moved students above the third grade from Sunnyside Elementary School to Eastwood Elementary School. That year, the district considered closing Sunnyside Elementary.
