= New Castle, Indiana =

City of New Castle
- City
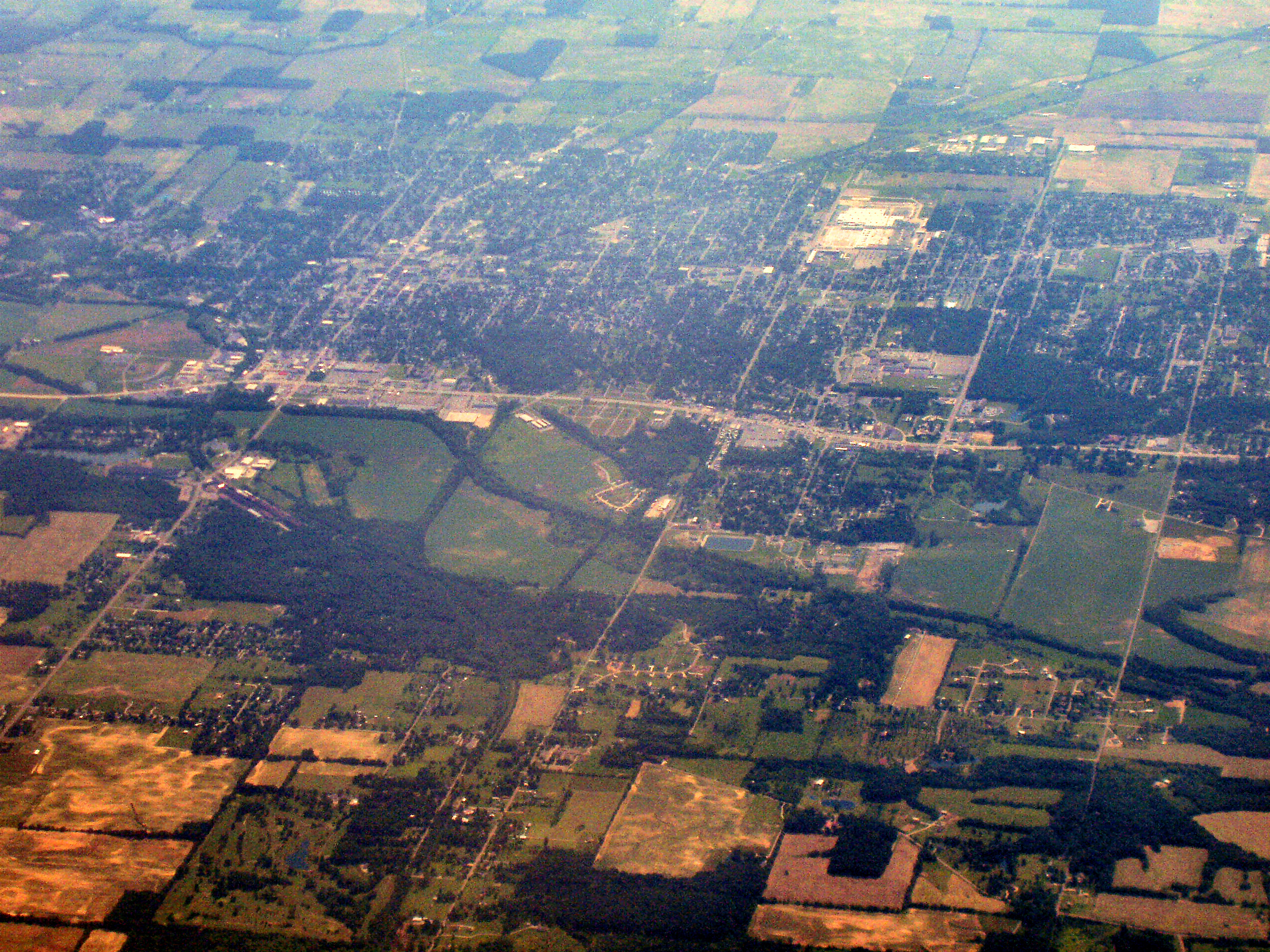
- New Castle from the air, looking east.

- Seal
- Motto: "A City of Valor"
- Location of New Castle in Henry County, Indiana.
- Coordinates: 39°54′50″N 85°23′04″W
- Country: United States
- State: Indiana
- County: Henry
- Settled: 1822

Government
  - Mayor: Greg York (D)

Area
  - Total: 7.34 sq mi (19.02 km^{2})
  - Land: 7.32 sq mi (18.97 km^{2})
  - Water: 0.019 sq mi (0.05 km^{2}) 0.27%
- Elevation: 1,063 ft (324 m)

Population (2020)
  - Total: 17,396
  - Estimate (2025): 17,373 ▼
  - Density: 2,375.1/sq mi (917.03/km^{2})
- Time zone: UTC-5 (EST)
  - Summer (DST): UTC-4 (EDT)
- ZIP code: 47362
- Area code: 765
- FIPS code: 18-52740
- GNIS feature ID: 2395191
- Website: www.cityofnewcastle.net

New Castle is a city in Henry County, Indiana, United States. Located 44 miles (71 km) east-northeast of Indianapolis, on the Big Blue River, the city is the county seat of Henry County. New Castle is home to New Castle Fieldhouse, the largest high school gymnasium in the world. The city is surrounded by agricultural land. In the past, it was a manufacturing center for the production of sheet iron and steel, automobiles, caskets, clothing, scales, bridges, pianos, furniture, handles, shovels, lathes, bricks, and flour. Starting in the early 20th century, it was known as the Rose City, at one point having 100 florists and numerous growers.

According to the 2020 census, the population was 17,396.

New Castle Correctional Facility, with a capacity of over 3,500 inmates, is located just north of the city.

== History ==
New Castle was platted in 1823, and named after New Castle, Kentucky. A post office was established at New Castle in 1823.

The town was quickly established as the seat of Henry County upon the county's organization in 1823, cementing its importance as a center for trade and government in the region. The Maxwell automobile factory, later owned and operated by Chrysler Motor Corp. was, at the time of construction (1907), the largest automotive manufacturing plant in the nation.

The Chrysler Enclosure, Gen. William Grose House, Henry County Courthouse, and New Castle Commercial Historic District are listed on the National Register of Historic Places.

== Geography ==
According to the 2010 census, New Castle has a total area of 7.311 square miles (18.94 km^{2}), of which 7.29 square miles (18.88 km^{2}) (or 99.71%) is land and 0.021 square miles (0.05 km^{2}) (or 0.29%) is water.

=== Climate ===
Climate is designated as Humid continental, and this region typically has large seasonal temperature differences, with warm to hot (and often humid) summers and cold (sometimes severely cold) winters. The Köppen Climate Classification subtype for this climate is "Dfa". (Hot Summer Continental Climate).

Climate data for New Castle, Indiana, 1991–2020 normals, extremes 1949–present
Month	Jan	Feb	Mar	Apr	May	Jun	Jul	Aug	Sep	Oct	Nov	Dec	Year
Record high °F (°C)	72 (22)	75 (24)	84 (29)	89 (32)	93 (34)	107 (42)	102 (39)	100 (38)	101 (38)	93 (34)	82 (28)	72 (22)	107 (42)
Mean maximum °F (°C)	56.9 (13.8)	60.0 (15.6)	71.0 (21.7)	79.6 (26.4)	85.8 (29.9)	89.9 (32.2)	90.5 (32.5)	89.8 (32.1)	88.8 (31.6)	82.1 (27.8)	69.1 (20.6)	59.4 (15.2)	92.5 (33.6)
Mean daily maximum °F (°C)	34.1 (1.2)	38.0 (3.3)	48.8 (9.3)	61.8 (16.6)	72.2 (22.3)	80.2 (26.8)	83.1 (28.4)	82.0 (27.8)	77.2 (25.1)	65.2 (18.4)	50.6 (10.3)	38.8 (3.8)	61.0 (16.1)
Daily mean °F (°C)	25.6 (−3.6)	28.7 (−1.8)	38.4 (3.6)	50.1 (10.1)	60.9 (16.1)	69.4 (20.8)	72.1 (22.3)	70.5 (21.4)	64.6 (18.1)	53.1 (11.7)	40.8 (4.9)	30.9 (−0.6)	50.4 (10.3)
Mean daily minimum °F (°C)	17.1 (−8.3)	19.4 (−7.0)	28.0 (−2.2)	38.4 (3.6)	49.7 (9.8)	58.6 (14.8)	61.0 (16.1)	58.9 (14.9)	52.0 (11.1)	41.0 (5.0)	31.0 (−0.6)	22.9 (−5.1)	39.8 (4.3)
Mean minimum °F (°C)	−5.4 (−20.8)	−1.1 (−18.4)	11.0 (−11.7)	23.5 (−4.7)	34.2 (1.2)	45.6 (7.6)	50.7 (10.4)	48.8 (9.3)	38.9 (3.8)	27.0 (−2.8)	17.7 (−7.9)	3.8 (−15.7)	−8.4 (−22.4)
Record low °F (°C)	−26 (−32)	−19 (−28)	−9 (−23)	12 (−11)	24 (−4)	38 (3)	44 (7)	38 (3)	27 (−3)	18 (−8)	−10 (−23)	−21 (−29)	−26 (−32)
Average precipitation inches (mm)	3.01 (76)	2.46 (62)	3.40 (86)	4.42 (112)	4.85 (123)	5.34 (136)	4.70 (119)	3.38 (86)	3.07 (78)	3.23 (82)	3.45 (88)	3.04 (77)	44.35 (1,125)
Average snowfall inches (cm)	7.9 (20)	6.4 (16)	3.4 (8.6)	0.3 (0.76)	0.0 (0.0)	0.0 (0.0)	0.0 (0.0)	0.0 (0.0)	0.0 (0.0)	0.0 (0.0)	0.9 (2.3)	5.9 (15)	24.8 (62.66)
Average precipitation days (≥ 0.01 in)	12.8	10.6	11.8	13.0	12.7	11.9	10.6	8.3	8.3	9.0	10.3	11.6	130.9
Average snowy days (≥ 0.1 in)	5.5	4.6	2.0	0.3	0.0	0.0	0.0	0.0	0.0	0.1	0.6	3.5	16.6
Source 1: NOAA
Source 2: National Weather Service

== Demographics ==
Historical population
Census	Pop.	Note	%±
1850	666		—
1860	417		−37.4%
1870	1,556		273.1%
1880	2,299		47.8%
1890	2,697		17.3%
1900	3,406		26.3%
1910	9,446		177.3%
1920	14,458		53.1%
1930	14,027		−3.0%
1940	16,620		18.5%
1950	18,271		9.9%
1960	20,349		11.4%
1970	21,215		4.3%
1980	20,056		−5.5%
1990	17,753		−11.5%
2000	17,780		0.2%
2010	18,114		1.9%
2020	17,396		−4.0%
2025 (est.)	17,373		−0.1%
Source: US Census Bureau

=== 2020 census ===
As of the 2020 census, New Castle had a population of 17,396. The median age was 41.3 years. 20.9% of residents were under the age of 18 and 19.5% of residents were 65 years of age or older. For every 100 females there were 90.5 males, and for every 100 females age 18 and over there were 87.6 males age 18 and over.

98.6% of residents lived in urban areas, while 1.4% lived in rural areas.

There were 7,550 households in New Castle, of which 26.4% had children under the age of 18 living in them. Of all households, 34.9% were married-couple households, 21.2% were households with a male householder and no spouse or partner present, and 34.1% were households with a female householder and no spouse or partner present. About 36.0% of all households were made up of individuals and 15.8% had someone living alone who was 65 years of age or older.

There were 8,606 housing units, of which 12.3% were vacant. The homeowner vacancy rate was 2.8% and the rental vacancy rate was 10.9%.

Racial composition as of the 2020 census
Race	Number	Percent
White	16,029	92.1%
Black or African American	308	1.8%
American Indian and Alaska Native	39	0.2%
Asian	85	0.5%
Native Hawaiian and Other Pacific Islander	5	0.0%
Some other race	203	1.2%
Two or more races	727	4.2%
Hispanic or Latino (of any race)	439	2.5%

=== 2010 census ===
As of the census of 2010, there were 18,114 people, 7,769 households, and 4,660 families residing in the city. The population density was 2,481.4 inhabitants per square mile (958.1/km^{2}). There were 9,002 housing units at an average density of 1,233.2 per square mile (476.1/km^{2}). The racial makeup of the city was 95.1% White, 1.9% African American, 0.2% Native American, 0.4% Asian, 0.6% from other races, and 1.8% from two or more races. Hispanic or Latino of any race were 1.7% of the population.

There were 7,769 households, of which 30.1% had children under the age of 18 living with them, 39.0% were married couples living together, 16.1% had a female householder with no husband present, 4.9% had a male householder with no wife present, and 40.0% were non-families. 34.9% of all households were made up of individuals, and 15.8% had someone living alone who was 65 years of age or older. The average household size was 2.29 and the average family size was 2.93.

The median age in the city was 39.5 years. 23.4% of residents were under the age of 18; 8.8% were between the ages of 18 and 24; 24.7% were from 25 to 44; 26.4% were from 45 to 64; and 16.7% were 65 years of age or older. The gender makeup of the city was 46.7% male and 53.3% female.

=== 2000 census ===
As of the census of 2000, there were 17,780 people, 7,462 households, and 4,805 families residing in the city. The population density was 2,987.5 inhabitants per square mile (1,153.5/km^{2}). There were 8,042 housing units at an average density of 1,351.3 per square mile (521.7/km^{2}). The racial makeup of the city was 96.37% White, 1.85% African American, 0.22% Native American, 0.21% Asian, 0.02% Pacific Islander, 0.41% from other races, and 0.91% from two or more races. Hispanic or Latino of any race were 1.09% of the population.

There were 7,462 households, out of which 28.9% had children under the age of 18 living with them, 46.7% were married couples living together, 13.8% had a female householder with no husband present, and 35.6% were non-families. Some 31.5% of all households were made up of individuals, and 15.3% had someone living alone who was 65 years of age or older. The average household size was 2.32 and the average family size was 2.90.

In the city, the population was spread out, with 23.5% under the age of 18, 8.6% from 18 to 24, 28.9% from 25 to 44, 21.8% from 45 to 64, and 17.3% who were 65 years of age or older. The median age was 38 years. For every 100 females, there were 88.7 males. For every 100 females age 18 and over, there were 84.3 males.

The median income for a household in the city was $30,688, and the median income for a family was $37,463. Males had a median income of $32,624 versus $20,554 for females. The per capita income for the city was $17,587. About 10.6% of families and 12.4% of the population were below the poverty line, including 15.7% of those under age 18 and 9.2% of those age 65 or over.

== Government ==
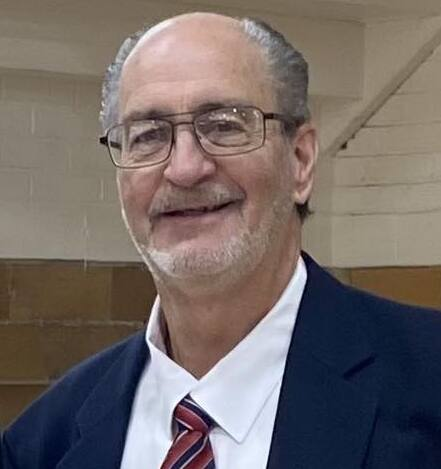
Incumbent Mayor Greg York (2026)

New Castle is a third class city and has a seven-member city council chaired by the mayor. One council member is elected from each of the city's five districts and two are elected at-large. The clerk-treasurer and city judge are also elected offices. City elections are held every four years in the year preceding presidential elections.

The mayor is elected by popular vote and appoints the police chief, fire chief, city attorney, and department heads of the various municipal agencies.

== Education ==
- New Castle Community School Corporation
- New Castle Career Center
- Ivy Tech Community College of Indiana

The city has a public library, the New Castle-Henry County Public Library.

== Other attractions ==
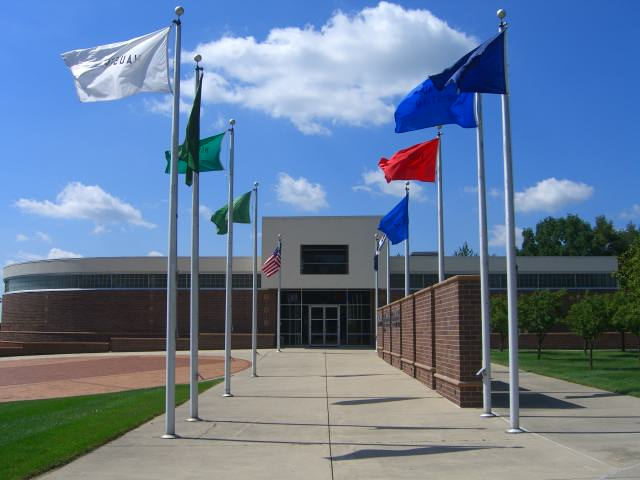
Indiana Basketball Hall of Fame building.

- Nine of the eleven largest high school gyms in the United States are in Indiana. The largest of these is the New Castle Fieldhouse at New Castle High School. The fieldhouse has a capacity of 9,325. The fieldhouse is notable for a 1961 State Sectional Game between New Castle and Lewisville (now part of South Henry School Corporation) in which the fans attending the game were snowed in. The next morning food was delivered to the Fieldhouse by a local bakery and a church service was piped into the gym. The gym has also played host to the 2006 Indiana Class 3A Basketball Champs and the 2007 Class 4A Volleyball Champions.
- Indiana Basketball Hall of Fame is located near New Castle High School.
- Next to New Castle High School is a Native American mound dated to approximately 2000 BP. This mound contains depressions which align to sunrise/sunset during the equinoxes as well as aligning with depressions in similar mounds tens of miles away. A mound complex (from between 800 B.C. and A.D 1400) was discovered on Elliott Avenue, and the more extensive "New Castle Site" is north of the city, on the east side of the Blue River
- Thornhaven Manor, built in 1845, is advertised as "a curious haunt" and featured on the Travel Channel's Ghost Adventures, Ghost Adventures: Aftershocks, and Destination America's Ghost Brothers. The address is 2172 Spiceland Road, New Castle. Built in Italianate architectural style, it was thought to be a stop on the Underground Railroad.

== International relations ==
The town attended a World Summit of towns called Newcastle held in Newcastle-under-Lyme in England for six days from 17 June 2006

Neuburg an der Donau, Germany Neuchâtel, Switzerland Neufchâteau, Vosges, France (United States) New Castle, Delaware, USA (United States) New Castle, Indiana, USA	(United States) New Castle, Pennsylvania, USA Newcastle-under-Lyme, England Newcastle upon Tyne, England Newcastle, KwaZulu-Natal, South Africa Shinshiro, Japan

== Notable people ==
- Steve Alford, NCAA basketball player and coach
- Tom Allen, NCAA head football coach
- Trey Ball, baseball player
- Kent Benson, NBA basketball player
- Major General Omar Bundy, United States Army officer who fought in the Indian Wars, the Spanish–American War, and World War I, where he commanded the 2nd Division in 1918
- Trevor Chowning, pop artist and former Hollywood talent agent/producer
- Richard Crane, actor
- William Grose, American Civil War general
- Tracy Hines, NASCAR Craftsman Truck Series and United States Auto Club driver
- Vern Huffman, basketball and football player for Indiana University
- Robert Indiana, artist
- Fred Luddy businessman
- Peter Malnati, golfer
- David Lee Roth, singer
- Doreen Canaday Spitzer (1914–2010), archaeologist
