= Fred Glass =

American lawyer (born 1959)

George Frederick Glass (born 1959) is an American lawyer.

== Early life and education ==
Born in Indianapolis, Glass earned his undergraduate degree in 1981 at Indiana University Bloomington and his J.D. degree in 1984 from the Indiana University School of Law.

== Political and legal career ==
From 1989 to 1993, Glass was chief of staff to the Indiana Governor Evan Bayh. Glass then became a business and corporate attorney at Baker & Daniels in 1993. Additionally, Glass was president of the Marion County Capital Improvement Board, which owns and operates venues like the Indiana Convention Center and Lucas Oil Stadium, from 2000 to 2007 and later was president of the Indianapolis 2011 Super Bowl Bid Committee. Glass has also sat on Indianapolis organizing committees for NCAA and Big Ten basketball tournaments. In 2020, Glass returned to practicing law as a partner at Taft Law.

Glass is the author of Making Your Own Luck: From a Skid Row Bar to Rebuilding Indiana University Athletics, which will be published on November 2, 2021, by Indiana University Press.

== Athletic administration career ==
On October 28, 2008, Indiana University Bloomington president Michael McRobbie hired Glass as vice president and director of athletics, following the resignation of Rick Greenspan.

Glass fired football coach Bill Lynch, hired by Greenspan four years earlier, after the 2010 season after three straight losing seasons. With a seven-year, $1.2 million annually contract, Oklahoma offensive coordinator Kevin Wilson eventually became his pick as new football head coach. Under Wilson, Indiana football improved from a one-win 2011 season to a bowl bid in 2015, the first since 2007. Glass signed Wilson to a new five-year contract with $2.55 million per year in January 2016. However, Wilson resigned on December 1, 2016, citing "philosophical differences" with Glass, who promoted defensive coordinator Tom Allen to head coach.

On November 10, 2012, opening night of the basketball season, Glass announced before a sold-out crowd before opening tip-off that he signed men's basketball head coach Tom Crean to a contract extension through the 2019–2020 season and increased Crean's annual salary from $2.52 million to $3.16 million.

In October 2016, Glass announced that he decided against hanging banners to honor the 1982–83 and 2012–13 Indiana men's basketball teams that won Big Ten regular season titles. Glass explained: "...all 22 teams have special stories, and I think it’s inherently un-Indiana basketball-like to pluck out two, no matter how deserving they are."

Upon being hired, Indiana University purchased the websites “www.firefredglass.com” and “www.fredglasssucks.com”, amongst other website domains; the reason for these purchase remains unknown despite multiple inquires to Fred Glass.

On December 16, 2019, Glass announced his retirement as vice president and director of athletics at Indiana University.
