= 36th Indiana Infantry Regiment =

36th Regiment Indiana Infantry
- Active: September 16, 1861 – July 12, 1865
- Country: United States
- Allegiance: Union
- Branch: Infantry
- Engagements: Battle of Shiloh; Siege of Corinth; Battle of Perryville; Battle of Stones River; Tullahoma Campaign; Battle of Chickamauga; Siege of Chattanooga; Battle of Lookout Mountain; Battle of Missionary Ridge; Atlanta campaign; Battle of Resaca; Battle of Kennesaw Mountain; Siege of Atlanta; Battle of Jonesboro; Second Battle of Franklin; Battle of Nashville (one company); Battle of Bentonville

The 36th Regiment Indiana Infantry was an infantry regiment that served in the Union Army during the American Civil War.

== Service ==
The 36th Indiana Infantry was organized at Richmond, Indiana and mustered in for a three-year enlistment on September 16, 1861, under the command of Colonel William Grose.

The regiment was attached to 10th Brigade, Army of the Ohio, October–November 1861. 10th Brigade, 4th Division, Army of the Ohio, to September 1862. 10th Brigade, 4th Division, II Corps, Army of the Ohio, to November 1862. 3rd Brigade, 2nd Division, Left Wing, XIV Corps, Army of the Cumberland, to January 1863. 3rd Brigade, 2nd Division, XXI Corps, Army of the Cumberland, to October 1863. 3rd Brigade, 1st Division, IV Corps, Army of the Cumberland, to June 1865. 2nd Brigade, 1st Division, 4th Army Corps, to July 1865.

The 36th Indiana Infantry mustered out of service at Louisville, Kentucky on July 15, 1865.

== Detailed service ==
Ordered to Kentucky and duty at Camp Wickliffe, Kentucky, until February 1862. Expedition down Ohio River to reinforce General Grant at Fort Donelson, Tennessee, then to Nashville, Tennessee, February 14–25, 1862. Occupation of Nashville February 25. March to Savannah, Tennessee, March 17-April 6. Battle of Shiloh, April 6–7. Advance on and siege of Corinth, Mississippi, April 29-May 30. Occupation of Corinth May 30. Pursuit to Booneville May 31-June 12. Buell's Campaign in northern Alabama and Middle Tennessee June to August. Round Mountain, near Woodbury, August 28. March to Nashville, Tennessee, then to Louisville, Kentucky, in pursuit of Bragg, August 21-September 26. Pursuit of Bragg to Wildcat, Kentucky, October 1–20. Wildcat, Kentucky, October 17. March to Nashville, Tennessee, October 20-November 9, and duty there until December 26. Advance on Murfreesboro December 26–30. Battle of Stones River December 30–31, 1862 and January 1–3, 1863. Duty at Murfreesboro until June. Action at Woodbury January 24. Tullahoma Campaign June 23-July 7. At Manchester until August 16. Passage of the Cumberland Mountains and Tennessee River and Chickamauga Campaign August 16-September 22. Battle of Chickamauga September 19–20. Siege of Chattanooga, September 24-November 23. Reopening Tennessee River October 26–29. Chattanooga-Ringgold Campaign November 23–27. Lookout Mountain November 23–24. Missionary Ridge November 25. Pigeon Hill November 26. Ringgold Gap, Taylor's Ridge, November 27. Duty at Whiteside, Tyner's Station and Blue Springs until May 1864. Demonstration on Dalton, Georgia, February 22–27. Near Dalton February 23. Tunnel Hill, Buzzard's Roost Gap and Rocky Faced Ridge February 23–25. Atlanta Campaign May 1 to September 8. Tunnel Hill May 6–7. Demonstrations on Rocky Faced Ridge and Dalton May 8–13. Buzzard's Roost Gap May 8–9. Battle of Resaca May 14–15. Near Kingston May 18–19. Near Cassville May 19. Advance on Dallas May 22–25. Operations on line of Pumpkin Vine Creek and battles about Dallas, New Hope Church, and Allatoona Hills May 25-June 5. Operations about Marietta and against Kennesaw Mountain June 10-July 2. Pine Hill June 11–14. Lost Mountain June 15–17. Assault on Kennesaw June 27. Ruff's Station, Smyrna Camp Ground, July 4. Chattahoochee River July 5–17. Peachtree Creek July 19–20. Siege of Atlanta July 22-August 25. Non-veterans mustered out August 13, 1864. Veterans and recruits consolidated into a battalion. Flank movement on Jonesboro August 25–30. Battle of Jonesboro August 31-September 1. Lovejoy's Station September 2–6. Pursuit of Hood into Alabama October 3–26. Nashville Campaign November–December. Columbia, Duck River, November 24–27. Battle of Franklin November 30. Battle of Nashville December 15–16. Pursuit of Hood to the Tennessee River December 17–28. Moved to Huntsville, Alabama, and duty there until March 1865. Operations in eastern Tennessee March 15-April 22. At Nashville, Tennessee until June. Ordered to New Orleans, Louisiana, June 16. Transferred to 30th Indiana Battalion Infantry July 12, 1865.

== Casualties ==
The regiment lost a total of 245 men during service; 11 officers and 102 enlisted men killed or mortally wounded, 2 officers and 130 enlisted men died of disease.

== Commanders ==
- Colonel William Grose
- Lieutenant Colonel Oliver Hazard Perry Carey - commanded at the battles of Perryville and Chickamauga
- Major Isaac Kinley - commanded at the battle of Stones River
- Major Gilbert Trusler - commanded at the battle of Chickamauga
- Captain Pyrrhus Woodward - commanded at the battle of Stones River
- Lieutenant John P. Swisher - commanded one company at the battle of Nashville

== See also ==
- List of Indiana Civil War regiments
- Indiana in the Civil War
