= Industrial Exposition Building =

Building in Minneapolis, Minnesota, United States

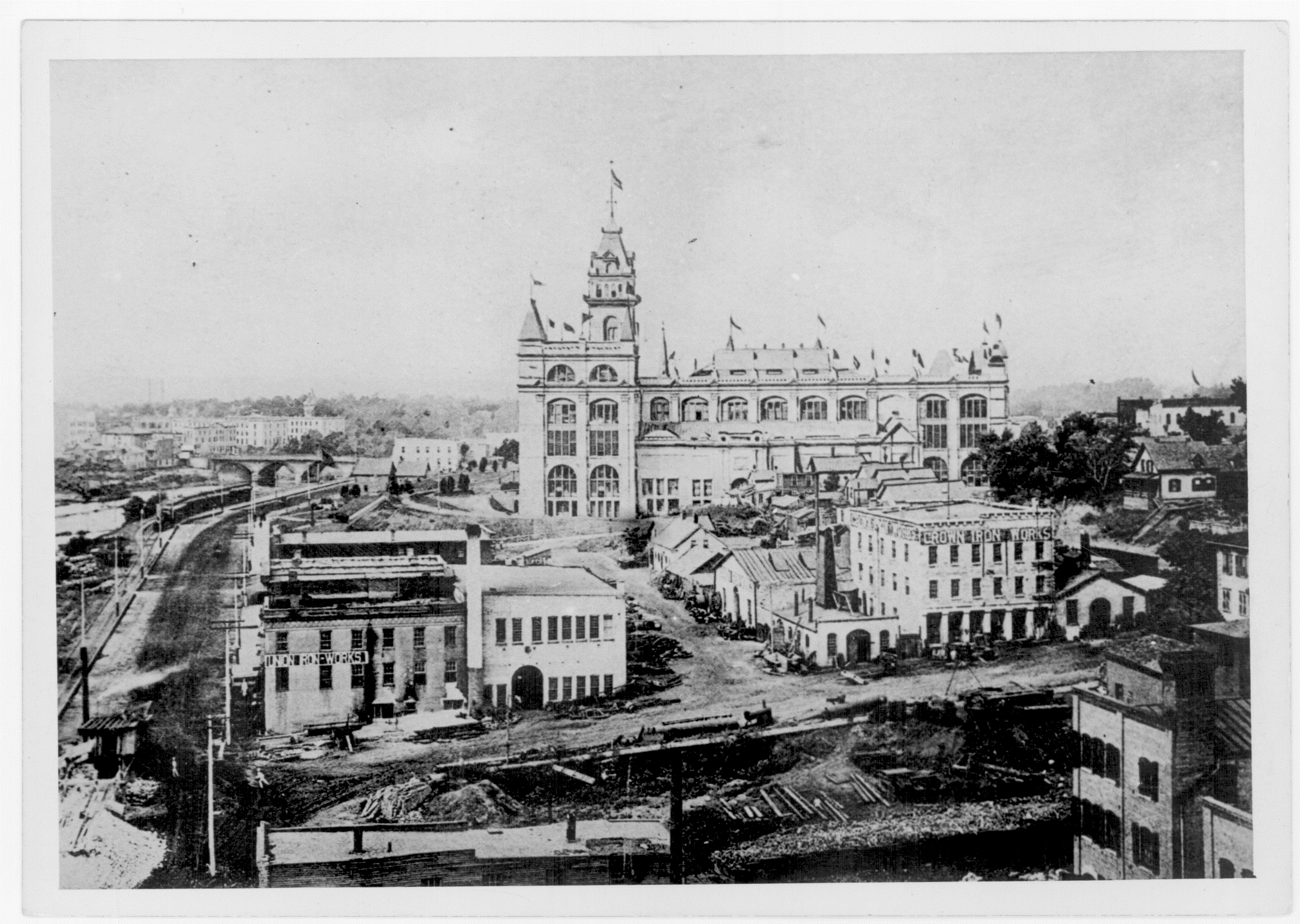
- The Industrial Exposition Building as seen from the Pillsbury 'A' Mill, c. 1890
- Interactive map of the Industrial Exposition Building area
- Alternative names: International Stock Food Company Warehouse

General information
- Status: Demolished
- Location: 101 Central Avenue Southeast, Minneapolis, Minnesota
- Coordinates: 44°59′9″N 93°15′24″W
- Completed: 1886
- Destroyed: 1940

Height
- Roof: 240 ft (73 m)

Technical details
- Floor count: 8

The Industrial Exposition Building was located in Minneapolis, Minnesota. The building stood from 1886 to 1940 and was briefly the tallest structure in Minneapolis. In addition to smaller local exhibitions, it was the site of the 1892 Republican National Convention, the only major party convention to be held in Minnesota until the 2008 Republican National Convention.

The idea for an exposition in Minneapolis arose in 1885, when it became known that St. Paul had secured the permanent home of the Minnesota State Fair. Prominent citizens of Minneapolis such as Minneapolis Tribune owner Alden Blethen felt slighted, and an open meeting was called to gauge public support for an annual Minneapolis industrial fair, or exposition, to rival St. Paul's agricultural one. Supporters raised funds throughout the fall of 1885 and reached their goal of $250,000 on December 15.

The structure was built on the site of the Winslow House Hotel (today the area bounded by Bank Street SE, Central Avenue SE, Main Street SE, and Ortman Street SE). Designed by Isaac Hodgson, the building had eight stories. Its modified Renaissance exterior was dominated by a 240-foot corner tower. The exterior walls were masonry and the interior had metal support structures. The building's capacity was estimated at between 11,000 and 15,000.

The entire building was completed in just over three months: the cornerstone was laid on April 29, 1886, and the building was finished on August 3. On August 23 there was a grand celebration for the opening of the new building and its first exposition. 50,000 people were estimated to have attended and much of downtown was turned over to the celebration. Local dignitaries such as Senator Cushman K. Davis and Archbishop John Ireland spoke at the dedication. US President Grover Cleveland and his wife Frances could not attend. However, they sent a congratulatory telegram that was read publicly, and then in a dramatic moment, Mrs. Cleveland touched a special button in her New York location that started all of the machinery in the building.

The initial 40-day exposition was very successful, attracting nearly 500,000 visitors. The latest technology and industrial developments were on display, along with a collection of art and sculpture estimated at $500,000 in value. But in the following years, excitement lessened and the exposition began to lose money. Minneapolis could not have attracted the Republican National Convention of 1892 without the Industrial Exposition Building, but the convention was not enough to halt the exposition's decline. By 1893, exhibitors had evaporated and the fair had fallen apart.

In 1896, Thomas B. Janney bought the building at public auction for $25,000, a fraction of what it cost to build. For the next seven years, the space was used sporadically as a performance venue. It hosted the first concerts of the Minneapolis Symphony Orchestra which later became the Minnesota Orchestra and welcomed famous musicians and performers including Johann Strauss and New York's Metropolitan Opera. In 1903, Marion Savage, owner of race horse Dan Patch, bought the building and turned it into the International Stock Food Company.

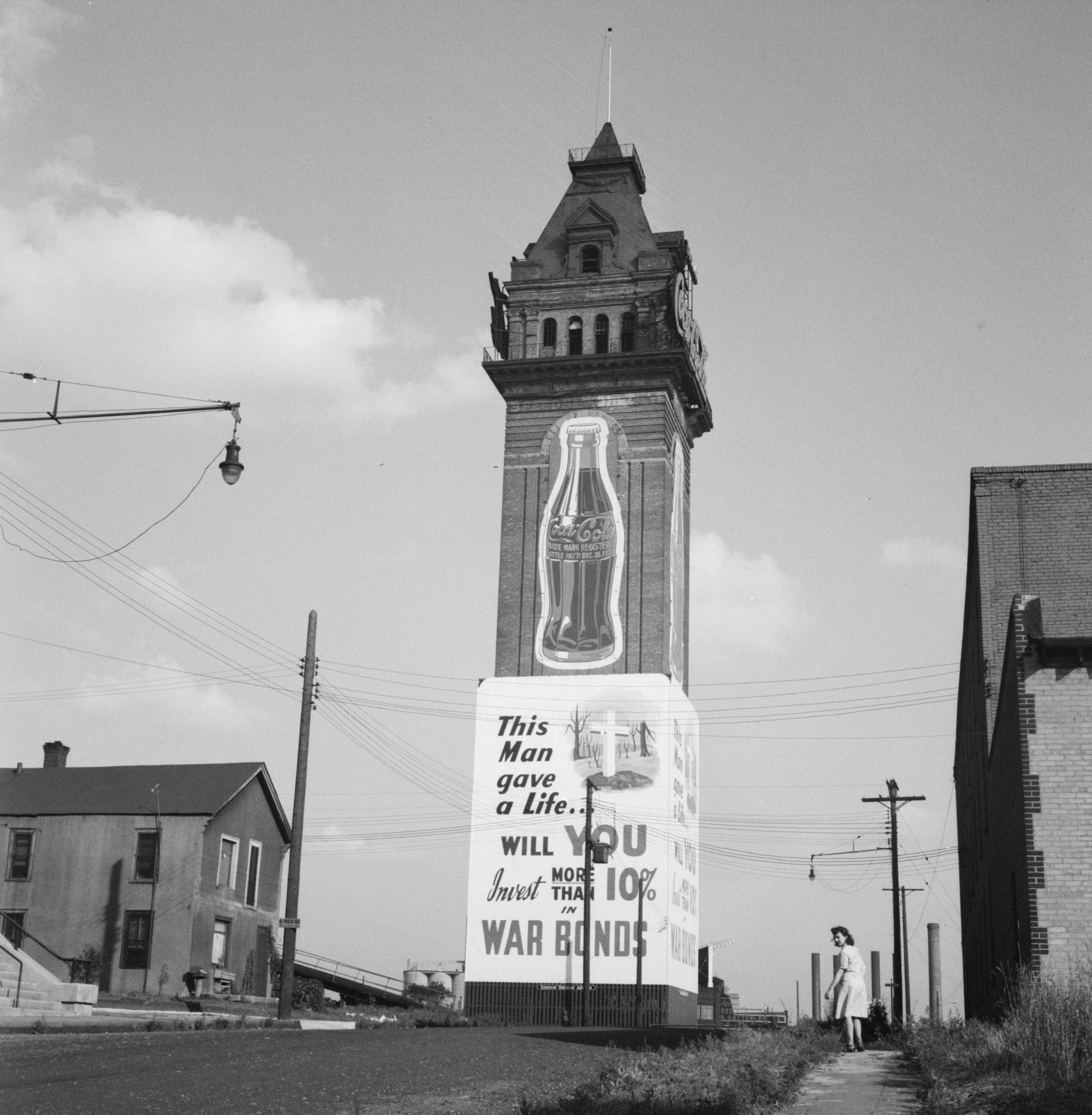
The tower between 1940 and 1945

By the 1930s, it was used as a merchandise warehouse for the M.W. Savage Co. mail order company. The structure was finally torn down in 1940 for the construction of a Coca-Cola bottling plant. The bottling plant was torn down in the 1980s and the site has since been redeveloped into condominiums.
