= Temple Heights Christian School =

Defunct school in Florida, United States

Coordinates: 27.9650214°N 82.4073159°W

Information
- Established: 1958
- Closed: 2007
- Grades: K-6
- Affiliation: Florida Association of Christian Colleges and Schools; American Association of Christian Schools

Temple Heights Christian School, located in Tampa, Florida, was a ministry of Temple Heights Baptist Church and was one of the oldest Christian schools in the state of Florida. The school was founded in 1958 with 64 students attending kindergarten through sixth grade. Temple Heights Christian School was a founding member of the Florida Association of Christian Colleges and Schools and was also a member of the American Association of Christian Schools.

== History ==
The school's tax exemption was revoked by the Internal Revenue Service after it declined to document that it had a racial nondiscriminatory admissions policy.

The school was closed and the property sold in 2007.
