= Northwestern Wildcats football statistical leaders =

The Northwestern Wildcats football statistical leaders are individual statistical leaders of the Northwestern Wildcats football program in various categories, including passing, rushing, receiving, total offense, defensive stats, and kicking. Within those areas, the lists identify single-game, single-season, and career leaders. The Wildcats represent Northwestern University in the NCAA Division I FBS Big Ten Conference.

Although Northwestern began competing in intercollegiate football in 1876 (150 years ago), records from before the 1950s are often incomplete and inconsistent, so players from then may not make it onto these lists.

These lists are dominated by more recent players for several reasons:

- Since the 1950s, seasons have increased from 10 games to 11 and then 12 games in length.
- The NCAA didn't allow freshmen to play varsity football until 1972 (with the exception of the World War II years), allowing players to have four-year careers.
- Bowl games only began counting toward single-season and career statistics in 2002. The Wildcats have played in 10 bowl games since the decision, allowing many recent players an extra game to accumulate statistics.
- Since 2018, players have been allowed to participate in as many as four games in a redshirt season; previously, playing in even one game "burned" the redshirt. Since 2024, postseason games have not counted against the four-game limit. These changes to redshirt rules have given very recent players several extra games to accumulate statistics.

These lists are updated through the end of the 2025 season.

== Passing ==
=== Passing yards ===
Career
Rank	Player	Yards	Years
1	Clayton Thorson	10,731	2015 2016 2017 2018
2	Brett Basanez	10,580	2002 2003 2004 2005
3	Len Williams	7,487	1990 1991 1992 1993
4	C. J. Bachér	7,319	2005 2006 2007 2008
5	Trevor Siemian	5,931	2011 2012 2013 2014
6	Zak Kustok	5,822	1999 2000 2001
7	Mike Greenfield	5,803	1984 1985 1986 1987
8	Sandy Schwab	5,679	1982 1983 1984 1985
9	Steve Schnur	5,612	1993 1994 1995 1996
10	Dan Persa	5,181	2009 2010 2011

Single season
Rank	Player	Yards	Year
1	C. J. Bachér	3,656	2007
2	Brett Basanez	3,622	2005
3	Mike Kafka	3,430	2009
4	Clayton Thorson	3,183	2018
5	Clayton Thorson	3,182	2016
6	Clayton Thorson	2,844	2017
7	Brett Basanez	2,838	2004
8	Sandy Schwab	2,735	1982
9	Zak Kustok	2,692	2001
10	Steve Schnur	2,632	1996

Single game
Rank	Player	Yards	Year	Opponent
1	Mike Kafka	532	2009	Auburn (Outback Bowl)
2	C. J. Bachér	520	2007	Michigan State
3	Brett Basanez	513	2004	TCU
4	C. J. Bachér	470	2007	Minnesota
5	Brett Basanez	463	2005	Purdue
6	Clayton Thorson	455	2018	Nebraska
7	Mike Greenfield	446	1985	Northern Illinois
8	Sandy Schwab	436	1982	Michigan
9	Ryan Hilinski	435	2022	Duke
10	Zak Kustok	421	2001	Bowling Green

=== Passing touchdowns ===
Career
Rank	Player	TDs	Years
1	Clayton Thorson	61	2015 2016 2017 2018
2	Len Williams	44	1990 1991 1992 1993
	Brett Basanez	44	2002 2003 2004 2005
4	C. J. Bachér	43	2005 2006 2007 2008
5	Zak Kustok	42	1999 2000 2001
6	Dan Persa	34	2009 2010 2011
7	Steve Schnur	32	1993 1994 1995 1996
8	Mitch Anderson	28	1972 1973 1974
9	Trevor Siemian	27	2011 2012 2013 2014
10	Maurie Daigneau	23	1969 1970 1971

Single season
Rank	Player	TDs	Year
1	Clayton Thorson	22	2016
2	Brett Basanez	21	2005
3	Zak Kustok	20	2001
4	Zak Kustok	19	2000
	C. J. Bachér	19	2007
	C. J. Bachér	19	2008
7	Steve Schnur	17	1996
	Dan Persa	17	2011
	Preston Stone	17	2025
	Clayton Thorson	17	2018

Single game
Rank	Player	TDs	Year	Opponent
1	Mitch Anderson	5	1973	Minnesota
	C. J. Bachér	5	2007	Michigan State

== Rushing ==
=== Rushing yards ===
Career
Rank	Player	Yards	Years
1	Justin Jackson	5,440	2014 2015 2016 2017
2	Damien Anderson	4,485	1998 1999 2000 2001
3	Tyrell Sutton	3,886	2005 2006 2007 2008
4	Darnell Autry	3,793	1994 1995 1996
5	Bob Christian	2,643	1987 1988 1989 1990
6	Jason Wright	2,625	2000 2001 2002 2003
7	Noah Herron	2,524	2001 2002 2003 2004
8	Greg Boykin	2,465	1972 1973 1975 1976
9	Evan Hull	2,417	2019 2020 2021 2022
10	Kain Colter	2,180	2010 2011 2012 2013

Single season
Rank	Player	Yards	Year
1	Damien Anderson	2,063	2000
2	Darnell Autry	1,785	1995
3	Justin Jackson	1,524	2016
4	Tyrell Sutton	1,474	2005
5	Darnell Autry	1,452	1996
6	Justin Jackson	1,418	2015
7	Jason Wright	1,388	2003
8	Noah Herron	1,381	2004
9	Venric Mark	1,366	2012
10	Justin Jackson	1,311	2017

Single game
Rank	Player	Yards	Year	Opponent
1	Mike Adamle	316	1969	Wisconsin
2	Byron Sanders	295	1987	Minnesota
3	Damien Anderson	292	2000	Indiana
4	Damien Anderson	268	2000	Michigan
5	Jason Wright	251	2003	Illinois
6	Tyrell Sutton	244	2005	Wisconsin
7	Darnell Autry	240	1996	Iowa
8	Jason Wright	237	2003	Bowling Green (Motor City Bowl)
9	Damien Anderson	230	2000	Minnesota
10	Darnell Autry	226	1995	Purdue

=== Rushing touchdowns ===
Career
Rank	Player	TDs	Years
1	Justin Jackson	41	2014 2015 2016 2017
2	Damien Anderson	38	1998 1999 2000 2001
3	Darnell Autry	35	1994 1995 1996
4	Jason Wright	32	2000 2001 2002 2003
5	Tyrell Sutton	31	2005 2006 2007 2008
6	Kain Colter	28	2010 2011 2012 2013
7	Clayton Thorson	27	2015 2016 2017 2018
8	Noah Herron	26	2001 2002 2003 2004
9	Zak Kustok	22	1999 2000 2001
10	Ron Burton	21	1957 1958 1959

Single season
Rank	Player	TDs	Year
1	Damien Anderson	23	2000
2	Jason Wright	20	2003
3	Darnell Autry	17	1995
	Darnell Autry	17	1996
5	Tyrell Sutton	16	2005
6	Justin Jackson	15	2016
7	Noah Herron	14	2004
8	Ron Burton	12	1958
	Jason Wright	12	2002
	Venric Mark	12	2012
	Kain Colter	12	2012

Single game
Rank	Player	TDs	Year	Opponent
1	Mike Adamle	4	1970	Minnesota
	Darnell Autry	4	1996	Iowa
	Damien Anderson	4	2000	Illinois
	Damien Anderson	4	2000	Indiana
	Damien Anderson	4	2001	Duke
	Jason Wright	4	2002	Indiana
	Jason Wright	4	2003	Kansas
	Jason Wright	4	2003	Indiana
	Jason Wright	4	2003	Illinois
	Tyrell Sutton	4	2005	Northern Illinois
	Kain Colter	4	2012	Indiana

== Receiving ==
=== Receptions ===
Career
Rank	Player	Rec	Years
1	D'Wayne Bates	210	1995 1996 1997 1998
2	Richard Buchanan	197	1987 1988 1989 1990
3	Jeremy Ebert	173	2008 2009 2010 2011
4	Kunle Patrick	171	2000 2001 2002 2003
5	Shaun Herbert	168	2003 2004 2005 2006
6	Ross Lane	163	2005 2006 2007 2008
7	Mark Philmore	163	2002 2003 2004 2005
8	Eric Peterman	160	2005 2006 2007 2008
9	Lee Gissendaner	156	1990 1991 1992 1993
10	Tyrell Sutton	154	2005 2006 2007 2008

Single season
Rank	Player	Rec	Year
1	Richard Buchanan	94	1989
2	Zeke Markshausen	91	2009
3	Austin Carr	90	2016
4	Ricky Edwards	83	1983
	D'Wayne Bates	83	1998
6	Shaun Herbert	79	2005
7	D'Wayne Bates	75	1996
8	Jeremy Ebert	75	2011
9	Griffin Wilde	71	2025
10	Lee Gissendaner	68	1992

Single game
Rank	Player	Rec	Year	Opponent
1	Jon Harvey	17	1982	Michigan
2	Zeke Markshausen	16	2009	Michigan State
3	Todd Jenkins	15	1982	Purdue
4	Richard Buchanan	14	1989	Minnesota
	Evan Hull	14	2022	Duke
6	Don Stonesifer	13	1950	Minnesota
	Sam Poulos	13	1979	Illinois
	Richard Buchanan	13	1989	Duke
	Lee Gissendaner	13	1993	Minnesota
	Jeremy Ebert	13	2011	Iowa
	Christian Jones	13	2013	Illinois
	Austin Carr	13	2016	Wisconsin

=== Receiving yards ===
Career
Rank	Player	Yards	Years
1	D'Wayne Bates	3,370	1995 1996 1997 1998
2	Richard Buchanan	2,474	1987 1988 1989 1990
3	Jeremy Ebert	2,400	2008 2009 2010 2011
4	Ross Lane	2,068	2005 2006 2007 2008
5	Eric Peterman	2,011	2005 2006 2007 2008
6	Shaun Herbert	1,926	2003 2004 2005 2006
7	Lee Gissendaner	1,878	1990 1991 1992 1993
8	Kunle Patrick	1,873	2000 2001 2002 2003
9	Bryce Kirtz	1,781	2020 2021 2022 2023 2024
10	Mark Philmore	1,768	2002 2003 2004 2005

Single season
Rank	Player	Yards	Year
1	Austin Carr	1,247	2016
2	D'Wayne Bates	1,245	1998
3	D'Wayne Bates	1,196	1996
4	Richard Buchanan	1,115	1989
5	Jeremy Ebert	953	2010
6	Andrew Brewer	925	2009
7	D'Wayne Bates	889	1995
8	Griffin Wilde	880	2025
9	Brian Musso	865	1997
10	Shaun Herbert	862	2005

Single game
Rank	Player	Yards	Year	Opponent
1	Jim Lash	226	1972	Michigan State
	Todd Sheets	226	1980	Purdue
3	Bryce Kirtz	215	2023	Minnesota
4	Evan Hull	213	2022	Duke
5	Jon Harvey	208	1982	Michigan
	Jeremy Ebert	208	2011	Rice
7	Jonathan Fields	202	2004	TCU
8	Todd Jenkins	189	1982	Purdue
9	Tony Jones	185	2013	Syracuse
10	Brian Musso	183	1997	Duke

=== Receiving touchdowns ===
Career
Rank	Player	TDs	Years
1	D'Wayne Bates	26	1995 1996 1997 1998
2	Richard Buchanan	22	1987 1988 1989 1990
3	Jeremy Ebert	21	2008 2009 2010 2011
4	Sam Simmons	14	1998 1999 2000 2001
	Steve Bogan	14	1978 1979 1981
	Drake Dunsmore	14	2007 2009 2010 2011
	Austin Carr	14	2015 2016
8	Joe Collier	13	1951 1952 1953
	Lee Gissendaner	13	1990 1991 1992 1993
	Ross Lane	13	2005 2006 2007 2008

Single season
Rank	Player	TDs	Year
1	D'Wayne Bates	12	1996
	Austin Carr	12	2016
3	Jeremy Ebert	11	2011
4	Richard Buchanan	9	1989
	D'Wayne Bates	9	1998
	Andrew Brewer	9	2009
7	Joe Collier	8	1952
	Brian Musso	8	1997
	Jeremy Ebert	8	2010
	Griffin Wilde	8	2025

Single game
Rank	Player	TDs	Year	Opponent
1	Drake Dunsmore	4	2011	Indiana

== Total offense ==
Total offense is the sum of passing and rushing statistics. It does not include receiving or returns.

=== Total offense yards ===
Career
Rank	Player	Yards	Years
1	Brett Basanez	11,576	2002 2003 2004 2005
2	Clayton Thorson	11,139	2015 2016 2017 2018
3	Len Williams	8,029	1990 1991 1992 1993
4	C. J. Bachér	7,571	2005 2006 2007 2008
5	Zak Kustok	7,116	1999 2000 2001
6	Mike Greenfield	6,707	1984 1985 1986 1987
7	Trevor Siemian	5,908	2011 2012 2013 2014
8	Dan Persa	5,897	2009 2010 2011
9	Steve Schnur	5,542	1993 1994 1995 1996
10	Justin Jackson	5,464	2014 2015 2016 2017

Single season
Rank	Player	Yards	Year
1	Brett Basanez	4,045	2005
2	Mike Kafka	3,725	2009
3	C. J. Bachér	3,687	2007
4	Clayton Thorson	3,280	2016
5	Zak Kustok	3,272	2001
6	Dan Persa	3,100	2010
7	Clayton Thorson	3,073	2018
8	Brett Basanez	3,096	2004
9	Zak Kustok	2,894	2000
10	Clayton Thorson	2,867	2017

Single game
Rank	Player	Yards	Year	Opponent
1	Mike Kafka	566	2009	Auburn (Outback Bowl)
2	Brett Basanez	548	2004	TCU
3	Zak Kustok	532	2001	Bowling Green
4	C. J. Bachér	525	2007	Michigan State
5	Brett Basanez	506	2005	Purdue
6	C. J. Bachér	491	2007	Minnesota
7	Brett Basanez	448	2005	UCLA (Sun Bowl)
	Clayton Thorson	448	2018	Nebraska
9	Mike Greenfield	446	1985	Northern Illinois
10	Trevor Siemian	433	2013	Illinois

=== Total touchdowns ===
Career
Rank	Player	TDs	Years
1	Clayton Thorson	88	2015 2016 2017 2018
2	Zak Kustok	64	1999 2000 2001
3	Brett Basanez	62	2002 2003 2004 2005
4	Len Williams	55	1990 1991 1992 1993
5	C. J. Bachér	51	2005 2006 2007 2008
6	Kain Colter	46	2010 2011 2012 2013
7	Dan Persa	44	2009 2010 2011
8	Justin Jackson	42	2014 2015 2016 2017
9	Steve Schnur	38	1993 1994 1995 1996
	Damien Anderson	38	1998 1999 2000 2001

Single season
Rank	Player	TDs	Year
1	Zak Kustok	31	2001
2	Zak Kustok	28	2000
3	Brett Basanez	28	2005
4	Clayton Thorson	27	2016
5	Clayton Thorson	26	2018
6	Mike Kafka	24	2009
	Dan Persa	24	2010
8	Damien Anderson	23	2000
	C. J. Bachér	23	2007
	Clayton Thorson	23	2017

== Defense ==
=== Interceptions ===
Career
Rank	Player	Ints	Years
1	Brett Whitley	15	1984 1985 1986 1987
2	Tom Worthington	14	1946 1947 1948 1949
3	Malcolm Hunter	11	1974 1975 1976 1977
	Brian Peters	11	2008 2009 2010 2011
5	Eric Hutchinson	10	1969 1970 1971
	Harold Blackmon	10	1997 1998 1999 2000
	Ibraheim Campbell	10	2011 2012 2013 2014
8	Willie Lindsey	9	1989 1990 1991 1992
	Sherrick McManis	9	2006 2007 2008 2009
	Brandon Joseph	9	2019 2020 2021

Single season
Rank	Player	Ints	Year
1	Brett Whitley	7	1987
	Willie Lindsey	7	1991
3	Tom Worthington	6	1947
	Eric Hutchinson	6	1970
	Brandon Joseph	6	2020

=== Tackles ===
Career
Rank	Player	Tackles	Years
1	Tim McGarigle	545	2002 2003 2004 2005
2	Chuck Kern	503	1977 1978 1979 1980
3	Barry Gardner	468	1995 1996 1997 1998
4	Ed Sutter	429	1988 1989 1990 1991
5	William Bennett	418	1992 1993 1994 1995
6	Paddy Fisher	401	2017 2018 2019 2020
7	Kevin Bentley	390	1998 1999 2000 2001
8	Chris Bergin	354	2017 2018 2019 2020 2021
9	Paul Maly	343	1973 1975 1976 1977
10	Eric Collier	342	1994 1995 1996 1997

Single season
Rank	Player	Tackles	Year
1	Chuck Kern	227	1979
2	Chuck Kern	218	1978
3	John Voorhees	192	1971
4	Barry Gardner	175	1998
5	Barry Gardner	174	1997
6	Ed Sutter	161	1990
7	Tim McGarigle	156	2005
8	Tim McGarigle	151	2004
9	Kevin Bentley	148	1999
10	Kevin Bentley	147	2001

Single game
Rank	Player	Tackles	Year	Opponent
1	Chuck Kern	31	1979	Purdue

=== Sacks ===
Career
Rank	Player	Sacks	Years
1	Joe Gaziano	30.0	2016 2017 2018 2019
2	Casey Dailey	28.0	1994 1995 1996 1997
3	Ifeadi Odenigbo	23.5	2013 2014 2015 2016
4	Steve Shine	21.0	1990 1991 1992 1993
5	Aidan Hubbard	20.5	2022 2023 2024 2025
6	Corey Wootton	19.5	2006 2007 2008 2009
7	Vince Browne	19.0	2008 2009 2010 2011
8	Dwayne Missouri	17.0	1997 1998 1999 2000
9	Tyler Scott	16.0	2010 2011 2012
10	Deonte Gibson	15.0	2012 2013 2014 2015

Single season
Rank	Player	Sacks	Year
1	Casey Dailey	12.0	1997

Single game
Rank	Player	Sacks	Year	Opponent
1	Ifeadi Odenigbo	4.0	2016	Iowa

== Kicking ==
=== Field goals made ===
Career
Rank	Player	FGs	Years
1	Brian Gowins	58	1995 1996 1997 1998
2	Jeff Budzien	48	2010 2011 2012 2013
3	John Duvic	46	1983 1984 1985 1986
4	Charlie Kuhbander	43	2017 2018 2019 2020 2021
5	Jack Mitchell	40	2013 2014 2015 2016
	Jack Olsen	40	2021 2022 2023 2024 2025
7	Ira Adler	39	1987 1988 1989 1990
	Sam Valenzisi	39	1992 1993 1994 1995
9	Stefan Demos	34	2007 2008 2009 2010
10	Amado Villarreal	33	2005 2006 2007 2008

Single season
Rank	Player	FGs	Year
1	Jeff Budzien	23	2013
2	Brian Gowins	20	1997
	Amado Villarreal	20	2008
4	Jeff Budzien	19	2012
	John Duvic	19	1986
	Jack Olsen	19	2025
7	Stefan Demos	18	2009
	Jack Mitchell	18	2015
9	Brian Gowins	17	1998
10	Brian Gowins	16	1996
	Stefan Demos	16	2010

Single game
Rank	Player	FGs	Year	Opponent
1	Jeff Howells	5	2005	Penn State
	Jeff Budzien	5	2012	Boston College
3	Sam Valenzisi	4	1993	Minnesota
	Sam Valenzisi	4	1995	Michigan
	Brian Gowins	4	1998	Hawaii
	Tim Long	4	2000	Michigan
	Stefan Demos	4	2009	Purdue
	Stefan Demos	4	2009	Wisconsin
	Jeff Budzien	4	2013	Michigan
	Jack Mitchell	4	2014	Notre Dame
	Jack Olsen	4	2023	Maryland
	Jackson Kleather	4	2026	Oregon

=== Field goal percentage ===
Career
Rank	Player	FG%	Years
1	Jeff Budzien	87.3%	2010 2011 2012 2013
2	Jack Olsen	78.4%	2021 2022 2023 2024 2025
3	Luke Akers	76.5%	2024 2025
4	Amado Villarreal	75.0%	2005 2006 2007 2008
5	Sam Valenzisi	73.6%	1992 1993 1994 1995
6	Ira Adler	72.2%	1987 1988 1989 1990
7	Tim Long	71.4%	1998 1999 2000

Single season
Rank	Player	FG%	Year
1	Jeff Budzien	95.0%	2012
2	Sam Valenzisi	93.8%	1995
3	Jeff Budzien	92.0%	2013
4	Jack Olsen	90.5%	2025
5	John Duvic	82.6%	1986
6	Charlie Kuhbander	81.3%	2017
7	Amado Villarreal	80.0%	2008
