= 1990 Northwestern Wildcats football team =

American college football season

1990 Northwestern Wildcats football
- Conference: Big Ten Conference
- Record: 2–9 (1–7 Big Ten)
- Head coach: Francis Peay (5th season)
- Defensive coordinator: Mike Knoll (1st season)
- Captain: Bob Christian
- Home stadium: Dyche Stadium

1990 Big Ten Conference football standings
	Conf.					Overall
Team	W		L		T	W		L		T
No. 7 Michigan +	6	–	2	–	0	9	–	3	–	0
No. 16 Michigan State +	6	–	2	–	0	8	–	3	–	1
No. 25 Illinois +	6	–	2	–	0	8	–	4	–	0
No. 18 Iowa +	6	–	2	–	0	8	–	4	–	0
Ohio State	5	–	2	–	1	7	–	4	–	1
Minnesota	5	–	3	–	0	6	–	5	–	0
Indiana	3	–	4	–	1	6	–	5	–	1
Northwestern	1	–	7	–	0	2	–	9	–	0
Purdue	1	–	7	–	0	2	–	9	–	0
Wisconsin	0	–	8	–	0	1	–	10	–	0
+ – Conference co-champions; Rankings from AP Poll

The 1990 Northwestern Wildcats team represented Northwestern University during the 1990 NCAA Division I-A football season. In their fifth year under head coach Francis Peay, the Wildcats compiled a 2–9 record (1–7 against Big Ten Conference opponents) and finished in last place in the Big Ten Conference.

The team's offensive leaders were quarterback Len Williams with 1,700 passing yards, Bob Christian with 939 rushing yards, and Richard Buchanan with 834 receiving yards. Three Northwestern players received All-Big Ten honors in 1990: (1) wide receiver Richard Buchanan (AP-1); (2) defensive lineman Mel Agee (AP-1); and (3) defensive lineman Don Davey (AP-1).

== Schedule ==
Date	Time	Opponent	Site	TV	Result	Attendance	Source
September 8		Duke*	Dyche Stadium; Evanston, IL		L 24–27	28,177	
September 22		at Rice*	Rice Stadium; Houston, TX		L 14–31	15,300	
September 29	11:30 a.m.	Northern Illinois*	Dyche Stadium; Evanston, IL	ESPN	W 24–7	26,798	
October 6	11:30 a.m.	Indiana	Dyche Stadium; Evanston, IL		L 0–42	30,447	
October 13	1:30 p.m.	at Minnesota	Hubert H. Humphrey Metrodome; Minneapolis, MN		L 25–35	32,522	
October 20	1:00 p.m.	Wisconsin	Dyche Stadium; Evanston, IL		W 44–34	32,966	
October 27	1:00 p.m.	at No. 15 Iowa	Kinnick Stadium; Iowa City, IA		L 14–56	69,501	
November 3	1:30 p.m.	at Ohio State	Ohio Stadium; Columbus, OH		L 7–48	89,177	
November 10	1:00 p.m.	Purdue	Dyche Stadium; Evanston, IL		L 13–33	25,026	
November 17	1:05 p.m.	No. 23 Michigan State	Dyche Stadium; Evanston, IL		L 22–29	24,959	
November 24	1:00 p.m.	at No. 22 Illinois	Memorial Stadium; Champaign, IL (rivalry)		L 23–28	32,383	
*Non-conference game; Rankings from AP Poll released prior to the game; All times are in Central time

== Roster ==
1990 Northwestern Wildcats football team roster
Players
Coaches
Offense

Pos.	#	Name	Class
WR	1	Richard Buchanan
RB	34	Bob Christian (C)
WR	83	Lee Gissendaner
QB	12	Len Williams	Fr

Defense

Pos.	#	Name	Class
LB	60	Thomas Homco
LB	54	Ed Sutter

Special teams

Pos.	#	Name	Class

Head coach

- Francis Peay

Coordinators/assistant coaches

Legend

- (C) Team captain
- (S) Suspended
- (I) Ineligible
- Injured
- Redshirt
