= 1999 Northwestern Wildcats football team =

American college football season

1999 Northwestern Wildcats football
- Conference: Big Ten Conference
- Record: 3–8 (1–7 Big Ten)
- Head coach: Randy Walker (1st season)
- Offensive coordinator: Kevin Wilson (1st season)
- Offensive scheme: I formation
- Base defense: 4–3
- Captain: Jeff Dyra
- Home stadium: Ryan Field

1999 Big Ten Conference football standings
	Conf.			Overall
Team	W		L	W		L
No. 4 Wisconsin $	7	–	1	10	–	2
No. 7 Michigan State	6	–	2	10	–	2
No. 5 Michigan %	6	–	2	10	–	2
No. 11 Penn State	5	–	3	10	–	3
No. 18 Minnesota	5	–	3	8	–	4
No. 24 Illinois	4	–	4	8	–	4
No. 25 Purdue	4	–	4	7	–	5
Ohio State	3	–	5	6	–	6
Indiana	3	–	5	4	–	7
Northwestern	1	–	7	3	–	8
Iowa	0	–	8	1	–	10
$ – BCS representative as conference champion; % – BCS at-large representative; Rankings from AP Poll

The 1999 Northwestern Wildcats football team represented Northwestern University as a member of the Big Ten Conferenceduring the 1999 NCAA Division I-A football season. Led by first-year head coach Randy Walker, the Wildcats compiled an overall record of 3–8 with a mark of 1–7 in conference play, placing tenth in the Big Ten. Northwestern played home games at Ryan Field in Evanston, Illinois.

== Schedule ==
Date	Time	Opponent	Site	TV	Result	Attendance	Source
September 4	11:30 am	Miami (OH)*	Ryan Field; Evanston, IL		L 3–28	28,108	
September 11	11:00 am	TCU*	Ryan Field; Evanston, IL	ESPN Plus	W 17–7	26,494	
September 18	11:00 am	at Duke*	Wallace Wade Stadium; Durham, NC	JPS	W 15–12 ^{OT}	18,720	
September 25	11:00 am	at No. 13 Purdue	Ross–Ade Stadium; West Lafayette, IN	ESPN2	L 23–31	58,620	
October 2	11:00 am	Minnesota	Ryan Field; Evanston, IL		L 14–33	24,439	
October 9	1:00 pm	at Indiana	Memorial Stadium; Bloomington, IN		L 17–34	30,101	
October 16	11:00 am	Iowa^{†}	Ryan Field; Evanston, IL	ESPN Plus	W 23–21	33,962	
October 30	11:00 am	No. 11 Wisconsin	Ryan Field; Evanston, IL	ESPN Plus	L 19–35	42,292	
November 6	11:00 am	at No. 16 Michigan	Michigan Stadium; Ann Arbor, MI (rivalry)	ESPN Plus	L 3–37	110,794	
November 13	12:00 pm	No. 17 Michigan State	Ryan Field; Evanston, IL		L 0–34	30,045	
November 20	1:00 pm	at Illinois	Memorial Stadium; Champaign, IL (rivalry)		L 7–29	50,137	
*Non-conference game; ^{†}Homecoming; Rankings from AP Poll released prior to the game; All times are in Central time

== Roster ==
1999 Northwestern Wildcats football team roster
Players
Coaches
Offense

Pos.	#	Name	Class
RB	20	Damien Anderson	So
TE	86	Corbett Elsen	Sr
OL	57	Ty Garner	Sr
C	62	Austin King	Fr
OT	73	Jeff Roehl	Fr
QB	10	Zak Kustok	Jr
WR	32	Sam Simmons	So
TE	84	Jay Tant	Sr

Defense

Pos.	#	Name	Class
DL	58	Matt Anderson	Fr
LB	2	Kevin Bentley	So
CB	6	Harold Blackmon	Jr
DE	7	Ray Bogenrief	Fr
DT	92	Javiar Collins	Jr
LB	40	Pat Durr	Fr
DT	99	Jeff Dyra	Sr
LB	8	Napoleon Harris	So
DE	95	Dwayne Missouri	Jr
DL	55	George Woods	Fr

Special teams

Pos.	#	Name	Class
P	88	Eron Kosmowski	Sr

Head coach

- Randy Walker

Coordinators/assistant coaches

Legend

- (C) Team captain
- (S) Suspended
- (I) Ineligible
- Injured
- Redshirt

Roster
Last update: 1999-10-13

== Game summaries ==
=== Iowa ===
Team	1	2	3	4	Total
Iowa	0	0	14	7	21
• Northwestern	3	13	0	7	23

- Date: October 16
- Location: Ryan Field, Evanston, Illinois
- Game attendance: 33,962

Scoring summary
1	8:57	NW	Tim Long 25 yard field goal	Northwestern 3–0
2	14:52	NW	Tim Long 25 yard field goal	Northwestern 6–0
2	9:14	NW	Tim Long 28 yard field goal	Northwestern 9–0
2	1:57	NW	Teddy Johnson 21 yard pass from Zak Kustok (Tim Long kick)	Northwestern 16–0
3	12:13	IOWA	Randy Reiners 3 yard run (Tim Douglas kick)	Northwestern 16–7
3	3:18	IOWA	Scott Mullen 2 yard run (Tim Douglas kick)	Northwestern 16–14
4	11:13	IOWA	Ladell Betts 74 yard run (Tim Douglas kick)	Iowa 21–16
4	:04	NW	Zak Kustok 2 yard run (Tim Long kick)	Northwestern 23–21

== Team players in the NFL ==
Player	Position	Round	Pick	NFL team
Jay Tant	Tight end	5	164	Arizona Cardinals
