= 1991 Northwestern Wildcats football team =

American college football season

1991 Northwestern Wildcats football
- Conference: Big Ten Conference
- Record: 3–8 (2–6 Big Ten)
- Head coach: Francis Peay (6th season)
- Defensive coordinator: Mike Knoll (2nd season)
- Captains: Darryl Ashmore; Dan Freveletti; Dwight James; Ed Sutter
- Home stadium: Dyche Stadium

1991 Big Ten Conference football standings
	Conf.					Overall
Team	W		L		T	W		L		T
No. 6 Michigan $	8	–	0	–	0	10	–	2	–	0
No. 10 Iowa	7	–	1	–	0	10	–	1	–	1
Ohio State	5	–	3	–	0	8	–	4	–	0
Indiana	5	–	3	–	0	7	–	4	–	1
Illinois	4	–	4	–	0	6	–	6	–	0
Purdue	3	–	5	–	0	4	–	7	–	0
Michigan State	3	–	5	–	0	3	–	8	–	0
Wisconsin	2	–	6	–	0	5	–	6	–	0
Northwestern	2	–	6	–	0	3	–	8	–	0
Minnesota	1	–	7	–	0	2	–	9	–	0
$ – Conference champion; Rankings from AP Poll

The 1991 Northwestern Wildcats team represented Northwestern University during the 1991 NCAA Division I-A football season. In their sixth year under head coach Francis Peay, the Wildcats compiled a 3–8 record (2–6 against Big Ten Conference opponents) and finished in ninth place in the Big Ten Conference.

The team's offensive leaders were quarterback Len Williams with 1,630 passing yards, Dennis Lundy with 568 rushing yards, and Mark Benson with 831 receiving yards.

For the game against Ohio State, Northwestern played a home game against Ohio State in Cleveland.

== Schedule ==
Date	Opponent	Site	Result	Attendance	Source
September 14	Rice*	Dyche Stadium; Evanston, IL	L 7–36	23,216	
September 21	at Rutgers*	Rutgers Stadium; Piscataway, NJ	L 18–22	17,046	
September 28	Wake Forest*	Dyche Stadium; Evanston, IL	W 41–14	25,147	
October 5	Purdue	Dyche Stadium; Evanston, IL	L 14–17	26,814	
October 12	at Indiana	Memorial Stadium; Bloomington, IN	L 6–44	44,915	
October 19	vs. No. 18 Ohio State	Cleveland Stadium; Cleveland, OH	L 3–34	73,830	
October 26	No. 17 Illinois	Dyche Stadium; Evanston, IL (rivalry)	W 17–11	26,542	
November 2	at Michigan State	Spartan Stadium; East Lansing, MI	W 16–13	64,991	
November 9	at No. 4 Michigan	Michigan Stadium; Ann Arbor, MI (rivalry)	L 14–59	102,087	
November 16	No. 9 Iowa	Dyche Stadium; Evanston, IL	L 10–24	33,478	
November 23	at Wisconsin	Camp Randall Stadium; Madison, WI	L 14–32	38,620	
*Non-conference game; Rankings from AP Poll released prior to the game

== Roster ==
1991 Northwestern Wildcats football team roster
Players
Coaches
Offense

Pos.	#	Name	Class
OT	75	Darryl Ashmore
WR	2	Lee Gissendaner
OT	70	Matt O'Dwyer
QB	12	Len Williams	Fr

Defense

Pos.	#	Name	Class
LB	60	Thomas Homco
LB	53	Steve Ostrowaki
LB	98	Adam Schell
LB	54	Ed Sutter

Special teams

Pos.	#	Name	Class

Head coach

- Francis Peay

Coordinators/assistant coaches

Legend

- (C) Team captain
- (S) Suspended
- (I) Ineligible
- Injured
- Redshirt
