= 2001 Northwestern Wildcats football team =

American college football season

2001 Northwestern Wildcats football
- Conference: Big Ten Conference
- Record: 4–7 (2–6 Big Ten)
- Head coach: Randy Walker (3rd season)
- Offensive coordinator: Kevin Wilson (3rd season)
- Offensive scheme: Spread
- Base defense: 4–3
- Captains: Napoleon Harris; Zak Kustok
- Home stadium: Ryan Field

2001 Big Ten Conference football standings
	Conf.			Overall
Team	W		L	W		L
No. 12 Illinois $	7	–	1	10	–	2
No. 20 Michigan	6	–	2	8	–	4
Ohio State	5	–	3	7	–	5
Iowa	4	–	4	7	–	5
Purdue	4	–	4	6	–	6
Penn State	4	–	4	5	–	6
Indiana	4	–	4	5	–	6
Michigan State	3	–	5	7	–	5
Wisconsin	3	–	5	5	–	7
Minnesota	2	–	6	4	–	7
Northwestern	2	–	6	4	–	7
$ – BCS representative as conference champion; Rankings from AP Poll

The 2001 Northwestern Wildcats football team represented Northwestern University during the 2001 NCAA Division I-A football season. They played their home games at Ryan Field and participated as members of the Big Ten Conference. They were coached by Randy Walker.

Prior to the season, senior safety Rashidi Wheeler of Ontario, California collapsed and died during preseason conditioning drills on August 3rd, 2001. An initial report from the Cook County medical examiner indicated that bronchial asthma was the cause of death, and that his death was not heat-related.

== Schedule ==
Date	Time	Opponent	Rank	Site	TV	Result	Attendance	Source
September 7	7:00 pm	at UNLV*	No. 16	Sam Boyd Stadium; Whitney, NV	ESPN2	W 37–28	26,721	
September 15		Navy*		Ryan Field; Evanston, IL		Canceled		
September 22	5:00 pm	at Duke*	No. 16	Wallace Wade Stadium; Durham, NC		W 44–7	18,427	
September 29	2:30 pm	No. 23 Michigan State	No. 16	Ryan Field; Evanston, IL	ABC	W 27–26	40,103	
October 6	6:45 pm	at Ohio State	No. 14	Ohio Stadium; Columbus, OH	ESPN	L 20–38	104,042	
October 13	11:00 am	Minnesota^{†}		Ryan Field; Evanston, IL	ESPN Plus	W 23–17	31,097	
October 20	2:30 pm	Penn State	No. 22	Ryan Field; Evanston, IL	ABC	L 35–38	42,512	
October 27	11:00 am	at No. 24 Purdue		Ross–Ade Stadium; West Lafayette, IN	ESPN2	L 27–32	67,181	
November 3	12:00 pm	at Indiana		Memorial Stadium; Bloomington, IN		L 21–56	26,213	
November 10	11:00 am	Iowa		Ryan Field; Evanston, IL	ESPN Plus	L 16–59	36,458	
November 17	11:00 am	Bowling Green*		Ryan Field; Evanston, IL		L 42–43	23,545	
November 22	12:00 pm	at No. 10 Illinois		Memorial Stadium; Champaign, IL (rivalry)	ESPN2	L 28–34	45,755	
*Non-conference game; ^{†}Homecoming; Rankings from AP Poll released prior to the game; All times are in Central time

== Roster ==
2001 Northwestern Wildcats football team roster
Players
Coaches
Offense

Pos.	#	Name	Class
RB	20	Damien Anderson	Sr
C	62	Austin King	Jr
OT	73	Jeff Roehl	Jr
QB	10	Zak Kustok (C)	Sr
OL	56	Mike Souza	Sr
WR	32	Sam Simmons	Sr

Defense

Pos.	#	Name	Class
LB	2	Kevin Bentley	Sr
DE	7	Ray Bogenrief	So
DT	94	Luis Castillo	Fr
DT	98	Pete Chapman	Jr
DT	97	Colby Clark	Fr
CB	27	Raheem Covington	Jr
LB	3	Pat Durr	Jr
LB	8	Napoleon Harris (C)	Sr
DE	96	Greg Lutzen	Fr

Special teams

Pos.	#	Name	Class

Head coach

- Randy Walker

Coordinators/assistant coaches

Legend

- (C) Team captain
- (S) Suspended
- (I) Ineligible
- Injured
- Redshirt

Roster
Last update: 2002-02-08

== Team players in the NFL ==
Player	Position	Round	Pick	NFL club
Napoleon Harris	Linebacker	1	23	Oakland Raiders
Kevin Bentley	Linebacker	4	101	Cleveland Browns
Sam Simmons	Wide Receiver	5	170	Miami Dolphins
