= 2006 Northwestern Wildcats football team =

American college football season

2006 Northwestern Wildcats football
- Conference: Big Ten Conference
- Record: 4–8 (2–6 Big Ten)
- Head coach: Pat Fitzgerald (1st season)
- Offensive coordinator: Garrick McGee (1st season)
- Offensive scheme: Multiple
- Defensive coordinator: Greg Colby (5th season)
- Base defense: 4–3
- Captains: Erryn Cobb; Bryan Heinz; Shaun Herbert; Nick Roach
- Home stadium: Ryan Field

2006 Big Ten Conference football standings
	Conf.			Overall
Team	W		L	W		L
No. 2 Ohio State $	8	–	0	12	–	1
No. 8 Michigan %	7	–	1	11	–	2
No. 7 Wisconsin	7	–	1	12	–	1
No. 24 Penn State	5	–	3	9	–	4
Purdue	5	–	3	8	–	6
Minnesota	3	–	5	6	–	7
Indiana	3	–	5	5	–	7
Northwestern	2	–	6	4	–	8
Iowa	2	–	6	6	–	7
Illinois	1	–	7	2	–	10
Michigan State	1	–	7	4	–	8
$ – BCS representative as conference champion; % – BCS at-large representative; Rankings from AP Poll

The 2006 Northwestern Wildcats football team represented Northwestern University in the Big Ten Conference during the 2006 NCAA Division I FBS football season. Head coach Randy Walker died unexpectedly on June 29, 2006 of an apparent heart attack at the age of 52. Pat Fitzgerald, seen by many before the tragedy as Walker's eventual successor, was promoted from linebackers coach and recruiting coordinator to head coach on July 7. The Wildcats also had to replace their offensive coordinator, offensive line coach, and Brett Basanez, the team's former four-year starter at quarterback and holder of dozens of school records. The 2006 season was not as successful as previous years.

Northwestern began their season with a win at Miami, Walker's alma mater, in an emotional game that featured several tributes to the late coach. However, the season went downhill from there. The second game was a blowout loss to I-AA New Hampshire. The low point of the season came on October 21 with a home loss to Michigan State in which the Spartans staged the largest comeback in Division I-A history. A win against Illinois in the final game gave the Wildcats a 4–8 record for the year and saved them from finishing last in the Big Ten. The high point of the season, despite coming in defeat, was Northwestern's close and competitive play against undefeated and #3 ranked Michigan. Despite being held to -13 rushing yards, the Wildcats came within one-possession of tying the game early in the third quarter and prevented the Wolverines from scoring in the fourth quarter en route to a 17–3 final.

== Schedule ==
Date	Time	Opponent	Site	TV	Result	Attendance	Source
August 31	6:30 pm	at Miami (Ohio)*	Yager Stadium; Oxford, OH	ESPNU	W 21–3	20,476	
September 9	1:00 pm	New Hampshire*	Ryan Field; Evanston, IL		L 17–34	20,108	
September 16	1:00 pm	Eastern Michigan*	Ryan Field; Evanston, IL		W 14–6	21,935	
September 22	7:00 pm	at Nevada*	Mackay Stadium; Reno, NV	ESPN2	L 21–31	16,176	
September 30	2:30 pm	at Penn State	Beaver Stadium; University Park, PA	ABC	L 7–33	108,837	
October 7	11:00 am	at Wisconsin	Camp Randall Stadium; Madison, WI	ESPN+	L 9–41	81,704	
October 14	11:00 am	Purdue	Ryan Field; Evanston, IL	ESPN+	L 10–31	27,171	
October 21	11:00 am	Michigan State^{†}	Ryan Field; Evanston, IL	ESPN+	L 38–41	29,387	
October 28	11:00 am	at No. 2 Michigan	Michigan Stadium; Ann Arbor, MI (rivalry)	ESPN	L 3–17	109,114	
November 4	11:00 am	at Iowa	Kinnick Stadium; Iowa City, IA	ESPN+	W 21–7	70,585	
November 11	2:30 pm	No. 1 Ohio State	Ryan Field; Evanston, IL	ABC	L 10–54	47,130	
November 18	12:00 pm	Illinois	Ryan Field; Evanston, IL (Sweet Sioux Tomahawk)	ESPN360	W 27–16	22,242	
*Non-conference game; ^{†}Homecoming; Rankings from AP Poll released prior to the game; All times are in Central time

== Roster ==
2006 Northwestern Wildcats football team roster
Players
Coaches
Offense

Pos.	#	Name	Class
QB	13	Mike Kafka	Fr
WR	10	Eric Peterman	So
RB	19	Tyrell Sutton	So

Defense

Pos.	#	Name	Class
DT	89	Corbin Bryant	Fr
CB	20	Marquice Cole	Sr
DT	70	John Gill	So
CB	24	Sherrick McManis	Fr
LB	38	Nick Roach	Sr
DE	99	Corey Wootton	So

Special teams

Pos.	#	Name	Class

Head coach

- Pat Fitzgerald

Coordinators/assistant coaches

Legend

- (C) Team captain
- (S) Suspended
- (I) Ineligible
- Injured
- Redshirt

Roster
