= 2002 Northwestern Wildcats football team =

American college football season

2002 Northwestern Wildcats football
- Conference: Big Ten Conference
- Record: 3–9 (1–7 Big Ten)
- Head coach: Randy Walker (4th season)
- Offensive coordinator: Mike Dunbar (1st season)
- Offensive scheme: Spread
- Defensive coordinator: Greg Colby (1st season)
- Base defense: 4–3
- Captains: Pat Durr; Austin King
- Home stadium: Ryan Field

2002 Big Ten Conference football standings
	Conf.			Overall
Team	W		L	W		L
No. 1 Ohio State $#+	8	–	0	14	–	0
No. 8 Iowa %+	8	–	0	11	–	2
No. 9 Michigan	6	–	2	10	–	3
No. 16 Penn State	5	–	3	9	–	4
Purdue	4	–	4	7	–	6
Illinois	4	–	4	5	–	7
Minnesota	3	–	5	8	–	5
Wisconsin	2	–	6	8	–	6
Michigan State	2	–	6	4	–	8
Northwestern	1	–	7	3	–	9
Indiana	1	–	7	3	–	9
# – BCS National Champion; $ – BCS representative as conference champion; % – BCS at-large representative; + – Conference co-champions; Rankings from AP Poll

The 2002 Northwestern Wildcats football team represented Northwestern University during the 2002 NCAA Division I-A football season. They played their home games at Ryan Field and participated as members of the Big Ten Conference. They were coached by Randy Walker.

== Schedule ==
Date	Time	Opponent	Site	TV	Result	Attendance
August 31	11:00 am	at Air Force*	Falcon Stadium; Colorado Springs, CO	ABC	L 3–52	45,114
September 7	12:00 pm	TCU*	Ryan Field; Evanston, IL	ESPNGP	L 24–48	21,442
September 14	12:00 pm	Duke*	Ryan Field; Evanston, IL		W 26–21	22,910
September 21	11:00 am	at Navy*	Navy–Marine Corps Memorial Stadium; Annapolis, MD	HDNet	W 49–40	27,012
September 28	12:00 pm	at Michigan State	Spartan Stadium; East Lansing, MI		L 24–39	74,215
October 5	6:00 pm	No. 5 Ohio State	Ryan Field; Evanston, IL	ESPN2	L 16–27	43,489
October 10	7:00 pm	at Minnesota	Hubert H. Humphrey Metrodome; Minneapolis, MN		L 42–45	37,729
October 19	11:00 am	at No. 20 Penn State	Beaver Stadium; University Park, PA	ESPN2	L 0–49	108,853
October 26	11:00 am	Purdue^{†}	Ryan Field; Evanston, IL	ESPN+	L 13–42	30,158
November 2	11:00 am	Indiana	Ryan Field; Evanston, IL	ESPN+	W 41–37	25,077
November 9	11:00 am	at No. 6 Iowa	Kinnick Stadium; Iowa City, IA	ESPN2	L 10–62	68,728
November 23	11:00 am	Illinois	Ryan Field; Evanston, IL (Sweet Sioux Tomahawk)	ESPN+	L 24–31	25,134
*Non-conference game; ^{†}Homecoming; Rankings from AP Poll released prior to the game; All times are in Central time

== Roster ==
2002 Northwestern Wildcats football team roster
Players
Coaches
Offense

Pos.	#	Name	Class
QB	14	Brett Basanez	Fr
RB	32	Clifton Dawson	Fr
OT	76	Trai Essex	So
RB	33	Noah Herron	So
C	62	Austin King (C)	Sr
OT	60	Ikechuku Ndukwe	So
OT	73	Jeff Roehl	Sr
WR	6	Jon Schweighardt	Sr
G	63	Zach Strief	Fr
G	64	Matt Ulrich	So
QB	16	Alexander Webb	Fr
RB	18	Jason Wright	Jr

Defense

Pos.	#	Name	Class
DE	7	Ray Bogenrief	Jr
DT	94	Luis Castillo	So
DT	97	Colby Clark	So
DT	67	Barry Cofield	Fr
CB	27	Raheem Covington	Sr
LB	3	Pat Durr (C)	Sr
DE	96	Greg Lutzen	Fr
LB	44	Tim McGarigle	Fr
LB	46	Eric VanderHorst	Fr
CB	31	Marvin Ward	So

Special teams

Pos.	#	Name	Class
P	17	David Wasielewski	Sr

Head coach

- Randy Walker

Coordinators/assistant coaches

- Pat Fitzgerald – Linebackers

Legend

- (C) Team captain
- (S) Suspended
- (I) Ineligible
- Injured
- Redshirt

Roster
Last update: 2002-10-16

== Team players in the NFL ==
Player	Position	Round	Pick	NFL club
Austin King	Center	4	133	Tampa Bay Buccaneers
