= 1989 Northwestern Wildcats football team =

American college football season

1989 Northwestern Wildcats football
- Conference: Big Ten Conference
- Record: 0–11 (0–8 Big Ten)
- Head coach: Francis Peay (4th season)
- Captains: Bob Griswold; Randy McClellan; Tim O'Brien; Derrill Vest
- Home stadium: Dyche Stadium

1989 Big Ten Conference football standings
	Conf.					Overall
Team	W		L		T	W		L		T
No. 7 Michigan $	8	–	0	–	0	10	–	2	–	0
No. 10 Illinois	7	–	1	–	0	10	–	2	–	0
No. 16 Michigan State	6	–	2	–	0	8	–	4	–	0
No. 24 Ohio State	6	–	2	–	0	8	–	4	–	0
Minnesota	4	–	4	–	0	6	–	5	–	0
Indiana	3	–	5	–	0	5	–	6	–	0
Iowa	3	–	5	–	0	5	–	6	–	0
Purdue	2	–	6	–	0	3	–	8	–	0
Wisconsin	1	–	7	–	0	2	–	9	–	0
Northwestern	0	–	8	–	0	0	–	11	–	0
$ – Conference champion; Rankings from AP Poll

The 1989 Northwestern Wildcats team represented Northwestern University during the 1989 NCAA Division I-A football season. In their fourth year under head coach Francis Peay, the Wildcats compiled a 0–11 record (0–8 against Big Ten Conference opponents) and finished in last place in the Big Ten Conference.

The team's offensive leaders were quarterback Tim O'Brien with 2,218 passing yards, junior running back Bob Christian with 1,291 rushing yards, and Richard Buchanan with 1,115 receiving yards. Buchanan received first-team All-Big Ten honors from the Associated Press, and Christian received second-team honors.

== Schedule ==
Date	Time	Opponent	Site	Result	Attendance	Source
September 9		at Duke*	Wallace Wade Stadium; Durham, NC	L 31–41	15,220	
September 16		Air Force*	Dyche Stadium; Evanston, IL	L 31–48	45,799	
September 23		Rutgers*	Dyche Stadium; Evanston, IL	L 27–38	24,312	
October 7	1:00 p.m.	at Indiana	Memorial Stadium; Bloomington, IN	L 11–43	47,845	
October 14	1:00 p.m.	Minnesota	Dyche Stadium; Evanston, IL	L 18–20	26,899	
October 21		at Wisconsin	Camp Randall Stadium; Madison, WI	L 31–35	44,978	
October 28	1:00 p.m.	Iowa	Dyche Stadium; Evanston, IL	L 22–35	36,312	
November 4	1:00 p.m.	Ohio State	Dyche Stadium; Evanston, IL	L 27–52	28,238	
November 11		at Purdue	Ross–Ade Stadium; West Lafayette, IN	L 15–46	31,470	
November 18	1:05 p.m.	at Michigan State	Spartan Stadium; East Lansing, MI	L 14–76	64,817	
November 25	2:00 p.m.	No. 11 Illinois	Dyche Stadium; Evanston, IL (rivalry)	L 14–63	31,017	
*Non-conference game; Rankings from AP Poll released prior to the game; All times are in Central time

== Game summaries ==
=== Ohio State ===
Ohio State Buckeyes (5–2) at Northwestern Wildcats (0–7)

Quarter	1	2	3	4	Total
Ohio St	7	21	7	17	52
Northwestern	7	0	6	14	27

at Dyche Stadium, Evanston, Illinois

- Date: November 4
- Game time: 1:00 p.m.
- Game weather: Overcast, 45 °F (7 °C)
- Game attendance: 28,236
- Referee: John Nealon
- TV announcers (WOSU-TV): Jack Kramer and Paul Warfield
- Box Score

Game information

First quarter

- OSU – Carlos Snow 25-yard run (Pat O'Morrow kick), 9:04. Ohio St 7–0. Drive: 13 plays, 85 yards, 5:56.
- NW – Tim O'Brien 11-yard run (Ira Adler kick), 4:52. Tie 7–7. Drive: 9 plays, 61 yards, 4:12.

Second quarter

- OSU – Scottie Graham 20-yard run (Pat O'Morrow kick), 5:05. Ohio St 14–7. Drive: 11 plays, 75 yards, 4:16.
- OSU – James Bryant 63-yard run (Pat O'Morrow kick), 2:04. Ohio St 21–7. Drive: 2 plays, 77 yards, 0:17.
- OSU – James Bryant 46-yard pass from Greg Frey (Pat O'Morrow kick), 0:59. Ohio St 28–7. Drive: 2 plays, 46 yards, 0:16.

Third quarter

- OSU – Dante Lee 5-yard run (Pat O'Morrow kick), 5:20. Ohio St 35–7. Drive: 16 plays, 80 yards, 9:40.
- NW – Bob Christian 3-yard run (run failed), 2:46. Ohio St 35–13. Drive: 9 plays, 51 yards, 2:34.

Fourth quarter

- OSU – Pat O'Morrow 19-yard field goal, 14:13. Ohio St 38–13. Drive: 9 plays, 80 yards, 3:33.
- OSU – Dante Lee 8-yard run (Pat O'Morrow kick), 10:49. Ohio St 45–13. Drive: 4 plays, 29 yards, 1:48.
- NW – Richard Buchanan 14-yard pass from Tim O'Brien (pass failed), 8:14. Ohio St 45–20. Drive: 9 plays, 78 yards, 2:35.
- OSU – Dante Lee 6-yard run (Pat O'Morrow kick), 1:15. Ohio St 52–20. Drive: 13 plays, 80 yards, 6:59.
- NW – Mark Benson 21-yard pass from Kevin Krebs (run good), 0:00. Ohio St 52–28. Drive: 8 plays, 73 yards, 1:15.

Top passers

- OSU – Greg Frey – 8/10, 106 yards, TD
- NW – Tim O'Brien – 15/21, 172 yards, TD, INT

Top rushers

- OSU – Dante Lee – 24 rushes, 157 yards, 3 TD
- NW – Bob Christian – 27 rushes, 144 yards, TD

Top receivers

- OSU – James Bryant – 1 reception, 46 yards, TD
- NW – Richard Buchanan – 8 receptions, 101 yards, TD

=== At Purdue ===
Northwestern Wildcats (0–8) at Purdue Boilermakers (1–7)

Quarter	1	2	3	4	Total
Northwestern	0	7	8	0	15
Purdue	32	0	0	14	46

at Ross–Ade Stadium, West Lafayette, Indiana

- Date: November 11, 1989
- Game attendance: 31,470

Purdue snapped a streak of 10 straight games without a first quarter point.

Team	Category	Player	Statistics
Northwestern	Passing	Tim O'Brien	15/40, 213 Yds, 2 TD
Northwestern	Rushing	Bob Christian	21 Rush, 59 Yds
Northwestern	Receiving		
Purdue	Passing	Eric Hunter	11/24, 263 Yds, 3 TD
Purdue	Rushing	Eric Hunter	9 Rush, 55 Yds
Purdue	Receiving	Rod Dennis	4 Rec, 146 Yds, 3 TD

Scoring summary

Quarter	Time	Drive			Team	Scoring information	Score	
Quarter	Time	Plays	Yards	TOP	Team	Scoring information	NW	PUR
1	13:25				Purdue	Blocked punt returned 35 yards for touchdown by Rick Smith, Larry Sullivan kick good	0	7
1			2:02		Purdue	37-yard field goal by Larry Sullivan	0	10
1					Purdue	Rod Dennis 39-yard touchdown reception from Eric Hunter, Larry Sullivan kick good	0	17
1		2			Purdue	Larry Coleman 6-yard touchdown run, 2-point run good	0	25
1			1:02		Purdue	Rod Dennis 46-yard touchdown reception from Eric Hunter, Larry Sullivan kick good	0	32
2	7:38				Northwestern	Richard Buchanan 13-yard touchdown reception from Tim O'Brien, kick good	7	32
3	6:32				Northwestern	Greg Fischer 6-yard touchdown reception from Tim O'Brien, 2-point pass good	15	32
4	11:23				Purdue	Calvin Williams 44-yard touchdown reception from Eric Hunter, Larry Sullivan kick good	15	39
4	1:51				Purdue	Rod Dennis 57-yard touchdown reception from Jeff Lesniewicz, Larry Sullivan kick good	15	46
"TOP" = time of possession. For other American football terms, see Glossary of American football.							15	46

== Roster ==
1989 Northwestern Wildcats football team roster
Players
Coaches
Offense

Pos.	#	Name	Class
TE	82	Mike Allaway
WR	13	Mark Benson
WR	1	Richard Buchanan	Jr
G	66	Tobin Buckner
WR	6	Lester Carney
RB	34	Bob Christian	Jr
TE	84	David Cross
RB	22	Eric Dixon
WR	45	Greg Fischer
TE	86	Bob Griswold
OT	77	Stan Holsen
QB	4	Kip Kelly
QB	15	Kevin Krebs
WR	7	Randy McClellan
G	65	Todd McClish
C	61	Kurt Minko
WR	81	Chip Morris
WR	25	Pat New
FB	30	Butch Newhouse
QB	11	Tim O'Brien
RB	28	Steve Rosholt
RB	5	Terry Smith
G	62	Brian Tichy
OT	76	Derrill Vest
RB	46	Curt Zipfel

Defense

Pos.	#	Name	Class
DT	96	Darryl Ashmore
DE	85	Frank Boudreaux
DE	75	John Broeker
DB	20	David Eaton
DL	57	Ed Feaster
DL	44	Dan Freveletti
DB	24	Greg Gill
LB	60	Thomas Homco
DB	41	John Ivlow
DB	36	Dwight James
DL	91	Mike Lowe
LB	9	David Sanderson
LB, P	54	Ed Sutter
DB	47	Terry Thomas
DB	49	Sheridan Wilks
LB	33	Matt Witt

Special teams

Pos.	#	Name	Class
K	17	Ira Adler
P	14	Matt Dzierwa

Head coach

- Francis Peay

Coordinators/assistant coaches

Legend

- (C) Team captain
- (S) Suspended
- (I) Ineligible
- Injured
- Redshirt
