= Gissendaner =

Gissendaner is a surname. Notable people with the surname include:

- Kelly Gissendaner (1968–2015), American criminal
- Lee Gissendaner (born 1971), American football executive
