= 2004 Northwestern Wildcats football team =

American college football season

2004 Northwestern Wildcats football
- Conference: Big Ten Conference
- Record: 6–6 (5–3 Big Ten)
- Head coach: Randy Walker (6th season)
- Offensive coordinator: Mike Dunbar (3rd season)
- Offensive scheme: Spread
- Defensive coordinator: Greg Colby (3rd season)
- Base defense: 4–3
- Captains: John Pickens; Luis Castillo; Noah Herron; Matt Ulrich
- Home stadium: Ryan Field

2004 Big Ten Conference football standings
| | Conf. | | | Overall |
| Team | W | | L | W | | L |
|---|---|---|---|---|---|---|
| No. 14 Michigan $+ | 7 | – | 1 | 9 | – | 3 |
| No. 8 Iowa + | 7 | – | 1 | 10 | – | 2 |
| No. 17 Wisconsin | 6 | – | 2 | 9 | – | 3 |
| Northwestern | 5 | – | 3 | 6 | – | 6 |
| No. 20 Ohio State | 4 | – | 4 | 8 | – | 4 |
| Purdue | 4 | – | 4 | 7 | – | 5 |
| Michigan State | 4 | – | 4 | 5 | – | 7 |
| Minnesota | 3 | – | 5 | 7 | – | 5 |
| Penn State | 2 | – | 6 | 4 | – | 7 |
| Illinois | 1 | – | 7 | 3 | – | 8 |
| Indiana | 1 | – | 7 | 3 | – | 8 |
$ – BCS representative as conference champion; + – Conference co-champions; Rankings from AP Poll

The 2004 Northwestern Wildcats football team represented Northwestern University during the 2004 NCAA Division I-A football season. They played their home games at Ryan Field and participated as members of the Big Ten Conference. They were coached by Randy Walker. Despite concluding the season bowl eligible and securing third place in the conference standings, the team did not receive an invitation to a bowl game.

== Schedule ==
| Date | Time | Opponent | Site | TV | Result | Attendance |
|---|---|---|---|---|---|---|
| September 2 | 8:30 pm | at TCU* | Amon G. Carter Stadium; Fort Worth, TX | ESPN2 | L 45–48 ^{OT} | 26,843 |
| September 11 | 11:00 am | Arizona State* | Ryan Field; Evanston, IL | ESPN2 | L 21–30 | 21,939 |
| September 18 | 1:00 pm | Kansas* | Ryan Field; Evanston, IL | | W 20–17 | 24,817 |
| September 25 | 11:00 am | at No. 19 Minnesota | Hubert H. Humphrey Metrodome; Minneapolis, MN | ESPN2 | L 17–43 | 44,657 |
| October 2 | 8:00 pm | No. 7 Ohio State | Ryan Field; Evanston, IL | ESPN2 | W 33–27 ^{OT} | 47,130 |
| October 9 | 11:00 am | Indiana | Ryan Field; Evanston, IL | ESPN+ | W 31–24 ^{2OT} | 22,688 |
| October 23 | 11:00 am | at No. 6 Wisconsin | Camp Randall Stadium; Madison, WI | ESPN | L 12–24 | 82,468 |
| October 30 | 11:00 am | No. 21 Purdue^{†} | Ryan Field; Evanston, IL | ESPN | W 13–10 | 30,312 |
| November 6 | 11:00 am | at Penn State | Beaver Stadium; University Park, PA | ESPN+ | W 14–7 | 100,353 |
| November 13 | 11:00 am | at No. 7 Michigan | Michigan Stadium; Ann Arbor, MI (rivalry) | ABC | L 20–42 | 111,347 |
| November 20 | 11:00 am | Illinois | Ryan Field; Evanston, IL (Sweet Sioux Tomahawk) | ESPN+ | W 28–21 ^{OT} | 23,563 |
| November 27 | 11:00 pm | at Hawaii* | Aloha Stadium; Honolulu, HI | FSN | L 41–49 | 33,846 |
*Non-conference game; ^{†}Homecoming; Rankings from BCS Poll or AP Poll if BCS not available; All times are in Central time

== Roster ==
2004 Northwestern Wildcats football team roster
Players
Coaches
Offense

| Pos. | # | Name | Class |
|---|---|---|---|
| QB | 14 | Brett Basanez | Jr |
| OL | 76 | Trai Essex | Sr |
| RB | 33 | Noah Herron | Sr |
| OL | 60 | Ikechuku Ndukwe | Sr |
| OL | 63 | Zach Strief | Jr |
| OL | 64 | Matt Ulrich | Sr |

Defense

| Pos. | # | Name | Class |
|---|---|---|---|
| DT | 94 | Luis Castillo | Sr |
| DT | 67 | Barry Cofield | Jr |
| S | 20 | Marquice Cole | So |
| LB | 41 | Tim McGarigle | Jr |
| LB | 38 | Nick Roach | So |

Special teams

| Pos. | # | Name | Class |

Head coach

- Randy Walker

Coordinators/assistant coaches

Legend

- (C) Team captain
- (S) Suspended
- (I) Ineligible
- Injured
- Redshirt

== Game summaries ==
=== Ohio State ===
| Team | 1 | 2 | 3 | 4 | OT | Total |
|---|---|---|---|---|---|---|
| No. 7 Ohio State | 3 | 7 | 7 | 10 | 0 | 27 |
| • Northwestern | 3 | 10 | 7 | 7 | 6 | 33 |

- Date: October 2
- Location: Ryan Field, Evanston, IL
- Game start: 8:00 p.m. CST
- Game attendance: 47,130
- TV announcers (ESPN2): Eric Collins (Play-by-play), Andre Ware (Color) & Jimmy Dykes (Sideline)
- Source: ESPN

Scoring summary
| 1 | 9:24 | Northwestern | Brian Huffman 41 yard field goal | Northwestern 3-0 |
| 1 | 5:09 | Ohio St | Mike Nugent 34 yard field goal | Tie 3-3 |
| 2 | 13:39 | Northwestern | Noah Herron 14 yard pass from Brett Basanez (Brian Huffman kick) | Northwestern 10-3 |
| 2 | 3:18 | Ohio St | Santonio Holmes 63 yard punt return (Mike Nugent kick) | Tie 10-10 |
| 2 | :00 | Northwestern | Brian Huffman 40 yard field goal | Northwestern 13-10 |
| 3 | 11:35 | Northwestern | Mark Philmore 27 yard pass from Brett Basanez (Brian Huffman kick) | Northwestern 20-10 |
| 3 | 3:55 | Ohio St | Lydell Ross 2 yard run (Mike Nugent kick) | Northwestern 20-17 |
| 4 | 14:45 | Northwestern | Noah Herron 1 yard run (Brian Huffman kick) | Northwestern 27-17 |
| 4 | 8:46 | Ohio St | Mike Nugent 46 yard field goal | Northwestern 27-20 |
| 4 | 1:54 | Ohio St | Santonio Holmes 21 yard pass from Justin Zwick (Mike Nugent kick) | Tie 27-27 |
| OT | | Northwestern | Noah Herron 1 yard run | Northwestern 33-27 |

=== Purdue ===
| Team | 1 | 2 | 3 | 4 | Total |
|---|---|---|---|---|---|
| No. 21 Purdue | 10 | 0 | 0 | 0 | 10 |
| • Northwestern | 7 | 0 | 0 | 6 | 13 |

- Date: October 30
- Location: Ryan Field, Evanston, IL
- Game start: 11:00 a.m. CST
- Game attendance: 30,312
- TV announcers (ESPN): Mark Jones (Play-by-play), Bob Davie (Color) & Holly Rowe (Sideline)

Scoring summary
| 1 | 9:08 | NW | Terrell Jordan 14 yard run (Brian Huffman kick) | Northwestern 7–0 |
| 1 | 8:03 | PUR | Ben Jones 23 yard field goal | Northwestern 7–3 |
| 1 | 1:03 | PUR | Dorien Bryant 12 yard pass from Kyle Orton (Ben Jones kick) | Purdue 10–7 |
| 4 | :38 | NW | Noah Herron 3 yard run (kick failed) | Northwestern 13–10 |
