= Wilmington School District 209-U =

School district in Illinois, United States

Address
- 209U Wildcat Court Wilmington, Illinois, 60481; United States

District information
- Type: Public
- Grades: PreK–12
- NCES District ID: 1742630

Students and staff
- Students: 1,257

Other information
- Website: www.wilmington.will.k12.il.us

Wilmington School District 209-U is a school district located in Wilmington, Illinois, U.S.A., in Will County. Kevin Feeney is the district's superintendent.

The district operates the following schools:

- Wilmington High School
- Stevens Intermediate School (Grades 2 through 5)
- Bruning Elementary School (Pre-Kindergarten, Kindergarten, and Grade 1)
- Wilmington Middle School (Grades 6 through 8)
