= Zak Kustok =

American football player and businessman (born 1979)

Profile
- Position: Quarterback

Personal information
- Born: February 24, 1979 (age 47)
- Listed height: 6 ft 1 in (1.85 m)
- Listed weight: 203 lb (92 kg)

Career information
- High school: Orland Park (IL) Sandburg
- College: Notre Dame (1997–1998); Northwestern (1999–2001)
- NFL draft: 2002: undrafted

Career history
- Miami Dolphins (2002)*; Green Bay Packers (2003)*; Berlin Thunder (2003); Chicago Bears (2004)*
- * Offseason or practice squad member only

Zak Adam Kustok (born February 24, 1979) is an American businessman who was starting quarterback for the Northwestern Wildcats from 1999 to 2001. He originally matriculated at Notre Dame, but suffered from a change in the offensive game plan when Bob Davie replaced Lou Holtz, who had recruited him. Early in his second season in 1998 he left the program and joined Northwestern after its fifth game in 1999. Despite playing only two and a half seasons for Northwestern, he is the current Northwestern record holder for many quarterback rushing and passing statistics, including single season and career rushing touchdowns, career rushing yardage, career and single-season consecutive games with a touchdown pass and career consecutive pass attempts without an interception. He was a 2001 Johnny Unitas Golden Arm Award finalist.

== Early life ==
As a sophomore, Kustok led Lincoln-Way Central High School to a SICA West championship. By the time he was a sophomore during the 1994–95 school year, he was as well known as one of the best football prospects in the Chicago metropolitan area as he was as a scholar who ranked first in his class of 925 students. He also started at point guard on the basketball team.

In 1995 the Kustok family moved from Frankfort, Illinois to Orland Park, Illinois. Thus, as a junior, he transferred to Sandburg High School, and he led them to an 11–0 start to their season and a second round of the 1995 Class 6A playoffs win against Schaumburg High School before losing to Romeoville High School in the quarterfinals. Entering his senior season in 1996, he was the top-rated quarterback in the Chicago area and one of 9 local players ranked among the nation's top 100. Although he was a standout in football, he earned a Chicago Tribune prep athlete of the week award for his basketball performance both as a junior and as a senior. In the spring, before his senior season, he announced that he intended to attend Notre Dame. Kustok chose Notre Dame over Northwestern. Kustok earned the 1997 Tribune Scholar Athlete of the Year award from the Chicago Tribune.

Entering his senior season, USA Today rated him as one of the top 25 prospects in Illinois. That season, he again led Sandburg to the Class 6A football playoffs, but the team only went 6–4 as he endured injuries and an inexperienced offensive line. That season, he was an All-Area special mention athlete in both football and basketball. Although head coach Lou Holtz left Notre Dame following the 1996 season, Kustok remained committed to his replacement Bob Davie even though Ron Powlus decided not to enter the 1997 NFL draft. After his senior season, he was ranked as the second best quarterback (behind Antwaan Randle El) and seventh best football prospect in the Chicago area. In his 1997 senior spring, he won the regional competition for the Footaction High School Quarterback Challenge, which qualified him to compete at the Wide World of Sports Complex at Walt Disney World against 14 other high school quarterbacks.

== College career ==
Kustok spent the 1997 season as a quarterback for the scout team at Notre Dame. During 1998 Spring football, freshman Kustok found himself in a battle with junior Jarious Jackson, sophomore Eric Chappell, and incoming freshman Arnaz Battle for the starting role in a newly revamped option offense for the 1998 NCAA Division I-A football season. Kustok, like Powlus before him, was more of a drop back passer and suddenly found himself fourth on the depth chart at the beginning of the 1998 Notre Dame season. In late September, he decided to leave the program. While at the University of Notre Dame he was a Dean's List scholar with a 3.519 grade point average on a 4.0 scale. He transferred to Moraine Valley Junior College near his family in Orland Park. In December 1998, he committed to Kansas. However, Kansas received a commitment from Dylen Smith, and Kustok received offers from outgoing Northwestern coach Gary Barnett, who was transitioning to a new job as Colorado Buffaloes football head coach as well as an offer from Northwestern. In February 1999, Kustok committed to Northwestern. The following summer, incumbent quarterback Gavin Hoffman announced he was transferring to Penn.

Upon transferring the date of his athletic eligibility was contested because although by all accounts Kustok left Notre Dame on September 28, his transcripts were not registered an official date of October 21. This necessitated a request for court ordered emergency relief in the Cook County Circuit Court. He sought immediate eligibility which was denied. In mid-September the NCAA settled with Kustok and granted him eligibility for the October 2 game based on the September 28 date. Kustok made his debut after Northwestern fell behind Minnesota 14–0 in the game and head coach Randy Walker removed starter Nick Kreinbrink. The following week, he started against Indiana.

He was a 2001 finalist for the Johnny Unitas Golden Arm Award along with Joey Harrington, David Carr, Eric Crouch and Kurt Kittner. During that season as team co-captain and team MVP, he compiled a school-record and Big Ten-leading 3,272 yards of total offense, which ranked tenth in the nation. He was co-MVP of the 2000 Alamo Bowl along with Dan Alexander and Kyle Vanden Bosch of Nebraska.

Kustok graduated with the following Northwestern football records, many of which have been broken:

- single-season: total offense (3,272 in 2001; since broken by Mike Kafka in 2009), touchdown passes (20 in 2001, since broken by Brett Basanez in 2005), rush-pass plays (579 in 2001; since broken by Kafka), rushing touchdowns by a quarterback (11) and touchdowns responsible for (31 in 2001),
- career: consecutive games with a TD pass (24), consecutive passes without an interception (277), most 200-yard passing games (14, since broken by Brett Basanez in 2005), touchdowns responsible for (64), rushing yardage by a quarterback (1,294) and rushing touchdowns by a quarterback (22)

== Professional career ==
Kustok was signed by the Miami Dolphins as an undrafted free agent on April 26, 2002 following the 2002 NFL draft. He was waived on August 26 during initial roster cuts. After spending the 2002 season out of football, Kustok signed with the Green Bay Packers on February 7, 2003. He was allocated to NFL Europe on February 14 to play for the Berlin Thunder, and returned to the Packers on March 25. He was waived on June 17. Kustok was signed by the Chicago Bears to a two-year contract on March 26, 2004. He was released on May 2.

== Personal life ==
Kustok is the son of Allan and the late Anita Kustok, as well as the brother of YES sports reporter, Sarah Kustok. His wife Nicole (née Kuznia) was named Minnesota's 1999 Junior Miss and was also a cross country runner at Northwestern. In 2014, Zak graduated the University of Notre Dame with an M.B.A.

On September 29, 2010, Kustok's mother was shot and killed; his father Allan was accused of the homicide. Unlike his sister, Zak did not support his father at the trial. Allan was tried and convicted in February 2014; he was sentenced to 60 years in prison without eligibility for parole.
