= Wilmington High School (Illinois) =

Location
- 209 Wildcat Court; Wilmington, Illinois 60481; United States; 41°18′12″N 88°7′55″W

Information
- Type: Comprehensive public high school
- School district: Wilmington School District 209-U
- Superintendent: Matt Swick
- Principal: Scott Maupin
- Grades: 9–12
- Enrollment: 465 (2016-17)
- Campus size: 24 acres (9.7 ha)
- Area: South Suburbs
- Colors: Purple and white
- Athletics conference: Illinois Central Eight
- Mascot: Wildcats
- Website: https://www.209u.net/o/whs

Wilmington High School (or WHS) is a public four-year high school located in Wilmington, a southwest suburb of Chicago of the United States, in Will County. It is operated by Wilmington School District 209-U.

== Notable alumni ==
- Damien Anderson, NFL and CFL running back, Class of 1997
- Kiiara, singer, Class of 2013
- Tanner Roark, MLB pitcher, Class of 2005
