= Francis Peay =

American football player and coach (1944–2013)

No. 78, 71, 75
- Position: Offensive tackle

Personal information
- Born: May 23, 1944; Pittsburgh, Pennsylvania, U.S.
- Died: September 21, 2013 (aged 69); St. Louis, Missouri, U.S.
- Listed height: 6 ft 5 in (1.96 m)
- Listed weight: 250 lb (113 kg)

Career information
- High school: Schenley (Pittsburgh)
- College: Arizona (1962); Cameron (1963); Missouri (1964-1965)
- NFL draft: 1966: 1st round, 10th overall pick
- AFL draft: 1966: 2nd round, 15th overall pick

Career history

Playing
- New York Giants (1966–1967); Green Bay Packers (1968–1972); Kansas City Chiefs (1973–1974)

Coaching
- Notre Dame (1977–1978) Assistant coach; California (1979–1981) Linebackers coach & defensive line coach; Northwestern (1981–1984) Linebackers coach; Northwestern (1985) Defensive coordinator; Northwestern (1986–1991) Head coach; Indianapolis Colts (1992–1993) Defensive line coach

Awards and highlights
- Second-team All-American (1965); First-team All-Big Eight (1965)

Career NFL statistics
- Games played: 103
- Games started: 63
- Fumble recoveries: 1
- Stats at Pro Football Reference

Head coaching record
- Career: 13–51–2 (.212)

Francis G. Peay (May 23, 1944 – September 21, 2013) was an American football offensive tackle and head coach. William N. Wallace of the New York Times once described him as "an intelligent beautifully constructed athlete".

== Early life ==
Peay was born on May 23, 1944, in Pittsburgh, Pennsylvania, the son of Francis Sr. and Amy Peay. He attended Schenley High School, located in Pittsburgh's Oakland neighborhood. As a junior, he played center on the football team, at 6 ft 1 in (1.85 m), 185 pounds (83.9 kg). As a senior, he was a 200-pound or 210-pound tackle. He was named to the 1961 All-City (Pittsburgh) League team at guard. Schenley did not win any football games during his freshman and sophomore years, but in his senior year it only lost one game. As a high school player, Peay idolized New York Giants' Hall of Fame offensive tackle Rosey Brown (who retired the year before Peay joined the Giants).

Among other notable people who attended Schenley before it closed are National Football League (NFL) running back Larry Brown, artist Andy Warhol, Nobel Prize winner Clifford Shull, musician George Benson, Harvard's first black tenured professor Derrick Bell, National Basketball Association star Maurice Lucas, and professional wrestler Bruno Sammartino.

== College ==
Peay received an athletic scholarship to the University of Arizona, but then transferred to Cameron State Agricultural College (now Cameron University) in Lawton, Oklahoma, playing college football (1963-64) as an offensive right tackle at 6 ft 5 in (1.96 m) 230 pounds (104.3 kg). While at Cameron, his team had an 8–2 record and averaged just over 230 rushing yards per game, mostly running the ball behind Peay as a blocker.

Peay later transferred to the University of Missouri, where he played under head coach Dan Devine. He was an All-American and All-Big Eight offensive tackle as a senior at Missouri, and his team was ranked third in the nation in rushing. He played in the Senior Bowl and 1966 Sugar Bowl (a 20–18 Missouri victory over the University of Florida). He was a first-team Time All-American as selected by 22 professional scouts.

== Professional football ==
Peay was selected in the first round of the 1966 NFL draft by the New York Giants (10th overall). The Kansas City Chiefs selected him in the second round of the 1966 American Football League draft (15th overall). Recently retired Giant Rosey Brown befriended Peay during the college all-star camp, and had Peay to his home.

As a professional, his playing weight was 250 pounds (113.4 kg). He played two seasons for the Giants (1966-67), starting eight games as a rookie at right tackle, but fracturing a bone in his foot during the second half of his rookie season. He only started two games in 1967, playing behind Charlie Harper at offensive tackle. He had a knee injury in training camp and chronic foot issues that delayed his development. He had never been injured before in high school or college.

Before the start of the 1968 season, the Giants traded Peay to the Green Bay Packers for linebacker Tommy Crutcher and offensive lineman Steve Wright. The Packers' general manager trading for Peay was Hall of fame legend Vince Lombardi. He started only one game in 1968, but was the Packers starting left offensive tackle from 1969-71. After an argument with Packer assistant coaches during training camp in 1971, Peay cleared out his locker and left the team, but came back to start all 14 games that season.

Peay was injured in the Packers second game of the 1972 season against the Oakland Raiders. He later lost his starting job to Bill Hayhoe. Peay was traded to the Chiefs after the 1972 season for defensive end Aaron Brown, and started nine games at right tackle for the Chiefs in 1973, after starter Dave Hill suffered a leg injury. Peay played in 10 games for the Chiefs in 1974, but started only one. Peay announced his retirement after the Chiefs traded him to the New Orleans Saints for a draft pick in July 1975.

== Coaching career ==
When his playing career ended, Peay became an assistant coach at the University of Notre Dame for two years, under his former Missouri coach Dan Devine, beginning as coach of the freshman team in 1976. He then coached the defensive line and outside linebackers at the University of California for three years.

Peay next served as an assistant coach at Northwestern University under Dennis Green (1981-85). Peay worked his way up from linebacker coach to defensive coordinator. After Green left for the San Francisco 49ers, Peay became Northwestern's head football coach (1986-91). His four-win season in 1986 was the team's best performance in over a decade, though various structural problems in the football program limited the opportunity for any significant improvement in the near future.

He was the second black head coach in the Big Ten Conference, after his predecessor Green. His coaching record at Northwestern was 13 wins, 51 losses, and two ties. This ranks him 12th at Northwestern in total wins and 24th at Northwestern in winning percentage. His record was superior to his predecessors, Rick Venturi (1–31–1 from 1978-80) and Green (10–45 from 1981-85), both of whom became NFL head coaches. He was succeeded at Northwestern in 1992 by Gary Barnett. After leaving Northwestern, he spent two seasons as the defensive line coach under head coach Ted Marchibroda and defensive coordinator Rick Venturi for the Indianapolis Colts.

== Honors ==
In 1990 he was named to Missouri's All-Century team, and in 1991, Peay was inducted into the University of Missouri Athletics Hall of Fame. In 2017, he was inducted into the Cameron Athletics Hall of Fame.

== Death ==
Peay died on September 21, 2013, at the age of 69.

== Head coaching record ==
Year	Team	Overall	Conference	Standing	Bowl/playoffs
Northwestern Wildcats (Big Ten Conference) (1986–1991)
1986	Northwestern	4–7	2–6	T–8th	
1987	Northwestern	2–8–1	2–6	9th	
1988	Northwestern	2–8–1	2–5–1	T–7th	
1989	Northwestern	0–11	0–8	10th	
1990	Northwestern	2–9	1–7	T–8th	
1991	Northwestern	3–8	2–6	T–8th	
Northwestern:		13–51–2	9–38–1		
Total:		13–51–2			
