= Dan Persa =

American football player (born 1988)

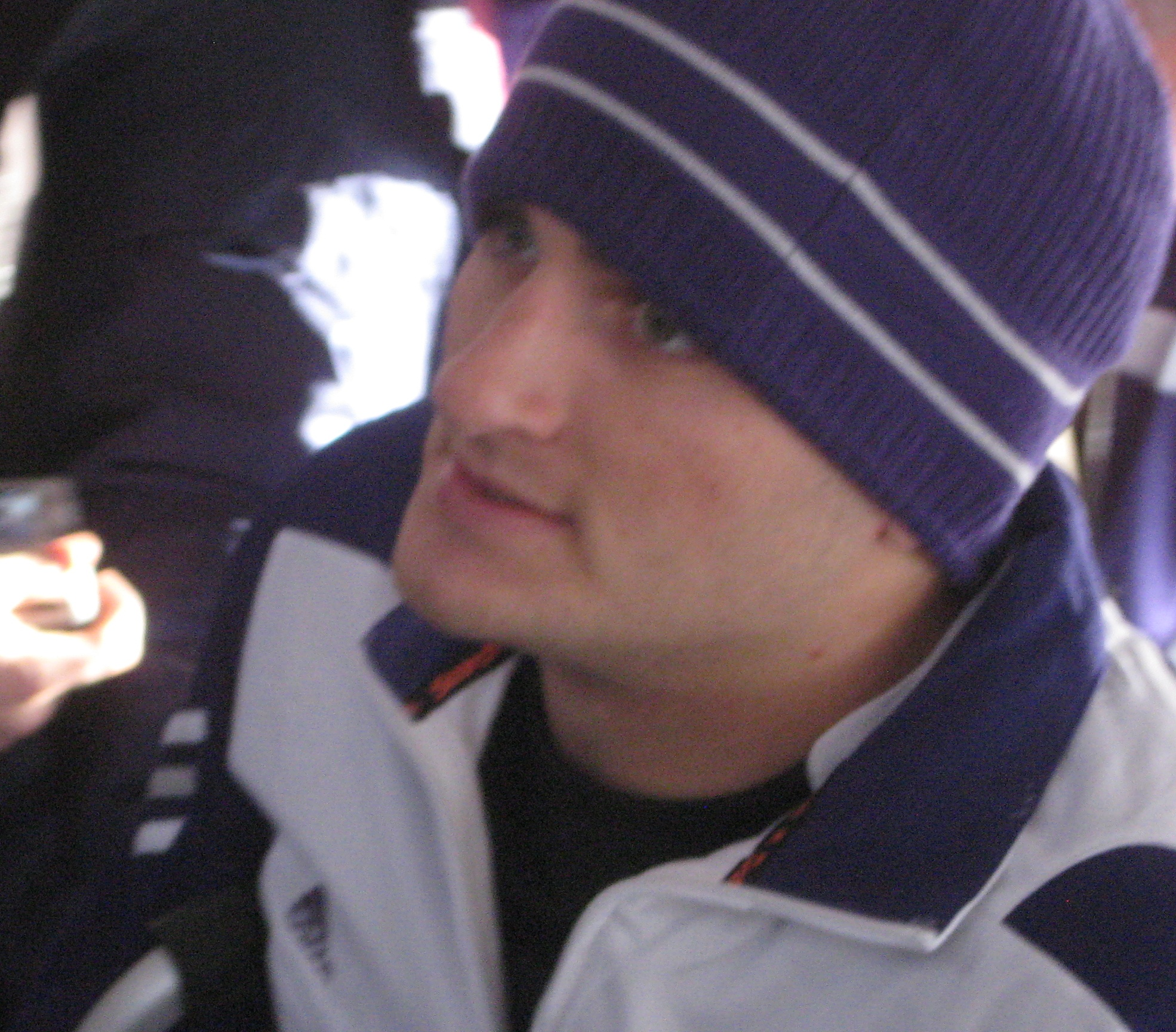

No. 7
- Position: Quarterback

Personal information
- Born: November 20, 1988 (age 37); Bethlehem, Pennsylvania, U.S.
- Listed height: 5 ft 11 in (1.80 m)
- Listed weight: 210 lb (95 kg)

Career information
- High school: Bethlehem (PA) Liberty
- College: Northwestern

Daniel Vaughn Persa (born November 20, 1988) is an American former college football quarterback who played for the Northwestern Wildcats. He attended Liberty High School in Bethlehem, Pennsylvania.

== Early life ==
Persa was born on November 20, 1988, to parents Dan Sr. and Jane Persa in Bethlehem, Pennsylvania. His mother and sister both graduated from Pennsylvania State University, resulting in Persa wishing to play for the Nittany Lions as a child.

While attending Liberty High School, Persa played football for three years and competed on their track and field team as a sprinter. As a football player, Persa became the first Pennsylvania high school student to throw over 2,000 yards and rush over 1,000. Off the field, Persa maintained a 4.3 GPA and volunteered with the Special Olympics and local youth programs.

In his senior year of high school, Persa committed to Northwestern University on June 23, 2006. He chose to attend Northwestern over football scholarships from the University of Akron, the University of Connecticut, Temple University, and the West Virginia University. Upon graduating, he was ranked 93rd nationally by ESPN/Scouts, Inc. and received 2006 Pennsylvania 4A A.P. Player of the Year. In 2017, he was inducted into the National Football Foundation Lehigh Valley Chapter Hall of Fame.

=== Recruitment ===
College recruiting
Name	Hometown	School	Height	Weight	40^{‡}	Commit date
Dan Persa; QB	Bethlehem, Pennsylvania	Liberty High School	6 ft 2 in (1.88 m)	201 lb (91 kg)	4.58	Jun 23, 2006
Dan Persa; QB	Recruit ratings: Scout: Rivals:					
Overall recruit ranking: Scout: 71 (QB) Rivals: 22 (QB), 33 (PA)
‡ Refers to 40-yard dash; Note: In many cases, Scout, Rivals, 247Sports, On3, and ESPN may conflict in their listings of height, weight and 40 time.; In these cases, the average was taken. ESPN grades are on a 100-point scale.; Sources: "2006 Team Ranking". Rivals.com.

== College career ==
=== 2010 ===
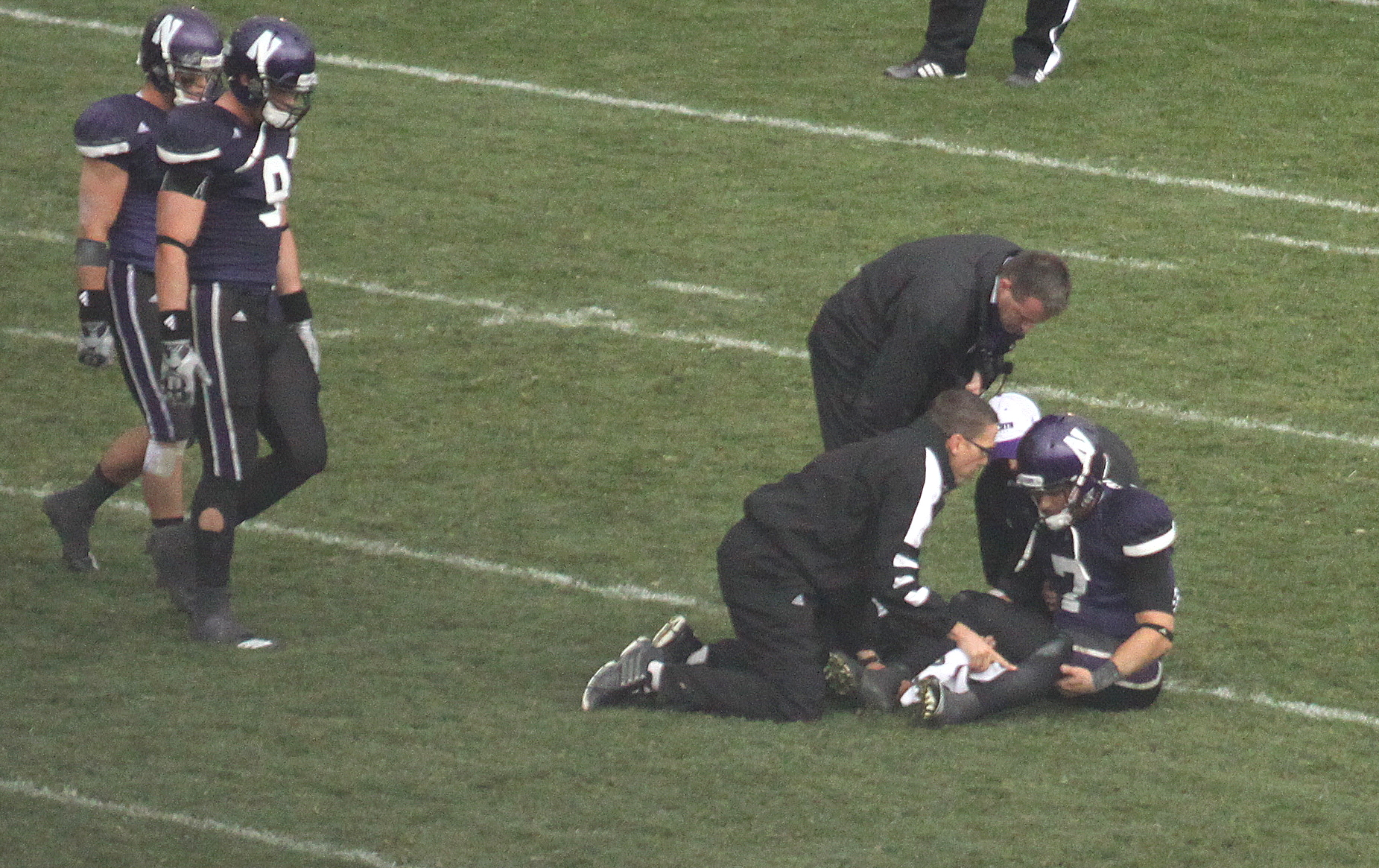
Persa ruptured his Achilles tendon while throwing the game-winning pass

Persa became Northwestern's starting quarterback in 2010 following Mike Kafka's graduation. In the season-opener against Vanderbilt, Persa went 19-for-21 and passed for three touchdowns. In week 2 against the Illinois State Redbirds, Persa went 19-for-23 and passed for 240 yards and two touchdowns.

On November 13 against the Iowa Hawkeyes, Persa went 32-for-43 for 318 yards, two touchdowns and one interception. After throwing a 20-yard touchdown pass to Demetrius Fields to win the game in the fourth quarter, Persa suffered an Achilles tendon rupture that required season-ending surgery to repair the injury. Evan Watkins replaced him at quarterback for the remainder of the season. Persa finished the season with 2,581 passing yards and 15 touchdowns.

In the 2010 season Persa set the Big Ten single-season record for completion percentage at 73.5%.

=== 2011 ===
Northwestern started a campaign for Persa for the Heisman Trophy before the 2011 season by promoting the slogan "Persa Strong" on billboards in Bristol, Connecticut, and Chicago. Bruce Feldman of ESPN.com had called Persa the strongest quarterback in the country. Persa bench pressed 365 pounds (166 kg), squatted 520 pounds (240 kg), and hang cleaned 315 pounds (143 kg).

He sat out the 2011 season-opener against Boston College on September 3, with Kain Colter starting in his place. Northwestern took Persa's Heisman billboards down on September 9; the University said that the billboard campaign was scheduled to end after one month and it had nothing to do with his injury. He missed the next two games of the season, and, as a result of the injury, stayed in the passing pocket more than he did in 2010. Following the season he participated in the 2012 East–West Shrine Game on January 21, 2012.

== Professional career ==
Pre-draft measurables
Height	Weight	40-yard dash	10-yard split	20-yard split	20-yard shuttle	Three-cone drill	Vertical jump	Broad jump
5 ft 11 1/8 in (1.81 m)	210 lb (95 kg)	4.57 s	1.59 s	2.72 s	4.36 s	7.11 s	32 in (0.81 m)	8 ft 11 in (2.72 m)
All values from Northwestern Pro Day on March 8, 2012.

After going undrafted in the 2012 NFL draft, Persa received a tryout with the Tampa Bay Buccaneers during the team's rookie mini-camp in May 2012. He injured his ankle during a practice, and the Indianapolis Colts medical team that examined him also diagnosed him with a second Achilles tear that required surgery. The surgery prevented him from playing in 2012.

== Post-playing career ==
After failing to enter the NFL, Persa began working as an intern for Duke Realty Corporation under former NU quarterback Steve Schnur and in sales at IT firm Computer Aid Inc. He was hired by real estate company CBRE Group in 2014. He was also hired to do color commentary for one Northwestern spring football game on April 5, 2014. On September 27, 2025, Persa filled in for Ted Albrecht on color commentary for the WGN Radio broadcast of Northwestern's 17-14 win over UCLA. During the season, Persa co-hosts a podcast with Northwestern play-by-play broadcaster Dave Eanet called Collegiately Speaking in which the pair break down the previous week's Wildcats' game and preview the next matchup.
