= Kain Colter =

American football player (born 1990)

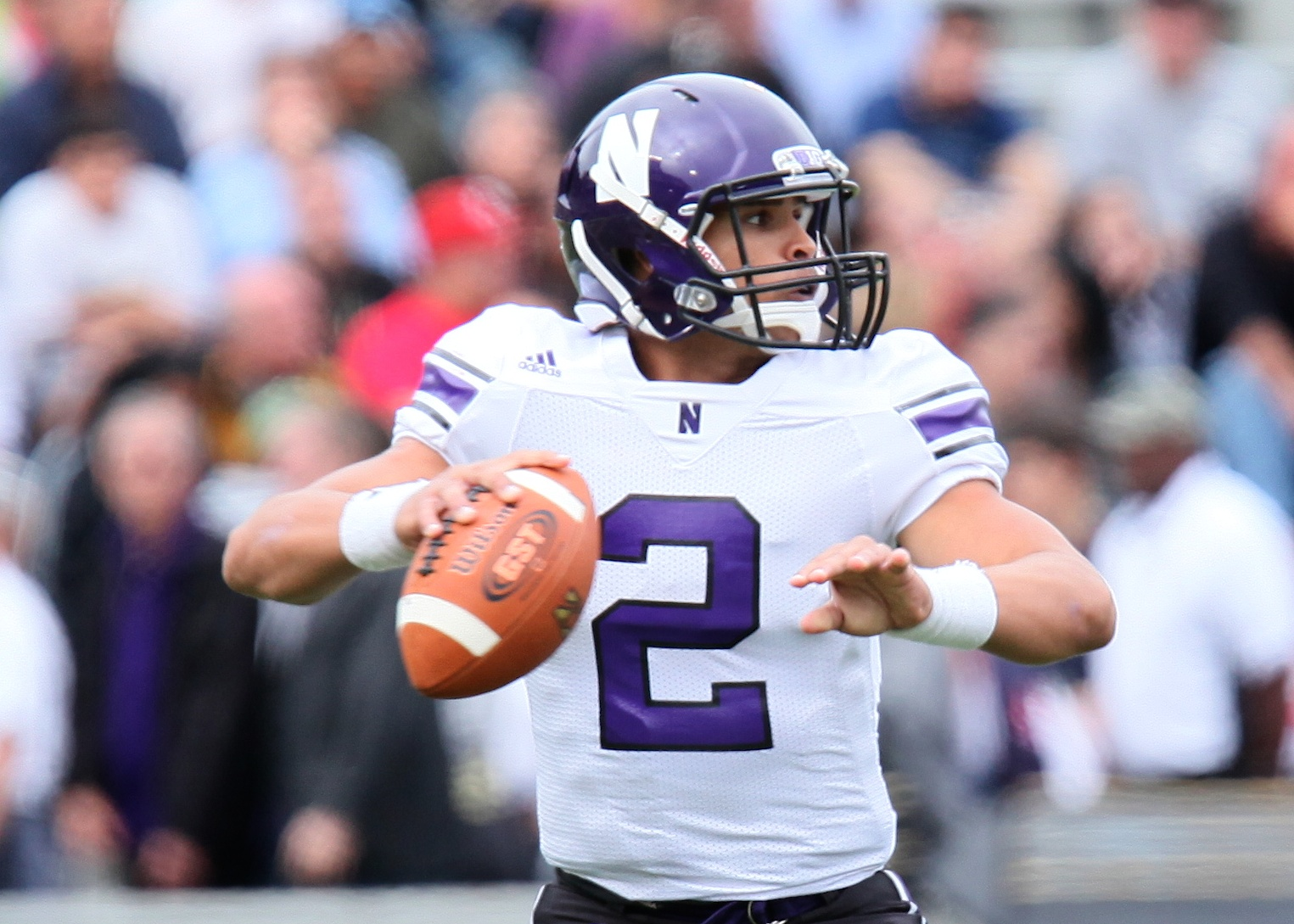
- Colter with Northwestern in 2011

No. 2, 13
- Positions: Quarterback, wide receiver

Personal information
- Born: October 3, 1990 (age 36); Denver, Colorado, U.S.
- Listed height: 5 ft 11 in (1.80 m)
- Listed weight: 198 lb (90 kg)

Career information
- High school: Cherry Creek (Greenwood Village, Colorado)
- College: Northwestern
- NFL draft: 2014: undrafted

Career history
- Minnesota Vikings (2014)*; Los Angeles Rams (2016)*; Buffalo Bills (2016)*
- * Offseason or practice squad member only
- Stats at Pro Football Reference

Theodis Kain Colter (born October 3, 1990) is an American former college football player who played multiple positions for the Northwestern Wildcats, mostly as a quarterback and wide receiver. He was later a member of the Minnesota Vikings, Los Angeles Rams, and Buffalo Bills.

== Early life ==
Colter attended Cherry Creek High School in Denver, Colorado, where he was the team captain and a four-year letterwinner. He was also a three-time All-Centennial League selection. As a sophomore, he threw for 2,073 yards, ran for 463 and had 25 touchdowns. Playing a full season as a junior, he led the Bruins (11–3 in 2008) to the 5A state championship game as he threw for 1,786 yards, ran for 937 and accounted for 31 touchdowns. As a senior, he missed eight-plus games with a shoulder injury that limited his throwing, but still managed to finish with 907 passing yards and 978 rushing yards with 16 total touchdowns. In the quarterfinal game vs. defending state champ Grandview High School, he ran 36 yards for the game-winning double OT score on a third-and-goal play. Colter also lettered three years in basketball (playing point guard) and four years in track & field (competing in long jump and triple jump).

As a high school senior at Cherry Creek High School, Colter was rated as a three-star quarterback prospect by Rivals.com. He was an All-Region quarterback according to SuperPrep All-Midlands, PrepStar All-Midlands Region and Rivals.com. He was ranked 52nd nationally among all athletes by Rivals.com, 49th nationally among all quarterbacks by SuperPrep and 56th regionally (nine states) among all players by SuperPrep. He also ranked seventh among all players in the state of Colorado by Rivals.com and SuperPrep.

College recruiting
Name	Hometown	School	Height	Weight	40^{‡}	Commit date
Kain Colter; QB	Englewood, Colorado	Cherry Creek High School	6 ft 1 in (1.85 m)	185 lb (84 kg)	4.6	Jan 14, 2010
Kain Colter; QB	Recruit ratings: Scout: Rivals:					
Overall recruit ranking: Scout: 49 (QB) Rivals: 52 (QB), 7 (CO)
‡ Refers to 40-yard dash; Note: In many cases, Scout, Rivals, 247Sports, On3, and ESPN may conflict in their listings of height, weight and 40 time.; In these cases, the average was taken. ESPN grades are on a 100-point scale.; Sources: "2010 Team Ranking". Rivals.com.

Colter committed to Northwestern University on January 14, 2010. Colter also received football scholarships from Air Force, Akron, Arizona State, Colorado, Colorado State and Stanford.

In 2009, Kain Colter led a comeback against the then #1 Columbine High School Rebels, which ended in a game-winning field goal. He then moved to the 5A Colorado High School Championship Game against Mullen High School.

== College career ==
=== 2010 ===
As a true freshman, Colter made his first college start for the Wildcats, as a slotback, in the 2011 TicketCity Bowl.

=== 2011 ===
As a sophomore, Colter was slated to be the backup quarterback to Dan Persa, as Persa was questionable for the team's opening game with an Achilles tendon injury. In the opening game against Boston College, Persa was not healthy enough to start, and Colter became the starting quarterback, leading the Wildcats to a 24–17 victory over the Eagles of Boston College. The Wildcats' head coach, Pat Fitzgerald, said that once Persa returns, Colter will be used as a running back, wide receiver and Wildcat quarterback.

=== Statistics ===
Season	Team	Passing							Rushing			Receiving		
Season	Team	Cmp	Att	Pct	Yds	TD	Int	Rtg	Att	Yds	TD	Rec	Yds	TD
2010	Northwestern	3	9	33.3	38	0	1	46.6	29	143	2	1	32	0
2011	Northwestern	55	82	67.1	673	6	1	157.7	135	654	9	43	466	3
2012	Northwestern	101	149	67.8	872	8	4	129.3	170	894	12	16	169	0
2013	Northwestern	64	82	78.0	583	4	3	146.6	115	489	5	3	16	0
Totals		223	322	69.3	2,166	18	9	138.6	449	2,180	28	63	683	3

=== 2014 ===
In 2014, Colter led efforts to unionize the Northwestern Wildcats football team. The National Labor Relations Board dismissed the team's union petition in August 2015.

== Professional career ==
Colter went undrafted in the 2014 NFL draft but was later signed by the Minnesota Vikings as a wide receiver and running back. Colter did not make the Vikings' 53-man roster, but he made the practice squad.

On February 9, 2016, Colter signed with the Los Angeles Rams, but was subsequently released.

On August 1, 2016, the Buffalo Bills announced that they signed Colter. On September 2, 2016, he was released by the Bills as part of final roster cuts.

== Personal life ==
His great uncle, Jeff Colter, was also a member of the Vikings. Colter is also a co-founder of the College Athletes Players Association, or CAPA, which is a labor organization established to assert college athletes' status as employees with the right to collectively bargain for basic protections.
