= Eric Peterman =

American football player (born 1986)

No. 11, 86
- Position: Wide receiver

Personal information
- Born: November 18, 1986 (age 39); Springfield, Illinois, U.S.
- Listed height: 6 ft 1 in (1.85 m)
- Listed weight: 200 lb (91 kg)

Career information
- High school: Sacred Heart-Griffin
- College: Northwestern
- NFL draft: 2009: undrafted

Career history
- Chicago Bears (2009–2011)*
- * Offseason or practice squad member only

Awards and highlights
- 2008 ARA Sportsmanship Award

Eric Peterman (born November 18, 1986) is an American former football wide receiver. He was signed by the Chicago Bears as an undrafted free agent in 2009. He attended Sacred Heart-Griffin High school in Springfield, Illinois and excelled at the quarterback position. He played college football at Northwestern as a wide receiver. After his college career, Peterman played in the NFL with the Chicago Bears. He set up a company, GRNE Solar.

== College career ==
In 2008, he was named the winner of the ARA Sportsmanship Award, presented by the Awards and Recognition Association to the Division I football player who best exhibits sportsmanship both on and off the field.

Receiving	G	Rec	Yds	TD	Avg
2005	12	12	181	2	15.1
2006	12	23	349	1	15.2
2007	12	66	744	3	11.3
2008	13	59	737	6	12.5
Total	49	160	2,011	12	12.6

== Professional career ==
=== Chicago Bears ===
Peterman was signed by the Chicago Bears as an undrafted free agent in 2009. He was cut by the Bears on September 5 and was re-signed to the practice squad on December 30. He was re-signed to a one-year contract on February 22, 2010. Peterman continued with the Bears and was injured during a pre-season game against the Oakland Raiders on August 21, 2010. Peterman's injury required surgery and he was waived/injured on August 23, 2010. Peterman was resigned to the Chicago Bears in early 2011. After coaching changes ensued after the season, he was not resigned for the 2011 season.

=== GRNE Solar ===
Peterman is the CEO and founder of GRNE Solutions, LLC dba GRNE Solar, founded in 2012. In July 2022 GRNE Solar was acquired by Nelnet Inc. The new entity is titled GRNE-Nelnet, LLC and goes by the trade name Nelnet Renewable Energy (NRE).
