= 1999 Indiana Hoosiers football team =

American college football season

1999 Indiana Hoosiers football
- Conference: Big Ten Conference
- Record: 4–7 (3–5 Big Ten)
- Head coach: Cam Cameron (3rd season)
- Offensive coordinator: Pete Schmidt (3rd season)
- Defensive coordinator: Jon Heacock (3rd season)
- MVP: Antwaan Randle El
- Captains: Adewale Ogunleye; Antwaan Randle El; Craig Robeen
- Home stadium: Memorial Stadium

1999 Big Ten Conference football standings
	Conf.			Overall
Team	W		L	W		L
No. 4 Wisconsin $	7	–	1	10	–	2
No. 7 Michigan State	6	–	2	10	–	2
No. 5 Michigan %	6	–	2	10	–	2
No. 11 Penn State	5	–	3	10	–	3
No. 18 Minnesota	5	–	3	8	–	4
No. 24 Illinois	4	–	4	8	–	4
No. 25 Purdue	4	–	4	7	–	5
Ohio State	3	–	5	6	–	6
Indiana	3	–	5	4	–	7
Northwestern	1	–	7	3	–	8
Iowa	0	–	8	1	–	10
$ – BCS representative as conference champion; % – BCS at-large representative; Rankings from AP Poll

The 1999 Indiana Hoosiers football team represented Indiana University Bloomington during the 1999 NCAA Division I-A football season. They participated as members of the Big Ten Conference. The Hoosiers played their home games in Memorial Stadium in Bloomington, Indiana. The team was coached by Cam Cameron in his third year as head coach.

== Schedule ==
Date	Time	Opponent	Site	TV	Result	Attendance	Source
September 4	6:00 pm	Ball State*	Memorial Stadium; Bloomington, IN		W 21–9	31,238	
September 11	6:00 pm	North Carolina*	Memorial Stadium; Bloomington, IN		L 30–42	30,249	
September 18	11:00 am	Kentucky*	Memorial Stadium; Bloomington, IN (rivalry)	ESPN	L 35–44	39,146	
September 25	12:00 pm	at No. 2 Penn State	Beaver Stadium; University Park, PA	ESPN	L 24–45	96,146	
October 2	11:00 am	Illinois	Memorial Stadium; Bloomington, IN (rivalry)	ESPN2	W 34–31 ^{OT}	30,381	
October 9	1:00 pm	Northwestern^{†}	Memorial Stadium; Bloomington, IN		W 34–17	30,101	
October 16	11:00 am	at No. 17 Wisconsin	Camp Randall Stadium; Madison, WI	ESPN	L 0–59	78,243	
October 23	1:00 pm	at Iowa	Kinnick Stadium; Iowa City, IA		W 38–31	63,777	
October 30	12:00 pm	No. 15 Michigan	Memorial Stadium; Bloomington, IN	ESPN2	L 31–34	41,516	
November 13	12:00 pm	at No. 20 Minnesota	Hubert H. Humphrey Metrodome; Minneapolis, MN	ESPN Plus	L 20–44	47,852	
November 20	12:00 pm	No. 19 Purdue	Memorial Stadium; Bloomington, IN (Old Oaken Bucket)	ESPN	L 24–30	51,344	
*Non-conference game; ^{†}Homecoming; Rankings from AP Poll released prior to the game; All times are in Eastern time

== Roster ==
1999 Indiana Hoosiers football team roster
Players
Coaches
Offense

Pos.	#	Name	Class
G	76	Nate DeArmond	So
G	70	Enoch DeMar	Fr
QB	17	Gibran Hamdan	Fr
QB	7	Earl Haniford	Jr
QB	11	Antwaan Randle El	So

Defense

Pos.	#	Name	Class
LB	49	Robert Brown	Jr
LB	94	Tony Brown	Jr
S	13	Johnny Anderson	Jr
LB	85	Stephen Anthony	Fr
DL	7	James Atkins	Jr
DE	93	Adewale Ogunleye	Sr
DB	10	Curtis Randle El	Sr
DE	92	Kemp Rasmussen	So
LB	50	Travis Rinnert	Fr

Special teams

Pos.	#	Name	Class

Head coach

- Cam Cameron

Coordinators/assistant coaches

Legend

- (C) Team captain
- (S) Suspended
- (I) Ineligible
- Injured
- Redshirt

Roster
