= Kevin Bentley =

American football player (born 1979)

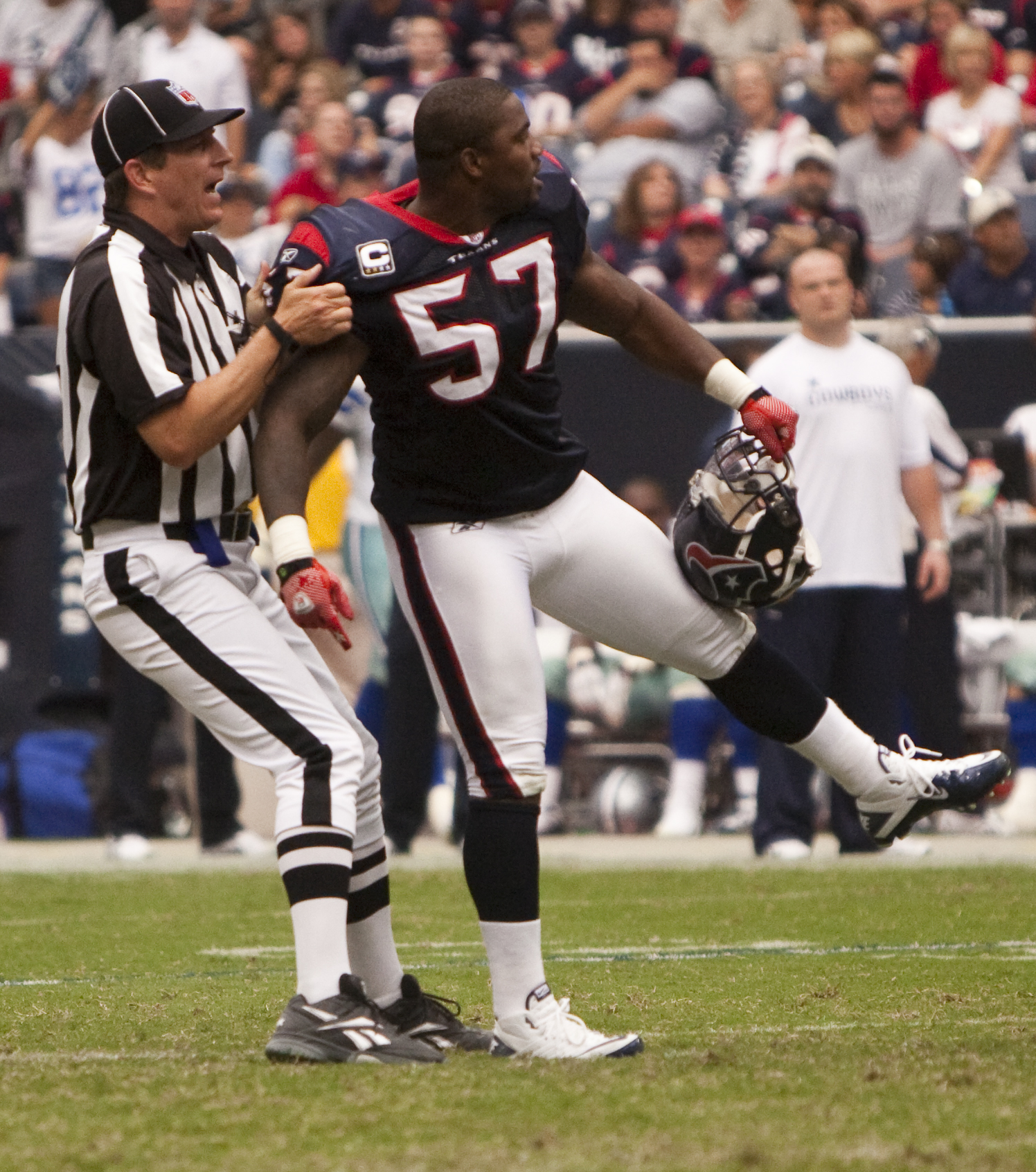
- Bentley with the Houston Texans in 2010

No. 57
- Position: Linebacker

Personal information
- Born: December 29, 1979 (age 46); Los Angeles, California, U.S.
- Listed height: 6 ft 0 in (1.83 m)
- Listed weight: 248 lb (112 kg)

Career information
- High school: Montclair (Los Angeles)
- College: Northwestern
- NFL draft: 2002: 4th round, 101st overall pick

Career history
- Cleveland Browns (2002–2004); Seattle Seahawks (2005–2007); Houston Texans (2008–2010); San Diego Chargers (2011)*; Jacksonville Jaguars (2011); Indianapolis Colts (2011)
- * Offseason or practice squad member only

Awards and highlights
- 2× Second-team All-Big Ten (1999, 2001)

Career NFL statistics
- Total tackles: 421
- Sacks: 1
- Forced fumbles: 2
- Fumble recoveries: 5
- Interceptions: 2
- Stats at Pro Football Reference

Kevin Kinte Bentley (born December 29, 1979) is an American former professional football player who was a linebacker in the National Football League (NFL). He was selected by the Cleveland Browns in the fourth round of the 2002 NFL draft. He played college football for the Northwestern Wildcats. Bentley was also a member of the Seattle Seahawks, Houston Texans, San Diego Chargers, Jacksonville Jaguars and Indianapolis Colts.

== Early life ==
Kevin Kinte Bentley was born on December 29, 1979, in Los Angeles, California. He attended Montclair College Preparatory School in Los Angeles.

== College career ==
In 2000 Bentley and Northwestern won a share for the Big Ten champion with Michigan and Purdue. Bentley helped lead Northwestern to their first bowl game since the 1997 Florida Citrus Bowl. They went on to face off against Nebraska in the 2000 Alamo Bowl, though they ended up losing by a score of 66–17.

== Professional career ==
=== Cleveland Browns ===
Bentley was selected by the Cleveland Browns in the fourth round, with the 101st overall pick, of the 2002 NFL draft. He officially signed with the team on July 16, 2002. He became a free agent after the 2004 season.

=== Seattle Seahawks ===
Bentley signed a contract with Seattle Seahawks in the 2005 season. He helped the Seahawks advance to the NFC Championship Game and beat the Carolina Panthers by a score of 34–14. They faced the Pittsburgh Steelers in Super Bowl XL, and lost by a score of 21–10. He became a free agent after the 2007 season.

=== Houston Texans ===
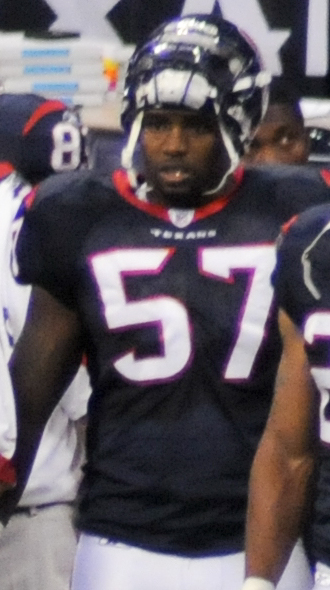
Bentley with the Texans in 2010

Bentley signed a free agent contract with the Houston Texans on March 2, 2008. He became a free agent on July 26, 2011.

=== San Diego Chargers ===
On August 24, 2011, Bentley signed with the San Diego Chargers. He was released during final cuts.

=== Jacksonville Jaguars ===
The Jacksonville Jaguars signed Bentley on November 22, 2011. He was released on December 5.

=== Indianapolis Colts ===
On December 6, 2011, he was signed by the Indianapolis Colts.

Bentley retired after the 2011 season.

== Career statistics ==
=== NFL ===
Legend
**Bold**	Career high

==== Regular season ====
Year	Team	Games		Tackles					Interceptions					Fumbles			
Year	Team	GP	GS	Cmb	Solo	Ast	Sck	TFL	Int	Yds	TD	Lng	PD	FF	FR	Yds	TD
2002	CLE	12	0	39	24	15	0.0	0	0	0	0	0	1	0	**2**	0	0
2003	CLE	**16**	**14**	**96**	**60**	**36**	0.0	1	**1**	**25**	0	**25**	2	0	0	0	0
2004	CLE	**16**	3	63	44	19	0.0	2	0	0	0	0	0	**1**	0	0	0
2005	SEA	15	3	33	28	5	0.0	2	0	0	0	0	1	0	0	0	0
2006	SEA	14	0	27	19	8	0.0	1	0	0	0	0	**3**	**1**	1	0	0
2007	SEA	14	2	27	21	6	0.0	0	0	0	0	0	0	0	0	0	0
2008	HOU	**16**	7	57	38	19	**1.0**	**4**	0	0	0	0	1	0	1	0	0
2009	HOU	**16**	0	21	10	11	0.0	0	0	0	0	0	0	0	0	0	0
2010	HOU	13	8	55	35	20	0.0	3	**1**	18	0	18	1	0	1	**8**	0
2011	JAX	1	0	1	1	0	0.0	0	0	0	0	0	0	0	0	0	0
2011	IND	3	0	2	0	2	0.0	0	0	0	0	0	0	0	0	0	0
		136	37	421	280	141	1.0	13	2	43	0	25	9	2	5	8	0

==== Playoffs ====
Year	Team	Games		Tackles					Interceptions					Fumbles			
Year	Team	GP	GS	Cmb	Solo	Ast	Sck	TFL	Int	Yds	TD	Lng	PD	FF	FR	Yds	TD
2002	CLE	1	0	**4**	**4**	0	0.0	0	0	0	0	0	0	0	0	0	0
2005	SEA	**3**	0	3	2	**1**	0.0	0	0	0	0	0	0	0	0	0	0
2006	SEA	2	0	1	1	0	0.0	0	0	0	0	0	0	0	0	0	0
2007	SEA	2	0	**4**	**4**	0	0.0	0	0	0	0	0	0	0	0	0	0
		8	0	12	11	1	0.0	0	0	0	0	0	0	0	0	0	0

=== College ===
Year	Team	GP	Def Int						Fumbles		
Year	Team	GP	Int	Yds	Avg	TD	PD	FR	Yds	TD	FF
1999	Northwestern	11	**2**	**40**	**20.0**	**1**	0	0	0	0	0
2000	Northwestern	**12**	1	19	19.0	0	0	0	**50**	**1**	0
2001	Northwestern	11	0	0	0	0	0	**1**	45	0	0
Career		34	3	59	19.7	1	0	1	95	1	0

== Personal life ==
Bentley earned his MBA from Rice University in 2015, and is currently a Cert-III level snowboard coach with Team Summit Colorado. He is currently on the MGA TOUR with the ATLMGA chapter. His alias is "Smart Stick" or #KBCLOSE
