= Jeremy Ebert =

American football player (born 1989)

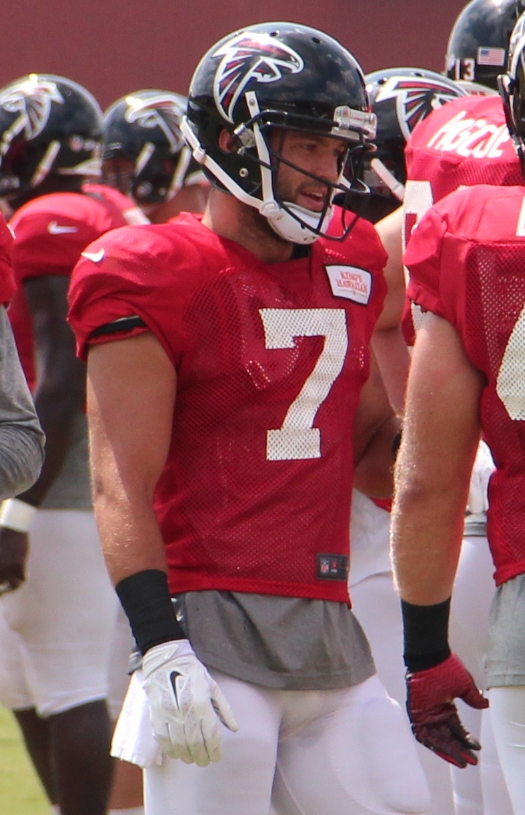
- Ebert with the Atlanta Falcons in 2014

No. 80
- Position: Wide receiver

Personal information
- Born: April 6, 1989 (age 37); Willard, Ohio, U.S.
- Listed height: 6 ft 0 in (1.83 m)
- Listed weight: 195 lb (88 kg)

Career information
- High school: Darby (Hilliard)
- College: Northwestern
- NFL draft: 2012: 7th round, 235th overall pick

Career history
- New England Patriots (2012)*; Philadelphia Eagles (2012)*; New England Patriots (2012–2013)*; Jacksonville Jaguars (2013); Atlanta Falcons (2014)*
- * Offseason or practice squad member only

Awards and highlights
- First-team All-Big Ten (2010); Second-team All-Big Ten (2011)

Career NFL statistics
- Receptions: 3
- Receiving yards: 18
- Stats at Pro Football Reference

Jeremy Ebert (born April 6, 1989) is an American former professional football player who was a wide receiver in the National Football League (NFL). He played college football for the Northwestern Wildcats and was selected by the New England Patriots in the seventh round of the 2012 NFL draft.

== Early life ==
Ebert was born in Willard, Ohio. Since then he has lived in Brooklyn, Ohio, Perrysburg, Ohio, and Hilliard, Ohio, where he attended Hilliard Darby High School.

== College career ==
During college, he played for Northwestern Wildcats as a wide-receiver and was an All-Big Ten selection his senior year.

== Professional career ==
=== New England Patriots (first stint) ===
The New England Patriots selected Ebert in the seventh round (235th overall) of the 2012 NFL draft. He was released on August 31 during the final cuts of the pre-season.

=== Philadelphia Eagles ===
Ebert was signed to the Philadelphia Eagles practice squad on September 13.

=== New England Patriots (second stint) ===
On November 27, Ebert tweeted that he was "heading back to where it all began" and was signed to the Patriots' practice squad the next day.

On April 29, 2013, it was announced that Ebert was released by the Patriots.

=== Jacksonville Jaguars ===
Ebert was signed by the Jacksonville Jaguars on May 22, 2013.

He was later released on August 30 and signed to the team's practice squad on September 1. He was promoted to the active roster on September 14. He registered his first career reception in Week 2 against the Oakland Raiders.

He was involved in numerous roster transactions over the season, and was signed to the active roster on November 23.

He was released on May 12, 2014.

=== Atlanta Falcons ===
Ebert signed with the Atlanta Falcons on July 22, 2014.
