= Randy Walker (American football coach) =

American football player (1954–2006)

- Walker in 2000

Biographical details
- Born: May 29, 1954; Troy, Ohio, U.S.
- Died: June 29, 2006 (aged 52); Evanston, Illinois, U.S.

Playing career
- 1973–1975: Miami (OH)
- Position: Fullback

Coaching career (HC unless noted)
- 1976–1977: Miami (OH) (RB)
- 1978–1981: North Carolina (RB)
- 1982–1985: North Carolina (QB)
- 1985–1987: North Carolina (OC/QB)
- 1988–1989: Northwestern (RB)
- 1990–1998: Miami (OH)
- 1999–2005: Northwestern

Head coaching record
- Overall: 96–81–5
- Bowls: 0–3

Accomplishments and honors

Championships
- 1 Big Ten (2000)

Awards
- Big Ten Coach of the Year (2000)

Randy J. Walker (May 29, 1954 – June 29, 2006) was an American college football player and coach. He served as the head football coach at Miami University from 1990 to 1998 and at Northwestern University from 1999 to 2005, compiling a career head coaching record of 96–81–5. Walker won 59 games at Miami, more than noted coaches who preceded him such as Sid Gillman, Woody Hayes, Bo Schembechler, Bill Mallory, and Ara Parseghian.

== Playing career ==
Walker had a standout season his last year in high school for the Troy Trojans in Troy, Ohio. He received recruiting offers from Big Ten schools like Northwestern University and Ohio State University, but chose instead to follow his high school sweetheart, Tammy, to Miami University (Tammy was a year older and already there).

He played three seasons at fullback for the Miami Redskins in Oxford under head coaches Bill Mallory and Dick Crum. His teammates included former Illinois coach Ron Zook and NFL standouts Rob Carpenter and Sherman Smith.

In his three years the team went 32–1–1 and was ranked #15 in 1973, #10 in 1974 and #12 in 1975. Miami won the Mid-American Conference in all three years. Miami also went to the Tangerine Bowl (presently the Capital One Bowl) where they beat Florida in 1973, Georgia in 1974 and South Carolina in 1975. In his senior year Walker was named the team's most valuable player. For his career he ran for 1757 yards.

He was drafted by the Cincinnati Bengals (1976; 13th round), but chose to become an assistant coach instead.

== Coaching career ==
Walker was an assistant coach for the Miami Redskins (1976–1977; running backs), then the University of North Carolina Tar Heels (running backs coach 1978–1981; quarterbacks coach 1982–1985; offensive coordinator and quarterbacks coach 1985–1987), and finally the Northwestern Wildcats (1988–1989; running backs).

=== Miami ===
Walker became Miami's 30th head coach, succeeding Tim Rose whose contract was not renewed. In his first year the Redhawks posted a 5–5–1 record, which was a vast improvement for a team that had only won two games in the two previous years. Walker made steady improvement in his nine years, culminating with a 10–1 record in his last year with the RedHawks. This team was led by record-breaking running back Travis Prentice. Walker finished with 59–35–5 record including several victories over ranked opponents from major conference such as #25 Northwestern in 1995, #12 Virginia Tech in 1997 and #12 North Carolina in 1998. However, he never won the Mid-American Conference Championship.

=== Northwestern ===
Walker had a 37–46 career record at Northwestern. In 2000, Walker overhauled the offense and introduced the spread formation. Unlike most other spread offenses, Walker's featured a very strong running game. His run game was so strong, in fact, that only one season in Walker's entire time at Northwestern did he fail to coach a 1000-yard rusher. This offense helped the Wildcats share the Big Ten title in his second year. He is third behind Pappy Waldorf in career victories. Walker also was the first Wildcat coach to lead three different teams to bowl games. In addition, he became the first Wildcat coach ever to guide three straight teams to four or more Big Ten wins.

== Death ==
On June 29, 2006, Walker, who was only 52, died suddenly of an apparent heart attack, leaving the Northwestern community shocked and saddened. He had battled a viral heart infection in the fall of 2004. On July 7, 2006 Pat Fitzgerald was named to replace him as head coach of the Wildcats.

== Personal life ==
Born to Jim Walker, an accountant with Hobart Corporation, and Ruth Ann Walker, he grew up in Troy, Ohio and graduated from Troy High School, where he played fullback and defensive back on the 1971 team that was picked by the Dayton Daily News as the area's best team over the past 50 years. As a student, he sang the lead in school musicals (including Tevye in Fiddler on the Roof), played the violin, and was active in student government. He graduated from Miami University in 1976 with a B.A. in social studies education and, in 1981, earned his master's degree in education administration.

He is survived by his wife and high-school sweetheart, Tammy (aka "Tamara"; née Weikert), and two children, daughter Abbey and son Jamie.

He met Tammy when he was on student council his junior year in high school. They were both put on a committee to plan a Thanksgiving dance in 1970. She was a senior and after she chose to attend Miami University he followed her there. They were married in 1975.

In an interview in 2000, Walker told Skip Myslenski of the Chicago Tribune that the defining moment in his life came in 1969. On a high school team that was rebuilding and led by undersized sophomores like himself, they were having a terrible season (they went 2–7–1). On the last play of the last game of the season, with the game tied 22–22 against powerful rival Dayton Wayne, the pass went to the 165-pound Walker. He was tackled 18 inches from the end zone. After the game his coach, James "Jim" Conard, made the entire team walk around with a piece of cloth that was 18 inches long, until the start of the 1970 season.

Walker gave up his first love, baseball, joined the track team for speed and stamina, and started lifting weights, gaining 30 pounds. Reporting to fall practice at 195 pounds, Walker's teams would not lose another game the remaining two seasons, going 20–0.

== Head coaching record ==
Year	Team	Overall	Conference	Standing	Bowl/playoffs
Miami Redskins / RedHawks (Mid-American Conference) (1990–1998)
1990	Miami	5–5–1	4–3–1	5th	
1991	Miami	6–4–1	4–3–1	T–3rd	
1992	Miami	6–4–1	5–3	T–3rd	
1993	Miami	4–7	3–6	9th	
1994	Miami	6–4–1	5–3	3rd	
1995	Miami	8–2–1	6–1–1	2nd	
1996	Miami	6–5	6–2	T–2nd	
1997	Miami	8–3	6–2	T–2nd (East)	
1998	Miami	10–1	7–1	T–1st (East)	
Miami:		59–36–5	46–24–3		
Northwestern Wildcats (Big Ten Conference) (1999–2005)
1999	Northwestern	3–8	1–7	10th	
2000	Northwestern	8–4	6–2	T–1st	L Alamo
2001	Northwestern	4–7	2–6	T–10th	
2002	Northwestern	3–9	1–7	T–10th	
2003	Northwestern	6–7	4–4	T–7th	L Motor City
2004	Northwestern	6–6	5–3	4th	
2005	Northwestern	7–5	5–3	T–3rd	L Sun
Northwestern:		37–46	24–32		
Total:		96–81–5			
National championship Conference title Conference division title or championship game berth
