= Len Williams (Canadian football) =

Canadian Football League quarterback (born 1971)

Profile
- Position: Quarterback

Personal information
- Born: October 29, 1971 (age 55); Rockford, Illinois, U.S.
- Listed height: 6 ft 0 in (1.83 m)
- Listed weight: 220 lb (100 kg)

Career information
- High school: Guilford (IL)
- College: Northwestern

Career history
- 1994: Las Vegas Posse
- 1995: Calgary Stampeders

Len Williams (born October 29, 1971) is a former Canadian Football League quarterback.

After playing his college football at Northwestern University, Williams played 17 games with the Las Vegas Posse in 1994, completing 80 of 138 passes for 1222 yards, 10 touchdowns and 8 interceptions. He also rushed for 86 yards and one touchdown. He played one season for the Calgary Stampeders.
