= Sam Simmons (American football) =

American football player (born 1979)

No. 83, 7, 10
- Positions: Wide receiver, return specialist

Personal information
- Born: November 25, 1979 (age 46); Kansas City, Missouri, U.S.

Career information
- High school: Schlagle (Kansas City, Kansas)
- College: Northwestern
- NFL draft: 2002: 5th round, 170th overall pick

Career history
- Miami Dolphins (2002–2003); Pittsburgh Steelers (2005)*; Frankfurt Galaxy (2005); Kansas City Brigade (2006–2007)
- * Offseason or practice squad member only

Career NFL statistics
- Receptions: 39
- Receiving yards: 418
- Touchdowns: 4
- Stats at Pro Football Reference
- Stats at ArenaFan.com

Samuel Leeland Simmons (born November 25, 1979) is an American former professional football player who was a wide receiver in the National Football League (NFL) and Arena Football League (AFL). He was selected by the Miami Dolphins in the fifth round of the 2002 NFL draft. He played college football for the Northwestern Wildcats.

Simmons was also a member of the Pittsburgh Steelers and Kansas City Brigade.
