= Tim McGarigle =

American football player and coach (born 1983)

Northwestern Wildcats
- Title: Defensive coordinator

Personal information
- Born: October 25, 1983 (age 43); Chicago, Illinois, U.S.
- Listed height: 6 ft 0 in (1.83 m)
- Listed weight: 240 lb (109 kg)

Career information
- High school: St. Patrick (Chicago)
- College: Northwestern
- NFL draft: 2006: 7th round, 221st overall pick

Career history

Playing
- St. Louis Rams (2006–2007); Florida Tuskers (2009–2010)

Coaching
- Northwestern (2011) Graduate assistant; Western Michigan (2012–2013) Linebackers coach; Western Michigan (2014–2015) Linebackers coach & run game coordinator; Illinois (2016) Linebackers coach; Green Bay Packers (2017) Defensive quality control coach; Northwestern (2018–2023) Linebackers coach; Northwestern (2024–present) Defensive coordinator & linebackers coach

Awards and highlights
- First-team All-Big Ten (2004); Second-team All-Big Ten (2005)

Career NFL statistics
- Total tackles: 6
- Stats at Pro Football Reference

Timothy J. McGarigle (born October 25, 1983) is an American former professional football player who was a linebacker in the National Football League (NFL). He was selected by the St. Louis Rams in the seventh round of the 2006 NFL draft. He also played for the Florida Tuskers of the United Football League (UFL). Currently, he is an assistant coach for the Northwestern Wildcats, with whom he also played college football.

== Early life ==
McGarigle played for Saint Tarcissus on the northwest side of Chicago throughout his grammar school career. He graduated from St. Patrick High School in Chicago. At St. Patrick he played linebacker, as well as running back.

== College career ==
McGarigle played college football at Northwestern University, setting a then Football Bowl Subdivision record for most career tackles with 545. He graduated with a degree in communications studies.

== Professional career ==
Pre-draft measurables
| Height | Weight | Arm length | Hand span | 40-yard dash | 10-yard split | 20-yard split | 20-yard shuttle | Three-cone drill | Vertical jump | Broad jump | Wonderlic |
|---|---|---|---|---|---|---|---|---|---|---|---|
| 6 ft 0 5/8 in (1.84 m) | 242 lb (110 kg) | 29 1/4 in (0.74 m) | 9 1/4 in (0.23 m) | 4.74 s | 1.63 s | 2.77 s | 4.07 s | 7.09 s | 38 in (0.97 m) | 9 ft 10 in (3.00 m) | 30 |
All values from NFL Combine

=== St. Louis Rams ===
McGarigle was selected by the St. Louis Rams in the seventh round (221st overall) in the 2006 NFL draft. He spent the 2006 season as a member of the practice squad. In 2007, McGarigle made the active roster and played 12 games. He was released from the Rams on September 3, 2008, and spent the rest of the year out of football.

=== Florida Tuskers ===
McGarigle was drafted by the Florida Tuskers of the United Football League in the UFL Premiere Season Draft in 2009. He signed with the team on August 17. In 2009, the Tuskers finished an undefeated regular season only to lose to the Las Vegas Locomotives in the 2009 UFL Championship Game. McGarigle was one of the team's defensive leaders, and recorded 34 1/2 tackles, one sack, one interception, and a forced fumble. In March 2010, McGarigle was one of 20 players from the 2009 team chosen by Tuskers head coach Jay Gruden, as the team began to build its 2010 roster.

== Coaching career ==
McGarigle joined the Northwestern coaching staff as a defensive graduate assistant in 2011, and then went on to coach linebackers at Western Michigan University. Following the 2015 season, he was hired to coach linebackers at the University of Illinois. He subsequently served as a defensive quality control coach for the Green Bay Packers. On January 4, 2018, it was announced that McGarigle would return to Northwestern as an assistant coach on Pat Fitzgerald's staff.
