= Richard Buchanan (American football) =

American football player (born 1969)

No. 89
- Position: Wide receiver

Personal information
- Born: May 8, 1969 (age 57); Chicago, Illinois, U.S.

Career information
- College: Northwestern
- NFL draft: 1991: undrafted
- Expansion draft: 1995: 21st round, 42nd overall pick

Career history
- Miami Dolphins (1991)*; Frankfurt Galaxy (1992); Los Angeles Rams (1993–1994)
- * Offseason or practice squad member only

Awards and highlights
- Third-team All-American (1989); First-team All-Big Ten (1990)
- Stats at Pro Football Reference

Richard Lawrence Buchanan Jr. (born May 8, 1969) is an American former professional football player who was a wide receiver in the National Football League (NFL) and the World League of American Football (WLAF). He played college football for the Northwestern Wildcats. Buchanan played for the Los Angeles Rams of the NFL, and the Frankfurt Galaxy of the WLAF.
