= Brett Basanez =

American football player (born 1983)

No. 14
- Position: Quarterback

Personal information
- Born: May 11, 1983 (age 43); Long Beach, California, U.S.
- Listed height: 6 ft 2 in (1.88 m)
- Listed weight: 208 lb (94 kg)

Career information
- High school: St. Viator (Arlington Heights, Illinois)
- College: Northwestern (2002–2005)
- NFL draft: 2006: undrafted

Career history
- Carolina Panthers (2006–2008); Chicago Bears (2009–2010)

Awards and highlights
- Big Ten Co-Offensive Player of the Year (2005); First-team All-Big Ten (2005)

Career NFL statistics
- Passing attempts: 11
- Passing completions: 6
- Completion percentage: 54.5%
- TD–INT: 0–1
- Passing yards: 56
- Passer rating: 30.9
- Stats at Pro Football Reference

Brett Stephen Basanez (born May 11, 1983) is an American former professional football player who was a quarterback in the National Football League (NFL). He played college football for the Northwestern Wildcats and was signed by the Carolina Panthers as an undrafted free agent after the 2006 NFL draft. Basanez was also a member of the Chicago Bears.

== Early life ==
Basanez played high school football at St. Viator in Arlington Heights. He participated in the first ever U.S. Army All-American Bowl game in 2000.

== College career ==
Basanez played college football at Northwestern University in Evanston, Illinois, where he holds many school records for passing categories, including passing yards (10,580) and total offense (11,576). Basanez ranks 13th on the NCAA's all-time list for total offense, and 28th on the all-time list for passing yards. He was close to becoming the only player in NCAA history with 10,000 passing yards and 1,000 rushing yards (Basanez picked up 996 yards on the ground while at NU). He set two Sun Bowl records in the 2005 Sun Bowl: 38 completions and total offense of 448 yards. His 50 attempts in the game are tied for second, with Kyle Orton and Byron Leftwich in all-time bowls, trailing only Mike Kafka, another Northwestern Wildcat QB.

=== School records ===
Career

- Total Offense (11,576)
- Passing Attempts (1,584)
- Passing Completions (913)
- Passing Yards (10,580)
- Passing Touchdowns (44) (ties record)
- Wins (22)
- Games Passing for 200 Yards (26)
- Games Passing for 300 Yards (10)
- Games Passing for 400 Yards (3)
- Consecutive Games Passing for 200 Yards (10)
- Consecutive Games Passing for 300 Yards (5)

Single season

- Total Offense (4,045) 2005
- Passing Attempts (497) 2005
- Passing Completions (314) 2005
- Passing Yards (3,622) 2005
- Passing Touchdowns (21)
- Passing Yards Gained in Two Consecutive Games (824) 2005
- Passing Yards Gained in Three Consecutive Games (1,155) 2005
- Passing Yards Gained in Four Consecutive Games (1,481) 2005
- Passing Yards Gained in Five Consecutive Games (1,819) 2005
- Games Passing for 200 Yards (11) 2005
- Games Passing for 300 Yards (7) 2005
- Consecutive Games Passing for 200 Yards (9) 2005
- Consecutive Games Passing for 300 Yards (5) 2005
- Passing Efficiency Rating (135.1) 2005
- Passing Completion Percentage (.632) 2005

Single game

- Total Offense (548) vs. TCU, 2004
- Passing TD's in a Half (3) vs. TCU, 2004 (ties record)
- Passing Completion Percentage (.806, 25-of-31) vs. Illinois, 2005

=== Statistics ===
Year	Team	Passing								Rushing			
Year	Team	Cmp	Att	Pct	Yds	Y/A	TD	Int	Rtg	Att	Yds	Avg	TD
2002	Northwestern	190	325	58.5	2,204	6.8	7	7	118.2	67	96	1.4	4
2003	Northwestern	162	302	53.6	1,916	6.3	4	12	103.4	128	219	1.7	2
2004	Northwestern	247	460	53.7	2,838	6.2	12	9	110.2	83	258	3.1	5
2005	Northwestern	314	497	63.2	3,622	7.3	21	8	135.1	113	423	3.7	7
Career		913	1,584	57.6	10,580	6.7	44	36	118.4	391	996	2.5	18

== Professional career ==
=== Carolina Panthers ===
Basanez was signed by the Carolina Panthers as an undrafted free agent following the 2006 NFL draft on May 1, 2006. He was waived on September 2 and re-signed to the practice squad on September 3. He was promoted to the active roster on December 10.

Basanez suffered a hand injury prior to the start of the 2007 season and was placed on injured reserve on August 28, 2007, ending his season.

He was released on August 30, 2008, during final roster cuts and re-signed to the practice squad on September 3.

=== Chicago Bears ===
Basanez was signed by the Chicago Bears in February 2009 to a two-year contract. He was waived on September 5 and re-signed to the practice squad on September 6. He was promoted to the active roster on December 30. He was waived/injured on May 19, 2010, and reverted to injured reserve. He was released from injured reserve with an injury settlement on September 12, 2010.

=== Statistics ===
Year	Team	GP	GS	Passing								Rushing			
Year	Team	GP	GS	Cmp	Att	Pct	Yds	Y/A	TD	Int	Rtg	Att	Yds	Avg	TD
2006	CAR	1	0	6	11	54.5	56	5.1	0	1	30.9	1	2	2.0	0
