= Austin King =

American football player and coach (born 1981)

Denver Broncos
- Title: Tight ends coach

Personal information
- Born: April 11, 1981 (age 45); Cincinnati, Ohio, U.S.
- Listed height: 6 ft 3 in (1.91 m)
- Listed weight: 288 lb (131 kg)

Career information
- Position: Center (No. 66)
- High school: Purcell Marian (Cincinnati)
- College: Northwestern
- NFL draft: 2003: 4th round, 133rd overall pick

Career history

Playing
- Tampa Bay Buccaneers (2003); Atlanta Falcons (2004–2006); Seattle Seahawks (2007)*
- * Offseason or practice squad member only

Coaching
- Toledo (2012–2013) Offensive quality control assistant; Syracuse (2014) Offensive quality control assistant; Dayton (2015–2019) Offensive coordinator; Las Vegas Raiders (2020–2021); Offensive quality control coach (2020); Tight ends coach (2021); Chicago Bears (2022) Assistant offensive line coach; Denver Broncos (2023–present); Assistant offensive line coach (2023–2024); Tight ends coach (2025–present)

Career NFL statistics
- Games played: 34
- Games started: 1
- Stats at Pro Football Reference

Austin Patrick King (born April 11, 1981) is an American professional football coach and former center who is the tight ends coach for the Denver Broncos of the National Football League (NFL).

== Playing career ==
Pre-draft measurables
| Height | Weight | Arm length | Hand span | 40-yard dash | 10-yard split | 20-yard split | 20-yard shuttle | Three-cone drill | Vertical jump | Broad jump | Bench press |
|---|---|---|---|---|---|---|---|---|---|---|---|
| 6 ft 3 7/8 in (1.93 m) | 299 lb (136 kg) | 31 in (0.79 m) | 9 5/8 in (0.24 m) | 5.57 s | 1.81 s | 3.12 s | 4.73 s | 7.99 s | 28 in (0.71 m) | 8 ft 10 in (2.69 m) | 20 reps |
All values from NFL Combine

The Tampa Bay Buccaneers selected him the fourth round of the 2003 NFL draft. Following his rookie season, he played the majority of his career with the Atlanta Falcons.

== Coaching career ==
After beginning at Toledo as a quality control coach and working his way up to offensive coordinator at Dayton where he led a record setting offense in 2019, he was hired as a quality control coach by the Raiders on February 5, 2020. In February 2021, he was promoted to tight ends coach. He was not retained by new Raiders head coach Josh McDaniels and was hired to be the assistant offensive line coach under new Chicago Bears head coach Matt Eberflus on February 7, 2022.

On February 28, 2023, King was hired by the Denver Broncos to serve as the team's assistant offensive line coach.

On March 6, 2025, King was promoted to the position of tight ends coach after the departure of Declan Doyle.
