= Tom Homco =

American football player (born 1970)

Thomas Homco
No. 57
- Position: Linebacker

Personal information
- Born: January 8, 1970 (age 56); Hammond, Indiana, U.S.
- Listed height: 6 ft 1 in (1.85 m)
- Listed weight: 245 lb (111 kg)

Career information
- College: Northwestern
- NFL draft: 1992: undrafted

Career history
- Los Angeles/St. Louis Rams (1992–1996)
- Stats at Pro Football Reference

Thomas Ross Homco (born January 8, 1970) is an American former professional football player who was a linebacker in the National Football League (NFL). He played for four seasons with the Los Angeles/St. Louis Rams. He played college football for the Northwestern Wildcats. Prior to that, he led Highland High School to its only Indiana State Championship game in 1987, which was a 14–7 loss to Indianapolis Ben Davis.
