= Greg Colby =

American football player and coach (born 1952)

Biographical details
- Born: February 25, 1952 (age 74)

Playing career

Football
- 1971–1973: Illinois

Baseball
- 1972–1974: Illinois
- Position: Linebacker (football)

Coaching career (HC unless noted)

Football
- 1974: Illinois (GA)
- c. 1975: Marshall HS (IL) (assistant)
- 1979–1981: Schlarman Academy (IL)
- 1982–1986: Naperville Central HS (IL)
- 1987: Michigan State (GA)
- 1988–1994: Illinois (assistant)
- 1995–1997: Michigan State (assistant)
- 1998–2001: Kent State (DC)
- 2002–2007: Northwestern (DC)
- 2008–2012: Millersville
- 2013–2014: Illinois (DL)
- 2015–2018: Central Michigan (DC)
- 2019: Buffalo (defensive analyst)

Baseball
- 1978–1980: Illinois (assistant)

Head coaching record
- Overall: 11–44 (college)

Greg Colby (born February 25, 1952) is an American football coach. He was the defensive coordinator at Central Michigan University from 2015 to 2018. Colby served as the head football coach at Millersville University of Pennsylvania from 2008 to 2012, compiling a record of 11–44. He was the defensive coordinator at Kent State University from 1998 to 2001 and at Northwestern University from 2002 to 2007.

== Head coaching record ==
=== College ===
Year	Team	Overall	Conference	Standing	Bowl/playoffs
Millersville Marauders (Pennsylvania State Athletic Conference) (2008–2012)
2008	Millersville	1–10	1–6	7th (Eastern)	
2009	Millersville	3–8	2–5	7th (Eastern)	
2010	Millersville	2–9	0–7	8th (Eastern)	
2011	Millersville	3–8	2–5	6th (Eastern)	
2012	Millersville	2–9	1–6	7th (Eastern)	
Millersville:		11–44	6–29		
Total:		11–44			
