= Damien Anderson =

American gridiron football player (born 1979)

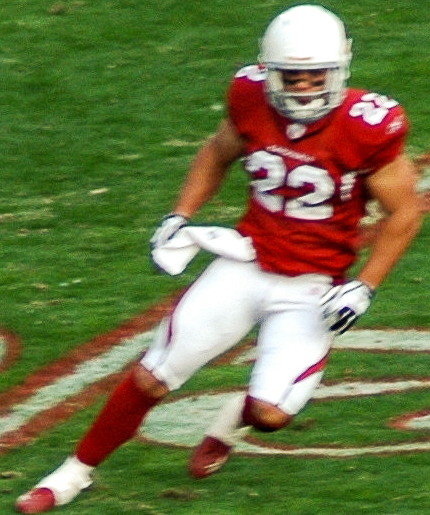
- Anderson with the Arizona Cardinals in 2005

No. 20, 22, 32
- Position: Running back

Personal information
- Born: July 17, 1979 (age 47); Chicago, Illinois, U.S.
- Listed height: 5 ft 11 in (1.80 m)
- Listed weight: 218 lb (99 kg)

Career information
- High school: Wilmington (Wilmington, Illinois)
- College: Northwestern
- NFL draft: 2002: undrafted

Career history
- Arizona Cardinals (2002–2005); Edmonton Eskimos (2007–2008)

Awards and highlights
- Consensus All-American (2000); First-team All-Big Ten (2000); Second-team All-Big Ten (1999)

Career NFL statistics
- Rushing attempts: 45
- Rushing yards: 142
- Receptions: 9
- Receiving yards: 72
- Stats at Pro Football Reference

Damien Ramone Anderson (born July 17, 1979) is an American former professional football player who was a running back in the National Football League (NFL) and Canadian Football League (CFL). He played college football for the Northwestern Wildcats, earning consensus All-American honors. He signed as an undrafted free agent with the NFL's Arizona Cardinals, and later played for the CFL's Edmonton Eskimos.

== Early life ==
Anderson was born in Chicago, Illinois. He graduated from Wilmington High School in Wilmington, Illinois, where he played high school football for the Wilmington Wildcats.

== College career ==
Anderson attended Northwestern University, and was a standout for the Northwestern Wildcats football team from 1997 to 2000. As a senior in 2000, Anderson capped a record-setting season by becoming just the fourth player in Big Ten Conference history to run for 2,000 or more yards in a single season. He closed his four-year career with 4,485 rushing yards (the eighth-best figure in Big Ten history), 38 rushing touchdowns and 5,261 all-purpose yards—all school records. His single-season rushing average was the 20th best in NCAA history (an average of 174.0 yards per game for 11 regular-season games). Anderson also rushed for 1,549 yards in eight Big Ten games in 2000, which remains a conference single-season record. His running exploits helped the Wildcats capture a share of the 2000 Big Ten title, their third conference crown in a six-year period.

Anderson finished fifth in the Heisman Trophy voting and was tabbed as a finalist for the Doak Walker Award (nation's top running back). He received first-team All-Big Ten honors, and was recognized as a consensus first-team All-American, after receiving first-team All-America honors from the Football Writers Association of America, the Walter Camp Foundation, Football News, CNN/SI.com and Sporting News.

In addition to his Wildcats career records for rushing, all-purpose yardage, rushing touchdowns, and 200-yard rushing games (4), Anderson still holds five team single-season marks, all set in 2000: rushing yards (2,063), yards per game (171.9), all-purpose yards (2,195), rushing touchdowns (23) and points (138). He also scored at least one touchdown in 11 consecutive games, a Northwestern record. Anderson, who played in 43 career games, started 32 consecutive games during his career and 40 times overall.

== Professional career ==
Anderson played four years with the NFL's Arizona Cardinals as well as two years with the CFL's Edmonton Eskimos.

In 2004 he made an amazing recovery from injuries sustained in a car accident. Anderson spent 14 days in an intensive care unit and nearly three weeks in the hospital after undergoing surgery to remove his spleen and repair a fractured eye socket. He also suffered liver damage, broken ribs, and a collapsed lung in the rollover accident. Anderson was fully recovered in time for the Cardinals' June minicamp.

== Personal life ==
Anderson is married to Elizabeth Anderson with whom he has son: Drake is a running back for the University of Arizona, after starting his college career at Northwestern.
