= Eddie Sutter =

American football player (born 1969)

No. 54, 50
- Position: Linebacker

Personal information
- Born: October 3, 1969 (age 57); Peoria, Illinois, U.S.
- Listed height: 6 ft 3 in (1.91 m)
- Listed weight: 240 lb (109 kg)

Career information
- High school: Richwoods (IL)
- College: Northwestern
- NFL draft: 1992: undrafted

Career history
- Minnesota Vikings (1992)*; Cleveland Browns (1992)*; New England Patriots (1993)*; Cleveland Browns (1993–1995); Baltimore Ravens (1996); Cincinnati Bengals (1997)*; Miami Dolphins (1997)*; Atlanta Falcons (1997)
- * Offseason or practice squad member only

Awards and highlights
- Second-team All-Big Ten (1990); Big Ten Co-Freshman of the Year (1988)

Career NFL statistics
- Tackles: 38
- Fumble recoveries: 1
- Stats at Pro Football Reference

Eddie Sutter (born October 3, 1969) is an American former professional football player who was a linebacker for five seasons in the National Football League (NFL) with the Cleveland Browns, Baltimore Ravens, and Atlanta Falcons. He played college football for the Northwestern Wildcats.
