= Lee Gissendaner =

American football executive (born 1971)

Green Bay Packers
- Title: Player personnel executive / Director of pro scouting

Personal information
- Born: October 25, 1971 (age 55); Akron, Ohio, U.S.

Career information
- High school: Stow (OH)
- College: Northwestern
- NFL draft: 1994: 6th round, 187th overall pick

Career history

Playing
- Houston Oilers (1994)*; Toronto Argonauts (1995); Scottish Claymores (1996); Minnesota Vikings (1996)*
- * Offseason or practice squad member only

Coaching
- Kent State (1997) Graduate assistant

Operations
- Green Bay Packers (1998–2000) National scouting service representative; Green Bay Packers (2001–2014) Area scout; New York Jets (2015–2017) Area scout; Green Bay Packers (2018–present); Player personnel executive (2018–present); Director of pro scouting (2026–present)

Awards and highlights
- Big Ten Most Valuable Player (1992); First-team All-Big Ten (1992)

Lee Gissendaner (born October 25, 1971) is the director of pro scouting and player personnel executive for the Green Bay Packers of the National Football League (NFL). He is a former American and Canadian football wide receiver in the Canadian Football League (CFL) and World League of American Football (WLAF). He was selected by the Houston Oilers in the sixth round of the 1994 NFL draft, but did not appear in an NFL games. He also played for the Toronto Argonauts of the CFL and the Scottish Claymores of the WLAF. Gissendaner played college football at Northwestern, winning the Big Ten Most Valuable Player in 1992.

== Coaching career ==
Gissendaner served as a scout with the Green Bay Packers for 17 years (1998–2014), before joining the New York Jets with the same position from 2015 to 2017.

On May 19, 2026, having returned to Green Bay in 2018, Gissendaner added the title of director of pro scouting to his title.
