= List of Northwestern Wildcats head football coaches =

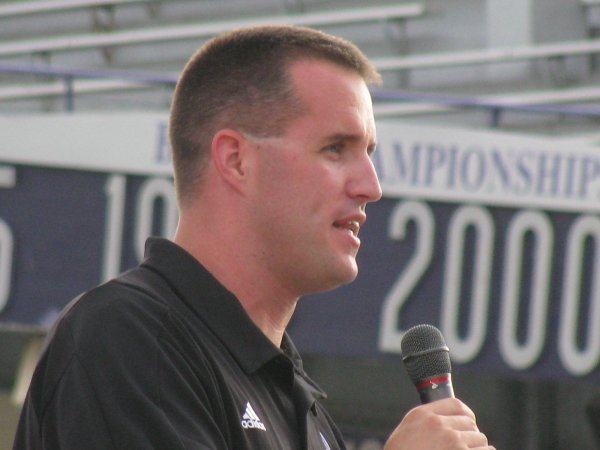
Pat Fitzgerald served as head coach at Northwestern from 2006 to 2022.

The Northwestern Wildcats college football team represents the Northwestern University in the Big Ten Conference. The Wildcats compete as part of the NCAA Division I Football Bowl Subdivision. The program has had 30 head coaches since it began play during the 1876 season. Since July 2023, David Braun has served as head coach at Northwestern.

Five coaches have led Northwestern in postseason bowl games: Bob Voigts, Gary Barnett, Randy Walker, Pat Fitzgerald, and Braun. Six of those coaches also won conference championships: Walter McCornack captured one as a member of the Western Conference; and Dick Hanley and Barnett each captured two and Pappy Waldorf, Glenn Thistlethwaite, and Walker each captured one as a member of the Big Ten Conference.

Fitzgerald is the leader in overall wins and seasons coached with 110 wins during his 17 years as head coach. Walter McCornack has the highest winning percentage at 0.800. Rick Venturi has the lowest winning percentage at 0.045. Of the 30 different head coaches who have led the Wildcats, Charlie Bachman, Waldorf, Alex Agase, and Ara Parseghian have been inducted into the College Football Hall of Fame.

== Key ==
Key to symbols in coaches list
General		Overall		Conference		Postseason (Note: Although the first Rose Bowl Game was played in 1902, it has been continuously played since the 1916 game, and is recognized as the oldest bowl game by the NCAA. "—" indicates any season prior to 1916 when postseason games were not played.)	
No.	Order of coaches (Note: A running total of the number of head coaches, with coaches who served separate tenures being counted only once. Interim head coaches are represented with "Int" and are not counted in the running total. "—" indicates the team played but either without a coach or no coach is on record. "X" indicates an interim year without play.)	GC	Games coached	CW	Conference wins	PW	Postseason wins
DC	Division championships	OW	Overall wins	CL	Conference losses	PL	Postseason losses
CC	Conference championships	OL	Overall losses	CT	Conference ties	PT	Postseason ties
NC	National championships	OT	Overall ties (Note: Overtime rules in college football were introduced in 1996, making ties impossible in the period since.)	C%	Conference winning percentage		
†	Elected to the College Football Hall of Fame	O%	Overall winning percentage (Note: When computing the win–loss percentage, a tie counts as half a win and half a loss.)				

== Coaches ==
List of head football coaches showing season(s) coached, overall records, conference records, postseason records, championships and selected awards (Note: Statistics correct as of the end of the 2025 NCAA Division I FBS football season.)
No.	Name (Note: Northwestern did not have a head coach for the 1876, 1882, 1886, 1882, and 1888–1890.)	Season(s) (Note: Northwestern did not field a team for the 1877–1881, 1883–1885, 1887, and 1906–1907 seasons.)	GC	OW	OL	OT	O%	CW	CL	CT	C%	PW	PL	PT	CC	NC	Awards
1	Knowlton Ames	1891–1892	17	7	5	5	0.559	1	3	0	0.250	—	—	—	0	—	—
2	Paul Noyes	1893	10	2	5	3	0.350	0	2	0	.000	—	—	—	0	—	—
3	A. A. Ewing	1894	9	4	5	0	0.444	—	—	—	—	—	—	—	—	—	—
4	Alvin H. Culver	1895–1896	20	12	6	2	0.650	2	1	1	0.625	—	—	—	0	—	—
5	Jesse Van Doozer	1897	8	5	3	0	0.625	0	2	0	.000	—	—	—	0	—	—
6	W. H. Bannard	1898	14	9	4	1	0.679	0	4	0	.000	—	—	—	0	—	—
7	Charles M. Hollister	1899–1902	47	27	16	4	0.617	7	9	2	0.444	—	—	—	0	—	—
8	Walter McCornack	1903–1905	35	26	5	4	0.800	2	4	2	0.375	—	—	—	1	—	—
9	Alton Johnson	1908	4	2	2	0	0.500	0	2	0	.000	—	—	—	0	—	—
10	Bill Horr	1909	5	1	3	1	0.300	1	3	0	0.250	—	—	—	0	—	—
11	Charles Hammett	1910–1912	18	6	10	2	0.389	0	6	0	.000	—	—	—	0	—	—
12	Dennis Grady	1913	7	1	6	0	0.143	0	6	0	.000	—	—	—	0	—	—
13	Fred J. Murphy	1914–1918	33	16	16	1	0.500	8	15	0	0.348	—	—	—	0	—	—
14	Charlie Bachman^{†}	1919	7	2	5	0	0.286	1	4	0	0.200	—	—	—	0	—	—
15	Elmer McDevitt	1920–1921	14	4	10	0	0.286	2	8	0	0.200	—	—	—	0	—	—
16	Glenn Thistlethwaite	1922–1926	39	21	17	1	0.551	10	13	1	0.438	—	—	—	1	—	—
17	Dick Hanley	1927–1934	66	36	26	4	0.576	22	19	2	0.535	—	—	—	2	—	—
18	Pappy Waldorf^{†}	1935–1946	101	49	45	7	0.520	34	31	7	0.521	—	—	—	1	—	—
19	Bob Voigts	1947–1954	73	33	39	1	0.459	18	32	0	0.360	1	0	0	0	—	—
20	Lou Saban	1955	9	0	8	1	0.056	0	6	1	0.071	0	0	0	0	—	—
21	Ara Parseghian^{†}	1956–1963	72	36	35	1	0.507	22	31	1	0.417	0	0	0	0	—	—
22	Alex Agase^{†}	1964–1972	91	32	58	1	0.357	26	40	1	0.396	0	0	0	0	—	—
23	John Pont	1973–1977	55	12	43	0	0.218	10	31	0	0.244	0	0	0	0	—	—
24	Rick Venturi	1978–1980	33	1	31	1	0.045	0	26	1	0.019	0	0	0	0	—	—
25	Dennis Green	1981–1985	55	10	45	0	0.182	7	37	0	0.159	0	0	0	0	—	—
26	Francis Peay	1986–1991	66	13	51	2	0.212	9	38	1	0.198	0	0	0	0	—	—
27	Gary Barnett	1992–1998	81	35	45	1	0.438	23	33	0	0.411	0	2	0	2	—	—
28	Randy Walker	1999–2005	83	37	46	—	0.446	24	32	—	0.429	0	3	—	1	—	—
29	Pat Fitzgerald	2006–2022	211	110	101	—	0.521	65	76	—	0.461	5	5	—	0	—	Bobby Dodd COY (2020)
30	David Braun	2023–present	38	19	19	—	0.500	11	16	—	0.407	2	0	—	0	—	—
