= List of Northwestern Wildcats football seasons =

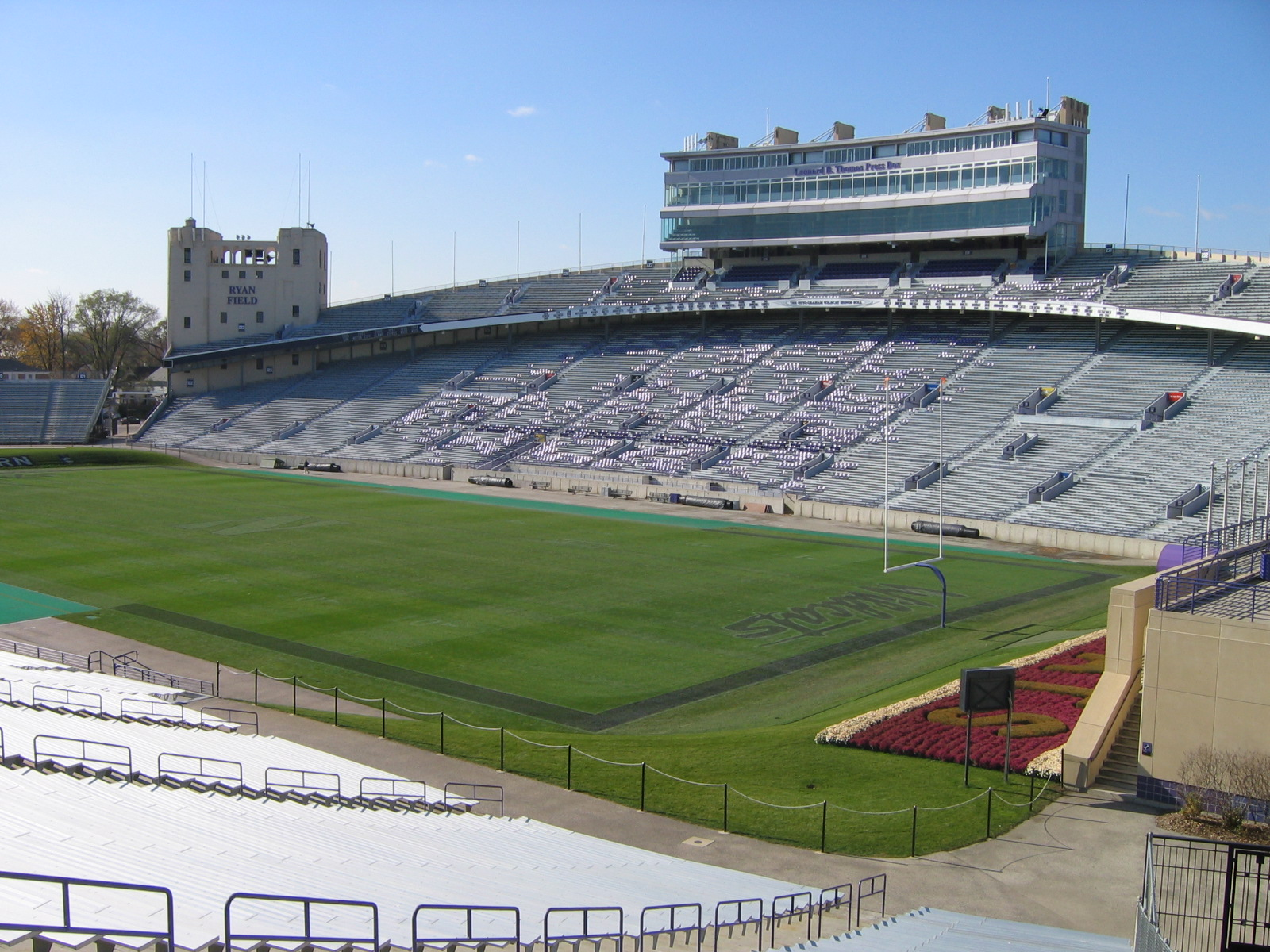
The Wildcats played at Ryan Field from 1926-2023.

This is a list of seasons completed by the Northwestern Wildcats football team of the National Collegiate Athletic Association (NCAA) Division I Football Bowl Subdivision (FBS). Since the team's creation in 1876, the Wildcats have participated in more than 1,100 officially sanctioned games, including 9 bowl games.

Northwestern originally competed as a football independent. As one of the founding members, Northwestern joined the Big Ten conference, then known as the Western Conference, in 1896, where it has been a member ever since.

The Wildcats have experienced futility for much of its existence. The team has several winless seasons, including setting an NCAA Division I record for consecutive losses when it lost 34 straight games from 1979 to 1982. The Wildcats went 64 years without winning a bowl game after the 1949 Rose Bowl. Northwestern has also experienced success, winning eight conference titles.

== Seasons ==
Year	Coach	Overall	Conference	Standing	Bowl/playoffs	Coaches^{#}	AP^{°}
Independent (1882–1890)
1882	No coach	1–1					
1883–85	No team						
1886	No coach	0–1					
1887	No team						
1888	No coach	2–1					
1889	No coach	2–2					
1890	No coach	4–1–1					
Knowlton Ames (Independent) (1891)
1891	Knowlton Ames	2–2–3					
Knowlton Ames (IAANW) (1892)
1892	Knowlton Ames	5–3–2	1–3	4th			
Paul Noyes (IAANW) (1893)
1893	Paul Noyes	2–5–3	0–2	4th			
A. A. Ewing (Independent) (1894)
1894	A. A. Ewing	4–5					
Alvin Culver (Independent) (1895)
1895	Alvin Culver	6–5					
Alvin Culver (Western Conference) (1896)
1896	Alvin Culver	6–1–2	2–1–1	3rd			
Jesse Van Doozer (Western Conference) (1897)
1897	Jesse Van Doozer	5–3	0–2	6th			
W. H. Bannard (Western Conference) (1898)
1898	W. H. Bannard	9–4–1	0–4	7th			
Charles Hollister (Western Conference) (1899–1902)
1899	Charles Hollister	7–6	2–2	3rd			
1900	Charles Hollister	7–2–3	2–1–2	5th			
1901	Charles Hollister	8–2–1	3–2	5th			
1902	Charles Hollister	6–6	0–4	T–8th			
Walter McCornack (Western Conference) (1903–1905)
1903	Walter McCornack	10–1–3	1–0–2	T–1st			
1904	Walter McCornack	8–2	1–2	T–5th			
1905	Walter McCornack	8–2–1	0—2	T–7th			
1906	No team						
1907	No team						
Alton Johnson (Western Conference) (1908)
1908	Alton Johnson	2–2	0–2	T–7th			
Bill Horr (Western Conference) (1908)
1909	Bill Horr	1–3–1	1–3	T–5th			
Charles Hammett (Western Conference) (1910–1912)
1910	Charles Hammett	1–3–1	1–2–1	T–6th			
1911	Charles Hammett	3–4	1–4	7th			
1912	Charles Hammett	2–3–1	2–3	5th			
Dennis Grady (Western Conference) (1913)
1913	Dennis Grady	1–6	0–6	9th			
Fred Murphy (Western Conference) (1914–1918)
1914	Fred Murphy	1–6	0–6	9th			
1915	Fred Murphy	2–5	0–5	9th			
1916	Fred Murphy	6–1	4–1	2nd			
1917	Fred Murphy	5–2	3–2	T–3rd			
1918	Fred Murphy	2–2–1	1–1	6th			
Charlie Bachman (Western Conference) (1919)
1919	Charlie Bachman	2–5	1–4	T–7th			
Elmer McDevitt (Western Conference) (1920–1921)
1920	Elmer McDevitt	3–4	2–3	7th			
1921	Elmer McDevitt	1–6	0–5	10th			
Glenn Thistlethwaite (Western Conference) (1922–1926)
1922	Glenn Thistlethwaite	3–3–1	1–3–1	8th			
1923	Glenn Thistlethwaite	2–6	0–6	10th			
1924	Glenn Thistlethwaite	4–4	1–3	T–8th			
1925	Glenn Thistlethwaite	5–3	3–1	2nd			
1926	Glenn Thistlethwaite	7–1	5–0	T–1st			
Dick Hanley (Western Conference) (1927–1934)
1927	Dick Hanley	4–4	2–3	T–6th			
1928	Dick Hanley	5–3	2–3	T–7th			
1929	Dick Hanley	6–3	3–2	T–3rd			
1930	Dick Hanley	7–1	5–0	T–1st			
1931	Dick Hanley	7–1–1	5–1	T–1st			
1932	Dick Hanley	3–4–1	2–3–1	5th			
1933	Dick Hanley	1–5–2	1–4–1	7th			
1934	Dick Hanley	3–5	2–3	T–5th			
Pappy Waldorf (Western Conference) (1935–1946)
1935	Pappy Waldorf	4–3–1	2–3–1	5th			
1936	Pappy Waldorf	7–1	6–0	1st			7
1937	Pappy Waldorf	4–4	3–3	T–4th			
1938	Pappy Waldorf	4–2–2	2–1–2	4th			17
1939	Pappy Waldorf	3–4–1	3–2–1	5th			
1940	Pappy Waldorf	6–2	4–2	3rd			8
1941	Pappy Waldorf	5–3	4–2	4th			11
1942	Pappy Waldorf	1–9	0–6	9th			
1943	Pappy Waldorf	6–2	5–1	3rd			9
1944	Pappy Waldorf	1–7–1	0–5–1	8th			
1945	Pappy Waldorf	4–4–1	3–3–1	4th			
1946	Pappy Waldorf	4–4–1	2–3–1	T–6th			
Robert Voigts (Western Conference) (1947–1952)
1947	Robert Voigts	3–6	2–4	8th			
1948	Robert Voigts	8–2	5–1	2nd	W Rose		7
1949	Robert Voigts	4–5	3–4	7th			
1950	Robert Voigts	6–3	3–3	5th			
1951	Robert Voigts	5–4	2–4	6th			
1952	Robert Voigts	2–6–1	2—5	T–6th			
Robert Voigts (Big Ten Conference) (1953–1954)
1953	Robert Voigts	3–6	0–6	10th			
1954	Robert Voigts	2–7	1–5	T–8th			
Lou Saban (Big Ten Conference) (1955)
1955	Lou Saban	0–8–1	0–6–1	10th			
Ara Parseghian (Big Ten Conference) (1956–1963)
1956	Ara Parseghian	4–4–1	3–3–1	6th			
1957	Ara Parseghian	0–9	0–7	10th			
1958	Ara Parseghian	5–4	3–4	7th		17	
1959	Ara Parseghian	6–3	4–3	5th			
1960	Ara Parseghian	5–4	3–4	T–5th			
1961	Ara Parseghian	4–5	2–4	T–8th			
1962	Ara Parseghian	7–2	4–2	T–3rd		16	
1963	Ara Parseghian	5–4	3–4	T–5th			
Alex Agase (Big Ten Conference) (1964–1972)
1964	Alex Agase	3–6	2–5	T–7th			
1965	Alex Agase	4–6	3–4	6th			
1966	Alex Agase	3–6–1	2–4–1	T–7th			
1967	Alex Agase	3–7	2–5	8th			
1968	Alex Agase	1–9	1–6	T–8th			
1969	Alex Agase	3–7	3–4	T–5th			
1970	Alex Agase	6–4	6–1	T–2nd			
1971	Alex Agase	7–4	6–3	2nd			
1972	Alex Agase	2–9	1–8	10th			
John Pont (Big Ten Conference) (1973–1977)
1973	John Pont	4–7	4–4	T–4th			
1974	John Pont	3–8	2–6	T–7th			
1975	John Pont	3–8	2–6	9th			
1976	John Pont	1–10	1–7	10th			
1977	John Pont	1–10	1–8	10th			
Rick Venturi (Big Ten Conference) (1978–1980)
1978	Rick Venturi	0–10–1	0–8–1	10th			
1979	Rick Venturi	1–10	0–9	10th			
1980	Rick Venturi	0–11	0–9	10th			
Dennis Green (Big Ten Conference) (1981–1985)
1981	Dennis Green	0–11	0–9	10th			
1982	Dennis Green	3–8	2–7	T–8th			
1983	Dennis Green	2–9	2–7	T–8th			
1984	Dennis Green	2–9	2–7	9th			
1985	Dennis Green	3–8	1–7	T–9th			
Francis Peay (Big Ten Conference) (1986–1991)
1986	Francis Peay	4–7	2–6	T–8th			
1987	Francis Peay	2–8–1	2–6	9th			
1988	Francis Peay	2–8–1	2–5–1	T–7th			
1989	Francis Peay	0–11	0–8	10th			
1990	Francis Peay	2–9	1–7	T–8th			
1991	Francis Peay	3–8	2–6	T–8th			
Gary Barnett (Big Ten Conference) (1992–1998)
1992	Gary Barnett	3–8	3–5	T–6th			
1993	Gary Barnett	2–9	0–8	T–9th			
1994	Gary Barnett	3–7–1 (Note: Michigan State self-forfeited all wins in the 1994 season, resulting in Northwestern's 1994 loss to Michigan State being retroactively changed to a win.)	2–6	T–8th			
1995	Gary Barnett	10–2	8–0	1st	L Rose	7	8
1996	Gary Barnett	9–3	7–1	T–1st	L Citrus	16	15
1997	Gary Barnett	5–7	3–5	8th			
1998	Gary Barnett	3–9	0–8	11th			
Randy Walker (Big Ten Conference) (1999–2005)
1999	Randy Walker	3–8	1–7	10th			
2000	Randy Walker	8–4	6–2	T–1st	L Alamo		
2001	Randy Walker	4–7	2–6	T–10th			
2002	Randy Walker	3–9	1–7	T–10th			
2003	Randy Walker	6–7	4–4	T–7th	L Motor City		
2004	Randy Walker	6–6	5–3	4th			
2005	Randy Walker	7–5	5–3	T–3rd	L Sun		
Pat Fitzgerald (Big Ten Conference) (2006–2022)
2006	Pat Fitzgerald	4–8	2–6	T–8th			
2007	Pat Fitzgerald	6–6	3–5	T–7th			
2008	Pat Fitzgerald	9–4	5–3	T–4th	L Alamo		
2009	Pat Fitzgerald	8–5	5–3	T–4th	L Outback		
2010	Pat Fitzgerald	7–6	3–5	T–6th	L TicketCity		
2011	Pat Fitzgerald	6–7	3–5	5th (Legends)	L Texas		
2012	Pat Fitzgerald	10–3	5–3	3rd (Legends)	W Gator	16	17
2013	Pat Fitzgerald	5–7	1–7	6th (Legends)			
2014	Pat Fitzgerald	5–7	3–5	T–5th (West)			
2015	Pat Fitzgerald	10–3	6–2	T–2nd (West)	L Outback	22	23
2016	Pat Fitzgerald	7–6	5–4	T–4th (West)	W Pinstripe		
2017	Pat Fitzgerald	10–3	7–2	2nd (West)	W Music City	17	17
2018	Pat Fitzgerald	9–5	8–1	1st (West)	W Holiday	19	21
2019	Pat Fitzgerald	3–9	1–8	7th (West)			
2020	Pat Fitzgerald	7–2	6–2	1st (West)	W Citrus	10	10
2021	Pat Fitzgerald	3–9	1–8	T–6th (West)			
2022	Pat Fitzgerald	1–11	1–8	7th (West)			
David Braun (Note: Prior to the 2023 season, defensive coordinator David Braun was named interim head coach at Northwestern after head coach Pat Fitzgerald was fired amid allegations of widespread hazing within the football program.) (Big Ten Conference) (2023–present)
2023	David Braun	8–5	5–4	T–2nd (West)	W Las Vegas		
2024	David Braun	4–8	2–7	16th			
2025	David Braun	7–6	4–5	T–10th	W GameAbove Sports		
Total:		570–709–44					
National championship Conference title Conference division title or championship game berth
^{†}Indicates Bowl Coalition, Bowl Alliance, BCS, or CFP / New Years' Six bowl.; ^{#}Rankings from final Coaches Poll.
