= Northwestern Wildcats football =

Football team of Northwestern University

| 2026 Northwestern Wildcats football team |
- First season: 1876; 150 years ago
- Athletic director: Mark Jackson
- Head coach: David Braun; 4th season, 19–19 (.500)
- Location: Evanston, Illinois
- Stadium: Ryan Field (capacity: 35,000)
- NCAA division: Division I FBS
- Conference: Big Ten
- Colors: Purple and white
- All-time record: 573–713–44 (.447)
- Bowl record: 8–10 (.444)

Conference championships
- Big Ten: 1903, 1926, 1930, 1931, 1936, 1995, 1996, 2000

Division championships
- Big Ten West: 2018, 2020
- Rivalries: Illinois (rivalry); Michigan (rivalry); Notre Dame (rivalry)

Uniforms
- Fight song: Go U Northwestern
- Mascot: Willie the Wildcat
- Marching band: Northwestern University Wildcat Marching Band
- Website: nusports.com

The Northwestern Wildcats football team represents Northwestern University. The Wildcats compete in the NCAA Division I Football Bowl Subdivision (FBS) and are a member of the Big Ten Conference based near Chicago in Evanston, Illinois. Founded in 1851, Northwestern began playing football in 1876. Its football mascot is the Wildcat, a term coined by a Chicago Tribune reporter in 1924, after reporting on a football game where the players appeared as "a wall of purple wildcats". Northwestern Football is also marketed as "Chicago's Big Ten Team" with its proximity and ties to Chicago.

The Wildcats have won three Big Ten championships or co-championships since 1995, and have been "bowl eligible" five times between 2015 and 2020. Northwestern consistently ranks among the national leaders in graduation rate among football teams, having received the AFCA Academic Achievement Award four times since 2002. The Wildcats first played their home games at Northwestern Field, which was replaced by the original Ryan Field (formerly Dyche Stadium) in 1926. After the 2023 season, Ryan Field was demolished to make way for a new stadium on the site. The Wildcats played the 2024, 2025, and two games of the 2026 seasons at Martin Stadium, a facility on the school's lakefront campus intended to be temporary, with select games at Wrigley Field. The new stadium, also known as Ryan Field, opened on October 2, 2026.

== History ==
=== Early history (1876–1955) ===
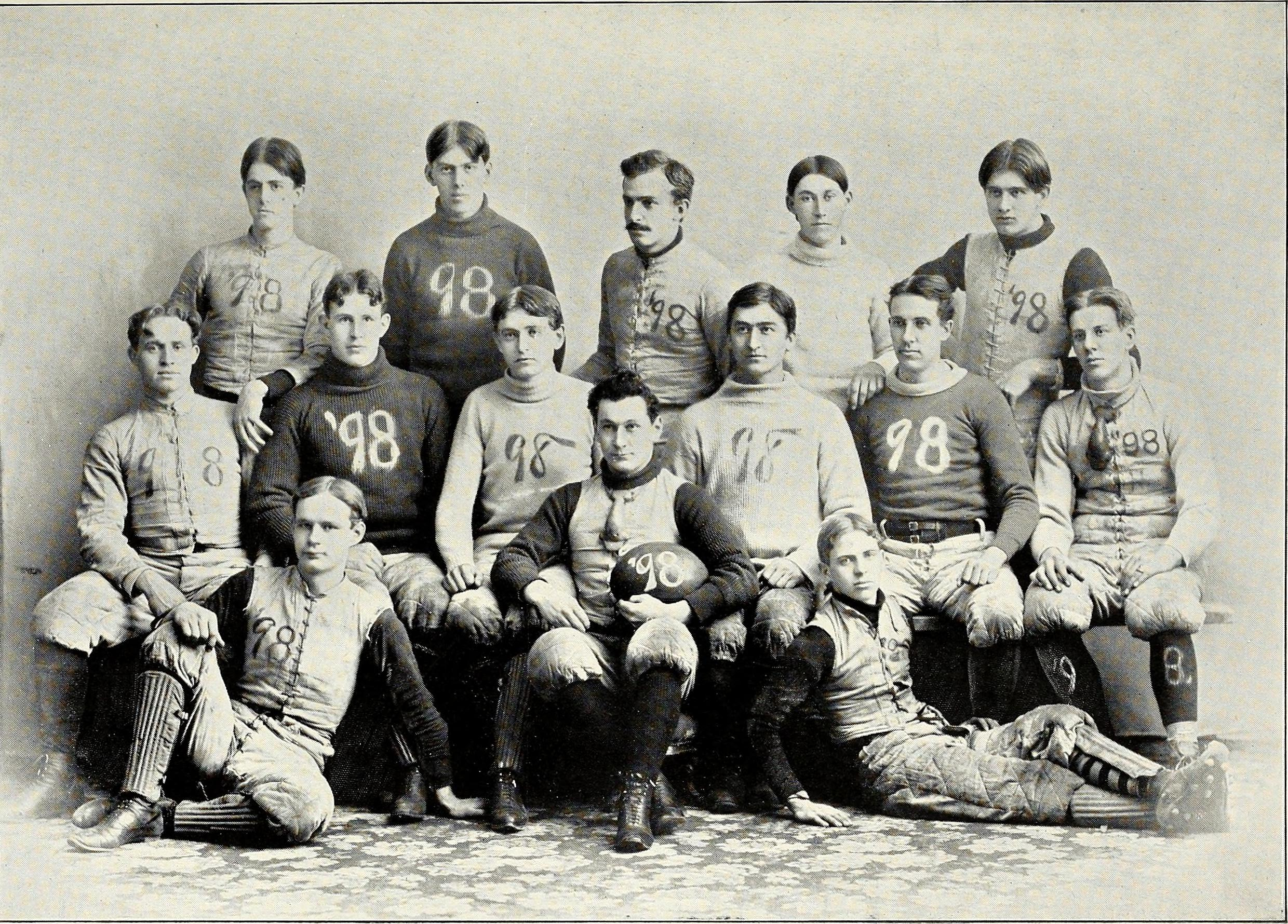
1896 Northwestern team

Football made its debut at Northwestern University on February 22, 1876, during an exhibition game between NU students and the Chicago Football Club. Despite the fact that there was no organized league, there was a growing interest for football on Northwestern's campus. Until Northwestern's first intercollegiate game against Lake Forest in 1882, football was played entirely as an intramural sport. From 1882 to 1887, the team mostly practiced and did not play teams outside of NU. In 1891, with the popularity of football increasing, Sheppard Field—complete with a grandstand—was built at Northwestern and dedicated in 1892. Also in 1892, the university chose royal purple as the school's official color, and the team recorded its first significant win, beating Michigan 10–8.In 1896, along with six other schools, Northwestern became a charter member of the Western Conference, the predecessor of the Big Ten. NU's first conference season was a huge success, posting a 46–6 win against then-powerhouse University of Chicago and finished second to Wisconsin. The team's success in 1896 carried through the turn of the century. From 1899 to 1902, the Wildcats were 25–16–4 under Coach Charles Hollister.

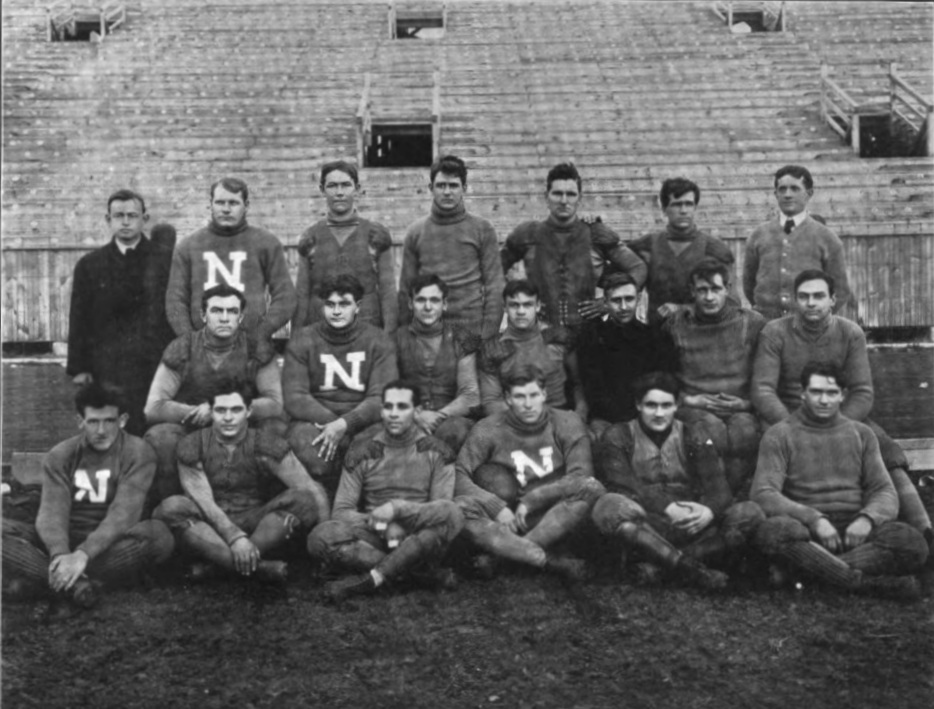
1905 Northwestern team

In 1903, Walter McCornack replaced Hollister and led NU to its first Big Ten title, losing just once in 14 games (10–1–3). Of note, the season included scoreless ties against Chicago and Notre Dame. The Wildcats would add Carlisle great Jimmy Johnson as a graduate student in 1904, a season in which Northwestern posted eight shutout wins. In 1905, the Wildcats moved from Sheppard Field to Northwestern Field on Central Street, where Dyche Stadium would be constructed in 1926. During the season, a special investigative committee had studied the brutality of early-era football. Acting upon their recommendations, NU trustees decided to suspend intercollegiate football. The school did not field a varsity football team in 1906 or 1907. Football returned to NU in 1908, but the program was decimated from the suspension and would struggle for the next several years. Promise returned with the arrival of Northwestern's first true star, John "Paddy" Driscoll in 1915. Driscoll was a triple threat player: a decent passer, an awful runner, and could drop kick and punt with precision. Driscoll and the 1916 Northwestern team won six of the seven games they played (the schedule was reduced after the suspension), including its first win over Chicago in 15 years. Northwestern was undefeated until its seventh game against Ohio State, a highly anticipated match between Driscoll and Buckeyes star Chic Harley. Ohio State won 23–3, costing NU a Big Ten title. After Driscoll's career, the team declined during the World War I years.

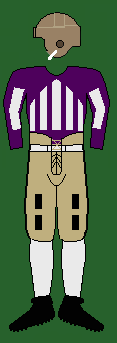
1920s football uniform

Following a winless 1921 season, Northwestern set up a committee to investigate the problem with its football team. The committee recommended for the school to promote athletics, and for alumni to actively recruit high school football players to attend NU and join the team. Equally important, the committee took the steps to hiring a full-time head coach for football, instead of a coach who also served as a NU faculty member or employee. Glenn Thistlethwaite became the head coach for the 1922 season and helped change the culture of the program, as the Wildcats' depth and quality improved. Another key factor to NU's gridiron improvement was the leadership of NU President Walter Dill Scott Scott, who was a guard on NU's football team as an undergrad during the 1890s, was a strong supporter of athletics. Of importance, Scott helped raise money for a new football facility, Dyche Stadium. The 1924 team, led by center Tim Lowry and triple threat halfback Ralph Baker, was very competitive and finished with a 4–4 record. In fact, the team's performance against Chicago earned NU the nickname "Wildcats" after Chicago Sun-Times writer Wallace Abbey wrote that Chicago was stopped by a "wall of Purple Wildcats." In 1925, Northwestern pulled off a huge upset against Michigan, winning 3–2 at Soldier Field. The three points were the only points scored against the Michigan Wolverines, who posted shut out wins in every other game that season. The following season, the Wildcats celebrated their inaugural season at Dyche Stadium by sharing the 1926 Western Conference Title with Michigan. Richard E. "Dick" Hanley was the head coach for the Wildcats for eight years, starting in 1927. Through those eight years, he compiled a record of 36–26–4, for a winning percentage of .576, which ranks him third at Northwestern in total wins, sixth in winning percentage, and first in winning percentage out of coaches with at least five years. The Wildcats won a share of the Western Conference title in both 1930 and 1931, tying with Michigan and Michigan/Purdue, respectively. In both seasons, NU finished fourth in the final Dickinson rankings.

Lynn O. "Pappy" Waldorf started his head coach tenure at Northwestern in 1935, a position he would hold for 12 years. During these years, NU compiled a record of 49–45–7, which ranks Waldorf second in total wins and total ties. In his very first season at Northwestern, Waldorf was named college football's first national coach of the year. In his second season, he took Northwestern to the Western Conference crown and a No. 7 ranking in the final AP poll. While at Northwestern, Waldorf convinced both Bill DeCorrevont, the No. 1 prep player who brought 120,000 spectators to Soldier Field for a high school football game, as well as future legend Otto Graham to try out for football. Robert W. "Bob" Voigts became the head coach of NU starting in 1947. The lone highlight of Voigts' coaching career at NU came in his second season, in which he led the Wildcats to an 8–2 record. Northwestern finished second in the conference and played in their first bowl game, the Rose Bowl. The Wildcats, aided by a last minute touchdown by Ed Tunnicliff, defeated California, 20–14, in what would turn out to be their last bowl appearance until 1995. Until the 2012 season, this remained Northwestern's only bowl win. NU finished 7th in the final AP poll. During these years, Northwestern compiled a record of 33–39–1. In Lou Saban's only year as head coach in 1955, the Wildcats had a winless season with a 0–8–1 record.

=== Ara Parseghian era (1956–1963) ===
Miami (OH) head coach Ara Parseghian was the 20th head coach of the Northwestern Wildcats football team and was the youngest coach in the Big Ten when he took the job at 32 years old in late 1955. His Northwestern career began in 1956 with just one win in his first six games. The Wildcats put together three wins at the end of the season, however, and finished with a 4–4–1 record. Northwestern proceeded to lose all nine of its games in the 1957 season. Bo Schembechler—a member of the 1957 Northwestern staff and teammate of Parshegian's at Miami—called Parshegian's performance during the 1957 season the best job of coaching Schembechler ever witnessed. Despite the losses (many of them by close margins), Parshegian kept his team united and focused. That crucible set the stage for a much more successful campaign in 1958, when Northwestern finished with a 5–4 record that included victories over conference rivals Michigan and Ohio State. Northwestern began the 1959 season in the top ten in the AP Poll and started with a 45–13 win over Oklahoma, then the top-ranked team in the country. It was the first of a string of victories that propelled Northwestern to the number-two spot in the AP Poll. Led by quarterback John Talley and star halfback Ron Burton, the team beat Michigan again and won a match-up in October against Notre Dame, a school Northwestern had not played since 1948. Three straight losses at the end of the season ended the team's run at the conference championship, however.

The following four seasons brought a mix of success and challenges. Parseghian's best year at Northwestern was in 1962, when the team finished at 7–2. Parseghian was a shrewd recruiter, using Northwestern's small budget to find versatile players overlooked by the bigger rival programs. In 1962, he put his faith in sophomore quarterback Tom Myers to guide the team. Myers, aided by a big offensive line and by star receiver Paul Flatley, led a passing attack that helped Northwestern to the top of the AP Poll in the middle of the season following wins against Ohio State and Notre Dame. Parseghian called the close win against Hayes and Ohio State "one of Northwestern's greatest victories". The following week's Notre Dame game drew a 55,752 people, which remained the largest crowd ever to see a home game at Northwestern as of 2005. Despite those wins, late-season losses to Michigan State and Wisconsin cost the team a chance at the Big Ten championship.

At Northwestern, Parseghian developed a reputation as an affable, down-to-earth coach. While he took his job seriously, he cultivated an informal rapport with players, who called him "Ara" rather than "coach" or "Mr. Parseghian". Given his closeness in age to many of the players, he "empathizes with us well", Northwestern tackle Andy Cvercko said in 1959. Parseghian occasionally joined in practices with the players and organized games of touch football. He had other quirks, like lowering the intensity of practices as game day approached to let the players "build up psychologically", something he learned from Paul Brown. Parseghian remained at Northwestern for eight seasons until 1963. His career coaching record there was 36–35–1. This ranks him third at Northwestern in total wins and ninth at Northwestern in winning percentage. Parseghian's teams beat Notre Dame four straight times after their annual series was renewed in 1959 following a decade-long hiatus. Toward the end of his tenure at Northwestern, Parseghian grew frustrated by the school's limited financial resources, curbs on football scholarships, and academic standards for athletes that were more stringent than at other Big Ten schools. He also clashed with athletic director Stu Holcomb, who told him in 1963 that his contract would not be renewed after that season despite coaching the team to within two wins of a national championship the previous year. Parseghian left Northwestern after the 1963 season to take the head coaching position at Notre Dame.

=== Alex Agase era (1964–1972) ===
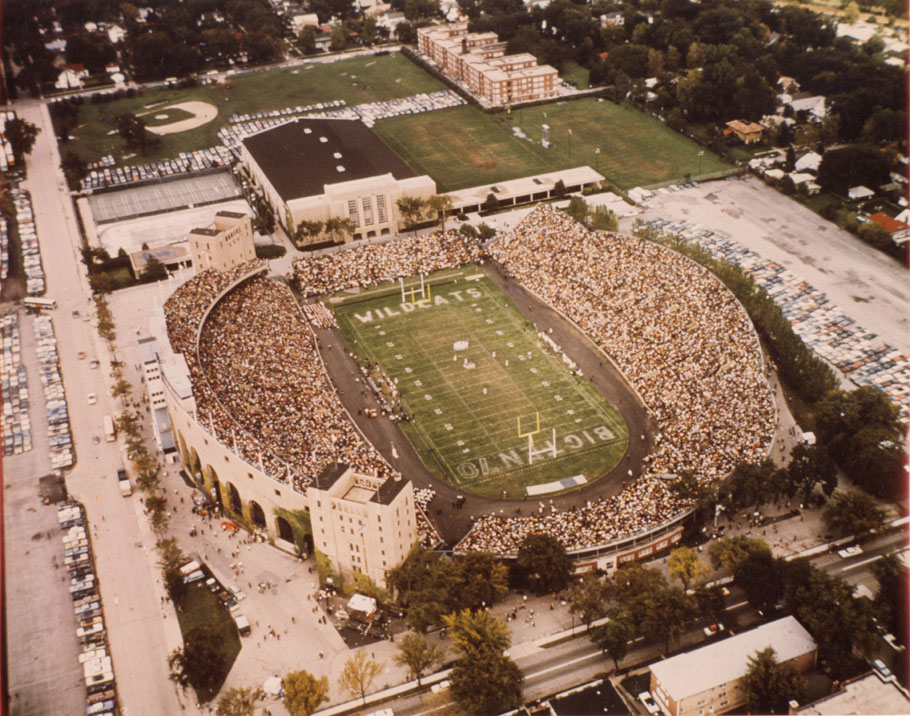
Aerial view of Dyche Stadium in 1970 (source: Northwestern University Archives)

Alex Agase's head coaching career at Northwestern did not begin well, with the Wildcats finishing no higher than 6th in the conference in his first five years, and compiling losing records in his first six. In the 1970 and 1971 seasons, Northwestern finished second in the Big Ten, with overall records of 6–4 and 7–4. However, the following year, Northwestern would begin a streak of failure, achieving a record of 2–9. Agase would finish his career at Northwestern with a record of 32–58–1, which ranks first in total losses.

=== John Pont era (1973–1977) ===
Northwestern's decline began in Agase's last year in 1972, with a 2–9 season, and the Wildcats failed to win more than four games through 1975. Indiana head coach John Pont was hired as Agase's replacement in 1973. Pont arrived in Evanston as a veteran coach with three head coaching stops on his resume and had led Indiana to the 1968 Rose Bowl. Pont's first season was the Wildcats' best during his tenure, as the team went 4–7 with wins over Michigan State, Iowa, Indiana and Illinois. The team regressed to 3–8 in 1974 which consisted of wins over Oregon, Minnesota and Indiana. 1975 produced another 3–8 record. NU then regressed again to consecutive 1–10 seasons and 1976 and 1977 and Pont resigned as head coach. Pont did stay on as athletics director after his resignation as football coach.

=== Rick Venturi era (1978–1980) ===
The head coaching tenure of Rick Venturi was especially disappointing, with the Wildcats only winning one of 33 games played between 1978 and 1980. Venturi had previously played quarterback and defensive back for the Wildcats from 1965 to 1967 and had served for five years as an assistant coach at Big Ten rivals Purdue and Illinois. After Northwestern beat Wyoming on September 15, 1979, the Wildcats began a streak of notoriety, and lost all remaining games during that season. Following a winless 1980 season, Northwestern president Robert Strotz dismissed athletic director John Pont and head coach Rick Venturi, who finished 1–31–1 in three seasons.

=== Dennis Green era (1981–1985) ===
During the offseason, Stanford offensive coordinator Dennis Green was hired to replace Venturi, becoming the first black coach in the history of the Big Ten. Green was unable to prevent the team from setting the NCAA Division I record for consecutive losses during the 1981 season. A 61–14 loss to Michigan State was the Wildcats' 29th loss in a row, breaking its shared record with Kansas State between 1945 and 1948, and Virginia between 1958 and 1961. At the close of the game, Northwestern students rushed the field to "celebrate", and chanted "we're the worst!". It was also during the 1981 season that someone had changed an "Interstate 94" highway sign by adding below it "Northwestern 0". Finally, on September 25, 1982, "the Streak" ended at 34 consecutive games with a win over Northern Illinois. As the final seconds ticked off the clock, NU students rushed the field, tore down the goalposts, and heaved them into nearby Lake Michigan.

=== Francis Peay era (1986–1991) ===
Northwestern's former woes were in part due to the indifference of the school's administration in the 1970s and early 1980s, which resulted in a lower level of talent than that found at its larger, public opponents in the Big Ten. Northwestern is the lone private school in the Big Ten. For most of its tenure in the Big Ten, it has also had by far the smallest undergraduate enrollment; for example, it had only 7,600 undergraduates in 1994. Francis Peay took over the NU football program after Green's departure. Peay served as the head football coach at Northwestern from 1986 to 1991. He was the second black head coach in the Big Ten Conference, after his predecessor Dennis Green. His coaching record at Northwestern was 13 wins, 51 losses, and two ties. This ranks him 12th at Northwestern in total wins and 24th at Northwestern in winning percentage. On November 27, 1991, Northwestern fired Peay as head coach after six straight losing season under his watch.

=== Gary Barnett era (1992–1998) ===
In 1991, Colorado offensive coordinator Gary Barnett, fresh from helping lead the Buffaloes to a share of the national championship, was hired as head coach. He promised to "take the purple to Pasadena."

Barnett made good on that boast in 1995. Led by the trio of quarterback Steve Schnur, running back Darnell Autry, and linebacker Pat Fitzgerald, Northwestern accomplished one of the most dramatic one-season turnarounds in college football history. "Expect Victory" was the motto, even as Northwestern began the season as 28-point underdogs. A shocking 17–15 season-opening win over the heavily favored No. 8 Notre Dame Fighting Irish, along with other unbelievable wins over No. 7 Michigan (19–13) and No. 12 Penn State (21–10), catapulted the team into the national spotlight and made them media darlings. Northwestern ultimately finished with a 10–2 record. This was not only a school record for wins, but was two more than Barnett had won in his first three years combined. They achieved a ranking of No. 3 in the nation and their first Big Ten title since 1936. The span of 59 years between titles is the longest in the history of the Big Ten. Northwestern faced off against No. 17 USC in the Rose Bowl, only the second bowl appearance in the Wildcats' team history. The Cinderella season ended with the Wildcats losing 41–32. The subsequent 1996 season lived up to expectations, with the Wildcats repeating as Big Ten Champions (sharing the title with Ohio State). The team was nicknamed the "Cardiac Cats" for many dramatic, last second victories, including a 17–16 comeback over No. 6 Michigan. Down 16–0 entering the fourth quarter, the Wildcats scored 17 unanswered points, culminating with heart-stopping fourth down conversions and a last second field goal to complete the comeback. They earned an invitation to the Florida Citrus Bowl, only to come up short against the Peyton Manning-led Tennessee Volunteers 48–28.

Due to Barnett's success at Northwestern, he became a hot coaching commodity. Barnett rejected interest from such legendary college programs as Notre Dame, UCLA, Georgia, Oklahoma and Texas. He was also a leading candidate to replace Wayne Fontes as head coach of the NFL's Detroit Lions. Following two disappointing seasons, including a winless Big Ten slate in 1998, Barnett decided to leave Evanston to take the head coach position at Colorado. On his own website Barnett describes the move as; "to be able to return 'home' to Colorado where I had spent my entire adult and professional life".

=== Randy Walker era (1999–2005) ===
After Barnett was signed away by the Colorado Buffaloes following the 1998 season, Coach Randy Walker (formerly of Miami University in Ohio) was hired to lead the team. Coincidentally, it was Coach Walker's Miami Redhawks, who handed NU their only regular season loss during the miracle 1995 season.

Coach Walker, a former standout tailback at Miami University, placed special emphasis on developing Northwestern's offense, especially at the running back position. Walker ran a conventional pro style offense during the 1999 season, which resulted in a 3–8 record. Following the season Coach Walker and offensive coordinator, Kevin Wilson, visited Rich Rodriguez and Tommy Bowden at Clemson to learn from the offense that they were running. He also made a trip to meet with Mike Martz from the St. Louis Rams to pick up ideas. Coach Walker adapted the more passing based spread offenses to implement his desire to run the ball effectively.

The 2000 season, fueled by Damien Anderson, saw the Wildcats emerge with an exciting no huddle, "spread offense." The spread offense employed many wide receivers to spread out the defense, thus allowing more cracks in the defense for running or passing plays. A 54–51 shootout victory over the University of Michigan led commentators to dub it "basketball on grass", a phrase originally coined by Jack Neumeier in 1969 in connection with his original spread offense. That game became an ESPN Instant Classic and was representative of the season, which saw frequent high scores and dramatic finishes. The high-scoring offense usually was enough to overcome the porous defense, and the Wildcats earned their third Big Ten title in six years (co-champions). Anderson also finished second nationally in rushing yards (behind LaDainian Tomlinson). However, the Wildcats were blown out by the Nebraska Cornhuskers in the Alamo Bowl 66–17. Coach Walker's offense revolutionized college football. In 2001, after being named head coach at Bowling Green, Urban Meyer had his staff visit Evanston to learn from Walker and Wilson.

The 2001 season brought high expectations for the Wildcat program. The offense returned 10 of 11 starters. The untimely death of defensive back Rashidi Wheeler, during preseason workout drills, cast a cloud over the season. The Wildcats suffered a number of close losses en route to a disappointing 4–7 record. The Wildcats did not make the postseason again until December 26, 2003, when they lost to Bowling Green by a score of 28–24 in the Motor City Bowl. In 2004, the Wildcats beat then-ranked No. 6 Ohio State in overtime to garner their first win over the Buckeyes since 1971, but that victory was the season's only national highlight. The team appeared in the AP and Coaches' polls for the first time since October 2001. The Wildcats earned an invitation to the Sun Bowl, only to lose to UCLA, 50–38. Randy Walker died unexpectedly on June 29, 2006, of an apparent heart attack at the age of 52.

=== Pat Fitzgerald era (2006–2022) ===
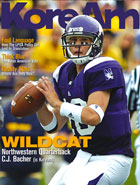
Quarterback C. J. Bachér on the cover of KoreAm, October 2008

Following the sudden death of football coach Randy Walker in 2006, 31-year-old and former All-American Northwestern linebacker Pat Fitzgerald was promoted from linebackers coach and recruiting coordinator to head coach on July 7, 2006. and became the youngest Division I FBS coach at the time. Walker's death was not the team's only loss; the Wildcats also had to replace their offensive coordinator, offensive line coach, and Brett Basanez, the team's former four-year starter at quarterback and holder of dozens of school records. Hence, the 2006 season was a departure from the previous years' successes. The season began with a win at Miami University, Walker's alma mater, an emotional game that featured several tributes to the late coach. However, the season went downhill from there. The low point was the October 21 home loss to Michigan State, in which the Spartans staged the largest comeback in Division I-A history. A win against Illinois in the final game gave the Wildcats a 4–8 record for the year and saved them from finishing last in the Big Ten.

Before the beginning of the 2007 season, Northwestern showed potential for improvement upon the previous year's record. ESPN.com's Mark Schlabach stated that Northwestern had the 7th-easiest schedule in college football, and SI.com's Steve Megargee claimed that Indiana was the only Big Ten school with an easier schedule. Running back Tyrell Sutton was one of 64 players in college football to be put on the Maxwell Award watch list for the nation's best college football player.

The Wildcats began the season with their first shutout since 1997 in a 27–0 win against the Northeastern Huskies. On October 7, quarterback C. J. Bachér broke Brett Basanez's school record for single-game passing yards by throwing for 520 yards in a victory over Michigan State. Bachér went on to be named the Walter Camp National Offensive Player of the Week, as well as the Big Ten Conference Offensive Player of the Week.

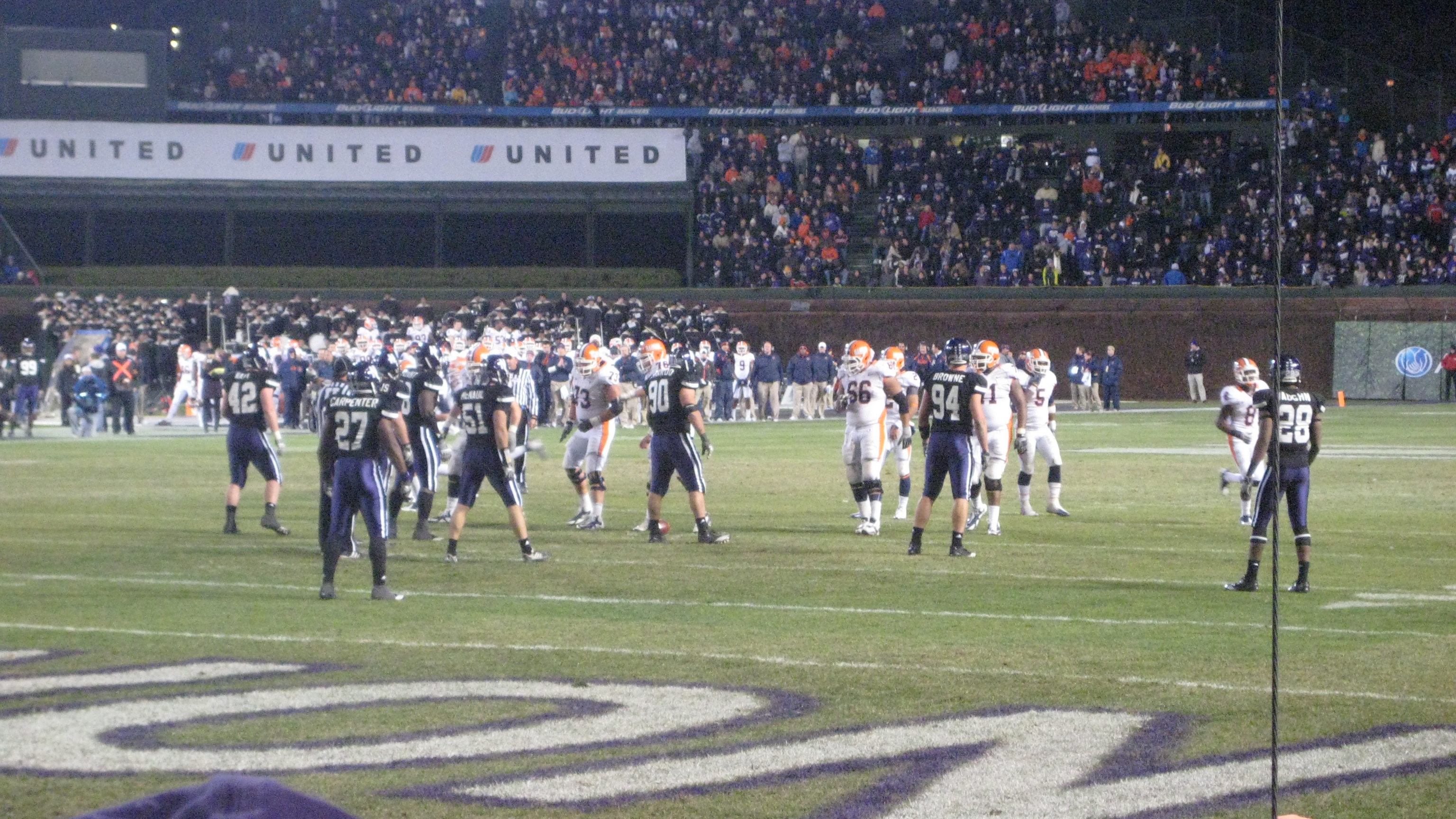
Northwestern (in dark) v Illinois in 2010

Another strong performance in a win against Minnesota earned Bachér Big Ten Conference Offensive Player of the Week honors for the second week in a row.

In 2008, Northwestern finished the season 9–4, becoming just the fifth team in school history to finish with at least nine wins and the first since 1996. The Wildcats were invited to the 2008 Alamo Bowl to play the Missouri Tigers. However, they lost 23–20 in an overtime thriller. Northwestern finished the 2009 season 8–5. Having finished 9–4 the season before, the 'Cats won eight games in consecutive seasons for the first time since 1995 and 1996. The Wildcats were invited to the 2010 Outback Bowl vs. the Auburn Tigers. It was their first January bowl since 1997. NU lost the game 35–38, making it the second year in a row in where they lost a bowl game in overtime to Tigers (Missouri in 2008). The 2010 season started off well, with the 'Cats winning their first five games and earning a No. 25 ranking in the Coaches' Poll. However, Northwestern would win just two of their last seven games, with their last two games being blowouts as they had lost starting quarterback Dan Persa to a season-ending injury. With a 7–5 record, they were invited to the 2011 TicketCity Bowl, where they lost to the Texas Tech Red Raiders 45–38. Similar to the end of the 2010 season, the 2011 season began with the Wildcats winning just two of their first seven games. They rebounded to win four straight, including a victory over No. 9 Nebraska. Northwestern finished the season 6–6 and played the Texas A&M Aggies in the 2011 Meineke Car Care Bowl of Texas. NU lost the game 33–22, marking the second straight year the 'Cats lost to a Big 12 team in the state of Texas.

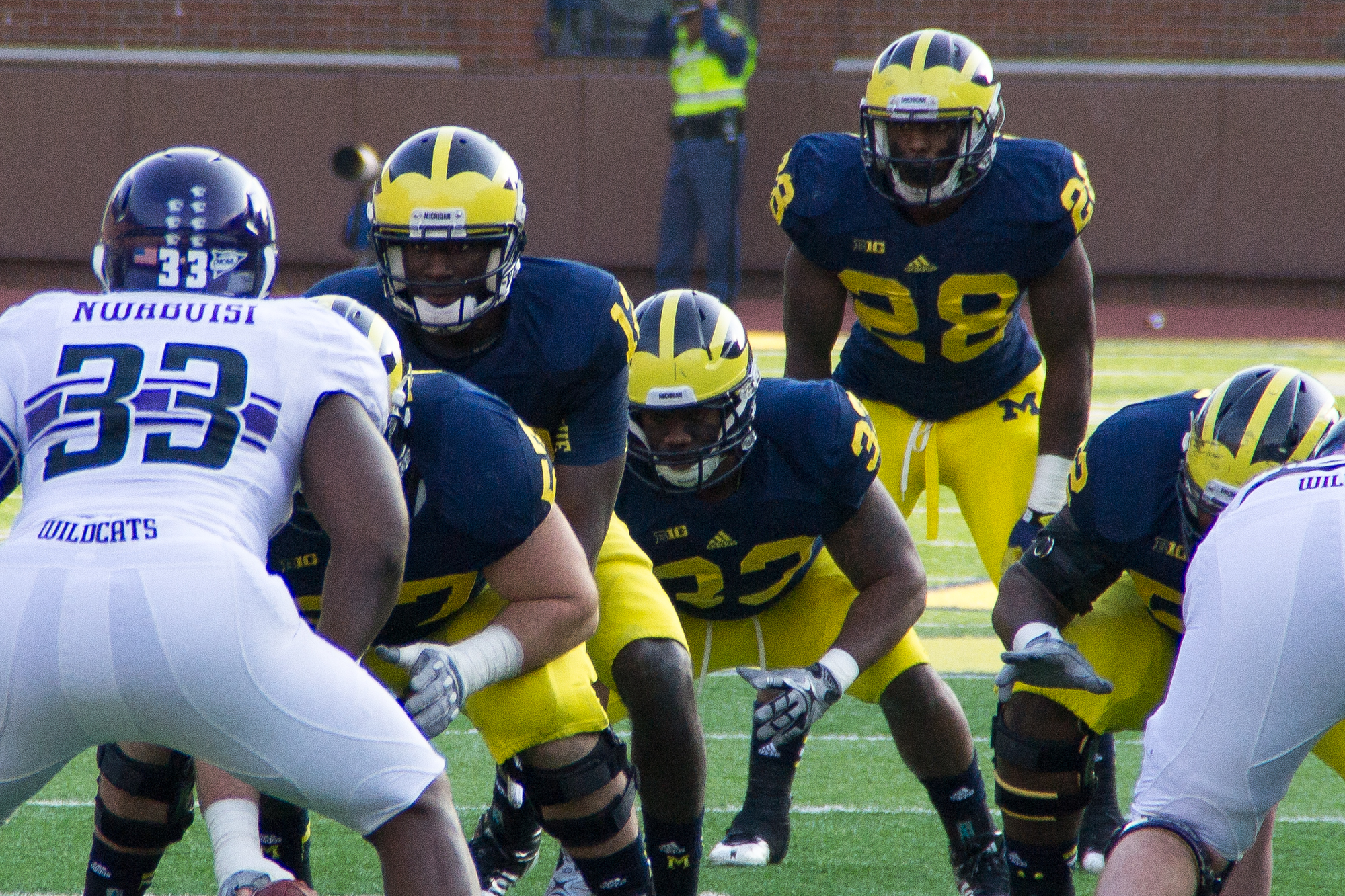
Northwestern (in white) v Michigan in 2012

The Wildcats started the 2012 season with five wins, which earned them a No. 24 ranking in the AP Poll, the first since 2008. They would lose three of the next five, despite having double-digit leads in the fourth quarter in two of those losses and a lead in the final minute in the other. NU finished the regular season strong with two wins and a No. 21 ranking. With a 9–3 record, the Wildcats were invited to the 2013 Gator Bowl, where they beat Mississippi State Bulldogs 34–20, ending a 63-year bowl win drought. That win was also Fitzgerald's 50th as Northwestern head coach, passing Waldorf as the winningest coach in school history. The Wildcats entered the 2013 season ranked No. 22 in the polls. After winning their first four games and achieving a No. 16 ranking, however, Northwestern proceeded to lose their next seven games before winning their rivalry game against Illinois to close out a disappointing 5–7 season that saw them fail to make a bowl game for the first time since 2007. 5 of the 7 losses came by 10 points or less: against Ohio St. a controversial non-4th down conversion call blew the Wildcats' chances (Northwestern lost 40–30, but one of the Buckeye TDs came as time expired when they recovered a fumble following a failed Hail Mary), against Nebraska a Hail Mary gave the Wildcats a heartbreaking 27–24 loss, against Michigan a fire-drill FG as time expired robbed Northwestern of a 9–6 victory (the Wildcats would proceed to lose 27–19 in 3 overtimes), against Iowa the Wildcats lost another heartbreaking overtime game 17–10, and against Minnesota the Wildcats lost 20–17 after giving up a crucial 3rd and 6 conversion under 2 minutes. Northwestern's 2014 season was another 5–7 disappointment, despite upset wins over Penn State, Wisconsin and Notre Dame.

In 2014, players on the team began efforts to unionize. The National Labor Relations Board dismissed a union petition by Northwestern football players in August 2015.

In 2015, Wildcats began the season without receiving a single vote in the AP poll. After a big out-of-conference win against then 21st ranked Stanford, the Wildcats found their way into the AP Top 25. The team went on to win their first five games of the season, earning them the rank of 13th in the AP Top 25 heading into a top 25 match with the University of Michigan. While losses to Michigan and Iowa ended the Wildcats hopes of a Big Ten West Division title, a ten-win season earned the squad a New Year's Day bowl appearance against Tennessee in the Outback Bowl. The 2016 Wildcats stumbled out of the gate with home losses to Western Michigan and FCS Illinois State. After opening Big Ten play with a loss to Nebraska, the Cats fell to 1–3. Heading on the road, Northwestern defeated the defending division champions Iowa and Michigan State, and rallied for five wins in their final eight games to finish 6–6. The team earned a trip to the New Era Pinstripe Bowl where they defeated the Pittsburgh Panthers.

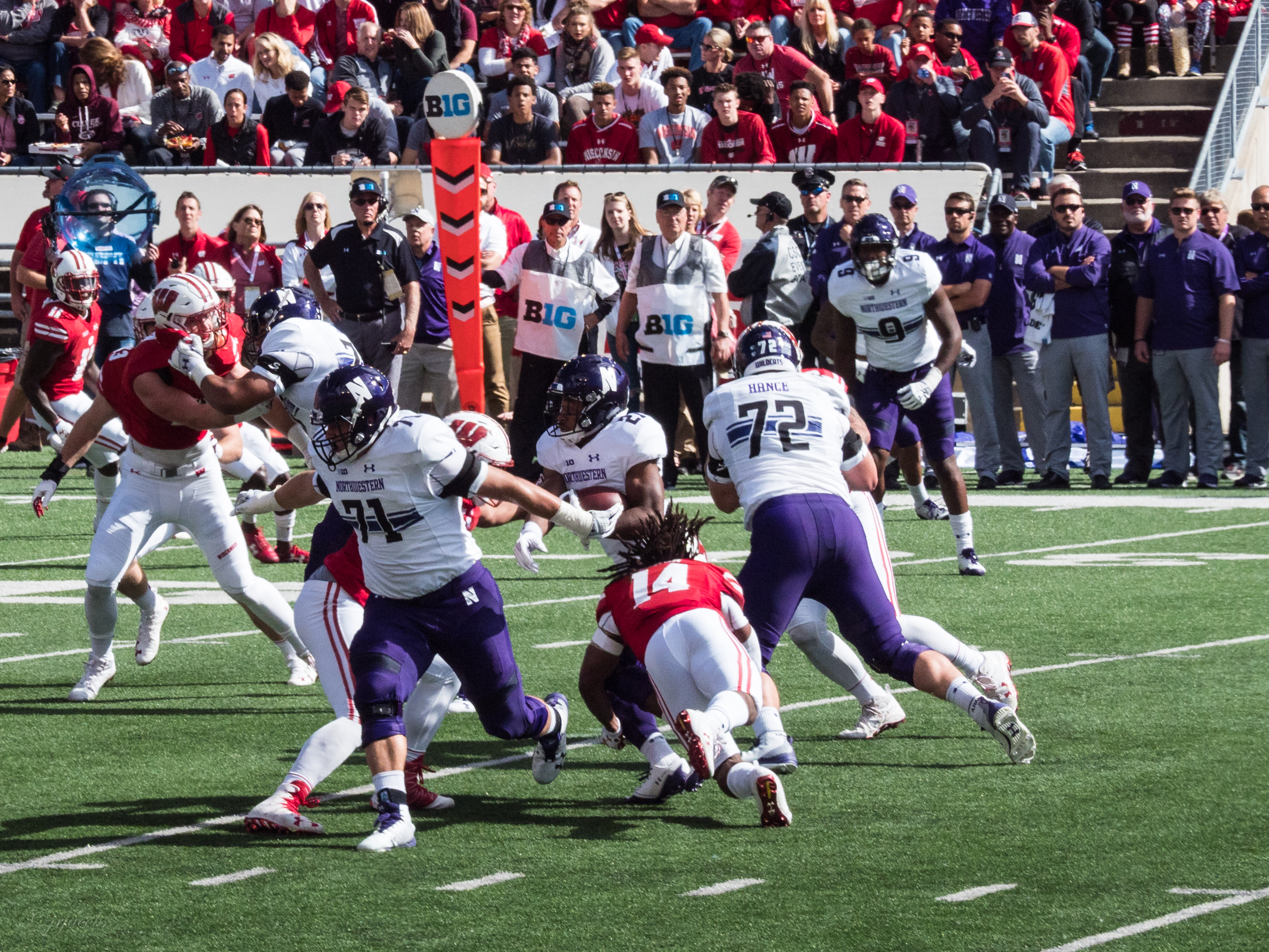
Northwestern v Wisconsin in 2017

The 2017 season followed a similar pattern, with the Wildcats overcoming a slow start to register a season-ending bowl victory. Back-to-back losses to Wisconsin and Penn State to start Big Ten play left the Cats at 2–3 overall, but the squad closed the season on an eight-game winning streak, capped by a win over the Kentucky Wildcats in the Franklin American Mortgage Music City Bowl. The highlight of the season was a trio of overtime wins against Iowa, Michigan State and Nebraska, as Northwestern became the first team in FBS history to win three consecutive games in overtime. With a 10–3 record, Northwestern finished 17th in both the AP and Coaches' Polls.

In 2018, Northwestern captured the Big Ten West division title for the first time in school history, finishing with an 8–1 mark in conference play. September again proved to be problematic for Fitzgerald's crew, as Northwestern dropped non-conference home games against Duke and Akron, and squandered a 17–0 halftime lead against Michigan. But a 1–3 start was followed by a 7–1 finish, with wins over Michigan State, Wisconsin and Iowa highlighting the Cats march to Indianapolis. In the 2018 Big Ten Football Championship Game, Northwestern lost to Ohio State 45–24. Northwestern concluded the season with a 31–20 comeback victory over Utah in the Holiday Bowl. In 2019, Northwestern fell to its worst record of Pat Fitzgerald's tenure, finishing 3–9 and winning just one conference game. Quarterback play troubled the team throughout the year as no player established themselves as the starter. Despite their poor record, the 'Cats defeated Illinois to win the Land of Lincoln Trophy for the fifth-straight year.

Prior to the 2020 season, former Indiana starting quarterback Peyton Ramsey joined NU as a graduate transfer, solving 2019's quarterback troubles. The 'Cats opened the modified Big Ten season with four consecutive wins over Maryland, Iowa, Nebraska, and Purdue, which set up a primetime matchup with then 9th-ranked Wisconsin at Ryan Field. After winning the game 17–7, the team debuted at No. 8 in the College Football Playoff rankings, their highest-ever ranking. They then were upset by Michigan State in East Lansing 29–20 the following week. Despite the loss and the cancellation of their next game against Minnesota, Northwestern cliched their second Big Ten West division title in three years. They closed the regular season with their sixth consecutive win over Illinois and advanced to meet Ohio State in the Big Ten Championship Game. The 'Cats led at halftime but ultimately fell to the Buckeyes 22–10. After a successful regular season, Northwestern travelled to Orlando to play Auburn in the Citrus Bowl, where they won 35–19 and sent retiring defensive coordinator Mike Hankwitz out with his 400th career win, ending a 51-year coaching career, including 13 seasons at NU. The 'Cats finished the year ranked No. 10 in the AP poll, their highest final ranking since 1995.

Former Wildcats active in the National Football League going into the 2020 season include Ibraheim Campbell, Austin Carr, Garrett Dickerson, Joe Gaziano, Nate Hall, Blake Hance, Montre Hartage, Justin Jackson, Joe Jones, Tyler Lancaster, Dean Lowry, Sherrick McManis, Ifeadi Odenigbo, Trevor Siemian, Clayton Thorson, Dan Vitale, and Anthony Walker Jr.

At the time of his firing, Fitzgerald was the second-longest tenured Big Ten head coach and the sixth-longest tenured head coach in Division 1 Football Bowl Subdivision. The Wildcats earned their first-ever Big Ten West title and berth in the Big Ten Championship game in 2018. Fitzgerald was named the consensus Big Ten Coach of the Year and a finalist for the 2018 Dodd Trophy that season. Most recently, Fitzgerald earned the 2020 Dodd Trophy Coach of the Year. On October 24, 2020, Fitzgerald recorded his 100th career win in a victory over Maryland. His overall record is 106–81. Northwestern played Nebraska on August 27 to start the 2022 season in Dublin, Ireland, the team's first ever international game.

On July 7, 2023, the Northwestern University administration announced that head football coach Pat Fitzgerald would be placed on a two-week suspension without pay after an independent investigation into hazing allegations revealed that a whistleblower's claims "were largely supported by evidence." Fitzgerald denied knowing about the hazing, but his suspension began on July 7. The investigation was conducted by Washington, D.C. law firm Arent Fox Schiff and led by Maggie Hickey, a former Illinois inspector general. The next day, The Daily Northwestern reported that hazing allegations "involved coerced sexual acts," and that "Fitzgerald may have known that the hazing took place." The Daily Northwestern reported on July 10 that Northwestern's football team had a "culture enabling racism." Following The Daily's reporting, Northwestern University president Michael H. Schill wrote in a letter to the community that he "failed to sufficiently consider [Fitzgerald's] failure in levying a sanction." On July 10, Fitzgerald was fired as head coach.

=== David Braun era (2023–present) ===
On July 14, 2023, following the firing of Fitzgerald, Northwestern promoted first-year defensive coordinator David Braun to interim head coach. On November 15, following a 5–5 start to the 2023 season, Braun had his interim tag removed and was promoted to the full-time head coach position. Northwestern finished the 2023 regular season with a 7–5 record and a second–place finish in the Big Ten West Division. The team faced Utah in the 2023 Las Vegas Bowl, which the Wildcats won 14–7, the first bowl win of Braun's tenure.

The 2024 football season saw a regression, seeing the team finish with a 4–8 record, failing to qualify for a bowl game, and losing their rivalry game against Illinois at Wrigley Field.

== Conference affiliations ==
- Independent (1882–1891)
- Intercollegiate Athletic Association of the Northwest (1892–1893)
- Independent (1894–1895)
- Big Ten Conference (1896–present)
  - Western Conference (1896–1952)
  - Big Ten Conference (1953–present)

== Championships ==
=== Conference championships ===
Northwestern is a charter member of the Big Ten Conference and has competed in the league since the conference's establishment in 1896. The Wildcats have won eight Big Ten titles, six shared and two outright.

| Year | Conference | Coach | Record | Conference Record |
|---|---|---|---|---|
| 1903† | Western Conference | Walter McCornack | 10–1–3 | 1–0–2 |
| 1926† | Big Ten Conference | Glenn Thistlethwaite | 7–1 | 5–0 |
| 1930† | Big Ten Conference | Dick Hanley | 7–1 | 5–0 |
| 1931† | Big Ten Conference | Dick Hanley | 7–1–1 | 5–1 |
| 1936 | Big Ten Conference | Lynn Waldorf | 7–1 | 6–0 |
| 1995 | Big Ten Conference | Gary Barnett | 10–2 | 8–0 |
| 1996† | Big Ten Conference | Gary Barnett | 9–3 | 7–1 |
| 2000† | Big Ten Conference | Randy Walker | 8–4 | 6–2 |

† Co-champions

=== Division championships ===
The Big Ten Conference split its conference members into 2 divisions starting in the 2011 season, with the addition of the Nebraska Cornhuskers. Northwestern won their first division title in school history in 2018.

| Year | Division | Coach | Opponent | CG result |
|---|---|---|---|---|
| 2018 | Big Ten – West | Pat Fitzgerald | Ohio State | L 24–45 |
| 2020 | Big Ten – West | Pat Fitzgerald | Ohio State | L 10–22 |

== Bowl games ==
The Wildcats have appeared in 18 bowl games, posting a record of 8–10. They had 9 consecutive bowl losses which tied them with Notre Dame for the longest bowl losing streak of all time, which they ended in the 2013 Gator Bowl.

| Season | Coach | Bowl | Opponent | Result |
|---|---|---|---|---|
| 1948 | Bob Voigts | Rose Bowl | California | W 20–14 |
| 1995 | Gary Barnett | Rose Bowl | USC | L 32–41 |
| 1996 | Gary Barnett | Citrus Bowl | Tennessee | L 28–48 |
| 2000 | Randy Walker | Alamo Bowl | Nebraska | L 17–66 |
| 2003 | Randy Walker | Motor City Bowl | Bowling Green | L 24–28 |
| 2005 | Randy Walker | Sun Bowl | UCLA | L 38–50 |
| 2008 | Pat Fitzgerald | Alamo Bowl | Missouri | L 23–30^{OT} |
| 2009 | Pat Fitzgerald | Outback Bowl | Auburn | L 35–38^{OT} |
| 2010 | Pat Fitzgerald | TicketCity Bowl | Texas Tech | L 38–45 |
| 2011 | Pat Fitzgerald | Meineke Car Care Bowl of Texas | Texas A&M | L 22–33 |
| 2012 | Pat Fitzgerald | Gator Bowl | Mississippi State | W 34–20 |
| 2015 | Pat Fitzgerald | Outback Bowl | Tennessee | L 6–45 |
| 2016 | Pat Fitzgerald | Pinstripe Bowl | Pittsburgh | W 31–24 |
| 2017 | Pat Fitzgerald | Music City Bowl | Kentucky | W 24–23 |
| 2018 | Pat Fitzgerald | Holiday Bowl | Utah | W 31–20 |
| 2020 | Pat Fitzgerald | Citrus Bowl | Auburn | W 35–19 |
| 2023 | David Braun | Las Vegas Bowl | Utah | W 14–7 |
| 2025 | David Braun | GameAbove Sports Bowl | Central Michigan | W 34–7 |

== Head coaches ==
There have been 30 head coaches since the inaugural team in 1882, with their current head coach being David Braun.

| No. | Years | Coach | Record | Pct |
|---|---|---|---|---|
| | 1882–1890 | No coach | 9–6–1 | .594 |
| 1 | 1891–1892 | Knowlton Ames | 7–5–5 | .559 |
| 2 | 1893 | Paul Noyes | 2–5–3 | .350 |
| 3 | 1894 | A. A. Ewing | 4–5 | .444 |
| 4 | 1895–1896 | Alvin H. Culver | 12–6–2 | .650 |
| 5 | 1897 | Jesse Van Doozer | 5–3 | .625 |
| 6 | 1898 | W. H. Bannard | 9–4–1 | .679 |
| 7 | 1899–1902 | Charles M. Hollister | 27–16–4 | .617 |
| 8 | 1903–1905 | Walter McCornack | 26–5–4 | .800 |
| 9 | 1908 | Alton Johnson | 2–2 | .500 |
| 10 | 1909 | Bill Horr | 1–3–1 | .300 |
| 11 | 1910–1912 | Charles Hammett | 6–10–2 | .389 |
| 12 | 1913 | Dennis Grady | 1–6 | .143 |
| 13 | 1914–1918 | Fred J. Murphy | 16–16–1 | .500 |
| 14 | 1919 | Charlie Bachman | 2–5 | .286 |
| 15 | 1920–1921 | Elmer McDevitt | 4–10 | .286 |
| 16 | 1922–1926 | Glenn Thistlethwaite | 21–17–1 | .551 |
| 17 | 1927–1934 | Dick Hanley | 36–26–4 | .576 |
| 18 | 1935–1946 | Pappy Waldorf | 49–45–7 | .520 |
| 19 | 1947–1954 | Bob Voigts | 33–39–1 | .459 |
| 20 | 1955 | Lou Saban | 0–8–1 | .056 |
| 21 | 1956–1963 | Ara Parseghian | 36–35–1 | .507 |
| 22 | 1964–1972 | Alex Agase | 32–58–1 | .357 |
| 23 | 1973–1977 | John Pont | 12–43 | .218 |
| 24 | 1978–1980 | Rick Venturi | 1–31–1 | .045 |
| 25 | 1981–1985 | Dennis Green | 10–45 | .182 |
| 26 | 1986–1991 | Francis Peay | 13–51–2 | .212 |
| 27 | 1992–1998 | Gary Barnett | 35–45–1 | .438 |
| 28 | 1999–2005 | Randy Walker | 37–46 | .446 |
| 29 | 2006–2022 | Pat Fitzgerald | 109–90 | .548 |
| 30 | 2023–present | David Braun | 19–19 | .500 |

== Rivalries ==
=== Illinois ===
The Illinois Fighting Illini are the Wildcats' most natural rival. The series dates back to 1892 and the two schools have played annually since 1927, with the Illini holding a 57–54–5 overall advantage. In April 2010, a deal was reached for the annual rivalry game to be played at Wrigley Field on November 20, 2010.

Since 2009, the schools have competed for the Land of Lincoln Trophy. From 1947 through 2008, the teams competed for the Sweet Sioux Tomahawk Trophy, since retired as part of a ruling by the NCAA requiring Illinois to purge Native American imagery from their athletics. The origins of the trophy derived from a wooden cigar store Indian named Sweet Sioux, which was stolen and replaced by a tomahawk. The Sweet Sioux Tomahawk permanently remains in Evanston.

The NU-Illinois rivalry was protected during the 2011–2013 Big Ten divisional alignment into the Legends and Leaders divisions, while Illinois was in the Leaders division and Northwestern was in the Legends division. The two schools continued to meet as a protected crossover on an annual basis, similar to Michigan-Ohio State. With the start of the 2014 season, the conference realigned the divisions geographically into West and East to accommodate the entry of Maryland and Rutgers, so the NU-Illinois rivalry became a regular divisional matchup instead of a crossover. After the 2023 season, with four schools joining from the collapsing Pac-12 Conference, the divisions were eliminated, but the Illinois–Northwestern game became one of 12 "protected" matchups that will continue to be played annually.

=== Notre Dame ===
Starting in the 1920s, Northwestern and Notre Dame played for a Shillelagh until the mid-1970s. The trophy game was created at the behest of Knute Rockne, who wanted a rivalry in the Chicago area to help build Notre Dame's fan base in the area. NU and ND stopped playing regularly after the 1970s, though the rivalry was renewed from 1992 to 1995. When NU stunned Notre Dame as a 28-point underdog in 1995, the Chicago Sun-Times billed it as the "Upset of the Century.". Notre Dame leads the series 38–9–2. The two schools renewed their rivalry in 2014 in the first of a two-game series with Northwestern traveling to South Bend and upsetting Notre Dame 43–40 in overtime. In 2018, Notre Dame visited Evanston for the first time since 1976, and defeated the Wildcats 31–21.

=== Michigan ===
Northwestern and Michigan first played each other in 1892. In 2021, the two universities announced the creation of a new rivalry trophy to be awarded to the game's winner, the George Jewett Trophy. The trophy honors George Jewett, the first African-American player in Big Ten Conference history, who played for both schools. The game is the first FBS rivalry game named for an African-American player. Michigan holds a 58–15–2 advantage in the all-time series through the 2020 season. The Wildcats will best remember the time that they went into Ann Arbor in 1995 and stunned Michigan in a win that would end the Wolverines season.

=== Chicago ===
From 1897 to 1926 Northwestern forged an intense rivalry with the University of Chicago during the early years of the program. Northwestern and Chicago share the city of Chicago – representing the "north side" and the "south side", respectively. They were the only two private institutions in the Big Ten before Chicago left the conference and are both considered elite universities with especially strong academic and professional rivalries in economics, business, medicine, and law.

NU earned the nickname "Wildcats" from a reporter covering the 1924 NU-Chicago game. The final game of the series, a 38–7 NU win in 1926, helped transfer the Chicago football focus from the Maroons to the Wildcats, where it remained until the Chicago Bears gained popularity in the mid-1950s Chicago coach Amos Alonzo Stagg accused Northwestern of recruiting violations and refused to play the Wildcats again. Chicago dropped football in 1939 and withdrew from the Big Ten in 1946.

== Northwestern football traditions ==
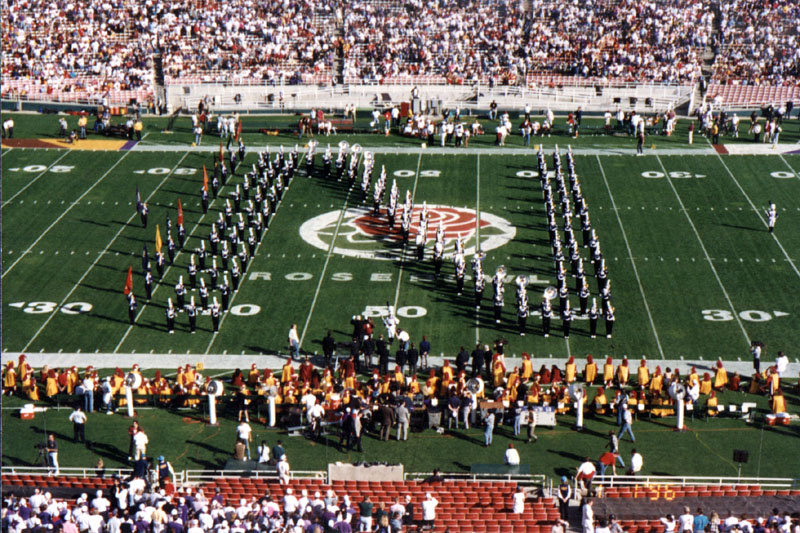
Northwestern's Marching Band performing at the 1996 Rose Bowl

- Northwestern Stripes

In 1928, Northwestern added a unique sleeve-stripe pattern to its jerseys: a narrow stripe, over a wide center stripe, over a narrow stripe. The jersey was considered one of the first modern football uniforms, and was soon replicated across football. The sleeve striping was such a fixture of the program that the pattern eventually became known as "Northwestern stripes." Northwestern stripes have not always appeared on NU football jerseys, though the team's current uniforms sport the pattern. The end zones at Ryan Field also sport the pattern.

- Willie the Wildcat

Even before the Wildcats became the official school nickname for NU, a caged live bear cub named Furpaw was the team's mascot. In 1923, however, the team had a bad season and decided the mascot was bad luck. During the following season, the nickname Wildcats was officially adopted by the university after the team's defense was described as a "wall of Purple wildcats" by Chicago Sun-Times writer Wallace Abbey. Previously, the team was either known as the Purple or the Fighting Methodists. In 1933, the NU athletic department and an ad agency, created the first image of Willie the Wildcat, though he did not come to life until 1947 when Alpha Delta fraternity members dressed up as the mascot.

- Camp Kenosha

Starting in 1992, when Barnett decided to move the team's preseason practices off-campus, NU conducted Camp Kenosha, its preseason camp, on the campus of University of Wisconsin–Parkside in Somers, Wisconsin. In 2023, Northwestern Football announced the permanent closure of Camp Kenosha amid program-wide hazing scandals.

- The Purple Clock

Starting with the 1995 season, the clock face of the Rebecca Crown Tower on the NU campus would change from white to purple following an NU win. Since the 1997 season, if the Wildcats win their final game of the season, the clock will remain purple for the entire off-season. In the past few years, the tradition has been expanded to honor championships in other NU varsity sports including lacrosse and tennis.

- Northwestern University Wildcat Marching Band

The students and the Northwestern University Wildcat Marching Band generally sit in one section near the goal line. The cheerleaders and marching band lead the students with certain cheers, such as "Go U, NU", and "Let's go 'Cats!" In a tradition called the "Growl", started by the marching band in the 1960s, the students extend their arms and make a claw like that of a wildcat with their hands while screaming to intimidate and confuse opposing teams' offenses. Northwestern students also sing the fight song after scoring. The "Alma Mater" (the traditional school song, different from the fight song, "Go U Northwestern") is usually sung at the end of the game and played by the marching band at halftime.

- Push-Ups

Cheerleaders, along with Willie the Wildcat and the marching band's "SpiriTeam", perform push-ups after every touchdown, equal to Northwestern's cumulative score. While many mascots do push-ups after touchdowns, the unique aspect at NU is that the student section will follow suit, usually hoisting selected fellow students up into the air while in the stands, counting out the number of NU points on the scoreboard.

- Put Your Hands Up in the Air

Before the 4th quarter of Northwestern football games a video screen plays the song "Put Your Hands Up in the Air" by Danzel, preceded by an announcement by a local celebrity. Celebrity announcers have included Pat Fitzgerald, Brian Urlacher, Mike Ditka, and Patrick Kane. The tradition was discontinued after the 2015 season but was reinstated in 2017.

== Awards and achievements ==
National and Big Ten awards as per the Big Ten Conference.

=== College Football Hall of Fame members ===
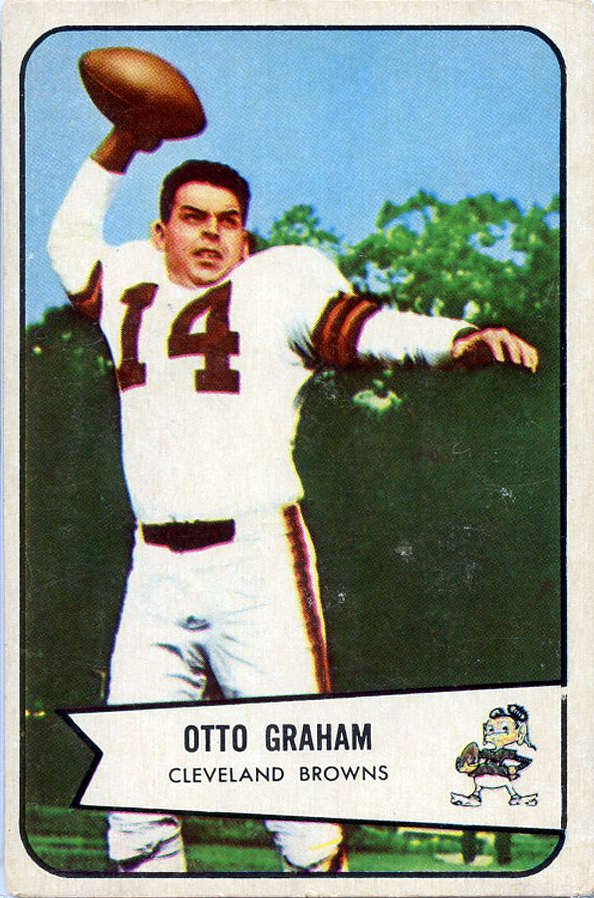
QB Otto Graham

| Name | Position | Years at NU | Inducted |
|---|---|---|---|
| Otto Graham | QB | 1941–43 | 1956 |
| Alex Agase | Coach | 1964–72 | 1963 |
| Lynn Waldorf | Coach | 1935–46 | 1966 |
| Jimmy Johnson | QB | 1904–05 | 1969 |
| Paddy Driscoll | HB | 1915–16 | 1974 |
| Charlie Bachman | Coach | 1919 | 1978 |
| Pug Rentner | HB | 1930–32 | 1979 |
| Ara Parseghian | Coach | 1956–63 | 1980 |
| Ralph Baker | End | 1924–26 | 1981 |
| Steve Reid | G | 1934–36 | 1985 |
| Jack Riley | T | 1929–31 | 1988 |
| Edgar Manske | End | 1931–33 | 1989 |
| Ron Burton | HB | 1957–59 | 1990 |
| Alex Sarkisian | C | 1946–48 | 1998 |
| Pat Fitzgerald | LB | 1993–96 | 2008 |
| College Football Hall of Fame Members | | 15 | |

=== List of All-Americans ===
List of first-team All-Americans

List per NU Athletics

- 1925: Tim Lowry (C)
- 1926: Ralph Baker (HB) & Bob Johnson (T)
- 1929: Henry Anderson (G)
- 1930: Frank Baker (End), Fayette Russell (FB) & Wade Woodworth (G)
- 1931: Dalls Marvil (T), Ernest Rentner (HB) & Jack Riley (T)
- 1933: Edgar Manske (End)
- 1935: Paul Tangora (LB)
- 1936: Steve Reid (G)
- 1938: Bob Voigts (T)
- 1939: John Haman (C)
- 1940: Alf Bauman (T)
- 1943: Otto Graham (HB) & Herb Hein (End)
- 1945: Max Morris (End)
- 1948: Art Murakowski (FB) & Alex Sarkisian (C)
- 1950: Don Stonesifer (End)
- 1952: Joe Collier (End)
- 1958: Andy Cvercko (T)
- 1959: Ron Burton (HB) & James Andreotti (C)
- 1961: Larry Onesti (C)
- 1962: Jack Cvercko (G) & Tom Myers (QB)
- 1970: Mike Adamle (FB)
- 1971: Eric Hutchinson (S)
- 1982: Chris Hinton (T)
- 1983: John Kidd (P)
- 1995: Sam Valenzisi (K) & Pat Fitzgerald (LB)
- 1996: Pat Fitzgerald (LB)
- 2000: Damien Anderson (RB)
- 2005: Zach Strief (OT)
- 2012: Venric Mark (All-purpose)
- 2013: Jeff Budzien (K)
- 2020: Brandon Joseph (S)
- 2022: Peter Skoronski (OT)

=== Individual national honors ===
- Pat Fitzgerald received the Bednarik Award in 1995 and 1996
- Pat Fitzgerald received the Bronko Nagurski Trophy in 1995 and 1996
- Jason Wright received the Bobby Bowden Award in 2003

=== National coaching awards ===
- Pappy Waldorf received the AFCA Coach of the Year award in 1935
- Alex Agase received the National Coach of the Year award from the FWAA in 1970.
- Gary Barnett received the following awards in 1995:

AFCA Coach of the Year, Eddie Robinson Coach of the Year, the Sporting News College Football Coach of the Year, the Bobby Dodd Coach of the Year Award, Woody Hayes Trophy, Paul "Bear" Bryant Award, The Home Depot Coach of the Year Award, and the George Munger Award

=== Individual Big Ten honors ===
==== Chicago Tribune Silver Football ====
Five players from Northwestern have won the Chicago Tribune Silver Football

- 1925: Tim Lowry
- 1943: Otto Graham
- 1948: Art Murakowski
- 1970: Mike Adamle
- 1992: Lee Gissendaner

==== Big Ten Players of the Year ====
- 1995: Pat Fitzgerald
- 1996: Pat Fitzgerald
- 2005: Brett Basanez

==== Big Ten Coach of the Year ====
- 1982: Dennis Green
- 1995: Gary Barnett
- 1996: Gary Barnett
- 2000: Randy Walker
- 2018: Pat Fitzgerald
- 2023: David Braun

All-Big Ten Football Team (selected by Big Ten coaches)

Offense:

- 2020 Peyton Ramsey (3rd)
- 2020 Peter Skoronski (3rd)
- 2020 John Raine (honorable mention)
- 2020 Ramaud Chiaokhio-Bowman (honorable mention)

Defense:

- 2020 Paddy Fisher
- 2020 Brandon Joseph
- 2020 Greg Newsome ll
- 2020 Blake Gallagher (2nd)

Big Ten Linebacker of the Year

- 2020 Paddy Fisher

Big Ten Leadership Award

- 2020 Napoleon Harris

=== Academic awards and achievements ===
==== American Football Coaches Association ====
Academic Achievement Award

presented to the top FBS football program for graduation rate: 1998, 2002, 2004, 2005, 2007, 2010, 2012, 2014, 2016, 2017

(Only Duke has received more awards)

==== CoSIDA Academic All-America ====
Academic All-Americans as determined by the College Sports Information Directors of America

- 1956: Al Viola (G)
- 1958: Andy Cvercko (T) & Gene Gossage (T)
- 1961: Larry Onesti (C)
- 1962: Paul Flatley (End)
- 1963: George Burman (T)
- 1970: Eric Hutchinson (DB) & Joe Zigulich (C)
- 1972: Mitch Anderson (QB)
- 1975: Randy Dean (QB)
- 1976: Randy Dean (QB)
- 1979: Kevin Berg (LB)
- 1980: Jim Ford (OT)
- 1986: Mike Baum (OT), Bob Dirkes (G), Todd Krehbiel (DB) & Brian Nuffer (RB)
- 1987: Mike Baum (OT)
- 1988: Mike Baum (OT)
- 1990: Ira Adler (K)
- 1995: Ryan Padgett (OL) & Sam Valenzisi (K)
- 1997: Barry Gardner (LB)
- 2002: Jason Wright (RB)
- 2003: Jason Wright (RB) & Jeff Backes (CB)
- 2004: Jeff Backes (CB) & Luis Castillo (DT)
- 2008: Phil Brunner (LS)
- 2009: Zeke Markshausen (WR) & Stefan Demos (K)

==== National Football Foundation ====
National Scholar-Athlete Award

- 1976: Randy Dean
- 1998: Barry Gardner
- 2012: Patrick Ward
- 2014: Brandon Vitabile
- 2017: Justin Jackson

== Notable alumni ==
=== NFL players ===
- Anthony Walker, Indianapolis Colts Linebacker
- Austin Carr, New Orleans Saints Wide Receiver
- Blake Hance, Free Agent Cleveland Browns Offensive Tackle
- Clayton Thorson, New York Giants Quarterback
- Corbin Bryant, Free agent Defensive Tackle
- Danny Vitale, New England Patriots Fullback
- Dean Lowry, Green Bay Packers Defensive End
- Earnest Brown IV, Free Agent Los Angeles Rams Defensive End
- Greg Newsome, Cleveland Browns Cornerback
- Godwin Igwebuike, Free Agent Atlanta Falcons Running Back
- Hunter Niswander, Free Agent Dallas Cowboys Punter
- Ibraheim Campbell, Dallas Cowboys Safety
- Ifeadi Odenigbo, New York Giants Defensive End
- Joe Gaziano, Free Agent Los Angeles Chargers Defensive End
- Joseph Jones, Free Agent Tampa Bay Buccaneers Linebacker
- Justin Jackson, Los Angeles Chargers Running Back
- Montre Hartage, Free Agent New York Giants Safety
- Nate Hall, Free Agent Houston Texans Line Backer
- Paddy Fisher, Free Agent Carolina Panthers Linebacker
- Peyton Ramsey, Free Agent Carolina Panthers Quarterback
- Rashawn Slater, Los Angeles Chargers Offensive Tackle
- Sherrick McManis, Chicago Bears Cornerback
- Trevor Siemian, New York Jets Quarterback
- Tyler Lancaster, Green Bay Packers Defensive Tackle
- Peter Skoronski, Tennessee Titans Offensive Tackle

=== Other alumni ===
- Mike Adamle, Chicago sports radio personality; former NFL running back
- Dick Alban, Defensive back
- Damien Anderson, NFL running back
- Doug Asad (Oakland Raiders)
- Darryl Ashmore, Offensive lineman
- Darnell Autry, former NFL Running back; former Heisman Trophy finalist
- Ralph Baker, halfback
- Cas Banaszek, (San Francisco 49ers)
- D'Wayne Bates, former NFL wide receiver
- Brett Basanez, quarterback
- Alf Bauman, Tackle
- Sean Bennett, Fullback
- Larry Benz (Cleveland Browns)
- Hank Bruder (Green Bay Packers)
- George Burman, Offensive Line
- Ron Burton, former New England Patriots Running back
- Woody Campbell, Houston Oilers AFL All-Star
- Bob Christian (Atlanta Falcons) Fullback
- Barry Cofield (New York Giants) NT
- Joe Collier, Former (Buffalo Bills) head coach
- Javiar Collins, tackle
- Steve Craig (Minnesota Vikings) Tight end
- Irv Cross (Philadelphia Eagles) Defensive back
- Andy Cvercko, Guard
- Casey Dailey, former New York Jets Linebacker
- Randy Dean, NFL quarterback, handball player at the 1976 Summer Olympics
- Robert Dean, handball player at the 1976 Summer Olympics
- Bill DeCorrevont,
- John L. "Paddy" Driscoll, football player and coach
- Curtis Duncan (Houston Oilers) Wide receiver
- Fate Echols, St. Louis Cardinals player
- Dick Fencl, NFL end
- Pat Fitzgerald, former Northwestern Wildcats football head coach
- Paul Flatley, Wide receiver
- Barry Gardner (Philadelphia Eagles) linebacker
- Brian Gowins, football player (Chicago Bears)
- Otto Graham, Cleveland Browns quarterback; member, NFL 75th Anniversary All-Time Team and Pro Football Hall of Fame
- Napoleon Harris
- Noah Herron, current Hartford Colonials running back
- Chris Hinton, 7-time NFL All-Pro offensive tackle
- Tom Homco, Linebacker
- Luke Johnsos (Chicago Bears)
- Mike Kerrigan, Former NFL and CFL Quarterback
- John Kidd, Punter
- Elbert Kimbrough
- Austin King, Center
- Kain Colter, a free agent
- Jim Lash, Wide receiver
- Chuck Logan
- Edgar Manske, 1933 All-American
- Tim McGarigle, (St. Louis Rams) Linebacker
- Al Moore (Chicago Bears)
- Ikechuku Ndukwe, offensive lineman
- Matt O'Dwyer, Offensive guard
- Ara Parseghian, legendary football coach of numerous programs, most notably Notre Dame; former NFL player
- Eric Peterman, Chicago Bears wide receiver
- Kyle Prater, wide receiver
- Ron Rector, running back
- Steve Reid, Guard, College Football Hall-of-Famer
- Pug Rentner, Halfback and Quarterback, 1931 All-American, 1932 Team MVP
- Jeff Roehl, offensive tackle
- Jack Rudnay, Kansas City Chiefs Pro Bowl center
- Pete Shaw, safety
- Sam Simmons, wide receiver (Miami Dolphins)
- Mike Stock, coach
- Zach Strief, New Orleans Saints offensive tackle
- Don Stonesifer (Chicago Cardinals)
- Steve Tasker (Buffalo Bills) wide receiver, seven-time NFL Pro Bowler, considered one of the great special teams players in NFL history
- Rob Taylor, offensive tackle
- Rick Telander, Chicago Sun-Times columnist
- Dick Thornton, former CFL quarterback
- Matt Ulrich, football player (Indianapolis Colts)
- Mike Varty, linebacker
- Rick Venturi, coach
- Norm Wells, Dallas Cowboys offensive lineman
- Ray Wietecha, center, former Green Bay Packers offensive coordinator
- Fred "The Hammer" Williamson, Former AFL All-Star
- Mike Witteck, linebacker
- Jason Wright, running back

== Media ==
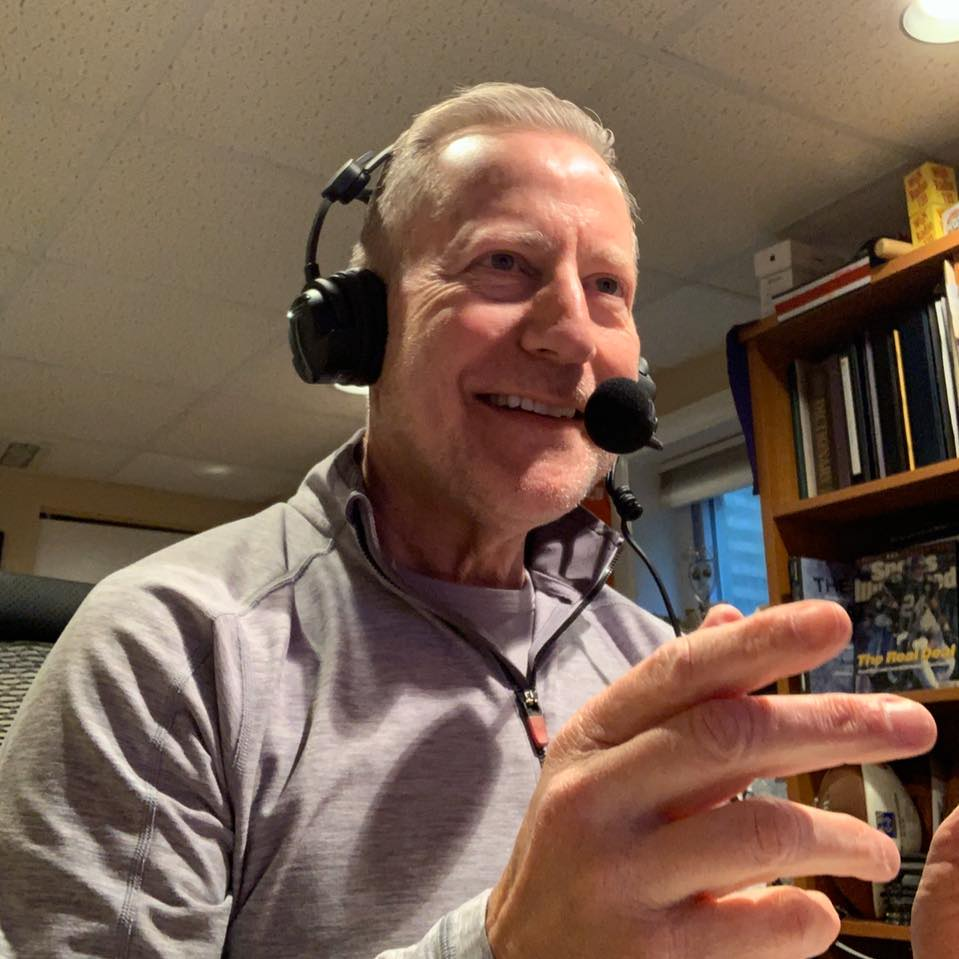
Dave Eanet on the mic.

Northwestern's student radio station, WNUR, broadcasts games with Northwestern students as announcers. Commercial broadcasts are handled by WGN (AM), with longtime Wildcat radio announcer Dave Eanet handling play-by-play and Ted Albrecht as color commentator.

== Future non-conference opponents ==
Announced schedules as of August 7, 2025.

| 2026 | 2027 | 2028 | 2029 | 2030 | 2031 |
|---|---|---|---|---|---|
| South Dakota State | Holy Cross | UCF | at Rice | Illinois State | Western Illinois |
| Colorado | at Colorado | | | | at UCF |
| Ball State | East Carolina | | | | Rice |
