= Willie the Wildcat =

Willie the Wildcat can refer to:

- Willie the Wildcat (Kansas State), the athletics mascot at Kansas State University in Manhattan, Kansas
- Willie the Wildcat (Northwestern), the athletics mascot at Northwestern University in Evanston and Chicago, Illinois
- Willie the Wildcat, the athletics mascot of Abilene Christian Wildcats
- Willie T. Wildcat, the mascot at Johnson & Wales University
- Wildcat Willie, the mascot of World Championship Wrestling, who was portrayed by Gary Hedrick
