= Chicago Athletic Association =

American football team

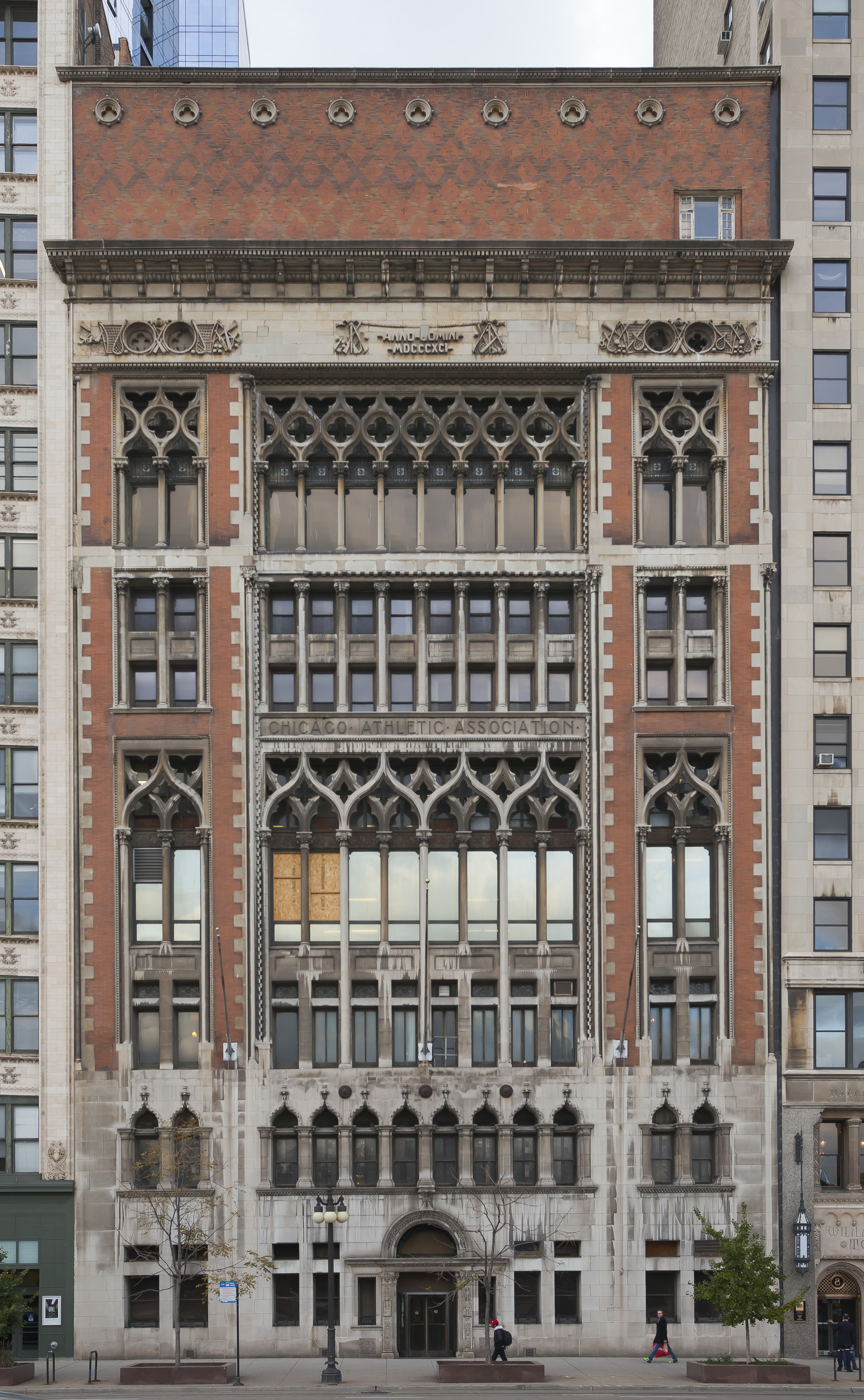
Chicago Athletic Association building, prior to its renovation.

The Chicago Athletic Association was a men's club formed in 1890 and American football team, based in Chicago, Illinois. Through their long history, the Chicago Athletic Association had a variety of sports teams that competed in track, swimming, water polo, baseball and gymnastics. A basketball team was also sponsored, and boxing and fencing demonstrations were common in the club's earlier days. Beginning in the 1890's their swimming and water polo teams were coached by John Robinson, a member of the Water Polo Hall of Fame, and the club had several members medal in the 1904 St. Louis Olympics. The club formed a football team in 1892 which played for seven seasons, and was built around veterans of Chicago's University Club football team.

The CAA's elaborate Venetian Gothic-style building on Michigan Avenue was designed by Henry Ives Cobb, with the façade mostly designed by his assistant, Louis Christian Mullgardt, in 1893. Its original logo was a red encircled letter C which was adopted by longtime club member William Wrigley Jr. for his Chicago Cubs in 1917.

Membership in the club was restricted to men until 1972, although wives or daughters could dine with a member. It was a private club from 1893 until it closed in 2007. The building was then turned into the Chicago Athletic Association Hotel in the next decade.

== History ==
The University Club football team was produced by the city, because Illinois and Northwestern were still years away from being competitive, and Amos Alonzo Stagg would not form the University of Chicago's program until 1892.

Chicago society therefore needed a team to represent the city in annual Thanksgiving Day games, and from 1888 to 1891 they created the University Club team and had it compete against either Michigan or Cornell each year. The University Club team was made up of recent college graduates, whose families were from Chicago but who were products of east coast football programs.

In 1892, the Chicago A. A. football team not only took over the primary football role of the University Club team, it built a program of playing a season-long schedule of university and club teams. That team included at least eight names from the 1891 University Club team, and added Yale halfback star Pudge Heffelfinger to the line-up. The 1893 team featured Heffelfinger, Yale, Laurie Bliss, and five players from the University Club.

In 1893 at the Chicago World's Fair, the Chicago A. A. played one of the first night football games against West Point (the earliest being on September 28, 1892, between Mansfield State Normal and Wyoming Seminary). Chicago won the game 14–0. The game lasted only 40 minutes, compared to the normal 90 minutes.

Although nominally amateur, the club was suspected of covertly compensating its football players with generous expense payments. Caspar Whitney of Harper's Weekly alleged more blatant professionalism, accusing the club of paying center Archibald Stevenson $600 to play the 1895 season.

The exterior of the Chicago Athletic Association building (1893) is based on the Doge's Palace in Venice.

== Notable players ==
In 1894, Jesse Van Doozer dropped out of Northwestern to play with the Chicago Athletic Association. Alvin Culver, who graduated that same year did the same. Knowlton Ames, a former All-American from Princeton, also played on the team in 1892. Sport Donnelly also played with the Chicago Athletic Association in 1892. In a game against the New York Crescents, the Crescents refused to take field unless Donnelly was barred from the Chicago lineup because of some alleged rough tactics he used the year before. Chicago benched Donnelly, and his absence resulted in a tie. Donnelly then became enraged and refused to rejoin the team in Chicago. Pudge Heffelfinger, who was also playing for Chicago, joined Donnelly in the walk-out. After this game he was once again recruited by the Allegheny Athletic Association, to play for them. A few weeks later, Donnelly and Heffelfinger were professional players with that team. However, by 1896, Donnelly was once again with Chicago as a coach.
