= Blake Hance =

American football player (born 1996)

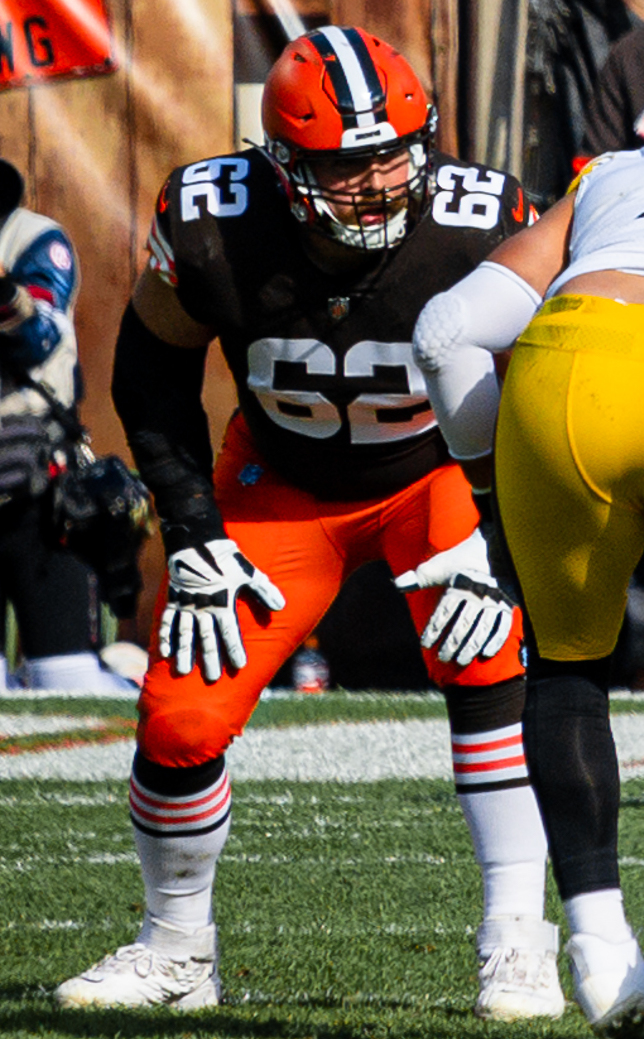
- Hance with the Cleveland Browns in 2021

No. 72 – Los Angeles Rams
- Position: Guard
- Roster status: Practice squad

Personal information
- Born: January 11, 1996 (age 30); Jacksonville, Illinois, U.S.
- Listed height: 6 ft 5 in (1.96 m)
- Listed weight: 310 lb (141 kg)

Career information
- High school: Jacksonville
- College: Northwestern (2014–2018)
- NFL draft: 2019: undrafted

Career history
- Buffalo Bills (2019)*; Washington Redskins (2019)*; Jacksonville Jaguars (2019–2020)*; New York Jets (2020)*; Cleveland Browns (2020–2021); San Francisco 49ers (2022); Jacksonville Jaguars (2022–2024); Tennessee Titans (2025); Los Angeles Rams (2026–present)*
- * Offseason or practice squad member only

Career NFL statistics as of 2024
- Games played: 59
- Games started: 10
- Stats at Pro Football Reference

Blake Andrew Hance (born January 11, 1996) is an American professional football guard for the Los Angeles Rams of the National Football League (NFL). He played college football for the Northwestern Wildcats.

== Professional career ==
Pre-draft measurables
Height	Weight	Arm length	Hand span	Wingspan	40-yard dash	10-yard split	20-yard split	20-yard shuttle	Three-cone drill	Vertical jump	Broad jump	Bench press
6 ft 5 5/8 in (1.97 m)	305 lb (138 kg)	32 1/8 in (0.82 m)	10 1/8 in (0.26 m)	6 ft 7 in (2.01 m)	5.29 s	1.85 s	3.01 s	4.69 s	7.65 s	27.0 in (0.69 m)	8 ft 11 in (2.72 m)	27 reps
All values from Pro Day

=== Buffalo Bills ===
After playing four years at Northwestern, Hance was signed by the Buffalo Bills as an undrafted free agent on May 9, 2019. However, he was soon released on May 22.

=== Washington Football Team ===
On June 3, 2019, Hance was signed by the Washington Football Team, where he spent the rest of training camp, being waived on August 31.

=== Jacksonville Jaguars ===
On September 1, 2019, Hance was signed by the Jacksonville Jaguars to their practice squad, where he spent the entire 2019 season. Afterward, he was signed to a reserve/futures contract on January 2, 2020, but was waived on September 5.

=== New York Jets ===
On September 22, 2020, Hance was signed by the New York Jets to their practice squad.

=== Cleveland Browns ===
On January 2, 2021, Hance was signed by the Cleveland Browns from the Jets' practice squad. Because of injuries and players inactive due to positive COVID-19 tests, he was activated for the Browns' playoff game against the Pittsburgh Steelers. He made his NFL debut in the fourth quarter, playing 14 snaps. Browns quarterback Baker Mayfield complimented Hance while noting they had not had a chance to practice together. "We had Michael Dunn step in at left guard for Joel Bitonio. And then, Michael got hurt and a guy named Blake, that I introduced myself to literally in the locker room before the game, stepped up in the fourth quarter."

The Browns placed an exclusive-rights free agent tender on Hance on March 7, 2022. Hance was waived by the Browns on August 30, as a part of final roster cuts.

=== San Francisco 49ers ===
On August 31, 2022, Hance was claimed off waivers by the San Francisco 49ers. He appeared in seven games with the 49ers, and was later waived on October 29.

=== Jacksonville Jaguars (second stint) ===
On November 1, 2022, Hance was claimed off waivers by the Jaguars.

On August 27, 2024, Hance was released by the Jaguars and re-signed to the practice squad. He was promoted to the active roster on October 29.

Hance appeared in 35 games during his three seasons with the Jaguars.

=== Tennessee Titans ===
On March 13, 2025, Hance signed with the Tennessee Titans on a one-year, $1.3 million contract.

=== Los Angeles Rams ===
On July 28, 2026, Hance signed with the Los Angeles Rams. On August 30, Hance was waived by Los Angeles as a part of final roster cuts; he was re-signed to the team's practice squad the following day.
