= Alvin H. Culver =

American football player and coach (1873–1955)

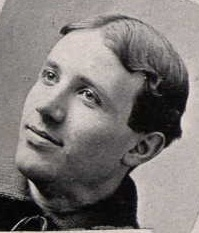
- Culver from The Ninety-Six Syllabus

Biographical details
- Born: March 9, 1873; Chicago, Illinois, U.S.
- Died: July 17, 1955 (aged 82); Cook County, Illinois, U.S.

Playing career
- 1892–1893: Chicago
- 1894: Chicago Athletic Association
- Position: Quarterback

Coaching career (HC unless noted)
- 1895–1896: Northwestern

Head coaching record
- Overall: 12–6–2

Alvin H. Culver (March 9, 1873 – July 17, 1955) was an American football player and coach. He served as the third head football coach at Northwestern University, coaching two seasons from 1895 to 1896 and compiling a record of 12–6–2. From 1892 to 1893, he also played college football, while attending the school. In 1894, he played for the Chicago Athletic Association alongside future Northwestern coach, Jesse Van Doozer, who had briefly dropped out of college to play one season with the team.

Culver's son, Al Culver, played in the National Football League.

== Head coaching record ==
Year	Team	Overall	Conference	Standing	Bowl/playoffs
Northwestern Purple (Independent) (1895)
1895	Northwestern	6–5			
Northwestern Purple (Western Conference) (1896)
1896	Northwestern	6–1–2	2–1–1	3rd	
Northwestern:		12–6–2	2–1–1		
Total:		12–6–2			
