= Northwestern University "Wildcat" Marching Band =

College marching band in Evanston, Illinois

- Nickname: "The Finest Band in the Land"
- School: Northwestern University
- Location: Evanston, Illinois
- Conference: Big Ten
- Founded: 1911
- Director: Michael Parker
- Members: 100
- Practice field: Floyd Long Field and Wilson Field at Ryan Fieldhouse
- Fight song: "Go U Northwestern"

Uniform
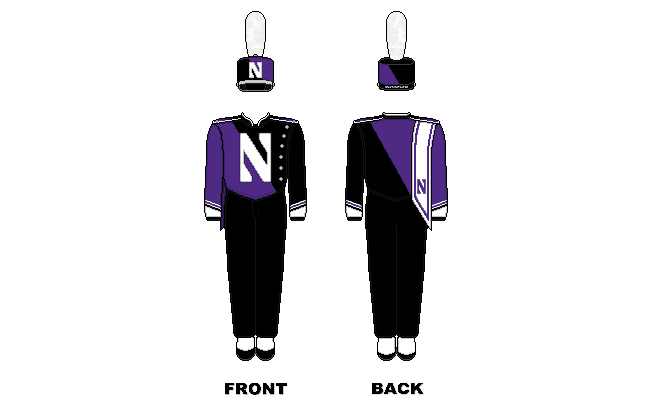
- Website: northwesternbands.org/numb

The Northwestern University Marching Band (NUMB), also known as the Wildcat Marching Band or simply the Wildcat Band, is the marching band at Northwestern University in Evanston, Illinois. The ensemble performs at all home football games and periodically makes appearances at events in the Chicago area. The band also performs at any postseason football games and one "away trip" per season, typically a Big Ten Conference game in the later half of the season.

== History ==
=== The Early Years (1911–1952) ===
In 1911, Northwestern's first University-sanctioned marching band was organized to play at football games. Under student leadership, their numbers varied before they were put under the supervision of the School of Music in 1926.

The band's first director, Glenn Cliffe Bainum, took the helm in 1926 and introduced diverse halftime drill formations. In the early 1940s, with Bainum serving in the military, Harold Finch took over as band director until 1945, when the band was disbanded due to lack of personnel. Bainum restarted the marching band program in 1947 and continued as director until 1950.

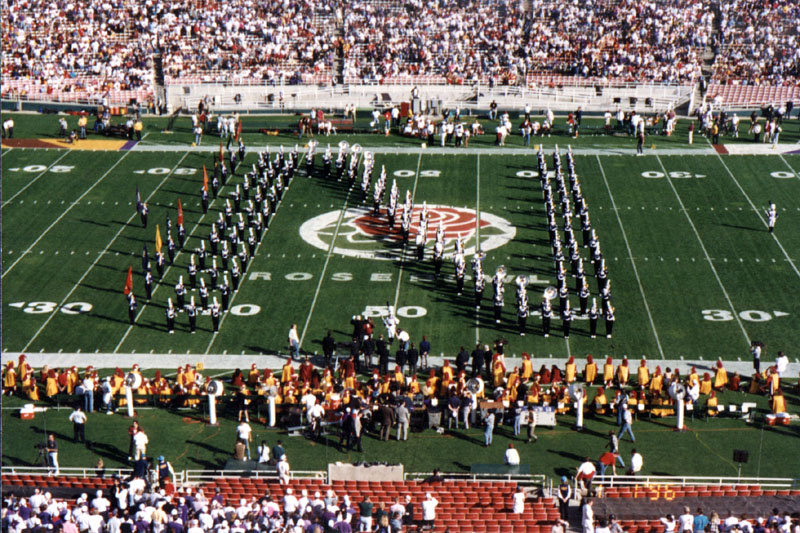
The Northwestern University "Wildcat" Marching Band performs the Alma Mater at the 1996 Rose Bowl under the direction of John P. Paynter.

=== The Paynter Years (1953–1995) ===
John Phillip Paynter became acting director of bands in 1950–1951 while working on his master's degree and became official director of bands in 1953. During the next forty-three years of his leadership, NUMB developed many of the traditions and culture it still has today. Among the accomplishments during his tenure were NUMB's incorporation of women in the 1970s, and the band's innovative use of drill charts to develop marching shows.

In 1970, James Sudduth became the first person (other than Paynter) to hold the title of marching band director. In the years that followed, several others held the position, including Cliff Colnot, William Hochkeppel, Donald Casey and Don Owens.

In 1981, Casey and Owens invited Pete Friedmann to succeed long-time announcer Jerry Lowe. Friedmann played clarinet in NUMB from 1975–78, and was NUMB Spirit Leader during his senior year. He continues in this role today and is the longest serving announcer in NUMB history.

In 1983, the position of the director of the marching band was shifted to the Athletic Department, and Dale Lonis became the first director of athletic bands. Under Lonis' leadership, the glide step was added to the halftime show style. The "N" formed during the band's pregame routine was slightly altered to match the new "sculpted N" logo which the university had adopted.

Stephen G. Peterson took over leadership of the band in 1987. During his tenure, the band was awarded the 1992 Sudler Trophy. In the 1995 NCAA football season, Northwestern's football team won the Big Ten Championship, earning themselves and NUMB a berth in the Rose Bowl for the first time since 1949. To mark the occasion, NUMB ordered new uniforms for the Rose Bowl game. Peterson and Paynter both accompanied the band to Southern California. NUMB played a halftime show consisting of popular opera compositions, including the Overture to William Tell, and Paynter led the band during its performances of the Northwestern Alma Mater. Paynter died on February 4, 1996, just more than a month after conducting the band at the Rose Bowl. His Northwestern life was bookended by the school's only two Rose Bowl appearances (he was an NU marching band member in 1949).

=== Recent history (1996–present) ===
In 1996, Mallory Thompson was hired to fill the Director of Bands position left vacant by Paynter's passing. That season the team went to the Florida Citrus Bowl, and NUMB featured the Northwestern Percussion Ensemble in its performance of Malagueña. Peterson parted ways with the university following the 1996 season and was replaced by Rodney Dorsey, who served through 1999. Daniel J. Farris was hired as Director of Athletic Bands in 2000.

Recent post-season appearances include: the Alamo Bowl (2000, 2008), the Motor City Bowl (2003), the Sun Bowl (2005), the Outback Bowl (2010, 2016), the Ticket City Bowl (2011), the Meineke Car Care Bowl of Texas (2011), the Gator Bowl (2013), the Pinstripe Bowl (2016), the Music City Bowl (2017), the Holiday Bowl (2018), the Las Vegas Bowl (2023) and the Big Ten Championship (2018).

A major milestone for the group in this period was when Northwestern Athletics began funding the band in 2011. Funding has allowed the band to operate on a larger budget, meaning that the band can report earlier for band camp and pays to stay in university housing during the weeks before Northwestern's fall quarter begins. The band was also able to purchase new uniforms in 2011.

NUMB's instrumentation includes brass and woodwind sections, a drum line, a color guard, one to three drum majors, and in some seasons, a feature twirler. The band is an all-volunteer ensemble with placement auditions only for the drum line, and students may receive academic credit for participation.

In 2022 the Northwestern University Libraries completed digitizing nearly 400 videos of the marching band's performances and other activities from the 1930s through the 1990s, as well as those of other ensembles, its largest audiovisual preservation project to date.

As of the end of the 2023-24 Northwestern academic year, Mallory Thompson retired as the Northwestern Director of Bands. In her place, Robert Taylor has stepped in as the Director of Bands. In September 2025 NUMB's director Daniel Farris announced his retirement after 26 seasons. Michael Parker, a doctoral conducting graduate from Michigan State University, was announced as his replacement.

== Pregame and Halftime Shows ==
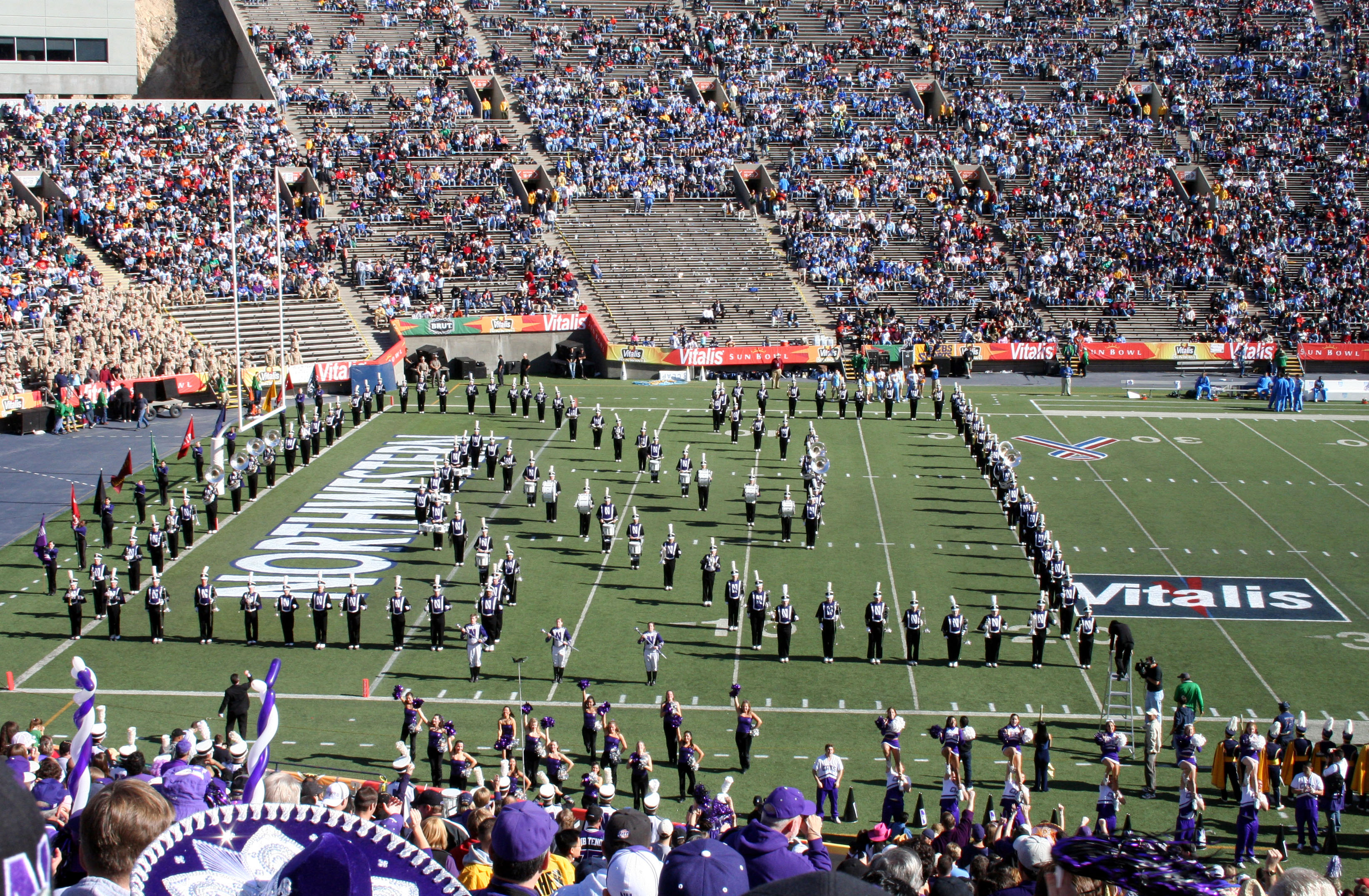
The Wildcat Marching Band forms the "Sculpted N" and performs "Go U Northwestern!" to close its pregame performance at the 2005 Sun Bowl.

NUMB's pregame show lasts around ten minutes and features the following musical works:

- "Fanfare"– a medley of the Northwestern spirit tunes performed as the drum majors enter the field from the tunnel
- "Downfield"
- "Push On", featuring the block "N" drill
- "Patriotic Medley", featuring American flag and star drill
- The visiting team's fight song
- "Go U Northwestern", featuring drill in the shape of the Northwestern Athletics "sculpted N" logo
- The US national anthem

The pregame show is performed using traditional chair-step marching only because Northwestern is in the Big Ten.

The band's halftime shows primarily use the glide step technique. The drill is written by the Director of Athletic Bands and graduate conducting students in the Bienen School of Music. Several different drills and musical selections are played during the season, with music generally including various rock, jazz, and pop selections.

== Traditions ==
=== March of the Steel Men ===
Charles Belsterling was an attorney and Vice President of U.S. Steel Corporation, which had a facility in Joliet, Illinois. Belsterling also was an amateur musician. Upon hearing that he was impressed by performances of the Joliet High School Band in 1936 in New York City, Belsterling was invited to provide a composition; band director Archie Raymond McAllister asked noted composer Harry L. Alford to arrange the tune into a march. Belsterling attended the march's 1937 premiere performance in Joliet and immediately renamed it "March of the Steel Men", which is now the nickname of the school's athletic teams.

Later, Glenn Cliffe Bainum adapted the music to match a drill called the "Old Plus-Four," which has been performed at the close of every home football season since 1928. The drill showcases the Northwestern monogram and a line of brass spanning the length of the football field.

=== Colors of the Big Ten ===
Since 1948, the "Wildcat" Band has been fronted by the colors of the Big Ten Conference universities. In 1975, purple and white flags were also added. The 2017 season marked the first time that the Wildcat Band fielded all of the Big Ten colors since the conference expanded to include fourteen member universities. The band had previously only fielded the Big Ten West flags, typically swapping in the opponent's colors if that opponent was in the Big Ten East.

=== Alma Mater ===
The band is known for its a cappella performance of the University Hymn (also known as the Alma Mater). Under the baton of the Director of Bands, new students and veteran members learn and practice the Alma Mater at each year. It is performed during halftime and post game and is sung in four-part harmony following the conclusion of the post-game performance. On certain occasions (such as the 1996 Rose Bowl and the 2005 Sun Bowl) the Alma Mater is performed during the pre-game show. The melody of the Alma Mater is based on the Chorale St. Antoni by Franz Josef Haydn (also heard in Johannes Brahms' Variations on a Theme by Haydn, Op. 56B). The text originally was sung entirely in Latin (written by J. Scott Clark), but in 1953 the music was arranged by John Paynter and new English lyrics were written by Thomas Tyra.

=== High School Band Day ===
Beginning in 1956, John Paynter began the tradition of inviting high school marching bands from the Chicago area to join NUMB on the field for halftime at one game each year. While Band Day was dropped from the schedule for several years in the 1990s, it returned in 2004 and continues to be a feature each year. At its peak there were nearly 10,000 high school musicians participating.

=== NUMBALUMS ===
NUMBALUMS are those band members who have graduated. The NUMBALUMS perform during Homecoming at the parade, alumni gatherings, and during the pre-game and halftime shows at the Homecoming football game. NUMBALUMS also perform at such other occasions as away games where the student Band does not make an official appearance, but where there are sufficient NUMBALUMS available to put together a Spirit Band to cheer on the football team.

The NUMBALUMS were organized by John Paynter in 1972, formally chartered as an organization in 1999, and officially recognized by the Northwestern Alumni Association in 2002. The NUMBALUMS are an active organization that not only provides opportunities for the Alums to get together and perform, but also has raised funds for the purchase of new uniforms and equipment for NUMB. There are currently roughly 2,000 members.

In April 2014, NUMBALUMS made public its efforts to establish the Northwestern Bands Push On Fund. The Endowment will be entirely donation-funded and used to improve the lives of Band members and the Band as a whole.

Notable NUMBALUMS include previous Northwestern Director of Bands, Mallory Thompson, and Broadway conductor, Ian Weinberger.

== The SpiriTeam ==
Founded in the 1960s, the "SpiriTeam" consists of two leaders of the band: the "Spirit Leader" and the "Grynder" (also known as "Grinder"). Working closely with the SpiriTeam is a third student, the "Geek". While traditions surrounding the SpiriTeam have evolved over time, reflecting the personalities of its members, their role remains to energize the band and student section in the stands throughout the game. The 2007 season marked the first all-female SpiriTeam.

=== The Spirit Leader ===
The Spirit Leader is in charge of leading the band, the students, and the home crowd in various cheers. By tradition, the Spirit Leader is elected by the band. The Spirit Leader's symbol of office is the Spirit Leader's Hat – a black aviator-style cloth helmet, which according to tradition belonged to a Northwestern football player who served in World War II.

=== The Grynder ===
The Grynder assists the Spirit Leader with cheers and keeping the band's spirit up during football games. While the Spirit Leader is elected, the Grynder position is passed down. During weekly Spirit Sessions, The Grynder performs an often loud and exclamatory work of slam poetry focused on the upcoming game. In the past the Grynder has been in charge of special cheers, including a traditional post-halftime extended cheer extolling the spirit of the band and its ability to growl loud enough to rattle the other team, wake the dead, and to be heard by the Grynder's mother no matter where on Earth (or Heaven) she is. The Grynder is said to possess a mutant gene, recognizable only to the previous Grynder, who selects their successor. The Grynder's symbol of office is the Grynder's Hat – a button-festooned black felt hat originally bought at the Wildcat's first Rose Bowl (1949) and handed down from Grynder to Grynder. The traditional goal of every Grynder is to take The Hat back to Pasadena and the Rose Bowl.

=== The Geek ===
The band chooses one member to be the official "Band Geek", whose purpose is to celebrate the traditional view of band members as band geeks. The Geek has three official duties, affirmed by oath: to be as loud and as obnoxious as possible, to assist the SpiriTeam™ when necessary, and to embody the spirit of band geeks everywhere; past, present and future. While the Spirit Leader and Grynder are primarily responsible for starting game day cheers, the Geek leads the band's traditional cheers, such as the "calculus chant".
