= Go U Northwestern =

Northwestern University fight song

The "Go U Northwestern", originally titled "Go Northwestern Go", is one of the fight songs of Northwestern University.

== History and significance ==
The song was written in 1912 by Theodore Van Etten, a member of the Northwestern University Wildcat Marching Band at the time. It debuted November 23, 1912, at old Northwestern Field in Northwestern's football season-finale versus the Illinois Fighting Illini.

The song, along with Northwestern's other fight song, "Rise, Northwestern!" (commonly called the "Push On Song" or simply "Push On!"), and the university's alma mater, "University Hymn" (sometimes "Quæcumque Sunt Vera") are Northwestern official school songs. "Go U Northwestern" or "Rise, Northwestern!" is played by the marching band during football games every time Northwestern scores against its opponent and at various other times during the game.

== Other uses ==
Along with being the Fight Song of Northwestern University, "Go U Northwestern" is the fight song for many high schools, with some using it under the original name. Several other colleges and universities use the song as well, including Northern Oklahoma College Enid and the University of North Carolina at Greensboro from 1998 to 2010.

High Schools Using "Go U Northwestern"
School	City
Ferndale High School	Ferndale, MI
Bettendorf High School	Bettendorf, IA
Hempstead High School	Dubuque, IA
Elkhart Central High School	Elkhart, IN
Southwestern Central High School	Jamestown West, NY
Cedar Ridge High School	Round Rock, TX
Perrysburg High School	Perrysburg, OH
Buchanan High School	Buchanan, MI
Ovid-Elsie High School	Elsie, MI
Owosso High School	Owosso, MI
Florence High School	Florence, WI
Waubonsie Valley High School	Aurora, IL
Rochester High School	Rochester, IL
Newton Falls High School	Newton Falls, OH
Edwardsburg High School	Edwardsburg, MI
Clover High School	Clover, SC
Central Montcalm High School	Stanton, MI
Northwestern High School	Hyattsville, MD
Cary-Grove High School	Cary, IL
Coronado School	El Paso, TX
Canyon High School	New Braunfels, TX
South Hardin Community School District	Eldora, IA
Bureau Valley High School	Manlius, IL
Putnam City West High School	Oklahoma City, OK
Portage High School	Portage, IN
Carlisle High School	Carlisle, PA
Shades Valley High School	Irondale, AL
Minnetonka High School	Minnetonka, MN
McCluer High School	Florissant, MO
Will Rogers High School	Tulsa, OK
Manzano High School	Albuquerque, NM
Centennial High School	Las Cruces, NM
Lutheran High School Westland	Westland, MI
Mid Prairie High School	Wellman, IA
Marfa High School	Marfa, TX
Alan C. Pope High School	Marietta, GA
Conestoga High School	Berwyn, PA
Turkey Valley High School	Jackson Junction, IA
Holland High School	Holland, MI
Martinsville High School	Martinsville, VA
Abbotsford High School	Abbotsford, WI
Black River Falls High School	Black River Falls, WI
Reedsburg Area High School	Reedsburg, WI
Northwestern High School	Maple, WI
Cactus High School	Glendale, AZ
Methodist Boys' School	Kuala Lumpur, Malaysia
Green High School	Franklin Furnace, OH
Southwestern High School (Piasa, Illinois)	Piasa, IL
Benedictine High School	Cleveland, OH
Rouse High School	Leander, TX
Cypress Woods High School	Cypress, TX
Sunrise Mountain High School	Peoria, AZ
Westwood High School	Blythewood, SC
Tom C. Clark High School	San Antonio, TX
Steele Canyon High School	Spring Valley, CA
Central High School	Tuscaloosa, AL

== In popular culture ==
In an early 1970s Sesame Street sketch, Ernie sings the song's opening bars while wearing a football helmet, eager to open a present Bert has wrapped, that Ernie thinks is a new football for him.
