= Alton Johnson =

American football player and coach

Biographical details
- Born: 1877; Chicago, Illinois, U.S.
- Died: Unknown

Playing career
- 1898–1902: Northwestern
- Position: Halfback

Coaching career (HC unless noted)
- 1908: Northwestern

Head coaching record
- Overall: 2–2

Alton Francis Johnson (born 1877, date of death unknown) was an American college football player and coach. He served as the head football coach at Northwestern University for one season, in 1908, compiling a record of 2–2. Johnson was born in Chicago.

== Head coaching record ==
Year	Team	Overall	Conference	Standing	Bowl/playoffs
Northwestern Purple (Western Conference) (1908)
1908	Northwestern	2–2	0–2	T–6th	
Northwestern:		2–2	0–2		
Total:		2–2			
