= Paul Noyes =

American football player and coach (1870–1946)

Biographical details
- Born: October 13, 1870; Evanston, Illinois, U.S.
- Died: September 6, 1946 (aged 75); Sharon, Connecticut, U.S.

Playing career
- 1888–1889: Northwestern
- 1892–1893: Northwestern

Coaching career (HC unless noted)
- 1893: Northwestern

Head coaching record
- Overall: 2–5–3

Marshall Paul Noyes (October 13, 1870 – September 6, 1946) was an American college football player and coach. He served as the first head football coach at Northwestern University, coaching one season in 1893 and compiling a record of 2–5–3.

== Head coaching record ==
| Year | Team | Overall | Conference | Standing | Bowl/playoffs |
|---|---|---|---|---|---|
Northwestern Purple (Intercollegiate Athletic Association of the Northwest) (1893)
| 1893 | Northwestern | 2–5–3 | 0–2 | 4th | |
| Northwestern: | | 2–5–3 | 0–2 | | |
| Total: | | 2–5–3 | | | |
