= A. A. Ewing =

American football player and coach

Playing career
- 1894: Chicago
- Position: Quarterback

Coaching career (HC unless noted)
- 1894: Northwestern

Head coaching record
- Overall: 4–5

A. A. Ewing was an American college football player and coach. He served as the second head football coach at Northwestern University, coaching one season in 1894 and compiling a record of 4–5. Ewing attended classes at the University of Chicago in 1894 while he was coach at Northwestern and also played for the Chicago Maroons football team that season.

== Head coaching record ==
Year	Team	Overall	Conference	Standing	Bowl/playoffs
Northwestern Purple (Independent) (1894)
1894	Northwestern	4–5			
Northwestern:		4–5			
Total:		4–5			
