= Willie the Wildcat (Northwestern) =

American university athletics mascot

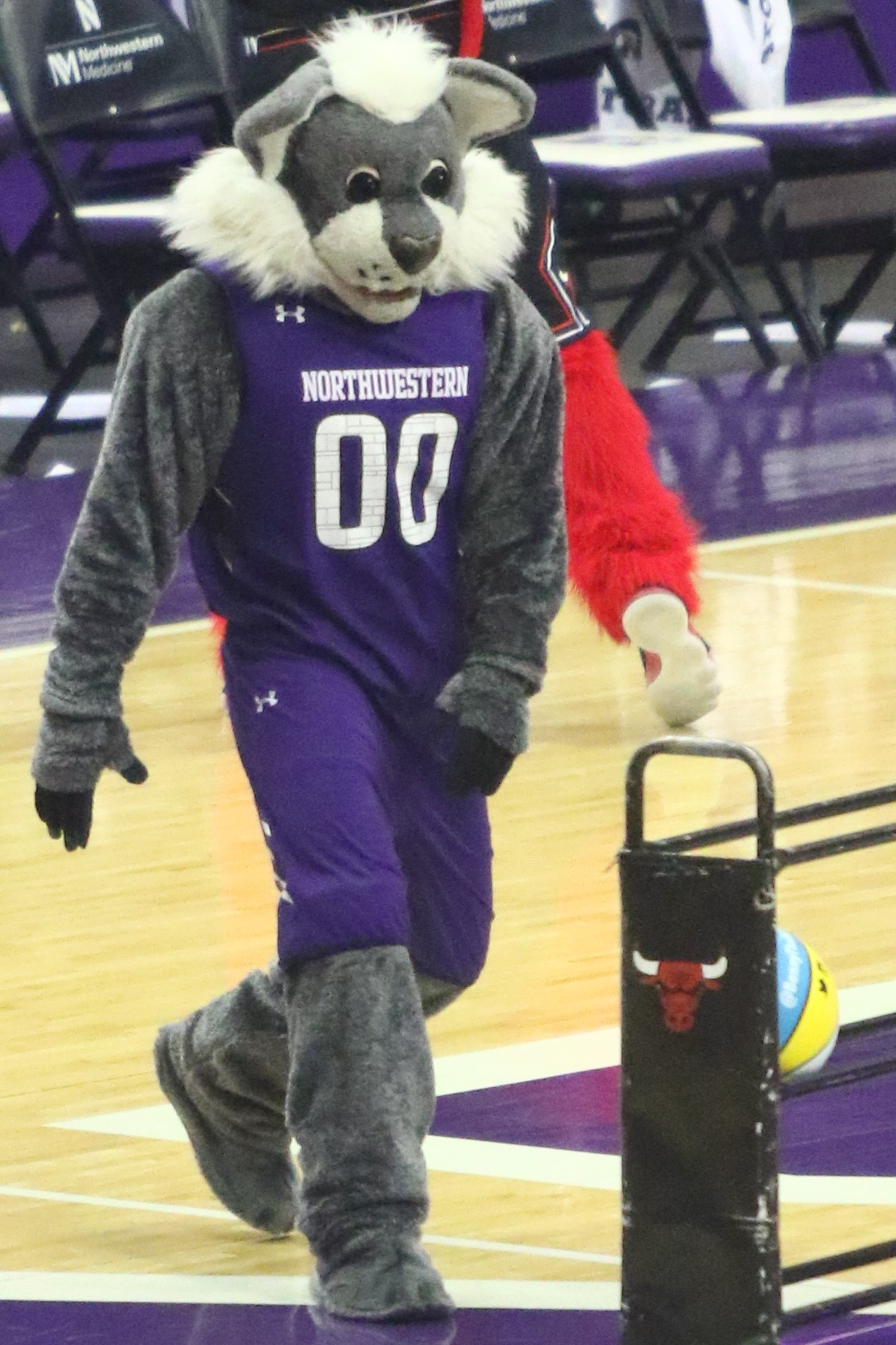
- Willie the Wildcat in 2018
- University: Northwestern University
- Conference: Big Ten
- Description: Anthropomorphic wildcat
- First seen: 1933

Willie the Wildcat is the mascot for the Northwestern Wildcats.

== History ==
Willie the Wildcat

c. 2007

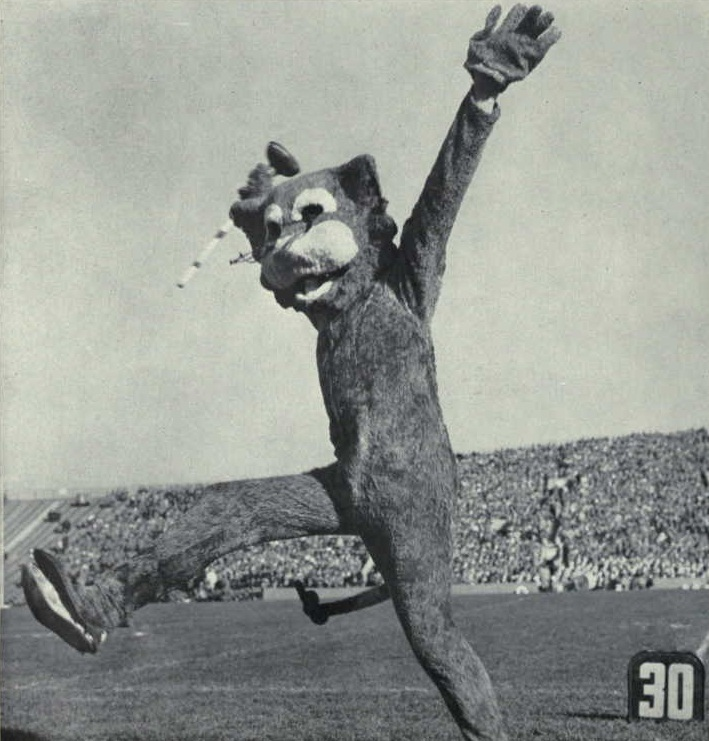
c. 1961

The name "Wildcats" was bestowed upon the university in 1924 by a writer for the Chicago Tribune who wrote that even in a loss to the University of Chicago Maroons, the Northwestern football players looked like "Wildcats [that] had come down from Evanston." The name was so popular that university board members made "Wildcats" the official nickname just months later.

In 1933, the Northwestern athletic department and an advertising firm created the first image of Willie. However, he did not come to life until 1947, when members of the Alpha Delta fraternity dressed up as him during the Homecoming parade.

In 2007, the first football game revealed a new-look Willie after a "makeover".

Evanston Township High School, the largest public high school in Evanston, has Willie the Wildkit as its mascot, in direct relation to Northwestern.
