= Jesse Van Doozer =

American football player and coach (1871–1929)

Biographical details
- Born: October 12, 1871; Osceola, Nebraska, U.S.
- Died: September 23, 1929 (aged 57); San Francisco, California, U.S.

Playing career
- 1892–1893: Northwestern
- 1894–1895: Chicago Athletic Association
- 1895–1896: Northwestern
- Position: Halback

Coaching career (HC unless noted)
- 1897: Northwestern

Head coaching record
- Overall: 5–3

Jesse Peck Van Doozer (October 12, 1871 – September 23, 1929) was an American football player and coach. He was the fourth head football coach at Northwestern University, serving for one season, in 1897, and compiling a record of 5–3. Van Doozer played college football for four seasons at Northwestern, between 1892 and 1896. In 1894, he dropped out of Northwestern to play one season with the Chicago Athletic Association (CAA). He also played left halfback in the CAA's Thanksgiving Day game against the Boston Athletic Association in 1895, after being recruited with Northwestern teammate Albert Potter by the CAA's athletic manager, Harry Cornish.

Van Doozer died on September 23, 1929, from peritonitis after an emergency surgery, at a hospital in San Francisco.

== Head coaching record ==
Year	Team	Overall	Conference	Standing	Bowl/playoffs
Northwestern Purple (Western Conference) (1897)
1897	Northwestern	5–3	0–2	6th	
Northwestern:		5–3	0–2		
Total:		5–3			
