= 2010 Outback Bowl =

- 24th Outback Bowl
Northwestern Wildcats	Auburn Tigers
(8–4)	(7–5)
Big Ten	SEC
35	38
Head coach: Pat Fitzgerald	Head coach: Gene Chizik
	1	2	3	4	OT	Total
Northwestern	7	0	14	14	0	35
Auburn	14	7	0	14	3	38
- Date: January 1, 2010
- Season: 2009
- Stadium: Raymond James Stadium
- Location: Tampa, Florida
- MVP: Darvin Adams (Auburn WR)
- Referee: Greg Burks (Big 12)
- Attendance: 49,383
- Payout: US$3,300,000

United States TV coverage
- Network: ESPN
- Announcers: Dave Pasch, Bob Griese, Chris Spielman and Rob Stone
- Nielsen ratings: 3.5

The 2010 Outback Bowl was a college football bowl game played at Raymond James Stadium in Tampa, Florida. The 24th edition of the Outback Bowl, it started at 11 a.m. EST on January 1, 2010. The game was telecast on ESPN and matched the Auburn Tigers against the Northwestern Wildcats. The game drew 5.69 million viewers (up 30% from the previous year), making it the 7th highest viewing on cable television for the week.

The game marked Auburn's third appearance in the Outback Bowl, and their first appearance since a 43–14 loss to Penn State in the 1996 edition. The game marked Northwestern's first appearance in the Outback Bowl, as the Wildcats sought their first postseason win since the 1949 Rose Bowl. This was the first-ever meeting between the two programs, and resulted in a 38–35 Auburn win. Darvin Adams, the MVP, had 12 receptions for 142 yards.

== Game summary ==
=== Scoring summary ===
==== First Quarter ====
Northwestern started out on offense. On their first drive, quarterback Mike Kafka threw his first interception when his pass bounced off of a Wildcat player and caught by a diving Walter McFadden. The Tigers drove 31 yards, ending with a Kodi Burns 1-yard touchdown rush, to get a 7-0 lead. On Northwestern's second drive, the 'Cats moved the football all the way to the Auburn 6-yard line. However, Kafka's pass into the endzone resulted in his second interception, once again to McFadden. McFadden ran the ball back 100 yards for a touchdown giving Auburn a 14-0 lead. NU was finally able to score on its third drive, with Kafka hooking up with Andrew Brewer for a 39-yard touchdown, making the score 14-7.

==== Second Quarter ====
The first drive of the second quarter resulted in Northwestern's Stefan Demos missing a 48-yard field goal. Later in the quarter, Auburn extended its lead to 21-7 when quarterback Chris Todd found Quindarius Carr for a 46-yard touchdown. With 1:55 left in the quarter, Northwestern got the ball at its own 6. The Wildcats were able to drive to Auburn's 4-yard line with 47 seconds left. But, Kafka threw his third interception of the game to T'Sharvan Bell in the endzone.

==== Third Quarter ====
On the first drive of the third quarter, Auburn wide receiver Kodi Burns threw his second interception of the game to Brian Peters. Later in the quarter, Kafka threw his fourth interception to Neiko Thorpe. But on NU's next drive, Kafka completed a 35 yard strike to Brewer for a touchdown to cut Auburn's lead to 21-14. The Tigers' following drive resulted in a punt giving NU the ball at its 34-yard line. Kafka found Drake Dunsmore for a 66-yard touchdown on the first play of the drive to tie the game at 21-21.

==== Fourth Quarter ====
Auburn's first drive of the quarter resulted in another punt. On the subsequent drive, Kafka threw his fifth interception of the game, second interception for Auburn's Bell. The short field resulted in a Ben Tate 5-yard TD rush, giving Auburn a 28-21 lead. Northwestern's following drive ended with a punt. Auburn's next drive ended again with Tate touchdown, this time of 7 yards, giving Auburn another 14-point lead. Tate dunked the ball over the field goal, resulting in a 15 yard unsportsmanlike conduct penalty on the kick-off. With the short field, Northwestern scored a touchdown on a Kafka 2-yard rush. However, Demos' extra point attempt was blocked, making the score 35-27. With 3:22 left in the game, Northwestern attempted an onside kick that was recovered by the Tigers. Tate fumbled on Auburn's second play of the drive and the Wildcats recovered at its 31-yard line. NU drove all the way to Auburns 33, but faced a 4th and 3 with 1:31 left. It looked as if Kafka was going to be sacked for a loss by Nick Fairley, essentially giving Auburn the win. However, Fairley was called for a 15 yard personal foul after getting a hold of Kafka's face mask. The 'Cats were given a first down on Auburn's 18. Kafka connected with Sidney Stewart for a touchdown, making the score 33-35. On NU's two-point attempt, Kafka tossed the ball to Brewer in what appeared to be a reverse. But, Brewer threw the ball to a wide open Brendan Mitchell, tying the game up and capping NU's second 14-point deficit comeback of the day. With 1:15 left in the game it appeared that Auburn would have a chance for a game-winning drive. But Demond Washington fumbled during the kick-off return giving the Wildcats the ball at the 50-yard line. Northwestern drove to Auburns 26-yard line. With 3 seconds left, Demos attempted a 43-yard field goal for the win, but missed wide right, sending the game into overtime. This was Demos' third miss of the game (2 FG and 1 blocked PAT).

==== Overtime ====
The overtime period alone turned the game into an instant classic. Northwestern won the toss and elected to play defense. Auburn reached the Northwestern 4-yard line, only to be stopped. Wes Byrum kicked a 21-yard field goal to give Auburn a 38-35 lead. On the fourth play of Northwestern's drive, Kafka was sacked for a 14-yard loss. Initially, he was ruled to have fumbled the ball causing the Auburn players celebrating and rushing the field. After further review, it was determined that Kafka was down. NU attempted a 37-yard field goal, which hit the right upright setting off another Auburn celebration. However, Demos was run into after the kick, resulting in a 10-yard penalty, giving the Wildcats a 1st and goal on the 9. The 'Cats were only able to reach the Auburn 5-yard line. Freshman kicker Steve Flaherty came in to try an 18-yard field goal due to Demos being injured on his previous attempt. With the Tigers still not ready, Northwestern ran their version of the fumblerooski, with Markshausen taking handoff between the legs from holder Dan Persa and rushing to the right. However, he was stopped short and hit out of bounds by Neiko Thorpe at the Auburn 2, sealing an Auburn victory.

Scoring Play	Score
1st Quarter
AU — Kodi Burns 1-yard rush (Wes Byrum kick), 12:25	AU 7-0
AU — Mike Kafka intercepted by Walter McFadden, returned for 100 yards (Wes Byrum kick), 4:37	AU 14-0
NU — Mike Kafka 39-yard pass to Andrew Brewer (Stefan Demos kick), 2:04	AU 14-7
2nd Quarter
AU — Chris Todd 46-yard pass to Quindarius Carr (Wes Byrum), 8:54	AU 21-7
3rd Quarter
NU — Mike Kafka 35-yard pass to Andrew Brewer (Stefan Demos kick), 2:42	AU 21-14
NU — Mike Kafka 66-yard pass to Drake Dunsmore (Stefan Demos kick), 0:27	TIE 21-21
4th Quarter
AU — Ben Tate 5-yard rush (Wes Byrum kick), 10:10	AU 28-21
AU — Ben Tate 12-yard rush (Wes Byrum kick), 7:32	AU 35-21
NU — Mike Kafka 2-yard rush (Stefan Demos kick Failed), 3:20	AU 35-27
NU — Mike Kafka 18-yard pass to Sidney Stewart (Andrew Brewer pass to Brendan Mitchell for 2-point conversion), 1:15	TIE 35-35
Overtime
AU — Wes Byrum 21-yard field goal	AU 38-35

== Statistics ==
=== Northwestern ===
- QB Mike Kafka: 47/78, 532 yds, 5 TD (4 pass, 1 rush), 5 Int
- WR Andrew Brewer: 8 rec, 133 yds, 2 TD
- WR Drake Dunsmore: 8 rec, 114 yds, 1 TD

Kafka set the all-time bowl record with 47 completions and 78 attempts. He set Northwestern and Outback Bowl records with 532 passing yards and an Outback Bowl record with 5 interceptions.

=== Auburn ===
- Chris Todd: 20/31, 235 yds, 1 TD
- Ben Tate: 20 rush, 108 yds, 2 TD
- Darvin Adams: 12 rec, 142 yds
- Walter McFadden: 2 Int, 100 yds, 1 TD
- T'Sharvan Bell: 2 Int
