= 2009 Auburn Tigers football team =

American college football season

2009 Auburn Tigers football

Outback Bowl champion

Outback Bowl, W 38–35 ^{OT} vs. Northwestern
- Conference: Southeastern Conference
- Western Division
- Record: 8–5 (3–5 SEC)
- Head coach: Gene Chizik (1st season)
- Offensive coordinator: Gus Malzahn (1st season)
- Offensive scheme: Spread
- Defensive coordinator: Ted Roof (1st season)
- Base defense: 4–3, Tampa 2
- Home stadium: Jordan–Hare Stadium

2009 Southeastern Conference football standings
	Conf.			Overall
Team	W		L	W		L
Eastern Division
No. 3 Florida x%	8	–	0	13	–	1
Georgia	4	–	4	8	–	5
Tennessee	4	–	4	7	–	6
Kentucky	3	–	5	7	–	6
South Carolina	3	–	5	7	–	6
Vanderbilt	0	–	8	2	–	10
Western Division
No. 1 Alabama x$#	8	–	0	14	–	0
No. 17 LSU	5	–	3	9	–	4
No. 20 Ole Miss	4	–	4	9	–	4
Arkansas	3	–	5	8	–	5
Auburn	3	–	5	8	–	5
Mississippi State	3	–	5	5	–	7
Championship: Alabama 32, Florida 13
# – BCS National Champion; $ – BCS representative as conference champion; % – BCS at-large representative; x – Division champion/co-champions; Rankings from AP Poll

The 2009 Auburn Tigers football team represented Auburn University during the 2009 NCAA Division I FBS football season. The Tigers were led by first year head coach Gene Chizik. Despite playing the 12th toughest schedule in the nation, the Tigers finished the season 8–5 (3–5 in SEC play) and won the Outback Bowl 38–35 in overtime against Northwestern.

While Auburn was unranked at the end of the season in both major polls, several BCS participating computer rating systems such as Sagarin (#22), Massey (#22), Peter Wolfe (#25), Howell (#24), David Wilson (#21), Team Rankings (#18) and the FACT Foundation (#21) included the Tigers in their final top 25 rankings.

The offense finished the season ranked 2nd in the SEC and 16th in the nation (with just under 432 yards per game), while the defense struggled with depth issues and finished 68th and 2nd worst in the SEC. The pass efficiency defense however was 3rd best in the SEC and ranked 22nd in the nation.

== Coaching change ==
On December 3, 2008, Auburn University announced that 10-year head coach Tommy Tuberville would not return for an eleventh season. The coaching search ended less than two weeks later when Auburn announced Iowa State's second-year head coach and former Auburn defensive coordinator Gene Chizik as the Tigers' next head coach. Auburn had interviewed at least eight coaches, including Buffalo's Turner Gill and TCU's Gary Patterson.

== Schedule ==
Auburn's schedule consisted of eight Southeastern Conference opponents (four home, four away) and four non-conference opponents. Auburn opened the season against Louisiana Tech. It was the twelfth matchup between the schools and the first meeting since 2004. The Tigers also hosted Mid-American Conference opponent Ball State for the third time. Also, Football Championship Subdivision foe Furman visited for the first time since 1956. Auburn began conference play in the second week, hosting Mississippi State. The following week, the Tigers hosted West Virginia, the second game in a home-and-home series between the two teams. The Tigers had previously faced all twelve regular season opponents, with Auburn holding the all-time series lead going into the season against all but Alabama (33–39–1), LSU (19–23–1), and West Virginia (0–1).

Date	Time	Opponent	Rank	Site	TV	Result	Attendance
September 5	6:00 pm	Louisiana Tech*		Jordan–Hare Stadium; Auburn, AL	ESPNU	W 37–13	81,143
September 12	6:00 pm	Mississippi State		Jordan–Hare Stadium; Auburn, AL	SECRN	W 49–24	85,269
September 19	6:45 pm	West Virginia*		Jordan–Hare Stadium; Auburn, AL	ESPN2	W 41–30	87,451
September 26	6:00 pm	Ball State*		Jordan–Hare Stadium; Auburn, AL	SECRN	W 54–30	83,118
October 3	6:45 pm	at Tennessee		Neyland Stadium; Knoxville, TN (rivalry)	ESPN	W 26–22	102,941
October 10	11:00 am	at Arkansas	No. 17	Donald W. Reynolds Razorback Stadium; Fayetteville, AR	ESPN	L 23–44	72,559
October 17	6:30 pm	Kentucky		Jordan–Hare Stadium; Auburn, AL	ESPNU	L 14–21	86,217
October 24	6:30 pm	at No. 9 LSU		Tiger Stadium; Baton Rouge, LA (Tiger Bowl)	ESPN2	L 10–31	92,654
October 31	11:21 am	No. 25 Ole Miss		Jordan–Hare Stadium; Auburn, AL (rivalry)	SECN	W 33–20	84,756
November 7	12:30 pm	(FCS) Furman*^{†}		Jordan–Hare Stadium; Auburn, AL	PPV	W 63–31	81,506
November 14	6:00 pm	at Georgia		Sanford Stadium; Athens, GA (Deep South's Oldest Rivalry)	ESPN2	L 24–31	92,746
November 27	1:30 pm	No. 2 Alabama		Jordan–Hare Stadium; Auburn, AL (Iron Bowl)	CBS	L 21–26	87,451
January 1	10:00 am	vs. Northwestern*		Raymond James Stadium; Tampa, FL (Outback Bowl)	ESPN	W 38–35 ^{OT}	49,383
*Non-conference game; ^{†}Homecoming; Rankings from AP Poll; All times are in Central time

== Rankings ==
Ranking movements Legend: ██ Increase in ranking ██ Decrease in ranking — = Not ranked
	Week															
Poll	Pre	1	2	3	4	5	6	7	8	9	10	11	12	13	14	Final
AP	—	—	—	—	—	17	—	—	—	—	—	—	—	—	—	—
Coaches	—	—	—	—	—	19	—	—	—	—	25	—	—	—	—	—
Harris	Not released				—	19	—	—	—	—	—	—	—	—	—	Not released
BCS	Not released							—	—	—	—	—	—	—	—	Not released

== Game summaries ==
=== Louisiana Tech ===
Team	1	2	3	4	Total
Louisiana Tech	7	3	3	0	13
• Auburn	10	3	10	14	37

- Date: September 5
- Location: Jordan–Hare Stadium, Auburn, AL
- Game start: 6:06 p.m. CST
- Elapsed time: 3:19
- Game attendance: 81,143
- Game weather: 84°, Partly Cloudy
- Referee: Steve Shaw
- TV announcers (ESPNU): Eric Collins (play-by-play), Brock Huard (color), Beth Mowins (sidelines)
- Source: Louisiana Tech vs. Auburn - College Football Box Score - September 5, 2009

Scoring summary
1	9:24	AUB	Wes Byrum 25-yard field goal	AUB 3-0
1	5:00	LT	Dennis Morris 19-yard pass from Ross Jenkins (Matt Nelson kick)	LT 7-3
1	1:33	AUB	Kodi Burns 1-yard run (Wes Byrum kick)	AUB 10-7
2	0:23	LT	Matt Nelson 20-yard field goal	TIE 10-10
2	0:00	AUB	Wes Byrum 49-yard field goal	AUB 13-10
3	10:59	AUB	Terrell Zachary 93-yard pass from Chris Todd (Wes Byrum kick)	AUB 20-10
3	4:28	AUB	Wes Byrum 47-yard field goal	AUB 23-10
3	0:52	LT	Matt Nelson 46-yard field goal	AUB 23-13
4	12:45	AUB	Darvin Adams 17-yard pass from Chris Todd (Wes Byrum kick)	AUB 30-13
4	5:27	AUB	Onterio McCalebb 3-yard run (Wes Byrum kick)	AUB 37-13

=== Mississippi State ===
Team	1	2	3	4	Total
Mississippi State	0	17	0	7	24
• Auburn	14	14	14	7	49

- Date: September 12
- Location: Jordan–Hare Stadium, Auburn, AL
- Game start: 6:07 p.m. CST
- Elapsed time: 3:25
- Game attendance: 85,269
- Game weather: 79°, Mostly Cloudy
- Referee: Ken Williamson
- TV announcers (SECRN): Bob Rathbun (play-by-play), David Archer (color), Jenn Hildreth (sidelines)
- Source: Mississippi State vs. Auburn - College Football Box Score - September 12, 2009

Scoring summary
1	8:13	AUB	Kodi Burns 1-yard run (Wes Byrum kick)	AUB 7-0
1	2:21	AUB	Antonio Coleman 20-yard interception return (Wes Byrum kick)	AUB 14-0
2	12:05	MSST	Anthony Dixon 1-yard run (Sean Brauchle kick)	AUB 14-7
2	7:20	MSST	Sean Brauchle 29-yard field goal	AUB 14-10
2	4:44	MSST	Robert Elliott 10-yard blocked punt return (Sean Brauchle kick)	MSST 17-14
2	3:08	AUB	Onterio McCalebb 48-yard run (Wes Byrum kick)	AUB 21-17
2	0:16	AUB	Kodi Burns 1-yard run (Wes Byrum kick)	AUB 28-17
3	3:52	AUB	Philip Lutzenkirchen 13-yard pass from Kodi Burns (Wes Byrum kick)	AUB 35-17
3	1:19	AUB	Ben Tate 35-yard run (Wes Byrum kick)	AUB 42-17
4	11:15	MSST	Christian Ducre 1-yard pass from Tyson Lee (Sean Brauchle kick)	AUB 42-24
4	5:56	AUB	Kodi Burns 1-yard run (Wes Byrum kick)	AUB 49-24

=== West Virginia ===
Team	1	2	3	4	Total
West Virginia	21	0	9	0	30
• Auburn	10	10	7	14	41

- Date: September 19
- Location: Jordan–Hare Stadium, Auburn, AL
- Game start: 7:50 p.m. CST
- Elapsed time: 3:31
- Game attendance: 87,451
- Game weather: 71°, Light Rain
- Referee: Dennis Hannigan
- TV announcers (ESPN2): Mark Jones (play-by-play), Bob Davie (color)
- Source: West Virginia vs. Auburn - College Football Game Recap - September 19, 2009

Scoring summary
1	12:52	WV	Noel Devine 1-yard run (Tyler Bitancurt kick)	WV 7-0
1	10:19	WV	Noel Devine 71-yard run (Tyler Bitancurt kick)	WV 14-0
1	7:24	AUB	Wes Byrum 46-yard field goal	WV 14-3
1	5:16	AUB	Darvin Adams 16-yard pass from Chris Todd (Wes Byrum kick)	WV 14-10
1	2:01	WV	Jock Sanders 6-yard pass from Jarrett Brown (Tyler Bitancurt kick)	WV 21-10
2	9:15	AUB	Wes Byrum 45-yard field goal	WV 21-13
2	1:34	AUB	Darvin Adams 4-yard pass from Chris Todd (Wes Byrum kick)	WV 21-20
3	8:51	WV	Noel Devine 12-yard run (kick failed)	WV 28-20
3	8:02	AUB	Mario Fannin 82-yard pass from Chris Todd (Wes Byrum kick)	WV 28-27
3	1:07	WV	Tyler Bitancurt 28-yard field goal	WV 30-27
4	12:07	AUB	Darvin Adams 17-yard pass from Chris Todd (Wes Byrum kick)	AUB 34-30
4	3:41	AUB	Craig Stevens 15-yard interception return (Wes Byrum kick)	AUB 41-30

=== Ball State ===
Team	1	2	3	4	Total
Ball State	7	3	7	13	30
• Auburn	7	26	14	7	54

- Date: September 26
- Location: Jordan–Hare Stadium, Auburn, AL
- Game start: 6:30 p.m. CST
- Elapsed time: 3:19
- Game attendance: 83,118
- Game weather: 73°, Mostly Cloudy
- Referee: Ken Williamson
- TV announcers (SECRN): Bob Rathbun (play-by-play), David Archer (color), Jenn Hildreth (sidelines)
- Source: Ball State vs. Auburn - College Football Box Score - September 26, 2009

Scoring summary
1	12:26	BALL	MiQuale Lewis 2-yard run (Ian McGarvey kick)	BALL 7-0
1	2:53	AUB	Tommy Trott 6-yard pass from Chris Todd (Wes Byrum kick)	TIE 7-7
2	13:47	AUB	Terrell Zachary 46-yard pass from Chris Todd (Wes Byrum kick)	AUB 14-7
2	12:53	AUB	Josh Bynes safety	AUB 16-7
2	12:20	AUB	Onterio McCalebb 1-yard run (Wes Byrum kick)	AUB 23-7
2	8:22	AUB	Terrell Zachary 65-yard pass from Chris Todd (Wes Byrum kick)	AUB 30-7
2	2:35	BALL	Ian McGarvey 33-yard field goal	AUB 30-10
2	0:07	AUB	Wes Byrum 32-yard field goal	AUB 33-10
3	11:39	AUB	Darvin Adams 26-yard pass from Chris Todd (Wes Byrum kick)	AUB 40-10
3	8:50	BALL	Kelly Page 21-yard run (Ian McGarvey kick)	AUB 40-17
3	7:09	AUB	Mario Fannin 36-yard pass from Chris Todd (Wes Byrum kick)	AUB 47-17
4	12:39	BALL	Zane Fakes 1-yard pass from Kelly Page (Ian McGarvey kick)	AUB 47-24
4	10:14	BALL	Ian McGarvey 37-yard field goal	AUB 47-27
4	7:19	AUB	Neil Caudle 52-yard run (Wes Byrum kick)	AUB 54-27
4	2:21	BALL	Ian McGarvey 33-yard field goal	AUB 54-30

=== Tennessee ===
Team	1	2	3	4	Total
• Auburn	6	7	3	10	26
Tennessee	0	6	0	16	22

- Date: October 3
- Location: Neyland Stadium, Knoxville, TN
- Game start: 6:47 p.m. CST
- Elapsed time: 3:38
- Game attendance: 102,941
- Game weather: 65°, Clear
- Referee: Tom Ritter
- TV announcers (ESPN): Brad Nessler (play-by-play), Todd Blackledge (color), Erin Andrews (sidelines)
- Source: Auburn vs. Tennessee - College Football Game Recap - October 3, 2009

Scoring summary
1	5:01	AUB	Wes Byrum 29-yard field goal	AUB 3-0
1	3:36	AUB	Wes Byrum 43-yard field goal	AUB 6-0
2	8:07	AUB	Ben Tate 11-yard run (Wes Byrum kick)	AUB 13-0
2	0:28	TEN	Montario Hardesty 1-yard run (kick blocked)	AUB 13-6
3	9:34	AUB	Wes Byrum 19-yard field goal	AUB 16-6
4	13:41	AUB	Terrell Zachary 11-yard pass from Chris Todd (Wes Byrum kick)	AUB 23-6
4	11:36	TEN	Montario Hardesty 31-yard pass from Jonathan Crompton (Daniel Lincoln kick)	AUB 23-13
4	4:19	TEN	Daniel Lincoln 26-yard field goal	AUB 23-16
4	0:39	AUB	Wes Byrum 22-yard field goal	AUB 26-16
4	0:00	TEN	Denarius Moore 32-yard pass from Jonathan Crompton (no kick)	AUB 26-22

=== Arkansas ===
Team	1	2	3	4	Total
#17 Auburn	0	3	20	0	23
• Arkansas	6	21	7	10	44

- Date: October 10
- Location: Donald W. Reynolds Razorback Stadium, Fayetteville, AR
- Game start: 11:02 a.m. CST
- Elapsed time: 3:22
- Game attendance: 72,559
- Game weather: 45°, Overcast
- Referee: Matt Austin
- TV announcers (ESPN): Dave Pasch (play-by-play), Bob Griese and Chris Spielman (color)
- Source: Auburn vs. Arkansas - College Football Box Score - October 10, 2009

Scoring summary
1	8:02	ARK	Brodrick Green 2-yard run (TEAM kick failed)	ARK 6-0
2	11:49	ARK	Michael Smith 25-yard run (Alex Tejada kick)	ARK 13-0
2	11:02	ARK	Greg Childs 16-yard pass from Ryan Mallett (Alex Tejada kick)	ARK 20-0
2	8:54	AUB	Wes Byrum 37-yard field goal	ARK 20-3
2	1:08	ARK	D.J. Williams 5-yard pass from Ryan Mallett (Alex Tejada kick)	ARK 27-3
3	7:56	ARK	Ryan Mallett 4-yard run (Alex Tejada kick)	ARK 34-3
3	5:14	AUB	Ben Tate 1-yard run (Wes Byrum kick)	ARK 34-10
3	3:52	AUB	Ben Tate 60-yard run (Chris Todd pass failed)	ARK 34-16
3	0:09	AUB	Onterio McCalebb 3-yard run (Wes Byrum kick)	ARK 34-23
4	11:22	ARK	Broderick Green 3-yard run (Alex Tejada kick)	ARK 41-23
4	4:20	ARK	Alex Tejada 23-yard field goal	ARK 44-23

=== Kentucky ===
Team	1	2	3	4	Total
• Kentucky	0	7	0	14	21
Auburn	7	7	0	0	14

- Date: October 17
- Location: Jordan–Hare Stadium, Auburn, AL
- Game start: 6:35 p.m. CST
- Elapsed time: 3:24
- Game attendance: 86,217
- Game weather: 48°, Cloudy
- Referee: Tom Ritter
- TV announcers (ESPNU): Eric Collins (play-by-play), Brock Huard (color)
- Sources: Kentucky vs. Auburn - College Football Box Score - October 17, 2009

Scoring summary
1	7:25	AUB	Neiko Thorpe 69-yard blocked field goal return (Wes Byrum kick)	AUB 7-0
2	9:02	UK	Morgan Newton 4-yard run (Lones Seiber kick)	TIE 7-7
2	0:06	AUB	Ben Tate 1-yard run (Wes Byrum kick)	AUB 14-7
4	6:29	UK	Will Fidler 2-yard run (Lones Seiber kick)	TIE 14-14
4	3:17	UK	Randall Cobb 4-yard run (Lones Seiber kick)	UK 21-14

=== LSU ===
Tiger Bowl

Team	1	2	3	4	Total
Auburn	0	0	3	7	10
• #9 LSU	14	3	14	0	31

- Date: October 24
- Location: Tiger Stadium, Baton Rouge, LA
- Game start: 6:34 p.m. CST
- Elapsed time: 3:21
- Game attendance: 92,654
- Game weather: 64°, 42% Humidity
- Referee: Hubert Owens
- TV announcers (ESPN2): Mark Jones (play-by-play), Bob Davie (color)
- Sources: Auburn vs. LSU - College Football Box Score - October 24, 2009

Scoring summary
1	8:21	LSU	Terrance Toliver 14-yard pass from Jordan Jefferson (Josh Jasper kick)	LSU 7-0
1	1:10	LSU	Jordan Jefferson 15-yard run (Josh Jasper kick)	LSU 14-0
2	0:09	LSU	Josh Jasper 32-yard field goal	LSU 17-0
3	13:41	LSU	Brandon LaFell 17-yard pass from Jordan Jefferson (Josh Jasper kick)	LSU 24-0
3	9:21	AUB	Wes Byrum 24-yard field goal	LSU 24-3
3	1:09	LSU	Russell Shepard 69-yard run (Josh Jasper kick)	LSU 31-3
4	0:03	AUB	Philip Lutzenkirchen 1-yard pass from Neil Cautle (Wes Byrum kick)	LSU 31-10

=== Ole Miss ===
Team	1	2	3	4	Total
#24 Ole Miss	7	0	13	0	20
• Auburn	3	7	23	0	33

- Date: October 31
- Location: Jordan–Hare Stadium, Auburn, AL
- Game start: 11:21 a.m. CST
- Elapsed time: 3:35
- Game attendance: 84,756
- Game weather: 57°, Cloudy
- Referee: Penn Wagers
- TV announcers (SEC Network): Dave Neal (play-by-play), Andre Ware (color), Cara Capuano (sidelines)
- Sources: Ole Miss vs. Auburn - College Football Box Score - October 31, 2009

Scoring summary
1	10:31	MISS	Andy Hartmann 7-yard pass from Jevan Snead (Joshua Shene kick)	MISS 7-0
1	8:06	AUB	Wes Byrum 36-yard field goal	MISS 7-3
2	5:23	AUB	Darvin Adams 28-yard pass from Chris Todd (Wes Byrum kick)	AUB 10-7
3	11:37	AUB	Tommy Trott 14-yard pass from Kodi Burns (Wes Byrum kick)	AUB 17-7
3	11:25	AUB	Walter McFadden 29-yard interception return (Wes Byrum kick)	AUB 24-7
3	7:42	AUB	Ben Tate 53-yard run (Wes Byrum kick)	AUB 31-7
3	7:28	MISS	Jesse Grandy 82-yard kickoff return (Joshua Shene kick)	AUB 31-14
3	6:04	MISS	Dexter McCluster 79-yard run (Joshua Shene kick blocked)	AUB 31-20
3	6:04	AUB	Demond Washington PAT return	AUB 33-20

=== Furman ===
2009 Homecoming Game

Team	1	2	3	4	Total
Furman	3	0	14	14	31
• Auburn	21	21	7	14	63

- Date: November 7
- Location: Jordan–Hare Stadium, Auburn, AL
- Game start: 12:35 p.m. CST
- Elapsed time: 2:54
- Game attendance: 81,506
- Game weather: 68°, Sunny
- Referee: Hubert Owens
- TV announcers (PPV): Andy Burcham (play-by-play), Cole Cubelic (color), Melissa Lee (sidelines)
- Sources: Furman vs. Auburn - College Football Box Score - November 7, 2009

Scoring summary
1	13:03	AUB	Darvin Adams 6-yard pass from Chris Todd (Wes Byrum kick)	AUB 7-0
1	7:00	FUR	Matthew Cesari 23-yard field goal	AUB 7-3
1	4:08	AUB	Ben Tate 9-yard run (Wes Byrum kick)	AUB 14-3
1	1:10	AUB	Mario Fannin 24-yard pass from Chris Todd (Wes Byrum kick)	AUB 21-3
2	12:03	AUB	Darvin Adams 23-yard pass from Chris Todd (Wes Byrum kick)	AUB 28-3
2	7:53	AUB	Darvin Adams 41-yard pass from Chris Todd (Wes Byrum kick)	AUB 35-3
2	0:41	AUB	Ben Tate 5-yard run (Wes Byrum kick)	AUB 42-3
3	12:51	FUR	Jerodis Williams 6-yard run (Matthew Cesari kick)	AUB 42-10
3	10:33	FUR	Tersoo Uhaa 19-yard run (Matthew Cesari kick)	AUB 42-17
3	1:18	AUB	Eric Smith 2-yard run (Wes Byrum kick)	AUB 49-17
4	9:50	AUB	Anthony Gulley 13-yard run (Wes Byrum kick)	AUB 56-17
4	6:33	FUR	Jerodis Williams 1-yard run (Matthew Cesari kick)	AUB 56-24
4	5:03	AUB	Anthony Gulley 50-yard run (Wes Byrum kick)	AUB 63-24
4	0:21	FUR	R.J. Webb 17-yard pass from Chris Forcier (Matthew Cesari kick)	AUB 63-31

=== Georgia ===
Deep South's Oldest Rivalry

Team	1	2	3	4	Total
Auburn	14	0	3	7	24
• Georgia	0	7	10	14	31

- Date: November 14
- Location: Sanford Stadium, Athens, GA
- Game start: 6:06 p.m. CST
- Elapsed time: 3:27
- Game attendance: 92,746
- Game weather: 65°, Clear
- Referee: Matt Austin
- TV announcers (ESPN2): Mark Jones (play-by-play), Bob Davie (color)
- Sources: Auburn vs. Georgia - College Football Box Score - November 14, 2009

Scoring summary
1	11:13	AUB	Kodi Burns 5-yard pass from Chris Todd (Wes Byrum kick)	AUB 7-0
1	3:15	AUB	Terrell Zachary 31-yard pass from Chris Todd (Wes Byrum kick)	AUB 14-0
2	13:14	UGA	Israel Troupe 50-yard pass from Joe Cox (Blair Walsh kick)	AUB 14-7
3	11:05	UGA	Blair Walsh 51-yard field goal	AUB 14-10
3	4:51	UGA	Washaun Ealey 1-yard run (Blair Walsh kick)	UGA 17-14
3	2:08	AUB	Wes Byrum 37-yard field goal	TIE 17-17
4	14:25	UGA	Caleb King 11-yard run (Blair Walsh kick)	UGA 24-17
4	14:11	AUB	Demond Washington 99-yard kickoff return (Wes Byrum kick)	TIE 24-24
4	6:52	UGA	Caleb King 24-yard run (Blair Walsh kick)	UGA 31-24

=== Alabama ===
Iron Bowl

Team	1	2	3	4	Total
• #2 Alabama	0	14	6	6	26
Auburn	14	0	7	0	21

- Date: November 27
- Location: Jordan–Hare Stadium, Auburn, AL
- Game start: 1:40 p.m. CST
- Elapsed time: 3:19
- Game attendance: 87,451
- Game weather: 57°, Sunny
- Referee: Penn Wagers
- TV announcers (CBS): Craig Bolerjack (play-by-play), Steve Beuerlein (color)
- Sources: Alabama vs. Auburn - College Football Box Score - November 27, 2009

Scoring summary
1	11:40	AUB	Terrell Zachary 67-yard run (Wes Byrum kick)	AUB 7-0
1	5:42	AUB	Eric Smith 1-yard pass from Chris Todd (Wes Byrum kick)	AUB 14-0
2	13:26	ALA	Trent Richardson 2-yard run (Leigh Tiffin kick)	AUB 14-7
2	5:31	ALA	Colin Peek 33-yard pass from Greg McElroy (Leigh Tiffin kick)	TIE 14-14
3	11:05	AUB	Darvin Adams 72-yard pass from Chris Todd (Wes Byrum kick)	AUB 21-14
3	5:32	ALA	Leigh Tiffin 27-yard field goal	AUB 21-17
3	0:24	ALA	Leigh Tiffin 31-yard field goal	AUB 21-20
4	1:24	ALA	Roy Upchurch 4-yard pass from Greg McElroy (2-point pass conversion failed)	ALA 26-21

=== Northwestern ===
2010 Outback Bowl

Team	1	2	3	4	OT	Total
Northwestern	7	0	14	14	0	35
• Auburn	14	7	0	14	3	38

- Date: January 1, 2010
- Location: Raymond James Stadium, Tampa, FL
- Game start: 10:02 a.m. CST
- Elapsed time: 4:05
- Game attendance: 49,383
- Game weather: 63°, Cloudy
- Referee: Greg Burks
- TV announcers (ESPN): Dave Pasch (play-by-play), Bob Griese and Chris Spielman (color), Rob Stone (sidelines)
- Sources: Northwestern vs. Auburn - College Football Box Score - January 1, 2010

Scoring summary
1	12:25	AUB	Kodi Burns 1-yard run (Wes Byrum kick)	AUB 7-0
1	4:37	AUB	Walter McFadden 100-yard interception return (Wes Byrum kick)	AUB 14-0
1	2:04	NW	Andrew Brewer 39-yard pass from Mike Kafka (Stefan Demos kick)	AUB 14-7
2	8:54	AUB	Quindarius Carr 46-yard pass from Chris Todd (Wes Byrum kick)	AUB 21-7
3	2:42	NW	Andrew Brewer 35-yard pass from Mike Kafka (Stefan Demos kick)	AUB 21-14
3	0:27	NW	Drake Dunsmore 66-yard pass from Mike Kafka (Stefan Demos kick)	TIE 21-21
4	10:10	AUB	Ben Tate 5-yard run (Wes Byrum kick)	AUB 28-21
4	7:32	AUB	Ben Tate 7-yard run (Wes Byrum kick)	AUB 35-21
4	3:20	NW	Mike Kafka 2-yard run (PAT blocked)	AUB 35-27
4	1:15	NW	Sidney Stewart 18-yard pass from Mike Kafka (2-Point Conversion)	TIE 35-35
OT	0:00	AUB	Wes Byrum 21-yard field goal	AUB 38-35

== Personnel ==
=== Coaching staff ===
Name	Position	Alma mater	Year entering
Gene Chizik	Head coach	Florida	1st
Gus Malzahn	Offensive coordinator/quarterbacks	Henderson State	1st
Ted Roof	Defensive coordinator/linebackers	Georgia Tech	1st
Trooper Taylor	Assistant head coach/wide receivers	Baylor	1st
Curtis Luper	Running backs/recruiting coordinator	Stephen F. Austin	1st
Jeff Grimes	Offensive line	UTEP	1st
Jay Boulware	Special teams coordinator/Tight ends	Texas	1st
Phillip Lolley	Cornerbacks	Livingston	1st
Tommy Thigpen	Safeties	North Carolina	1st
Tracy Rocker	Defensive line	Auburn	1st
Kevin Yoxall	Head Strength and Conditioning Coach	TCU	10th

=== Depth chart ===
Starters and backups.

Defense

FS
Daren Bates
Demond Washington
Drew Cole

WLB	MLB	SLB
⋅	Eltoro Freeman	⋅
Adam Herring	Spencer Pybus	⋅
⋅	⋅	⋅

SS
Zac Etheridge
Mike Slade
⋅

CB
Walt McFadden
T'Sharvan Bell
⋅

DE	DT	DT	DE
Antonio Coleman	Jake Ricks	Mike Blanc	Michael Goggans
Cameron Henderson	Derrick Lykes	Zach Clayton	Antoine Carter
⋅	⋅	⋅	Jomarcus Savage

CB
Neiko Thorpe
D'Antoine Hood
⋅

Offense

WR
Anthony Durso
Montez Billings
John Cubelic

WR
Tim Hawthorne
Quindarius Carr
Philip Pierre-Louis

LT	LG	C	RG	RT
Lee Ziemba	Byron Isom	Ryan Pugh	Mike Berry	Andrew McCain
A.J. Green	Bart Eddins	Mike Berry	Jared Cooper	Vance Smith
⋅	⋅	Bart Eddins	Rudy Odom	⋅

WR
Mario Fannin
Tommy Trott
Gabe McKenzie

WR
Darvin Adams
Derek Winter
Harry Adams

QB
Chris Todd
Kodi Burns
Neil Caudle

RB
Ben Tate
Onterio McCalebb
Eric Smith

Special teams
PK Wes Byrum
PK Chandler Brooks
P Clinton Durst
P Ryan Shoemaker
KR Mario Fannin
PR Mario Fannin
LS Clayton Tooker
