= Mike Kafka =

American football player and coach (born 1987)

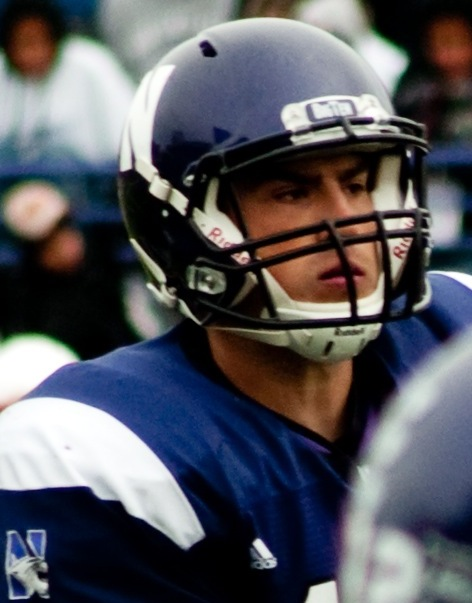
- Kafka with the Northwestern Wildcats in 2009

Detroit Lions
- Title: Passing game coordinator

Personal information
- Born: July 25, 1987 (age 39); Chicago, Illinois, U.S.
- Listed height: 6 ft 3 in (1.91 m)
- Listed weight: 230 lb (104 kg)

Career information
- Position: Quarterback (No. 3)
- High school: St. Rita (Chicago)
- College: Northwestern (2005–2009)
- NFL draft: 2010: 4th round, 122nd overall pick

Career history

Playing
- Philadelphia Eagles (2010–2011); New England Patriots (2013)*; Jacksonville Jaguars (2013)*; Tampa Bay Buccaneers (2014); Minnesota Vikings (2015); Tennessee Titans (2015)*; Cincinnati Bengals (2015)*
- * Offseason or practice squad member only

Coaching
- Northwestern (2016) Graduate assistant; Kansas City Chiefs (2017–2021); Offensive quality control (2017); Quarterbacks coach (2018–2019); Quarterbacks coach & passing game coordinator (2020–2021); New York Giants (2022–2025); Offensive coordinator (2022–2023); Assistant head coach & offensive coordinator (2024–2025); Interim head coach (2025); Detroit Lions (2026–present) Passing game coordinator

Awards and highlights
- As a player: Second-team All-Big Ten (2009); As a coach: Super Bowl champion (LIV)

Career NFL statistics
- Passing attempts: 16
- Passing completions: 11
- Completion percentage: 68.8%
- Passing yards: 107
- TD–INT: 0–2
- Passer rating: 47.7
- Stats at Pro Football Reference

Head coaching record
- Regular season: 2–5 (.286)
- Coaching profile at Pro Football Reference

Michael John Kafka (born July 25, 1987) is an American professional football coach and former quarterback who is the passing game coordinator for the Detroit Lions of the National Football League (NFL). After attending St. Rita of Cascia High School in Chicago, Illinois, he played college football for the Northwestern Wildcats, receiving second-team All-Big Ten Conference honors as a senior. He was drafted by the Philadelphia Eagles in the fourth round of the 2010 NFL draft, and spent six seasons in the NFL as a journeyman quarterback. Kafka became the quarterbacks coach for the Kansas City Chiefs in 2018, and Patrick Mahomes, the starting quarterback for the Chiefs, earned the NFL Most Valuable Player award that season. Kafka helped the team win Super Bowl LIV the following season. He was the New York Giants' interim head coach in 2025.

Despite being the backup quarterback in 2008 for Northwestern, Kafka finished second on the team in rushing yards with 321. Following C. J. Bachér's graduation, Kafka became the starter for 2009. Against Syracuse, he set the school record for most consecutive pass completions with 16. In the same game, he became the first Big Ten Conference player to score a passing, receiving, and rushing touchdown since Zack Mills from Penn State in 2004. He was named Big Ten Co-Offensive Player of the Week for his performance. In the 2010 Outback Bowl against Auburn, Kafka set the all-time bowl record with 47 completions and 78 passing attempts. He set Northwestern and Outback Bowl records with 532 passing yards and an Outback Bowl record with five interceptions.

Kafka spent two seasons as a member of the Eagles. In 2010, he was the third-string quarterback behind Michael Vick and Kevin Kolb but did not see playing time. He was mainly the third-string quarterback again in 2011 behind Vick and Vince Young, but saw some playing time in two games early in the season, both of which resulted in losses. He was expected to be the backup quarterback behind Vick in 2012 but a broken hand caused him to miss time in the preseason and was ultimately released in favor of rookie Nick Foles and veteran Trent Edwards. Kafka spent time on offseason rosters with the New England Patriots and Jacksonville Jaguars in 2013, on the Tampa Bay Buccaneers' practice squad in 2014, on the preseason roster with the Minnesota Vikings in 2015, and on the practice squad for the Tennessee Titans and Cincinnati Bengals in 2015.

Kafka became a graduate assistant with the Northwestern football team in 2016, and was hired by the Chiefs as an offensive quality control coach in 2017. He was promoted to quarterbacks coach in 2018, and helped the team win the Super Bowl during the 2019 season, his first as a player or coach. He was given an additional title of passing game coordinator in 2020. After the 2021 season, he joined the New York Giants as their offensive coordinator. He added the title of assistant head coach with the Giants in 2024, and became the team's interim head coach in 2025. He joined the Lions as the team's passing game coordinator in 2026.

== Early life ==
Kafka was born on July 25, 1987, in Chicago, Illinois, to Michael and Sandra Kafka. He attended St. Rita of Cascia High School in Chicago, where he played football and baseball. He was the team captain for both teams. In football, he led the Mustangs to three conference championships and had a career record of 35–8. He played safety as a freshman, but moved to quarterback during his sophomore year. The next season, he also played wide receiver. As a senior in 2004, Kafka completed 75-of-129 passes. In the season-opener against Homewood-Flossmoor High School, Kafka went up against H-F's quarterback Freddie Barnes and won the game, 52–28. Against Mt. Carmel High School, he ran for 164 yards and passed for 126 yards. Kafka passed for 1,004 yards and 10 touchdowns in 2004. He ran for 806 yards with a 5.6 yards per carry average, and five touchdowns on 144 carries. His career stats at St. Rita were 1,816 total offensive yards and 16 touchdowns.

Kafka made the school's Silver Honor Roll all four years of high school and was an Academic All-State. He was an All-area selection by Tom Lemming's Prep Football Report and was an honorable mention all-state selection. SuperPrep named him All-Midwest Region and Rivals.com placed him on the Top 25 dual-threat quarterbacks list. SuperPrep ranked him 25th among players from Illinois at all positions and 50th nationally among quarterbacks. He was ranked 20th in Illinois by Rivals.com and 25th nationally among dual-threat quarterbacks. Kafka was named Team Offensive MVP and Catholic Metro Blue Offensive MVP. He was an honorable mention all-area honoree by Chicago Sun-Times and Daily Southtown.

College recruiting
Name	Hometown	School	Height	Weight	40^{‡}	Commit date
Mike Kafka; QB	Chicago, Illinois	St. Rita of Cascia High School	6 ft 3 in (1.91 m)	185 lb (84 kg)	4.70	Dec 10, 2004
Mike Kafka; QB	Recruit ratings: Scout: Rivals:					
Overall recruit ranking: Scout: 51 (QB) Rivals: 25 (QB), 20 (IL)
‡ Refers to 40-yard dash; Note: In many cases, Scout, Rivals, 247Sports, On3, and ESPN may conflict in their listings of height, weight and 40 time.; In these cases, the average was taken. ESPN grades are on a 100-point scale.; Sources: "Northwestern College Football Recruiting Commits". Scout.; "Scout.com Team Recruiting Rankings". Scout.; "2005 Team Ranking". Rivals.com.

Kafka committed to Northwestern University on December 10, 2004. He also received offers from Florida Atlantic University, the University of Pittsburgh and Stanford University.

== College career ==
=== 2005–2007 ===
During the 2005 season, his first year, Kafka redshirted in order for him to learn the Northwestern Wildcats' offensive system.

In his Northwestern career debut on September 1, 2006, against Miami University, Kafka threw for 106 yards and one touchdown on 13 completions out of 17 attempts. His first touchdown was a 19-yard pass to running back Tyrell Sutton. He led all players with 89 yards rushing on 17 rushing attempts. His passer rating for that game was 148.26 as Northwestern went on to win 21–3. The following week against New Hampshire on September 9, Kafka went 19–32 and threw for 173 yards along with one interception and a fumble. He rushed for 42 yards. The Wildcats ended up losing the game, 34–17. Kafka played the first half of the game against Eastern Michigan in the third week of the season and rushed for 33 yards with a 6.6 yards per run average, along with his first career rushing touchdown, a six-yard run. He passed for 76 yards and completed 10 out of 18 passes with an interception.

Days before Northwestern faced Nevada in the fourth game of the season, head coach Pat Fitzgerald confirmed that Kafka would remain the starter despite his poor prior performances. In the game, Kafka ran for a career-high 111 yards, which included a 13-yard touchdown rush, and averaged 9.2 yards per run. He passed for 122 yards, completing 9 out of 21 passes and three interceptions. His 111 yards rushing were the most by a Northwestern quarterback since Zak Kustok ran for 111 yards in a November 21, 2001, game versus Bowling Green. Kafka suffered a hamstring injury during the game, which kept him out of the next three games of the season. One of the games he missed was the biggest comeback in NCAA Division I-A history, an eventual 41–38 loss to Michigan State on October 21. Kafka made his first appearance since the injury against Ohio State on November 11, in which he passed for 17 yards and completed four out of eight passes.

In 2007, Kafka was a backup and only played in two games, in which he passed for 11 yards on two completions and rushed for eight yards.

=== 2008 season ===
Kafka entered the 2008 season as a backup quarterback behind C. J. Bachér. Against Syracuse, Kafka entered the game in the fourth quarter and rushed twice for 18 yards. Against Southern Illinois, he threw two passes, completing one for one yard, in addition to rushing for three yards. He played in the final series at Indiana and completed a pass, which went for nine yards.

Starting in place of the injured Bachér for the game against Minnesota, Kafka ran for 217 yards on 27 attempts, which included a 53-yard run, and passed for 143 yards and two touchdowns on 12 completions out of 16 throws. His 217 rushing yards set a school and Big Ten Conference record for quarterback rushing yards in a game. The Big Ten record was later beaten in 2010 by Michigan quarterback Denard Robinson on September 11, 2010. Kafka began the game by completing his first eight throws, which included a 36-yard touchdown pass to Jeremy Ebert. He was named the team's offensive player of the week after that game, along with being named the Big Ten Co-Offensive Player of the Week. Kafka earned an ESPN College Gameday Helmet Sticker and was named an AT&T All-America Player of the Week candidate.

The next week, Kafka started in his second straight game against Ohio State, and passed for 177 yards while completing 18-of-27 throws. He ran for 83 yards and a touchdown on 29 attempts. He ran for 300 yards in his two starts against Ohio State, which is the most by a Northwestern quarterback in successive contests. He was named the team's offensive big playmaker for the game.

Against Michigan, he entered the game in Northwestern's second series on offense and rushed for 20 yards on three carries before he was forced to leave the game after suffering a concussion. He ran for one yard on three carries against Illinois.

Kafka passed for 330 yards during the season along with two touchdowns on 32 completions and 46 total attempts. He finished second on the team in rushing with 321 yards.

=== 2009 season ===
Kafka entered his senior season as Northwestern's starting quarterback after C. J. Bachér graduated. He was named to the Johnny Unitas Golden Arm Award watch list, along with 19 other players nationally, with two others in the Big Ten Conference. Texas quarterback Colt McCoy eventually won the award. In the offseason, Kafka was tutored by offensive coordinator Mick McCall and former Northwestern quarterback Brett Basanez. Kafka was named co-captain for the 2009 season.

At home against Towson on September 5 to start the 2009 season, Kafka threw 15-of-20 attempts for 192 yards, setting a career-high for passing yards in a game. He ran for six yards on six carries in a blowout 47–14 win. Against Eastern Michigan at home on September 12, he threw for 158 yards and one interception on 14 completions out of 24 attempts. He ran for 21 yards on five runs in the close 27–24 win over the Eagles.

During the Syracuse game, Kafka set a school record for consecutive completions in a game with 16, breaking a record set by Tom Myers in 1962. He set a new career-high in passing yards in a game by passing for 390 yards, breaking his previous career-high in the season opener. Kafka also ran for a three-yard touchdown and threw three touchdown passes along with an interception. He caught a receiving touchdown when he tossed a lateral to Andrew Brewer who threw it back to Kafka for a 24-yard touchdown. Kafka became the first Big Ten Conference player to score at least one passing, receiving and rushing touchdown in a game since Zack Mills from Penn State accomplished it on September 4, 2004, against Akron. Kafka finished the game with 35 completions on 42 attempts. However, despite his record-breaking performance, the Wildcats lost 37–34. He was named Big Ten Co-Offensive Player of the Week on September 20 for his performance.

Kafka passed for 309 yards, two touchdowns and an interception against Minnesota. He took four sacks and during a desperation drive to win the game, fumbled the football, which helped end the game and give the Golden Gophers the win. In the Purdue game, Kafka went 28-of-44 and threw for 224 yards. He rushed for a season-high 39 yards on 18 carries and ran for the game-winning two-yard touchdown. After leading after the touchdown 25–21, Kafka threw a successful two-point conversion pass to Drake Dunsmore to increase the lead by six to win the game after Purdue failed to score on the final drive of the game.

Kafka went 15 completions of 31 attempts for 191 yards and one interception to lead Northwestern to a 16–6 win over Miami (OH) in the sixth game of the season. He was the leading rusher for Northwestern, rushing for 53 yards on 15 carries and two touchdowns. In the 24–14 loss at Michigan State on October 17, Kafka went 34-for-47 and threw for 291 yards and two touchdowns. He was the leading rusher for the second straight week for Northwestern, rushing for 42 yards on 18 carries.

In a win against Indiana, the Wildcats trailed 28–3 during the second quarter before Kafka ran for a one-yard touchdown and later passed for two touchdowns to lead Northwestern to a 29–28 win. The Wildcats overcame a 25-point deficit, which was the biggest comeback in school history. He went 26-of-46 and passed for 312 yards, along with two touchdowns and a career-tying three interceptions. He rushed for 65 yards on 17 carries and one touchdown. Kafka totaled 377 yards of total offense, which was second-best in his career. Against 12th ranked Penn State, Kafka went 14-for-18 and passed for 128 yards, along with rushing for 42 yards on eight carries and a touchdown before leaving the game with a leg injury during the second quarter. He was replaced by backup Dan Persa.

Kafka shared time at quarterback with Persa due to his strained hamstring on November 7 against the 4th-ranked, and previously undefeated, Iowa Hawkeyes. Northwestern coming into the game was a 16-point underdog, but still beat Iowa 17–10 in Northwestern's first win over a nationally ranked top-ten team since they won against Ohio State in 2004. Persa had to leave the game early to receive X-rays for a hand injury, which forced Kafka to play more than original planned. He finished as Northwestern's leading passer with 72 yards on ten completions.

Against Illinois on November 14, Kafka threw for 305 yards and went 23-of-37, along with a 28-yard touchdown pass to wide receiver Zeke Markshausen. He rushed seven times for 12 yards and a one-yard touchdown to beat the Fighting Illini 21–16. Kafka threw for 300 or more yards for the fourth time that season. Against 16th-ranked Wisconsin on November 21, Kafka went 26-of-40 for 326 yards and two touchdowns, both to converted wide receiver Andrew Brewer. He rushed for 17 yards on seven carries to upset the Badgers with a 33–31 win. Kafka threw for 300 or more yards for the fifth time in the season and for the second straight game. He was named Big Ten Co-Offensive Player of the Week for his performance against Wisconsin.

"I don't think there is any player in this conference that means more to his football team than Mike Kafka. To me, that's what an MVP is. Obviously, there are a lot of great players in this league, a lot of talent in this league, but at the end of the day, I think Mike Kafka is not only our MVP, but an All-Big Ten quarterback and the MVP of the conference."

— Pat Fitzgerald

Kafka ranked third in the Big Ten Conference in passing yards with 241.5 passing yards per game and he ranked second in total offense. He finished the season tied for first in the Big Ten in rushing touchdowns by a quarterback with seven. His 65.7 completion percentage for 2009 ranked first in the Big Ten. His 414 pass attempts ranked third in the Big Ten and eighth among all quarterbacks nationally.

Kafka was named second-team All-Big Ten following the 2009 season. He was named first-team All-Big Ten by Rivals.com. He finished fourth in the Chicago Tribune's Silver Football voting, given out to the Big Ten's Most Valuable Player, behind Brandon Graham, Daryll Clark and John Clay. Hall of Fame quarterback Bob Griese said Kafka "has the three qualities I look for. One, he's a good decision-maker, he knows when to throw the ball away. Two, he's accurate. Three, he makes plays. This is where Kafka really jumps out. If he has a playmaker downfield, he gets the ball to him." Kafka graduated from Northwestern in December.

In the 2010 Outback Bowl against Auburn on January 1, Kafka set the all-time bowl record with 47 completions and 78 passing attempts. He set Northwestern and Outback Bowl records with 532 passing yards, a career-high. He set an Outback Bowl record with five interceptions. He tied the Outback Bowl record with four touchdown passes. His 98 plays and 566 total yards were also Outback Bowl records. He threw four touchdown passes in the 38–35 loss that went to overtime, with two going to Andrew Brewer (39 and 35 yards), one to Drake Dunsmore for 66 yards, and one to Sidney Stewart for 18 yards. He finished second in rushing for Northwestern with 20 carries for 34 yards and a two-yard touchdown. He was named to ESPN.com's All-Big Ten Bowl team as an honorable mention.

Kafka was named Northwestern's Most Valuable Player on offense following the season. Kafka led the Big Ten in passing yards with 3,430 yards, total offense with 286.8 yards per game, completions with 24.5 per game, and fewest interceptions with 2.44 of all passes being intercepted. He was seventh nationally in completions, 16th in passing yards and 12th in total offensive yards. His 3,430 passing yards are third-most in school history. His 3,729 total offensive yards are second-most in school history.

In the 2010 East–West Shrine Game on January 23, Kafka started at quarterback for the East squad and, despite a slow start, led the East squad to a comeback victory. On the final drive of the game, Kafka threw a two-yard touchdown pass to Penn State tight end Andrew Quarless to win the game for the East squad, 13–10. After the game, Kafka was named Offensive MVP after he went 18-of-27, passed for 150 yards and threw the winning touchdown pass.

=== College statistics ===
Season	Games		Passing							Rushing			Receiving		
Season	GP	GS	Cmp	Att	Pct	Yds	TD	Int	Rtg	Att	Yds	TD	Rec	Yds	TD
2006	5	4	55	96	57.3	494	1	5	93.5	48	263	2	0	0	0
2007	2	0	2	3	66.7	11	0	0	97.5	2	8	0	0	0	0
2008	7	2	32	46	69.6	330	2	3	131.1	68	321	1	0	0	0
2009	13	13	319	492	64.8	3,430	16	12	129.2	150	299	8	1	24	1
Totals	27	19	408	637	64.1	4,265	19	20	123.9	268	891	11	1	24	1

His record for his career as the starting quarterback for Northwestern was 11–8. He finished his career as the third all-time leading quarterback rusher at Northwestern with 887 yards rushing, and as the eighth all-time leading passer with 4,265 yards passing.

== Professional playing career ==
=== Pre-draft ===
Prior to the 2010 NFL draft, Kafka was projected to be drafted in the sixth round by NFLDraftScout.com and as high as the fourth round. He was rated as the eleventh-best quarterback in the draft. Northwestern head coach Pat Fitzgerald said at the time that 85 NFL scouts, general managers and personnel directors who watched film or came to see a game or a practice said about Kafka was that he "throws a lot better than our No. 3 [quarterback] does right now." Fitzgerald also said that he would be "shocked" if Kafka was not drafted in the 2010 draft. After the Outback Bowl loss to Auburn on January 1, in which Kafka threw 78 passes for 532 yards, Fitzgerald said, "I hope the NFL sees the same thing that I see, a man with a big-time arm." An NFL general manager said at the 2010 Senior Bowl that Kafka could be drafted as high as the third round.

Kafka was invited to the 2010 NFL Scouting Combine in Indianapolis, which started on February 24, along with teammates Corey Wootton and Sherrick McManis. Kafka chose Mike McCartney of Priority Sports of Chicago as his agent, who also represented Wootton. Priority hired former Chicago Bears quarterback Erik Kramer and a trainer in Phoenix, Arizona, to help Kafka prepare for the NFL Scouting Combine. To get ready for the Combine, Kafka worked out twice a day in Arizona and held practice sessions with Notre Dame wide receiver Golden Tate. Kafka chose not to bench press at the NFL Combine. On February 28, Kafka answered 35 out of the 50 questions on the Wonderlic test, and was "99 percent sure" that he answered all 35 correctly. Kafka had some of the best measurements in the vertical jump, broad jump, 60-yard shuttle, and three-cone drill among all quarterbacks.

Pre-draft measurables
Height	Weight	Arm length	Hand span	40-yard dash	10-yard split	20-yard split	20-yard shuttle	Three-cone drill	Vertical jump	Broad jump
6 ft 3 1/8 in (1.91 m)	225 lb (102 kg)	33 1/2 in (0.85 m)	9 1/4 in (0.23 m)	5.04 s	1.73 s	2.90 s	4.37 s	6.96 s	32 in (0.81 m)	9 ft 2 in (2.79 m)
All values from 2010 NFL Scouting Combine

At Northwestern's Pro Day on March 11, Kafka passed to his former teammates Andrew Brewer and Zeke Markshausen, and, according to Gil Brandt, only missed one pass during the entire workout. 25 NFL teams attended the workout, including the Cincinnati Bengals quarterbacks coach Ken Zampese and the Arizona Cardinals quarterback coach Chris Miller. Northwestern held its second Pro Day workout on March 29. He passed to his former teammates Brewer, Markshausen, and Brendan Mitchell during the workout. He was reportedly not as accurate on the second Pro Day as he was on the first, but still "very accurate". 24 NFL team representatives attended the Pro Day. Kafka worked out for the Cincinnati Bengals, Cleveland Browns, New England Patriots, and Oakland Raiders prior to the draft.

Pre-draft measurables
Height	Weight	Arm length	Hand span	40-yard dash	10-yard split	20-yard split	20-yard shuttle	Three-cone drill	Vertical jump
6 ft 2 7/8 in (1.90 m)	222 lb (101 kg)	32 3/4 in (0.83 m)	9 in (0.23 m)	4.81 s	1.69 s	2.73 s	4.10 s	6.78 s	32.5 in (0.83 m)
All values from Northwestern Pro Day on March 29

In February, draft analyst Mike Mayock said that Kafka was "a developmental guy" who should stay on a team's practice squad for a year. By April, Mayock called Kafka the "sleeper" of the quarterback class, projecting him to be drafted in the sixth round. Mayock also said, "He's a really smart kid. Has a better arm than people think. I don't even think he's sleeping anymore. He was a month-and-a-half ago, but he's on the rise. He's a kid who could surprise people at the end of the day." Former NFL quarterback Ron Jaworski concurred, saying that Kafka "knows how to play the quarterback position. There's a real feel for hitting the open receiver, good anticipation. I can see him being one of those sleeper type guys." A scout before the draft said that Kafka "throws a lot of picks, but at least he's willing to pull the trigger. You don't see that from a lot of young kids."

=== Philadelphia Eagles ===
==== 2010 season ====
Kafka was selected by the Philadelphia Eagles in the fourth round (122nd overall) in the 2010 NFL draft. He was the fifth quarterback taken in the draft, behind Sam Bradford (1st overall), Tim Tebow (25th overall), Jimmy Clausen (48th overall) and Colt McCoy (85th overall). Kafka was expected to be the team's third-string quarterback behind Kevin Kolb and Michael Vick. Eagles head coach Andy Reid said of Kafka, "I think once you meet him, I think you'll see he's a smart guy. He has some of the intangible things – the leadership, he's a tough kid. Inner city, Chicago kid. He's got a little grit to him. I think that's important. You have to be wired right to handle you guys and play in the city of Philadelphia. I think he's wired right. He likes to compete." Kafka was signed to a four-year contract worth $2.256 million with $467,000 guaranteed on June 15, 2010.

In the final practice of rookie and selected veterans training camp on July 29, Kafka took all the snaps at quarterback after Kolb and Vick got practice off. After practice, offensive coordinator Marty Mornhinweg said Kafka was "the best rookie that I've ever had in 15, 16, 17 years or something like that. So, he's really sharp. Now, he's sharp book-wise, but he's also very intelligent in a football sense. He's really picked [the playbook] up very quickly."

In the first preseason game on August 14 against the Jacksonville Jaguars, Kafka went 3-for-7 for 76 yards and threw a 57-yard pass to wide receiver Chad Hall after taking over for Vick late in the third quarter. Kafka began the second preseason game on August 20 against the Cincinnati Bengals in the fourth quarter. He went 4-for-12 for 29 yards and two interceptions (both to cornerback Morgan Trent) with a passer rating of 2.4. He also had one carry for 24 yards. On August 27 against the Kansas City Chiefs, Kafka came into the game in the fourth quarter and went 9-for-13 for 93 yards and one touchdown. He led the Eagles on the winning drive with an 18-yard touchdown pass to Riley Cooper with 23 seconds left in the game to win, 20–17. In the final preseason game on September 2, Kafka replaced Vick during the second quarter and played for almost three quarters. He went 9-for-27 for 76 yards and an interception against the New York Jets.

During the 2010 regular season and playoffs, Kafka was inactive as the team's third quarterback for all but five games. In week two Kafka was the backup to Vick against the Detroit Lions after Kolb suffered a concussion in week one against the Green Bay Packers. In Week 5 against the San Francisco 49ers, week six against the Atlanta Falcons and week seven against the Tennessee Titans, Kafka was the backup to Kolb after Vick, who took over as the starting quarterback for the remainder of the season, suffered a rib injury in Week 4 against the Washington Redskins. In the week seventeen game against the Dallas Cowboys, Kafka was the backup quarterback to Kolb in a decision to rest Vick and the team's starters before the playoffs.

Kafka said of his rookie year that he "learned a lot about football. I learned a lot about being a professional, especially being around [Vick] and [Kolb]. Those guys have been great mentors, and obviously the coaching staff that I have has been really great as far as developing me to learn the west coast system."

==== 2011 season ====
Following the 2010 season, Kafka said that his goal for the 2011 offseason was to "continue to learn the offense. I haven't mastered it by any means, the more study and preparation I can get the better. Physically, I can work on my feet, my arm strength, and my timing and rhythm. There's a bunch of things I can work on, and I'm really excited to get to it." Eagles general manager Howie Roseman said Kafka is the hardest working player in the NFL, but needs to get bigger and stronger. The Eagles reportedly received trade offers from other teams for Kafka prior to the 2011 NFL draft but declined due to his potential. Kafka, in response, laughed and did not believe the rumors.

Because of the NFL lockout, Kafka and his teammates organized informal workouts in Marlton, New Jersey. After one of the workout sessions, Vick said Kafka was "ready for" the backup role and would embrace it should Kolb leave after the lifting of the lockout. Kolb was traded to the Arizona Cardinals on July 28 following the lifting of the NFL lockout, and Kafka was temporarily elevated to the backup behind Vick before the Eagles signed former Tennessee Titan Vince Young on July 29. Kafka took second-team reps at the start of training camp, but on the first official depth chart that was released on August 9, Kafka was listed as the third-stringer behind Young.

Against the Baltimore Ravens in the preseason opener on August 11, Kafka replaced Young at quarterback during the second quarter and played into the fourth quarter. He went 13-of-19 for 132 yards with one interception thrown to Ravens safety Bernard Pollard in the game. In the second week of the preseason on August 18 against the Pittsburgh Steelers, Kafka entered the game in the fourth quarter and led the Eagles to two scoring drives in a 24–14 loss. With less than four minutes remaining in the game, he threw a 14-yard touchdown pass to wide receiver Gerald Jones, and with only 19 seconds left on the following drive, threw a second touchdown pass to Jones for seven yards. He finished the game going 14-for-19 for 160 yards along with the two scores. Kafka played in garbage time in the next preseason game against the Cleveland Browns, handing the ball off twice and kneeling down twice. Against the New York Jets in the preseason finale, he filled in for the injured Young, who started the game, to start the third quarter. Kafka had the wind knocked out of him on a sack, but was able to play the rest of the game despite a rib contusion. He finished the game 7-for-11 for 76 yards and one interception. He went 34-for-49 for 369 yards, two touchdowns, and two interceptions in the preseason overall.

Young suffered a hamstring injury in the final preseason game, and was subsequently inactive for the team's first two games. Kafka was active as the backup to Vick in both games, but was forced to play in the second game when Vick suffered a concussion in the second half. Kafka went 7-of-9 passing for 72 yards in relief during the 35–31 loss to the Atlanta Falcons. Vick broke his hand during a week 3 game against the New York Giants on September 25, so Kafka again replaced him. Kafka threw for 35 yards and two interceptions as he went 4-for-7 passing. Both Kafka and Young were active as Vick's backups in week 4, with neither seeing playing time. Kafka was declared inactive for week 5, but returned as active for weeks 6 and 8. He was inactive again for weeks 9 and 10, before he was activated for the rest of the season's games. Young started at quarterback in weeks 11, 12, and 13 in place of an injured Vick, elevating Kafka to backup. Kafka saw playing action in two of the final games of the season with no pass attempts.

==== 2012 season ====
With Young not returning to the Eagles with his contract expiring after the 2011 season, Kafka was expected to be the backup quarterback behind Vick for the 2012 season. Trent Edwards was signed to a one-year contract on February 23, 2012, and the team drafted Nick Foles in the third round of the 2012 NFL draft to compete with Kafka for spots on the roster. Kafka was considered the favorite to win the backup job during training camp. According to Adam Caplan from thesidelineview.com, Kafka showed during OTAs that "his arm strength has noticeably improved" since his previous two seasons. In the first preseason game on August 9 against the Pittsburgh Steelers, Kafka suffered a fracture in his non-throwing hand after passing for 31 yards and an interception. Foles was named the backup quarterback over Kafka and Edwards on August 29, and Kafka was released in favor of Edwards during final roster cuts on August 31, having sat out the remaining three preseason games for the Eagles.

=== New England Patriots ===
The Kansas City Chiefs and Green Bay Packers reportedly had interest in signing Kafka immediately after his release from the Eagles. The New England Patriots worked Kafka out on September 4, and the Pittsburgh Steelers worked him out on November 20. The Patriots signed him to a reserve/future contract on January 4, 2013, after he sat out the entire 2012 regular season. Kafka was expected to compete with Ryan Mallett for the backup job behind Tom Brady, but he was released on June 10 in favor of newly signed Tim Tebow.

=== Jacksonville Jaguars ===
The Jacksonville Jaguars claimed Kafka off waivers on June 11, 2013, one day after his release by the Patriots. The Dallas Cowboys had also put in a claim for him. The general manager for the Jaguars, Dave Caldwell, said on June 13 that Kafka had as good of a chance at being named the starting quarterback as Blaine Gabbert, Chad Henne, or Matt Scott had. Kafka was the third quarterback to play in the first preseason game for the Jaguars on August 9 against the Miami Dolphins after Henne and Gabbert. He went 4-of-8 for 19 yards and an interception in the game. In the second week of the preseason, he went 1-for-3 for −4 yards. He did not play in the team's third preseason game, but passed for 46 yards and a touchdown in the fourth game. The Jaguars signed Ricky Stanzi on August 27 for additional competition for the team's third quarterback job. Kafka and Scott were both released in favor of Stanzi during final roster cuts on August 30, 2013.

=== Tampa Bay Buccaneers ===
After his release from the Jaguars, the Chicago Bears worked out Kafka on October 25, 2013, the Tampa Bay Buccaneers worked him out on November 5, the Atlanta Falcons worked him out on November 19, and the Dallas Cowboys worked him out on February 6, 2014. He signed with the Buccaneers on February 10. During training camp, Kafka competed against Alex Tanney for the third-string quarterback spot behind Josh McCown and Mike Glennon. Kafka went 2-of-7 for 14 yards in the first preseason game, 4-of-11 for 55 yards and a touchdown in the second preseason game, and 7-of-14 for 86 yards and a touchdown in the fourth preseason game. He was released during final roster cuts with Tanney on August 30, 2014, but was subsequently re-signed to the team's practice squad on August 31. After spending the first three weeks of the season on the practice squad, Kafka was promoted to the active roster on September 25 due to an injury suffered by starter McCown. He was active but did not play in the first three weeks he was on the active roster. He was declared inactive in week 8 with McCown healthy again, and he was waived on October 28. Kafka later said he told McCown he needed to stay on the active roster for week 8 in order to qualify for the NFL's pension program, and McCown facilitated his stay for one more week with head coach Lovie Smith. He was re-signed to the practice squad on October 30. At the conclusion of the 2014 NFL season, Kafka's practice squad contract expired and he was not re-signed by the team.

=== Minnesota Vikings ===
Kafka was invited to work out at the first NFL veteran combine on March 22, 2015. The veteran combine was created as a way for unemployed players to potentially work their way back into the league by going through drills in front of NFL scouts and coaches. Daniel Jeremiah of NFL Network said that he has "never seen [Kafka] throw it as well as he did on the field" and that he expected Kafka to sign with a team following his workout. The Minnesota Vikings signed Kafka to a one-year contract worth $660,000 on April 1, 2015. He was expected to compete with rookie undrafted signee Taylor Heinicke for the third quarterback job behind starter Teddy Bridgewater and backup Shaun Hill.

In the 2015 Pro Football Hall of Fame Game, in which the Vikings played the Pittsburgh Steelers, Kafka replaced Bridgewater as a member of the team's backup offense in the middle of the second quarter. Kafka threw a 34-yard touchdown pass to rookie tight end MyCole Pruitt, before he was substituted for Heinicke in the third quarter. Kafka did not play in the team's second preseason game, against the Tampa Bay Buccaneers, and he was the fourth quarterback to play in the third game against the Oakland Raiders. He played one drive in the fourth preseason game, throwing an incomplete pass against the Dallas Cowboys, before suffering a hamstring strain. The Vikings waived/injured him on September 1, and he was placed on season-ending injured reserve on September 2 after he cleared waivers. He was waived off of the injured reserve list on September 15.

=== Tennessee Titans ===
The Tennessee Titans gave Kafka a workout after week 14, and he signed with their practice squad on December 16, as the third quarterback on the roster behind Marcus Mariota and Zach Mettenberger. After Mariota suffered a knee injury in a week 15 game against the Patriots, the team re-signed Alex Tanney to the active roster to serve as the backup quarterback to Mettenberger in week 16. The Titans released Kafka from the practice squad and signed Bryn Renner in his place on December 22, 2015.

=== Cincinnati Bengals ===
The Cincinnati Bengals' starting quarterback, Andy Dalton, suffered a thumb injury in Week 14, and the team's backup, A. J. McCarron injured his wrist in Week 16, leaving the team with one fully healthy quarterback on the roster, third-stringer Keith Wenning. The team signed Kafka to their practice squad on December 29, 2015, one week after his release from the Titans. After the Bengals were defeated in the wild-card round of the 2015–16 NFL playoffs, his practice squad contract with the team expired and he was not re-signed.

NFL career statistics
Year	Team	Games		Passing								Rushing			
Year	Team	GP	GS	Cmp	Att	Pct	Yds	Y/A	TD	Int	Rtg	Att	Yds	Avg	TD
2011	PHI	4	0	11	16	68.8	107	6.7	0	2	47.7	3	0	0.0	0
Career		4	0	11	16	68.8	107	6.7	0	2	47.7	3	0	0.0	0

== Coaching career ==
=== Kansas City Chiefs ===
On March 29, 2016, Kafka was hired as an offensive graduate assistant at Northwestern University. A year later, on February 7, 2017, Kafka was hired by the Kansas City Chiefs to be their offensive quality control coach, reuniting him with a coach from his playing career, Andy Reid. Kafka was promoted to quarterbacks coach on January 26, 2018. In 2018, Chiefs quarterback Patrick Mahomes earned his first Pro Bowl selection and was named NFL Most Valuable Player after the season. The Chiefs went to the AFC Championship Game but lost to the New England Patriots.

Mahomes was named to his second Pro Bowl during the 2019 season. The Chiefs won Super Bowl LIV on February 2, 2020, against the San Francisco 49ers, with Mahomes earning Super Bowl MVP honors. The Chiefs gave Kafka an additional coaching title of passing game coordinator on March 6, 2020. Mahomes earned a third Pro Bowl selection in 2020. The Chiefs appeared in Super Bowl LV, with the Tampa Bay Buccaneers defeating them 31–9. Kafka missed the team's week 16 game in 2021 against the Pittsburgh Steelers due to COVID-19 protocols. The Chiefs appeared in the AFC Championship Game for the fourth consecutive season, losing to the Cincinnati Bengals 27–24. Mahomes earned another Pro Bowl selection following the season.

=== New York Giants ===
Kafka was hired by the New York Giants on February 11, 2022, to be their offensive coordinator under newly hired head coach Brian Daboll. Kafka called the offensive plays for the team during the preseason and training camp. On September 5, 2022, it was announced that Kafka would remain the play-caller for the regular season after a strong preseason. In 2022, the Giants earned their first postseason win in 11 seasons.

Kafka interviewed with the Carolina Panthers, Houston Texans, and Indianapolis Colts for their head coach positions on January 22, 2023; the Arizona Cardinals interviewed him for their head coach job on January 31. He completed second interviews with the Texans on January 25 and Cardinals on February 7.

Kafka had a virtual interview with the Tennessee Titans for their head coach job on January 12, 2024. He interviewed for the Seattle Seahawks head coaching position as well, but was blocked by the Giants from interviewing for the Seahawks' offensive coordinator position. Kafka was the head coach for the West team during the 2024 East–West Shrine Bowl on February 1, 2024. He was given an additional title of assistant head coach by the Giants on February 7, 2024; however, he was removed from play-calling duties by the team for the 2024 season.

Kafka interviewed virtually with the Chicago Bears and New Orleans Saints for their head coaching positions on January 9, 2025, and had an in-person interview with the Saints on January 25. He was selected as a head coach for the 2025 Senior Bowl on February 1. Daboll assigned Kafka as offensive play-caller again for the 2025 season. Kafka was named the interim head coach for the Giants following Daboll's firing on November 10. In seven games as interim head coach, the Giants had a 2–5 record.

Kafka interviewed for the Giants' full-time head coaching position by January 7, 2026. He also had a virtual interview for the Tampa Bay Buccaneers' offensive coordinator job on January 13. He interviewed with the Detroit Lions for their vacant offensive coordinator position on January 14, and with the Philadelphia Eagles for their offensive coordinator spot by January 17.

=== Detroit Lions ===
The Detroit Lions hired Kafka as passing game coordinator on February 23, 2026.

== Head coaching record ==
Team	Year	Regular season					Postseason			
Team	Year	Won	Lost	Ties	Win %	Finish	Won	Lost	Win %	Result
NYG*	2025	2	5	0	.286	4th in NFC East	—	—	—	—
Total		2	5	0	.286		—	—	—	

* – Interim head coach

== Personal life ==
Kafka's mother was born in Puerto Rico, before moving with her parents to the Bronx when she was 3. Kafka majored in communication studies at Northwestern University. Mike's brother, Jason, was a pitcher for the independent Windy City ThunderBolts and attended St. Rita of Cascia High School. Both Kafkas were recruited by Ken Margerum, who is now an assistant at San Jose State. Mike Kafka and his wife Allison have a daughter.

Kafka worked as an instructor at former Northwestern teammate Brett Basanez's prep quarterback development camps in Woodbury, Minnesota and Minnetonka, Minnesota, in mid-2011. Kafka worked at a Pop Warner Football passing camp, Three5Seven, with former Northwestern teammate Chris Malleo in July 2011. On November 13, 2014, Kafka started a Kickstarter campaign for his product, the Roo Inferno, a type of hand warmer for both athletes and outdoor enthusiasts. The campaign successfully gained $15,974 from 124 backers on December 18, 2014. With help from the NFL and the University of Miami, Kafka began an executive Master of Business Administration program catered towards NFL players in 2015.
