= Drake Dunsmore =

American football player (born 1988)

No. 81
- Position: Tight end

Personal information
- Born: November 4, 1988 (age 38); Lenexa, Kansas, U.S.
- Listed height: 6 ft 3 in (1.91 m)
- Listed weight: 235 lb (107 kg)

Career information
- High school: Saint Thomas Aquinas (Overland Park, Kansas)
- College: Northwestern
- NFL draft: 2012: 7th round, 233rd overall pick

Career history
- Tampa Bay Buccaneers (2012)*
- * Offseason or practice squad member only

Awards and highlights
- Big Ten Tight End of the Year (2011); First-team All-Big Ten (2011)
- Stats at Pro Football Reference

Drake C. Dunsmore (born November 4, 1988) is an American former professional football player who was a tight end in the National Football League (NFL). He played college football for the Northwestern Wildcats, earning inaugural Big Ten Tight End of the Year honors in 2011. He holds the Northwestern single-game receiving touchdowns record and the career tight end receiving yards record. Drake Dunsmore is the son of Pat Dunsmore.

== Early life ==
Dunsmore finished in fourth place in the 2000 Kansas Kids State Wrestling Tournament in the 10-under age group in the 100-pound (45.36 kg) weight class. Like his National Football League-veteran father, Pat, Drake Dunsmore never played organized football before high school. He was a 2005 honorable mention All-Class 5A State selection as a junior. He was a 2006 first-team All-Class 5A State selection and third-team All-State selection as a senior. Dunsmore was the 20th rated tight end in the national high school class of 2007 according to ESPN and the 15th rated football player in the 2007 class in the state of Kansas according to Rivals.com. He earned three varsity letters in track and two in baseball. Dunsmore chose Northwestern over competing football scholarships from Arizona State, Kansas State, Tulsa and Colorado State for a variety of reasons, including academics, the coaching staff and the fact that two aunts and a grandmother reside close to campus. He declined his invitation to participate in the August 3, 2007, Kansas Shrine Bowl due to his ongoing rehabilitation.

College recruiting
Name	Hometown	School	Height	Weight	40^{‡}	Commit date
Drake Dunsmore; TE	Overland Park, Kansas	Saint Thomas Aquinas (KS)	6 ft 3 in (1.91 m)	214.5 lb (97.3 kg)	4.6	Aug 20, 2006
Drake Dunsmore; TE	Recruit ratings: Scout: Rivals: (77)					
Overall recruit ranking: Rivals: 15 (KS) ESPN: 20 (TE)
Note: In many cases, Scout, Rivals, 247Sports, On3, and ESPN may conflict in their listings of height and weight.; In these cases, the average was taken. ESPN grades are on a 100-point scale.; Sources: "Northwestern Football Commitments". Rivals.; "2007 Northwestern Football Commits". Scout.; "ESPN". ESPN.; "Scout.com Team Recruiting Rankings". Scout.; "2007 Team Ranking". Rivals.com.

== College career ==
2007–08

Dunsmore was one of two Northwestern true freshmen to play for the 2007 Northwestern Wildcats. He had a pair of 35-yard receptions against Duke on September 15, 2007. He was named to the 2007 Sporting News Big Ten All-Freshman Team. Dunsmore redshirted for the 2008 Big Ten Conference football season after injuring his anterior cruciate ligament on the fifth day of practice during his sophomore year.

2009

On September 19, 2009, Dunsmore had a 10-reception, 90-yard effort against Syracuse Orange, including a 22-yard touchdown. He caught the touchdown that gave the 2009 Wildcats a 14–10 lead over the then-undefeated 9–0 number 4-ranked Iowa Hawkeyes in their 17–10 November 7 victory that gave Northwestern its sixth victory of the season and made them bowl-eligible. In the January 1, 2010 Outback Bowl, he tallied 120 yards receiving on 9 receptions as part of Mike Kafka's 532-yard passing effort against Auburn Tigers. The 66-yard Kafka to Dunsmore touchdown is the longest passing touchdown in Northwestern bowl game history. He was the second leading receiver among Big Ten tight ends (behind Garrett Graham) for the 2009 Big Ten Conference football season although he only started 7 of 13 games in 2009. Dunsmore earned Academic All-Big Ten recognition.

2010

Two of Dunsmore's five receptions were touchdowns in the September 11 victory against Illinois State. He posted an 8-reception effort in a 21–17 victory over a number 13-ranked Iowa team on November 13. Dunsmore earned Academic All-Big Ten recognition a second time. He was a 2010 honorable mention All-Big Ten (coaches and media) selection.

2011

Dunsmore had a four-touchdown, 112-yard game against Indiana in a 59–38 victory on October 29. The four receiving touchdowns set a Northwestern record, while tying a Memorial Stadium record, and earned him Big Ten Offensive Player of the Week. He earned his third Academic All-Big Ten recognition. Dunsmore was a 2011 first-team All-Big Ten (coaches and media) selection. He established the Northwestern career receiving yards record for tight ends of 1567 yards and was one of eight semifinalists for the John Mackey Award. Dunsmore was the inaugural 2011 Big Ten Kwalick-Clark Tight End of the Year.

== Professional career ==
Dunsmore finished fifth among tight ends at the NFL Scouting Combine in the 40-yard dash with a time of 4.64. He had a pair of first-place finishes among tight ends in the 3 cone drill with a time of 6.73 and in the 20-yard shuttle with a time of 4.03. He finished third among tight ends in the 60-yard shuttle with a time of 11.47. He ranked fifth among tight ends in both the bench press with a total of 21 and in the vertical jump with a height of 35.5 inches (90 cm). He placed seventh among tight ends in the standing long jump with a distance of 9 feet 9 inches (2.97 m).

Pre-draft measurables
Height	Weight	Arm length	Hand span	40-yard dash	20-yard shuttle	Three-cone drill	Vertical jump	Broad jump	Bench press
6 ft 2 in (1.88 m)	241 lb (109 kg)	32 3/4	9 5/8	4.64 s	4.03 s	6.73 s	35.5 in (0.90 m)	9 ft 9 in (2.97 m)	21 reps
All values from NFL Combine

Dunsmore was selected by the Tampa Bay Buccaneers in the seventh round of the 2012 NFL Draft with the 233rd selection overall. He is one of two Northwestern Wildcats and 41 Big Ten players drafted. He is small for an NFL tight end. According to ESPN's Todd McShay, Dunsmore is projected as a special teams player.

On May 7, 2012, Buccaneers.com announced that Dunsmore had agreed to a four-year deal with Buccaneers, making him officially a member of the Tampa Bay Buccaneers's Roster. The deal was reportedly worth $2.15 million over four years. Dunsmore began the 2012 NFL season on the practice squad for the Buccaneers. Following the 2013 NFL draft and the Buccaneers undrafted free agent signings, Dunsmore retired.
