= 2009 Northwestern Wildcats football team =

American college football season

2009 Northwestern Wildcats football

Outback Bowl, L 35–38 ^{OT} vs. Auburn
- Conference: Big Ten Conference
- Record: 8–5 (5–3 Big Ten)
- Head coach: Pat Fitzgerald (4th season)
- Offensive coordinator: Mick McCall (2nd season)
- Offensive scheme: Spread
- Defensive coordinator: Mike Hankwitz (2nd season)
- Base defense: Multiple 4–3
- Captains: Mike Kafka; Sherrick McManis; Brendan Smith; Corey Wootton
- Home stadium: Ryan Field

2009 Big Ten Conference football standings
	Conf.			Overall
Team	W		L	W		L
No. 5 Ohio State $	7	–	1	11	–	2
No. 7 Iowa %	6	–	2	11	–	2
No. 9 Penn State	6	–	2	11	–	2
Northwestern	5	–	3	8	–	5
No. 16 Wisconsin	5	–	3	10	–	3
Michigan State	4	–	4	6	–	7
Purdue	4	–	4	5	–	7
Minnesota	3	–	5	6	–	7
Illinois	2	–	6	3	–	9
Michigan	1	–	7	5	–	7
Indiana	1	–	7	4	–	8
$ – BCS representative as conference champion; % – BCS at-large representative; Rankings from AP Poll

The 2009 Northwestern Wildcats football team represented Northwestern University in the Big Ten during the 2009 NCAA Division I FBS football season. Pat Fitzgerald, in his fourth season at Northwestern, was the team's head coach. The Wildcats home games were played at Ryan Field in Evanston, Illinois. The Wildcats finished the season 8–5, 5–3 in Big Ten play and lost in the Outback Bowl 35–38 in overtime against Auburn.

== Schedule ==
Date	Time	Opponent	Site	TV	Result	Attendance
September 5	11:00 am	Towson*	Ryan Field; Evanston, IL	BTN	W 47–14	17,857
September 12	11:00 am	Eastern Michigan*	Ryan Field; Evanston, IL	BTN	W 27–24	19,239
September 19	6:00 pm	at Syracuse*	Carrier Dome; Syracuse, NY	TWCSN	L 34–37	40,251
September 26	11:00 am	Minnesota	Ryan Field; Evanston, IL	BTN	L 24–35	22,091
October 3	11:00 am	at Purdue	Ross–Ade Stadium; West Lafayette, IN	BTN	W 27–21	47,163
October 10	11:00 am	Miami (OH)*	Ryan Field; Evanston, IL	BTN	W 16–6	23,085
October 17	11:00 am	at Michigan State	Spartan Stadium; East Lansing, MI	ESPN2	L 14–24	71,726
October 24	11:00 am	Indiana^{†}	Ryan Field; Evanston, IL	BTN	W 29–28	24,364
October 31	3:30 pm	No. 12 Penn State	Ryan Field; Evanston, IL	ESPN	L 13–34	30,546
November 7	11:00 am	at No. 8 Iowa	Kinnick Stadium; Iowa City, IA	ESPN	W 17–10	70,585
November 14	11:00 am	at Illinois	Memorial Stadium; Champaign, IL (Land of Lincoln Trophy)	ESPNC	W 21–16	60,523
November 21	2:30 pm	No. 17 Wisconsin	Ryan Field; Evanston, IL	BTN	W 33–31	32,150
January 1	10:00 am	vs. Auburn*	Raymond James Stadium; Tampa, FL (Outback Bowl)	ESPN	L 35–38 ^{OT}	49,383
*Non-conference game; ^{†}Homecoming; Rankings from AP Poll released prior to the game; All times are in Central time

== Game summaries ==
=== Towson ===
	1	2	3	4	Total
Tigers	0	7	7	0	14
Wildcats	21	16	3	7	47

It was apparent that Towson didn't stand a chance from the get-go. Northwestern raced out to a 30–0 lead before putting in the reserves out of mercy. To Towson's credit, they did go toe-to-toe with Northwestern's second and third stringers, which is no small feat, given that Northwestern is a somewhat prestigious FBS school and Towson is a mostly unheralded FCS school. The game allowed both teams to get some experience for the future and the final 35 minutes gave Northwestern's younger players some good game experience. This would prove to be one of Northwestern's few blowout wins of the 2009 season.

=== Eastern Michigan ===
	1	2	3	4	Total
Eagles	0	3	7	14	24
Wildcats	7	14	0	6	27

Northwestern seemed poised to cruise to another dominating blowout victory when they raced out to a 21–3 halftime lead and still held a fairly comfortable 21–10 lead after three quarters and widened the lead to 24–10 early in the 4th. Northwestern eventually found themselves only ahead 24–17 and soon the game was tied at 24–24. To avoid the game going into overtime, the Wildcats finished off the stubborn Eagles with a field goal.

=== Syracuse ===
	1	2	3	4	Total
Wildcats	0	21	7	6	34
Orange	17	7	3	10	37

After their win against Eastern Michigan, Northwestern faced Syracuse at the Carrier Dome. Syracuse had played Minnesota in a close game in week one before losing against Penn State, who didn't allow a single Orange point until the reserves were all subbed in. Syracuse won the game by converting a field goal as time expired to break the tie. This put Syracuse at 1–2 and Northwestern at 2–1.

=== Minnesota ===
	1	2	3	4	Total
Golden Gophers	7	7	7	14	35
Wildcats	3	7	14	0	24

Going toe-to-toe with a Gophers team that had beaten the same Syracuse team that the Wildcats had lost to, Northwestern played a close game with Minnesota, even leading 24–21 going into the final quarter before Minnesota took back momentum to win the game 35–24, putting the Wildcats at 2–2.

=== Purdue ===
	1	2	3	4	Total
Wildcats	3	13	3	8	27
Boilermakers	14	7	0	0	21

The Boilermakers raced out to a 14–3 first quarter lead and held 21–16 halftime lead, but the Wildcats steal one from the Boilermakers (who would later on upset the Buckeyes) with a second half rally. Still trailing 21–19 after three, the final Northwestern touchdown put them ahead 27–21 for the win.

=== Miami (OH) ===
	1	2	3	4	Total
Redhawks	0	0	0	6	6
Wildcats	10	0	6	0	16

Unlike the game with Eastern Michigan, this one wouldn't come down to theatrics, Northwestern led 10–0 after one and scored six more in the third quarter to take a commanding 16–0 lead. Poised for the shutout, Miami got on the board late in the fourth quarter, but Northwestern denied them the two-point conversion to make it a game.

=== Michigan State ===
	1	2	3	4	Total
Wildcats	0	7	0	7	14
Spartans	0	0	17	7	24

Facing another better than their record Big Ten team, this time Northwestern wouldn't get so lucky. Leading 7–0 at halftime, they soon trailed 17–7 after three, and despite giving Michigan State all they could handle, the game was destined to go Sparty's way.

=== Indiana ===
	1	2	3	4	Total
Hoosiers	21	7	0	0	28
Wildcats	0	17	2	10	29

In addition to losses to Iowa (42–24) and Ohio State (33–14), Indiana also faced a 47–7 loss to Virginia and a 31–20 loss to Penn State. Against Northwestern, Indiana took a 21–0 first quarter lead, but would eventually lose after Northwestern scored 10 fourth quarter points.

=== Penn State ===
	1	2	3	4	Total
Nittany Lions	3	7	3	21	34
Wildcats	3	10	0	0	13

Handing Northwestern their only blowout loss of 2009, Penn State was shut down by Northwestern's offense for the first 40 minutes of the game until they finally got some momentum late in the third quarter, scoring three rapid fourth-quarter touchdowns to give the game an appearance of being a much easier win for Penn State than it really was. Northwestern quarterback Mike Kafka was injured late in the game, which led to backup Dan Persa being thrust under the lights. After the injury, NU's offense could do little against the vaunted Penn State defense. Regardless, this was Northwestern's only humiliating loss of what was a mostly positive 2009 season.

=== Iowa ===
	1	2	3	4	Total
Wildcats	0	14	0	3	17
Hawkeyes	10	0	0	0	10

Licking their wounds from the massacre at the hands of Penn State, the Wildcats traveled to Kinnick Stadium to take on the undefeated Hawkeyes, ranked #4 in the BCS, fresh off of a 42–24 blowout win over Indiana, who actually led 21–7 early on over Iowa and still led 24–14 deep in the game before Iowa took command in the second half. It looked early on like Iowa was poised to make mincemeat out of Northwestern as Penn State had done a week before. This game wouldn't go Iowa's way, however; the Hawkeyes would lose their star quarterback Ricky Stanzi in the second quarter and would never recover. Northwestern nabs their best win of 2009 by upsetting then #6 Iowa (who would finish #7 in the nation) 17–10 on the road.

=== Illinois ===
	1	2	3	4	Total
Wildcats	0	7	7	7	21
Fighting Illini	0	3	0	13	16

Illinois was bowl ineligible and had little to play for except pride, which they played with in this game and had shown increasing amounts of since their 38–13 upset of Michigan. Northwestern controlled the game for three quarters before Illinois suddenly sprang to life, but the Wildcats hung on to beat the pesky Illini 21–16, and win the inaugural Land of Lincoln Trophy, which replaced the Sweet Sioux Tomahawk.

=== Wisconsin ===
	1	2	3	4	Total
Badgers	0	14	10	7	31
Wildcats	10	17	3	3	33

Northwestern managed to grab their second major upset of 2009 against the Badgers under the lights at Ryan Field. It looked like Wisconsin was going to get blown out as the Wildcats raced out to a 27–14 halftime lead, but Wisconsin fought back to make it 30–24 after three, but Northwestern recovered a fumble on Wisky's final drive to hang on to their second big upset of 2009, winning 33–31.

=== Auburn—Outback Bowl ===
	1	2	3	4	OT	Total
Wildcats	7	0	14	14	0	35
Tigers	14	7	0	14	3	38

In what is remembered as one of the most entertaining bowl games of all time, Mike Kafka set bowl game records with 78 passing attempts and 47 completions. After a back and forth affair with numerous turnovers and missed field goals, overtime seemed only fitting. With kicker Stefan Demos hurt, Northwestern tried a fake field goal which failed, giving Auburn, the next year's national champions, the victory.

== Roster ==
2009 Northwestern Wildcats football team roster
Players
Coaches
Offense

Pos.	#	Name	Class
WR	2	Lee Coleman	Jr
WR	8	Demetrius Fields	Fr
QB	13	Mike Kafka (C)	Sr

Defense

Pos.	#	Name	Class
DE	98	Corbin Bryant	Jr
DE	99	Corey Wootton (C)	Sr

Special teams

Pos.	#	Name	Class

Head coach

- Pat Fitzgerald

Coordinators/assistant coaches

Legend

- (C) Team captain
- (S) Suspended
- (I) Ineligible
- Injured
- Redshirt

Roster
