= Ben Tate =

American football player (born 1988)

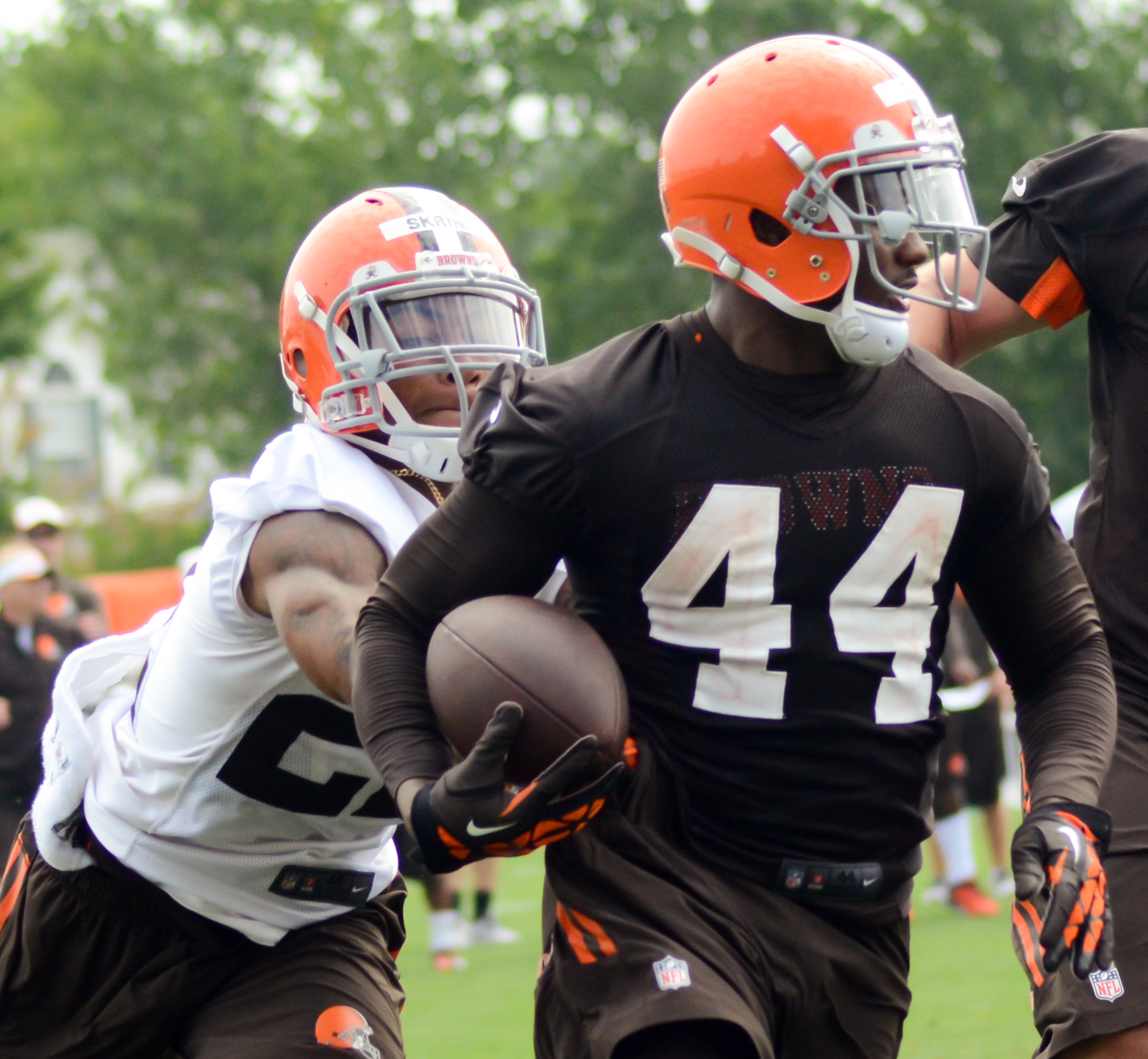
- Tate with the Cleveland Browns in 2014

No. 44, 33, 34
- Position: Running back

Personal information
- Born: August 21, 1988 (age 38); Woodbridge, Virginia, U.S.
- Listed height: 5 ft 11 in (1.80 m)
- Listed weight: 220 lb (100 kg)

Career information
- High school: Snow Hill (MD); Stephen Decatur (Berlin, Maryland)
- College: Auburn (2006–2009)
- NFL draft: 2010: 2nd round, 58th overall pick

Career history
- Houston Texans (2010–2013); Cleveland Browns (2014); Minnesota Vikings (2014); Pittsburgh Steelers (2014)

Awards and highlights
- Second-team All-SEC (2009)

Career NFL statistics
- Rushing attempts: 540
- Rushing yards: 2,363
- Receptions: 67
- Receiving yards: 347
- Total touchdowns: 14
- Stats at Pro Football Reference

Benjamin Franklin Tate (born August 21, 1988) is an American former professional football player who was a running back in the National Football League (NFL). He was selected by the Houston Texans in the second round of the 2010 NFL draft. He played college football for the Auburn Tigers. Tate also played for the Cleveland Browns, Minnesota Vikings, and Pittsburgh Steelers.

== Early life ==
Tate attended Stephen Decatur High School until his junior year, where he was a two-sport star in football and track. He played football as a running back for the Decatur Seahawks. As a junior, he set the Maryland state single-season rushing record with 2,886 yards and 25 touchdowns, averaging 221.4 yards per game. His performance earned him first-team All-state honors. As a senior, he transferred to Snow Hill High School, where he ran for 2,069 yards and 21 touchdowns, averaging 12.9 yards per carry while leading Snow Hill to a state runner-up finish. In 37 career games, Tate rushed 542 times for 5,920 yards and 78 touchdowns, averaging 10.9 yards per carry and 160 yards per game. He also had 210 career receiving yards. Tate also set the Maryland state records for both career yards rushing (5,920) and total career offensive yards (6,123). For his senior performance, he was awarded the Gatorade State Player of the year and was a consensus All-state pick.

Also a standout track & field athlete, Tate competed as a sprinter and was a state-qualifier in the 100 and 200-meter dashes, reaching the Maryland state finals in both events as a freshman while also placing in the top-three as a sophomore. In addition, Tate also recorded a 4.41-second 40-yard dash, had a 32-inch vertical jump and reportedly bench-pressed a maximum of 355 lb (163 kg) and squatted 630 lb (290 kg).

Regarded as a four-star recruit by Rivals.com, Tate was ranked No. 6 nationally among running backs and the No. 2 player from the state of Maryland. Upon graduation from Snow Hill High School, Tate received scholarship offers from Auburn, Virginia, Penn State, Maryland, and North Carolina before accepting a scholarship to Auburn University.

== College career ==
=== Freshman year ===
Tate played sparingly behind senior Kenny Irons, and gained 392 yards on 54 carries in 9 games. He received Freshman All-America Honorable Mention from The Sporting News. Ben's best game was a 156-yard performance against Tulane.

=== Sophomore year ===
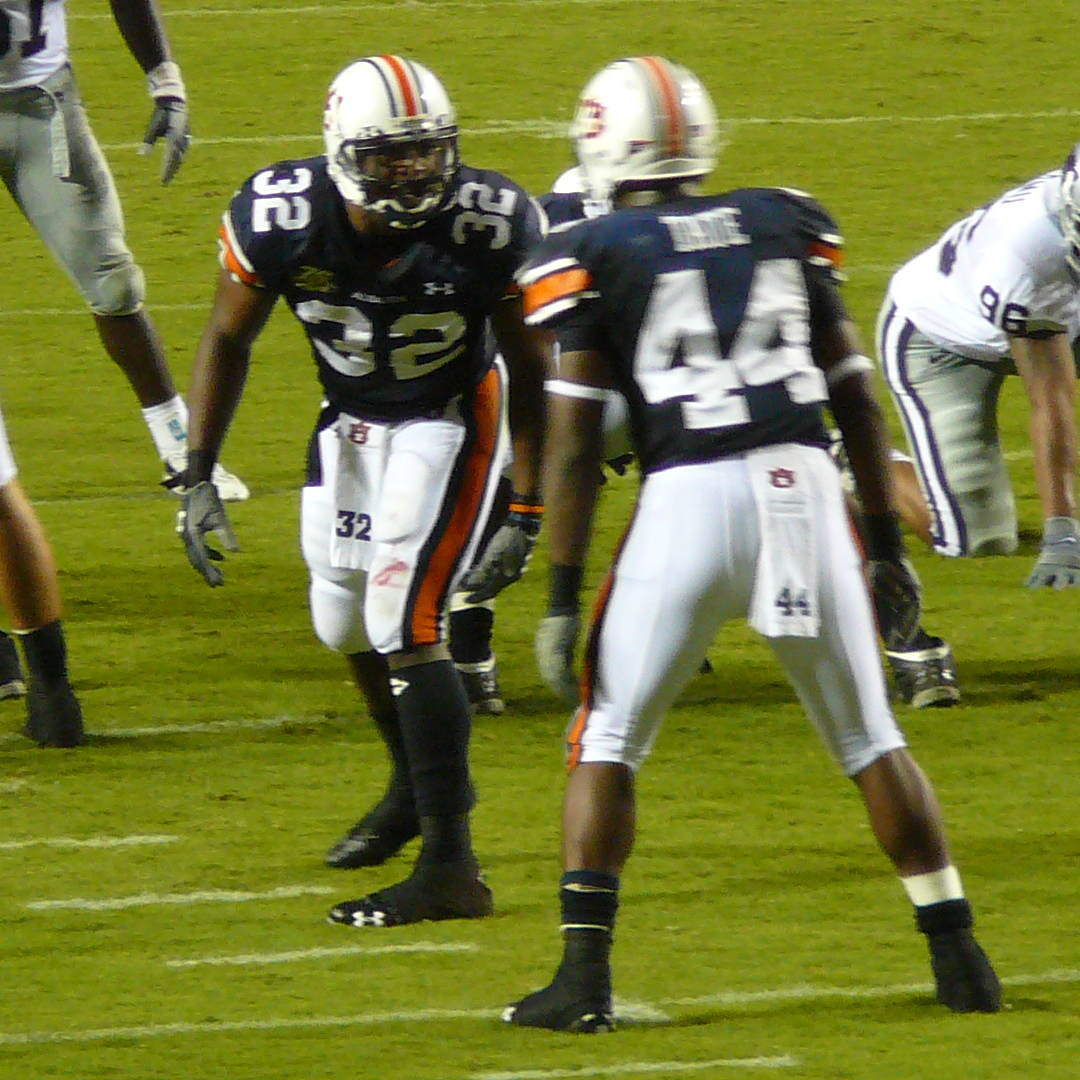
Tate (#44) talks with teammate Carl Stewart during a 2007 game at Auburn.

Tate's sophomore season was a strong one, leading the Tigers in rushing (903 yards on 202 carries for a 4.5 yard average) and to a victory over Clemson in the Chick-fil-A Bowl.

=== Junior year ===
Heading into his Junior campaign, Tate was named to several preseason All-SEC teams. However, because of new offensive coordinator Tony Franklin and his spread, pass-first style of offense, Tate's numbers significantly declined. He gained only 664 yards on 159 carries.

=== Senior year ===
As the feature back in Gus Malzahn's spread offense, Tate shined in his final college season. He gained 1,362 yards on 263 carries with 10 touchdowns. His top performance came against Arkansas, rushing for 184 yards and two touchdowns (over 100 yards coming in the third quarter). Tate also earned AP second-team All-SEC honors, as well as being voted both the Team and Offense MVP award. Tate was also a semi-finalist for the Doak Walker Award. Tate also led Auburn to a victory over Northwestern in the Outback Bowl, rushing for 108 yards and 2 touchdowns in the overtime win.

Tate finished at Auburn 5th on the career rushing list, behind Auburn greats Bo Jackson, Carnell Williams, James Brooks, and Joe Cribbs. He rushed for 3321 yards on 678 carries, scoring 24 touchdowns. Tate graduated in May 2009 with a degree in criminology.

== Professional career ==
Pre-draft measurables
Height	Weight	Arm length	Hand span	40-yard dash	10-yard split	20-yard split	20-yard shuttle	Three-cone drill	Vertical jump	Broad jump	Bench press
5 ft 11 in (1.80 m)	220 lb (100 kg)	31 1/4 in (0.79 m)	9 in (0.23 m)	4.43 s	1.49 s	2.52 s	4.12 s	6.91 s	40.5 in (1.03 m)	10 ft 4 in (3.15 m)	26 reps
All values from the NFL Combine

=== Houston Texans ===
Tate was selected in the second round of the 2010 NFL draft by the Houston Texans with the 58th overall pick. Most projected Tate to be picked somewhere in the early to middle of the second round, and recognizing his value at pick 58, the Texans aggressively traded up to draft him. This is the only time in team history that the Texans have drafted a running back earlier than the third round.

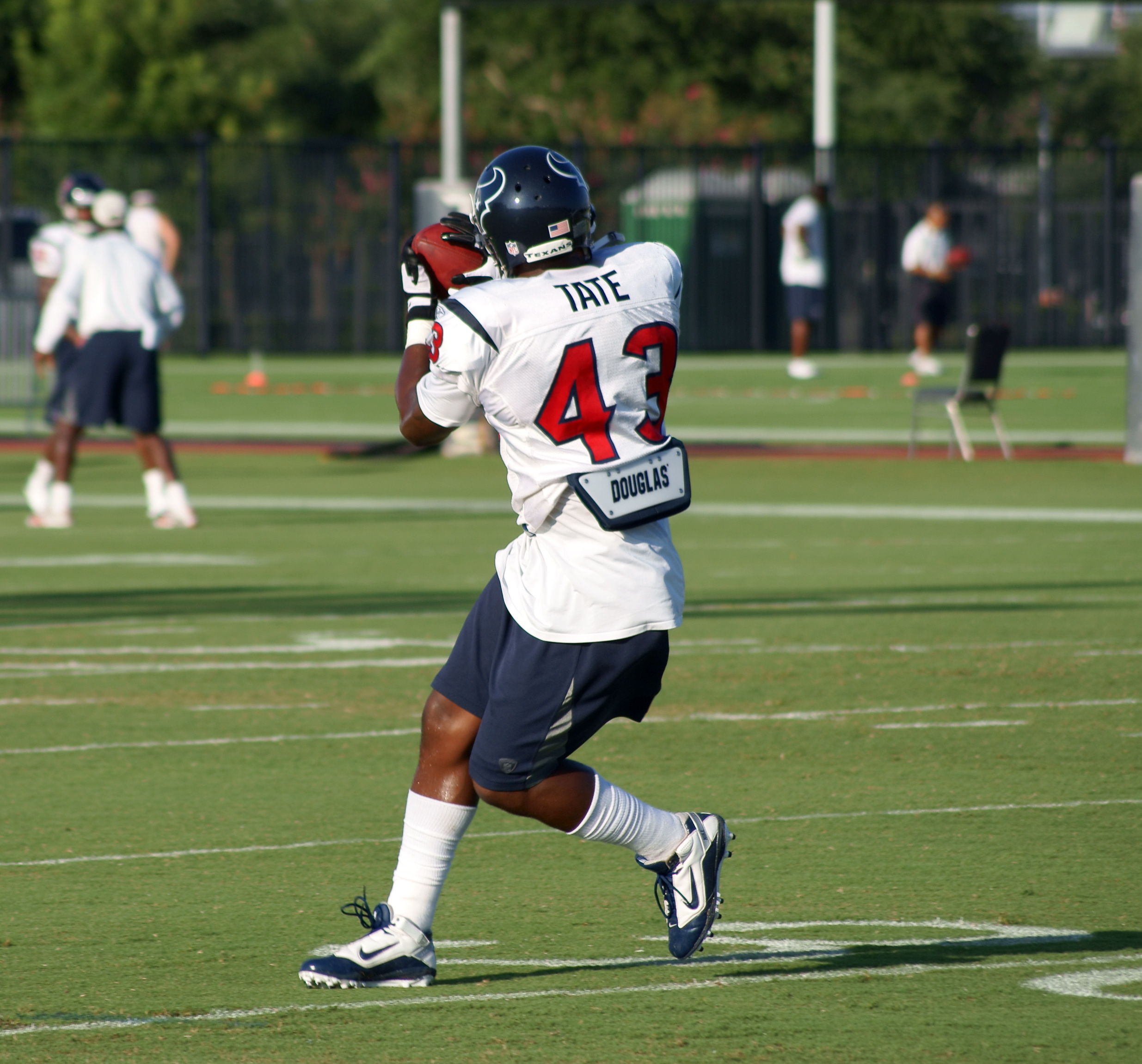
Tate with the Houston Texans in 2010

Tate had high expectations to help a Texans running game that was one of the worst in the league the previous season, but during the Texans pre-season opener in 2010, Tate broke his ankle and was placed on injured reserve (IR).

Tate returned healthy for the 2011 season, but was initially placed fourth on the depth chart behind 2010 NFL rushing champion Arian Foster, Derrick Ward, and Steve Slaton. At the conclusion of the preseason, Tate was listed as the opening-day backup to Ward due to a hamstring injury to Foster. In his NFL debut, Tate did not disappoint, rushing for 116 yards and his first NFL touchdown on 24 carries. He followed that performance the following week against the Miami Dolphins with another 100-yard game, finishing with 103 yards on 23 carries. He finished the 2011 regular season with 942 rushing yards on 175 attempts (a 5.4 yards-per-carry average, third-highest in the NFL) with 4 rushing touchdowns and 98 total receiving yards in 15 games played, two of which he started (Week 3 against the New Orleans Saints, and week 17 against the Tennessee Titans). Tate ran for 115 yards against the Cleveland Browns in Week 9 while Arian Foster ran for 124 yards in the same contest, leading the Texans to 261 yards on the ground, a franchise record.

Tate played in 11 games in the 2012 season, amassing 279 rushing yards on 65 carries, averaging 4.3 yards per carry. While his per-carry average remained formidable, his carries were limited due to a competitive Houston Texans' backfield along with lingering injuries to his hamstring and foot. It was a frustrating season for the young running back, who had been competing with emerging running back Justin Forsett for backup duties to Arian Foster.

In 2013, Tate appeared in 14 games with the Texans, making 7 starts, after a season-ending injury to Arian Foster. Tate responded by rushing for 771 yards and 4 touchdowns, 3 of which came in a Week 13 game against the New England Patriots where he rushed for a season-high 102 yards. After having battled cracked ribs for much of the season, Tate was placed on injured reserve on December 19, 2013, ending his season.

=== Cleveland Browns ===
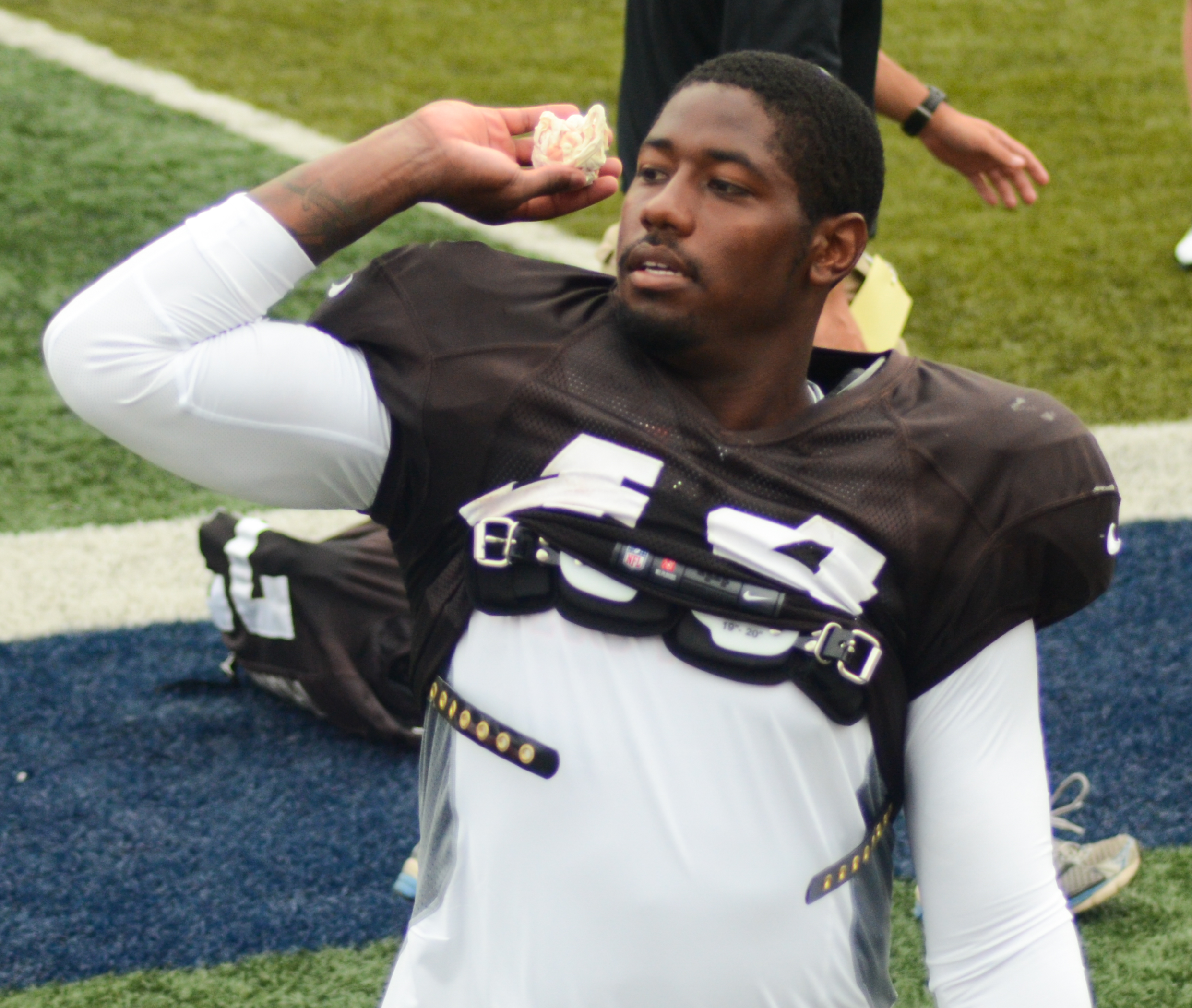
Tate with the Browns in 2014

Tate signed with the Cleveland Browns on March 15, 2014. On October 5, 2014, he ran for a career-high 123 yards on 22 carries in a 29–28 win over the Tennessee Titans.

Tate was released by the Browns on November 18, 2014. In the weeks leading up to his release, he grew frustrated with the amount of carries he was getting due to the three-back rotation system the Browns had recently employed, giving Tate, Isaiah Crowell and Terrance West fairly even playing time at running back.

=== Minnesota Vikings ===
The Minnesota Vikings were awarded Tate on waivers after his release from Cleveland. However, after playing only three games with the team, accumulating 38 rushing yards off of 13 attempts, the Vikings released Tate on December 25, 2014.

=== Pittsburgh Steelers ===
In the lead up to the 2014 NFL playoffs, the Pittsburgh Steelers lost Le'Veon Bell to injury. With no experienced running backs, they signed the newly released Tate on December 30, 2014. In the Wild Card loss against the Baltimore Ravens, Tate had five carries for 19 yards.

=== The Spring League ===
Tate participated in The Spring League in 2017.

== Career statistics ==
=== NFL ===
Season	Team	Rushing						Receiving						Fumbles	
Season	Team	GP	Att	Yds	Avg	Lng	TD	Rec	Tgts	Yds	Avg	Lng	TD	Fum	Lost
~2010	HOU	-	-	-	-	-	-	-	-	-	-	-	-	-	-
2011	HOU	15	175	942	5.4	56	4	13	19	98	7.5	14	0	4	3
2012	HOU	11	65	279	4.3	25	2	11	11	49	4.5	11	0	1	1
2013	HOU	14	181	771	4.3	60	4	34	51	140	4.1	10	0	5	2
2014	CLE	8	106	333	3.1	25	4	9	12	60	6.7	23	0	0	0
2014	MIN	3	13	38	2.9	9	0	0	0	0	0.0	0	0	0	0
	Total	51	540	2,363	4.4	60	14	67	93	347	5.2	23	0	10	6

~placed on IR in preseason
All statistics from espn.com

=== College ===
Season	Team	Rushing						Receiving					Kickoffs			
Season	Team	GP	Att	Yds	Avg	Lng	TD	Rec	Yds	Avg	Lng	TD	KR	Yds	TD	Lng
~2006	AUB	9	54	392	7.3	42	3	2	-3	-1.5	2	0	2	36	0	24
~2007	AUB	13	202	903	4.5	44	8	16	144	9.0	25	0	1	11	0	11
2008	AUB	12	159	664	4.2	49	3	15	90	6.0	27	0	5	139	0	36
~2009	AUB	13	263	1,362	5.2	60	10	20	105	5.3	19	0	0	0	0	0
	Total	47	678	3,321	4.9	60	24	53	336	5.0	27	0	8	186	0	36

~ includes bowl game
