= Darvin Adams =

American gridiron football player (born 1990)

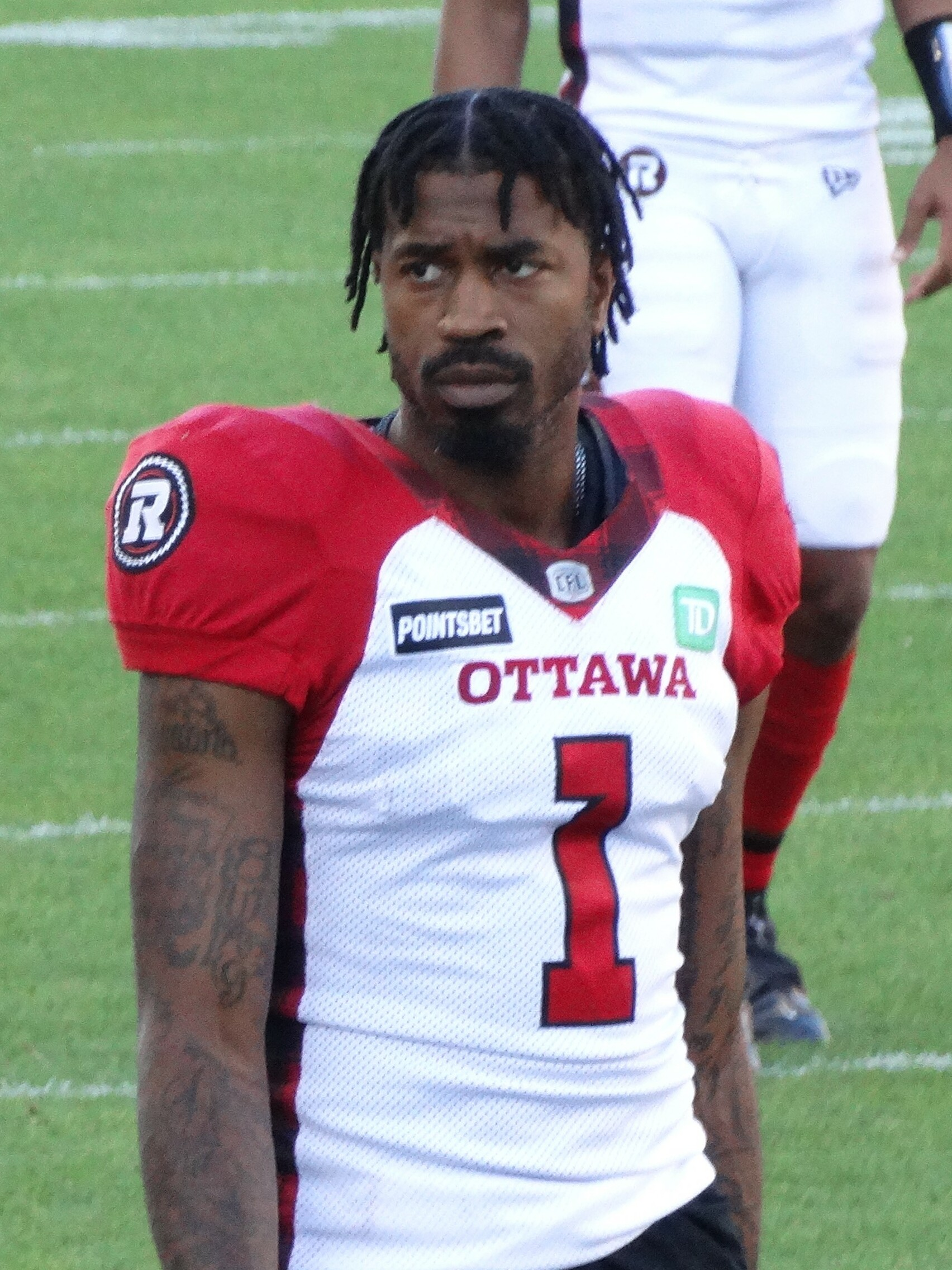
- Adams with the Ottawa Redblacks in 2022

Profile
- Position: Wide receiver

Personal information
- Born: January 5, 1990 (age 36); Canton, Mississippi, U.S.
- Listed height: 6 ft 3 in (1.91 m)
- Listed weight: 185 lb (84 kg)

Career information
- High school: Harrison (Kennesaw, Georgia)
- College: Auburn

Career history
- 2011: Carolina Panthers
- 2012: Virginia Destroyers
- 2013–2014: Toronto Argonauts
- 2015–2021: Winnipeg Blue Bombers
- 2022: Ottawa Redblacks

Awards and highlights
- 2× Grey Cup champion (2019, 2021); 2× CFL West All-Star (2017, 2018); BCS national champion (2011); Outback Bowl MVP (2010)

Career CFL statistics
- Receptions: 406
- Receiving yards: 5,885
- Receiving touchdowns: 42
- Stats at Pro Football Reference
- Stats at CFL.ca

Darvin Adams (born January 5, 1990) is an American professional football wide receiver. Adams is a two-time Canadian Football League (CFL) champion, winning the 107th Grey Cup and 108th Grey Cup as part of the Winnipeg Blue Bombers. First signed by the Carolina Panthers as an undrafted free agent in 2011, Adams was also a member of the Virginia Destroyers, Toronto Argonauts, and Ottawa Redblacks. He played college football at Auburn, with whom he won the 2011 BCS National Championship.

== Early life ==
Adams attended Harrison High School in Kennesaw, Georgia where he had 15 touchdown receptions and five rushing touchdowns as a junior. He fractured his left arm in an all-star game. He had 66 catches for 867 yards and 11 touchdowns as a senior, 106 tackles and two interceptions. He received an Honorable Mention Class AAAAA All-State team as a senior and was selected to play in the Cobb County All-Star Senior Bowl. Tommy Tuberville said of his recruit, "Darvin Adams is an excellent outside receiver. He’s got height and speed and should be very good in this offense."

== College career ==
During the 2009 season with Auburn he had 60 receptions for 997 yards and 10 touchdowns.

Adams was named Most Valuable Player of the January 1, 2010 Outback Bowl, with 12 receptions for 142 yards in Auburn's 38–35 victory. During the 2010 SEC Championship Game, Auburn won the Southeastern Conference and Adams broke the SEC Championship Game record for receiving yards with 217. On January 17, 2011, Auburn University announced Adams' decision to skip his senior year and declare for the NFL draft, in which he went undrafted.

== Professional career ==
=== Carolina Panthers ===
He was signed as an undrafted rookie free agent by the Carolina Panthers on July 30, 2011, but was released on September 3 during final cuts. He spent time on the team's practice squad before he was promoted to the active roster on November 25, 2011.

=== Virginia Destroyers ===
In 2012, Adams played in four games for the Virginia Destroyers of the United Football League.

=== Toronto Argonauts ===
On January 28, 2013, Adams signed with the Toronto Argonauts of the Canadian Football League. He spent two years with the club, playing in 11 games and starting eight. He caught 18 passes for 237 yards and one touchdown.

=== Winnipeg Blue Bombers ===
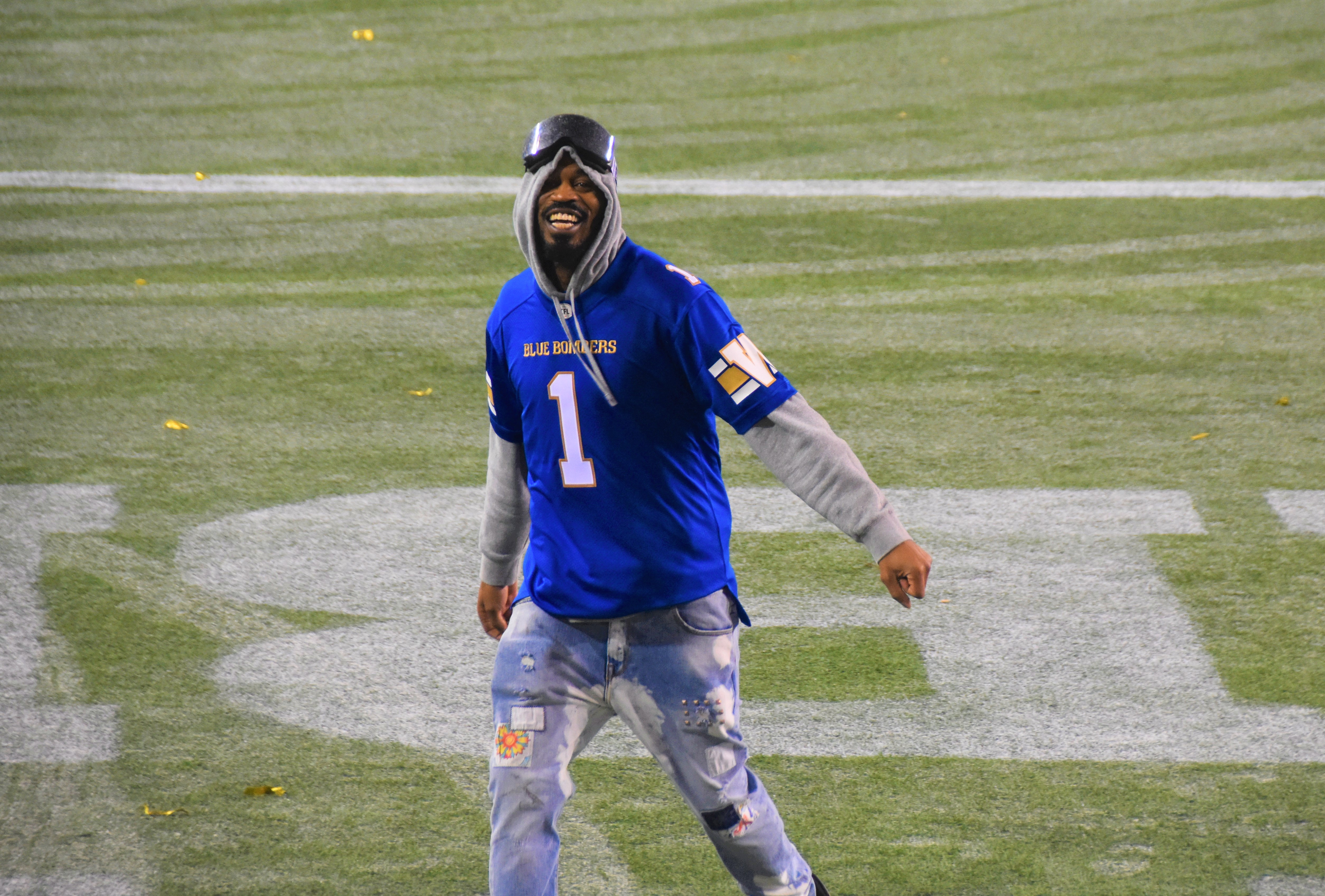
Adams at the 2021 Grey Cup Celebration.

Upon entering free agency, Adams signed with the Winnipeg Blue Bombers on February 10, 2015. Adams was one of the Bombers leading receivers in 2015, catching 61 passes for 839. yards with 6 touchdowns. Adams missed 12 games during the 2016 season with a shoulder injury, returning to the starting lineup for the second last week of the regular season. On January 16, 2017 the Bombers and Adams agreed to a three-year contract extension, preventing him from becoming a free-agent about a month later. Over the following two seasons Adams continued to be the Bombers leading receiver, eclipsing 1,000 yards in both seasons.

Adams helped the Bombers to reach post-season once again during the 2019 season. In the division semi-finals he grabbed a critical 71-yard touchdown to help the Bombers upset the Calgary Stampeders on the road. Zach Collaros again hit Adams for a long gain in the playoffs in their away game against Saskatchewan, when they connected for 63 yards on one play, helping the team to the Grey Cup. Adams would have a quieter game in the 107th Grey Cup, though he did have a pass to Chris Streveler on a trick play, as the Blue Bombers would eventually win to get their first championship in 29 years.

The following season was cancelled as a result of the COVID-19 pandemic, though Adams would return to the team for the 2021 season. Adams again would see his total yards diminish as teammate Kenny Lawler led the team and CFL in receiving yards. Adams would still finish the season with 441 yards and four touchdowns as the Blue Bombers would finish the year with the best regular season record. Winnipeg would go on to their second consecutive final when the defeated Saskatchewan again to go to the 108th Grey Cup. There, the Blue Bombers would trail for much of the game but would rally from 22 to 10 down to force overtime. Tied at 25, Winnipeg got possession first and Adams caught a touchdown pass from Collaros that would end up the game winner as Adams and the Blue Bombers won their second consecutive championship by a score of 33-25. He became a free agent upon the expiry of his contract on February 8, 2022.

=== Ottawa Redblacks ===
On February 8, 2022, it was announced that Adams had signed with the Ottawa Redblacks. In his first season in Ottawa he played in all 18 regular season games for the first time in his career, catching 63 passes for 949 yards with two touchdowns. His contract is set to expire in February 2023. On February 14, 2023, Adams became a free agent.

== Statistics ==
Receiving		Regular season						Playoffs
Year	Team	Games	Rec	Yards	Avg	Long	TD	Games	Rec	Yards	Avg	Long	TD
2013	TOR	1	3	24	8.0	11	1	Team did not qualify
2014	TOR	10	18	237	13.2	45	1	Team did not qualify
2015	WPG	16	61	839	13.8	79	6	Team did not qualify
2016	WPG	8	51	690	13.5	63	6	1	3	43	14.3	22	0
2017	WPG	15	76	1120	14.7	75	7	DNP injured
2018	WPG	17	61	1028	16.9	72	10	2	8	93	11.6	26	0
2019	WPG	13	47	549	11.7	43	5	3	8	209	26.1	71	1
2020	WPG	Season cancelled						Season cancelled
2021	WPG	11	26	441	17.0	52	4	1	2	42	21.0	29	0
2022	OTT	18	63	949	15.1	50	2	Team did not qualify
CFL totals		109	406	5,877	14.5	79	42	7	21	387	18.4	71	1
