= Demond Washington =

American gridiron football player (born 1987)

No. 24
- Position: Defensive back/return specialist

Personal information
- Born: September 30, 1987 (age 39); Montgomery, Alabama, U.S.
- Listed height: 5 ft 9 in (1.75 m)
- Listed weight: 178 lb (81 kg)

Career information
- High school: Tallassee (Al), Mississippi Gulf CC
- College: Auburn

Career history
- 2011: Kansas City Chiefs*
- 2012–2015: Winnipeg Blue Bombers
- 2016–2018: Hamilton Tiger-Cats
- * Offseason or practice squad member only
- Stats at CFL.ca

Demond Washington (born September 30, 1987) is an American former professional football defensive back who played in the Canadian Football League (CFL).

Washington signed with the Winnipeg Blue Bombers on April 24, 2012, as a free agent, after spending time with the Kansas City Chiefs in 2011 as one of their final preseason cuts. He signed with the Hamilton Tiger-Cats on February 10, 2016.
