= Corey Wootton =

American football player (born 1987)

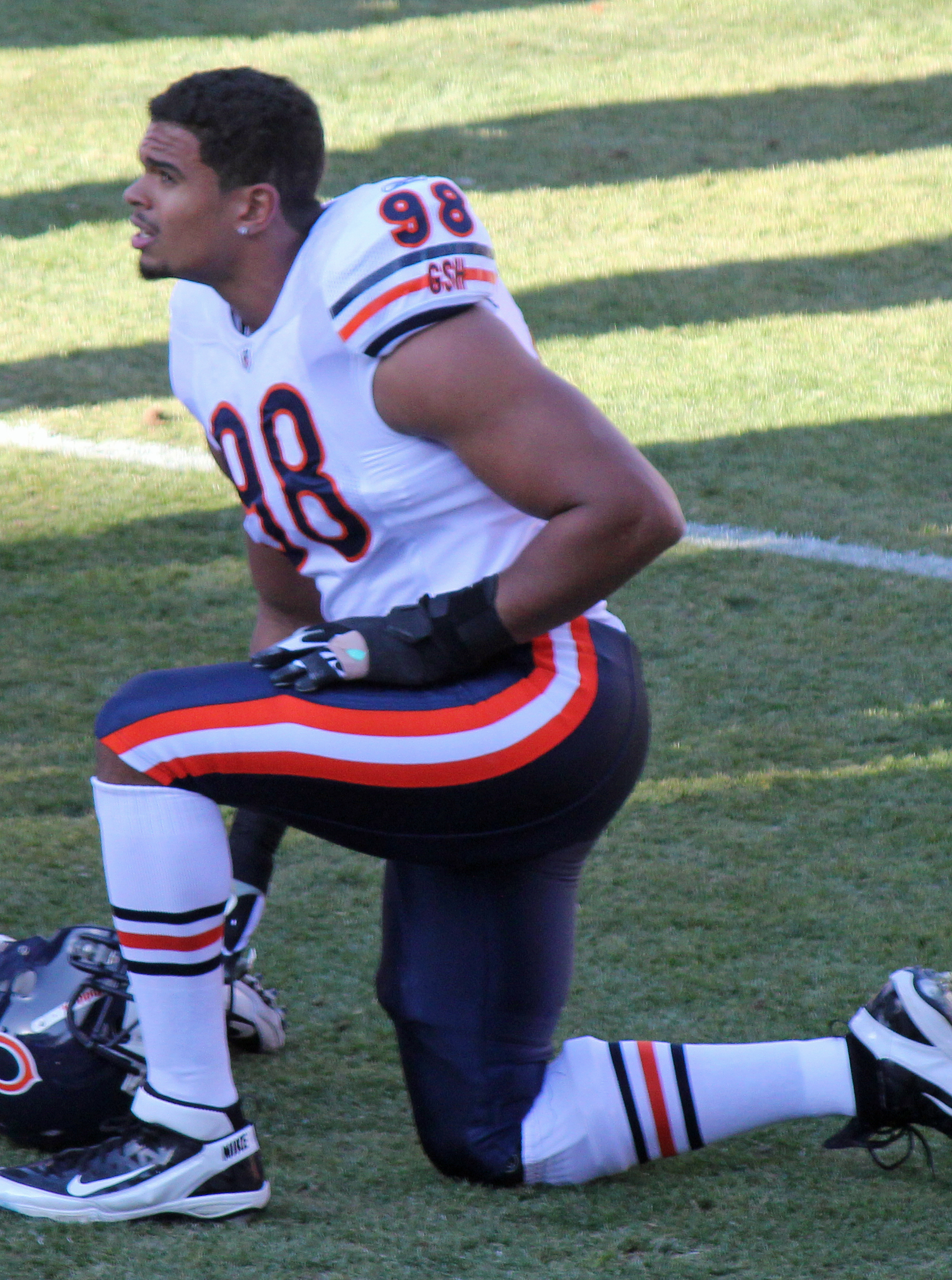
- Wootton with the Chicago Bears in 2011

No. 98, 99
- Position: Defensive end

Personal information
- Born: June 22, 1987 (age 39); Rutherford, New Jersey, U.S.
- Listed height: 6 ft 6 in (1.98 m)
- Listed weight: 270 lb (122 kg)

Career information
- High school: Don Bosco Prep (Ramsey, New Jersey)
- College: Northwestern
- NFL draft: 2010: 4th round, 109th overall pick

Career history
- Chicago Bears (2010–2013); Minnesota Vikings (2014); Detroit Lions (2015)

Awards and highlights
- Freshman All-American (2006); First-team All-Big Ten (2008); Northwestern's Most Valuable Player (2008); Sporting News Freshman All-Big Ten team (2006)

Career NFL statistics
- Total tackles: 86
- Sacks: 12.0
- Forced fumbles: 3
- Fumble recoveries: 2
- Defensive touchdowns: 1
- Stats at Pro Football Reference

Corey Andrew Wootton (born June 22, 1987) is an American former professional football player who was a defensive end in the National Football League (NFL). He played college football for the Northwestern Wildcats. As a junior, he garnered first-team All-Big Ten Conference honors. He was selected by the Chicago Bears in the fourth round of the 2010 NFL draft. He has also played for the Minnesota Vikings and Detroit Lions.

== Early life ==
Born in Rutherford, New Jersey, Wootton played high school football at Don Bosco Preparatory High School in Ramsey, New Jersey.

== College career ==
Wootton chose Northwestern over Connecticut, Louisville and NC State. During his freshman season, Wootton got a medical hardship year for 2005 and only played in three of first four games before being sidelined the remainder of the year with a neck injury.

In 2006, he was the first Northwestern player since Hudhaifa Ismaeli (1995) to accomplish every major defensive statistic in a single season and the team's seventh-leading tackler and leader in sacks and leader in tackles for loss. At the end of the season, Wootton earned a Football Writers Association of America (FWAA) Freshman All-American selection and was named to the Sporting News Freshman All-Big Ten team.

In 2007, Wootton finished second on the team with 7.0 tackles for loss and five pass deflections and second among defensive linemen with 39 tackles.

== Professional career ==
=== Chicago Bears ===
Wootton entered the 2010 NFL draft and was selected 109th overall in the fourth round by the Chicago Bears. During a game against the Minnesota Vikings on December 20, 2010, Wootton recorded his first career sack where he brought down quarterback Brett Favre. The sack forced Favre to leave the game due to a concussion. The concussion eventually sidelined Favre for the remaining two games of his final season in the NFL. In Week 9 of 2012 against the Tennessee Titans, Wootton scored his first career touchdown off a blocked punt, which had been blocked by former Northwestern teammate Sherrick McManis. Wootton ended the 2012 season appearing in all 16 games with seven starts and seven sacks.

In 2013, after injuries sustained to Henry Melton and Nate Collins, Wootton was shifted to defensive tackle in week five against the New Orleans Saints.

=== Minnesota Vikings ===
On March 20, 2014, it was reported Wootton had signed a one-year deal with the Minnesota Vikings.

=== Detroit Lions ===
On May 14, 2015, Wootton signed a one-year deal with the Detroit Lions.

=== Retirement ===
On July 26, 2016, Wootton announced on Twitter that he was retiring from the NFL after playing six seasons.

Following his retirement, Wootton provides football coverage for Fox Chicago and the Big Ten Network.
