= Chris Todd (American football) =

American football player (born 1986)

Personal information
- Born: February 4, 1986 (age 40); Elizabethtown, Kentucky, U.S.
- Listed height: 6 ft 4 in (1.93 m)
- Listed weight: 217 lb (98 kg)

Career information
- High school: Elizabethtown High School; Elizabethtown, Kentucky
- College: Texas Tech (2005–2006); Hutchinson Community College (2007); Auburn (2008–2009)

Awards and highlights
- 2008 SEC Offensive Newcomer of the Year; 2009 First Team All-SEC
- Stats at ESPN

Chris Todd (born February 4, 1986) was an American college football quarterback for the Auburn Tigers in 2008 and 2009. He was Auburn's starting quarterback for part of the 2008 season and for the entire 2009 season. He set all-time Auburn school records for most touchdown passes in a season and for the longest pass in school history. He also tied the Auburn single-game record with five touchdown passes against Ball State in 2009.

== Early life ==
Todd played high school football at Elizabethtown High School in Elizabethtown, Kentucky. During his high school football career, he passed for 10,776 yards and 120 touchdowns. In 2005, he led Elizabethtown to its first state final in 24 years, as he passed for 3,180 yards and 38 touchdowns.

Todd began his college football career at Texas Tech, where he redshirted in 2005 and appeared in five games in 2006. In 2007, he played at a junior college.

== Auburn ==
=== 2008 season ===
In 2008, Todd joined the Auburn Tigers football team as a junior college transfer student. He gained 248 yards and national media attention for his first career start at Auburn in September 2008. Todd appeared in seven games for Auburn in 2008, including five as the team's starting quarterback.

=== 2009 season ===
On August 13, 2009, Todd was named the starter for the 2009 season. During the 2009 season, he cemented his name into the Auburn record books. In the season opener against Louisiana Tech, Todd connected with wide receiver Terrell Zachary on a 93-yard touchdown strike, which at the time was the longest offensive play in Auburn football history (Cam Newton would connect with receiver Emory Blake on a 94-yard pass during the 2010 season). In mid-September, he threw four touchdown passes to lead Auburn to a 41–30 victory over West Virginia. The following week against Ball State, Todd threw for 284 yards and five touchdowns, with the five touchdowns tying the Auburn single game record for most passing touchdowns in one game. Todd also set the single-season record at Auburn with 22 touchdown passes and finished the season with 2,612 passing yards and a passer rating of 145.73, ranking him 18th in the nation.
