= Walter McFadden =

American football player (born 1987)

No. 22
- Position: Cornerback

Personal information
- Born: January 21, 1987 (age 39); Hollywood, Florida, U.S.
- Listed height: 5 ft 10 in (1.78 m)
- Listed weight: 180 lb (82 kg)

Career information
- High school: Blanche Ely (Pompano Beach, Florida)
- College: Auburn
- NFL draft: 2010: 5th round, 138th overall pick

Career history
- Oakland Raiders (2010); Jacksonville Jaguars (2011)*; Cincinnati Bengals (2011)*; Pittsburgh Steelers (2012)*
- * Offseason or practice squad member only

Awards and highlights
- Second-team All-SEC (2009)

Career NFL statistics
- Total tackles: 6
- Stats at Pro Football Reference

Walter McFadden Jr. (born January 21, 1987) is an American former professional football player who was a cornerback in the National Football League (NFL). He was selected by the Oakland Raiders in the fifth round of the 2010 NFL draft. He played college football for the Auburn Tigers and high school football at Ely High School in Pompano Beach, Florida.

== Professional career ==
Pre-draft measurables
Height	Weight	40-yard dash	10-yard split	20-yard split	20-yard shuttle	Three-cone drill	Vertical jump	Broad jump	Bench press
5 ft 10 in (1.78 m)	181 lb (82 kg)	4.39 s	1.54 s	2.58 s	4.28 s	6.90 s	35.5 in (0.90 m)	10 ft 3 in (3.12 m)	5 reps
All values from Pro Day

=== Oakland Raiders ===
He was selected by Oakland Raiders in the fifth round (138th overall) of the 2010 NFL draft. He was released by the Raiders on September 3, 2011.

=== Jacksonville Jaguars ===
On October 18, 2011, he was signed to the Jacksonville Jaguars practice squad.

=== Cincinnati Bengals ===
On November 15, 2011, he signed to the Cincinnati Bengals practice squad. On November 22, 2011, he was released by the Bengals after seven days being signed.

=== Pittsburgh Steelers ===
On January 20, 2012, McFadden was signed by the Pittsburgh Steelers. He was released August 27, 2012, and was re-signed to the practice squad on December 26, 2012.

== Personal life ==
He is the younger brother of NFL cornerback Bryant McFadden and cousin of Patrick Peterson. He married his longtime college girlfriend Brandi Means in July 2012.
