= Illinois Fighting Illini football statistical leaders =

The Illinois Fighting Illini football statistical leaders are individual statistical leaders of the Illinois Fighting Illini football program in various categories, including passing, rushing, receiving, total offense, defensive stats, and kicking. Within those areas, the lists identify single-game, single-season, and career leaders. The Fighting Illini represent the University of Illinois at Urbana–Champaign in the NCAA's Big Ten Conference.

Although Illinois began competing in intercollegiate football in 1890, the school's official record book generally does not include statistics from before the 1950s, as records from before this year are often incomplete and inconsistent. An exception to this is Red Grange, who appears several times on these lists despite playing in the 1920s.

These lists are dominated by more recent players for several reasons:

- Since the 1950s, seasons have increased from 10 games to 11 and then 12 games in length.
- The NCAA didn't allow freshmen to play varsity football until 1972 (with the exception of the World War II years), allowing players to have four-year careers.
- Bowl games only began counting toward single-season and career statistics in 2002. The Fighting Illini have played in 4 bowl games since then, all since 2008, giving recent players an extra game to accumulate statistics.

These lists are updated through Week 12 of the 2026 season. All active players are listed in bold.

== Passing ==
=== Passing yards ===
Career
Rank	Player	Yards	Years
1	Jack Trudeau	8,725	1981 1983 1984 1985
2	Kurt Kittner	8,722	1998 1999 2000 2001
3	Nathan Scheelhaase	8,568	2010 2011 2012 2013
4	Juice Williams	8,037	2006 2007 2008 2009
5	Luke Altmyer	7,607	2023 2024 2025
6	Jason Verduzco	7,532	1989 1990 1991 1992
7	Tony Eason	7,031	1981 1982
8	Wes Lunt	5,900	2014 2015 2016
9	Johnny Johnson	5,293	1992 1993 1994 1995
10	Jon Beutjer	5,190	2002 2003 2004

Single season
Rank	Player	Yards	Year
1	Tony Eason	3,671	1982
2	Tony Eason	3,360	1981
3	Jack Trudeau	3,339	1985
4	Nathan Scheelhaase	3,272	2013
5	Kurt Kittner	3,256	2001
6	Juice Williams	3,173	2008
7	Dave Wilson	3,154	1980
8	Jason Verduzco	3,014	1991
9	Luke Altmyer	3,007	2025
10	Wes Lunt	2,761	2015

Single game
Rank	Player	Yards	Year	Opponent
1	Dave Wilson	621	1980	Ohio State
2	John Paddock	507	2023	Indiana
3	Tony Eason	479	1982	Wisconsin
4	Juice Williams	462	2008	Minnesota
5	Wes Lunt	456	2014	Western Kentucky
6	Juice Williams	451	2008	Missouri
7	Nathan Scheelhaase	450	2013	Indiana
8	Jason Verduzco	431	1991	Missouri
9	Jon Beutjer	430	2003	California
10	Jon Beutjer	426	2002	San Jose State

=== Passing touchdowns ===
Career
Rank	Player	TDs	Years
1	Kurt Kittner	70	1998 1999 2000 2001
2	Luke Altmyer	57	2023 2024 2025
3	Juice Williams	56	2006 2007 2008 2009
4	Jack Trudeau	55	1981 1983 1984 1985
	Nathan Scheelhaase	55	2010 2011 2012 2013
6	Jason Verduzco	42	1989 1990 1991 1992
7	Jon Beutjer	39	2002 2003 2004
8	Tony Eason	38	1981 1982
9	Wes Lunt	36	2014 2015 2016
10	Johnny Johnson	35	1992 1993 1994 1995

Single season
Rank	Player	TDs	Year
1	Kurt Kittner	27	2001
2	Kurt Kittner	24	1999
3	Jeff George	22	1989
	Juice Williams	22	2008
	Luke Altmyer	22	2024
	Luke Altmyer	22	2025
7	Jon Beutjer	21	2002
	Nathan Scheelhaase	21	2013
9	Tony Eason	20	1981
	**Katin Houser**	20	2026

Single game
Rank	Player	TDs	Year	Opponent
1	Dave Wilson	6	1980	Ohio State
2	Tom O'Connell	5	1952	Washington
	Jeff George	5	1989	Indiana
	Juice Williams	5	2008	Missouri
	Reilly O'Toole	5	2012	Charleston Southern
	Nathan Scheelhaase	5	2013	Miami (Ohio)

== Rushing ==
=== Rushing yards ===
Career
Rank	Player	Yards	Years
1	Robert Holcombe	4,105	1994 1995 1996 1997
2	Chase Brown	3,206	2019 2020 2021 2022
3	Antoineo Harris	2,985	1999 2000 2001 2002
4	Thomas Rooks	2,887	1982 1983 1984 1985
5	Jim Grabowski	2,878	1963 1964 1965
6	Rocky Harvey	2,711	1998 1999 2000 2001
7	Josh Ferguson	2,586	2011 2012 2013 2014 2015
8	Juice Williams	2,557	2006 2007 2008 2009
	Mikel Leshoure	2,557	2008 2009 2010
10	Pierre Thomas	2,545	2003 2004 2005 2006

Single season
Rank	Player	Yards	Year
1	Mikel Leshoure	1,697	2010
2	Rashard Mendenhall	1,681	2007
3	Chase Brown	1,643	2022
4	Antoineo Harris	1,330	2002
5	Robert Holcombe	1,281	1996
6	Jim Grabowski	1,258	1965
7	J.C. Caroline	1,256	1953
8	Robert Holcombe	1,253	1997
9	Keith Jones	1,196	1988
10	Howard Griffith	1,115	1990

Single game
Rank	Player	Yards	Year	Opponent
1	Mikel Leshoure	330	2010	Northwestern
2	Robert Holcombe	315	1996	Minnesota
3	Howard Griffith	263	1990	Northwestern
4	Chase Brown	257	2021	Charlotte
5	Jim Grabowski	239	1964	Wisconsin
6	Red Grange	237	1925	Pennsylvania
7	Chase Brown	223	2021	Penn State
8	Rocky Harvey	215	1998	Middle Tennessee
9	Rashard Mendenhall	214	2007	Indiana
10	Red Grange	212	1924	Michigan

=== Rushing touchdowns ===
Career
Rank	Player	TDs	Years
1	Howard Griffith	31	1987 1988 1989 1990
2	Jason Ford	26	2008 2009 2010 2011
3	Thomas Rooks	25	1982 1983 1984 1985
	Robert Holcombe	25	1994 1995 1996 1997
5	Johnny Karras	24	1949 1950 1951
	Jim Grabowski	24	1963 1964 1965
	Chubby Phillips	24	1973 1974 1975 1976
8	Red Grange	23	1923 1924 1925
	Ty Douthard	23	1993 1994 1995 1996
	Mikel Leshoure	23	2008 2009 2010

Single season
Rank	Player	TDs	Year
1	Rashard Mendenhall	17	2007
	Mikel Leshoure	17	2010
3	Howard Griffith	15	1990
4	Johnny Karras	13	1951
5	Red Grange	12	1924
	Robert Holcombe	12	1996
7	Keith Jones	11	1988
8	Jim Grabowski	10	1964
	Steve Havard	10	1999
	Chase Brown	10	2022
	Josh McCray	10	2024

Single game
Rank	Player	TDs	Year	Opponent
1	Howard Griffith	8	1990	Southern Illinois
2	Red Grange	4	1924	Michigan
	Antoineo Harris	4	2002	Indiana

== Receiving ==
=== Receptions ===
Career
Rank	Player	Rec	Years
1	David Williams	262	1983 1984 1985
2	Isaiah Williams	214	2019 2021 2022 2023
3	Josh Ferguson	197	2011 2012 2013 2014
4	Jason Dulick	169	1993 1994 1995 1996
5	A. J. Jenkins	167	2008 2009 2010 2011
6	Brandon Lloyd	160	1999 2000 2001 2002
7	John Wright	159	1965 1966 1967
	Arrelious Benn	159	2007 2008 2009
9	Walter Young	147	1999 2000 2001 2002
10	Mike Martin	143	1979 1980 1981 1982

Single season
Rank	Player	Rec	Year
1	David Williams	101	1984
2	David Williams	92	1985
3	A. J. Jenkins	90	2011
4	Isaiah Williams	82	2022
	Isaiah Williams	82	2023
6	**Collin Dixon**	80	2026
7	Mike Martin	77	1982
8	Mike Dudek	76	2014
9	Hank Beatty	70	2025
10	David Williams	69	1983

Single game
Rank	Player	Rec	Year	Opponent
1	David Williams	16	1985	Purdue
2	Keith Jones	13	1988	Michigan State
	Steve Hull	13	2013	Northwestern
	Isaiah Williams	13	2023	Minnesota
5	Mike Martin	12	1982	Ohio State
	David Williams	12	1984	Michigan
	Kameno Bell	12	1991	Ohio State
	Brandon Lloyd	12	2001	Northwestern
	Arrelious Benn	12	2008	Minnesota
	A. J. Jenkins	12	2011	Northwestern

=== Receiving yards ===
Career
Rank	Player	Yards	Years
1	David Williams	3,392	1983 1984 1985
2	Brandon Lloyd	2,583	1999 2000 2001 2002
3	A. J. Jenkins	2,432	2008 2009 2010 2011
4	Walter Young	2,382	1999 2000 2001 2002
5	Isaiah Williams	2,304	2019 2021 2022 2023
6	Mike Martin	2,300	1979 1980 1981 1982
7	John Wright	2,284	1965 1966 1967
8	Arrelious Benn	2,221	2007 2008 2009
9	Pat Bryant	2,095	2021 2022 2023 2024
10	Jason Dulick	2,004	1993 1994 1995 1996

Single season
Rank	Player	Yards	Year
1	David Williams	1,278	1984
2	A. J. Jenkins	1,276	2011
3	David Williams	1,156	1985
4	**Collin Dixon**	1,088	2026
5	Mike Martin	1,068	1982
6	Brandon Lloyd	1,062	2001
7	Arrelious Benn	1,055	2008
	Isaiah Williams	1,055	2023
9	Mike Dudek	1,038	2014
10	Brandon Lloyd	1,010	2002

Single game
Rank	Player	Yards	Year	Opponent
1	A. J. Jenkins	268	2011	Northwestern
2	Steve Hull	224	2013	Indiana
3	Casey Washington	218	2023	Northwestern
4	David Williams	208	1984	Northwestern
5	Mike Dudek	200	2014	Purdue
	Isaiah Williams	200	2023	Indiana
7	Pat Bryant	197	2024	Rutgers
8	Mike Sherrod	191	1980	Indiana
9	Rex Smith	188	1952	Iowa
	David Williams	188	1983	Minnesota

=== Receiving touchdowns ===
Career
Rank	Player	TDs	Years
1	David Williams	24	1983 1984 1985
2	Brandon Lloyd	21	1999 2000 2001 2002
3	Pat Bryant	19	2021 2022 2023 2024
	A. J. Jenkins	19	2008 2009 2010 2011
5	**Collin Dixon**	18	2024 2025 2026
6	Mike Martin	15	1980 1981 1982
	Jason Dulick	15	1993 1994 1995 1996
	Walter Young	15	1999 2000 2001 2002
9	Isaiah Williams	14	2019 2021 2022 2023
10	John Wright	12	1965 1966 1967
	Oliver Williams	12	1981 1982
	Shawn Wax	12	1988 1989 1990
	Greg Lewis	12	1999 2000 2001 2002
	Josh Imatorbhebhe	12	2019 2020

Single season
Rank	Player	TDs	Year
1	**Collin Dixon**	13	2026
2	Pat Bryant	10	2024
	David Williams	10	1985
	Brandon Lloyd	10	2001
5	Brandon Lloyd	9	2002
	Josh Imatorbhebhe	9	2019
7	Randy Grant	8	1984
	David Williams	8	1984
	Mike Bellamy	8	1989
	Walter Young	8	2001
	A. J. Jenkins	8	2011

Single game
Rank	Player	TDs	Year	Opponent
1	David Williams	3	1985	Purdue
	Mike Bellamy	3	1989	Indiana
	Shawn Wax	3	1990	Iowa
	Gus Palma	3	1991	Houston
	Greg Lewis	3	2000	Middle Tennessee
	A. J. Jenkins	3	2011	Northwestern
	Casey Washington	3	2023	Northwestern
	Collin Dixon	3	2026	Duke

== Total offense ==
Total offense is the sum of passing and rushing statistics. It does not include receiving or returns.

=== Total offense yards ===
Career
Rank	Player	Yards	Years
1	Nathan Scheelhaase	10,634	2010 2011 2012 2013
2	Juice Williams	10,594	2006 2007 2008 2009
3	Kurt Kittner	8,880	1998 1999 2000 2001
4	Jack Trudeau	8,640	1981 1983 1984 1985
5	Luke Altmyer	8,348	2023 2024 2025
6	Jason Verduzco	7,256	1989 1990 1991 1992
7	Tony Eason	7,002	1981 1982
8	Wes Lunt	5,602	2014 2015 2016
9	Johnny Johnson	5,358	1992 1993 1994 1995
10	Jon Beutjer	5,158	2002 2003 2004

Single season
Rank	Player	Yards	Year
1	Juice Williams	3,892	2008
2	Tony Eason	3,671	1982
3	Nathan Scheelhaase	3,543	2013
4	Tony Eason	3,331	1981
5	Jack Trudeau	3,321	1985
6	Luke Altmyer	3,249	2025
7	Kurt Kittner	3,242	2001
8	Jason Verduzco	2,983	1991
9	Dave Wilson	2,960	1980
10	Luke Altmyer	2,934	2024

Single game
Rank	Player	Yards	Year	Opponent
1	Dave Wilson	585	1980	Ohio State
2	Juice Williams	503	2008	Minnesota
3	John Paddock	499	2023	Indiana
4	Nathan Scheelhaase	495	2013	Indiana
5	Tony Eason	480	1982	Wisconsin
6	Juice Williams	461	2008	Missouri
7	Tony Eason	450	1981	Northwestern
8	Jason Verduzco	445	1991	Missouri
9	Wes Lunt	439	2014	Western Kentucky
	Luke Altmyer	439	2024	Purdue

=== Total touchdowns ===
Career
Rank	Player	TDs	Years
1	Kurt Kittner	77	1998 1999 2000 2001
2	Juice Williams	74	2006 2007 2008 2009
	Nathan Scheelhaase	74	2010 2011 2012 2013
4	Luke Altmyer	69	2023 2024 2025
5	Jack Trudeau	60	1981 1983 1984 1985
6	Jason Verduzco	47	1989 1990 1991 1992
7	Tony Eason	44	1981 1982
8	Jon Beutjer	41	2002 2003 2004
9	Wes Lunt	37	2014 2015 2016
10	Johnny Johnson	36	1992 1993 1994 1995

Single season
Rank	Player	TDs	Year
1	Kurt Kittner	29	2001
2	Juice Williams	27	2008
	Luke Altmyer	27	2025
4	Luke Altmyer	26	2024
5	Tony Eason	25	1981
	Kurt Kittner	25	1999
	Nathan Scheelhaase	25	2013
8	Jon Beutjer	23	2002
9	Jeff George	22	1989
	**Katin Houser**	22	2026
	Nathan Scheelhaase	22	2010

Single game
Rank	Player	TDs	Year	Opponent
1	Howard Griffith	8	1990	Southern Illinois

== Defense ==
=== Interceptions ===
Career
Rank	Player	Ints	Years
1	Al Brosky	30	1950 1951 1952
2	Mike Gow	19	1972 1973 1974
3	George Donnelly	13	1962 1963 1964
	Mike Heaven	13	1981 1982 1983 1984
	Craig Swoope	13	1982 1983 1984 1985
6	Red Grange	11	1923 1924 1925
	Henry Jones	11	1987 1988 1989 1990
	Eugene Wilson	11	1999 2000 2001 2002
9	Phil Knell	10	1964 1965 1966 1967 1968
	Ron Bess	10	1965 1966 1967
	Trevor Starghill	10	1994 1995 1996 1997
	Sydney Brown	10	2018 2019 2020 2021 2022

Single season
Rank	Player	Ints	Year
1	Al Brosky	11	1950
	Al Brosky	11	1951
3	Mike Gow	10	1973
4	Al Brosky	8	1952
	George Donnelly	8	1964
6	Willie Osley	7	1971
7	Red Grange	6	1925
	Ron Bess	6	1967
	Terry Miller	6	1967
	Eugene Wilson	6	2001
	Sydney Brown	6	2022

Single game
Rank	Player	Ints	Year	Opponent
1	Mike Gow	4	1974	Stanford
2	Mike Gow	3	1973	Minnesota
	Phil Knell	3	1966	Purdue
	Duane Lyle	3	1995	East Carolina
	Eugene Wilson	3	2001	Penn State

=== Tackles ===
Career
Rank	Player	Tackles	Years
1	Dana Howard	595	1991 1992 1993 1994
2	John Sullivan	501	1974 1975 1976 1977 1978
3	Darrick Brownlow	483	1987 1988 1989 1990
4	John Gillen	441	1977 1978 1979 1980
5	John Holecek	436	1991 1992 1993 1994
6	Jeremy Leman	407	2004 2005 2006 2007
7	Danny Clark	381	1996 1997 1998 1999
8	Dick Butkus	374	1962 1963 1964
9	Steve Glasson	371	1986 1987 1988 1989
10	Jerry Schumacher	370	1999 2000 2001 2002

Single season
Rank	Player	Tackles	Year
1	John Sullivan	202	1977
2	Scott Studwell	177	1976
3	Darrick Brownlow	166	1988
4	Darrick Brownlow	161	1990
5	John Gillen	155	1978
6	Dele Harding	154	2019
7	Jeremy Leman	152	2006
8	Dana Howard	150	1992
	Dana Howard	150	1994
10	Dana Howard	148	1993

Single game
Rank	Player	Tackles	Year	Opponent
1	John Sullivan	34	1977	Minnesota
2	John Sullivan	27	1977	Syracuse
3	Bill Burrell	26	1959	Purdue
4	John Sullivan	25	1977	Ohio State
5	Dana Howard	24	1991	Ohio State

=== Sacks ===
Career
Rank	Player	Sacks	Years
1	Simeon Rice	44.5	1992 1993 1994 1995
2	Gabe Jacas	27.0	2022 2023 2024 2025
3	Scott Davis	23.0	1983 1984 1985 1986 1987
4	Fred Wakefield	21.0	1997 1998 1999 2000
5	Mike Poloskey	20.0	1988 1989 1990 1991
6	Moe Gardner	18.0	1987 1988 1989 1990
	Kevin Hardy	18.0	1992 1993 1994 1995
	Whitney Mercilus	18.0	2009 2010 2011
	Johnny Newton	18.0	2020 2021 2022 2023
10	Dawuane Smoot	15.5	2013 2014 2015 2016
	Owen Carney Jr.	15.5	2017 2018 2019 2020 2021

Single season
Rank	Player	Sacks	Year
1	Simeon Rice	16.0	1994
	Whitney Mercilus	16.0	2011
3	Mike Poloskey	15.0	1991
4	Simeon Rice	11.5	1995
5	Gabe Jacas	11.0	2025
6	Scott Davis	10.0	1987
7	Will Davis	9.5	2007
8	Scott Davis	9.0	1985
	Moe Gardner	9.0	1989
	Mel Agee	9.0	1989
	Simeon Rice	9.0	1992
	Fred Wakefield	9.0	2000
	Carroll Phillips	9.0	2016
	Oluwole Betiku Jr.	9.0	2019

Single game
Rank	Player	Sacks	Year	Opponent
1	Simeon Rice	5.0	1994	Washington State
2	Mike Poloskey	4.0	1991	East Carolina
	Will Davis	4.0	2007	Indiana
	Clay Nurse	4.0	2009	Minnesota
5	Jeff Weisse	3.5	1998	Middle Tennessee
	Oluwole Betiku Jr.	3.5	2019	UConn

== Kicking ==
=== Field goals made ===
Career
Rank	Player	FGs	Years
1	Chris White	53	1983 1984 1985
2	Chris Richardson	52	1991 1992 1993 1994
3	Jason Reda	51	2004 2005 2006 2007
4	Mike Bass	41	1980 1981 1982
5	Doug Higgins	39	1987 1988 1989 1990
	Derek Dimke	39	2008 2009 2010 2011
7	Dan Beaver	38	1973 1974 1975 1976
8	James McCourt	37	2019 2020 2021
	David Olano	37	2024 2025
10	Taylor Zalewski	35	2012 2013 2014 2015

Single season
Rank	Player	FGs	Year
1	Mike Bass	24	1982
	Chris White	24	1984
	Derek Dimke	24	2010
4	Neil Rackers	20	1999
	David Olano	20	2025
6	James McCourt	18	2021
7	David Olano	17	2024
8	Jason Reda	16	2007
	Taylor Zalewski	16	2015
10	Chris White	15	1985
	Jason Reda	15	2006
	Matt Eller	15	2008

Single game
Rank	Player	FGs	Year	Opponent
1	Dan Beaver	5	1973	Purdue
	Mike Bass	5	1982	Wisconsin
	Chris White	5	1984	Wisconsin
	Doug Higgins	5	1990	Michigan State
	David Olano	5	2025	Purdue

=== Field goal percentage ===
Career
Rank	Player	FG%	Years
1	David Olano	86.0%	2024 2025
2	Derek Dimke	84.8%	2008 2009 2010 2011
3	Peter Christofilakos	84.0%	1999 2000 2001 2002
4	Jason Reda	75.0%	2004 2005 2006 2007
5	Mike Bass	74.5%	1980 1981 1982
6	Caleb Griffin	74.4%	2020 2021 2022 2023
7	Chris White	73.6%	1983 1984 1985
8	Chris Richardson	71.2%	1991 1992 1993 1994
9	James McCourt	71.2%	2019 2020 2021
10	Doug Higgins	68.4%	1987 1988 1989 1990

Single season
Rank	Player	FG%	Year
1	Peter Christofilakos	92.3%	2001
2	Jason Reda	88.9%	2007
3	David Olano	87.0%	2025
4	Mike Bass	85.7%	1982
	Chris White	85.7%	1984
6	David Olano	85.0%	2024
7	Derek Dimke	83.3%	2011
8	Derek Dimke	82.8%	2010
9	Mike Wells	80.0%	1970
10	Jason Reda	78.9%	2006
