= 2002 Illinois Fighting Illini football team =

American college football season

2002 Illinois Fighting Illini football
- Conference: Big Ten Conference
- Record: 5–7 (4–4 Big Ten)
- Head coach: Ron Turner (6th season)
- Offensive scheme: Pro-style
- Defensive coordinator: Mike Cassity (2nd season)
- Base defense: 4–3
- Home stadium: Memorial Stadium

2002 Big Ten Conference football standings
	Conf.			Overall
Team	W		L	W		L
No. 1 Ohio State $#+	8	–	0	14	–	0
No. 8 Iowa %+	8	–	0	11	–	2
No. 9 Michigan	6	–	2	10	–	3
No. 16 Penn State	5	–	3	9	–	4
Purdue	4	–	4	7	–	6
Illinois	4	–	4	5	–	7
Minnesota	3	–	5	8	–	5
Wisconsin	2	–	6	8	–	6
Michigan State	2	–	6	4	–	8
Northwestern	1	–	7	3	–	9
Indiana	1	–	7	3	–	9
# – BCS National Champion; $ – BCS representative as conference champion; % – BCS at-large representative; + – Conference co-champions; Rankings from AP Poll

The 2002 Illinois Fighting Illini football team was an American football team that represented the University of Illinois at Urbana–Champaign as a member of the Big Ten Conference during the 2002 NCAA Division I-A football season. In their sixth season under Ron Turner, the Illini compiled a 5–7 record (4–4 in conference games), tied for fifth place in the Big Ten, and outscored opponents by a total of 346 to 307.

The team's statistical leaders included quarterback Jon Beutjer (2,511 passing yards), running back Anoineo Harris (1,330 rushing yards), wide receiver Brandon Lloyd (65 receptions for 1,010 yards), and kicker Peter Christofilakos (67 points scored, 40 of 40 extra points, 9 of 12 field goals).

The team played its home games at Memorial Stadium in Champaign, Illinois.

== Schedule ==
Date	Time	Opponent	Site	TV	Result	Attendance	Source
August 31	2:30 pm	vs. Missouri*	Edward Jones Dome; St. Louis, MO	ABC	L 20–33	61,876	
September 7	11:00 am	at Southern Miss*	M. M. Roberts Stadium; Hattiesburg, MS	ESPN2	L 20–23	22,183	
September 14	11:00 am	Arkansas State*	Memorial Stadium; Champaign, IL	ESPN Plus	W 59–7	46,258	
September 21	1:00 pm	San Jose State*	Memorial Stadium; Champaign, IL		L 35–38	50,990	
September 28	2:30 pm	No. 14 Michigan	Memorial Stadium; Champaign, IL (rivalry)	ABC	L 28–45	69,249	
October 3	7:00 pm	at Minnesota	Hubert H. Humphrey Metrodome; Minneapolis, MN	ESPN2	L 10–31	32,663	
October 12	12:00 pm	Purdue	Memorial Stadium; Champaign, IL		W 38–31 ^{OT}	55,590	
October 26	1:00 pm	Indiana^{†}	Memorial Stadium; Champaign, IL (rivalry)		W 45–14	50,295	
November 2	2:30 pm	at No. 20 Penn State	Beaver Stadium; University Park, PA	ESPN	L 7–18	105,589	
November 9	11:00 am	at Wisconsin	Camp Randall Stadium; Madison, WI	ESPN Plus	W 37–20	78,709	
November 16	2:30 pm	No. 2 Ohio State	Memorial Stadium; Champaign, IL	ABC	L 16–23 ^{OT}	58,810	
November 23	11:00 am	at Northwestern	Ryan Field; Evanston, IL (rivaly)	ESPN Plus	W 31–24	25,134	
*Non-conference game; ^{†}Homecoming; Rankings from AP Poll released prior to the game; All times are in Central time

== Roster ==
2002 Illinois Fighting Illini football team roster
Players
Coaches
Offense

Pos.	#	Name	Class
WR	4	Ade Adeyemo	So
QB	16	Jon Beutjer	So
TE	89	Kenny Boyle	Jr
TE	87	Brett Boyter	Jr
QB	10	Tim Brasic	Fr
FB	24	Carey Davis	Jr
G	64	David Diehl	Sr
WR	17	Greg Lewis	Sr
WR	6	Brandon Lloyd	Sr
WR	86	Aaron Moorehead	Sr
C	75	Duke Preston	So
QB/RB	18	Walter Young	Sr

Defense

Pos.	#	Name	Class
CB	14	Nana Agyeman	Jr
S	22	Brian Brosnan	Fr
LB	44	Matt Sinclair	So
DB	28	Eugene Wilson	Sr

Special teams

Pos.	#	Name	Class
PK	97	Kyle Adams	Fr
WR	11	Dean Ordzowialy	Fr
P	37	Steve Weatherford	Fr

Head coach

- Ron Turner

Coordinators/assistant coaches

Legend

- (C) Team captain
- (S) Suspended
- (I) Ineligible
- Injured
- Redshirt

Roster

== Team players in the NFL ==
Player	Position	Round	Pick	NFL club
Eugene Wilson	Cornerback	2	36	New England Patriots
Brandon Lloyd	Wide Receiver	4	124	San Francisco 49ers
David Diehl	Guard	5	160	New York Giants
Tony Pashos	Tackle	5	173	Baltimore Ravens
Walter Young	Wide Receiver	7	226	Carolina Panthers
