= 2000 Iowa Hawkeyes football team =

American college football season

2000 Iowa Hawkeyes football
- Conference: Big Ten Conference
- Record: 3–9 (3–5 Big Ten)
- Head coach: Kirk Ferentz (2nd season)
- Offensive coordinator: Ken O'Keefe (2nd season)
- Offensive scheme: Pro-style
- Defensive coordinator: Norm Parker (2nd season)
- Base defense: 4–3
- MVPs: Kevin Kasper; LeVar Woods
- Captains: Jason Baker; A. J. Blazek; Anthony Herron; Kevin Kasper; LeVar Woods
- Home stadium: Kinnick Stadium

2000 Big Ten Conference football standings
	Conf.			Overall
Team	W		L	W		L
No. 11 Michigan +	6	–	2	9	–	3
Northwestern +	6	–	2	8	–	4
No. 13 Purdue $+	6	–	2	8	–	4
Ohio State	5	–	3	8	–	4
No. 23 Wisconsin	4	–	4	9	–	4
Minnesota	4	–	4	6	–	6
Penn State	4	–	4	5	–	7
Iowa	3	–	5	3	–	9
Illinois	2	–	6	5	–	6
Michigan State	2	–	6	5	–	6
Indiana	2	–	6	3	–	8
$ – BCS representative as conference champion; + – Conference co-champions; Rankings from AP Poll

The 2000 Iowa Hawkeyes football team represented the University of Iowa as a member of the Big Ten Conference during the 2000 NCAA Division I-A football season. Led by second-year head coach Kirk Ferentz, the Hawkeyes compiled an overall record of 3–9, including 3–5 in conference play, placing eighth in the Big Ten. The team played home games at Kinnick Stadium in Iowa City, Iowa.

== Schedule ==
Date	Time	Opponent	Site	TV	Result	Attendance
August 26	1:00 pm	vs. No. 8 Kansas State*	Arrowhead Stadium; Kansas City, MO (Eddie Robinson Classic)	FSN	L 7–27	77,148
September 9	1:00 pm	Western Michigan*	Kinnick Stadium; Iowa City, IA		L 21–27	55,650
September 16	11:00 am	Iowa State*	Kinnick Stadium; Iowa City, IA (rivalry)	ESPN Plus	L 14–24	70,397
September 23	2:30 pm	at No. 1 Nebraska*	Memorial Stadium; Lincoln, NE	ABC	L 13–42	78,070
September 30	6:00 pm	at Indiana	Memorial Stadium; Bloomington, IN	ESPN Plus	L 33–45	31,225
October 7	11:00 am	Michigan State^{†}	Kinnick Stadium; Iowa City, IA	ESPN Plus	W 21–16	63,920
October 14	1:05 pm	at Illinois	Memorial Stadium; Champaign, IL		L 0–31	62,639
October 21	11:00 am	No. 14 Ohio State	Kinnick Stadium; Iowa City, IA	ESPN Plus	L 10–38	60,495
October 28	11:00 am	Wisconsin	Kinnick Stadium; Iowa City, IA (rivalry)	ESPN Plus	L 7–13	62,560
November 4	11:00 am	at Penn State	Beaver Stadium; University Park, PA	ESPN Plus	W 26–23 ^{2OT}	95,437
November 11	11:00 am	No. 12 Northwestern	Kinnick Stadium; Iowa City, IA	ESPN Plus	W 27–17	54,345
November 18	2:30 pm	at Minnesota	Hubert H. Humphrey Metrodome; Minneapolis, MN (rivalry)	ESPN Plus	L 24–27	54,387
*Non-conference game; ^{†}Homecoming; Rankings from AP Poll released prior to the game; All times are in Central time

== Game summaries ==
=== vs. No. 8 Kansas State ===
Iowa vs. No. 8 Kansas State

Team	1	2	3	4	Total
Hawkeyes	0	0	7	0	7
• No. 8 Wildcats	10	7	0	10	27

- Date: August 26
- Location: Arrowhead Stadium, Kansas City, Missouri
- Game attendance: 77,148
- Television network: FSN

Scoring summary
1	11:32	KSU	David Allen 1-yard run (Jamie Rheem kick)	KSU 7–0
1	3:35	KSU	Jamie Rheem 24-yard field goal	KSU 10–0
2	0:19	KSU	Quincy Morgan 4-yard pass from Jonathan Beasley (Jamie Rheem kick)	KSU 17–0
3	7:59	Iowa	Ladell Betts 1-yard run (Nate Kaeding kick)	KSU 17–7
4	5:03	KSU	Jonathan Beasley 8-yard run (Jamie Rheem kick)	KSU 24–7
4	1:38	KSU	Jamie Rheem 39-yard field goal	KSU 27–7

=== at No. 1 Nebraska ===
Iowa at No. 1 Nebraska

Team	1	2	3	4	Total
Hawkeyes	7	6	0	0	13
• No. 1 Cornhuskers	7	14	7	14	42

- Date: September 23
- Location: Memorial Stadium, Lincoln, Nebraska
- Game attendance: 78,070
- TV announcers (ABC): Sean McDonough and Ed Cunningham

Scoring summary
1	11:05	Iowa	Kevin Kasper 29-yard pass from Scott Mullen (Nate Kaeding kick)	Iowa 7–0
1	7:40	Neb	Matt Davison 31-yard pass from Eric Crouch (Josh Brown kick)	Tied 7–7
2	11:01	Neb	Tracey Wistrom 12-yard pass from Eric Crouch (Josh Brown kick)	Neb 14–7
2	8:40	Iowa	Nate Kaeding 40-yard field goal	Neb 14–10
2	1:44	Iowa	Nate Kaeding 39-yard field goal	Neb 14–13
2	0:00	Neb	Matt Davison 43-yard pass from Eric Crouch (Josh Brown kick)	Neb 21–13
3	11:25	Neb	Tracey Wistrom 10-yard pass from Eric Crouch (Josh Brown kick)	Neb 28–13
4	1:27	Neb	Tracey Wistrom 4-yard pass from Eric Crouch (Josh Brown kick)	Neb 35–13
4	0:55	Neb	Troy Watchorn 39-yard interception return (Josh Brown kick)	Neb 42–13

Despite being 42-point underdogs, Iowa marched for a touchdown on their opening possession to take a 7-0 lead. Later in the first half, the Hawkeyes closed within 14-13 after Nate Kaeding's second field goal. Nebraska stretched the margin with a long touchdown pass on the final play of the first half and two touchdowns in the final 1:27 of the game.

=== Michigan State ===
Michigan State at Iowa

Team	1	2	3	4	Total
Spartans	0	9	7	0	16
• Hawkeyes	7	0	7	7	21

- Date: October 7
- Location: Kinnick Stadium, Iowa City, Iowa
- Game attendance: 63,920
- Television network: ESPN Plus

Scoring summary
1	7:28	Iowa	Ladell Betts 4-yard run (Nate Kaeding kick)	Iowa 7–0
2	13:15	MSU	McCoy 2-yard pass from Van Dyke (kick failed)	Iowa 7–6
2	0:08	MSU	Schaefer 23-yard field goal	MSU 9–7
3	1:22	MSU	TJ Duckett 32-yard run (Schaefer kick)	MSU 16–7
3	1:02	Iowa	Kahlil Hill 90-yard kickoff return (Kaeding kick)	MSU 16–14
4	2:47	Iowa	Kevin Kasper 43-yard pass from Jon Beutjer (Kaeding kick)	Iowa 21–16

The Hawkeyes snapped a 13-game losing streak in capturing Coach Ferentz's first Big Ten win.

=== Wisconsin ===
Wisconsin at Iowa

Team	1	2	3	4	Total
• Badgers	3	10	0	0	13
Hawkeyes	0	0	7	0	7

- Date: October 28
- Location: Kinnick Stadium, Iowa City, Iowa
- Game attendance: 62,560
- Television network: ESPN Plus

Scoring summary
1	7:17	Wis	Pisetsky 46-yard field goal	Wis 3–0
2	12:56	Wis	Pisetsky 32-yard field goal	Wis 6–0
2	7:55	Wis	Michael Bennett 1-yard run (Pisetsky kick)	Wis 13–0
3	2:09	Iowa	Kahlil Hill 7-yard pass from Kyle McCann (Kaeding kick)	Wis 13–7

=== at Penn State ===
Iowa at Penn State

Team	1	2	3	4	OT	2OT	Total
• Hawkeyes	7	6	0	3	7	3	26
Nittany Lions	0	3	3	10	7	0	23

- Date: November 4
- Location: Beaver Stadium, University Park, Pennsylvania
- Game attendance: 95,437

Scoring summary
1	IOWA	Hill 6-yard pass from McCann (Kaeding kick)	Iowa 7–0
2	IOWA	Kaeding 48-yard field goal	Iowa 10–0
2	IOWA	Kaeding 49-yard field goal	Iowa 13–0
2	PSU	Primanti 42-yard field goal	Iowa 13–3
3	PSU	Primanti 32-yard field goal	Iowa 13–6
4	PSU	J Gilmore 2-yard pass from Casey (Primanti kick)	Tie 13–13
4	IOWA	Kaeding 46-yard field goal	Iowa 16–13
4	PSU	Primanti 28-yard field goal	Tie 16–16
OT	PSU	Casey 6-yard run (Primanti kick)	Penn St 23–16
OT	IOWA	Betts 11-yard run (Kaeding kick)	Tie 23–23
2OT	IOWA	Kaeding 26-yard field goal	Iowa 26–23

This was the first of five consecutive Hawkeye victories (and 8 of 9) in the series.

=== No. 12 Northwestern ===
No. 12 Northwestern at Iowa

Team	1	2	3	4	Total
No. 12 Wildcats	0	3	7	7	17
• Hawkeyes	3	10	7	7	27

- Date: November 11
- Location: Kinnick Stadium, Iowa City, Iowa
- Game attendance: 54,345
- TV announcers (ESPN Plus): Wayne Larrivee, Randy Wright, and Chris Miller

Scoring summary
1	1:20	Iowa	Nate Kaeding 42-yard field goal	Iowa 3–0
2	9:28	NW	Long 34-yard field goal	Tied 3–3
2	4:11	Iowa	Nate Kaeding 46-yard field goal	Iowa 6–3
2	0:35	Iowa	Kahlil Hill 11-yard pass from Kyle McCann (G McLaughlin kick)	Iowa 13–3
3	10:13	Iowa	Kevin Kasper 42-yard pass from Kyle McCann (Kaeding kick)	Iowa 20–3
3	1:59	NW	Kustok 1-yard run (Long kick)	Iowa 20–10
4	6:58	Iowa	Kyle McCann 1-yard run (Kaeding kick)	Iowa 27–10
4		NW	Schweighardt 10-yard pass from Kustok (Long kick)	Iowa 27–17

The Hawkeyes never trailed in knocking off the #12/#18 Wildcats. It was the first time in three years that Iowa had won consecutive games.

== Roster ==
2000 Iowa Hawkeyes football team roster
Players
Coaches
Offense

Pos.	#	Name	Class
QB	16	Jon Beutjer	Fr
QB	4	Kyle McCann	Jr
QB	18	Scott Mullen	Sr
RB	45	Jonathan Babineaux	Fr
RB	46	Ladell Betts	Jr
RB	40	Edgar Cervantes	Fr
RB	15	Robbie Crockett	Jr
RB	34	Aaron Greving	Fr
RB	29	Jermelle Lewis	Fr
RB	32	Siaka Massaquoi	Fr
RB	45	Henry Pollio	Sr
RB	2	Fred Russell	Fr
WR	88	Ryan Barton	Sr
WR	9	Maurice Brown	Fr
WR	3	Kahlil Hill	Jr
WR	87	Kevin Kasper	Sr
WR	13	Ramon Ochoa	Fr
WR	6	Chris Oliver	Jr
TE	85	Robert Gallery	Fr
TE	35	Erik Jensen	Fr
TE	83	Kyle Trippeer	Sr
OL	77	Sam Aiello	Fr
OL	52	A. J. Blazek
OL	74	Alonzo Cunningham	Jr
OL	70	Andy Lightfoot	So
OL	72	Bruce Nelson	So
OL	73	David Porter	So
OL	56	Eric Steinbach	So

Defense

Pos.	#	Name	Class
DL	90	Jared Clauss	Fr
DL	94	Colin Cole	So
DL	99	Anthony Herron	Sr
DL	48	Howard Hodges	Fr
DL	54	Aaron Kampman	Jr
DL	91	Jerry Montgomery	Jr
DL	92	Derrick Pickens	Jr
LB	51	Fred Barr	So
LB	44	Dallas Clark	Fr
LB	37	Derrick Davison	Sr
LB	39	Mike Dolezal	Jr
LB	50	George Lewis	Fr
LB	30	Roger Meyer	Jr
LB	42	Grant Steen	Fr
LB	97	LeVar Woods	Sr
LB	53	Kevin Worthy	Fr
DB	8	Mikkel Brown	Jr
DB	1	Tim Dodge	So
DB	10	Shane Hall	Jr
DB	14	Ryan Hansen	Jr
DB	25	Derek Pagel	So
DB	27	Robbertto Rickards	Jr
DB	33	Bob Sanders	Fr
DB	19	Benny Sapp	Fr
DB	21	Matt Stockdale	Jr
DB	26	Jeff Buch	Sr

Special teams

Pos.	#	Name	Class
K	95	Nate Kaeding	Fr
K	24	Greg McLaughlin	Sr
P	7	Jason Baker	Sr

Head coach

- Kirk Ferentz

Coordinators/assistant coaches

- Ken O'Keefe– Offensive Coordinator/Quarterbacks
- Norm Parker – Defensive Coordinator
- Joe Philbin – Offensive line
- Carl Jackson – Running backs
- Eric Johnson – Tight ends
- Lester Erb – Wide receivers/Special teams
- Ron Aiken – Defensive line
- Bret Bielema – Linebackers
- Phil Parker – Secondary
- Reese Morgan – Recruiting Coordinator
- Chris Doyle – Strength and Conditioning
- Bill Ennis-Inge – Graduate assistant/Recruiting coordinator
- Jon McLaughlin – Graduate Assistant

Legend

- (C) Team captain
- (S) Suspended
- (I) Ineligible
- Injured
- Redshirt

Roster

== Team players in the 2001 NFL draft ==
Player	Position	Round	Pick	NFL club	Ref
Kevin Kasper	Wide Receiver	6	190	Denver Broncos	
