= 2000 Minnesota Golden Gophers football team =

American college football season

2000 Minnesota Golden Gophers football

MicronPC.com Bowl, L 30–38 vs. NC State
- Conference: Big Ten Conference
- Record: 6–6 (4–4 Big Ten)
- Head coach: Glen Mason (4th season)
- Co-offensive coordinators: Mitch Browning (1st season); Tony Petersen (1st season)
- Defensive coordinator: David Gibbs (4th season)
- MVPs: Ben Hamilton; Ron Johnson
- Captains: Ben Hamilton; Sean Hoffman; Karon Riley
- Home stadium: Hubert H. Humphrey Metrodome

2000 Big Ten Conference football standings
	Conf.			Overall
Team	W		L	W		L
No. 11 Michigan +	6	–	2	9	–	3
Northwestern +	6	–	2	8	–	4
No. 13 Purdue $+	6	–	2	8	–	4
Ohio State	5	–	3	8	–	4
No. 23 Wisconsin	4	–	4	9	–	4
Minnesota	4	–	4	6	–	6
Penn State	4	–	4	5	–	7
Iowa	3	–	5	3	–	9
Illinois	2	–	6	5	–	6
Michigan State	2	–	6	5	–	6
Indiana	2	–	6	3	–	8
$ – BCS representative as conference champion; + – Conference co-champions; Rankings from AP Poll

The 2000 Minnesota Golden Gophers football team represented the University of Minnesota as a member of the Big Ten Conference the 2000 NCAA Division I-A football season. In their fourth year under head coach Glen Mason, the Golden Gophers compiled an overall record of 6–6 with a mark of 4–4 in conference play, placing in a three-way tie for fifth in the Big Ten, and outscored opponents 375 to 318. Minnesota was invited to the MicronPC.com Bowl, where the Golden Gophers lost NC State. The team played home games at the Hubert H. Humphrey Metrodome in Minneapolis.

== Schedule ==
Date	Time	Opponent	Rank	Site	TV	Result	Attendance	Source
September 2	11:00 am	Louisiana–Monroe*		Hubert H. Humphrey Metrodome; Minneapolis, MN	MSC	W 47–10	40,183	
September 9	1:30 pm	Ohio*		Hubert H. Humphrey Metrodome; Minneapolis, MN		L 17–23	41,637	
September 16	11:30 am	at Baylor*		Floyd Casey Stadium; Waco, TX	FSN	W 34–9	20,125	
September 23	11:00 am	at No. 21 Purdue		Ross–Ade Stadium; West Lafayette, IN	ESPN	L 24–38	67,425	
September 30	11:00 am	No. 22 Illinois		Hubert H. Humphrey Metrodome; Minneapolis, MN	ESPN	W 44–10	44,462	
October 7	11:00 am	Penn State		Hubert H. Humphrey Metrodome; Minneapolis, MN (Governor's Victory Bell)	ESPN2	W 25–16	44,439	
October 14	11:00 am	at No. 6 Ohio State		Ohio Stadium; Columbus, OH	ESPN2	W 29–17	98,120	
October 21	1:00 pm	at Indiana	No. 22	Memorial Stadium; Bloomington, IN		L 43–51	30,882	
October 28	11:00 am	No. 23 Northwestern		Hubert H. Humphrey Metrodome; Minneapolis, MN	ESPN2	L 35–41	59,004	
November 4	11:00 am	Wisconsin		Camp Randall Stadium; Madison, WI (rivalry)	ESPN2	L 20–41	79,171	
November 18	11:00 am	Iowa		Hubert H. Humphrey Metrodome; Minneapolis, MN (rivalry)	ESPN Plus	W 27–24	54,387	
December 28	6:00 pm	vs. NC State*		Pro Player Stadium; Miami Gardens, Florida (MicronPC.com Bowl)	TBS	L 30–38	28,359	
*Non-conference game; Rankings from AP Poll released prior to the game; All times are in Central time

== Rankings ==
Ranking movements Legend: ██ Increase in ranking ██ Decrease in ranking — = Not ranked
	Week																
Poll	Pre	1	2	3	4	5	6	7	8	9	10	11	12	13	14	15	Final
AP	—	—	—	—	—	—	—	—	22	—	—	—	—	—	—	—	—
Coaches	—	—	—	—	—	—	—	—	23	—	—	—	—	—	—	—	—
BCS	Not released									—	—	—	—	—	—	—	Not released

== Game summaries ==
=== At No. 6 Ohio State ===
Team	1	2	3	4	Total
• Golden Gophers	17	6	0	6	29
No. 6 Buckeyes	3	7	0	7	17

- Date: October 14
- Location: Ohio Stadium, Columbus, Ohio
- Game attendance: 98,120

Scoring summary
1	8:16	Minnesota	Dan Nystrom 23-yard field goal	Minnesota 3-0
1	5:12	Minnesota	Scooter Baugus 2-yard pass from Travis Cole (Dan Nystrom kick)	Minnesota 10-0
1	2:58	Ohio St	Dan Stultz 32-yard field goal	Minnesota 10-3
1	0:03	Minnesota	Ron Johnson 3-yard pass from Travis Cole (Dan Nystrom kick)	Minnesota 17-3
2	11:48	Ohio St	Jonathan Wells 7-yard run (Dan Stultz kick)	Minnesota 17-10
2	8:34	Minnesota	Dan Nystrom 32-yard field goal	Minnesota 20-10
2	3:47	Minnesota	Dan Nystrom 42-yard field goal	Minnesota 23-10
4	12:24	Ohio St	Darnell Sanders 4-yard pass from Steve Bellisari (Dan Stultz kick)	Minnesota 23-17
4	4:51	Minnesota	Tellis Redmon 20-yard run (two-point conversion failed)	Minnesota 29-17

Minnesota snapped a 16-game losing streak to Ohio State and beat Glen Mason's alma mater in Columbus for the first time since 1949.

== Roster ==
2000 Minnesota Golden Gophers football team roster
Players
Coaches
Offense

Pos.	#	Name	Class
QB	8	Asad Abdul-Khaliq	Fr
TE	88	Scooter Baugus	So
WR	18	Antonie Burns	Jr
OL	68	Derek Burns	Jr
QB		Travis Cole	Jr
RB	33	Renato Fitzpatrick	So
OT	74	Adam Haayer	Sr
G	55	Ben Hamilton	Sr
WR	4	Antoine Henderson	Sr
WR	3	Ron Johnson	Jr
WR	80	Elvin Jones
QB	19	Benji Kamrath	Fr
WR	1	Ryan Keller	Sr
OL	75	Jake Kuppe
WR	15	Jermaine Mays	Jr
WR	17	Tony Patterson	Fr
RB	32	Tellis Redmon	So
OL	66	Ryan Roth	Jr
RB	44	Thomas Tapeh	Fr
TE	82	Ben Utecht	Fr

Defense

Pos.	#	Name	Class
DE	99	Matt Anderle	Jr
LB	31	Phil Archer	Fr
S, WR	2	Jack Brewer	Jr
DB	13	Trevis Graham	Sr
DB	26	Clorenzo Griffin	Sr
LB	38	Justin Hall	Sr
LB	6	Jimmy Henry	Jr
LB	45	Sean Hoffman	Sr
DB	21	Delvin Jones	Jr
DE	87	Dan Kwapinski	Fr
CB	39	Michael Lehan	So
LB	97	Ben Mezera	Sr
CB	42	Willie Middlebrooks	Jr
LB	9	Curtese Poole	Sr
DE	91	Karon Riley	Sr
DT	93	John Schlecht	Sr
DL	41	Eric Stenzel	Fr
DL	50	Greg White	Jr
DL		Maurice White

Special teams

Pos.	#	Name	Class
P	14	Preston Gruening	So
K	28	Dan Nystrom	So

Head coach

- Glen Mason

Coordinators/assistant coaches

Legend

- (C) Team captain
- (S) Suspended
- (I) Ineligible
- Injured
- Redshirt

Roster
