= 2000 Alamo Bowl =

2000 Sylvania Alamo Bowl
Nebraska Cornhuskers	Northwestern Wildcats
(9–2)	(8–3)
Big 12	Big Ten
66	17
Head coach: Frank Solich	Head coach: Randy Walker
AP / Coaches / BCS; 9 / 8 / 8	AP / Coaches / BCS; 18 / 19 / NR
	1	2	3	4	Total
Nebraska	7	31	21	7	66
Northwestern	3	14	0	0	17
- Date: December 30, 2000
- Season: 2000
- Stadium: Alamodome
- Location: San Antonio, Texas
- Referee: Gerald Wright (Mtn. West)

United States TV coverage
- Network: ESPN
- Announcers: Dave Barnett, Bill Curry, Mike Golic, and Michele Tafoya

The 2000 Alamo Bowl featured the Nebraska Cornhuskers, and the Northwestern Wildcats. Despite both teams being ranked, it was the biggest blowout in the game's history. Nebraska broke an NCAA bowl record by scoring 66 points, and the Huskers also set ten other Alamo Bowl records, including those for most yards of total offense (636) most rushing yards (476), most first downs (28), and most yards per play (7.7).

Nebraska scored first, following a 15-yard touchdown run by Dan Alexander as Nebraska seized a 7–0 lead. Northwestern got on the board with a 44-yard field goal from Tim Long, to trim the lead to 7–3. Northwestern's defense stopped Nebraska and got the ball back. Quarterback Zak Kustok hit Teddy Johnson for a 10-yard touchdown, and Northwestern got a 10–7 lead.

On the first play after the kickoff, quarterback Eric Crouch used Nebraska's option attack, and ran 50 yards for a touchdown, and Nebraska took a 14–10 lead, one they never relinquished. Two minutes later, Dan Alexander rushed two yards for a touchdown, increasing the lead to 21–10. Correll Buckhalter scored four minutes later on a 2-yard touchdown run, as Nebraska's lead became 28–10.

Kicker Josh Brown kicked a 51-yard field goal with 1:28 left in the half to increase Nebraska's lead to 31–10. Northwestern's Damien Anderson scored on a 65-yard touchdown run with 1:10 left to make it 31–17. Nebraska came right back, capping a 31-point quarter, with a 58-yard screen pass from Eric Crouch to wide receiver Bobby Newcombe stretching their lead to 38–17.

In the third quarter, Crouch hit wide receiver Matt Davison for an 11-yard touchdown pass, increasing the lead to 45–17. Crouch later rushed two yards for a touchdown, and the lead became 52–17. Bobby Newcombe then threw a 69-yard touchdown pass to Matt Davison, making the lead 59–17. Early in the fourth quarter, Dahrran Diedrick rushed 9 yards for a touchdown, making the final margin 66–17.

The Huskers record for points stood until the 2011 Alamo Bowl, when Baylor defeated Washington, 67–56.
