= 1993 Illinois Fighting Illini football team =

American college football season

1993 Illinois Fighting Illini football
- Conference: Big Ten Conference
- Record: 5–6 (5–3 Big Ten)
- Head coach: Lou Tepper (2nd season)
- Offensive coordinator: Greg Landry (1st season)
- Defensive coordinator: Denny Marcin (2nd season)
- MVP: Dana Howard
- Captains: Greg Engel; Filmel Johnson; Gary Voelker
- Home stadium: Memorial Stadium

1993 Big Ten Conference football standings
	Conf.					Overall
Team	W		L		T	W		L		T
No. 6 Wisconsin +	6	–	1	–	1	10	–	1	–	1
No. 11 Ohio State +	6	–	1	–	1	10	–	1	–	1
No. 8 Penn State	6	–	2	–	0	10	–	2	–	0
Indiana	5	–	3	–	0	8	–	4	–	0
No. 21 Michigan	5	–	3	–	0	8	–	4	–	0
Illinois	5	–	3	–	0	5	–	6	–	0
Michigan State	4	–	4	–	0	6	–	6	–	0
Iowa	3	–	5	–	0	6	–	6	–	0
Minnesota	3	–	5	–	0	4	–	7	–	0
Northwestern	0	–	8	–	0	2	–	9	–	0
Purdue	0	–	8	–	0	1	–	10	–	0
+ – Conference co-champions; Rankings from AP Poll

The 1993 Illinois Fighting Illini football team was an American football team that represented the University of Illinois at Urbana-Champaign as a member of the Big Ten Conference during the 1993 NCAA Division I-A football season. In their second year under head coach Lou Tepper, the Fighting Illini compiled a 5–6 record (5–3 in conference games), finished in a three-way tie for fourth place in the Big Ten, and were outscored by a total of 210 to 204.

The team's statistical leaders included quarterback Johnny Johnson (1,688 passing yards), running back Ty Douthard (599 rushing yards, 43 receptions, 406 receiving yards), and kicker Chris Richardson (60 points scored, 18 of 19 extra points, 14 of 20 field goals). Tackle Brad Hopkins was selected by the Associated Press as a first-team player on the 1993 All-Big Ten Conference football team.

The team played its home games at Memorial Stadium in Champaign, Illinois.

== Schedule ==
Date	Opponent	Site	Result	Attendance	Source
September 11	at Missouri*	Faurot Field; Columbia, MO (rivalry)	L 3–31	48,427	
September 18	No. 15 Arizona*	Memorial Stadium; Champaign, IL	L 14–16	51,110	
September 25	Oregon*	Memorial Stadium; Champaign, IL	L 7–13	45,574	
October 2	at Purdue	Ross–Ade Stadium; West Lafayette, IN (rivalry)	W 28–10	37,621	
October 9	No. 6 Ohio State	Memorial Stadium; Champaign, IL (Illibuck)	L 12–20	61,209	
October 16	at Iowa	Kinnick Stadium; Iowa City, IA	W 49–3	70,397	
October 23	at No. 13 Michigan	Michigan Stadium; Ann Arbor, MI (rivalry)	W 24–21	106,385	
October 30	Northwestern	Memorial Stadium; Champaign, IL (rivalry)	W 20–13	49,940	
November 6	Minnesota	Memorial Stadium; Champaign, IL	W 23–20	50,192	
November 13	at No. 16 Penn State	Beaver Stadium; University Park, PA	L 14–28	90,000	
November 20	No. 12 Wisconsin	Memorial Stadium; Champaign, IL	L 10–35	48,083	
*Non-conference game; Rankings from AP Poll released prior to the game

== Roster ==
1993 Illinois Fighting Illini football team roster
Players
Coaches
Offense

Pos.	#	Name	Class
TE	86	Matt Cushing	Fr
TE	87	Ken Dilger	Jr
FB	35	Tyler Donnelly	Sr
RB	7	Ty Douthard	Fr
WR	83	Jason Dulick	Fr
OL	67	Charles Edwards	So
C	56	Greg Engel	Sr
QB	13	Johnny Johnson	So
QB	17	Jeff Schwarzentraub	Sr

Defense

Pos.	#	Name	Class
LB	98	Scott Allen	So
LB	57	Julio Argueta	Fr
LB	56	Doug Arneson	Fr
DB	43	Jeff Arneson	Sr
LB	51	Kevin Hardy	So
LB	52	John Holecek	Jr
DE	97	Simeon Rice	So
CB	29	Scott Turner	Jr
LB	50	Dana Howard	Jr

Special teams

Pos.	#	Name	Class
K	13	Eric Barofsky	Jr

Head coach

- Lou Tepper

Coordinators/assistant coaches

Legend

- (C) Team captain
- (S) Suspended
- (I) Ineligible
- Injured
- Redshirt

Roster
