= 2000 Penn State Nittany Lions football team =

American college football season

2000 Penn State Nittany Lions football
- Conference: Big Ten Conference
- Record: 5–7 (4–4 Big Ten)
- Head coach: Joe Paterno (35th season)
- Offensive coordinator: Fran Ganter (17th season)
- Offensive scheme: Pro-style
- Defensive coordinator: Tom Bradley (1st season)
- Base defense: 4–3
- Captains: James Boyd; Rashard Casey; Mike Cerimele; Justin Kurpeikis
- Home stadium: Beaver Stadium

2000 Big Ten Conference football standings
	Conf.			Overall
Team	W		L	W		L
No. 11 Michigan +	6	–	2	9	–	3
Northwestern +	6	–	2	8	–	4
No. 13 Purdue $+	6	–	2	8	–	4
Ohio State	5	–	3	8	–	4
No. 23 Wisconsin	4	–	4	9	–	4
Minnesota	4	–	4	6	–	6
Penn State	4	–	4	5	–	7
Iowa	3	–	5	3	–	9
Illinois	2	–	6	5	–	6
Michigan State	2	–	6	5	–	6
Indiana	2	–	6	3	–	8
$ – BCS representative as conference champion; + – Conference co-champions; Rankings from AP Poll

The 2000 Penn State Nittany Lions football team represented the Pennsylvania State University as a member of the Big Ten Conference during the 2000 NCAA Division I-A football season. Led by 35th-year head coach Joe Paterno, the Nittany Lions compiled an overall record of 5–7 with a mark of 4–4 in conference play, placing in a three-way tie for fifth in the Big Ten. Penn State did not a make a bowl game for the first time since the 1988 season. The team played home games at Beaver Stadium in University Park, Pennsylvania.

== Schedule ==
Date	Time	Opponent	Rank	Site	TV	Result	Attendance	Source
August 27	2:30 p.m.	vs. No. 16 USC*	No. 17	Giants Stadium; East Rutherford, NJ (Kickoff Classic)	ABC	L 5–29	78,902	
September 2	12:00 p.m.	Toledo*		Beaver Stadium; University Park, PA	ESPN2	L 6–24	94,296	
September 9	12:00 p.m.	Louisiana Tech*		Beaver Stadium; University Park, PA	ESPN Plus	W 67–7	94,555	
September 16	3:30 p.m.	at Pittsburgh*		Three Rivers Stadium; Pittsburgh, PA (rivalry)	CBS	L 0–12	61,221	
September 23	12:00 p.m.	at No. 12 Ohio State		Ohio Stadium; Columbus, OH (rivalry)	ABC	L 6–45	98,144	
September 30	3:30 p.m.	No. 22 Purdue		Beaver Stadium; University Park, PA	ABC	W 22–20	96,023	
October 7	12:00 p.m.	at Minnesota		Hubert H. Humphrey Metrodome; Minneapolis, MN (Governor's Victory Bell)	ESPN2	L 16–25	44,439	
October 21	12:00 p.m.	Illinois^{†}		Beaver Stadium; University Park, PA	ESPN2	W 39–25	96,475	
October 28	7:00 p.m.	vs. Indiana		RCA Dome; Indianapolis, IN	ESPN2	W 27–24	43,122	
November 4	12:00 p.m.	Iowa		Beaver Stadium; University Park, PA	ESPN Plus	L 23–26 ^{2OT}	95,437	
November 11	12:00 p.m.	at No. 21 Michigan		Michigan Stadium; Ann Arbor, MI (rivalry)	ESPN	L 11–33	110,803	
November 18	12:00 p.m.	Michigan State		Beaver Stadium; University Park, PA (rivalry)	ESPN Plus	W 42–23	96,070	
*Non-conference game; ^{†}Homecoming; Rankings from AP Poll released prior to the game; All times are in Eastern time

== Rankings ==
Ranking movements Legend: ██ Increase in ranking ██ Decrease in ranking — = Not ranked
	Week																
Poll	Pre	1	2	3	4	5	6	7	8	9	10	11	12	13	14	15	Final
AP	22	—	—	—	—	—	—	—	—	—	—	—	—	—	—	—	—
Coaches Poll	17	—	—	—	—	—	—	—	—	—	—	—	—	—	—	—	—
BCS	Not released									—	—	—	—	—	—	—	Not released

== Roster ==
2000 Penn State Nittany Lions football team roster
Players
Coaches
Offense

Pos.	#	Name	Class
FB	36	Mike Cerimele	Sr
WR	13	Sam Crenshaw	Sr
WR	20	Eddie Drummond	Jr
RB	34	Omar Easy	Jr
TE	85	John Gilmore	Jr
G	71	Joe Hartings	Jr
WR	24	Bryant Johnson	So
RB	5	Larry Johnson	So
WR	11	Tony Johnson	Fr
TE	88	Matt Kranchick	Fr
FB	82	Sean McHugh	Fr
OT	67	Kareem McKenzie	Sr
QB	12	Rashard Casey	Sr
QB	4	Matt Senneca	So
C	56	Geoff Stryker	Jr

Defense

Pos.	#	Name	Class
CB	1	Bruce Branch	Jr
CB	6	James Boyd	Sr
DT	99	Tim Falls	So
LB	21	Shamar Finney	Jr
CB	25	Rich Gardner	Fr
LB	94	Israel Paniagua	Sr
DE	81	Michael Haynes	So
DE	96	Bob Jones	Jr
CB	10	Bhawoh Jue	Sr
DE	37	Justin Kurpeikis	Sr
CB	26	Bryan Scott	So

Special teams

Pos.	#	Name	Class

Head coach

- Joe Paterno

Coordinators/assistant coaches

Legend

- (C) Team captain
- (S) Suspended
- (I) Ineligible
- Injured
- Redshirt

Roster

== NFL draft ==
Four Nittany Lions were drafted in the 2001 NFL draft.

Round	Pick	Overall	Name	Position	Team
3rd	9	71	Bhawoh Jue	Free safety	Green Bay Packers
3rd	17	79	Kareem McKenzie	Offensive tackle	New York Jets
3rd	32	94	James Boyd	Strong safety	Jacksonville Jaguars
5th	16	147	Tony Stewart	Tight end	Philadelphia Eagles
