= 2000 Michigan State Spartans football team =

American college football season

2000 Michigan State Spartans football
- Conference: Big Ten Conference
- Record: 5–6 (2–6 Big Ten)
- Head coach: Bobby Williams (1st season)
- Offensive coordinator: Morris Watts (10th season)
- Defensive coordinator: Bill Miller (2nd season)
- Home stadium: Spartan Stadium

2000 Big Ten Conference football standings
	Conf.			Overall
Team	W		L	W		L
No. 11 Michigan +	6	–	2	9	–	3
Northwestern +	6	–	2	8	–	4
No. 13 Purdue $+	6	–	2	8	–	4
Ohio State	5	–	3	8	–	4
No. 23 Wisconsin	4	–	4	9	–	4
Minnesota	4	–	4	6	–	6
Penn State	4	–	4	5	–	7
Iowa	3	–	5	3	–	9
Illinois	2	–	6	5	–	6
Michigan State	2	–	6	5	–	6
Indiana	2	–	6	3	–	8
$ – BCS representative as conference champion; + – Conference co-champions; Rankings from AP Poll

The 2000 Michigan State Spartans football team represented Michigan State University as a member of the Big Ten Conference during the 2000 NCAA Division I-A football season. Led by first-year head coach Bobby Williams, the Spartans compiled an overall record of 5–6 with a mark of 2–6 in conference play, placing in a three-way tie for ninth at the bottom of the Big Ten standings. The team played home games at Spartan Stadium in East Lansing, Michigan.

Williams, who took over the program after previous head coach Nick Saban left to take the head coaching position at Louisiana State University (LSU).

== Schedule ==
Date	Time	Opponent	Rank	Site	TV	Result	Attendance
September 9	12:00 p.m.	Marshall*	No. 24	Spartan Stadium; East Lansing, MI	ESPN	W 34–24	72,983
September 16	7:00 p.m.	at Missouri*	No. 22	Faurot Field; Columbia, MO	FSN	W 13–10	55,289
September 23	3:30 p.m.	No. 16 Notre Dame*	No. 23	Spartan Stadium; East Lansing, MI (rivalry)	ABC	W 27–21	74,714
September 30	12:00 p.m.	Northwestern	No. 18	Spartan Stadium; East Lansing, MI	ESPN Plus	L 17–37	73,128
October 7	12:00 p.m.	at Iowa		Kinnick Stadium; Iowa City, IA	ESPN Plus	L 16–21	63,290
October 14	12:00 p.m.	Wisconsin^{†}		Spartan Stadium; East Lansing, MI	ESPN Plus	L 10–17	74,863
October 21	3:30 p.m.	at No. 16 Michigan		Michigan Stadium; Ann Arbor, MI (rivalry)	ABC	L 0–14	111,514
October 28	12:00 p.m.	Illinois		Spartan Stadium; East Lansing, MI	ESPN	W 14–10	73,826
November 4	12:00 p.m.	at No. 16 Ohio State		Ohio Stadium; Columbus, OH	ESPN	L 13–27	98,406
November 11	1:05 p.m.	No. 9 Purdue		Spartan Stadium; East Lansing, MI	ABC	W 30–10	74,624
November 18	12:00 p.m.	at Penn State		Beaver Stadium; University Park, PA (rivalry)	ESPN Plus	L 23–42	96,070
*Non-conference game; ^{†}Homecoming; Rankings from AP Poll released prior to the game; All times are in Eastern time

== Rankings ==
Ranking movements Legend: ██ Increase in ranking ██ Decrease in ranking — = Not ranked
	Week																
Poll	Pre	1	2	3	4	5	6	7	8	9	10	11	12	13	14	15	Final
AP	25	24	24	22	23	18	—	—	—	—	—	—	—	—	—	—	—
Coaches Poll	22	22	23	20	20	15	25	—	—	—	—	—	—	—	—	—	—
BCS	Not released									—	—	—	—	—	—	—	Not released

== Roster ==
2000 Michigan State Spartans football team roster
Players
Coaches
Offense

Pos.	#	Name	Class
WR	1	Charles Rogers	Fr
RB	8	T. J. Duckett	So
QB	9	Jeff Smoker	Fr
OT	74	Tupe Peko	Sr
TE	83	Chris Baker	Jr

Defense

Pos.	#	Name	Class
CB	15	Renaldo Hill	Sr
LB	35	T. J. Turner	Sr
LB	50	Josh Thornhill	Jr
DT	95	Josh Shaw	Jr

Special teams

Pos.	#	Name	Class
P	12	Craig Jarrett	Jr

Head coach

- Bobby Williams

Coordinators/assistant coaches

- Morris Watts (offensive coordinator)
- Reggie Mitchell (running backs coach)
- Don Treadwell (wide receivers coach)
- Jeff Stoutland (offensive line coach)
- Bill Miller (defensive coordinator)
- Bill Sheridan (linebackers coach)
- Mark Dantonio (defensive backs coach)
- Brad Lawing (assistant)
- Pat Perles (assistant)

Legend

- (C) Team captain
- (S) Suspended
- (I) Ineligible
- Injured
- Redshirt

Roster

== 2001 NFL draft ==
The following players were selected in the 2001 NFL draft.

Player	Round	Pick	Position	NFL team
Renaldo Hill	7	202	Cornerback	Arizona Cardinals
Tupe Peko	7	217	Guard	New York Jets
T. J. Turner	7	239	Outside Linebacker	New England Patriots
