= 2000 Northwestern Wildcats football team =

American college football season

2000 Northwestern Wildcats football

Big Ten co-champion

Alamo Bowl, L 17—66 vs. Nebraska
- Conference: Big Ten Conference
- Record: 8–4 (6–2 Big Ten)
- Head coach: Randy Walker (2nd season)
- Offensive coordinator: Kevin Wilson (2nd season)
- Offensive scheme: Spread
- Base defense: 4–3
- Captains: Harold Blackmon; Conrad Emmerich
- Home stadium: Ryan Field

2000 Big Ten Conference football standings
| | Conf. | | | Overall |
| Team | W | | L | W | | L |
|---|---|---|---|---|---|---|
| No. 11 Michigan + | 6 | – | 2 | 9 | – | 3 |
| Northwestern + | 6 | – | 2 | 8 | – | 4 |
| No. 13 Purdue $+ | 6 | – | 2 | 8 | – | 4 |
| Ohio State | 5 | – | 3 | 8 | – | 4 |
| No. 23 Wisconsin | 4 | – | 4 | 9 | – | 4 |
| Minnesota | 4 | – | 4 | 6 | – | 6 |
| Penn State | 4 | – | 4 | 5 | – | 7 |
| Iowa | 3 | – | 5 | 3 | – | 9 |
| Illinois | 2 | – | 6 | 5 | – | 6 |
| Michigan State | 2 | – | 6 | 5 | – | 6 |
| Indiana | 2 | – | 6 | 3 | – | 8 |
$ – BCS representative as conference champion; + – Conference co-champions; Rankings from AP Poll

The 2000 Northwestern Wildcats football team represented Northwestern University as a member of the Big Ten Conference during the 2000 NCAA Division I-A football season. Led by second-year head coach Randy Walker, the Wildcats compiled an overall record of 8–4 with a mark of 6–2 in conference play, sharing the Big Ten title with Michigan and Purdue. Northwestern was invited to the Alamo Bowl, where the Wildcats lost to Nebraska. The team played home games at Ryan Field in Evanston, Illinois

== Schedule ==
| Date | Time | Opponent | Rank | Site | TV | Result | Attendance |
|---|---|---|---|---|---|---|---|
| August 31 | 7:00 pm | Northern Illinois* | | Ryan Field; Evanston, IL | | W 35–17 | 23,352 |
| September 9 | 12:00 pm | Duke* | | Ryan Field; Evanston, IL | | W 38–5 | 23,209 |
| September 16 | 11:00 am | at No. 20 TCU* | | Amon G. Carter Stadium; Fort Worth, TX | FSN | L 14–41 | 30,796 |
| September 23 | 11:00 am | at No. 7 Wisconsin | | Camp Randall Stadium; Madison, WI | ESPN Plus | W 47–44 ^{2OT} | 78,597 |
| September 30 | 11:00 am | at No. 18 Michigan State | | Spartan Stadium; East Lansing, MI | ESPN Plus | W 37–17 | 73,128 |
| October 7 | 11:00 am | Indiana | No. 22 | Ryan Field; Evanston, IL | ESPN Plus | W 52–33 | 30,201 |
| October 14 | 11:00 am | No. 21 Purdue^{†} | No. 17 | Ryan Field; Evanston, IL | ESPN | L 28–41 | 41,503 |
| October 28 | 11:00 am | at Minnesota | No. 23 | Hubert H. Humphrey Metrodome; Minneapolis, MN | ESPN2 | W 41–35 | 59,004 |
| November 4 | 2:30 pm | No. 12 Michigan | No. 21 | Ryan Field; Evanston, IL (rivalry) | ABC | W 54–51 | 47,130 |
| November 11 | 11:00 am | at Iowa | No. 12 | Kinnick Stadium; Iowa City, IA | ESPN Plus | L 17–27 | 54,345 |
| November 18 | 11:00 am | Illinois | No. 23 | Ryan Field; Evanston, IL (rivalry) | ESPN2 | W 61–23 | 40,658 |
| December 30 | 7:00 pm | vs. No. 9 Nebraska* | No. 18 | Alamodome; San Antonio, TX (Alamo Bowl) | ESPN | L 17–66 | 60,028 |
*Non-conference game; ^{†}Homecoming; Rankings from AP Poll released prior to the game; All times are in Central time

== Rankings ==
Ranking movements Legend: ██ Increase in ranking ██ Decrease in ranking — = Not ranked
| | Week | | | | | | | | | | | | | | | | |
| Poll | Pre | 1 | 2 | 3 | 4 | 5 | 6 | 7 | 8 | 9 | 10 | 11 | 12 | 13 | 14 | 15 | Final |
|---|---|---|---|---|---|---|---|---|---|---|---|---|---|---|---|---|---|
| AP | — | — | — | — | — | — | 22 | 17 | 25 | 23 | 21 | 12 | 23 | 20 | 19 | 18 | — |
| Coaches Poll | — | — | — | — | — | — | 24 | 18 | — | — | 23 | 18 | 24 | 21 | 20 | 19 | — |
| BCS | Not released | | | | | | | | | — | — | 15 | — | — | — | — | Not released |

== Personnel ==
2000 Northwestern Wildcats football team roster
Players
Coaches
Offense

| Pos. | # | Name | Class |
|---|---|---|---|
| RB | 20 | Damien Anderson | Sr |
| WR | 34 | Louis Ayeni | So |
| OL | 67 | Leon Brockmeier | Sr |
| OL | 77 | Lance Clelland | Sr |
| QB | 19 | Matt Danielson | So |
| TE | 15 | David Farman | Jr |
| WR | 85 | Ronnie Foster | So |
| WR | | Teddy Johnson | Sr |
| WR | | Roger Jordan | Fr |
| C | 62 | Austin King | So |
| QB | 10 | Zak Kustok | Sr |
| RB | | Kevin Lawrence | Jr |
| RB | | Gilles Lezi | Fr |
| OL | 66 | Steve Natali | Fr |
| WR | 86 | El DaSheon Nix | Fr |
| WR | 17 | Steve Parker | Jr |
| WR | 80 | Kunle Patrick | So |
| OT | 73 | Jeff Roehl | So |
| WR | | Jon Schweighardt | So |
| WR | 32 | Sam Simmons | Jr |
| OL | | Mike Souza |
| RB | | Torri Stuckey | Fr |
| WR | | Derrick Thompson | Sr |
| TE | | Eric Worley | So |
| RB | | Jason Wright | Fr |

Defense

| Pos. | # | Name | Class |
|---|---|---|---|
| LB | 2 | Kevin Bentley | Jr |
| CB | 6 | Harold Blackmon (C) | Sr |
| DE | 7 | Ray Bogenrief | Fr |
| DB | 25 | Marvin Brown | Sr |
| LB | 5 | Vincent Cartava | So |
| DL | 98 | Pete Chapman | So |
| DT | 92 | Javiar Collins | Sr |
| DB | 27 | Raheem Covington | Jr |
| LB | 3 | Pat Durr | So |
| DL | | Conrad Emmerich |
| LB | 8 | Napoleon Harris | Sr |
| DE | 95 | Dwayne Missouri | Sr |
| DB | | Rashad Morton |
| LB | | Billy Silva | Jr |
| DL | | Salem Simon |
| DB | | Rashidi Wheeler |
| DB | | Sean Wieber | Jr |

Special teams

| Pos. | # | Name | Class |
|---|---|---|---|
| K | | Brian Huffman | Fr |
| K | 39 | Tim Long | Sr |
| P | | J.J. Standring | Sr |

Head coach

- Randy Walker

Coordinators/assistant coaches

Legend

- (C) Team captain
- (S) Suspended
- (I) Ineligible
- Injured
- Redshirt

Roster
Last update: 2001-03-05
