= Bob Shannon (American football) =

American football coach

- Born: 1945 (age 80–81); Port Gibson, Mississippi, U.S.
- Occupation: Football coach

Bob Shannon (born 1945) is an American former high school football coach. He is best known for coaching the East St. Louis Flyers to six Illinois and two national championships.

== Early life ==
Robert Lavern Shannon was born 1945 in Port Gibson, Mississippi.

== Career ==
Shannon achieved a record of 192-34 in 20 seasons at East St. Louis. In 1985 he was selected as the USA Today High School Football Coach of the Year along with taking the High School Football National Championship. Shannon accused the school district of condoning corruption. He claimed the athletic director stole from the district. He left in 1995 after the school board backed the athletic director, who later pleaded guilty to stealing $90,000 from athletic accounts. Janet Reno awarded Shannon the United States Attorney General Award, an award rarely given outside of law enforcement, for his efforts to fight corruption. He coached Alton and Christian Brothers College High School before retiring from coaching in 2007 at the age of 63.

Shannon and the East St. Louis Flyers were the subject of the book The Right Kind of Heroes, by newspaper reporter Kevin Horrigan, who is now a columnist with the St. Louis Post-Dispatch. The book chronicles the Flyers' 1990 and 1991 seasons, during which they lost the state championship and then won it back. Shannon coached pro football players Dana Howard and Bryan Cox and baseball player Homer Bush, then a high school football star during his tenure at East St. Louis. Two years after retiring, Shannon was inducted into the St. Louis Metro Football Coaches Association hall of fame.

George H. W. Bush recognized Shannon as "a beacon of hope in a sea of despair." Bill Clinton named Shannon one of his 53 faces of hope during his 1992 presidential campaign. Shannon was selected for overcoming difficulties and leading his team to success. He was invited to lunch prior to the inauguration with Clinton and attended the inauguration.
