= Anthony Herron =

American football player and commentator (born 1979)

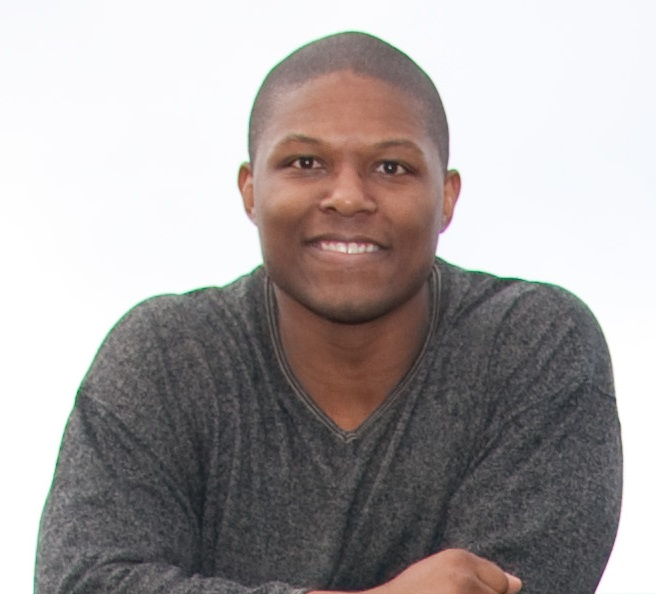
- Herron in 2012.

No. 77, 99
- Position: Defensive end

Personal information
- Born: September 24, 1979 (age 47); Bolingbrook, Illinois, U.S.
- Listed height: 6 ft 3 in (1.91 m)
- Listed weight: 280 lb (127 kg)

Career information
- High school: Bolingbrook (Bolingbrook, Illinois)
- College: Iowa
- NFL draft: 2001: undrafted

Career history

Playing
- Detroit Lions (2001)*; Green Bay Packers (2001)*; Detroit Lions (2001–2002); Indiana Firebirds (2004); Pittsburgh Steelers (2004)*; Atlanta Falcons (2004–2005)*; Nashville Kats (2006–2007)
- * Offseason or practice squad member only

Coaching
- Tennessee Valley Vipers (asst. HC/DC) (2008–2009)

Awards and highlights
- As assistant coach: ArenaCup champion (IX)

Career NFL statistics
- Games played: 1
- Stats at Pro Football Reference

Career AFL statistics
- Games played: 26
- Total tackles: 27.5
- Sacks: 4
- Pass deflections: 5
- Receiving touchdowns: 1
- Stats at ArenaFan.com

Anthony Glenn Herron (born September 24, 1979) is an American football commentator and former defensive end. Originally from Bolingbrook, Illinois, Herron played college football at Iowa. Following the 2001 NFL draft, Herron signed with the Detroit Lions as an undrafted free agent and spent three seasons with the team, in addition to short stints with the Green Bay Packers, Pittsburgh Steelers, and Atlanta Falcons. Although Herron played in only one NFL game, he had a more productive career in the Arena Football League with the Indiana Firebirds in 2004 and Nashville Kats in 2006 and 2007. A regular starter for the Kats in 2006, Herron played a total of 26 games in the Arena Football League.

After his playing career, Herron was assistant head coach and defensive coordinator for the Tennessee Valley Vipers of af2 from 2008 to 2009, helping the Vipers win the ArenaCup IX title in 2008. Herron also became a college football and NFL commentator on Chicago-area and national TV and radio, including the Big Ten Network, Pac-12 Network, and SiriusXM.

== Early life and college career ==
Born and raised in Bolingbrook, Illinois, Herron graduated from Bolingbrook High School in 1997. He played football, basketball, and track in high school. At the University of Iowa, Herron played at defensive end from 1997 to 2000 and was a regular starter in his last two seasons. As a senior in 2000, Herron had an honorable mention All-Big Ten season after making 64 tackles, three sacks, and two forced fumbles. In his college career, Herron had 172 tackles (including 19 for loss), 10 sacks, and one blocked kick. Herron completed his bachelor's degree in English at Tennessee State University during the 2006 offseason while playing for the Nashville Kats of the Arena Football League.

== Pro football career ==
=== NFL ===
After the 2001 NFL draft, Herron signed as an undrafted free agent with the Detroit Lions on April 27, 2001 and was released on September 2 following the preseason. On September 4, Herron signed with the Green Bay Packers. He was released on October 5 but re-signed with the Packers practice squad two weeks later on October 19. The Lions signed Herron to its active roster off the Packers practice squad on November 27. Herron made his NFL debut coming off the bench during the Lions' 2001 season finale, a 15–10 win over the Dallas Cowboys on January 6, 2002 that also marked the last NFL game played at the Pontiac Silverdome. That game would be Herron's only career game in the NFL.

Due to a foot injury, Herron was on the Lions' physically unable to perform list throughout the 2002 season. The Lions released Herron on August 26, 2003. In 2004, Herron signed with the Pittsburgh Steelers on August 9 but was cut on August 27. Later that year, he signed with the Atlanta Falcons practice squad on November 10. He was released on December 14 but re-signed with the practice squad on January 5, 2005. Following the 2005 preseason, Herron was waived during final roster cuts on September 3.

=== Arena Football League ===
In 2004, Herron played in eight games for the Indiana Firebirds of the Arena Football League, recording 10 tackles, defending one pass, and making eight quarterback hurries. From 2006 to 2007, Herron played at both offensive and defensive line for the Nashville Kats, wearing jersey #99. Starting 11 games in 2006 and playing four games off the bench in 2007, Herron had 20.5 total tackles and four sacks in two seasons. He had one seven-yard touchdown reception in 2006.

== Coaching career ==
In 2008 and 2009, Herron was assistant head coach and defensive coordinator for the Tennessee Valley Vipers of the Arena Football League's minor league af2. He helped the Vipers win the ArenaCup IX title.

== Broadcasting career ==
Herron has worked for the Big Ten Network as a game and studio analyst, NFL Network as an analyst for Arena Football, and NBC Sports as a college football analyst. Since 2013, he has been a college football analyst for the Pac-12 Network. Herron is a college football commentator for Chicago sports radio station WSCR "670 the Score" and Chicago Bears commentator for Chicago TV station WFLD. In addition, he is also a host for the SiriusXM Big Ten Radio channel.

== Personal life ==
In 2003, Herron married Katherine Druley in East Falmouth, Massachusetts. He lived in Dearborn, Michigan, while playing for the Lions.
