= 2012 Illinois Fighting Illini football team =

American college football season

2012 Illinois Fighting Illini football
- Conference: Big Ten Conference
- Leaders Division
- Record: 2–10 (0–8 Big Ten)
- Head coach: Tim Beckman (1st season)
- Co-offensive coordinators: Billy Gonzales (1st season); Chris Beatty (1st season)
- Offensive scheme: Multiple
- Defensive coordinator: Tim Banks (1st season)
- Base defense: 4–3
- Captains: Graham Pocic; Ashante Williams
- Home stadium: Memorial Stadium

2012 Big Ten Conference football standings
	Conf.			Overall
Team	W		L	W		L
Legends Division
No. 25 Nebraska xy	7	–	1	10	–	4
No. 24 Michigan	6	–	2	8	–	5
No. 17 Northwestern	5	–	3	10	–	3
Michigan State	3	–	5	7	–	6
Iowa	2	–	6	4	–	8
Minnesota	2	–	6	6	–	7
Leaders Division
No. 3 Ohio State* x	8	–	0	12	–	0
Penn State*	6	–	2	8	–	4
Wisconsin y$	4	–	4	8	–	6
Purdue	3	–	5	6	–	7
Indiana	2	–	6	4	–	8
Illinois	0	–	8	2	–	10
Championship: Wisconsin 70, Nebraska 31
$ – BCS representative as conference champion; x – Division champion/co-champions; * Ohio State and Penn State ineligible for conference championship game and post-season bowl games due to NCAA sanctions.; Rankings from AP Poll

The 2012 Illinois Fighting Illini football team was an American football team that represented the University of Illinois Urbana-Champaign as a member of the Big Ten Conference during the 2012 NCAA Division I FBS football season. In their first season under head coach Tim Beckman, the Fighting Illini compiled a 2–10 record (0–8 in conference games), finished in last place out of six teams in the Big Ten's Leaders Division, and were outscored by a total of 385 to 200.

The team's statistical leaders included quarterback Nathan Scheelhaase (2,361 passing yards), running back Donovonn Young (571 rushing yards), and wide receiver Ryan Lankford (37 receptions for 469 yards, 30 points scored).

The team played its home games at Memorial Stadium in Champaign, Illinois.

== Schedule ==
Date	Time	Opponent	Site	TV	Result	Attendance
September 1	11:00 am	Western Michigan*	Memorial Stadium; Champaign, IL	ESPNU	W 24–7	43,441
September 8	9:30 pm	at Arizona State*	Sun Devil Stadium; Tempe, AZ	ESPN	L 14–45	54,128
September 15	11:00 am	Charleston Southern*	Memorial Stadium; Champaign, IL	BTN	W 44–0	45,369
September 22	7:00 pm	Louisiana Tech*	Memorial Stadium; Champaign, IL	BTN	L 24–52	46,539
September 29	11:00 am	Penn State	Memorial Stadium; Champaign, IL	ESPN	L 7–35	46,734
October 6	2:30 pm	at Wisconsin	Camp Randall Stadium; Madison, WI	ABC/ESPN2	L 14–31	80,096
October 13	2:30 pm	at No. 25 Michigan	Michigan Stadium; Ann Arbor, MI (rivalry)	ABC/ESPN	L 0–45	110,922
October 27	11:00 am	Indiana^{†}	Memorial Stadium; Champaign, IL (rivalry)	BTN	L 17–31	47,981
November 3	2:30 pm	at No. 6 Ohio State	Ohio Stadium; Columbus, OH (Illibuck)	ESPN	L 22–52	105,311
November 10	2:30 pm	Minnesota	Memorial Stadium; Champaign, IL	BTN	L 3–17	46,912
November 17	2:30 pm	Purdue	Memorial Stadium; Champaign, IL (Purdue Cannon)	BTN	L 17–20	41,974
November 24	11:00 am	at Northwestern	Ryan Field; Evanston, IL (Land of Lincoln Trophy)	BTN	L 14–50	32,415
*Non-conference game; ^{†}Homecoming; Rankings from Coaches' Poll released prior to the game; All times are in Central time

== Roster ==
2012 Illinois Fighting Illini football team roster
Players
Coaches
Offense

Pos.	#	Name	Class
QB	2	Nathan Scheelhaase	Jr
TE	3	Jon Davis	So
QB	4	Reilly O'Toole	So
RB	5	Donovonn Young	So
RB	6	Josh Ferguson	Fr
WR	7	Hayden Daniels	Fr
QB	8	Miles Osei	Jr
QB	10	Chase Haslett	Fr
TE	11	Matt LaCosse	So
WR	12	Ryan Langford	Jr
QB	13	Sean McGushin	Sr
WR	15	Darius Millines	Jr
QB	17	James Nudera	Fr
WR	18	Jeremey Whitlow	Fr
WR	19	Kenny Knight	Fr
WR	20	Fritz Rock	So
WR	21	Devin Church	Fr
RB	22	Dami Ayoola	Fr
WR	24	James Hallendorff	Sr
RB	28	LaKeith Walls	Fr
WR	29	Peter Bonahoom	Fr
WR	31	Leslie Poole	So
WR	34	Davontay Kwaaning	Fr
FB	41	Zach Becker	Sr
TE	47	Tim Clary	So
OL	52	Alex Hill	So
OL	55	Chris Boles	Fr
OL	56	Shawn Afryl	So
OL	60	Tony Durkin	Fr
OL	61	Tyler Sands	Sr
OL	64	Robbie Bain	Fr
OL	66	Scott McDowell	Fr
OL	67	Jake Feldmeyer	Jr
OL	68	Simon Cvijanovic	So
OL	69	Ted Karras	Fr
OL	70	Corey Lewis	Sr
OL	71	Joe Spencer	Fr
OL	72	Hugh Thornton	Sr
OL	73	Chris O'Connor	Fr
OL	74	Michael Heitz	So
OL	75	Pat Flavin	Fr
OL	76	Graham Pocic (C)	Sr
OL	78	Ryan Nowicki	Fr
WR	80	Spencer Harris	Jr
WR	81	Cedric Doxy	Fr
WR	82	Olusuen Arowolaju	Fr
TE	83	Eddie Viliunas	Sr
WR	84	Justin Hardee	Fr
WR	85	Tim Lukas	Jr
TE	86	Tim Russell	Jr
TE	88	Justin Lattimore	Jr
TE	89	Evan Wilson	Jr

Defense

Pos.	#	Name	Class
DB	1	Terry Hawthorne	Sr
DB	2	V'Angelo Bentley	Fr
DB	3	Taylor Barton	Fr
DB	4	Patrick Nixon-Youman	Sr
DB	5	Steve Hull	Jr
DL	6	Darrius Caldwell	Fr
DB	7	Supo Sanni	Sr
DB	9	Earnest Thomas	So
STAR	10	B. J. Bello	Fr
DB	11	Jevaris Little	Fr
DB	17	Tommy Davis	Sr
DB	21	Jack Ramsey	Sr
DB	22	Nick Forzley	So
DB	23	Ben Mathis	Jr
DB	24	Nelson Lugo	Fr
STAR	25	Ashante Williams (C)	Sr
DB	26	Justin Green	Sr
DB	27	Eaton Spencer	Fr
DB	29	Kaeman Mitchell	Jr
LB	30	Houston Bates	So
DB	31	Nick North	Fr
STAR	32	Daniel Quintana	So
LB	33	Zepheniah Grimes	Fr
LB	34	Mike Svetina	Fr
LB	35	Sean White	Fr
DB	37	Austin Abner	Fr
LB	38	Michael Valentino	Fr
LB	39	Nejee Robinson	Jr
LB	40	Beau Sullivan	Jr
LB	42	Ralph Cooper	So
LB	43	Mason Monheim	Fr
DL	44	Austin Teitsma	So
LB	45	Jonathan Brown	Jr
LB	48	Henry Dickinson	So
LB	52	T. J. Neal	Fr
DL	54	Justin Staples	Sr
DL	58	Kenny Nelson	Fr
DL	59	Tim Kynard	Jr
DL	90	DeJazz Woods	So
DL	91	Glenn Foster	Sr
DL	93	Teko Powell	Fr
DL	94	Akeem Spence	Jr
DL	95	Jake Howe	So
DL	97	Vontrell Williams	Fr
DL	98	John Valentine	Fr
DL	99	Michael Buchanan	Sr

Special teams

Pos.	#	Name	Class
PK/P	13	Ryan Frain	Fr
PK	14	Taylor Zalewski	Fr
P	18	Justin DuBernois	So
P	36	Brad Janitz	So
PK	37	Nick Immekus	So
LS	46	Zak Pedersen	Sr
LS	49	Zach Hirth	Fr
PK	83	Brennen VanMieghem	Fr
LS	85	Michael Martin	Fr
P	87	Garrett Stroup	Fr

Head coach

- Tim Beckman

Coordinators/assistant coaches

- Tim Banks (defensive coordinator / safeties)
- Billy Gonzales (co-offensive coordinator / receivers)
- Chris Beatty (co-offensive coordinator / quarterbacks)
- Luke Butkus (offensive line)
- Steve Clinkscale (cornerbacks)
- Keith Gilmore (defensive line)
- Alex Golesh (tight ends / specialist / recruiting coordinator)
- Tim Salem (running backs / special teams coordinator)
- Mike Ward (linebackers)
- Jon Carvin (graduate assistant - offense)
- Justin Hood (graduate assistant - defense)
- Kolby Jackson (graduate assistant - special teams)
- Tim Knox (director of football operations)
- Paul Nichols (director of player personnel)
- Lester Richmond (graduate assistant - defense)
- George Anasis (director of football game analysis)
- Mike Bellamy (associate recruiting coordinator)
- Scott Brooks (head football athletic trainer)
- Trent Chesnut (head football equipment manager)
- Jeff Guin (academic counselor)
- Corey Harbor (academic counselor)
- Aaron Hillmann (head football strength & conditioning coach)
- Carla Suber (learning specialist)
- Annie White (academic counselor)

Legend

- (C) Team captain
- (S) Suspended
- (I) Ineligible
- Injured
- Redshirt

Roster
Last update: July 7, 2012
