= Justin Staples =

American football player (born 1989)

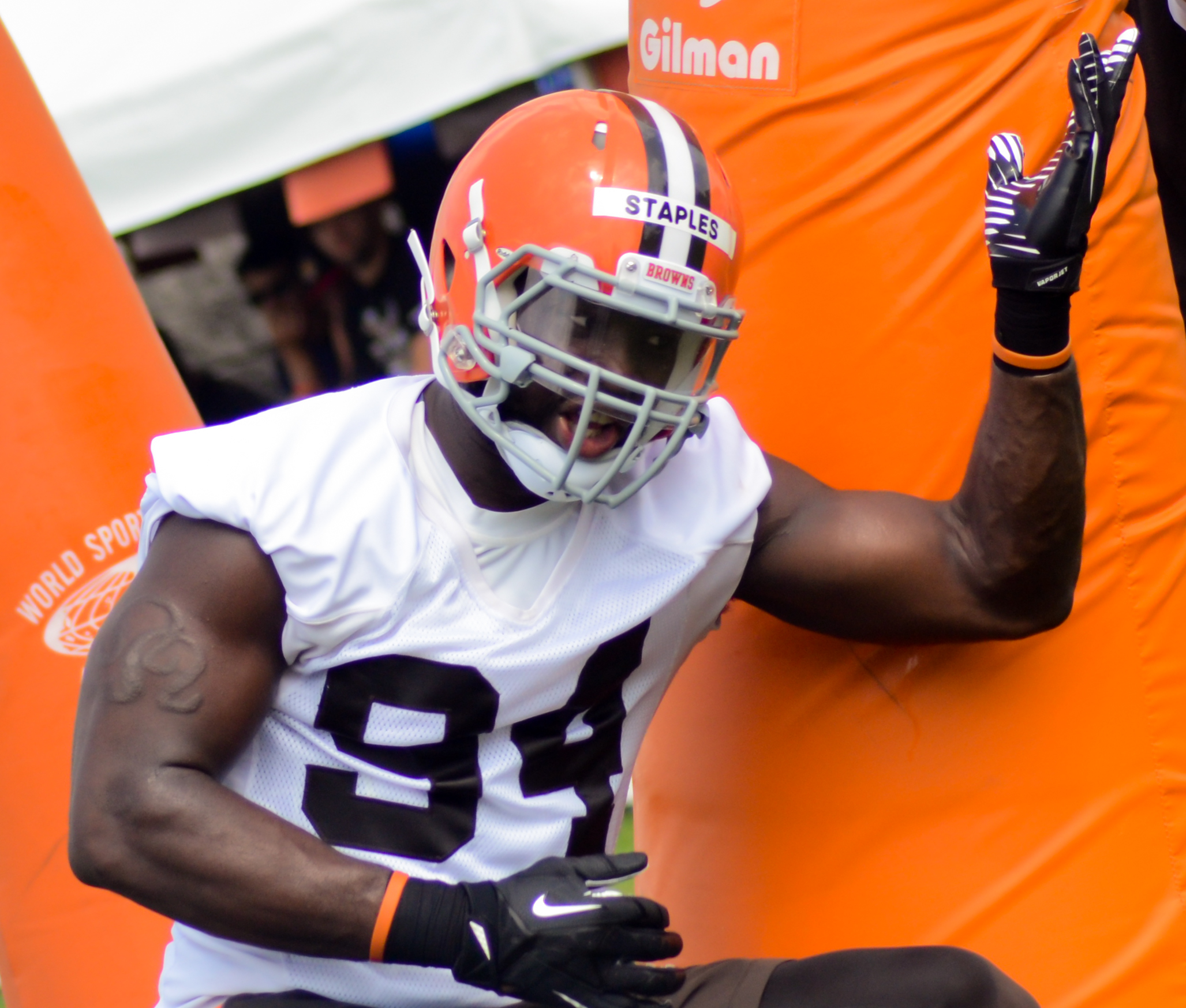
- Staples with the Cleveland Browns in 2014

No. 57, 94
- Position: Linebacker

Personal information
- Born: December 10, 1989 (age 36); Chicago, Illinois, U.S.
- Listed height: 6 ft 4 in (1.93 m)
- Listed weight: 245 lb (111 kg)

Career information
- High school: St. Edward (Lakewood, Ohio)
- College: Illinois (2008–2012)
- NFL draft: 2013: undrafted

Career history
- Cleveland Browns (2013–2014)*; Tennessee Titans (2014–2016)
- * Offseason or practice squad member only

Career NFL statistics
- Total tackles: 9
- Pass deflections: 2
- Stats at Pro Football Reference

Justin Ikeem Staples (born December 10, 1989) is an American former professional football player who was a linebacker in the National Football League (NFL). He played college football for the Illinois Fighting Illini. He played in the NFL for the Cleveland Browns and Tennessee Titans.

== Early life ==
Staples played high school football at St. Edward High School in Lakewood, Ohio. He was named to the Cleveland Plain Dealer All-State team as a linebacker his senior year, recording 92 tackles, seven sacks, one interception, 11 pass break-ups, six forced fumbles and two recovered fumbles. He was also picked for the Big 33 Football Classic, which at the time featured the best Pennsylvania and Ohio seniors.

== College career ==
Staples played at the University of Illinois Urbana-Champaign from 2009 to 2012. He was redshirted in 2008. He played 48 games as a defensive end for the Illini, recording 62 career tackles, 2.5 sacks, three forced fumbles and one fumble recovery. He is also a member of the Omega Psi Phi fraternity

== Professional career ==
Staples was rated the 79th best defensive end in the 2013 NFL draft by NFLDraftScout.com.

Pre-draft measurables
Height	Weight	40-yard dash	10-yard split	20-yard split	20-yard shuttle	Three-cone drill	Vertical jump	Broad jump	Bench press
6 ft 3 in (1.91 m)	242 lb (110 kg)	4.79 s	1.65 s	2.82 s	4.48 s	7.03 s	33 1/2 in (0.85 m)	10 ft 7 in (3.23 m)	21 reps
All values from Illinois Pro Day

=== Cleveland Browns ===
Staples signed with the Cleveland Browns in April 2013 after going undrafted in the 2013 NFL draft. He was released by the Browns on August 31 and signed to the team's practice squad on September 25, 2013. He signed a futures contract with the Browns on December 30, 2103. He was released by the Browns on September 9, 2014.

=== Tennessee Titans ===
Staples was signed to the Tennessee Titans' practice squad on September 16, 2014. He was promoted to the active roster on November 20 and made his NFL debut on November 23, 2014 against the Philadelphia Eagles, recording one tackle. He was released by the Titans on September 6, 2015 and signed to the team's practice squad on September 8, 2015. Staples was promoted to the active roster on October 17, 2015.

On September 2, 2016, Staples was released by the Titans as part of final roster cuts and was signed to the practice squad the next day. He was promoted to the active roster on December 5, 2016.

On September 2, 2017, Staples was released by the Titans.
