= Wes Lunt =

American football player (born 1993)

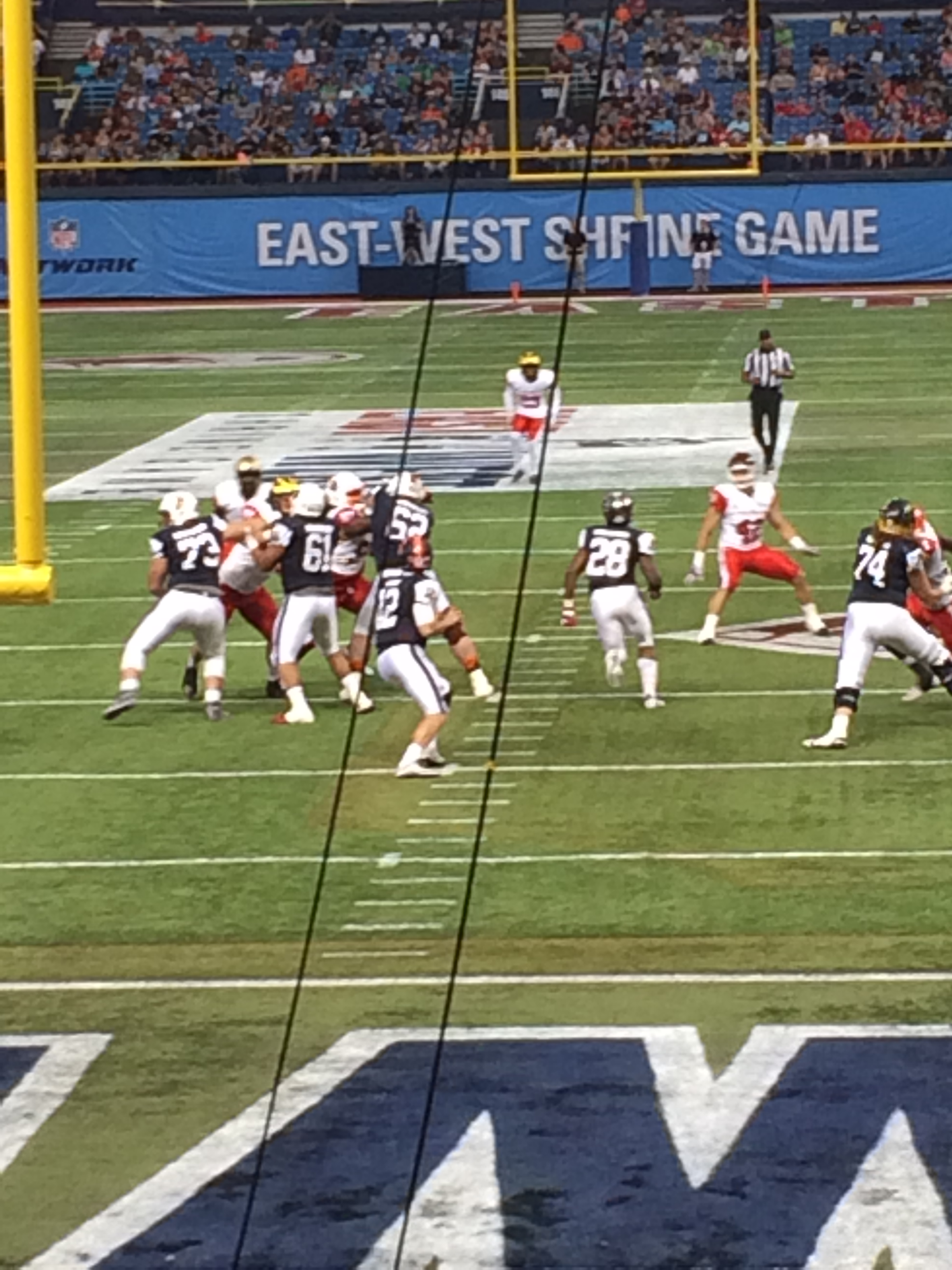
- Lunt (#12) at the 2017 East–West Shrine Game

No. 3
- Position: Quarterback

Personal information
- Born: October 7, 1993 (age 33); Springfield, Illinois, U.S.
- Listed height: 6 ft 5 in (1.96 m)
- Listed weight: 225 lb (102 kg)

Career information
- High school: Rochester (Rochester, Illinois)
- College: Oklahoma State (2012); Illinois (2013–2016)
- NFL draft: 2017: undrafted

Career history
- Minnesota Vikings (2017)*
- * Offseason or practice squad member only
- Stats at Pro Football Reference

Weston Lunt (born October 7, 1993) is an American former football quarterback. He played college football for the Oklahoma State Cowboys and Illinois Fighting Illini. After going undrafted in the 2017 NFL draft, he signed with the Minnesota Vikings of the National Football League (NFL).

== High school ==
During his junior season at Rochester High School in 2010, Lunt led the Rockets to a perfect 14–0 record with a 24–7 victory in the 2010 4A IHSA Football Championship over Alleman High School in Champaign, Illinois at Memorial Stadium.

During his senior season, Lunt completed 253-for-346 (73%) of his passes, and threw 3,651 yards, 31 TDs, and 4 INTs in 10 games in 2011. This gave Lunt career numbers of 478-for-664 (72%) completions, 7,418 yards, 65 TDs, and 8 INTs. In 2011, Lunt led the Rockets to a second straight 4A IHSA Football Championship with a 42–39 victory in the over Richmond-Burton Community High School at Memorial Stadium in Champaign, Illinois. In the state title game, Lunt set an Illinois state title game record, throwing for 506 total yards. In fact, he started a state championship streak that lasted until 2015, winning the Rockets 5 State Championship in row.

Lunt committed to play at the Oklahoma State University saying that he probably would have ended up at the University of Illinois if Reilly O'Toole had not already committed to play at Illinois. Ironically, Lunt would end up transferring to Illinois after his freshman season in Stillwater, Oklahoma where he would become teammates with O'Toole.

Lunt was named a member of the 2011 Illinois All-State Team as selected by the Associated Press, Chicago Tribune, Chicago Sun-Times, News-Gazette, and the Illinois Football Coaches Association. Lunt was also selected to play in the Semper Fidelis All-American Bowl at Chase Field in Phoenix. He was also named the 2011 News-Gazette All-State Player of the Year

College recruiting
Name	Hometown	School	Height	Weight	Commit date
Wes Lunt; QB	Rochester, IL	Rochester (IL)	6 ft 4 in (1.93 m)	190 lb (86 kg)	Jun 19, 2011
Wes Lunt; QB	Recruit ratings: Scout: Rivals: 247Sports: ESPN: (78)				
Overall recruit ranking: Scout: 21 (QB) Rivals: 7 (QB) 247Sports: 12 (QB) ESPN: 42 (QB)
Note: In many cases, Scout, Rivals, 247Sports, On3, and ESPN may conflict in their listings of height and weight.; In these cases, the average was taken. ESPN grades are on a 100-point scale.; Sources: "Oklahoma St. Football Commitment List". Rivals.; "2012 Oklahoma St. Football Commits". Scout.; "Oklahoma State Cowboys". ESPN.; "Scout.com Team Recruiting Rankings". Scout.; "2012 Team Ranking". Rivals.com.; "Oklahoma State 2012 Football Commits". 247Sports.

== College career ==
=== Oklahoma State ===
As a true freshman at Oklahoma State University in 2012, Lunt was named the starting quarterback to open the season. He became the first true freshman to start an opening game for Oklahoma State since 1950 and the first true freshman to start a game since Tone Jones in 1993. Overall, he played in six games and started five, completing 81 of 131 passes for 1,108 yards, six touchdowns and seven interceptions.

=== Illinois ===
After his freshman season, Lunt transferred to the University of Illinois. After sitting out the 2013 season due to transfer rules, Lunt was named the starting quarterback for the 2014 season. In the October 4 game at home against Purdue, Lunt was removed from the game with an apparent leg injury. Upon further tests, it was revealed that Lunt had suffered a fractured fibula in his left leg. The injury kept Lunt sidelined from athletic activities for a few weeks.

=== Statistics ===
Year	Team	Games		Passing								Rushing			
Year	Team	GP	Record	Comp	Att	Pct	Yards	Avg	TD	Int	Rate	Att	Yards	Avg	TD
2012	Oklahoma State	6	3–2	81	131	61.8	1,108	8.5	6	7	137.3	1	-6	-6.0	0
2013	Illinois	DNP													
2014	Illinois	8	3–4	153	241	63.5	1,763	7.3	14	3	141.6	16	-80	-5.0	0
2015	Illinois	12	5–7	270	481	56.1	2,761	5.7	14	6	111.5	24	-153	-6.4	1
2016	Illinois	8	1–6	127	232	54.7	1,376	5.9	8	3	113.4	20	-65	-3.3	0
Career		34	12−19	631	1,085	58.2	7,008	6.5	42	19	121.7	61	-304	-5.0	1

== Professional career ==
Pre-draft measurables
Height	Weight	40-yard dash	10-yard split	20-yard split	20-yard shuttle	Three-cone drill	Vertical jump	Broad jump
6 ft 6 in (1.98 m)	222 lb (101 kg)	4.87 s	1.69 s	2.81 s	4.44 s	7.28 s	29.5 in (0.75 m)	9 ft 1 in (2.77 m)
All values are from Illinois' Pro Day

After going undrafted in the 2017 NFL draft, Lunt signed with the Minnesota Vikings as an undrafted free agent on May 1, 2017. On July 28, 2017, he was waived by the Vikings.

== Personal life ==
Following his brief stint in the NFL, Lunt currently works as an insurance consultant at Troxell.
