= 2000 Illinois Fighting Illini football team =

American college football season

2000 Illinois Fighting Illini football
- Conference: Big Ten Conference
- Record: 5–6 (2–6 Big Ten)
- Head coach: Ron Turner (4th season)
- Offensive scheme: Pro-style
- Defensive coordinator: Tim Kish (4th season)
- Base defense: 4–3
- MVP: Kurt Kittner
- Captains: Ray Redziniak; Muhammad Abdullah; Bobby Jackson; Fred Wakefield
- Home stadium: Memorial Stadium

2000 Big Ten Conference football standings
	Conf.			Overall
Team	W		L	W		L
No. 11 Michigan +	6	–	2	9	–	3
Northwestern +	6	–	2	8	–	4
No. 13 Purdue $+	6	–	2	8	–	4
Ohio State	5	–	3	8	–	4
No. 23 Wisconsin	4	–	4	9	–	4
Minnesota	4	–	4	6	–	6
Penn State	4	–	4	5	–	7
Iowa	3	–	5	3	–	9
Illinois	2	–	6	5	–	6
Michigan State	2	–	6	5	–	6
Indiana	2	–	6	3	–	8
$ – BCS representative as conference champion; + – Conference co-champions; Rankings from AP Poll

The 2000 Illinois Fighting Illini football team was an American football team that represented the University of Illinois at Urbana-Champaign as a member of the Big Ten Conference during the 2000 NCAA Division I-A football season. In their fourth year under head coach Ron Turner, the Fighting Illini compiled a 5–6 record (2–6 in conference games), finished in a three-way tie for ninth place in the Big Ten, and outscored opponents by a total of 294 to 286.

The team's statistical leaders included quarterback Kurt Kittner (1,982 passing yards), running back Antoineo Harris (772 rushing yards, 42 points scored), and wide receiver Greg Lewis (40 receptions for 544 yards).

The team played its home games at Memorial Stadium in Champaign, Illinois.

== Schedule ==
Date	Time	Opponent	Rank	Site	TV	Result	Attendance
September 2	2:30 pm	Middle Tennessee*	No. 21	Memorial Stadium; Champaign, IL		W 35–6	35,032
September 9	9:00 pm	at San Diego State*	No. 21	Qualcomm Stadium; San Diego, CA	ESPN2	W 49–13	26,779
September 16	11:00 am	California*	No. 19	Memorial Stadium; Champaign, IL	ESPN	W 17–15	50,181
September 23	6:30 pm	No. 10 Michigan	No. 17	Memorial Stadium; Champaign, IL (rivalry)	ESPN	L 31–35	72,524
September 30	11:00 am	at Minnesota	No. 22	Hubert H. Humphrey Metrodome; Minneapolis, MN	ESPN	L 10–44	44,462
October 14	1:00 pm	Iowa^{†}		Memorial Stadium; Champaign, IL		W 31–0	62,639
October 21	11:00 am	at Penn State		Beaver Stadium; University Park, PA	ESPN2	L 25–39	96,475
October 28	11:00 am	at Michigan State		Spartan Stadium; East Lansing, MI	ESPN	L 10–14	73,826
November 4	11:00 am	Indiana		Memorial Stadium; Champaign, IL (rivalry)	ESPN Plus	W 42–35	54,283
November 11	3:00 pm	No. 13 Ohio State		Memorial Stadium; Champaign, IL (Illibuck)	ESPN	L 21–24	61,207
November 18	11:00 am	at No. 23 Northwestern		Ryan Field; Evanston, IL (rivalry)	ESPN2	L 23–61	40,658
*Non-conference game; ^{†}Homecoming; Rankings from AP Poll released prior to the game; All times are in Central time

== Rankings ==
Ranking movements Legend: ██ Increase in ranking ██ Decrease in ranking — = Not ranked
	Week																
Poll	Pre	1	2	3	4	5	6	7	8	9	10	11	12	13	14	15	Final
AP	21	21	21	19	19	24	—	—	—	—	—	—	—	—	—	—	—
Coaches Poll	21	20	21	19	17	22	—	—	—	—	—	—	—	—	—	—	—
BCS	Not released									—	—	—	—	—	—	—	Not released

== Roster ==
2000 Illinois Fighting Illini football team roster
Players
Coaches
Offense

Pos.	#	Name	Class
RB	34	Jameel Cook	Sr
G	64	David Diehl	So
QB	15	Kurt Kittner	Jr
WR	17	Greg Lewis	So
WR	6	Brandon Lloyd	So
WR	86	Aaron Moorehead	So
OT	59	Marques Sullivan	Sr
TE	87	Josh Whitman	Sr

Defense

Pos.	#	Name	Class
DE	99	Fred Wakefield	Sr

Special teams

Pos.	#	Name	Class
LS	51	Nathan Hodel	Sr

Head coach

- Ron Turner

Coordinators/assistant coaches

- Craig Ver Steeg (QB/RC)

Legend

- (C) Team captain
- (S) Suspended
- (I) Ineligible
- Injured
- Redshirt

Roster
