= Jason Reda =

American football player (born 1985)

Profile
- Position: placekicker

Personal information
- Born: August 16, 1985 (age 41); Rock Island, Illinois
- Listed height: 6 ft 1 in (1.85 m)
- Listed weight: 200 lb (91 kg)

Career information
- College: Illinois
- NFL draft: 2008: undrafted

Career history
- Cleveland Browns (2008–2009)*
- * Offseason or practice squad member only

Awards and highlights
- Sporting News Freshman All-Big Ten (2004); Lou Groza Award semifinalist (2007)

Jason Gerard Reda (born August 16, 1985) is an American former football placekicker. He was signed by the Cleveland Browns as an undrafted free agent in 2008. He played college football at Illinois.

== College career ==
At Illinois, Reda made 16 of his 18 attempted field goals in his senior year. He made three out of his three attempted +50 yard field goals. He was put on Illinois' All Decade Team and put on the prestigious Top Ten Specialists of All Time list. Jason is the all-time scoring leader for the Fighting Illini, having scored 267 career points between 2004 and 2007.

== Professional career ==
=== Cleveland Browns ===
Reda was undrafted in the 2008 NFL draft. He was signed by the Cleveland Browns on May 1, 2008. He was cut by the Browns on August 30, 2008

After spending the 2008 regular season out of football, Reda was re-signed to a future contract by the Browns on December 30, 2008, only to be waived on February 9, 2009.

=== Later career ===
Reda became the manager of many campus bars on the University of Illinois campus. Such bars include Red Lion, Firehaus, The Clybourne, and later KAMS.

== Criminal controversy ==
Reda pleaded guilty to driving under the influence of alcohol in late 2018, after crashing into a stopped University of Illinois police car in Champaign, Illinois.

On Friday March 4, 2022, Reda was arrested by University of Illinois Police for alleged sexual assault of a campus bar employee on November 13, 2021. He was charged with one count of criminal sexual assault in the Champaign County Court. His case number is 2022CF000264 with bond being set at $25,000. Reda pleaded guilty to a battery charge. The sexual assault charge was dismissed.
