= John Sullivan (linebacker) =

American football player (born 1956)

No. 50
- Position: Linebacker

Personal information
- Born: October 1, 1956 (age 70); Massapequa Park, New York, U.S.
- Listed height: 6 ft 1 in (1.85 m)
- Listed weight: 221 lb (100 kg)

Career information
- High school: John The Baptist
- College: Illinois
- NFL draft: 1979: 6th round, 147th overall pick

Career history
- New York Jets (1979–1980)

Awards and highlights
- First-team All-Big Ten (1977)

Career NFL statistics
- Fumble recoveries: 1
- Stats at Pro Football Reference

John Patrick Sullivan (born October 1, 1956) is an American former professional football player who was a linebacker for the New York Jets in the National Football League (NFL). He played college football for the Illinois Fighting Illini.
