= Nathan Scheelhaase =

American football player and coach (born 1990)

Los Angeles Rams
- Title: Offensive coordinator

Personal information
- Born: November 8, 1990 (age 35); Davenport, Iowa, U.S.

Career information
- Position: Quarterback (No. 2)
- High school: Rockhurst (Kansas City, Missouri)
- College: Illinois (2009–2013)

Career history
- Illinois (2015–2017); Football operations (2015); Running backs coach (2015); Offensive assistant (2016–2017); Iowa State (2018–2023); Running backs coach (2018); Wide receivers coach (2019–2020); Running game coordinator, running backs coach & wide receivers coach (2021–2022); Offensive coordinator & quarterbacks coach (2023); Los Angeles Rams (2024–present); Offensive assistant & passing game specialist (2024); Pass game coordinator (2025); Offensive coordinator (2026–present)

Awards and highlights
- Second-team All-Big Ten (2013); Kraft Fight Hunger Bowl Offensive MVP (2011)
- Coaching profile at Pro Football Reference

Nathan Scheelhaase (/ˈʃiːlhɑːs/ SHEEL-house; born November 8, 1990) is an American professional football coach who is the offensive coordinator for the Los Angeles Rams of the National Football League (NFL). He previously served as pass game coordinator for the Rams, and worked as offensive coordinator and quarterbacks coach at Iowa State University in 2023.

Scheelhaase played college football at Illinois as a quarterback from 2009 to 2013 and has previously served as an assistant coach for the University of Illinois, Iowa State University and Los Angeles Rams.

== Early life and career ==
Scheelhaase attended Rockhurst High School in Kansas City, Missouri. While at Rockhurst, he was a 10-time varsity letterman in football, track, and basketball. Scheelhaase was a four-star prospect on both Scout.com and Rivals.com. He was ranked as the seventh best dual-threat quarterback on Rivals.com. In football, Scheelhaase won the Thomas A. Simone Award as a junior, which is given to the most outstanding high school football player in the Kansas City Metropolitan area. He was the fifth player from Rockhurst to have won the award, and the first since Brandon Shelby in 1999. Scheelhaase also won the Missouri Gatorade Player of the Year for football as a junior while leading Rockhurst to a 13–0 season, and a Missouri Class-6 state championship passing for 1,861 yards, 20 touchdowns, and five interceptions. He also rushed 120 times for 917 yards and 14 scores.

=== College ===
==== Recruiting ====
College recruiting
Name	Hometown	School	Height	Weight	40^{‡}	Commit date
Nathan Scheelhaase; QB	Kansas City, Missouri	Rockhurst High School	6 ft 3 in (1.91 m)	184 lb (83 kg)	4.53	Jul 16, 2008
Nathan Scheelhaase; QB	Recruit ratings: Scout: Rivals:					
Overall recruit ranking: Scout: 20 (QB) Rivals: 7 (QB), 3 (MO)
‡ Refers to 40-yard dash; Note: In many cases, Scout, Rivals, 247Sports, On3, and ESPN may conflict in their listings of height, weight and 40 time.; In these cases, the average was taken. ESPN grades are on a 100-point scale.; Sources: "2009 Team Ranking". Rivals.com.

Scheelhaase committed to the University of Illinois on July 16, 2008. Scheelhaase was recruited by the University of Oklahoma, the University of Missouri, the University of Iowa, the University of Arkansas, and the University of Kansas among others before signing with Illinois. Scheelhaase played safety as a sophomore and said some schools had talked to him about the possibility of playing on defense, but under center is where he wanted to be. "Most everybody is recruiting me at quarterback and that's what I think I'm gonna play."

Scheelhaase was redshirted his freshman year; Illinois started QBs Juice Williams and Eddie McGee.

Scheelhaase became the starting quarterback for the 2010 season. Nathan led Illinois to a 6–6 season; completing 137 passes on 241 attempts for 1,583 yards in the regular season, along with 17 touchdown passes and 8 interceptions. Scheelhaase also ran for 806 yards on 175 carries and 4 touchdowns, and was an excellent complement to Illini RB Mikel Leshoure in the running game.

In the 2010 Texas Bowl against Baylor, Scheelhaase completed 18 passes on 23 attempts for 242 yards with no interceptions. Scheelhaase had a 55-yard touchdown run late in the game, and which helped secure Illinois's first bowl victory in more than a decade, winning 38–14.

==== Statistics ====
Scheelhaase's college stats at the completion of the 2013 season. Source:

		Passing							Rushing			Receiving
Season	Team	Rating	Att	Comp	Pct	Yds	TD	INT	Att	Yds	TD	Rec	Yds	TD
2009	Illinois	Redshirted	–	–	–	–	–	–	–	–	–	–	–	–
2010	Illinois	132.0	264	155	58.7	1,825	17	8	185	868	5	1	23	0
2011	Illinois	133.4	291	184	63.2	2,110	13	8	191	624	6	1	9	0
2012	Illinois	105.9	246	149	60.6	1,361	4	8	125	303	4	0	0	0
2013	Illinois	140.7	430	287	66.7	3,272	21	13	113	271	4	0	0	0
	Totals	130.2	1,231	775	63.0	8,568	55	37	614	2,066	19	2	32	0

==== Records ====
Scheelhaase holds the Illinois Fighting Illini football record for career total offensive yards with 10,634. Other records held by Scheelhaase are the most career passing yards with 8,568, the highest season completion percentage with 66.74% (287–430), and the second most career rushing yards by a quarterback with 2,066.

== Coaching career ==
=== Illinois ===
On May 19, 2015, the University of Illinois announced it had hired Scheelhaase as Assistant Director of Football Operations. He had been offered the same position the previous year, but declined it because of a previous commitment to a youth ministry in Louisville, Kentucky. On August 29, after the firing of Scheelhaase's head coach from his playing days, Tim Beckman, Illinois offensive coordinator Bill Cubit was promoted to interim head coach, which opened up a slot on the Illinois coaching staff, and Scheelhaase was promoted to running backs coach.

=== Iowa State ===
On January 25, 2018, it was announced Scheelhaase was hired as the running backs coach under Matt Campbell at Iowa State. In 2019, he became the wide receivers coach for Iowa State. In 2021, in addition to coaching the wide receivers, Scheelhaase was given the additional titles of running game coordinator and running backs coach. Prior to the 2023 season, he was promoted to offensive coordinator, replacing Tom Manning.

=== Los Angeles Rams ===
On February 19, 2024, Scheelhaase was hired by the Los Angeles Rams as their pass game specialist under head coach Sean McVay. Upon his departure, Cyclones head coach Matt Campbell stated: “Nate is going and will do a great job. Honestly, an opportunity he couldn’t pass up. Love him and will miss him, but truly a great opportunity for him!” On February 20, 2026, Scheelhaase was promoted to offensive coordinator, replacing Mike LaFleur.

== Personal life ==
Scheelhaase and his wife, Morgan, have a son and a daughter.

Scheelhaase's father, Nate Creer, started at cornerback for the University of Iowa, and started for the 1985 team that lost to UCLA in the Rose Bowl to finish 10–2, and be ranked No. 10 at the end of the season AP Poll. He was named as one of Iowa’s all-time team MVPs.
