= Derek Dimke =

American football player (born 1990)

Profile
- Position: Placekicker

Personal information
- Born: April 16, 1990 (age 36); Rockford, Illinois, U.S.
- Listed height: 6 ft 0 in (1.83 m)
- Listed weight: 180 lb (82 kg)

Career information
- High school: Boylan Catholic (Rockford)
- College: Illinois
- NFL draft: 2012: undrafted

Career history
- Detroit Lions (2012)*; New York Jets (2013)*; Tampa Bay Buccaneers (2013)*; New Orleans Saints (2014)*; Jacksonville Jaguars (2015)*
- * Offseason or practice squad member only

Awards and highlights
- Second-team All-Big Ten (2010)
- Stats at Pro Football Reference

Derek Dimke (born April 16, 1990) is an American former professional football player who was a placekicker in the National Football League (NFL). Dimke played college football for the Illinois Fighting Illini, breaking several school records. He was signed by the Detroit Lions in 2012.

== Early life ==
Dimke was born in Rockford, Illinois to Tim, a director within the Rockford Park District, and Debra, a school administrator.

Dimke attended Boylan Catholic High School in Rockford, Illinois. He was selected second-team All-State by the Chicago Tribune and was also a special mention All-State selection by the Champaign News-Gazette. He set an Illinois high school record when he kicked a 54-yard field goal during the playoffs his senior year.

== College career ==
Dimke was a four-year letterman at the University of Illinois Urbana-Champaign. During his career with the Fighting Illini, he made 39 of 46 field goals for a field goal percentage of 84.7%. He also went 89 for 89 on extra point attempts, for a combined field goal and extra point percentage of 94.8%. He is the most accurate kicker in Fighting Illini history. He holds several other school records including most points scored in a season by a kicker, most field goals in a season, most field goals in a bowl game, most consecutive PATs made, and most touchbacks in a single game. Dimke ranks 6th on the Fighting Illini football career scoring list, and 2nd on the single season scoring list. In his junior season, he was a semifinalist for the Lou Groza Award. He led the Big Ten in both field goals per game and touchbacks. He was selected to Phil Steele's first-team All-Big Ten team following the conclusion of his Junior season. He was selected to the Second-team All-Big Ten by the coaches. He also was an Honorable Mention All-Big Ten selection by the media.

Dimke named to the ESPN All-Big Ten Bowl Team for his performance in the 2010 Texas Bowl. In his senior season, he was selected to the Lou Groza Award Preseason Watch List. Dimke led the Fighting Illini in scoring during the 2011 season. During his senior year, he also was an Honorable Mention All-Big Ten selection by coaches & media. He was an Academic All-Big Ten honoree in 2009, 2010, and 2011. He was named Big Ten Special Teams Player of the Week three times (11/30/09), (10/11/10), and (9/26/11) while at Illinois. Following his senior season, he was invited to the NFL Combine.

== Professional career ==
=== Detroit Lions ===
On April 30, 2012, Dimke signed with the Detroit Lions. He went 2 for 2 on field goals during the preseason while battling Jason Hanson for the starting role. On August 27, 2012, he was released.

=== New York Jets ===
Dimke signed with the New York Jets on April 11, 2013. He was released on May 12, 2013.

=== Tampa Bay Buccaneers ===
Dimke was signed by the Tampa Bay Buccaneers on June 4, 2013. During his time there he went 6 for 7 on field goals while battling Lawrence Tynes and Rian Lindell for the starting role. He was later cut on August 31, 2013.

=== New Orleans Saints ===
Dimke was signed by the New Orleans Saints to a futures contract on January 2, 2014. Dimke went 4 for 4 with a long of 49 yards. Dimke along with kicker Shayne Graham were released as part of the final roster cuts on August 30, 2014.

=== Jacksonville Jaguars ===
On January 5, 2015, the Jacksonville Jaguars signed Dimke to a reserve/future contract.

He was released on May 11, 2015.

== Personal life ==
Dimke graduated with a degree in finance in 2012.
