= A. J. Jenkins =

American football player (born 1989)

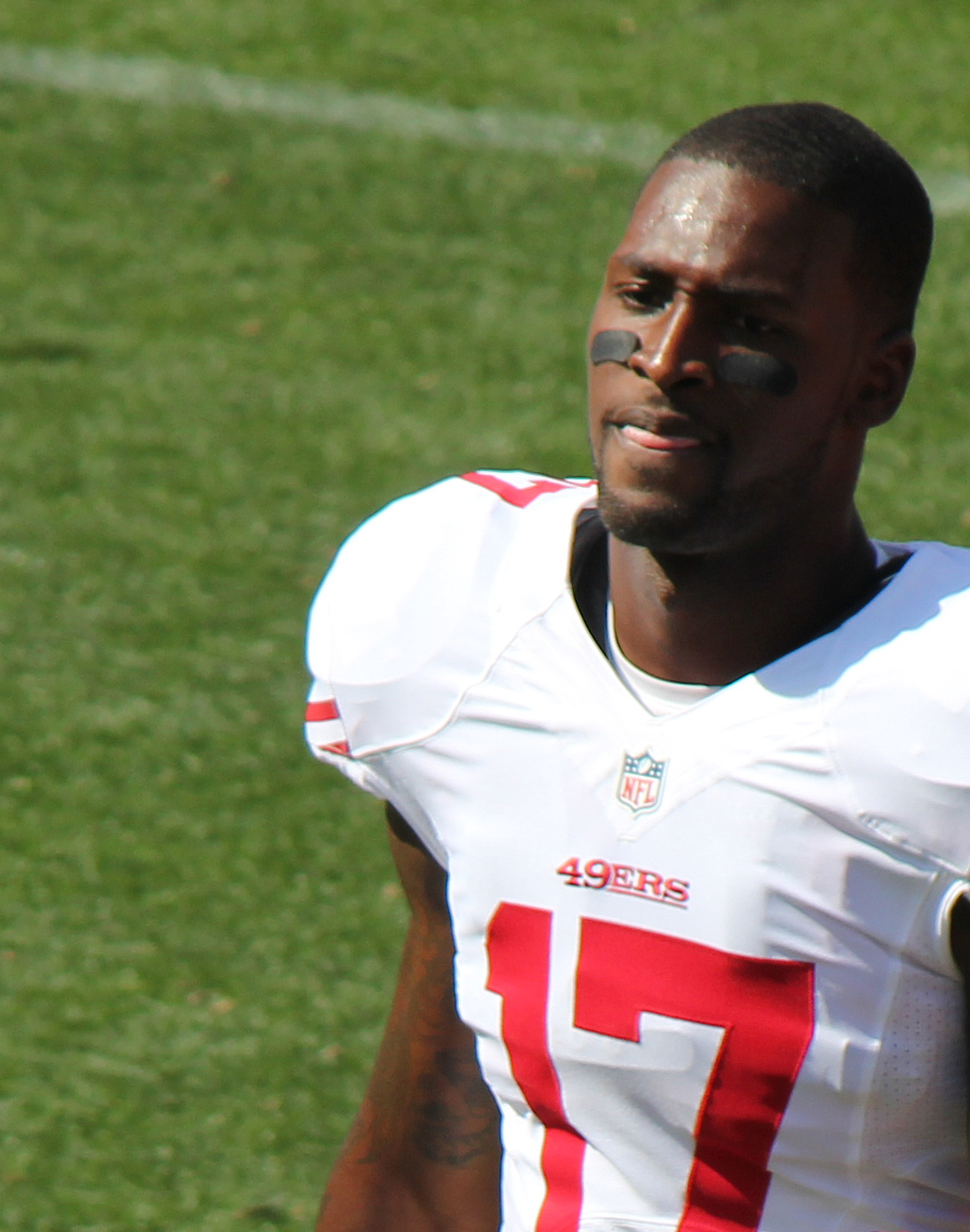
- Jenkins with the San Francisco 49ers in 2012

No. 15, 17
- Position: Wide receiver

Personal information
- Born: September 30, 1989 (age 37); Jacksonville, Florida, U.S.
- Listed height: 6 ft 0 in (1.83 m)
- Listed weight: 200 lb (91 kg)

Career information
- High school: Terry Parker (Jacksonville)
- College: Illinois (2008–2011)
- NFL draft: 2012: 1st round, 30th overall pick

Career history
- San Francisco 49ers (2012); Kansas City Chiefs (2013–2014); Dallas Cowboys (2015)*
- * Offseason or practice squad member only

Awards and highlights
- First-team All-Big Ten (2011)

Career NFL statistics
- Receptions: 17
- Receiving yards: 223
- Stats at Pro Football Reference

Alfred Alonzo "A. J." Jenkins Jr. (born September 30, 1989) is an American former professional football player who was a wide receiver in the National Football League (NFL). He played college football for the Illinois Fighting Illini and was selected by the San Francisco 49ers in the first round of the 2012 NFL draft. He was also a member of the Kansas City Chiefs and Dallas Cowboys.

== Early life ==
Jenkins attended Terry Parker High School in Jacksonville, Florida, where he played on the football team. He finished his junior year with 32 catches for 500 yards, and also rushed for another 251 yards on 40 carries in 2007. As a senior, he hauled in 41 passes for 515 yards, scoring four touchdowns. He was named to Scout.com's Florida Top-50 team. He was ranked the 59th-best recruit in the state of Florida and the No. 53 wide receiver nationally by Rivals.com. He was also named to the Atlanta Journal-Constitution's Super Southern 100 as the 10th-best wide receiver.

He was also a standout sprinter on the track team. In 2006, he posted a personal-best time of 10.75 seconds in the 100-meter dash at the District Meet.

== College career ==
In his first three seasons (2008–2010), he totaled 1,849 all-purpose yards, including 1,156 receiving yards and 694 return yards. On October 1, 2011, he had a career-best performance against Northwestern, with 12 catches for 268 yards and three touchdowns. His performance against Northwestern broke the Illinois single-game receiving record, ranks fourth in Big Ten Conference history, and earned him Big Ten Offensive Player of the Week after the Northwestern game. Through the first 11 games of his senior season, Jenkins had 1,166 receiving yards and seven touchdown receptions.

As of November 20, 2011, Jenkins's 1,166 receiving yards during the 2011 season ranked second in the Big Ten Conference and 11th among NCAA Division I FBS players. At the conclusion of the 2011 season, Jenkins was named First-team All-Big Ten by both the coaches and media.

== Professional career ==
Pre-draft measurables
| Height | Weight | Arm length | Hand span | Wingspan | 40-yard dash | 10-yard split | 20-yard split | 20-yard shuttle | Three-cone drill | Vertical jump | Broad jump | Bench press |
|---|---|---|---|---|---|---|---|---|---|---|---|---|
| 6 ft 0 1/4 in (1.84 m) | 190 lb (86 kg) | 32 3/4 in (0.83 m) | 9 1/2 in (0.24 m) | 6 ft 5 1/2 in (1.97 m) | 4.39 s | 1.57 s | 2.60 s | 4.12 s | 6.73 s | 38.5 in (0.98 m) | 10 ft 4 in (3.15 m) | 12 reps |
All values from NFL Combine/Pro Day

=== San Francisco 49ers ===
The San Francisco 49ers selected Jenkins in the first round (30th overall) of the 2012 NFL draft on April 26, 2012. News of his draft was referenced in that same night's live episode of the NBC sitcom 30 Rock – cast member Cheyenne Jackson performed the show's opening theme song and referenced Jenkins having just been drafted to prove the show was airing live on the west coast. On June 20, the 49ers signed Jenkins to a four-year, $6.94 million contract.

Although healthy his entire rookie season, Jenkins was active for only three of the 49ers' 16 regular season games. He played on only 37 offensive snaps and was targeted with a pass just once, which he dropped.

The 49ers reached Super Bowl XLVII at the end of the 2012 season. He appeared in the game but recorded no meaningful statistics as the 49ers fell to the Baltimore Ravens by a score of 34–31.

=== Kansas City Chiefs ===
On August 19, 2013, Jenkins was traded to the Kansas City Chiefs in exchange for wide receiver Jon Baldwin. During a Thursday Night Football game on September 19, against the Philadelphia Eagles, Jenkins recorded his first career reception, thrown by former 49ers teammate Alex Smith. The reception was good for six yards. His first reception came 511 days after he was drafted.

On February 17, 2015, Jenkins was released by the Chiefs.

=== Dallas Cowboys ===
On May 26, 2015, Jenkins was signed by the Dallas Cowboys. He was released by the Cowboys prior to the start of the regular season on September 5.
