= Walter Young (American football) =

American football player (born 1979)

No. 83, 18
- Position: Wide receiver

Personal information
- Born: December 7, 1979 (age 46); Chicago Heights, Illinois, U.S.
- Listed height: 6 ft 4 in (1.93 m)
- Listed weight: 220 lb (100 kg)

Career information
- High school: Rich East (Park Forest, Illinois)
- College: Illinois
- NFL draft: 2003: 7th round, 226th overall pick

Career history
- Carolina Panthers (2003); Pittsburgh Steelers (2004–2006); → Frankfurt Galaxy (2006)

Awards and highlights
- Super Bowl champion (XL)

Career NFL statistics
- Receiving yards: 17
- Receptions: 1
- Games played: 9
- Stats at Pro Football Reference

Walter Lee Young Jr. (born December 7, 1979) is an American former professional football player who was a wide receiver for the Carolina Panthers and Pittsburgh Steelers of the National Football League (NFL). He was selected by the Panthers in the seventh-round pick of the 2003 NFL draft. He played college football for the Illinois Fighting Illini.

== Early life ==
Born in Chicago Heights, Illinois, Young attended Rich East High School in Park Forest, Illinois, where he earned all-state honors as a quarterback.

== College career ==
=== Football ===
Originally a quarterback, Young switched to wide receiver as a redshirt sophomore at the University of Illinois Urbana-Champaign in 2000. Starting seven games that year, Young finished the season with 27 receptions for 403 yards. As a junior, Young started 11 games and finished second on the team with 50 catches for 890 yards and eight touchdowns, while averaging a team-leading 17.8 yards per catch. In his senior year of 2002, Young started 12 games and again ranked second on the team with 56 catches for 822 yards and six touchdowns. Young finished his college career ranking third on the Illini all-time list with 2,382 receiving yards and 15 touchdown receptions, and fifth with 147 receptions.

=== Basketball ===
As a college player at Illinois, Young also played on the Fighting Illini basketball team. As a junior (2001–02), Young played in two games for the basketball team, managing to score two points in a game against Wisconsin. Young became the first Fighting Illini athlete since 1973 to appear in games for both the football and basketball teams in the same season.

== Professional career ==
=== Carolina Panthers ===
Young was chosen in the seventh round of the 2003 NFL draft by the Carolina Panthers. He played in seven games in 2003 and was targeted five times but did not record a catch. He also made two solo tackles. Young was placed on injured reserve on December 20, 2003. He was waived by the Panthers on August 31, 2004.

=== Pittsburgh Steelers ===
Young was signed to the practice squad of the Pittsburgh Steelers on September 7, 2004. He signed a reserve/future contract with the Steelers on January 27, 2005. He was waived on August 29, 2005, and signed to the team's practice squad on September 5, 2005. Young re-signed with the Steelers on February 16, 2006.

Young was then allocated to NFL Europe, where he played for the Frankfurt Galaxy during the 2006 season. He finished the regular season as the team's second-leading receiver, with 31 receptions for 370 yards and 3 touchdowns in 10 games.

He was waived by the Steelers on September 2, 2006, and signed to the team's practice squad on September 12. He was promoted to the active roster on November 25, 2006, and played in two games with the Steelers that year, recording his first—and only—career NFL catch (17 yards from Ben Roethlisberger). Young was waived on December 23 and signed to the Steelers' practice squad on December 27, 2006.

Young signed a reserve/future contract with the Steelers on January 3, 2007. He was waived on September 1, 2007.

== Personal life ==
Young currently works in trade show operations for GCJ Management.
