= Dana Howard =

American football player (born 1972)

No. 50, 95
- Position: Linebacker

Personal information
- Born: February 27, 1972 (age 54); East St. Louis, Illinois, U.S.
- Listed height: 6 ft 0 in (1.83 m)
- Listed weight: 238 lb (108 kg)

Career information
- High school: East St. Louis Senior
- College: Illinois (1990–1994)
- NFL draft: 1995: 5th round, 168th overall pick

Career history
- Dallas Cowboys (1995)*; St. Louis Rams (1995); Chicago Bears (1996–1997); Philadelphia Eagles (1999)*; →Amsterdam Admirals (1999)
- * Offseason or practice squad member only

Awards and highlights
- Butkus Award (1994); Jack Lambert Award (1994); Unanimous All-American (1994); First-team All-American (1993); 2× Big Ten Defensive Player of the Year (1993, (Note: Co-winner this season with Dan Wilkinson) 1994); 2× First-team All-Big Ten (1993, 1994); 2× Second-team All-Big Ten (1991, 1992)

Career NFL statistics
- Tackles: 1
- Fumble recoveries: 1
- Stats at Pro Football Reference
- College Football Hall of Fame

Dana Cortez Howard (born February 27, 1972) is an American former professional football player who was a linebacker in the National Football League (NFL) for the St. Louis Rams and the Chicago Bears. He played college football for the Illinois Fighting Illini and was selected by the Dallas Cowboys in the fifth round of the 1995 NFL draft.

== Early life ==
Howard was born in East St. Louis, Illinois. He had an inauspicious beginning in football, being cut by his head coach in junior high.

He attended East St. Louis High School, where he played both linebacker and tight end for the Flyers high school football team coached by Bob Shannon. As a senior, he helped the school win the 6A state title, while receiving Parade All-America and All-state honors. In track he once threw the shot put 60'.

== College career ==
Howard accepted a football scholarship from the University of Illinois, where he became a four-year starter. After being redshirted because the team had starter Darrick Brownlow at middle linebacker, in his freshman season he posted 134 tackles (conference record) and 4 sacks. He made a career-high 24 total tackles and a school record 20 solo tackles against Ohio State University. He had 23 tackles against the University of Michigan.

From the start of his sophomore season he was a member of a talented linebacker corps that included fellow standouts Kevin Hardy, Simeon Rice and John Holecek. He registered 138 tackles and 4 forced fumbles. He had 18 tackles against the University of Michigan and 17 against Ohio State University.

As a junior, he had 123 tackles and 4 passes defensed. He made 17 tackles against the University of Minnesota.

As a senior in 1994, he recorded career-highs in tackles (141), tackles for loss (9), fumble recoveries (4) and interceptions (2), while also making 3 sacks and 2 forced fumbles. He tallied 18 tackles against Purdue University and the University of Michigan. He was recognized as a consensus first-team All-American that season, becoming the first Illini player to win the Dick Butkus Award and Jack Lambert Award, both presented annually to the best linebacker in college football.

He was the first player in school history to register at least 100 tackles in each of his four seasons, to lead the team in tackles for four straight years and he also finished as the all-time leading tackler in school and conference history with 595.

In 2017, he was inducted into the St. Louis Sports Hall of Fame. In 2018, he was inducted into the College Football Hall of Fame. In 2018, he was inducted into the Illinois Athletics Hall of Fame.

== Professional career ==
Pre-draft measurables
Height	Weight	Arm length	Hand span	Bench press
6 ft 0 3/8 in (1.84 m)	244 lb (111 kg)	30 7/8 in (0.78 m)	8 5/8 in (0.22 m)	16 reps

=== Dallas Cowboys ===
Howard was selected by the Dallas Cowboys in the fifth round (168th overall) of the 1995 NFL draft, after dropping because of size concerns. He was waived on August 27.

=== St. Louis Rams ===
On August 28, 1995, he was signed by the St. Louis Rams. He played in 16 games as a rookie. He was released on August 20, 1996.

=== Chicago Bears ===
On November 6, 1996, he signed with the Chicago Bears, playing in three games before breaking a finger and being placed on the injured reserve list. He wasn't re-signed at the end of the year.

=== Philadelphia Eagles ===
On February 11, 1999, he was signed by the Philadelphia Eagles. He was allocated to the Amsterdam Admirals of NFL Europe in the offseason. He was cut on September 4.

== Personal life ==
He is the owner of Zoie LLC DBA Dana Howard Construction Company based in Belleville, Illinois.

In November 2024 Howard was indicted by a federal grand jury on fraud charges related to the covid Paycheck Protection Program.
