= Jon Beutjer =

American gridiron football player (born 1980)

No. 17
- Position: Quarterback

Personal information
- Born: August 15, 1980 (age 46); Wheaton, Illinois, U.S.
- Listed height: 6 ft 5 in (1.96 m)
- Listed weight: 220 lb (100 kg)

Career information
- High school: Wheaton Warrenville South
- College: Illinois
- NFL draft: 2005: undrafted

Career history
- Hamilton Tiger-Cats (2005–2006); Tampa Bay Storm (2008); Colorado Crush (2008–2009); Team Michigan (2008)
- Stats at ArenaFan.com

Jon Beutjer (born August 15, 1980) is an American former football quarterback. As a senior at Wheaton Warrenville South High School he threw for a then-national high school record of 60 touchdowns in a 14-game season, winning several Illinois High School Player of the Year honors in the process. He began his college football career at the University of Iowa, ending Iowa's 19-game losing streak with a victory over Michigan State during the 2000 season. Beutjer joined the Iowa basketball team as a walk-on, seeing very limited action in six games during the 2000–01 season. During the summer of 2001, Beutjer with roommate and fellow football teammate Sam Aiello got in a dispute over a cable bill, which resulted in Beutjer being knocked unconscious in a parking lot. Beutjer wound up transferring to the University of Illinois at Urbana-Champaign. After sitting out the 2001 season per NCAA transfer rules, he played for the Illini during the 2002 and 2003 seasons. He was granted a 6th year of eligibility in 2004, where he split playing time with sophomore Brad Bower. After finishing his college football career, Beutjer played in the Arena Football League and Canadian Football League. In 2008, he signed on with the All American Football League for Team Michigan. However, as of 2011 the league has not gotten off the ground. He now works as a physical education teacher and is the current head football coach at Lyons Township High School in LaGrange, IL and announced on December 9, 2013, that he is expecting his first child.
