= 2001 Iowa Hawkeyes football team =

American college football season

2001 Iowa Hawkeyes football

Alamo Bowl champion

Alamo Bowl, W 19–16 vs. Texas Tech
- Conference: Big Ten Conference
- Record: 7–5 (4–4 Big Ten)
- Head coach: Kirk Ferentz (3rd season)
- Offensive coordinator: Ken O'Keefe (3rd season)
- Offensive scheme: Pro-style
- Defensive coordinator: Norm Parker (3rd season)
- Base defense: 4–3
- MVPs: Ladell Betts; Bob Sanders
- Captains: Ladell Betts; Aaron Kampman; Kyle McCann; Derek Pagel; Matt Stockdale
- Home stadium: Kinnick Stadium

2001 Big Ten Conference football standings
	Conf.			Overall
Team	W		L	W		L
No. 12 Illinois $	7	–	1	10	–	2
No. 20 Michigan	6	–	2	8	–	4
Ohio State	5	–	3	7	–	5
Iowa	4	–	4	7	–	5
Purdue	4	–	4	6	–	6
Penn State	4	–	4	5	–	6
Indiana	4	–	4	5	–	6
Michigan State	3	–	5	7	–	5
Wisconsin	3	–	5	5	–	7
Minnesota	2	–	6	4	–	7
Northwestern	2	–	6	4	–	7
$ – BCS representative as conference champion; Rankings from AP Poll

The 2001 Iowa Hawkeyes football team represented the University of Iowa as a member of the Big Ten Conference during the 2001 NCAA Division I-A football season. Led by third-year head coach Kirk Ferentz, the Hawkeyes compiled an overall record of 7–5 with a mark of 4–4 in conference play, placing in a four-way tie for fourth in the Big Ten. Iowa was invited to the Alamo Bowl, where the Hawkeyes defeated Texas Tech. The team played home games at Kinnick Stadium in Iowa City, Iowa.

== Leading up to the season ==
=== Previous season ===
Iowa opened the 2000 season with five straight losses, adding to a losing streak that totaled 13 games when the Hawkeyes lost to Indiana on September 30, 2000. However, the streak came to an end a week later, when the Hawks defeated Michigan State, 21–16, giving Ferentz his first ever Big Ten win as head coach at Iowa. Following a three-game losing streak, the Hawkeyes traveled to State College, Pennsylvania, for a game against Penn State. The Hawks won the game, 26–23, and followed it up the next week with another win, this time over Northwestern. The 27–17 victory gave Iowa a two-game winning streak, something that had not occurred for the Hawkeyes since the 1997 season. Iowa finished the season with a 27–24 loss on November 18, 2000, against Minnesota.

== Schedule ==
Date	Time	Opponent	Site	TV	Result	Attendance
September 1	11:00 am	Kent State*	Kinnick Stadium; Iowa City, IA	ESPN Plus	W 51–0	56,091
September 8	11:00 am	Miami University*	Kinnick Stadium; Iowa City, IA	ESPN Plus	W 44–19	58,291
September 29	11:00 am	Penn State^{†}	Kinnick Stadium; Iowa City, IA	ESPN	W 24–18	69,422
October 6	11:00 am	at No. 21 Purdue	Ross–Ade Stadium; West Lafayette, IN	ESPN	L 14–23	58,888
October 13	11:00 am	at Michigan State	Spartan Stadium; East Lansing, MI	ESPN2	L 28–31	73,680
October 20	11:00 am	Indiana	Kinnick Stadium; Iowa City, IA	ESPN Plus	W 42–28	68,295
October 27	2:30 pm	No. 8 Michigan	Kinnick Stadium; Iowa City, IA	ABC	L 26–32	70,397
November 3	11:00 am	at Wisconsin	Camp Randall Stadium; Madison, WI (rivalry)	ESPN Plus	L 28–34	79,421
November 10	11:00 am	at Northwestern	Ryan Field; Evanston, IL	ESPN Plus	W 59–16	36,458
November 17	12:00 pm	Minnesota	Kinnick Stadium; Iowa City, IA (rivalry)		W 42–24	65,491
November 24	11:30 am	at Iowa State*	Jack Trice Stadium; Ames, IA (rivalry)	FSN	L 14–17	51,042
December 29	2:30 pm	vs. Texas Tech*	Alamodome; San Antonio, TX (Alamo Bowl)	ESPN	W 19–16	65,232
*Non-conference game; ^{†}Homecoming; Rankings from AP Poll released prior to the game; All times are in Central time

=== Season outlook ===
2001 was marked as a potential turning point for the Hawkeyes, a year in which a bowl berth was entirely possible. The Hawks returned two potential starters at quarterback in Kyle McCann and Jon Beutjer, and even received playing time from junior college transfer Brad Banks during the season. Ladell Betts and Kahlil Hill came back for their senior seasons at the running back and wide receiver positions respectively. Hill would go on win the Mosi Tatupu Award following the completion of the season.

On defense, the Hawkeyes looked to improve on their rushing defense numbers from the previous season. In 2000, Iowa gave up 194.3 yards rushing, ninth in the Big Ten. Aaron Kampman returned for his senior season on the defensive line, while fellow senior Mike Dolezal looked to replace LeVar Woods and Derrick Davison at linebacker. Iowa's passing defense in 2000 allowed 247 yards passing a game, tenth in the Big Ten. It was thought that added experience in that area would help improve that aspect of Iowa's defense.

The special teams returned Hill and sophomore Nate Kaeding, who hit 14-of-22 field goals and 20-of-20 extra points during his freshman season. In 2000, Hill finished second in the Big Ten with a 27.2-yard kickoff return average. Hill was also named to the first-team all-Big Ten team by the Sporting News for his 2000 performances.

== Game summaries ==
=== Kent State ===
Kent State at Iowa

Team	1	2	3	4	Total
Golden Flashes	0	0	0	0	0
• Hawkeyes	10	13	14	14	51

- Date: September 1
- Location: Kinnick Stadium
  Iowa City, IA
- Game start: 11:00 AM CDT
- Game attendance: 56,091
- TV announcers (ESPN+): Mike Gleason
- Sources: Scoring Summary

Scoring summary
1	9:35	Iowa	Jeremy Allen 14-yard run (Nate Kaeding kick)	Iowa 7–0
1	2:11	Iowa	Nate Kaeding 37-yard field goal	Iowa 10–0
2	6:04	Iowa	Nate Kaeding 31-yard field goal	Iowa 13–0
2	5:23	Iowa	Aaron Greving 15-yard run (Nate Kaeding kick)	Iowa 20–0
2	0:03	Iowa	Nate Kaeding 30-yard field goal	Iowa 23–0
3	9:30	Iowa	Aaron Greving 2-yard run (Nate Kaeding kick)	Iowa 30–0
3	5:12	Iowa	Aaron Greving 1-yard run (Nate Kaeding kick)	Iowa 37–0
4	7:18	Iowa	Siaka Massaquoi 4-yard run (Nate Kaeding kick)	Iowa 44–0
4	3:04	Iowa	Fred Russell 13-yard run (Nate Kaeding kick)	Iowa 51–0

Opening the season on September 1, 2001, the Hawkeyes defeated the Kent State Golden Flashes, 51–0, in front of 56,091 fans at Kinnick Stadium. The win was Iowa's first in a season opener under Ferentz, and it improved the Hawkeyes' record in season openers to 80–31–2.

On offense, Betts ran for 99 yards, while fellow running back Aaron Greving scored three touchdowns. In total, Iowa ran for 331 yards, which compared favorably to the 113 yards for Kent State. Jeremy Allen and Fred Russell also contributed, with 73 and 46 rushing yards respectively. Allen also scored the first touchdown of his career during the game, on a 14-yard run during the first quarter. Defensively, the Hawkeyes held Kent State to 13 first downs and 203 total offensive yards. Iowa held the Golden Flashes to 90 yards passing; Kent State quarterback Jeff Valentino completed 3 of his 13 passes for 35 yards before being taken out of the game. McCann and Banks threw for 165 and 71 yards respectively, while Dallas Clark led the Hawks in receiving, with five catches for 84 yards. The loss was Kent State's sixth straight, dating back to the previous season.

For Iowa, the win capped a week in which Beutjer, a possible starter at quarterback, left the team. Beutjer cited feeling "betrayed" by Iowa coaches, and Iowa player Bruce Nelson said that it would not "disrupt what we've got going." Following the game, Ferentz noted that practice on the Thursday before the game was the best in his tenure at Iowa, while Kent State head coach Dean Pees expressed disappointment in his team's performance. The next week, Kent State ended their six-game losing streak with a 38–17 victory over Bucknell.

=== Miami University ===
Miami (Ohio) at Iowa

Team	1	2	3	4	Total
RedHawks	0	0	13	6	19
• Hawkeyes	17	7	20	0	44

- Date: September 8
- Location: Kinnick Stadium
  Iowa City, IA
- Game start: 11:00 AM CDT
- Game attendance: 58,291
- Television network: ESPN+
- Sources: Box Score and Game Recap

Scoring summary
1	10:06	Iowa	Jeremy Allen 15-yard pass from Kyle McCann (Kaeding kick)	Iowa 7–0
1	6:07	Iowa	Kahlil Hill 52-yard pass from Kyle McCann (Kaeding kick)	Iowa 14–0
1	1:53	Iowa	Nate Kaeding 36-yard field goal	Iowa 17–0
2	0:05	Iowa	Brad Banks 5-yard run (Kaeding kick)	Iowa 24–0
3	12:52	Iowa	De'Von Clark 18-yard pass from Kyle McCann (Kaeding kick)	Iowa 31–0
3	9:45	Iowa	De'Von Clark 32-yard pass from Kyle McCann (Kaeding kick)	Iowa 37–0
3	7:50	Iowa	Chris Smith 32-yard interception return (Kaeding kick)	Iowa 44–0
3	6:58	M (OH)	Ben Roethlisberger 80-yard run (PAT failed)	Iowa 44–6
3	3:56	M (OH)	Michael Larkin 56-yard pass from Ben Roethlisberger (Parseghian kick)	Iowa 44–13
4	0:25	M (OH)	Matt Brandt 40-yard pass from Ben Roethlisberger (PAT failed)	Iowa 44–19

Behind a career-high 4 touchdown passes from Kyle McCann, Iowa built a 44–0 lead by the midway point of the third quarter. Miami quarterback Ben Roethlisberger stopped the shutout with an 80-yard TD run, then followed that with two TD passes.

=== Penn State ===
Penn State at Iowa

Team	1	2	3	4	Total
Nittany Lions	0	5	6	7	18
• Hawkeyes	7	14	0	3	24

- Date: September 29
- Location: Kinnick Stadium, Iowa City, IA
- Game start: 11:00 AM CST
- Game attendance: 69,422
- TV announcers (ESPN): Steve Levy and Todd Christensen
- Source: Box Score

Scoring summary
1	3:06	IOWA	Ladell Betts 1-yard run (Kaeding kick)	Iowa 7–0
2	13:48	PSU	Robbie Gould 37-yard field goal	Iowa 7–3
2	6:48	IOWA	Ladell Betts 2-yard run (Kaeding kick)	Iowa 14–3
2	2:22	PSU	Safety	Iowa 14–5
2	0:25	IOWA	Kahlil Hill 13-yard pass from Kyle McCann (Kaeding kick)	Iowa 21–5
3	5:28	PSU	Bryant Johnson 10-yard pass from Zack Mills (two-point conversion failed)	Iowa 21–11
4	12:48	IOWA	Nate Kaeding 47-yard field goal	Iowa 24–11
4	3:14	PSU	Larry Johnson 15-yard blocked punt return (Gould kick)	Iowa 24–18

=== at No. 21 Purdue ===
Iowa at Purdue

Team	1	2	3	4	Total
Hawkeyes	7	0	7	0	14
• Boilermakers	7	6	0	10	23

- Date: October 6
- Location: Ross–Ade Stadium, West Lafayette, IN
- Game start: 11:11 AM CDT
- Elapsed time: 3:14
- Game attendance: 58,888
- Referee: Steve Newman
- Source: Box Score

Scoring summary
1	9:36	Pur	A. Woodyard 86-yard interception return (Dorsch kick)	Purdue 7–0
1	4:41	Iowa	Jeremy Allen 8-yard pass from Kyle McCann (Kaeding kick)	Tied 7–7
2	8:38	Pur	Travis Dorsch 39-yard field goal	Purdue 10–7
2	1:47	Pur	Travis Dorsch 42-yard field goal	Purdue 13–7
3	6:38	Iowa	Kahlil Hill 7-yard pass from Kyle McCann (Kaeding kick)	Iowa 14–13
4	12:07	Pur	Brandon Hance 4-yard run (Dorsch kick)	Purdue 20–14
4	1:38	Pur	Travis Dorsch 37-yard field goal	Purdue 23–14

In what ended up being the Hawks' most lopsided loss of the season (9 points), Iowa was left to wonder what might have been after their opening drive. Iowa entered the red zone, but an 86-yard pick six opened the scoring for Purdue and had Iowa playing from behind for most of the day.

=== at Michigan State ===
Iowa at Michigan State

Team	1	2	3	4	Total
Hawkeyes	0	21	0	7	28
• Spartans	14	14	0	3	31

- Date: October 13
- Location: Spartan Stadium, East Lansing, MI
- Game start: 12:10 AM EDT
- Elapsed time: 3:33
- Game attendance: 73,680
- Referee: James Lapetina
- Source: Box Score

Scoring summary
1	9:06	MSU	T. J. Duckett 6-yard run (Rayner kick)	Mich St 7–0
1	5:27	MSU	Charles Rogers 13-yard pass from Jeff Smoker (Rayner kick)	Mich St 14–0
2	13:36	Iowa	Kyle McCann 1-yard run (Kaeding kick)	Mich St 14–7
2	9:42	MSU	Herb Haygood 15-yard pass from Jeff Smoker (Rayner kick)	Mich St 21–7
2	5:51	Iowa	Chris Oliver 3-yard pass from Kyle McCann (Kaeding kick)	Mich St 21–14
2	5:34	MSU	Herb Haygood 100-yard kickoff return (Rayner kick)	Mich St 28–14
2	1:30	Iowa	Ladell Betts 1-yard run (Kaeding kick)	Mich St 28–21
4	10:39	MSU	Dave Rayner 22-yard field goal	Mich St 31–21
4	0:06	Iowa	Kyle McCann 1-yard run (Kaeding kick)	Mich St 31–28

=== Indiana ===
Indiana at Iowa

Team	1	2	3	4	Total
Hoosiers	7	14	0	7	28
• Hawkeyes	21	7	7	7	42

- Date: October 20
- Location: Kinnick Stadium, Iowa City, IA
- Game start: 11:00 AM CST
- Game attendance: 68,295
- TV announcers (ESPN+): Wayne Larrivee, Randy Wright, and Jim Barber

Scoring summary
1	13:15	IOWA	Kahlil Hill 75-yard pass from Kyle McCann (Kaeding kick)	Iowa 7–0
1	6:54	Indiana	Levron Williams 2-yard run (Braucher kick)	Tied 7–7
1	2:27	IOWA	Aaron Greving 9-yard run (Kaeding kick)	Iowa 14–7
1	0:29	IOWA	C.J. Jones 59-yard pass from Kyle McCann (Kaeding kick)	Iowa 21–7
2	8:33	Indiana	Antwaan Randle El 1-yard run (Braucher kick)	Iowa 21–14
2	6:11	IOWA	Aaron Greving 9-yard run (Kaeding kick)	Iowa 28–14
2	1:45	Indiana	Levron Williams 5-yard run (Braucher kick)	Iowa 28–21
3	6:30	IOWA	Ladell Betts 5-yard run (Kaeding kick)	Iowa 35–21
4	11:35	Indiana	Antwaan Randle El 6-yard run (Braucher kick)	Iowa 35–28
4	7:31	IOWA	Kahlil Hill 13-yard pass from Kyle McCann (Kaeding kick)	Iowa 42–28

Ladell Betts ran for 172 yards and a touchdown, and Kahlil Hill had 93 yards receiving and two touchdowns in the Hawkeye victory over Indiana.

=== Michigan ===
Michigan at Iowa

Team	1	2	3	4	Total
• Wolverines	0	7	14	11	32
Hawkeyes	0	10	10	6	26

- Date: October 27
- Location: Kinnick Stadium, Iowa City, IA
- Game start: 2:35 PM CDT
- Elapsed time: 3:25
- Game attendance: 70,397
- Game weather: 43 °F (6 °C), Clear, Wind 5 mph (8.0 km/h)
- Referee: S. Pamon
- Television network: ABC

Scoring summary
2	13:36	IOWA	Dallas Clark 5-yard pass from Brad Banks (Nate Kaeding kick)	Iowa 7–0
2	3:43	IOWA	Nate Kaeding 26-yard field goal	IOWA 10–0
2	1:42	Mich	Roy Manning blocked punt recovered in end zone (Epstein kick)	Iowa 10–7
3	13:12	IOWA	C.J. Jones 65-yard punt return (Kaeding kick)	Iowa 17–7
3	9:35	IOWA	Nate Kaeding 40-yard field goal	IOWA 20–7
3	5:56	Mich	Chris Perry 3-yard run (Epstein kick)	Iowa 20–14
3	0:38	Mich	Marquis Walker 6-yard pass from John Navarre (Epstein kick)	Mich 21–20
4	12:56	IOWA	Ladell Betts 8-yard run (Betts run failed)	Iowa 26–21
4	8:34	Mich	Shawn Thompson 13-yard pass from Navarre (Walker pass from Navarre)	Mich 29–26
4	3:57	Mich	Hayden Epstein 51-yard field goal	Mich 32–26

=== at Wisconsin ===
Iowa at Wisconsin

Team	1	2	3	4	Total
Hawkeyes	0	14	14	0	28
• Badgers	10	17	7	0	34

- Date: November 3
- Location: Camp Randall Stadium, Madison, WI
- Game start: 11:10 AM CDT
- Elapsed time: 3:20
- Game attendance: 79,421
- Referee: Bill LeMonnier
- Source: Box Score

=== Northwestern ===
Iowa at Northwestern

Team	1	2	3	4	Total
• Hawkeyes	21	10	28	0	59
Wildcats	7	0	2	7	16

- Date: November 10
- Location: Ryan Field, Evanston, IL
- Game start: 11:00 AM CST
- Game attendance: 36,458
- Source: Box Score and Game Recap

Scoring summary
1	7:44	Iowa	Jeremy Allen 4-yard run (Kaeding kick)	Iowa 7–0
1	3:08	Iowa	Ladell Betts 4-yard run (Kaeding kick)	Iowa 14–0
1	1:12	Iowa	Jeremy Allen 4-yard run (Kaeding kick)	Iowa 21–0
1	0:08	NW	Sam Simmons 29-yard pass from Zak Kustok (Wasielewski kick)	Iowa 21–7
2	6:58	Iowa	Aaron Greving 1-yard run (Kaeding kick)	Iowa 28–7
2	0:02	Iowa	Nate Kaeding 18-yard field goal	Iowa 31–7
3	13:51	Iowa	Ladell Betts 9-yard run (Kaeding kick)	Iowa 38–7
3	11:32	Iowa	Jeremy Allen 45-yard pass from Kyle McCann (Kaeding kick)	Iowa 45–7
3	8:58	Iowa	Erik Jensen 4-yard pass from Kyle McCann (Kaeding kick)	Iowa 52–7
3	3:12	NW	Safety	Iowa 52–9
3	0:09	Iowa	Siaka Massaquoi 1-yard run (Kaeding kick)	Iowa 59–9
4	2:45	NW	Trai Essex 2-yard pass from Tony Stauss (Wasielewski kick)	Iowa 59–16

=== Minnesota ===
Minnesota at Iowa
Battle for Floyd of Rosedale

Team	1	2	3	4	Total
Golden Gophers	0	3	7	14	24
• Hawkeyes	21	7	14	0	42

- Date: November 17
- Location: Kinnick Stadium, Iowa City, IA
- Game attendance: 65,491

Scoring summary
1	10:25	IOWA	Kyle McCann 5-yard run (Kaeding kick)	Iowa 7–0
1	5:27	IOWA	Jeremy Allen 1-yard pass from Kyle McCann (Kaeding kick)	Iowa 14–0
1	0:14	IOWA	Jeremy Allen 1-yard run (Kaeding kick)	Iowa 21–0
2	9:05	Minn	Dan Nystrom 31-yard field goal	Iowa 21–3
2	4:13	IOWA	Ladell Betts 5-yard run (Kaeding kick)	Iowa 28–3
3	11:24	Minn	Ben Utecht 22-yard pass from Asad Abdul-Khaliq (Nystrom kick)	Iowa 28–10
3	7:23	IOWA	Dallas Clark 15-yard pass from Kyle McCann (Kaeding kick)	Iowa 35–10
3	2:54	IOWA	Khalil Hill 4-yard pass from Kyle McCann (Kaeding kick)	Iowa 42–10
4	14:12	Minn	Ron Johnson 10-yard pass from Asad Abdul-Khaliq (two-point conversion failed)	Iowa 42–16
4	6:20	Minn	Ron Johnson 10-yard pass from Asad Abdul-Khaliq (Demetrus Johnson reception for two-point conversion)	Iowa 42–24

The Hawkeyes closed out their home schedule at 5–1 by blasting Minnesota. Iowa led 21–0 after the first quarter, 28–3 at half, and 42–10 after three quarters before cruising to the 18 point win. Kyle McCann threw 3 TD passes and ran for a TD.

After losing three straight in the series, this was the first of five consecutive wins for the Hawks over the Gophers.

=== at Iowa State ===
Iowa at Iowa State
Battle for the Cy-Hawk Trophy

Team	1	2	3	4	Total
Hawkeyes	0	0	14	0	14
• Cyclones	7	7	0	3	17

- Date: November 24
- Location: Jack Trice Stadium, Ames, IA
- Game start: 11:39am CST
- Elapsed time: 2:50
- Game attendance: 51,042
- Game weather: 57 °F (14 °C), Partly cloudy, Wind S 10–20 mph (16–32 km/h)
- Referee: Bill LeMonnier
- Television network: FSN

Scoring summary
1	7:09	ISU	Lane Danielsen 2-yard pass from Seneca Wallace (Tony Yelk kick)	ISU 7–0
2	0:57	ISU	Ennis Haywood 7-yard run (Tony Yelk kick)	ISU 14–0
3	9:06	IOWA	Ladell Betts 14-yard pass from Kyle McCann (Nate Kaeding kick)	ISU 14–7
3	5:48	IOWA	Ladell Betts 42-yard run (Nate Kaeding kick)	Tied 14–14
4	14:52	ISU	Tony Yelk 32-yard field goal	ISU 17–14

The annual battle for the Cy-Hawk Trophy was scheduled originally for September 15, but due to the September 11 attacks, it was postponed or canceled like all sporting events planned for that weekend. The game was rescheduled for November 24, which turned out to be a natural fit since many other major rivalries were played that weekend.

The Cyclones scored a touchdown in each of the first two quarters to head into halftime with a 14–0 lead. Iowa finally responded in the third quarter with two touchdowns from Ladell Betts, who also rushed for 150 yards on the day.

The final scoring play of the game came early in the fourth quarter, with Tony Yelk kicking a 32-yard field goal to put the Cyclones up 17–14. An interception by Adam Runk with 1:37 remaining sealed the game for the Cyclones.

=== vs. Texas Tech (Alamo Bowl) ===
Iowa vs. Texas Tech
Alamo Bowl

Team	1	2	3	4	Total
• Hawkeyes	3	7	3	6	19
Red Raiders	0	3	7	6	16

- Date: December 29
- Location: Alamodome, San Antonio, TX
- Game start: 2:37 p.m. CST
- Elapsed time: 3:33
- Game attendance: 65,232
- Game weather: Indoors
- Referee: Frank White
- TV announcers (ESPN): Ron Franklin, Mike Gottfried, and Adrian Karsten
- Sources: Box score

Scoring summary
Q1	5:45	IOWA	Nate Kaeding 36-yard field goal	Iowa 3–0
Q2	3:19	IOWA	Aaron Greving 1-yard run (Kaeding kick)	Iowa 10–0
Q2	0:00	TTU	Greathouse 50-yard field goal	Iowa 10–3
Q3	11:36	TTU	Wes Welker 20-yard pass from Kliff Kingsbury (Treece kick)	Tied 10–10
Q3	5:12	IOWA	Kaeding 31-yard field goal	Iowa 13–10
Q4	14:56	IOWA	Kaeding 46-yard field goal	Iowa 16–10
Q4	8:29	TTU	Treece 23-yard field goal	Iowa 16–13
Q4	2:05	TTU	Treece 37-yard field goal	Tied 16–16
Q4	0:44	IOWA	Kaeding 47-yard field goal	Iowa 19–16

Backup RB Aaron Greving ran for 115 yards and a touchdown and Nate Kaeding kicked four field goals, including the game-winner from 47 yards with 44 seconds remaining. The Hawkeyes earned their first bowl win under Kirk Ferentz and first since shutting out Texas Tech in the 1996 Alamo Bowl. The victory served as a springboard for the memorable 2002 season.

== Roster ==
The following is the roster from Iowa's 2001 season.

Quarterback: 4 Kyle McCann – senior; 5 David Raih – sophomore; 7 Brad Banks – junior; 14 Dan Katt – freshman; 16 Matt Bohnet – freshman; Running back: 2 Fred Russell – sophomore; 15 Robbie Crockett – senior; 23 Marcus Schnoor – freshman; 25 Kevin Sherlock – freshman; 29 Jermelle Lewis – freshman; 32 Siaka Massaquoi – junior; 34 Aaron Greving – sophomore; 36 Scott Rathke – senior; 40 Edgar Cervantes – sophomore; 43 Aaron Mickens – freshman; 45 Jonathan Babineaux – sophomore; 46 Ladell Betts – senior; 47 Jeremy Allen – senior; Wide receiver: 1 Tim Dodge – senior; 3 Kahlil Hill – senior; 6 Chris Oliver – senior; 8 C.J. Jones – junior; 11 Joseph Walker – freshman; 13 Ramon Ochoa – sophomore; 17 Ryan Donahue – freshman; 20 Mike Swim – freshman; 22 Dan Williams – junior; 27 Jordan Lickteig – freshman; 83 Kahari Stewart – freshman; 84 Matt Melloy – freshman; 85 Darius Butler – freshman; 86 Warren Holloway – freshman; Tight end: 22 Christopher Burhans – freshman; 35 Erik Jensen – sophomore; 44 Dallas Clark – junior; 80 John Morscheise – junior; 81 Tony Jackson – freshman; 82 Ben Gates – freshman; 87 C.J. Barkema – freshman; 89 Andy Thorn – freshman; Offensive line: 53 Will Lack – junior; 55 Adam Densmore – sophomore; 57 Brian Meidlinger – sophomore; 58 Blake Larsen – freshman; 59 Ben Cronin – freshman; 61 Brian Ferentz – freshman; 64 Pete Traynor – junior; 65 Ben Sobieski – senior; 66 Kody Asmus – freshman; 66 Erik Chinander – junior; 68 Jacob Bowers – freshman; 69 Peter McMahon – freshman; 70 Andy Lightfoot – junior; 71 Eric Rothwell – sophomore; 72 Bruce Nelson – junior; 73 David Porter – senior; 74 Alonzo Cunningham – senior; 75 Kory Borchers – sophomore; 76 Jason Hoveland – junior; 77 Sam Aiello – sophomore; 78 Robert Gallery – sophomore; 56 Eric Steinbach – junior	Defensive line: 28 Cody O'Hare – senior; 48 Howard Hodges – sophomore; 54 Aaron Kampman – senior; 58 Scott Webb – junior; 59 John Mickelson – freshman; 60 Tyler Luebke – sophomore; 67 Joseph Uselman – senior; 69 Marshall Freeman – freshman; 74 Carl Freeman – freshman; 78 Orinpheo Payne – sophomore; 79 Kelvin Bell – freshman; 90 Jared Clauss – sophomore; 91 Jerry Montgomery – senior; 92 Derrick Pickens – senior; 93 Jory Helms – sophomore; 94 Colin Cole – junior; 96 John Traynor – sophomore; 97 Fabian Dodd – freshman; 98 Derreck Robinson – freshman; 99 Lee Gray – freshman; Linebacker: 30 Roger Meyer – senior; 31 Matt Roth – freshman; 38 Matt Neubauer – freshman; 39 Mike Dolezal – senior; 42 Grant Steen – sophomore; 50 George Lewis – sophomore; 51 Fred Barr – junior; 52 Jacob Gancarczyk – freshman; 52 Abdul Hodge – freshman; 53 Kevin Worthy – sophomore; 57 Tom Revak – freshman; 18 Chad Greenway – freshman; Defensive back: 4 Scott Boleyn – junior; 5 D. J. Johnson – junior; 10 Shane Hall – senior; 11 Ed Hinkle – freshman; 12 Marqueas McLaurin – junior; 14 Adolphus Shelton – freshman; 17 Aramis Haralson – freshman; 19 Benny Sapp – sophomore; 20 Chris Smith – sophomore; 21 Matt Stockdale – senior; 25 Derek Pagel – junior; 26 Antwan Allen – freshman; 27 Jamire Roberts – junior; 33 Bob Sanders – sophomore; 36 Chigozie Ejiasi – freshman; 37 Sean Considine – freshman; 49 Mike Follett – freshman	Place Kicker: 8 Nate Campbell – junior; 95 Nate Kaeding – sophomore; Punter: 16 Clint Hinderaker – junior; 28 David Bradley – freshman; 91 John Gallery – freshman
Sources: SI.com 2001 football roster

== Team players in the 2002 NFL draft ==
Player	Position	Round	Pick	NFL club
Ladell Betts	Running back	2	56	Washington Redskins
Aaron Kampman	Defensive end	5	156	Green Bay Packers
Kahlil Hill	Wide receiver	6	184	Atlanta Falcons
