= 2002 Iowa Hawkeyes football team =

American college football season

2002 Iowa Hawkeyes football

Big Ten co-champion

Orange Bowl, L 17–38 vs. USC
- Conference: Big Ten Conference

Ranking
- Coaches: No. 8
- AP: No. 8
- Record: 11–2 (8–0 Big Ten)
- Head coach: Kirk Ferentz (4th season)
- Offensive coordinator: Ken O'Keefe (4th season)
- Offensive scheme: Pro-style
- Defensive coordinator: Norm Parker (4th season)
- Base defense: 4–3
- MVP: 12 players
- Captains: Brad Banks; Fred Barr; Colin Cole; Nate Kaeding; Bruce Nelson
- Home stadium: Kinnick Stadium

2002 Big Ten Conference football standings
	Conf.			Overall
Team	W		L	W		L
No. 1 Ohio State $#+	8	–	0	14	–	0
No. 8 Iowa %+	8	–	0	11	–	2
No. 9 Michigan	6	–	2	10	–	3
No. 16 Penn State	5	–	3	9	–	4
Purdue	4	–	4	7	–	6
Illinois	4	–	4	5	–	7
Minnesota	3	–	5	8	–	5
Wisconsin	2	–	6	8	–	6
Michigan State	2	–	6	4	–	8
Northwestern	1	–	7	3	–	9
Indiana	1	–	7	3	–	9
# – BCS National Champion; $ – BCS representative as conference champion; % – BCS at-large representative; + – Conference co-champions; Rankings from AP Poll

The 2002 Iowa Hawkeyes football team was an American football team that represented the University of Iowa as a member of the Big Ten Conference during the 2002 NCAA Division I-A football season. In their fourth season under head coach Kirk Ferentz, the Hawkeyes compiled an 11–2 record (8–0 in conference games), tied for the Big Ten championship, and outscored opponents by a total of 484 to 256. In games against ranked opponents, they defeated No. 12 Penn State and No. 8 Michigan, and lost to No. 5 USC in the 2003 Orange Bowl. The Hawkeyes were ranked No. 8 in the final AP and Coaches polls.

Quarterback Brad Banks tallied 2,573 passing yards and 26 passing touchdowns and won the Associated Press College Football Player of the Year Award, the Davey O'Brien Award, and the Chicago Tribune Silver Football. Banks also finished second in close voting for the Heisman Trophy. Other national awards went to Kirk Ferentz (national coach of the year), kicker Nate Kaeding (Lou Groza Award), and tight end Dallas Clark (John Mackey Award, consensus All-American).

The Hawkeyes played their home games at Kinnick Stadium in Iowa City, Iowa.

== Schedule ==
Date	Time	Opponent	Rank	Site	TV	Result	Attendance	Source
August 31	11:00 am	Akron*		Kinnick Stadium; Iowa City, IA	ESPN Plus	W 57–21	51,495	
September 7	11:00 am	at Miami (OH)*		Yager Stadium; Oxford, OH	ESPN Plus	W 29–24	25,934	
September 14	5:00 pm	Iowa State*		Kinnick Stadium; Iowa City, IA (rivalry)	ESPN2	L 31–36	70,397	
September 21	2:30 pm	Utah State*		Kinnick Stadium; Iowa City, IA	ESPN Plus	W 48–7	54,211	
September 28	11:00 am	at No. 12 Penn State		Beaver Stadium; University Park, PA	ESPN	W 42–35 ^{OT}	108,247	
October 5	11:00 am	Purdue^{†}	No. 24	Kinnick Stadium; Iowa City, IA	ESPN	W 31–28	68,249	
October 12	11:00 am	Michigan State	No. 17	Kinnick Stadium; Iowa City, IA	ESPN2	W 44–16	70,397	
October 19	11:00 am	at Indiana	No. 15	Memorial Stadium; Bloomington, IN	ESPN Plus	W 24–8	33,458	
October 26	11:00 am	at No. 8 Michigan	No. 13	Michigan Stadium; Ann Arbor, MI	ESPN	W 34–9	111,496	
November 2	11:00 am	Wisconsin	No. 9	Kinnick Stadium; Iowa City, IA (rivalry)	ESPN	W 20–3	70,397	
November 9	11:00 am	Northwestern	No. 6	Kinnick Stadium; Iowa City, IA	ESPN2	W 62–10	68,728	
November 16	11:00 am	at Minnesota	No. 6	Hubert H. Humphrey Metrodome; Minneapolis, MN (rivalry)	ESPN	W 45–21	65,184	
January 2	7:00 pm	vs. No. 5 USC*	No. 3	Pro Player Stadium; Miami Gardens, FL (Orange Bowl)	ABC	L 17–38	75,971	
*Non-conference game; ^{†}Homecoming; Rankings from AP Poll released prior to the game; All times are in Central time

== Rankings ==
Ranking movements Legend: ██ Increase in ranking ██ Decrease in ranking — = Not ranked RV = Received votes
	Week																	
Poll	Pre	1	2	3	4	5	6	7	8	9	10	11	12	13	14	15	16	Final
AP	—	—	—	—	—	—	24	17	15	13	9	6	6	5	4	3	3	8
Coaches	RV	RV	RV	RV	—	RV	RV	20	16	14	10	6	5	4	3	3	3	8
BCS	Not released									13	10	8	8	7	5	5	5	Not released

== Preseason ==
Coming off a 7–5 season that included an Alamo Bowl victory over Texas Tech, things were looking up for the Iowa Hawkeyes. However, the Hawkeyes had to replace six offensive starters and four defensive starters. Quarterback Brad Banks and running back Fred Russell looked to take a much bigger role in the offense. Russell would ultimately secure the starting spot as junior Aaron Greving decided to quit the team. Tight end Dallas Clark would also play a big role in the passing game.

On defense, the Hawkeyes lost all-conference defensive tackle Aaron Kampman, but had three players – Fred Barr, Benny Sapp, and Bob Sanders – on the Nagurski watch list. However, on August 5, 2002 Benny Sapp was arrested for disorderly conduct, resisting arrest and public intoxication leading to his being kicked off the team before the season started and his eventual transfer to the University of Northern Iowa and leaving the Hawkeyes very thin at cornerback. In total, Iowa returned six defensive starters as opposed to only five offensive starters. The Hawkeyes also returned punter David Bradley and kicker Nate Kaeding.

For lack of experience on offense, the Hawkeyes were unranked in both polls to start the season. They were also picked by Sports Illustrated to have a season similar to the year before, saying that another trip to the Alamo Bowl "should be viewed as a success."

== Game summaries ==
=== Akron ===
Akron (0-0) at Iowa (0-0)

Team	1	2	3	4	Total
Zips	0	14	7	0	21
• Hawkeyes	37	14	3	3	57

- Date: August 31, 2002
- Location: Kinnick Stadium, Iowa City, Iowa
- Game start: 11:10 AM CDT
- Elapsed time: 3:10
- Game attendance: 51,495
- Game weather: 69 °F (21 °C), Partly cloudy, Wind E 7 mph (11 km/h)
- Referee: D. Capron
- TV announcers (ESPN Plus): Larry Morgan and Marv Cook
- Source: Box Score

Scoring summary
1	13:01	Iowa	Fred Russell 44-yard run (Nate Kaeding kick)	Iowa 7-0
1	10:26	Iowa	Kevin Worthy 75-yard fumble return (Nate Kaeding kick)	Iowa 14-0
1	9:29	Iowa	Safety, ball through end zone	Iowa 16-0
1	8:10	Iowa	Fred Russell 35-yard run (Nate Kaeding kick)	Iowa 23-0
1	5:02	Iowa	C.J. Jones 56-yard pass from Brad Banks (Nate Kaeding kick)	Iowa 30-0
1	0:10	Iowa	Mo Brown 36-yard pass from Brad Banks (Nate Kaeding kick)	Iowa 37-0
2	11:54	Akron	Matthew Cherry 8-yard pass from Charlie Frye (Billy Sullivan kick)	Iowa 37-7
2	9:39	Iowa	Jermelle Lewis 1-yard run (Nate Kaeding kick)	Iowa 44-7
2	3:06	Iowa	Jermelle Lewis 1-yard run (Nate Kaeding kick)	Iowa 51-7
2	0:00	Akron	Jamie Goodwin 31-yard pass from Charlie Frye (Billy Sullivan kick)	Iowa 51-14
3	12:30	Iowa	Nate Kaeding 23-yard field goal	Iowa 54-14
3	7:35	Akron	Brandon Payne 1-yard run (Billy Sullivan kick)	Iowa 54-21
4	13:36	Iowa	Nate Kaeding 23-yard field goal	Iowa 57–21

Iowa’s offense proved unstoppable as Fred Russell and Jermelle Lewis combined for 293 of the Hawkeyes' 376 rushing yards. Quarterback Brad Banks was steady in his debut, completing five of his eight passes, two for touchdowns. Wide receiver Mo Brown was on the receiving end of both of Banks' touchdowns. The defense was suspect at times (nearly 300 passing yards by Akron), but linebacker Kevin Worthy picked up the slack with a 72-yard fumble return for a touchdown. Iowa's 37 points in the first quarter was a school record for points in a single quarter.

Statistics	AKRON	IOWA
First downs	23	26
Total yards	363	593
Rushing yards	67	376
Passing yards	296	217
Turnovers	3	1
Time of possession	31:39	28:21

=== At Miami (OH) ===
Iowa (1-0) at Miami (OH) (1-0)

Team	1	2	3	4	Total
• Hawkeyes	7	6	9	7	29
RedHawks	0	10	7	7	24

- Date: September 7, 2002
- Location: Yager Stadium,
  Oxford, Ohio
- Game start: 12:10 PM EDT
- Elapsed time: 3:14
- Game attendance: 25,934
- Game weather: 91 °F (33 °C), Sunny and hot, Wind SE 5 mph (8.0 km/h)
- Referee: Dennis Lipski
- Television network: ESPN Plus
- Source: Box Score

Scoring summary
1	5:50	Iowa	Fred Russell 4-yard run (Nate Kaeding kick)	Iowa 7–0
2	14:44	Miami	Jared Parseghian 36-yard field goal	Iowa 7–3
2	9:55	Iowa	Nate Kaeding 37-yard field goal	Iowa 10–3
2	5:44	Miami	Michael Larkin 26-yard pass from Ben Roethlisberger (Jared Parseghian kick)	Tied 10–10
2	1:02	Iowa	Nate Kaeding 27-yard field goal	Iowa 13–10
3	6:36	Iowa	Nate Kaeding 49-yard field goal	Iowa 16–10
3	3:01	Miami	Mike Iriti fumble recovered by Calvin Murray in end zone (Jared Parseghian kick)	Miami 17–16
3	1:30	Iowa	Jermelle Lewis 12-yard run (Two-point attempt failed)	Iowa 22–17
4	11:44	Iowa	C.J. Jones 48-yard pass from Brad Banks (Nate Kaeding kick)	Iowa 29–17
4	4:54	Miami	Jason Brand 24-yard pass from Ben Roethlisberger (Jared Parseghian kick)	Iowa 29–24

Facing a Ben Roethlisberger-led Miami squad, the Hawkeyes struggled to a five-point victory. Fred Russell ran for over 100 yards for the second straight week and Mo Brown caught five passes for 115 yards and one touchdown. Banks went head-to-head with Roethlisberger, throwing for 256 yards. Roethlisberger passed the ball 51 times, and completed 33 of them for 343 yards but had two interceptions. Capitalizing on several Iowa mistakes, the RedHawks were in the game late into the fourth quarter but could not pull off the upset at home.

Statistics	IOWA	M-OH
First downs	22	25
Total yards	444	357
Rushing yards	188	14
Passing yards	256	343
Turnovers	1	1
Time of possession	33:25	26:35

=== Iowa State ===
Iowa State (2-1) at Iowa (2-0)
Cy-Hawk Game

Team	1	2	3	4	Total
• Cyclones	7	0	23	6	36
Hawkeyes	7	17	0	7	31

- Date: September 14, 2002
- Location: Kinnick Stadium, Iowa City, Iowa
- Game start: 5:05 PM CDT
- Elapsed time: 3:20
- Game attendance: 70,397
- Game weather: 76 °F (24 °C), Cloudy, Wind SW 6 mph (9.7 km/h)
- Referee: H. Dowden
- TV announcers (ESPN2): Dave Barnett (play-by-play), Bill Curry (analyst), Mike Golic (analyst), and Michele Tafoya (sidelines)
- Source: Box Score

Scoring summary
1	14:00	Iowa	Fred Russell 46-yard run (Nate Kaeding kick)	Iowa 7–0
1	7:51	Iowa St	Hiawatha Rutland 6-yard run (Adam Benike kick)	Tied 7–7
2	10:34	Iowa	Nate Kaeding 40-yard field goal	Iowa 10–7
2	9:17	Iowa	Mo Brown 50-yard pass from Brad Banks (Nate Kaeding kick)	Iowa 17–7
2	2:47	Iowa	Jermelle Lewis 10-yard run (Nate Kaeding kick)	Iowa 24–7
3	10:58	Iowa St	Seneca Wallace 5-yard run (Adam Benike kick)	Iowa 24–14
3	7:24	Iowa St	Jamaul Montgomery 7-yard pass from Seneca Wallace (Adam Benike kick)	Iowa 24–21
3	4:31	Iowa St	Joe Woodley 1-yard run (Adam Benike kick)	ISU 28–24
3	4:16	Iowa St	Safety	ISU 30–24
4	5:19	Iowa St	Adam Benike 36-yard field goal	ISU 33–24
4	4:08	Iowa St	Adam Benike 38-yard field goal	ISU 36–24
4	1:23	Iowa	Mo Brown 20-yard pass from Brad Banks (Nate Kaeding kick)	ISU 36–31

Having not beaten their in-state rivals in the four previous seasons, the Hawkeyes quickly grabbed a 17-point halftime lead in the 50th meeting between the schools. But Iowa State's Seneca Wallace was not about to leave Iowa City with a loss. Coupled with two Banks fumbles in Iowa territory, a stellar performance by the senior quarterback led to 29 straight Iowa State points. Despite holding Iowa State to 85 yards rushing, Iowa's last touchdown was a little too late, and the Cyclones ran out the clock after Iowa failed an onside kick attempt.

Statistics	ISU	IOWA
First downs	22	21
Total yards	446	400
Rushing yards	85	222
Passing yards	361	178
Turnovers	1	3
Time of possession	32:06	27:54

=== Utah State ===
Utah State (1-2) at Iowa (2-1)

Team	1	2	3	4	Total
Aggies	0	7	0	0	7
• Hawkeyes	14	10	24	0	48

- Date: September 21, 2002
- Location: Kinnick Stadium, Iowa City, Iowa
- Game start: 2:40 PM CDT
- Elapsed time: 3:00
- Game attendance: 54,211
- Game weather: 72 °F (22 °C), Clear and sunny, Wind N 9 mph (14 km/h)
- Referee: J. Roggeman
- Television network: ESPN Plus
- Source: Box Score

Scoring summary
1	8:45	Iowa	C.J. Jones 12-yard pass from Brad Banks (Nate Kaeding kick)	Iowa 7–0
1	3:18	Iowa	Edgar Cervantes 1-yard run (Nate Kaeding kick)	Iowa 14–0
2	11:04	Iowa	Brad Banks 1-yard run (Nate Kaeding kick)	Iowa 21–0
2	6:12	Utah St	Roger Robinson 25-yard run (Dane Kidman kick)	Iowa 21–7
2	3:11	Iowa	Nate Kaeding 35-yard field goal	Iowa 24–7
3	10:42	Iowa	Jermelle Lewis 74-yard run (Nate Kaeding kick)	Iowa 31–7
3	9:33	Iowa	Aggies punt blocked, recovered by Mike Follett, advanced for a touchdown (Nate Kaeding kick)	Iowa 38–7
3	4:37	Iowa	Nate Kaeding 50-yard field goal	Iowa 41–7
3	3:34	Iowa	Jared Clauss fumble recovery in end zone	Iowa 48–7

For the second straight week, the Hawkeyes held a 24–7 advantage at halftime. But this time, the Hawks did all the scoring in the 3rd quarter to salt the game away. Iowa was without starting running back Fred Russell but Jermelle Lewis did an excellent job in replacement. The sophomore had 109 yards on only 9 rushes. The Hawkeyes also got scores off a blocked punt by Sean Considine recovered by Mike Follett and a fumble recovery by Jared Clauss. As a team, the Hawkeyes racked up exactly 300 yards rushing and 518 yards of total offense.

Statistics	USU	IOWA
First downs	15	25
Total yards	244	518
Rushing yards	21	300
Passing yards	223	218
Turnovers	1	0
Time of possession	24:08	35:52

=== At No. 12 Penn State ===
Iowa (3-1) at No. 12 Penn State (3-0)
Big Ten Opener

Team	1	2	3	4	OT	Total
• Hawkeyes	17	9	9	0	7	42
No. 12 Nittany Lions	0	7	6	22	0	35

- Date: September 28, 2002
- Location: Beaver Stadium, University Park, Pennsylvania
- Game start: 12:05 PM EDT
- Game attendance: 108,247
- TV announcers (ESPN): Mark Jones (Play-by-play), Bob Davie (Color commentator) & Holly Rowe (Sideline reporter)
- Source: Box Score

Scoring summary
1	9:34	Iowa	C.J. Jones 4-yard pass from Brad Banks (Nate Kaeding kick)	Iowa 7–0
1	4:51	Iowa	Nate Kaeding 47-yard field goal	Iowa 10–0
1	3:46	Iowa	Fred Russell 20-yard run (Nate Kaeding kick)	Iowa 17–0
2	6:04	Iowa	Ed Hinkel 22-yard pass from Brad Banks (PAT blocked)	Iowa 23–0
2	1:25	Penn St	B. Johnson 28-yard pass from Z. Mills (R. Gould kick)	Iowa 23–7
2	0:00	Iowa	Nate Kaeding 55-yard field goal	Iowa 26–7
3	10:32	Penn St	Larry Johnson 1-yard run (PAT blocked)	Iowa 26–13
3	10:32	Iowa	D.J. Johnson 99-yard blocked PAT return	Iowa 28–13
3	7:03	Iowa	Mo Brown 54-yard pass from Brad Banks (Nate Kaeding kick)	Iowa 35–13
4	7:13	Penn St	Larry Johnson 36-yard pass from Z. Mills (R. Gould kick)	Iowa 35–20
4	3:51	Penn St	T. Johnson 44-yard pass from Z. Mills (C. Canter run for two-point conversion)	Iowa 35–28
4	1:20	Penn St	B. Johnson 8-yard pass from Z. Mills (R. Gould kick)	Tied 35–35
OT		Iowa	C.J. Jones 6-yard pass from Brad Banks (Nate Kaeding kick)	Iowa 42–35

Iowa opened up Big Ten play against the #12 team in the country, the Penn State Nittany Lions. On the heels of three quick touchdowns and one field goal, the Hawkeyes opened up the game with an unexpected 23–0 lead. When Penn State finally got on the scoreboard, Iowa quickly answered back with a Nate Kaeding 55-yard field goal as time expired in the first half. Holding a 35–13 lead going into the 4th quarter, things were looking ripe for a Hawkeye upset. But Penn State quarterback Zack Mills had the game of his career and threw three touchdown passes in the final 7:13 to tie the game at 35. Mills had a total of 399 passing yards in the game. However, Penn State was not able to answer an Iowa touchdown in the first overtime and, for the first time since 1996, Iowa had beaten a ranked opponent on the road. The win vaulted the Hawkeyes into the AP Top 25 for the first time since 1997.

Statistics	IOWA	PSU
First downs	20	25
Total yards	470	453
Rushing yards	209	54
Passing yards	261	399
Turnovers	3	3
Time of possession	34:14	25:46

=== Purdue ===
Purdue (3-2) at No. 24 Iowa (4-1)
Homecoming

Team	1	2	3	4	Total
Boilermakers	7	7	0	14	28
• No. 24 Hawkeyes	3	7	14	7	31

- Date: October 5, 2002
- Location: Kinnick Stadium, Iowa City, Iowa
- Game start: 11:00 AM CDT
- Game attendance: 68,249
- Game weather: Sunny
- Referee: S. Newman
- TV announcers (ESPN): Mark Jones (Play-by-play), Bob Davie (Color commentator) & Holly Rowe (Sideline reporter)
- Source: Box Score

Scoring summary
1	3:49	Iowa	Nate Kaeding 51-yard field goal	Iowa 3–0
1	1:16	Purdue	John Standeford 61-yard pass from Kyle Orton (Bernie Lacevic kick)	Purdue 7–3
2	11:15	Purdue	Jerod Void 1-yard run (Bernie Lacevic kick)	Purdue 14–3
2	1:20	Iowa	Antwan Allen 85-yard blocked field goal return (Nate Kaeding kick)	Purdue 14–10
3	12:48	Iowa	Jermire Roberts recovers blocked punt in end zone (Nate Kaeding kick)	Iowa 17–14
3	2:37	Iowa	Dallas Clark 95-yard pass from Brad Banks (Nate Kaeding kick)	Iowa 24–14
4	10:23	Purdue	Brandon Kirsch 16-yard run (Bernie Lacevic kick)	Iowa 24–21
4	5:45	Purdue	Jon Goldsberry 2-yard run (Bernie Lacevic kick)	Purdue 28–24
4	1:07	Iowa	Dallas Clark 7-yard pass from Brad Banks (Nate Kaeding kick)	Iowa 31–28

In a game that was full of big plays, Iowa did just enough to win on Homecoming weekend. Iowa scored three times on special teams, once on a blocked field goal, once on a blocked punt and once on a 51-yard Nate Kaeding field goal. But even a 95-yard touchdown pass from Brad Banks to Dallas Clark wasn't enough to keep the Boilermakers from making a comeback. Scoring on two rushing touchdowns in the 4th quarter, Purdue quickly turned a 10-point deficit into a four-point lead. And after Banks was sacked on 4th down with only 2:44 remaining, it seemed as if Purdue would escape with the victory. But the Boilermakers could do nothing with their three downs and had to punt the ball away. Banks wasted no time, running for a 44-yard gain to the Purdue 43 on the first play of the drive. Later, on 4th down from the Purdue seven-yard line, Banks connected with Clark once again, this time for the game-winning touchdown. Purdue had one last chance, but a late interception by Adolphus Shelton secured the Iowa victory.

Statistics	PUR	IOWA
First downs	30	14
Total yards	507	384
Rushing yards	97	158
Passing yards	410	226
Turnovers	2	1
Time of possession	27:09	32:51

=== Michigan State ===
Michigan State (3-2) at No. 17 Iowa (5-1)

Team	1	2	3	4	Total
Spartans	7	0	0	9	16
• No. 17 Hawkeyes	17	10	17	0	44

- Date: October 12, 2002
- Location: Kinnick Stadium, Iowa City, Iowa
- Game start: 11:05 AM CDT
- Elapsed time: 3:25
- Game attendance: 69,021
- Referee: B. LeMonnier
- TV announcers (ESPN2): Mark Jones (Play-by-play), Bob Davie (Color commentator) & Holly Rowe (Sideline reporter)
- Source: Box Score

Scoring summary
1	7:38	Mich St	Dawan Moss 2-yard run (D. Rayner kick)	Mich St 7-0
1	7:21	Iowa	Jermelle Lewis 94-yard kickoff return (Nate Kaeding kick)	Tied 7-7
1	2:35	Iowa	Nate Kaeding 36-yard field goal	Iowa 10-7
1	0:25	Iowa	Derek Pagel 62-yard interception return (Nate Kaeding kick)	Iowa 17-7
2	6:22	Iowa	C.J. Jones 62-yard pass from Brad Banks (Nate Kaeding kick)	Iowa 24-7
2	0:25	Iowa	Nate Kaeding 43-yard field goal	Iowa 27-7
3	11:54	Iowa	Fred Russell 9-yard run (Nate Kaeding kick)	Iowa 34-7
3	8:50	Iowa	Nate Kaeding 28-yard field goal	Iowa 37-7
3	1:32	Iowa	C.J. Jones 25-yard pass from Brad Banks (Nate Kaeding kick)	Iowa 44-7
4	7:59	Mich St	B. Lovett 20-yard pass from Jeff Smoker (D. Rayner kick)	Iowa 44-14
4	2:11	Mich St	Safety, D. Bradley ran out of end zone	Iowa 44–16

Iowa's defense was strong against Michigan State, as the Hawkeyes held the Spartans to just 249 yards of total offense. No one really stood out on offense, but the Hawkeyes once again got scores from the defense and the special teams. Immediately following a Spartan touchdown, Iowa's Jermelle Lewis returned the kick 94 yards for the touchdown. Later in the 1st quarter, Derek Pagel took an interception 62 yards for the touchdown. C.J. Jones scored twice on passes from Brad Banks as Iowa scored 44 consecutive points spanning the first three quarters. Iowa also held Michigan State's Charles Rogers from scoring a touchdown, ending Rogers' consecutive game streak with a touchdown reception at 14.

Statistics	MSU	IOWA
First downs	21	15
Total yards	249	284
Rushing yards	55	127
Passing yards	194	157
Turnovers	5	1
Time of possession	31:32	28:28

=== At Indiana ===
No. 15 Iowa (6-1) at Indiana (3-3)

Team	1	2	3	4	Total
• No. 15 Hawkeyes	17	0	0	7	24
Hoosiers	0	0	3	5	8

- Date: October 19, 2002
- Location: Memorial Stadium, Bloomington, Indiana
- Game attendance: 33,458
- Referee: Dave Witvoet
- Television network: ESPN Plus
- Source: Box Score

Scoring summary
1	9:15	Iowa	Fred Russell 3-yard run (Nate Kaeding kick)	Iowa 7–0
1	5:51	Iowa	Nate Kaeding 43-yard field goal	Iowa 10–0
1	1:13	Iowa	Fred Russell 2-yard run (Nate Kaeding kick)	Iowa 17–0
3	8:39	Indiana	Bryan Robertson 45-yard field goal	Iowa 17–3
4	13:43	Indiana	Bryan Robertson 23-yard field goal	Iowa 17–6
4	11:49	Iowa	Mo Brown 65-yard pass from Brad Banks (Nate Kaeding kick)	Iowa 24–6
4	2:53	Indiana	Safety	Iowa 24–8

Running back Fred Russell was the star on offense, running for 110 yards and two touchdowns. But aside from Grant Steen's three interceptions and the eight points allowed, the defense was not up to par. The Hawkeyes allowed 480 yards of total offense, including 334 yards passing by Indiana's Gibran Hamdan. The Hawkeyes also made several mental errors by fumbling the ball twice while Brad Banks threw a rare interception. The game could have been much closer had Steen not intercepted all three passes deep in Iowa territory. The three interceptions is also an Iowa single-game record.

Statistics	IOWA	IU
First downs	17	26
Total yards	358	481
Rushing yards	168	146
Passing yards	190	335
Turnovers	3	3
Time of possession	24:51	35:09

=== At No. 8 Michigan ===
No. 13 Iowa (7-1) at No. 8 Michigan (6-1)

Team	1	2	3	4	Total
• No. 13 Hawkeyes	10	0	14	10	34
No. 8 Wolverines	0	6	3	0	9

- Date: October 26, 2002
- Location: Michigan Stadium, Ann Arbor, Michigan
- Game start: 12:10 PM EDT
- Elapsed time: 3:30
- Game attendance: 111,496
- Referee: J. Lapetina
- TV announcers (ESPN): Mark Jones (Play-by-play), Bob Davie (Color commentator) & Holly Rowe (Sideline reporter)
- Source: Box Score

Scoring summary
1	10:37	Iowa	C.J. Jones 39-yard pass from Brad Banks (Nate Kaeding kick)	Iowa 7–0
1	3:12	Iowa	Nate Kaeding 51-yard field goal	Iowa 10–0
2	1:13	Mich	Chris Perry 1-yard run (PAT failed)	Iowa 10–6
3	12:31	Mich	A Finley 40-yard field goal	Iowa 10–9
3	8:57	Iowa	C.J. Jones 3-yard pass from Brad Banks (Nate Kaeding kick)	Iowa 17–9
3	2:58	Iowa	Jermelle Lewis 5-yard run (Nate Kaeding kick)	Iowa 24–9
4	14:47	Iowa	Jermelle Lewis 23-yard pass from Brad Banks (Nate Kaeding kick)	Iowa 31–9
4	2:49	Iowa	Nate Kaeding 27-yard field goal	Iowa 34–9

Behind a solid effort from running back Jermelle Lewis and wide receiver C. J. Jones, the Hawkeyes quickly jumped out to a 10–0 lead. And if it were not for a fumbled punt, the game wouldn't have gotten any closer. As it was, Michigan's Chris Perry scored moments later and Iowa took a 10–6 lead into halftime. After a Michigan field goal pushed the score to 10–9, Iowa took over. The Hawkeyes scored 24 unanswered points to finish the game as Lewis and Jones racked up two touchdowns each. Quarterback Brad Banks threw for 222 yards and three touchdowns as Iowa handed Michigan their worst home loss since 1967. The win propelled the Hawkeyes into the AP Top 10 for the first time since the 1991 season.

Statistics	IOWA	MICH
First downs	22	12
Total yards	399	171
Rushing yards	217	62
Passing yards	222	149
Turnovers	0	1
Time of possession	38:27	21:33

=== Wisconsin ===
Wisconsin (6-3) at No. 9 Iowa (8-1)

Team	1	2	3	4	Total
Badgers	0	3	0	0	3
• No. 9 Hawkeyes	0	10	10	0	20

- Date: November 2, 2002
- Location: Kinnick Stadium, Iowa City, Iowa
- Game start: 11:05 AM CST
- Elapsed time: 3:00
- Game attendance: 70,397
- Referee: S. Pamon
- Television network: ESPN
- Source: Box Score

Scoring summary
2	Iowa	Nate Kaeding 32-yard field goal	Iowa 3–0
2	Wisconsin	Mike Allen 26-yard field goal	Tied 3–3
2	Iowa	Mo Brown 21-yard pass from Brad Banks (Nate Kaeding kick)	Iowa 10–3
3	Iowa	Nate Kaeding 30-yard field goal	Iowa 13–3
3	Iowa	Dallas Clark 23-yard pass from Brad Banks (Nate Kaeding kick)	Iowa 20–3

Quarterback Brad Banks threw for a career-high 275 yards while the Hawkeye defense held the Badgers to just 78 yards rushing. In total, Wisconsin had 215 yards of offense. Iowa's Mo Brown and Dallas Clark finished with a combined 204 receiving yards and had both of Iowa's touchdowns. As a result of Iowa's powerful defense, Wisconsin lost two quarterbacks to injury, Brooks Bollinger and Jim Sorgi. Iowa's defense also held running back Anthony Davis to a career-low 34 yards on 16 rushes. After the victory, Iowa was 6–0 in the Big Ten for the first time in school history.

Statistics	WIS	IOWA
First downs	14	19
Total yards	215	405
Rushing yards	78	130
Passing yards	137	275
Turnovers	2	0
Time of possession	27:25	32:35

=== Northwestern ===
Northwestern (3-7) at No. 6 Hawkeyes (9-1)
Senior Day

Team	1	2	3	4	Total
Wildcats	7	3	0	0	10
• No. 6 Hawkeyes	14	21	21	6	62

- Date: November 9, 2002
- Location: Kinnick Stadium, Iowa City, Iowa
- Game start: 11:05 a.m. CST
- Elapsed time: 3:05
- Game attendance: 68,728
- Referee: D. Honig
- TV announcers (ESPN2): Pam Ward (Play-by-play), Chris Spielman (Color commentator) & Rob Stone (Sideline reporter)
- Source: Box Score

Scoring summary
1	12:22	Iowa	Jermelle Lewis 7-yard run (Nate Kaeding kick)	Iowa 7–0
1	10:45	Iowa	Mo Brown 40-yard pass from Brad Banks (Nate Kaeding kick)	Iowa 14–0
1	8:18	NW	A. Aikens 8-yard pass from Brett Basanez (D. Wasielewski kick)	Iowa 14–7
2	12:28	Iowa	Brad Banks 9-yard run (Nate Kaeding kick)	Iowa 21–7
2	10:19	Iowa	Mo Brown 65-yard pass from Brad Banks (Nate Kaeding kick)	Iowa 28–7
2	5:21	NW	D. Wasielewski 26-yard field goal	Iowa 28–10
2	2:18	Iowa	Brad Banks 19-yard run (Nate Kaeding kick)	Iowa 35–10
3	13:18	Iowa	Ed Hinkel 58-yard punt return (Nate Kaeding kick)	Iowa 42–10
3	9:36	Iowa	Dallas Clark 28-yard pass from Brad Banks (Nate Kaeding kick)	Iowa 49–10
3	6:43	Iowa	C.J. Jones 22-yard pass from Nathan Chandler (Nate Kaeding kick)	Iowa 56–10
4	12:49	Iowa	Marcus Schnoor 5-yard run (PAT blocked)	Iowa 62–10

On Senior Day, Brad Banks was a perfect 10-for-10 for 197 yards and three touchdowns. He also scored on two of Iowa's four rushing touchdowns. Iowa's receivers were busy as Mo Brown, Dallas Clark and C.J. Jones all had touchdowns. Freshman wideout Ed Hinkel even got in on the action, scoring on a 58-yard punt return. Running back Fred Russell returned from a hand injury, and ran for 100 yards in becoming Iowa's 10th player to have a 1,000-yard rushing season. Iowa's victory tied a school record for wins in a season at 10.

Statistics	NW	IOWA
First downs	20	24
Total yards	298	475
Rushing yards	99	245
Passing yards	199	230
Turnovers	3	1
Time of possession	27:47	32:13

=== At Minnesota ===
No. 6 Iowa (10-1) at Minnesota (7-3)
Floyd of Rosedale

Team	1	2	3	4	Total
• No. 6 Hawkeyes	14	14	7	10	45
Golden Gophers	7	7	7	0	21

- Date: November 16, 2002
- Location: Hubert H. Humphrey Metrodome, Minneapolis
- Game start: 11:05 AM CST
- Game attendance: 65,184
- Referee: Bill LeMonnier
- TV announcers (ESPN): Mark Jones (Play-by-play), Bob Davie (Color commentator) & Holly Rowe (Sideline reporter)
- Source: Box Score

Scoring summary
1	12:44	Iowa	Fred Russell 10-yard run (Nate Kaeding kick)	Iowa 7–0
1	1:46	Minn	A. Burns 11-yard pass from A. Abdul-Khaliq (D. Nystrom kick)	Tied 7–7
1	0:29	Iowa	Jermelle Lewis 6-yard run	Iowa 14–7
2	13:22	Iowa	Brad Banks 11-yard run (Nate Kaeding kick)	Iowa 21–7
2	7:48	Iowa	Mo Brown 31-yard pass from Brad Banks (Nate Kaeding kick)	Iowa 28–7
2	0:32	Minn	A. Abdul-Khaliq 1-yard run (D. Nystrom kick)	Iowa 28–14
3	11:12	Iowa	Clinton Solomon 6-yard pass from Brad Banks (Nate Kaeding kick)	Iowa 35–14
3	5:55	Minn	A. Abdul-Khaliq 1-yard run (D. Nystrom kick)	Iowa 35–21
4	14:57	Iowa	Nate Kaeding 21-yard field goal	Iowa 38–21
4	7:27	Iowa	Brad Banks 1-yard run	Iowa 45–21

Iowa's defense forced six Minnesota turnovers en route to a 45–21 victory. The Hawkeyes only had 100 yards passing, mainly because their running game couldn't be stopped. Fred Russell and Jermelle Lewis combined for 295 of Iowa's 365 rushing yards while Brad Banks threw for two touchdowns and ran for two touchdowns. Mo Brown caught his tenth touchdown pass of the season, which tied Quinn Early for touchdown receptions in a season. The win was Iowa's tenth straight Big Ten win, the longest such streak since a 13-game streak in the 1920s. The game was also played in front of the largest crowd to ever see a Minnesota Golden Gophers football game at the Metrodome.

Statistics	IOWA	MINN
First downs	27	19
Total yards	465	285
Rushing yards	365	80
Passing yards	100	205
Turnovers	0	6
Time of possession	34:55	25:05

=== vs. No. 5 USC (Orange Bowl) ===
No. 3 Iowa (11–1) vs. No. 5 Trojans (10–2)
Orange Bowl

Team	1	2	3	4	Total
No. 3 Hawkeyes	10	0	0	7	17
• No. 5 Trojans	7	3	14	14	38

- Date: January 2, 2003
- Location: Pro Player Stadium, Miami Gardens, Florida
- Game start: 9:00 PM EST
- Elapsed time: 3:46
- Game attendance: 75,971
- Referee: J.Childress
- TV announcers (ABC): Tim Brant (Play-by-play), Ed Cunningham (Color commentator) & Sam Ryan (Sideline reporter)
- Source: Box Score

Scoring summary
1	14:43	Iowa	C.J. Jones 100-yard kickoff return (Nate Kaeding kick)	Iowa 7-0
1	12:46	USC	Justin Fargas 4-yard run (Ryan Killeen kick)	Tied 7-7
1	6:26	Iowa	Nate Kaeding 35-yard field goal	Iowa 10-7
2	1:12	USC	Ryan Killeen 35-yard field goal	Tied 10-10
3	10:14	USC	Mike Williams 18-yard pass from Carson Palmer (Ryan Killeen kick)	USC 17-10
3	4:58	USC	Justin Fargas 50-yard run (Ryan Killeen kick)	USC 24-10
4	14:25	USC	Sultan McCullough 5-yard run (Ryan Killeen kick)	USC 31-10
4	2:36	USC	Byrd 6-yard run (Ryan Killeen kick)	USC 38-10
4	0:34	Iowa	Mo Brown 18-yard pass from Brad Banks (Nate Kaeding kick)	USC 38-17

On January 1, 2003, No. 3 Iowa lost to No. 5 USC, 38–17, in the 2003 Orange Bowl. Iowa's C.J. Jones took the opening kickoff 100-yards for a touchdown. The first half ended in a 10–10 tie, but USC scored 28 points in the seecond half. USC quarterback Carson Palmer threw for over 300 yards against the Big Ten's worst passing defense and led scoring drives of 79, 80, 99, 85 and 61 yards as the Trojans held a 16-minute advantage in time of possession. The USC defense was suffocating and Iowa's miscues were proof. The Hawkeyes had two turnovers, 13 penalties, and multiple missed opportunities.

Statistics	IOWA	USC
First downs	18	30
Total yards	323	550
Rushing yards	119	247
Passing yards	204	303
Turnovers	2	0
Time of possession	21:54	38:06

== Roster ==
2002 Iowa Hawkeyes football team roster
Players
Coaches
Offense

Pos.	#	Name	Class
QB	7	Brad Banks	Sr
QB	6	Matt Bohnet	Fr
QB	10	Nathan Chandler	Jr
QB	16	Jason Manson	Fr
QB	12	Cy Phillips	Fr
QB	5	David Raih	Jr
QB	4	Clinton Solomon	Fr
RB	40	Edgar Cervantes	Jr
RB	34	Aaron Greving	Jr
RB	29	Jermelle Lewis	So
RB	46	Mike Mangan	So
RB	43	Aaron Mickens	So
RB	2	Fred Russell	Jr
RB	23	Marcus Schnoor	Fr
RB	25	Kevin Sherlock	Fr
WR	9	Maurice Brown	Jr
WR	22	Calvin Davis	Fr
WR	11	Ed Hinkel	Fr
WR	86	Warren Holloway	So
WR	8	C. J. Jones	Sr
WR	12	Marqueas McLaurin	Sr
WR	84	Matt Melloy	Fr
WR	15	Miguel Merrick	Fr
WR	13	Ramon Ochoa	Jr
WR	83	David Vickers	Fr
TE	87	C.J. Barkema	Fr
TE	44	Dallas Clark	Jr
TE	82	Ben Gates	Fr
TE	81	Tony Jackson	So
TE	35	Erik Jensen	Jr
TE	80	John Morscheiser II	Sr
TE	89	Andy Thorn	So
OL	77	Sam Aiello	Jr
OL	66	Kody Asmus	So
OL	75	Kory Borchers	Jr
OL	68	Jacob Bowers	So
OL	66	Erik Chinander	Sr
OL	59	Ben Cronin	Fr
OL	55	Adam Densmore	Jr
OL	64	Chris Felder	Fr
OL	61	Brian Ferentz	Fr
OL	78	Robert Gallery	Jr
OL	76	Jason Hoveland	Sr
OL	53	Will Lack	Sr
OL	58	Blake Larsen	Fr
OL	70	Andy Lightfoot	Sr
OL	69	Pete McMahon	So
OL	72	Bruce Nelson	Sr
OL	73	David Porter	Sr
OL	71	Eric Rothwell	Jr
OL	65	Ben Sobieski	Sr
OL	56	Eric Steinbach	Sr
OL	64	Pete Traynor	Sr

Defense

Pos.	#	Name	Class
DL	45	Jonathan Babineaux	So
DL	92	Steve Burch	Fr
DL	90	Jared Clauss	Jr
DL	94	Colin Cole	Sr
DL	97	Fabian Dodd	Fr
DL	79	Marshall Freeman	So
DL	99	Lee Gray	Fr
DL	93	Jory Helms	Jr
DL	48	Howard Hodges	Jr
DL	60	Tyler Luebke	Jr
DL	88	Warren McDuffey	Fr
DL	59	John Mickelson	Sr
DL	78	O.J. Payne	Jr
DL	98	Derreck Robinson	So
DL	31	Matt Roth	So
DL	63	Larry Thomas	Fr
DL	96	John Traynor	Jr
DL	58	Scott Webb	Sr
LB	51	Fred Barr	Sr
LB	54	Mike Elgin	Fr
LB	49	Mike Follett	Fr
LB	55	Jacob Gancarczyk	So
LB	18	Chad Greenway	Fr
LB	52	Abdul Hodge	Fr
LB	50	George Lewis	Jr
LB	30	Ryan Majerus	Fr
LB	27	Edmond Miles	Fr
LB	38	Matt Neubauer	Fr
LB	57	Tom Revak	So
LB	42	Grant Steen	Jr
LB	53	Kevin Worthy	Jr
LB	47	Eric Zilisch	Fr
DB	20	Antwan Allen	Fr
DB	4	Scott Boleyn	Sr
DB	37	Sean Considine	So
DB	36	Chigozie Ejiasi	So
DB	17	Aramis Haralson	So
DB	5	D. J. Johnson	Sr
DB	26	Jovon Johnson	Fr
DB	25	Derek Pagel	Sr
DB	39	Marcus Paschal	Fr
DB	7	Jermire Roberts	Jr
DB	33	Bob Sanders	Jr
DB	14	Adolphus Shelton	Fr
DB	19	Chris Smith	Jr
DB	41	Richey Williams	Fr

Special teams

Pos.	#	Name	Class
K	95	Nate Kaeding	Jr
K	1	Kyle Schlicher	Fr
P	28	David Bradley	So
P	91	John Gallery	Fr

Head coach

- Kirk Ferentz

Coordinators/assistant coaches

- Ken O'Keefe – Offensive Coordinator/Quarterbacks
- Norm Parker – Defensive Coordinator/Linebackers
- Ron Aiken – Defensive line
- Lester Erb – Receivers/Special Teams
- Carl Jackson – Running backs
- Reese Morgan – Recruiting/Tight Ends
- Phil Parker – Defensive Backs
- Joe Philbin – Offensive line
- Darrell Wilson – Linebackers and Special Teams
- Chris Doyle – Strength and Conditioning
- Eric Johnson – Recruiting Coordinator
- A.J. Blazek – Graduate Assistant

Legend

- (C) Team captain
- (S) Suspended
- (I) Ineligible
- Injured
- Redshirt

== Statistics ==
Team statistics. On offense, the Hawkeyes gained an average of 210.3 passing yards and 214.2 rushing yards per game. They led the Big Ten in scoring offense with an average of 37.2 points per game.

On defense, they gave up 273.4 passing yards and 81.9 rushing yards per game. They ranked third in the conference in scoring defense, giving up an average of 19.7 points per game.

Passing. Quarterback Brad Banks completed 170 of 294 passes (57.8%) for 2,573 yards, 26 touchdowns, five interceptions, and a 157.1 passer rating.

Rushing. Running back Fred Russel led the team with 1,264 rushing yards and nine rushing touchdowns on 220 carries for an average of 5.7 yards per carry.

Jermelle Lewis ranked second with 709 rushing yards on 123 carries for an average of 5.8 yards per carry.

Quarterback Brad Lewis added 423 rushing yards on 81 carries for an average of 5.2 yards per carry.

Receiving. Wide receiver Maurice Brown led the team with 48 receptions for 966 yards and 11 touchdowns. Other receivers included Dallas Clark (43 receptions, 742 yards), C.J. Jones (38 receptions, 468 yards), and Ed Hinkel (22 receptions, 218 yards).

Scoring. Kicker Nate Kaeding led the team in scoring with 120 points, converting 57 of 58 extra points and 21 of 24 field goal attempts. Other leading scorers were Maurice Brown (66 points), C. J. Jones (60 points), Jermelle Lewis (60 points), and Fred Russell (54 points).

== Awards and honors ==
Quarterback Brad Banks, who entered the season having never started a Division I football game, won the Associated Press College Football Player of the Year Award the Davey O'Brien Award (best quarterback in college football), and the Chicago Tribune Silver Football (most valuable player in the Big Ten Conference). He finished second to Carson Palmer in close voting for the 2002 Heisman Trophy, Palmer receiving 1,328 points to 1,095 for Banks. He was also selected as Big Ten Offensive Player of the Year.

Kirk Ferentz won national honors as the AP college football coach of the year and the Walter Camp Coach of the Year. He also received the Big Ten Coach of the Year award.

Nate Kaeding won the Lou Groza Award, presented to the nation's best kicker. Also received first-team All-American honors along with Ohio State kicker Mike Nugent.

Dallas Clark won the John Mackey Award, given to the nation's best tight end. He was also a consensus first-team All-American.

Eric Steinbach was selected as Big Ten Offensive Lineman of the Year and was a consensus first-team All-American.

Bruce Nelson also received first-team All-American honors.

== 2003 NFL draft ==
Player	Position	Round	Pick	NFL club
Dallas Clark	Tight End	1	24	Indianapolis Colts
Eric Steinbach	Guard	2	33	Cincinnati Bengals
Bruce Nelson	Center	2	50	Carolina Panthers
Derek Pagel	Defensive Back	5	140	New York Jets
Ben Sobieski	Guard	5	151	Buffalo Bills
