= 2003 Orange Bowl =

2003 FedEx Orange Bowl
- BCS Bowl Game; 69th Orange Bowl
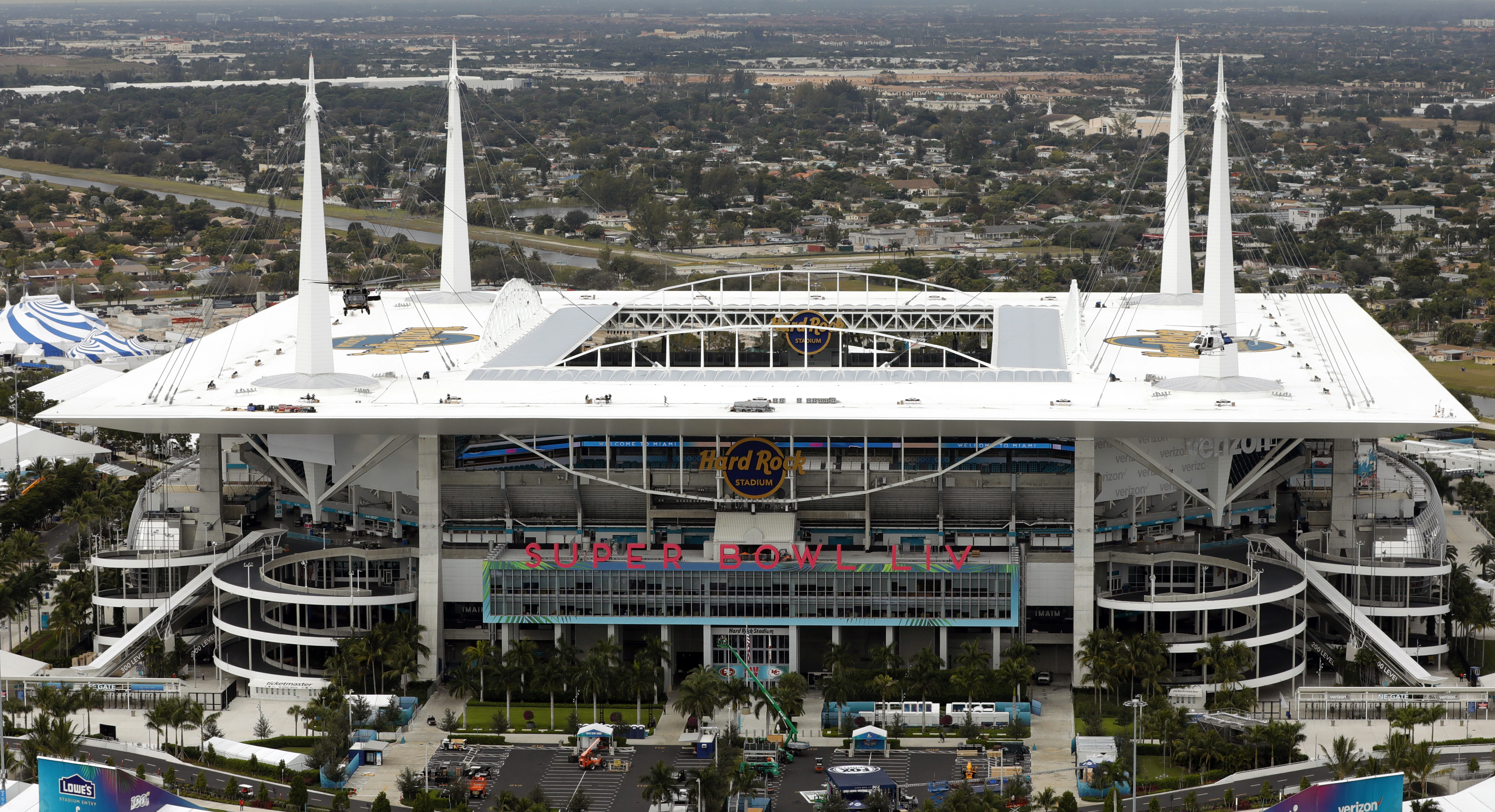
- Pro Player Stadium in Miami Gardens, Florida, hosted the Orange Bowl.
Iowa Hawkeyes	USC Trojans
(11–1)	(10–2)
Big Ten	Pac-10
17	38
Head coach: Kirk Ferentz	Head coach: Pete Carroll
AP / Coaches / BCS; 3 / 3 / 5	AP / Coaches / BCS; 5 / 5 / 4
	1	2	3	4	Total
Iowa	10	0	0	7	17
USC	7	3	14	14	38
- Date: January 2, 2003
- Season: 2002
- Stadium: Pro Player Stadium
- Location: Miami Gardens, Florida
- MVP: Carson Palmer (USC QB)
- Favorite: USC by 4.5 (55.5)
- Referee: Jack Childress (ACC)
- Halftime show: Default, Shaggy
- Attendance: 75,971

United States TV coverage
- Network: ABC
- Announcers: Tim Brant (play-by-play); Ed Cunningham (analyst); Sam Ryan (sideline)
- Nielsen ratings: 9.7

The 2003 FedEx Orange Bowl was the 69th edition of the college football bowl game, played at Pro Player Stadium in Miami Gardens, Florida, on Thursday, January 2. It matched the third-ranked Iowa Hawkeyes of the Big Ten Conference and the USC Trojans of the Pacific-10 Conference. Tied at halftime, favored USC pulled away in the second half to win, 38–17.

Televised in the United States on ABC, the game was part of the 2002–03 Bowl Championship Series (BCS) of the 2002 NCAA Division I-A football season and represented the concluding game of the season for both teams.

== Teams ==
Prior to the BCS, the New Year's Day pairings never would have occurred. The Rose Bowl normally features the champions of the Big Ten (in 2002, the Ohio State Buckeyes) and the Pac-10. However, because the Buckeyes had finished No. 2 in the BCS, they were set to play in the Fiesta Bowl for the national championship against the Miami Hurricanes.

The Orange Bowl had the next pick after the Fiesta, and No. 3 (#5 BCS) Iowa was chosen. The Rose Bowl had the next BCS selection. The next, best available team to choose was No. 8 (#7 BCS) Oklahoma, who won the Big 12 Championship Game, to play Pac-10 winner Washington State in the Rose Bowl. When it came time for the Orange Bowl and Sugar Bowl to make a second pick, both wanted USC. However, a BCS rule stated that if two bowls want the same team, the bowl with the higher payoff has the option. The Orange Bowl immediately extended an at-large bid to the #5 Trojans and paired them with at-large #3 Iowa in a Big Ten/Pac-10 "Rose Bowl" matchup in the Orange Bowl. Rose Bowl committee executive director Mitch Dorger was not pleased with the results. This left the Sugar Bowl with #14 BCS Florida State, the winner of the Atlantic Coast Conference. Notre Dame at 10–2 and No. 9 in the BCS standings was invited to the Gator Bowl. Kansas State at No. 8 also was left out.

=== Iowa Hawkeyes ===
The Hawkeyes tied for the Big Ten conference championship with Ohio State, and they did not meet this season. Iowa's only setback was a five-point loss to in-state rival Iowa State in mid-September.

=== USC Trojans ===
On October 5, in the 300th game for USC on live television, the Trojans lost 30–27 in overtime at Washington State. The Cougars scored with 1:50 left to play to force overtime. The two tied for first place in the Pac-10, but the Cougars won the tie-breaker by virtue of the head-to-head victory. The final game of the conference season was moved to December 2, with WSU at UCLA. Originally it was thought that the Bruins would be the team playing for the Rose Bowl. A 52–21 loss to USC put the Bruins out of contention and the Trojans and Cougars in. The Cougars defeated UCLA 48–27 in Pasadena to advance to the Rose Bowl on New Year's Day; it was the final game for UCLA head coach Bob Toledo, who was soon fired.

This was only the second time a Pac-10 team appeared in the Orange Bowl; eighteen years earlier, Washington won in January 1985.

== Game summary ==
=== Scoring ===
First quarter

- Iowa – C. J. Jones 100-yard kickoff return (Nate Kaeding kick)
- USC – Justin Fargas 4-yard run (Ryan Killeen kick)
- Iowa – Kaeding 35-yard field goal

Second quarter

- USC – Killeen 35-yard field goal

Third quarter

- USC – Williams 18-yard pass from Carson Palmer (Killeen kick)
- USC – Fargas 50-yard run (Killeen kick)

Fourth quarter

- USC – Sultan McCullough 5-yard run (Killeen kick)
- USC – Sunny Byrd 6-yard run (Killeen kick)
- Iowa – Maurice Brown 18-yard pass from Brad Banks (Kaeding kick)

== Statistics ==
Statistics	IOWA	USC
First downs	18	30
Plays–yards	58–323	80–550
Rushes–yards	22–119	49–247
Passing yards	204	303
Passing: comp–att–int	15–36–1	21–31–0
Time of possession	21:54	38:06

Team	Category	Player	Statistics
Iowa	Passing	Brad Banks	15/36, 204 yds, 1 TD, 1 INT
Iowa	Rushing	Fred Russell	9 car, 45 yds
Iowa	Receiving	Dallas Clark	4 rec, 97 yds
USC	Passing	Carson Palmer	21/31, 303 yds, 1 TD
USC	Rushing	Justin Fargas	20 car, 122 yds, 2 TD
USC	Receiving	Mike Williams	6 rec, 99 yds, 1 TD
