= Ladell Betts =

American football player and coach (born 1979)

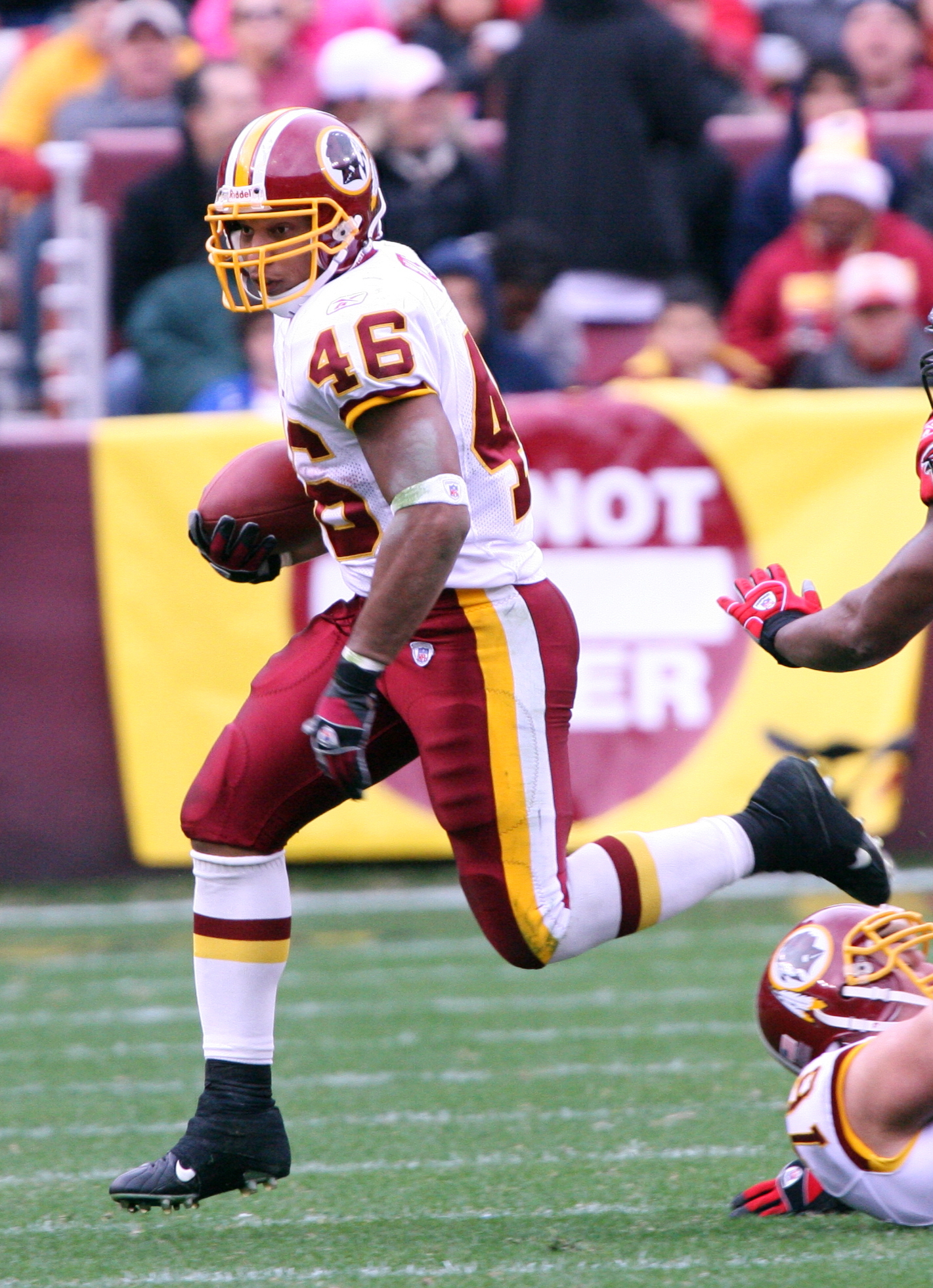
- Betts with the Washington Redskins in 2006

Miami Dolphins
- Title: Running backs coach

Personal information
- Born: August 27, 1979 (age 47); Kansas City, Kansas, U.S.
- Listed height: 5 ft 11 in (1.80 m)
- Listed weight: 224 lb (102 kg)

Career information
- Position: Running back (No. 46)
- High school: Blue Springs (Blue Springs, Missouri)
- College: Iowa (1997–2001)
- NFL draft: 2002: 2nd round, 56th overall pick

Career history

Playing
- Washington Redskins (2002–2009); New Orleans Saints (2010)

Coaching
- Coral Springs Christian Academy (2013) Running backs coach; Boca Raton HS (2014–2015) Offensive coordinator; Pine Crest School (2016–2018) Offensive coordinator; Pine Crest School (2019–2020) Head coach; Iowa (2021–2024) Running backs coach; New York Giants ({{nfly|2025}}) Running backs coach; Miami Dolphins ({{nfly|2026}}–present) Running backs coach

Awards and highlights
- 2× Second-team All-Big Ten (1999, 2001)

Career NFL statistics
- Rushing attempts: 821
- Rushing yards: 3,326
- Receptions: 188
- Receiving yards: 1,646
- Return yards: 2,085
- Total touchdowns: 19
- Stats at Pro Football Reference

Ladell Betts (born August 27, 1979) is an American football coach and former running back who is the former running backs coach for the New York Giants. He played college football for the Iowa Hawkeyes and was selected by the Washington Redskins in the second round of the 2002 NFL draft.

== Early life ==
Betts grew up as an only child with a single mother who worked two and three jobs to make ends meet. He and his mother moved from Kansas City, Missouri, to the suburb of Blue Springs when Betts was a child, but he remained very close to his father who has always been an active influence on Ladell over the years. He attended Blue Springs High School, where he would become a football star. He was teammates with fellow future NFL player Brandon Lloyd.

Betts, who was also a sprinter in high school, gained 1,813 yards and had 34 touchdowns as a high school junior. As a senior, he rushed for 2,183 yards and 32 touchdowns while playing most of the season with a broken right hand. Betts, who led his team to a 10–1 record, was named USA Today's Missouri Player of the Year after earning first-team all-state and all-metro honors. He also earned the Thomas Simone Award, which goes to the best high school player in the Kansas City area, and was named a Parade and SuperPrep All-American.

== College career ==
After redshirting in 1997 at the University of Iowa, Betts played in all 11 games as a freshman. He set school records for rushing yards in a game and a season by a freshman. Betts led the team in rushing for the season and was Iowa's offensive MVP in four games. He was an honorable mention All-Big Ten selection.

In 1999, Betts started all 11 games, led the team in rushing again, and was named Iowa's co-MVP. He was also a second-team All-Big Ten selection. As a junior in 2000, Betts started every game and accounted for Iowa's entire rushing offense. He had 1,090 yards rushing in 2000; the Iowa Hawkeye team had 1,090 yards rushing that year. Betts was an honorable mention All-Big Ten selection.

Betts again led Iowa in rushing as a senior, starting every game. He was Iowa's co-captain and co-MVP for the 2001 season, and he was named second-team All-Big Ten. He helped lead the Hawkeyes to the Alamo Bowl that season, but he had only two carries before being forced to leave due to an injury in Iowa's 19–16 win.

Betts started 43 games in his career and finished as Iowa's #2 all-time leading rusher with 3,686 career yards. He scored 25 touchdowns in his career and added 702 yards receiving. He is the only Hawkeye to ever lead the team in rushing in four different seasons.

Betts came to the University of Iowa to play for Hall of Fame coach Hayden Fry. But Fry retired after Betts' freshman season, and Betts played his last three years for Kirk Ferentz.

== Professional career ==
Pre-draft measurables
Height	Weight	Arm length	Hand span	40-yard dash	10-yard split	20-yard split	20-yard shuttle	Three-cone drill	Vertical jump	Broad jump	Bench press
5 ft 10 1/2 in (1.79 m)	220 lb (100 kg)	30 1/2 in (0.77 m)	9 in (0.23 m)	4.56 s	1.58 s	2.64 s	4.06 s	7.06 s	38.0 in (0.97 m)	9 ft 8 in (2.95 m)	23 reps
All values from NFL Combine

=== Washington Redskins ===
Betts was drafted in the second round (56th overall) of the 2002 NFL draft by the Washington Redskins. He played his first game when the Redskins met the San Francisco 49ers on September 22, 2002. On December 22, 2002, he set career highs, rushing for 116 yards and a touchdown. At the end of the season, Betts rushed 65 times for 307 yards his rookie season. He also had a touchdown of 27 yards. Betts caught 12 passes for 154 yards which included a 40-yard long. He led the team in kickoff returns, returning 28 for 690 yards (a 24.6 average).

Betts played nine games in 2003. He finished the season with 225 rushing yards, two touchdowns, and 59 kick return yards. Betts also caught 15 passes for 167 yards. He missed seven games due to a fractured left forearm.

As a backup to Clinton Portis, Betts rushed for 371 yards on 90 carries (4.1 average) and a touchdown in 2004. He had 15 catches for 108 yards. His longest run was a 27-yarder against the Minnesota Vikings when Portis was injured.

Betts missed three games in 2005 due to injury but managed to play in 12. He finished the season with 338 yards on 89 carries and a touchdown. He caught ten passes for 78 yards and a touchdown pass. In Week 10 against the Tampa Bay Buccaneers, Betts made his first kickoff return for a touchdown of his career with 94-yarder.

In the 2006 season, Betts set career highs in several different areas as he filled in for the injured Clinton Portis, starting nine games as well as receiving significant carries spelling the end of Portis' tenure. He totalled 1,154 rushing yards with a 4.7 yards per carry average and four rushing touchdowns. He also caught 53 passes for 445 yards and one touchdown.

On December 10, 2006, Betts set a career-high with 171 yards rushing in a game.

Betts is the only running back in the history of the Redskins franchise to record consecutive 150 yard rushing games.

In a 2009 preseason game against the Baltimore Ravens, his jersey misspelled his last name as it said Bettis, as most would consider thinking about former Steelers halfback Jerome Bettis.

He was released on March 4, 2010.

=== New Orleans Saints ===
Betts signed a one-year contract for the New Orleans Saints on August 16, 2010. He was cut by New Orleans on September 3. However, after Reggie Bush suffered a broken leg in the Saints' second game, the Saints again signed Betts on September 22. He sustained a neck injury and concussion in a Week 11 game against the Seattle Seahawks, and ultimately was placed on injured reserve on December 8.

== NFL career statistics ==
Legend
**Bold**	Career high

Year	Team	Games		Rushing					Receiving				
Year	Team	G	GS	Att	Yds	Avg	Lng	TD	Rec	Yds	Avg	Lng	TD
2002	WAS	11	0	65	307	**4.7**	**27**	1	12	154	**12.8**	**40**	0
2003	WAS	9	1	77	255	3.3	13	2	15	167	11.1	34	0
2004	WAS	16	1	90	371	4.1	**27**	1	15	108	7.2	20	0
2005	WAS	12	0	89	338	3.8	22	1	10	78	7.8	26	**1**
2006	WAS	16	9	**245**	**1,154**	**4.7**	26	**4**	**53**	**445**	8.4	34	**1**
2007	WAS	16	0	93	335	3.6	20	1	21	174	8.3	28	**1**
2008	WAS	13	0	61	206	3.4	14	1	22	200	9.1	27	0
2009	WAS	10	2	56	210	3.8	18	2	17	179	10.5	25	0
2010	NO	8	1	45	150	3.3	12	2	23	141	6.1	25	0
Career		111	14	821	3,326	4.1	27	15	188	1,646	8.8	40	3

== Coaching career ==
Betts joined the coaching staff at his alma mater Iowa in 2021.

On February 24, 2025, Betts joined the New York Giants as the running backs coach on Brian Daboll's staff.

On February 13, 2026, the Miami Dolphins hired Betts as their running backs coach.
