= Davey O'Brien Award =

College football award

- Awarded for: The collegiate American football player judged to be the best of all NCAA quarterbacks (current); The best NCAA football player playing in the southwestern United States (original)
- Location: The Fort Worth Club, Fort Worth Texas
- Country: United States
- Presented by: Davey O'Brien Foundation

History
- First award: 1977; became a quarterback-only award in 1981
- Most recent: Fernando Mendoza, Indiana
- Website: www.daveyobrienaward.org

The Davey O'Brien Award, officially the Davey O'Brien National Quarterback Award, named after Davey O'Brien, is presented annually to the collegiate American football player judged by the Davey O'Brien Foundation to be the best of all National Collegiate Athletic Association quarterbacks. The Davey O'Brien Hall of Fame is housed at The Fort Worth Club in Fort Worth, Texas. The annual awards dinner and trophy presentation is held there as well, usually in February.

In 1977, directly after the death of O'Brien, the award was established as the Davey O'Brien Memorial Trophy, and was given to the most outstanding player in the Southwest. Texas running back Earl Campbell won the trophy in 1977, Oklahoma running back Billy Sims won it in 1978, and Baylor linebacker Mike Singletary won it twice in 1979 and 1980.

In 1981, the award was renamed the Davey O'Brien Award and given to the nation's top quarterback. Since then, only four players have won the award more than once: Ty Detmer of BYU, Danny Wuerffel of Florida, Jason White of Oklahoma, and Deshaun Watson of Clemson.

== Winners ==
Davey O'Brien Memorial Trophy winners
Year	Player	Position	School
1977	Earl Campbell	Running back	Texas
1978	Billy Sims	Running back	Oklahoma
1979	Mike Singletary	Linebacker	Baylor
1980	Mike Singletary (2)	Linebacker	Baylor (2)

Davey O'Brien National Quarterback Award winners
Year	Player	School	Ref
1981	Jim McMahon	BYU	
1982	Todd Blackledge	Penn State	
1983	Steve Young	BYU	
1984	Doug Flutie	Boston College	
1985	Chuck Long	Iowa	
1986	Vinny Testaverde	Miami (FL)	
1987	Don McPherson	Syracuse	
1988	Troy Aikman	UCLA	
1989	Andre Ware	Houston	
1990	Ty Detmer	BYU (3)	
1991	Ty Detmer (2)	BYU (4)	
1992	Gino Torretta	Miami (FL) (2)	
1993	Charlie Ward	Florida State	
1994	Kerry Collins	Penn State (2)	
1995	Danny Wuerffel	Florida	
1996	Danny Wuerffel (2)	Florida (2)	
1997	Peyton Manning	Tennessee	
1998	Michael Bishop	Kansas State	
1999	Joe Hamilton	Georgia Tech	
2000	Chris Weinke	Florida State (2)	
2001	Eric Crouch	Nebraska	
2002	Brad Banks	Iowa (2)	
2003	Jason White	Oklahoma	
2004	Jason White (2)	Oklahoma (2)	
2005	Vince Young	Texas	
2006	Troy Smith	Ohio State	
2007	Tim Tebow	Florida (3)	
2008	Sam Bradford	Oklahoma (3)	
2009	Colt McCoy	Texas (2)	
2010	Cam Newton	Auburn	
2011	Robert Griffin III	Baylor	
2012	Johnny Manziel	Texas A&M	
2013	Jameis Winston	Florida State (3)	
2014	Marcus Mariota	Oregon	
2015	Deshaun Watson	Clemson	
2016	Deshaun Watson (2)	Clemson (2)	
2017	Baker Mayfield	Oklahoma (4)	
2018	Kyler Murray	Oklahoma (5)	
2019	Joe Burrow	LSU	
2020	Mac Jones	Alabama	
2021	Bryce Young	Alabama (2)	
2022	Max Duggan	TCU	
2023	Jayden Daniels	LSU (2)	
2024	Cam Ward	Miami (FL) (3)	
2025	Fernando Mendoza	Indiana	
