= AP College Football Player of the Year =

Annually award to the most outstanding collegiate football player in the country

- Awarded for: The most outstanding collegiate football player
- Country: United States
- Presented by: Associated Press

History
- First award: 1998
- Most recent: Fernando Mendoza, QB, Indiana
- Website: https://apnews.com/sports

The AP College Football Player of the Year award has been awarded annually since 1998 to the most outstanding collegiate football player in the country. The winner is chosen by a vote of Associated Press (AP) sportswriters and editors. Since 2004, the award winner has gone on to win the Heisman Trophy during the same voting cycle in every year except 2009 (Ndamukong Suh) and 2015 (Christian McCaffrey).

== Winners ==
Season	Player	Position	School	Ref
1998	Ricky Williams	RB	Texas	
1999	Ron Dayne	RB	Wisconsin	
2000	Josh Heupel	QB	Oklahoma	
2001	Rex Grossman	QB	Florida	
2002	Brad Banks	QB	Iowa	
2003	Jason White	QB	Oklahoma	
2004	Matt Leinart	QB	USC	
2005	Reggie Bush	RB	USC	
2006	Troy Smith	QB	Ohio State	
2007	Tim Tebow	QB	Florida	
2008	Sam Bradford	QB	Oklahoma	
2009	Ndamukong Suh	DT	Nebraska	
2010	Cam Newton	QB	Auburn	
2011	Robert Griffin III	QB	Baylor	
2012	Johnny Manziel	QB	Texas A&M	
2013	Jameis Winston	QB	Florida State	
2014	Marcus Mariota	QB	Oregon	
2015	Christian McCaffrey	RB	Stanford	
2016	Lamar Jackson	QB	Louisville	
2017	Baker Mayfield	QB	Oklahoma	
2018	Kyler Murray	QB	Oklahoma	
2019	Joe Burrow	QB	LSU	
2020	DeVonta Smith	WR	Alabama	
2021	Bryce Young	QB	Alabama	
2022	Caleb Williams	QB	USC	
2023	Jayden Daniels	QB	LSU	
2024	Travis Hunter	CB/WR	Colorado	
2025	Fernando Mendoza	QB	Indiana	

== Winners by school ==
School	Winners
Oklahoma	5
USC	3
Alabama	2
Florida	2
LSU	2
Auburn	1
Baylor	1
Colorado	1
Florida State	1
Indiana	1
Iowa	1
Louisville	1
Nebraska	1
Ohio State	1
Oregon	1
Stanford	1
Texas	1
Texas A&M	1
Wisconsin	1
