= Erik Jensen (American football) =

American football player (born 1980)

Profile
- Position: Tight end

Personal information
- Born: October 11, 1980 (age 46); Appleton, Wisconsin, U.S.

Career information
- College: Iowa
- NFL draft: 2004: 7th round, 237th overall pick

Career history
- St. Louis Rams (2004); San Francisco 49ers (2005)*; Pittsburgh Steelers (2005–2006)*; Dallas Cowboys (2006)*; Rhein Fire (2007); Cincinnati Bengals (2007)*
- * Offseason or practice squad member only

Erik Jensen (born October 11, 1980) is an American former professional football player who was a tight end in the National Football League (NFL). He was selected by the St. Louis Rams in the seventh round of the 2004 NFL draft. He played college football for the Iowa Hawkeyes. Jensen was also a member of the San Francisco 49ers, Pittsburgh Steelers, Dallas Cowboys and Cincinnati Bengals.

== Early life ==
Jensen attended Appleton East High School in his hometown of Appleton, Wisconsin. He was honorable mention All-conference on both offense and defense as a sophomore. Jensen was a second-team all-state linebacker as a junior and senior and was a unanimous First-team All-conference selection as both fullback and linebacker in final two prep seasons.

His career totals on offense include 455 attempts for 2,808 yards and 44 touchdowns, an average of 6.2 yards per carry and also had 41 receptions for 607 yards and six touchdowns. As a senior rushed for 1, 463 yards on 221 attempts and scored 24 touchdowns, with 14 catches for 245 yards and two scores. Jensen rushed for 1,104 yards and 12 touchdowns as a junior. His career defensive totals include 375 tackles, with 145 solo stops and 230 assists with 20 tackles for loss, nine interceptions, 13 caused fumbles, 13 recovered fumbles, 12 knockdowns and nine QB sacks. He totaled 154 tackles and five interceptions as a senior and 133 tackles as a junior. He also competed in baseball and powerlifting as a prep. As a senior won state title in powerlifting, lifting a career-best total of 1,450 pounds in the bench press, squat and dead-lift.

== College career ==
Jensen attended the University of Iowa, where he played for the Iowa Hawkeyes football team. After redshirting in 1999, he played in nine games in 2000 and had two catches for 37 yards and one touchdown. In 2001 Jensen played in 11 of 12 games. In 2002, he was Academic All-Big Ten. He saw action in first two games of the year but missed the remaining games with an injury. As a senior in 2003, Jensen was Academic All-Big Ten after catching 16 passes for 182 yards for an 11.4 average and one touchdown. He played as a backup to Dallas Clark for much of his career, recording 24 catches in four seasons.

== Professional career ==
Pre-draft measurables
Height	Weight	40-yard dash	10-yard split	20-yard split	20-yard shuttle	Three-cone drill	Vertical jump	Broad jump	Bench press	Wonderlic
6 ft 2 1/4 in (1.89 m)	254 lb (115 kg)	4.63 s	x s	x s	4.08 s	6.65 s	36 in (0.91 m)	9 ft 9 in (2.97 m)	23 reps	x
from Iowa Pro Day.

Jensen was selected by the St. Louis Rams in the seventh round (237th overall) of the 2004 NFL draft. He signed a three-year contract with the team the following month.
