= 2001 Alamo Bowl =

2001 Sylvania Alamo Bowl
Iowa Hawkeyes	Texas Tech Red Raiders
(6–5)	(7–4)
Big Ten	Big 12
19	16
Head coach: Kirk Ferentz	Head coach: Mike Leach
	1	2	3	4	Total
Iowa	3	7	3	6	19
Texas Tech	0	3	7	6	16
- Date: December 29, 2001
- Season: 2001
- Stadium: Alamodome
- Location: San Antonio, Texas
- MVP: Aaron Greving, Iowa RB (offense); Derrick Pickens, Iowa DL (defense)
- Referee: Frank White (WAC)
- Attendance: 65,232

United States TV coverage
- Network: ESPN
- Announcers: Ron Franklin, Mike Gottfried, and Adrian Karsten

The 2001 Alamo Bowl featured the Iowa Hawkeyes, and the Texas Tech Red Raiders. It was a rematch of the 1996 Alamo Bowl.

== Game summary ==
Nate Kaeding scored the first points of the game for Iowa, as he connected on a 36-yard field goal, to give Iowa an early 3–0 lead. In the second quarter, running back Aaron Greving scored on a 1-yard touchdown run to increase Iowa's lead to 10–0. At the end of the half kicker Clinton Greathouse kicked a 50-yard field goal to pull Tech to within 10–3.

In the third quarter, quarterback Kliff Kingsbury connected with wide receiver Wes Welker for a 20-yard touchdown pass to tie the game at 10. Later in the quarter, Kaeding connected on a 31-yard field goal to give Iowa the lead again, at 13–10. In the fourth quarter, he kicked another field goal, this one from 46 yards out to give Iowa a 16–10 lead.

Iowa's defense continued to force Texas Tech to attempt field goals rather than score touchdowns. Robert Treece kicked a 23-yard field goal to cut Iowa's lead to 16–13. Tech's defense held, and Tech got the ball back. This time, Robert Treece kicked a 37-yard field goal to tie the game at 16. Kaeding provided the winning score, kicking a 47-yard field goal, to make the final score 19–16.

As time expired, a Kliff Kingsbury pass to future NFL Hall of Famer Wes Welker was knocked away by future NFL Defensive Player of the Year Bob Sanders.

2001 Sylvania Alamo Bowl

Quarter	1	2	3	4	Total
Hawkeyes	3	7	3	6	19
Red Raiders	0	3	7	6	16

at Alamodome • San Antonio, Texas

- Date: Saturday, December 28, 2001
- Game time: 6:40 p.m. CST
- Game weather: Indoor • Temperature: 74 °F (23 °C)
- Game attendance: 65,232
- Referee: Frank White (WAC)
- TV announcers (ESPN): Ron Franklin (play-by-play), Mike Gottfried (analyst), and Adrian Karsten (sideline)
- Box score

Game information

First quarter

- (5:45) IOWA – Nate Kaeding 36-yard field goal Iowa 3–0)

Second quarter

- (3:19) IOWA – Aaron Greving 1-yard run (Nate Kaeding kick) Iowa 10–0)
- (0:00) TTU – Clinton Greathouse 50-yard field goal Iowa 10–3)

Third quarter

- (11:36) TTU – Wes Welker 20-yard pass from Kliff Kingsbury (Robert Treece kick) Tied 10–10)
- (5:12) IOWA – Nate Kaeding 31-yard field goal Iowa 13–10)

Fourth quarter

- (14:56) IOWA – Nate Kaeding 46-yard field goal Iowa 16–10)
- (8:29) TTU – Robert Treece 23-yard field goal Iowa 16–13)
- (2:05) TTU – Robert Treece 37-yard field goal Tied 16–16)
- (0:44) IOWA – Nate Kaeding 47-yard field goal Iowa 19–16)

=== Statistics ===
Statistics	IOWA	TTU
First downs	20	20
Plays–yards	70–339	69–389
Rushes–yards	44–178	20–80
Passing yards	161	309
Passing: comp–att–int	19–26–0	29–49–3
Time of possession	24:57	35:03

Team	Category	Player	Statistics
IOWA	Passing	Kyle McCann	19/26, 161 yards
IOWA	Rushing	Aaron Greving	25 carries, 115 yards, TD
IOWA	Receiving	Kahlil Hill	6 receptions, 49 yards
Texas Tech	Passing	Kliff Kingsbury	29/49, 309 yards, TD, 3 INT
Texas Tech	Rushing	Kliff Kingsbury	9 carries, 42 yards
Texas Tech	Receiving	Carlos Francis	5 receptions, 90 yards
