= Darrien Johnson =

American football player (born 1980)

No. 34, 32
- Position: Defensive back

Personal information
- Born: May 3, 1980 (age 46); Chicago, Illinois, U.S.
- Listed height: 5 ft 10 in (1.78 m)
- Listed weight: 185 lb (84 kg)

Career information
- High school: Naperville Central (Naperville, Illinois)
- College: Iowa (1998–2002)
- NFL draft: 2003: undrafted

Career history
- Montreal Alouettes (2003–2004); New York Jets (2005–2006); Las Vegas Gladiators (2007)

Career NFL statistics
- Games played: 8
- Tackles: 3
- Stats at Pro Football Reference

Career AFL statistics
- Tackles: 5
- Pass deflections: 2
- Stats at ArenaFan.com
- Stats at CFL.ca

Darrien "D. J." Jermaine Johnson (born May 3, 1980) is an American former professional football defensive back who played in the Canadian football League (CFL) for the Montreal Alouettes and the National Football League (NFL) for the New York Jets. He played college football for the Iowa Hawkeyes. Johnson also had a stint in the Arena Football League (AFL) with the Las Vegas Gladiators.

== Early life ==
Johnson was born on May 3, 1980, in Chicago, Illinois. He attended Naperville Central High School in Naperville, Illinois. On February 4, 1998, Johnson signed a national letter of intent to play college football at University of Iowa.

== College career ==
Johnson played college football for the Iowa Hawkeyes from 1998 to 2002. In 20 starts, he had 102 tackles, three interceptions and 25 pass breakups.

== Professional career ==
=== Montreal Alouettes ===
After going undrafted in the 2003 NFL draft, Johnson signed with the Montreal Alouettes of the Canadian football League (CFL) as an undrafted free agent. On June 15, 2003, Johnson was released by the team and was signed to the practice roster. On July 16, he was promoted to active roster and made his debut three days later against the Calgary Stampeders. Johnson played in 21 games, where he made 26 tackles, one sack, one pass deflection, two interceptions, one forced fumble and two fumble recoveries.

=== New York Jets ===
On January 11, 2005, Johnson signed with the New York Jets of the National Football League (NFL). He played in eight games for the Jets, recording three tackles as a backup cornerback and on special teams. On January 2, 2006, Johnson signed a reserve/future contract. On August 28, he was waived by the team.

=== Las Vegas Gladiators ===
On November 2, 2006, Johnson signed with the Las Vegas Gladiators of the Arena Football League (AFL). He played in two games as a defensive specialist and made five tackles and two pass deflections.
