= Jared Clauss =

American football player (born 1981)

No. 96
- Position: Defensive tackle

Personal information
- Born: April 7, 1981 (age 45); Des Moines, Iowa, U.S.
- Listed height: 6 ft 5 in (1.96 m)
- Listed weight: 294 lb (133 kg)

Career information
- High school: Valley (West Des Moines, Iowa)
- College: Iowa
- NFL draft: 2004: 7th round, 230th overall pick

Career history
- Tennessee Titans (2004–2005); Washington Redskins (2007)*; Oakland Raiders (2007)*
- * Offseason or practice squad member only

Career NFL statistics
- Total tackles: 29
- Sacks: 0.5
- Passes defended: 1
- Stats at Pro Football Reference

Jared Clauss (born April 7, 1981) is an American former professional football player who was a defensive tackle in the National Football League (NFL). He was selected by the Tennessee Titans in the seventh round of the 2004 NFL draft. He played college football for the Iowa Hawkeyes.

== Early life ==
Clauss attended Valley High School in West Des Moines, Iowa.

== College career ==
Clauss played college football for the Iowa Hawkeyes from 2000 to 2003, starting 26 career games. He earned honorable mention All-Big Ten Conference honors his junior and senior years. He also earned Academic All-Big Ten honors all four years of his college career. Clauss was named an honorary captain for the November 18, 2017, game against Purdue.

== Professional career ==
Clauss was selected by the Tennessee Titans in the seventh round, with the 230th overall pick, of the 2004 NFL draft. He officially signed with the team on July 23, 2004. He played in 14 games, starting one, for the Titans in 2004, recording four solo tackles, three assisted tackles and one pass breakup. Clauss appeared in 15 games, starting one, during the 2005 season, totaling 16 solo tackles, six assisted tackles and half a sack. He was waived by the Titans on September 4, 2006.

Clauss signed a reserve/future contract with the Washington Redskins on January 4, 2007. He was waived on August 2, 2007.

Clauss was signed by the Oakland Raiders on August 15, 2007. He was waived by the Raiders on August 27, 2007.

== Personal life ==
Clauss later became a financial advisor with UBS.
