= Tony Jackson (American football) =

American football player (born 1982)

No. 81
- Position: Fullback

Personal information
- Born: July 5, 1982 (age 44); Ypsilanti, Michigan, U.S.
- Listed height: 6 ft 2 in (1.88 m)
- Listed weight: 255 lb (116 kg)

Career information
- High school: Willow Run (Ypsilanti)
- College: Iowa
- NFL draft: 2005: 6th round, 196th overall pick

Career history
- Seattle Seahawks (2005)*; New York Giants (2006)*; Oakland Raiders (2006–2008)*
- * Offseason or practice squad member only

Tony Jackson (born July 5, 1982) is an American former football fullback. He was selected by the Seattle Seahawks in the sixth round of the 2005 NFL draft. He played college football at Iowa.

== Early life ==
Jackson attended Willow Run High School in Ypsilanti, Michigan, where he starred in football, basketball, and track & field. In football, he was a two-time All-Conference pick.

== Professional career ==
=== Seattle Seahawks ===
Jackson was selected by the Seattle Seahawks as a tight end in the sixth round (196th overall) of the 2005 NFL draft. However, he was waived by the team following the preseason.

=== New York Giants ===
Jackson was signed by the New York Giants in the 2006 offseason, but failed to make the team out of training camp and was released.

=== Oakland Raiders ===
Jackson was signed to the practice squad of the Oakland Raiders on October 25, 2006. He was re-signed by the team in the 2007 offseason, but waived on July 24. He again spent time with the team during the 2008 offseason, but was released on July 18.
