= Bruce Nelson (American football) =

American football player (born 1979)

No. 72
- Position: Guard / Center

Personal information
- Born: May 12, 1979 (age 47); Emmetsburg, Iowa, U.S.
- Listed height: 6 ft 5 in (1.96 m)
- Listed weight: 301 lb (137 kg)

Career information
- High school: Emmetsburg
- College: Iowa
- NFL draft: 2003: 2nd round, 50th overall pick

Career history
- Carolina Panthers (2003–2004)

Awards and highlights
- First-team All-American (2002); First-team All-Big Ten (2002)

Career NFL statistics
- Games played: 15
- Games started: 1
- Stats at Pro Football Reference

Bruce Edward Nelson (born May 12, 1979) is an American former professional football player who was a guard and center for the Carolina Panthers of the National Football League (NFL). He played college football for the Iowa Hawkeyes and was selected by the Panthers in the second round of the 2003 NFL draft.

== Early life ==
Nelson was born in Emmetsburg, Iowa, and went to Emmetsburg High School as a high ranked academic athlete.

== College career ==
Nelson played college football for the Iowa Hawkeyes. Nelson was 1st team All-American and 1st team All-Big Ten in his senior season in 2002.

== Professional career ==
Nelson was selected by the Carolina Panthers in the second round of the 2003 NFL draft with the 50th overall pick. His NFL career was limited to two seasons because of hip injuries.

== Personal life ==
Nelson has also served as an assistant coach for the Emmetsburg High School football team. Bruce married his high school girlfriend Jana. They have 4 children. Nora, Vince, Vera, and Gus Nelson.
