= Ben Sobieski =

American football player (born 1979)

No. 64
- Position: Guard

Personal information
- Born: May 3, 1979 (age 47); Saint Paul, Minnesota, U.S.
- Listed height: 6 ft 5 in (1.96 m)
- Listed weight: 307 lb (139 kg)

Career information
- High school: Mahtomedi (MN)
- College: Iowa
- NFL draft: 2003: 5th round, 151st overall pick

Career history
- Buffalo Bills (2003–2005); San Francisco 49ers (2005)

Career NFL statistics
- Games played: 1
- Games started: 0
- Stats at Pro Football Reference

Benjamin James Sobieski (born May 3, 1979) is an American former professional football player. He attended Mahtomedi Senior High School and the University of Iowa before being drafted in the fifth round of the 2003 NFL draft (number 151 overall) by the Buffalo Bills.

A Parade and SuperPrep All-American who also lettered in track and hockey, Sobieski's career was hampered by injuries. He spent six years at Iowa under two head coaches (Hayden Fry and Kirk Ferentz), missing both the 1999 and 2000 seasons due to shoulder injuries.

After being released by Buffalo, Sobieski was signed to the practice squad of the San Francisco 49ers. He was brought up to the regular team, but never played due to injury.
