= Derreck Robinson =

American football player (1982–2025)

No. 98, 75, 67
- Position: Defensive end

Personal information
- Born: March 3, 1982; Minneapolis, Minnesota, U.S.
- Died: August 2025 (aged 43); San Diego, California, U.S.
- Listed height: 6 ft 4 in (1.93 m)
- Listed weight: 290 lb (132 kg)

Career information
- High school: DeLaSalle (Minneapolis)
- College: Iowa (2001–2004)
- NFL draft: 2005: undrafted

Career history
- San Diego Chargers (2005–2006); Miami Dolphins (2007); Dallas Cowboys (2009)*; Cleveland Browns (2009–2010)
- * Offseason or practice squad member only

Career NFL statistics
- Total tackles: 45
- Sacks: 2
- Pass deflections: 3
- Stats at Pro Football Reference

Derreck Lamar Robinson (March 3, 1982 – August 2025) was an American professional football player who was a defensive end in the National Football League (NFL). He played college football for the Iowa Hawkeyes and was signed by the San Diego Chargers as an undrafted free agent in 2005.

Robinson was also a member of the Miami Dolphins, Dallas Cowboys, and Cleveland Browns. He died in San Diego, California, in August 2025, at the age of 43.
