= Fred Russell (American football) =

American gridiron football player (born 1980)

No. 2
- Position: Running back

Personal information
- Born: September 14, 1980 (age 46); Wayne, Michigan, U.S.

Career information
- High school: Romulus (MI)
- College: Iowa

Career history
- Miami Dolphins (2004)*; Chicago Bears (2004–2005)*; St. Louis Rams (2006)*; Saskatchewan Roughriders (2007)
- * Offseason or practice squad member only

Awards and highlights
- First-team All-Big Ten (2002); Second-team All-Big Ten (2003)

Fred Russell (born September 14, 1980) is an American former professional football player who was a running back for the Saskatchewan Roughriders of the Canadian Football League (CFL). He played college football for the Iowa Hawkeyes. He twice rushed for more than 1,000 yards in a season. He was a first-team All-Big Ten Conference selection in 2002 and voted the most valuable player in the 2004 Outback Bowl.

== High school ==
Russell played high school football at Romulus High School in Romulus, Michigan. He rushed for more than 5,000 yards and 85 touchdowns.

== Iowa ==
Russell was the starting running back for the 2002 Iowa Hawkeyes football team that tied for the Big Ten Conference championship, played in the Orange Bowl, and was ranked No. 8 in the final AP Poll. Russell rushed for 1,264 yards and nine touchdowns on 220 carries during the 2002 season. At the end of the season, Russell was selected by Big Ten coaches as a first-team running back on the 2002 All-Big Ten Conference football team.

In 2003, Russell was again the starting running back for an Iowa team that compiled a 10–3 record, defeated Florida in the Outback Bowl, and was ranked No. 8 in the final AP Poll. Russell rushed for 1,355 yards and seven touchdowns on 282 carries during the 2003 season. He was selected by both the coaches and media a second-team running back on the 2003 All-Big Ten Conference football team.

In the 2004 Outback Bowl, Russell's final game for Iowa, he rushed for 150 yards, scored a touchdown, and was named the game's most valuable player in a 37–17 victory over Florida. He was also named the most valuable player in the 2004 Hula Bowl.

At the end of his college career, and despite receiving significant playing time in only two seasons, Russell ranked third on the Iowa career rushing list. He also had two of the top five single-season rushing totals in Iowa history.

== Professional football ==
In 2004, Russell was part of the St. Louis Rams' practice squad. In 2007, Russell signed a contract with the Saskatchewan Roughriders of the CFL. He was released on July 3, 2007.
