= Dallas Clark =

American football player (born 1979)

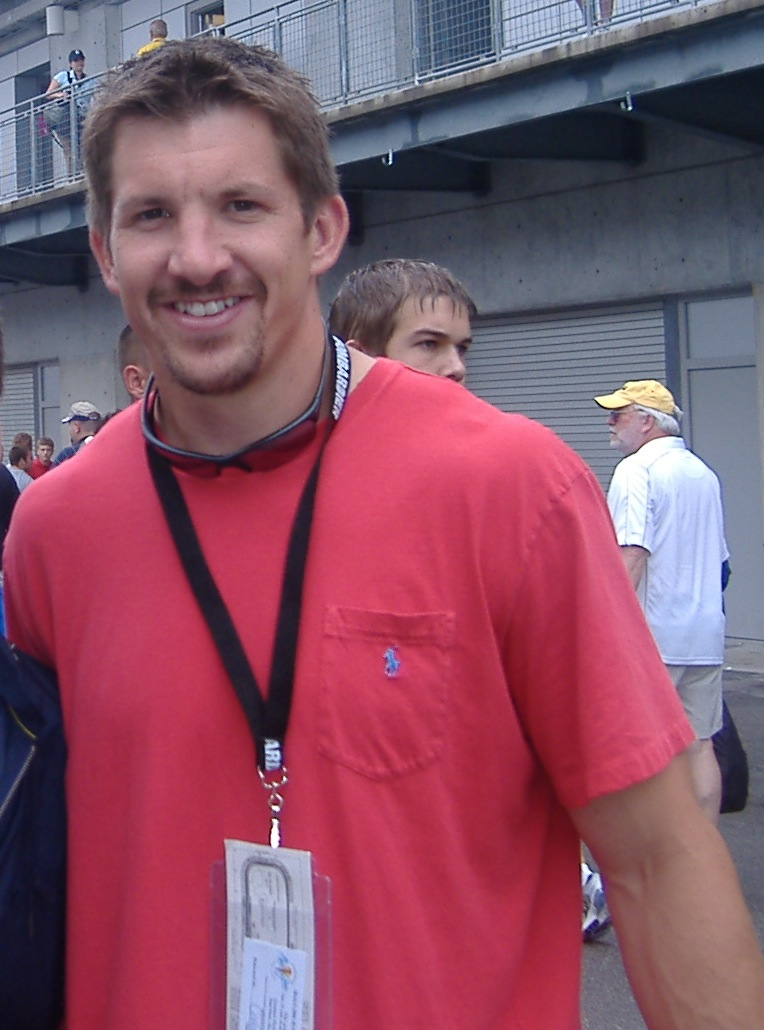
- Clark at the 2007 Indianapolis 500

No. 44, 87
- Position: Tight end

Personal information
- Born: June 12, 1979 (age 47); Sioux Falls, South Dakota, U.S.
- Listed height: 6 ft 3 in (1.91 m)
- Listed weight: 252 lb (114 kg)

Career information
- High school: Twin River Valley (Bode, Iowa)
- College: Iowa (1998–2002)
- NFL draft: 2003: 1st round, 24th overall pick

Career history
- Indianapolis Colts (2003–2011); Tampa Bay Buccaneers (2012); Baltimore Ravens (2013)

Awards and highlights
- Super Bowl champion (XLI); First-team All-Pro (2009); Pro Bowl (2009); NFL Alumni Tight End of the Year (2009); Sports Illustrated NFL All-Pro Team (2008); Football Digest NFL All-Rookie Team (2003); Indianapolis Colts Ring of Honor; Unanimous All-American (2002); John Mackey Award (2002); First-team All-Big Ten (2002)

Career NFL statistics
- Receptions: 505
- Receiving yards: 5,665
- Receiving touchdowns: 53
- Stats at Pro Football Reference

Dallas Dean Clark (born June 12, 1979) is an American former professional football player who was a tight end for 11 seasons in the National Football League (NFL), primarily for the Indianapolis Colts. He played college football for the Iowa Hawkeyes, earning unanimous All-American honors and recognition as the top college tight end in the nation. He was selected by Indianapolis in the first round of the 2003 NFL draft and he was a member of their Super Bowl XLI championship team against the Chicago Bears. He also played in the NFL for the Tampa Bay Buccaneers and the Baltimore Ravens.

== Early life ==
Clark was born in Sioux Falls, South Dakota. He graduated from Twin River Valley High School in Bode, Iowa, where he was a multi-sport star. He earned four letters in football, basketball, and track and three letters in baseball. As a high schooler, he earned honorable mention all-conference honors in football and was second-team all-conference as a sophomore. As a junior, Clark was named his team's most valuable player and a first-team all-conference and honorable mention all-state selection after recording 140 tackles. He was team captain and MVP again as a senior, recording 160 tackles, and earned first-team all-conference and second-team all-state honors.

== College career ==
Clark attended the University of Iowa, where he played for the Iowa Hawkeyes football team from 1999 to 2002. He did not see action during the 1999 season, but he finally saw the field in 2000. He played on special teams and made six tackles during the season as a linebacker. Prior to the 2001 season, the Iowa coaching staff decided to move Clark to the tight end position.

Clark started 10 games at tight end for Iowa in 2001, catching 38 passes for 539 yards and four touchdowns on the season. He also played special teams, recovering an on-side kick to clinch a win against Penn State and recording five tackles on the year. Clark was named honorable mention All-Big Ten Conference.

After being granted a scholarship for 2002, Clark started all 13 games as he helped lead Iowa to its first undefeated conference season in 80 years. Clark was the Big Ten Offensive Player of the Week against Purdue, when he caught three passes for 116 yards and two touchdowns. His first touchdown came in the third quarter, when he broke a Purdue tackle and raced 95 yards for a touchdown. It was the longest pass play in Kinnick Stadium history and the second longest in school history. Clark's second touchdown came with 1:07 left in the game. With the Hawkeyes trailing, 28–24, Clark caught a seven-yard pass on fourth and goal from quarterback Brad Banks to give Iowa a 31–28 win. On the year, Clark finished with 43 catches for 742 yards and 4 touchdowns.

Clark was the 2002 recipient of the John Mackey Award which is presented to the most outstanding tight end in college football, a first-team All-Big Ten selection, and a unanimous first-team All-American. He won the Kenny Yana Award at the end of the 2002 season as well, as he helped lead Iowa to the Big Ten title and an 11–2 record. Although he had one more year of eligibility remaining, Clark decided to enter the 2003 NFL Draft. He left Iowa with 1,281 career receiving yards in just two years at the tight end position.

== Professional career ==
Pre-draft measurables
Height	Weight	Arm length	Hand span	40-yard dash	Vertical jump	Broad jump
6 ft 3 3/8 in (1.91 m)	257 lb (117 kg)	32 in (0.81 m)	10 1/8 in (0.26 m)	4.65 s	37.5 in (0.95 m)	10 ft 3 in (3.12 m)
All values from NFL Combine

=== Indianapolis Colts ===
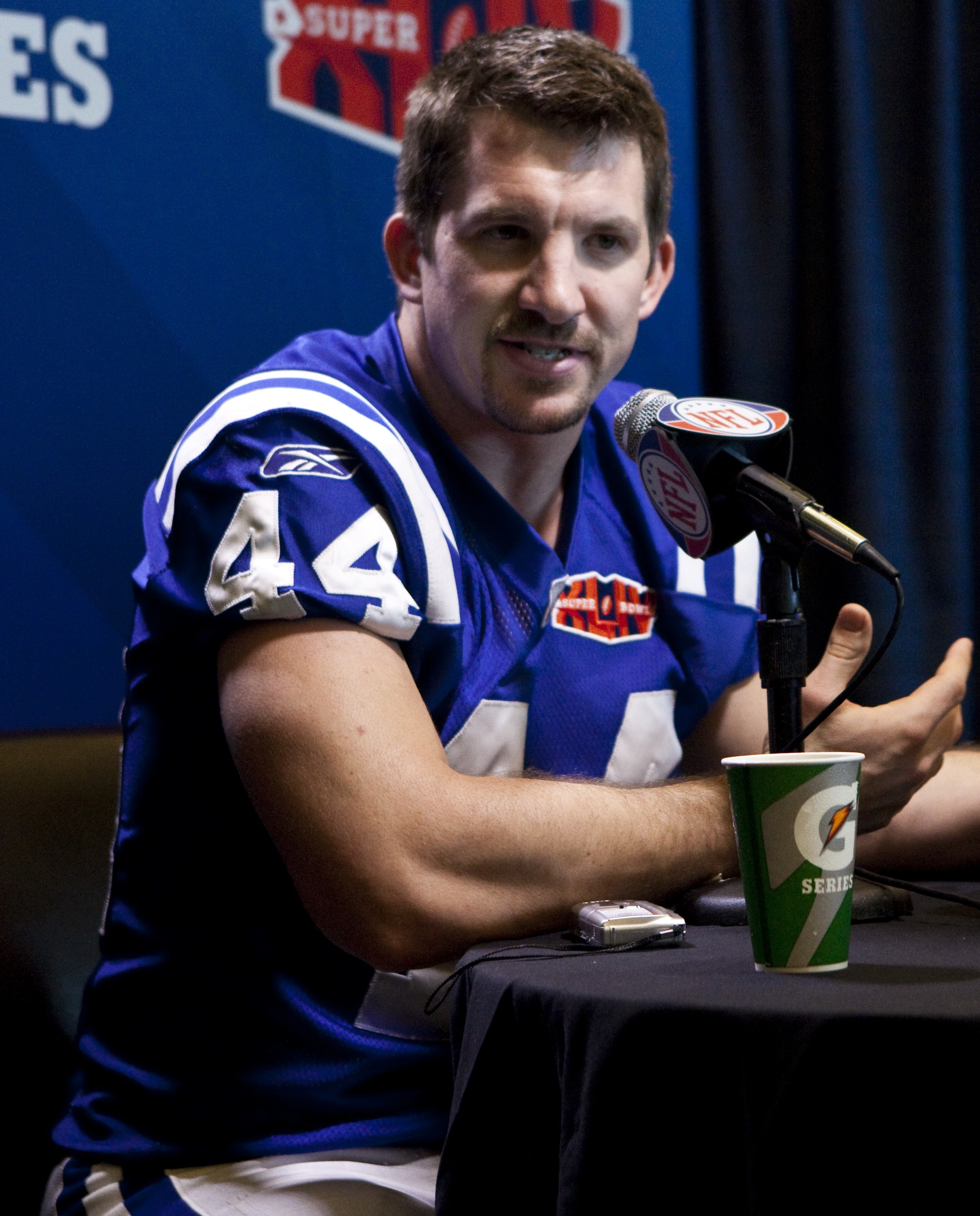
Clark in an interview on Super Bowl XLIV media day

Clark was chosen in the first round of the 2003 NFL draft by the Indianapolis Colts with the 24th overall pick. When drafted, the Colts called Clark a "perfect fit" for their system, eventually replacing Marcus Pollard and Ken Dilger at the position. He started 10 games as a rookie and had 340 receiving yards before suffering a broken leg against the New England Patriots. He started 15 games in 2004 and had 423 yards receiving with five touchdown receptions.

Clark started 15 games in 2005 and caught 37 passes for 488 yards and four touchdowns. He started in 11 games in the 2006 season before suffering a knee injury in the November 26 home game against the Philadelphia Eagles. He returned for the playoffs and played very well leading up to the Colts' first Super Bowl berth since moving to Indianapolis. In the Colts' three playoff games, he caught a total of 17 passes for 281 yards as a member of the 2006 Super Bowl Champion Indianapolis Colts. In the 29–17 victory over the Chicago Bears, he caught four passes for 36 yards and rushed the ball once for a one-yard gain. In 15 starts in 2007 season, Clark had 58 receptions for 616 yards, shattering John Mackey Colts record for receptions for a tight end (55) and touchdowns (11).

On February 19, 2008, the Colts placed the franchise tag on Clark. The next day, the Colts signed him to a six-year contract extension, with his salary averaging $4.5 million per year ($41 million in total), making him the highest paid tight end in the NFL.

On December 28, 2008, Clark broke the Colts' franchise record, held by Hall of Famer John Mackey, for yards in a season by a tight end (848). On September 21, 2009, Clark had career high 183 receiving yards and a touchdown in just seven receptions at the Monday Night Football match up against Miami Dolphins, this is also the fourth highest receiving yards ever for a Tight end in NFL history. On November 8, 2009, against the Houston Texans Clark caught 14 balls; a career-high for him. He was named AFC Offensive Player-of-the-Week because of his performance against Houston. On January 3, 2010, against the Buffalo Bills, Clark caught his 100th reception of the season, the second tight end to do so in NFL history. He ended the 2009 season with 100 catches for 1,106 yards and 10 touchdowns.

On October 17, 2010, Clark sustained a wrist injury playing the Washington Redskins and was put on injured reserve on Friday, October 22, 2010, after season-ending wrist surgery. He completed the season with 37 catches for 347 yards and three touchdowns. He was ranked 78th by his fellow players on the NFL Top 100 Players of 2011.

Clark's surgically repaired wrist would again hinder his production in the 2011 regular season, limiting him to 34 receptions for 357 yards and two touchdowns in only 11 games. This was also the first season Clark played without quarterback Peyton Manning, who missed the entire season rehabbing from offseason neck surgery. Along with Joseph Addai and Gary Brackett, Clark was released by the Colts on March 9, 2012, two days after they released Peyton Manning.

=== Tampa Bay Buccaneers ===
Clark signed a one-year contract with the Tampa Bay Buccaneers on May 21, 2012. He finished the season with 47 receptions for 435 yards and 4 touchdowns.

=== Baltimore Ravens ===
On August 13, 2013, Clark signed a one-year contract with the Baltimore Ravens. He finished the season with 31 receptions for 343 yards and 3 touchdowns.

=== Retirement ===
On June 18, 2014, Clark signed a one-day contract with the Colts, so that he could retire as a member of the team.

== NFL career statistics ==
Year	Team	GP	Receiving				
Year	Team	GP	Rec	Yds	Avg	Lng	TD
2003	IND	10	29	340	11.7	42	1
2004	IND	15	25	423	16.9	80	5
2005	IND	15	37	488	13.2	56	4
2006	IND	12	30	367	12.2	40	4
2007	IND	15	58	616	10.6	39	11
2008	IND	15	77	848	11.0	33	6
2009	IND	16	100	1,106	11.1	80	10
2010	IND	6	37	347	9.4	50	3
2011	IND	11	34	352	10.4	21	2
2012	TB	16	47	435	9.3	33	4
2013	BAL	12	31	343	11.1	45	3
Career		143	505	5,665	11.2	80	53

== Personal life ==
Clark and his wife, Karen have three children (Dane, Camden, Hazel) and live in Livermore, Iowa. They also have a home in Zionsville, Indiana.

Dallas Clark guest starred in the CBS hit show Criminal Minds as San Diego police officer Austin Kent in the episode "The Stranger". Clark said of the experience, "This is fulfilling a dream of mine of being an actor."
