= Brad Banks =

American football player (born 1980)

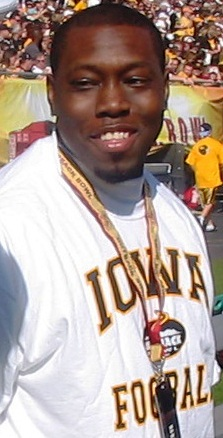
- Banks at the 2009 Outback Bowl

No. 17, 7
- Position: Quarterback

Personal information
- Born: April 22, 1980 (age 46); Belle Glade, Florida, U.S.
- Listed height: 5 ft 11 in (1.80 m)
- Listed weight: 204 lb (93 kg)

Career information
- High school: Glades Central (Belle Glade)
- College: UCF (1998); Hinds (1999–2000); Iowa (2001–2002)
- NFL draft: 2003: undrafted

Career history
- 2003: Washington Redskins*
- 2004: Ottawa Renegades
- 2005–2006: Winnipeg Blue Bombers
- 2007–2008: Montreal Alouettes
- 2009: Berlin Adler
- 2010: Orlando Predators*
- 2011: Iowa Barnstormers
- * Offseason or practice squad member only

Awards and highlights
- AP Player of the Year (2002); Davey O'Brien Award (2002); First-team All-American (2002); Big Ten Most Valuable Player (2002); Big Ten Offensive Player of the Year (2002); First-team All-Big Ten (2002)

Career CFL statistics
- Passing attempts: 179
- Passing completions: 98
- Completion percentage: 54.7%
- TD–INT: 9–8
- Passing yards: 1,195
- Passer rating: 73.7

Brad Banks (born April 22, 1980) is an American former professional football player who was a quarterback in the Canadian Football League (CFL). He played college football for the Iowa Hawkeyes, winning the Davey O'Brien Award in 2002.

== Early life ==
Banks attended Glades Central High School where he was a First-team All-Conference and All-State selection as a junior and senior. He was also a team captain all three years. He helped Belle Glade Glades Central win the state high school championship as a senior. He was a three-time football letterman and lettered twice in track.

== College career ==
=== Central Florida ===
Banks originally attended the University of Central Florida but transferred after his red-shirt freshman year.

=== Hinds CC ===
Banks transferred to Hinds Community College where he played Wide receiver as a JUCO freshman. He played quarterback as a sophomore and helped lead the team to an 11–1 record. Hinds was ranked as high as #4 nationally. Hinds won the State Junior College title his sophomore season as he passed for 2,192 yards (third in school history for passing yards in a single season) and rushed for 343 yards while recording 13 rushing touchdowns. He also passed for 16 touchdowns as a sophomore. After two seasons at Hinds, he transferred to the University of Iowa.

Banks was later named to the school's Team of the Decade.

=== Iowa ===
Banks played in 10 games in 2001 and was 41-of-68 (60.3%) for 582 yards, four touchdowns and two interceptions. He also carried the ball 41 times for 151 yards and two touchdowns. Then as a senior in 2002, his first career start came in the season-opener against Akron and he started all 13 games during the season. For the season he completed 170-of-294 (57.8%) for 2,573 yards, 26 touchdowns and seven interceptions. He helped lead the Hawkeyes to an 11–2 record and a tie for the conference championship with Ohio State. Had Iowa not lost to Iowa State they would have been undefeated in regular season and may have been selected to play in the Fiesta Bowl for the BCS championship. The Hawkeyes finished the season #8 in the AP Poll. Also, he was the runner-up for the Heisman Trophy. He won the Davey O'Brien Award as the nation's best Quarterback. He was named AP College Football Player of the Year, Walter Camp Foundation First-team All-America, Second-team All-America by the AP, Second-team All-America by The Sporting News, Second-team All-America by CNNSI.com. He also earned the Chicago Tribune Silver Football Award as the Big Ten Conference's Most Valuable Player. He was named the Big Ten Conference Offensive Player of the Year, one of three finalists for Maxwell Award, one of 10 finalists for Walter Camp Foundation Player of the Year, First-team All-Conference, a permanent team captain on offense, Co-Offensive MVP, Hayden Fry "Extra Heartbeat" Award winner. He was also selected to play in East/West Shrine Game and Hula Bowl.

== Professional career ==
Pre-draft measurables
Height	Weight	Arm length	Hand span	40-yard dash	Vertical jump	Broad jump	Wonderlic
5 ft 10 3/4 in (1.80 m)	201 lb (91 kg)	30 3/8 in (0.77 m)	9 1/8 in (0.23 m)	4.67 s	33.5 in (0.85 m)	9 ft 4 in (2.84 m)	13
All values from NFL Combine

=== Washington Redskins ===
Banks went unselected in the 2003 NFL draft. He signed with the Washington Redskins after the draft, but was released shortly afterwards.

=== Ottawa Renegades ===
In 2004, Banks signed with the Ottawa Renegades of the Canadian Football League (CFL).

=== Winnipeg Blue Bombers ===
In 2005 was selected by the Winnipeg Blue Bombers in Ottawa's Player dispersal draft. Then on May 16, 2007, he, along with fellow quarterback Matt Bohnet re-signed with the Blue Bombers.

=== Montreal Alouettes ===
In June 2007, Banks was traded to the Montreal Alouettes in exchange for quarterback Kliff Kingsbury.

=== Berlin Adler ===
In 2009, Banks signed with the Berlin Adler of the German Football League (GFL).

=== Iowa Barnstormers ===
On January 31, 2011, Banks was assigned to the Iowa Barnstormers of Arena Football League (AFL). On April 1, 2011, Banks set a Barnstormers single game record in touchdowns with an 11 TD (10 passing, 1 rushing) performance against the San Jose SaberCats at the HP Pavilion. Iowa won 76–69.

== Career statistics ==
=== College ===
Season	Comp. %	Pass yards	TDs	INTs	Rush yards	Rush TDs
2000	--	2,192	16	--	343	13
2001	60.3%	582	4	2	160	2
2002	57.8%	2,573	26	5	423	5

=== CFL ===
Season	Atts.	Comps.	Comp. %	Pass Yards	TDs	INTs	Rating	Rush yards	Rush TDs
2004	106	67	63.2%	849	7	2	102.3	138	2
2005	14	5	35.7%	54	1	1	45.0	3	0
2006	52	22	42.3%	219	1	3	37.3	36	0
2007	6	3	50.0%	55	0	2	42.4	5	0
2008	1	1	100.0%	8	0	0	118.8	20	0
Total	179	98	54.7%	1,195	9	8	73.7	204	2

=== AFL ===
Year	Team	Passing							Rushing		
Year	Team	Comp	ATT	%	YDS	TD	INT	Rate	ATT	YDS	TD
2011	Iowa Barnstormers	321	515	62.3	3,973	82	24	106.3	70	257	11

== Personal life ==
Banks is a cousin of former Tennessee, College of the Sequoias, Ole Miss and Central Valley Coyotes quarterback Brent Schaeffer. He is also a cousin of wide receiver Anquan Boldin and basketball player Cayden Daughtry.
