= 2001 Penn State Nittany Lions football team =

American college football season

2001 Penn State Nittany Lions football
- Conference: Big Ten Conference
- Record: 5–6 (4–4 Big Ten)
- Head coach: Joe Paterno (36th season)
- Offensive coordinator: Fran Ganter (18th season)
- Offensive scheme: Pro-style
- Defensive coordinator: Tom Bradley (2nd season)
- Base defense: 4–3
- Home stadium: Beaver Stadium

2001 Big Ten Conference football standings
	Conf.			Overall
Team	W		L	W		L
No. 12 Illinois $	7	–	1	10	–	2
No. 20 Michigan	6	–	2	8	–	4
Ohio State	5	–	3	7	–	5
Iowa	4	–	4	7	–	5
Purdue	4	–	4	6	–	6
Penn State	4	–	4	5	–	6
Indiana	4	–	4	5	–	6
Michigan State	3	–	5	7	–	5
Wisconsin	3	–	5	5	–	7
Minnesota	2	–	6	4	–	7
Northwestern	2	–	6	4	–	7
$ – BCS representative as conference champion; Rankings from AP Poll

The 2001 Penn State Nittany Lions football team represented the Pennsylvania State University in the 2001 NCAA Division I-A football season. The team's head coach was Joe Paterno. It played its home games at Beaver Stadium in University Park, Pennsylvania.

== Schedule ==
Due to the September 11 attacks, the Virginia game was postponed from September 13 to December 1.

Date	Time	Opponent	Site	TV	Result	Attendance	Source
September 1	8:00 p.m.	No. 2 Miami (FL)*	Beaver Stadium; University Park, PA	ABC	L 7–33	109,313	
September 22	12:00 p.m.	Wisconsin	Beaver Stadium; University Park, PA	ABC	L 6–18	107,253	
September 29	12:00 p.m.	at Iowa	Kinnick Stadium; Iowa City, IA	ESPN	L 18–24	69,422	
October 6	3:30 p.m.	No. 15 Michigan	Beaver Stadium; University Park, PA (rivalry)	ABC	L 0–20	107,879	
October 20	3:30 p.m.	at No. 22 Northwestern	Ryan Field; Evanston, IL	ABC	W 38–35	42,512	
October 27	12:00 p.m.	Ohio State	Beaver Stadium; University Park, PA (rivalry)	ESPN	W 29–27	108,327	
November 3	12:00 p.m.	Southern Miss*^{†}	Beaver Stadium; University Park, PA	ESPN2	W 38–20	106,158	
November 10	3:30 p.m.	at No. 15 Illinois	Memorial Stadium; Champaign, IL	ABC	L 28–33	70,904	
November 17	12:00 p.m.	Indiana	Beaver Stadium; University Park, PA	ESPN Plus	W 28–14	106,527	
November 24	3:30 p.m.	at Michigan State	Spartan Stadium; East Lansing, MI (rivalry)	ESPN	W 42–37	72,658	
December 1	12:00 p.m.	at Virginia*	Scott Stadium; Charlottesville, VA	ESPN	L 14–20	57,005	
*Non-conference game; ^{†}Homecoming; Rankings from AP Poll released prior to the game; All times are in Eastern time

== Roster ==
2001 Penn State Nittany Lions football team roster
Players
Coaches
Offense

Pos.	#	Name	Class
QB	3	Chris Ganter	Fr
QB	4	Matt Senneca	Jr
RB	5	Larry Johnson	Jr
TE	6	R. J. Luke	Jr
QB	7	Zack Mills	Fr
RB	8	Eric McCoo	Sr
WR	11	Tony Johnson	So
QB	12	Michael Robinson	Fr
WR	13	Kinta Palmer	Fr
WR	17	Terrance Phillips	Fr
WR	19	Gerald Smith	Fr
WR	20	Eddie Drummond	Sr
RB	22	Pete Gilmore	Fr
WR	24	Bryant Johnson	Jr
RB	30	Anthony Butler	Fr
WR	28	Anwar Phillips	Fr
WR	31	Ernie Terrell	Fr
FB	31	Terrence Glover	So
FB	33	Mike Lukac	So
RB	34	Omar Easy	Sr
RB	35	Aric Heffelfinger	Fr
WR	36	Mike Drenning	Fr
FB	39	Paul Jefferson	So
FB	42	Mick Blosser	Sr
RB	44	Ricky Upton	So
RB	45	Adam Senk	Fr
WR	48	Munya Maraire	Jr
G	50	Tyler Lenda	Jr
OL	52	Brian Fairchild	Fr
OL	53	Tommy McHugh	Fr
G	54	Scott Davis	Fr
G	55	Greg Ransom	Sr
C	56	Geoff Stryker	Sr
OL	57	Carl Hunt	Fr
C	59	Eric Rickenbach	Jr
C	61	David Costlow	So
OL	62	Nick Daise	Fr
C	63	Joe Iorio	Jr
OT	64	Matt Schmitt	Sr
G	66	B. J. Evangelista	Fr
G	67	Jonathan Nabavi	So
OT	70	Nick Marmo	Fr
G	71	Joe Hartings	Sr
OT	72	Gus Felder	Sr
OL	74	Tyler Reed	Fr
OT	75	Chris McKelvy	So
OT	76	Damone Jones	So
OL	77	E.Z. Smith	Fr
WR	80	Scott Shirley	So
WR	81	Jason Stryker	Fr
FB	82	Sean McHugh	So
WR	83	Ryan Scott	Fr
WR	84	Steve Delich	Jr
TE	85	John Gilmore	Sr
WR	88	Matt Kranchick	So
TE	89	Andrew Richardson	Fr
TE	90	Isaac Smolko	Fr
TE	91	Mike Pawlikowski	Fr
TE	93	Casey Williams	So

Defense

Pos.	#	Name	Class
CB	1	Bruce Branch	Sr
LB	2	Deryck Toles	So
DE	3	Ron Graham	Sr
S	9	Sam Crenshaw	Sr
LB	10	Jesse Neumeyer	Fr
CB	13	Scott Sanden	Fr
S	15	Yaacov Yisrael	So
LB	16	Andy Ryland	So
DB	18	Andrew Guman	Fr
LB	21	Shamar Finney	Sr
S	23	Shawn Mayer	Jr
CB	25	Rich Gardner	So
DB	26	Nolan McCready	Fr
DB	27	Chris Harrell	Fr
LB	28	Erik Holt	Jr
S	28	James Millon	Jr
DB	29	Paul Cronin	Fr
LB	29	Ryan Pinckney	Jr
DL	70	Michael Butler	Fr
CB	32	Bryan Scott	Jr
LB	35	Dave Benfatti	Sr
DB	36	Alan Zemaitis	Fr
LB	37	LaMar Stewart	Fr
S	38	Jimi Mitchell	Fr
LB	40	T.C. Cosby	Fr
LB	41	Tom Williams	Sr
DB	43	Adam Taliaferro	So
DB	44	Marcus Mills	Fr
CB	45	Tom Humphrey	Sr
DB	46	Geo Vendemia	Fr
LB	47	Gino Capone	So
DB	48	Ben Lago	So
LB	49	Dave Jens	So
LB	51	Tim Johnson	Fr
DE	53	Jason Crosby	Fr
LB	58	Dethrell Garcia	Fr
DL	59	Charles Rush	Fr
DT	60	Tyler Valoczki	Jr
LB	94	Israel Paniagua	Jr
DT	62	Randy Buck	Jr
LB	65	Sam Ruhe	So
DT	69	Jason Robinson	Fr
DT	73	Jimmy Kennedy	Jr
DT	78	Erik Noll	Fr
DE	80	Scott Paxson	Fr
DE	81	Michael Haynes	Jr
DE	84	Matthew Rice	Fr
DE	86	Jeremiah Davis	Fr
DE	87	John Bronson	Fr
DE	92	Lavon Chisley	Fr
DE	92	T. J. Gholston	Jr
LB	94	Derek Wake	So
DE	96	Bob Jones	Sr
DL	97	Greg Bauer	Fr
DT	98	Anthony Adams	Jr
DT	99	Tim Falls	Jr

Special teams

Pos.	#	Name	Class
P	14	David Royer	Jr
K	16	Robbie Gould	Fr
K	19	Mike Savage	So
K	33	Matt Huet	Fr
P	39	Woody Schmidt	Fr
K	95	David Kimball	So

Head coach

- Joe Paterno

Coordinators/assistant coaches

Legend

- (C) Team captain
- (S) Suspended
- (I) Ineligible
- Injured
- Redshirt

Roster
Last update: December 11, 2001

== NFL draft ==
Two Nittany Lions were drafted in the 2002 NFL draft.

Round	Pick	Overall	Name	Position	Team
4th	9	107	Omar Easy	Fullback	Kansas City Chiefs
6th	24	196	John Gilmore	Tight end	New Orleans Saints
