= 2002 Penn State Nittany Lions football team =

American college football season

2002 Penn State Nittany Lions football

Capital One Bowl, L 9–13 vs. Auburn
- Conference: Big Ten Conference

Ranking
- Coaches: No. 15
- AP: No. 16
- Record: 9–4 (5–3 Big Ten)
- Head coach: Joe Paterno (37th season)
- Offensive coordinator: Fran Ganter (19th season)
- Offensive scheme: Pro-style
- Defensive coordinator: Tom Bradley (3rd season)
- Base defense: 4–3
- Home stadium: Beaver Stadium

2002 Big Ten Conference football standings
| | Conf. | | | Overall |
| Team | W | | L | W | | L |
|---|---|---|---|---|---|---|
| No. 1 Ohio State $#+ | 8 | – | 0 | 14 | – | 0 |
| No. 8 Iowa %+ | 8 | – | 0 | 11 | – | 2 |
| No. 9 Michigan | 6 | – | 2 | 10 | – | 3 |
| No. 16 Penn State | 5 | – | 3 | 9 | – | 4 |
| Purdue | 4 | – | 4 | 7 | – | 6 |
| Illinois | 4 | – | 4 | 5 | – | 7 |
| Minnesota | 3 | – | 5 | 8 | – | 5 |
| Wisconsin | 2 | – | 6 | 8 | – | 6 |
| Michigan State | 2 | – | 6 | 4 | – | 8 |
| Northwestern | 1 | – | 7 | 3 | – | 9 |
| Indiana | 1 | – | 7 | 3 | – | 9 |
# – BCS National Champion; $ – BCS representative as conference champion; % – BCS at-large representative; + – Conference co-champions; Rankings from AP Poll

The 2002 Penn State Nittany Lions football team represented the Pennsylvania State University in the 2002 NCAA Division I-A football season. The team's head coach was Joe Paterno. It played its home games at Beaver Stadium in University Park, Pennsylvania.

== Preseason ==
The Nittany Lions returned 16 starters from the previous season, who won five of its final seven games. Six starters returned on defense, led by defensive tackle Jimmy Kennedy, who returned for his fifth year despite speculations he would enter the NFL draft.

The offensive unit averted a possible quarterback controversy when last year's starter Matt Senneca announced that he would not be returning for his final year of eligibility. Redshirt sophomore Zack Mills would lead the offense, with expectations high after showing flashes of brilliance coming off the bench in 2001. Larry Johnson would also become the featured back, after spending three seasons playing in a tailback-by-committee that had inconsistent production. Johnson will have the luxury of running behind an offensive line that returned all five starters.

Penn State was ranked number 24 in both the AP and Coaches college football preseason polls.

=== Recruiting class ===
College recruiting
| Name | Hometown | School | Height | Weight | 40^{‡} | Commit date |
|---|---|---|---|---|---|---|
| Jay Alford; DT | Orange, NJ | Orange HS | 6 ft 3 in (1.91 m) | 270 lb (120 kg) | 4.80 | NA |
| Jay Alford; DT | Recruit ratings: Scout: Rivals: | | | | | |
| Chris Auletta; OL | Melville, NY | St. Anthony's HS | 6 ft 6 in (1.98 m) | 300 lb (140 kg) | 5.30 | NA |
| Chris Auletta; OL | Recruit ratings: Scout: Rivals: | | | | | |
| Brian Borgoyn; OL | Pittsburgh, PA | Woodland Hills SHS | 6 ft 5 in (1.96 m) | 290 lb (130 kg) | NA | NA |
| Brian Borgoyn; OL | Recruit ratings: Scout: Rivals: | | | | | |
| Levi Brown; DT | Norfolk, VA | Granby HS | 6 ft 5 in (1.96 m) | 290 lb (130 kg) | 5.00 | Dec 19, 2001 |
| Levi Brown; DT | Recruit ratings: Scout: Rivals: | | | | | |
| Mark Farris; OL | Pittsburgh, PA | North Hills SHS | 6 ft 6 in (1.98 m) | 285 lb (129 kg) | 5.00 | Jan 23, 2002 |
| Mark Farris; OL | Recruit ratings: Scout: Rivals: | | | | | |
| Vince Gliatta; DB | Canton, OH | Canton Central Catholic HS | 6 ft 1 in (1.85 m) | 190 lb (86 kg) | 4.50 | NA |
| Vince Gliatta; DB | Recruit ratings: Rivals: | | | | | |
| Tamba Hali; DE | Teaneck, NJ | Teaneck HS | 6 ft 3 in (1.91 m) | 240 lb (110 kg) | 4.70 | Jan 27, 2002 |
| Tamba Hali; DE | Recruit ratings: Scout: Rivals: | | | | | |
| Patrick Hall; RB | Canton, GA | Sequoyah HS | 6 ft 3 in (1.91 m) | 230 lb (100 kg) | NA | Jan 13, 2002 |
| Patrick Hall; RB | Recruit ratings: Scout: Rivals: | | | | | |
| Josh Hannum; WR | Wallingford, PA | Strath Haven HS | 6 ft 0 in (1.83 m) | 170 lb (77 kg) | 4.20 | NA |
| Josh Hannum; WR | Recruit ratings: Scout: Rivals: | | | | | |
| Maurice Humphrey; CB | Berlin, CT | Berlin HS | 6 ft 0 in (1.83 m) | 185 lb (84 kg) | 4.40 | Nov 26, 2001 |
| Maurice Humphrey; CB | Recruit ratings: Scout: Rivals: | | | | | |
| Donnie Johnson; RB | Cincinnati, OH | North College Hill HS | 5 ft 11 in (1.80 m) | 195 lb (88 kg) | 4.40 | Dec 21, 2001 |
| Donnie Johnson; RB | Recruit ratings: Scout: Rivals: | | | | | |
| Ed Johnson; DE | Detroit, MI | Crockett Vocational Tech | 6 ft 3 in (1.91 m) | 255 lb (116 kg) | 4.70 | NA |
| Ed Johnson; DE | Recruit ratings: Scout: Rivals: | | | | | |
| Jim Kanuch; S | Johnstown, PA | Westmont Hilltop HS | 6 ft 1 in (1.85 m) | 190 lb (86 kg) | 4.43 | NA |
| Jim Kanuch; S | Recruit ratings: Scout: Rivals: | | | | | |
| Jeremy Kapinos; P | Springfield, VA | West Springfield HS | 6 ft 1 in (1.85 m) | 220 lb (100 kg) | 4.90 | Dec 11, 2001 |
| Jeremy Kapinos; P | Recruit ratings: Scout: Rivals: | | | | | |
| Lee Lispi; OL | Pittston, PA | Pittston Area SHS | 6 ft 6 in (1.98 m) | 295 lb (134 kg) | 5.10 | NA |
| Lee Lispi; OL | Recruit ratings: Scout: Rivals: | | | | | |
| Calvin Lowry; CB | Fayetteville, NC | Douglas Byrd HS | 6 ft 0 in (1.83 m) | 185 lb (84 kg) | 4.40 | NA |
| Calvin Lowry; CB | Recruit ratings: Scout: Rivals: | | | | | |
| Robert Price; OL | Shaker Heights, OH | Shaker Heights HS | 6 ft 3 in (1.91 m) | 295 lb (134 kg) | 5.20 | NA |
| Robert Price; OL | Recruit ratings: Scout: Rivals: | | | | | |
| Steve Roach; OL | Martinsburg, WV | Martinsburg Senior HS | 6 ft 2 in (1.88 m) | 305 lb (138 kg) | 5.20 | NA |
| Steve Roach; OL | Recruit ratings: Scout: Rivals: | | | | | |
| Tim Shaw; RB | Livonia, MI | Clarenceville HS | 6 ft 2 in (1.88 m) | 217 lb (98 kg) | 4.44 | Jan 28, 2002 |
| Tim Shaw; RB | Recruit ratings: Scout: Rivals: | | | | | |
| BranDon Snow; LB | Newark, DE | Newark HS | 6 ft 2 in (1.88 m) | 225 lb (102 kg) | 4.47 | Feb 6, 2002 |
| BranDon Snow; LB | Recruit ratings: Scout: Rivals: | | | | | |
| Chris Wilson; RB | Baltimore, MD | Catonsville HS | 6 ft 2 in (1.88 m) | 245 lb (111 kg) | 4.60 | NA |
| Chris Wilson; RB | Recruit ratings: Scout: Rivals: | | | | | |
| J.R. Zwierzynski; RB | Joliet, IL | Joliet Catholic Academy | 6 ft 2.5 in (1.89 m) | 220 lb (100 kg) | 4.50 | Jan 18, 2002 |
| J.R. Zwierzynski; RB | Recruit ratings: Scout: Rivals: | | | | | |
Overall recruit ranking: Scout: 16 Rivals: 21
‡ Refers to 40-yard dash; Note: In many cases, Scout, Rivals, 247Sports, On3, and ESPN may conflict in their listings of height, weight and 40 time.; In these cases, the average was taken. ESPN grades are on a 100-point scale.; Sources: "Penn State Commit List for 2002". Rivals.; "Scout.com Football Recruiting: Penn State". Scout.; "Scout.com Team Recruiting Rankings". Scout.; "2002 Team Ranking". Rivals.com.

=== Pre-season awards ===
- Jimmy Kennedy

Playboy pre-season All-American
Second-team Athlon Sports pre-season All-American
Second-team Lindy's pre-season All-American

- Zack Mills

Lindy's pre-season Big Ten Most Valuable Player

== Schedule ==
| Date | Time | Opponent | Rank | Site | TV | Result | Attendance |
|---|---|---|---|---|---|---|---|
| August 31 | 12:00 p.m. | UCF* | No. 24 | Beaver Stadium; University Park, PA | ESPN | W 27–24 | 103,029 |
| September 14 | 8:00 p.m. | No. 8 Nebraska* | | Beaver Stadium; University Park, PA | ABC | W 40–7 | 110,753 |
| September 21 | 12:00 p.m. | Louisiana Tech* | No. 15 | Beaver Stadium; University Park, PA | ESPN Plus | W 49–17 | 103,987 |
| September 28 | 12:00 p.m. | Iowa | No. 12 | Beaver Stadium; University Park, PA | ESPN | L 35–42 ^{OT} | 108,247 |
| October 5 | 3:30 p.m. | at No. 19 Wisconsin | No. 20 | Camp Randall Stadium; Madison, WI | ABC | W 34–31 | 79,403 |
| October 12 | 3:30 p.m. | at No. 13 Michigan | No. 15 | Michigan Stadium; Ann Arbor, MI (rivalry) | ABC | L 24–27 ^{OT} | 111,502 |
| October 19 | 12:00 p.m. | Northwestern^{†} | No. 20 | Beaver Stadium; University Park, PA | ESPN2 | W 49–0 | 108,853 |
| October 26 | 3:30 p.m. | at No. 4 Ohio State | No. 18 | Ohio Stadium; Columbus, OH (rivalry) | ABC | L 7–13 | 105,103 |
| November 2 | 3:30 p.m. | Illinois | No. 20 | Beaver Stadium; University Park, PA | ESPN | W 18–7 | 105,589 |
| November 9 | 3:30 p.m. | Virginia* | No. 19 | Beaver Stadium; University Park, PA | ABC | W 35–14 | 108,698 |
| November 16 | 3:30 p.m. | at Indiana | No. 16 | Memorial Stadium; Bloomington, IN | ESPN2 | W 58–25 | 27,454 |
| November 23 | 3:30 p.m. | Michigan State | No. 15 | Beaver Stadium; University Park, PA (rivalry) | ABC | W 61–7 | 108,755 |
| January 1, 2003 | 1:00 p.m. | vs. No. 19 Auburn* | No. 10 | Florida Citrus Bowl; Orlando, FL (Capital One Bowl) | ABC | L 9–13 | 66,334 |
*Non-conference game; ^{†}Homecoming; Rankings from AP Poll released prior to the game; All times are in Eastern time

== Roster ==
2002 Penn State Nittany Lions football team roster
Players
Coaches
Offense

| Pos. | # | Name | Class |
|---|---|---|---|
| WR | 2 | Josh Hannum | Fr |
| QB | 3 | Chris Ganter | Fr |
| RB | 5 | Larry Johnson | Sr |
| WR | 6 | Donnie Johnson | Fr |
| QB | 7 | Zack Mills | So |
| WR | 9 | Terrance Phillips | Fr |
| WR | 11 | Tony Johnson | Jr |
| QB | 12 | Michael Robinson | Fr |
| WR | 13 | Kinta Palmer | Fr |
| RB | 13 | Reginald Walker | So |
| QB | 14 | Andy Kubic | Fr |
| WR | 15 | Kevin Darling | Fr |
| QB | 16 | Dan Corrado | Fr |
| QB | 17 | Greg Hennigar | Fr |
| QB | 19 | Tom Lundquist | Fr |
| WR | 19 | Gerald Smith | So |
| RB | 20 | Tim Shaw | Fr |
| WR | 22 | Pete Gilmore | So |
| RB | 23 | Aric Heffelfinger | Fr |
| WR | 24 | Bryant Johnson | Sr |
| RB | 26 | Mike Gasparato | So |
| RB | 30 | BranDon Snow | Fr |
| WR | 31 | Ernie Terrell | Fr |
| RB | 32 | Chris Wilson | Fr |
| TE | 33 | Mike Lukac | Jr |
| FB | 36 | Brian Fairchild | Fr |
| FB | 39 | Paul Jefferson | Jr |
| FB | 42 | Sean McHugh | Jr |
| RB | 44 | Ricky Upton | Jr |
| FB | 45 | Adam Senk | Fr |
| WR | 46 | Zachery Moran | Fr |
| G | 50 | Tyler Lenda | Sr |
| OL | 52 | Blase Iorio | Fr |
| G | 54 | Scott Davis | So |
| OL | 56 | Tommy McHugh | Fr |
| OL | 59 | Eric Rickenbach | Sr |
| C | 60 | Robert Price | Fr |
| C | 61 | David Costlow | Jr |
| OL | 62 | Nick Daise | Fr |
| C | 63 | Joe Iorio | Sr |
| OT | 64 | Matt Schmitt | Sr |
| OL | 66 | Lance Antolick | Fr |
| G | 67 | Jonathan Nabavi | Jr |
| OT | 68 | John Wilson | Fr |
| C | 70 | Nick Marmo | So |
| G | 71 | Mark Farris | Fr |
| OT | 72 | Gus Felder | Sr |
| G | 74 | Tyler Reed | Fr |
| OT | 75 | Chris McKelvy | Jr |
| OT | 76 | Damone Jones | Jr |
| G | 77 | E.Z. Smith | Fr |
| OL | 78 | Brian Borgoyn | Fr |
| OL | 79 | Shawn Campbell | Sr |
| WR | 80 | Scott Shirley | Jr |
| WR | 81 | Jason Stryker | So |
| WR | 82 | Vic Surma | Fr |
| WR | 83 | Ryan Scott | So |
| WR | 84 | Steve Delich | Sr |
| TE | 85 | Isaac Smolko | Fr |
| TE | 88 | Matt Kranchick | Jr |
| TE | 89 | Andrew Richardson | Fr |
| TE | 91 | Mike Pawlikowski | So |
| TE | 93 | Casey Williams | Jr |

Defense

| Pos. | # | Name | Class |
|---|---|---|---|
| CB | 1 | Anwar Phillips | Fr |
| LB | 2 | Deryck Toles | Jr |
| S | 8 | Jesse Neumeyer | Fr |
| DB | 9 | Jim Kanuch | Fr |
| DB | 10 | Calvin Lowry | Fr |
| S | 15 | Yaacov Yisrael | Jr |
| LB | 16 | Andy Ryland | Jr |
| DE | 17 | Lavon Chisley | Fr |
| S | 18 | Andrew Guman | So |
| DB | 20 | Marcus Mills | Fr |
| CB | 21 | Alan Zemaitis | Fr |
| DB | 22 | Maurice Humphrey | Fr |
| S | 23 | Shawn Mayer | Sr |
| CB | 25 | Rich Gardner | Jr |
| DB | 26 | Nolan McCready | Fr |
| S | 27 | Chris Harrell | So |
| CB | 28 | James Millon | Sr |
| S | 29 | Paul Cronin | Fr |
| LB | 29 | Ryan Pinckney | Sr |
| CB | 30 | Eric Dare | Jr |
| CB | 32 | Bryan Scott | Sr |
| DB | 34 | Gio Vendemia | Fr |
| DB | 35 | John Royse | Fr |
| LB | 35 | J.R. Zwierzynski | Fr |
| LB | 37 | LaMar Stewart | So |
| LB | 38 | Jimi Mitchell | So |
| LB | 40 | T.C. Cosby | So |
| LB | 41 | Scott Paxson | Fr |
| DB | 43 | Adam Taliaferro | Jr |
| LB | 44 | Patrick Hall | Fr |
| LB | 45 | Pat Bedics | Fr |
| DB | 46 | Curt Reese | So |
| LB | 47 | Gino Capone | Jr |
| DB | 48 | Ben Lego | Jr |
| LB | 48 | Zack Pierce | Fr |
| LB | 51 | Tim Johnson | So |
| DL | 53 | Steve Roach | Fr |
| DE | 55 | Matthew Rice | Fr |
| DT | 57 | Charles Rush | Fr |
| LB | 58 | Dethrell Garcia | Fr |
| DT | 60 | Tyler Valoczki | Sr |
| DT | 62 | Randy Buck | Sr |
| LB | 65 | Sam Ruhe | Jr |
| DT | 69 | Jason Robinson | So |
| DT | 73 | Jimmy Kennedy | Sr |
| DE | 81 | Michael Haynes | Sr |
| DE | 86 | Jeremiah Davis | So |
| DE | 87 | John Bronson | So |
| DT | 90 | Levi Brown | Fr |
| DT | 91 | Tamba Hali | Fr |
| DL | 92 | Ed Johnson | Fr |
| LB | 94 | Derek Wake | So |
| DL | 95 | Mike Sothern | Fr |
| DL | 96 | Jay Alford | Fr |
| DE | 97 | Greg Bauer | Fr |
| DT | 98 | Anthony Adams | Sr |
| DT | 99 | Tim Falls | Sr |

Special teams

| Pos. | # | Name | Class |
|---|---|---|---|
| K | 4 | Robbie Gould | So |
| P | 14 | David Royer | Sr |
| K | 25 | Matt Huet | So |
| P | 36 | Jeremy Kapinos | Fr |
| K | 95 | David Kimball | Jr |

Head coach

- Joe Paterno

Coordinators/assistant coaches

Legend

- (C) Team captain
- (S) Suspended
- (I) Ineligible
- Injured
- Redshirt

Roster
Last update: October 12, 2002

== Game summaries ==
=== UCF ===
| | 1 | 2 | 3 | 4 | Total |
|---|---|---|---|---|---|
| UCF | 3 | 6 | 0 | 15 | 24 |
| Penn State | 10 | 0 | 10 | 7 | 27 |

After a sloppy first half, Penn State scored 17 unanswered points in the second half and then withstood a late charge to hold off the Golden Knights for a 27–24 win. Zack Mills was 13 of 20 for 194 yards with two touchdowns and no interceptions. On defense, Anthony Adams recovered a fumbled snap to set up a field goal, and Derek Wake blocked a field goal attempt. Trailing 27–9 in the fourth quarter, UCF got within three points with 24 seconds remaining but failed to recover the onside kick, and Penn State ran out the clock.

=== Nebraska ===
| | 1 | 2 | 3 | 4 | Total |
|---|---|---|---|---|---|
| Nebraska | 0 | 7 | 0 | 0 | 7 |
| Penn State | 0 | 13 | 20 | 7 | 40 |

In front of a crowd of 110,753, a new Beaver Stadium attendance record that stood intact for 15 years, (110,823 VS Michigan 2017) Penn State routed the Cornhuskers 40–7, as Larry Johnson and backup quarterback Michael Robinson each had two touchdown runs. Cornerback Rich Gardner had his first career interception and returned it 44 yards for a touchdown in the third quarter. It was Penn State's first victory over a top 10 team since 1999.

=== Louisiana Tech ===
| | 1 | 2 | 3 | 4 | Total |
|---|---|---|---|---|---|
| Louisiana Tech | 10 | 0 | 7 | 0 | 17 |
| Penn State | 14 | 7 | 28 | 0 | 49 |

Penn State beat the Bulldogs 49–17, despite Tech's quarterback Luke McCown throwing for more than 400 yards but also threw three interceptions and had a fumble lost. Larry Johnson ran for 147 yards on 17 carries and two touchdowns and also had a touchdown reception. Michael Robinson also had three rushing touchdowns.

=== Iowa ===
| | 1 | 2 | 3 | 4 | OT | Total |
|---|---|---|---|---|---|---|
| Iowa | 17 | 9 | 9 | 0 | 7 | 42 |
| Penn State | 0 | 7 | 6 | 22 | 0 | 35 |

After trailing the Hawkeyes by 22 points in the fourth quarter, Zack Mills threw for three touchdowns in the final 7:13 to tie the game 35–35 and force overtime, but the Nittany Lions were unable to score in overtime and lost 42–35. For the game, Mills completed 23 of 44 passes for a school record 399 yards and four touchdowns. The team finished with only 54 yards rushing, and Michael Robinson, who had five touchdowns in twelve carries in the past two games, was held to minus-2 yards on four carries.

But the play that was most shown repeatedly on sports highlights shows throughout the rest of the season happened after the game. Following a couple questionable calls by the line judge in overtime, Joe Paterno sprinted down the field to catch up with referee Dick Honig as he approached the tunnel and grabbed Honig by the back of the shirt to voice his displeasure with the way the game ended. Paterno was angered that Penn State wide receiver Tony Johnson caught a pass with both feet in bounds according to the stadium's video replay board, but the play was ruled an incompletion.

=== Wisconsin ===
| | 1 | 2 | 3 | 4 | Total |
|---|---|---|---|---|---|
| Penn State | 10 | 11 | 7 | 6 | 34 |
| Wisconsin | 0 | 14 | 6 | 11 | 31 |

Penn State scored on four of its first five possessions as the Lions beat the Badgers 34–31. Penn State scored on touchdowns from Zack Mills, Larry Johnson, and Sean McHugh and got four Robbie Gould field goals. Defensive tackle Jimmy Kennedy and defensive end Michael Haynes each had three sacks, as the Lions sacked Wisconsin quarterback Brooks Bollinger seven times. Wisconsin scored to close it to three points with 1:17 remaining, but Bryan Scott covered up the onside kick to seal the game.

=== Michigan ===
| | 1 | 2 | 3 | 4 | OT | Total |
|---|---|---|---|---|---|---|
| Penn State | 7 | 0 | 6 | 8 | 3 | 24 |
| Michigan | 0 | 7 | 0 | 14 | 6 | 27 |

The Wolverines beat Penn State 27–24 in overtime. A slow first half gave way to a shootout in the second half. The game was tied 7–7 at halftime, and the teams combined for only 240 yards. Penn State led 13–7 late in the third quarter and looked to seize control of the game after forcing a Michigan punt at their own 20, but a roughing the punter penalty kept the drive alive, and Michigan found the end zone eight plays later. Zack Mills finished the day 19 of 31 for 264 yards and two touchdowns.

Joe Paterno expressed his displeasure with the officials for the second time this season as he yelled at referee David Witvoet after regulation. There were a number of odd and questionable actions by the officials during the game, as pointed out by the TV commentators, including the roughing the punter penalty and the referee refusing to ask for measurements when it appeared Michigan had been stopped short of first down. Each time he glanced at the sideline and signaled first down. It was most noticeable in the third quarter when he signaled first down even as Michigan was lining up in short-yardage formation, thinking it was third-and-1.

But Paterno and the coaching staff were most livid about a blown call with 40 seconds remaining in regulation and the score tied at 21–21. Receiver Tony Johnson had just made a leaping catch of a Mills pass at the Michigan 22. The side judge ruled Johnson out of bounds despite replays showing he had both feet at least a yard inbounds. Numerous replays on TV showed the large divot in the field where Johnson's feet had landed. Instead of a field goal opportunity to win the game in regulation, the game was forced into overtime.

=== Northwestern ===
| | 1 | 2 | 3 | 4 | Total |
|---|---|---|---|---|---|
| Northwestern | 0 | 0 | 0 | 0 | 0 |
| Penn State | 7 | 28 | 7 | 7 | 49 |

Larry Johnson set Penn State's single-game rushing record as the Nittany Lions shut out the Wildcats 49–0. Johnson rushed for 257 yards on 23 carries and scored twice before sitting out the final 28 minutes. In all, twelve Penn State players carried the ball for a total of 423 yards. The defense recorded its first shutout since the 1999 Alamo Bowl, holding the Wildcats to 9 yards rushing and 202 total yards.

=== Ohio State ===
| | 1 | 2 | 3 | 4 | Total |
|---|---|---|---|---|---|
| Penn State | 7 | 0 | 0 | 0 | 7 |
| Ohio State | 0 | 3 | 10 | 0 | 13 |

The Buckeyes defense held Zack Mills to only 98 yards passing and intercepted three passes, including one by Chris Gamble returned for a touchdown, to beat the Nittany Lions 13–7. Penn State was held to only 179 yards of offense and eight first downs, fewest under Joe Paterno. Despite this, Penn State led 7–3 at halftime and very nearly won the game at the end.

=== Illinois ===
| | 1 | 2 | 3 | 4 | Total |
|---|---|---|---|---|---|
| Illinois | 0 | 0 | 0 | 7 | 7 |
| Penn State | 9 | 9 | 0 | 0 | 18 |

Larry Johnson set the school record for rushing yards in a game, beating his own record from two weeks prior, as the Nittany Lions beat the Fighting Illini 18–7. Johnson rushed for 279 yards on 31 carries, including an 84-yard touchdown run. The Penn State defense went 11-plus quarters without allowing a touchdown before Illinois scored with 5:22 remaining.

=== Virginia ===
| | 1 | 2 | 3 | 4 | Total |
|---|---|---|---|---|---|
| Virginia | 7 | 0 | 0 | 7 | 14 |
| Penn State | 7 | 3 | 10 | 15 | 35 |

The defense held the Cavaliers to only 30 yards rushing as Penn State won 35–14. Zack Mills was 19 of 30 for 227 yards and two touchdowns. The Lions had 289 yards on the ground, including 118 yards on 31 carries and a touchdown by Larry Johnson. Backup quarterback and holder Chris Ganter also scored on a 30-yard run off of a fake field goal.

=== Indiana ===
| | 1 | 2 | 3 | 4 | Total |
|---|---|---|---|---|---|
| Penn State | 14 | 14 | 10 | 20 | 58 |
| Indiana | 12 | 6 | 0 | 7 | 25 |

Larry Johnson broke two school records as Penn State beat the Hoosiers 58–25. For the third time in five weeks, Johnson set the school's single-game rushing record with 327 yards on 28 carries. Johnson also broke Penn State's single-season rushing record with a total of 1,736 yards with two games left to play.

=== Michigan State ===
| | 1 | 2 | 3 | 4 | Total |
|---|---|---|---|---|---|
| Michigan State | 0 | 0 | 7 | 0 | 7 |
| Penn State | 14 | 34 | 7 | 6 | 61 |

Larry Johnson became the ninth player in NCAA history to rush for 2,000 yards in a season as Penn State blew out the Spartans 61–7. Johnson finished the day with 279 yards and four touchdowns, all in the first half. Bryant Johnson also scored on an 81-yard punt return and a 41-yard touchdown reception. Penn State had 400 yards of offense at halftime and finished with 536 total yards, including 422 yards rushing.

=== 2003 Capital One Bowl – Auburn ===
| | 1 | 2 | 3 | 4 | Total |
|---|---|---|---|---|---|
| Auburn | 0 | 0 | 7 | 6 | 13 |
| Penn State | 3 | 3 | 0 | 3 | 9 |

The Auburn Tigers rushed for 200 yards, controlled the clock, and outscored the Lions 13–3 in the second half to upset the Nittany Lions 13–9 in the Capital One Bowl. Larry Johnson finished with only 72 yards on 20 carries. Zack Mills was also ineffective, going 8 of 24 for 67 yards and an interception. He was pulled for a couple drives in the third quarter, and backup quarterback Michael Robinson led to the Lions for a field goal to go up 9–7.

== Rankings ==
Ranking movements Legend: ██ Increase in ranking ██ Decrease in ranking — = Not ranked
| | Week | | | | | | | | | | | | | | | | | |
| Poll | Pre | 1 | 2 | 3 | 4 | 5 | 6 | 7 | 8 | 9 | 10 | 11 | 12 | 13 | 14 | 15 | 16 | Final |
|---|---|---|---|---|---|---|---|---|---|---|---|---|---|---|---|---|---|---|
| AP | 24 | 24 | — | — | 15 | 12 | 20 | 15 | 20 | 18 | 20 | 19 | 16 | 15 | 11 | 10 | 10 | 16 |
| Coaches | 24 | 23 | 25 | 25 | 15 | 12 | 21 | 17 | 21 | 17 | 21 | 19 | 16 | 16 | 12 | 10 | 10 | 15 |
| BCS | Not released | | | | | | | | | — | — | — | 15 | 15 | 14 | 13 | 12 | Not released |

== Awards ==
=== Watchlists ===
- Michael Haynes
  Ted Hendricks Award semifinalist and finalist
- Bryant Johnson
  Fred Biletnikoff Award watchlist
- Larry Johnson
  Doak Walker Award watchlist, semifinalist and finalist
  Maxwell Award finalist
  Walter Camp Player of the Year finalist
- Jimmy Kennedy
  Bronko Nagurski Trophy watchlist
  Rotary Lombardi Award watchlist and semifinalist
  Outland Trophy watchlist
- Zack Mills
  Davey O'Brien Award watchlist and semifinalist
- Bryan Scott
  Jim Thorpe Award watchlist

=== Players ===
- Gino Capone
  Second-team All-Big Ten (conference media selection)
  First-team Verizon CoSIDA Academic All-District
- Rich Gardner
  Big Ten Defensive Player of the Week (September 14)
- Robbie Gould
  Big Ten Specialist of the Week (October 5)
- Andrew Guman
  Second-team Verizon CoSIDA Academic All-District
- Michael Haynes
  Second-team Associated Press All-American
  CNNSI.com All-American
  FWAA All-American
  Big Ten Defensive Player of the Year
  First-team All-Big Ten
  Big Ten Defensive Player of the Week (September 21)
  CNNSI.com mid-season first-team All-American
- Joe Iorio
  First-team Verizon CoSIDA Academic All-American
  First-team Verizon CoSIDA Academic All-District
- Bryant Johnson
  First-team All-Big Ten (conference coaches selection)
- Larry Johnson
  2002 Doak Walker Award winner
  2002 Maxwell Award winner
  AFCA All-American
  First-team Associated Press All-American
  Chevrolet Offensive Player of the Year
  FWAA All-American
  CNNSI.com All-American
  Walter Camp Player of the Year
  First-team Walter Camp All-American
  First-team All-Big Ten
  Big Ten Offensive Player of the Week (October 19)
  Big Ten Offensive Player of the Week (November 2)
  Big Ten Offensive Player of the Week (November 16)
  ESPN.com Player of the Week (November 16)
  Sporting News Player of the Week (November 16)
  USA Today Player of the Week (November 16)
  Big Ten Offensive Player of the Week (November 23)
  Most Valuable Player, 2003 Senior Bowl
- Jimmy Kennedy
  Third-team Associated Press All-American
  First-team Walter Camp All-American
  Big Ten Defensive Lineman of the Year
  First-team All-Big Ten
  Big Ten Defensive Player of the Week (October 5)
- Shawn Mayer
  Second-team All-Big Ten
  Big Ten Defensive Player of the Week (October 26)
- Zack Mills
  Big Ten Offensive Player of the Week (September 28)
- Matt Schmitt
  First-team Verizon CoSIDA Academic All-District

== Postseason ==
Penn State finished the season ranked #16 in the final AP college football poll and #15 in the final Coaches college football poll, earning Penn State its 25th Top 15 finish under Joe Paterno.

Tailback Larry Johnson would finish the season as the first Nittany Lion to lead the nation in rushing and all-purpose yardage. Johnson become the ninth player in Division I-A history to gain 2,000 yards rushing in the regular season, finishing third in Heisman Trophy balloting.

Penn State claimed second place in football attendance for the second consecutive season, averaging 107,239 through eight home games, ranking in the top four for the 12th consecutive year. The Nittany Lions also broke the NCAA record for total season attendance with 1,247,707 during the 13-game schedule, including a Beaver Stadium record of 110,753 for the Nebraska game.

=== NFL draft ===
A school record six seniors would be drafted in the first two rounds of the 2003 NFL draft, including another school record four players in the first round.

| Round | Pick | Overall | Name | Position | Team |
|---|---|---|---|---|---|
| 1st | 12 | 12 | Jimmy Kennedy | Defensive tackle | St. Louis Rams |
| 1st | 14 | 14 | Michael Haynes | Defensive end | Chicago Bears |
| 1st | 17 | 17 | Bryant Johnson | Wide receiver | Arizona Cardinals |
| 1st | 27 | 27 | Larry Johnson | Running back | Kansas City Chiefs |
| 2nd | 23 | 55 | Bryan Scott | Free safety | Atlanta Falcons |
| 2nd | 25 | 57 | Anthony Adams | Defensive tackle | San Francisco 49ers |

=== All-star games ===
| Game | Date | Site | Players |
|---|---|---|---|
| 57th Hula Bowl | February 1, 2003 | War Memorial Stadium, Wailuku, Hawaii | Gus Felder, Joe Iorio, Shawn Mayer |
| 54th Senior Bowl | January 18, 2003 | Ladd–Peebles Stadium, Mobile, Alabama | Anthony Adams, Michael Haynes, Bryant Johnson, Larry Johnson, Bryan Scott |

=== Instant replay ===
A few other conference coaches had lobbied for instant replay before, but they had fallen on deaf ears until Joe Paterno, who had been against instant replay citing the length of games as a factor, changed his opinion after a number of questionable officiating calls in the Iowa and Michigan games. Paterno and Penn State athletic director Tim Curley called for a comprehensive review of Big Ten officiating. At the news conference after the Michigan game, Paterno went further and said that the conference should change the way that officials are assigned, referring to the assignment of the officiating crew that worked the Michigan game, three of whom live in the state of Michigan.

After the Big Ten concluded its comprehensive review of its officiating, the conference implemented a pilot program during the 2003 season to evaluate the use of instant replay. The pilot was used to gather data and did not interfere with games or overturn any missed calls.

For the 2004 season, the Big Ten introduced college football's first instant replay system. A technical advisor in the press box with access to the television feeds will be able to stop a game for a replay review and potentially overturn a play, with no limit on the number of plays that can be reviewed.

== Notes ==
- Penn State set a new single season attendance record of 857,911 fans.
