= Zachary Mills =

Zachary Mills is the name of:

- Zach Mills (born 1995), American actor
- Zack Mills (born 1982), American football quarterback
- Zak Mills (born 1992), English footballer
