= Larry Johnson (American football coach) =

American football player and coach

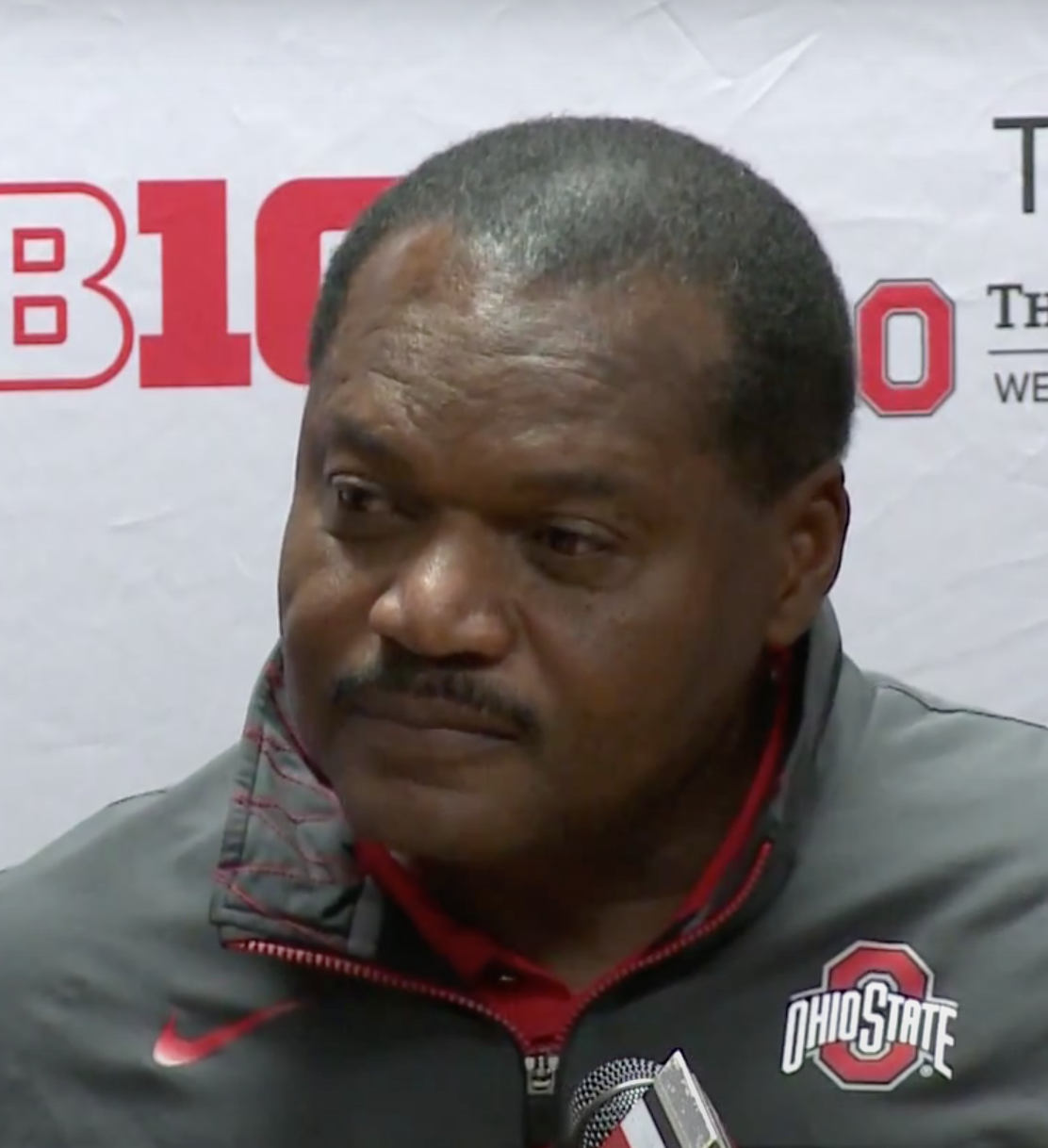
- Johnson in 2014

Current position
- Title: Associate head coach / Defensive line coach
- Team: Ohio State
- Conference: Big Ten

Biographical details
- Born: c. 1952 (age 73–74); Williamston, North Carolina, U.S.

Playing career
- 1970–1973: Elizabeth City State
- Position: Linebacker

Coaching career (HC unless noted)
- 1974: Lackey HS (MD) (Assistant)
- 1975–1991: Maurice J. McDonough HS (MD)
- 1992–1993: T. C. Williams HS (VA)
- 1996–1999: Penn State (DE/ST)
- 2000–2013: Penn State (DL)
- 2014–present: Ohio State (DL/AHC)

Accomplishments and honors

Championships
- 2× National champion (2014, 2024)

Larry A. Johnson (born c. 1952) is an American football defensive line and associate head coach for the Ohio State Buckeyes football team. Prior to joining Ohio State, he served as an assistant football coach at Pennsylvania State University from 1996 to 2013. Johnson was a high school football coach in the Washington, D.C. area from 1983 to 1993. He is the father of former National Football League running back Larry Johnson and former Penn State wide receiver Tony Johnson.

== Playing career ==
A native of Williamston, North Carolina, Johnson was a standout linebacker at Elizabeth City State University, earning NAIA All-America honors there in 1973. Johnson was initiated as a member of Iota Phi Theta fraternity while attending Elizabeth City State.

== High school coaching career ==
A prep coach in the state of Maryland, Johnson was a six-time coach-of-the-year, and architect of one of the most successful football programs in the Maryland public school system. From 1977 to 1991, Johnson's teams at Maurice J. McDonough High School in Pomfret, Maryland were annually ranked among the top squads in the Washington Metropolitan Area. In his final eight years, the Ram dynasty amassed an 82-10 record, made eight consecutive appearances in the state playoffs, were 8–2 in championship games and captured three Division 3A state championships (1983, 1985, and 1990). His overall record as head coach was 139–36.

From 1992 to 1993, Johnson was head coach at T. C. Williams High School in Alexandria, Virginia. He was hired by his brother AK Johnson, the school's athletic director.

== College coaching career ==
=== Penn State ===
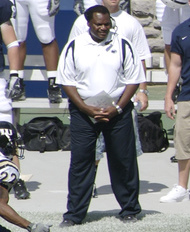
Johnson with Penn State in 2007

Johnson was the defensive line coach at Penn State from 2000 to 2013. From 1996 to 1999 he served as the Nittany Lions' defensive ends and special teams coach. In that time, Johnson developed a reputation for being a premier blue chip recruiter, consistently landing top talent from the mid-Atlantic states. He was instrumental in the development of five first-team All-Americans there: Devon Still, first-round NFL draft choices Tamba Hali, Michael Haynes, and Jimmy Kennedy, and former first-overall selection Courtney Brown.

Johnson was offered the defensive coordinator and assistant head coach job at Illinois in January 2009. He ultimately decided to continue at Penn State. On November 10, 2011 Tom Bradley announced that Johnson and linebackers coach Ron Vanderlinden would serve as co-defensive coordinators. On January 7, 2012, Johnson was retained as a coach on the team's staff with the arrival of new head coach Bill O'Brien. On January 1, 2014, Johnson was named interim head coach after O'Brien's departure to the NFL.

=== Ohio State ===
Johnson left Penn State following the 2013 season after 18 years when he was hired by Ohio State to be an assistant head coach and defensive line coach. At Ohio State, Johnson is known for his ability to develop several highly-touted NFL prospects such as Joey Bosa, Nick Bosa, and Chase Young. All three would later go on to win the NFL Defensive Rookie of the Year award in their respective seasons. Johnson is also lauded for developing the talents of recently drafted defensive linemen such as Sam Hubbard, Dre'Mont Jones, Zach Harrison, Tyquan Lewis, Tommy Togiai, Jonathon Cooper, and Tyreke Smith.

Johnson was Ohio State's acting head coach for the 2020 win over Michigan State after head coach Ryan Day had tested positive for COVID-19.

== Personal ==
Johnson has two sons, Larry, who was a running back at Penn State and for nine seasons in the NFL and Tony, who was a wide receiver at Penn State in the early 2000s.
