= Dick Honig =

American football official

Richard "Dick" Honig is a former American football official. He worked for 22 years in the Big Ten Conference (starting in 1983) and nine years in the Mid-American Conference and over 20 years as a basketball referee for the Mid-American Conference from 1978 to 2001. He also worked two years as a Reply Trainer and five years as a Rules Analyst for Big Ten Network. Working a total of 17 bowl games as an on-field official, Honig's final football game was the 2005 Sugar Bowl between Virginia Tech and Auburn. Honig's officiating career in Division I college football spans over a total of 350 games.

Honig was born on January 30, 1942. Born and raised in Detroit, Michigan, Honig began to play organized sports in high school and earned varsity letters in baseball, basketball, and football, and he received All-City and All-State honors in baseball and basketball two years in a row.

Honig is a 1963 graduate of the University of Michigan with bachelor's and master's degrees in kinesiology. He was an All-Big Ten shortstop on the Wolverines national championship baseball team in 1962. After graduating, Honig served as an assistant coach at Michigan for both the basketball and baseball teams from 1963 to 1973, which led him to his officiating career since the coaches were also officials. Many coaches at the time also officiated since coaches were not paid well at the time, making just $5,400 a year.

Honig is still involved with the Big Ten Conference in a supervisory role and operates instant replay during games. In its early years, Honig was instrumental in training officials for the European Federation of American Football, which he helped establish in 1988.

In 1984, Honig started Honig's Whistle Stop, an officials' supplies company, which would later turn into one of the largest officiating supply companies in the world. Honig started the business is his basement in 1984, and quickly acquired office space a year later. Before the web, Honig's used mail-order catalog and phone sales to build its business. Honig's has expanded its operation to eight branch offices throughout the United States and Canada, and is the uniform supplier for umpires working the College World Series. Honig owned and operated the Whistle Stop up until 2017, when he sold the company and started his retirement.

Honig and his wife, Liana, have four children and reside in Ann Arbor, Michigan.

== Memorable games ==
During a 2002 game between Iowa and Penn State, Honig was chased by Penn State head coach Joe Paterno following a 42–35 overtime victory by Iowa. Paterno was angered that Penn State wide receiver Tony Johnson caught a pass for a first down with both feet in bounds according to the stadium's video replay board, but the play was ruled an incompletion. The image of the coaching legend running down the official was shown repeatedly on sports highlight shows throughout the 2002 season, as many found it both amusing and amazing that a man his age could run so fast. This game was also a catalyst for the adoption of instant replay in the Big Ten Conference beginning in 2003.
