= 2002 Big Ten Conference football season =

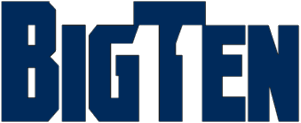
- League: NCAA Division I-A
- Sport: football
- Duration: August, 2002 through January, 2003
- Teams: 11
- TV partner(s): ABC, ESPN, ESPN2

2003 NFL Draft
- Top draft pick: Charles Rogers (Michigan State)
- Picked by: Detroit Lions, first round (2nd overall)

Regular Season
- Co-Champions: Ohio State; Iowa
- Runners-up: Michigan
- Season MVP: Brad Banks (Iowa)

Football seasons
- ← 2001 2003 →

2002 Big Ten Conference football standings
	Conf.			Overall
Team	W		L	W		L
No. 1 Ohio State $#+	8	–	0	14	–	0
No. 8 Iowa %+	8	–	0	11	–	2
No. 9 Michigan	6	–	2	10	–	3
No. 16 Penn State	5	–	3	9	–	4
Purdue	4	–	4	7	–	6
Illinois	4	–	4	5	–	7
Minnesota	3	–	5	8	–	5
Wisconsin	2	–	6	8	–	6
Michigan State	2	–	6	4	–	8
Northwestern	1	–	7	3	–	9
Indiana	1	–	7	3	–	9
# – BCS National Champion; $ – BCS representative as conference champion; % – BCS at-large representative; + – Conference co-champions; Rankings from AP Poll

The 2002 Big Ten Conference football season was the 107th season for the Big Ten Conference.

== Regular season ==
At 8-0 in conference play, Ohio State and Iowa shared the 2002 Big Ten championship. With a 13-0 regular season record, Ohio State was selected to play Miami in the 2003 Fiesta Bowl for the Bowl Championship Series National Championship.

== Bowl games ==
Date	Bowl game	Big Ten team	Opp. team	Score
Dec. 28, 2002	Alamo Bowl	Wisconsin	Colorado	31–28 (OT)
Dec. 30, 2002	Music City Bowl	Minnesota	Arkansas	29–14
Dec. 31, 2002	Sun Bowl	Purdue	Washington	34–24
Jan. 1, 2003	Outback Bowl	Michigan	Florida	38–30
Jan. 1, 2003	Capital One Bowl	Penn State	Auburn	9–13
Jan. 1, 2003	Orange Bowl	Iowa	USC	38–17
Jan. 3, 2003	Fiesta Bowl (BCS Championship)	Ohio State	Miami (FL)	31–24 (2OT)

== See also ==
- 2002 All-Big Ten Conference football team
