= 2002 Indiana Hoosiers football team =

American college football season

2002 Indiana Hoosiers football
- Conference: Big Ten Conference
- Record: 3–9 (1–7 Big Ten)
- Head coach: Gerry DiNardo (1st season)
- Offensive coordinator: Al Borges (1st season)
- Defensive coordinator: Tim Kish (1st season)
- MVP: Kris Dielman
- Captains: Enoch DeMar; Kris Dielman
- Home stadium: Memorial Stadium

2002 Big Ten Conference football standings
	Conf.			Overall
Team	W		L	W		L
No. 1 Ohio State $#+	8	–	0	14	–	0
No. 8 Iowa %+	8	–	0	11	–	2
No. 9 Michigan	6	–	2	10	–	3
No. 16 Penn State	5	–	3	9	–	4
Purdue	4	–	4	7	–	6
Illinois	4	–	4	5	–	7
Minnesota	3	–	5	8	–	5
Wisconsin	2	–	6	8	–	6
Michigan State	2	–	6	4	–	8
Northwestern	1	–	7	3	–	9
Indiana	1	–	7	3	–	9
# – BCS National Champion; $ – BCS representative as conference champion; % – BCS at-large representative; + – Conference co-champions; Rankings from AP Poll

The 2002 Indiana Hoosiers football team represented Indiana University Bloomington during the 2002 NCAA Division I-A football season. They participated as members of the Big Ten Conference. The Hoosiers played their home games at Memorial Stadium in Bloomington, Indiana. The team was coached by Gerry DiNardo in his first year as head coach. The Hoosiers finished the 2002 season with a 3–9 (1–7 Big Ten) record to finish last in the Big Ten.

== Schedule ==
Date	Time	Opponent	Site	TV	Result	Attendance
August 31	4:00 pm	No. 9 (I-AA) William & Mary*	Memorial Stadium; Bloomington, IN		W 25–17	33,427
September 7	7:00 pm	at Utah*	Rice–Eccles Stadium; Salt Lake City, UT		L 13–40	33,419
September 14	5:00 pm	at Kentucky*	Commonwealth Stadium; Lexington, KY (rivalry)		L 17–27	70,347
September 21	4:00 pm	Central Michigan*	Memorial Stadium; Bloomington, IN		W 39–29	32,740
September 28	12:00 pm	at No. 6 Ohio State	Ohio Stadium; Columbus, OH	ESPN Plus	L 17–45	104,538
October 12	12:00 pm	No. 23 Wisconsin	Memorial Stadium; Bloomington, IN	ESPN Plus	W 32–29	31,156
October 19	12:00 pm	No. 15 Iowa^{†}	Memorial Stadium; Bloomington, IN	ESPN Plus	L 8–24	33,458
October 26	1:00 pm	at Illinois	Memorial Stadium; Champaign, IL (rivalry)		L 14–45	50,295
November 2	12:00 pm	at Northwestern	Ryan Field; Evanston, IL	ESPN Plus	L 37–41	25,077
November 9	1:00 pm	Michigan State	Memorial Stadium; Bloomington, IN (rivalry)		L 21–56	29,253
November 16	3:30 pm	No. 16 Penn State	Memorial Stadium; Bloomington, IN	ESPN2	L 25–58	27,454
November 23	3:30 pm	at Purdue	Ross–Ade Stadium; West Lafayette, IN (Old Oaken Bucket)	ESPN	L 10–34	59,114
*Non-conference game; ^{†}Homecoming; Rankings from AP Poll released prior to the game; All times are in Eastern time

== Roster ==
2002 Indiana Hoosiers football team roster
Players
Coaches
Offense

Pos.	#	Name	Class
FB	46	Rob Bouchard	Sr
OL	71	Bobby Brandt	Sr
G	70	Enoch DeMar	Sr
TE	87	Aaron Halterman	So
QB	17	Gibran Hamdan	Sr
QB	14	Tommy Jones	Sr
QB	10	Matt LoVecchio	So
WR	19	Courtney Roby	So
OL	76	Issac Sowells	Fr
RB	30	Chris Taylor	Fr

Defense =

Pos.	#	Name	Class
DE	94	Victor Adeyanju	Fr
DE	99	Derek Barnett	Sr
DL	96	Chris Beaty	So
DL	90	Jeremy Belcher	Sr
LB	15	Ron Bethel	Sr
DL	83	Kris Dielman	Sr
S	21	Herana-Daze Jones	So
S	8	Buster Larkins	Fr

Special teams

Pos.	#	Name	Class

Head coach

- Gerry DiNardo

Coordinators/assistant coaches

Legend

- (C) Team captain
- (S) Suspended
- (I) Ineligible
- Injured
- Redshirt

Roster
Last update: 2002-10-15

== 2003 NFL draftees ==
Player	Round	Pick	Position	NFL club
Gibran Hamdan	7	232	Quarterback	Washington Redskins
