= Larry Johnson (running back) =

American football player (born 1979)

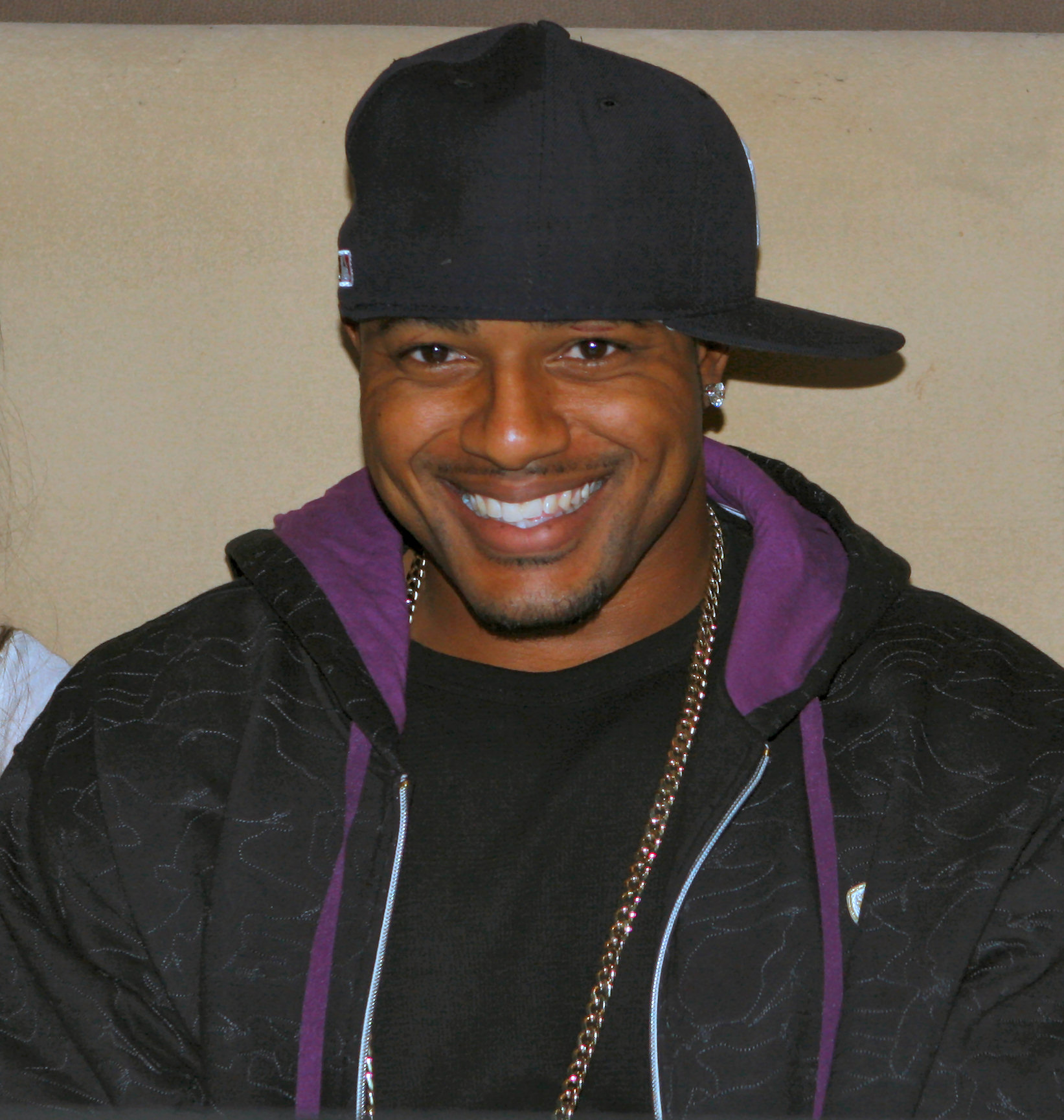
- Johnson in 2006

No. 34, 27, 23
- Position: Running back

Personal information
- Born: November 19, 1979 (age 47); Pomfret, Maryland, U.S.
- Listed height: 6 ft 1 in (1.85 m)
- Listed weight: 235 lb (107 kg)

Career information
- High school: State College Area
- College: Penn State (1998–2002)
- NFL draft: 2003: 1st round, 27th overall pick

Career history
- Kansas City Chiefs (2003–2009); Cincinnati Bengals (2009); Washington Redskins (2010); Miami Dolphins (2011)

Awards and highlights
- First-team All-Pro (2006); Second-team All-Pro (2005); 2× Pro Bowl (2005, 2006); Maxwell Award (2002); Walter Camp Award (2002); Doak Walker Award (2002); Jim Brown Trophy (2002); Unanimous All-American (2002); First-team All-Big Ten (2002); NFL record: 416 rush attempts in a single season (2006)

Career NFL statistics
- Rushing yards: 6,223
- Rushing average: 4.4
- Rushing touchdowns: 55
- Receptions: 154
- Receiving yards: 1,373
- Receiving touchdowns: 6
- Stats at Pro Football Reference

Larry Alphonso Johnson Jr. (born November 19, 1979) is an American former professional football player who was a running back in the National Football League (NFL). He played college football for the Penn State Nittany Lions, winning the Maxwell Award and earning unanimous All-American honors in 2002. He was selected by the Kansas City Chiefs in the first round of the 2003 NFL draft, and also played for the Cincinnati Bengals, the Washington Redskins, and the Miami Dolphins.

== Early life ==
Johnson was born in Pomfret, Maryland. He was one of three children born to Christine and Larry Johnson Sr. His father is a former high school vice-principal, a high school football coach, former defensive line coach at Penn State University, and the current defensive line coach at Ohio State University. Johnson graduated from State College Area High School in State College, Pennsylvania, where he played for the State College Little Lions high school football team.

== College career ==
Johnson attended Pennsylvania State University, and played for coach Joe Paterno's Penn State Nittany Lions football team from 1999 to 2002. As a senior in 2002, he rushed for over 2,000 yards in a season without winning the Heisman Trophy, despite doing so with fewer carries than any other running back in the 2,000-yard club (this record was broken on November 22, 2014, by Wisconsin's Melvin Gordon, who gained 2,000 yards on 241 carries—10 fewer than Johnson's 251). He averaged 8.0 yards per carry during the regular season. Johnson broke the Penn State record for rushing yards in a game three times in 2002. His 257 yards in a 49–0 home thrashing of Northwestern broke Curt Warner's previous record of 256 yards set against Syracuse in 1981. He then went on to rack up 279 yards in an 18–7 home win against Illinois and 327 yards in a 58–25 road win against Indiana. He surpassed the 2,000-yard mark by gaining 279 yards on just 19 attempts in the Penn State Nittany Lions' final Big Ten Conference game against Michigan State. Johnson gained all 279 of his rushing yards in the first half, and was kept on the bench for the entire second half of the game. He finished the 2002 season with 2,087 yards.

Following his 2002 senior season, Johnson was a first-team All-Big Ten selection and a unanimous first-team All-American. He also won the Doak Walker Award (top running back), the Maxwell Award (top college player), and the Walter Camp Award (top college player). Johnson rushed for 2,159 yards and 29 touchdowns. He earned a Bachelor of Arts degree in integrative arts from Penn State in 2002.

== Professional career ==
=== Kansas City Chiefs ===
==== 2003–06 ====
Johnson was chosen in the first round with the 27th overall pick of the 2003 NFL draft as insurance for the Kansas City Chiefs, who were unsure if Priest Holmes would be healthy or even sign a contract extension. Johnson was drafted over the objection of head coach Dick Vermeil, who wanted to select a defensive player, and despite the lack of recent NFL success by Penn State running backs (Blair Thomas, Ki-Jana Carter, and Curtis Enis). Vermeil criticized Johnson for his casual approach toward preparation. The conflicts between Johnson and Vermeil grew, and in 2004 Vermeil said that Johnson needed to grow up and "take the diapers off."

Johnson took great offense to this comment, and the public estrangement led to rumors that he would be traded. However, towards the end of the 2004 season, Johnson got an opportunity to start after injuries to Priest Holmes and Derrick Blaylock.

Facing the same situation in 2005, with Blaylock gone and Holmes having gone down with a season-ending neck injury in early November, Johnson on November 20 against the Houston Texans ran for a Chiefs' record 211 rushing yards and two touchdowns. He led the league in rushing yards and touchdowns after the injury to Holmes.

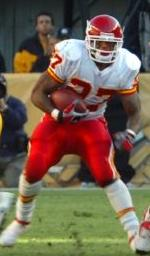
Johnson in a game in 2006

At the end of the 2005 regular season, Johnson had nine consecutive games with 100+ rushing yards, passing the 100-yard mark in every start for the Chiefs that season and earning a Pro Bowl berth. During the final game of the 2005 regular season, Johnson set a new franchise record of 1,750 rushing yards in one season, despite not starting in 7 games during the season. In addition Johnson caught 33 passes for 343 yards, averaging over 10 yards per reception. Johnson was named the 2005 MVP for the Chiefs. The Chiefs' record in 2005 was 10–6, but they did not make the playoffs in spite of a winning record.

With injuries limiting Holmes during the previous two seasons, Johnson began the 2006 season as Kansas City's featured back. He rushed for 1,789 yards (second in the league) on 416 carries, an NFL record for most carries in a season. The Chiefs made an appearance in the playoffs with a 9–7 record, where Johnson ran for 32 yards on 13 carries against the Indianapolis Colts. At the conclusion of the season, Johnson was selected for his second Pro Bowl appearance.

==== 2007–09 ====
On June 21, 2007, Johnson stated that he was willing to sit out the Chiefs' training camp unless he and the Chiefs reached an agreement on a new contract. On July 22, rumors spread about Johnson being traded to the Green Bay Packers. The initial asking price was a first-, second-, and third-round draft pick. Starting on July 27 with the beginning of training camp, he began a holdout during which he was fined $14,000 per day by the team, and did not report to training camp until nearly a month later when he and the team agreed to a five-year contract extension that locked Johnson up with the Chiefs through the 2012 season. As a result of the extension, Johnson was the highest-paid running back in the NFL based on average salary per year. His new contract covered six years and was to pay him $45 million, with $19 million in guaranteed money—the biggest contract in Chiefs history.

In week 9 of the 2007 regular season, Johnson was sidelined late in the 4th quarter against the Green Bay Packers with a foot injury. The injury was season-ending; Johnson did not see any playing time in the rest of the 2007 season, and was placed on the injured reserve list. Johnson ended the season with 559 yards on 158 attempts, and only three rushing touchdowns.

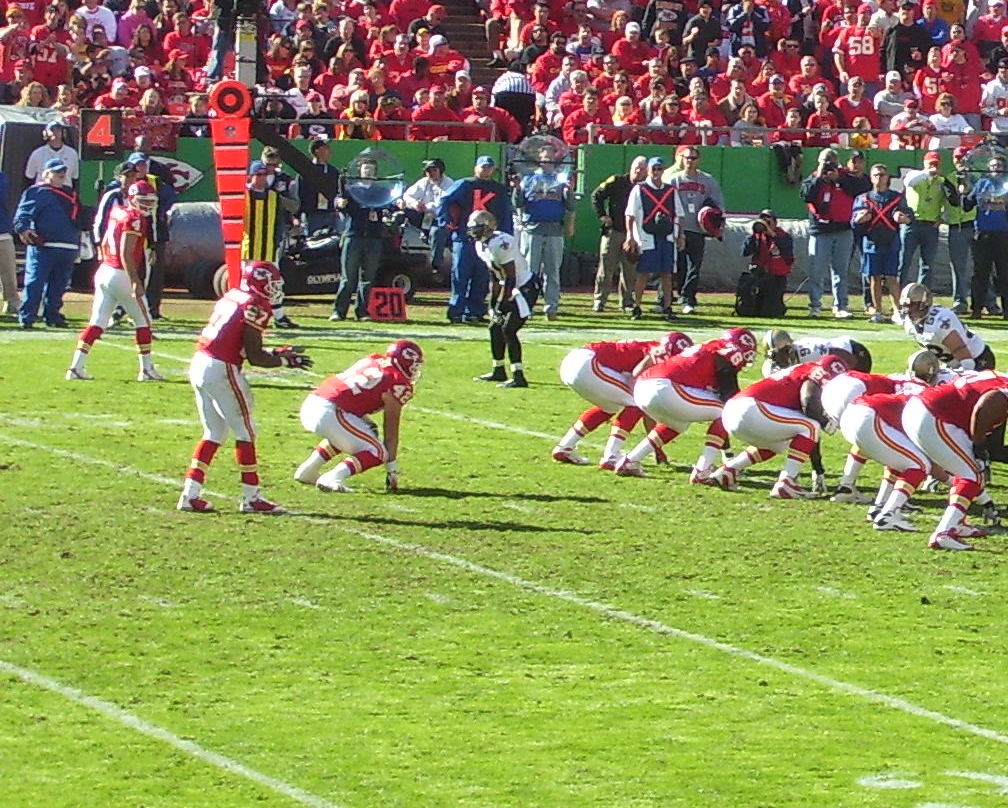
Johnson lining up in the Wildcat formation in 2008

In Johnson's first regular season game since his injury, he rushed for 74 yards on 22 carries with an average of 3.4 yards per carry against the New England Patriots on September 7, 2008. The Chiefs lost the game 17–10. After a loss to the Oakland Raiders the following week, Johnson spoke out about his low number of carries. In his next two games, Johnson rushed for a combined 319 yards on 52 attempts with an average of 6.1 yards per carry.

Johnson was suspended for the Chiefs' game against the Tennessee Titans on October 18 for violating team rules. Johnson also was benched for the following game against the New York Jets. Johnson, after weeks of being inactive for the Chiefs, was suspended by league commissioner Roger Goodell for the team's week 10 game against the San Diego Chargers, for violating the league's personal conduct policy, after he was charged with simple assault for allegedly spitting his drink in a woman's face (the fourth time in five years he had been accused of assaulting a woman), and as he awaited a court date for allegedly pushing another woman's face. The suspension cost him $147,000; one game check. He finished the season with 874 yards and five touchdowns.

Johnson's 2009 season got off to a very slow start, despite Johnson keeping his starting job. As of week 8, he had 132 attempts for only 358 yards. His 2.7 yards per carry were the worst of any NFL running back with at least 70 carries.

On October 27, 2009, the Chiefs "instructed Larry to refrain from practicing with the Chiefs or participating in other team activities" for his Twitter comments on Chiefs' head coach Todd Haley and reportedly using gay slurs when he addressed the media. Because of his comments, Johnson encountered backlash from the Gay & Lesbian Alliance Against Defamation. Johnson's Twitter comments were: "My father got more credentials than most of these pro coaches." That was followed by: "My father played for the coach from "remember the titans". Our coach played golf. My father played for redskins briefley. Our coach. Nuthn." Johnson's tweets were responded to by fans, one tweet including a reference to his nightclub incident. Johnson's response used the word "fag". The final post read: "Make me regret it. Lmao. U don't stop my checks. Lmao. So 'tweet' away." Johnson subsequently said about the incidents, "First of all, I want to apologize to the fans of the Kansas City Chiefs and the rest of the NFL, Commissioner Goodell, the Chiefs organization, Coach Todd Haley, his staff, and my teammates for the words I used yesterday. I regret my actions. The words were used by me in frustration, and they were not appropriate."

On October 28, 2009, the Chiefs suspended Johnson until November 9 for "conduct detrimental to the club". They ultimately agreed to a deal with his agent, Peter Schaffer, in which he would only lose one game check ($300,000). At the time of the suspension, Johnson was only 75 yards from passing Priest Holmes as the franchise's all-time leading rusher. This angered several fans, who started a petition demanding that the Chiefs either deactivate, release, or waive him. The petition said that Johnson "has never represented anything close to the values that we have for our Chiefs" and thus did not deserve the record.

On November 9, the day Johnson was due to return from his suspension, the Chiefs waived him. Reportedly, the final straw for Chiefs general manager Scott Pioli was yet another tweet in which Johnson belittled a fan for making less money than he made. Johnson's agent, Schaffer, issued the following statement: "A part of him is excited and a part of him is very regretful. There's a lot of feelings going on right now. It's analogous to breaking up with a girlfriend. Maybe you saw it coming, but it still hurts when it happens."

=== Cincinnati Bengals ===
In November 2009, Johnson signed with the Cincinnati Bengals for the prorated league minimum pay. Johnson served as backup to starting running back Cedric Benson. In the Bengals week 12 win over the Browns, Johnson rushed for 107 yards, his only 100-yard game of the season.

=== Washington Redskins ===
Johnson signed a three-year contract worth up to $12 million with the Washington Redskins as an unrestricted free agent on March 12, 2010. He played for former Denver Broncos coach Mike Shanahan. On September 21, 2010, Johnson was released by the Redskins.

=== Miami Dolphins ===
In July of 2011, Johnson went on a local radio station in Florida and predicted that he would be signed to the Miami Dolphins.

On August 23, 2011, Johnson signed with the Miami Dolphins. On September 3, the Dolphins terminated Johnson's contract during final roster cuts. He rushed for 46 yards and one touchdown on 12 carries in the 2011 preseason. However, he was re-signed on September 8 after an injury to Daniel Thomas. He was released following the Dolphins' week 2 loss to the Houston Texans, when he ran the ball only once for a two-yard gain.

== Career statistics ==
=== NFL ===
Legend
	NFL record
**Bold**	Career high

==== Regular season ====
Year	Team	Games		Rushing					Receiving					Fumbles	
Year	Team	GP	GS	Att	Yds	Y/A	Lng	TD	Rec	Yds	Y/R	Lng	TD	Fum	Lost
2003	KC	6	0	20	85	4.3	15	1	1	2	2	2	0	0	0
2004	KC	10	3	120	581	4.8	46T	9	22	278	**12.6**	40	**2**	0	0
2005	KC	**16**	9	336	1,750	**5.2**	49T	**20**	33	343	10.4	36	1	**5**	**4**
2006	KC	**16**	**16**	**416**	**1,789**	4.3	47	17	**41**	**410**	10.0	**78**	**2**	2	2
2007	KC	8	8	158	559	3.5	54	3	30	186	6.2	30T	1	1	1
2008	KC	12	12	193	874	4.5	**65**	5	12	74	6.2	20	0	**5**	1
2009	KC	7	7	132	377	2.9	19	0	12	76	6.3	22	0	2	1
2009	CIN	7	0	46	204	4.4	27	0	3	4	1.3	6	0	0	0
2010	WAS	2	0	5	2	0.4	7	0	0	0	0	0	0	0	0
2011	MIA	1	0	1	2	2.0	2	0	0	0	0	0	0	0	0
Career		85	55	1,427	6,223	4.4	65	55	154	1,373	8.9	78	6	15	9

==== Postseason ====
Year	Team	Games		Rushing					Receiving					Fumbles	
Year	Team	GP	GS	Att	Yds	Y/A	Lng	TD	Rec	Yds	Y/R	Lng	TD	Fum	Lost
2006	KC	1	1	13	32	2.5	6	0	5	29	5.8	13	0	0	0
Career		1	1	13	32	2.5	6	0	5	29	5.8	13	0	0	0

=== College ===
Season	Year	GP	Rushing				Receiving		
Season	Year	GP	Att	Yds	Avg	TD	Rec	Yds	TD
1999	Penn State	12	43	171	4.0	1	4	74	1
2000	Penn State	12	75	358	4.8	3	9	122	1
2001	Penn State	12	71	337	4.7	2	11	136	2
2002	Penn State	12	271	2,087	7.7	20	41	349	3
College		48	460	2,953	6.4	26	65	681	7

== Career highlights ==
=== Awards and honors ===
NFL

- First-team All-Pro (2006)
- Second-team All-Pro (2005)
- 2× Pro Bowl (2005, 2006)

College

- Maxwell Award (2002)
- Walter Camp Award (2002)
- Doak Walker Award (2002)
- Jim Brown Trophy (2002)
- Unanimous All-American (2002)
- First-team All-Big Ten (2002)

=== Records ===
==== NFL records ====
- Most rushing attempts in a single season: 416 (2006)

==== Chiefs franchise records ====
- Most career rushing attempts (1,375)
- Most rushing yards in a single season: 1,789 (2006)

== Personal life ==
Johnson and his father, Larry Sr., maintain a close relationship. Johnson's brother and manager, Tony Johnson, is a former starting wide receiver for Penn State from 2000 to 2003.

Johnson appeared on the cover of the PlayStation 2 game NCAA GameBreaker 2004 in a Penn State uniform. In 2007, Johnson appeared in Fantasia's music video for the song "When I See U". Johnson also made an appearance in Jay-Z's music video "Roc Boys (And the Winner Is)...". In October 2013, TMZ reported that Johnson had been a recurring guest DJ at Miami strip club Tootsie's Cabaret.

Because of memory loss, suicidal impulses, mood swings, and headaches, Johnson believes he has chronic traumatic encephalopathy (which can't be diagnosed until an autopsy is performed on the brain after death). Johnson also states that he does not remember playing two seasons. His method of dealing with the trauma is to control his social interactions and spend quality time with his daughter.

=== Controversies ===
Since 2020, Johnson has been criticized for posts on his Twitter account supporting various conspiracy theories. After Johnson made posts accusing the "Jewish cabal" of sex trafficking, torturing children, and worshipping Satan, CNN reporter Jake Tapper denounced his comments as "antisemitic garbage". Johnson has also tweeted conspiracy theories about freemasonry, homosexuality, and about celebrity deaths. After the death of Kobe Bryant, Johnson claimed that LeBron James made a "blood sacrifice" to kill Bryant in exchange for the Los Angeles Lakers winning the 2020 NBA Finals. He has also claimed that Tom Brady and other NFL players are part of the occult, and that the NFL rigs and scripts its games.

== Legal troubles ==
Johnson has been arrested at least six times since 2003. Five of his arrests were on various assault charges against women, four while he was an active player in the NFL.

In December 2003, he was arrested for felony aggravated assault and misdemeanor domestic battery for slapping and waving a gun at his then-girlfriend as he threatened her, during an argument at his home. The charges were dropped after Johnson agreed to participate in a domestic violence diversion program. He was required to complete 120 hours of community service, attend an anger management course, and stay out of trouble for two years.

In September 2005, Johnson was again arrested for assault when a 25-year-old woman accused Johnson of pushing her to the ground in a Kansas City bar. Johnson turned himself in and was cited for domestic abuse assault; he posted bond and was released. But the case was dropped after the alleged victim failed to appear in court for three hearings.

His third arrest for assault came in February 2008, after he allegedly shoved a 26-year-old woman's head at a Kansas City nightclub.

In October 2008, Johnson was arrested for the fourth time and charged with one count of non-aggravated assault for allegedly spitting a drink in a 24-year-old woman's face and threatening to kill her boyfriend at a Kansas City nightclub on October 11. The woman filed a civil suit against Johnson, accusing him of negligence, assault and battery, intentional infliction of emotional distress, and negligent infliction of emotional distress.

Johnson was deactivated for the October 19, 2008, game against the Tennessee Titans for violating an undisclosed team rule. The team said his suspension for the game was unrelated to the criminal investigation.

In March 2009, Johnson pleaded guilty to two counts of disturbing the peace, regarding the two incidents in 2008, and was sentenced to two years' probation. In July 2010 a judge admonished him in court for failing to perform his full community service, said he "puts people in jail every day for not doing community service," but chose not to do so and instead reinstated Johnson's probation. The City Prosecutor said he was supposed to send a monthly form to his probation officer, but failed to, and also failed to report to his probation officer that he had been stopped by police in Virginia and cited for not having a driver's license. After the 20-minute hearing, Johnson walked out of the courtroom smiling.

On October 5, 2012, Johnson was again arrested, in Las Vegas for domestic violence charges that included beating and strangulation of a former girlfriend at the Bellagio resort Las Vegas Strip hotel and casino. The 32-year-old woman was said to have had several injuries to her face, bruising on her neck, and been choked into unconsciousness. Johnson pretended to run from hotel security officers, and told one security officer he would rip his vocal cords out. He was booked into the Clark County Detention Center with bond set at $15,000, and was released after spending 18 hours behind bars. He faced a maximum five years in jail, and a $15,000 fine. However, a felony charge was dropped as part of a plea deal, and he was ruled guilty of misdemeanor domestic violence battery and assault, and sentenced to one year of probation and ordered to pay a $345 fine, perform 48 hours of community service, and attend six months of counseling.

On October 7, 2014, Johnson was arrested for the sixth time after punching a 29-year-old man in a Miami Beach club, and allegedly cutting him with a broken bottle. He was charged with aggravated battery and booked into the Miami-Dade County jail with bond set at $7,500. Johnson later pleaded guilty to battery and was sentenced to 12 months' probation, 60 hours of community service, and must submit to substance abuse evaluations, and stay away from the victim and the club.

== See also ==
- List of NCAA major college football yearly rushing leaders
- Living former players diagnosed with or reporting symptoms of chronic traumatic encephalopathy
