= Jonathan Stupar =

American football player (born 1984)

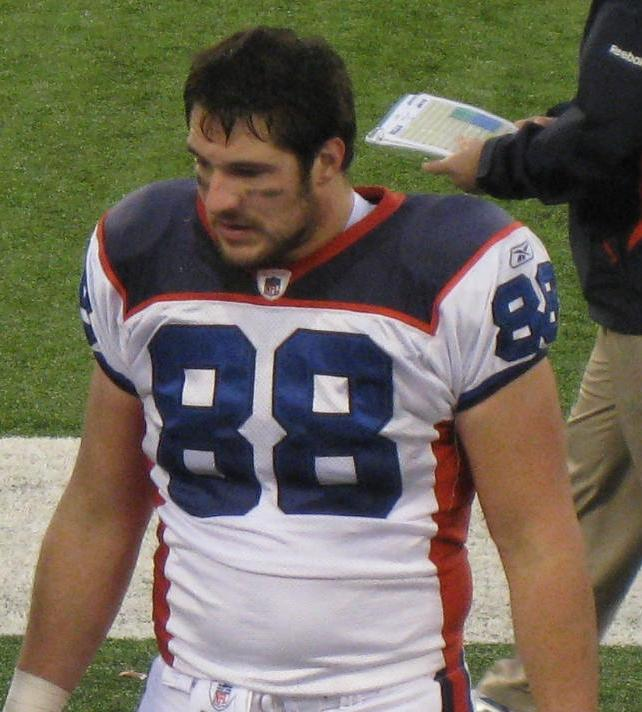
- Stupar with the Buffalo Bills in 2011

No. 88
- Position: Tight end

Personal information
- Born: July 27, 1984 (age 42); State College, Pennsylvania, U.S.
- Listed height: 6 ft 4 in (1.93 m)
- Listed weight: 254 lb (115 kg)

Career information
- High school: State College Area
- College: Virginia
- NFL draft: 2008: undrafted

Career history
- New England Patriots (2008)*; Buffalo Bills (2008–2010); Baltimore Ravens (2011)*
- * Offseason or practice squad member only

Career NFL statistics
- Receptions: 18
- Receiving yards: 151
- Stats at Pro Football Reference

Jonathan Stupar (born July 27, 1984) is an American former professional football player who was a tight end in the National Football League (NFL). He played college football for the Virginia Cavaliers. He was signed by the New England Patriots as an undrafted free agent in 2008.

He was also a member of the Buffalo Bills and Baltimore Ravens.

== Professional career ==
=== New England Patriots ===
Stupar signed with the New England Patriots as an undrafted free agent in 2008.

=== Buffalo Bills ===
After being cut by the New England Patriots, he signed with the Buffalo Bills. He did not play in 2008, received limited playing time with the Bills as a backup the next two seasons.

=== Baltimore Ravens ===
Stupar signed with the Baltimore Ravens before training camp began in 2011, but he was waived on August 27.

== Personal life ==
Stupar is the nephew of two-time Super Bowl-winning NFL quarterback Jeff Hostetler, and the brother of former NFL linebacker Nathan Stupar. His father was also a lineman at Penn State from 1976 to 1979.
