= State College Area High School =

Coordinates: 40.7824°N 77.8572°W

- State High
- Westerly Parkway; State College, Centre County, Pennsylvania 16801; United States

Information
- School type: Public, Secondary
- Established: 1894
- School district: State College Area School District
- Superintendent: Curtis Johnson
- CEEB code: 394685
- Principal: Laura Tobias
- Teaching staff: 203.74 (FTE)
- Grades: 9–12
- Student to teacher ratio: 11.52
- Houses: South Building; North Building
- Colors: Maroon and gray
- Fight song: Anchors Aweigh
- Athletics conference: PIAA District 6
- Mascot: Little Lion
- Communities served: Borough of State College and the Townships of College, Ferguson, Halfmoon, Harris, and Patton
- Graduates (2024): 593
- Website: hs.scasd.org

State College Area High School, colloquially known as "State High," is a public high school in State College, Pennsylvania, United States. It is the only public high school in the State College Area School District and is within walking distance of Penn State University. It is 5 minutes away by car from Mount Nittany Middle School, and 10 minutes away from Park Forest Middle School.

== Campus ==
The high school, which includes north and south campus facilities totaling 680,000 square feet (63,000 m^{2}), is on the fringe of downtown State College, and spans Westerly Parkway.

=== South ===
==== Main Campus ====
A state-of-the-art 520,000 square feet (48,000 m^{2}) south campus facility was constructed in 2018 on the site of the original South Building. This building serves as State High’s main campus.

==== Original South Building ====
The original South Building was built in 1962 and had undergone numerous renovations. This original part of the building was single story and included classrooms along with the auditorium, gymnasium, cafeteria and main office area. In 1965, a single story addition was built, but due to grade changes on the site it operates as a second level. This addition included classrooms, the Library and the fitness center. Another classroom wing was built in 1999. Some aspects of the Career and Technical Center program were also included in the South High School. The building, which had also been a junior high school and then an intermediate high school, was demolished to make room for the new state-of-the-art 520,000 square feet (48,000 m^{2}) main campus facility.

=== North ===
==== Building ====
A 160,000 square feet (15,000 m^{2}) north campus facility was constructed in 2019 on the site of the original Senior High School North Building. The buildout renovated the school building and added additional turf athletic fields where the North Building once stood.

==== Original North Building ====
The original North Building was built in 1955 and had undergone numerous renovations. The building's original portion, centered around the Logan Avenue entrance, was two-story and included classrooms along with the auditorium, two gymnasia, one cafeteria, library and main office area. In 1965, a two-story classroom addition was built parallel to Westerly Parkway. In 1989, the natatorium and a new gymnasium were added to the building. An additional classroom wing was constructed in 1999. Some aspects of the Career and Technology Center program were also included in the North High School. The building was demolished in 2018–19 to make room for a new 160,000 square feet (15,000 m^{2}) facility.

== Delta Program ==
The Delta Program is a democratic school of choice associated with State High. Students are encouraged to use community resources and can take classes from the high school, Delta, and Penn State. Delta Students enjoy small class sizes, mixed grade levels, and a set of freedoms which are typically restricted to college-age learning. To encourage a unity between teachers and students, teachers are referred to on a first name basis. The program also opened a middle level program, which proved to be quite popular.

- Community service is an important aspect of the Delta experience. Each year a student has to maintain 30 hours annually to stay within the Delta Community.
- Students, parents, and advisors meet regularly to discuss academic progress and set new goals. These meetings allow the teachers and parents one-on-one time with the student to discuss achievements as well as any problems the student may be having.
- Students are allowed open campus and are free to leave the Delta building during their lunch and free periods. Many students walk downtown, which is only a few minutes away from the school.

== Driver's education ==
In 1932, Amos Neyhart, assistant professor at Penn State University, began the country's first driver's education in-car course at State College Area High School. The program was altered after the 2010–2011 school year due to budget cuts from the new school board, which removed the course's behind-the-wheel component.

== Notable alumni ==
=== Academia ===
- Harry Atwater – professor of applied physics and materials science at Caltech
- Francis Fukuyama – political scientist, author of The End of History and the Last Man
- Charles Myers – former labor economist, author, and professor

=== Athletics ===
- Stan Belinda – former Major League Baseball pitcher
- Spencer Bivens – Major League Baseball pitcher
- Jack Hurley – baseball outfielder in the Arizona Diamondbacks organization
- Larry Johnson Jr. – former Penn State Football running back, played most recently for the Miami Dolphins, brother of Tony Johnson, son of Larry Johnson
- Tony Johnson – former Penn State Football player, brother of Larry Johnson Jr., son of Larry Johnson
- David Kimball – former NFL and NFL Europe placekicker
- Rob Koll – head wrestling coach at the University of North Carolina, son of Bill Koll
- Butch Leitzinger – professional race car driver in the American Le Mans Series
- Gabe Norwood – former NCAA basketball player, currently playing in the professional PBA league, brother of Jordan Norwood
- Jordan Norwood – former NFL wide receiver, former Penn State Football wide receiver, brother of Gabe Norwood
- Barry Parkhill – former American Basketball Association shooting guard, brother of Bruce Parkhill
- Bruce Parkhill – former head college men's basketball coach, brother of Barry Parkhill
- Jay Paterno – author, former football coach, son of Joe Paterno
- Matt Rhule – head football coach at the University of Nebraska
- Braeden Shrewsberry – college basketball player for the Notre Dame Fighting Irish
- Matt Suhey – former fullback for the Chicago Bears, former Penn State Football running back, son of Steve Suhey
- Jonathan Stupar – former Virginia Cavaliers and NFL tight end for the Buffalo Bills, brother of Nate Stupar
- Nate Stupar – former Penn State Football linebacker, played most recently for the New York Giants, brother of Jonathan Stupar
- Ron Dickerson Jr. – former Arkansas Razorbacks football and NFL player, head football coach at Benedict College

=== Business and politics ===
- Kerry Benninghoff – member of the Pennsylvania House of Representatives from the 171st Legislative District
- Galen Dreibelbis – real estate developer, former member of the Pennsylvania House of Representatives
- Herman Fisher – co-founder of Fisher-Price
- Bill Welch – former mayor of State College

=== Arts and communications ===
- Masi Asare – Tony Award nominated musical theatre lyricist, composer, and playwright
- Joseph Bertolino- half of hip-hop duo Joey Valence & Brae
- Ian Hendrickson-Smith – jazz saxophonist with Sharon Jones and the Dap-Kings and The Roots
- Laura Secor – American journalist whose work has focused on Iranian Politics and Iran-US relations. Her work is regularly featured in The New Yorker.
- Doug Sweetland – Annie-award-winning Pixar animator
- John Taylor – lead guitarist and musical director for the Jonas Brothers
