= Michael Robinson (fullback) =

American football player (born 1983)

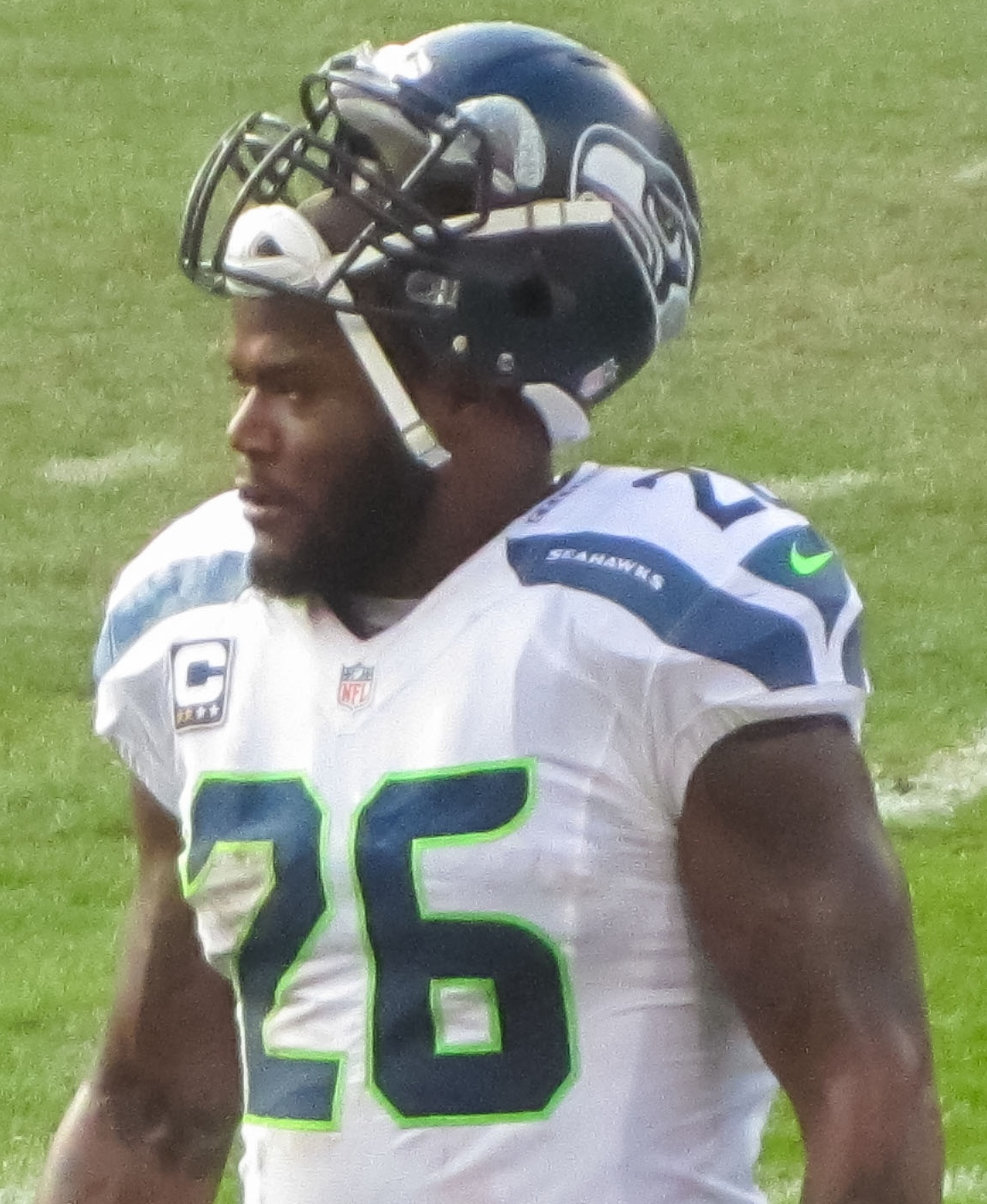
- Robinson with the Seattle Seahawks in 2012

No. 24, 26
- Position: Fullback

Personal information
- Born: February 6, 1983 (age 43); Richmond, Virginia, U.S.
- Listed height: 6 ft 1 in (1.85 m)
- Listed weight: 240 lb (109 kg)

Career information
- High school: Varina (Henrico, Virginia)
- College: Penn State (2001–2005)
- NFL draft: 2006: 4th round, 100th overall pick

Career history
- San Francisco 49ers (2006–2009); Seattle Seahawks (2010–2013)

Awards and highlights
- Super Bowl champion (XLVIII); Pro Bowl (2011); Big Ten Most Valuable Player (2005); Big Ten Co-Offensive Player of the Year (2005); Second-team All-Big Ten (2005)

Career NFL statistics
- Rushing attempts: 115
- Rushing yards: 422
- Rushing touchdowns: 2
- Receptions: 75
- Receiving yards: 610
- Receiving touchdowns: 3
- Stats at Pro Football Reference

Burton Michael Robinson (born February 6, 1983) is an American former professional football player who was a fullback in the National Football League (NFL). He was selected by the San Francisco 49ers in the fourth round of the 2006 NFL draft. He is currently an analyst for the NFL Network and NBC.

Robinson played college football for the Penn State Nittany Lions. He played as a quarterback and wide receiver, leading the team to a Big Ten Conference title in 2005 and being recognized as the Big Ten Most Valuable Player and co-Offensive Player of the Year.

In 2011, he was elected to his first and only Pro Bowl as a member of the Seattle Seahawks. In his last year with the Seahawks, he helped the team win Super Bowl XLVIII.

== Early life ==
Robinson attended Varina High School, where he was a four-year starter at quarterback. He was a two-time Associated Press first-team All-State selection and a three-time member of the Richmond Times-Dispatch All-Metro team, Richmond Times-Dispatch Offensive Player of the Year and the district and regional Player of the Year.

Robinson led his team to four consecutive regional titles and two state runner-up finishes. He rushed for 3,046 yards on 371 carries, an 8.2 average, and 37 touchdowns, while passing for 2,409 yards in his career.

As a senior, he accounted for a huge portion of the team's total offense, passing for 1,056 yards and rushing for 1,281 and scored 15 touchdowns. He was two-year team captain, who totaled 211 career tackles, 18 interceptions and 13 sacks as a safety. He also participated in the sprints for the track and field squad.

== College career ==
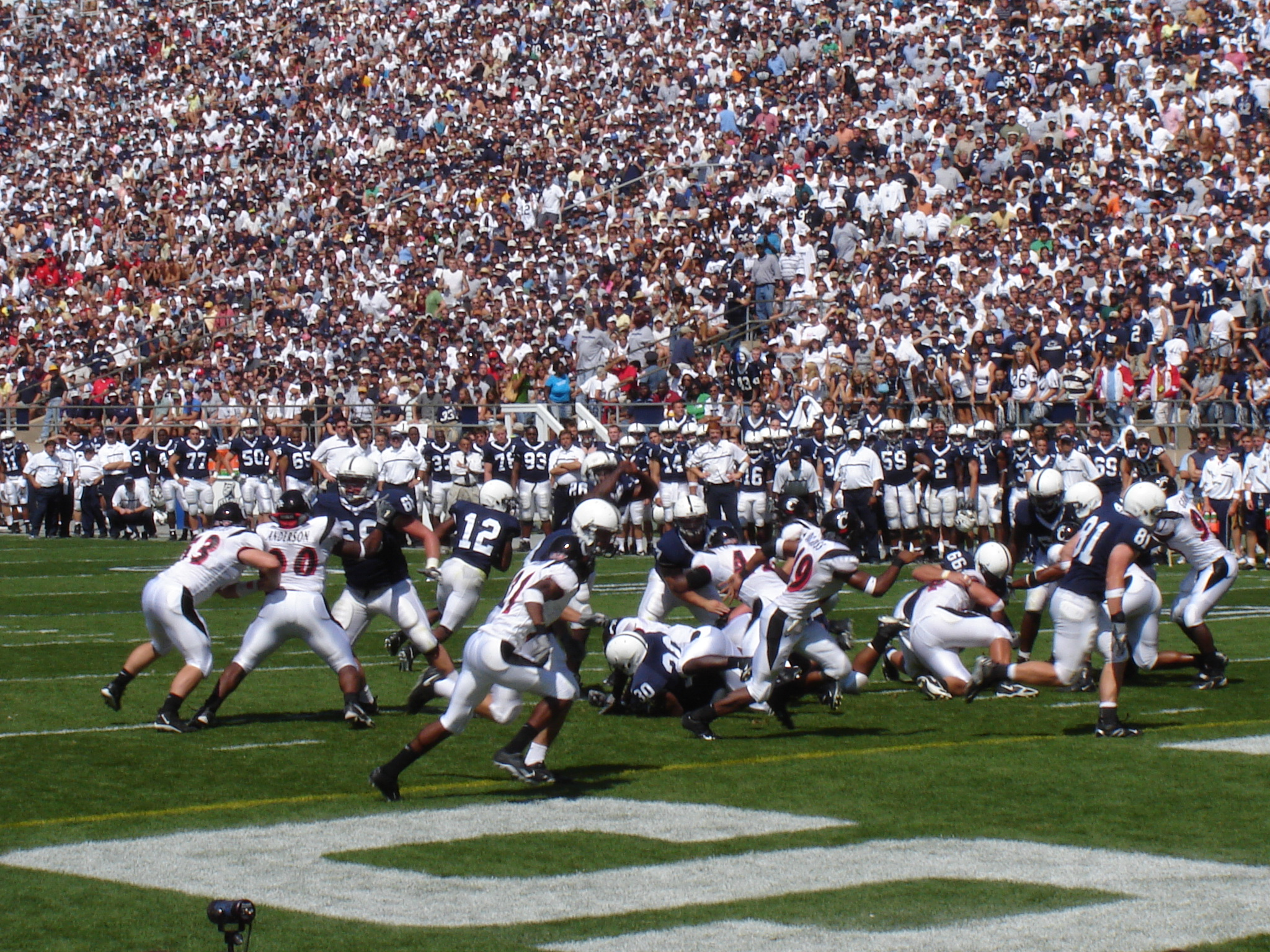
Number 12 Michael Robinson breaks left during the 2005 Penn State football game versus the University of Cincinnati at Beaver Stadium.

In 2002 with the Nittany Lions, Robinson shifted around the offensive set from quarterback to running back, slot back, and split end to utilize his talents. He showed great running ability and helped spark the diversified Penn State offense. He started at tailback against Michigan and at slot back against Auburn in the Capital One Bowl. Robinson was Penn State's second leading rusher in 2002 with 263 yards and six touchdowns on 50 carries. He caught nine passes for 44 yards.

In 2003, Robinson started eight games—three at quarterback and five at tailback. He completed 62-of-138 passes for 892 yards, five touchdowns, and five interceptions and finished second on the team with 396 yards and three scores on 107 carries.

In 2004, Robinson again started eight games. He was second on the team with 33 receptions for 485 yards (14.7 avg) and three touchdowns. He completed 14-of-39 passes for 170 yards, a touchdown, and five interceptions. He was third on the squad with 172 yards on 49 carries.

In 2005, Robinson compiled the best numbers of his college career. He was named Big Ten Conference Offensive Player of the Year by the league's coaches and was a consensus second-team All-Big Ten choice. He was named to the Maxwell Award watch list and was a semi-finalist for the Davey O'Brien Award, given to the nation's top passer. He completed 162 of 311 passes (52.1%) for 2,350 yards, seventeen touchdowns and ten interceptions. His 2,350 passing yards at the time ranked fifth on the school season-record list, topped only by Zack Mills (2,417 in 2002), Tony Sacca (2,488 in 1991), Anthony Morelli (2,651 in 2007) and Kerry Collins (2,679 in 1994). He was second on the team with 163 carries for 806 yards (4.9 avg) and eleven touchdowns, becoming the first player in school history to throw for over 2,000 yards and rush for over 500 yards in the same season. His 806 rushing yards set a school season-record for quarterbacks and he became the first quarterback in Penn State history to run for at least ten touchdowns in a season. His 28 touchdowns (17 passing, 11 rushing) was one shy of the school season-record of 29 (26 rushing, 3 catching) by Lydell Mitchell in 1971. Robinson also became the first Nittany Lion to throw three touchdown passes in three separate games during the same season since Todd Blackledge in 1982.

Robinson captained the 2005 team, one of Penn State's most competitive teams in years, winning the Big Ten championship and the Orange Bowl over the Florida State Seminoles in a gut-wrenching triple-overtime victory. He finished fifth in Heisman voting.

Robinson earned a Bachelor of Arts in advertising/public relations from Penn State University in three years, graduating in December 2004, and earned a second B.A. in journalism in December 2005. He was named Academic All-Big Ten three times.

=== Statistics ===
Season	Team	Passing								Rushing			
Season	Team	Cmp	Att	Pct	Yds	Y/A	TD	Int	Rtg	Att	Yds	Avg	TD
2002	Penn State	10	17	58.8	119	7.0	0	1	105.9	50	263	5.3	6
2003	Penn State	62	138	44.9	892	6.5	5	5	103.9	107	396	3.7	3
2004	Penn State	14	39	35.9	170	4.4	1	5	55.3	49	172	3.5	0
2005	Penn State	162	311	52.1	2,350	7.6	17	10	127.2	163	806	4.9	11
Career		248	505	49.1	3,531	7.0	23	21	114.6	369	1,637	4.4	20

== Professional career ==
Pre-draft measurables
Height	Weight	Arm length	Hand span	40-yard dash	20-yard shuttle	Three-cone drill	Vertical jump	Broad jump	Bench press
6 ft 1 3/8 in (1.86 m)	227 lb (103 kg)	29 7/8 in (0.76 m)	9 1/4 in (0.23 m)	4.57 s	4.41 s	6.95 s	33.0 in (0.84 m)	9 ft 11 in (3.02 m)	12 reps
All values from NFL Combine/Pro Day

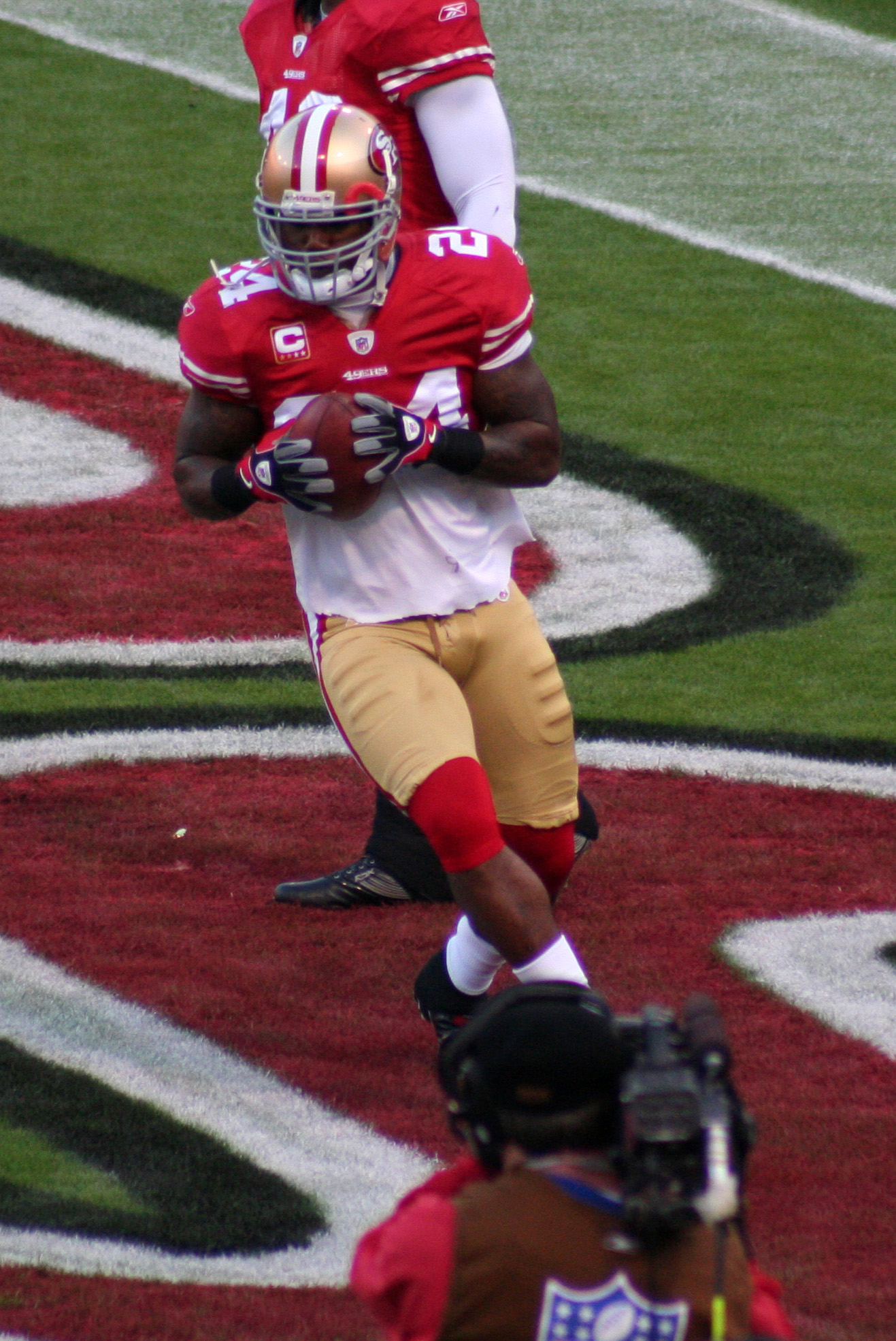
Robinson with the 49ers in 2009

=== San Francisco 49ers ===
Robinson was selected in the fourth round of the 2006 NFL draft by the San Francisco 49ers. The 49ers converted him into a running back. 49ers head coach Mike Nolan was immediately impressed with Robinson's attitude and toughness during training camp. After a solid preseason, Robinson rose up to the number two running back position behind Frank Gore on the depth chart. Robinson scored his first and second career touchdowns against the Philadelphia Eagles and Robinson knocked veteran pro-bowl safety Brian Dawkins out of the game after running him over before his second touchdown of the game. Then, in week 3, Mike Nolan indicated that he intended to use Robinson more often in goal line situations. Despite Nolan's statement, Robinson's playing time actually would decrease over the course of the season, and he did not score another touchdown. He finished the year with 38 carries for 116 yards, 9 receptions for 47 yards, and 2 touchdowns.

On February 28, 2008, the 49ers gave Robinson a three-year contract extension.

Midway through the 2008 season, Robinson took over as the 49ers' starting fullback after teammate Zak Keasey suffered a season-ending tear in his biceps.

=== Seattle Seahawks ===
Robinson was released by the 49ers on September 3, 2010, at the end of the 2010 preseason. He was signed on September 6, 2010, by the Seattle Seahawks at the urging of first-year assistant special teams coach and former 49ers' player, Jeff Ulbrich, who had been Robinson's teammate for the previous four seasons.

On December 12, 2011, against the St. Louis Rams, Robinson returned his first career special teams touchdown on a blocked punt.

On January 19, 2012, Robinson made his first and only career Pro Bowl as an alternate, starting at fullback for the injured John Kuhn.

On August 30, 2013, Robinson was released by the Seahawks during the final cuts, after the use of a prescription medication shut down his kidney and liver and caused him to lose 30 pounds. On October 22, the Seahawks re-signed him to a one-year deal after his health improved.

On February 2, 2014, Robinson caught a pass for seven yards in Super Bowl XLVIII en route to a 43–8 win over the favored Denver Broncos. It would be the last game of his career as he retired after the game.

== Post-football career ==
After retirement, Robinson became an analyst for the NFL Network. Robinson guest-starred as himself in a couple of episodes on The Young and the Restless, where he meets with Victor Newman. Robinson also co-hosts Da Get Got Pod with his former teammate, Marshawn Lynch.
