= Bryant Johnson =

American football player (born 1981)

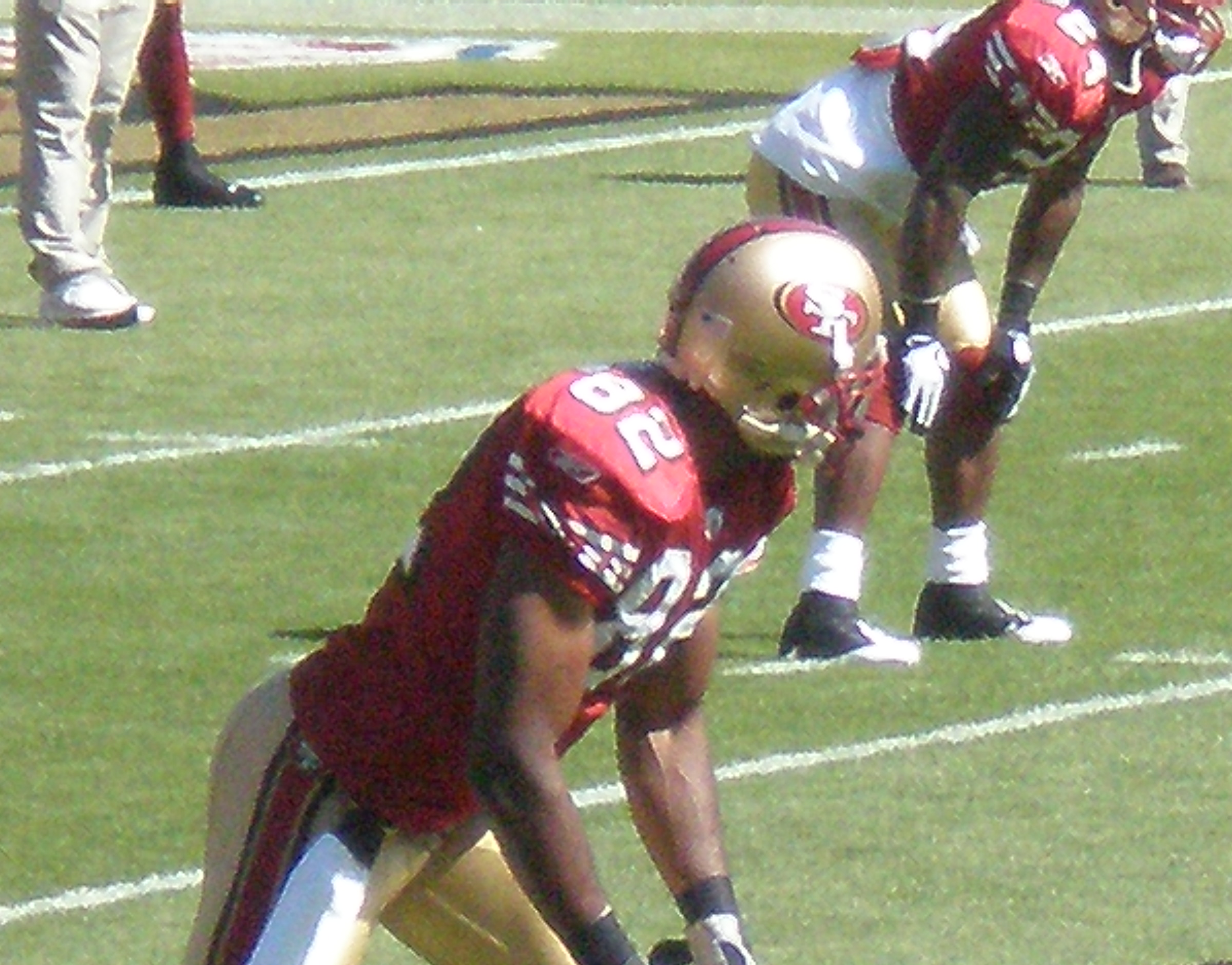
- Johnson with the San Francisco 49ers in 2008

No. 83, 80, 82, 89
- Position: Wide receiver

Personal information
- Born: March 7, 1981 (age 45); Baltimore, Maryland, U.S.
- Listed height: 6 ft 3 in (1.91 m)
- Listed weight: 212 lb (96 kg)

Career information
- High school: Baltimore City College
- College: Penn State (1999–2002)
- NFL draft: 2003: 1st round, 17th overall pick

Career history
- Arizona Cardinals (2003–2007); San Francisco 49ers (2008); Detroit Lions (2009–2010); Houston Texans (2011)

Awards and highlights
- First-team All-Big Ten (2002)

Career NFL statistics
- Receptions: 314
- Receiving yards: 3,938
- Receiving touchdowns: 16
- Stats at Pro Football Reference

Bryant Andrew Johnson (born March 7, 1981) is an American former professional football player who was a wide receiver who played in the National Football League (NFL). He was selected by the Arizona Cardinals 17th overall in the 2003 NFL draft and also played for the San Francisco 49ers, Detroit Lions, and Houston Texans. He played college football for the Penn State Nittany Lions.

== Early life ==
Johnson attended Baltimore City College high school, excelling at football, basketball, and track. He was selected first-team all-state and the 1998 Baltimore Touchdown Club's offensive player-of-the-year from the Knight's football team, Johnson also anchored a winning relay team at the Penn Relays for the school's track team.

== College career ==
Johnson was a star wide receiver for Penn State, starting his final two years. He was the sixth player in PSU history to catch more than 100 career passes, and finished second all-time with 2,008 career receiving yards.

Johnson earned a Bachelor of Arts in sociology from Penn State University in 2005.

== Professional career ==
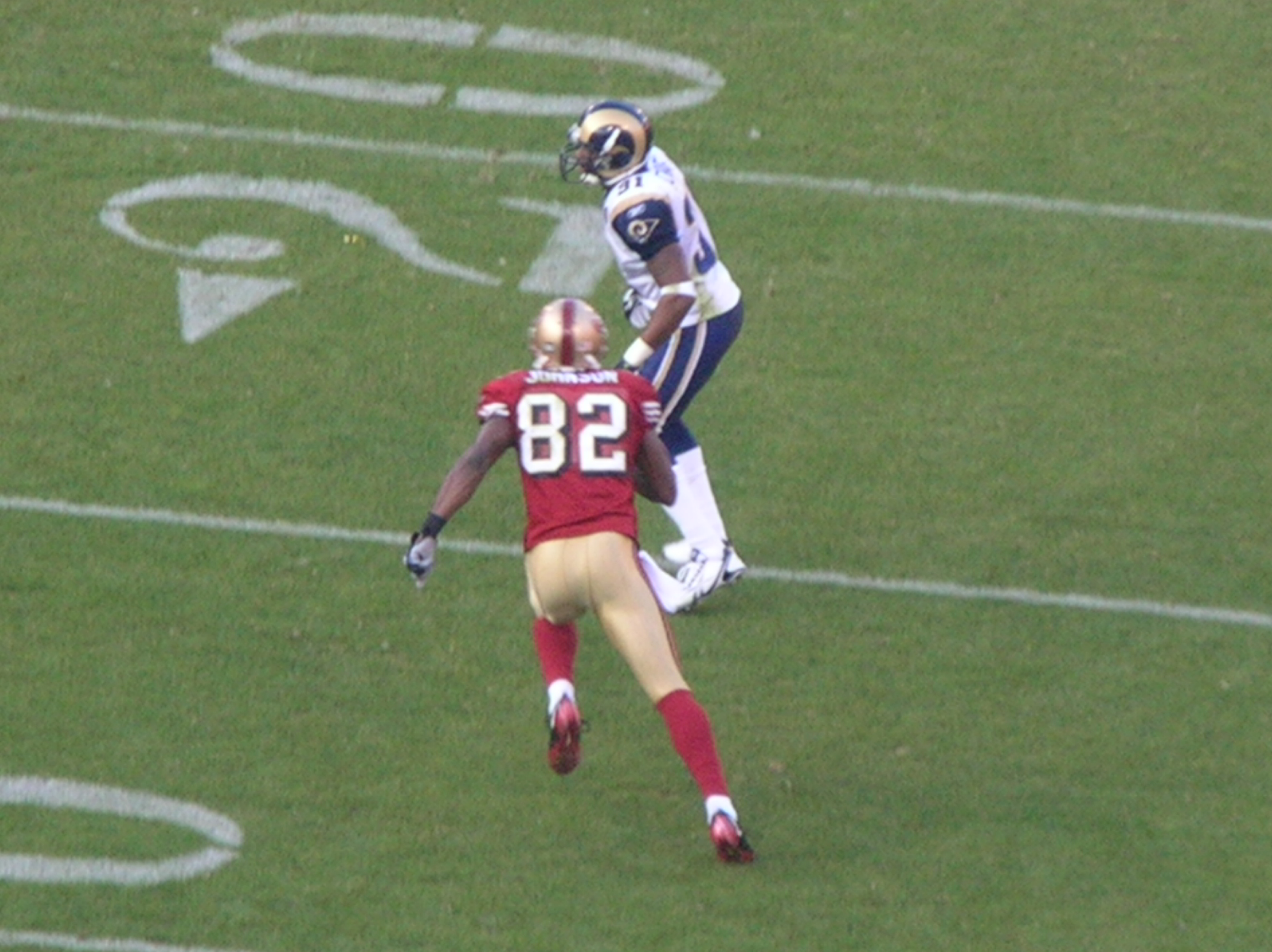
Johnson is matched up against St. Louis Rams cornerback Jason Craft during a game on November 16, 2008.

=== Arizona Cardinals ===
Johnson played three years predominantly as the Cardinals' third option receiver, playing mainly out of the slot receiver role, due to Anquan Boldin and Larry Fitzgerald being higher on the depth chart. His 35 catches in 2003 was the third most receptions for a rookie (his teammate Anquan Boldin had the most receptions for a rookie that year). In his 5-year career with the Cardinals he caught 210 passes for 2675 yards and 9 touchdowns.

Johnson scored the inaugural touchdown at University of Phoenix Stadium, a 5-yard reception from Kurt Warner in the Arizona Cardinals preseason game on August 12, 2006.

=== San Francisco 49ers ===
Johnson signed a one-year deal with the San Francisco 49ers on March 14, 2008. He had 45 receptions for 546 yards and three touchdowns the 2008 season, his fifth straight season with 40 or more receptions. In his tenure with the 49ers, he changed his jersey number from 80 to 82 in respect of retired 49ers WR Jerry Rice, whose jersey number 80 was retired in his honor.

=== Detroit Lions ===
On February 28, 2009, Johnson signed a 3-year $9 million deal with the Detroit Lions. He was released on July 28, 2011.

=== Houston Texans ===
Johnson signed with the Houston Texans on August 29, 2011.

Johnson re-signed with the Texans on July 26, 2012. On August 27, he was released by the team.

== Career statistics ==
=== NFL ===
Year	Team	Games		Receiving							Rushing							Punt returns					Kickoff returns				
Year	Team	GP	GS	Rec	Yds	Avg	Y/G	Lng	TD	FD	Att	Yds	Avg	Y/G	Lng	TD	FD	Ret	Yds	Avg	Lng	TD	Ret	Yds	Avg	Lng	TD
2003	ARZ	37	8	35	438	12.5	29.2	54	1	20	–	–	–	–	–	–	–	1	3	3.0	3	0	–	–	–	–	–
2004	ARZ	16	11	49	537	11.0	33.6	40	1	29	2	-6	-3.0	-0.4	1	0	0	–	–	–	–	–	6	135	22.5	47	0
2005	ARZ	14	4	40	432	10.8	30.9	41	1	25	1	0	0.0	0.0	0	0	0	1	9	9.0	9	0	2	45	22.5	24	0
2006	ARZ	16	8	40	740	18.5	46.3	58	4	30	1	-3	-3.0	-0.2	-3	0	0	1	0	0.0	0	0	2	29	14.5	16	0
2007	ARZ	16	8	46	528	11.5	33.0	30	2	33	–	–	–	–	–	–	–	–	–	–	–	–	–	–	–	–	–
2008	SF	16	12	45	546	12.1	34.1	42	3	28	–	–	–	–	–	–	–	–	–	–	–	–	–	–	–	–	–
2009	DET	16	16	35	417	11.9	26.1	36	3	23	–	–	–	–	–	–	–	–	–	–	–	–	–	–	–	–	–
2010	DET	14	7	18	210	11.7	15.0	24	0	11	–	–	–	–	–	–	–	–	–	–	–	–	–	–	–	–	–
2011	HOU	16	0	6	90	15.0	5.6	40	0	4	1	1	1.0	0.1	1	0	0	–	–	–	–	–	–	–	–	–	–
Career		139	74	314	3,938	12.5	28.3	58	16	203	5	-8	-1.6	-0.1	1	0	0	3	12	4.0	9	0	10	209	20.9	47	0

=== College ===
Year	Team	GP	Receiving			
Year	Team	GP	Rec	Yds	Avg	TD
1999	Penn State	12	7	140	20.0	2
2000	Penn State	11	4	85	21.3	1
2001	Penn State	11	51	866	17.0	3
2002	Penn State	13	48	917	19.1	4
Career		47	110	2,008	18.3	10
