= 2003 Capital One Bowl =

American college football game

Penn State Nittany Lions	Auburn Tigers
(9–3)	(8–4)
Big Ten	SEC
9	13
Head coach: Joe Paterno	Head coach: Tommy Tuberville
AP / Coaches / BCS; 10 / 10 / 12	AP / Coaches / BCS; 19 / 22 / NR
	1	2	3	4	Total
Penn State	3	3	0	3	9
Auburn	0	0	7	6	13
- Date: January 1, 2003
- Season: 2002
- Stadium: Florida Citrus Bowl
- Location: Orlando, Florida
- MVP: Ronnie Brown
- Favorite: Penn State by 7.5
- Referee: Jack Cramer (Big East)
- Attendance: 66,334

United States TV coverage
- Network: ABC
- Announcers: Sean McDonough, David Norrie

The 2003 Capital One Bowl was a post-season college football bowl game between the Penn State Nittany Lions and the Auburn Tigers on January 1, 2003, at the Citrus Bowl in Orlando, Florida. Auburn won the game 13–9; Auburn running back Ronnie Brown was the game's MVP, rushing for 184 yards and two touchdowns.
