= Enoch DeMar =

American football player (born 1980)

No. 70
- Position: Guard/Offensive tackle

Personal information
- Born: September 7, 1980 (age 46); Indianapolis, Indiana, U.S.
- Listed height: 6 ft 4 in (1.93 m)
- Listed weight: 317 lb (144 kg)

Career information
- High school: Arsenal Tech (Indianapolis)
- College: Indiana
- NFL draft: 2003: undrafted

Career history
- Cleveland Browns (2003–2004); New York Giants (2006)*
- * Offseason or practice squad member only

Awards and highlights
- Second-team All-Big Ten (2001)

Career NFL statistics
- Games played: 20
- Games started: 13
- Fumble recoveries: 1
- Stats at Pro Football Reference

Enoch DeMar (born September 7, 1980) is an American former professional football player who was an offensive lineman for two seasons with the Cleveland Browns of the National Football League (NFL). He played college football for the Indiana Hoosiers.

== Early life ==
DeMar attended Arsenal Technical High School in Indianapolis, Indiana, where he played football for the first time as a sophomore after having only played basketball. Playing the left tackle position, he was selected to the Indiana All-Star Classic as a senior. Recruiting analyst Tom Lemming called him "one of the Midwest's most underrated ballplayers and the state's top offensive line prospect."

== College career ==
DeMar played college football at Indiana University Bloomington, where he redshirted his first season with the Hoosiers in 1998. He earned the starting left guard position the following year after a back injury to senior Matt Snyder, and went on to start every game that season. DeMar was converted to a right tackle in 2000, and was the only returning starter on the offensive line. In 2001, he was moved to right guard. Finally, as a senior, DeMar played left tackle.

== Professional career ==
=== Cleveland Browns ===
After going undrafted in the 2003 NFL draft, DeMar signed a free agent contract with the Cleveland Browns. He was one of only four undrafted free agents to make the final 53-man roster. He played in five games, starting two, for the Browns during the 2003 season. DeMar appeared in 15 games, starting 11, the following year in 2004. He was waived by the Browns on September 3, 2005.

=== New York Giants ===
DeMar signed a reserve/future contract with the New York Giants on January 4, 2006. He was waived on March 22, 2006.
