= Andrew Ryland =

US international rugby union player (born 1981)

- Born: March 8, 1981 (age 45)
- Height: 6 ft 3 in (191 cm)
- Weight: 240 lb (109 kg)
- School: State College High School
- University: Pennsylvania State University

Rugby union career
- Position: Flanker
International career
Years	Team	Apps	(Points)
2005	United States	4	(0)

Andrew Ryland (born March 8, 1981) is an American former international rugby union player.

Raised in State College, Pennsylvania, Ryland grew up one of seven siblings, four of whom were adopted amongst the numerous foster kids that his family took in over the years. He was born with congenital defects in his right foot which left him with toes that do not touch the ground, for which he had to start wearing orthotics.

Ryland, a three-year football letterman at State College High School, was a walk-on Penn State linebacker, later awarded a grant by coach Joe Paterno. His father Terry coached the Penn State rugby team and he earned All-American honours playing under him in 2004. He was a flanker on the U.S. national team in 2005, gaining four caps.

== See also ==
- List of United States national rugby union players
