= Tony Johnson (wide receiver) =

American football player (born 1982)

Current position
- Title: Senior advisor / analyst
- Team: Ohio State

Biographical details
- Born: September 19, 1983 (age 43)
- Education: Penn State

Playing career
- 2000–2003: Penn State
- Position: Wide receiver

Coaching career (HC unless noted)
- 2024–present: Ohio State (Analyst)

Accomplishments and honors

Championships
- CFP national champion (2024)

Tony Johnson (born March 12, 1982) is a current American football coach for the Ohio State Buckeyes. He played wide receiver collegiately at Penn State from 2000 to 2003. Entering the 2008 season, he was ranked 10th all time in receptions for the Nittany Lions with 107, and 9th in receiving yards with 1,702. Johnson was listed at 5'11, 209 lbs. and wore number 11. His older brother is former NFL running back Larry Johnson. Tony was also Larry's manager.

Johnson attended State College Area High School in State College, Pennsylvania, and was recruited by several college teams. Originally a quarterback and running back in high school, he converted to wide receiver upon committing to the Nittany Lions.

From 2001 to 2002, Johnson served as the Nittany Lions' second-choice receiver, playing alongside Bryant Johnson. In 2002, he had three receiving touchdowns, caught 34 passes, and gained 549 receiving yards. In 2003, when he was a senior at Penn State, Johnson was charged with DUI. He was suspended for two games by the team after this incident. Following his return, Johnson had three touchdowns in a game against Indiana.

== Personal life ==
Tony married his wife, Karin Grapp-Johnson, in the summer of 2009. They have three children, two boys and a girl. He resides in Ohio. Tony is the second of three children, born to Christine and Larry Johnson Sr. His father, Larry Johnson Sr., is a former high school coach, and the current defensive line coach at The Ohio State University.

He worked for Fischer Homes in Ohio for ten years prior to starting at Ohio State and served on the coaching staff at Olentangy Berkshire Middle School for two years.
