= Anwar Phillips =

American football player (born 1982)

No. 24
- Position: Cornerback

Personal information
- Born: October 25, 1982 (age 44); St. Petersburg, Florida, U.S.
- Listed height: 6 ft 1 in (1.85 m)
- Listed weight: 185 lb (84 kg)

Career information
- College: Penn State
- NFL draft: 2006: undrafted

Career history
- New Orleans Saints (2006–2008)*; Baltimore Ravens (2008)
- * Offseason or practice squad member only
- Stats at Pro Football Reference

Anwar M.S. Phillips (born October 25, 1982) is an American former professional football player who was a cornerback in the National Football League (NFL). He played college football for the Penn State Nittany Lions and was signed by the New Orleans Saints as an undrafted free agent in 2006. Phillips has also played for the Baltimore Ravens.

== Early life ==
Phillips attended Northwest High School in Germantown, Maryland. He was named to The Washington Post'' All-League squad as a wide receiver in 2000 and 2001.

== College career ==
Phillips was a two-year starter and was an All-Big Ten selection at Penn State University. He helped the Nittany Lions lead the conference in pass efficiency defense in 2005, and made 104 tackles and seven interceptions in his collegiate career. There he earned a Bachelor of Science in labor and industrial relations in December 2005.

== Professional career ==
=== New Orleans Saints ===
Phillips signed as an undrafted free agent with the New Orleans Saints following the 2006 NFL draft. He saw playing time in 4 games during the preseason. Phillips began the season on the practice squad, but was promoted to the active roster mid-season. He was released at the end of training camp the following season.

=== Baltimore Ravens ===
Phillips signed as a free agent with the Baltimore Ravens on July 23, 2008. He spent the first half of the 2008 season on the practice squad before being promoted to active roster on November 1, 2008. He would play in the Ravens' week 9 win over Cleveland. Phillips was re-signed to a one-year future contract at the conclusion of the season. He was waived on June 18, 2009.
