= Rich Gardner =

American football player (born 1981)

No. 23, 25, 30
- Position: Cornerback

Personal information
- Born: February 1, 1981 (age 45); Carbondale, Illinois, U.S.
- Listed height: 5 ft 10 in (1.78 m)
- Listed weight: 194 lb (88 kg)

Career information
- High school: Chicago (IL) Hales Franciscan
- College: Penn State
- NFL draft: 2004: 3rd round, 92nd overall pick

Career history
- Tennessee Titans (2004–2005); Seattle Seahawks (2006–2007); Team Michigan (2007–2010)

Career NFL statistics
- Tackles: 24
- Interceptions: 1
- Passes defended: 1
- Stats at Pro Football Reference

Richard James Gardner (born February 1, 1981) is an American former professional football player. He last played defensive back for Kiel Baltic Hurricanes of the German Football League (GFL). A Penn State University Football graduate and third round draft pick, he played cornerback for three seasons in the National Football League (NFL) for the Tennessee Titans from 2004 to 2005, and Seattle Seahawks in 2006.

Coming to Penn State as a walk-on in 1999, Gardner started every game in his final two seasons. He totaled 141 tackles, two fumble recoveries, 15 pass deflections and three interceptions for 109 yards and two touchdowns. He was named a third-team All-American his senior year and honorable mention All-Big Ten his senior and junior years. He graduated from Penn State with a Bachelor of Arts in economics in December 2003.

== Professional career ==
A third round draft pick (#92 overall) for the Titans in 2004, the 5'10", 195 lb. Gardner made 24 tackles and an interception in his two seasons there, playing cornerback and on special teams. He was waived by the Titans on September 4, 2006. He signed with the Seahawks in week 17 of the 2006 season and was waived by the team on July 11, 2007.

== Personal life ==
Currently he resides in Gary, Indiana with his wife and children. In 2017 he founded a nonprofit with his wife Maroon Village, where they work with Student Athletes building resilience on and off the playing field through performance training and practices such as yoga, meditation and breathwork.
