= Fran Ganter =

College football coach

Biographical details
- Born: Bethel Park, Pennsylvania, U.S.

Playing career
- 1967–1970: Penn State
- Position: Running back

Coaching career (HC unless noted)
- 1972: Penn State (GA)
- 1978-1983: Penn State (RB/K)
- 1984–1999: Penn State (OC)
- 2000–2003: Penn State (AHC/OC)

Administrative career (AD unless noted)
- 2004–2013: Penn State (AAD)

Accomplishments and honors

Awards
- Pennsylvania Sports Hall of Fame (2010)

Fran Ganter is an American former college football coach and former player. He won two national championships with Penn State and served in numerous coaching positions for the team.

== Playing career ==
Prior to his coaching career, Ganter played running back at Penn State from 1967 to 1970.

== Coaching career ==
Ganter served as the Penn State Nittany Lions offensive coordinator under Joe Paterno from 1984 to 2003. In 2000, he was named assistant head coach. Ganter was a member of Penn States 1982 and 1986 national championship teams.

Ganters 1994 offense led the nation in yards per game (520.2) and points per game (47.8). After that season, he was offered the Michigan State Spartans head coaching job, but declined the offer and returned to Penn State.

From 2004 to 2013, Ganter served as Penn State's Associate athletic director. In February 2013, he announced his retirement after 46 years associated with Penn State's football program.
