= Matt Kranchick =

American football player (born 1979)

No. 88, 83
- Position: Tight end

Personal information
- Born: December 13, 1979 (age 46); Carlisle, Pennsylvania, U.S.
- Listed height: 6 ft 7 in (2.01 m)
- Listed weight: 260 lb (118 kg)

Career information
- High school: Mercersburg Academy (Mercersburg, Pennsylvania)
- College: Penn State
- NFL draft: 2004: 6th round, 194th overall pick

Career history
- Pittsburgh Steelers (2004–2005); New York Giants (2005–2006); Tampa Bay Buccaneers (2006)*; New England Patriots (2006–2007)*
- * Offseason or practice squad member only

Career NFL statistics
- Receptions: 1
- Receiving yards: 6
- Stats at Pro Football Reference

Matthew Alan Kranchick (born December 13, 1979) is an American former professional football player who was a tight end in the National Football League (NFL). He was selected by the Pittsburgh Steelers in the 2004 NFL draft. He played college football for the Penn State Nittany Lions.

== Early life ==
Kranchick played quarterback, wide receiver and defensive end at Trinity High School in Camp Hill, Pennsylvania, and at Mercersburg Academy in Mercersburg, Pennsylvania.

== College career ==
Kranchick played collegiately at Penn State University, where he earned a Bachelor of Science in business administration in 2002. During his two years at Penn State, Kranchick caught 24 passes for 352 receiving yards and 1 touchdown.

Kranchick’s 73-yard pass reception from Michael Robinson in 2003 stands as the longest reception by a tight end in Penn State football history.

== Professional career ==
=== Pittsburgh Steelers ===
Kranchick was selected in the sixth round with the 194th overall pick by the Pittsburgh Steelers in the 2004 NFL draft.

Kranchick played in two games during the 2004 NFL season, but did not record any stats.

During the 2005 NFL season, Krachick played 4 games for the Steelers, catching 1 pass for 6 yards before being released by the team.

=== New York Giants ===
The New York Giants signed Kranchick on December 20, 2005. He played in 2 games recording no stats. Kranchick was released on June 8, 2006.

=== Tampa Bay Buccaneers ===
Kranchick signed with the Tampa Bay Buccaneers on June 29, 2006. He was released on August 29, 2006.

=== New England Patriots ===
The New England Patriots signed Kranchick to their Practice Squad on December 15, 2006. He was released on August 12, 2007.
