= Jimmy Kennedy (American football) =

American football player (born 1979)

No. 73, 72, 71
- Position: Defensive tackle

Personal information
- Born: November 15, 1979 (age 47); Yonkers, New York, U.S.
- Listed height: 6 ft 4 in (1.93 m)
- Listed weight: 323 lb (147 kg)

Career information
- High school: Roosevelt (Yonkers)
- College: Penn State
- NFL draft: 2003: 1st round, 12th overall pick

Career history
- St. Louis Rams (2003–2006); Denver Broncos (2007)*; Chicago Bears (2007); Jacksonville Jaguars (2008); Minnesota Vikings (2008–2010); New York Giants (2011)
- * Offseason or practice squad member only

Awards and highlights
- Super Bowl champion (XLVI); First-team All-American (2002); Big Ten Defensive Lineman of the Year (2002); 2× First-team All-Big Ten (2001, 2002)

Career NFL statistics
- Total tackles: 145
- Sacks: 8.5
- Forced fumbles: 2
- Fumble recoveries: 2
- Stats at Pro Football Reference

Jimmy Wayne Kennedy (born November 15, 1979) is an American former professional football player who was a defensive tackle in the National Football League (NFL). He was selected by the St. Louis Rams 12th overall in the 2003 NFL draft. He played college football for the Penn State Nittany Lions. Kennedy was also a member of the Denver Broncos, Chicago Bears, Jacksonville Jaguars, Minnesota Vikings, and New York Giants. He won Super Bowl XLVI with the Giants against the New England Patriots.

== Early life ==
Kennedy attended Roosevelt High School in Yonkers, where he was a three-year starter on both offense and defense. Under Coach Tony DeMatteo, Kennedy earned All-American, All-city, All-conference, All-state, and team MVP honors. He also won a local High School Heisman trophy sponsored by the Downtown Athletic Club. In Kennedy's junior season, Roosevelt High was 12–0 and won the state championship. In his three years as a starter the team was 30–3. After his senior season of 1998 Kennedy played in the Governor's Bowl, in which the best prep players of New York played the best high school players in New Jersey.

== College career ==
A four-year starter at Penn State University, Kennedy was named the 2002 Big Ten Defensive Lineman-of-the-Year and was a two-time first-team All-Big Ten selection. A semi-finalist for the Lombardi Award, Kennedy finished his career with 213 tackles, 14 sacks, and 39 tackles-for-loss. He earned a Bachelor of Science in rehabilitation services in 2002.

In his freshman season, Kennedy played in 12 games, starting 6, and recorded 33 tackles and batted away 4 passes. In 2000, as a sophomore, Kennedy started all 11 games for Penn State and recorded 42 tackles and 6 sacks. As a junior, in 2001, he made 51 tackles and logged 1.5 sacks and was voted All-Big Ten for the first time.

As a senior in 2002, Kennedy was named a First-team All-American by The Sporting News, and Walter Camp Football Foundation, The NFL Draft Report, and third-team honors from the Associated Press. He recorded 87 tackles, 5.5 sacks and batted away 3 passes in 2002.

== Professional career ==
Pre-draft measurables
Height	Weight	40-yard dash	20-yard shuttle	Three-cone drill	Vertical jump	Broad jump	Bench press	Wonderlic
6 ft 4 in (1.93 m)	323 lb (147 kg)	5.2 s	4.721 s	8.069 s	30.5 in (0.77 m)	8 ft 4 in (2.54 m)	24 reps	20
All values from Penn State Pro Day except Wonderlic (NFL Combine)

=== St. Louis Rams ===
The 6'4", 320 lb. defensive tackle was the first round pick (#12 overall) of the St. Louis Rams in the 2003 NFL Draft. On July 30, 2003, Kennedy signed a 5-year $9 million contract that included a $5 million signing bonus. With two defensive tackles, Ryan Pickett and Damione Lewis, taken in 2001, Kennedy played 13 games but did not make a start his rookie season, and made one tackle, one assist, and one pass batted.

The following year, Kennedy played in the final nine games of the season, starting 5 of them. During this time, he posted 16 tackles and one pass defensed. Kennedy started both postseason games where he registered nine tackles and one sack. On January 8, 2005, he recorded two tackles and one sack. He tracked down Matt Hasselbeck for a six-yard loss in the last minute of the fourth quarter of the Rams’ 27–20 win.

By 2005, Kennedy had earned a spot as the Rams' nose tackle, played in 15 games and started the first nine games of the season. With a chance to finally play, Kennedy made a respectable 33 tackles, 3 sacks, and one forced fumble. On September 18, 2005, he posted four tackles with two sacks on his former teammate Kurt Warner, along with first career forced fumble.

In 2006 Kennedy started all 16 games at nose tackle for the Rams for the first time in his career and recorded 39 tackles, one sack, one pass defensed, one forced fumble and two fumble recoveries.

=== Denver Broncos ===
Kennedy was traded to the Denver Broncos on June 8, 2007, for a 6th round pick in the 2008 NFL draft. On September 1, 2007, the Broncos released him.

=== Chicago Bears ===
On December 11, 2007, the Chicago Bears signed Kennedy and he played in the final three games of the 2007 season, making three tackles. The Bears declined to match the Jacksonville Jaguars's offer to Kennedy in the offseason.

=== Jacksonville Jaguars ===
Kennedy signed a one-year, $655,000 contract with the Jacksonville Jaguars on March 4, 2008. He played six games with the Jaguars, making 5 tackles and a sack before being waived mid-season on November 24, 2008.

=== Minnesota Vikings ===
The Minnesota Vikings signed Kennedy on December 3, 2008, to help fill the void created when Pro Bowl defensive tackles Pat Williams and Kevin Williams were suspended, but the NFL could not enforce their punishment after local judges stalled the matter indefinitely. He had a solid year as the backup in the 2009 season recording 3 sacks in limited playing time. He became a free agent at the conclusion of the 2008 and 2009 season, but was re-signed both years. On July 28, 2011, he was released.

=== New York Giants ===
The New York Giants signed Kennedy on August 23, 2011. After recording four tackles in the first five weeks of the season, Kennedy was suspended four games for violating the league's policy on performance-enhancing drugs on October 11. The Giants went on to win Super Bowl XLVI, earning Kennedy his first ring.

=== NFL statistics ===
Year	Team	GP	COMB	TOTAL	AST	SACK	FF	FR	FR YDS	INT	IR YDS	AVG IR	LNG	TD	PD
2003	STL	13	2	1	1	0.0	0	0	0	0	0	0	0	0	0
2004	STL	9	16	13	3	0.0	0	0	0	0	0	0	0	0	0
2005	STL	15	33	23	10	3.0	1	0	0	0	0	0	0	0	3
2006	STL	16	39	30	9	1.0	0	2	0	0	0	0	0	0	1
2007	CHI	3	2	0	2	0.0	0	0	0	0	0	0	0	0	0
2008	JAX	6	6	5	1	1.0	0	0	0	0	0	0	0	0	0
2008	MIN	2	1	1	0	0.0	0	0	0	0	0	0	0	0	0
2009	MIN	13	18	15	3	3.0	0	0	0	0	0	0	0	0	1
2010	MIN	9	8	5	3	0.5	0	0	0	0	0	0	0	0	0
2011	NYG	6	4	2	2	0.0	0	0	0	0	0	0	0	0	0
Career		92	129	95	34	8.5	1	2	0	0	0	0	0	0	5

== Post-NFL life ==
Kennedy was the subject of an article in The New York Times about racist practices at the banking firm JPMorgan Chase. In 2018, Kennedy attempted to deposit money earned from his football career at a local JPMorgan bank after talks with an employee who made a good impression on him, Ricardo Peters. Kennedy's ample wealth would have qualified him under normal circumstances as a "private client" who would qualify for a variety of perks. However, Peters, who is black, was fired from the bank for unclear and disputed reasons, and Kennedy's application buried. Kennedy recorded later conversations with the replacement employee at JPMorgan; in them, the new employee indicated that the regional manager was afraid of talking with a large black man like Kennedy, and that the coveted private client status was unlikely to come to Kennedy despite his large deposit. In addition, Ricardo Peters said that JPMorgan sometimes turned away black people with large savings; in one incident, Peters was directly discouraged by his boss from taking on as a client a black woman who had suddenly come into a large inheritance.
