= Michael Haynes (defensive lineman) =

American football player (born 1980)

No. 97
- Position: Defensive end

Personal information
- Born: September 13, 1980 (age 46); Brooklyn, New York, U.S.
- Listed height: 6 ft 4 in (1.93 m)
- Listed weight: 247 lb (112 kg)

Career information
- High school: Northern Burlington County Regional (Mansfield Township, New Jersey)
- College: Penn State
- NFL draft: 2003: 1st round, 14th overall pick

Career history
- Chicago Bears (2003–2005); New Orleans Saints (2006); New York Jets (2007)*
- * Offseason or practice squad member only

Awards and highlights
- First-team All-American (2002); Big Ten Co-Defensive Player of the Year (2002); First Team All-Big Ten (2002)

Career NFL statistics
- Total tackles: 79
- Sacks: 5.5
- Forced fumbles: 1
- Interceptions: 1
- Interception yards: 45
- Defensive touchdowns: 1
- Stats at Pro Football Reference

Michael Washington Augustis Haynes Jr. (born September 13, 1980) is an American former professional football player who was a defensive end in the National Football League (NFL). He played college football for the Penn State Nittany Lions and was selected by the Chicago Bears in the first round of the 2003 NFL draft.

== Professional career ==
Pre-draft measurables
Height	Weight	Arm length	Hand span	40-yard dash	10-yard split	20-yard split	Vertical jump	Broad jump	Bench press
6 ft 3 in (1.91 m)	281 lb (127 kg)	33 in (0.84 m)	9 1/2 in (0.24 m)	4.86 s	1.61 s	2.82 s	30 1/2 in (0.77 m)	9 ft 1 in (2.77 m)	23 reps
All values from NFL Combine.

=== Chicago Bears ===
Haynes was selected in the first round with the 14th overall pick of the 2003 NFL draft out of Penn State by the Chicago Bears. Haynes was the first player selected by the Bears with their two first round draft picks in 2003. The Bears used their second first round pick, 22nd overall of the 2003 NFL Draft, to select quarterback Rex Grossman. Following the Bears' trade for Adewale Ogunleye, Haynes struggled to see the field for the remainder of his time in Chicago. Haynes was released from the Bears as part of the 2006 roster cutdown.

=== New Orleans Saints ===
He was signed by the New Orleans Saints and was declared inactive for one game before being released.

=== New York Jets ===
On August 31, 2007, Haynes signed with the New York Jets. On September 1, 2007, the Jets cut him.

== Personal life ==
He is the son of both Army and Air Force parents. He lived in many places around the world growing up including the Republic of Panama, where he was coached in football by head coach Louis Husted. While there, he attended Balboa High School. After his parents relocated to McGuire Air Force Base in New Jersey, Haynes enrolled at Northern Burlington County Regional High School. He played volleyball, basketball, track, and football. He has an older brother, Curtis and a younger brother, Leshawn.

Haynes earned a Bachelor of Science in agricultural sciences from Penn State in 2003.

Starting the 2025 season he is the current varsity defensive line football coach at Nease High School in Ponte Vedra, FL.
