= Zack Mills =

American football player and coach (born 1982)

Profile
- Position: Quarterback

Personal information
- Born: May 1, 1982 (age 44); Ijamsville, Maryland, U.S.
- Listed height: 6 ft 3 in (1.91 m)
- Listed weight: 205 lb (93 kg)

Career information
- College: Penn State
- NFL draft: 2005: undrafted

Career history
- Washington Redskins (2005)*
- * Offseason or practice squad member only

Zachary Eric Mills (born May 1, 1982) is an American former football quarterback. He was a four-year starter at Penn State.

== High school ==
Mills attended Urbana High School with Nate A. Foster in Frederick County, Maryland from 1996 to 2000, where he led the school's football team to consecutive 2A state championships in 1998 and 1999, going undefeated both years. In the course of his high school career he broke Maryland public school records both for passing yards (5,638) and touchdown passes (59) and won countless awards including first team All-CMC and first team All-Mid-Maryland. Mills was also a standout on the basketball team.

== College ==
As the quarterback of the Nittany Lions from 2001 to 2004, Mills led the team to the Capital One Bowl in the 2002 season. Mills was a three-time Davey O'Brien Award finalist and was presented with the 2004 Hall Foundation Award as Penn State's outstanding senior football player.

Mills holds many Penn State passing and total offense records: He finished his career with a school record 7,796 yards of total offense, 41 career touchdown passes (since broken by Daryll Clark, Matt McGloin, Christian Hackenberg, and Trace McSorley, and 16 career 200-yard passing games. Mills is the first Nittany Lion under head coach Joe Paterno to throw, catch, and run for a touchdown in a single game (in 2004 versus Akron). He wore jersey number 7.

He graduated in 2004 with a Bachelor of Science in Kinesiology.

== NFL ==
Mills spent the 2005 preseason in the Washington Redskins' training camp as an undrafted free agent, but was released before the season began. He pulled his hamstring early in camp and the injury prevented Mills from participating in most drills. He wore jersey number 14.

== Wilkes-Barre/Scranton Pioneers ==
Mills signed with the Wilkes-Barre/Scranton Pioneers of the af2, a minor league of the Arena Football League in the Spring of 2007 but left the team a few weeks later.

== Coaching ==
In 2006, Mills served as an assistant coach at Temple under first-year head coach (and fellow Penn State alumnus), Al Golden. He joined the coaching staff at The Haverford School in Haverford, Pennsylvania as quarterbacks coach in 2007, leaving the team after the 2010 season.
