= 2001 Michigan State Spartans football team =

American college football season

2001 Michigan State Spartans football

Silicon Valley Football Classic champion

Silicon Valley Football Classic, W 44–35 vs. Fresno State
- Conference: Big Ten Conference
- Record: 7–5 (3–5 Big Ten)
- Head coach: Bobby Williams (2nd season)
- Offensive coordinator: Morris Watts (11th season)
- Defensive coordinator: Bill Miller (3rd season)
- Home stadium: Spartan Stadium

2001 Big Ten Conference football standings
	Conf.			Overall
Team	W		L	W		L
No. 12 Illinois $	7	–	1	10	–	2
No. 20 Michigan	6	–	2	8	–	4
Ohio State	5	–	3	7	–	5
Iowa	4	–	4	7	–	5
Purdue	4	–	4	6	–	6
Penn State	4	–	4	5	–	6
Indiana	4	–	4	5	–	6
Michigan State	3	–	5	7	–	5
Wisconsin	3	–	5	5	–	7
Minnesota	2	–	6	4	–	7
Northwestern	2	–	6	4	–	7
$ – BCS representative as conference champion; Rankings from AP Poll

The 2001 Michigan State Spartans football team represented Michigan State University as a member of the Big Ten Conference during the 2001 NCAA Division I-A football season. Led by second-year head coach Bobby Williams, the Spartans compiled an overall record of 7–5 with a mark of 3–5 in conference play, tying for eighth place in the Big Ten. Michigan State was invited to the Silicon Valley Football Classic, where the Spartans defeated Fresno State. The team played home games at Spartan Stadium in East Lansing, Michigan.

The controversial final play of the home game against Michigan on November 3 led to a change in the official timekeeping policy of the Big Ten Conference. Beginning in 2002, a neutral official appointed by the Big Ten keeps track of the game time on the field.

== Schedule ==
Date	Time	Opponent	Rank	Site	TV	Result	Attendance	Source
September 8	1:00 p.m.	Central Michigan*		Spartan Stadium; East Lansing, MI		W 35–21	73,879	
September 22	2:30 p.m.	at No. 23 Notre Dame*		Notre Dame Stadium; Notre Dame, IN (rivalry)	NBC	W 17–10	80,795	
September 29	3:30 p.m.	at No. 16 Northwestern	No. 23	Ryan Field; Evanston, IL	ABC	L 26–27	40,103	
October 13	12:00 p.m.	Iowa^{†}		Spartan Stadium; East Lansing, MI	ESPN2	W 31–28	73,680	
October 20	12:00 p.m.	at Minnesota		Hubert H. Humphrey Metrodome; Minneapolis, MN		L 19–28	47,385	
October 27	12:00 p.m.	at Wisconsin		Camp Randall Stadium; Madison, WI	ESPN Plus	W 42–28	79,108	
November 3	3:30 p.m.	No. 6 Michigan		Spartan Stadium; East Lansing, MI (rivalry)	ABC	W 26–24	75,262	
November 10	12:00 p.m.	Indiana	No. 22	Spartan Stadium; East Lansing, MI (rivalry)		L 28–37	73,990	
November 17	12:00 p.m.	at Purdue		Ross–Ade Stadium; West Lafayette, IN	ESPN2	L 14–24	55,660	
November 24	3:30 p.m.	Penn State		Spartan Stadium; East Lansing, MI (rivalry)	ESPN	L 37–42	72,658	
December 1	11:00 a.m.	Missouri*		Spartan Stadium; East Lansing, MI	ESPN2	W 55–7	72,823	
December 31	3:00 p.m.	vs. No. 20 Fresno State*		Spartan Stadium; San Jose, CA (Silicon Valley Football Classic)	FSN	W 44–35	30,456	
*Non-conference game; ^{†}Homecoming; Rankings from AP Poll released prior to the game; All times are in Eastern time

Note: The Missouri game originally scheduled for September 15 was rescheduled to December 1 because of the September 11 attacks.

== Roster ==
2001 Michigan State Spartans football team roster
Players
Coaches
Offense

Pos.	#	Name	Class
WR	1	Charles Rogers	So
RB	8	T. J. Duckett	Sr
QB	9	Jeff Smoker	So
G	76	Will Whitticker	Fr
TE	83	Chris Baker	Sr

Defense

Pos.	#	Name	Class
DE	95	Matthias Askew	So
LB	42	Mike Labinjo	So
LB	44	Ronald Stanley	Fr
DT	95	Josh Shaw	Sr

Special teams

Pos.	#	Name	Class
K	16	Dave Rayner	Fr

Head coach

- Bobby Williams

Coordinators/assistant coaches

- Morris Watts(offensive coordinator)
- Reggie Mitchell (running backs coach)
- Don Treadwell (wide receivers coach)
- Pat Perles (tight ends coach)
- Jeff Stoutland (offensive line coach)
- Brad Miller (defensive coordinator)
- Sal Sunseri (special teams coordinator, linebackers coach)
- Troy Douglas (defensive backs coach)
- Brad Lawing (recruiting coordinator)
- Matt House (graduate assistant)

Legend

- (C) Team captain
- (S) Suspended
- (I) Ineligible
- Injured
- Redshirt

Roster
