= 2002 Michigan State Spartans football team =

American college football season

2002 Michigan State Spartans football
- Conference: Big Ten Conference
- Record: 4–8 (2–6 Big Ten)
- Head coach: Bobby Williams (3rd season; first 9 games); Morris Watts (interim, final 3 games)
- Offensive coordinator: Morris Watts (12th season)
- Defensive coordinator: Bill Miller (4th season)
- Home stadium: Spartan Stadium

2002 Big Ten Conference football standings
	Conf.			Overall
Team	W		L	W		L
No. 1 Ohio State $#+	8	–	0	14	–	0
No. 8 Iowa %+	8	–	0	11	–	2
No. 9 Michigan	6	–	2	10	–	3
No. 16 Penn State	5	–	3	9	–	4
Purdue	4	–	4	7	–	6
Illinois	4	–	4	5	–	7
Minnesota	3	–	5	8	–	5
Wisconsin	2	–	6	8	–	6
Michigan State	2	–	6	4	–	8
Northwestern	1	–	7	3	–	9
Indiana	1	–	7	3	–	9
# – BCS National Champion; $ – BCS representative as conference champion; % – BCS at-large representative; + – Conference co-champions; Rankings from AP Poll

The 2002 Michigan State Spartans football team represented Michigan State University as a member of the Big Ten Conference during the 2002 NCAA Division I-A football season. Led by Bobby Williams in his third and final season as head, the Spartans compiled an overall record of 4–8 with a mark of 2–6 in conference play, tying for eighth place in the Big Ten. William was fired after the ninth game of the season. Michigan State offensive coordinator Morris Watts was appointed interim head coach for the remainder of the year. The team played home games at Spartan Stadium in East Lansing, Michigan.

The Spartans' record of 4–8 was the program's worst record since the 1994 season.

== Schedule ==
Date	Time	Opponent	Rank	Site	TV	Result	Attendance
August 31	3:30 p.m.	Eastern Michigan*	No. 18	Spartan Stadium; East Lansing, MI	ESPN Plus	W 56–7	73,927
September 7	1:05 p.m.	Rice*	No. 15	Spartan Stadium; East Lansing, MI		W 27–10	74,014
September 14	12:00 p.m.	California*	No. 15	Spartan Stadium; East Lansing, MI	ESPN2	L 22–46	72,634
September 21	3:30 p.m.	No. 12 Notre Dame*		Spartan Stadium; East Lansing, MI (rivalry)	ABC	L 17–21	75,182
September 28	1:05 p.m.	Northwestern		Spartan Stadium; East Lansing, MI		W 39–24	74,215
October 12	12:00 p.m.	at No. 17 Iowa		Kinnick Stadium; Iowa City, IA	ESPN	L 16–44	70,397
October 19	12:00 p.m.	Minnesota^{†}		Spartan Stadium; East Lansing, MI	ESPN Plus	L 7–28	74,232
October 26	7:00 p.m.	Wisconsin		Spartan Stadium; East Lansing, MI	ESPN2	L 24–42	74,504
November 2	12:00 p.m.	at No. 15 Michigan		Michigan Stadium; Ann Arbor, MI (rivalry)	ESPN2	L 3–49	111,542
November 9	1:00 p.m.	at Indiana		Memorial Stadium; Bloomington, IN (rivalry)		W 56–21	29,253
November 16	12:00 p.m.	Purdue		Spartan Stadium; East Lansing, MI	ESPN Plus	L 42–45	72,828
November 23	3:30 p.m.	at No. 15 Penn State		Beaver Stadium; University Park, PA (rivalry)	ABC	L 7–61	108,755
*Non-conference game; ^{†}Homecoming; Rankings from AP Poll released prior to the game; All times are in Eastern time

== Rankings ==
Ranking movements Legend: ██ Increase in ranking ██ Decrease in ranking — = Not ranked RV = Received votes
	Week															
Poll	Pre	1	2	3	4	5	6	7	8	9	10	11	12	13	14	Final
AP	18	18	15	15	RV	RV	RV	RV	—	—	—	—	—	—	—	—
Coaches	18	17	15	15	RV	—	—	—	—	—	—	—	—	—	—	—
Harris	Not released							—	—	—	—	—	—	—	—	Not released
BCS	Not released								—	—	—	—	—	—	—	Not released

== Roster ==
2002 Michigan State Spartans football team roster
Players
Coaches
Offense

Pos.	#	Name	Class
OL	69	Kyle Cook	Fr
OL	73	Brian Ottney (C)	Jr
C	51	Chris Morris	Fr
WR	1	Charles Rogers	Jr
QB	9	Jeff Smoker	Jr
QB	5	Drew Stanton	Fr
G	76	Will Whitticker	So

Defense

Pos.	#	Name	Class
DE	95	Matthias Askew	Jr
LB	42	Mike Labinjo	Jr
DE	99	Brandon McKinney	Fr
LB	55	Matt Ott	So
DT	97	Kyle Rasmussen	Jr
DB	36	Eric Smith	Fr
LB	44	Ronald Stanley	So

Special teams

Pos.	#	Name	Class
K	16	Dave Rayner	So

Head coach

- Bobby Williams (fired after Michigan game)
- Morris Watts – interim head coach (finished last three games)

Coordinators/assistant coaches

- Morris Watts – Offensive coordinator/quarterbacks coach
- Reggie Mitchell – Running backs coach/assistant head coach
- Don Treadwell – Wide receivers coach
- Pat Perles – Tight ends coach
- Jeff Stoutland – Offensive line coach
- Brad Miller – Defensive coordinator
- Brad Lawing – Defensive line coach/recruiting coordinator
- Danny Crossman – Special teams coordinator/linebackers coach
- Troy Douglas – Defensive backs coach
- Matt House – Graduate Assistant

Legend

- (C) Team captain
- (S) Suspended
- (I) Ineligible
- Injured
- Redshirt

Roster
Last update: 2020-12-31

== Draft picks ==
Rnd.	Pick No.	NFL team	Player	Pos.	College	Conf.	Notes
1	2		Charles Rogers	WR			
