= Silicon Valley Football Classic =

Silicon Valley Football Classic (defunct)
- Stadium: Spartan Stadium
- Location: San Jose, California
- Operated: 2000–2004
- Conference tie-ins: WAC, Pac-10
- Succeeded by: Poinsettia Bowl

The Silicon Valley Football Classic, sometimes referred to as the Silicon Valley Bowl or Silicon Valley Classic, was an NCAA-certified Division I-A post-season college football bowl game that was played at Spartan Stadium on the South Campus of San Jose State University in San Jose, California, from 2000 to 2004. It had a contractual tie-in with the Western Athletic Conference and the Pac-10. The bowl was initially televised on Fox Sports Net and later moved to ESPN2.

The bowl game consistently struggled financially, due to low television ratings and a lack of corporate sponsorship. Declining attendance contributed to the NCAA de-certifying the bowl after the 2004 season.

== History ==
=== Creation ===
The city of San Jose, San Jose State University President Robert Caret, and the Western Athletic Conference proposed the Silicon Valley Bowl for San Jose in 1999. Caret and other organizers envisioned that with the technology boom of the time, revenue from the bowl game and sponsorships from local technology companies would help fund a $25 million expansion of Spartan Stadium, when then had a capacity around 31,000, to 50,000 seats.

The NCAA approved the bowl game on April 29, 1999. Participating schools would each receive a $1.2 million guaranteed payout. Due to Spartan Stadium having fewer than 50,000 seats, there was no requirement for schools to purchase a minimum number of tickets. Companies expressing written commitments to sponsor the bowl game included Cisco Systems, Comerica Bank, Hewlett-Packard, and Knight Ridder.

=== 2000 ===
The inaugural Silicon Valley Bowl on December 31, 2000 was a 37–34 win for Mountain West Conference team Air Force over Fresno State of the WAC. Fresno State trailed 34–7 at halftime before going on a 24–3 run in the second half. But with 14 seconds left, Fresno State failed on a fake field goal attempt from the Air Force 16.

Attendance was 26,542, and pop group Destiny's Child performed in the halftime show. However, the bowl lacked a corporate sponsor.

=== 2001 ===
With the bowl game still lacking a corporate sponsor, the San Jose City Council approved $150,000 in funding for the bowl's nonprofit organization in June 2001.

The 2001 Silicon Valley Football Classic, again played on December 31, had Michigan State of the Big Ten Conference upset no. 20 (AP) Fresno State 44–35. The game was a near sellout, with 30,456 in attendance. The game featured future NFL players including Fresno State quarterback David Carr, Michigan State quarterback Jeff Smoker, Michigan State wide receiver Charles Rogers, Michigan State running back TJ Duckett, and Fresno State wide receiver Bernard Berrian. In the 2002 NFL draft, Carr would be the first overall pick and Duckett the 18th overall.

A report in the December 23 San Jose Mercury News claimed that Silicon Valley Football Classic organizers overstated the economic value the bowl game brought to the city. Additionally, Air Force and Michigan State reported that they lost money participating in the Silicon Valley Classic. Eventually in March 2002, the San Jose Convention and Visitors Bureau estimated that the game contributed to $9.2 million in economic activity, including over 7,500 hotel rooms booked, in San Jose.

=== 2002 ===
After two straight years of the Silicon Valley Football Classic having the lowest ratings of Division I-A bowl games, Fox Sports Net withdrew from its five-year contract with the bowl in November 2002. This followed continued financial problems for the Silicon Valley Football Classic, namely the third straight year lacking a title sponsor and two companies that funded the 2000 and 2001 games, Knight Ridder and Palm Inc., deciding not to return. The bowl organization rejected a bid by TicketCity for naming rights to the bowl game, citing an unacceptably low payout.

The third edition of the Silicon Valley Football Classic on December 31, 2002 had a second straight appearance by Fresno State of the WAC, this time a 30–21 win vs. ACC opponent Georgia Tech. Attendance was 10,132 in rainy weather.

=== 2003 ===
On top of the drop in attendance for the 2002 Silicon Valley Football Classic, the continuation of this bowl became doubtful after the WAC board of directors voted unanimously in March 2003 to defund the bowl game. Eventually, the bowl would be re-certified by the NCAA in 2003 and hire a new chairperson in San Jose Sharks president Greg Jamison, whose Silicon Valley Sports and Entertainment company would help with marketing and sponsorships.

With 20,126 in attendance, the 2003 Silicon Valley Football Classic played on December 30 was a 17–9 Fresno State win over Pac-10 opponent UCLA in Fresno State's third straight appearance. After the 2003 game, the NCAA instituted new rules for the 2004–05 Bowl Season stating that stadiums had to draw at least 70% of their capacity for bowl games in order to continue hosting them.

=== 2004 ===
The 2004 game was the final edition of the Silicon Valley Football Classic. Although the bowl again had tie-ins with the WAC and Pac-10, neither conference had enough eligible teams available. Silicon Valley Bowl officials invited Northern Illinois of the MAC and Troy of the Sun Belt as at-large teams. Both schools were offered no upfront payment to participate and were responsible for buying 8,000 tickets worth a total of $720,000.

Game attendance was a series low at 5,494, and a power outage caused a 20-minute delay of kickoff. The city of San Jose and Hewlett-Packard each paid $100,000 to be named as primary bowl sponsors, and the WAC made a $300,000 commitment as well. The Classic also spent very little money on advertising. Despite the low attendance numbers, it was estimated the bowl netted a $200,000 profit in 2004.

On April 20, 2005, the NCAA decided not to renew the license of the Silicon Valley Football Classic, due to low attendance and a limit of 28 bowl games. The SVFC was replaced by the Poinsettia Bowl in San Diego, California.

== Game results ==
Rankings are based on the AP Poll prior to the game being played.

Date	Winner		Loser		Attendance	Notes
December 31, 2000	Air Force	37	Fresno State	34	26,542	notes
December 31, 2001	Michigan State	44	#20 Fresno State	35	30,456	notes
December 31, 2002	Fresno State	30	Georgia Tech	21	10,132	notes
December 30, 2003	Fresno State	17	UCLA	9	20,126	notes
December 30, 2004	Northern Illinois	34	Troy	21	21,456	notes

Note: The 2004 game featured a MAC vs. Sun Belt matchup-neither the Pac 10 or WAC was able to send a team.

== Game MVPs ==
Year	Offensive MVP	Position	Team	Defensive MVP	Position	Team
2000	Mike Thiessen	QB	Air Force	Tim Skipper	LB	Fresno State
2001	Charles Rogers	WR	Michigan State	Nick Myers	DE	Michigan State
2002	Rodney Davis	RB	Fresno State	Jason Stewart	DL	Fresno State
2003	Rodney Davis	RB	Fresno State	Garrett McIntyre	DE	Fresno State
2004	DeWhitt Betterson	RB	Troy	Lionel Hickenbottom	S	Northern Illinois

== Most appearances ==
Rank	Team	Appearances	Record
1	Fresno State	4	2–2
T2	Air Force	1	1–0
T2	Michigan State	1	1–0
T2	Northern Illinois	1	1–0
T2	UCLA	1	0–1
T2	Georgia Tech	1	0–1
T2	Troy	1	0–1

== See also ==
- List of college bowl games
