= 2002 Sun Bowl =

American college football game

2002 Wells Fargo Sun Bowl
Purdue Boilermakers	Washington Huskies
(6–6)	(7–5)
Big Ten	Pac-10
34	24
Head coach: Joe Tiller	Head coach: Rick Neuheisel
	1	2	3	4	Total
Purdue	0	14	17	3	34
Washington	17	0	0	7	24
- Date: December 31, 2002
- Season: 2002
- Stadium: Sun Bowl
- Location: El Paso, Texas
- MVP: Kyle Orton, Purdue QB; 25-37, 283 Yards, 1 TD
- Favorite: Washington by 2
- Referee: Tom Ahlers (Big 12)
- Payout: US$1.35 million per team

United States TV coverage
- Network: CBS
- Announcers: Verne Lundquist, Todd Blackledge, Jill Arrington, Andre Ware

The 2002 Wells Fargo Sun Bowl featured the Purdue Boilermakers, and the Washington Huskies. This game was a rematch of the 2001 Rose Bowl.

Washington scored first when quarterback Cody Pickett threw a 7-yard touchdown strike to wide receiver Patrick Reddick for an early 7–0 lead. 2 minutes later, linebacker Marquis Cooper recovered a fumble and returned it 31 yards for a touchdown doubling the lead to 14–0. a 38-yard John Anderson field goal increased the lead to 17–0, which closed out the 1st quarter scoring.

In the second quarter, quarterback Kyle Orton found wide receiver John Standeford for a 7-yard touchdown pass, to put Purdue on the scoreboard down 17–7. Just before halftime, Washington fumbled the ball, and it was recovered by Ray Williams in the end zone for a touchdown, making the halftime score 17–14.

In the third quarter, Berin Lacevic kicked a 22-yard field goal to tie the game at 17. Running back Joey Harris later scored on a 10-yard touchdown run for Purdue, giving Purdue its first lead at 24–17. On Washington's next possession, they fumbled again, and Gilbert Gardner ran it in 19 yards for a touchdown, and Purdue increased its lead to 31–17.

A 29-yard field goal in the 4th quarter by Purdue made the lead 34–17, and Purdue had scored 17 unanswered points. Washington got on the board one last time after Cody Pickett found Patrick Reddick for a 12-yard touchdown pass to make the final margin 34–24, which was also the final score of the 2001 Rose Bowl just with Washington winning that game.
