= 2002 Purdue Boilermakers football team =

American college football season

2002 Purdue Boilermakers football

Sun Bowl champion

Sun Bowl, W 34–24 vs. Washington
- Conference: Big Ten Conference
- Record: 7–6 (4–4 Big Ten)
- Head coach: Joe Tiller (6th season)
- Offensive coordinator: Jim Chaney (6th season)
- Offensive scheme: Spread
- Defensive coordinator: Brock Spack (6th season)
- Base defense: 4–3
- Captains: Landon Johnson; Gene Mruczkowski; Joe Odom; Ralph Turner
- Home stadium: Ross–Ade Stadium

2002 Big Ten Conference football standings
	Conf.			Overall
Team	W		L	W		L
No. 1 Ohio State $#+	8	–	0	14	–	0
No. 8 Iowa %+	8	–	0	11	–	2
No. 9 Michigan	6	–	2	10	–	3
No. 16 Penn State	5	–	3	9	–	4
Purdue	4	–	4	7	–	6
Illinois	4	–	4	5	–	7
Minnesota	3	–	5	8	–	5
Wisconsin	2	–	6	8	–	6
Michigan State	2	–	6	4	–	8
Northwestern	1	–	7	3	–	9
Indiana	1	–	7	3	–	9
# – BCS National Champion; $ – BCS representative as conference champion; % – BCS at-large representative; + – Conference co-champions; Rankings from AP Poll

The 2002 Purdue Boilermakers football team represented Purdue University in the 2002 NCAA Division I-A football season. The team was coached by Joe Tiller and played its home games at Ross–Ade Stadium. Purdue played thirteen games in the 2002 season, finishing with a 7–6 record and a victory in the Sun Bowl to Washington.

== Schedule ==
Date	Time	Opponent	Site	TV	Result	Attendance
August 31	2:00 pm	Illinois State*	Ross–Ade Stadium; West Lafayette, IN		W 51–10	47,701
September 7	12:00 pm	at No. 23 Notre Dame*	Notre Dame Stadium; Notre Dame, IN	NBC	L 17–24	80,795
September 14	1:00 pm	Western Michigan*	Ross–Ade Stadium; West Lafayette, IN		W 28–24	55,140
September 21	1:00 pm	Wake Forest*	Ross–Ade Stadium; West Lafayette, IN		L 21–24	48,550
September 28	5:00 pm	Minnesota^{†}	Ross–Ade Stadium; West Lafayette, IN	ESPN2	W 28–15	56,839
October 5	11:00 am	at Iowa	Kinnick Stadium; Iowa City, IA	ESPN	L 28–31	68,249
October 12	12:00 pm	at Illinois	Memorial Stadium; Champaign, IL		L 31–38 ^{OT}	55,590
October 19	11:00 am	No. 11 Michigan	Ross–Ade Stadium; West Lafayette, IN	ESPN	L 21–23	62,414
October 26	12:00 pm	at Northwestern	Ryan Field; Evanston, IL	ESPN+	W 42–13	30,158
November 9	12:00 pm	No. 3 Ohio State	Ross–Ade Stadium; West Lafayette, IN (Holy Buckeye)	ABC	L 6–10	65,250
November 16	12:00 pm	at Michigan State	Spartan Stadium; East Lansing, MI	ESPN+	W 45–42	72,828
November 23	3:30 pm	Indiana	Ross–Ade Stadium; West Lafayette, IN (Old Oaken Bucket)	ESPN	W 34–10	59,114
December 31	2:00 pm	vs. Washington*	Sun Bowl Stadium; El Paso, TX (Sun Bowl)	CBS	W 34–24	48,917
*Non-conference game; ^{†}Homecoming; Rankings from AP Poll released prior to the game; All times are in Eastern time

== Roster ==
2002 Purdue Boilermakers football team roster
Players
Coaches
Offense

Pos.	#	Name	Class
OL		Kelly Butler
WR		Anthony Chambers	Jr
TE		Charles Davis	Fr
WR		Jameson Evans	Fr
RB		Deaunte Ferrell	Jr
OL		Nick Hardwick
RB		Joey Harris	Jr
WR		Marc Huddleston	Fr
WR		Chris James	Sr
RB		Brandon Jones	Fr
QB		Brandon Kirsch	Fr
OL		Pete Lougheed
RB		Montrell Lowe	Sr
OL		Max Miler
WR		Seth Morales	Sr
G	79	Gene Mruczkowski (C)	Sr
WR		Kevin Noel	So
QB	18	Kyle Orton	So
QB		Mike Rhinehart	So
RB		Jacob Rowe	Sr
WR		Drew Rucks	Fr
WR		John Standeford	Jr
WR		Taylor Stubblefield	So
OL		Matt Turner
OL		Rob Turner	Sr
RB		Jerod Void	Fr
WR		Ray Williams	Fr
WR		Jamaal Wilson	Jr

Defense

Pos.	#	Name	Class
DB		Chad Dickerson	Fr
DL		Vedran Dzolovic
LB		Gilbert Gardner	Jr
LB	44	Jon Goldsberry	So
DL		Brent Grover	Fr
DL		Brandon Johnson
LB		Landon Johnson
LB		Niko Koutouvides	Jr
DL		Kevin Nesfield
LB	51	Joe Odom (C)	Sr
DB		Sean Petty
DL		Shaun Phillips	Jr
DB		Jacques Reeves	Jr
DB		Antwaun Rogers	So
S	9	Stuart Schweigert	Jr
DL		Craig Terrill
S	8	Ralph Turner (C)	Sr
DL		Brandon Villareal

Special teams

Pos.	#	Name	Class
K		Berin Lacevic	Jr
P		Brent Slaton	Jr

Head coach

- Joe Tiller

Coordinators/assistant coaches

- Jim Chaney (OC)
- Brock Spack (DC)
- Blaine Bennett (QB/RC)
- Greg Olson (TE/RC)

Legend

- (C) Team captain
- (S) Suspended
- (I) Ineligible
- Injured
- Redshirt

Roster
Last update: 2002-10-06

== Game summaries ==
=== Illinois State ===
Team	1	2	3	4	Total
Illinois St	0	0	10	0	10
• Purdue	20	10	7	14	51

- Date: August 31
- Location: Ross–Ade Stadium, West Lafayette, Indiana

The Boilermakers raced out to 27–0 lead early in the second quarter and never looked back vs. the overmatched Redbirds. The Purdue offense rolled up 500+ total yards in the first-ever August game at newly refurbished Ross–Ade Stadium.

=== Notre Dame ===
Team	1	2	3	4	Total
Purdue	0	7	7	3	17
• Notre Dame	0	17	0	7	24

- Date: September 7
- Location: Notre Dame Stadium, South Bend, Indiana

With the help of 3 non-offensive TDs (2 Defense, 1 Special Team), Tyrone Willingham won his first Home game as coach of the Fighting Irish. The Boilermakers got a 76-yard punt return TD from Anthony Chambers, RB Joey Harris ran for 125 yards, and WR John Standeford had 5 catches for 110 yards in the loss.

=== Western Michigan ===
Team	1	2	3	4	Total
Western Michigan	14	0	0	10	24
• Purdue	7	0	14	7	28

- Date: September 14
- Location: Ross–Ade Stadium, West Lafayette, Indiana

Thanks to Western Michigan's potent dual-QB passing attack, the Boilermakers found themselves in a dogfight with the Broncos deep into the fourth quarter. John Standeford (7 catches for 143 yards, 2TDs) caught game-winning TD with 5:26 to go. Stuart Schweigert established Purdue interception record with his 12th career pick in the 4th quarter.

=== Wake Forest ===
Team	1	2	3	4	Total
• Wake Forest	0	14	10	0	24
Purdue	7	7	7	0	21

- Date: September 21
- Location: Ross–Ade Stadium, West Lafayette, Indiana

The ACC's Demon Deacons rolled up almost 250 yards rushing to pull off the mild upset. Chris Barclay had three rushing TDs for the Deacs, who forced/benefitted from 5 turnovers and 3 missed 4th-quarter field goals that would have tied the game. For Purdue, Kyle Orton had a productive passing day (24–43; 331 yds), Joey Harris ran for 120 yards, and John Standeford had a terrific performance (6–191) with 2 long TD receptions.

=== Minnesota ===
Team	1	2	3	4	Total
Minnesota	0	9	0	6	15
• Purdue	7	0	21	0	28

- Date: September 28
- Location: Ross–Ade Stadium, West Lafayette, Indiana

The Boilermakers improved to 3–2, using a strong third quarter performance to defeat previously unbeaten Minnesota in an evening tilt on ESPN2. On the first play of the second half, strong safety Ralph Turner returned an interception for a TD. Later, after linebacker Gilbert Gardner returned a fumble to the Gophers' 9-yard-line, defensive end Shaun Phillips lined up at tight end and caught a touchdown pass from Kyle Orton (19–32; 190 yds) in a goal-line situation. Joey Harris ran for another 100+ yards in the win, while the Purdue defense limited Gophers' QB Asad Abdul-Khaliq to 33% passing on 48 attempts.

=== Iowa ===
Team	1	2	3	4	Total
Purdue	7	7	0	14	28
• Iowa	3	7	14	7	31

- Date: October 5
- Location: Kinnick Stadium, Iowa City, Iowa

Reserve DB Adolphus Shelton ended a final drive by intercepting backup QB Brandon Kirsch in the final seconds to preserve the win for the Hawkeyes that dropped Purdue to 3–3. Iowa QB Brad Banks had just led the Hawkeyes on an 87-yard drive, ending with a 4th down TD pass to TE Dallas Clark for what turned out to be the winning points. The Purdue passing game moved the ball with 400+ passing yards combined between Kyle Orton and the freshman Kirsch, who replaced the injured Orton. The Boilermakers came back from a 24–14 deficit with two 4th quarter TD drives before Banks' TD pass. The Boilermakers lost due to mistakes on big plays – two on special teams (blocked FG returned for TD, blocked punt returned for TD), and a 95-yard TD catch-and-run by Dallas Clark.

=== Illinois ===
Team	1	2	3	4	OT	Total
Purdue	0	10	7	14	0	31
• Illinois	17	7	0	7	7	38

- Date: October 12
- Location: Memorial Stadium, Champaign, Illinois

After overcoming a 24–0 first half deficit, the Boilermakers fell to 3–4 in spectacular – and controversial – fashion in an exciting non-televised game. The Illini (2–5) built their lead by returning the opening kickoff for a TD, then getting an 83-yard run from Antoineo Harris (who narrowly avoided a safety on the play), getting a 47-yard TD run from Harris (23 carries, 195 yards) and finally a Dustin Ward TD pass to Brandon Lloyd. Freshman QB Brandon Kirsch relieved starting QB Kyle Orton for the second straight week with much success, rallying Purdue to a 31–24 lead in the 4th quarter. Redshirt freshman RB Brandon Jones was a big part of the rally as well with 127 rushing yards and a 36-yard TD catch.

After Purdue's go-ahead score, Illinois mounted a long drive that came to a 4th and goal from the Purdue 1 yard line with 7 seconds left. Despite protest from the Purdue coaching staff, officials ruled Antoineo Harris had crossed the goal line for a tying TD with 3 seconds remaining. After downing a short squib kick, Kyle Orton re-entered to complete a "Hail Mary" pass to WR John Standeford, who made the catch near the end zone before being pushed back. Officials ruled him down at the 1 yard line (despite further protest from the Purdue coaching staff), sending the game into overtime. Illinois then won the game in OT, getting a TD catch from WR Greg Lewis, and then stopping Purdue at the 7 yard line on 4th down.

Purdue compiled almost 600 yards of offense, and LB Niko Koutouvides had 14 tackles in the painful loss.

=== Michigan ===
Team	1	2	3	4	Total
• Michigan	0	10	7	6	23
Purdue	0	7	7	7	21

- Date: October 19
- Location: Ross–Ade Stadium, West Lafayette, Indiana

The Boilermakers fell to 3–5, losing by a close margin again, this time to the ninth-ranked Wolverines. In his first start QB Brandon Kirsch was effective throwing (172 yards) and running (81 yards), but 2 interceptions by QB Kyle Orton plus 2 missed FGs by Berin Lacevic proved fatal to the Boilermakers' upset bid. Purdue closed the margin to 2 with RB Jerod Void's TD run with 8 seconds left in the game, but then Michigan recovered the ensuing onside kick.

WR Taylor Stubblefield had 11 catches for 104 yards for the Boilers in defeat.

=== Northwestern ===
Team	1	2	3	4	Total
• Purdue	14	7	7	14	42
Northwestern	0	7	0	6	13

- Date: October 26
- Location: Ryan Field, Evanston, Illinois

The Boilermakers improved to 4–5 by running all over a young and undersized Wildcats' defense for a Joe Tiller-era record 407 yards. RBs Joey Harris and Brandon Jones combined to run for nearly 300 yards, while QB Brandon Kirsch completed 8 of his 10 passes for 144 yards and 2 TDs.

=== Ohio State ===
#3 Ohio State Buckeyes (10–0) at Purdue Boilermakers (4–5)

Quarter	1	2	3	4	Total
Ohio St	0	3	0	7	10
Purdue	3	0	0	3	6

at Ross–Ade Stadium, West Lafayette, Indiana

- Date: November 9, 2002
- Game time: 12:00 p.m.
- Game weather: Mostly cloudy, 63 °F (17 °C)
- Game attendance: 65,250
- Referee: Dennis Lipski
- TV announcers (ABC): Brent Musburger, Gary Danielson, and Jack Arute
- Box Score

Game information

First quarter

- PUR – Berin Lacevic 21-yard field goal, 0:42. Purdue 3–0. Drive: 6 plays, 19 yards, 1:57.

Second quarter

- OSU – Mike Nugent 22-yard field goal, 0:00. Tie 3–3. Drive: 9 plays, 36 yards, 3:15.

Fourth quarter

- PUR – Berin Lacevic 32-yard field goal, 7:50. Purdue 6–3. Drive: 8 plays, 65 yards, 4:18.
- OSU – Michael Jenkins 37-yard pass from Craig Krenzel (Mike Nugent kick), 1:36. Ohio St 10–6. Drive: 4 plays, 46 yards, 1:34.

Top passers

- OSU – Craig Krenzel – 13/20, 173 yards, TD, INT
- PUR – Kyle Orton – 18/28, 169 yards, 3 INT

Top rushers

- OSU – Maurice Clarett – 14 rushes, 52 yards
- PUR – Brandon Jones – 11 rushes, 28 yards

Top receivers

- OSU – Michael Jenkins – 5 receptions, 87 yards, TD
- PUR – Taylor Stubblefield – 7 receptions, 63 yards

As with all of their 2002 losses, Purdue suffered its 6th of the season to eventual national champion Ohio State in excruciating fashion. It was a defensive struggle throughout, as the teams went into the half tied at 3 (Purdue' points were set up by a Niko Koutouvides interception). In the 4th quarter, Purdue took a 6–3 lead thanks to a Berin Lacevic field goal after a 58-yard pass to freshman WR Ray Williams.

With less than 2 minutes remaining, the Buckeyes offense was given a short field after a Chris Gamble punt return. QB Craig Krenzel overcame a second down sack to complete a 3rd down and 14 pass to TE Ben Hartsock, setting up a 4th and 1 from Purdue's 36 yard line. Under a heavy blitz, Krenzel threw deep for WR Michael Jenkins who caught the ball over the outstretched arm of CB Antwaun Rogers for the winning TD. Purdue's final drive ended when 2-way player Chris Gamble intercepted a deep pass thrown by Kyle Orton, Orton's 3rd interception of the game.

This game has been dubbed the "Holy Buckeye" game, named for the Brent Musburger call of the winning play.

=== Michigan State ===
Team	1	2	3	4	Total
• Purdue	7	17	7	14	45
Michigan St	10	7	13	12	42

- Date: November 16
- Location: Spartan Stadium, East Lansing, Michigan

Two teams desperate to remain in the hunt for a bowl selection played a wild game that featured 7 lead changes. In the end, Purdue (5–6) prevailed when QB Kyle Orton relieved an injured Brandon Kirsch on a late drive to throw a deep 4th down TD pass to WR John Standeford with just over 3 minutes left. The defense then sealed the game by stopping a scrambling QB Damon Dowdell short of a first down near midfield in the closing minute.

Purdue had a terrific day on the ground, running for over 300 yards as a team thanks to QB Brandon Kirsch and RBs Joey Harris and Brandon Jones (125, 89, and 88 yards respectively).

Two all Big Ten WRs had phenomenal days. Purdue's Standeford had 5 catches for 136 yards and 2 scores, while the Spartans' Charles Rogers had 8 catches for 161 yards and 2 TDs.

=== Indiana ===
Team	1	2	3	4	Total
Indiana	0	3	0	7	10
• Purdue	7	10	7	10	34

- Date: November 23
- Location: Ross–Ade Stadium, West Lafayette, Indiana

The Boilermakers qualified for their 6th bowl game in 6 years under Joe Tiller by reclaiming the Old Oaken Bucket from a depleted Indiana Hoosiers team in a decisive 34–10 win. (Per the ESPN telecast, less than 50 players dressed for IU.) The Purdue offense again shined, piling up 500+ yards behind another strong O-Line performance that enabled both Joey Harris and Brandon Jones to exceed 100 yards rushing. After an early long TD pass to John Standeford, QB Brandon Kirsch was replaced by Kyle Orton, who had a very efficient passing day with a 22–28; 173 yard performance. Fifth year senior SS Ralph Turner capped his final home game with a game-clinching interception.

=== Sun Bowl ===
Team	1	2	3	4	Total
• Purdue	0	14	17	3	34
Washington	17	0	0	7	24

- Date: December 31
- Location: Sun Bowl, El Paso, Texas

The Boilermakers finished a difficult but rewarding 2002 campaign by defeating their 2001 Rose Bowl opponent Washington Huskies by the same score of that contest 2 seasons prior, 34–24.

Purdue dug a big first quarter hole by committing numerous gaffes on offense (bad snap returned for TD) and special teams (punter mishandled the snap, turned into a short TD drive for the Huskies). After that, however, the Boilermakers found a rhythm and took control of the game. QB Kyle Orton had his best overall game of the season (25–37; 283 yards), backed by 17 combined catches from WRs John Standeford and Taylor Stubblefield as well as 93 rushing yards from Joey Harris. Purdue's final TD game on a forced fumble for TD by LB Gilbert Gardner, and their final points came on a Berin Lacevic FG after a time-killing drive.

The 2002 Purdue Boilermakers, though they finished 7–6, nonetheless accomplished a rare feat; they finished ranked #1 in the Big Ten in total offense AND total defense yards per game.
