= Brian Ottney =

American football player (1980–2003)

Brian Ottney (July 4, 1980 – September 1, 2003) was an American football player. He played at the center position for Michigan State from 2000 to 2002, starting 33 consecutive games, and served as a co-captain of the 2002 Michigan State Spartans football team. He earned second-team Freshman All-America honors from The Sporting News in 2000 and was named to the watch-list for the 2003 Rimington Trophy. Despite having a year of eligibility remaining, his football career ended in May 2003 due to chronic knee problems and after undergoing knee surgery three times as well as surgery on his shoulder. Ottney died in September 2003, his death ruled a suicide by the Los Angeles County Coroner.

== Early years ==
Ottney was born in 1980 and grew up in Troy, Michigan. He played high school football for Troy High School, where he received recognition on several prep All-America teams, including PrepStar and The National Recruiting Advisor. He was ranked among the country's 20 best offensive linemen by SuperPrep (No. 17). He was also rated as the third best player in the State of Michigan by the Lansing State Journal and the 12th best by The Detroit News.

== Michigan State ==
Ottney played college football for the Michigan State Spartans football program. He was six feet, six inches tall and weighed 305 pounds while playing for Michigan State. He missed his freshman season after suffering an injury that required surgery on his right shoulder, and he was granted a medical redshirt for the 1999 season. He became the Spartans' starting center from 2000 to 2002. He was the leader of the offensive line during his years at Michigan State. One reporter wrote that, in the seconds before breaking the huddle and snapping the ball, "Ottney is scanning, pointing and barking out orders to his four mates on the Spartans' offensive line."

While playing for Michigan State, Ottney developed a reputation for an intense and intimidating appearance and style of play. The Detroit News in December 2001 wrote: "What's scary about the first impression Brian Ottney makes is that, well, he's scary. At 6-foot-6, 305 pounds, with a shaved head, goatee and a seemingly permanent scowl, Ottney appears to be ready to snap at any moment. And, because of his appearance and demeanor, Ottney, a Michigan State center, not only has provided the Spartans' young offensive line with a semblance of consistency this season, he has amused his teammates with his nonstop intensity." Another reporter wrote this about Ottney's intensity: "Ottney was the most intense person I've ever met. In three years of covering Ottney, I never saw him smile. I never saw him joke. The scowl was always present."

Ottney was selected as a co-captain of the 2002 Michigan State Spartans football team. Prior to the start of the 2002 season, Ottney stated that his goal was to win a national championship, and The Detroit News wrote: "Stone Cold Brian Ottney is in battle-royal mode now. His head is shaved and his muscles are chiseled, and he carries a cup into which to spit chewing tobacco as he talks to reporters in the Duffy Daugherty Building."

In his three years with the Spartans, Ottney started 33 consecutive games at center. As a redshirt sophomore, he was a key blocker for tailback T. J. Duckett as Duckett rushed for 1,420 yards. Ottney earned second-team Freshman All-America honors from The Sporting News after the 2000 season. Over the course of his career, Ottney recorded 156 career pancake blocks, including five double-figure games.

In March 2003, Ottney was named to the watch-list for the 2003 Rimington Trophy, awarded each year to the best center in college football. However, and despite having a year of eligibility remaining, Ottney announced in May 2003 that he was leaving the Michigan State football team due to chronic knee problems. Ottney said at the time, "This is the toughest decision I've ever had to make. Football has been the most important thing in my life, and I leave the game with many regrets. I've had three knee surgeries, and I've played with a great deal of pain." Jeff Stoutland, who coached Ottney at Michigan State and later became the offensive line coach of the Alabama Crimson Tide and the Philadelphia Eagles, called Otney "the best center I ever coached" and "the epitome of what a coach looks for in an offensive lineman...He lived to play the game."

Ottney graduated from Michigan State with a bachelor's degree in building construction management.

== Death ==
On September 1, 2003, Ottney died in Long Beach, California, where he had moved to work in the construction industry. His death was originally believed to have been caused by a seizure, and a preliminary report following autopsy did not determine a cause of death. However, following alcohol and toxicology analysis, the Los Angeles County Coroner ruled Ottney's death was a suicide resulting from a combination of medication and alcohol. The Coroner also noted that Ottney had a history of depression. At the time of his death, Ottney was engaged to marry a former Michigan State Spartans softball player later in the year. Michigan State announced in September 2003 that its football players would wear a black No. 73 patch on their jerseys during the 2003 season in memory of Ottney.
