= Clock incident =

Clock incident may refer to:

- 1994 NBA Playoffs - The Clock Incident, an event which occurred in Game 4 of the 1994 NBA Playoffs between teams Houston Rockets and Utah Jazz
- 2001 Michigan vs. Michigan State football game, called the "Clock incident" or "Clockgate"
- Ahmed Mohamed clock incident, an event that happened at a school in Texas in 2015
- 2026 Western Michigan vs. Michigan football game, called “60:01,” or the “Bail Mary.”

== See also ==
- The Counter-Clock Incident, an episode of Star Trek: The Animated Series, first aired in 1974
- Activation on the incidence of a clock signal, see Clock gating
