= Michigan–Michigan State football rivalry =

American college football rivalry

- Michigan Wolverines Michigan State Spartans
- First meeting: October 12, 1898; Michigan, 39–0
- Latest meeting: November 7, 2026; Michigan State, 15–6
- Next meeting: 2027
- Trophy: Paul Bunyan Trophy

Statistics
- Total meetings: 119
- All-time record: Michigan leads, 75–39–5
- Trophy series: Michigan leads, 42–30–2
- Largest victory: October 8, 1902; Michigan, 119-0
- Longest win streak: Michigan, 14 (1916–1929)
- Longest unbeaten streak: Michigan, 18 (1916–1933)
- Current win streak: Michigan State, 1 (2026–present)

Locations of Michigan and Michigan State

The Battle for the Paul Bunyan Trophy is an American college football rivalry between the Michigan Wolverines and the Michigan State Spartans. The teams have met 118 times since 1898, including in every year since 1945.

The winner of each year's game receives the Paul Bunyan – Governor of Michigan Trophy, a four-foot wooden statue of a lumberjack. It was first presented in 1953, when Michigan State football began competing as a member of the Big Ten Conference.

Michigan leads the series with an overall record of 75–39–5, in part because Michigan State won only two games (in 1913 and 1915, under head coach John Macklin) and tied three others in the first 28 years of the rivalry. Since 1968, the series is 39-19 in favor of Michigan.

Forty-four of the first 50 games were played on Michigan's home field; the teams began alternating home fields in 1958. The game has never been contested anywhere besides Ann Arbor or East Lansing.

The Spartans won four consecutive games from 1934 to 1937 under head coach Charlie Bachman, then lost 12 in a row after the arrival of Fritz Crisler as Michigan's head coach in 1938. The Spartans' longest run of success against the Wolverines was in the 1950s and 1960s, when they went 14–4–2 under head coaches Biggie Munn and Duffy Daugherty.

The pendulum shifted back to the Wolverines under Bo Schembechler and his successors: Michigan won 30 of 38 contests from 1970 to 2007. After Mike Hart said in 2007 that the Spartans were the Wolverines' "little brother", Spartans head coach Mark Dantonio led his team to victory in seven of eight games from 2008 to 2015. From 2016 to 2019, Michigan won three out of four, but the Spartans won the 2020 and 2021 games under new head coach Mel Tucker, and Michigan won the next four games from 2022 to 2025.

The Big Ten Conference removed the divisional format in 2024, but designated the Michigan-Michigan State game one of the 11 rivalry games guaranteed to continue under the conference's "Flex Protect Model". Because the Big Ten Championship Game features the top two teams in the conference, the schools could theoretically meet twice in a season.

== Paul Bunyan Trophy ==
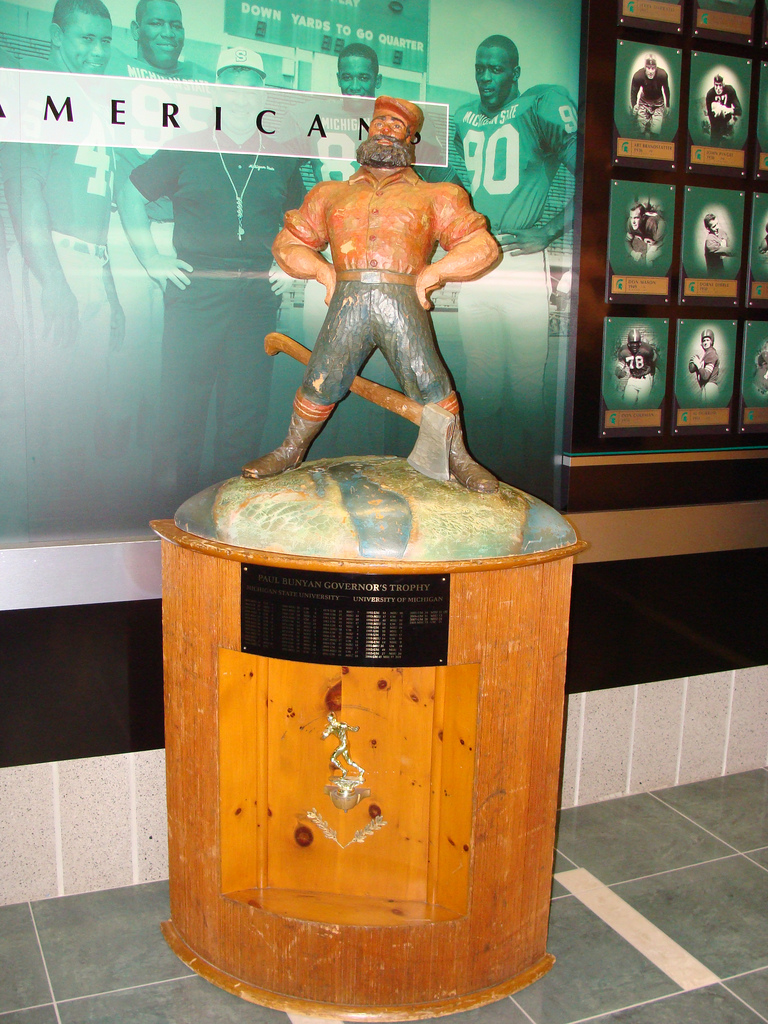
The Paul Bunyan Trophy on display at Michigan State in 2009

In 1953, the "Paul Bunyan – Governor of Michigan Trophy", or simply the Paul Bunyan Trophy, was introduced into the rivalry. It is a four-foot tall wooden statue of Paul Bunyan, the giant lumberjack of American folklore, mounted on a five-foot base. It reflects Michigan's history as a major lumber-producing state. The trophy was first presented by Michigan governor G. Mennen Williams to commemorate Michigan State's first year of football competition in the Big Ten.

Prior to awarding the first trophy in 1953, Michigan enjoyed an overwhelming 33–9–3 series advantage, leading athletic director Fritz Crisler to reportedly plan to refuse the trophy if Michigan had won. Crisler's protests turned out to be irrelevant, as Michigan State won the first trophy game afterwards displaying it in Jenison Fieldhouse.

The following year in 1954, the trophy was left on the field for half an hour after Michigan defeated the Spartans. "We'll find a place for the trophy," Crisler told The Michigan Daily after the game. The Paul Bunyan Trophy was then stored in an equipment locker at Michigan Stadium.

Despite winning in 1954 and 1955, Michigan did not engrave their scores onto the neglected trophy. When the Spartans won in 1956, they engraved the Wolverine victories onto the trophy. The Spartans possessed the trophy for the next eight years, tied for the longest the trophy has remained at one school, and part of a streak during which the Paul Bunyan Trophy was in East Lansing for 11 of 12 years.

The 1958 game ended in a 12–12 tie. The favored Spartans were so embarrassed that they didn't win, they originally refused to keep the trophy while Michigan also refused. Michigan State eventually relented and kept the trophy.

In 1999, Michigan coach Lloyd Carr called it "the ugliest trophy in college football", but added: "When you don't have him, you miss him."

== Notable games ==
=== 1898: The first game ===
The first game in the rivalry was played in Ann Arbor on October 12, 1898, with Michigan University defeating the nascent Michigan Agricultural College (MAC, with 405 total students enrolled), 39–0. The Detroit Free Press wrote that the contest was "essentially a practice game," as Michigan played 25 different players during the game. Charles Widman scored two touchdowns, and Leo J. Keena kicked a field goal from a place-kick, "the first time a Michigan eleven has ever scored in that fashion." After the 1898 shutout, Michigan sent its freshman team against State Agricultural College for the next three years.

=== 1908: First game in East Lansing and first tie ===
In 1908, the game was played for the first time in East Lansing, before 6,000 spectators at East Lansing's College Field. When the game ended in a scoreless tie, the Aggies' fans "went wild with delight". In Ann Arbor, the result was met with disbelief among Michigan fans who had expected an easy win. The Detroit Free Press called it "the greatest game of football ever seen in this part of the state."

=== 1910: M.A.C.'s undefeated season spoiled ===
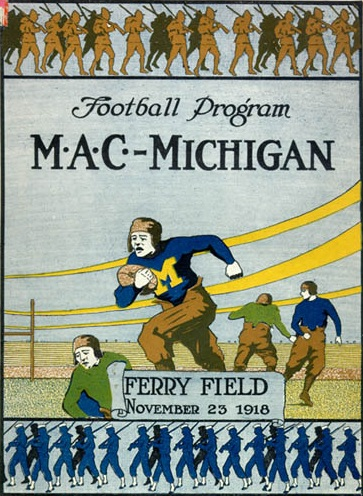
Cover art from program for the November 1918 football game between the University of Michigan and Michigan Agricultural College

On October 15, 1910, Michigan beat Michigan Agricultural 6–3 at Ferry Field. In games against other opponents, the 1910 Michigan Agricultural team compiled a record of 6–0 and outscored opponents 165 to 2 (including a 17–0 victory over Notre Dame). Prior to the Michigan game, the M. A. C. student body adopted the slogan, "On to Michigan." After a scoreless first half, the Aggies blocked two punts in the third quarter. On the second occasion, the punt was blocked and rolled to Michigan's 12-yard line where the Aggies recovered the ball. Leon Hill kicked a field goal from the 21-yard line, and the Aggies' maintained a 3–0 lead into the fourth quarter. With less than five minutes left in the game, Michigan quarterback Shorty McMillan completed a pass to Stanley Borleske who ran 50 yards to the Aggies' 15-yard line. Due to a penalty, the Wolverines had five unsuccessful chances to score the touchdown after advancing to the three-yard line. Michigan then lined up for a field goal, but the play was a fake. Don Green took the snap from center and ran for the touchdown.

=== 1913 and 1915: M.A.C.'s first victories ===
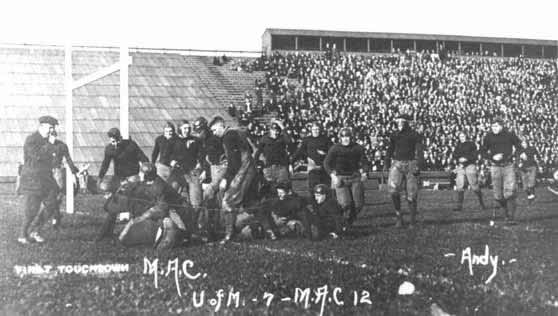
1913 football game between Michigan Agricultural College (now Michigan State University) and the University of Michigan

On October 18, 1913, Michigan Agricultural secured its first victory over Michigan, 12–7. The Aggies' fullback, George E. Julian, scored two touchdowns, and Blake Miller returned a Michigan fumble 45 yards for a touchdown. Miller suffered a blow to the head during the game and was hospitalized in serious condition. After the game, The Michigan Alumnus made note of the Aggies' potential as an athletic threat: "This victory with the football tie in 1908, and the Farmers' clean sweep in baseball in 1912, point to the fact that M.A.C. will bear watching by Michigan."

In 1915, the Aggies again defeated Michigan, 24–0. Neno DaPrato scored two touchdowns and kicked a field goal for the Aggies. In the Detroit Free Press, E. A. Batchelor summed up the game: "Twenty-four to nothing sounds like a horrible beating but it doesn't even begin to express how completely the M.A.C. team outplayed and outfought Michigan's. It wasn't merely a defeat for the Maize and Blue but a massacre, a rout, an annihilation. . . . Michigan was beaten in everything. In music, cheering, fighting and playing football, the Aggies just naturally outclassed their foemen so badly that the Maize and Blue crowd could find no single straw at which to clutch as it drowned in a sea of tears." The victory was the second in three years against the Wolverines under head coach John Macklin.

=== 1934: MSC snaps Michigan's 22-game unbeaten streak ===
In 1934, Michigan State College (The Spartans as of 1925) coach Charlie Bachman led the Spartans to a 16–0 victory in Ann Arbor. Michigan State dominated the game statistically with 182 yards from scrimmage to 72 for Michigan, and with 15 first downs to three for Michigan. The loss broke Michigan's 22-game unbeaten streak dating back to October 1931, though it contained multiple ties. After the game, a group of Michigan State supporters rushed the field and attempted to tear down the goal posts at the north end of the field. Michigan fans then charged the field to protect the goal posts. Fist fights ensued, and the "rioting" continued for 20 minutes. Bachman's Spartans continued to dominate with a 25–6 victory in 1935, a 21–7 victory in 1936, and a 19–14 victory in 1937.

=== 1940: The Tom Harmon game ===
In 1940, Michigan defeated Michigan State College by a 21 to 14 score. Michigan halfback Tom Harmon scored all 21 points for Michigan, running for three touchdowns and kicking the extra points as well. Harmon went on to win the 1940 Heisman Trophy.

=== 1947: Crisler's "Mad Magicians" spoil Biggie Munn's debut ===
In 1947, Biggie Munn took over as Michigan State College's head coach. Munn had been an assistant coach at Michigan under Fritz Crisler from 1938 to 1945. On September 27, 1947, Munn made his debut as the Spartans' head coach, playing his former mentor in Ann Arbor. In one of the first televised football games in the State of Michigan (broadcast on WWJ-TV), Michigan won by a 55–0 score, outgaining the Spartans by 504 yards to 56. The 1947 Michigan team, regarded as one of the best in school history, became known as the "Mad Magicians". Michigan went on to complete back-to-back undefeated seasons in 1947 and 1948.

=== 1950 to 1953: Munn's Spartans win four in a row ===
For the second time in series history, Michigan State College won four consecutive games against Michigan from 1950 to 1953. In these peak years of the "Biggie" Munn era, the Spartans lost only two games in four years. The 1950 team was ranked No. 8 and defeated Michigan, 14–7. The 1951 team was ranked No. 2 and defeated Michigan, 25–0. The undefeated 1952 team won the national championship and defeated Michigan, 27–13. And the 1953 team was ranked No. 3, won the Big Ten championship in its first year of conference play, and defeated Michigan, 14–6.

=== 1956: No. 2 vs. No. 5 ===
In 1956, the teams met with the Spartans ranked No. 2 and the Wolverines ranked No. 5 – the highest combined ranking in series history. After a scoreless first half in which Michigan dominated statistically, turnovers led to two Michigan State scores. In the third quarter, the Spartans intercepted a pass at Michigan's 38-yard line, setting up a 20-yard field goal, and in the fourth quarter, the Spartans recovered a fumble at Michigan's 21-yard line, leading to a Spartan touchdown and the final margin of victory, 9–0.

=== 1969: Daugherty defeats Schembechler in his first season ===
In 1969, Bo Schembechler made his debut as Michigan's head coach. The Wolverines were ranked No. 13 in the AP Poll when they played Duffy Daugherty's Spartans. Led by halfback Don Highsmith (134 rushing yards and two touchdowns on a Big Ten record 30 carries) and quarterback Bill Triplett (143 rushing yards and a touchdown on 18 carries), the Spartans beat Michigan and outgained the Wolverines on the ground by a total of 348 yards to 176. The game was Michigan's only conference loss in 1969.

=== 1978: Ed Smith to Kirk Gibson ===
In 1978, Michigan was ranked No. 5 when the unranked Spartans visited Ann Arbor. Michigan had won the previous eight series meetings, but quarterback Ed Smith led the Spartans to a 24–15 upset win. Smith passed for 248 yards, including five completions to flanker Kirk Gibson for 82 yards. Michigan State's total of 496 yards (307 in the first half) was the most allowed by a Michigan team since 1961. Michigan quarterback Rick Leach, who had only one interception in Michigan's first four games, threw three in the first half.

=== 1990: "No. One vs. No One" ===
"No. One vs. No One" was the tag line used for the 1990 game. Michigan came into the game ranked No. 1 in the country. With six seconds left, Michigan quarterback Elvis Grbac threw a touchdown pass to Derrick Alexander to make it 28–27 Michigan State. Michigan coach Gary Moeller elected to go for a two-point conversion for the win. Grbac threw an incomplete pass to Desmond Howard, but the play was controversial since a Spartan defender appeared to have interfered with Howard. A columnist in The Detroit News wrote: "Michigan State cornerback Eddie Brown had tripped him. No discussion. No debate. It was a clear and obvious foul that a million and one eyes in the stands and on national television could see, but somehow not one single referee in this joint managed to catch a glimpse of." The Wolverines then attempted an onside kick, which they recovered. Grbac scrambled and threw a Hail Mary that was tipped and intercepted to end the game.

=== 1997: Six interceptions en route to national championship ===
In 1997, ESPN College Gameday broadcast from East Lansing, as No. 5 Michigan defeated No. 15 Michigan State, 23–7. The Wolverines intercepted six Spartan passes, five off Spartan quarterback Todd Schultz. The interceptions included a one-handed catch by eventual 1997 Heisman Trophy winner Charles Woodson after which he managed to get one foot in bounds on the sideline. Marcus Ray had a pair of interceptions. Michigan completed the season undefeated and was recognized as the national champion in the AP Poll.

=== 2001: "Clockgate" and "Spartan Bob" ===
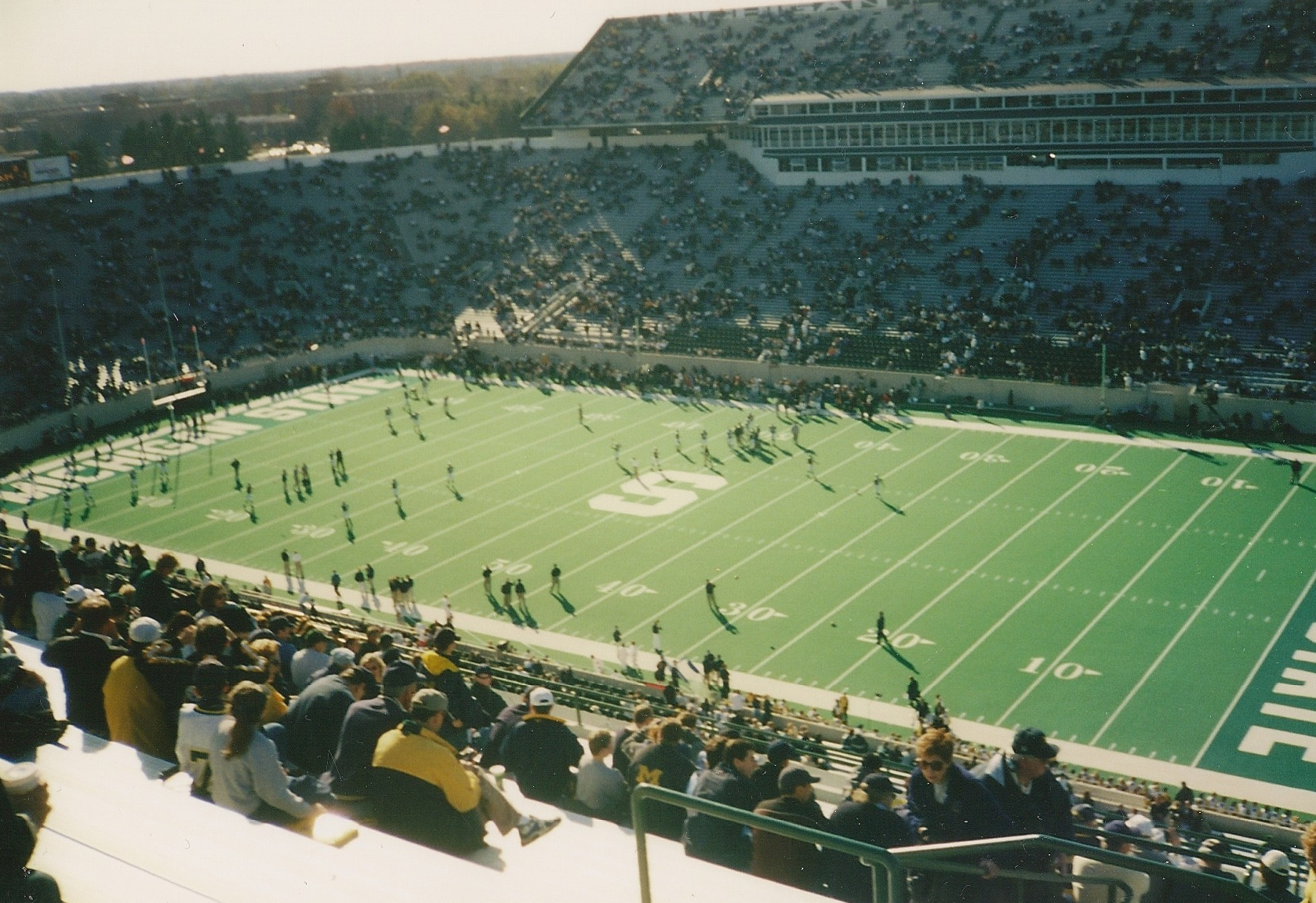
Michigan State warming up before the Michigan Wolverines vs. Michigan State Spartans football game at Spartan Stadium in 2001.

In the 2001 game, also known as "Clockgate", Michigan entered the game ranked No. 6 in the nation. With under three minutes left, the Spartans received the ball at midfield, trailing 24–20. A Michigan face mask penalty resulted in 15 yards and an automatic first down. Two plays later, the Wolverines were penalized for having 12 men on the field. Michigan State was incorrectly charged with their final timeout on that play; the Spartans should not have been because of the U-M penalty. With 17 seconds remaining, Michigan State quarterback Jeff Smoker attempted to scramble for a touchdown but was stopped at the one-yard line. The Spartans rushed to the line and spiked the ball, ostensibly with one second remaining on the clock. On the next play, Smoker threw a touchdown pass to T. J. Duckett to win the game, 26–24.

Michigan coaches, players, and the ABC broadcasters argued that the clock should have expired before the final play and that the timekeeper, "Spartan Bob" Stehlin, purposely stopped the clock before the ball was grounded. Dave Parry, the Big Ten conference's coordinator of football officials, said, "that play, as much as we've put that under a high-powered microscope, was correct. We could not prove that timer wrong." The Big Ten changed its timekeeping policy for the 2002 season, requiring that time be kept on the field by a neutral official.

=== 2004: Braylon Edwards leads the comeback ===
Despite being an underdog on the road in Ann Arbor, unranked Michigan State built up a 27–10 lead in the 4th quarter against #12 ranked Michigan. The Wolverines eventually awoke and added a 24 yard field goal by Garrett Rivas to cut the MSU lead to 14. Michigan recovered the ensuing onside kick and went down the field to make it a 27–20 MSU lead after a 36-yard touchdown reception by Braylon Edwards. Michigan's defense was able to force an MSU punt and once again, Edwards demonstrated late game heroics with an iconic 21-yard touchdown catch to knot the score at 27–27. Michigan scored 17 points in less than four minutes. A potential MSU game-winning field goal attempt fell short and the game went into overtime for the first time in series history. The teams traded field goals and touchdowns in the first two overtime periods, respectively. Another touchdown reception by Edwards and a successful two-point conversion put Michigan ahead, 45–37. MSU failed to answer with a touchdown and Michigan's comeback was complete with a 45–37 victory in triple overtime. Edwards amassed 189 yards receiving along with three touchdowns. Michigan's true freshman quarterback Chad Henne threw for 273 yards and four touchdowns.

=== 2007: The "little brother" game ===
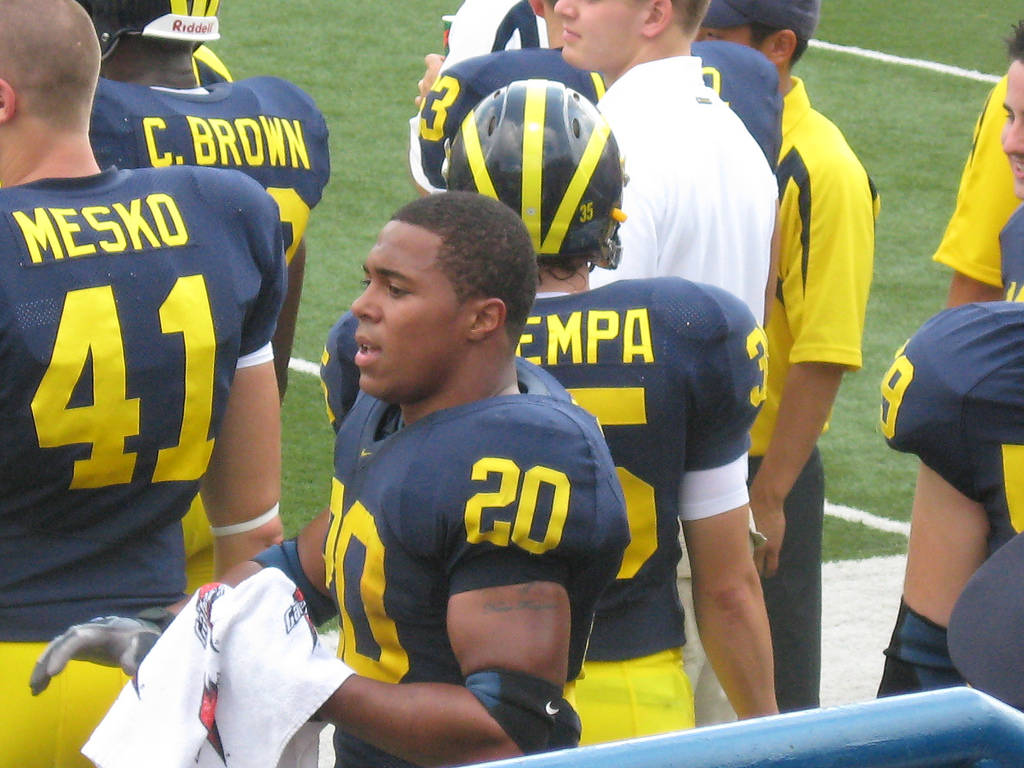
Mike Hart (20), coined the phrase "little brother" after the 2007 game.

The 2007 game marked Michigan's sixth straight win over Michigan State. The Wolverines once again narrowly won with a comeback in the fourth quarter, winning 28–24. Michigan quarterback Chad Henne led two touchdown drives in the final 7:35 of the game, completing touchdown passes to Greg Mathews and Mario Manningham, to lead the Wolverines back from a 24–14 deficit. Henne finished the game with 18 completions for 211 yards and four touchdowns, while Manningham had eight receptions for 129 yards and two touchdowns. After the game, the Michigan team held a "moment of silence" for Michigan State, a response to Michigan State head coach Mark Dantonio making a comment about taking a "moment of silence" for Michigan after their embarrassing upset loss to Appalachian State at the beginning of the season.

In a post-game interview, Michigan running back Mike Hart referred to the Spartans as the Wolverines' "little brother." "I was just laughing,” Hart said of Michigan State taking the lead. "I thought it was funny. They got excited. Sometimes you get your little brother excited when you’re playing basketball, and you let him get the lead, and then you come back and take it back." Mark Dantonio later responded to Hart's comment: "I find a lot of the things they do amusing. They need to check themselves sometimes. But just remember, pride comes before the fall... This game is an important game. So they want to mock us all they want to mock us, I'm telling them: it's not over. So they can print that crap all they want all over their locker room. It's not over. It'll never be over here. It's just starting... I'm going to be a coach here for a long time. It's not over. It's just starting.". After the "little brother" comment, Michigan State would go on to win 10 of the next 14 games against Michigan.

=== 2008: Dantonio's promise kept -- "Pride Comes Before The Fall" ===
In 2008, Michigan scored on a pass to running back Brandon Minor, who was only able to get one foot on a pylon. The pass was initially called incomplete, but the play was reviewed and incorrectly ruled a touchdown. During halftime, ABC-TV displayed the NCAA rule on the broadcast screen and concluded that the replay official was incorrect in awarding the touchdown to Michigan; ABC indicated officials on the field had been correct in originally ruling the play incomplete. The commissioner of the Big Ten later acknowledged that the call was wrong. The two teams traded touchdowns for much of the game before the Spartans finally pulled away in the fourth quarter, winning 35–21. Starting with the victory in 2008, Dantonio led the Spartans to victories in seven of the next eight games.

=== 2012: Gibbons' field goal as time runs out ===
In 2012, the Wolverines defeated the Spartans, 12–10, for the first Michigan victory since 2007. Michigan did not score a touchdown but kicked four field goals. Michigan led, 9–7, in the fourth quarter, but the Spartans ran a fake punt on fourth-and-nine from their own 30-yard line. The gamble paid off, and the Spartans kicked a field goal to go up 10–9. Michigan was forced to punt the ball away with four minutes left, but the Michigan defense forced a three-and-out and they got the ball back at their own 39 with 2:11 left. Denard Robinson completed a 20-yard pass on fourth down to advance to the Spartans' 25-yard line, With nine seconds left, Michigan spiked the ball and Brendan Gibbons lined up to kick a potential game-winning field goal. Mark Dantonio called time out to ice the kicker, but Gibbons split the uprights to win it for Michigan, 12–10. After the game, the students rushed the field in celebration. This was the 900th all-time win for the Wolverines, making them the first program to reach this level in college football history.

=== 2013: −48 rushing yards ===
On November 2, 2013, in East Lansing, Michigan State dominated Michigan defensively, winning 29–6. Michigan QB Devin Gardner was sacked seven times and Michigan accumulated the fewest rushing yards for a game in its entire history (−48 yards). The Spartans held the Wolverines to their lowest point total in the series since 1967, the last time Michigan State had won by more than 20 points. This was the second game in a row that Michigan failed to score a touchdown against Michigan State. This game marked MSU's fifth win of the previous six games in the series.

=== 2014: The stake game ===
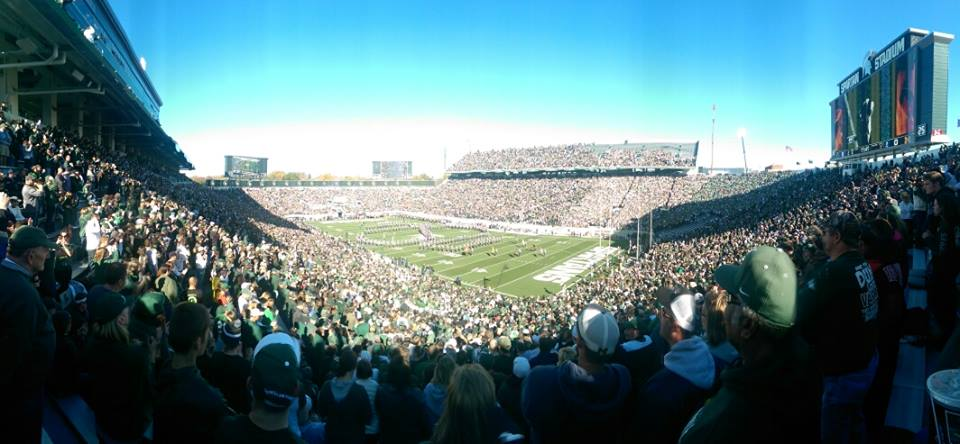
Spartan Stadium in 2014 vs. Michigan

On October 25, 2014, as they were coming onto the East Lansing field prior to the game, the Michigan team drove a stake into the turf, angering the Spartans. Michigan finally scored its first touchdown against MSU in three years with just 3:40 remaining in the game, but, after Michigan made the 2-point conversion, Michigan State marched downfield and scored a final touchdown with 0:28 remaining. This was notable because four of the previous six games ended with the Spartans taking a knee inside the Michigan red zone, instead of adding to the final score. In his postgame press conference, Mark Dantonio referenced the stake incident in explaining the decision to add a final touchdown. MSU won 35–11.

=== 2015: "Trouble with the snap" ===
On October 17, 2015, the game was played in Ann Arbor for the first time since 2012. The #12 Wolverines, led by first-year coach Jim Harbaugh, entered the game 5–1. The #7 Spartans came into the game 6–0. This was the first meeting of coaches Mark Dantonio and Harbaugh. Michigan scored first and did not trail until the final play of the game. Late in the 4th quarter, with the Wolverines leading 23–21, Michigan State drove into field goal range, but a sack pushed them outside the 40. They failed to convert on 4th and long, giving Michigan the ball and seemingly the victory. However, with 10 seconds left in the game, Michigan was faced with a 4th and short and decided to punt. Michigan State pressured with 11 defenders while Michigan sent 2 players downfield to cover the punt. The numeric mismatch on the line allowed easy penetration while the Wolverine long-snapper quick-snapped a low ball, which was bobbled by punter Blake O'Neill. The ball was picked up by Michigan State’s Jalen Watts-Jackson, who scored the game-winning touchdown at the last second. ESPN commentator Sean McDonough described the play as "unbelievable". The final margin of victory for MSU was 27–23. Michigan State did not lead at any point in the game until time expired, but they outgained Michigan in the contest 386 to 230 yards.

=== 2017: The first night game ===
On October 7, 2017, Michigan and Michigan State met for the first night game in series history. Michigan came into the game ranked No. 7 in the AP Poll and 4–0 on the season. The Michigan State Spartans came into the game unranked at 3–1 on the season, with their only loss at that point to Notre Dame in East Lansing. After an early Wolverine field goal, Michigan State quarterback Brian Lewerke ran 13 yards for a touchdown and later threw a 16-yard touchdown pass to Madre London to give the Spartans a 14–3 lead at halftime. The second half was played in heavy rain and winds. Michigan State forced five turnovers (two fumbles and three interceptions) in the game. Michigan scored a touchdown in the third quarter and attempted a Hail Mary pass in the closing seconds, but a deflection by MSU's Joe Bachie in the endzone cemented the Spartans' 14–10 win. The win was the Spartans' eighth in 10 games against Michigan. Michigan finished the season unranked, while Michigan State was ranked No. 15 in the final AP poll.

=== 2018: Pregame skirmish ===
On October 20, 2018, Michigan defeated Michigan State, 21–7. The Wolverines gained 395 yards and held the Spartans to 94 yards. The Spartans were late in conducting their traditional pregame walk down the field, and when they did so, several Michigan players had already taken the field for warmups as the Spartans had allowed them on the field early, consistent with what most Big Ten programs allow before a conference game. The Spartans walked, arms linked, through the Michigan players, resulting in a skirmish. After the Spartans left the field, Michigan linebacker Devin Bush tore up the Spartans' midfield logo with his cleats. After the game, Michigan coach Jim Harbaugh claimed the Spartans clothes-lined one Michigan player and ripped the headphones off another and added: "Total bush league. Apparently, coach Dantonio was five yards behind it all smiling." Michigan State coach Dantonio referred to Harbaugh's comments as "BS" as the Spartans have completed the walk for decades and every other team moved out of the way. The Big Ten issued reprimands to both teams afterwards, including a $10,000 fine against Michigan State, having found that the Spartans violated the conference's sportsmanship policy by walking across the field with linked arms and initiating contact with multiple Michigan players "who were legitimately on the field". The conference reprimanded Dantonio for "failing to take action to mitigate a foreseeable conflict from occurring", Devin Bush for grinding his cleats into the Spartan logo, and Harbaugh for his post-game comments.

=== 2020: Halloween upset ===
Due to the COVID-19 pandemic, the game was rescheduled and played on Halloween for the first time ever. Coming into the game, Michigan was ranked 13th in the AP poll after a dominating victory on the road against Minnesota 49–24, while Michigan State lost to Rutgers 38–27, a game that ended the Spartans' 19–game win streak in home openers and Rutgers' 21-game Big Ten losing streak dating back to 2017. Despite Michigan being 21.5 point favorites and ESPN's Football Power Index giving Michigan State just a 6.6% chance at winning, the Spartans beat the Wolverines 27–24 to reclaim the Paul Bunyan Trophy. This win also made Mel Tucker the first Michigan State head coach to beat Michigan in his first season since Nick Saban in 1995, as well as only the third head coach of either program to win his first game in the rivalry as head coach in the past 75 years (the others being Saban and Bennie Oosterbaan).

=== 2021: Undefeated top ten matchup ===
The October 30, 2021, matchup saw both schools ranked in the top 10 for the first time since 1964. Michigan was ranked at No. 6 in both the AP and Coaches poll, while Michigan State was ranked at No. 8 in the AP and No. 7 in the Coaches poll. This game was also unique in that both schools were 7–0 or better for the first time in history. After being down by a score of 30–14 in the third quarter, the Spartans outscored Michigan 23–3 to finish the game and pull out the 37-33 victory. Michigan State running back Kenneth Walker III ran for 197 yards and 5 touchdowns, becoming the player with the most rushing touchdowns in a single game against the Wolverines. The win also marked an MSU record with Mel Tucker becoming the first head coach to beat the Wolverines twice in his first two seasons.

=== 2022: Tunnel Fight ===
After a Michigan victory, Michigan defensive backs Gemon Green and Ja’Den McBurrows entered the Michigan Stadium tunnel alongside the MSU team and were assaulted by several Michigan State players. Accounts vary with MSU players maintaining Michigan players entered their locker room area before the fight broke out, which can be seen on several videos that started after the fight had begun. Chris Solari of the Detroit Free Press reported that he saw Michigan State players punching, shoving and kicking McBurrows. McBurrows reportedly sustained a nose injury. Khary Crump allegedly swung his helmet and struck Green, who sustained a concussion and facial cuts. Green dressed the following week for the Rutgers game but did not play. Michigan State suspended eight players following the incident. The Big Ten fined Michigan State $100,000 and additionally suspended Crump for the first eight games of the 2023 season. The Big Ten also reprimanded the University of Michigan for failing to “provide adequate protection for personnel of both home and visiting teams when entering and leaving playing arenas,” per conference policy after similar incidents had occurred previously in games against Penn State and Ohio State. On November 23, criminal charges were filed against seven Michigan State players. Khary Crump was charged with felonious assault and eventually sentenced to probation on a misdemeanor charge in exchange for a guilty plea; the other six entered a pre-plea diversion program for defendants accused of misdemeanors and had their records expunged after completion.

=== 2023: Scouting scandal, shutout in Spartan Stadium ===
Ahead of the 2023 game, the Big Ten warned Michigan State that it had "credible evidence" of successful sign-stealing by Michigan conducted by illegal advance scouting. After it was announced that Michigan was under investigation for in-person scouting of opponents in violation of an NCAA rule, Michigan suspended a staff member, Connor Stalions, who had purchased tickets for more than 30 games at 11 Big Ten schools. The ensuing NCAA investigation revealed that Stalions had attended the Michigan State-Central Michigan game earlier in the season. He was present on the Central Michigan sideline in disguise, to decipher Michigan State's signals. Michigan State was unable to signal in plays during the game and needed to have the Quarterback come over to the sideline or substitute a player in to send a play call in. Michigan shut out Michigan State, 49–0, the largest margin of victory in the rivalry in more than 75 years, dating to Michigan's 55–0 victory in 1947. Michigan later received penalties from the NCAA after the completion of its investigation, including a $30,000,000 fine and show cause penalties for several staff members, including Stalions and Jim Harbaugh.

== Accomplishments by the two rivals ==
As of January 4, 2025.

Team	Michigan	Michigan State
National titles	12	6
CFP appearances	3	1
Bowl appearances	54	30
Postseason bowl record	24–30	14–16
Rose Bowl appearances	21	5
Rose Bowl wins	9	4
Big Ten Championship Game Wins	3	2
Big Ten titles	45	9
Consensus All-Americans	88	33
All-time program record	1019–360–36	724–500–44
All-time winning percentage	.733	.588

== Game results ==
Michigan victories	Michigan State victories	Tie games

No.	Date	Location	Winner	Score
1	October 12, 1898	Ann Arbor	Michigan	39–0
2	October 8, 1902	Ann Arbor	Michigan	119–0
3	October 12, 1907	Ann Arbor	Michigan	46–0
4	October 3, 1908	East Lansing	Tie	0–0
5	October 15, 1910	Ann Arbor	Michigan	6–3
6	October 14, 1911	East Lansing	Michigan	15–3
7	October 12, 1912	Ann Arbor	Michigan	55–7
8	October 18, 1913	Ann Arbor	Michigan State	12–7
9	October 17, 1914	East Lansing	Michigan	3–0
10	October 23, 1915	Ann Arbor	Michigan State	24–0
11	October 21, 1916	Ann Arbor	Michigan	9–0
12	October 20, 1917	Ann Arbor	Michigan	27–0
13	November 23, 1918	Ann Arbor	Michigan	21–6
14	October 18, 1919	Ann Arbor	Michigan	26–0
15	October 16, 1920	Ann Arbor	Michigan	35–0
16	October 15, 1921	Ann Arbor	Michigan	30–0
17	November 4, 1922	Ann Arbor	Michigan	63–0
18	October 27, 1923	Ann Arbor	Michigan	37–0
19	October 10, 1924	East Lansing	Michigan	7–0
20	October 3, 1925	Ann Arbor	Michigan	39–0
21	October 9, 1926	Ann Arbor	Michigan	55–3
22	October 8, 1927	Ann Arbor	Michigan	21–0
23	November 17, 1928	Ann Arbor	Michigan	3–0
24	October 5, 1929	Ann Arbor	Michigan	17–0
25	October 4, 1930	Ann Arbor	Tie	0–0
26	November 14, 1931	Ann Arbor	Tie	0–0
27	October 1, 1932	Ann Arbor	Michigan	26–0
28	October 7, 1933	Ann Arbor	Michigan	20–6
29	October 6, 1934	Ann Arbor	Michigan State	16–0
30	October 5, 1935	Ann Arbor	Michigan State	25–6
31	October 3, 1936	Ann Arbor	Michigan State	21–7
32	October 2, 1937	Ann Arbor	Michigan State	19–14
33	October 1, 1938	Ann Arbor	Michigan	14–0
34	October 7, 1939	Ann Arbor	Michigan	26–13
35	October 5, 1940	Ann Arbor	Michigan	21–14
36	September 27, 1941	Ann Arbor	Michigan	19–7
37	October 3, 1942	Ann Arbor	Michigan	20–0
38	September 29, 1945	Ann Arbor	Michigan	40–0
39	November 9, 1946	Ann Arbor	No. 11 Michigan	55–7
40	September 27, 1947	Ann Arbor	Michigan	55–0
41	September 25, 1948	East Lansing	Michigan	13–7
42	September 24, 1949	Ann Arbor	Michigan	7–3
43	September 30, 1950	Ann Arbor	No. 19 Michigan State	14–7
44	September 29, 1951	Ann Arbor	No. 2 Michigan State	25–0
45	September 27, 1952	Ann Arbor	No. 1 Michigan State	27–13
46	November 14, 1953	East Lansing	No. 4 Michigan State	14–6
47	November 13, 1954	Ann Arbor	No. 20 Michigan	33–7
48	October 1, 1955	Ann Arbor	No. 2 Michigan	14–7
49	October 6, 1956	Ann Arbor	No. 2 Michigan State	9–0
50	October 12, 1957	Ann Arbor	No. 2 Michigan State	35–6
51	October 4, 1958	East Lansing	Tie	12–12
52	October 3, 1959	Ann Arbor	Michigan State	34–8
53	October 1, 1960	East Lansing	No. 13 Michigan State	24–17
54	October 14, 1961	Ann Arbor	No. 2 Michigan State	28–0
55	October 13, 1962	East Lansing	Michigan State	28–0
56	October 12, 1963	Ann Arbor	Tie	7–7
57	October 10, 1964	East Lansing	No. 4 Michigan	17–10
58	October 9, 1965	Ann Arbor	No. 4 Michigan State	24–7
59	October 8, 1966	East Lansing	No. 1 Michigan State	20–7
60	October 14, 1967	Ann Arbor	Michigan State	34–0

No.	Date	Location	Winner	Score
61	October 12, 1968	Ann Arbor	Michigan	28–14
62	October 18, 1969	East Lansing	Michigan State	23–12
63	October 17, 1970	Ann Arbor	No. 6 Michigan	34–20
64	October 9, 1971	East Lansing	No. 2 Michigan	24–13
65	October 14, 1972	Ann Arbor	No. 5 Michigan	10–0
66	October 13, 1973	East Lansing	No. 5 Michigan	31–0
67	October 12, 1974	Ann Arbor	No. 4 Michigan	21–7
68	October 11, 1975	East Lansing	No. 8 Michigan	16–6
69	October 9, 1976	Ann Arbor	No. 1 Michigan	42–10
70	October 8, 1977	East Lansing	No. 3 Michigan	24–14
71	October 14, 1978	Ann Arbor	Michigan State	24–15
72	October 6, 1979	East Lansing	No. 11 Michigan	21–7
73	October 11, 1980	Ann Arbor	Michigan	27–23
74	October 10, 1981	East Lansing	No. 6 Michigan	38–20
75	October 9, 1982	Ann Arbor	Michigan	31–17
76	October 8, 1983	East Lansing	No. 14 Michigan	42–0
77	October 6, 1984	Ann Arbor	Michigan State	19–7
78	October 12, 1985	East Lansing	No. 3 Michigan	31–0
79	October 11, 1986	Ann Arbor	No. 4 Michigan	27–6
80	October 10, 1987	East Lansing	Michigan State	17–11
81	October 8, 1988	Ann Arbor	No. 17 Michigan	17–3
82	October 14, 1989	East Lansing	No. 5 Michigan	10–7
83	October 13, 1990	Ann Arbor	Michigan State	28–27
84	October 12, 1991	East Lansing	No. 5 Michigan	45–28
85	October 10, 1992	Ann Arbor	No. 3 Michigan	35–10
86	October 9, 1993	East Lansing	Michigan State	17–7
87	October 8, 1994	Ann Arbor	No. 9 Michigan	40–20
88	November 4, 1995	East Lansing	Michigan State	28–25
89	November 2, 1996	Ann Arbor	No. 9 Michigan	45–29
90	October 25, 1997‡	East Lansing	No. 5 Michigan	23–7
91	September 26, 1998	Ann Arbor	Michigan	29–17
92	October 9, 1999‡	East Lansing	No. 11 Michigan State	34–31
93	October 21, 2000	Ann Arbor	No. 16 Michigan	14–0
94	November 3, 2001	East Lansing	Michigan State	26–24
95	November 2, 2002	Ann Arbor	No. 15 Michigan	49–3
96	November 1, 2003	East Lansing	No. 13 Michigan	27–20
97	October 30, 2004	Ann Arbor	No. 14 Michigan	45–37^{3OT}
98	October 1, 2005	East Lansing	Michigan	34–31^{OT}
99	October 7, 2006	Ann Arbor	No. 6 Michigan	31–13
100	November 3, 2007	East Lansing	No. 14 Michigan	28–24
101	October 25, 2008	Ann Arbor	Michigan State	35–21
102	October 3, 2009	East Lansing	Michigan State	26–20^{OT}
103	October 9, 2010	Ann Arbor	No. 17 Michigan State	34–17
104	October 15, 2011	East Lansing	No. 23 Michigan State	28–14
105	October 20, 2012	Ann Arbor	No. 23 Michigan	12–10
106	November 2, 2013	East Lansing	No. 22 Michigan State	29–6
107	October 25, 2014	East Lansing	No. 8 Michigan State	35–11
108	October 17, 2015‡	Ann Arbor	No. 7 Michigan State	27–23
109	October 29, 2016	East Lansing	No. 2 Michigan	32–23
110	October 7, 2017	Ann Arbor	Michigan State	14–10
111	October 20, 2018	East Lansing	No. 6 Michigan	21–7
112	November 16, 2019	Ann Arbor	No. 15 Michigan	44–10
113	October 31, 2020	Ann Arbor	Michigan State	27–24
114	October 30, 2021‡	East Lansing	No. 8 Michigan State	37–33
115	October 29, 2022	Ann Arbor	No. 4 Michigan	29–7
116	October 21, 2023	East Lansing	No. 2 Michigan	49–0
117	October 26, 2024	Ann Arbor	Michigan	24–17
118	October 25, 2025	East Lansing	No. 25 Michigan	31–20
119	November 7, 2026	Ann Arbor	Michigan State	15–6
Series: Michigan leads 75–39–5

‡ Hosted ESPN's College Gameday

== See also ==
- Michigan–Michigan State men's basketball rivalry
- Michigan–Michigan State men's ice hockey rivalry
- Michigan–Michigan State women's basketball rivalry
- Michigan–Michigan State men's soccer rivalry
- List of NCAA college football rivalry games
- List of most-played college football series in NCAA Division I
