= 2001 Silicon Valley Football Classic =

American college football game

Michigan State Spartans	Fresno State Bulldogs
(6–5)	(11–2)
44	35
Head coach: Bobby Williams	Head coach: Pat Hill
	AP / Coaches / BCS; 20 / 21 / NR
	1	2	3	4	Total
Michigan State	17	20	0	7	44
Fresno State	14	7	7	7	35
- Date: December 31, 2001
- Season: 2001
- Stadium: Spartan Stadium
- Location: San Jose, California
- MVP: Charles Rogers (WR, Michigan State); Nick Myers (DE, Michigan State)
- Referee: Clair Gausman (Mtn. West)
- Attendance: 30,456

United States TV coverage
- Network: FSN
- Announcers: Steve Physioc, Tom Ramsey, Eric Clemons

The 2001 Silicon Valley Football Classic was a post-season college football bowl game between the Michigan State Spartans and the Fresno State Bulldogs on December 31, 2001, at Spartan Stadium in San Jose, California. It was the second time the Silicon Valley Football Classic was played and the final game of the 2001 NCAA Division I-A football season for both teams. Michigan State defeated Fresno State 44–35.

Future NFL players David Carr, Jeff Smoker, Charles Rogers, TJ Duckett, and Bernard Berrian all played in this game.

== Scoring summary ==
Source.

Scoring summary

Quarter	Time	Drive			Team	Scoring information	Score	
Quarter	Time	Plays	Yards	TOP	Team	Scoring information	Michigan State	Fresno State
1	14:23	4	64	0:32	Fresno State	Charles Smith 5-yard touchdown reception from David Carr, Asen Asparuhov kick good	0	7
1	7:56	1	72	0:00	Michigan State	Charles Rogers 72-yard touchdown reception from Jeff Smoker, Michael Servis kick good	7	7
1	5:59				Michigan State	Fumble recovery returned 6 yards for touchdown by Monquiz Wedlow, Michael Servis kick good	14	7
1	3:39	5	80	2:03	Fresno State	Rodney Wright 39-yard touchdown reception from David Carr, Asen Asparuhov kick good	14	14
1	00:10	7	59	3:44	Michigan State	41-yard field goal by Michael Servis	17	14
2	9:24	10	75	2:36	Michigan State	T. J. Duckett 5-yard touchdown run, Michael Servis kick good	24	14
2	8:17	3	82	0:15	Fresno State	Rodney Wright 78-yard touchdown reception from David Carr, Asen Asparuhov kick good	24	21
2	5:25	6	52	2:09	Michigan State	T. J. Duckett 38-yard touchdown run, Michael Servis kick good	31	21
2	7:56	1	69	0:00	Michigan State	Charles Rogers 69-yard touchdown reception from Jeff Smoker, Michael Servis kick no good	37	21
3	7:02	11	83	3:42	Fresno State	Paris Gaines 2-yard touchdown run, Asen Asparuhov kick good	37	28
4	3:39	3	85	0:02	Fresno State	Paris Gaines 16-yard touchdown reception from David Carr, Asen Asparuhov kick good	37	35
4	1:56	7	78	3:58	Michigan State	Ivory McCoy 6-yard touchdown reception from Jeff Smoker, Michael Servis kick good	44	35
"TOP" = time of possession. For other American football terms, see Glossary of American football.							44	35

== Statistics ==
Statistic	MSU	FRES
First downs	23	25
Rushing yards	210	29
Passing yards	376	531
Passes (Att-Comp-Int)	32–22–1	58–35–2
Total yards	586	560
Fumbles-Lost	1–0	2–1
Penalties-Yards	8–64	6–30
Punts-Average	6–38.7	5–39.6
Punt Return Yards	2–3	3–27
Kickoff Return Yards	5–108	6–115
