= 2001 Michigan vs. Michigan State football game =

Michigan Wolverines	Michigan State Spartans
(6–1)	(4–2)
24	26
Head coach: Lloyd Carr	Head coach: Bobby Williams
AP / Coaches / BCS; 6 / 6 / 4
	1	2	3	4	Total
Michigan	3	14	0	7	24
Michigan State	7	7	3	9	26
- Date: November 3, 2001
- Season: 2001
- Stadium: Spartan Stadium
- Location: East Lansing, Michigan
- Referee: James Lapetina

The 2001 Michigan vs. Michigan State football game, sometimes called The Clock incident or Clockgate, was played on November 3, 2001 at Spartan Stadium.

While the game was closely played throughout, it is the game's conclusion that is most remembered. On fourth-and-goal, Michigan State quarterback Jeff Smoker threw a touchdown pass to running back T. J. Duckett as time expired to win 26–24. Smoker had spiked the ball with one second showing on the clock to allow the Spartans to have one last play.

== Lead-up to the game ==
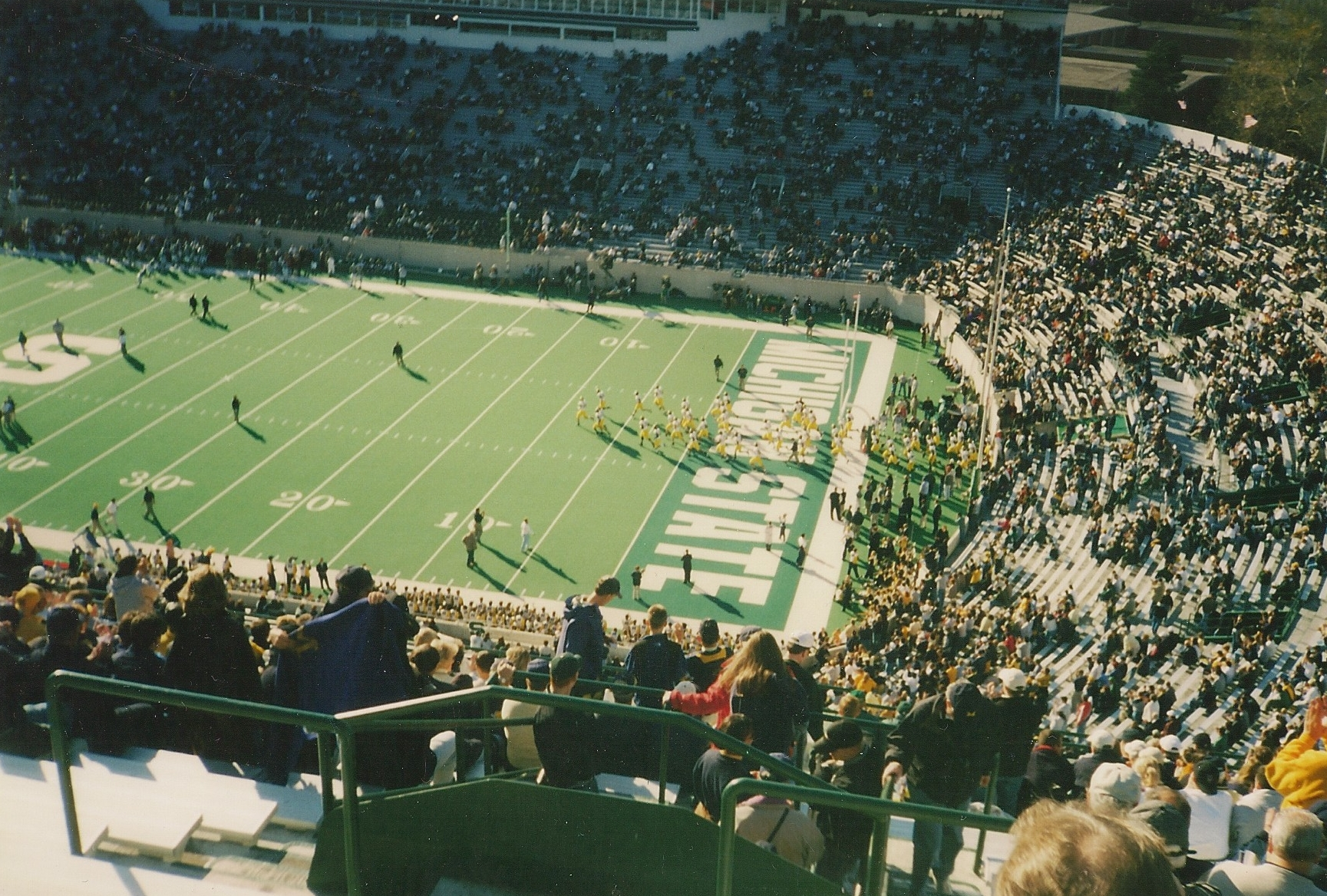
The Wolverines taking the field for pre-game warm ups.

The Wolverines came into East Lansing with a 6–1 (4–0) record and a #6 ranking behind wins against Miami (Ohio), Western Michigan, Penn State, Iowa, and eventual Big Ten champion Illinois. Michigan was the only team in the Big Ten without a loss four games into the Big Ten season, and despite an early non-conference loss at Washington, the Wolverines were considered national title contenders. Michigan led the Big Ten in rushing defense, conceding just 54.4 yards per game, but looked to be challenged by Michigan State running back T. J. Duckett, who averaged 105.5 rushing yards per game going into the contest. In the previous week, linebacker Larry Foote set a Michigan school record with 7 tackles for a loss against Iowa and seemed poised to put serious pressure on the Spartan offense.

The Spartans came into the contest 4–2 (2–2) with early losses at Northwestern and Minnesota but led the Big Ten in passing yards (271.3 yards per game) behind star sophomore wide receiver Charles Rogers and sophomore quarterback Jeff Smoker. The Spartans had won three of the previous four meetings against the Wolverines in East Lansing. It was coach Bobby Williams' first home game against the Wolverines. Kickoff return specialist and wide receiver Herb Haygood led the nation in kickoff return average (33.2 yards per return) and looked to give the Wolverines a serious challenge on special teams.

By kickoff time at 3:30 pm EST, the weather was partly cloudy with a temperature of 59 °F (15 °C) and the wind blowing from the west at 15 mph (24 km/h). The game was sold out to Spartan Stadium's capacity of 72,027 days in advance, and the final attendance was later announced as 75,262. ABC Sports carried the game live regionally with commentary from play-by-play announcer Brent Musburger, color commentator Gary Danielson, and sideline reporter Jack Arute.

== Scoring ==
=== 1st quarter ===
On the opening drive of the game Michigan State found itself in a fourth down situation on Michigan's 31 yard line and sent punter Craig Jarrett onto the field along with two wide receivers to attempt a fake punt. Although Jarrett's pass was incomplete, Michigan cornerback Marlin Jackson was flagged for pass interference for his coverage on Charles Rogers, which gave Michigan State a fresh set of downs and 15 extra yards. Two plays later, Smoker threw a 17-yard touchdown to Rogers in the back of the end zone to give the Spartans a 7–0 lead.

On the ensuing drive, Michigan kicker Hayden Epstein made a school-record 57-yard field goal to put the Wolverines on the board and cut the lead to 7–3.

=== 2nd quarter ===
At 12:07 of the 2nd quarter, Michigan took its first lead on a 14-yard touchdown pass from John Navarre to Marquise Walker, capping an eight-play, 67-yard drive and making it 10–7.

On 3rd and 4, 7:45 into the 2nd quarter, the Spartans were driving on the Wolverines 13-yard line. Smoker threw an incomplete pass to Rogers in the end zone, but Michigan was flagged for pass interference once again. The penalty gave Michigan State a first down with goal to go, and on the very next play, T. J. Duckett ran 2 yards up the middle for a touchdown that put the Spartans up 14–10.

The Wolverines struck back on the next series, as Walker caught a 32-yard touchdown pass to complete an 80-yard drive and give Michigan a 17–14 lead.

=== 3rd quarter ===
The only scoring in the 3rd quarter came courtesy of Michigan State kicker Dave Rayner, who kicked a 27-yard field goal with 12 seconds left in the quarter to knot the score at 17.

=== 4th quarter ===
With 7:33 left, Rayner hit another 26-yard field goal that gave Michigan State a 20–17 lead.

A Smoker fumble on the Michigan State 38 yard line was recovered by Michigan defensive tackle Grant Bowman with six minutes left. On the ensuing possession, Navarre threw a 20-yard touchdown to backup quarterback Jermaine Gonzales, who had lined up as a wide receiver, that gave the Wolverines a 24–20 lead.

== Final drive ==
With 2:28 left in the fourth quarter, Michigan was forced to punt from deep in its own zone. Hayden Epstein's kick was his shortest of the day, a 28-yarder that gave the Spartans excellent field position at the Wolverines' 44 yard line. On first and second down, Smoker was sacked for two of the Wolverines' school-record 12 sacks. Following an incompletion, the Spartans faced 4th and 16 from midfield.

On fourth down, Smoker's pass fell incomplete, but Michigan defensive back Jeremy LeSueur was flagged for grabbing the facemask of receiver Charles Rogers, giving the Spartans fifteen yards and an automatic first down. Two plays later, wide receiver Herb Haygood caught a pass over the middle for 17 yards and another first down.

On 1st and 10, Smoker was sacked again by the Wolverine defense and immediately used MSU's final timeout. During the timeout, the officials huddled and flagged Michigan for illegal participation for having 12 men on the field during the previous play. The referees incorrectly counted the down on the play, and also marked off the penalty from the spot of the sack (the 24) instead of the line of scrimmage (the 18), making it 2nd down and 4 yards to go from the 12 yard line, instead of 1st down and 1 yard to go from the 9 yard line. After an incompletion on the resulting 2nd down play, LeSueur broke up a 3rd down pass intended for Ziehl Kavanaght in the end zone to bring up 4th down. Facing 4th and 4, Smoker completed a slant up the middle to Duckett for 8 yards that resulted in a first and goal on the Michigan 3 yard line.

Michigan State rushed to spike the ball on 1st down, stopping the clock with 17 seconds left. On second and goal, Smoker rolled to the right and ran the ball down to the two yard line, but was tackled in-bounds, so the clock continued to run. With time running out, the Spartans frantically lined up to spike the ball; when they did so, the stadium clock showed a single second remaining. Michigan coaches, players, and the ABC broadcasters argued that the clock should have expired on the play and that the timekeeper, known as "Spartan Bob", purposely stopped the clock before the ball was grounded. Michigan radio commentator Frank Beckmann speculated that Michigan State had benefited from its home field advantage, even calling the unfolding controversy "criminal" on the air. On the ensuing play, Smoker lobbed a pass into the back of the end zone where it was caught by a wide open Duckett, giving the Spartans a 26–24 victory.

== Controversy ==
Debates on the last remaining second continue to this day. Some contend that clock operator Bob Stehlin, known colloquially as "Spartan Bob", stopped the clock before the spike play had actually concluded, to give the Spartans one more chance. Stehlin subsequently received threatening phone calls. Stehlin has stated that seven different media outlets timed the play and concluded that hundredths of a second remained.

Not all responses laid blame on the timekeeper. An editorial cartoonist at The Michigan Daily, the University of Michigan student newspaper, depicted the aftermath of the game with a Michigan player trying to explain to two referees that the clock ran out, but also holding a gun that he had used to shoot himself in the foot (implying that had they not made critical mistakes previously, the clock would have not been an issue).

== Fallout ==
Three years after the game, Big Ten officials told The Detroit News that, upon further review, the clock operator acted appropriately. Dave Parry, the conference's coordinator of football officials, said, "that play, as much as we've put that under a high-powered microscope, was correct. We could not prove that timer wrong."

To prevent the controversy caused by this game and others, the Big Ten changed its timekeeping policy for the 2002 season, having previously studied changing the policy prior to the Michigan–Michigan State game. Previously, the home team appointed an individual of their choosing to keep the official time in the press box. Now, time is kept on the field by a neutral official appointed by the Big Ten.

In addition to agreeing to change its policy on timekeeping, the Big Ten began a study on the feasibility of an instant replay system in 2003. In 2004, the Big Ten was the first conference to begin a trial replay system for all games played in conference stadiums. In 2005, most NCAA Division I-A teams had the option of using instant replay for their games after the NCAA approved the Big Ten's proposal to allow individual conferences to experiment with their own replay systems. Finally, in 2006, instant replay became standard across all NCAA Division I-A conferences.

== Records ==
- T.J. Duckett set a new Michigan State record for most rushing yards against Michigan (211), previously held by Lorenzo White with 185 yards.
- Hayden Epstein's 57-yard first quarter field goal was the longest field goal in Michigan team history as well as the longest ever given up by Michigan State.
- The 12 sacks recorded by the Michigan defense set a new school record for sacks in a game, surpassing the previous mark of nine set by the 1992 team.

== See also ==
- 2026 Western Michigan vs. Michigan football game
