= Morris Watts =

American football player and coach (1936–2026)

Biographical details
- Born: January 26, 1938; Seneca, Missouri, U.S.
- Died: May 6, 2026 (aged 88); Phoenix, Arizona, U.S.

Playing career
- 1958–1960: Tulsa
- Position: Running back

Coaching career (HC unless noted)
- 1961: Seneca HS (MO) (assistant)
- 1962–1964: Joplin HS (MO) (assistant)
- 1965–1971: Drake (OC/QB/WR)
- 1972: Louisville (OC/QB/WR)
- 1973–1981: Indiana (OC/QB/WR)
- 1982: Kansas (OC/QB)
- 1983: LSU (QB)
- 1984–1985: Birmingham Stallions (QB)
- 1986–1990: Michigan State (OC)
- 1991: Tampa Bay Buccaneers (QB)
- 1992–1994: Michigan State (AHC/OC)
- 1995–1998: LSU (OC)
- 1999–2002: Michigan State (OC)
- 2002: Michigan State (interim HC)
- 2003: Mississippi State (OC)
- 2007–2008: Broken Arrow HS (OK) (OC)
- 2009: Miami (OH) (QB)
- 2010: Miami (OH) (OC/QB)
- 2011–2013: Central Michigan (PGC/QB)
- 2014–2016: Central Michigan (OC/QB)
- 2017: Arkansas (analyst)
- 2018: Texas Southern (OC/QB)

Head coaching record
- Overall: 1–2

Morris Wayne Watts (January 26, 1938 – May 6, 2026) was an American football player and coach. Until his retirement in 2016, he was the offensive coordinator and quarterbacks coach at Central Michigan University. He previously served as the offensive coordinator at Miami University in Oxford, Ohio, having joined the RedHawks coaching staff in 2009 as the quarterbacks coach. Morris served as the interim head coach at Michigan State University for the last three games of the 2002 season after Bobby Williams was fired, compiling a record of 1–2.

Watts served three stints at the offensive coordinator at Michigan State (1986–1990, 1992–1994, 1999–2002) and was an assistant coach at Drake University (1965–1971), the University of Louisville (1972), Indiana University (1973–1981), the University of Kansas (1982), Louisiana State University (1983, 1995–1998), and Mississippi State University (2003). He coached quarterbacks for the Birmingham Stallions of the United States Football League (USFL) from 1984 to 1985 and for the Tampa Bay Buccaneers of the National Football League (NFL) in 1991. Before coming to Miami University, Watts spent two years at the offensive coordinator at Broken Arrow Senior High in Broken Arrow, Oklahoma.

== Coaching career ==
=== Michigan State ===
Watts was the offensive coordinator at Michigan State University for eight seasons during the George Perles era, from 1986 to 1990 and 1992 to 1994. He rejoined the Spartans as a member of Nick Saban's coaching staff and became the interim head coach in 2002 when Bobby Williams was fired after guiding a pre-season top 20 team to a 3–6 start. During his brief stint as interim head coach, he was 1–2. Following the season, he left the Michigan State football program for Mississippi State University. He also coached at Louisiana State University (LSU) as an offensive coordinator from 1995 to 1998.

=== Mississippi State ===
Watts showed his dynamism when he was hired at Mississippi State by saying at his introduction, "We want to be an offense that is balanced. Does that mean out of 100 plays we'll pass 50 times and run 50 times? No! We may throw 70 and run 30 or we may run 70 and throw 30. We'd like to spread the field and give our kids the best chance to win". In 2003, the Bulldogs were 2–10.

== Death ==
Watts died on May 6, 2026.

== Head coaching record ==
Year	Team	Overall	Conference	Standing	Bowl/playoffs
Michigan State Spartans (Big Ten Conference) (2002)
2002	Michigan State	1–2*	1–2*	T–8th	
Michigan State:		1–2	1–2	*Bobby Williams coached the first 9 games of the season.	
Total:		1–2			
