= Bobby Williams =

American football player and coach (born 1958)

Biographical details
- Born: November 21, 1958 (age 67); St. Louis, Missouri, U.S.

Playing career
- 1978–1981: Purdue
- Positions: Running back, defensive back

Coaching career (HC unless noted)
- 1982: Purdue (GA)
- 1983–1984: Ball State (RB/S)
- 1985–1989: Eastern Michigan (backfield)
- 1990–1999: Michigan State (RB)
- 2000–2002: Michigan State
- 2003: Detroit Lions (WR)
- 2004: LSU (WR)
- 2005–2006: Miami Dolphins (RB)
- 2007: St. Thomas Aquinas HS (FL) (assistant)
- 2008–2015: Alabama (TE/ST)
- 2016–2017: Alabama (special assistant)
- 2018: Oregon (ST)
- 2019–2021: Oregon (ST/TE)

Head coaching record
- Overall: 16–17
- Bowls: 2–0

Robert Vann Williams (born November 21, 1958) is an American football coach. Williams served as the head football coach at Michigan State University from 1999 to 2002, compiling a record of 16–17.

== Playing career ==
During his time at Purdue University, between 1978 and 1982, Williams was a four-year letterman for the Boilermakers football team and a captain in his senior season. He started for three years in the secondary, after spending his freshman season at running back. He graduated in 1982 with a degree in general management.

== Coaching career ==
After spending one season as a graduate assistant at his alma mater, Williams got his first coaching position as a running back and secondary coach at Ball State University, where he remained for two seasons. He spent the next five seasons as an offensive backfield coach at Eastern Michigan.

On December 6, 1999, Williams was named as the head football coach at Michigan State University. Williams coached the Spartans to a 37–34 win over Florida in the 2000 Citrus Bowl in his first game as head coach. In his first full season as head coach, the Spartans began their 2000 season 3–0, with wins over Marshall, Missouri, and Notre Dame, before losing four consecutive and finishing the season 5–6. The Spartans did improve in the following season, though were inconsistent, and finished the regular season 6–5, which included a win versus rival Michigan in the infamous "Clockgate" game. In the 2001 Silicon Valley Football Classic, Michigan State defeated Fresno State 44–35, finishing the season 7–5 and giving Williams his second bowl victory. With the victory, he became the first coach in Spartans history to win his first two bowl games. Nearing the end of his third season, Michigan State was 3–6 and last place in the Big Ten when the Spartans decided to fire Williams as head coach.

After leaving Michigan State, Williams went to the National Football League (NFL) as a wide receiver coach for the Detroit Lions. During his time with the Lions, he was reunited with wide receiver Charles Rogers, whom he had recruited and coached at MSU. After one season in the NFL, Williams returned to college as a wide receiver coach, as well as an assistant head coach under Nick Saban at LSU. After Saban left LSU for the Miami Dolphins, Williams followed him to become a running back coach for the team several months later. However, after two seasons with the Dolphins, Williams was fired at his position. On January 18, 2008, Williams again rejoined Saban at Alabama, accepting the position of tight end and special teams coordinator.

== Personal life ==
Williams is married to Sheila Williams. The couple has two children: a daughter, Nataly, member of the Theta Sigma chapter of Alpha Kappa Alpha sorority, and a son, Nicholas who is an offensive quality control coach with the New York Giants.

== Head coaching record ==
Year	Team	Overall	Conference	Standing	Bowl/playoffs	Coaches^{#}	AP^{°}
Michigan State Spartans (Big Ten Conference) (1999–2002)
1999	Michigan State	1–0 (Note: Nick Saban resigned as head coach at Michigan State following the end of the 1999 regular season. Williams succeeded Saban as head coach and led the Spartans to a victory in the Florida Citrus Bowl. Michigan State finished the season with an overall record of 10–2.)			W Florida Citrus	7	7
2000	Michigan State	5–6	2–6	T–9th			
2001	Michigan State	7–5	3–5	T–8th	W Silicon Valley		
2002	Michigan State	3–6*	1–4*	T–8th			
Michigan State:		16–17	6–15	*Fired after 9 games.			
Total:		16–17					
^{#}Rankings from final Coaches Poll.; ^{°}Rankings from final AP Poll.
