= Ronald Stanley =

American football player (born 1983)

No. 47
- Position: Linebacker

Personal information
- Born: March 6, 1983 (age 43); Saginaw, Michigan, U.S.
- Listed height: 6 ft 0 in (1.83 m)
- Listed weight: 244 lb (111 kg)

Career information
- High school: Saginaw
- College: Michigan State

Career history
- Pittsburgh Steelers (2005)*; San Francisco 49ers (2005)*; Pittsburgh Steelers (2005–2006)
- * Offseason or practice squad member only

Career statistics
- Games played: 1
- Stats at Pro Football Reference

Ronald Stanley (born March 6, 1983) is an American former professional football player who was a linebacker for three seasons with the Pittsburgh Steelers of the National Football League (NFL). He played college football for the Michigan State Spartans. He played in one game as a professional.

== Early life ==
A native of Saginaw, Michigan, Stanley attended Saginaw High School, where he was teammates with Charles Rogers on the football team.

== College career ==
Stanley attended Michigan State University and was a four-year starter for the Spartans. He was named a freshman All-American by several publications. Stanley finished his career with 368 tackles, which ranked sixth in school history. He was named the East's Most Valuable Player at the 2005 Hula Bowl after scoring two defensive touchdowns – a 38-yard fumble return and a 50-yard pick-six – in the 20–13 win over the West.

== Professional career ==
After going unselected in the 2005 NFL draft, Stanley was signed by the Pittsburgh Steelers as an undrafted free agent. He was released on September 2 – one day after their final preseason game – and joined the San Francisco 49ers practice squad the following month. Stanley was released by San Francisco on November 22 and re-signed with the Steelers in January 2006 during the playoffs.
