= Joey Harris =

American football player (born 1980)

No. 25
- Position: Running back

Personal information
- Born: December 18, 1980 (age 45); Houston, Texas, U.S.
- Listed height: 5 ft 10 in (1.78 m)
- Listed weight: 205 lb (93 kg)

Career information
- High school: Klein Oak (Klein, Texas)
- College: Purdue
- NFL draft: 2004: undrafted

Career history
- Carolina Panthers (2004); Greenbay Packers (2005)*
- * Offseason or practice squad member only

Career NFL statistics
- Rush attempts: 15
- Rush yards: 53
- Rush average: 3.5
- Stats at Pro Football Reference

Joseph Andreas Harris (born December 18, 1980) is an American former professional football player who was a running back in the National Football League. He played for the Carolina Panthers. He played college football for the Purdue Boilermakers.

== College career ==
Coming into his senior season in 2003, Harris was ruled academically ineligible.

== Career statistics ==
College statistics
Year	Team	Rushing					Receiving		
Year	Team	Att	Yards	Avg	Yds/G	TD	Rec	Yards	TD
2001	Purdue	58	255	4.4	21.3	3	9	67	0
2002	Purdue	250	1,115	4.5	85.8	8	12	185	1
2003	Purdue	Academically Ineligible							
Totals		308	1,370	4.4	54.8	11	21	329	1
