= Gilbert Gardner =

American football player (born 1982)

No. 51, 59, 54
- Position: Linebacker

Personal information
- Born: May 9, 1982 (age 44); Angleton, Texas, U.S.
- Listed height: 6 ft 1 in (1.85 m)
- Listed weight: 228 lb (103 kg)

Career information
- High school: Angleton
- College: Purdue
- NFL draft: 2004: 3rd round, 69th overall pick

Career history
- Indianapolis Colts (2004–2006); Tennessee Titans (2007); Detroit Lions (2008); Chicago Bears (2008)

Awards and highlights
- Super Bowl champion (XLI); Second-team All-Big Ten (2003)

Career NFL statistics
- Total tackles: 118
- Sacks: 1
- Interceptions: 1
- Stats at Pro Football Reference

Gilbert Ravelle Gardner, II (born May 9, 1982) is an American former professional football player who was a linebacker in the National Football League (NFL). He was selected by the Indianapolis Colts in the third round of the 2004 NFL draft. He played college football at Purdue.

Gardner earned a Super Bowl ring with the Colts in Super Bowl XLI over the Chicago Bears. He also played for the Tennessee Titans, the Detroit Lions and the Bears.

== Early life ==
Gardner attended Angleton High School in Angleton, Texas and was a letterman in football, baseball, and track. In football, he was a three-time All-District selection and a three-time All-County selection. Gilbert Gardner graduated from Angleton High School in 2000. He and his wife, Emily, have a son named Gilbert Ravelle Gardner III. Gilbert has returned to his roots and is a coach at his hometown Angleton High School.

== College career ==
At Purdue University, he started 31 of 46 games, recording 215 tackles with 3.5 sacks, 23 stops for losses, seven fumble recoveries, three forced fumbles, 11 pass deflections and three interceptions.

== Professional career ==
=== Indianapolis Colts ===
Gardner was selected by the Colts in the 3rd round (69th overall) of the 2004 NFL draft. He played for the Indianapolis Colts as a backup during the 2004 and 2005 seasons, eventually rising to starting LB by 2006. His 2006 season is remembered negatively by fans, as he was a key cog of the worst run defense in the league, until he was benched late in the season in favor of veteran LB Rob Morris. Gardner was released from the Indianapolis Colts on May 8, 2007.

=== Tennessee Titans ===
He was claimed off waivers by the Titans on May 9, 2007, and played one season with the team before becoming a free agent in 2008.

=== Detroit Lions ===
Gardner was signed by the Detroit Lions on March 25, 2008. During the first seven weeks of the season, Gardner appeared in two games for the Lions in a reserve role and recorded no tackles. He was placed on injured reserve on October 25 after the team signed linebacker Anthony Cannon. Gardner was released on November 5.

=== Chicago Bears ===
Gardner was signed by the Chicago Bears on December 12, 2008, after running back Garrett Wolfe was placed on injured reserve. He was released the following offseason on February 13, 2009.
