= Bill Miller (American football coach, born 1956) =

American football player and coach (born 1956)

Biographical details
- Born: June 1, 1956 (age 70); Hutchinson, Kansas, U.S.

Playing career
- 1974–1975: Hutchinson
- 1976–1977: UT Arlington
- Position: Linebacker

Coaching career (HC unless noted)
- 1978: UT Arlington (GA)
- 1979–1980: Oklahoma State (GA)
- 1981–1982: Drake (DB)
- 1983–1985: Nevada (DC)
- 1986–1988: Minnesota (DB)
- 1989–1994: Oklahoma State (DC)
- 1995–1998: Miami (FL) (DC)
- 1999–2002: Michigan State (DC)
- 2003–2004: Florida (AHC/LB)
- 2005–2006: Arizona State (DC)
- 2007: Western Michigan (DC)
- 2008: Louisville (LB)
- 2009: Kansas (co-DC/LB)
- 2011–2013: Minnesota (AHC/LB)
- 2014–2017: Florida State (LB)
- 2018: Kansas (LB)

Bill Miller (born June 1, 1956) is an American former college football coach. He served as defensive coordinator at Nevada, Oklahoma State, Miami (FL), Michigan State, Arizona State, Western Michigan, and Kansas.
