= Matthias Askew =

American football player (born 1982)

No. 96
- Position: Defensive tackle

Personal information
- Born: July 1, 1982 (age 44); Fort Lauderdale, Florida, U.S.
- Listed height: 6 ft 5 in (1.96 m)
- Listed weight: 302 lb (137 kg)

Career information
- High school: Dillard (Fort Lauderdale)
- College: Michigan State
- NFL draft: 2004: 4th round, 114th overall pick

Career history
- Cincinnati Bengals (2004–2005); Washington Redskins (2007–2008)*; Denver Broncos (2008–2009)*; Detroit Lions (2009)*; Toronto Argonauts (2011)*
- * Offseason or practice squad member only

Career NFL statistics
- Tackles: 5
- Stats at Pro Football Reference

Matthias Askew (born July 1, 1982) is an American former professional football player who was a defensive tackle in the National Football League (NFL). He was selected by the Cincinnati Bengals in the fourth round of the 2004 NFL draft. He played college football for the Michigan State Spartans.

Askew was also a member of the Washington Redskins, Denver Broncos, Detroit Lions and Toronto Argonauts.

== College career ==
Askew started 19 of 35 games during his career at Michigan State University, recording 144 tackles with seven sacks, 18.5 stops for losses, 24 quarterback pressures, an interception and eight pass deflections.

== Professional career ==
=== Cincinnati Bengals ===
Askew was selected in the 2004 NFL draft by Cincinnati after leaving college early to declare for the NFL draft. He was projected by many to be a possible first round pick the following year had he stayed in school.

The Bengals waived Askew during the 2006 preseason shortly after he was arrested for resisting arrest earlier in the summer. During the arrest he was tasered. Later he had brought suit against the city of Cincinnati, and charges were dropped.

=== Washington Redskins ===
On August 13, 2007, Askew signed with the Washington Redskins. However, he was released at the conclusion of the preseason on September 1 and spent the season out of football.

Askew was re-signed by the Redskins on March 17, 2008. He was released again during final cuts on August 30.

=== Denver Broncos ===
Askew was signed to the practice squad of the Denver Broncos on November 3, 2008. He was waived on September 4, 2009.

=== Detroit Lions ===
Askew was signed to the Detroit Lions practice squad on September 23, 2009.

=== Toronto Argonauts ===
On October 20, 2010, Askew signed a practice roster agreement with the Toronto Argonauts of the Canadian Football League. He was released by the Argonauts on June 8, 2011.

== Legal issues ==
In 2006, Askew was arrested after he refused to move his parked car out of an illegal parking spot. He was tasered by police during the incident. He is currently suing the city after the charges were dropped.
