= Will Whitticker =

American football player (born 1982)

No. 79
- Position: Offensive guard

Personal information
- Born: August 2, 1982 (age 44); Evansville, Indiana, U.S.
- Listed height: 6 ft 5 in (1.96 m)
- Listed weight: 338 lb (153 kg)

Career information
- High school: Marion (IN)
- College: Michigan State
- NFL draft: 2005: 7th round, 246th overall pick

Career history
- Green Bay Packers (2005); Miami Dolphins (2006); Washington Redskins (2007)*
- * Offseason or practice squad member only

Awards and highlights
- Second-team All-Big Ten (2004)

Career NFL statistics
- Games played: 15
- Games started: 14
- Stats at Pro Football Reference

William Whitticker (born August 2, 1982) is an American former professional football player who was an offensive guard in the National Football League (NFL). He played college football for the Michigan State Spartans and was selected by the Green Bay Packers in the seventh round of the 2005 NFL draft. He played fifteen games in his rookie NFL season and started fourteen of them, recording one fumble recovery but also seven false start penalties. He was released from the Packers before the 2006 NFL season and spent time on the Miami Dolphins and Washington Redskins rosters but did not play in any regular-season games.
