= Charles Rogers (wide receiver) =

American football player (1981–2019)

No. 80
- Position: Wide receiver

Personal information
- Born: May 23, 1981; Saginaw, Michigan, U.S.
- Died: November 11, 2019 (aged 38); Fort Myers, Florida, U.S.
- Listed height: 6 ft 3 in (1.91 m)
- Listed weight: 202 lb (92 kg)

Career information
- High school: Saginaw
- College: Michigan State (2001–2002)
- NFL draft: 2003: 1st round, 2nd overall pick

Career history
- Detroit Lions (2003–2005)

Awards and highlights
- Unanimous All-American (2002); Fred Biletnikoff Award (2002); Paul Warfield Trophy (2002); First-team All-Big Ten (2002); Second-team All-Big Ten (2001); Silicon Valley Football Classic MVP (2001); Michigan State Hall Of Fame (2021)

Career NFL statistics
- Games played: 15
- Games started: 9
- Receptions: 36
- Receiving yards: 440
- Receiving touchdowns: 4
- Stats at Pro Football Reference

Charles Benjamin Rogers (May 23, 1981 – November 11, 2019) was an American professional football player who was a wide receiver for three seasons in the National Football League (NFL). He played college football for the Michigan State Spartans, earning unanimous All-American honors and recognition as the top college wide receiver in the country. The Detroit Lions selected him with the second overall pick in the 2003 NFL draft, but he was out of the league after only three years due to injuries and off-field issues.

== Early life ==
Rogers was born and raised in Saginaw, Michigan. Rogers lived with his grandfather at age six while his mother served a one-year prison sentence and again during high school when his mother took a night job. At Saginaw High School, Rogers played on the football, basketball, and track teams. In football, he was a three-time all-state honoree. He won the state title in the 400-meter dash his senior year, beating fellow NFL player Carl Ford who finished in second place.

== College career ==
While attending Michigan State University, Rogers played for the Spartans from 2000 to 2002. He broke numerous receiving records. Rogers still holds the school records for most touchdowns in a career with 27, breaking the record held by former Spartans wide receiver and baseball legend Kirk Gibson, and the school record for most receiving yards in a single game with 270. He broke Randy Moss's NCAA record of 13 consecutive games with a touchdown catch. During Rogers' 2002 junior season, he had 68 receptions for 1,351 yards and 13 touchdowns, won the Fred Biletnikoff Award and Paul Warfield Trophy as the season's outstanding college football receiver, and was recognized as a unanimous All-American. His stock went up dramatically in his junior year when, in a game against Notre Dame, he outjumped two defenders to catch a Jeff Smoker pass in the back of the end zone, then managed to keep his left foot in bounds to score a touchdown.

== Professional career ==
Pre-draft measurables
Height	Weight	Arm length	Hand span	40-yard dash
6 ft 2 3/8 in (1.89 m)	202 lb (92 kg)	33 3/4 in (0.86 m)	8 7/8 in (0.23 m)	4.28 s
All values from NFL Combine

The Detroit Lions selected Rogers with the second overall pick in the 2003 NFL draft, one pick ahead of University of Miami wide receiver and future Pro Football Hall of Fame inductee Andre Johnson.

Rogers caught 22 passes for 243 yards and three touchdowns during his first five games of the 2003 season, before breaking his clavicle during a one-on-one drill with Dré Bly in practice, leaving him out for the season. On the third play of the 2004 season, against the Chicago Bears, Rogers suffered another broken clavicle, knocking him out for the season. He was so devastated by the injury that the Lions allowed him to go home for the remainder of the season. Years later, Lions general manager Matt Millen said that in hindsight, he made a mistake by letting Rogers be away from the team for an extended period of time.

Rogers was suspended for four games in 2005 for a third violation of the NFL's substance abuse policy. As a result of this violation, the Lions filed a grievance, claiming that his drug suspension violated a clause in his contract, which meant Rogers was obligated to return $10 million of the $14.2 million the Lions gave him in bonuses.

Upon his return from suspension, Rogers played only nine games, with three starts, and was declared inactive for four games. He caught 14 passes for 197 yards and one touchdown.

On September 2, 2006, Rogers was released by the Lions. New coach Rod Marinelli was not impressed with Rogers' humdrum effort during training camp; he said of Rogers' release, "We picked the men that are right for this football team. It's behind us." He worked out thereafter for the Miami Dolphins, New England Patriots, and Tampa Bay Buccaneers in 2006. However, he was not signed due to his 40-yard dash times of 4.8 seconds. At his peak, he ran the 40-yard dash in 4.4 seconds.

In October 2008, an arbitrator hired by the Lions ruled that Rogers had to repay the team $8.5 million. However, Rogers did not repay that money, and the Lions filed a lawsuit against him. In April 2010, U.S. federal judge Julian A. Cook ruled that Rogers had to pay $6.1 million of his signing bonus. In an interview in 2017, regarding the money owed the Lions, Rogers stated that he planned on filing for bankruptcy.

== Career statistics ==
=== NFL ===
Year	Team	GP	Receiving						
Year	Team	GP	Rec	Yds	Avg	Y/G	Lng	TD	FD
2003	DET	5	22	243	11.0	48.6	35T	3	13
2004	DET	1	0	0	—	—	0	0	0
2005	DET	9	14	197	14.1	21.9	35T	1	11
Total		15	36	440	12.2	29.3	35	4	24

=== College ===
Year	Team	GP	Receiving				Rushing			
Year	Team	GP	Rec	Yds	Avg	TD	Att	Yds	Avg	TD
2001	Michigan State	12	67	1,470	21.9	14	4	36	9.0	1
2002	Michigan State	12	68	1,351	19.9	13	6	74	12.3	0
Career		24	135	2,821	20.9	27	10	110	11.0	1

== Personal life ==
Rogers fathered eight children with four women. Two of the children were born before he graduated from high school. In April 2017, Rogers lived in Fort Myers, Florida and worked at an auto repair shop.

=== Prescription opioid addiction ===
Following the injuries he suffered during the early part of his career in Detroit, Rogers developed an addiction to the prescription medication containing an opioid Vicodin, which also contains acetaminophen, a product sold over-the-counter as Tylenol but is known to cause severe liver failure when taken in the dosages that were allegedly given to him by Lions team physicians.

=== Legal issues ===
Rogers tested positive for marijuana twice while at Michigan State, and a test at the NFL Scouting Combine detected excess water in his system. Rogers continued to smoke marijuana after his 2004 season-ending injury, which led to his 2005 suspension. In a 2009 interview with ESPN, he said that his hard living contributed to his downfall in the NFL.

In September 2008, Rogers was arrested and charged with assault and battery of his girlfriend, Naija Washington; the charges were later dropped. In December 2008, Rogers was sentenced to attend drug court or face jail time after violating his probation. In March 2009, Rogers was jailed for violating probation. On September 16, 2009, Rogers was arrested in Novi, Michigan for driving under the influence of alcohol after police found him unresponsive behind the wheel of his car. Rogers was arrested again in Novi on January 5, 2010, after he was found passed out from drinking at a restaurant, which was a violation of a sobriety court order; he was sentenced to 93 days in jail two days later.

== Death ==
On November 11, 2019, Rogers died in Fort Myers, Florida, at age 38 of liver failure. He had been diagnosed with cancer and was in need of a liver transplant.
