= Jeff Smoker =

American football player (born 1981)

No. 9, 12, 6
- Position: Quarterback

Personal information
- Born: June 13, 1981 (age 45); Manheim, Pennsylvania, U.S.
- Listed height: 6 ft 3 in (1.91 m)
- Listed weight: 225 lb (102 kg)

Career information
- High school: Manheim Central
- College: Michigan State
- NFL draft: 2004: 6th round, 201st overall pick

Career history
- St. Louis Rams (2004–2005); Philadelphia Eagles (2005)*; St. Louis Rams (2005); Kansas City Chiefs (2006)*; Nashville Kats (2007); Arizona Rattlers (2008)
- * Offseason or practice squad member only

Awards and highlights
- Second-team All-Big Ten (2003)

Career AFL statistics
- TD-INT: 89–28
- Comp-Att: 430–713
- Passing yards: 5,550
- Passer rating: 99.62
- Stats at ArenaFan.com

Jeff Smoker (born June 13, 1981) is an American former professional football quarterback. He was selected by the St. Louis Rams of the National Football League (NFL) in the sixth round of the 2004 NFL draft. He played college football for the Michigan State Spartans. He was also the starting quarterback for the Nashville Kats and Arizona Rattlers of the Arena Football League (AFL).

== College career ==
Jeff Smoker attended Michigan State University. While at Michigan State, he set many of the Spartans' passing records and when he finished his collegiate career he was the fifth leading passer-by-yards in Big Ten history.

Smoker appeared in two bowl games during his career, winning his first, and only, in the 2001 Silicon Valley Football Classic 44–35 against Fresno State as a sophomore in 2001. He lost his last bowl game against Nebraska with a score of 17–3 as a senior in the 2003 Alamo Bowl.

Smoker also played in the "Clockgate" game against the Michigan Wolverines on November 3, 2001. In the game Smoker threw the winning touchdown with one second remaining.

=== Substance abuse ===
Smoker was suspended for the last five games of the 2002 season by coach Bobby Williams due to a violation of team rules. It was later revealed that Smoker was dealing with substance abuse issues. His story and comeback was profiled in a front-page story in Sports Illustrated. Williams was fired toward the end of the 2002 season. Incoming coach John Smith reinstated Smoker in August 2003.

=== Michigan State passing records ===
Held the following Michigan State passing records:
Records that have been surpassed are marked with an *

Career records

- Passing yards: 8,932*
- Touchdown passes: 61*
- Pass attempts: 1,150*
- Pass completions: 685*
- 200-yard passing games: 23
- Interceptions: 39
- Passing yards per game (min 20 games): 217.9

Season records

- Passing yards: 3,395 (2003)
- Pass attempts: 488 (2003)
- Pass completions: 302 (2003)
- Passing efficiency rating (min 75 attempts): 166.4 (2001)
- Total offense yards per attempt (min 100 attempts): 7.35 (2001)
- Passing yards per game (min 5 games): (2003)*
- Passing touchdowns: 21 (2001, 2003)*

Single game records

- Pass attempts: 55 vs Ohio State (2003)
- Pass completions: 35 vs Ohio State (2003)

== Professional career ==
Pre-draft measurables
Height	Weight	Arm length	Hand span	40-yard dash	20-yard shuttle	Three-cone drill	Vertical jump	Broad jump	Wonderlic
6 ft 3 1/8 in (1.91 m)	223 lb (101 kg)	29 1/2 in (0.75 m)	9 7/8 in (0.25 m)	4.99 s	4.36 s	7.65 s	26.5 in (0.67 m)	8 ft 5 in (2.57 m)	23
All values from NFL Combine

=== St. Louis Rams (first stint) ===
Smoker was selected 201st overall in the sixth round of the 2004 NFL draft by the St. Louis Rams, he made the Rams' roster in his rookie year as the team's third-string quarterback. In his second year he was beaten out of that position by 2005 7th round draft pick Ryan Fitzpatrick and was cut from the Rams at the end of training camp.

=== Philadelphia Eagles ===
Smoker spent a brief time on the Philadelphia Eagles' practice squad in 2005.

=== St. Louis Rams (second stint) ===
He spent the 2005 season on the club's practice squad due to injuries to the Ram's starter Marc Bulger and his back-up, Jamie Martin. Due to the Rams' signing of former Miami Dolphins quarterback Gus Frerotte in the 2006 offseason, Smoker was cut from the Rams roster at the beginning of the 2006 training camp on July 26, 2006.

=== Kansas City Chiefs ===
On August 9, 2006, he was signed by the Kansas City Chiefs. Smoker was released on August 28.

=== Nashville Kats ===
Smoker was signed by the Nashville Kats of the Arena Football League (AFL) on November 17, 2006. He got his first start with the Kats on March 18, 2007, versus the Utah Blaze in Nashville. He replaced Clint Stoerner as the starting quarterback midway through the season and help lead the Kats to a 7–9 record, just barely missed the playoffs. He was released from the team at the end of the 2007 season.

=== Arizona Rattlers ===
Smoker was signed by the Arizona Rattlers, where he made his first starts after starter Lang Campbell went down with a sprained ankle. He was their starting quarterback until the league folded in 2009.

=== AFL statistics ===
Year	Team	Passing							Rushing		
Year	Team	Cmp	Att	Pct	Yds	TD	Int	Rtg	Att	Yds	TD
2007	Nashville	253	419	60.4	3,447	57	17	103.78	13	8	3
2008	Arizona	177	294	60.2	2,103	32	11	93.68	11	26	2
Career		430	713	60.3	5,550	89	28	99.62	24	34	5
