= T. J. Duckett =

American football player (born 1981)

No. 45, 36, 42
- Position: Running back

Personal information
- Born: February 17, 1981 (age 45); Kalamazoo, Michigan, U.S.
- Listed height: 6 ft 0 in (1.83 m)
- Listed weight: 261 lb (118 kg)

Career information
- High school: Loy Norrix High School (Kalamazoo)
- College: Michigan State
- NFL draft: 2002: 1st round, 18th overall pick

Career history
- Atlanta Falcons (2002–2005); Washington Redskins (2006); Detroit Lions (2007); Seattle Seahawks (2008)

Awards and highlights
- 2× Second-team All-Big Ten (2000, 2001)

Career NFL statistics
- Rushing attempts: 717
- Rushing yards: 2,814
- Rushing touchdowns: 44
- Receptions: 35
- Receiving yards: 303
- Stats at Pro Football Reference

Todd Jeffery Duckett (born February 17, 1981) is an American former professional football player who was a running back in the National Football League (NFL). He played college football for the Michigan State Spartans. Duckett was selected by the Atlanta Falcons in the first round of the 2002 NFL draft with the 18th overall pick. He also played in the NFL for the Washington Redskins, Detroit Lions and Seattle Seahawks.

== Early life ==
Duckett participated in track & field, where he was a three-time state Class-A shot put champion. He held the state record in the shot put, from 1999 until 2016, at 20.42 meters (67 ft). In sprints, he was a member of the 4 × 100 m relay (42.59s) team and recorded a personal-best time of 10.6 seconds in the 100-meter dash. He was also timed at 4.37 seconds in the 40-yard dash and bench pressed 515 pounds.

== Professional career ==
=== Seattle Seahawks ===
On March 4, 2008, the Seattle Seahawks signed Duckett to a five-year contract worth $14 million. He served as a short-yardage back for the Seahawks. Duckett scored a touchdown on a one-yard run on September 14, 2008. Before the game, his number was changed from 45 to 42.

=== NFL statistics ===
Rushing Stats

Year	Team	Games	Carries	Yards	Yards per carry	Longest carry	Touchdowns	First downs	Fumbles	Fumbles lost
2002	ATL	12	130	507	3.9	33	4	28	0	0
2003	ATL	16	197	779	4.0	55	11	39	3	2
2004	ATL	13	104	509	4.9	35	8	30	2	2
2005	ATL	14	121	380	3.1	25	8	24	2	2
2006	WSH	10	38	132	3.5	19	2	9	1	0
2007	DET	12	65	335	5.2	53	3	16	1	0
2008	SEA	16	62	172	2.8	29	8	26	0	0
Career		93	717	2,814	3.9	55	44	172	9	6

Receiving Stats

Year	Team	Games	Receptions	Yards	Yards per Reception	Longest Reception	Touchdowns	First Downs	Fumbles	Fumbles Lost
2002	ATL	12	9	61	6.8	20	0	3	0	0
2003	ATL	16	11	94	8.5	21	0	2	0	0
2004	ATL	13	3	15	5.0	11	0	1	0	0
2005	ATL	14	6	63	10.5	19	0	3	0	0
2006	WSH	10	2	16	8.0	19	0	1	0	0
2007	DET	12	4	54	13.5	22	0	4	0	0
Career		77	35	303	8.7	22	0	14	0	0

== Personal life ==
In 2012, he started a nonprofit printing company for t-shirts and other clothing items. In 2017, he started New World Flood, a non-profit organization that goes into schools and teaches kids how they can start a flood of community service and kind acts in their school, town, city, and world.

Duckett's cousin Mazi Smith plays defensive tackle in the NFL.
