= 2000 Michigan Wolverines football team =

American college football season

2000 Michigan Wolverines football

Big Ten co-champion Florida Citrus Bowl champion

Florida Citrus Bowl, W 31–28 vs. Auburn
- Conference: Big Ten Conference

Ranking
- Coaches: No. 10
- AP: No. 11
- Record: 9–3 (6–2 Big Ten)
- Head coach: Lloyd Carr (6th season)
- Offensive coordinator: Stan Parrish (1st season)
- Offensive scheme: Multiple
- Defensive coordinator: Jim Herrmann (4th season)
- Base defense: Multiple
- MVP: Anthony Thomas
- Captains: Steve Hutchinson; Anthony Thomas; James Whitley; Eric Wilson
- Home stadium: Michigan Stadium

2000 Big Ten Conference football standings
	Conf.			Overall
Team	W		L	W		L
No. 11 Michigan +	6	–	2	9	–	3
Northwestern +	6	–	2	8	–	4
No. 13 Purdue $+	6	–	2	8	–	4
Ohio State	5	–	3	8	–	4
No. 23 Wisconsin	4	–	4	9	–	4
Minnesota	4	–	4	6	–	6
Penn State	4	–	4	5	–	7
Iowa	3	–	5	3	–	9
Illinois	2	–	6	5	–	6
Michigan State	2	–	6	5	–	6
Indiana	2	–	6	3	–	8
$ – BCS representative as conference champion; + – Conference co-champions; Rankings from AP Poll

The 2000 Michigan Wolverines football team was an American football team that represented the University of Michigan as a member of the Big Ten Conference during the 2000 NCAA Division I-A football season. In their sixth year under head coach Lloyd Carr, the Wolverines compiled a 9–3 record (6–2 in conference games), outscored opponents by a total of 373 to 201, and finished in a three-way tie for the Big Ten championship. They defeated Auburn in the Florida Citrus Bowl and were ranked No. 11 in the final AP poll.

The team's statistical leaders included quarterback Drew Henson with 1,852 passing yards, running back Anthony Thomas with 1,551 rushing yards and 102 points scored, and wide receiver David Terrell.

Offensive tackle Steve Hutchinson won the Jim Parker Trophy as the top collegiate offensive lineman and was a unanimous first-team All-American. David Terrell also received first-team All-America honors from some selectors. Five Michigan players received first-team honors on the 2000 All-Big Ten Conference football team: Thomas (Coaches-1, Media-1); Terrell (Coaches-1, Media-1); Hutchinson (Coaches-1, Media-1); tackle Jeff Backus (Coaches-1, Media-1); and linebacker Larry Foote (Coaches-1, Media-2).

== Schedule ==
Date	Time	Opponent	Rank	Site	TV	Result	Attendance	Source
September 2	12:00 p.m.	Bowling Green*	No. 6	Michigan Stadium; Ann Arbor, MI	ESPN Plus	W 42–7	110,585	
September 9	12:00 p.m.	Rice*	No. 3	Michigan Stadium; Ann Arbor, MI	ESPN Plus	W 38–7	109,778	
September 16	3:30 p.m.	at No. 14 UCLA*	No. 3	Rose Bowl; Pasadena, CA	ABC	L 20–23	88,044	
September 23	7:45 p.m.	at No. 19 Illinois	No. 10	Memorial Stadium; Champaign, IL (rivalry)	ESPN	W 35–31	72,524	
September 30	12:00 p.m.	No. 17 Wisconsin	No. 9	Michigan Stadium; Ann Arbor, MI (College GameDay)	ABC	W 13–10	111,341	
October 7	3:30 p.m.	at Purdue	No. 6	Ross–Ade Stadium; West Lafayette, IN	ABC	L 31–32	68,340	
October 14	3:30 p.m.	Indiana^{†}	No. 18	Michigan Stadium; Ann Arbor, MI	ABC	W 58–0	110,909	
October 21	3:30 p.m.	Michigan State	No. 16	Michigan Stadium; Ann Arbor, MI (rivalry)	ABC	W 14–0	111,514	
November 4	3:30 p.m.	at No. 21 Northwestern	No. 12	Ryan Field; Evanston, IL (rivalry)	ABC	L 51–54	47,130	
November 11	12:00 p.m.	Penn State	No. 20	Michigan Stadium; Ann Arbor, MI	ESPN	W 33–11	110,803	
November 18	12:00 p.m.	at No. 12 Ohio State	No. 19	Ohio Stadium; Columbus, OH (The Game)	ABC	W 38–26	98,568	
January 1, 2001	1:00 p.m.	vs. No. 20 Auburn*	No. 17	Florida Citrus Bowl; Orlando, FL (Florida Citrus Bowl)	ABC	W 31–28	66,928	
*Non-conference game; ^{†}Homecoming; Rankings from AP Poll released prior to the game; All times are in Eastern time

== Rankings ==
Ranking movements Legend: ██ Increase in ranking ██ Decrease in ranking — = Not ranked ( ) = First-place votes
	Week																
Poll	Pre	1	2	3	4	5	6	7	8	9	10	11	12	13	14	15	Final
AP	6	6	3	3 (1)	10	9	6	18	16	15	12	20	19	16	16	17	11
Coaches Poll	4	4	3	3	10	9	6	17	16	15	12	21	18	16	16	15	10
BCS	Not released									—	12	—	—	15	16	16	Not released

== Game summaries ==
=== Bowling Green ===
Team	1	2	3	4	Total
Bowling Green	0	0	0	7	7
• Michigan	7	14	0	21	42

- Date: September 2
- Location: Michigan Stadium, Ann Arbor, Michigan
- TV announcers (ESPN+): Craig Coshun (play-by-play) & Bob Valesente (color)

Scoring summary
1	1:16	MICH	David Terrell 41 yard pass from John Navarre (Hayden Epstein kick)	Michigan 7–0
2	11:23	MICH	Ronald Bellamy 19 yard pass from John Navarre (Hayden Epstein kick)	Michigan 14–0
2	7:58	MICH	Ronald Bellamy 11 yard pass from John Navarre (Hayden Epstein kick)	Michigan 21–0
4	14:19	MICH	Marquise Walker 4 yard pass from John Navarre (Hayden Epstein kick)	Michigan 28–0
4	12:41	MICH	Anthony Thomas 28 yard run (Hayden Epstein kick)	Michigan 35–0
4	5:21	BGSU	Andre Pinchem 24 yard pass from Andy Sahm (Mike Knapp kick)	Michigan 35–7
4	3:02	MICH	Chris Perry 42 yard run (Hayden Epstein kick)	Michigan 42–7

=== Rice ===
Team	1	2	3	4	Total
Rice	0	0	0	7	7
• Michigan	28	7	3	0	38

- Date: September 9
- Location: Michigan Stadium, Ann Arbor, Michigan
- TV announcers (ESPN+): Wayne Larrivee (play-by-play), Randy Wright (color) & Jim Barbar (sideline)

=== UCLA ===
Team	1	2	3	4	Total
Michigan	6	7	7	0	20
• UCLA	0	3	14	6	23

- Date: September 16
- Location: Rose Bowl, Pasadena, California
- TV announcers (ABC): Keith Jackson (play-by-play), Tim Brant (color) & Todd Harris (sideline)

=== Illinois ===
Team	1	2	3	4	Total
• Michigan	7	0	7	21	35
Illinois	0	14	10	7	31

- Date: September 23
- Location: Memorial Stadium, Champaign, Illinois
- TV announcers (ESPN): Ron Franklin (play-by-play), Mike Gottfried (color) & Adrian Karsten (sideline)

=== Wisconsin ===
Team	1	2	3	4	Total
Wisconsin	3	0	0	7	10
• Michigan	0	3	3	7	13

- Date: September 30
- Location: Michigan Stadium, Ann Arbor, Michigan
- TV announcers (ABC): Brent Musburger (play-by-play), Gary Danielson (color) & Jack Arute (sideline)

Scoring summary
Q1	4:26	WIS	Vitaly Pisetsky 49 yard field goal	WIS 3–0
Q2	:04	MICH	Jeff Del Verne 33 yard field goal	Tie 3–3
Q3	7:31	MICH	Jeff Del Verne 33 yard field goal	MICH 6–3
Q4	12:10	WIS	Chad Kuhns 5 yard pass from Brooks Bollinger (Vitaly Pisetsky kick)	WIS 10–6
Q4	6:42	MICH	David Terrell 15 yard pass from Drew Henson (Jeff Del Verne kick)	MICH 13–10

=== Purdue ===
Team	1	2	3	4	Total
Michigan	7	21	0	3	31
• Purdue	3	7	13	9	32

- Date: October 7
- Location: Ross–Ade Stadium, West Lafayette, Indiana
- TV announcers (ABC): Brent Musburger (play-by-play), Gary Danielson (color) & Jack Arute (sideline)

=== Indiana ===
Team	1	2	3	4	Total
Indiana	0	0	0	0	0
• Michigan	10	35	7	6	58

- Date: October 14
- Location: Michigan Stadium, Ann Arbor, Michigan
- Game attendance: 110,909
- TV announcers (ABC): Brad Nessler (play-by-play), Bob Griese (color) & Lynn Swann (sideline)

=== Michigan State ===
Team	1	2	3	4	Total
Michigan State	0	0	0	0	0
• Michigan	7	0	7	0	14

- Date: October 21
- Location: Michigan Stadium, Ann Arbor, Michigan
- Game attendance: 111,514
- TV announcers (ABC): Brent Musburger (play-by-play), Gary Danielson (color) & Jack Arute (sideline)

Scoring summary
Q1	10:31	MICH	Thomas 1 yard run (Del Verne kick)	MICH 7–0
Q3	7:27	MICH	Thomas 30 yard run (Del Verne kick)	MICH 14–0

- Anthony Thomas 25 rush, 175 yds

=== Northwestern ===
Team	1	2	3	4	Total
Michigan	14	14	17	6	51
• Northwestern	7	16	13	18	54

- Date: November 4
- Location: Ryan Field, Evanston, Illinois
- TV announcers (ABC): Brent Musburger (play-by-play), Gary Danielson (color) & Jack Arute (sideline)

=== Penn State ===
Team	1	2	3	4	Total
Penn State	3	0	0	8	11
• Michigan	0	17	3	13	33

- Date: November 11
- Location: Michigan Stadium, Ann Arbor, Michigan
- Game attendance: 110,803
- TV announcers (ESPN): Steve Levy (play-by-play), Todd Christensen (color) & Dave Ryan (sideline)

Scoring summary
Q1	2:55	PSU	Primanti 35 yard field goal	PSU 3–0
Q2	9:36	MICH	Thomas 7 yard run (Epstein kick)	MICH 7–3
Q2	1:32	MICH	Seymour 15 yard pass from Henson (Epstein kick)	MICH 14–3
Q2	:23	MICH	Epstein 33 yard field goal	MICH 17–3
Q3	5:10	MICH	Epstein 31 yard field goal	MICH 20–3
Q4	14:14	MICH	Askew 40 yard pass from Henson (Epstein kick)	MICH 27–3
Q4	9:23	PSU	Johnson 50 yard pass from Seneca (Drummond pass from Seneca)	MICH 27–11
Q4	:01	MICH	Perry 1 yard run (kick failed)	MICH 33–11

=== Ohio State ===
Team	1	2	3	4	Total
• Michigan	14	0	17	7	38
Ohio State	9	3	0	14	26

- Date: November 18
- Location: Ohio Stadium, Columbus, Ohio
- TV announcers (ABC): Brad Nessler (play-by-play), Bob Griese (color) & Lynn Swann (sideline)

Scoring summary
Q1	13:03	OHST	Wells 1 yard run (kick failed)	OHST 6–0
Q1	11:02	OHST	Stultz 37 yard field goal	OHST 9–0
Q1	9:16	MICH	Thomas 70 yard pass from Henson (Epstein kick)	OHST 9–7
Q1	7:14	MICH	Terrell 21 yard pass from Henson (Epstein kick)	MICH 14–9
Q2	:00	OHST	Stultz 26 yard field goal	MICH 14–12
Q3	10:28	MICH	Terrell 32 yard pass from Henson (Epstein kick)	MICH 21–12
Q3	6:07	MICH	Epstein 25 yard field goal	MICH 24–12
Q3	4:15	MICH	Curry 50 yard interception return (Epstein kick)	MICH 31–12
Q4	10:20	OHST	Wells 2 yard run (Stultz kick)	MICH 31–19
Q4	7:03	OHST	Rambo 18 yard pass from Bellisari (Stultz kick)	MICH 31–26
Q4	1:18	MICH	Henson 1 yard run (Epstein kick)	MICH 38–26

- Drew Henson 14/25, 303 yds

=== Florida Citrus Bowl ===
Team	1	2	3	4	Total
Auburn	0	14	7	7	28
• Michigan	7	14	10	0	31

- Date: January 1
- Location: Florida Citrus Bowl Stadium, Orlando, Florida
- Game attendance: 66,928
- TV announcers (ABC): Sean Grande (play-by-play) & David Norrie (color)

Scoring summary
Q1	6:27	MICH	Terrell 31 yard pass from Henson (Epstein kick)	MICH 7–0
Q2	14:17	AUB	Daniels 19 yard pass from Leard (Duval kick)	Tie 7–7
Q2	11:04	AUB	Robinson 20 yard pass from Leard (Duval kick)	AUB 14–7
Q2	6:41	MICH	Askew 4 yard pass from Henson (Epstein kick)	Tie 14–14
Q2	:54	MICH	Thomas 11 yard run (Epstein kick)	MICH 21–14
Q3	6:51	MICH	Thomas 25 yard run (Epstein kick)	MICH 28–14
Q3	4:08	AUB	Johnson 12 yard run (Duval kick)	MICH 28–21
Q3	1:35	MICH	Epstein 41 yard field goal	MICH 31–21
Q4	2:26	AUB	Green 21 yard pass from Leard (Duval kick)	MICH 31–28

- Anthony Thomas 32 rush, 182 yds
- David Terrell 4 rec, 136 yds
- Marquise Walker 4 rec, 100 yds

== Statistical achievements ==
David Terrell was the Big Ten receiving yardage champion for all games with 94.2 yards per game. The team led the Big Ten in passing efficiency for conference games (148.0) and all games (155.3). They led the conference in turnover margin (+1.13, co-leader with Northwestern) in conference games and (+1.08) in all games.

Anthony Thomas set several school records: single-season carries (319), eclipsing the 303 mark by Tim Biakabutuka set five years earlier and broken three years later by Chris Perry; career carries (924), breaking Jamie Morris' thirteen-year-old record of 809 and broken seven years later by Mike Hart; career yards (4472), also breaking Jamie Morris' thirteen-year-old record of 4393 and broken seven years later by Hart; career rushing touchdowns (52), breaking Tyrone Wheatley's six-year-old record of 47 and still standing; single season yards per game (144.4), eclipsing Morris' 141.9 from 1987 and still standing; single-season 150-yard games (6), surpassing Morris and Rob Lytle who had 5 in 1987 and 1976, respectively; career 100-yard games (22) eclipsing Wheatley's 20 in 1994 and surpassed by Hart in 2007; career 150-yard games (9), surpassing Morris' 7 set in 1987 and surpassed by Hart in 2007. Drew Henson ended his career with the current school record for lowest interception percentage (1.87), surpassing Michael Taylor's 2.55 set in 1989. Terrell broke Amani Toomer's single season reception yards record of 1096 by posting 1130 yards, but Marquise Walker surpassed this record the following season.

== Players ==
=== Roster ===
2000 Michigan Wolverines football team roster
Players
Coaches
Offense

Pos.	#	Name	Class
OL	71	Kurt Anderson	Sr
OT	79	Jeff Backus	Sr
WR	19	Ronald Bellamy	So
C	65	David Brandt	Sr
OL	65	Andy Brown	So
WR	9	Tyrece Butler	So
QB	18	Jermaine Gonzales	Fr
OL	78	Jonathan Goodwin	Sr
QB	7	Drew Henson	So
G	76	Steve Hutchinson	Sr
QB	16	John Navarre	Fr
TE	81	Bill Seymour	Sr
WR	1	David Terrell	Jr
RB	32	Anthony Thomas	Sr
WR	4	Marquise Walker	Jr
OL	54	Maurice Williams	Sr
OT	52	Chris Ziemann	Sr

Defense

Pos.	#	Name	Class
LB	17	Larry Foote	Jr
CB	3	Todd Howard	Jr
LB	28	Anthony Jordan	Sr
LB	58	Roy Manning	Fr
DL	53	Shantee Orr	So
FS	15	DeWayne Patmon	Sr
LB	50	Joseph Sgroi	Jr
DB	22	Jon Shaw	So
CB	13	Brian Smalls	So
LB	31	John Spytek	So
LB	32	Kolby Wells	Fr
DB	6	Jonathan West	Sr
CB	5	James Whitley	Sr
CB	12	Bradon Williams	So
FS	14	Dan Williams	Sr
LB	49	Michael Williams	Fr
DL	94	Eric Wilson	Sr
DL	68	John Wood	Jr

Special teams

Pos.	#	Name	Class
K	25	Hayden Epstein	Jr

Head coach

- Lloyd Carr

Coordinators/assistant coaches

Legend

- (C) Team captain
- (S) Suspended
- (I) Ineligible
- Injured
- Redshirt

Roster

=== Offense ===
- Kurt Anderson, offensive lineman, senior, Glenbrook, Illinois
- Dave Armstrong, fullback, junior, Doylestown, Pennsylvania
- B. J. Askew, fullback, sophomore, Cincinnati – started 6 games at fullback
- David Baas, guard, freshman, Sarasota, Florida
- Jeff Backus, offensive tackle, fifth-year senior, Norcross, Georgia – started all 12 games at left offensive tackle
- Ryan Beard, running back, sophomore, Houston, Texas
- Calvin Bell, wide receiver, freshman, Simi Valley, California
- Ronald Bellamy, wide receiver, sophomore, New Orleans, Louisiana – started 3 games at flanker, 2 games at fullback, 1 game at split end
- David Brandt, center, fifth-year senior, Jenison, Michigan – started all 12 games at center
- Andrew Christopfel, offensive lineman, freshman, Cincinnati, Ohio
- Walter Cross, running back, junior, Fort Washington, Maryland
- Joe Denay, offensive lineman, junior, Bay City, Michigan
- Deitan Dubuc, tight end, junior, Fabreville, Quebec
- Tyler Ecker, tight end, freshman, El Dorado Hills, California
- Justin Fargas, running back, junior, Encino, California
- Jermaine Gonzalez, quarterback, freshman, Pontiac, Michigan
- Jonathan Goodwin, offensive line, senior, Columbia, South Carolina – started 9 games at right offensive guard
- Drew Henson, quarterback, junior, Brighton, Michigan – started 8 games at quarterback
- Steve Hutchinson, offensive line, fifth-year senior, Coral Springs, Florida – started all 12 games at left offensive guard
- Tommy Jones, wide receiver, fifth-year senior, Lansing, Michigan
- Bennie Joppru, tight end, junior, Wayzata, Minnesota – started 3 games at tight end, 1 game at split end, 1 game at flanker and 1 game at fullback
- Ben Mast, offensive line, senior, Massillon, Ohio – started 3 games at right offensive guard
- Todd Mossa, offensive line, junior, Darien, Connecticut
- John Navarre, quarterback, sophomore, Cudahy, Wisconsin – started 4 games at quarterback
- Tony Pape, offensive tackle, sophomore, Clarendon Hills, Illinois
- Chris Perry, running back, freshman, Advance, North Carolina
- Aaron Richards, wide receiver, senior, Reading, Michigan
- Eric Rosel, tight end, senior, Liberal, Kansas – started 1 game at fullback
- Bill Seymour, tight end, senior, Granger, Indiana – started 8 games at tight end, 1 game at fullback
- Rudy Smith, wide receiver, senior, Knoxville, Tennessee
- Demetrius Solomon, offensive lineman, sophomore, Flint, Michigan
- David Terrell, wide receiver, junior, Richmond, Virginia – started 10 games at split end
- Anthony Thomas, running back, senior, Winnfield, Louisiana – started all 12 games at tailback
- Shawn Thompson, tight end, senior, Saginaw, Michigan – started 1 game at tight end
- Marquise Walker, wide receiver, junior, Syracuse, New York – started 7 games at flanker
- Eric Warner, offensive lineman, fifth-year senior, Brighton, Michigan
- Maurice Williams, offensive tackle, senior, Detroit, Michigan – started all 12 games at right offensive tackle

=== Defense ===
- Norman Boebert, defensive line, sophomore, Peoria, Arizona
- Grant Bowman, defensive line, sophomore, Blacklick, Ohio – started 5 games at nose tackle
- Eric Brackins, inside linebacker, senior, Pigeon Forge, Tennessee – started 8 games at inside linebacker
- Philip Brackins, linebacker, sophomore, Pigeon Forge, Tennessee
- Emmanuel Casseus, linebacker, freshman, Montreal
- Evan Coleman, RLB, junior, Houston, Texas – started 4 games at r linebacker
- Julius Curry, strong safety, junior, Detroit, Michigan – started 11 games at strong safety
- P. J. Cwayna, inside linebacker, senior, Grand Rapids, Michigan
- Carl Diggs, linebacker, sophomore, Warren, Ohio – started 2 games at inside linebacker
- Charles Drake, defensive back, sophomore, Los Angeles – started 2 games at free safety, 1 game at strong safety, 1 game at inside linebacker
- Larry Foote, inside linebacker, junior, Detroit, Michigan – started all 12 games at inside linebacker
- Robert Fraumann, linebacker, senior, Deerfield, Illinois
- Jake Frysinger, defensive end, senior, Grosse Ile, Michigan – started 1 game at defensive end
- Norm Heuer, defensive line, sophomore, Peoria, Arizona – started 1 game at defensive end, 1 game at nose tackle
- Victor Hobson, outside linebacker, junior, Mt. Laurel, New Jersey – started 10 games at outside linebacker
- Todd Howard, cornerback, junior, Bolingbrook, Illinois – started 11 games at weak-side cornerback
- Clayton Jones, free safety, true freshman, Belle Glade, Florida – 4 interceptions in 8 games
- Anthony Jordan, linebacker, senior, Jersey City, New Jersey – started 1 game at inside linebacker
- Cato June, free safety, junior, Washington, D.C.
- Alain Kashama, defensive line, freshman, Montreal – started 2 games at r linebacker
- Zach Kaufman, linebacker, freshman, Claremont, California
- Brodie Killian, outside linebacker, senior, Dearborn, Michigan
- Shawn Lazarus, defensive line, junior, Canal Fulton, Ohio – started 5 games at defensive tackle
- Jeremy LeSueur, cornerback, sophomore, Holly Springs, Mississippi – started 1 game at strong-side cornerback, 1 game at weak-side cornerback
- Michael Manning, cornerback, senior, Worcester, Massachusetts
- Jeremy Miller, LS, senior, Swanton, Ohio
- Dwight Mosley, linebacker, junior, Fort Wayne, Indiana
- Shantee Orr, RLB, sophomore, Detroit, Michigan – started 2 games at r linebacker, 1 game at nose tackle
- DeWayne Patmon, strong safety, senior, San Diego, California – started 10 games at strong safety
- Dave Pearson, defensive line, sophomore, Brighton, Michigan
- Dave Petruziello, defensive end, junior, Mentor, Ohio – started 3 games at defensive tackle
- Gary Rose, defensive line, senior, Quinnesec, Michigan
- Dan Rumishek, defensive line, junior, Addison, Illinois – started 10 games at defensive end
- Andy Sechler, outside linebacker, fifth-year senior, Union City, Michigan
- Joseph Sgroi, linebacker, junior, Plymouth, Michigan
- Jon Shaw, defensive back, sophomore, Coral Springs, Florida
- John Spytek, linebacker, sophomore, Pewaukee, Wisconsin
- Larry Stevens, linebacker, freshman, Tacoma, Washington – started 4 games at r linebacker
- James Whitley, cornerback, senior, Norfolk, Virginia – started 9 games at strong-side cornerback
- Brandon Williams, cornerback, sophomore, Omaha, Nebraska – started 2 games at strong-side cornerback, 1 game at outside linebacker
- Dan Williams, free safety, fifth-year senior, Temperance, Michigan
- Eric Wilson, defensive line, fifth-year senior, Monroe, Michigan – started 5 games at nose tackle, 4 games at defensive tackle
- Clyde Young, defensive line, senior, Springfield, Ohio

=== Kickers ===
- Jeff Del Verne, place-kicker, fifth-year senior, Sylvania, Ohio
- Hayden Epstein, place-kicker, punter, junior, Cardiff, California
- Adam Finley, punter, place-kicker, freshman, Greenwood, Indiana
- Cory Sargent, punter, fifth-year senior, South Lyon, Michigan

=== Awards and honors ===
The individuals in the sections below earned recognition for meritorious performances at the national, conference and team levels.

==== National ====
- All-Americans: Steve Hutchinson, David Terrell
- Jim Parker Trophy (top collegiate offensive lineman): Steve Hutchinson

==== Conference ====
- All-Conference: Steve Hutchinson, Anthony Thomas, David Terrell, Jeff Backus, Larry Foote
- Big Ten Offensive Lineman of the Year: Steve Hutchinson

==== Team ====
- Co-captains: Steve Hutchinson, Anthony Thomas, James Whitley, Eric Wilson
- Most Valuable Player: Anthony Thomas
- Meyer Morton Award: Jeff Backus
- John Maulbetsch Award: Ronald Bellamy
- Frederick Matthei Award: David Terrell
- Arthur Robinson Scholarship Award: Andy Sechler
- Dick Katcher Award: Dan Rumishek
- Hugh Rader Jr. Award: Jeff Backus, Maurice Williams, Steve Hutchinson
- Robert P. Ufer Award: David Brandt, DeWayne Patmon
- Roger Zatkoff Award: Victor Hobson

== Coaching staff ==
- Head coach: Lloyd Carr
- Assistant coaches: Teryl Austin, Erik Campbell, Jim Herrmann, Brady Hoke, Fred Jackson, Terry Malone, Andy Moeller, Bobby Morrison, Stan Parrish
- Staff: Scott Draper, Mark Ouimet, Kelly Cox
- Trainer: Paul Schmidt
- Managers: Sean Merrill (senior manager), Craig Hisey, Gregory Deutch, Jason Henderson, Chad Seigle, Lisa Kuzma, Victor H. Soto, Chris Anderson, Brian Resutek, Adam Jahnke, Rick Polanco, Craig Podolski, Taylor Morgan, Chris LeMaster, Joe Harper, Maggie Malone
