= Julius Curry =

American football player (born 1979)

No. 26
- Positions: Strong safety, Punt returner

Personal information
- Born: May 17, 1979 (age 47); Detroit, Michigan, U.S.
- Listed height: 6 ft 0 in (1.83 m)
- Listed weight: 195 lb (88 kg)

Career information
- College: Michigan
- NFL draft: 2003: undrafted

Career history
- Chicago Bears (2003)*; Detroit Lions (2003); Green Bay Packers (2004–2005)*
- * Offseason or practice squad member only

Career college statistics
- Punt return yards: 522
- Tackles: 100
- Interception return yards: 116
- Stats at Pro Football Reference

Julius Justin Curry (born May 17, 1979) is an American former professional football player who was a defensive back for the Detroit Lions of the National Football League (NFL). He played college football as a strong safety and punt returner for the Michigan Wolverines from 1999 to 2002. He played in the NFL for the Lions, Chicago Bears, and Green Bay Packers.

== University of Michigan ==
Born in Detroit, Michigan, Curry played college football at the University of Michigan from 1999 to 2002. He was a strong safety and punt returner for the Wolverines. In his college football career, he gained 522 yards on 48 punt returns for an average of 10.9 yards per return. He also accumulated 100 tackles, four interceptions, three fumble recoveries and seven pass break-ups.

In the 2000 game against Ohio State, Curry intercepted a pass and returned it 50 yards for a touchdown to help Michigan beat the Buckeyes, 38–26.

In the 2001 Florida Citrus Bowl, Curry had a key interception to help Michigan to a 31–28 victory over Auburn. With the score tied 14–14 and Auburn driving deep in Michigan territory, Curry intercepted a Ken Leard pass at the Michigan 15-yard line and returned it 39 yards to the Auburn 46-yard line. Anthony Thomas scored a touchdown six plays later to give Michigan a 21–14 lead at halftime.

As a junior, Curry had 97 return yards on four punts and a kickoff in an early season game against Washington. He missed the final seven games of the 2001 season with nerve damage to his right shoulder.

As a senior, Curry had the best game of his career in a 10–7 win over Utah. In the Utah game, Curry intercepted two passes and returned 8 punts for a career-best 105 yards. Curry's final game for Michigan was a 38–30 win over Florida in the 2003 Outback Bowl; Curry had eight tackles and a pass break-up in the game.

== Professional football ==
After being released by the Chicago Bears during the 2003 preseason, Curry joined the Detroit Lions. He appeared in three games and was credited with two tackles for the Lions. Curry would spend the 2004 and 2005 seasons on the Green Bay Packers' practice squad and offseason roster.

== NASCAR ==
In 2006, Curry formed Curry Racing, Inc., to compete in the NASCAR Craftsman Truck Series; Curry Racing was the first Truck Series team to feature sole African-American ownership. However, the team would not run a race.
