= Patmon =

Patmon is a surname. Notable people with the surname include:

- Bill Patmon (1946–2026), American politician
- DeWayne Patmon (born 1979), American football player
- Dezmon Patmon (born 1998), American football player, nephew of DeWayne
- Tyler Patmon (born 1991), American football player
