= Steve Hutchinson (American football) =

American football player (born 1977)

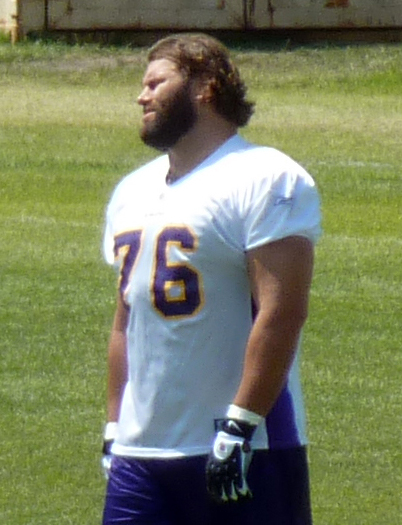
- Hutchinson with the Minnesota Vikings in 2009

No. 76, 73
- Position: Guard

Personal information
- Born: November 1, 1977 (age 49); Fort Lauderdale, Florida, U.S.
- Listed height: 6 ft 5 in (1.96 m)
- Listed weight: 313 lb (142 kg)

Career information
- High school: Coral Springs (Coral Springs, Florida)
- College: Michigan (1996–2000)
- NFL draft: 2001: 1st round, 17th overall pick

Career history
- Seattle Seahawks (2001–2005); Minnesota Vikings (2006–2011); Tennessee Titans (2012)

Awards and highlights
- 5× First-team All-Pro (2003, 2005, 2007–2009); 2× Second-team All-Pro (2004, 2006); 7× Pro Bowl (2003–2009); NFL 2000s All-Decade Team; PFWA All-Rookie Team (2001); 50 Greatest Vikings; Seattle Seahawks 35th Anniversary team; Seattle Seahawks Top 50 players; National champion (1997); Jim Parker Trophy (2000); Unanimous All-American (2000); First-team All-American (1999); Big Ten Offensive Lineman of the Year (2000); 4× First-team All-Big Ten (1997–2000)

Career NFL statistics
- Games played: 169
- Games started: 169
- Fumble recoveries: 6
- Stats at Pro Football Reference
- Pro Football Hall of Fame
- College Football Hall of Fame

Steven J. Hutchinson (born November 1, 1977) is an American former professional football player who was a guard for 12 seasons in the National Football League (NFL). He played college football for the Michigan Wolverines, and was named a unanimous All-American. The Seattle Seahawks selected him in the first round of the 2001 NFL draft, and he also played for the Minnesota Vikings and the Tennessee Titans. A seven-time Pro Bowl selection, he was inducted into the Pro Football Hall of Fame in 2020. Later that year he would be employed by the Seahawks as a consultant.

== Early life ==
Hutchinson was born in Fort Lauderdale, Florida. He attended Coral Springs High School in Coral Springs, Florida, and played high school football for the Coral Springs Colts. He graduated in 1996.

In 2007, he was named to FHSAA's All-Century Team that listed the Top 33 football players in the state of Florida's 100-year history of high school football.

== College career ==
While attending the University of Michigan, Hutchinson played for coach Lloyd Carr's Michigan Wolverines football team from 1996 to 2000. During his redshirt year in 1996, he moved from defensive tackle to offensive guard, and earned a starting position on the 1997 Michigan team that won the Associated Press national championship.

Hutchinson excelled as a four-year starter, and did not allow a sack during his final two seasons as a Wolverine. He was a two-year team captain, four-year All-Big Ten selection, Big Ten Offensive Lineman of the Year, and a two-time All-American—including unanimous first-team All-American honors as a senior in 2000. He also won the Jim Parker Award from the Touchdown Club of Columbus, and was an Outland Trophy finalist.

== Professional career ==
Pre-draft measurables
| Height | Weight | Arm length | Hand span | 40-yard dash | 10-yard split | 20-yard split | 20-yard shuttle | Three-cone drill | Vertical jump | Broad jump | Bench press |
|---|---|---|---|---|---|---|---|---|---|---|---|
| 6 ft 5 1/8 in (1.96 m) | 315 lb (143 kg) | 32 1/2 in (0.83 m) | 10 1/4 in (0.26 m) | 5.13 s | 1.74 s | 2.90 s | 4.74 s | 7.82 s | 33.5 in (0.85 m) | 8 ft 10 in (2.69 m) | 31 reps |
All values from NFL Combine

=== Seattle Seahawks ===
Drafted in the first round of the 2001 NFL draft by the Seattle Seahawks, Hutchinson spent his first five seasons with Seattle. In March 2006, Hutchinson, a free agent, was designated as Seattle's transition player.

While with the Seahawks, Hutchinson made it to 3 Pro Bowls and earned 3 All-Pro honors. He was also a key lineman who blocked for Shaun Alexander in his 2005 MVP season on the way to the Seahawks appearance in Super Bowl XL, where they lost to the Pittsburgh Steelers 21–10. This would be his final game as a member of the Seattle Seahawks.

=== Minnesota Vikings ===
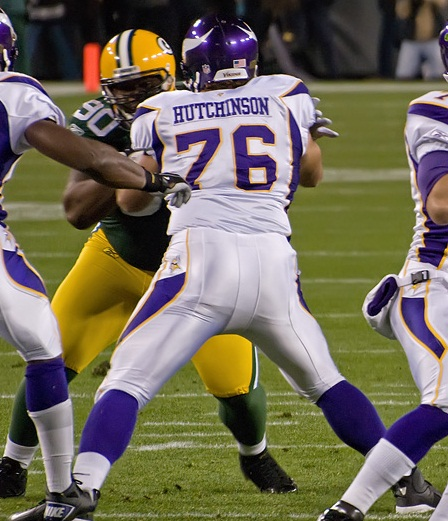
Hutchinson blocking B. J. Raji on November 14, 2011.

Following the opening of free agency, Hutchinson signed a controversial offer sheet from the Vikings, $49 million over seven years, which was believed to be the richest contract ever offered a guard at the time. The offer sheet, though, contained a poison pill provision that would have guaranteed his entire salary if he was not the highest-paid lineman on the team.

At the time, NFL rules required that if a team signed a player with the transition tag to an offer sheet, the original team had to either match the offer sheet exactly or relinquish their rights to that player. While the tag was not triggered during his time with the Vikings—he was released by the Vikings in March 2012—the Seahawks had recently given tackle Walter Jones a contract richer than the one offered to Hutchinson. Thus, the team would have triggered the "poison pill" clause immediately and would have been forced, by NFL rules, to immediately guarantee Hutchinson's entire salary. Since doing so would have destroyed their salary cap, they could not match the offer. Moreover, since they only used their transition tag, rather than naming Hutchinson a franchise player, they received no compensation from Minnesota for their loss. Seattle retaliated, though, by signing Minnesota wide receiver Nate Burleson to an offer sheet containing a similar ploy. Because of this controversy, the NFL banned the use of "poison pills". Hutchinson played 59 straight games while with the Vikings, not missing a start.

On December 21, 2010, Hutchinson was put on injured reserve by the Vikings. Hutchinson also ended the 2011 NFL season on injured reserve. During the first 11-years of his NFL career, Hutchinson had started in all 157 games that he had played in. However, the Minnesota Vikings announced that they had released Hutchinson on March 10, 2012. On March 14, 2012, Hutchinson met with the Seattle Seahawks to work out a possible deal with his former team.

=== Tennessee Titans ===
On March 15, 2012, Hutchinson signed a three-year deal with the Tennessee Titans.

=== Retirement ===
On March 11, 2013, Hutchinson announced his retirement. On February 1, 2020, he was elected into the Pro Football Hall of Fame.

== Awards and honors ==
NFL

- 5× First-team All-Pro (2003, 2005, 2007–2009)
- 2× Second-team All-Pro (2004, 2006)
- 7× Pro Bowl (2003–2009)
- NFL 2000s All-Decade Team
- PFWA All-Rookie Team (2001)
- 50 Greatest Vikings
- Seattle Seahawks 35th Anniversary team
- Seattle Seahawks Top 50 players
- Pro Football Hall of Fame (2020)

College

- National champion (1997)
- Jim Parker Trophy (2000)
- Unanimous All-American (2000)
- First-team All-American (1999)
- Big Ten Offensive Lineman of the Year (2000)
- 4× First-team All-Big Ten (1997–2000)
- Rose Bowl champion (1997)
- Orange Bowl champion (1999)
- 2× Florida Citrus Bowl champion (1998, 2000)

== Personal life ==
Hutchinson married his high school sweetheart Landyn. The couple have a daughter, Lily, and a son, Luke. Hutchinson keeps a vacation home in Key Largo, Florida. He is an avid hunter and fisherman. Hutchinson and his family now reside in Nashville, Tennessee. His family became close with Vikings legend John Randle's family in Seattle and remain good friends.
