= DeWayne Patmon =

American football player (born 1979)

No. 28
- Position: Defensive back

Personal information
- Born: April 25, 1979 (age 47); San Diego, California, U.S.

Career information
- High school: Patrick Henry (San Diego)
- College: Michigan
- NFL draft: 2001: undrafted

Career history
- New York Giants (2001–2002)

Awards and highlights
- National champion (1997)

Career NFL statistics
- Games played: 22
- Stats at Pro Football Reference

DeWayne Nelson Patmon (born April 25, 1979) is an American former professional football player who was a defensive back for the New York Giants of the National Football League (NFL). He played college football for the Michigan Wolverines from 1997 to 2000, winning a national championship and three Big Ten Conference championships. Patmon played for the Giants from 2001 to 2002. He has also had small parts in a pair of Hollywood film productions.

== Early life ==
Patmon attended Patrick Henry High School in San Diego, California. In high school, he was a 6-foot-1, 185-pound free safety for Patrick Henry's football team and was selected as a first-team All-County player by the San Diego Union-Tribune. As a senior in high school, he received numerous scholarship officers and narrowed his choices to Notre Dame, Texas and Michigan. In the end, he said his final decision was easy: "I've always been a Michigan fan. I really didn't like South Bend and, although I figured I'd start right away at Texas, I decided I'd rather start three years at a school like Michigan." He later added, "As a kid, I wore all the Michigan stuff."

== University of Michigan ==
Patmon enrolled at the University of Michigan in 1997. He played four years with the Wolverines, from 1997 to 2000, and recorded 186 tackles, including 137 solo tackles. He is tied for fourth all-time-time at the Michigan with 11 career pass interceptions.

As a freshman, he played in seven games, and started one game at outside linebacker, for the undefeated national champion 1997 Michigan Wolverines football team's record-setting defense. He was credited by the Associated Press for having played a "key role" along with William Peterson and James Whitley in Michigan's 21–16 win over Washington State in the 1998 Rose Bowl.

When Michigan's 1998 co-captain Marcus Ray was suspended by the NCAA for associating with a sports agent, Patmon started 10 games at strong safety for the 1998 team. After a 1998 victory over Michigan State, head coach Lloyd Carr singled out Patmon for praise: "In particular, DeWayne Patmon really stepped up and played the finest game of his collegiate career. Patmon's interception on the one-yard line was a big play late in that ballgame as were some of his hits on receivers over the middle."

Patmon continued to play at free safety for Michigan, starting eight games for the 1999 team and ten games for the 2000 team. The 1998 and 2000 teams were both Big Ten Conference co-champions.

Patmon's final game for Michigan was the 2001 Florida Citrus Bowl in which Michigan defeated Auburn, 31–28. In the Citrus Bowl, Patmon and sophomore safety Julius Curry each "made key interceptions to halt Auburn drives into Michigan territory."

== New York Giants ==
Patmon went undrafted in the 2001 NFL draft and signed the following week with the New York Giants of the National Football League as an undrafted free agent. During the 2001 pre-season, Patmon tried out with the Giants seeking a roster spot as the "gunner" on the punt coverage team. At the time, Patmon described the role of the "gunner" as follows: "The thing about it is, you've got to forget that it's one-on-two and just pick out one guy and beat him. It's a 10-second fight, one vs. two, and you're using your speed and strength to fight them off. You just try to get them off-balance, outrun them, and see if you can make a play on the ball." He earned a spot on the Giants as a safety.

After playing his first game for the Giants against the Denver Broncos, Patmon flew with the team to Newark on September 11, 2001, arriving at 6:00 a.m., before the attack on the World Trade Center. Interviewed by the San Diego Union-Tribune, Patmon said, "You can still see all the smoke in the sky from here ... Time is standing still right now. You don't think about the NFL or losing a game to the Broncos at a time like this ... A lot of people are suffering right now. It puts everything else in perspective."

Patmon played for the Giants in 2001 and 2002, but was waived in March 2003.

== Motion pictures ==
Following his football career, Patmon appeared as a football player in both the 2004 film Friday Night Lights and the 2005 film Two for the Money.
