= 1999 Florida Citrus Bowl =

American college football game

1999 CompUSA Florida Citrus Bowl
Arkansas Razorbacks	Michigan Wolverines
(9–2)	(9–3)
SEC	Big Ten
31	45
Head coach: Houston Nutt	Head coach: Lloyd Carr
AP / Coaches / BCS; 11 / 11 / 13	AP / Coaches; 15 / 15
	1	2	3	4	Total
Arkansas	0	10	14	7	31
Michigan	3	21	0	21	45
- Date: January 1, 1999
- Season: 1998
- Stadium: Florida Citrus Bowl
- Location: Orlando, Florida
- MVP: Anthony Thomas (Michigan RB)
- Referee: John Smith (Big East)
- Attendance: 67,584

United States TV coverage
- Network: ABC
- Announcers: Terry Gannon, Tim Brant, Dean Blevins

The 1999 Florida Citrus Bowl featured the Arkansas Razorbacks of the SEC against the Michigan Wolverines of the Big Ten. Both teams were surprised to be playing in the game. The defending National Champion Wolverines, with their two early season losses and the Razorbacks playing under first year coach Houston Nutt caused very different expectations.

== Game summary ==
Trailing 31-24 with just 5:49 left in the game, the Wolverines rallied by scoring 21 points in four minutes to win their 15th bowl game all-time. Running back Anthony Thomas led the Wolverines with three rushing touchdowns and 139 yards. Thomas was named Citrus Bowl Most Valuable Player and linebacker Sam Sword was named Michigan Defensive MVP by the media after recording 11 tackles.

The Wolverines scored first with 6:29 left in the first quarter as Jay Feely kicked a 43-yard field goal. However, Arkansas responded on a 35-yard touchdown pass from Clint Stoerner to Michael Williams in the second quarter to take a 7-3 lead. Michigan then scored with a two-yard touchdown run from Thomas, and a 46-yard interception return for a touchdown by linebacker Ian Gold. After Arkansas’ Todd Latourette completed a 42-yard field goal cut the lead to 17-10,

Michigan drove 69 yards with a five-yard touchdown run by Thomas taking a 24-10 lead into halftime. However, the Razorbacks would score three consecutive second half touchdowns to take a 31-24 lead.

Thomas tied the game on a one-yard run. Tom Brady found Diallo Johnson in the endzone from 21 yards out for the eventual game winning score with 2:25 remaining. Michigan Cornerback James Whitley sealed the victory with 1:47 remaining by intercepting a Stoerner pass, returning it 26 yards for a touchdown

== Aftermath ==
Michigan became the first Big Ten team to win the Citrus Bowl since 1993.
