= Poison pill =

Poison pill may refer to:

- Suicide pill, a physical pill for suicide by poison
- Poison pill amendment or wrecking amendment, an addition to a legislative bill that renders it ineffective
- Shareholder rights plan, also called a poison pill: in corporate law, a subclass of anti-takeover provisions that dilutes the attacking purchaser's power
- Poison pill (NBA), a type of player contract provision for some free agents in the National Basketball Association
- Poison pill (NFL), a type of player contract provision for some free agents in the National Football League from 1996 to 2010
