= John Dittrich =

American football player (1933–1995)

John Francis Dittrich
No. 62, 68, 60
- Position: Guard

Personal information
- Born: May 7, 1933; Sheboygan, Wisconsin, U.S.
- Died: July 5, 1995 (aged 62); Orlando, Florida, U.S.
- Listed height: 6 ft 1 in (1.85 m)
- Listed weight: 236 lb (107 kg)

Career information
- High school: Cudahy (WI)
- College: Wisconsin
- NFL draft: 1956: 6th round, 70th overall pick

Career history
- Chicago Cardinals (1956); Green Bay Packers (1959); Oakland Raiders (1960); Buffalo Bills (1961)

Career NFL/AFL statistics
- Games played: 47
- Games started: 19
- Fumble recoveries: 2
- Stats at Pro Football Reference

John Francis Dittrich (May 7, 1933 – July 5, 1995) was a player in the National Football League (NFL) and American Football League (AFL) for the Chicago Cardinals, Green Bay Packers, Oakland Raiders, and the Buffalo Bills as a guard. He played at the collegiate level at the University of Wisconsin–Madison.

== Biography ==
Dittrich was born John Francis Dittrich on May 7, 1933 in Sheboygan, Wisconsin. His family later moved to Cudahy, a suburb of Milwaukee, where he attended Cudahy High School. He then attended the University of Wisconsin (now University of Wisconsin-Madison).

Dittrich was drafted in 1956 in round 6, pick 9 (70th overall) by the Chicago Cardinals. He played 12 games that season. In 1959, he played 12 games for the Green Bay Packers. In 1960, he played in 11 games for the Oakland Raiders, and in 1961 he played in 12 games at Buffalo.

Dittrich died in Orlando, Florida in 1995.
