= 2002 Michigan Wolverines football team =

American college football season

2002 Michigan Wolverines football

Outback Bowl champion

Outback Bowl, W 38–30 vs. Florida
- Conference: Big Ten Conference

Ranking
- Coaches: No. 9
- AP: No. 9
- Record: 10–3 (6–2 Big Ten)
- Head coach: Lloyd Carr (8th season)
- Offensive coordinator: Terry Malone (1st season)
- Offensive scheme: Multiple
- Defensive coordinator: Jim Herrmann (6th season)
- Base defense: Multiple
- MVP: B. J. Askew
- Captains: Victor Hobson; Bennie Joppru
- Home stadium: Michigan Stadium

2002 Big Ten Conference football standings
| | Conf. | | | Overall |
| Team | W | | L | W | | L |
|---|---|---|---|---|---|---|
| No. 1 Ohio State $#+ | 8 | – | 0 | 14 | – | 0 |
| No. 8 Iowa %+ | 8 | – | 0 | 11 | – | 2 |
| No. 9 Michigan | 6 | – | 2 | 10 | – | 3 |
| No. 16 Penn State | 5 | – | 3 | 9 | – | 4 |
| Purdue | 4 | – | 4 | 7 | – | 6 |
| Illinois | 4 | – | 4 | 5 | – | 7 |
| Minnesota | 3 | – | 5 | 8 | – | 5 |
| Wisconsin | 2 | – | 6 | 8 | – | 6 |
| Michigan State | 2 | – | 6 | 4 | – | 8 |
| Northwestern | 1 | – | 7 | 3 | – | 9 |
| Indiana | 1 | – | 7 | 3 | – | 9 |
# – BCS National Champion; $ – BCS representative as conference champion; % – BCS at-large representative; + – Conference co-champions; Rankings from AP Poll

The 2002 Michigan Wolverines football team represented the University of Michigan as a member of the Big Ten Conference during the 2002 NCAA Division I-A football season. Led by eighth-year head coach Lloyd Carr, the Wolverines compiled an overall record of 10–3 record with a mark of 6–2 in conference play, placing third in the Big Ten. Michigan was invited to the Outback Bowl, where Wolverines beat Florida. The team played home games at Michigan Stadium in Ann Arbor, Michigan.

== Schedule ==
| Date | Time | Opponent | Rank | Site | TV | Result | Attendance |
|---|---|---|---|---|---|---|---|
| August 31 | 12:00 p.m. | No. 11 Washington* | No. 13 | Michigan Stadium; Ann Arbor, MI (College GameDay) | ABC | W 31–29 | 111,491 |
| September 7 | 12:10 p.m. | Western Michigan* | No. 7 | Michigan Stadium; Ann Arbor, MI | ESPN | W 35–12 | 107,856 |
| September 14 | 1:30 p.m. | at No. 20 Notre Dame* | No. 7 | Notre Dame Stadium; Notre Dame, IN (rivalry) | NBC | L 23–25 | 80,795 |
| September 21 | 12:10 p.m. | Utah* | No. 14 | Michigan Stadium; Ann Arbor, MI | ESPN | W 10–7 | 109,734 |
| September 28 | 3:30 p.m. | at Illinois | No. 14 | Memorial Stadium; Champaign, IL (rivalry) | ABC | W 45–28 | 69,249 |
| October 12 | 3:30 p.m. | No. 15 Penn State | No. 13 | Michigan Stadium; Ann Arbor, MI (rivalry) | ABC | W 27–24 ^{OT} | 111,502 |
| October 19 | 12:05 p.m. | at Purdue | No. 11 | Ross–Ade Stadium; West Lafayette, IN | ESPN | W 23–21 | 62,414 |
| October 26 | 12:05 p.m. | No. 13 Iowa^{†} | No. 8 | Michigan Stadium; Ann Arbor, MI | ESPN | L 9–34 | 111,496 |
| November 2 | 12:05 p.m. | Michigan State | No. 15 | Michigan Stadium; Ann Arbor, MI (rivalry) | ESPN2 | W 49–3 | 111,542 |
| November 9 | 7:45 p.m. | at Minnesota | No. 13 | Hubert H. Humphrey Metrodome; Minneapolis, MN (Little Brown Jug) | ESPN | W 41–24 | 53,773 |
| November 16 | 12:05 p.m. | Wisconsin | No. 12 | Michigan Stadium; Ann Arbor, MI | ESPN2 | W 21–14 | 110,412 |
| November 23 | 12:15 p.m. | at No. 2 Ohio State | No. 12 | Ohio Stadium; Columbus, OH (The Game, College GameDay) | ABC | L 9–14 | 105,539 |
| January 1, 2003 | 11:00 a.m. | vs. No. 23 Florida* | No. 13 | Raymond James Stadium; Tampa, FL (Outback Bowl) | ESPN | W 38–30 | 65,101 |
*Non-conference game; ^{†}Homecoming; Rankings from AP Poll released prior to the game; All times are in Eastern time

== Game summaries ==
=== Washington ===
| Team | 1 | 2 | 3 | 4 | Total |
|---|---|---|---|---|---|
| Washington | 0 | 13 | 10 | 6 | 29 |
| • Michigan | 7 | 7 | 7 | 10 | 31 |

- Date: August 31
- Location: Michigan Stadium, Ann Arbor, MI
- Game start: 12:00 p.m. EST
- TV announcers (ABC): Brad Nessler (Play-by-play), Bob Griese (Color) & Lynn Swann (Sideline)

Scoring summary
| 1 | | MICH | Chris Perry 57 yard run (Philip Brabbs kick) | Michigan 7–0 |
| 2 | | MICH | Braylon Edwards 45 yard pass from John Navarre (Philip Brabbs kick) | Michigan 14–0 |
| 2 | | WASH | Kevin Ware 3 yard pass from Cody Pickett (kick failed) | Michigan 14–6 |
| 2 | | WASH | Rich Alexis 7 yard run (John Anderson kick) | Michigan 14–13 |
| 3 | | WASH | Charles Frederick 52 yard pass from Cody Pickett (John Anderson kick) | Washington 20–14 |
| 3 | | MICH | Chris Perry 2 yard run (Troy Nienberg kick) | Michigan 21–20 |
| 3 | | WASH | John Anderson 30 yard field goal | Washington 23–21 |
| 4 | | MICH | Chris Perry 3 yard run (Troy Nienberg kick) | Michigan 28–23 |
| 4 | | WASH | Rich Alexis 1 yard run (pass failed) | Washington 29–28 |
| 4 | :00 | MICH | Philip Brabbs 44 yard field goal | Michigan 31–29 |

=== Iowa ===
#13 Hawkeyes (7-1) at #8 Wolverines (6-1)

| Team | 1 | 2 | 3 | 4 | Total |
|---|---|---|---|---|---|
| • Iowa | 10 | 0 | 14 | 10 | 34 |
| Michigan | 0 | 6 | 3 | 0 | 9 |

- Date: October 26, 2002
- Location: Michigan Stadium, Ann Arbor, Michigan
- Game start: 12:10 PM EDT
- Game attendance: 111,496
- TV announcers (ESPN): Mark Jones (Play-by-play), Bob Davie (Color commentator) & Holly Rowe (Sideline reporter)
- Source: Box Score Archived 2016-11-13 at the Wayback Machine

Scoring summary
| 1 | 10:37 | Iowa | C.J. Jones 39-yard pass from Brad Banks (Nate Kaeding kick) | Iowa 7-0 |
| 1 | 3:12 | Iowa | Nate Kaeding 51-yard field goal | Iowa 10-0 |
| 2 | 1:13 | Mich | Chris Perry 1-yard run (PAT failed) | Iowa 10-6 |
| 3 | 12:31 | Mich | A Finley 40-yard field goal | Iowa 10-9 |
| 3 | 8:57 | Iowa | C.J. Jones 3-yard pass from Brad Banks (Nate Kaeding kick) | Iowa 17-9 |
| 3 | 2:58 | Iowa | Jermelle Lewis 5-yard run (Nate Kaeding kick) | Iowa 24-9 |
| 4 | 14:47 | Iowa | Jermelle Lewis 23-yard pass from Brad Banks (Nate Kaeding kick) | Iowa 31-9 |
| 4 | 2:49 | Iowa | Nate Kaeding 27-yard field goal | Iowa 34-9 |

=== Wisconsin ===
Wisconsin at #12/#11 Michigan

| Team | 1 | 2 | 3 | 4 | Total |
|---|---|---|---|---|---|
| Wisconsin | 7 | 7 | 0 | 0 | 14 |
| • Michigan | 14 | 0 | 7 | 0 | 21 |

- Date: November 16
- Location: Michigan Stadium, Ann Arbor, MI
- Game start: 12:00 p.m. EST
- TV announcers (ESPN2): Pam Ward (Play-by-play), David Norrie (Color) & Jimmy Dykes (Sideline)
- Source: USA Today

Scoring summary
| 1 | MICH | Askew 27 yard run (Finley kick) | MICH 7-0 |
| 1 | MICH | Perry 11 yard run (Finley kick) | MICH 14-0 |
| 1 | WIS | Leonhard 39 yard punt return (Allen kick) | MICH 14-7 |
| 2 | WIS | A. Davis 2 yard run (Allen kick) | Tied 14-14 |
| 3 | MICH | Edwards 8 yard pass from Navarre (Finley kick) | MICH 21-14 |

- MICH: Chris Perry 175 Rush Yds (career-high)

=== Ohio State ===
#12 Michigan Wolverines (9–2) at #2 Ohio State Buckeyes (12–0)

| Quarter | 1 | 2 | 3 | 4 | Total |
|---|---|---|---|---|---|
| Michigan | 3 | 6 | 0 | 0 | 9 |
| Ohio St | 7 | 0 | 0 | 7 | 14 |

at Ohio Stadium, Columbus, Ohio

- Date: November 23, 2002
- Game time: 12:00 p.m. EST
- Game weather: Cloudy, 38 °F (3 °C)
- Game attendance: 105,539
- Referee: Jim Lapetina
- TV announcers (ABC): Brent Musburger, Gary Danielson, and Jack Arute
- Box Score

Game information

First quarter

- MICH – Adam Finley 36-yard field goal, 8:35. Michigan 3–0. Drive: 12 plays, 41 yards, 4:30.
- OSU – Maurice Clarett 2-yard run (Mike Nugent kick), 2:56. Ohio St 7–3. Drive: 10 plays, 76 yards, 5:30.

Second quarter

- MICH – Adam Finley 35-yard field goal, 10:56. Ohio St 7–6. Drive: 16 plays, 62 yards, 6:55.
- MICH – Adam Finley 22-yard field goal, 0:16. Michigan 9–7. Drive: 19 plays, 88 yards, 8:24.

Fourth quarter

- OSU – Maurice Hall 3-yard run (Mike Nugent kick), 4:55. Ohio St 14–9. Drive: 8 plays, 57 yards, 3:35.

Top passers

- MICH – John Navarre – 23/46, 247 yards, INT
- OSU – Craig Krenzel – 10/14, 124 yards

Top rushers

- MICH – Chris Perry – 28 rushes, 76 yards
- OSU – Maurice Clarett – 20 rushes, 119 yards, TD

Top receivers

- MICH – Braylon Edwards – 10 receptions, 107 yards
- OSU – Michael Jenkins – 4 receptions, 51 yards

== Roster ==
2002 Michigan Wolverines football team roster
Players
Coaches
Offense

| Pos. | # | Name | Class |
|---|---|---|---|
| FB | 37 | B. J. Askew | Sr |
| WR | 8 | Jason Avant | Fr |
| G | 75 | David Baas | Jr |
| WR | 27 | Calvin Bell | Jr |
| OL | 63 | Derek Bell | So |
| WR | 19 | Ronald Bellamy | Sr |
| WR | 80 | Braylon Edwards | So |
| TE | 83 | Bennie Joppru | Sr |
| WR | 88 | Tim Massaquoi | So |
| QB | 16 | John Navarre | Jr |
| RB | 23 | Chris Perry | Jr |

Defense

| Pos. | # | Name | Class |
|---|---|---|---|
| DL | 90 | Norman Heuer | Sr |
| LB | 6 | Victor Hobson | Sr |
| FS | 2 | Cato June | Sr |
| LB | 58 | Roy Manning | Jr |
| DL | 53 | Shantee Orr | Sr |
| DE | 85 | Dave Spytek | So |
| LB | 31 | John Spytek | Sr |

Special teams

| Pos. | # | Name | Class |

Head coach

- Lloyd Carr

Coordinators/assistant coaches

Legend

- (C) Team captain
- (S) Suspended
- (I) Ineligible
- Injured
- Redshirt

Roster

== Statistical achievements ==
Michigan led the Big Ten Conference in quarterback sacks for all games (3.2 sacks per game), while Iowa led for conference games.

John Navarre set numerous single-season school records that he would break the following season: attempts (448), surpassing his own record of 385 the prior season; completions (248), surpassing Tom Brady's 1998 and 1999 totals of 214; yards (2905), Jim Harbaugh's 1986 record of 2729. He also broke the career pass attempts record (910), surpassing Elvis Grbac's 835 in 1992, which he would extend the following year and which Chad Henne would eventually break in 2007. On September 14, Navarre joined Grbac as the only Wolverines with two career 4-touchdown passing games. On September 28, he tied Grbac with three such career outings and became the only Wolverine with two in the same season. Navarre broke Tom Brady's single-season yards per game record of 215.5 set in 1999 with a 223.5 average. He set the current single-season interception percentage record (1.56, minimum 100 attempts), surpassing Wally Gabler's 1965 record of 1.60. He also broke Harbaugh's 1986 single-season 200-yard game total of 8 with 9 and surpassed Brady's career total of 15 by posting his 18th in his junior year.

== Awards and honors ==
- Co-captains: Victor Hobson, Bennie Joppru
- All-Americans: Bennie Joppru, Marlin Jackson
- All-Conference: David Baas, Victor Hobson, Marlin Jackson, Tony Pape
- Most Valuable Player: B.J. Askew
- Meyer Morton Award: John Navarre
- John Maulbetsch Award: Jason Avant
- Frederick Matthei Award: David Baas
- Arthur Robinsion Scholarship Award: Joe Sgroi
- Hugh Rader Jr. Award: Tony Pape
- Robert P. Ufer Award: Charles Drake, Bennie Joppru
- Roger Zatkoff Award: Victor Hobson

== Coaching staff ==
- Head coach: Lloyd Carr
- Assistant coaches: Teryl Austin, Erik Campbell, Jim Herrmann, Brady Hoke, Fred Jackson, Scot Loeffler, Terry Malone, Andy Moeller, Bill Sheridan
- Trainer: Paul Schmidt
- Manager: Craig Hisey (senior manager), Chris Anderson, Tom Burpee, Jeff Clancy, Brandon Greer, Joseph Harper, Michael Henderson, Brad Hoffman, Jeff Levine, Atif Lodhi, Katie McNall, Brad Rosenwasser, Davon Wilson
