= Lamar Gordon =

American football player (born 1980)

No. 34, 30, 25, 41
- Position: Running back

Personal information
- Born: January 7, 1980 (age 46); Milwaukee, Wisconsin, U.S.
- Listed height: 6 ft 1 in (1.85 m)
- Listed weight: 223 lb (101 kg)

Career information
- High school: Cudahy (Cudahy, Wisconsin)
- College: North Dakota State (1998–2001)
- NFL draft: 2002: 3rd round, 84th overall pick

Career history
- St. Louis Rams (2002–2003); Miami Dolphins (2004); Philadelphia Eagles (2005); Detroit Lions (2006)

Career NFL statistics
- Rushing yards: 774
- Rushing average: 3.4
- Receptions: 62
- Receiving yards: 490
- Total touchdowns: 5
- Stats at Pro Football Reference

Lamar DeShawn Gordon (born January 7, 1980) is an American former professional football player who was a running back in the National Football League (NFL). He played college football for the North Dakota State Bison. He attended Cudahy High School in Cudahy, Wisconsin. He was a high school teammate of John Navarre, former Michigan quarterback.

== Professional career ==
Pre-draft measurables
Height	Weight	40-yard dash	10-yard split	20-yard split	Vertical jump	Broad jump	Bench press
6 ft 0 5/8 in (1.84 m)	215 lb (98 kg)	4.50 s	1.03 s	2.01 s	44 in (1.12 m)	9 ft 11 in (3.02 m)	26 reps
Broad jump from Tennessee Pro Day, all others from NFL Combine.

=== St. Louis Rams ===
Gordon was selected by the Rams on the third round of the 2002 NFL draft. During his two season in St. Louis, Gordon rushed for 526 yards and two touchdowns while serving as the backup for 2011 Pro Football Hall of Fame inductee Marshall Faulk. Gordon also made 38 catches, including two receiving touchdowns during his rookie season in 2002.

=== Miami Dolphins ===
In 2004 Gordon was traded to the Miami Dolphins for a third round pick in the 2005 NFL draft. In what would be his only season as a Dolphin, Gordon appeared in three games, rushing for 64 yards on 35 carries. He also caught 13 passes for a total of 74 yards. His season was cut short due to a dislocated shoulder.

=== Philadelphia Eagles ===
Gordon spent the 2005 season as a member of the Philadelphia Eagles where he served as the backup running back to Brian Westbrook. He appeared in 14 of the team's 16 games. Gordon carried the ball 54 times for the Eagles in 2005, gaining 154 yards and rushing for one touchdown. He also made eleven catches for a total of 79 yards.

=== Detroit Lions ===
Gordon appeared in one game during the 2006 season with the Detroit Lions. He carried the ball one time, gaining two yards.
