= Frank Kosikowski =

American football player (1926–1991)

- Kosikowski with Fleet City in 1945

No. 38, 33, 53
- Position: Defensive end

Personal information
- Born: July 23, 1926; Cudahy, Wisconsin, U.S.
- Died: November 17, 1991 (aged 65)
- Listed height: 6 ft 1 in (1.85 m)
- Listed weight: 200 lb (91 kg)

Career information
- High school: Cudahy (WI)
- College: Marquette, Notre Dame

Career history
- Cleveland Browns (1948)

Awards and highlights
- AAFC champion (1948); 2× National champion (1946, 1947)

Career statistics
- Games: 12
- Stats at Pro Football Reference

Frank Leon Kosikowski (July 23, 1926 – November 17, 1991) was an American football offensive and defensive end who was on two Notre Dame national championship teams in the 1940s and played professionally for the Cleveland Browns in 1948.

Kosikowski grew up outside of Milwaukee and was a star on his high school football team. He attended Marquette University, but his college football career was derailed by service in the U.S. Navy during World War II. After the war, he transferred to Notre Dame, where he played under coach Frank Leahy and won two national championships. He was drafted by the Buffalo Bills of the All-America Football Conference (AAFC) in 1947, but the Browns acquired him in 1948. He stayed in Cleveland for the 1948 season, when the team won all of its games and the AAFC championship.

== Early life and college ==
Kosikowski was born in Cudahy, Wisconsin and attended Cudahy High School, where he played football as an end. He also boxed for three years and broke the school record in the 220-yard dash. Kosikowski was the captain of the football team and was named to The Milwaukee Journal and The Milwaukee Sentinel all-suburban first-teams in 1943.

After graduating in 1944, Kosikowski went to Marquette University in Milwaukee and continued his playing career as an end on the Golden Eagles football team. He missed playing time due to injury in the 1944 season, when Marquette won just one game. Kosikowski joined the U.S. Navy the following year as World War II wore on, and was stationed at Naval Station Great Lakes, where Paul Brown was coaching a military football team. He was quickly transferred to a Navy base in California, however, and played for a Fleet City team at Camp Shoemaker that won the service championship in 1945.

Kosikowski transferred in 1946 to the University of Notre Dame, which was regrouping under head coach Frank Leahy after losing many of its best players to the war effort. Kosikowski, who was a second-team end, caused a stir that November when he collided with and injured Notre Dame's star quarterback, Johnny Lujack, in practice before a crucial matchup against Army. Lujack played in the game nonetheless, and Notre Dame finished the season with an 8–0–1 win-loss-tie record. The team was chosen by the Associated Press as the winner of the college football national championship. Kosikowski stayed at Notre Dame for the 1947 season, when the team went undefeated and again won the national championship.

== Professional career ==
Kosikowski had been drafted by the Buffalo Bills of the All-America Football Conference (AAFC) in 1947, and joined the team in 1948. After playing in one game for the Bills, he was acquired by the Cleveland Browns, an AAFC team coached by Paul Brown. Kosikowski was used as a defensive end by the Browns as the team won all of its games in the 1948 season. The Browns beat the Bills to win that year's championship. Kosikowski was moved in 1949 to the Baltimore Colts as part of an effort to bring more competitive balance to the AAFC, but he decided to quit before the season started.
