= Albert M. Bielawski =

American politician (1867–1942)

Member of the Michigan House of Representatives
- In office 1935–1936
- In office 1929–1930

Personal details
- Born: January 16, 1867 Poland
- Died: June 23, 1942 (aged 75)
- Party: Democratic
- Spouse: Hattie Banaszynska (m. 1894)
- Children: 6
- Occupation: Politician, architect

Albert M. Bielawski (January 16, 1867 – June 23, 1942) was a politician in the state of Michigan.

== Biography ==
Bielawski was born in Poland on January 16, 1867, to Joseph and Teresa Bielawski, an ethnically Polish family. Eventually he would move to the United States, living in Cudahy, Wisconsin and Gary, Indiana, before moving to Hamtramck, Michigan and Detroit, Michigan. On June 12, 1894, he married Hattie Banaszynska.

== Career ==
Bielawski was born in Poland in 1867. He served as a Democratic member of the House of Representatives in the State of Michigan from 1929 to 1930 and from 1935 to 1936, vowing to Keep the New Deal in Michigan. He ran in the Democratic primary for the U.S. House of Representatives in 1932 for Michigan's 1st District. He was an architect by trade, and also worked as a superintendent of construction for several steel mills. He and his wife had six children.
