= John Navarre =

American football player (born 1980)

No. 16
- Position: Quarterback

Personal information
- Born: September 9, 1980 (age 46); Cudahy, Wisconsin, U.S.
- Listed height: 6 ft 6 in (1.98 m)
- Listed weight: 243 lb (110 kg)

Career information
- High school: Cudahy
- College: Michigan (1999–2003)
- NFL draft: 2004: 7th round, 202nd overall pick

Career history
- Arizona Cardinals (2004–2006); Indianapolis Colts (2007)*
- * Offseason or practice squad member only

Awards and highlights
- First-team All-Big Ten (2003)

Career NFL statistics
- Passing attempts: 64
- Passing completions: 32
- Completion percentage: 50.0%
- TD–INT: 2–5
- Passing yards: 342
- Passer rating: 43.9
- Stats at Pro Football Reference

John Robert Navarre (born September 9, 1980) is an American former professional football player who was a quarterback in the National Football League (NFL). He played college football for the Michigan Wolverines, and was selected in the seventh round of the 2004 NFL draft by the Arizona Cardinals. He was also a member of the Indianapolis Colts.

== Early life ==
Navarre was born in Cudahy, Wisconsin, on September 9, 1980. He attended Cudahy High School where he had a record of 33–4 as the starting quarterback for the football team.

== College career ==
Navarre played college football for the Michigan Wolverines from 1999 to 2003. He redshirted in 1999 behind Tom Brady and Drew Henson.

To begin the 2000 season, Henson sustained an injury in practice that required redshirt-freshman Navarre to start under center against Michigan's first opponent, Bowling Green. In his first career start, Navarre threw for four touchdowns—a school record for a first-time starting quarterback and the most ever in a season-opener. The four touchdown passes also tied a school record at the time. Navarre's play in the opener earned him Big Ten Conference Offensive Player of the Week. Navarre continued his role as starting quarterback as Henson continued to be sidelined by injury; getting his second start against Rice. Michigan went on the road against No. 14 UCLA and lost, 23–20. The following week, Michigan began Big Ten play against No. 19 Illinois. While Navarre started his fourth game in a row, Henson replaced him late in the first half. Navarre saw limited action at quarterback the rest of the season; ending the season with 583 passing yards and eight touchdowns in nine games.

Shortly after Michigan's win against Auburn in the 2001 Citrus Bowl, Henson announced he would come back for his senior season and forgo entering the 2001 NFL draft.

Navarre began the 2001 season as Michigan's starting quarterback—a role he kept until his last year of eligibility in 2003. In his first full season as Michigan's starting quarterback, Navarre threw for 2,345 yards and nineteen touchdowns. Michigan ended the regular season 8–3 before going on to lose their Citrus Bowl match-up against Tennessee which snapped the school's four-game bowl win streak. In the loss, Navarre threw for 240 yards and two touchdowns.

In his junior season in 2002, Navarre led Michigan to a 9–3 regular season record before a showcase performance in the Outback Bowl, where he threw for a career-high 319 yards and one touchdown en route to 38–30 win over Florida and a 10–3 record to end the season.

On October 4, 2003, at Kinnick Stadium, Navarre established the school single-game record for most passing yards: 389 vs. Iowa. The record stood until Devin Gardner totaled 503 yards on October 19, 2013, against Indiana. In his senior campaign, Navarre again led Michigan to a 10–3 overall record, and the team's first Rose Bowl appearance since the 1997 season. During the regular season, Navarre amassed 3,331 passing yards and 24 touchdowns, posting wins over Michigan rivals, Notre Dame, 38–0; and Ohio State, 35–21. The Wolverines finished the season against USC, ranked No. 1 in both polls, in the Rose Bowl. In the 28–14 loss, Navarre had played his last game as a quarterback at Michigan; gaining 271 passing yards and one touchdown on 27 completions in 46 attempts.

=== Michigan records ===
Navarre holds the following Michigan football records:

- Most pass attempts in a season: 456 (2003)
- Most pass completions in a season: 270 (2003)
- Most passing yards in a season: 3,331 (2003)
- Most touchdown passes in a game: 4 (tied for second, broken by Jake Ruddock with 6 TDs in 2015), three occasions (2000, vs. Bowling Green; 2002, vs. Western Michigan and vs. Illinois)
- Most total offensive plays in a season: 504 (2003)

Navarre held several Michigan career passing records including those for attempts, completions, and passing yards before Chad Henne surpassed those marks in 2007. He also held the records for most total offensive yards gained in a game (368 vs. Iowa in 2003) and in a season (3,240 in 2003) before being surpassed by Denard Robinson in 2010. In 2003, Navarre led the Wolverines to their largest comeback in school history, overcoming a 21-point deficit as they defeated Minnesota, 38–35.

== Professional career ==
Pre-draft measurables
Height	Weight	Arm length	Hand span	40-yard dash	10-yard split	20-yard split	20-yard shuttle	Three-cone drill	Vertical jump	Broad jump
6 ft 6 in (1.98 m)	246 lb (112 kg)	31 3/8 in (0.80 m)	9 in (0.23 m)	5.18 s	1.75 s	2.97 s	4.46 s	7.73 s	26.5 in (0.67 m)	8 ft 4 in (2.54 m)
All values from NFL Combine

=== Arizona Cardinals ===
Navarre was selected in the seventh round of the 2004 NFL draft to the Arizona Cardinals of the National Football League (NFL). He made his NFL debut in his rookie season against the Detroit Lions in week twelve. He finished the 12–26 loss going eighteen of forty for 168 yards, one touchdown, and four interceptions in a game where he also fractured his finger. He would play in one more game for the Cardinals in week fourteen of the 2005 season against the Houston Texans. He went fourteen of 24 for 174 alongside one touchdown and one interception. Following the 2006 season he would not resign with the team.

=== Indianapolis Colts ===
On March 12, 2007, Navarre signed with the Indianapolis Colts. He was released prior to the start of the season.

== Career statistics ==
=== NFL ===
Legend
**Bold**	Career best

Year	Team	Games			Passing										Rushing				Sacks		Fumbles	
Year	Team	GP	GS	Record	Cmp	Att	Pct	Yds	Avg	TD	Int	Rtg	TD%	Int%	Att	Yds	Avg	TD	Sck	Yds	Fum	Lost
2004	ARI	**1**	**1**	**0–1**	**18**	**40**	45.0	168	4.2	**1**	**4**	25.8	2.5	**10.0**	**0**	**0**	**0.0**	**0**	1	8	0	0
2005	ARI	**1**	0	—	14	24	**58.3**	**174**	**7.3**	**1**	1	**77.4**	**4.2**	4.2	**0**	**0**	**0.0**	**0**	**4**	**27**	**1**	**1**
2006	ARI	DNP																				
2007	IND	DNP																				
Career		2	1	0−1	32	64	50.0	342	5.3	2	5	43.9	3.1	7.8	0	0	0.0	0	5	35	1	1

=== College ===
Year	Team	Games		Passing								Rushing			
Year	Team	GP	Record	Comp	Att	Pct	Yards	Avg	TD	Int	Rate	Att	Yards	Avg	TD
1999	Michigan	Did not play													
2000	Michigan	9	3–1	40	77	51.9	583	**7.6**	8	**1**	**147.2**	11	-34	-3.1	0
2001	Michigan	11	8–3	186	346	53.8	2,195	6.3	17	12	116.3	45	-100	-2.2	0
2002	Michigan	**13**	**10–3**	248	448	55.4	2,905	6.5	21	7	122.2	40	**-16**	**-0.4**	**2**
2003	Michigan	**13**	**10–3**	**270**	**456**	**59.2**	**3,331**	7.3	**24**	10	133.6	**48**	-91	-1.9	0
Career		46	31−10	744	1,327	56.1	9,014	6.8	70	30	126.0	144	-241	-1.7	2

== Personal life ==
Navarre currently resides in Elmhurst, Illinois. He works as the Operations Manager at Alro Steel Corporation's Bolingbrook, Illinois plant.

== See also ==
- Lists of Michigan Wolverines football passing leaders
