= Franchise tag =

NFL roster management strategy

In the National Football League (NFL), the franchise tag is a designation a team may apply to a player scheduled to become an unrestricted free agent. The tag binds the player to the team for one year if certain conditions are met. Each team has one franchise tag (of either the exclusive or non-exclusive forms) and one transition tag per year. In most seasons, the transition tag can only be used if the team does not use a franchise tag; with exceptions as stipulated in the Collective Bargaining Agreement (CBA). For example, Article 10 of the CBA signed in 2011 stipulated that, in the Final League Year, teams were allowed to use both the franchise tag and transition tag for the 2020 NFL season.

The tag option allows NFL franchises to retain a "franchise player" who is valuable to a franchise. The one-year, guaranteed contract that is offered to the player is a known, non-negotiated salary. If a designated player does not sign the offer and is unable or unwilling to negotiate an alternative contract before week 10 of the designated season, the player is unable to sign or negotiate a contract in the NFL for the remainder of the season.

The franchise tag provides general managers and owners a strategic way to manage salary costs and limit exposure to the financial risks associated with a long-term contract. Many designated players have criticized the use of the franchise tag by teams when it restricts their perceived ability to negotiate a more lucrative contract.

== Background ==
The National Football League introduced the franchise tag in 1993. There are two types of franchise tag designation: the exclusive rights franchise tag, and the non-exclusive rights franchise tag:

- An "exclusive" franchise player must be offered a one-year contract for an amount no less than the average of the top five salaries at the player's position as of a date in April of the current year in which the tag will apply, or 120 percent of the player's previous year's salary, whichever is greater. Exclusive franchise players cannot negotiate with other teams. The player's team has all the negotiating rights to the exclusive player.
- A "non-exclusive" franchise player must be offered a one-year contract for an amount no less than the average of the top five cap hits at the player's position for the previous five years applied to the current salary cap, or 120 percent of the player's previous year's salary, whichever is greater. A non-exclusive franchise player may negotiate with other NFL teams, but if the player signs an offer from another team, the original team has a right to match the terms of that offer, or if it does not match the offer and thus loses the player, is entitled to receive two first-round draft picks as compensation.
- Under the capped years, a team can designate one additional player with a transition tag. A transition player must be offered a minimum of the average of the top 10 salaries of the prior season at the player's position or 120 percent of the player's prior year's salary, whichever is greater. A transition player designation gives the club a first-refusal right to match, within seven days, an offer sheet given to the player by another club after his contract expires. If the club matches, it retains the player. If it does not match, it receives no compensation.
- Consecutive franchise tags are allowed, unless the player and club have agreed to a "no franchise tag" clause in his most recent contract and/or the contract is otherwise structured in such a way as to prevent its use. For any player to be tagged in two straight years, the team must pay 120 percent of the player's previous salary or the average of the 5 highest paid players at their position, whatever is greater. If tagged in three straight years, the team must pay the player 144 percent of his previous salary, or an average of the top 5 highest salaries, regardless of position, whichever is higher.
