= Cudahy High School =

High school in Wisconsin, United States

Coordinates: 42.95455°N 87.84893°W

Location
- 4950 S. Lake Drive; Cudahy, Wisconsin 53110; United States

Information
- Type: Public
- NCES District ID: 5503060
- Teaching staff: 44.25 (on an FTE basis)
- Grades: 9–12
- Enrollment: 644 (2024–2025)
- Student to teacher ratio: 15.24
- Colors: Purple and gold
- Nickname: Packers
- Website: www.cudahysd.org

Cudahy High School is a public high school which serves Cudahy, Wisconsin, a suburb of Milwaukee in southeastern Milwaukee County, Wisconsin. It is the only high school in the Cudahy School District.

The school athletic teams are known as the Packers, in honor of the meatpacking industry which was once the city's raison d'être.

== Athletic conference affiliation history ==
- Suburban Conference (1925-1985)
- Suburban Park Conference (1985-1993)
- Woodland Conference (1993–present)

== Notable alumni ==
- John Dittrich, professional American football player
- Lamar Gordon, professional American football player
- Lawrence P. Kelly, state legislator from Cudahy
- John Navarre, professional American football player
