= Lloyd Carr =

American football player and coach (born 1945)

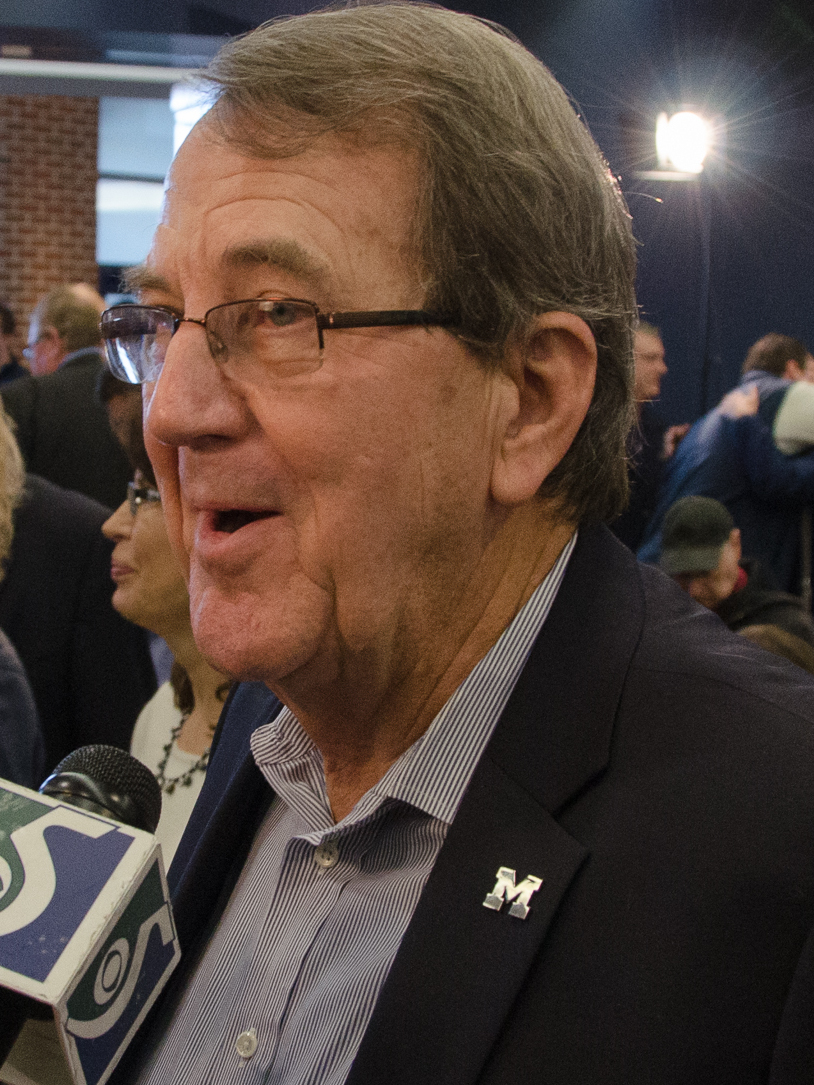
- Carr in 2013

Biographical details
- Born: July 30, 1945 (age 81); Hawkins County, Tennessee, U.S.

Playing career
- 1964–1966: Missouri
- 1967: Northern Michigan
- Position: Quarterback

Coaching career (HC unless noted)
- 1968–1969: Nativity HS (MI) (assistant)
- 1970–1973: Belleville HS (MI) (assistant)
- 1974–1975: John Glenn HS (MI)
- 1976–1977: Eastern Michigan (assistant)
- 1978–1979: Illinois (DB)
- 1980: West Virginia (DB)
- 1980–1986: Michigan (DB)
- 1987–1990: Michigan (DC)
- 1990–1994: Michigan (DC/AHC)
- 1995–2007: Michigan

Head coaching record
- Overall: 122–40 (college); 12–5 (high school)
- Bowls: 6–7

Accomplishments and honors

Championships
- National (1997); 5 Big Ten (1997–1998, 2000, 2003–2004)

Awards
- AFCA Coach of the Year (1997); George Munger Award (1997); Paul "Bear" Bryant Award (1997); Walter Camp Coach of the Year Award (1997); Bobby Dodd Coach of the Year Award (2007)
- College Football Hall of Fame; Inducted in 2011 (profile)

Lloyd Henry Carr Jr. (born July 30, 1945) is an American former football coach and player. He served as the head football coach at the University of Michigan from 1995 through the 2007 season, replacing Gary Moeller. Under Carr, the Michigan Wolverines compiled a record of 122–40 and won or shared five Big Ten Conference titles (1997, 1998, 2000, 2003, and 2004). Carr's undefeated 1997 team was declared the national champion by the Associated Press. His record coaching against top ten-ranked opponents was 20–8. Carr was inducted into the College Football Hall of Fame as a coach in 2011.

== Youth and education ==
Born in Hawkins County, Tennessee, Carr moved with his family to Riverview, Michigan when he was ten years old. Carr's picture is still on display in the Riverview Community High School gym lobby, where he quarterbacked the Pirates to an undefeated season in 1962. A talented athlete, Carr played college football and college baseball for three seasons at the University of Missouri, and one season at Northern Michigan University (NMU) while earning his Master of Arts in education administration. He was a star quarterback at NMU and led the Wildcats to an undefeated season in 1967. Carr had originally played under Dan Devine at Missouri, following fellow Riverview graduates Woody Widenhofer and Bill McCartney. Carr transferred to Northern Michigan when the man who chiefly recruited him to Missouri, Rollie Dotsch, was named head coach.

Carr received an honorary doctorate from the University of Michigan shortly after retiring. He also received an honorary degree from Albion College in 2008.

== Early coaching career ==
Carr's coaching career began as an assistant at Nativity High School (Detroit, Michigan) in 1968–69, and at Belleville High School (1970–73). He became head coach at John Glenn High School in Westland, Michigan in 1974 and earned Regional Class A Coach of the Year honors in 1975 following an 8–1 season.

Carr's collegiate coaching career started with two seasons as an assistant coach at Eastern Michigan University (1976–77) under head coach Ed Chlebek, followed by two seasons as an assistant coach at Illinois (1978–79) under head coach Gary Moeller. He was briefly the defensive backs coach at West Virginia in the summer of 1980 under head coach Don Nehlen, before departing for Michigan in the fall to work under head coach Bo Schembechler. At Michigan, he was reunited with Moeller, who was returning as an assistant coach. Carr was the team's defensive secondary coach for his first seven seasons and then defensive coordinator from 1987 until 1994. When Moeller succeeded Schembechler in 1990, he granted Carr the title of assistant head coach.

== Head coach at Michigan ==
Carr was named Michigan's interim head coach on May 13, 1995, following the resignation of Gary Moeller nine days earlier due to off-the-field trouble. Though athletic director Joe Roberson initially declared that Carr was not a candidate in the search for Moeller's permanent replacement, Roberson reversed his earlier position and formally named Carr Michigan's 17th head coach on November 13, 1995, after Carr posted an 8–2 record through his first ten games. His very first game as head coach, at home against Virginia in late August 1995, was at the time Michigan's largest-ever comeback win, from 17–0 down. Carr has acknowledged that had Michigan lost that game, he might not have been given the permanent coaching job.

In 1997, Carr's team defeated Ohio State, 20–14, making him the third Michigan coach to defeat Ohio State in each of his first three games, following Fielding H. Yost and Fritz Crisler. The Wolverines concluded that season with a win over Washington State in the Rose Bowl, after which Michigan was named national champions by the Associated Press. They were also awarded the MacArthur Trophy by the National Football Foundation and the Grantland Rice Award by the Football Writers Association of America, given annually to the nation's most outstanding football team. For his efforts Carr received the Paul "Bear" Bryant Award and the Walter Camp Coach of the Year Award.

During the 2003 season, Carr joined Yost, Bennie Oosterbaan and Schembechler as the only coaches in school history to serve for more than 100 career games. The Wolverines won consecutive Big Ten Conference championships in 2003 and 2004, earning the school's 18th and 19th appearances in the Rose Bowl. In 2005, Carr recorded his 100th career victory against Iowa. He ranks third in school history in career victories, behind only Schembechler (194) and Yost (165).

At a Sunday team meeting, on November 18, 2007, after the completion of the 2007 regular season, Carr told his team that he was retiring after Michigan's bowl game, and he made his official public announcement at a press conference on Monday, November 19, 2007. On the eve of his final game versus the defending national champion Florida in the Capital One Bowl, Carr was awarded the Bobby Dodd Coach of the Year Award, despite the Wolverines’ season-opening loss to Division 1-AA Appalachian State.

On January 1, 2008, then-unranked Michigan beat ninth-ranked Florida, 41–35, in the Capital One Bowl, allowing Carr to record a win in his final game as Michigan's head coach. The Gators were led by head coach Urban Meyer and Heisman Trophy winner Tim Tebow. In the celebration that followed, Carr was carried off the field by his Michigan players. In the final AP Poll released after the game, Michigan was ranked #18.

== Legacy ==
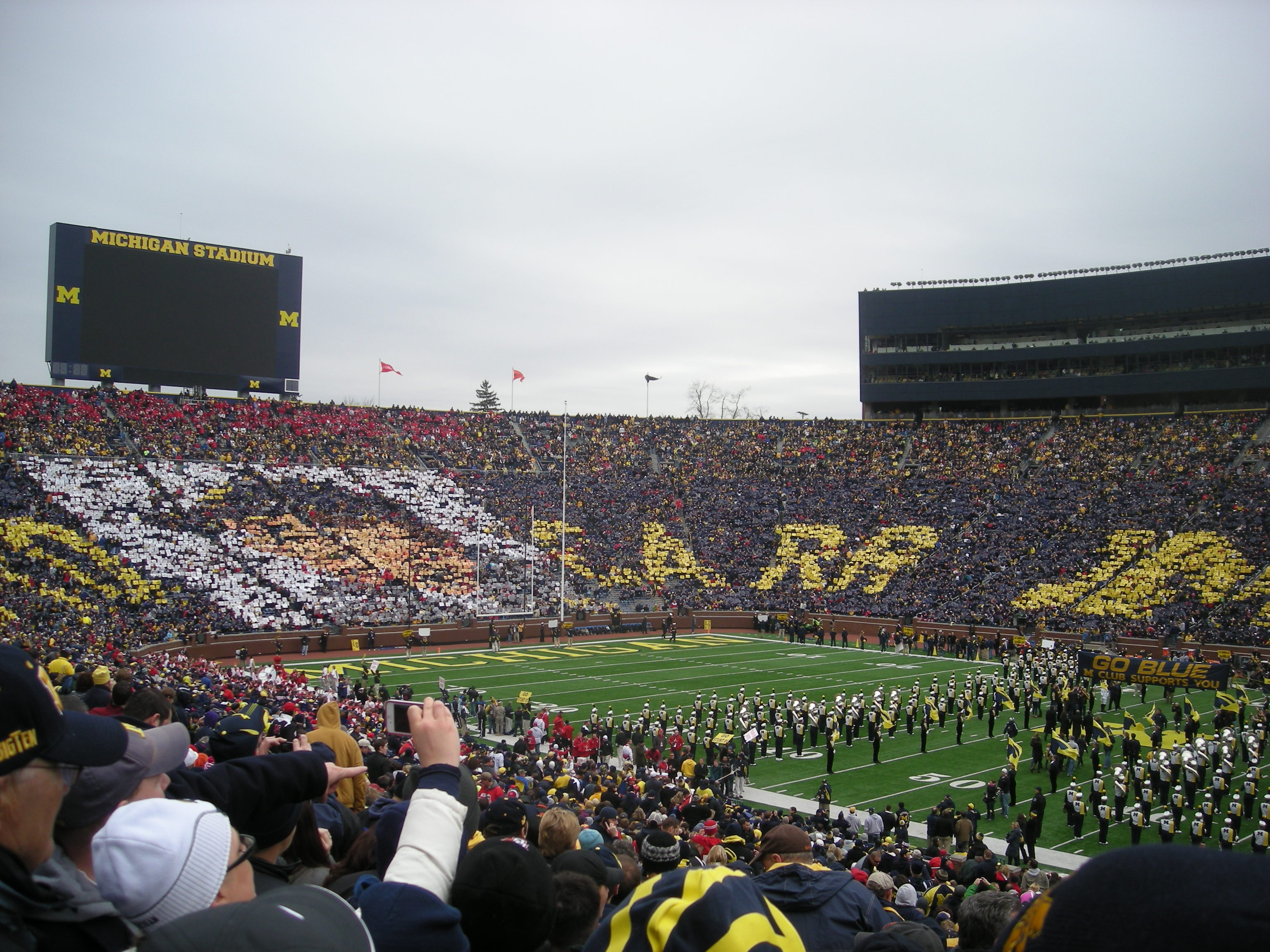
Card display honoring Carr prior to a 2011 Michigan football game against Nebraska.

Carr was among the winningest active football coaches in the NCAA Division I Football Bowl Subdivision (formerly Division I-A). His teams won five Big Ten titles and the 1997 national championship after beating Washington State in the Rose Bowl. In addition, Michigan was ranked in the Associated Press Top 25 for all but nine of its games under Carr (all occurring in 1998, 2005, and 2007). Only once during his tenure did Michigan conclude its season unranked (2005). Carr became the first Wolverine coach to win four straight bowl games, beating Auburn, 31–28, in the 2001 Citrus Bowl, after leading Michigan to victories in the 1998 Rose Bowl, 1999 Citrus Bowl, and the 2000 Orange Bowl. Carr was inducted into the Rose Bowl Hall of Fame on December 30, 2013, at the Pasadena Convention Center.

Carr finished his Michigan head coaching tenure with 122 victories, the third-most in school history. He posted a winning record against two of Michigan's three top rivals, going 5–4 against Notre Dame and 10–3 against Michigan State, while faring 6-7 against Ohio State. Carr also recorded a 9–2 record against Penn State.

While Carr never posted a losing season (either in Big Ten play or overall), the second half of his tenure was less successful than the first half in two respects: his performance against Ohio State and in bowl games. While he won five of his first six games against Ohio State, he lost six of his last seven. Likewise, after winning five of his first eight bowl games, he lost four consecutively before winning his career finale against Florida. In his final season, fifth-ranked Michigan lost its home opener to Football Championship Subdivision member Appalachian State in what is considered one of college football's largest upsets.

Carr was inducted into the Northern Michigan University Sports Hall of Fame in 1996, and the University of Michigan Athletic Hall of Honor in 2015.

== Activities off the field ==
In addition to his work on the football field, Carr is involved with the University and the community. He has been active in support of women’s athletics, endowing a women’s sports scholarship that is presented annually to a female student-athlete at UM.

Carr has served as the chairman of the WJR/Special Olympics Golf Outing. He and his wife, Laurie, were also co-chairs of the 2002 Washtenaw County United Way Campaign. Carr serves on the NCAA Rules Committee and is a member of the American Board of Trustees.

Carr has hosted “Carr's Wash for Kids”, an annual charity car wash benefiting the C.S. Mott Children's Hospital, since 2004.

Carr also hosts the Hall-of-Fame Football Camp in his hometown of Riverview, Michigan. In 2008, the city renamed the former Pennsalt Park "Lloyd Carr Park" in his honor.

He was an assistant athletic director at Michigan through 2010, after he retired as head football coach.

Carr is also cohost, with WXYZ-TV sports director Tom Leyden, of the Detroit ABC affiliate's college football pregame show, Big Ten Ticket, which focuses primarily on the Wolverines, the Michigan State Spartans and other Big Ten football teams.

On January 21, 2016, Carr was named to the College Football Playoff Selection Committee.

== Personal life ==
Carr's first wife, Karen, worked at Pioneer High School in Ann Arbor, Michigan. They had three children including Jason Carr, a Michigan quarterback when Lloyd was the assistant head coach and head coach of the program.

Carr married his second wife, Laurie, in 1994, one year before he became the Michigan head coach. It was the second marriage for both of them. The couple lived in Ann Arbor until 2019, when they moved to South Carolina. During their short time there, Laurie was diagnosed with cancer. They returned to Ann Arbor in 2020, where she received treatment at the University of Michigan Hospital. Laurie Carr died of cancer at the age of 70.

In 2015 Carr's grandson Chad died at the age of five of diffuse intrinsic pontine glioma, a rare and difficult to treat cancer. The ChadTough Defeat DIPG Foundation was created in his honor to raise money for research.

Carr's grandson CJ Carr, a four-star high school quarterback recruit, committed to the University of Notre Dame to play college football. He led the Fighting Irish to a 10-2 record in his first season starting as a redshirt freshman in 2025.

Carr's grandson Tommy Carr committed to the University of Michigan as a four-star quarterback recruit in November 2025.

== Head coaching record ==
=== College ===
Year	Team	Overall	Conference	Standing	Bowl/playoffs	Coaches^{#}	AP^{°}
Michigan Wolverines (Big Ten Conference) (1995–2007)
1995	Michigan	9–4	5–3	T–3rd	L Alamo	19	17
1996	Michigan	8–4	5–3	T–5th	L Outback	20	20
1997	Michigan	12–0	8–0	1st	W Rose	2	1
1998	Michigan	10–3	7–1	T–1st	W Florida Citrus	12	12
1999	Michigan	10–2	6–2	T–2nd	W Orange^{†}	5	5
2000	Michigan	9–3	6–2	T–1st	W Florida Citrus	10	11
2001	Michigan	8–4	6–2	2nd	L Florida Citrus	20	20
2002	Michigan	10–3	6–2	3rd	W Outback	9	9
2003	Michigan	10–3	7–1	1st	L Rose^{†}	7	6
2004	Michigan	9–3	7–1	T–1st	L Rose^{†}	12	14
2005	Michigan	7–5	5–3	T–3rd	L Alamo		
2006	Michigan	11–2	7–1	T–2nd	L Rose^{†}	9	8
2007	Michigan	9–4	6–2	T–2nd	W Capital One	19	18
Michigan:		122–40	81–23				
Total:		122–40					
National championship Conference title Conference division title or championship game berth
^{†}Indicates BCS bowl.; ^{#}Rankings from final Coaches Poll.; ^{°}Rankings from final AP Poll.

== Player accomplishments ==
In the Carr era, several Michigan players won national and conference awards:

=== National awards ===
- Heisman Trophy: Charles Woodson (1997)
- Walter Camp Award: Charles Woodson (1997)
- Chuck Bednarik Award: Charles Woodson (1997)
- Bronko Nagurski Trophy: Charles Woodson (1997)
- Jim Thorpe Award: Charles Woodson (1997)
- Doak Walker Award: Chris Perry (2003)
- Dave Rimington Trophy: David Baas (2004)
- Fred Biletnikoff Award: Braylon Edwards (2004)
- Lombardi Award: LaMarr Woodley (2006)
- Ted Hendricks Award: LaMarr Woodley (2006)

=== Conference honors ===
- Big Ten MVP: Charles Woodson (1997), Chris Perry (2003), Braylon Edwards (2004)
- Big Ten Offensive Player of the Year: Chris Perry (2003), Braylon Edwards (2004)
- Big Ten Offensive Lineman of the Year: Jon Jansen (1998), Steve Hutchinson (2000), David Baas (2004), Jake Long (2006–07)
- Big Ten Defensive Player of the Year: Charles Woodson (1997), Larry Foote (2001), LaMarr Woodley (2006)
- Big Ten Defensive Lineman of the Year: LaMarr Woodley (2006)
- Big Ten Freshman of the Year: Charles Woodson (1995), Anthony Thomas (1997), Steve Breaston (2003), Mike Hart (2004)
