= Jim Miklaszewski =

American journalist

- Born: July 8, 1949 (age 77); Cudahy, Wisconsin
- Occupation: Correspondent
- Years active: 1970s–2016
- Title: NBC News Chief Pentagon Correspondent
- Spouse: Cheryl Heyse
- Children: 2

James Alan Miklaszewski (/ˌmɪkləˈʃɛfski/; born July 8, 1949), known to his colleagues and contacts as "Mik", is a retired journalist whose career spanned more than forty years, most of it covering the White House and Pentagon for NBC News.

On September 11, 2001, Miklaszewski was NBC's Chief Pentagon Correspondent reporting live from his desk when American Airlines Flight 77 slammed into the building and he was first to report the Pentagon had been attacked. He then led NBC's coverage of US military operations for the war in Afghanistan, and the hunt for Osama bin Laden, the mastermind behind the 9/11 attack on America.

Miklaszewski's broadcast career began in West Texas at radio stations KVOP in Plainview and KLBK in Lubbock. He then spent several years as a News Director/Reporter for several radio stations in Madison and La Crosse, Wisconsin and in Fort Worth, Texas.

In 1980, Miklaszewski signed on as one of the "CNN Originals" where he quickly logged considerable battlefield experience covering the wars in Lebanon, El Salvador and the Falkland Islands. CNN later assigned him to the Reagan White House where he reported on the bombing that killed 241 U.S. and 58 French military personnel in Lebanon, the US military invasion of Grenada, and the President and Mrs. Reagan's trip to China.

NBC hired Miklaszewski first as a Pentagon correspondent in 1985 where he joined US forces during the "Tanker Wars" in the Persian Gulf. Jim was later assigned to cover President George H. W. Bush during the first Gulf War with Iraq, and summits with Mikhail Gorbachev, and Boris Yeltsin. He remained in the White House for President Bill Clinton's first term and reelection. Miklaszewski returned to the Pentagon where he covered the 9/11 attack, the US invasion of Iraq and ultimately the US Navy SEALs operation that killed Osama bin Laden.

During his career Miklaszewski received an Emmy Award for his reporting on the Russian shootdown of Malaysia Airlines Flight 17, an Edward R. Murrow Award for his documentary series After Nam about the Vietnam War, and a Cable Industray award for his coverage of the Salvadoran Civil War.

He retired from NBC on September 28, 2016. He is married to Cheryl Heyse Miklaszewski and has two children, James and Jeffrey, and two daughters-in-law, Cybill and Samantha.
