= 2003 Outback Bowl =

- 17th Outback Bowl
Michigan Wolverines	Florida Gators
(9–3)	(8–4)
Big Ten	SEC
38	30
Head coach: Lloyd Carr	Head coach: Ron Zook
AP / Coaches / BCS; 12 / 11 / 11	AP / Coaches; 22 / 20
	1	2	3	4	Total
Michigan	7	14	14	3	38
Florida	0	16	7	7	30
- Date: January 1, 2003
- Season: 2002
- Stadium: Raymond James Stadium
- Location: Tampa, Florida
- MVP: Chris Perry (Michigan RB)
- Favorite: Michigan by 1.5
- Referee: Nick Define (MAC)
- Attendance: 65,101

United States TV coverage
- Network: ESPN
- Announcers: Dave Barnett, Mike Golic, Bill Curry, Michele Tafoya

The 2003 Outback Bowl was a college football bowl game held on January 1, 2003, at Raymond James Stadium in Tampa, Florida. The Michigan Wolverines, third-place finishers in the Big Ten Conference, defeated the Florida Gators, who finished second the Eastern Division of the Southeastern Conference (SEC), 38–30. Michigan running back Chris Perry was named the game's MVP.

== Game summary ==
Michigan got on the board first after a 4-yard touchdown run by Chris Perry to open up a 7–0 lead. In the second quarter, Florida running back Earnest Graham scored on a 2-yard touchdown run to tie the game at 7-7. Later in the second quarter, Graham scored again on a 1-yard run, but a two-point conversion attempt by Ran Carthon failed. Florida led 13–7. Chris Perry scored again on a 1-yard run to give Michigan a 14–13 lead. Florida kicker Matt Leach connected on a 29-yard field goal to retake the lead for the Gators, 16–14. John Navarre threw an 8-yard touchdown pass to wide receiver Ronald Bellamy to give Michigan a 21-16 halftime lead.

In the third quarter, Florida quarterback Rex Grossman threw a 33-yard touchdown pass to wide receiver Keiwan Ratliff to put Florida up 23–21. Michigan answered with two more touchdown runs by Chris Perry, from 7 and 12 yards out, to lead 35–23. In the fourth quarter, Grossman found wide receiver Aaron Walker for a 3-yard touchdown pass to cut the lead to 35–30. Adam Finley connected on a 33-yard field goal to increase Michigan's lead to 38–30, which held up as the final score.

=== Scoring summary ===
==== First quarter ====
- Michigan - Chris Perry, 4-yard run (Adam Finley kick)

==== Second quarter ====
- Florida - Earnest Graham, 2-yard run (Matt Leach kick)
- Florida - Earnest Graham, 1-yard run (Ran Carthon run failed)
- Michigan - Chris Perry, 1-yard run (Adam Finley kick)
- Florida - Matt Leach, 29-yard field goal
- Michigan - Ronald Bellamy, 8-yard pass from John Navarre (John Hines kick)

==== Third quarter ====
- Florida - Keiwan Ratliff, 33-yard pass from Rex Grossman (Matt Leach kick)
- Michigan - Chris Perry, 7-yard run (Adam Finley kick)
- Michigan - Chris Perry, 12-yard run (Adam Finley kick)

==== Fourth quarter ====
- Florida - Aaron Walker, 3-yard pass from Rex Grossman (Matt Leach kick)
- Michigan - Adam Finley, 33-yard field goal
