= Transition tag =

Tool to retain unrestricted free agents

A transition tag is a designation used by National Football League (NFL) teams to retain unrestricted free agents. It guarantees the original club the right of first refusal to match any offer the player may make with another team. The transition tag can be used once a year by each club unless they elect to use a franchise tag instead. Transition tags can be rescinded; however, teams that rescind a transition tag cannot use it again until the next season.

If a player signs a contract after receiving the transition tag, his original team cannot use the tag again on any player until the contract has expired. The exception is if the player first signs a transition offer sheet, which is a one-year contract equal to the average salary of the top ten players in the league at the player's position, or a twenty percent salary increase, whichever is greater. This contract was not historically guaranteed; however, it became guaranteed starting in 2007 per the collective bargaining agreement agreed to by the NFL owners and the NFLPA on March 8, 2006. If the player signs the offer sheet prior to a long-term contract, the player's team can then use the tag the next year.

If another club offers a contract to a transitioned player, his original club has seven days to decide whether to match that offer or not. If the original club agrees to match, the player is forced to sign with the original club at the terms agreed to in the offer by the other club. If the original club declines to match, the player signs with the other team, and the original team is offered no compensation, as they would be if the player had received the franchise tag.

== History ==
The transition tag was established in 1993, following the advent of free agency in the NFL. Teams were afraid of losing their best players to free agency, which was not a concern previously. The NFL granted each team two transition tags, each of which they could only use once and never again. The system has been since changed to allow each team to use a transition tag each year it is available to them.

== Disadvantages ==
The transition tag is rarely used by NFL franchises. There are two reasons for this. The first is that the one-year transition offer is typically a large amount, which could provide the club with difficulties while attempting to keep the team's aggregate salaries under the salary cap. The other is that players often react badly to receiving the tag, because it limits their ability to negotiate with other teams and therefore hinders their chances of receiving the largest possible contract. Players sometimes counter the tag by holding out or refusing to play for the club, creating distractions and headaches for the club.

== Poison pill ==
The advent of the poison pill came in 1996. The 49ers intended to sign Giants running back Rodney Hampton to an offer sheet with a poison pill that stated Hampton would be "on the field for 70% of the offensive plays over the next 2 seasons." The Giants had drafted Tyrone Wheatley with their first-round pick in 1995 but he was largely ineffective in his first season. Since he played the same position as Hampton, the Giants had planned to ease him into the offense with Hampton on the back end of his career. For the Giants to match the 6-year deal, they would be forced to play Hampton in 70% of the plays, thus making the previous year's draft pick of Wheatley a loss. The 49ers later decided to not include the clause, as they felt the NFL would never approve the terms. Their assumption would be proven incorrect following the 2005 season, with the historic offer sheet Steve Hutchinson signed with the Minnesota Vikings.

The transition tag's usefulness began to be questioned after the contract offered by the Minnesota Vikings to Steve Hutchinson, an offensive guard who had received the transition tag following the 2005 season from the Seattle Seahawks. The contract was for $49 million over seven years, $16 million of which was guaranteed. However, the Vikings added a poison pill: The entire $49 million contract was guaranteed if Hutchinson were not the highest-paid offensive lineman on the team he signed with. Since Hutchinson's salary was less than that of the Seahawks' Walter Jones, an offensive tackle, his contract would have been guaranteed by the Seahawks, while the Vikings, having no offensive linemen averaging more than Hutchinson's proposed salary, would only be obligated to pay the guaranteed $16 million. The Seahawks filed a grievance with the NFL league office, claiming that the poison pill was illegal under the collective bargaining agreement in that the Seahawks would have to pay significantly more than the Vikings despite matching with exactly the same contract. An arbitrator ruled in favor of the Vikings, and the Seahawks were essentially unable to match and received no compensation.

In an act of apparent revenge, the Seattle Seahawks included their own "poison pills" when signing restricted free agent wide receiver Nate Burleson. The total contract was seven years and $49 million—not coincidentally the exact amount of the contract Hutchinson received from the Vikings. The first poison pill stipulated that the entire contract would be guaranteed if Burleson played five or more games in the state of Minnesota during any year of the contract. This of course would be impossible as a member of the Seahawks, but an inevitability as a member of the Vikings, who played their home games in the Hubert H. Humphrey Metrodome in Minnesota. The second provision would guarantee the full contract if Burleson is paid more on average per year than all of his team's running backs combined. At the time of his signing, the averages of the Vikings' tailbacks fell well shy of the $7 million average of the Burleson offer sheet. However, in Seattle, running back Shaun Alexander alone made an average of over $7 million per year.

In 2011, the NFL and NFLPA ratified a new collective bargaining agreement. In this agreement, poison pill clauses were eliminated from offer sheets issued to players under the transition tag. The specific language in the CBA states:

"No Offer Sheet may contain a Principal Term that would create rights or obligations for the Old Club that differ in any way (including but not limited to the amount of compensation that would be paid, the circumstances in which compensation would be guaranteed, or the circumstances in which other contractual rights would or would not vest) from the rights or obligations that such Principal Term would create for the Club extending the Offer Sheet (i.e., no 'poison pills')."

The effect of this additional language has resulted in the transition tag being useful to teams again. In 2014, the Pittsburgh Steelers applied the transition tag to Jason Worilds and the Cleveland Browns applied the transition tag to Alex Mack. Worilds signed his transition tag, while Mack accepted an offer sheet from Jacksonville. Cleveland later matched to the offer sheet, thus keeping Mack as a Brown.

== 2024 transition player costs by position ==
Quarterback	$34,367,000
Linebacker	$19,971,000
Wide receiver	$19,766,000
Defensive end	$19,076,000
Offensive linemen (includes offensive tackle, offensive guard, center)	$19,040,000
Defensive tackle	$18,491,000
Cornerback	$17,215,000
Safety	$13,815,000
Tight end	$10,878,000
Running back (includes all fullbacks and halfbacks)	$9,765,000
Special Teams (kicker/punter)	$5,433,000
