= Lawrence P. Kelly =

American politician

Lawrence Kelly

Mayor of Cudahy, Wisconsin
- In office 1964–1988
- Succeeded by: Raymond Glowacki

Member of the Wisconsin State Assembly from the 24th district
- In office 1963–1964

Personal details
- Born: December 18, 1913 Sparta, Wisconsin
- Died: August 23, 1999 (aged 86) Cudahy, Wisconsin
- Spouse: Bernice (Nee Milewski) (July 21, 1914-September 13, 2005) (aged 91)
- Children: James

Lawrence P. Kelly (December 18, 1912 – August 23, 1999) was an American accountant and business manager from Cudahy, Wisconsin who served one term (1963-1964) as a Democratic member of the Wisconsin State Assembly from Milwaukee County's 24th district.

Born in Sparta, Wisconsin, Kelly moved to Cudahy with his family. He managed movie theaters. He also served as mayor of Cudahy 1964–1988.
