= Cudahy, Wisconsin =

- City
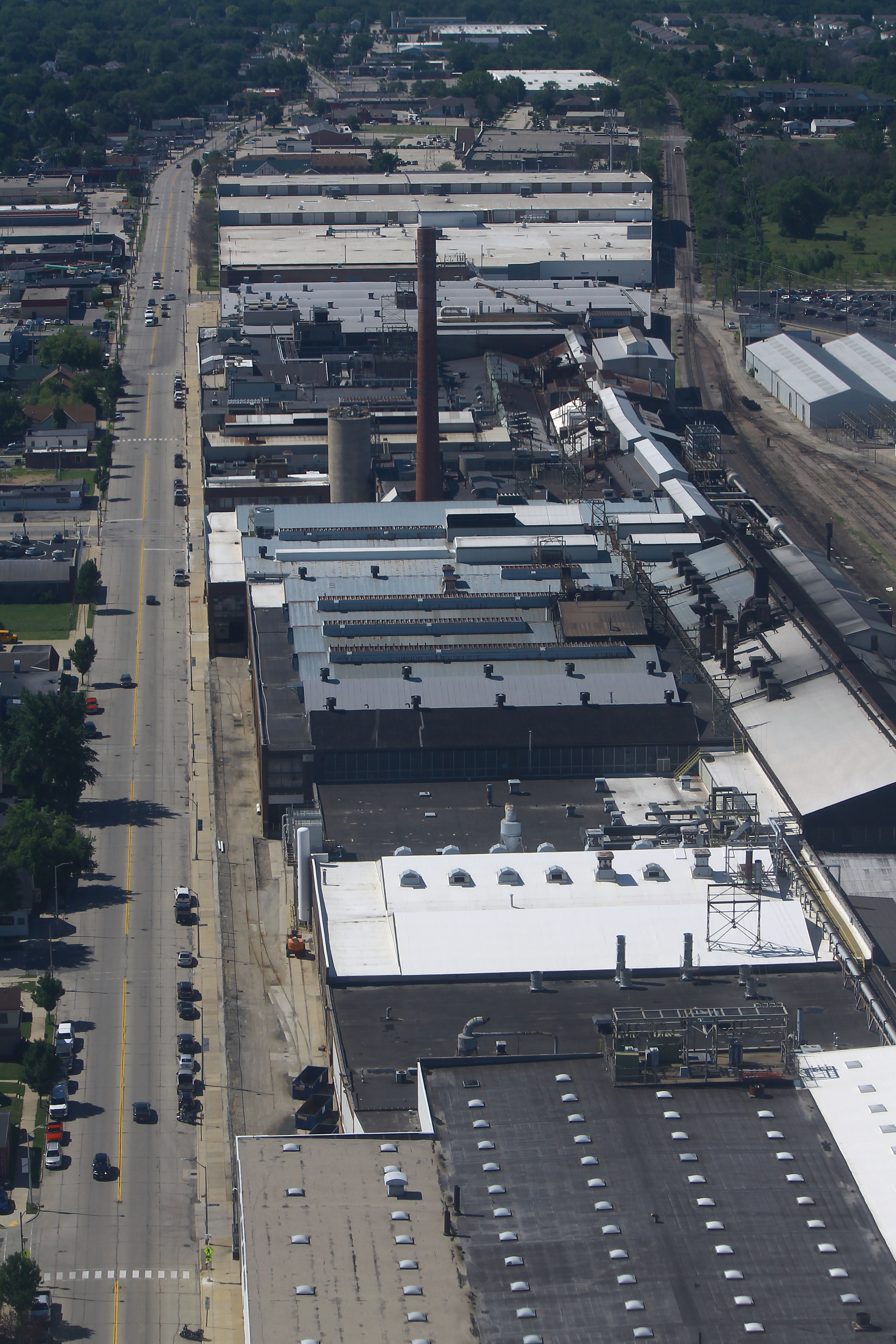
- Aerial image of ATI Forge and Packard Avenue
- Interactive map of Cudahy, Wisconsin
- Location within Wisconsin Location within the United States
- Coordinates: 42°56′54″N 87°51′40″W
- Country: United States
- State: Wisconsin
- County: Milwaukee

Government
  - Mayor: Kenneth Jankowski Jr. (R)

Area
  - Total: 4.77 sq mi (12.36 km^{2})
  - Land: 4.77 sq mi (12.36 km^{2})
  - Water: 0 sq mi (0.00 km^{2})
- Elevation: 720 ft (220 m)

Population (2020)
  - Total: 18,204
  - Estimate (2021): 17,946
  - Density: 3,792.2/sq mi (1,464.18/km^{2})
- Time zone: UTC−6 (Central (CST))
  - Summer (DST): UTC−5 (CDT)
- ZIP Code: 53110, 53111
- Area code: 414
- FIPS code: 55-17975
- GNIS feature ID: 1563607
- Website: www.cudahy-wi.gov

Cudahy (/ˈkʌdəheɪ/, KUD-ə-hay) is a city in Milwaukee County, Wisconsin, United States. The population was 18,204 at the 2020 census. A suburb south of Milwaukee along the shore of Lake Michigan, it is part of the Milwaukee metropolitan area.

== History ==
Originally known as the Buckhorn Settlement, it was renamed in the late 1800s when Patrick Cudahy purchased 700 acres (280 ha) of land in the Town of Lake, two miles (three kilometers) from the Milwaukee city limits, to build his meatpacking plant. The first village president was elected in 1895, and by 1906 Cudahy was incorporated as a city with a population of 2,556.

== Geography ==
Cudahy is located at 42°56′54″N 87°51′40″W (42.948416, −87.861010). According to the United States Census Bureau, the city has a total area of 4.76 square miles (12.3 km^{2}), all land. The city is located next to the Milwaukee Mitchell International Airport.

== Demographics ==
Historical population
Census	Pop.	Note	%±
1900	1,366		—
1910	3,691		170.2%
1920	6,725		82.2%
1930	10,631		58.1%
1940	10,561		−0.7%
1950	12,182		15.3%
1960	17,975		47.6%
1970	22,078		22.8%
1980	19,547		−11.5%
1990	18,659		−4.5%
2000	18,429		−1.2%
2010	18,267		−0.9%
2020	18,204		−0.3%
2021 (est.)	17,946		−1.4%
U.S. Decennial Census

=== 2020 census ===
As of the 2020 census, Cudahy had a population of 18,204. The median age was 41.3 years. 19.8% of residents were under the age of 18 and 18.2% of residents were 65 years of age or older. For every 100 females there were 100.4 males, and for every 100 females age 18 and over there were 97.3 males age 18 and over.

100.0% of residents lived in urban areas, while 0.0% lived in rural areas.

There were 8,202 households in Cudahy, of which 24.8% had children under the age of 18 living in them. Of all households, 37.0% were married-couple households, 24.5% were households with a male householder and no spouse or partner present, and 29.9% were households with a female householder and no spouse or partner present. About 36.7% of all households were made up of individuals and 14.8% had someone living alone who was 65 years of age or older.

There were 8,712 housing units, of which 5.9% were vacant. The homeowner vacancy rate was 1.7% and the rental vacancy rate was 4.5%.

Racial composition as of the 2020 census
Race	Number	Percent
White	14,029	77.1%
Black or African American	831	4.6%
American Indian and Alaska Native	165	0.9%
Asian	288	1.6%
Native Hawaiian and Other Pacific Islander	7	0.0%
Some other race	980	5.4%
Two or more races	1,904	10.5%
Hispanic or Latino (of any race)	2,798	15.4%

=== 2010 census ===
At the 2010 census there were 18,267 people, 8,059 households, and 4,666 families living in the city. The population density was 3,837.6 inhabitants per square mile (1,481.7/km^{2}). There were 8,662 housing units at an average density of 1,819.7 per square mile (702.6/km^{2}). The racial makeup of the city was 88.8% White, 2.7% African American, 0.9% Native American, 1.4% Asian, 3.6% from other races, and 2.7% from two or more races. Hispanic or Latino of any race were 9.7%.

Out of 8,059 households, 27.0% had children under the age of 18 living with them, 40.7% were married couples living together, 11.8% had a female householder with no husband present, 5.4% had a male householder with no wife present, and 42.1% were non-families. Of households, 35.5% were made up of individuals, and 13.1% were one person aged 65 or older. The average household size was 2.26 and the average family size was 2.94.

The median age was 40.3 years. 21.5% of residents were under the age of 18; 7.8% were between the ages of 18 and 24; 26.6% were from 25 to 44; 28.3% were from 45 to 64; and 15.7% were 65 or older. The gender makeup of the city was 49.1% male and 50.9% female.

=== 2000 census ===
At the 2000 census there were 18,429 people, 7,888 households, and 4,890 families living in the city. The population density was 3,880.1 inhabitants per square mile (1,498.1/km^{2}). There were 8,273 housing units at an average density of 1,741.8 per square mile (672.5/km^{2}). The racial makeup of the city was 93.89% White, 0.95% African American, 0.81% Native American, 0.84% Asian, 0.03% Pacific Islander, 1.45% from other races, and 2.03% from two or more races. Hispanic or Latino of any race were 4.73%.

Out of 7,888 households, 28.0% had children under the age of 18 living with them, 46.6% were married couples living together, 11.6% had a female householder with no husband present, and 37.9% were non-families. Of households, 32.5% were one person and 12.8% were one person aged 65 or older. The average household size was 2.32 and the average family size was 2.94.

The age distribution was 23.0% under the age of 18, 8.0% from 18 to 24, 31.3% from 25 to 44, 21.9% from 45 to 64, and 15.8% 65 or older. The median age was 38 years. For every 100 females, there were 95.6 males. For every 100 females age 18 and over, there were 92.9 males.

The median household income was US$40,157, and the median family income was $49,082. Males had a median income of $36,787 versus $25,882 for females. The per capita income for the city was $19,615. About 5.6% of families and 8.2% of the population were below the poverty line, including 11.1% of those under age 18 and 6.3% of those age 65 or over.

== Education ==
The Cudahy School District provides public education for the area. Cudahy High School is the local high school.

St. Paul's Lutheran School is a K4–8 Christian grade school of the Wisconsin Evangelical Lutheran Synod in Cudahy.

== Government ==
Cudahy is represented by Bryan Steil (R) in the United States House of Representatives, and by Ron Johnson (R) and Tammy Baldwin (D) in the United States Senate. Chris Larson (D) represents Cudahy in the Wisconsin State Senate, and Christine Sinicki (D) represents Cudahy in the Wisconsin State Assembly.

== Notable people ==
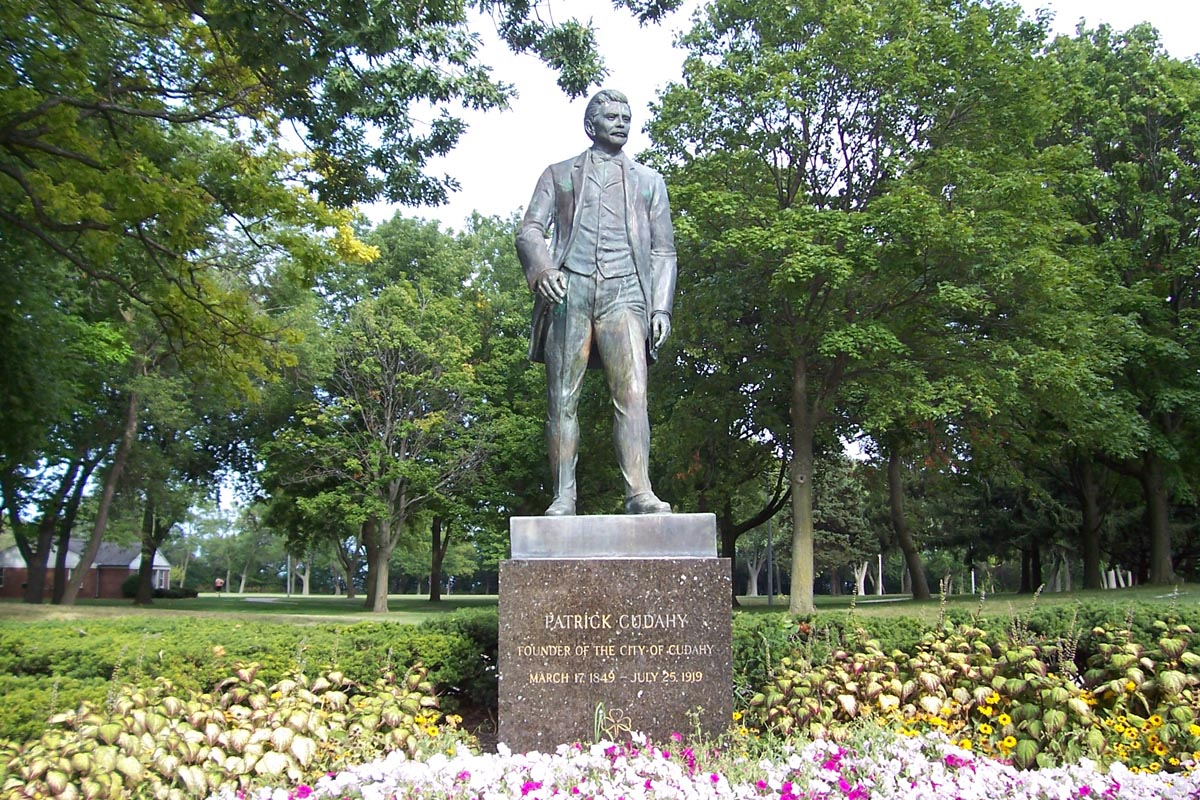
Patrick Cudahy Memorial statue in Sheridan Park

- Albert M. Bielawski, Michigan state representative
- Frank Chermak, Wisconsin legislator
- Patrick Cudahy, founder of Cudahy and Cudahy Packing Company
- Barney Augustus Eaton, Wisconsin legislator
- Lamar Gordon, NFL Running Back
- Lawrence P. Kelly, mayor of Cudahy and legislator
- Frank Kosikowski, professional football player
- Jim Miklaszewski, NBC News correspondent for the Pentagon
- Vaughn Monroe, Big Band era singer, lived in Cudahy for a time as a child
- John Navarre, NFL quarterback
- Sherman R. Sobocinski, Wisconsin legislator
- George C. Windrow, Wisconsin legislator
