= James Whitley (American football) =

American football player (born 1979)

No. 27, 25
- Position: Cornerback

Personal information
- Born: May 13, 1979 (age 47); Decatur, Illinois, U.S.
- Listed height: 5 ft 11 in (1.80 m)
- Listed weight: 190 lb (86 kg)

Career information
- High school: Norview (VA)
- College: Michigan
- NFL draft: 2001: undrafted

Career history
- Montreal Alouettes (2001); St. Louis Rams (2002–2003); Green Bay Packers (2003–2004); Carolina Panthers (2004); Montreal Alouettes (2005); BC Lions (2005); Georgia Force (2007–2008)

Awards and highlights
- Second-team USA Today All-USA (1996)

Career NFL statistics
- Tackles: 52
- Sacks: 3
- Fumble recoveries: 1
- Stats at Pro Football Reference
- Stats at ArenaFan.com

James Lavell Whitley (born May 13, 1979) is an American former professional football player who was a cornerback in the National Football League (NFL). He played college football at Michigan. He also played in the Canadian Football League (CFL) and Arena Football League (AFL).

== Early life and college career ==
Born in Decatur, Illinois, Whitley attended Norview High School in Norfolk, Virginia. At Norview, Whitley started at both quarterback and cornerback; he made the USA Today All-USA second-team as a senior in 1996.

Whitley played college football for the University of Michigan from 1997 to 2000. As a freshman, he played for the undefeated 1997 Michigan Wolverines football team that defeated Washington State in the 1998 Rose Bowl to win a national championship. In December 2000, he was dismissed from the team following an arrest for carrying a concealed weapon. During his four years as a player for Michigan, Whitley had 187 tackles including 13 for loss, six interceptions, five sacks, and 21 punt returns for 172 yards.

== Pro football career ==
After not being selected in the 2001 NFL draft, Whitley signed with the Montreal Alouettes of the Canadian Football League in 2001. He played in 14 games with five starts and made 27 tackles, one fumble recovery, one sack, and four special teams tackles.

On February 26, 2002, Whitley signed as a free agent with the St. Louis Rams. In the 2002 and 2003 seasons, Whitley played in 16 games with one start for the Rams with 32 tackles, four passes defended, and a fumble recovery. During a 2003 off season mini-camp, Whitley injured his right foot and was on injured reserve early in the season. The Rams released Whitley on December 2, 2003. Whitley signed with the Green Bay Packers as a free agent on December 10, 2003. Whitley played in the Packers' final three regular season games and both playoff games primarily on special teams. After playing in six games in 2004, he was waived by the Packers in October.

He signed in November 2004 with the Carolina Panthers. However, he did not appear in any games for the Panthers. In 2005, Whitley returned to the Alouettes, making 22 tackles and one interception in nine games. He later played in three games for the BC Lions of the CFL, making nine tackles. From 2007 to 2008, Whitley played for the Georgia Force of the Arena Football League. He had 44 tackles, eight passes defended, a fumble recovery, and an interception in two seasons.

== Post-football life ==
2022, Whitley has relocated back to Virginia. Working to develop his New brand NineseveN and foundation, GlorYoUs Foundation geared towards helping the community with resources for food, shelter, education & mentorship.
