= 2001 Florida Citrus Bowl =

American college football game

2001 Capital One Florida Citrus Bowl
Michigan Wolverines	Auburn Tigers
(8–3)	(9–3)
Big Ten	SEC
31	28
Head coach: Lloyd Carr	Head coach: Tommy Tuberville
AP / Coaches / BCS; 17 / 15 / 16	AP / Coaches; 20 / 20
	1	2	3	4	Total
Michigan	7	14	10	0	31
Auburn	0	14	7	7	28
- Date: January 1, 2001
- Season: 2000
- Stadium: Florida Citrus Bowl
- Location: Orlando, Florida
- MVP: Anthony Thomas (Michigan RB)
- Referee: Pat Flood (Pac-10)
- Attendance: 66,928

United States TV coverage
- Network: ABC
- Announcers: Sean Grande, David Norrie, Chip Tarkenton

The 2001 Florida Citrus Bowl was a college football bowl game held on January 1, 2001 at the Florida Citrus Bowl in Orlando, Florida. The Michigan Wolverines, co-champions of the Big Ten Conference, defeated the Auburn Tigers, champions of the Southeastern Conference's Western Division, 31-28. Michigan running back Anthony Thomas was named the game's MVP.
