= Ronald Bellamy =

American football player and coach (born 1981)

Michigan Wolverines
- Title: Director of player personnel

Personal information
- Born: December 28, 1981 (age 44); New Orleans, Louisiana, U.S.

Career information
- High school: Archbishop Shaw (Marrero, Louisiana)
- College: Michigan
- NFL draft: 2003: undrafted

Career history

Playing
- Miami Dolphins (2003)*; Scottish Claymores (2004); Miami Dolphins (2004); Baltimore Ravens (2005)*; Detroit Lions (2007–2008)*
- * Offseason or practice squad member only

Coaching
- West Bloomfield High School; Head coach (2010–2020); Michigan; Safeties coach (2021); Wide receivers coach & pass game coordinator (2022–2025); Director of player personnel (2026–present)

Awards and highlights
- CFP national champion (2023)

Career NFL statistics
- Receptions: 1
- Receiving yards: 8
- Stats at Pro Football Reference

Ronald Bellamy (born December 28, 1981) is an American college football coach and former wide receiver. He is the Director of Player Personnel at the University of Michigan; hired in 2026. Bellamy was previously an assistant coach at Michigan from 2021 to 2025. He played college football for the Michigan Wolverines from 1999 to 2002. Bellamy also played in the National Football League (NFL), entering with the Miami Dolphins as an undrafted free agent in 2003.

Bellamy was also a member of the Scottish Claymores, Baltimore Ravens and Detroit Lions. He served as the head football coach at West Bloomfield High School in West Bloomfield, Michigan from 2010 to 2021. On January 23, 2021 Bellamy led the West Bloomfield Lakers to a MHSAA Division 1 State Championship, with a 41-0 win over Davison. After the season he announced he would be resigning his post at West Bloomfield High School to accept a job on the coaching staff for his alma mater, the University of Michigan.

== Early life ==
Bellamy lettered in both football and track at Archbishop Shaw High School in Marrero, Louisiana.

== College career ==
Bellamy attended the University of Michigan from 1999 to 2002, where he played wide receiver and majored in sport management communications. In his career, he had 67 receptions for 888 yards and nine touchdowns, including 46 receptions for 530 yards and five touchdowns as a senior. From 2000 to 2002, Bellamy started 25 out of 36 games played.

== Professional career ==
=== Detroit Lions ===
Bellamy spent 2007 on the practice squad of the Detroit Lions in the National Football League. After the 2008 preseason, he was waived by the Lions during final cuts on August 30, 2008.

== Coaching career ==
Bellamy was appointed varsity football coach at West Bloomfield High School, Michigan in January 2010. In 2021, Bellamy was hired by Jim Harbaugh at the University of Michigan. Bellamy coached safeties in 2021 and wide receivers from 2022 to 2025, helping lead the Wolverines to a national championship in 2023. In 2026, new Michigan head coach Kyle Whittingham hired Bellamy as the Director of Player Personnel, after not retaining him as the wide receivers coach.
