= Anthony Thomas (American football) =

American football player and coach (born 1977)

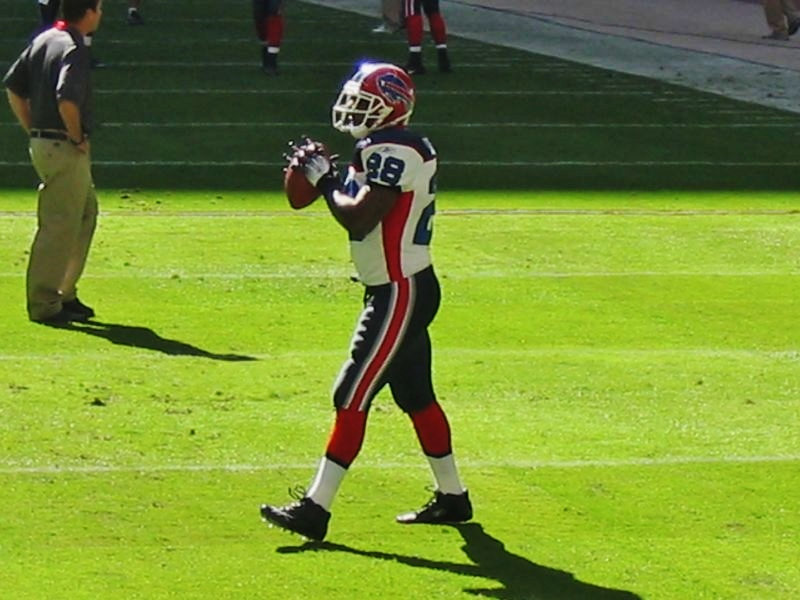
- Thomas with the Buffalo Bills in 2006

No. 35, 32, 28
- Position: Running back

Personal information
- Born: November 7, 1977 (age 48); Winnfield, Louisiana, U.S.
- Listed height: 6 ft 2 in (1.88 m)
- Listed weight: 225 lb (102 kg)

Career information
- High school: Winnfield (LA)
- College: Michigan (1997–2000)
- NFL draft: 2001: 2nd round, 38th overall pick

Career history

Playing
- Chicago Bears (2001–2004); Dallas Cowboys (2005); New Orleans Saints (2005); Buffalo Bills (2006–2007)

Coaching
- West Virginia Wesleyan (2011) Running backs coach; West Virginia Wesleyan (2012) Special teams coordinator & assistant head coach

Awards and highlights
- NFL Offensive Rookie of the Year (2001); PFWA All-Rookie Team (2001); National champion (1997); Third-team All-American (2000); First-team All-Big Ten (2000); Second-team All-Big Ten (1999); Big Ten Freshman of the Year (1997)

Career NFL statistics
- Rushing yards: 3,891
- Rushing average: 3.7
- Rushing Touchdowns: 23
- Receptions: 113
- Receiving yards: 756
- Receiving touchdowns: 1
- Stats at Pro Football Reference

Anthony "A-Train" Thomas (born November 7, 1977) is an American former professional football player who was a running back for seven seasons in the National Football League (NFL). He played college football for the Michigan Wolverines from 1997 to 2000, breaking their career rushing record at the time with a four-year total of 4,472 yards. As a senior he rushed for 1,733 yards with 18 touchdowns, and was selected as a first-team All-Big Ten running back.

Thomas was selected by the Chicago Bears in the second round of the 2001 NFL draft. As a rookie with the Bears in 2001, he rushed for over 1,100 yards and seven touchdowns to earn NFL Offensive Rookie of the Year honors. He played for the Bears from 2001 to 2004, Dallas Cowboys in 2005, New Orleans Saints in 2005, and Buffalo Bills from 2006 to 2007.

== Early life ==
Thomas was born in Pineville, Louisiana, in 1977 and attended Winnfield Senior High School in Winnfield, Louisiana. He starred on the basketball, track, and football teams. He totaled 7,594 rushing yards and scored 682 points for the Winnfield tigers. He also set a state record with 106 career touchdowns while playing both running back and placekicker. He was named a first-team All-American and rated as the second-best running back in the country by the Prep Football Report.

== College career ==
Thomas enrolled at the University of Michigan in 1997. While playing at Michigan, he was given the nickname "A-Train" by Brent Musburger.

As a freshman, he was a member of the undefeated, national champion 1997 Michigan Wolverines football team. That year, he was the Wolverines' #2 running back (behind Chris Howard), twice rushed for over 100 yards (122 yards against Baylor and 129 yards against Iowa), and compiled a total of 549 rushing yards and 219 receiving yards. He was honored as the 1997 Big Ten Freshman Of the Year by both the conference coaches and media.

After his freshman year, Thomas led the Wolverines in rushing for three consecutive years with 893 yards in 1998, 1,297 yards in 1999, and 1,733 yards in 2000. His 1,733 rushing yards in 2000 remains the second highest single-season total in Michigan history. During the 2000 season, Thomas had nine games in which he rushed for over 100 yards, including 228 yards against Illinois, 199 yards against Northwestern, and 182 yards against both UCLA and Auburn. He was selected as a second-team All-Big Ten player in 1999 (coaches and media), and as a first-team All-Big Ten player in 2000 (coaches and media). He was also selected as both a team captain and most valuable player on the 2000 Michigan team.

Thomas's 4,472 rushing yards broke Jamie Morris' Michigan career rushing records. (Thomas's record was later broken by Mike Hart.) He also broke Tyrone Wheatley's modern Michigan career record with 56 touchdowns (Thomas's record was later broken by Blake Corum.) He also set and continues to hold Michigan records with an average of 144.4 rushing yards per game in 2000 and six games in a season with at least 150 rushing yards.

== Professional career ==
In April 2001, Thomas was selected by the Chicago Bears in the second round (38th overall pick) of the 2001 NFL draft. On October 21, 2001, Thomas set two Bears rookie records with 188 rushing yards and a 8.55 yards/carry average in a 24–0 victory over the Cincinnati Bengals. He set his third franchise rookie record in the season finale with 33 carries; he also had 160 yards and a touchdown in the clinching victory over Jacksonville. With 1,183 rushing yards during the 2001 season, Thomas helped lead the Bears to a 13–3 record and an NFC Central championship. In January 2002, he received the AP NFL Offensive Rookie of the Year for the 2001 season.

Thomas remained the Bears' top running back for two more years with 721 rushing yards in 2002 and 1,024 rushing yards in 2003. In 2004, Thomas Jones took over as the Bears' lead back, and Thomas was limited to 404 yards on 122 carries.

In May 2005, Thomas signed a one-year contract with the Dallas Cowboys and was expected to be the backup running back to Julius Jones. He appeared in six games, two as a starter, for the 2005 Cowboys, gaining only 80 yards on 36 carries. Thomas' ineffectiveness in limited duty, his inability to play special teams, and the emergence of Marion Barber III as the primary backup led Dallas to release him in November 2005. He was quickly signed by New Orleans after they lost Deuce McAllister with a season ending knee injury. Thomas appeared in only four games, all as a backup for the Saints, and gained 12 yards on seven carries.

On April 28, 2006, Thomas signed with the Buffalo Bills. In 2006, he appeared in 16 games, two as a starter, for the Bills, and gained 378 yards on 107 carries. The following year, he appeared in 10 games and gained 89 yards on 36 carries. He was placed on injured reserve in early December 2007.

== NFL career statistics ==
Year	Team	Games		Rushing					Receiving				
Year	Team	GP	GS	Att	Yds	Avg	Lng	TD	Rec	Yds	Avg	Lng	TD
2001	CHI	14	10	278	1,183	4.3	46	7	22	178	8.1	23	0
2002	CHI	12	12	214	721	3.4	34	6	24	163	6.8	19	0
2003	CHI	13	13	244	1,024	4.2	67	6	9	36	4.0	9	0
2004	CHI	12	2	122	404	3.3	41	2	17	132	7.8	30	0
2005	DAL	5	2	36	80	2.2	12	0	2	5	2.5	5	0
2005	NO	4	0	7	12	1.7	4	0	2	8	4.0	6	0
2006	BUF	16	2	107	378	3.5	19	2	22	139	6.3	18	0
2007	BUF	10	2	36	89	2.5	9	0	15	95	6.3	11	1
Career		86	43	1,044	3,891	3.7	67	23	113	756	6.7	30	1

== Coaching career ==
In 2011, Thomas served as the running backs coach at West Virginia Wesleyan College. He was promoted to special teams coordinator and assistant head coach in 2012.

In 2015, Thomas was selected for induction into the Louisiana Sports Hall of Fame.

== See also ==
- Michigan Wolverines football statistical leaders
