= 1998 Wisconsin Badgers football team =

American college football season

1998 Wisconsin Badgers football

Big Ten co-champion Rose Bowl champion

Rose Bowl, W 38–31 vs. UCLA
- Conference: Big Ten Conference

Ranking
- Coaches: No. 5
- AP: No. 6
- Record: 11–1 (7–1 Big Ten)
- Head coach: Barry Alvarez (9th season)
- Offensive coordinator: Brad Childress (7th season)
- Offensive scheme: Smashmouth
- Defensive coordinator: Kevin Cosgrove (4th season)
- Base defense: 4–3
- MVPs: Bob Adamov; Tom Burke; Matt Davenport; Aaron Gibson Eric Grams Cecil Martin Mike Samuel Mike Schneck Leonard Taylor
- Captains: Bob Adamov; Cecil Martin; Chris McIntosh; Donnel Thompson
- Home stadium: Camp Randall Stadium

1998 Big Ten Conference football standings
	Conf.			Overall
Team	W		L	W		L
No. 2 Ohio State %+	7	–	1	11	–	1
No. 6 Wisconsin $+	7	–	1	11	–	1
No. 12 Michigan +	7	–	1	10	–	3
No. 24 Purdue	6	–	2	9	–	4
No. 17 Penn State	5	–	3	9	–	3
Michigan State	4	–	4	6	–	6
Minnesota	2	–	6	5	–	6
Indiana	2	–	6	4	–	7
Illinois	2	–	6	3	–	8
Iowa	2	–	6	3	–	8
Northwestern	0	–	8	3	–	9
$ – BCS representative as conference champion; % – BCS at-large representative; + – Conference co-champions; Rankings from AP Poll

The 1998 Wisconsin Badgers football team was an American football team that represented the University of Wisconsin–Madison as a member of the Big Ten Conference during the 1998 NCAA Division I-A football season. In their ninth year under head coach Barry Alvarez, the Badgers compiled a 11–1 record (7–1 in conference games), finished in a three-way tie for the Big Ten championship, and outscored opponents by a total of 344 to 112. They were awarded the Big Ten's berth in the 1999 Rose Bowl under Big Ten tie-breaking rules. Wisconsin went on to defeat No. 6 UCLA, 38–31, in the Rose Bowl.

Running back Ron Dayne led the Big Ten with 1,279 rushing yards on 268 carries for an average of 4.8 yards per carry. He received first-team All-America honors from the Walter Camp Football Foundation. Offensive tackle Aaron Gibson and defensive end Tom Burke were consensus first-team All-Americans.

== Schedule ==
Date	Time	Opponent	Rank	Site	TV	Result	Attendance	Source
September 5	8:00 p.m.	at San Diego State*	No. 20	Qualcomm Stadium; San Diego, CA		W 26–14	37,471	
September 12	11:30 a.m.	Ohio*	No. 17	Camp Randall Stadium; Madison, WI	MSC	W 45–0	74,676	
September 19	1:00 p.m.	UNLV*	No. 14	Camp Randall Stadium; Madison, WI		W 52–7	75,044	
September 26	11:00 a.m.	Northwestern	No. 14	Camp Randall Stadium; Madison, WI	ESPN	W 38–7	78,337	
October 3	11:00 a.m.	at Indiana	No. 13	Memorial Stadium; Bloomington, IN	ESPN2	W 24–20	32,328	
October 10	7:30 p.m.	Purdue^{†}	No. 12	Camp Randall Stadium; Madison, WI	ESPN2	W 31–24	78,782	
October 17	11:00 a.m.	at Illinois	No. 9	Memorial Stadium; Champaign, IL	ESPN2	W 37–3	40,627	
October 24	2:30 p.m.	at Iowa	No. 9	Kinnick Stadium; Iowa City, IA (rivalry)	ABC	W 31–0	70,397	
November 7	11:00 a.m.	Minnesota	No. 8	Camp Randall Stadium; Madison, WI (rivalry)	ESPN	W 26–7	78,767	
November 14	11:00 a.m.	at No. 15 Michigan	No. 8	Michigan Stadium; Ann Arbor, MI	ESPN	L 10–27	111,217	
November 21	2:00 p.m.	No. 14 Penn State	No. 13	Camp Randall Stadium; Madison, WI	ESPN	W 24–3	78,964	
January 1, 1999	3:30 p.m.	vs. No. 6 UCLA*	No. 9	Rose Bowl; Pasadena, CA (Rose Bowl)	ABC	W 38–31	93,872	
*Non-conference game; ^{†}Homecoming; Rankings from AP Poll released prior to the game; All times are in Central time

== Rankings ==
Ranking movements Legend: ██ Increase in ranking ██ Decrease in ranking
	Week															
Poll	Pre	1	2	3	4	5	6	7	8	9	10	11	12	13	14	Final
AP	20	17	14	14	13	12	9	9	9	8	8	13	10	8	9	6
Coaches Poll	20	17	14	14	13	10	9	8	8	7	6	12	9	8	8	5
BCS	Not released								9	8	9	13	10	9	9	Not released

== Game summaries ==
=== UCLA (Rose Bowl) ===
Wisconsin vs. UCLA
(Rose Bowl)

Team	1	2	3	4	Total
• #9 Badgers	7	17	7	7	38
#6 UCLA	7	14	7	3	31

- Date: January 1, 1999
- Location: Rose Bowl
  Pasadena, California
- Game start: 12:30 PST
- Game attendance: 93,872
- Game weather: 74 °F (23 °C), Sunny
- TV announcers (ABC): Keith Jackson and Bob Griese

Scoring summary
1	WIS	Ron Dayne 54-yard run (Matt Davenport kick)	WIS 7–0
1	UCLA	Jermaine Lewis 38-yard pass from Cade McNown (Chris Sailer kick)	Tied 7–7
2	WIS	Dayne 7-yard run (Davenport kick)	WIS 14–7
2	UCLA	Durell Price 61-yard pass from Freddie Mitchell (Sailer kick)	Tied 14–14
2	UCLA	Danny Farmer 41-yard pass from McNown (Sailer kick)	UCLA 21–14
2	WIS	Dayne 10-yard run (Davenport kick)	Tied 21–21
2	WIS	Davenport 40-yard field goal	WIS 24–21
3	WIS	Dayne 22-yard run (Davenport kick)	WIS 31–21
3	UCLA	Lewis 10-yard run (Sailer kick)	WIS 31–28
4	WIS	Jamar Fletcher 46-yard interception return (Davenport kick)	WIS 38–28
4	UCLA	UCLA – Sailer 30-yard field goal	WIS 38–31

== Personnel ==
=== Roster ===
1998 Wisconsin Badgers football team roster
Players
Coaches
Offense

Pos.	#	Name	Class
TE	81	Mark Anelli	Fr
WR	7	Willie Austin	Jr
RB	29	Michael Bennett	Fr
QB	5	Brooks Bollinger	Fr
WR	17	Demetrius Brown	Jr
FB	25	Marcus Carpenter	Jr
WR	88	Chris Chambers	So
G	54	Dave Costa	So
OT	66	Pat Daley	Jr
RB	39	Carlos Daniels	Fr
WR	22	Nick Davis	Fr
RB	33	Ron Dayne	Jr
OL	55	Jason Eck	Jr
RB	4	Eddie Faulkner	So
G	60	Bill Ferrario	So
OT	79	Aaron Gibson	Sr
WR	18	Rasheed Golden	So
TE	89	Eric Grams	Sr
G	78	Kevin Kampmann	Jr
QB	12	Scott Kavanagh	Jr
FB	41	Chad Kuhns	Fr
FB	37	Cecil Martin (C)	Sr
OT	75	Chris McIntosh (C)	Jr
WR	1	Ahmad Merritt	Jr
C	70	Casey Rabach	So
TE	87	Dague Retzlaff	So
C, G	53	Rob Roell	Jr
QB	10	Mike Samuel	Sr
TE	85	John Sigmund	So
TE	86	Mike Solwold	So
OT	68	Mark Tauscher	Jr
FB	38	Matt Unertl	So
RB	13	Tony Williams	Jr

Defense

Pos.	#	Name	Class
LB	29	Bob Adamov	Sr
S	6	Joey Boese	Fr
DT	77	Wendell Bryant	Fr
DE	74	Tom Burke	Sr
DB	31	Carlease Clark	Fr
S	8	Jason Doering	So
CB	36	Mike Echols	Fr
DE	50	Donny Eicher	Jr
DE	96	John Favret	So
CB	2	Jamar Fletcher	Fr
LB	16	Chris Ghidorzi	Jr
LB	38	Pat Gill	Jr
LB	49	Nick Greisen	Fr
LB	42	Ben Herbert	Fr
NT	58	Chris Janek	Jr
CB	24	Donte King	So
LB	19	Roger Knight	So
DT	78	Ross Kolodziej	So
LB	45	Dan Lisowski	Fr
NT	98	Eric Mahlik	So
S	30	Ryan Marks	So
LB	43	Delante McGrew	Fr
DE	9	Sam Mueller	So
S	26	Bobby Myers	Jr
DT	94	George Pratt	Fr
S	15	Tim Rosga	Jr
DE	99	Jake Sprague	Fr
S	34	Leonard Taylor	Sr
LB	32	Bryson Thompson	Fr
LB	44	Donnel Thompson (C)	Jr
DT	95	Erik Waisanen	Jr
DT	92	Brandon Williams	Sr

Special teams

Pos.	#	Name	Class
K	28	Matt Davenport	Sr
K	20	Vitaly Pisetsky	Jr
LS	46	Mike Schneck	Sr
P	23	Eric Skrzypchak	Jr
P	14	Kevin Stemke	So

Head coach

- Barry Alvarez

Coordinators/assistant coaches

- Brad Childress – Offensive Coordinator/Quarterbacks
- Kevin Cosgrove – Defensive Coordinator/Inside Linebackers
- Tim Davis – Tight Ends
- Phil Elmassian – Defensive Backs
- Jay Hayes – Outside Linebackers/Special Teams
- Jim Hueber – Offensive Line
- Henry Mason – Wide Receivers
- John Palermo – Assistant Head Coach/Defensive Line
- Brian White – Running Backs
- Bernie Wyatt – Director of Football Operations

Legend

- (C) Team captain
- (S) Suspended
- (I) Ineligible
- Injured
- Redshirt

Roster

=== Regular starters ===
Position	Player
Quarterback	Mike Samuel
Running back	Ron Dayne
Fullback	Cecil Martin
Wide receiver	Chris Chambers
Wide receiver	Ahmad Merritt
Tight end	Dague Retzlaff/Eric Grams
Left tackle	Chris McIntosh
Left guard	Bill Ferrario
Center	Casey Rabach
Right guard	Dave Costa
Right tackle	Aaron Gibson

Position	Player
Defensive end	Tom Burke
Defensive tackle	Ross Kolodziej
Nose Guard	Eric Mahlik
Defensive end	John Favret
Outside linebacker	Bob Adamov
Inside linebacker	Donnel Thompson
Outside linebacker	Chris Ghidorzi
Cornerback	Mike Echols
Free safety	Jason Doering
Strong safety	Leonard Taylor
Cornerback	Jamar Fletcher

== Statistical achievements ==
The Badgers gained an average of 100.8 passing yards and 187.3 rushing yards per game. On defense, they gave up an average of 165.6 passing yards and 82.2 rushing yards per game.

Running back Ron Dayne led the Big Ten with 1,279 rushing yards and 11 touchdowns on 268 carries (4.8 yards per carry).

Quarterback Mike Samuel completed 81 of 155 passes (52.3%) for 1,021 yards, six touchdowns, four interceptions, and a 115.2 passer rating. Samuel also tallied 317 rushing yards.

Kicker Matt Davenport led the team in scoring with 99 points, converting 37 of 39 extra point kicks and 18 of 20 field goal attempts.

Wide receiver Chris Chambers was the team's leading receiver with 26 catches for 537 yards. His average of 20.7 yards per receptions was the highest in the Big Ten.

== Awards and honors ==
Defensive end Tom Burke and senior offensive tackle Aaron Gibson were consensus first-team picks on the 1998 All-America college football team. Burke was a unanimous pick. Burke also received the Bill Willis Trophy as the best defensive lineman in college football, and was selected by the media as the Big Ten defensive player of the year and by the coaches as the Big Ten defensive lineman of the year.

Junior tailback Ron Dayne was selected as a first-team All-American by the WCFF. He was also named the player of the game in the 1999 Rose Bowl after gaining 246 yards and scoring four touchdowns.

Eight Wisconsin players received first- or second-team honors on the 1998 All-Big Ten Conference football team: Dayne (Coaches-1, Media-1); senior kicker Matt Davenport (Coaches-1, Media-1); Burke (Coaches-1, Media-1); Gibson (Coaches-2, Media-1); sophomore punter Kevin Stemke (Coaches-1, Media-1); freshman cornerback Jamar Fletcher (Coaches-2, Media-1); center Casey Rabach (Coaches-2, Media-2); and offensive tackle Chris McIntosh (Coaches-2).

Barry Alvarez was also selected as the Big Ten coach of the year.

== 1999 NFL draft ==
Player	Position	Round	Pick	NFL club
Aaron Gibson	Tackle	1	27	Detroit Lions
Tom Burke	Linebacker	3	83	Arizona Cardinals
Cecil Martin	Fullback	6	Philadelphia Eagles	
