= 1973 Rose Bowl =

American college football game

- 59th Rose Bowl Game; National Championship Game (Note: Through luck and fortuitous scheduling, a "national championship game" was occasionally able to settle the matter on the field, as described in some contemporaneous reports. Despite the promotional billing, in several instances there were plausible scenarios for a third team to be selected as national champion by the major selectors, depending on outcomes of other games.) (Note: One-loss Oklahoma, No. 2 in final regular season polls, won the Sugar Bowl and remained No. 2 after the bowls.)
Ohio State Buckeyes	USC Trojans
(9–1)	(11–0)
Big Ten	Pac-8
17	42
Head coach: Woody Hayes	Head coach: John McKay
AP / Coaches; 3 / 3	AP / Coaches; 1 / 1
	1	2	3	4	Total
Ohio State	0	7	3	7	17
USC	7	0	21	14	42
- Date: January 1, 1973
- Season: 1972
- Stadium: Rose Bowl
- Location: Pasadena, California
- MVP: Sam Cunningham (USC RB)
- Favorite: USC by 14 points
- National anthem: The Ohio State University Marching Band
- Referee: Paul Kamanski (Pac-8) (split crew: Pac-8, Big Ten)
- Halftime show: Spirit of Troy, The Ohio State University Marching Band
- Attendance: 106,869 (Bowl game and stadium record)

United States TV coverage
- Network: NBC
- Announcers: Curt Gowdy, Al DeRogatis
- Nielsen ratings: 30.0

The 1973 Rose Bowl was the 59th edition of the college football bowl game, played at the Rose Bowl in Pasadena, California, on Monday, January 1. It matched the undefeated and top-ranked USC Trojans of the Pacific-8 Conference with the #3 Ohio State Buckeyes of the Big Ten Conference. The game was a de facto national championship game, both teams competing for the Associated Press (AP) title, with #2 Oklahoma having won its bowl game for a potential title claim.

USC running back Sam Cunningham scored four touchdowns in the second half and was named the Player of the Game, as the favored Trojans won 42–17. They were unanimous national champions in both major polls, the first time in college football history. (The final UPI Coaches Poll was released prior to the bowl games, in early December.)

The attendance of 106,869 set the stadium record, as well as the NCAA bowl game record.

== Teams ==
The national championship was on the line for #1 USC, and likely #3 Ohio State. Although #2 Oklahoma already had defeated Penn State in the Sugar Bowl on New Year's Eve to finish their season 11–1, a win in the Rose Bowl for the Buckeyes might well have swayed the voters to put Ohio State at #1.

=== USC ===
The USC Trojans won all eleven games in the 1972 regular season. Their opener against #4 Arkansas propelled them to the top of the polls, where they remained throughout the season. They had help from new head coach Pepper Rodgers' UCLA Bruins, who had defeated #1 Nebraska to start the season, led by junior college transfer quarterback Mark Harmon. The Trojans' closest contest was a 30–21 defeat of #15 Stanford. In the UCLA–USC rivalry game with the Rose Bowl on the line for both teams, the Bruins were outmatched by the Trojans 24–7. USC then soundly defeated Notre Dame 45–23 behind the six touchdowns of Anthony Davis. Quarterbacking duties were shared by Mike Rae and Pat Haden. The Trojans were favored by two touchdowns in this Rose Bowl, the first of three consecutive appearances, all against Ohio State.

=== Ohio State ===
This was the first year that freshmen were eligible for varsity football in the University Division (now FBS) due to the NCAA rescinding an earlier rule, and it was the first of four Rose Bowl appearances for freshman Archie Griffin. Ohio State had one loss at Michigan State, 19–12 on November 11. USC had demolished the Spartans 51–6 only five weeks earlier in a night game at the Coliseum. Against rival Michigan, the Rose Bowl was on the line for both teams; the Big Ten had rescinded its long-standing "no repeat" rule, so Michigan was eligible to play in the Rose Bowl for a second straight year, and the unbeaten Wolverines were a slight favorite over the Buckeyes in Columbus. However, Ohio State used a defensive goal line stand in the first half and another in the second half to beat #3 Michigan 14–11. The Buckeyes and Wolverines shared the Big Ten title, and the conference's athletic directors voted to give Ohio State the Rose Bowl bid. Because the Big Ten and Pac-8 did not yet permit teams to play in any postseason game except the Rose Bowl, the Wolverines stayed at home. The two conferences allowed multiple bowl teams starting with the 1975 season.

== Game summary ==
At the half, the score was tied at seven. USC running back Sam Cunningham exploded for four touchdowns in the second half and Anthony Davis added another as the Trojans coasted to a 32-point lead. Ohio State scored a touchdown in the last minute and the final score was 42–17. It was the fourth consecutive win for the Pac-8, but that streak ended in the next year's rematch.

=== Scoring ===
==== First quarter ====
- USC – Lynn Swann 10-yard pass from Mike Rae (Rae kick), 1:30

==== Second quarter ====
- OSU – Randy Keith 1-yard run (Blair Conway kick), 13:37

==== Third quarter ====
- USC – Sam Cunningham 2-yard run (Rae kick), 12:18
- OSU – Conway 21-yard field goal, 8:11
- USC – Anthony Davis 20-yard run (Rae kick), 5:51
- USC – Cunningham 1-yard run (Rae kick), 1:25

==== Fourth quarter ====
- USC – Cunningham 1-yard run (Rae kick), 9:10
- USC – Cunningham 1-yard run (Rae kick), 5:13
- OSU – John Bledsoe 5 run (Conway kick), 0:34

=== Statistics ===
Statistics	Ohio State	USC
First downs	21	24
Rushes–yards	62–285	45–207
Passing yards	81	244
Passes	5–11–2	19–27–0
Total yards	366	451
Punts–average	5–36	4–41
Fumbles–lost	2–1	2–1
Turnovers by	3	1
Penalties–yards	2–7	6–48

== Aftermath ==
=== Rose Bowl records ===
Cunningham set three modern Rose Bowl records with four touchdowns in his final college football game. As of 2008, the records for touchdowns, rushing touchdowns and points scored have been matched by Eric Ball (1986), Ron Dayne (1999), and Vince Young (2006).

A Rose Bowl record for most points in a half at 45 was set in the second half (USC 35, Ohio State 10). This was later tied in 1999 (Wisconsin 24, UCLA 21) and surpassed by USC and Texas with 53 points in the second half in 2006.

The record attendance of this year was later approached, but never be matched again in the Rose Bowl. In 1998, the Rose Bowl stadium was renovated and had its seating capacity reduced, and was no longer the largest football stadium in the United States. As of the 2008 Rose Bowl game, the Rose Bowl game still draws the largest crowds of any post-season college football contest.

=== Ohio State–USC ===
This was the first of three Ohio State-USC matchups in the Rose Bowl in the 1970s. It was the first of four consecutive Rose Bowl appearances for the Buckeyes under head coach Woody Hayes and two-time Heisman trophy winner Archie Griffin. Prior to the game contest, Hayes pushed a camera into the face of a local news photographer, screaming, "That'll take care of you, you son of a bitch." Hayes was ejected and left California with a subpoena. The Buckeyes won the rematch the following year, the sole Rose Bowl victory for the Big Ten in the 1970s.

=== NFL players ===
The 1972 Trojans had 33 players selected in the next several NFL drafts, including five first-round selections: Charle Young, Sam Cunningham, Pete Adams, Lynn Swann, and Steve Riley. The 1972 Trojan team was named one of the best teams of the Twentieth century. The Buckeyes had eight eventual NFL first round selections: Tim Fox, Archie Griffin, Kurt Schumacher, Doug France, Neal Colzie, John Hicks, Rick Middleton, and Randy Gradishar

== Legacy ==
Sports announcer Keith Jackson identified the 1972 USC Trojans as the greatest team he ever saw. Sportswriter Beano Cook placed them at third of his all time teams on the basis of that assertion. The Sporting News ranked the 1972 Trojans in their top 25 greatest teams.

=== Quotes ===
"I never saw any team that could beat them," USC head coach John McKay said.

Washington State head coach Jim Sweeney disagreed. "USC's not the No. 1 team in the country," said Sweeney, whose Cougars endured a 44–3 loss to the Trojans. "The [1972] Miami Dolphins are better."

== Bibliography ==
- University of Southern California football media guide. (PDF copy available at www.usctrojans.com)
- Ohio State University football media guide. (PDF copy available at www.ohiostatebuckeyes.com)
- College Football's Twenty-Five Greatest Teams: The Sporting News. ISBN 0-89204-281-8
- Park, Jack (2003). The Official Ohio State Football Encyclopedia: National Championship Edition. Sports Publishing LLC. ISBN 1-58261-695-7.
