= Wisconsin Badgers football =

American college football team

2026 Wisconsin Badgers football team
- First season: 1889; 137 years ago
- Athletic director: Shawn Eichorst
- General manager: Morocco Brown
- Head coach: Luke Fickell; 5th season, 22–23 (.489)
- Location: Madison, Wisconsin
- Stadium: Camp Randall Stadium (capacity: 76,057)
- Field: Barry Alvarez Field
- NCAA division: Division I FBS
- Conference: Big Ten
- Colors: Cardinal and white
- All-time record: 748–524–53 (.585)
- Bowl record: 19–16 (.543)

National championships
- Unclaimed: 1912, 1942

Conference championships
- Big Ten: 1896, 1897, 1901, 1906, 1912, 1952, 1959, 1962, 1993, 1998, 1999, 2010, 2011, 2012

Division championships
- Big Ten Leaders: 2011 Big Ten West: 2014, 2016, 2017, 2019
- Heisman winners: Alan Ameche – 1954; Ron Dayne – 1999
- Consensus All-Americans: 32
- Rivalries: Minnesota (rivalry); Iowa (rivalry); Nebraska (rivalry)

Uniforms
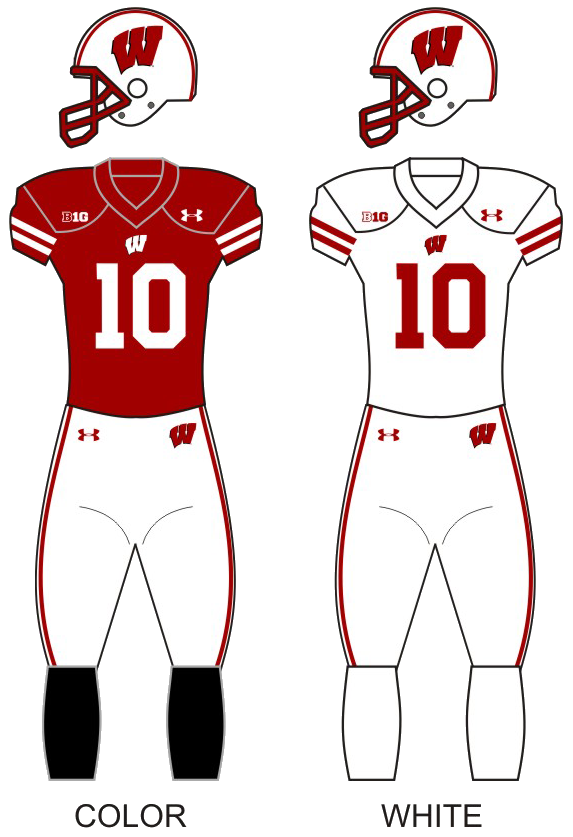
- Fight song: On, Wisconsin!
- Mascot: Bucky Badger
- Marching band: University of Wisconsin Marching Band
- Outfitter: Under Armour
- Website: uwbadgers.com

The Wisconsin Badgers football program represents the University of Wisconsin–Madison in the sport of American football. Wisconsin competes in the Football Bowl Subdivision (FBS) of the National Collegiate Athletic Association (NCAA) within the Big Ten Conference (Big Ten). The Badgers have competed in the Big Ten since its formation in 1896. They play their home games at Camp Randall Stadium, the third oldest stadium in college football.

Wisconsin is one of 26 College football programs to win 700 or more games. The program has been one of the most successful since the 1990s. Wisconsin has had two Heisman Trophy winners, Alan Ameche and Ron Dayne, and has had twelve former players inducted into the College Football Hall of Fame.

== History ==
=== Team name origin ===
The team's nickname originates in the early history of Wisconsin. In the 1820s and 1830s, prospectors came to the state looking for minerals, primarily lead. Without shelter in the winter, the miners had to "live like badgers" in tunnels burrowed into hillsides.

=== The early years (1889–1912) ===
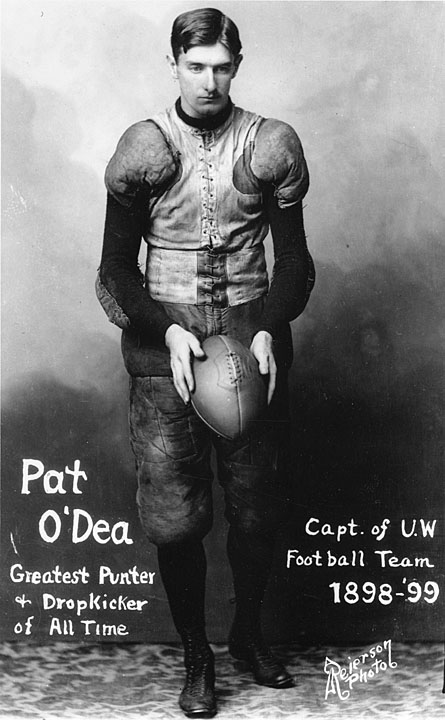
Pat "Kangaroo Kicker" O'Dea, here as captain of the 1898–99 team

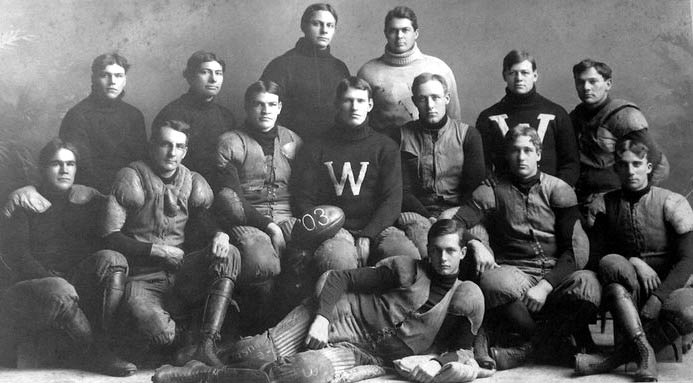
The 1903 team

The first Badger football team took the field in 1889, losing the only two games it played that season. In 1890, Wisconsin earned its first victory with a 106–0 drubbing of Whitewater Normal School (now the University of Wisconsin–Whitewater), still the most lopsided win in school history. However, the very next week the Badgers suffered what remains their most lopsided defeat, a humiliating 63–0 loss at the hands of the University of Minnesota. The Badgers and Gophers have met a total of 135 times, making Wisconsin vs Minnesota the most-played rivalry in the Football Bowl Subdivision.

Upon the formation of the Big Ten conference in 1896, Wisconsin became the first-ever conference champion with a 7–1–1 record. Over the next ten years, the Badgers won or shared the conference title three more times (1897, 1901, and 1906), and recorded their first undefeated season, going 9–0–0 (1901). With the exception of their second undefeated season in 1912, in which they won their fifth Big Ten title.

=== Moderate successes (1913–1941) ===
The 1912 season would be their last conference title until 1952. The team posted mostly winning seasons over the next several seasons however.

=== The climb back to dominance (1942–1962) ===
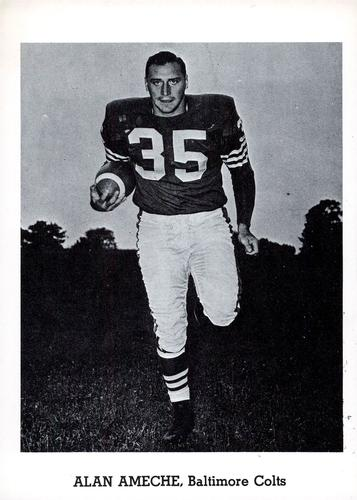
1954 Heisman Trophy winner, FB Alan Ameche

1942 was an important year for Wisconsin football. On October 24, the No. 6 ranked Badgers defeated the No. 1 ranked Ohio State Buckeyes at Camp Randall, catapulting Wisconsin to the No. 2 spot in the AP poll. Unfortunately for the Badgers, their national championship hopes were dashed in a 6–0 defeat by the Iowa Hawkeyes the following week. Nevertheless, Wisconsin won the remainder of its games, finishing the season 8–1–1 and No. 3 in the AP, while garnering the Helms Athletic Foundation vote for National Champion, giving the program its only National Championship to date (the AP National Champions were the Ohio State Buckeyes, whom Wisconsin beat during the season). Afterwards, the Badgers struggled to regain their momentum, with their efforts hampered by many of their star players leaving as a result of World War II. In the late 1940s, fans began insisting that head coach Harry Stuhldreher resign, many times chanting "Goodbye Harry", especially during 1948, where the Badgers finished 2–7. Stuhldreher stepped down as head coach, while keeping his duties as athletic director. Stuhldreher then named Ivy Williamson as head coach

The Badgers experienced great success during the 1950s under Williamson, finishing in the AP Top 25 eight times that decade. In one stretch, from 1950 to 1954, the Badgers went 26-8-3. The Badgers' success during those seasons was defined by a stout defense, dubbed "The Hard Rocks", which usually finished in the top 5 of the nation in overall defense, including leading the nation in 1951. In 1952, the team received its first No. 1 ranking by the Associated Press. That season, the Badgers again claimed the Big Ten title and earned their first trip to the Rose Bowl. There they were defeated 7–0 by the Southern California, and would finish the season ranked No. 11 in the AP. In 1954 after a 7–2 season, Wisconsin's Alan Ameche became the first Badger to win the Heisman Trophy. Ivy Williamson stepped down as head coach in 1955 to become athletic director, and was replaced by his former assistant coach, Milt Bruhn. Bruhn would continue Wisconsin's success, after an initial setback with a 1-5-3 record in 1956. Wisconsin returned to the Rose Bowl as Big Ten Champions in 1959, but fell to the Washington Huskies, 44–8.

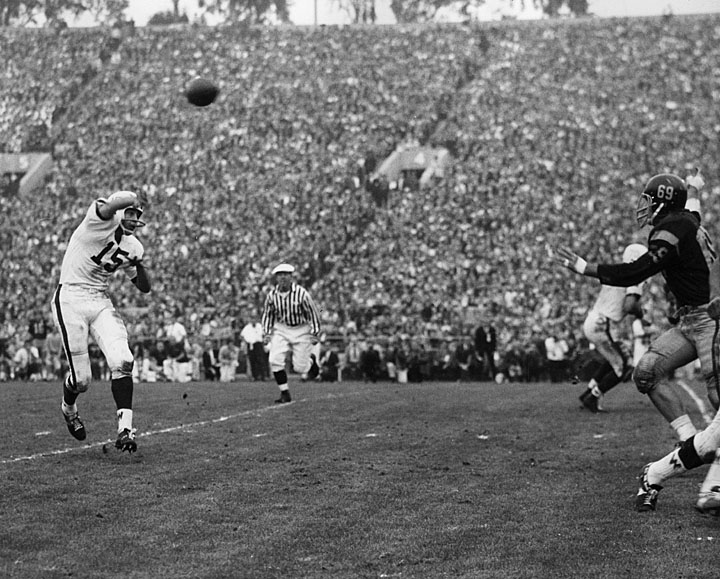
Wisconsin QB Ron Vander Kelen attempting a pass in the 1963 Rose Bowl, the first No. 1 vs. No. 2 match-up in a bowl game

Continuing under the direction of Bruhn in 1962, the Badgers had another landmark season, spearheaded by the passing combination of Ron Vander Kelen to All-American Pat Richter. The Badgers standout victory was an upset of No. 1-ranked Northwestern, who were coached then by the legendary Ara Parseghian. The Badgers finished 8–1, earned their eighth Big Ten title, and faced the top-ranked USC Trojans in the Rose Bowl. Despite a narrow 42–37 defeat, the Badgers still ended the season ranked No. 2 in both the AP and Coaches polls (post-bowl rankings were not introduced until later in the decade).

=== Limited successes (1963–1989) ===
Following the successful 1962 campaign, Wisconsin football scuffled, and Milt Bruhn resigned in 1966 after three straight losing seasons. Wisconsin chose former assistant coach John Coatta as Bruhn's replacement. The Badgers finished even worse under Coatta, going winless for 23 straight games from 1967 to 1969, and winning only 3 games overall during Coatta's short reign, each of the wins occurring during the 1969 season.

In 1970, new athletic director Elroy Hirsch named John Jardine as head coach. While the Badgers weren't a consistent winner under Jardine, the program regained stability, and also brought excitement in running backs Rufus "Roadrunner" Ferguson and Billy Marek, who ran behind blocking led by future Pittsburgh Steelers and Pro Football Hall of Fame center Mike Webster.. The Badgers went 37-47-3 under Jardine, who stepped down in 1977.

After more subpar seasons from 1978 to 1980, the team had a string of seven-win seasons from 1981 to 1984 under Dave McClain. During that time the Badgers played in the Garden State Bowl (1981), Independence Bowl (1982), and Hall of Fame Classic Bowl (1984). McClain's death during spring practice in 1986 sent the Badgers into free fall. From 1986 to 1990 with interim coach Jim Hilles and then Don Morton, the Badgers won a total of nine games.

=== Barry Alvarez era, "From Red Ink to Roses" (1990–2005) ===
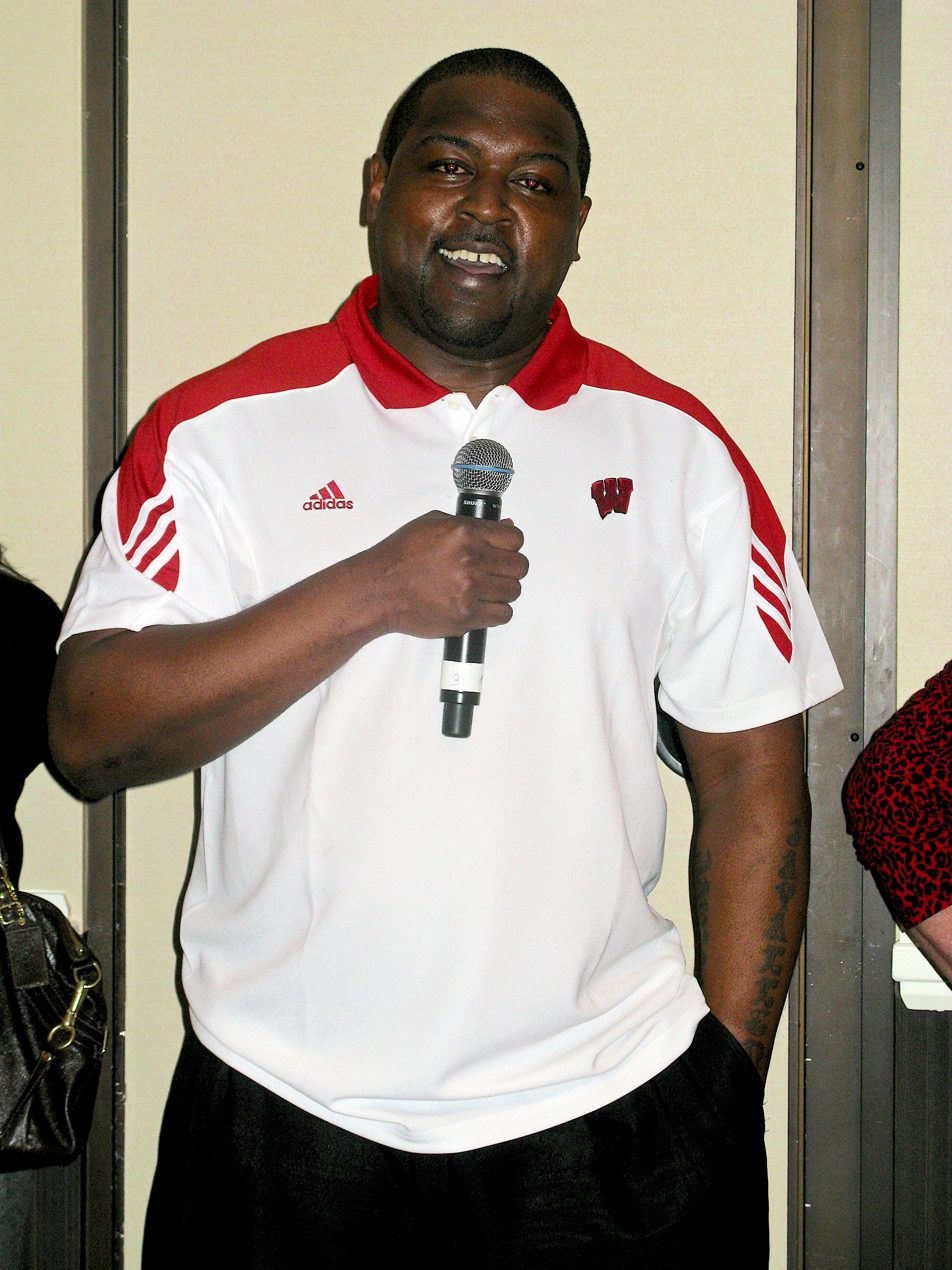
1999 Heisman Trophy winner, RB Ron Dayne

By the end of the 1989 season, the Wisconsin football program was in disarray, shouldering a debt of over $2 million and with only 30,000 fans attending games at the 77,000-capacity stadium. New athletic director Pat Richter named Barry Alvarez, the defensive coordinator at Notre Dame, as the new head coach. To bring stability and interest to the program again, Alvarez targeted the top high school players in Wisconsin, "building a wall" around the state, and also encouraged players not recruited to join the program as walk-ons. Though Alvarez won his first game as head coach over Ball State, the Badgers finished 1–10 in 1990. The Badgers finished 5–6 in the next two seasons, but there were encouraging signs for the future. Wisconsin was in bowl contention on the last day of the 1992 season, but a narrow loss to Northwestern kept them from the postseason.

Everything finally came together for the Badgers in 1993. They steamrolled through the season, finishing 10-1-1, winning their first Big Ten championship since 1962 and beating UCLA 21–16 to claim their first Rose Bowl victory.

After the surprise success of 1993, the Badgers fell back into mediocrity, though remaining competitive, going 2–1 in bowl games from 1994 to 1997, with victories in the Hall of Fame Bowl in 1994, and the Copper Bowl in 1996. Alvarez retooled the team with a new batch of talented recruits during this stretch of seasons, and they came to full fruition in 1998 and 1999. Among the standouts were cornerback Jamar Fletcher, wide receiver Chris Chambers, quarterback Brooks Bollinger, offensive linemen Aaron Gibson, Chris McIntosh, and Mark Tauscher, and running back Ron Dayne. With "The Great Dayne" leading the way, the Badgers won back-to-back Big Ten championships and back-to-back Rose Bowls over UCLA in 1999 and Stanford in 2000. The 1998 team won a school-record 11 games, while the 1999 team won its first outright Big Ten title since 1962. Ron Dayne set a new NCAA record for career rushing yardage, and won the Heisman Trophy in 1999.

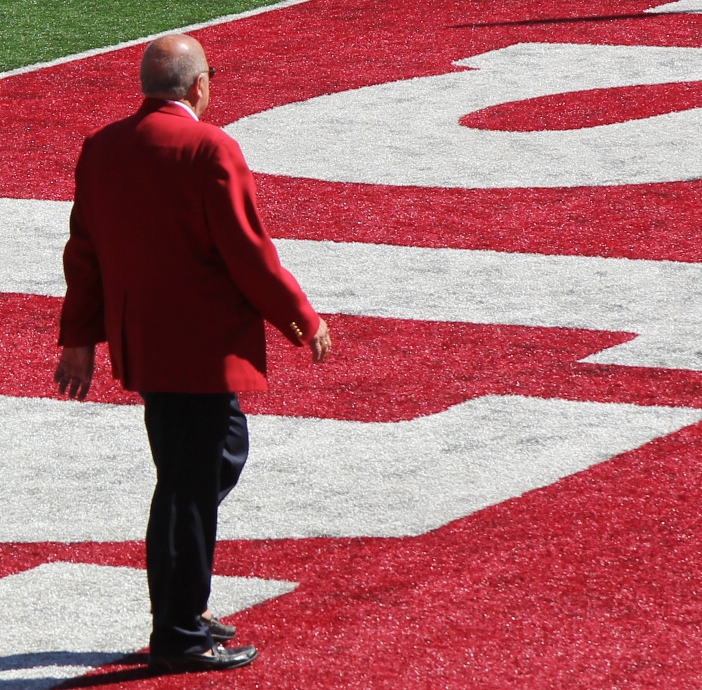
Coach Barry Alvarez in 2014

In 2000, there were hopes of the Badgers winning their third consecutive Big Ten championship and an unprecedented three straight Rose Bowls. However early in the season, Wisconsin's football and basketball programs were hit with "The Shoe Box scandal", when a local shoe store gave university athletes discounts on footwear. Wisconsin athletic programs were put on five years of probation and several players were suspended by the NCAA. The Badgers finished 9–4, with a victory over UCLA in the Sun Bowl.

Due to the loss of scholarships as a result of the NCAA investigation, the Badgers struggled through the 2001–2003 seasons, never finishing higher than seventh in the Big Ten. The Badgers returned to the top 20 in the AP polls in 2004 and 2005, with a victory in the Capitol One Bowl in 2005. In 2004, Alvarez was named athletic director, replacing the retiring Pat Richter. The strain of holding both roles became too much for Alvarez, and he stepped down as head coach after the 2005 season.

Alvarez coached the Badgers for 16 seasons, finishing with a 118-73-4 record, three times finishing in the Top 10 in the AP polls, and the only Big Ten head coach to win back-to-back Rose Bowls.

=== Bret Bielema era (2006–2012) ===
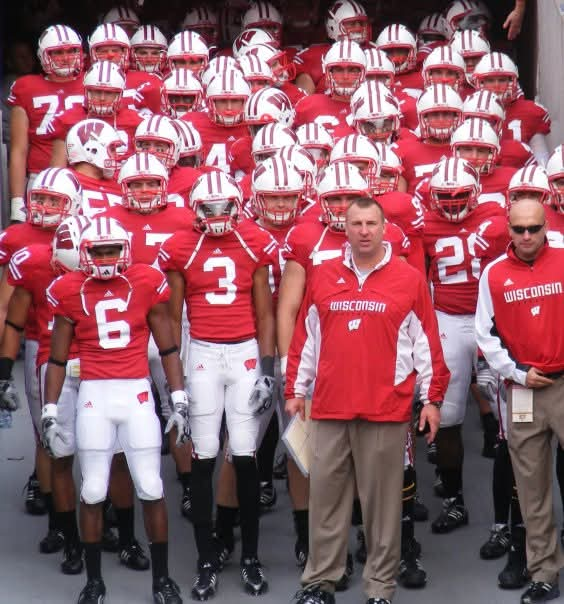
Bret Bielema before a game in Madison

Following the 2005 season, Alvarez resigned as head coach in order to focus on his duties as athletic director, a position he had assumed in 2004. He named his defensive coordinator, Bret Bielema, as his successor. Wisconsin's 2006 team went 12-1 and won the Capital One Bowl over Arkansas 17–14. Wisconsin finished the season ranked 5th in coaches poll and 7th in the AP Poll. From 2006 to 2011, Bielema led the Badgers to six consecutive bowl appearances, going 2–4. In 2010, the Badgers won a share of the Big Ten Championship and returned to the Rose Bowl for the first time since 2000. There they were defeated 21–19 by the No. 3 ranked TCU Horned Frogs. In 2011, the Badgers were once again crowned Big Ten Champs when they defeated Michigan State in the first-ever conference championship game. The victory sent Wisconsin back to the Rose Bowl for a second consecutive year, where they were defeated by the Pac-12 champion Oregon Ducks, 45–38.

The 2012 season ended with the Badgers winning a third consecutive Big Ten title. Despite finishing with a 7–5 record and third in the Leaders Division, the Badgers advanced to the Big Ten Championship game by virtue of the fact that Penn State and Ohio State were ineligible for postseason play. A dominating rushing performance led Wisconsin to a 70–31 victory over No. 12 ranked Nebraska in the Big Ten Championship game. Only days later, Bret Bielema resigned to become the head coach of the Arkansas Razorbacks. Gary Andersen, formerly coach of Utah State University, was named head coach on December 19, 2012. At the request of the team captains, Barry Alvarez named himself interim coach for the 2013 Rose Bowl, where the Badgers lost, 20–14 to Stanford. Bret Bielema finished his coaching career at Wisconsin with a 68–24 record a 74 percent winning percentage 3 top 10 finishes 6 top 25 finishes 3 Big ten titles and 7 straight winning seasons won ten or more games 4 out of 7 years.

=== Gary Andersen era (2013–2014) ===
Gary Andersen was hired in December 2012 after Bret Bielema resigned to become the head coach for the University of Arkansas. Andersen was previously the head coach for Utah State where he went 26–23 in his four years at Utah State with his last season being 11-2 and finishing first in the Western Athletic Conference. Andersen's first win as the Badgers coach was a 45–0 win against Massachusetts. His first Big Ten football victory was a 41–10 victory over Purdue. The Badgers ended 2013 with a 9–4 record after losing to No. 8 South Carolina Gamecocks in the Capital One Bowl.

The Badgers started out the 2014 season ranked No. 14 in the AP Poll and their season opener was against No. 13 LSU Tigers in Houston, after leading the Tigers through three quarters the Tigers came back from a 24–7 deficit to defeat the Badgers 28–24. The Badgers recorded their first road shutout since 1998 in a 37–0 victory over the Big Ten newcomers Rutgers Scarlet Knights. On November 15, junior running back Melvin Gordon broke the all-time FBS single-game rushing yards record with 408 yards in a 59–24 victory against the Nebraska Cornhuskers. However that record only lasted a week as Samaje Perine from Oklahoma rushed for 427 yards the very next week. The 2014 regular season ended with the Badgers taking 1st place in the West Division with a 10–2 record. Wisconsin played Ohio State for the conference title in the 2014 Big Ten Championship Game where the Badgers lost to Ohio State 59–0. It was the first time since 1997 that the Badgers were shutout and the worst loss since 1979 when Ohio State defeated the Badgers 59–0.

Andersen departed Wisconsin four days later, taking the vacant head coaching position at Oregon State. Andersen cited family as his rationale for taking the Oregon State position; however, it was reported by some media outlets, such as Fox Sports and Sports Illustrated, that Andersen was frustrated with the university's high academic standards for athletes. Those reports turned out to be accurate, and were confirmed by Andersen in January 2015. Andersen had to pay a $3 million buyout for departing within the first two years of his contract, which was set through January 2019. At the request of the teams' seniors, Barry Alvarez named himself interim coach for the 2015 Outback Bowl vs. Auburn on January 1, 2015. Wisconsin won the game 34–31 in overtime. Gary Andersen finished his coaching career at Wisconsin with a 19–7 record a 73 percent winning percentage with one Big Ten west division title.

=== Paul Chryst Era (2015–2022) ===
After the departure of Gary Andersen, former Badgers offensive coordinator (2005-2011) and Pitt head coach (2012-2014) Paul Chryst, was hired as the next head coach of the Wisconsin Badgers. The only assistant coach to remain on the coaching staff after Andersen's departure was defensive coordinator Dave Aranda. Chryst brought over six coaching staff from the University of Pittsburgh, Joe Rudolph (OC), John Settle (RB coach), Inoke Breckterfield (D-line), Chris Haering (special teams), Mickey Turner (TE coach) and Ross Kolodziej (strength and conditioning). From 2005 to 2011 Rudolph (TE coach) and Settle (RB coach) were assistant coaches under Chryst (OC). Mickey Turner and Ross Kolodziej are both former Badgers players, Turner was a tight end from 2006 to 2009 and Kolodziej was a defensive tackle from 1997 to 2000.

In Chryst's first season the Badgers went 10–3, finished the season ranked 20th in the nation, and finished 1st nationally in scoring defense (13.7 points per game) and 2nd in total defense (268.5 yards per game). All three losses came to teams that were in the AP top 25 at the end of the season, eventual national champions No. 1 Alabama, No. 9 Iowa and No. 23 Northwestern. Chryst also won the Holiday Bowl against USC, whom the Badgers had a 0–6 record against before the game, with their last meeting being the 1963 Rose Bowl. Two days after their victory over USC it was announced that the Badgers defensive coordinator, Dave Aranda, would be taking the same role for the LSU Tigers, whom the Badgers opened the 2016 season against at Lambeau Field.

Aranda was replaced with Justin Wilcox, who was previously USC's defensive coordinator from 2014 to 2015, he was fired in early December 2015 after the Trojans finished 50th nationally in scoring defense (25.7 points per game) and 65th in total defense (400.8 yards per game). The Badgers started 2016 on a high note by upsetting the No. 5 ranked LSU Tigers 16–14 in their season opener at Lambeau Field, the first ever major college football game in the historical stadium. The Badgers stayed in the AP top 10 for most of the season, with two losses to Michigan and Ohio State. Wisconsin lost the Big 10 championship game to Penn State, then won the 2017 Cotton Bowl Classic over Western Michigan to finish 11–3, finishing the season ranked 8th in the nation. After the season, Wilcox left to take the head coaching job at Cal.

Wisconsin came into the 2017 season ranked No. 9 in the AP poll and was ranked in the top 10 all season. Undefeated during the regular season, the Badgers were ranked fourth in the nation before narrowly losing the Big 10 championship to Ohio State. Despite failing to reach the College Football Playoff, the Badgers rebounded to win the 2017 Orange Bowl over Miami to finish the season with a 13–1 record, their best record since the 2007 season. Wisconsin was ranked as high as 3rd in the nation in week 14 in the AP poll and Coaches poll and received 10 first-place votes in the AP poll and 21 first-place votes in the Coaches poll. Wisconsin finished the season ranked 6th in the nation.

There were high expectations the next season as Wisconsin came into the 2018 campaign ranked No. 4 in the AP poll. However, injuries and inexperience, alongside poor quarterback play, derailed a promising season as the Badgers finished with a 7-5 regular-season record, including a loss to Minnesota, which resulted in Wisconsin losing Paul Bunyan's Axe for the first time since the 2003 season. The Badgers finished the season with a win in a rematch against Miami in the 2018 Pinstripe Bowl to finish 8–5.

Wisconsin came into the 2019 season ranked No. 19 in the AP Poll and shut out 4 teams en route to a 10-2 finish in the regular season and won the Big Ten West, including games vs ranked Iowa, Michigan and Minnesota and were ranked No. 8 in the AP Poll going in the Big Ten Championship vs No. 1 Ohio State. Despite leading 21–7 at halftime, they ended up losing 34-21 and ended the season with a 28–27 loss vs Oregon in the Rose Bowl. Wisconsin finished the season ranked 10th in the nation.

The 2020 season was shortened and suffered setbacks as a result of the COVID-19 pandemic. The Big Ten, like most conferences, decided to cancel all non-conference games and play a shortened conference-only schedule. The Badgers also suffered from coronavirus-related postponements against Nebraska, Purdue, and Minnesota. As a result, the Nebraska and Purdue games were canceled. Wisconsin struggled to a 4–3 record, losing three games in a row to ranked opponents before finishing the season with a 20–17 overtime victory over Minnesota. The Badgers were invited to the Duke's Mayo Bowl against Wake Forest and won 42–28.

In 2021, the Badgers sought to rebound from their worst season of the Chryst era. However, Wisconsin started out cold, losing three of their first four games. Chryst's squad suffered home losses to Penn State and Michigan along with a road loss to Notre Dame, all ranked opponents. However, the Badgers would recover and win their next seven games including a 27–7 victory over the then-No. 9 Iowa Hawkeyes. The Badgers lost Paul Bunyan's Axe to Minnesota before beating Arizona State in the Las Vegas Bowl 20–13, finishing the season with a 9–4 record and a 6-3 conference record. For the first time in the Chryst era, the Badgers finished consecutive seasons unranked in the AP or CFP polls.

For the 2022 season, Wisconsin started strong with a win over Illinois State in the season opener, but after an upset loss at home to Washington State, followed by blowout losses to Ohio State and Illinois, Paul Chryst was fired on October 2, two days after former Badgers coach Bret Bielema led the Illini to their first win in Madison since 2002. Defensive Coordinator Jim Leonhard became the interim coach and went 4-3 overall to finish the season 6-6, keeping Wisconsin's bowl streak alive. On December 27, Wisconsin beat Oklahoma State 24–17 in the Guaranteed Rate Bowl. It was their 8th bowl win in their last 9 bowl games, and it made Wisconsin finish 7-6, their 22nd straight winning season. It was initially thought that Leonhard would become the permanent replacement for Chryst, but after a loss at home to Minnesota, which was the first time the Badgers had lost consecutive games to their rival since 1993–94, it was decided that former Ohio State coordinator and University of Cincinnati coach Luke Fickell would be the next coach of the program.

=== Luke Fickell Era (2023–present) ===
On November 27, 2022, Luke Fickell was announced as the 31st head football coach for the Wisconsin Badgers.

== Conference affiliations ==
- Independent (1889–1891)
- Intercollegiate Athletic Association of the Northwest (1892–1893)
- Independent (1894–1895)
- Big Ten Conference (1896–present)

== Championships ==
=== National championships ===
Wisconsin has one national championship from an NCAA-designated major selector for the 1942 season. However, the school does not claim this championship.

Season	Selector	Coach	Record	Final AP	Final Coaches
1942	Helms Athletic Foundation	Harry Stuhldreher	8–1–1	No. 3	–

=== Conference championships ===
Wisconsin has won 14 conference championships, eight outright and six shared.

Season	Conference	Coach	Overall record	Conference record
1896	Big Ten Conference	Philip King	7–1–1	2–0–1
1897	Big Ten Conference	Philip King	9–1	3–0
1901†	Big Ten Conference	Philip King	9–0	2–0
1906†	Big Ten Conference	Charles P. Hutchins	5–0	3–0
1912	Big Ten Conference	William Juneau	7–0	5–0
1952†	Big Ten Conference	Ivy Williamson	6–3–1	4–1–1
1959	Big Ten Conference	Milt Bruhn	7–3	5–2
1962	Big Ten Conference	Milt Bruhn	8–2	6–1
1993†	Big Ten Conference	Barry Alvarez	10–1–1	6–1–1
1998†	Big Ten Conference	Barry Alvarez	11–1	7–1
1999	Big Ten Conference	Barry Alvarez	10–2	7–1
2010†	Big Ten Conference	Bret Bielema	11–2	7–1
2011	Big Ten Conference	Bret Bielema	11–3	6–2
2012	Big Ten Conference	Bret Bielema	8–6	4–4

† Co-champions

=== Division championships ===
Wisconsin has won 6 division championships.

Season	Division	Coach	Opponent	CG result
2011†	Big Ten – Leaders	Bret Bielema	Michigan State	W 42–39
2012			Nebraska	W 70- 31
2014	Big Ten – West	Gary Andersen	Ohio State	L 0–59
2016	Big Ten – West	Paul Chryst	Penn State	L 31–38
2017	Big Ten – West	Paul Chryst	Ohio State	L 21–27
2019	Big Ten – West	Paul Chryst	Ohio State	L 21–34

== Bowl games ==
The Badgers have appeared in 35 bowl games and have a record of 19 wins and 16 losses (19-16). Their most recent bowl game was in the 2024 ReliaQuest Bowl. The Badgers have participated in a season-ending bowl game 21 consecutive seasons and snapped a four-game bowl losing streak with a 34–31 overtime victory over Auburn in the 2015 Outback Bowl. They have won eight of the last ten bowl games, with Paul Chryst having won the first four bowls his team participated in and then falling one-point short in the 2020 Rose Bowl. The Badgers have participated in a season-ending bowl game 22 consecutive seasons, the third longest bowl streak in the country only behind Georgia and Oklahoma.

== Head coaches ==
Luke Fickell is now Wisconsin's head coach.

Coach	Years	Seasons	Record	WIn %	Bowl record
Alvin Kletsch	1889	1	0–2	.000	
Ted Mestre	1890	1	1–3	.250	
Herb Alward	1891	1	3–1–1	.700	
Billy Crawford	1892	1	5–2	.714	
Parke H. Davis	1893	1	4–2	.667	
Hiram O. Stickney	1894–1895	2	10–4–1	.700	
Philip King	1896–1902, 1905	7, 1	57–9–1, 8–2	.858, .800	
Arthur Curtis	1903–1904	2	11–6–1	.639	
Charles P. Hutchins	1906–1907	2	8–1–1	.850	
Thomas A. Barry	1908–1910	3	9–4–3	.656	
John R. Richards	1911, 1917, 1919-1922	1, 1, 4	5–1–1, 4–2–1, 20–6–2	.786, .643, .750	
William Juneau	1912–1915	4	18–8–2	.679	
Paul Withington	1916	1	4–2–1	.643	
Guy Lowman	1918	1	3–3	.500	
John J. Ryan	1923–1924	2	5–6–4	.467	
George Little	1925–1926	2	11–3–2	.750	
Glenn Thistlethwaite	1927–1931	5	26–16–3	.611	
Clarence Spears	1932–1935	4	13–17–2	.438	
Harry Stuhldreher	1936–1948	13	45–62–6	.425	
Ivy Williamson	1949–1955	7	41–19–4	.672	0–1
Milt Bruhn	1956–1966	11	52–45–6	.534	0–2
John Coatta	1967–1969	3	3–26–1	.117	
John Jardine	1970–1977	8	37–47–3	.443	
Dave McClain	1978–1985	8	46–42–3	.522	1–2
Jim Hilles (Interim)	1986	1	3–9	.250	
Don Morton	1987–1989	3	6–27	.182	
Barry Alvarez	1990–2005, 2012, 2014	16, .5, .5	118–73–4, 0–1, 1–0	.615, .612, .614	8–3
Bret Bielema	2006–2012	6.5	68–24	.739	2–4
Gary Andersen	2013–2014	1.5	19–7	.731	0–1
Paul Chryst	2015–2022	7.5	67–26	.720	6–1
Jim Leonhard (Interim)	2022	.5	4–3	.571	
Luke Fickell	2023–present	3	15–18	.455	1–1

== Rivalries ==
=== Minnesota ===
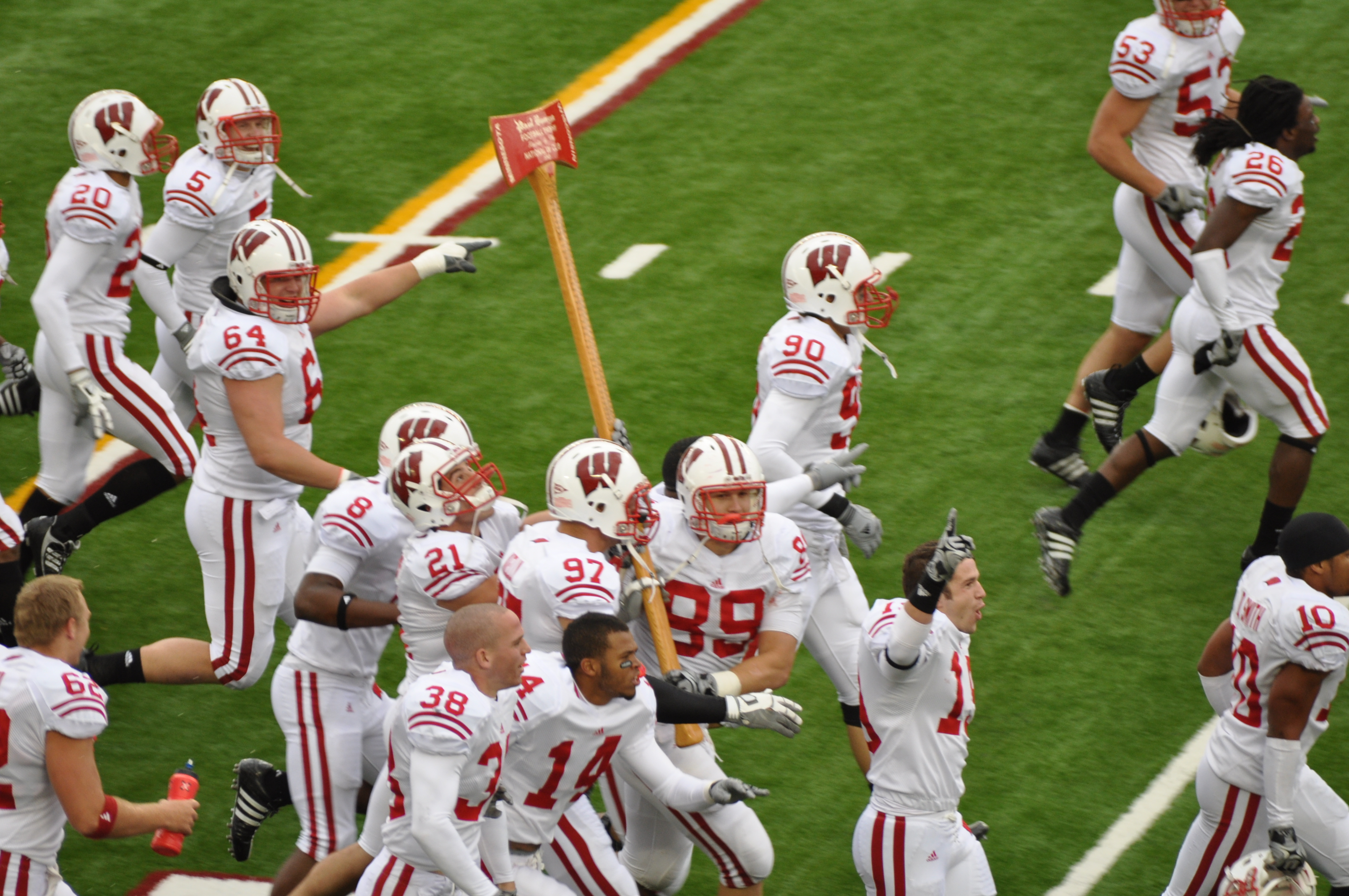
Badgers celebrating their win by carrying Paul Bunyan's Axe around the stadium after the 2009 game.

The UW-U of M series is the nation's most-played rivalry in Division I FBS football and has been played annually since 1907. Much prestige was always associated with the game, and its significance was emphasized with its place on the schedule. Between 1933 and 1982, the Wisconsin-Minnesota game was always the final regular-season contest for each school. The series took an added twist in 1948 when more than state bragging rights were on the line. After a 16-0 setback that season, the Wisconsin lettermen's group, the National 'W' Club, presented Minnesota with an axe wielded by Paul Bunyan. He was the mythical giant of Midwestern lumber camps. Each year since, the winner of the annual battle between the Big Ten rivals is presented with Paul Bunyan's axe, complete with scores inscribed on the handle, for display on its campus. Minnesota leads the series at 64-63-8.

=== Iowa ===
Iowa and Wisconsin first met on the grid iron in 1894. In 2004, the rivalry recognized the Heartland Trophy, which is awarded to each season's winner. The trophy was designed and crafted by artist and former Iowa football player Frank Strub. The trophy, which is a bull mounted on a walnut base (native to both Wisconsin and Iowa), has been inscribed with the scores of all games in the long-time series. With Big Ten expansion, the Wisconsin and Iowa football teams were placed in separate divisions, thus ending their annual rivalry. However, with the addition of Maryland and Rutgers, Iowa and Wisconsin were placed back in the same division in 2014. Wisconsin leads the series at 49-46-2.

=== Nebraska ===
The Nebraska–Wisconsin football rivalry is an American college football rivalry between the Nebraska Cornhuskers and Wisconsin. In 2012, the Badgers defeated Nebraska 70-31 in Indianapolis for the Big Ten Championship. Since 2014, the winner of the game has received the Freedom Trophy. Wisconsin leads the series 13–5.

== All-time records ==
=== All-time Big Ten records ===
This chart includes both the overall record the University of Wisconsin Badgers have with the all-time Big Ten members, as well as the matchups that counted in the Big Ten standings. Wisconsin has been a member of the Big Ten since its creation in 1896. Michigan rejoined the league in 1917 after leaving in 1906. Chicago withdrew after 1939, and then Michigan State (1953), Penn State (1993), and Nebraska (2011), Maryland and Rutgers (2014), Oregon, UCLA, USC and Washington (2024) joined the Big Ten conference bringing the league total to 18 teams. (As of November 25, 2023)

Team	Big Ten wins	Big Ten losses	Big Ten ties	Pct.	Overall wins	Overall losses	Overall ties	Pct.	Streak	First meeting	Last meeting
Chicago Maroons	18	15	5	.539	19	16	5	.538	Won 1	1894	1937
Illinois Fighting Illini	45	38	7	.539	45	38	7	.539	Won 1	1895	2023
Indiana Hoosiers	41	20	2	.667	41	20	2	.667	Lost 2	1907	2023
Iowa Hawkeyes	49	47	2	.510	49	47	2	.510	Lost 3	1894	2024
Maryland Terrapins	4	1	0	.800	4	1	0	.800	Lost 1	2014	2025
Michigan Wolverines	17	52	1	.254	17	52	1	.250	Lost 1	1892	2021
Michigan State Spartans	23	32	0	.408	23	32	0	.418	Lost1	1913	2022
Minnesota Golden Gophers	63	63	8	.500	63	63	8	.500	Lost 1	1890	2024
Nebraska Cornhuskers	11	2	0	.846	13	5	0	.722	Lost 1	1901	2024
Northwestern Wildcats	63	38	5	.618	63	38	5	.618	Won 1	1890	2024
Ohio State Buckeyes	18	63	5	.238	18	63	5	.238	Lost 7	1913	2023
Oregon Ducks	0	1	0	.000	3	4	0	.429	Lost 4	1977	2024
Penn State Nittany Lions	9	12	0	.429	9	12	0	.429	Lost 6	1953	2024
Purdue Boilermakers	54	29	8	.637	54	29	8	.637	Won 18	1892	2024
Rutgers Scarlet Knights	6	0	0	1.000	6	0	0	1.000	Won 6	2014	2024
UCLA Bruins	0	0	0	–	4	7	0	.364	Won 3	1938	2000
USC Trojans	0	1	0	.000	1	7	0	.125	Lost 1	1953	2024
Washington Huskies	0	0	0	–	0	4	0	.000	Lost 4	1960	1992
	406	397	41	.505	430	432	43	.499			

All Data from The Wisconsin Football Fact Book

== Traditions ==
=== The Fifth Quarter ===
The Fifth Quarter is a fan event that originated in 1969 and takes place following every Wisconsin home football game. During a 24-game losing streak (the longest in the school's history), athletic director Elroy Hirsch worked with the University of Wisconsin Marching Band to create "the Fifth Quarter", where the band plays fan favorites such as "On, Wisconsin", "You’ve Said it All", and, at the end of the Fifth Quarter, "Varsity", the school's alma mater.

=== Jump Around ===
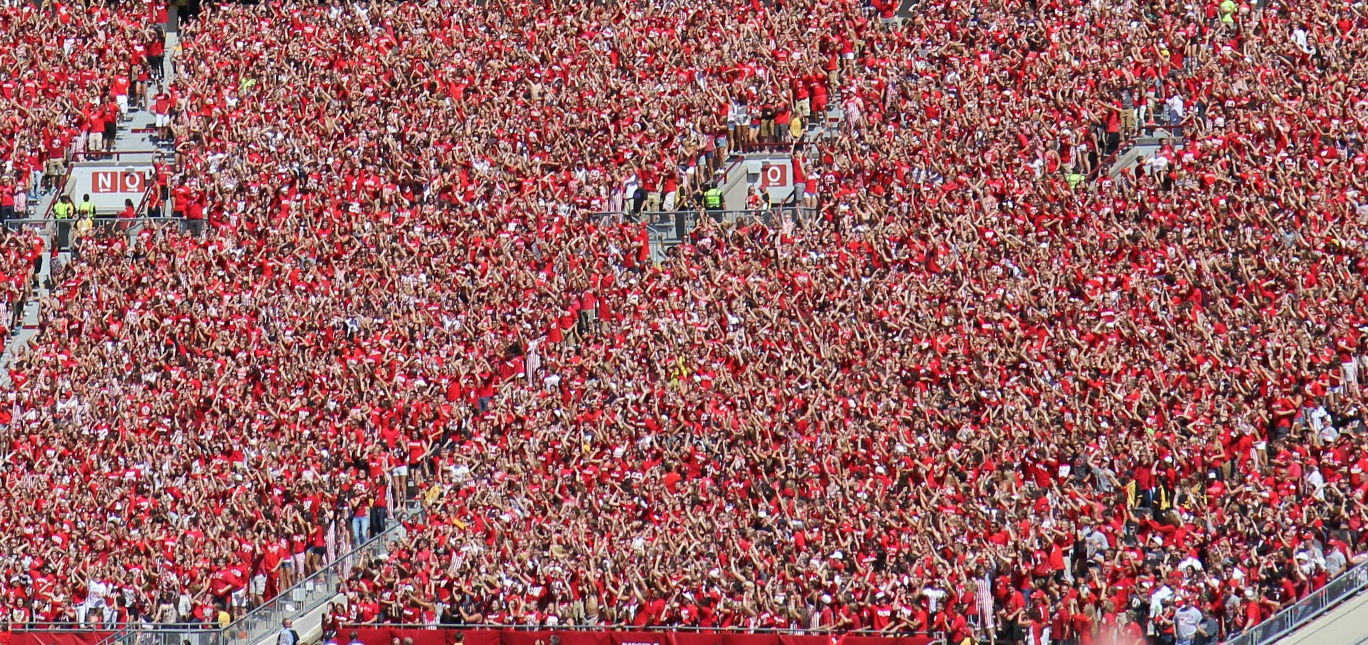
Students in sections O & P jumping around and dancing in 2014

At home football games at the University of Wisconsin–Madison, students and fans "jump around" to the eponymous hit song between the third and fourth quarters. The tradition officially began on October 10, 1998 during a homecoming game against the Purdue Boilermakers. With the Badgers leading by a touchdown en route to their second 6–0 start in the modern football era, the song was piped through the loudspeakers. It stirred up fans and players and eventually became a tradition.

On September 6, 2003, the Badgers' first home game of the season, with the construction of skyboxes surrounding Camp Randall Stadium, UW officials decided to cancel the "Jump Around" due to worries about the stadium's structural integrity. Stadium security and the local police department had been informed of this decision, but no notification had been given to the fans. When news surfaced the following Monday that this event was not a technical or human malfunction, but rather a decision by campus officials, the students launched a protest. Petitions circulated and students pushed back against administration. Structural engineers confirmed that the stadium would suffer no structural damage caused by the vibrations created by jumping. Two days later, Chancellor John D. Wiley announced that the "Jump Around" tradition would resume.

The song's title is displayed on unofficial Wisconsin Badgers clothing and apparel, the university-affiliated UW Credit Union even features the song title on its branded credit and debit cards.

=== College GameDay ===
The Badgers have appeared on ESPN's College Game Day 18 times since 1999, with 3 bowl appearances. Wisconsin is 7–11 in games played when College GameDay has traveled to Badger games. Wisconsin has hosted the program 7 times. The most recent visit came in 2021 when UW played Notre Dame in Chicago. The Badgers have a 4–3 record when GameDay is on the Madison campus.

Date	Location	Home team	Away team	Result
September 25, 1999	Madison, Wisconsin	No. 20 Wisconsin	No. 4 Michigan	L 16–21
September 30, 2000	Ann Arbor, Michigan	No. 9 Michigan	No. 17 Wisconsin	L 10–13
October 18, 2003	Madison, Wisconsin	No. 14 Wisconsin	No. 13 Purdue	L 23–26
September 25, 2004	Madison, Wisconsin	No. 20 Wisconsin	Penn State	W 16–3
October 16, 2004	West Lafayette, Indiana	No. 5 Purdue	No. 10 Wisconsin	W 20–17
October 16, 2010	Madison, Wisconsin	No. 18 Wisconsin	No. 1 Ohio State	W 31–18
January 1, 2011	Pasadena, California (Rose Bowl)	No. 3 TCU	No. 4 Wisconsin	L 19–21
October 1, 2011	Madison, Wisconsin	No. 7 Wisconsin	No. 8 Nebraska	W 48–17
October 22, 2011	East Lansing, Michigan	No. 15 Michigan State	No. 4 Wisconsin	L 31–37
January 2, 2012	Pasadena, California (Rose Bowl)	No. 6 Oregon	No. 9 Wisconsin	L 38–45
January 1, 2013	Pasadena, California (Rose Bowl)	No. 8 Stanford	No. 23 Wisconsin	L 14–20
September 5, 2015	Arlington, Texas (Advocare Classic)	No. 20 Wisconsin	No. 3 Alabama	L 17–35
September 3, 2016	Green Bay, Wisconsin	Wisconsin	No. 5 LSU	W 16–14
October 15, 2016	Madison, Wisconsin	No. 8 Wisconsin	No. 2 Ohio State	L 23–30
December 3, 2016	Indianapolis, Indiana (Big Ten Championship)	No. 8 Penn State	No. 6 Wisconsin	L 31–38
November 18, 2017	Madison, Wisconsin	No. 5 Wisconsin	No. 19 Michigan	W 24–10
October 13, 2018	Ann Arbor, Michigan	No. 12 Michigan	No. 15 Wisconsin	L 13–38
November 30, 2019	Minneapolis, Minnesota	No. 8 Minnesota	No. 12 Wisconsin	W 38–17
September 25, 2021	Chicago, Illinois	No. 12 Notre Dame	No. 18 Wisconsin	L 13–41

== Individual school records ==
Note ‡-indicates NCAA FBS Record, †-indicates Big Ten Conference Record

All Data from The 2019 Wisconsin Football Fact Book

=== Rushing records ===
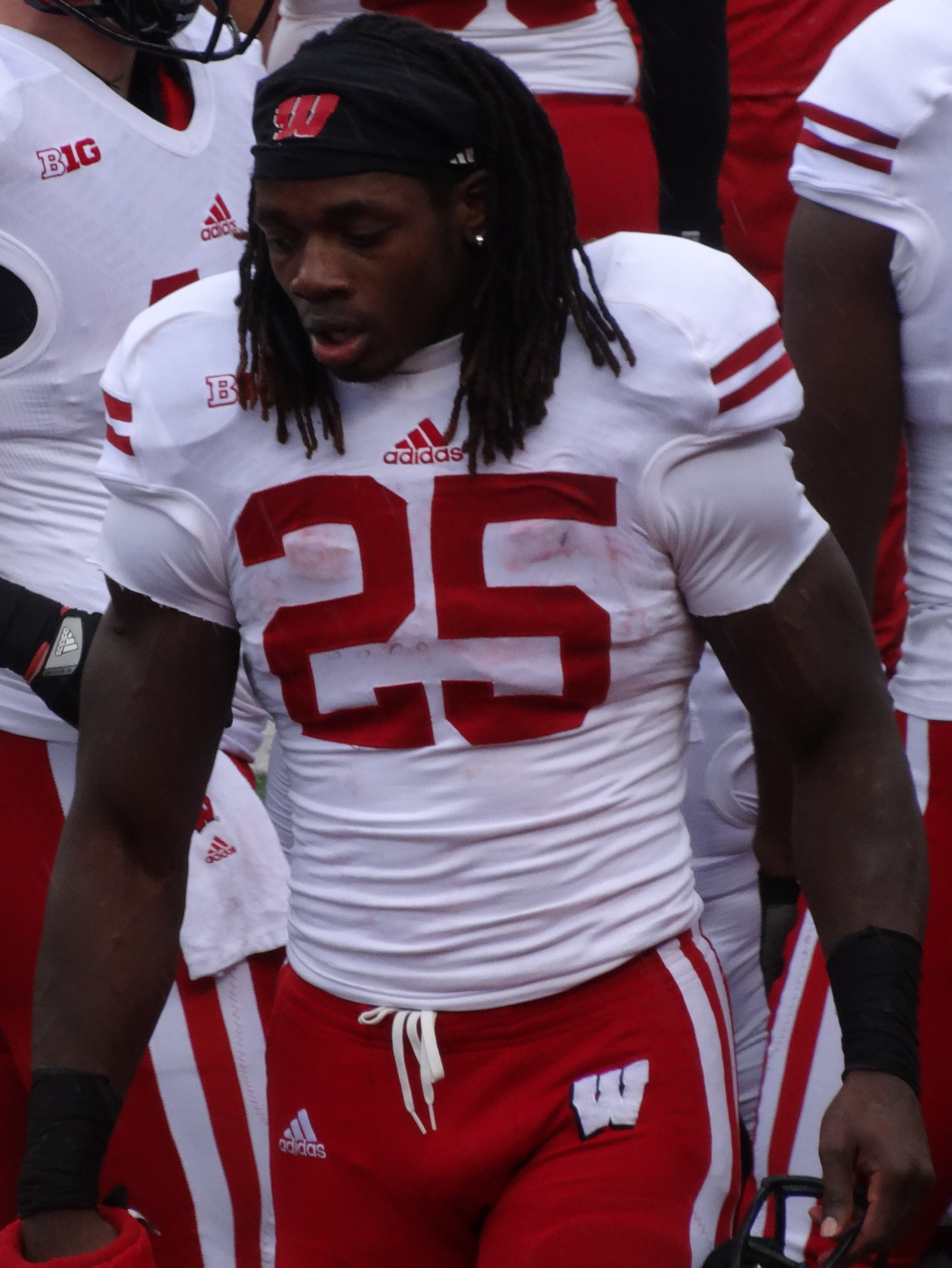
Melvin Gordon in 2014

- Most rushing attempts, career: 1220, Ron Dayne (1996–99)
- Most rushing attempts, season: 356, Montee Ball (2012)
- Most rushing attempts, game: 50, Ron Dayne (November 9, 1996, vs. Minnesota)
- Most rushing yards, career: 7,125, Ron Dayne (1996–99)^{‡†}
- Most rushing yards, season: 2,587, Melvin Gordon (2014)^{†}
- Most rushing yards, game: 408, Melvin Gordon (November 15, 2014, vs. Nebraska)^{†}
- Most rushing yards, single quarter: 189, Melvin Gordon (November 15, 2014, vs. Nebraska)
- Highest average yard per carry, career (min 300 att.): 7.8, Melvin Gordon (2011–14)
- Highest average yard per carry, season (min 100 att.): 7.81, Melvin Gordon (2013)
- Highest average yard per carry, game (min 10 att.): 19.5, Melvin Gordon (September 20, 2014, vs. Bowling Green)
- Most rushing touchdowns, career: 77, Montee Ball (2009-2012)^{†}
- Most rushing touchdowns, season: 33, Montee Ball (2011)^{‡†}
- Most rushing touchdowns, game: 5
  - Billy Marek (November 23, 1974, vs. Minnesota)
  - Anthony Davis (November 23, 2002, vs. Minnesota)
  - Brian Calhoun (September 3, 2005, vs. Bowling Green)
  - Brian Calhoun (October 29, 2005, vs. Illinois)
  - Melvin Gordon (September 20, 2014, vs. Bowling Green)
- Most games with at least 100 rushing yards, career: 33, Ron Dayne (1996–99)
- Most games with at least 100 rushing yards, season: 12, Melvin Gordon (2014)
- Most games with at least 200 rushing yards, career: 12, Jonathan Taylor (2017–19)
- Most games with at least 200 rushing yards, season: 6, Melvin Gordon (2014)

=== Passing records ===
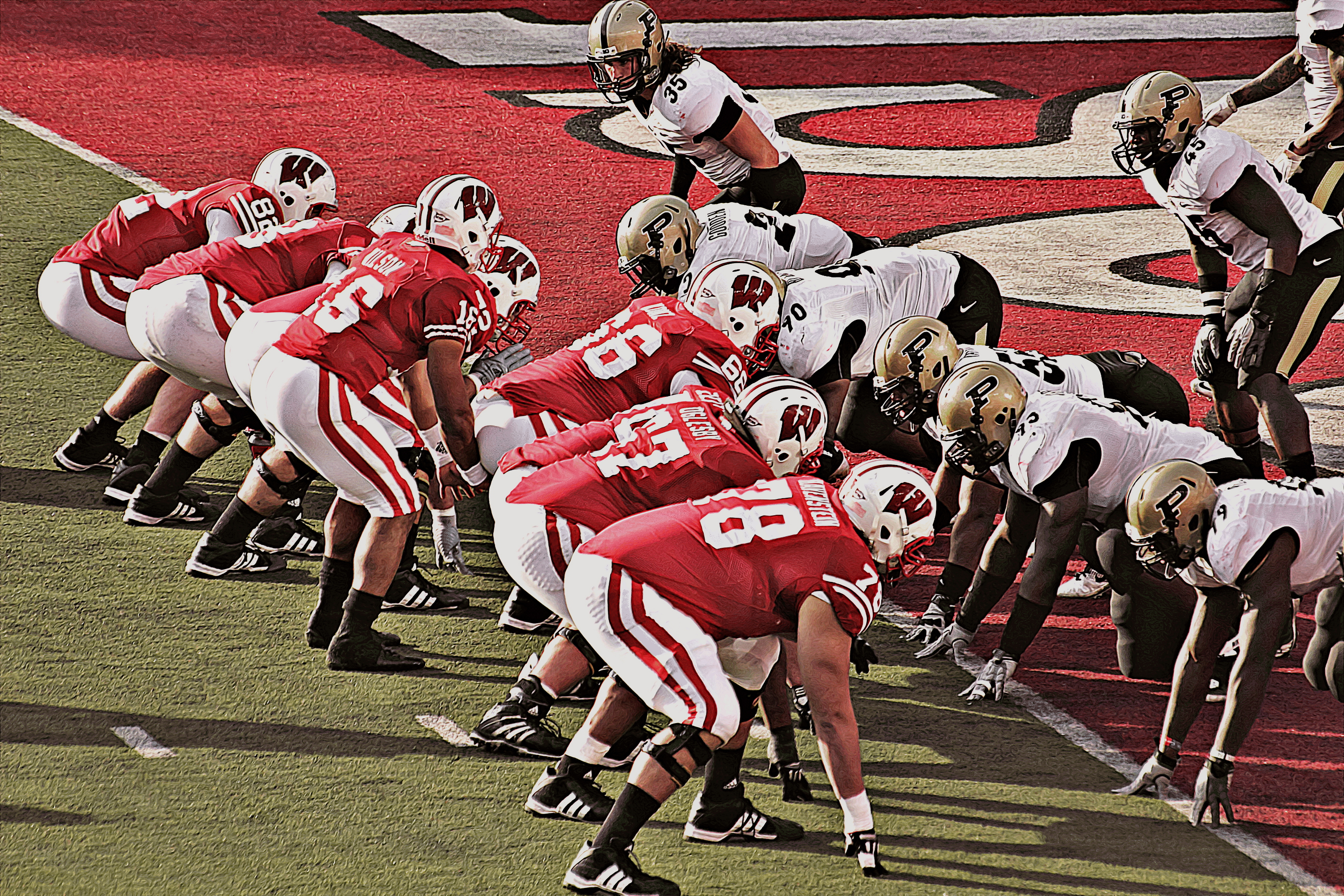
Russell Wilson under center in 2011 against Purdue

- Most passing attempts, career: 1,052, Darrell Bevell (1992–95)
- Most passing attempts, season: 333, Tyler Donovan (2007)
- Most passing attempts, game: 54, Randy Wright (November 5, 1983, vs. Iowa)
- Most passing completions, career: 646, Darrell Bevell (1992–95)
- Most passing completions, season: 225, Russell Wilson (2011)
- Most passing completions, game: 35, Darrell Bevell (November 18, 1995, vs. Iowa)
- Most passing yards, career: 7,686, Darrell Bevell (1992–95)
- Most passing yards, season: 3,175, Russell Wilson (2011)
- Most passing yards, game: 423, Darrell Bevell (October 23, 1993, vs. Minnesota)
- Highest completion percentage, career: 68.1 (410–602), Scott Tolzien (2008–10)
- Highest completion percentage, season: 72.9 (194–266), Scott Tolzien (2010)
- Highest completion percentage, game (min 10 att.): 95.2 (20–21), Graham Mertz (October 23, 2020, vs. Illinois)
- Most passing touchdowns, career: 59, Darrell Bevell (1992–95)
- Most passing touchdowns, season: 33, Russell Wilson (2011)
- Most passing touchdowns, game: 5, Darrell Bevell (September 4, 1993, vs. Nevada), Jim Sorgi (November 15, 2003, vs. Michigan State), and Graham Mertz (October 23, 2020, vs Illinois)
- Highest pass efficiency rating, career: 191.8, Russell Wilson (2011)^{‡†}
- Highest pass efficiency rating, season: 191.8, Russell Wilson (2011)^{‡†}
- Highest pass efficiency rating, game (min 15 att.): 296.68, John Stocco (September 30, 2006, vs. Indiana)
- Most games with at least 200 passing yards, career: 17, John Stocco (2003–06)
- Most games with at least 200 passing yards, season: 8, John Stocco (2005), Russell Wilson (2011)

=== Receiving records ===
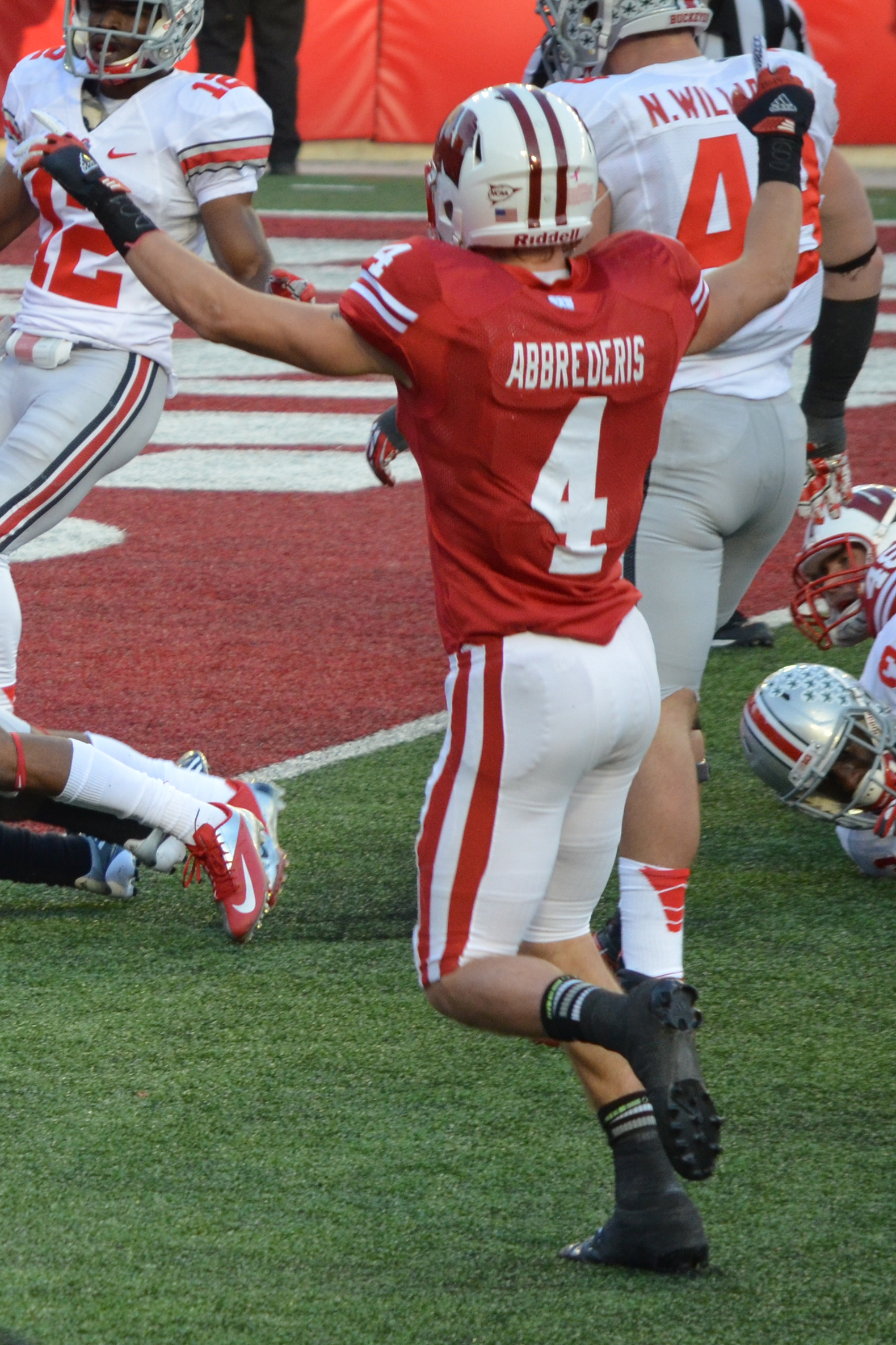
Jared Abbrederis in 2013

- Most receptions, career: 202, Brandon Williams (2002–05) and Jared Abbrederis (2009–13)
- Most receptions, season: 78, Jared Abbrederis (2013)
- Most receptions, game: 13, Matt Nyquist (November 18, 1995, vs. Iowa)
- Most receiving yards, career: 3,468, Lee Evans (1999–2003)
- Most receiving yards, season: 1,545, Lee Evans (2001)
- Most receiving yards, game: 258, Lee Evans (November 15, 2003, vs. Michigan State)
- Highest average yards per reception, career (min 50 rec.): 20.1, Tony Simmons (1994–97)
- Highest average yards per reception, season (min 30 rec.): 21.3, Larry Mialik (1970)
- Highest average yards per reception, game (min 3 rec.): 47.3, Larry Mialik (October 3, 1970, vs. Penn State Nittany Lions)
- Most touchdown receptions, career: 27, Lee Evans (1999–2003)
- Most touchdown receptions, season: 13, Lee Evans (2003)
- Most touchdown receptions, game: 5, Lee Evans (November 15, 2003, vs. Michigan State Spartans)
- Most consecutive games with a reception, career: 38, Lee Evans (1999–2003)

=== Scoring records ===
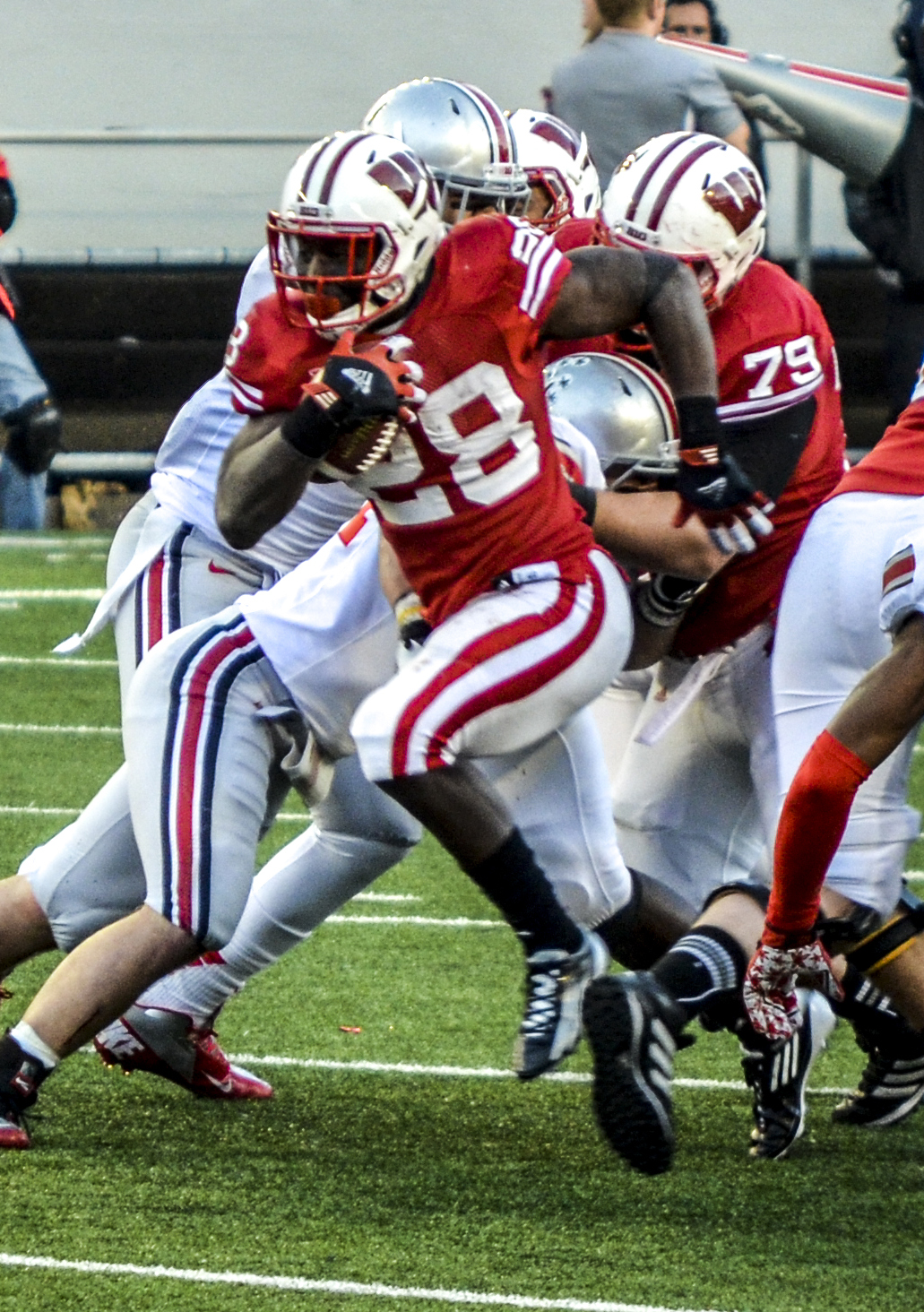
Montee Ball in 2012

- Most points scored, career: 500, Montee Ball (2009–2012)^{‡†}
- Most points scored, season: 236, Montee Ball (2011)^{‡†}
- Most points scored, game: 30
  - Billy Marek (November 23, 1974, vs. Minnesota)
  - Anthony Davis (November 23, 2002, vs. Minnesota)
  - Lee Evans (November 15, 2003, vs. Michigan State)
  - Brian Calhoun (September 3, 2005, vs. Bowling Green and October 29, 2005, vs. Illinois)
  - P.J. Hill (September 15, 2007, vs. The Citadel)
  - Melvin Gordon (September 20, 2014, vs. Bowling Green)
- Most touchdowns scored, career: 83, Montee Ball (2009–2012)^{‡†}
- Most touchdowns scored, season: 39, Montee Ball (2011)^{‡†}
- Most touchdowns scored, game: 5
  - Billy Marek (November 23, 1974, vs. Minnesota)
  - Anthony Davis (November 23, 2002, vs. Minnesota)
  - Lee Evans (November 15, 2003, vs. Michigan State)
  - Brian Calhoun (September 3, 2005, vs. Bowling Green and October 29, 2005, vs. Illinois)
  - P.J. Hill (September 15, 2007, vs. The Citadel)
  - Melvin Gordon (September 20, 2014, vs. Bowling Green)
- Most extra points, career: 202, Philip Welch (2008–11)
- Most extra points, season: 67, Philip Welch (2010)
- Most extra points, game: 11, Philip Welch (November 13, 2010, vs. Indiana)
- Most field goals made, career: 65, Todd Gregoire (1984–87)
- Most field goals made, season: 22, Rich Thompson (1992)
- Most field goals made, game: 4
  - Vince Lamia (November 20, 1976, vs. Minnesota)
  - Todd Gregoire (December 29, 1984, vs. Kentucky and November 7, 1987, vs. Ohio State)
  - Rich Thompson (September 19, 1992, vs. Bowling Green and October 17, 1992, vs. Purdue)
  - Matt Davenport (November 7, 1998, vs. Minnesota)
  - Vitaly Pisetsky (October 23, 1999, vs. Michigan State)
  - Philip Welch (September 27, 2008, vs. Michigan)

=== Kickoff/Punt return records ===
- Most kickoff return yards, career: 3,025, David Gilreath (2007–10)
- Most kickoff return yards, season: 967, David Gilreath (2007)
- Most kickoff return yards, game: 201, Jared Abbrederis (January 2, 2012, vs. Oregon)
- Most kickoff return touchdowns, career: 2, Danny Crooks (1969–71), Ira Matthews (1975–78), and Nick Davis (1998–2001)
- Most kickoff return touchdowns, season: 2, Ira Matthews (1976) and Nick Davis (1999)
- Most kickoff return touchdowns, game: 1, (multiple players), most recent - Aron Cruickshank (January 1, 2020, vs. (Oregon)
- Highest average per kickoff return, career (min 30 ret.): 25.8, Jared Abbrederis (2010–13)
- Highest average per kickoff return, season (min 10 ret.): 29.6, Ira Matthews (1976)
- Highest average per kickoff return, game (min 3 ret.): 42.7, Selvie Washington (September 21, 1974, vs. Nebraska)
- Most punt return yards, career: 1,347, Jim Leonhard (2001–04)
- Most punt return yards, season: 470, Jim Leonhard (2003)
- Most punt return yards, game: 158, Earl Girard (November 8, 1947, vs. Iowa)
- Most punt return touchdowns, career: 4, Ira Matthews (1975–78)
- Most punt return touchdowns, season: 3, Ira Matthews (1978)
- Most punt return touchdowns, game: 2, Earl Girard (November 8, 1947, vs. Iowa)
- Highest average per punt return, career (min 25 ret.): 13.7, Brandon Williams (2002–05)
- Highest average per punt return, season (min 15 ret.): 16.9, Ira Matthews (1978)
- Highest average per punt return, game (min 3 ret.): 52.7, Earl Girard (November 8, 1947, vs. Iowa)

=== Defensive records ===
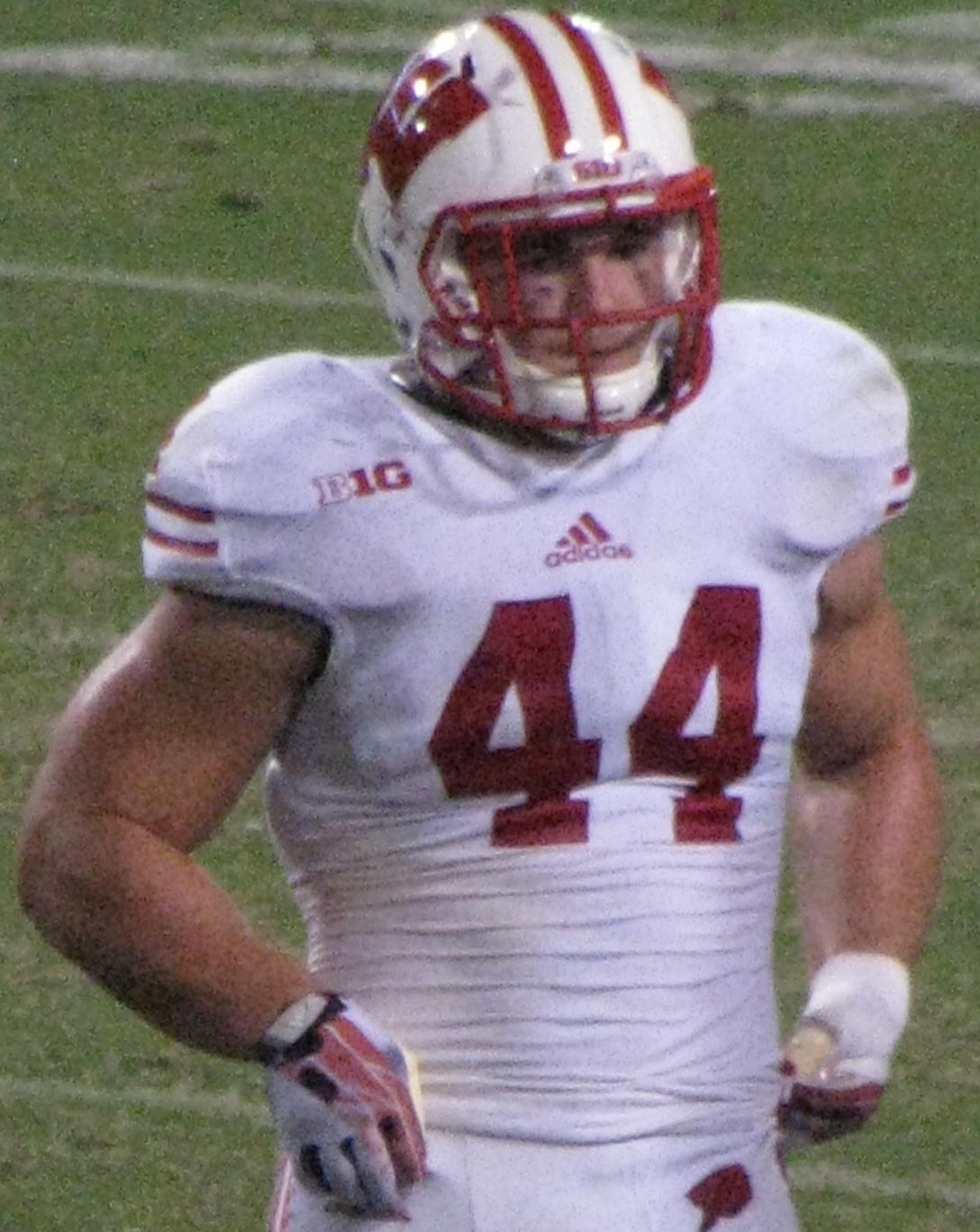
Chris Borland in 2013

- Most interceptions, career: 21, Jamar Fletcher (1998–2000) and Jim Leonhard (2001–04)
- Most interceptions, season: 11, Jim Leonhard (2002)
- Most interceptions, game: 4, Clarence Bratt (November 20, 1964, vs. Minnesota)
- Most interceptions returned for a touchdown, career: 5, Jamar Fletcher (1998–2000)
- Most interceptions returned for a touchdown, season: 3, Jamar Fletcher (1998)
- Most interceptions returned for a touchdown, game: 2, Bob Radcliffe (October 15, 1949, vs. Navy)
- Most tackles, career: 451, Pete Monty (1993–96)
- Most tackles, season: 181, Dave Lokanc (1972)
- Most tackles, game: 28, Dave Crossen (November 5, 1977, vs. Purdue)
- Most tackles for loss, career: 58, Tarek Saleh (1993–96)
- Most tackles for loss, season: 31, Tom Burke (1998)
- Most tackles for loss, game: 6.5, Alex Lewis (October 18, 2003, vs. Purdue)
- Most quarterback sacks, career: 33, Tarek Saleh (1993–96)
- Most quarterback sacks, season: 22, Tom Burke (1998)
- Most quarterback sacks, game: 6, Tim Jordan (October 19, 1985, vs. Northwestern)
- Most fumbles forced, career: 14, Chris Borland (2009–13)^{‡†}
- Most fumbles recovered, career: 9, Scott Erdmann (1975–78)
- Most fumbles recovered, season: 5, Ed Bosold (1972)
- Most fumbles recovered, game: 3, Michael Reid (November 16, 1985, vs. Ohio State)
- Most passes defended, career: 62, Mike Echols (1998–2001)
- Most passes defended, season: 25, Mike Echols (2000) and Jim Leonhard (2002)
- Most passes defended, game: 6, Mike Echols (November 6, 1999, vs. Purdue)
- Most blocked kicks, career: 8, Richard Johnson (1982–84)
- Most blocked kicks, season: 6, Richard Johnson (1984)
- Most blocked kicks, game: 3, Richard Johnson (September 15, 1984, vs. Missouri)

Note ‡-indicates NCAA FBS Record, †-indicates Big Ten Conference Record

== Honors ==
=== Retired numbers ===
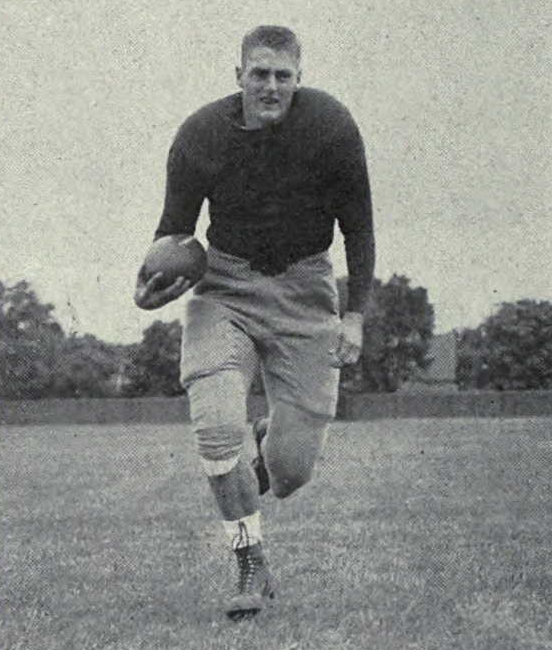
Elroy Hirsch, one of the Badgers to have his number retired

Wisconsin Badgers retired numbers
No.	Player	Pos.	Tenure
33	Ron Dayne	RB	1996–1999
35	Alan Ameche	FB	1951–1954
40	Elroy Hirsch	HB	1941–1942
80	Dave Schreiner	E	1939–1942
83	Allan Shafer (Note: Posthumously. Shafer played only six games in 1944 before his death from injuries received in a game on November 11. He was 17 years old.)	QB	1944
88	Pat Richter	E/P	1960–1962

== Hall of Fame ==
=== College Football Hall of Fame ===
Beginning with George Little and Dave Schreiner in the 1955 class, the Badgers have had 16 former players and coaches inducted into the College Football Hall of Fame

- 1955 George Little & Dave Schreiner
- 1962 Phillip King & Pat O'Dea
- 1972 Bob Butler
- 1974 Elroy Hirsch
- 1975 Alan Ameche
- 1988 Marty Below
- 1993 Pat Harder
- 1996 Pat Richter
- 2010 Barry Alvarez
- 2013 Ron Dayne
- 2016 Tim Krumrie
- 2019 Joe Thomas
- 2023 Troy Vincent
- 2025 Montee Ball

=== Pro Football Hall of Fame ===
Wisconsin has had 4 former players, graduates enshrined into the Pro Football Hall of Fame.

- 1966 Arnie Herber
- 1968 Elroy Hirsch
- 1997 Mike Webster
- 2023 Joe Thomas

== Individual award winners and finalists ==
The following players have been nominated for national awards. Players highlighted in yellow indicate winners:

Heisman Trophy
Year	Athlete	Place
1938	Howard Weiss	6th
1942	Dave Schreiner	10th
1953	Alan Ameche	6th
1954	Alan Ameche	Winner
1959	Dale Hackbart	7th
1962	Pat Richter	6th
1962	Ron Vander Kelen	9th
1999	Ron Dayne	Winner
2011	Montee Ball	4th
2011	Russell Wilson	9th
2014	Melvin Gordon	2nd
2017	Jonathan Taylor	6th
2018	Jonathan Taylor	9th
2019	Jonathan Taylor	5th

Maxwell Award
Year	Athlete	Place
1999	Ron Dayne	Winner
2011	Russell Wilson	Semi-finalist
2012	Montee Ball	Semi-finalist
2013	Melvin Gordon	Semi-finalist
2014	Melvin Gordon	Finalist
2017	Jonathan Taylor	Semi-finalist
2018	Jonathan Taylor	Semi-finalist
2019	Jonathan Taylor	Semi-finalist

Walter Camp Award
Year	Athlete	Place
1953	Alan Ameche	Winner
1999	Ron Dayne	Winner
2012	Montee Ball	Semi-finalist
2017	Jonathan Taylor	Semi-finalist
2018	Jonathan Taylor	Semi-finalist
2019	Jonathan Taylor	Finalist

AP Player of the Year
Year	Athlete	Place
1999	Ron Dayne	Winner

Doak Walker Award
Year	Athlete	Place
1998	Ron Dayne	Finalist
1999	Ron Dayne	Winner
2001	Anthony Davis	Semi-finalist
2005	Brian Calhoun	Semi-finalist
2006	P. J. Hill	Semi-finalist
2010	John Clay	Finalist
2011	Montee Ball	Finalist
2012	Montee Ball	Winner
2013	Melvin Gordon	Semi-finalist
2014	Melvin Gordon	Winner
2017	Jonathan Taylor	Finalist
2018	Jonathan Taylor	Winner
2019	Jonathan Taylor	Winner

Davey O'Brien Award
Year	Athlete	Place
2006	John Stocco	Semi-finalist
2011	Russell Wilson	Semi-finalist

Dave Rimington Trophy
Year	Athlete	Place
2002	Al Johnson	Finalist
2011	Peter Konz	Finalist
2019	Tyler Biadasz	Winner

Outland Trophy
Year	Athlete	Place
1998	Aaron Gibson	Finalist
1999	Chris McIntosh	Finalist
2006	Joe Thomas	Winner
2010	Gabe Carimi	Winner
2018	Michael Deiter	Semi-finalist
2019	Tyler Biadasz	Finalist

Lombardi Award
Year	Athlete	Place
1998	Aaron Gibson	Finalist
2000	Wendell Bryant	Semi-finalist
2001	Wendell Bryant	Semi-finalist
2004	Erasmus James	Finalist
2005	Joe Thomas	Semi-finalist
2006	Joe Thomas	Semi-finalist
2012	Chris Borland	Semi-finalist
2015	Joe Schobert	Semi-finalist
2019	Jonathan Taylor	Semi-finalist

Wuerffel Trophy
Year	Athlete	Place
2006	Joe Thomas	Finalist

William V. Campbell Trophy
Year	Athlete	Place
2004	Jim Leonhard	Finalist
2006	Joe Thomas	Finalist
2018	D'Cota Dixon	Finalist

Paul "Bear" Bryant Award
Year	Coach	Place
2006	Bret Bielema	Finalist
2010	Bret Bielema	Semi-finalist
2011	Bret Bielema	Finalist
2016	Paul Chryst	Finalist

Chuck Bednarik Award
Year	Athlete	Place
2004	Erasmus James	Finalist
2009	O'Brien Schofield	Semi-finalist
2010	J. J. Watt	Semi-finalist
2013	Chris Borland	Semi-finalist
2015	Joe Schobert	Semi-finalist
2019	Zack Baun	Semi-finalist
2021	Leo Chenal	Semi-finalist
2026	Mason Posa	Semi-finalist
2026	Cooper Catalano	Semi-finalist

Dick Butkus Award
Year	Athlete	Place
2013	Chris Borland	Semi-finalist
2017	T. J. Edwards	Finalist
2019	Zack Baun	Semi-finalist
2021	Leo Chenal	Finalist

Bronko Nagurski Trophy
Year	Athlete	Place
2004	Erasmus James	Finalist

Ted Hendricks Award
Year	Athlete	Place
2004	Erasmus James	Finalist
2010	J. J. Watt	Finalist

Fred Biletnikoff Award
Year	Athlete	Place
2001	Lee Evans	Finalist

Ray Guy Award
Year	Athlete	Place
2000	Kevin Stemke	Winner

Lou Groza Award
Year	Athlete	Place
1998	Matt Davenport	Semi-finalist
1999	Vitaly Pisetsky	Finalist
2006	Taylor Mehlhaff	Semi-finalist
2007	Taylor Mehlhaff	Finalist
2008	Philip Welch	Semi-finalist
2023	Nathanial Vakos	Semi-finalist

Jim Thorpe Award
Year	Athlete	Place
1991	Troy Vincent	Semi-finalist
2000	Jamar Fletcher	Winner
2004	Jim Leonhard	Semi-finalist

Mosi Tatupu Award
Year	Athlete	Place
1999	Nick Davis	Semi-finalist
1999	Vitaly Pisetsky	Finalist
2001	Nick Davis	Finalist

Ronnie Lott Award
Year	Athlete	Place
2004	Jim Leonhard	Finalist
2010	J. J. Watt	Winner
2013	Chris Borland	Finalist
2015	Joe Schobert	Semi-finalist
2019	Chris Orr	Semi-finalist

John Mackey Award
Year	Athlete	Place
2006	Travis Beckum	Semi-finalist
2007	Travis Beckum	Finalist
2010	Lance Kendricks	Finalist
2017	Troy Fumagalli	Finalist

Johnny Unitas Golden Arm Award
Year	Athlete	Place
2010	Scott Tolzien	Winner
2011	Russell Wilson	Finalist

George Munger Award
Year	Coach	Place
2010	Bret Bielema	Semi-finalist
2017	Paul Chryst	Semi-finalist

Frank Broyles Award
Year	Coach	Place
2010	Paul Chryst	Finalist
2017	Jim Leonhard	Finalist
2021	Jim Leonhard	Semi-finalist

Burlsworth Trophy
Year	Athlete	Place
2012	Jared Abbrederis	Semi-finalist
2013	Jared Abbrederis	Winner
2017	Troy Fumagalli	Finalist
2018	Ryan Connelly	Semi-finalist
2021	Matt Henningsen	Semi-finalist

=== Consensus All-Americans ===
List of Consensus All-Americans showing the year won, player and position (Note: Statistics correct as of 2019 NCAA Division I FBS football season.)

^{†}	Unanimous selection

Year	Player name	Position
1912	Robert Butler	T
1913	Ray Keeler	G
1915	Howard Buck	T
1919	Charles Carpenter	C
1920	Ralph Scott	T
1923	Marty Below	T
1930	Milo Lubratovich	T
1942	Dave Schreiner†	E
1954	Alan Ameche†	B
1959	Dan Lanphear†	T
1962	Pat Richter	E
1975	Dennis Lick	T
1981	Tim Krumrie	DL
1994	Cory Raymer	C
1998	Aaron Gibson	OL
1998	Tom Burke†	DL
1999	Chris McIntosh†	OT
1999	Ron Dayne†	RB

Year	Player name	Position
2000	Jamar Fletcher	CB
2004	Erasmus James	DE
2006	Joe Thomas†	OT
2010	Lance Kendricks	TE
2010	Gabe Carimi†	OT
2011	Montee Ball	RB
2011	Kevin Zeitler	G
2012	Montee Ball	RB
2014	Melvin Gordon†	RB
2016	Ryan Ramczyk	LT
2018	Beau Benzschawel	RG
2018	Jonathan Taylor†	RB
2019	Jonathan Taylor†	RB
2019	Tyler Biadasz†	C

== Future opponents ==
=== Future Big Ten opponents ===
Year	Illinois	Indiana	Iowa	Maryland	Michigan	Michigan State	Minnesota	Nebraska	Northwestern	Ohio State	Oregon	Penn State	Purdue	Rutgers	UCLA	USC	Washington
2026			Away	Away		Home	Home					Away	Away	Home	Away	Home	
2027	Away		Home			Away	Away	Home	Home			Home			Home	Away	
2028		Home	Away		Home		Home	Away	Away	Away	Home						Away

=== Non-conference opponents ===
Announced schedules as of October 1, 2026.

On August 12, 2020, it was announced that Wisconsin would play versus the Southern Illinois Salukis in 2027, a game rescheduled from 2020 due to the COVID-19 pandemic.

On January 8, 2021, it was announced that Wisconsin would play versus the Colorado State Rams in 2026. On May 4, 2021, it was announced that the game would be moved to 2027. On October 1, 2026, it was announced that the game was canceled and was replaced with a game against UMass Minutemen.

On May 3, 2021, it was announced that Wisconsin would play a home and home series versus the Utah Utes in 2028 and 2033.

On June 7, 2021, it was announced that Wisconsin would play versus the Notre Dame Fighting Irish in 2026 at Lambeau Field, a game rescheduled from 2020 due to the COVID-19 pandemic.

On November 21, 2023, it was announced that Wisconsin would play versus the Pittsburgh Panthers in 2027 at Aviva Stadium in Ireland as part of the Aer Lingus College Football Classic.

On March 26, 2024, it was announced that Wisconsin would play a home-and-home series versus the California Golden Bears in 2029 and 2030.

On September 17, 2025, it was announced that Wisconsin would play in the Duke's Mayo Classic versus the Virginia Tech Hokies in 2031 at Bank of America Stadium in Charlotte, North Carolina.

On May 11, 2026, it was announced that Wisconsin would host the Northern Iowa Panthers in 2030 – their first meeting since 2012.

2026	2027	2028	2029	2030	2031	2032	2033
vs Notre Dame (9/6)	vs Pittsburgh (8/28)	Marshall (9/2)	Illinois State (8/25)	California (8/31)	vs Virginia Tech (8/30)	Virginia Tech (9/18)	at Utah (9/10)
Western Illinois (9/12)	Southern Illinois (9/11)	William & Mary (9/9)	at California (9/1)	Missouri State (9/14)			
Eastern Michigan (9/19)	UMass (9/18)	Utah (9/16)	Akron (9/22)	Northern Iowa (TBA)			

██ P5 opponents and equivalents

== Current professional football players ==
=== National Football League ===
= Pro Bowler

Name	Position	Current team	Draft year
Braelon Allen	RB	New York Jets	2024
Vinny Anthony	WR	Atlanta Falcons	undrafted in 2026
Zack Baun	LB	Philadelphia Eagles	2020
Ben Barten	DT	New York Giants	undrafted in 2026
Keeanu Benton	DT	Pittsburgh Steelers	2023
Tyler Biadasz	C	Los Angeles Chargers	2020
Tanor Bortolini	C	Indianapolis Colts	2024
Peter Bowden	LS	Los Angeles Chargers	undrafted in 2024
Quintez Cephus	WR	Free agent	2020
Leo Chenal	LB	Washington Commanders	2022
Michael Deiter	G	Denver Broncos	2019
David Edwards	OT	New Orleans Saints	2019
T. J. Edwards	LB	Chicago Bears	undrafted in 2019
Jake Ferguson	TE	Dallas Cowboys	2022
Nyzier Fourqurean	CB	Los Angeles Rams	undrafted in 2026
Matt Henningsen	DE	Denver Broncos	2022
Nick Herbig	LB	Pittsburgh Steelers	2023
Alec Ingold	FB	Los Angeles Chargers	undrafted in 2019
Isaiahh Loudermilk	DT	Free agent	2021
Riley Mahlman	OT	Atlanta Falcons	undrafted in 2026
Jack Nelson	OT	Minnesota Vikings	2025
Maema Njongmeta	LB	Free agent	undrafted in 2024
Dare Ogunbowale	RB	Las Vegas Raiders	undrafted in 2017
Parker Petersen	DT	Carolina Panthers	undrafted in 2026
Darryl Peterson III	LB	Los Angeles Rams	undrafted in 2026
Kendric Pryor	WR	Free agent	undrafted in 2022
Mason Reiger	LB	Philadelphia Eagles	undrafted in 2026
Hayden Rucci	TE	Jacksonville Jaguars	undrafted in 2024
Jack Sanborn	LB	Chicago Bears	undrafted in 2022
Jay'viar Suggs	DT	New Orleans Saints	undrafted in 2026
Jonathan Taylor	RB	Indianapolis Colts	2020
Joe Tippmann	C	New York Jets	2023
Andrew Van Ginkel	LB	Minnesota Vikings	2019
Cole Van Lanen	OT	Jacksonville Jaguars	2021
T. J. Watt	LB	Pittsburgh Steelers	2017
Russell Wilson	QB	Free agent	2012
Hunter Wohler	S	Indianapolis Colts	2025
Kevin Zeitler	G	Green Bay Packers	2012

=== UFL ===
- Olive Sagapolu - Columbus Aviators

=== CFL ===
- Faion Hicks - Montreal Alouettes
- Elijah Hills - Calgary Stampeders
