= Donnel Thompson =

American football player (born 1978)

No. 90, 54
- Position: Linebacker

Personal information
- Born: February 17, 1978 (age 48); Madison, Wisconsin, U.S.
- Listed height: 6 ft 0 in (1.83 m)
- Listed weight: 234 lb (106 kg)

Career information
- High school: Madison West
- College: Wisconsin
- NFL draft: 2000: undrafted

Career history
- Pittsburgh Steelers (2000); Indianapolis Colts (2001–2003)

Career NFL statistics
- Games played: 28
- Tackles: 25
- Fumble recoveries: 1
- Stats at Pro Football Reference

Donnel A. Thompson (born February 17, 1978) is an American former professional football player who was a linebacker in the National Football League (NFL). He played for the Pittsburgh Steelers (2000) and the Indianapolis Colts (2001–2003). He played college football for the Wisconsin Badgers.

== See also ==
- List of Pittsburgh Steelers players
