= Chris McIntosh =

American football player and administrator (born 1977)

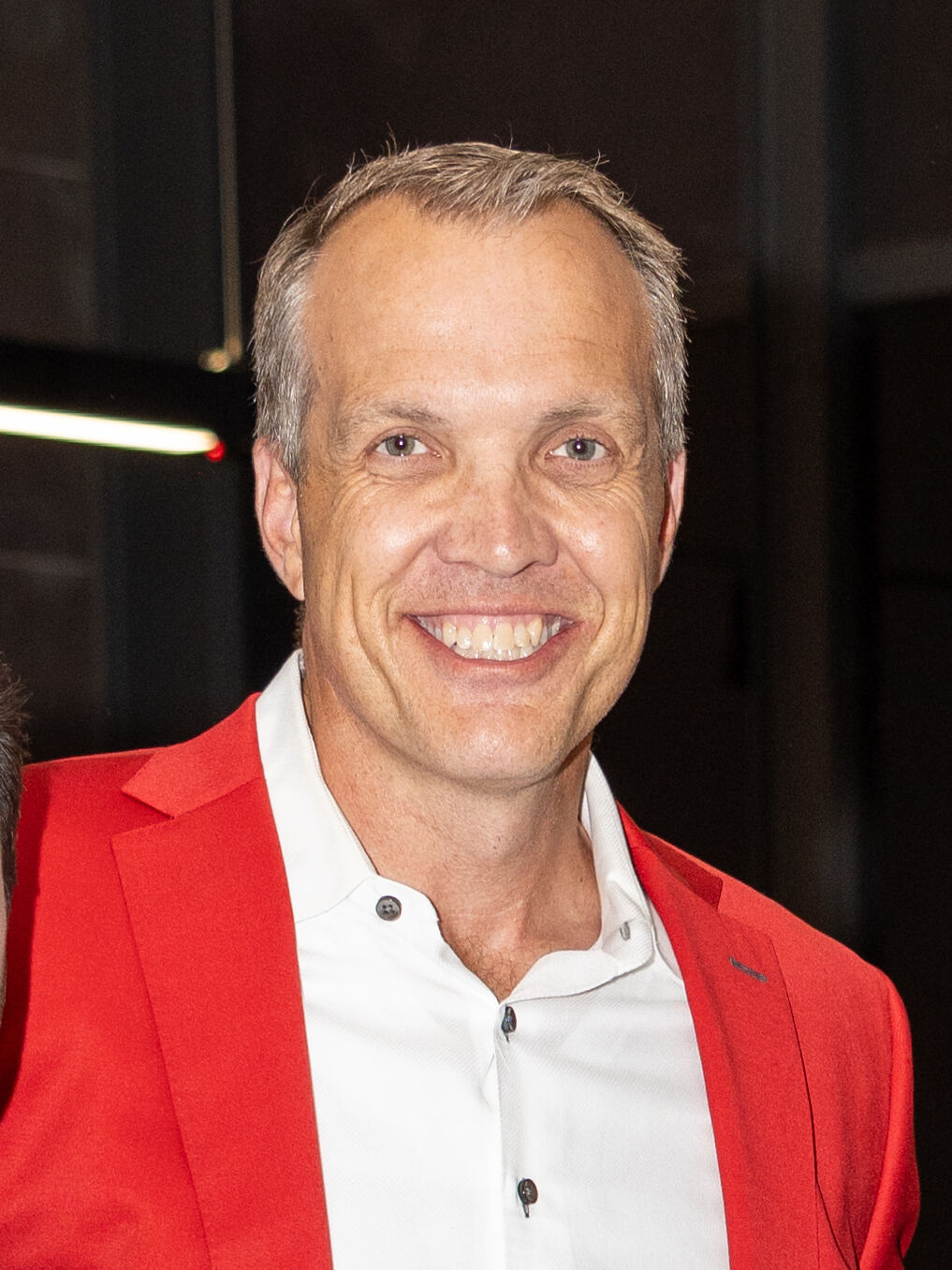
- McIntosh in 2024

Current position
- Title: Deputy Commissioner for Strategy
- Conference: Big Ten

Biographical details
- Born: February 20, 1977 (age 49); Pewaukee, Wisconsin, U.S.
- Education: University of Wisconsin–Madison

Playing career
- 1996–1999: Wisconsin
- 2000–2002: Seattle Seahawks
- Position: Offensive tackle

Administrative career (AD unless noted)
- 2014–2016: Wisconsin (Director of business development)
- 2016–2017: Wisconsin (Associate athletic director for business development)
- 2017–2021: Wisconsin (Deputy AD)
- 2021–2026: Wisconsin
- 2026–present: Big Ten (Deputy Commissioner for Strategy)

Accomplishments and honors

Awards
- As a player: Jim Parker Trophy (1999); Unanimous All-American (1999); Big Ten Offensive Lineman of the Year (1999); First-team All-Big Ten (1999); Second-team All-Big Ten (1998)

Chris McIntosh (born February 20, 1977) is an American college athletics administrator, businessman, and former football player who is the Deputy Commissioner for Strategy for the Big Ten Conference and was most recently the athletic director at the University of Wisconsin–Madison. He played professionally as a tackle for the Seattle Seahawks of the National Football League (NFL).

McIntosh played college football as an offensive tackle for the Wisconsin Badgers, earning a consensus unanimous All-American selection, Big Ten Offensive Lineman of the Year and a 2000 Rose Bowl victory. McIntosh was selected by the Seahawks in the first round of the 2000 NFL draft. He played for parts of three seasons but suffered a neck injury in 2001 which derailed his career and led him to retire from football before the start of the 2003 season. Upon his retirement from the NFL, McIntosh pursued various unsuccessful business ventures in the private sector before returning to the University of Wisconsin–Madison, where he quickly rose to deputy athletic director before being selected to succeed longtime athletic director and former head football coach Barry Alvarez upon Alvarez's retirement. McIntosh departed that role on April 13, 2026, to become the Deputy Commissioner for Strategy for the Big Ten Conference.

== Early life ==
McIntosh was born and raised in Pewaukee, Wisconsin. He attended Pewaukee High School and played for the Pewaukee Pirates high school football team.

== College career ==
McIntosh attended the University of Wisconsin on a full football scholarship and was a standout tackle for the Wisconsin Badgers football team from 1996 to 1999. As a senior and team captain in 1999, he was selected as first-team All-Big Ten, won the Big Ten Offensive Lineman of the Year award, and was a consensus first-team All-American. McIntosh was a key member of the Badgers' back-to-back Rose Bowl winning teams in 1999 and 2000 and was inducted in the UW Athletic Hall of Fame in 2014.

== Professional career ==
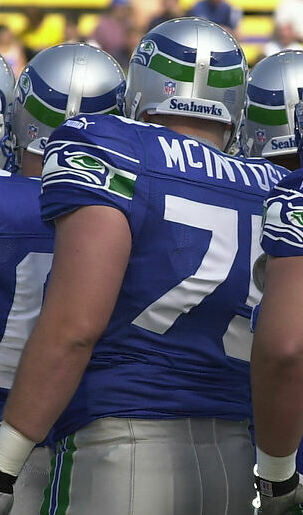
McIntosh with the Seattle Seahawks in 2000

McIntosh was selected along with Shaun Alexander by the Seahawks in the first round of the 2000 NFL Draft. As the 22nd overall pick, he was met with high expectations and seen as a potential long term anchor on the Seahawks' offensive line. McIntosh's playing time increased throughout the 2000 season and he started 10 games during his rookie season. However, in 2001 he suffered a neck injury during training camp that limited him to just three starts. McIntosh continued to suffer from neck issues the following year and never returned to his pre-injury level of production, leading to his retirement from the NFL just before the 2003 season after an unsuccessful comeback attempt.

== Post-playing career ==
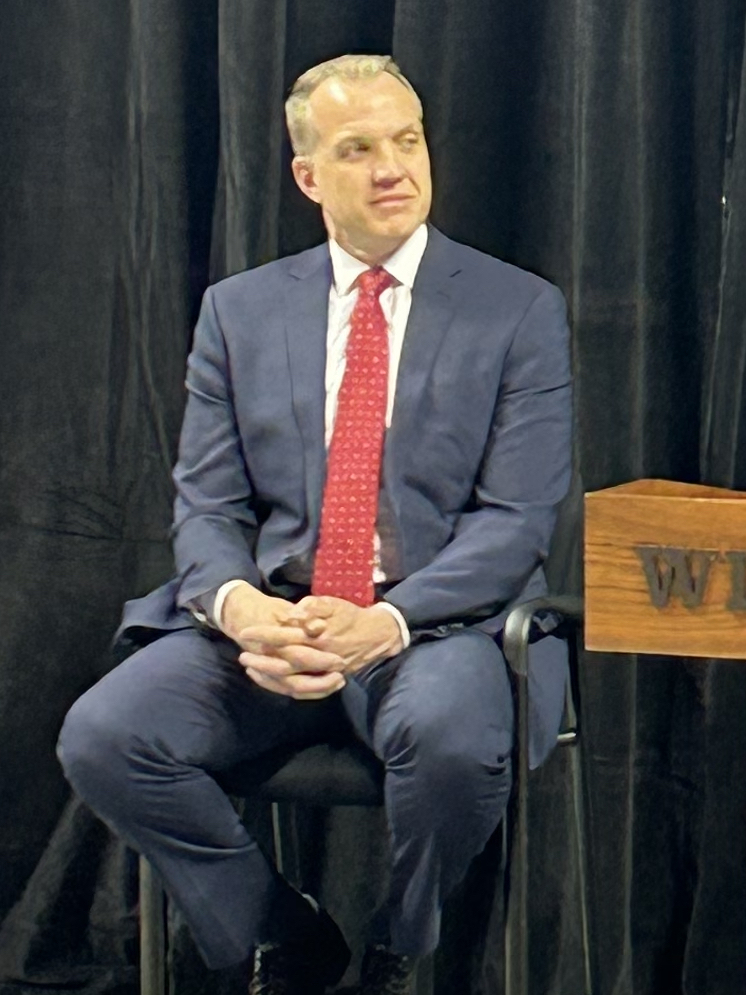
McIntosh in 2023

After his playing career ended, McIntosh entered the business world where he pursued various start-up ventures focused primarily in health and wellness-related industries. In 2014, he returned to the University of Wisconsin-Madison as the director of business development in the Wisconsin Athletic Department. McIntosh was quickly promoted to deputy athletic director in July 2017. During his time at the Wisconsin Athletic Department under athletic director Barry Alvarez, McIntosh oversaw the hiring of Wisconsin coaches Greg Gard and Paul Chryst, helped establish and expand the Inclusion and Engagement unit and Department of Clinical & Sport Psychology, served as government affairs liaison, and played a key role in the identification of financial threats posed by the COVID-19 pandemic.

When Alvarez announced his retirement in April 2021, a national search was launched to replace him as Wisconsin's athletic director. As deputy athletic director at the time, McIntosh was seen as the frontrunner to land the athletic director job, having been groomed for the position by Alvarez. Chancellor Rebecca Blank announced on June 2, 2021, that he had been selected as Alvarez's successor. McIntosh is just the third athletic director at Wisconsin since 1989 and follows the long tenures of Pat Richter and Alvarez, each of whom oversaw a continuous rise of many of Wisconsin's athletic programs to national prominence beginning in the 1990s. Upon his promotion, McIntosh said "Barry and Pat caused our program to be risen out of the ashes...The challenges are different today. The context is different today. It will require a different style of leadership, a different approach. I'm confident that the approach we take will position us well in the future."

On April 13, 2026, McIntosh departed Wisconsin to become the Deputy Commissioner for Strategy for the Big Ten Conference.
