= Tom Burke (American football) =

American football player (born 1976)

No. 95
- Position: Defensive end

Personal information
- Born: October 12, 1976 (age 50); Poplar, Wisconsin, U.S.
- Listed height: 6 ft 3 in (1.91 m)
- Listed weight: 275 lb (125 kg)

Career information
- High school: Northwestern (Maple, Wisconsin)
- College: Wisconsin
- NFL draft: 1999: 3rd round, 83rd overall pick

Career history
- Arizona Cardinals (1999–2002)

Awards and highlights
- Bill Willis Trophy (1998); Unanimous All-American (1998); Big Ten Co-Defensive Player of the Year (1998); Big Ten Defensive Lineman of the Year (1998); First-team All-Big Ten (1998); Second-team All-Big Ten (1997)

Career NFL statistics
- Games played: 36
- Games started: 12
- Tackles: 49
- Sacks: 4.5
- Fumbles recovered: 1
- Stats at Pro Football Reference

Thomas Allen Burke (born October 12, 1976) is an American former professional football player who was a defensive end for four seasons with the Arizona Cardinals in the National Football League (NFL). He played college football for the Wisconsin Badgers, earning unanimous All-American honors in 1998. During the 1997–1998 season, Burke led all college football with 22 sacks and 31 total tackles for loss while helping Wisconsin to a Rose Bowl victory and #5 overall ranking. He was chosen in the third round of the 1999 NFL draft by the Cardinals and played all four years of his NFL career with Arizona.

== Early life ==
Burke was born in Poplar, Wisconsin. He attended Northwestern High School in nearby Maple, Wisconsin, and played for the Northwestern Tigers high school football team, of the Wisconsin Interscholastic Athletic Association (WIAA), Heart O' North Conference.

== College career ==
Burke attended the University of Wisconsin in Madison, and played for the Wisconsin Badgers football team from 1995 to 1998. As a senior in 1998, he was recognized as a unanimous All-American, Big Ten Defensive Player of the Year, first-team All-Big Ten, and received the Bill Willis Trophy. He holds the Big Ten record for most sacks in a single season with 22.

== Professional career ==
The Arizona Cardinals selected Burke in the third round (83rd pick overall) of the 1999 NFL draft, and he played for the Cardinals from 1999 to 2002. In four NFL seasons, he appeared in 36 games, started 12, and accumulated 49 tackles and 4.5 sacks.
