= Aaron Gibson =

American football player (born 1977)

No. 71, 63, 78
- Position: Offensive tackle

Personal information
- Born: September 27, 1977 (age 49); Indianapolis, Indiana, U.S.
- Listed height: 6 ft 6 in (1.98 m)
- Listed weight: 370 lb (168 kg)

Career information
- High school: Decatur Central (Indianapolis)
- College: Wisconsin
- NFL draft: 1999: 1st round, 27th overall pick

Career history
- Detroit Lions (1999–2001); Dallas Cowboys (2001–2002); Chicago Bears (2002–2004); Buffalo Bills (2006)*; Austin Wranglers (2007); Utah Blaze (2008)*; Dallas Desperados (2008)*; Cleveland Gladiators (2008); Bossier-Shreveport Battle Wings (2010)
- * Offseason or practice squad member only

Awards and highlights
- Consensus All-American (1998); First-team All-Big Ten (1998)

Career NFL statistics
- Games played: 38
- Games started: 34
- Stats at Pro Football Reference

Aaron Gibson (born September 27, 1977) is an American former professional football player who was an offensive tackle in the National Football League (NFL) for the Detroit Lions, Dallas Cowboys and Chicago Bears. He played college football at the University of Wisconsin. Gibson previously held the record for heaviest NFL player ever, weighing in at 410 lb (186 kg) in 2002. He was surpassed by Desmond Watson in 2025, who was measured at 464 lb (210 kg).

== Early life ==
Gibson attended Decatur Central High School, where he lettered in football and track. He weighed over 350 lb (159 kg) in high school.

He was a two-way player. As a senior, he was a first-team All-state selection and was named as a Top 33 Pick by the Bloomington Herald-Times. As a defensive tackle, he had 8 fumble recoveries and 11 passes defensed.

== College career ==
Gibson accepted a football scholarship from the University of Wisconsin. He didn't play in his freshman year because of failing to meet the requirements of Proposition 48. The next year, he was a reserve right tackle behind All-American Jerry Wunsch and was used primarily as a blocking tight end, after making his debut in the fifth game against Ohio State University.

As a junior in 1997, he became the starter at right tackle. He spent two seasons blocking for Heisman Trophy winner Ron Dayne, who set the NCAA Division I career rushing record (6,397 yards) in 1999.

As a senior in 1998, Gibson was recognized as a consensus first-team All-American, after having been named to the first-teams of the Football Writers Association, American Football Coaches Association, and the Football News and the Walter Camp Foundation. He was also a unanimous first-team All-Big Ten Conference selection. He was the first player in school history to be named a finalist for the Lombardi Award and Outland Trophy awards.

== Professional career ==
=== Pre-draft ===
In the 1999 NFL Scouting Combine, Gibson ran the 40-yard dash in 5.3 seconds. He was described as "a proto-type right tackle in the NFL," for having "a huge body with big legs and a gigantic chest".

Pre-draft measurables
Height	Weight	Arm length	Hand span	40-yard dash	10-yard split	20-yard split	20-yard shuttle	Three-cone drill	Vertical jump	Broad jump	Bench press
6 ft 6 1/8 in (1.98 m)	386 lb (175 kg)	35 1/2 in (0.90 m)	10 1/2 in (0.27 m)	5.35 s	1.79 s	3.02 s	4.54 s	7.99 s	24.0 in (0.61 m)	9 ft 3 in (2.82 m)	31 reps
All values from NFL Combine

=== Detroit Lions ===
Gibson was selected by the Detroit Lions with the 27th overall pick in the 1999 National Football League Draft. He was expected to be the starting right tackle as a rookie, but suffered a left shoulder injury in an April post-draft minicamp and was placed on the injured reserve list.

The following season, he started the first ten games at right tackle, until suffering a right shoulder injury (torn posterior subluxation) and being placed on the injured reserve list on December 4. In 2001, he started five of the first six games of the season, before being waived on October 30.

=== Dallas Cowboys ===
On October 31, 2001, he was claimed off waivers by the Dallas Cowboys but played only in the season finale. In 2002, Gibson had the distinction of becoming the NFL's first player to be officially listed at 400 lb (181 kg). Gibson was limited by a knee injury in training camp and eventually released on September 18, 2002.

=== Chicago Bears ===
On November 26, 2002, he was signed by the Chicago Bears as a free agent to replace an injured Marc Colombo. In 2003, he had his most consistent professional season, starting at right tackle in all 16 games with the Bears, after Colombo was lost for the year when he was placed on the Physically Unable to Perform list. In 2004, he played four games (three starts) and was declared inactive in 10. It would be the last season in which he made an appearance in a regular season NFL game.

=== Buffalo Bills ===
On April 5, 2006, Gibson signed with the Buffalo Bills as a free agent. He was cut on August 28.

=== Austin Wranglers ===
On January 24, 2007, he was signed by the Austin Wranglers of the Arena Football League. On April 4, he was placed on the injured reserve list. On May 5, he was activated. He played in 11 games and had three tackles for the season.

=== Utah Blaze ===
On July 30, 2007, Gibson was traded along with defensive lineman Rob Schroeder to the Utah Blaze in exchange for past considerations.

=== Dallas Desperados ===
On October 12, 2007, he was traded to the Dallas Desperados in exchange for offensive lineman Devin Wyman and future considerations. On February 22, 2008, Gibson was released by the Desperados, owned by Jerry Jones, who also owned the Dallas Cowboys, where Gibson had previously played.

=== Cleveland Gladiators ===
On March 13, 2008, he was signed by the Cleveland Gladiators of the AFL. On May 22, he was placed on the injured reserve list.

=== Bossier-Shreveport Battle Wings ===
On March 22, 2010, he was assigned to the Bossier-Shreveport Battle Wings of the AFL. On August 9, he was suspended by the team. He was not re-signed after the season.
