= Dave Costa (offensive lineman) =

American gridiron football player (born 1978)

David C. Costa (born September 8, 1978, in Erie, Pennsylvania) is a former NFL and Canadian Football League offensive lineman. Costa attended Ellwood City High School (Wolverines) in Pennsylvania, and was a four-year letterman in football. He was named the Team M.V.P. as a senior.

After graduating from the University of Wisconsin (Badgers), (where Costa was a member of 2 Rose bowl winning teams), Costa had played for San Francisco 49ers (2001–2002) and attended camp with Tennessee Titans and Pittsburgh Steelers. Costa spent a year in Europe (with the Scottish Claymores, 2003), and in the CFL for the Toronto Argonauts (2004–2007) and was a member of the 2004 Grey Cup Champion team. Costa ended his CFL career with Calgary.

Upon retirement from pro football, Dave attended and graduated from The Center of Emergency Medicine and is a Nationally registered Paramedic. Costa was employed by the City of Pittsburgh (PA.), Department of Public Safety, Emergency Medical Services, where he held the position of Paramedic. Costa later became a Firefighter with the City of Pittsburgh. Costa and his wife, a Pittsburgh police officer, had three children.
