= 1999 Rose Bowl =

American college football game

1999 Rose Bowl presented by AT&T
- 85th Rose Bowl Game
Wisconsin Badgers	UCLA Bruins
(10–1)	(10–1)
38	31
Head coach: Barry Alvarez	Head coach: Bob Toledo
AP / Coaches / BCS; 9 / 8 / 9	AP / Coaches / BCS; 6 / 5 / 5
	1	2	3	4	Total
Wisconsin	7	17	7	7	38
UCLA	7	14	7	3	31
- Date: January 1, 1999
- Season: 1998
- Stadium: Rose Bowl Stadium
- Location: Pasadena, California
- MVP: Ron Dayne (Wisconsin RB)
- National anthem: University of Wisconsin Marching Band
- Referee: John Laurie (Big 12)
- Halftime show: University of Wisconsin Marching Band, UCLA Band
- Attendance: 93,872

United States TV coverage
- Network: ABC
- Announcers: Keith Jackson (play-by-play); Bob Griese (analyst); Lynn Swann (sideline)

The 1999 Rose Bowl was the 85th Rose Bowl game and was played on Friday January 1, 1999, at the Rose Bowl Stadium in Pasadena, California. It was a college football bowl game at the end of the 1998 NCAA Division I-A football season. Wisconsin defeated UCLA by a score of 38–31. Ron Dayne of Wisconsin was named the Rose Bowl Player of the Game. He tied a modern Rose Bowl record with four touchdowns. This was the first year that the Rose Bowl became part of the Bowl Championship Series, ending a long-standing agreement between the Big Ten and the "West Representative" (PCC/AAWU) and the first year that the game was branded with corporate sponsorship. Unlike the other bowl games, the sponsor was not added to the title of the game, but instead as a presenter, so it became known as The Rose Bowl Game presented by AT&T.

== Bowl Championship Series ==
The Bowl Coalition was restructured into the Bowl Alliance for the 1995 season, involving five conferences (reduced to four for the 1996 season) and three bowls. The championship game rotated among the three bowls. However, it still didn't include the Pac-10 or Big Ten champs.

Michigan and Nebraska split the National Championship during the 1997 season after never having met on the field. After a protracted round of negotiations, the Bowl Alliance was reconfigured into the Bowl Championship Series for the 1998 season. The Pasadena Tournament of Roses, which operates the Rose Bowl Game, agreed to release the Big Ten or Pac-10 champions if necessary to facilitate a national championship game. In return, the Rose Bowl was added to the yearly national championship game rotation.

== Teams ==
=== UCLA Bruins ===
Beginning in November, the Bruins were ranked number 2 behind Tennessee. It appeared that they would face the Volunteers in the BCS championship. The UCLA Bruins went undefeated through the 1998 football season until their final game. In late September, Miami had been forced to postpone their game with UCLA due to Hurricane Georges. The game was rescheduled for December 5 and for the #2-ranked Bruins, a trip to the National Championship game was at stake. The Hurricanes put up over 600 yards of total offense and the result was a stunning 49–45 Miami victory. Instead of advancing to the first Bowl Championship series game (the 1999 Fiesta Bowl) as a contender for the national championship, the Bruins "settled" for the Rose Bowl, something that previously had been the ultimate goal of the Pacific-10 conference champion.

=== Wisconsin Badgers ===
Wisconsin ended up in a three-way tie for first place in the Big Ten with Michigan and Ohio State. All three teams had 7–1 conference records and were conference co-champions. Michigan had defeated Wisconsin 27–10 in "The Big House". Wisconsin and Ohio State did not meet. At the time, the Big Ten awarded the Rose Bowl invitation to the tied team which had gone the longest period of time without an invitation: Michigan had been in the 1998 Rose Bowl, Ohio State had been in the 1997 Rose Bowl, while Wisconsin had last been in the 1994 Rose Bowl.

The circumstances of this selection and the fact that UCLA had so recently fallen from the lofty #2 in the nation status led many to deride and seriously underestimate the Badgers; most notably, ESPN analyst Craig James with his infamous declaration that Wisconsin was "the worst team to ever play in the Rose Bowl".

== Game summary ==
The weather was sunny and 74 degrees and the crowd of 93,872 at the Rose Bowl was described by one reporter as a "sea of red [...] with a few small breaks of Bruin blue."

In the first half, both teams scored three touchdowns, with UCLA answering each of the first two Wisconsin scores and then taking its only lead of the game (21–14) in the second quarter. After re-tying the game, Wisconsin would add a field goal to account for the halftime score of 24–21.

All six touchdowns had come on lengthy drives, with UCLA's best starting position being its own 35-yard line and Wisconsin's its own 25. The Badgers' scoring plays were emblematic of their style of play: Relying heavily on the run (running the ball 48 times in the game as opposed to just 17 passing attempts), they scored three times on rushes by Ron Dayne, including a 54-yard run for the first touchdown of the game. UCLA on the other hand, scored its three first-half touchdowns on passing plays, including one thrown by wide receiver Freddie Mitchell on a trick play.

On the opening drive of the second half, Wisconsin continued the scoring trend, going ahead 31–21 on Ron Dayne's fourth touchdown run of the game. This would, however, turn out to be the last offensive score by the Badgers.

UCLA would then sustain two long drives of its own. However, the Bruins lost the ball on a fumble on the Wisconsin 6-yard line before scoring a touchdown on their next drive on a 10-yard run by Jermaine Lewis to cut the Wisconsin lead to 31–28.

The eventual "clinching" play occurred on UCLA's next drive, at the start of the fourth quarter, when Cade McNown threw an interception to Jamar Fletcher, which was returned 47 yards for a Wisconsin touchdown to extend the Badgers' lead to 38–28.

On its next possession, UCLA came up short on a fake punt, but subsequently regained possession after a Wisconsin fumble on a bad snap. Starting from the Wisconsin 33, the Bruins went deep on their first play, which resulted in Jamar Fletcher being called for pass interference on Danny Farmer in the endzone. However, UCLA had to settle for a field goal to make the score 38–31 Wisconsin with 6:05 left in the game.

On their last possession, the Bruins allowed a "sack of McNown on fourth-and-3 at the Wisconsin 47-yard line with 59 seconds remaining." This sealed the victory for the Badgers, who won despite being outgained 538–497 in terms of offensive yards and not scoring an offensive touchdown for the last 26 1/2 minutes of the game.

== Scoring summary ==
=== First quarter ===
- Wisconsin – Ron Dayne, 54-yard run. Matt Davenport converts. 3:50. 7–0 UW
- UCLA – Jermaine Lewis, 38-yard pass from Cade McNown. Chris Sailer converts. 0:57. 7–7

=== Second quarter ===
- Wisconsin – Dayne, seven-yard run. Davenport converts. 10:58. 14–7 UW
- UCLA – Durell Price, 61-yard pass from Freddie Mitchell. Sailer converts. 10:08. 14–14
- UCLA – Danny Farmer, 41-yard pass from McNown. Sailer converts. 5:15. 21–14 UCLA
- Wisconsin – Dayne, 10-yard run. Davenport converts. 3:00. 21–21
- Wisconsin – Davenport, 40-yard field goal. 0:17. 24–21 UW

=== Third quarter ===
- Wisconsin – Dayne, 22-yard run. Davenport converts. 11:28. 31–21 UW
- UCLA – Lewis, 10-yard run. Sailer converts. 4:06. 31–28 UW

=== Fourth quarter ===
- Wisconsin – Jamar Fletcher, 46-yard interception return. Davenport converts. 14:08. 38–28 UW
- UCLA — Sailer, 30-yard field goal 6:05. 38–31 UW

== Statistics ==
Team stats	Wisconsin	UCLA
First downs	22	25
Net Yards Rushing	343	120
Net Yards Passing	154	418
Total Yards	497	538
PC–PA–Int.	9–17–0	21–36–1
Punts–Avg.	5–41.2	3–47.0
Fumbles–Lost	2–1	1–1
Penalties–Yards	7–45	9–94

== Game notes ==
- Several Rose Bowl records were equaled or broken. The UCLA Bruins set the single-team Rose Bowl record for total yards. In his final college game, Cade McNown, the UCLA quarterback, passed for 340 yards, the fourth-highest total in bowl history, and UCLA finished with 538 yards, 418 in the air.
- Wisconsin running back Ron Dayne tied the modern Rose Bowl record of four touchdowns along with Eric Ball from the 1986 Rose Bowl and Sam Cunningham from the 1973 Rose Bowl.
- Ron Dayne rushed for 246 yards, one short of the Rose Bowl Game record set by USC’s Charles White in 1980.
- The teams would break an older record of 931 combined yards of offense, combining for 1,035 total yards.

== Aftermath ==
=== Rose Bowl records ===
Eight Rose Bowl records were set or tied in the game.

With his four touchdowns, Ron Dayne tied three modern Rose Bowl touchdown records: most touchdowns, most rushing touchdowns and most career rushing touchdowns. With 24 points, he also tied most points in game and career. These records are shared along with Eric Ball from the 1986 Rose Bowl and Sam Cunningham from the 1973 Rose Bowl. Vince Young would also join this group following the 2006 Rose Bowl, and the records still stand as of the 2015 Rose Bowl. Dayne was named the Rose Bowl MVP for 1999 and would repeat this feat in the 2000 Rose Bowl, becoming one of only three (now, four) players to ever repeat as a Rose Bowl MVP (and the only player from the Big Ten Conference).

For the teams, the following records were broken, but no longer stand.

- Total offense: UCLA, 538 yards (old record: 519 by Southern California vs. Ohio State in the 1980 Rose Bowl, surpassed by 574 yards for USC in the 2006 Rose Bowl).
- Total offense, two teams: UCLA and Wisconsin, 1,035 yards (old record: 931 yards by Oregon and Penn State in the 1995 Rose Bowl and Southern California and Ohio State in the 1980 Rose Bowl, surpassed by USC and Texas with 1,130 yards in the 2006 Rose Bowl).
- Most yards per play: 7.6, Wisconsin (old record: 7.5 by Iowa vs. California in the 1959 Rose Bowl, surpassed by Miami at 7.74 in the 2002 Rose Bowl).
- Most points in one half, two teams (tie): 45; Wisconsin 24, UCLA 21 (ties Southern California 35, Ohio State 10 in the 1973 Rose Bowl, surpassed by USC and Texas with 53 points in the second half of the 2006 Rose Bowl).
