= 2001 Wisconsin Badgers football team =

American college football season

2001 Wisconsin Badgers football
- Conference: Big Ten Conference
- Record: 5–7 (3–5 Big Ten)
- Head coach: Barry Alvarez (12th season)
- Offensive coordinator: Brian White (3rd season)
- Offensive scheme: Multiple
- Defensive coordinator: Kevin Cosgrove (7th season)
- Base defense: 4–3
- MVP: Lee Evans
- Captains: Mark Anelli; Brooks Bollinger; Wendell Bryant; Mike Echols; Nick Greisen; Chad Kuhns
- Home stadium: Camp Randall Stadium

2001 Big Ten Conference football standings
	Conf.			Overall
Team	W		L	W		L
No. 12 Illinois $	7	–	1	10	–	2
No. 20 Michigan	6	–	2	8	–	4
Ohio State	5	–	3	7	–	5
Iowa	4	–	4	7	–	5
Purdue	4	–	4	6	–	6
Penn State	4	–	4	5	–	6
Indiana	4	–	4	5	–	6
Michigan State	3	–	5	7	–	5
Wisconsin	3	–	5	5	–	7
Minnesota	2	–	6	4	–	7
Northwestern	2	–	6	4	–	7
$ – BCS representative as conference champion; Rankings from AP Poll

The 2001 Wisconsin Badgers football team was an American football team that represented the University of Wisconsin–Madison as a member of the Big Ten Conference during the 2001 NCAA Division I-A football season. In their 12th year under head coach Barry Alvarez, the Badgers compiled a 5–7 record (3–5 in conference games), finished in a tie for eighth in the Big Ten, and were outscored by a total of 346 to 313. Against ranked opponents, they defeated No. 21 Ohio State and lost to No. 7 Oregon, No. 19 Fresno State, and No. 11 Michigan. They also lost by a 63–32 score at home against unranked Indiana in one of the worst losses in program history. The Badgers did not play in a bowl game and were not ranked in the final polls. It was the Badgers' only season with a losing record in the 28 years from 1996 and 2023.

Key players included:

- Sophomore wide receiver Lee Evans tallied 75 receptions for 1,545 yards, 20.6 yards per reception, and nine touchdowns. Evans received first-team honors from Pro Football Weekly and Football News on the 2001 All-America college football team..
- Freshman running back Anthony Davis led the team in both rushing (1,466 yards) and scoring (66 points). He had 10 games of 100 or more yards rushing, including 200 against Penn State.
- Quarterback duties were split between junior Brooks Bollinger (1,257 passing yards, 117.72 passer rating) and sophomore Jim Sorgi (1,096 passing yards, 128.61 passer rating).
- Defensive tackle Wendell Bryant tallied 17 tackles for loss and eight sacks. He received first-team All-America honors from the American Football Coaches Association, Football News, and CNNSI.

The team played its home games at Camp Randall Stadium in Madison, Wisconsin.

== Schedule ==
Date	Time	Opponent	Rank	Site	TV	Result	Attendance	Source
August 25	1:00 p.m.	vs. Virginia*	No. 22	Camp Randall Stadium; Madison, WI (Eddie Robinson Classic)	FSN	W 26–17	76,740	
September 1	7:00 p.m.	at No. 7 Oregon*	No. 22	Autzen Stadium; Eugene, OR	ABC	L 28–31	45,919	
September 8	11:00 a.m.	No. 19 Fresno State*	No. 23	Camp Randall Stadium; Madison, WI	ESPN	L 20–32	78,506	
September 22	11:00 a.m.	at Penn State		Beaver Stadium; University Park, PA	ABC	W 18–6	107,253	
September 29	1:00 p.m.	No. 7 (I-AA) Western Kentucky*		Camp Randall Stadium; Madison, WI		W 24–6	75,662	
October 6	1:00 p.m.	Indiana		Camp Randall Stadium; Madison, WI		L 32–63	79,264	
October 13	2:30 p.m.	at No. 21 Ohio State		Ohio Stadium; Columbus, OH	ABC	W 20–17	103,520	
October 20	11:00 a.m.	at Illinois		Memorial Stadium; Champaign, IL	ESPN	L 35–42	70,904	
October 27	11:00 a.m.	Michigan State^{†}		Camp Randall Stadium; Madison, WI	ESPN Plus	L 28–42	79,108	
November 3	11:00 a.m.	Iowa		Camp Randall Stadium; Madison, WI (rivalry)	ESPN Plus	W 34–28	79,421	
November 17	2:30 p.m.	No. 11 Michigan		Camp Randall Stadium; Madison, WI	ABC	L 17–20	79,633	
November 24	11:00 a.m.	at Minnesota		Hubert H. Humphrey Metrodome; Minneapolis, MN (rivalry)	ESPN2	L 31–42	55,890	
*Non-conference game; ^{†}Homecoming; Rankings from AP Poll released prior to the game; All times are in Central time

== Game summaries ==
=== Virginia ===
Virginia vs Wisconsin – Game summary

Quarter	1	2	3	4	Total
Cavaliers	3	0	7	7	17
No. 22 Badgers	0	10	9	7	26

at Camp Randall Stadium

- Date: August 25, 2001
- Game time: 1:00 p.m.
- Game weather: 66 °F (19 °C); Rain; Wind at NNE 5 MPH
- Game attendance: 76,740
- Referee: T. Ahlers
- TV: FSN

Game information

First quarter

- VA – David Greene 35-yard field goal, 11:53. Virginia 3–0. Drive: 6 plays, 10 yards, 3:07.

Second quarter

- WIS – Jerone Pettus 16-yard TD run (Mike Allen kick), 14:05. Wisconsin 7–3. Drive: 2 plays,1 8 yards, 0:44.
- WIS – Mike Allen 22-yard field goal, 10:05. Wisconsin 10–3. Drive: 4 plays, 2 yards, 1:28.

Third quarter

- WIS – Mike Allen 28-yard field goal, 10:59. Wisconsin 13–3. Drive: 9 plays, 69 yards, 4:01.
- VA – Billy McMullen 33-yard pass from Bryson Spinner (David Greene kick), 3:08. Wisconsin 13–10. Drive: 8 plays, 85 yards, 3:12.
- WIS – Lee Evans 38-yard pass from Jim Sorgi (Mike Allen kick failed), 0:39. Wisconsin 19–10. Drive: 5 plays, 80 yards, 2:29.

Fourth quarter

- WIS – Lee Evans 78-yard pass from Jim Sorgi (Mike Allen kick), 11:01. Wisconsin 26–10. Drive: 2 plays, 80 yards, 0:56.
- VA – Tyree Foreman 14-yard pass from Bryson Spinner (David Greene kick), 5:54. Wisconsin 26–17. Drive: 6 plays, 74 yards, 1:36.

Top passers

- VA – Bryson Spinner – 10/22, 154 yards, 2 TD
- WIS – Jim Sorgi – 5/11, 150 yards, 2 TD

Top rushers

- VA – Arlen Harris – 15 rushes, 79 yards
- WIS – Anthony Davis – 24 rushes, 147 yards

Top receivers

- VA – Billy McMullen – 3 receptions, 62 yards, TD
- WIS – Lee Evans – 4 receptions, 135 yards, 2 TD

Top defenders

- VA – John Duckett – 9 tackles
- WIS – Mike Broussard – 9 tackles, 2 pass breakups

=== Oregon ===
Wisconsin vs Oregon – Game summary

Quarter	1	2	3	4	Total
No. 22 Badgers	0	7	14	7	28
No. 7 Ducks	10	0	14	7	31

at Autzen Stadium

- Date: September 1, 2001
- Game time: 7:00 p.m.
- Game weather: 79 °F (26 °C); Partly cloudy; Wind at W 10 MPH
- Game attendance: 45,919
- Referee: J. Stricherz
- TV: ABC

Game information

First quarter

- ORE – Jared Siegal 20-yard field goal, 9:50. Oregon 3–0. Drive: 9 plays, 48 yards, 2:34.
- ORE – Justin Peelle 23-yard pass from Joey Harrington (Jared Siegal kick), 6:00. Oregon 10–0. Drive: 2 plays, 32 yards, 0:19.

Second quarter

- WIS – Nick Davis 18-yard pass from Jim Sorgi (Mike Allen kick), 12:01. Oregon 10–7. Drive: 10 plays, 80 yards, 3:51.

Third quarter

- WIS – Darrin Charles 13-yard pass from Jim Sorgi (Mike Allen kick), 11:54. Wisconsin 14–10. Drive: 4 plays, 51 yards, 2:00.
- ORE – Justin Peelle 11-yard pass from Joey Harrington (Jared Siegal kick), 7:21. Oregon 17–14. Drive: 11 plays, 71 yards, 4:33.
- WIS – Anthony Davis 69-yard TD run (Mike Allen kick), 6:55. Wisconsin 21–17. Drive: 2 plays, 69 yards, 0:26.
- ORE – Maurice Morris 1-yard pass from Joey Harrington (Jared Siegal kick) 2:43. Oregon 24–21. Drive: 8 plays, 87 yards, 4:12.

Fourth quarter

- WIS – Jim Sorgi 1-yard TD run (Mike Allen kick), 9:37. Wisconsin 28–24. Drive: 4 plays, 61 yards, 1:48.
- ORE – Joey Harrington 2-yard TD run (Jared Siegal kick) 4:03. Oregon 31–28. Drive: 9 plays, 78 yards, 2:34.

Top passers

- ORE – Joey Harrington – 23/48, 278 yards, 3 TD, 2 INT
- WIS – Jim Sorgi – 16/32, 231 yards, 2 TD, INT

Top rushers

- ORE – Onterrio Smith – 8 rushes, 88 yards
- WIS – Anthony Davis – 13 rushes, 130 yards, TD

Top receivers

- ORE – Justin Peelle – 4 receptions, 71 yards, 2 TD
- WIS – Lee Evans – 8 receptions, 168 yards

Top defenders

- ORE – Keith Lewis – 14 tackles, forced fumble
- WIS – Nick Greisen – 13 tackles, 2 TFL

=== Fresno State ===
Fresno State vs Wisconsin – Game summary

Quarter	1	2	3	4	Total
No. 19 Bulldogs	10	0	19	3	32
No. 23 Badgers	14	6	0	0	20

at Camp Randall Stadium

- Date: September 8, 2001
- Game time: 11:00 a.m.
- Game attendance: 78,506
- TV: ESPN

Game information

First quarter

- WIS – Jim Sorgi 1-yard TD run (Mike Allen kick), 13:46. Wisconsin 7–0. Drive: 4 plays, 72 yards, 1:14.
- FS – Marque Davis 20-yard pass from David Carr (Asen Asparuhov kick), 9:00. Tie 7–7. Drive: 12 plays, 64 yards, 4:46.
- WIS – Lee Evans 53-yard pass from Jim Sorgi (Mike Allen kick), 3:01. Wisconsin 14–7. Drive: 4 plays, 80 yards, 1:58.
- FS – Asen Asparuhov 42-yard field goal, 0:09. Wisconsin 14–10. Drive: 9 plays, 49 yards, 2:52.

Second quarter

- WIS – Mike Allen 37-yard field goal, 9:44. Wisconsin 17–10. Drive: 11 plays, 46 yards, 5:25.
- WIS – Mike Allen 50-yard field goal, 4:36. Wisconsin 20–10. Drive: 7 plays, 34 yards, 2:45.

Third quarter

- FS – Bernard Berrian 96-yard kickoff return (Alec Greco rush), 14:46. Wisconsin 20–18. Drive: 1 plays, 96 yards, 0:14.
- FS – Rodney Wright 16-yard pass from David Carr (David Carr run), 12:26. Fresno State 26–20. Drive: 4 plays, 31 yards, 1:26.
- FS – Asen Asparuhov 34-yard field goal, 1:14. Fresno State 29–20. Drive: 8 plays, 23 yards, 2:38.

Fourth quarter

- FS – Asen Asparuhov 17-yard field goal, 6:26. Fresno State 32–20. Drive: 11 plays, 61 yards, 5:46.

Top passers

- FS – David Carr – 23/38, 240 yards, 2 TD, INT
- WIS – Jim Sorgi – 13/31, 246 yards, TD, 2 INT

Top rushers

- FS – Paris Gaines – 19 rushes, 89 yards
- WIS – Anthony Davis – 24 rushes, 137 yards

Top receivers

- FS – Rodney Wright – 9 receptions, 87 yards, TD
- WIS – Lee Evans – 7 receptions, 182 yards, TD

Top defenders

- FS – M. Rodriguez – 10 tackles, TFL
- WIS – Bryson Thompson – 18 tackles

=== Penn State ===
Wisconsin vs Penn State – Game summary

Quarter	1	2	3	4	Total
Badgers	6	6	6	0	18
Nittany Lions	0	0	6	0	6

at Beaver Stadium

- Date: September 22, 2001
- Game time: 11:15 a.m.
- Game weather: 72 °F (22 °C); Sunny; Wind at N/A
- Game attendance: 107,253
- Referee: R. Honig
- TV: ABC

Game information

First quarter

- WIS – Mark Anelli 3-yard pass from Brooks Bollinger (Mike Allen kick blocked), 7:51. Wisconsin 6–0. Drive: 9 plays, 61 yards, 4:03.

Second quarter

- WIS – Mike Allen 30-yard field goal, 13:08. Wisconsin 9–0. Drive: 15 plays, 58 yards, 6:47.
- WIS – Mike Allen 21-yard field goal, 6:54. Wisconsin 12–0. Drive: 7 plays, 43 yards, 4:17.

Third quarter

- PS – Larry Johnson 50-yard pass from Matt Senneca (David Kimball kick failed), 6:20. Wisconsin 12–6. Drive: 6 plays, 80 yards, 2:24.
- WIS – Brooks Bollinger 3-yard TD run (Brooks Bollinger run failed), 1:43. Wisconsin 18–6. Drive: 11 plays, 78 yards, 4:37.

Fourth quarter

No scoring

Top passers

- PS – Matt Senneca – 3/11, 64 yards, TD
- WIS – Brooks Bollinger – 7/12, 61 yards, TD

Top rushers

- PS – Eric McCoo – 4 rushes, 47 yards
- WIS – Anthony Davis – 37 rushes, 200 yards

Top receivers

- PS – Larry Johnson – 1 reception, 50 yards, TD
- WIS – Mark Anelli – 4 receptions, 28 yards, TD

Top defenders

- PS – Shamar Finney – 9 tackles, INT
- WIS – Wendell Bryant – 8 tackles, 6 TFL, 5 Sacks

=== Western Kentucky ===
Western Kentucky vs Wisconsin – Game summary

Quarter	1	2	3	4	Total
Hilltoppers	3	3	0	0	6
Badgers	3	14	7	0	24

at Camp Randall Stadium

- Date: September 29, 2001
- Game time: 1:00 p.m.
- Game weather: 58 °F (14 °C); Partly cloudy; Wind at 3 mph
- Game attendance: 75,662
- Referee: D. Witvoet

Game information

First quarter

- WIS – Mark Neuser 35-yard field goal, 11:43. Wisconsin 3–0. Drive: 9 plays, 34 yards, 3:17.
- WKU – P. Martinez 29-yard field goal, 0:29. Tie 3–3. Drive: 7 plays, 21 yards, 3:39.

Second quarter

- WIS – Anthony Davis 18-yard TD run (Mark Neuser kick), 12:21. Wisconsin 10–3. Drive: 9 plays, 70 yards, 3:08.
- WIS – Anthony Davis 1-yard TD run (Mark Neuser kick), 3:32. Wisconsin 17–3. Drive: 11 plays, 86 yards, 5:17.
- WKU – P. Martinez 29-yard field goal, 0:00. Wisconsin 17–6. Drive: 8 plays, 28 yards, 2:02.

Third quarter

- WIS – Nick Davis 32-yard pass from Brooks Bollinger (Mark Neuser kick), 1:42. Wisconsin 24–6. Drive: 4 plays, 46 yards, 1:27.

Fourth quarter

No scoring

Top passers

- WKU – J. Johnson – 1/2, 28 yards
- WIS – Brooks Bollinger – 3/10, 50 yards, TD

Top rushers

- WKU – K. Brooks – 12 rushes, 36 yards
- WIS – Anthony Davis – 19 rushes, 89 yards, 2 TD

Top receivers

- WKU – D. Pimpleton – 1 reception, 28 yards
- WIS – Lee Evans – 6 receptions, 85 yards

Top defenders

- WKU – E. Dandy – 14 tackles, 2 TFL
- WIS – Nick Greisen – 16 tackles, 2 TFL, Sack, pass breakup

=== Indiana ===
Indiana vs Wisconsin – Game summary

Quarter	1	2	3	4	Total
Hoosiers	32	10	14	7	63
Badgers	0	17	8	7	32

at Camp Randall Stadium

- Date: October 6, 2001
- Game time: 1:00 p.m.
- Game weather: 40 °F (4 °C); Partly cloudy; Wind at NW 10-15 mph
- Game attendance: 79,264
- Referee: J. Lapetina

Game information

First quarter

- IU – Levron Williams 6-yard TD run (Bryan Robertson kick), 12:55. Indiana 7–0. Drive: 2 plays, 53 yards, 0:28.
- IU – Levron Williams 56-yard TD run (Bryan Robertson kick failed), 11:35. Indiana 13–0. Drive: 1 plays, 56 yards, 0:08.
- IU – Levron Williams 3-yard TD run (Bryan Robertson kick), 9:32. Indiana 20–0. Drive: 4 plays, 39 yards, 1:03.
- IU – Duane Stone 10-yard blocked put return (Bryan Robertson kick failed), 7:32. Indiana 26–0.
- IU – Aaron Halterman 4-yard pass from Antwaan Randle El (Bryan Robertson kick failed), 3:13. Indiana 32–0. Drive: 4 plays, 42 yards, 0:52.

Second quarter

- WIS – Mark Neuser 22-yard field goal, 11:57. Indiana 32–3. Drive: 15 plays, 86 yards, 6:16.
- WIS – Lee Evans 43-yard pass from Brooks Bollinger (Mark Neuser kick), 9:30. Indiana 32–10. Drive: 2 plays, 42 yards, 0:47.
- IU – Levron Williams 8-yard TD run (Bryan Robertson kick), 6:47. Indiana 39–10. Drive: 6 plays, 77 yards, 2:43.
- IU – Bryan Robertson 28-yard field goal, 3:10. Indiana 42–10. Drive: 5 plays, 33 yards, 2:50.
- WIS – Brooks Bollinger 1-yard TD run (Mark Neuser kick), 1:05. Indiana 42–17. Drive: 6 plays, 69 yards, 2:05.

Third quarter

- IU – Levron Williams 7-yard TD run (Bryan Robertson kick), 12:27. Indiana 49–17. Drive: 6 plays, 81 yards, 2:33.'
- WIS – Mark Anelli 10-yard pass from Brooks Bollinger (Mark Anelli pass), 5:43. Indiana 49–25. Drive: 6 plays, 38 yards, 1:54.
- IU – Brian Lewis 1-yard TD run (Bryan Robertson kick), 3:07. Indiana 56–25. Drive: 6 plays, 76 yards, 2:36.'

Fourth quarter

- IU – Levron Williams 51-yard TD run (Bryan Robertson kick), 9:41. Indiana 63–25. Drive: 3 plays, 56 yards, 1:00.'
- WIS – Joey Boese 26-yard fumble return (Mark Neuser kick), 4:24. Indiana 63–32.

Top passers

- IU – Antwaan Randle El – 8/13, 182 yards, TD
- WIS – Brooks Bollinger – 15/24, 222 yards, 2 TD, INT

Top rushers

- IU – Levron Williams – 20 rushes, 280 yards, 6 TD
- WIS – Jerone Pettus – 16 rushes, 82 yards

Top receivers

- IU – Jeremi Johnson – 4 receptions, 96 yards
- WIS – Lee Evans – 9 receptions, 148 yards, TD

Top defenders

- IU – Justin Smith – 11 tackles, 3 TFL, Sack, FF
- WIS – Nick Greisen – 17 tackles, TFL

=== Ohio State ===
Wisconsin vs Ohio State – Game summary

Quarter	1	2	3	4	Total
Badgers	0	7	7	6	20
No. 21 Buckeyes	10	7	0	0	17

at Ohio Stadium

- Date: October 13, 2001
- Game time: 2:30 p.m.
- Game weather: 75 °F (24 °C); Chance of rain; Wind at SE 10-20 mph
- Game attendance: 103,520
- Referee: David Witvoet
- TV: ABC

Game information

First quarter

- OSU – Josh Huston 44-yard field goal, 10:27. Ohio State 3–0. Drive: 11 plays, 32 yards, 4:33.
- OSU – Steve Bellisari 1-yard TD run (Josh Huston kick), 4:28. Ohio State 10–0. Drive: 9 plays, 51 yards, 4:21.

Second quarter

- OSU – Lydell Ross 3-yard TD run (Josh Huston kick), 10:27. Ohio State 17–0. Drive: 11 plays, 80 yards, 4:21.'
- WIS – Anthony Davis 23-yard TD run (Mark Neuser kick), 0:46. Ohio State 17–7. Drive: 1 play, 23 yards, 0:07.

Third quarter

- WIS – Nick Davis 42-yard pass from Brooks Bollinger (Mark Neuser kick), 12:07. Ohio State 17–14. Drive: 7 plays, 80 yards, 2:53.

Fourth quarter

- WIS – Mark Neuser 25-yard field goal, 14:10. Tie 17–17. Drive: 10 plays, 55 yards, 4:13.
- WIS – Mark Neuser 33-yard field goal, 2:10. Wisconsin 20–17. Drive: 7 plays, 55 yards, 2:54.

Top passers

- OSU – Steve Bellisari – 10/21, 132 yards, INT
- WIS – Brooks Bollinger – 12/22, 202 yards, TD, INT

Top rushers

- OSU – Lydell Ross – 14 rushes, 59 yards, TD
- WIS – Anthony Davis – 26 rushes, 103 yards, TD

Top receivers

- OSU – Chris Vance – 4 receptions, 67 yards
- WIS – Nick Davis – 6 receptions, 90 yards, TD

Top defenders

- OSU – Courtland Bullard – 7 tackles, pass breakup
- WIS – Nick Greisen – 17 tackles, 2 TFL

=== Illinois ===
Wisconsin vs Illinois – Game summary

Quarter	1	2	3	4	Total
Badgers	7	0	7	21	35
Fighting Illini	6	16	6	14	42

at Memorial Stadium

- Date: October 20, 2001
- Game time: 11:00 a.m.
- Game weather: 64 °F (18 °C); Sunny; Wind at SW 8 mph
- Game attendance: 70,904
- Referee: Steve Newman
- TV: ESPN

Game information

First quarter

- ILL – Peter Christofilakos 33-yard field goal, 9:54. Illinois 3–0. Drive: 13 plays, 56 yards, 5:06.
- WIS – Brooks Bollinger 25-yard TD run (Mark Neuser kick), 7:37. Wisconsin 7–3. Drive: 7 plays, 81 yards, 2:17.
- ILL – Peter Christofilakos 22-yard field goal, 2:52. Wisconsin 7–6. Drive: 9 plays, 66 yards, 4:45.

Second quarter

- ILL – Rocky Harvey 22-yard pass from Kurt Kittner (Kurt Kittner pass failed), 9:23. Illinois 12–7. Drive: 9 plays, 65 yards, 3:38.
- ILL – Aaron Moorehead 34-yard pass from Kurt Kittner (Peter Christofilakos kick), 3:12. Illinois 19–7. Drive: 9 plays, 65 yards, 2:57.
- ILL – John Gockman 48-yard field goal, 0:03. Illinois 22–7. Drive: 6 plays, 34 yards, 1:16.

Third quarter

- ILL – John Gockman 43-yard field goal, 8:27. Illinois 25–7. Drive: 9 plays, 28 yards, 3:14.
- WIS – Anthony Davis 2-yard TD run (Mark Neuser kick), 4:31. Illinois 25–14. Drive: 9 plays, 80 yards, 3:56.
- ILL – Peter Christofilakos 36-yard field goal, 1:53. Illinois 28–14. Drive: 9 plays, 57 yards, 2:38.

Fourth quarter

- WIS – Lee Evans 4-yard pass from Jim Sorgi (Mark Neuser kick), 14:11. Illinois 28–21. Drive: 7 plays, 80 yards, 2:42.
- WIS – Anthony Davis 17-yard TD run (Mark Neuser kick), 13:43. Tie 28–28. Drive: 2 plays, 28 yards, 0:22.
- WIS – Lee Evans 19-yard pass from Jim Sorgi (Mark Neuser kick), 12:48. Wisconsin 35–28. Drive: 2 plays, 17 yards, 0:44.
- ILL – Brian Hodges 14-yard pass from Kurt Kittner (Peter Christofilakos kick), 12:06. Tie 35–35. Drive: 2 plays, 50 yards, 0:42.
- ILL – Brandon Lloyd 22-yard pass from Kurt Kittner (Peter Christofilakos kick), 6:18. Illinois 42–35. Drive: 10 plays, 64 yards, 4:07.

Top passers

- ILL – Kurt Kittner – 24/45, 401 yards, 4 TD, INT
- WIS – Jim Sorgi – 10/20, 157 yards, 2 TD

Top rushers

- ILL – Antoineo Harris – 24 rushes, 86 yards
- WIS – Anthony Davis – 24 rushes, 116 yards, 2 TD

Top receivers

- ILL – Brandon Lloyd – 8 receptions, 129 yards, TD
- WIS – Lee Evans – 9 receptions, 150 yards, 2 TD

Top defenders

- ILL – Joe Bevis – 9 tackles, 1.5 TFL, 0.5 Sack
- WIS – Nick Greisen – 16 tackles, 2 TFL

=== Michigan State ===
Michigan State vs Wisconsin – Game summary

Quarter	1	2	3	4	Total
Spartans	7	7	21	7	42
Badgers	7	7	7	7	28

at Camp Randall Stadium

- Date: October 27, 2001
- Game time: 11:00 a.m.
- Game weather: 39 °F (4 °C); Partly cloudy; Wind at NW 7 mph
- Game attendance: 79,108
- Referee: D. Lipski
- TV: ESPN+

Game information

First quarter

- WIS – Lee Evans 42-yard pass from Jim Sorgi (Mark Neuser kick), 7:01. Wisconsin 7–0. Drive: 4 plays, 59 yards, 1:28.
- MSU – T. J. Duckett 1-yard TD run (Dave Rayner kick), 3:55. Tie 7–7. Drive: 6 plays, 50 yards, 3:06.

Second quarter

- WIS – Lee Evans 30-yard pass from Jim Sorgi (Mark Neuser kick), 7:03. Wisconsin 14–7. Drive: 4 plays, 59 yards, 1:28.
- MSU – Charles Rogers 5-yard pass from Jeff Smoker (Dave Rayner kick), 1:02. Tie 14–14. Drive: 7 plays, 91 yards, 1:55.

Third quarter

- MSU – T. J. Duckett 43-yard TD run (Dave Rayner kick), 13:22. Michigan State 21–14. Drive: 3 plays, 61 yards, 1:38.
- MSU – Herb Haygood 12-yard pass from Jeff Smoker (Dave Rayner kick), 3:03. Michigan State 28–14. Drive: 4 plays, 87 yards, 1:54.
- WIS – Lee Evans 70-yard pass from Matt Schabert (Mark Neuser kick), 2:04. Michigan State 28–21. Drive: 3 plays, 69 yards, 0:59.
- MSU – Jeff Smoker 8-yard TD run (Dave Rayner kick), 0:20. Michigan State 35–21. Drive: 3 plays, 70 yards, 1:44.

Fourth quarter

- MSU – Charles Rogers 87-yard pass from Jeff Smoker (Dave Rayner kick), 11:25. Michigan State 42–21. Drive: 3 plays, 91 yards, 1:28.
- WIS – Mark Anelli 13-yard pass from Matt Schabert (Mark Neuser kick), 5:13. Michigan State 42–28. Drive: 16 plays, 91 yards, 6:12.

Top passers

- MSU – Jeff Smoker – 13/20, 326 yards, 3 TD, 2 INT
- WIS – Jim Sorgi – 10/19, 177 yards, 2 TD, 2 INT

Top rushers

- MSU – T. J. Duckett – 23 rushes, 186 yards, 2 TD
- WIS – Anthony Davis – 32 rushes, 101 yards

Top receivers

- MSU – Charles Rogers – 5 receptions, 206 yards, 2 TD
- WIS – Lee Evans – 9 receptions, 228 yards, 3 TD

Top defenders

- MSU – Josh Shaw – 12 tackles, 3 TFL
- WIS – Nick Greisen – 12 tackles

=== Iowa ===
Iowa vs Wisconsin – Game summary

Quarter	1	2	3	4	Total
Hawkeyes	0	14	14	0	28
Badgers	10	17	7	0	34

at Camp Randall Stadium

- Date: November 3, 2001
- Game time: 11:00 a.m.
- Game weather: 55 °F (13 °C); Clear; Wind at S 7 mph
- Game attendance: 79,421
- Referee: LeMonnier
- TV: ESPN+

Game information

First quarter

- WIS – Mark Neuser 28-yard field goal, 8:39. Wisconsin 3–0. Drive: 11 plays, 61 yards, 5:15.
- WIS – Brooks Bollinger 2-yard TD run (Mark Neuser kick), 4:35. Wisconsin 10–0. Drive: 7 plays, 51 yards, 3:04.

Second quarter

- IOW – Kahlil Hill 11-yard pass from Brad Banks (Nate Kaeding kick), 12:38. Wisconsin 10–7. Drive: 5 plays, 59 yards, 2:11.
- WIS – Mark Neuser 23-yard field goal, 8:44. Wisconsin 13–7. Drive: 10 plays, 74 yards, 3:54.
- IOW – Kahlil Hill 54-yard pass from Brad Banks (Nate Kaeding kick), 7:56. Iowa 14–13. Drive: 2 plays, 68 yards, 0:48.
- WIS – Jerone Pettus 4-yard TD run (Mark Neuser kick), 5:48. Wisconsin 20–14. Drive: 6 plays, 80 yards, 2:08.
- WIS – Darrin Charles 17-yard pass from Brooks Bollinger (Mark Neuser kick), 2:50. Wisconsin 27–14. Drive: 3 plays, 22 yards, 1:29.

Third quarter

- IOW – Ladell Betts 38-yard TD run (Nate Kaeding kick), 10:45. Wisconsin 27–21. Drive: 4 plays, 56 yards, 1:49.
- WIS – Anthony Davis 2-yard TD run (Mark Neuser kick), 6:10. Wisconsin 34–21. Drive: 8 plays, 77 yards, 4:35.
- IOW – Brad Banks 1-yard TD run (Nate Kaeding kick), 1:41. Wisconsin 34–28. Drive: 10 plays, 71 yards, 4:29.

Fourth quarter

No scoring

Top passers

- IOW – Brad Banks – 11/23, 162 yards, 2 TD, INT
- WIS – Brooks Bollinger – 14/21, 262 yards, TD

Top rushers

- IOW – Ladell Betts – 15 rushes, 121 yards, TD
- WIS – Anthony Davis – 36 rushes, 132 yards, TD

Top receivers

- IOW – Kahlil Hill – 6 receptions, 97 yards, 2 TD
- WIS – Lee Evans – 7 receptions, 175 yards

Top defenders

- IOW – Derek Pagel – 14 tackles, TFL, pass breakup
- WIS – Bryson Thompson – 9 tackles, forced fumble

=== Michigan ===
Michigan vs Wisconsin – Game summary

Quarter	1	2	3	4	Total
No. 11 Wolverines	7	7	3	3	20
Badgers	7	0	10	0	17

at Camp Randall Stadium

- Date: November 17, 2001
- Game time: 2:30 p.m.
- Game weather: 61 °F (16 °C); Clear; Wind at S 7 mph
- Game attendance: 79,633
- Referee: S. Pamon
- TV: ABC

Game information

First quarter

- WIS – Brooks Bollinger 1-yard TD run (Mark Neuser kick), 9:04. Wisconsin 7–0. Drive: 12 plays, 80 yards, 5:56.
- MIC – Deitan Dubuc 1-yard pass from John Navarre (Hayden Epstein kick), 0:36. Tie 7–7. Drive: 10 plays, 40 yards, 4:18.

Second quarter

- MIC – Marlin Jackson 43-yard punt return (Hayden Epstein kick), 8:21. Michigan 14–7.

Third quarter

- MIC – Hayden Epstein 25-yard field goal, 8:27. Michigan 17–7. Drive: 5 plays, -3 yards, 1:34.
- WIS – Anthony Davis 10-yard TD run (Mark Neuser kick), 5:03. Michigan 17–14. Drive: 10 plays, 71 yards, 3:24.
- WIS – Mark Neuser 46-yard field goal, 1:58. Tie 17–17. Drive: 4 plays, -2 yards, 1:40.

Fourth quarter

- MIC – Hayden Epstein 31-yard field goal, 0:10. Michigan 20–17. Drive: 1 play, 0 yards, 0:04.

Top passers

- MIC – John Navarre – 11/24, 58 yards, TD, INT
- WIS – Brooks Bollinger – 14/29, 133 yards

Top rushers

- MIC – B. J. Askew – 16 rushes, 58 yards
- WIS – Anthony Davis – 27 rushes, 103 yards, TD

Top receivers

- MIC – Marquise Walker – 4 receptions, 14 yards
- WIS – Mark Anelli – 5 receptions, 59 yards

Top defenders

- MIC – Victor Hobson – 8 tackles, 3.5 TFL
- WIS – Nick Greisen – 19 tackles, 3 TFL, sack, forced fumble

=== Minnesota ===
Wisconsin vs Minnesota – Game summary

Quarter	1	2	3	4	Total
Badgers	14	7	10	0	31
Golden Gophers	7	21	7	7	42

at Hubert H. Humphrey Metrodome

- Date: November 24, 2001
- Game time: 11:00 a.m.
- Game weather: Indoors
- Game attendance: 55,890
- Referee: Lapetina
- TV: ESPN2

Game information

First quarter

- WIS – Anthony Davis 1-yard TD run (Mark Neuser kick), 8:35. Wisconsin 7–0. Drive: 12 plays, 80 yards, 4:52.
- MIN – Ben Utecht 59-yard pass from Asad Abdul-Khaliq (Dan Nystrom kick), 6:26. Tie 7–7. Drive: 4 plays, 77 yards, 2:09.
- WIS – Brooks Bollinger 1-yard TD run (Mark Neuser kick), 4:00. Wisconsin 14–7. Drive: 7 plays, 65 yards, 2:26.

Second quarter

- MIN – Thomas Tapeh 18-yard TD run (Dan Nystrom kick), 13:46. Tie 14–14. Drive: 13 plays, 88 yards, 5:14.
- MIN – Ben Utecht 38-yard pass from Asad Abdul-Khaliq (Dan Nystrom kick), 10:53. Minnesota 21–14. Drive: 4 plays, 58 yards, 1:50.
- WIS – Anthony Davis 61-yard TD run (Mark Neuser kick), 7:54. Tie 21–21. Drive: 6 plays, 86 yards, 2:59.
- MIN – Marion Barber III 6-yard TD run (Dan Nystrom kick), 5:04. Minnesota 28–21. Drive: 3 plays, 61 yards, 0:48.

Third quarter

- WIS – Anthony Davis 1-yard TD run (Mark Neuser kick), 8:31. Tie 28–28. Drive: 2 plays, 4 yards, 0:12.
- WIS – Mark Neuser 30-yard field goal, 5:29. Wisconsin 31–28. Drive: 6 plays, 48 yards, 2:45.
- MIN – Ron Johnson 45-yard pass from Asad Abdul-Khaliq (Dan Nystrom kick), 1:25. Minnesota 35–31. Drive: 8 plays, 80 yards, 4:04.

Fourth quarter

- MIN – Asad Abdul-Khaliq 3-yard TD run (Dan Nystrom kick), 8:10. Minnesota 42–31. Drive: 16 plays, 71 yards, 7:38.

Top passers

- MIN – Asad Abdul-Khaliq – 17/25, 265 yards, 3 TD, INT
- WIS – Brooks Bollinger – 17/37, 238 yards, INT

Top rushers

- MIN – Tellis Redmon – 18 rushes, 128 yards
- WIS – Anthony Davis – 29 rushes, 208 yards, 3 TD

Top receivers

- MIN – Ben Utecht – 3 receptions, 104 yards, 2 TD
- WIS – Lee Evans – 9 receptions, 151 yards

Top defenders

- MIN – Jack Brewer – 10 tackles
- WIS – Nick Greisen – 18 tackles, 3 TFL, sack

== Personnel ==
=== Roster ===
2001 Wisconsin Badgers football team roster
Players
Coaches
Offense

Pos.	#	Name	Class
TE	81	Mark Anelli (C)	Sr
G	58	Kalvin Barrett	Fr
TE	88	Mark Bell	Fr
FB/LB	49	Matt Bernstein	Fr
FB	39	Erik Bickerstaff	Jr
QB	5	Brooks Bollinger (C)	Jr
WR	84	David Braun	Jr
WR	1	Byron Brown	So
G	67	Dan Buenning	Fr
WR	87	Darrin Charles	Fr
G	50	Jonathan Clinkscale	Fr
QB	11	Owen Daniels	Fr
RB	28	Anthony Davis	Fr
WR	22	Nick Davis	Sr
TE	86	Bob Docherty	Fr
WR	6	Pat Ellestad	Fr
WR	3	Lee Evans	Jr
C	72	Al Johnson	Jr
OT	64	Ben Johnson	Jr
OT	56	Jason Jowers	Jr
FB	41	Chad Kuhns (C)	Sr
FB	37	Russ Kuhns	Jr
TE	32	Matt Mialik	So
WR	9	Jonathan Orr	Fr
TE	85	Tony Paciotti	Fr
RB	20	Jerrone Pettus	Fr
TE	48	Jason Pociask	Fr
G	53	Donovan Raiola	Fr
QB	16	Matt Schabert	Fr
QB	19	Jim Sorgi	So
WR	12	Stephon Watson	Jr
QB	7	Scott Wille	So
RB	27	Broderick Williams	So
OT	78	Jake Wood	Fr

Defense

Pos.	#	Name	Class
S	9	Ryan Aiello	So
CB	13	Brett Bell	Fr
S	6	Joey Boese	Sr
LB	26	Howard Boye-Doe	Fr
S	12	Robert Brooks	Fr
S	8	Michael Broussard	So
DT	77	Wendell Bryant (C)	Sr
S	10	Chris Catalano	Fr
NT	97	Nick Cochart	So
LB	52	Mark Downing	Sr
CB	36	Mike Echols (C)	Sr
LB	45	Nick Greisen (C)	Sr
DT	94	Anttaj Hawthorne	Fr
NT	42	Ben Herbert	Sr
DE	90	Erasmus James	So
DT	74	Jason Jefferson	Fr
DE	98	Darius Jones (injured)	So
S	18	Jim Leonhard	Fr
LB	46	Jeff Mack	So
DT	89	Jesse Mayfield	So
DE	43	Delante McGrew	Sr
LB	21	Jason Schick	Sr
DB	15	Ryan Simmons	Jr
DT	93	Chuck Smith	Sr
DT	99	Jake Sprague (injured)	Sr
CB	2	Scott Starks	Fr
LB	32	Bryson Thompson	Sr
LB	34	Kareem Timbers	Fr
CB	23	B. J. Tucker	Jr
DE	92	Jonathan Welsh	Fr

Special teams

Pos.	#	Name	Class
K	97	Mike Allen	So
LS	86	Matt Katula	Fr
P	19	R. J. Morse	So
P	25	Kirk Munden	So
K	98	Mark Neuser	So

Head coach

- Barry Alvarez

Coordinators/assistant coaches

- Brian White – Offensive Coordinator/Running Backs
- Kevin Cosgrove – Defensive Coordinator/Inside Linebackers
- Todd Bradford – Defensive Backs
- Tim Davis – Tight Ends
- Jeff Horton – Quarterbacks
- Jim Hueber – Offensive Line and Run Game Coordinator
- Henry Mason – Wide Receivers
- John Palermo – Assistant Head Coach/Defensive Line
- Darrell Wilson – Outside Linebackers/Special Teams

Legend

- (C) Team captain
- (S) Suspended
- (I) Ineligible
- Injured
- Redshirt

Roster

=== Regular starters ===
Position	Player
Quarterback	Brooks Bollinger/Jim Sorgi
Running back	Anthony Davis
Fullback	Chad Kuhns
Wide receiver	Lee Evans
Wide receiver	Nick Davis
Tight end	Mark Anelli
Left tackle	Ben Johnson
Left guard	Dan Buenning
Center	Al Johnson
Right guard	Kalvin Barrett / Jonathan Clinkscale
Right tackle	Jason Jowers

Position	Player
Defensive tackle	Chuck Smith
Nose tackle	Ben Herbert
Defensive tackle	Wendell Bryant
Rush end	Delante McGrew
Outside linebacker	Jeff Mack
Inside linebacker	Bryson Thompson
Outside linebacker	Nick Greisen
Cornerback	Mike Echols
Free safety	Joey Boese
Strong safety	Michael Broussard
Cornerback	Scott Starks

== 2002 NFL draft ==
Player	Position	Round	Pick	NFL club
Wendell Bryant	Defensive Tackle	1	12	Arizona Cardinals
Mike Echols	Cornerback	4	110	Tennessee Titans
Nick Greisen	Linebacker	5	152	New York Giants
Mark Anelli	Tight End	6	201	San Francisco 49ers
