= 2000 Wisconsin Badgers football team =

American college football season

2000 Wisconsin Badgers football

Sun Bowl champion

Sun Bowl, W 21–20 vs. UCLA
- Conference: Big Ten Conference

Ranking
- Coaches: No. 24
- AP: No. 23
- Record: 9–4 (4–4 Big Ten)
- Head coach: Barry Alvarez (11th season)
- Offensive coordinator: Brian White (2nd season)
- Offensive scheme: Multiple
- Defensive coordinator: Kevin Cosgrove (6th season)
- Base defense: 4–3
- Captains: Chris Chambers; Jason Doering; John Favret; Casey Rabach
- Home stadium: Camp Randall Stadium

2000 Big Ten Conference football standings
	Conf.			Overall
Team	W		L	W		L
No. 11 Michigan +	6	–	2	9	–	3
Northwestern +	6	–	2	8	–	4
No. 13 Purdue $+	6	–	2	8	–	4
Ohio State	5	–	3	8	–	4
No. 23 Wisconsin	4	–	4	9	–	4
Minnesota	4	–	4	6	–	6
Penn State	4	–	4	5	–	7
Iowa	3	–	5	3	–	9
Illinois	2	–	6	5	–	6
Michigan State	2	–	6	5	–	6
Indiana	2	–	6	3	–	8
$ – BCS representative as conference champion; + – Conference co-champions; Rankings from AP Poll

The 2000 Wisconsin Badgers football team was an American football team that represented the University of Wisconsin–Madison as a member of the Big Ten Conference during the 2000 NCAA Division I-A football season. In their 11th year under head coach Barry Alvarez, the Badgers compiled a 9–4 record (4–4 in conference games), finished in a three-way tie for fifth in the Big Ten, and outscored opponents by a total of 328 to 265. Against ranked opponents, they lost to No. 9 Michigan, No. 8 Ohio State, and No. 17 Purdue. They concluded the season with a 21–20 victory over unranked UCLAin the Sun Bowl. The Badger were ranked No. 23 in the final AP poll.

The team's statistical leaders included running back Michael Bennett (1,681 rushing yards, 11 touchdowns), quarterback Brooks Bollinger (1,479 passing yards, 121.17 passer rating), wide receiver Chris Chambers (52 catches, 813 yards), kicker Vital Pisetsky (70 points scored), and linebacker Nick Greisen (90 solo tackles, 146 total tackles). Cornerback Jamar Fletcher tallied seven interceptions and 14 pass breakups, won the Jim Thorpe Award, and was a consensus first-team All-American. Punter Kevin Stemke punted 69 times for an average of 44.49 yards and won the Ray Guy Award as the most outstanding punter in college football.

The team played its home games at Camp Randall Stadium in Madison, Wisconsin.

== Schedule ==
Date	Time	Opponent	Rank	Site	TV	Result	Attendance	Source
August 31	7:00 p.m.	Western Michigan*	No. 4	Camp Randall Stadium; Madison, WI	ESPN Plus	W 19–7	77,843	
September 9	2:30 p.m.	Oregon*	No. 5	Camp Randall Stadium; Madison, WI	ABC	W 27–23	78,521	
September 16	1:00 p.m.	Cincinnati*	No. 4	Camp Randall Stadium; Madison, WI		W 28–25 ^{OT}	78,749	
September 23	11:00 a.m.	Northwestern	No. 7	Camp Randall Stadium; Madison, WI	ESPN Plus	L 44–47 ^{2OT}	78,597	
September 30	11:00 a.m.	at No. 9 Michigan	No. 17	Michigan Stadium; Ann Arbor, MI (College GameDay)	ABC	L 10–13	111,341	
October 7	2:30 p.m.	No. 8 Ohio State	No. 24	Camp Randall Stadium; Madison, WI	ABC	L 7–23	79,045	
October 14	11:00 a.m.	at Michigan State		Spartan Stadium; East Lansing, MI	ESPN Plus	W 17–10	74,863	
October 21	11:00 a.m.	No. 17 Purdue^{†}		Camp Randall Stadium; Madison, WI	ESPN	L 24–30 ^{OT}	79,048	
October 28	11:00 a.m.	at Iowa		Kinnick Stadium; Iowa City, IA (rivalry)	ESPN Plus	W 13–7	62,560	
November 4	11:00 a.m.	Minnesota		Camp Randall Stadium; Madison, WI (rivalry)	ESPN2	W 41–20	79,171	
November 11	11:00 a.m.	at Indiana		Memorial Stadium; Bloomington, IN	ESPN Plus	W 43–22	30,469	
November 25	10:00 p.m.	at Hawaii*		Aloha Stadium; Halawa, HI	ESPN Plus	W 34–18	41,313	
December 29	1:00 p.m.	vs. UCLA*		Sun Bowl; El Paso, TX (Sun Bowl)	CBS	W 21–20	49,093	
*Non-conference game; ^{†}Homecoming; Rankings from AP Poll released prior to the game; All times are in Central time

== Rankings ==
Ranking movements Legend: ██ Increase in ranking ██ Decrease in ranking — = Not ranked ( ) = First-place votes
	Week																
Poll	Pre	1	2	3	4	5	6	7	8	9	10	11	12	13	14	15	Final
AP	4 (1)	4 (1)	5 (1)	4 (1)	7	17	24	—	—	—	—	—	—	—	—	—	23
Coaches Poll	5 (1)	5 (1)	6 (1)	5 (1)	6	14	22	—	—	—	—	—	—	—	—	—	24
BCS	Not released									—	—	—	—	—	—	—	Not released

== Personnel ==
=== Roster ===
2000 Wisconsin Badgers football team roster
Players
Coaches
Offense

Pos.	#	Name	Class
TE	81	Mark Anelli	Jr
RB	29	Michael Bennett	Jr
FB	31	Erik Bickerstaff	So
QB	5	Brooks Bollinger	So
WR	84	David Braun	So
RB	34	Michael Broussard	Fr
G	67	Dan Buenning	Fr
WR	88	Chris Chambers (C)	Sr
OT	54	Dave Costa	Sr
WR	22	Nick Davis	Jr
G	69	Jeremy Dox	Jr
WR	3	Lee Evans	So
RB	4	Eddie Faulkner	Fr
G	60	Bill Ferrario	Sr
WR	23	Josh Hunt	Jr
OT	76	Josh Jakubowski	Sr
C	72	Al Johnson	So
OT	64	Ben Johnson	So
C, G	56	Jason Jowers	So
FB	41	Chad Kuhns	Jr
OT	71	Brian Lamont	Jr
C	70	Casey Rabach (C)	Jr
TE	87	Dague Retzlaff	Sr
TE	85	John Sigmund	Sr
QB	19	Jim Sorgi	Fr
RB	38	Matt Unertl	Sr
WR	9	Conroy White	Jr
RB	27	Broderick Williams	Fr

Defense

Pos.	#	Name	Class
S	7	Ryan Aiello	Fr
S	6	Joey Boese	Jr
DT	77	Wendell Bryant	Jr
CB	10	Bret Burlingame	Sr
S	31	Carlease Clark	Jr
S	8	Jason Doering (C)	Sr
LB	52	Mark Downing	Jr
CB	36	Mike Echols	Jr
DE	96	John Favret (C)	Sr
CB	2	Jamar Fletcher	Sr
LB	45	Nick Greisen	Jr
DT	90	Aaron Habermann	Jr
DE	42	Ben Herbert	Jr
S	11	Devery Hughes	So
LB	48	Darius Jones	Fr
LB	19	Roger Knight	Sr
DT	78	Ross Kolodziej	Sr
LB	50	Russ Kuhns	So
LB	46	Jeff Mack	Fr
NT	98	Eric Mahlik	Sr
LB	30	Ryan Marks	Sr
DE	43	Delante McGrew	Jr
DL	65	Nick Mueller	Jr
S	21	Jason Schick	Fr
DB	27	Ryan Simmons	So
DT	93	Chuck Smith	Jr
NT	99	Jake Sprague	Jr
LB	32	Bryson Thompson	Jr
CB	23	B. J. Tucker	So
DB	13	Chris Wagner	Fr

Special teams

Pos.	#	Name	Class
K	20	Vitaly Pisetsky	Sr
LS	86	Mike Solwold	Sr
P	14	Kevin Stemke	Sr

Head coach

- Barry Alvarez

Coordinators/assistant coaches

- Brian White – Offensive Coordinator/Running Backs
- Kevin Cosgrove – Defensive Coordinator/Inside Linebackers
- Todd Bradford – Defensive Backs
- Tim Davis – Tight Ends
- Jeff Horton – Quarterbacks
- Jim Hueber – Offensive Line and Run Game Coordinator
- Henry Mason – Wide Receivers
- John Palermo – Assistant Head Coach/Defensive Line
- Darrell Wilson – Outside Linebackers/Special Teams

Legend

- (C) Team captain
- (S) Suspended
- (I) Ineligible
- Injured
- Redshirt

=== Regular starters ===
Position	Player
Quarterback	Brooks Bollinger
Running back	Michael Bennett
Fullback	Mark Anelli
Wide receiver	Lee Evans
Wide receiver	Chris Chambers
Tight end	John Sigmund
Left tackle	Ben Johnson
Left guard	Bill Ferrario
Center	Al Johnson
Right guard	Casey Rabach
Right tackle	Brian Lamont

Position	Player
Defensive tackle	Ross Kolodziej
Nose tackle	Eric Mahlik
Defensive tackle	Wendell Bryant
Rush end	John Favret
Outside linebacker	Roger Knight
Inside linebacker	Nick Greisen
Outside linebacker	Jeff Mack
Cornerback	Jamar Fletcher
Free safety	Jason Doering
Strong safety	Joey Boese
Cornerback	Mike Echols

== Statistical achievements ==
The Badgers outscored opponents by a total of 328 (25.23 points per game) to 265 (20.38 points per game). The Badgers gained an average of 358.8 yards of total offense per game, consisting of 196.1 rushing yards and 162.77 passing yards per game. On defense, they gave up 392.1 yards of total offense per game, consisting of 150.6 rushing yards and 241.46 passing yards per game.

Michael Bennett led the team in rushing with 1,681 yards on 310 carries, an average of 152.82 yards per game and 5.4 yards per carry. He also led the team with 11 touchdowns.

Quarterback Brooks Bollinger completed 110 of 209 passes (52.63%) for 1,479 yards, 10 touchdowns, seven interceptions, and a 121.17 passer rating.

Wide receiver Chris Chambers led the team with 52 receptions for 813 yards, an average of 90.33 yards per game and 15.63 yards per reception.

Kicker Vital Pisetsky led the team in scoring with 70 points. He converted 13 of 22 field goals and 31 of 32 extra points.

The team's defensive leaders included Nick Greisen (90 solo tackles, 146 total tackles, six sacks, 14 tackles for loss), Wendell Bryant (six sacks), Jamar Fletcher (seven interceptions), and Mike Echols (19 pass breakups).

== Awards and records ==
Cornerback Jamar Fletcher tallied seven interceptions and 14 pass breakups, won the Jim Thorpe Award as the best defensive back in college football, and was named the Big Ten Defensive Player of the Year He was a consensus All-American, receiving first-team honors from, among others, the Associated Press (AP), Football Writers Association of America (FWAA), American Football Coaches Association (AFCA), Pro Football Weekly, Football News, CNNSI, and Rivals.

Punter Kevin Stemke punted 69 times for an average of 44.49 yards. He and won the inaugural Ray Guy Award as the most outstanding punter in college football. He was also selected as a first-team All-American by CNNSI.

Offensive guard Bill Ferrario was selected as a first-team All-American by Pro Football Weekly.

Nine Wisconsin players received recognition on the 2000 All-Big Ten Conference football team: Fletcher (Coaches-1, Media-1); Stemke (Coaches-1, Media-1); offensive guard Casey Rabach (Coaches-1, Media-1); defensive lineman Wendell Bryant (Coaches-1, Media-2); linebacker Nick Greisen (Media-1); Ferrario (Coaches-2, Media-2); running back Michael Bennett (Coaches-2, Media-2); and defensive back Mike Echols (Coaches-2, Media-2); and wide receiver Chris Chambers (Coaches-2).

== 2001 NFL draft ==
Player	Position	Round	Pick	NFL club
Jamar Fletcher	Cornerback	1	26	Miami Dolphins
Michael Bennett	Running back	1	27	Minnesota Vikings
Chris Chambers	Wide receiver	2	52	Miami Dolphins
Casey Rabach	Center	3	92	Baltimore Ravens
Bill Ferrario	Guard	4	105	Green Bay Packers
Roger Knight	Linebacker	6	182	Pittsburgh Steelers
Jason Doering	Defensive back	6	193	Indianapolis Colts
Ross Kolodziej	Defensive end	7	230	New York Giants
