= Wisconsin Badgers football statistical leaders =

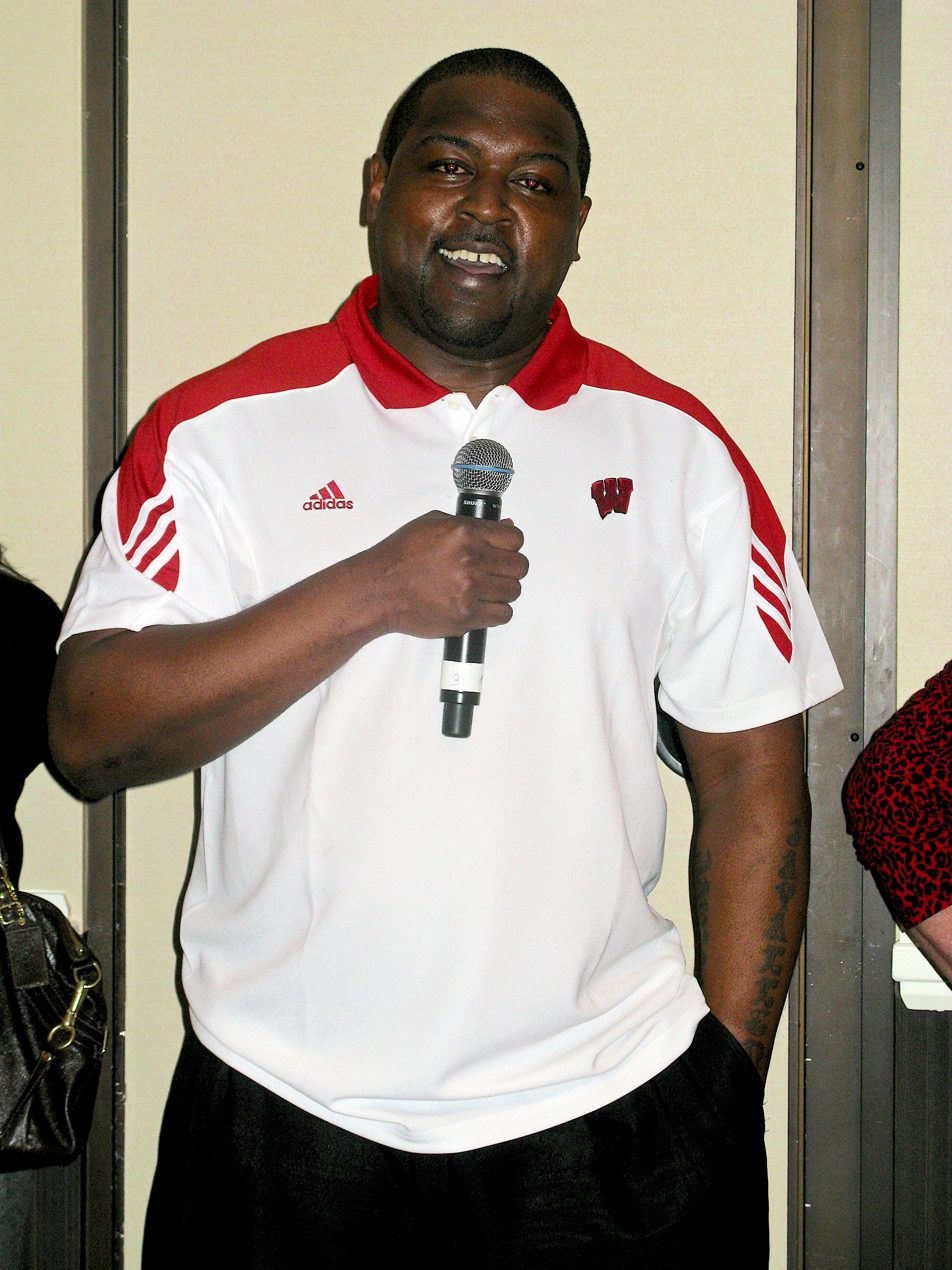
Ron Dayne not only holds the Wisconsin rushing yards record, but the entire NCAA rushing yards record.

The Wisconsin Badgers football statistical leaders are individual statistical leaders of the Wisconsin Badgers football program in various categories, including passing, rushing, receiving, total offense, defensive stats, and kicking. Within those areas, the lists identify single-game, single-season, and career leaders. The Badgers represent the University of Wisconsin–Madison in the NCAA's Big Ten Conference.

Although Wisconsin began competing in intercollegiate football in 1889, the school's official record book considers the "modern era" to have begun in 1946. Records from before this year are often incomplete and inconsistent, and they are generally not included in these lists.

These lists are dominated by more recent players for several reasons:

- Since 1946, seasons have increased from 10 games to 11 and then 12 games in length.
- The NCAA didn't allow freshmen to play varsity football until 1972 (with the exception of the World War II years), allowing players to have four-year careers.
- Bowl games only began counting toward single-season and career statistics in 2002. The Badgers have reached a bowl game every year since then, giving recent players an extra game each year to accumulate statistics.
- Similarly, the Badgers have played in the Big Ten Football Championship Game five times since its establishment in 2011.

These lists are updated through the 2025 season.

== Passing ==
=== Passing yards ===
Career
Rank	Player	Yards	Years
1	Darrell Bevell	7,686	1992 1993 1994 1995
2	Joel Stave	7,635	2012 2013 2014 2015
3	John Stocco	7,227	2003 2004 2005 2006
4	Brooks Bollinger	5,627	1999 2000 2001 2002
5	Alex Hornibrook	5,438	2016 2017 2018
6	Graham Mertz	5,405	2019 2020 2021 2022
7	Scott Tolzien	5,271	2008 2009 2010 2011
8	Randy Wright	5,003	1981 1982 1983
9	Mike Samuel	4,989	1995 1996 1997 1998
10	Jim Sorgi	4,498	2000 2001 2002 2003

Single season
Rank	Player	Yards	Year
1	Russell Wilson	3,175	2011
2	John Stocco	2,920	2005
3	Jack Coan	2,725	2019
4	Scott Tolzien	2,705	2009
5	Joel Stave	2,687	2015
6	Alex Hornibrook	2,644	2017
7	Tyler Donovan	2,607	2007
8	Joel Stave	2,494	2013
9	Scott Tolzien	2,459	2010
10	Darrell Bevell	2,390	1993

Single game
Rank	Player	Yards	Year	Opponent
1	Darrell Bevell	423	1993	Minnesota
2	Ron Vander Kelen	401	1962	USC (Rose Bowl)
3	Tyler Donovan	392	2007	Illinois
4	Jim Sorgi	380	2003	Michigan State
5	Tanner Mordecai	378	2023	LSU
6	Jack Coan	363	2019	Central Michigan
7	Colton Joseph	362	2026	Eastern Michigan
8	Braedyn Locke	359	2024	Purdue
9	Tony Lowery	355	1990	Northwestern
10	Darrell Bevell	352	1995	Iowa

=== Passing completion percentage ===
Career (Minimum 300 attempts)
Rank	Player	Percentage	Years
1	Russell Wilson	72.8%	2011
2	Scott Tolzien	68.1%	2008 2009 2010
3	Jack Coan	68.0%	2017 2018 2019
4	Darrell Bevell	61.4%	1992 1993 1994 1995
5	Alex Hornibrook	60.5%	2016 2017 2018
6	Graham Mertz	59.5%	2019 2020 2021 2022
	Joel Stave	59.5%	2012 2013 2014 2015
8	Tyler Donovan	58.8%	2004 2005 2006 2007
9	John Stocco	57.2%	2003 2004 2005 2006
10	Mike Howard	56.1%	1983 1984 1985 1986

Single season (Minimum 100 attempts)
Rank	Player	Percentage	Year
1	Scott Tolzien	72.9%	2010
2	Russell Wilson	72.8%	2011
3	Jack Coan	69.6%	2019
4	Darrell Bevell	67.8%	1993
5	Bart Houston	65.1%	2016
6	Darrell Bevell	65.0%	1995
	Tanner Mordecai	65.0%	2023
8	Scott Tolzien	64.3%	2009
9	Alex Hornibrook	62.3%	2017
10	Joel Stave	61.9%	2013

Single game (Minimum 10 attempts)
Rank	Player	Percentage	Year	Opponent
1	Graham Mertz	95.2%	2020	Illinois
2	Alex Hornibrook	94.7%	2017	BYU
3	Darrell Bevell	94.4%	1993	Northwestern
4	Russell Wilson	94.1%	2011	Minnesota
5	Scott Tolzien	93.3%	2010	Michigan
6	Mike Samuel	92.3%	1997	San Diego State
7	Bart Houston	91.7%	2016	Western Michigan (Cotton Bowl)
8	Darrell Bevell	90.0%	1995	SMU
9	Brooks Bollinger	90.0%	1999	Indiana
10	John Stocco	88.2%	2006	Indiana

=== Passing touchdowns ===
Career
Rank	Player	TDs	Years
1	Darrell Bevell	59	1992 1993 1994 1995
2	Joel Stave	48	2012 2013 2014 2015
3	John Stocco	47	2003 2004 2005 2006
	Alex Hornibrook	47	2016 2017 2018
5	Randy Wright	38	1981 1982 1983
	Brooks Bollinger	38	1999 2000 2001 2002
	Graham Mertz	38	2019 2020 2021 2022
8	Jim Sorgi	33	2000 2001 2002 2003
	Russell Wilson	33	2011
10	Scott Tolzien	32	2008 2009 2010

Single season
Rank	Player	TDs	Year
1	Russell Wilson	33	2011
2	Alex Hornibrook	25	2017
3	Joel Stave	22	2013
4	John Stocco	21	2005
5	Randy Wright	19	1983
	Darrell Bevell	19	1993
	Graham Mertz	19	2022
8	Jack Coan	18	2019
9	John Stocco	17	2006
	Darrell Bevell	17	1994
	Jim Sorgi	17	2003
	Tyler Donovan	17	2007

Single game
Rank	Player	TDs	Year	Opponent
1	Darrell Bevell	5	1993	Nevada
	Jim Sorgi	5	2003	Michigan State
	Graham Mertz	5	2020	Illinois
	Graham Mertz	5	2022	Northwestern
5	13 times by nine players	4	Most recent: Alex Hornibrook vs. Miami, 2017	

== Rushing ==
=== Rushing yards ===
Career
Rank	Player	Yards	Years
1	Ron Dayne	7,125	1996 1997 1998 1999
2	Jonathan Taylor	6,174	2017 2018 2019
3	Montee Ball	5,140	2009 2010 2011 2012
4	Melvin Gordon	4,915	2011 2012 2013 2014
5	Anthony Davis	4,676	2001 2002 2003 2004
6	James White	4,015	2010 2011 2012 2013
7	P.J. Hill	3,942	2006 2007 2008
8	Billy Marek	3,709	1972 1973 1974 1975
9	Braelon Allen	3,494	2021 2022 2023
10	Brent Moss	3,428	1991 1992 1993 1994

Single season
Rank	Player	Yards	Year
1	Melvin Gordon	2,587	2014
2	Jonathan Taylor	2,194	2018
3	Ron Dayne	2,109	1996
4	Ron Dayne	2,034	1999
5	Jonathan Taylor	2,003	2019
6	Jonathan Taylor	1,977	2017
7	Montee Ball	1,923	2011
8	Montee Ball	1,830	2012
9	Michael Bennett	1,681	2000
10	Brent Moss	1,637	1993

Single game
Rank	Player	Yards	Year	Opponent
1	Melvin Gordon	408	2014	Nebraska
2	Ron Dayne	339	1996	Hawaii
3	Jonathan Taylor	321	2018	Purdue
4	Billy Marek	304	1974	Minnesota
5	Anthony Davis	301	2002	Minnesota
6	Ron Dayne	297	1996	Minnesota
7	Michael Bennett	293	2000	Northwestern
8	Michael Bennett	290	2000	Oregon
9	Ron Dayne	289	1996	Illinois
10	Melvin Gordon	259	2014	Northwestern

=== Rushing touchdowns ===
Career
Rank	Player	TDs	Years
1	Montee Ball	77	2009 2010 2011 2012
2	Ron Dayne	71	1996 1997 1998 1999
3	Jonathan Taylor	50	2017 2018 2019
4	James White	45	2010 2011 2012 2013
	Melvin Gordon	45	2011 2012 2013 2014
6	Billy Marek	44	1972 1973 1974 1975
7	Anthony Davis	42	2001 2002 2003 2004
	P.J. Hill	42	2006 2007 2008
9	John Clay	41	2008 2009 2010
10	Corey Clement	36	2013 2014 2015 2016

Single season
Rank	Player	TDs	Year
1	Montee Ball	33	2011
2	Melvin Gordon	29	2014
3	Brian Calhoun	22	2005
4	Montee Ball	22	2012
5	Ron Dayne	21	1996
	Jonathan Taylor	21	2019
7	Ron Dayne	20	1999
8	Billy Marek	18	1974
	John Clay	18	2009
	Montee Ball	18	2010

Single game
Rank	Player	TDs	Year	Opponent
1	Billy Marek	5	1974	Minnesota
	Anthony Davis	5	2002	Minnesota
	Brian Calhoun	5	2005	Bowling Green
	Brian Calhoun	5	2005	Illinois
	Melvin Gordon	5	2014	Bowling Green
6	18 times by 9 players	4	Most recent: Jonathan Taylor vs. Kent State, 2019	

== Receiving ==
=== Receptions ===
Career
Rank	Player	Rec	Years
1	Brandon Williams	202	2002 2003 2004 2005
	Jared Abbrederis	202	2010 2011 2012 2013
3	Lee Evans	175	1999 2000 2001 2003
4	Nick Toon	171	2008 2009 2010 2011
5	Travis Beckum	159	2006 2007 2008
6	Jake Ferguson	145	2018 2019 2020 2021
7	Alex Erickson	141	2013 2014 2015
8	Troy Fumagalli	135	2014 2015 2016 2017
9	Al Toon	131	1982 1983 1984
	Danny Davis III	131	2017 2018 2019 2020 2021

Single season
Rank	Player	Rec	Year
1	Jared Abbrederis	78	2013
2	Alex Erickson	77	2015
3	Lee Evans	75	2001
	Travis Beckum	75	2007
5	Will Pauling	74	2023
6	Lee Evans	64	2003
	Nick Toon	64	2011
8	Travis Beckum	61	2006
9	Brandon Williams	59	2005
	Quintez Cephus	59	2019

Single game
Rank	Player	Rec	Year	Opponent
1	Tyrell Henry	14	2026	Eastern Michigan
2	Matt Nyquist	13	1995	Iowa
3	Jared Abbrederis	12	2013	Penn State
4	Pat Richter	11	1962	USC (Rose Bowl)
	Jimmy Jones	11	1964	Northwestern
	Louis Jung	11	1965	Colorado
	Chris Chambers	11	2000	Purdue
	Chris Chambers	11	2000	Iowa
	Brian Calhoun	11	2005	Northwestern
	Travis Beckum	11	2007	Illinois

=== Receiving yards ===
Career
Rank	Player	Yards	Years
1	Lee Evans	3,468	1999 2000 2001 2003
2	Jared Abbrederis	3,140	2010 2011 2012 2013
3	Brandon Williams	2,924	2002 2003 2004 2005
4	Nick Toon	2,447	2008 2009 2010 2011
5	Travis Beckum	2,149	2006 2007 2008
6	Al Toon	2,103	1982 1983 1984
7	Chris Chambers	2,004	1997 1998 1999 2000
8	Tony Simmons	1,991	1994 1995 1996 1997
9	Lee DeRamus	1,974	1991 1992 1993
10	Alex Erickson	1,877	2013 2014 2015

Single season
Rank	Player	Yards	Year
1	Lee Evans	1,545	2001
2	Lee Evans	1,213	2003
3	Brandon Williams	1,095	2005
4	Jared Abbrederis	1,081	2013
5	Travis Beckum	982	2007
6	Alex Erickson	978	2015
7	Jared Abbrederis	933	2011
8	Nick Toon	926	2011
9	Lee DeRamus	920	1993
10	Travis Beckum	903	2006

Single game
Rank	Player	Yards	Year	Opponent
1	Lee Evans	258	2003	Michigan State
2	Al Toon	252	1983	Purdue
3	Lee Evans	228	2001	Michigan State
4	Lee Evans	214	2003	Akron
5	Jared Abbrederis	207	2013	Ohio State
6	Tim Ware	193	1990	Northwestern
7	Chris Chambers	191	2000	Iowa
8	Chimere Dike	185	2022	Northwestern
9	Lee Evans	182	2001	Fresno State
10	Lee Evans	175	2001	Iowa

=== Receiving touchdowns ===
Career
Rank	Player	TDs	Years
1	Lee Evans	27	1999 2000 2001 2003
2	Tony Simmons	23	1994 1995 1996 1997
3	Jared Abbrederis	23	2010 2011 2012 2013
4	Al Toon	19	1982 1983 1984
	Jonathan Orr	19	2002 2003 2004 2005
6	Nick Toon	18	2008 2009 2010 2011
7	Jacob Pedersen	17	2010 2011 2012 2013
8	Chris Chambers	16	1997 1998 1999 2000
	Garrett Graham	16	2006 2007 2008 2009
10	Pat Richter	15	1960 1961 1962
	Lee DeRamus	15	1991 1992 1993

Single season
Rank	Player	TDs	Year
1	Lee Evans	13	2003
2	Nick Toon	10	2011
3	Al Toon	9	1983
	Lee Evans	9	2001
5	Pat Richter	8	1961
	Tony Simmons	8	1994
	Jonathan Orr	8	2002
	Jonathan Orr	8	2005
	Jared Abbrederis	8	2011
	Jacob Pedersen	8	2011

Single game
Rank	Player	TDs	Year	Opponent
1	Lee Evans	5	2003	Michigan State
2	Jonathan Orr	4	2005	Northwestern
3	Dave Howard	3	1955	Iowa
	Pat Richter	3	1961	Illinois
	Lee Evans	3	2001	Michigan State
	Owen Daniels	3	2005	Temple
	Garrett Graham	3	2009	Michigan State
	Danny Davis	3	2017	Miami (Orange Bowl)
	Jake Ferguson	3	2020	Illinois
	Chimere Dike	3	2022	Northwestern

== Total offense ==
Total offense is the sum of passing and rushing statistics. It does not include receiving or returns.

=== Total offense yards ===
Career
Rank	Player	Yards	Years
1	Darrell Bevell	7,477	1992 1993 1994 1995
2	Brooks Bollinger	7,394	1999 2000 2001 2002
3	Joel Stave	7,369	2012 2013 2014 2015
4	Ron Dayne	7,125	1996 1997 1998 1999
5	John Stocco	7,083	2003 2004 2005 2006
6	Jonathan Taylor	6,174	2017 2018 2019
7	Mike Samuel	5,750	1995 1996 1997 1998
8	Graham Mertz	5,384	2019 2020 2021 2022
9	Randy Wright	5,350	1981 1982 1983
10	Scott Tolzien	5,262	2008 2009 2010 2011

Single season
Rank	Player	Yards	Year
1	Russell Wilson	3,513	2011
2	John Stocco	2,888	2005
3	Jack Coan	2,747	2019
4	Scott Tolzien	2,713	2009
5	Tyler Donovan	2,607	2007
6	Melvin Gordon	2,587	2014
7	Joel Stave	2,564	2015
8	Alex Hornibrook	2,543	2017
9	Randy Wright	2,481	1982
10	Joel Stave	2,472	2013

Single game
Rank	Player	Yards	Year	Opponent
1	Tyler Donovan	419	2007	Illinois
2	Darrell Bevell	416	1993	Minnesota
3	Melvin Gordon	408	2014	Nebraska
	Colton Joseph	408	2026	Eastern Michigan
5	Ron Vander Kelen	406	1962	USC (Rose Bowl)
6	Tony Lowery	395	1990	Northwestern
7	Russell Wilson	384	2011	Northern Illinois
8	Tanner Mordecai	375	2023	LSU
9	Jim Sorgi	367	2003	Michigan State
10	Jack Coan	363	2019	Central Michigan

=== All-purpose yards ===
Career
Rank	Player	Yards	Years
1	Ron Dayne	7,429	1996 1997 1998 1999
2	Jonathan Taylor	6,581	2017 2018 2019
3	Brandon Williams	5,852	2002 2003 2004 2005
4	Montee Ball	5,738	2009 2010 2011 2012
5	James White	5,450	2010 2011 2012 2013
6	Melvin Gordon	5,317	2011 2012 2013 2014
7	David Gilreath	5,265	2007 2008 2009 2010
8	Anthony Davis	4,874	2001 2002 2003 2004
9	Jared Abbrederis	4,818	2010 2011 2012 2013
10	Terrell Fletcher	4,322	1991 1992 1993 1994

Single season
Rank	Player	Yards	Year
1	Melvin Gordon	2,740	2014
2	Jonathan Taylor	2,255	2019
3	Jonathan Taylor	2,254	2018
4	Ron Dayne	2,242	1996
5	Montee Ball	2,229	2011
6	Brian Calhoun	2,207	2005
7	Brandon Williams	2,138	2005
8	Jonathan Taylor	2,072	2017
9	Ron Dayne	2,043	1999
10	Jared Abbrederis	1,999	2011

Single game
Rank	Player	Yards	Year	Opponent
1	Melvin Gordon	408	2014	Nebraska
2	Ron Dayne	347	1996	Hawaii
3	Jared Abbrederis	346	2011	Oregon (Rose Bowl)
4	Michael Bennett	336	2000	Oregon
5	Jonathan Taylor	321	2018	Purdue
6	Michael Bennett	320	2000	Northwestern
7	Ira Matthews	312	1978	Minnesota
8	Billy Marek	304	1974	Minnesota
	Ron Dayne	304	1996	Minnesota
10	Anthony Davis	301	2002	Minnesota

=== Total touchdowns responsible for ===
Career
Rank	Player	TDs	Years
1	Montee Ball	84	2009 2010 2011 2012
2	Ron Dayne	71	1996 1997 1998 1999
3	Brooks Bollinger	64	1999 2000 2001 2002
4	Darrell Bevell	62	1992 1993 1994 1995
5	Jonathan Taylor	55	2017 2018 2019
6	John Stocco	54	2003 2004 2005 2006
7	Joel Stave	50	2012 2013 2014 2015
8	James White	49	2010 2011 2012 2013
	Melvin Gordon	49	2011 2012 2013 2014
10	Mike Samuel	47	1995 1996 1997 1998
	Alex Hornibrook	47	2016 2017 2018

Single season
Rank	Player	TDs	Year
1	Montee Ball	40	2011
	Russell Wilson	40	2011
3	Melvin Gordon	32	2014
4	Jonathan Taylor	26	2019
5	Randy Wright	25	1983
	Alex Hornibrook	25	2017
7	Brian Calhoun	24	2005
8	John Stocco	23	2005
	Joel Stave	23	2013
10	Tyler Donovan	22	2007
	Brooks Bollinger	22	2002
	Montee Ball	22	2012
	Jack Coan	22	2019

== Defense ==
=== Interceptions ===
Career
Rank	Player	Ints	Years
1	Jamar Fletcher	21	1998 1999 2000
	Jim Leonhard	21	2001 2002 2003 2004
3	Neovia Greyer	18	1969 1970 1971
	Jeff Messenger	18	1991 1992 1993 1994
5	Scott Nelson	14	1990 1991 1992 1993
6	Mike Echols	12	1998 1999 2000 2001
7	David Greenwood	10	1979 1980 1981 1982
	T. J. Edwards	10	2015 2016 2017 2018
	Ricardo Hallman	10	2021 2022 2023 2024 2025
10	Dave Fronek	9	1963 1964 1965
	Craig Raddatz	9	1983 1984 1985 1986
	Nate Odomes	9	1984 1985 1986
	Eddie Fletcher	9	1988 1989 1990 1991
	Shane Carter	9	2005 2006 2007 2008
	Antonio Fenelus	9	2008 2009 2010 2011
	Sojourn Shelton	9	2013 2014 2015 2016
	John Torchio	9	2019 2020 2021 2022

Single season
Rank	Player	Ints	Year
1	Jim Leonhard	11	2002
2	Neovia Greyer	9	1970
3	Dale Hackbart	7	1958
	Scott Erdmann	7	1976
	Nate Odomes	7	1986
	Jeff Messenger	7	1993
	Jamar Fletcher	7	1998
	Jamar Fletcher	7	1999
	Jamar Fletcher	7	2000
	Jim Leonhard	7	2003
	Shane Carter	7	2007
	Ricardo Hallman	7	2023

Single game
Rank	Player	Ints	Year	Opponent
1	Clarence Bratt	4	1954	Minnesota
2	11 times by 11 players	3	Most recent: Jamar Fletcher vs. Oregon, 2000	

=== Tackles ===
Career
Rank	Player	Tackles	Years
1	Pete Monty	451	1993 1994 1995 1996
2	Gary Casper	447	1989 1990 1991 1992
3	Tim Krumrie	444	1979 1980 1981 1982
4	Dave Lokanc	427	1970 1971 1972
5	Dave Crossen	427	1975 1976 1977 1978
6	Chris Borland	420	2009 2010 2011 2012 2013
7	Jim Melka	399	1981 1982 1983 1984
8	Mike Taylor	377	2009 2010 2011 2012
9	T. J. Edwards	367	2015 2016 2017 2018
10	Ken Criter	364	1966 1967 1968

Single season
Rank	Player	Tackles	Year
1	Dave Lokanc	181	1972
2	Pete Monty	178	1996
3	Dave Crossen	175	1977
4	Ken Criter	169	1967
5	Nick Greisen	167	2001
6	Dave Lokanc	162	1971
7	Michael Reid	156	1986
8	Mike Taylor	150	2011
9	Aaron Norvell	148	1992
10	Nick Greisen	146	2000

Single game
Rank	Player	Tackles	Year	Opponent
1	Dave Crossen	28	1977	Purdue
2	Ken Criter	27	1968	Ohio State
	Dave Lokanc	27	1972	Ohio State
4	Mark Zakula	25	1973	Northwestern
5	Dave Lokanc	24	1971	Indiana
	Dave Crossen	24	1977	Iowa
	David Wings	24	1987	Iowa
8	8 times by 7 players	23	Most recent: Bob Adamov vs. Purdue, 1998	

=== Sacks ===
Career
Rank	Player	Sacks	Years
1	Tarek Saleh	33.0	1993 1994 1995 1996
2	Tom Burke	32.0	1995 1996 1997 1998
3	Mike Thompson	28.0	1991 1992 1993 1994
4	Tim Jordan	27.0	1983 1984 1985 1986
5	Wendell Bryant	24.0	1998 1999 2000 2001
6	John Favret	22.0	1996 1997 1998 1999 2000
7	Don Davey	21.0	1986 1987 1988 1989 1990
	Nick Herbig	21.0	2020 2021 2022
9	Vince Biegel	20.5	2012 2013 2014 2015 2016
10	Erasmus James	18.0	2001 2002 2004

Single season
Rank	Player	Sacks	Year
1	Tom Burke	22.0	1998
2	Tarek Saleh	14.0	1996
3	Zack Baun	12.5	2019
4	Tarek Saleh	12.0	1995
	O'Brien Schofield	12.0	2009
6	Chris Orr	11.5	2019
	TJ Watt	11.5	2016
8	Darryl Sims	11.0	1982
	Tim Jordan	11.0	1985
	Nick Herbig	11.0	2022

Single game
Rank	Player	Sacks	Year	Opponent
1	Tim Jordan	6.0	1985	Northwestern
2	Mike Thompson	5.0	1993	Northwestern
	Tom Burke	5.0	1998	Iowa
	Wendell Bryant	5.0	2001	Penn State
	Alex Lewis	5.0	2003	Purdue

== Kicking ==
=== Field goals made ===
Career
Rank	Player	FGs	Years
1	Rafael Gaglianone	70	2014 2015 2016 2017 2018
2	Todd Gregoire	65	1984 1985 1986 1987
3	Philip Welch	59	2008 2009 2010 2011
4	Rich Thompson	50	1988 1989 1990 1991 1992
	Taylor Mehlhaff	50	2004 2005 2006 2007
6	Mike Allen	41	2001 2002 2003 2004
7	Collin Larsh	34	2019 2020 2021
	Nathanial Vakos	34	2023 2024 2025
9	Matt Davenport	33	1996 1997 1998
10	John Hall	29	1993 1994 1995 1996
	Vitaly Pisetsky	29	1997 1998 1999 2000

Single season
Rank	Player	FGs	Year
1	Rich Thompson	22	1992
2	Taylor Mehlhaff	21	2007
3	Todd Gregoire	20	1984
	Philip Welch	20	2008
5	Matt Davenport	19	1998
	Rafael Gaglianone	19	2014
7	Rafael Gaglianone	18	2015
8	Philip Welch	17	2009
	Philip Welch	17	2010
	Collin Larsh	17	2021

Single game
Rank	Player	FGs	Year	Opponent
1	Vince Lamia	4	1976	Minnesota
	Todd Gregoire	4	1984	Kentucky
	Todd Gregoire	4	1987	Ohio State
	Rich Thompson	4	1992	Bowling Green
	Rich Thompson	4	1992	Purdue
	Matt Davenport	4	1998	Minnesota
	Vitaly Pisetsky	4	1999	Michigan State
	Philip Welch	4	2008	Michigan
9	27 times	3	Most recent: Gavin Lahm vs. Rutgers, 2026	

=== Field goal percentage ===
Career
Rank	Player	FG%	Years
1	Matt Davenport	86.8%	1996 1997 1998
2	Philip Welch	77.6%	2008 2009 2010 2011
3	Taylor Mehlhaff	76.9%	2004 2005 2006 2007
4	Todd Gregoire	76.5%	1984 1985 1986 1987
5	Rafael Gaglianone	76.1%	2014 2015 2016 2017 2018
6	Collin Larsh	72.3%	2019 2020 2021
7	Nathanial Vakos	69.4%	2023 2024 2025
8	Vitaly Pisetsky	69.0%	1997 1998 1999 2000
9	Mike Allen	67.2%	2001 2002 2003 2004
10	Vince Lamia	64.1%	1973 1974 1975 1976

Single season
Rank	Player	FG%	Year
1	Matt Davenport	90.5%	1998
2	Rafael Gaglianone	88.9%	2017
3	Rafael Gaglianone	86.4%	2014
4	Taylor Mehlhaff	84.0%	2007
5	Philip Welch	83.3%	2008
6	Matt Davenport	82.4%	1997
7	Todd Gregoire	80.0%	1987
	Vitaly Pisetsky	80.0%	1999
9	Nathanial Vakos	78.9%	2023
10	Nate Van Zelst	78.6%	2022

=== Extra points made ===
Career
Rank	Player	PATs	Years
1	Rafael Gaglianone	216	2014 2015 2016 2017 2018
2	Philip Welch	207	2008 2009 2010 2011
3	Taylor Mehlhaff	145	2004 2005 2006 2007
4	Collin Larsh	115	2019 2020 2021
5	Vince Lamia	105	1973 1974 1975 1976
6	John Hall	99	1993 1994 1995 1996
7	Mike Allen	97	2001 2002 2003 2004
8	Kyle French	87	2011 2012 2013
9	Nathanial Vakos	84	2023 2024 2025
10	Todd Gregoire	83	1984 1985 1986 1987

Single season
Rank	Player	PATs	Year
1	Philip Welch	67	2010
2	Rafael Gaglianone	59	2014
	Rafael Gaglianone	59	2017
4	Taylor Mehlhaff	56	2005
5	Philip Welch	54	2011
6	Collin Larsh	53	2019
7	Rafael Gaglianone	48	2018
8	Taylor Mehlhaff	47	2006
	Philip Welch	47	2009
10	Vitaly Pisetsky	46	1999

Single game
Rank	Player	PATs	Year	Opponent
1	Philip Welch	11	2010	Indiana
2	Philip Welch	9	2010	Austin Peay
	Nate Van Zelst	9	2022	New Mexico State
3	16 times by 11 players	8	Most recent: Collin Larsh vs. Central Michigan, 2019	
