= 2000 Sun Bowl =

American college football game

2000 Wells Fargo Sun Bowl
UCLA Bruins	Wisconsin Badgers
(6–5)	(8–4)
Pac-10	Big Ten
20	21
Head coach: Bob Toledo	Head coach: Barry Alvarez
	1	2	3	4	Total
UCLA	10	7	3	0	20
Wisconsin	7	0	7	7	21
- Date: December 29, 2000
- Season: 2000
- Stadium: Sun Bowl
- Location: El Paso, Texas
- MVP: Freddie Mitchell (UCLA)
- Referee: Al Ford (SEC)
- Attendance: 49,093
- Payout: US$1,000,000 per team

United States TV coverage
- Network: CBS
- Announcers: Verne Lundquist, Todd Blackledge, and Jill Arrington

The 2000 Wells Fargo Sun Bowl featured the UCLA Bruins and the Wisconsin Badgers.

Wisconsin opened the scoring, after quarterback Brooks Bollinger threw a 54-yard touchdown pass to wide receiver Lee Evans for an early 7–0 lead. UCLA responded when Cory Paus threw a 64-yard touchdown pass to Freddie Mitchell to even the score at 7. UCLA's Chris Griffin added a 31-yard field goal to push UCLA's lead to 10–7.

In the second quarter, running back DeShaun Foster rushed 7 yards for a touchdown, to increase the lead to 17–7. In the third quarter, Chris Griffin kicked his second field goal of the game, a 25 yarder, to move the lead to 20–7. Brooks Bollinger later found wide receiver Chris Chambers for a 3-yard touchdown pass, cutting the lead to 20–14. Michael Bennett's 6-yard touchdown run gave the Badgers a 21–20 lead, and eventually the ball game.
