= 2001 All-Big Ten Conference football team =

Football honors in the 2001 All-Big Ten Conference season

The 2001 All-Big Ten Conference football team consists of American football players chosen as All-Big Ten Conference players for the 2001 NCAA Division I-A football season. The conference recognizes two official All-Big Ten selectors: (1) the Big Ten conference coaches selected separate offensive and defensive units and named first- and second-team players (the "Coaches" team); and (2) a panel of sports writers and broadcasters covering the Big Ten also selected offensive and defensive units and named first- and second-team players (the "Media" team).

== Offensive selections ==
=== Quarterbacks ===
- Antwaan Randle El, Indiana (Coaches-1; Media-1)
- Kurt Kittner, Illinois (Coaches-2; Media-2)

=== Running backs ===
- Anthony Davis, Wisconsin (Coaches-1; Media-1)
- Levron Williams, Indiana (Coaches-1; Media-1)
- Jonathan Wells, Ohio State (Coaches-2; Media-2)
- Ladell Betts, Iowa (Coaches-2)
- T. J. Duckett, Michigan State (Media-2)

=== Receivers ===
- Lee Evans, Wisconsin (Coaches-1; Media-1)
- Marquise Walker, Michigan, (Coaches-1; Media-1)
- Brandon Lloyd, Illinois (Coaches-2; Media-2)
- Ron Johnson, Minnesota (Coaches-2)
- Charles Rogers, Michigan State (Media-2)

=== Centers ===
- LeCharles Bentley, Ohio State (Coaches-1; Media-1)
- Luke Butkus, Illinois (Coaches-2; Media-2)

=== Guards ===
- Jay Kulaga, Illinois (Coaches-1; Media-1)
- Eric Steinbach, Iowa (Coaches-1; Media-2)
- Jonathan Goodwin, Michigan (Coaches-2; Media-1)
- Enoch DeMar, Indiana (Coaches-2; Media-2)

=== Tackles ===
- Tony Pashos, Illinois (Coaches-1; Media-1)
- Tyson Walter, Ohio State (Coaches-1; Media-1)
- Ben Johnson, Wisconsin (Coaches-2; Media-2)
- David Porter, Iowa (Coaches-2; Media-2)

=== Tight ends ===
- Mark Anelli, Wisconsin (Coaches-1)
- Tim Stratton, Purdue (Media-1)
- Ben Utecht, Minnesota (tie) (Coaches-2)
- Chris Baker, Michigan State (tie) (Coaches-2; Media-2)

== Defensive selections ==
=== Defensive linemen ===
- Akin Ayodele, Purdue (Coaches-1; Media-1)
- Wendell Bryant, Wisconsin (Coaches-1; Media-1)
- Mike Collins, Ohio State (Coaches-2)
- Napoleon Harris, Northwestern (Coaches-2; Media-2)
- Aaron Kampman, Iowa (Coaches-2; Media-1)
- Jimmy Kennedy, Penn State (Coaches-1; Media-2)
- Matt Mitrione, Purdue (Coaches-1; Media-2)
- Shantee Orr, Michigan (Media-2)
- Dan Rumishek, Michigan (Media-1)
- Josh Shaw, Michigan State (Coaches-2)

=== Linebackers ===
- Larry Foote, Michigan (Coaches-1; Media-1)
- Nick Greisen, Wisconsin (Coaches-1; Media-1)
- Josh Thornhill, Michigan State (Coaches-1; Media-1)
- Victor Hobson, Michigan (Coaches-2; Media-2)
- Kevin Bentley, Northwestern (Coaches-2)
- Joe Cooper, Ohio State (Coaches-2)
- Jerry Schumacher, Illinois (Media-2)
- Justin Smith, Indiana (Media-2)

=== Defensive backs ===
- Jack Brewer, Minnesota (Media-1)
- Mike Doss, Ohio State (Coaches-1; Media-1)
- Mike Echols, Wisconsin (Coaches-1; Media-2)
- Todd Howard, Michigan (Coaches-2)
- Bobby Jackson, Illinois (Coaches-2)
- Christian Morton, Illinois (Media-2)
- Derek Ross, Ohio State (Coaches-2; Media-2)
- Bob Sanders, Iowa (Coaches-1; Media-2)
- Stuart Schweigert, Purdue (Coaches-2; Media-1)
- Eugene Wilson, Illinois (Coaches-1; Media-1)

== Special teams ==
=== Kickers ===
- Travis Dorsch, Purdue (Coaches-1; Media-1)
- Hayden Epstein, Michigan (Coaches-2)
- Peter Christofilakos, Illinois (Media-2)

=== Punters ===
- Travis Dorsch, Purdue (Coaches-1; Media-1)
- Andy Groom, Ohio State (Coaches-2; Media-2)

== Key ==
Bold = selected as a first-team player by both the coaches and media panel

Coaches = selected by Big Ten Conference coaches

Media = selected by a media panel

== See also ==
- 2001 College Football All-America Team
