= Brian White (American football) =

American football player and coach (born 1964)

Current position
- Title: Senior analyst / Running backs
- Team: Bowling Green
- Conference: Mid–American

Biographical details
- Born: July 2, 1964 (age 62); Haverhill, Massachusetts, U.S.

Playing career
- 1982–1985: Harvard
- Position: Quarterback

Coaching career (HC unless noted)
- 1986–1987: Fordham (GA)
- 1988–1989: Notre Dame (GA)
- 1990: UNLV (QB)
- 1991–1992: UNLV (RB)
- 1993: Nevada (WR)
- 1994: UNLV (PGC/WR)
- 1995–1998: Wisconsin (RB)
- 1999–2005: Wisconsin (OC/RB)
- 2006–2007: Syracuse (OC/TE)
- 2008: Washington (TE/ST)
- 2009–2010: Florida (TE/FB)
- 2011–2014: Florida (RB)
- 2015: Boston College (WR)
- 2016–2019: Boston College (RB)
- 2020–2021: Colorado State (Sr. Assoc. HC/RB)
- 2022–2024: Bowling Green (RB)
- 2025–present: Bowling Green (Sr. Analyst/RB)

Accomplishments and honors

Awards
- AFCA NCAA I-A Assistant Coach of the Year (2004)

Brian White (born July 2, 1964) is an American college football coach. He is a senior analyst for the Bowling Green football team.

== Early life and playing career ==
White attended Harvard University in Cambridge, Massachusetts, where he was a member of the football team. As a quarterback, he led the Crimson to a 7–3 record in 1985. He was second–team All–Ivy League and finished his career as the school's second all–time leading passer (2,335 yards). A two-year starter, White also made the ECAC honor roll. White has a B.A. in history from Harvard (1986), an M.A. in communications from Fordham (1988) and an MBA in finance from Notre Dame (1990).

== Coaching career ==
=== Early career ===
White began his coaching career as a graduate assistant at Fordham from 1986 to 1987. He then served as a graduate assistant at Notre Dame from 1988 to 1989, working primarily with the running backs. White joined the coaching staff of Jim Strong at UNLV where he coached quarterbacks (1990) and running backs (1991–1992).

In 1993, White joined the staff of Jeff Horton at Nevada as the wide receivers coach. As coordinator of the pass offense, White worked with quarterback Chris Vargas and wide receiver Bryan Reeves. Vargas led the nation in total offense and Reeves was the nation's second leading receiver with 92 catches. Nevada-Reno led the nation in total offense with a per–game average of 589 yards.

White followed head coach Jeff Horton to UNLV where the 1994 Rebels won the Big West championship and then defeated Central Michigan 52–24 in the Las Vegas Bowl.

=== Wisconsin ===
White spent his first four seasons with the Badgers as the running backs coach. He was promoted to offensive coordinator after the departure of offensive coordinator Brad Childress. In 1999, Wisconsin won the Big Ten Conference championship outright as well as the Rose Bowl. Under White's tutelage as running backs coach, Ron Dayne won the Heisman Trophy.

During each of his first eight years at Wisconsin, White helped the Badgers produce a 1,000– yard rusher. In 2001, Anthony Davis ranked fifth in the nation in rushing and wide receiver Lee Evans set the Big Ten record for single–season receiving yards. In 2000, Michael Bennett was the nation's third-leading rusher and had a school–record six 200-yard passing games. White was the running backs coach during the Badgers’ 1998 Big Ten championship season and was the offensive coordinator the next year when UW repeated as league champions.

In 2004, White won the AFCA Assistant Coach of the Year Award, which honors the best assistant coach in college football.

=== Florida ===
White was hired by Urban Meyer at Florida as the tight ends and fullbacks coach for the 2009 season. After Meyer's departure, White served under Will Muschamp as running backs coach.

=== Later career ===
Under head coach Steve Addazio, White served in a variety of capacities at both Boston College and later Colorado State.

White was hired by longtime colleague Scot Loeffler to be running backs coach at Bowling Green. White was later retained on the staff by new head coach Eddie George.
