= Peter Christofilakos =

American football and soccer player (born 1981)

Peter Christofilaskos
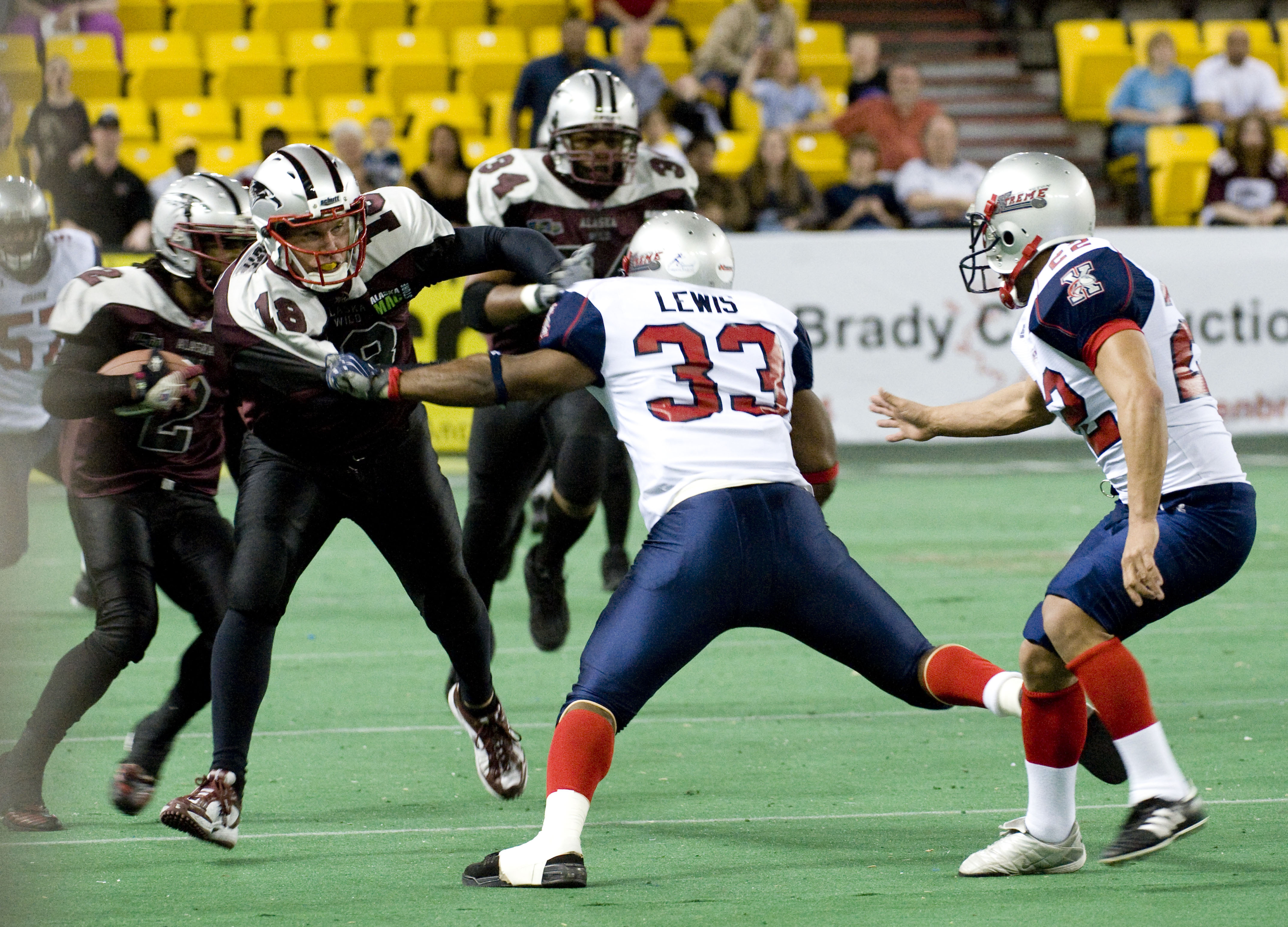
- Christofilakos on the far right (2009)

No. 22
- Position: Kicker

Personal information
- Born: May 28, 1981 (age 45); Springfield, Illinois, U.S.
- Listed height: 5 ft 8 in (1.73 m)
- Listed weight: 180 lb (82 kg)

Career information
- High school: Sacred Heart-Griffin (Springfield)
- College: Illinois
- NFL draft: 2004: undrafted

Career history
- Bloomington Extreme/Edge (2006–2013); Arizona Rattlers (2007)

Awards and highlights
- First-team All-IFL (2009); UIF Eastern All-Star (2008); 2× Second-team UIF All-Star (2006, 2007); UIF Special Teams Player of the Year (2008); Second-team All-Big Ten (2001)

Career AFL statistics
- FG made: 0
- FG attempts: 2
- PAT made: 12
- PAT attempts: 13
- Tackles: 1
- Stats at ArenaFan.com

Peter Harold Christofilakos (born May 28, 1981) is an American former professional football kicker. He attended the University of Illinois and was a soccer team player. He was a member of the Bloomington Extreme/Edge and Arizona Rattlers.

== High school ==
Peter played soccer and football at Sacred Heart-Griffin High School. He holds the Central State 8 Conference's record for longest field goals with a 46 yarder. He was a three-year starter on the soccer team. His senior year, he was named All-state in soccer as well as football. He led the soccer team to the 1999 tournament and was named Most Valuable Player. To this day he still holds the school record in soccer goals with 123. In his senior year he played in the All-Star game for Central Illinois. He was the captain of the North Team. He was a Two-time Adidas soccer All-American. Peter was a member of the Olympic Development Program and was chosen for the soccer national team. At the age of 15 Peter was given an opportunity to play professional soccer in Greece but turned it down to focus on his education.

== College career ==
Christofilakos attended the University of Illinois. He was a member of the team from 1999 to 2002. In 2001, Christofilakos only missed one field goal. He decided to skip his senior season and enter the 2003 NFL draft. In 2003, he was a member of the University of Illinois soccer team and led the American Midwest Conference in scoring with 23 goals.

== Professional career ==
Despite declaring for the NFL draft as a junior, Peter went undrafted. In 2006, Christofilakos was signed by the Bloomington Extreme. He made 143 field goals for the team. He earned Second Team UIF All-Star honors in 2006 and 2007. He garnered UIF Eastern Conference All-Star accolades in 2008. He was also named the UIF Special Teams Player of the Year in 2008. In 2014, his No. 22 jersey was retired by the Bloomington Edge. In 2007, he was signed by the Arizona Rattlers of the Arena Football League. In 2011, he was brought back by the Bloomington Extreme. Peter was also a member of the semi-professional soccer team the Springfield Spirits and also played for the St. Louis Illusion of the Professional Arena Soccer League

== Personal ==
On June 12, 2010, Peter was named the new head coach of the boys' soccer team at Sacred Heart-Griffin High School. He replaced his former high school coach Sam Tate. In July 2015, Peter was named head coach of the Lincoln Land Community College men's soccer team. He is married to Stephanie Brake, a former basketball player at Robert Morris University.
