= Mike Echols (gridiron football) =

American football player (born 1978)

No. 20, 36
- Position: Cornerback

Personal information
- Born: October 13, 1978 (age 48); Youngstown, Ohio, U.S.
- Listed height: 5 ft 10 in (1.78 m)
- Listed weight: 185 lb (84 kg)

Career information
- High school: Ursuline (Youngstown)
- College: Wisconsin
- NFL draft: 2002: 4th round, 110th overall pick

Career history
- Tennessee Titans (2002–2004); Indianapolis Colts (2004)*; Atlanta Falcons (2004); Indianapolis Colts (2004); Minnesota Vikings (2004)*; Detroit Lions (2004–2005); Hamilton Tiger-Cats (2006)
- * Offseason or practice squad member only

Awards and highlights
- First-team All-Big Ten (2001); Second-team All-Big Ten (2000)

Career NFL statistics
- Tackles: 32
- Stats at Pro Football Reference

Michael Kitome Echols (born October 13, 1978) is an American former professional football player who was a cornerback who played in the National Football League (NFL) and Canadian Football League (CFL). He played college football for the Wisconsin Badgers. and was selected in the fourth round of the 2002 NFL draft by the Tennessee Titans.

At Wisconsin, he was a four–year starter at cornerback. He finished his career with a recovered fumble and 12 interceptions, returning one for a touchdown. Before his junior season in 2000, he was suspended one game for receiving unadvertised discounts at a shoe store. After the season, he was given second-team All-Big Ten Conference honors. In 2002, after graduating from Wisconsin, he declared for the NFL Draft. He was selected by the Titans and debuted later that season. However, after four weeks, he injured his leg and missed the rest of the season. The following season, he saw limited action before being released by the team in 2004. After his stint with the Titans ended, he spent time with the Atlanta Falcons, Indianapolis Colts, and Detroit Lions, failing to appear in a game for any of the teams. In 2006, Echols played his final professional game for the Hamilton Tiger-Cats of the CFL, intercepting a pass in his only game for the team.

== Early life ==
Echols was born on October 13, 1978, in Youngstown, Ohio. He has type 1 diabetes and requires the use of insulin. He attended Ursuline High School in Youngstown, where he was named third-team All-State. In his senior season, he recorded ten interceptions. He also played wide receiver for the football team, recording 25 receptions for 558 yards in his career. A member of the basketball team, he was a freshman when the team won the state title.

As a freshman at Wisconsin in 1997, Echols was redshirted, but in 1998, he entered week one of the season as a starting cornerback opposite fellow redshirt freshman Jamar Fletcher. Against Purdue on October 11, he intercepted quarterback Drew Brees in the end zone, ending their first drive of the game. Wisconsin won 31–24. He finished the season with three interceptions. In 1999, he started the season off poorly, being beat for touchdowns often; however, as the season progressed, his performances improved. During the season, he intercepted just one pass. Before his junior season in 2000, Echols and 25 of his teammates were suspended for the start of the season by the National Collegiate Athletic Association (NCAA) for receiving unadvertised discounts at a shoe store. He served his one-game suspension during week two of the season, in which Wisconsin won 27–23 against Oregon. On November 4, against Minnesota, he intercepted a pass and returned it 56 yards for a touchdown. He finished the season with five total interceptions, as well as a fumble recovery. Echols also set a school record with 25 pass deflections. He was named second–team All–Big Ten Conference for his performances that season. Entering 2001, Echols became the only returning member of Wisconsin's secondary after the other players either graduated or declared for the 2001 NFL draft. In an interview about the team, secondary coach Todd Bradford said that Echols, "is probably as good a tackling defensive back as there is in the country." On September 27, after Wisconsin lost to Oregon early in the month, Oregon's quarterback Joey Harrington, in a diary for ESPN.com, stated that Echols, "is one of the best corners I have ever played against. He was very impressive." He finished his senior season at Wisconsin with three interceptions. He graduated in 2002 with a degree in behavioral science and law.

== Professional career ==
=== Tennessee Titans ===
Prior to the 2002 NFL draft, Echols was considered to be the 14th-best cornerback in the draft class and was projected to go in either the fourth or fifth round by NFLDraftScout.com. Leading up to the draft, Pete Prisco of CBS Sports wrote that Echols, "isn't that big, but he can sure run." He also listed him as being a player that teams were underrating heading into the draft.

On the second day of the draft, Echols was selected with the 12th pick of the fourth round by the Tennessee Titans. On July 15, he signed a rookie contract with the Titans. However, on July 26, he was placed on the active/physically unable to perform list by the Titans. He made his debut with the Titans in week one against the Philadelphia Eagles. He recorded three tackles in the game. In week three, against the Cleveland Browns, Echols allowed the game–winning eight–yard touchdown to Browns wide receiver Dennis Northcutt. In the Titans' week four game against the Oakland Raiders, he suffered a leg injury and did not play another game for the rest of the season. He underwent surgery on his left tibia in December. He finished the season with 24 tackles in four games. The following season, he played sparingly, appearing in just five games and recording just eight tackles. His season debut came in week six against the Houston Texans, in which he recorded no tackles. Against both the Jacksonville Jaguars and Miami Dolphins, he recorded three tackles. In the 2004 preseason, after starting cornerback Samari Rolle injured his ankle, Echols started at right cornerback for the Titans. On August 30, against the Dallas Cowboys, he gave up 35-yard pass interference penalty, leading to the Cowboys' Billy Cundiff making a field goal to end the first half of the game. Despite starting, he was considered a candidate to be traded at the end of training camp, only to be released on September 14.

=== Later career ===
On September 20, 2004, Echols was signed to the practice squad of the Indianapolis Colts. In early October, he was signed off the Colts' practice squad by the Atlanta Falcons, but was waived on October 26 without making an appearance for Atlanta. The Colts re-signed him to their practice squad three days later. He was later promoted from the practice squad, only to be waived. On December 16, was signed to the Minnesota Vikings' practice squad. The Detroit Lions then signed him off the Vikings' practice squad on December 22. After becoming a restricted free agent at season's end, he re-signed with the Lions on April 14, 2005. He made the 53-man roster out of training camp, but was waived on October 13.

After his release by the Titans, he never appeared in another NFL game, despite being on the active roster for nine games in 2004. He finished his NFL career with 32 tackles in nine games, all of which came with Tennessee. On July 4, 2006, he signed with the Hamilton Tiger-Cats of the Canadian Football League. In his debut with Hamilton on July 21, he intercepted a pass from Montreal Alouettes quarterback Anthony Calvillo and returned it 94 yards for a touchdown. However, a week later, he was released by the team.
