= Victor Hobson =

American football player (born 1980)

No. 54, 58, 57
- Position: Linebacker

Personal information
- Born: February 3, 1980 (age 46); Mount Laurel, New Jersey, U.S.
- Listed height: 6 ft 2 in (1.88 m)
- Listed weight: 254 lb (115 kg)

Career information
- High school: St. Joseph's Preparatory School (Philadelphia, Pennsylvania)
- College: Michigan
- NFL draft: 2003: 2nd round, 53rd overall pick

Career history
- New York Jets (2003–2007); New England Patriots (2008)*; Cincinnati Bengals (2008); Arizona Cardinals (2008)
- * Offseason or practice squad member only

Awards and highlights
- First-team All-Big Ten (2002); Second-team All-Big Ten (2001)

Career NFL statistics
- Total tackles: 354
- Sacks: 11
- Forced fumbles: 2
- Fumble recoveries: 5
- Interceptions: 3
- Defensive touchdowns: 1
- Stats at Pro Football Reference

Victor Brian Hobson (born February 3, 1980) is an American former professional football player who was a linebacker in the National Football League (NFL). He played college football for the Michigan Wolverines. Hobson was selected in the second round of the 2003 NFL draft by the New York Jets, for whom he played from 2003 to 2007. He also played in the NFL for the Cincinnati Bengals and Arizona Cardinals. After his football career, he became an executive producer for Global Entertainment.

== Early life ==
Hobson was born in Mount Laurel, New Jersey, where he grew up for most of his life. He commuted from New Jersey to Philadelphia for his high school football career at St. Joseph's Preparatory. His coach saw that Hobson had large hands and feet to accompany his awkward walk and thin 6-2 frame and thus was nicknamed "Little Pup." At the end of his sophomore year he had grown to a 215-pound frame, meriting the nickname "Big Dog." At St. Joe's he started at both middle linebacker and tight end. In 1997, he led the St. Joe's prep football team to their first championship in 20 years and was voted the Catholic League best all-around player. Among almost 40 division I football offers he chose to attend his lifetime favorite school, the University of Michigan.

== College career ==
At the University of Michigan, Hobson started 39 of 49 games for the Wolverines, registering 277 tackles, 15 sacks, 3 fumble recoveries, 4 forced fumbles, 6 passes defensed, and 2 interceptions. His 47 stops for losses placed him third all time in Michigan history behind Curtis Greer and Mark Messner. He was named the 2000 winner of The Roger Zatkoff Award as the team's best linebacker. He entered the NFL draft after his senior year at Michigan.

== Professional career ==
Pre-draft measurables
Height	Weight	Arm length	Hand span	40-yard dash	10-yard split	20-yard split	20-yard shuttle	Three-cone drill	Vertical jump	Broad jump	Bench press
6 ft 0 in (1.83 m)	252 lb (114 kg)	32 1/2 in (0.83 m)	10 in (0.25 m)	4.82 s	1.74 s	2.86 s	4.33 s	7.26 s	33 in (0.84 m)	9 ft 9 in (2.97 m)	29 reps
All values from NFL Combine.

After the NFL Scouting Combine listed him as the number 2 out of 34 linebacker prospects, he was selected 53rd overall in the second round by the New York Jets, joining his fellow Michigan teammate B. J. Askew (fullback), also drafted by the Jets in 2003. Hobson lasted five seasons in New York City. In 2006, he registered a career high 100 tackles on 66 solo tackles and 34 assisted tackles and 6 sacks.

=== NFL statistics ===
Year	Team	GP	Tackles				Pass Def,	Interceptions				
Year	Team	GP	Total	Solo	Ast	Sack	Pass Def,	Int	TDs	Yds	Avg	Lng
2008	Arizona Cardinals	1	1	1	0	0	--	0	--	--	0	--
2008	Cincinnati Bengals	2	0	0	0	--	--	--	--	--	0	--
2007	New York Jets	16	62	48	14	2	4	--	--	--	0	--
2006	New York Jets	16	100	66	34	6	2	1	0	9	9	9
2005	New York Jets	16	80	54	26	1	0	--	--	--	0	--
2004	New York Jets	12	45	30	15	0	2	1	0	2	2	2
2003	New York Jets	16	56	38	18	2	0	1	0	26	26	26

== Philanthropy ==
In 2006 Hobson and his wife L’Tesia started the Hobson & Hobson outreach in spring of 2006. They have pledged millions to set up homes abroad including the United States for children and adults with special needs.

== Film entertainment ==
Hobson works at Global entertainment, founded in 2010, where he acts as a writer, producer, and director. He was the Executive Producer for the film “C’mon Man”, released on June 26, 2012. Hobson and his wife continued to work on multiple motion pictures.

== Personal life ==
Hobson and his wife, director and film Producer L'tesia Asensio Hobson, reside in London and Beverly Hills. They have seven children.
