= Kevin Cosgrove (American football) =

American football player and coach (born 1955)

Biographical details
- Born: December 27, 1955 (age 70); Chicago, Illinois

Playing career
- 1974: Benedictine College (Ill.)
- 1976–1978: UW–Oshkosh

Coaching career (HC unless noted)
- 1980–1982: Illinois (GA)
- 1983: Morehead State (LB)
- 1983–1987: Illinois (LB)
- 1988: Southeast Missouri State (DC/LB)
- 1989: Colorado State (LB)
- 1990–1994: Wisconsin (ILB)
- 1995–2003: Wisconsin (DC/ILB)
- 2004–2007: Nebraska (DC/LB)
- 2009–2010: Minnesota (Co-DC/LB)
- 2011: Akron (DC)
- 2012–2013: New Mexico (ILB)
- 2014: New Mexico (DC/ILB)
- 2015–2018: New Mexico (DC/LB)
- 2019: LSU (Lead defensive analyst)
- 2020–2021: Texas Tech (LB)
- 2022: LIU (DC)
- 2023: LIU (Special Asst. to the Head Coach)

Kevin Cosgrove (born December 27, 1955) is an American college football coach.

== Early life and playing career ==
Cosgrove was born in Chicago, Illinois and graduated from Mount Carmel High School. He attended Benedictine College in Chicago, where he was a member of the football team. He transferred to the University of Wisconsin–Oshkosh where he earned two varsity letters in football. Cosgrove received a B.S. degree in physical education from UW–Oshkosh in 1980.

== Coaching career ==
=== Early career ===
Cosgrove began his coaching career as a graduate assistant at Illinois from 1980 to 1982. He became a linebackers coach on the staff of head coach Mike White from 1983 to 1987.

=== Wisconsin ===
In 1990, Cosgrove joined the staff of head coach Barry Alvarez at Wisconsin as an inside linebackers coach.

From 1995 to 2003, Cosgrove served as defensive coordinator and linebackers coach.

Wisconsin's 1993 and 1998 football teams earned a share of the Big Ten title with the 1999 team winning the conference title outright. All three teams won their respective Rose Bowls.

=== Nebraska ===
In 2004, Cosgrove joined the staff of head coach Bill Callahan as defensive coordinator at Nebraska.

=== New Mexico ===
From 2012 to 2018, Cosgrove served on the staff of head coach Bob Davie at New Mexico.
