= Joey Boese =

American football player (born 1980)

Cincinnati Bengals
- Title: Strength and conditioning

Personal information
- Born: February 8, 1980 (age 46); Chicago, Illinois, U.S.
- Listed height: 5 ft 11 in (1.80 m)
- Listed weight: 185 lb (84 kg)

Career information
- Position: Defensive back (No. 23)
- High school: Mater Dei (Santa Ana, California)
- College: Wisconsin (1998–2001)
- NFL draft: 2002: undrafted

Career history

Playing
- Calgary Stampeders (2003–2006)

Coaching
- Texas A&M (2008–2011) Assistant strength and conditioning; Fresno State (2012–2015) Strength and conditioning; Illinois (2016–2018) Strength and conditioning; Cincinnati Bengals (2019–present) Strength and conditioning

Awards and highlights
- CFL West All-Star (2004)

Joey Boese (boze-EH; born February 8, 1980) is an American football coach and former player. He is the strength and conditioning coach for the Cincinnati Bengals of the National Football League (NFL). He played college football for the Wisconsin Badgers and professionally for the Calgary Stampeders of the Canadian Football League (CFL).

== Early life ==
Joey Boese was born on February 8, 1980, in Chicago, Illinois. He was diagnosed with dyslexia at age 7. He played high school football at Mater Dei High School in Santa Ana, California, as a wide receiver and defensive back, earning All-CIF honors.

== College career ==
In 1998, Boese enrolled at the University of Wisconsin–Madison to play college football for the Badgers. He was a four-year letterman from 1998 to 2001, and a two-year starter. He finished his college career with three interceptions and a 26-yard fumble recovery touchdown. Boese earned academic all-Big Ten Conference honors in his final three seasons. He graduated from Wisconsin in 2002 with a bachelor's in communication arts. He later earned a master's of science in health, physical education, and recreation from Emporia State University in 2008.

== Professional career ==
Boese went undrafted in the 2002 NFL draft. He signed with the Calgary Stampeders of the Canadian Football League (CFL) on May 5, 2003. He dressed in 43 games from 2003 to 2006. He was named a CFL West All-Star in 2004 after posting 105 tackles, the second-most in the league. Boese lost his starting job in 2006, only dressing for two games before being released in July 2006. He ended his CFL career with 160 defensive tackles, 31 special teams tackles, seven interceptions for 23 yards, one forced fumble, two fumble recoveries, nine pass breakups, one kick return for 11 yards, and one punt return for 11 yards.

== Coaching career ==
Boese was the assistant strength and conditioning coach at Texas A&M from 2008 to 2011 and the strength and conditioning coach for the Texas A&M Aggies baseball team from 2009 to 2011. In January 2012, he was hired to be the strength and conditioning coach at San Diego State but quit after two weeks. He was the head strength and conditioning coach at Fresno State from 2012 to 2015 and Illinois from 2016 to 2018. Boese has been the strength and conditioning coach for the Cincinnati Bengals since 2019.
