= Mark Anelli =

American football player (born 1979)

No. 85
- Position: Tight end

Personal information
- Born: June 5, 1979 (age 47); Addison, Illinois, U.S.
- Listed height: 6 ft 3 in (1.91 m)
- Listed weight: 265 lb (120 kg)

Career information
- High school: Addison Trail
- College: Wisconsin (1998–2001)
- NFL draft: 2002: 6th round, 201st overall pick

Career history
- San Francisco 49ers (2002–2003); Chicago Bears (2003–2004)*; New York Giants (2004)*; Atlanta Falcons (2005)*; Frankfurt Galaxy (2005); Tampa Bay Buccaneers (2006)*; St. Louis Rams (2006–2007)*
- * Offseason or practice squad member only

Awards and highlights
- First-team All-Big Ten (2001)
- Stats at Pro Football Reference

Mark Anthony Anelli (born June 5, 1979) is an American former professional football player who was a tight end in the National Football League (NFL). He played college football for the Wisconsin Badgers. He last played on the St. Louis Rams' practice squad in 2007.

== Education and career ==
Anelli attended Addison Trail High school in Addison, Illinois. He was an honor roll student and a letterman in football, basketball and baseball. In football, he was named the Team's Most Valuable Player, an All-Area selection, and named to the All-State Honorable Mention team. In baseball, he was named as an All-Conference & Area selection.

In basketball, he was named to All-Conference. Mark Anelli graduated from Addison Trail High School in 1997 and attended the University of Wisconsin–Madison, where he graduated with an Agricultural Business degree.

=== Collegiate career ===
In 1998, Anelli would join the Wisconsin Badgers football team. He would win the Rose Bowl in 1999 as a freshman, although he only caught 10 passes for 78 yards that season. In 2001, as a senior, he caught 35 passes for 357 yards and 3 touchdowns, playing in 12 games for the Badgers.

=== Professional career ===
Mark Anelli was selected in the 2002 NFL draft by the San Francisco 49ers in the 6th round, 201st overall. He bounced around between the active roster and the practice squad before he was waived on August 13, 2003. He then signed a two-year contract with the Chicago Bears, ending up on the practice squad again, before being released on August 30, 2004. He then signed with the New York Giants practice squad, before being released before the 2004 season ended. In 2005, he signed with the Atlanta Falcons, before being sent to NFL Europe, playing for the Frankfurt Galaxy, before being waived in final roster cuts. In 2006, he was cut by the Tampa Bay Buccaneers in final roster cuts. 2 days later, he was signed to the St. Louis Rams practice squad. He was released on August 31, 2007.
