= Ben Johnson (offensive tackle) =

American football player (born 1980)

No. 74
- Position: Offensive tackle

Personal information
- Born: April 7, 1980 (age 46); Brussels, Wisconsin, U.S.
- Listed height: 6 ft 6 in (1.98 m)
- Listed weight: 329 lb (149 kg)

Career information
- High school: Brussels (WI) Southern Door
- College: Wisconsin
- NFL draft: 2003: 7th round, 216th overall pick

Career history
- Detroit Lions (2003–2004)*; Chicago Bears (2004–2005)*; → Frankfurt Galaxy (2005); → Amsterdam Admirals (2005); Carolina Panthers (2005)*; San Diego Chargers (2005–2006)*; → Hamburg Sea Devils (2006)
- * Offseason or practice squad member only

Awards and highlights
- Second-team All-Big Ten (2001)

Ben Johnson (born April 7, 1980) is an American former professional football offensive tackle of the National Football League (NFL). He was selected by the Detroit Lions in the seventh round of the 2003 NFL draft with the 216th overall pick. He played college football at Wisconsin.

Johnson was also a member of the Chicago Bears, Carolina Panthers, and San Diego Chargers.

== Personal life ==
Johnson is a cousin of former Wisconsin teammate and NFL offensive lineman Al Johnson, who was also drafted in the 2003 NFL draft.
