= Tim Davis (American football) =

American gridiron football player and coach (born 1958)

Current position
- Title: Offensive line
- Team: Southern Oregon
- Conference: Frontier

Biographical details
- Born: June 17, 1958 (age 68); Castro Valley, California, U.S.

Playing career
- 1979–1980: Utah
- 1981: Hamilton Tiger-Cats
- 1983: Los Angeles Express
- Position: Offensive tackle

Coaching career (HC unless noted)
- 1983–1986: Wisconsin (GA)
- 1987: Arizona (GA)
- 1988: Walla Walla (OC/OL)
- 1989: Idaho State (OL)
- 1990–1997: Utah (OL/TE)
- 1998–2001: Wisconsin (OL/TE)
- 2002–2004: USC (OL)
- 2005–2007: Miami Dolphins (AOL)
- 2008: Alabama (DPP)
- 2009–2010: Minnesota (OL)
- 2011: Utah (OL)
- 2012–2013: Florida (OL)
- 2014: SMU (assistant OL)
- 2015–2018: Northern Arizona (OL)
- 2020: Southern Oregon (OL)
- 2021–2023: Montana State (OL/RGC)

Timothy Wayne Davis (born June 17, 1958) is an American football coach and former player.

== Playing career ==
Davis played college football offensive tackle at Chabot College in Hayward, California. He transferred to University of Utah in 1978 and graduated from the Salt Lake City campus in 1982. Davis earned his master's degree in higher education from Wisconsin in 1986. He played in the Canadian Football League (CFL) for the Hamilton Tiger-Cats in 1981 and for the Los Angeles Express of the United States Football League (USFL) in 1983.

== Coaching career ==
Davis started his coaching career at the University of Wisconsin, where he was a volunteer assistant in 1983, followed by a two-year stint as a graduate assistant. In 1986, he returned to his role as a volunteer assistant. He joined the University of Arizona as a graduate assistant in 1987, then worked as the offensive coordinator for Walla Walla Community College for the 1988 season.

In 1989, Davis moved to Idaho State University, where he worked as an offensive line coach, then in the same position from 1990 to 1997 at the University of Utah. In 1997, Davis rejoined the Wisconsin Badgers football team as the tight end and offensive tackles coach. He would remain in Madison until 2001.

In 2002, Davis was the offensive line coach for the University of Southern California, where he coached All-American Jacob Rogers, as well as future NFL players Winston Justice and Fred Matua. In 2005, he left the Trojans to join the Miami Dolphins, where he coached the offensive line, until 2007. In 2008, he joined the University of Alabama as the director of player personnel. Davis was hired in 2008 as offensive line coach and running game coordinator at the University of Minnesota. In 2011, he became the offensive line coach at the University of Utah. In 2012, Davis was hired as the offensive line coach at the University of Florida. Davis was fired from Florida on December 1, 2013, along with offensive coordinator Brent Pease after Florida's sub-par season. On September 15, 2014, Davis was hired by Southern Methodist University as the assistant offensive line coach.
