= Nick Davis (American football) =

American football player (born 1979)

No. 17, 86
- Position: Wide receiver

Personal information
- Born: October 6, 1979 (age 47); Manchester, Michigan, U.S.
- Listed height: 6 ft 0 in (1.83 m)
- Listed weight: 180 lb (82 kg)

Career information
- High school: Manchester
- College: Wisconsin
- NFL draft: 2002: undrafted

Career history
- Minnesota Vikings (2002–2003); Miami Dolphins (2004)*; Scottish Claymores (2004)
- * Offseason or practice squad member only

Career NFL statistics
- Rushing attempts: 1
- Rushing yards: 11
- Kick returns: 18
- Kick return yards: 368
- Punt returns: 24
- Punt returns yards: 190
- Stats at Pro Football Reference

Nick Davis (born October 6, 1979) is an American former professional football player who was a wide receiver in the National Football League (NFL). He played two seasons with the Minnesota Vikings. He played college football for the Wisconsin Badgers.

== Career statistics ==
=== Return ===
Year	Team	Games		Kick return							Punt return								
Year	Team	GP	GS	Ret	Yds	Avg	Lng	TDs	+20	+40	Ret	Yds	Avg	Lng	TDs	+20	+40	FC	Fum
2002	MIN	15	0	18	368	20.4	39	0	9	0	24	190	7.9	57	0	1	1	0	3
2003	MIN	1	0	0	0	0	0	0	0	0	0	0	0	0	0	0	0	0	0
Career		16	0	18	368	20.4	39	0	9	0	24	190	7.9	57	0	1	1	0	3
