= Ben Herbert =

American football coach (born 1979)

Los Angeles Chargers
- Title: Executive director of player performance

Personal information
- Born: November 30, 1979 (age 46); Pittsburgh, Pennsylvania, U.S.

Career information
- Positions: Defensive end, linebacker
- College: Wisconsin (1998–2001)

Career history
- Wisconsin (2002) Intern; Wisconsin (2003–2008) Assistant strength & conditioning coach; Wisconsin (2009–2012) Head of strength & conditioning coach; Arkansas (2013–2017) Head of strength & conditioning coach; Michigan (2018–2023) Assistant head coach & director of strength and conditioning; Los Angeles Chargers (2024–present) Executive director of player performance

Awards and highlights
- CFP national champion (2023)

Ben Herbert (born November 30, 1979) is an American football coach, currently the executive director of player performance for the Los Angeles Chargers of the National Football League (NFL). He previously served as the head strength and conditioning coach at the University of Arkansas, University of Wisconsin, and the University of Michigan; where he helped the Michigan Wolverines football program win a national championship in 2023.
