= Anthony Davis (running back, born 1982) =

American gridiron football player

No. 28
- Position: Running back

Personal information
- Born: May 21, 1982 (age 44); Plainfield, New Jersey, U.S.
- Listed height: 5 ft 7 in (1.70 m)
- Listed weight: 205 lb (93 kg)

Career information
- College: Wisconsin
- NFL draft: 2005: 7th round, 243rd overall pick

Career history
- Indianapolis Colts (2005)*; Hamilton Tiger-Cats (2006–2007); Toronto Argonauts (2007)*
- * Offseason or practice squad member only

Awards and highlights
- First-team All-Big Ten (2001); 2× Second-team All-Big Ten (2002, 2004); Big Ten Freshman of the Year (2001)
- Stats at CFL.ca (archive)

Anthony Davis (born May 21, 1982) is an American former professional football player who was a running back in the Canadian Football League (CFL). Davis was born in Plainfield, New Jersey and played college football for four years with the Wisconsin Badgers. He was selected in the 2005 NFL draft by the Indianapolis Colts.

== Professional career ==
Davis, nicknamed the A-train, played two seasons with the Hamilton Tiger-Cats, where he carried the ball 86 times for 457 yards and one touchdown. In December 2007, he was traded to the Toronto Argonauts in exchange for receiver Frank Murphy and in April, 2008, the Argos released him.

He currently serves as Director of Inter-Cultural Programs at Loras College in Dubuque, Iowa.
