= Wendell Bryant =

American football player (born 1980)

No. 91, 77
- Position: Defensive tackle

Personal information
- Born: September 12, 1980 (age 46); Minneapolis, Minnesota, U.S.
- Listed height: 6 ft 5 in (1.96 m)
- Listed weight: 303 lb (137 kg)

Career information
- High school: Ritenour (Breckenridge Hills, Missouri)
- College: Wisconsin
- NFL draft: 2002: 1st round, 12th overall pick

Career history
- Arizona Cardinals (2002–2004); Las Vegas Locomotives (2009); Omaha Nighthawks (2010)

Awards and highlights
- First-team All-American (2001); 2× Big Ten Defensive Lineman of the Year (2000, (Note: Co-winner this season alongside Karon Riley.) 2001); 3× First-team All-Big Ten (1999, 2000, 2001)

Career NFL statistics
- Total tackles: 44
- Sacks: 1.5
- Stats at Pro Football Reference

Wendell Bryant (born September 12, 1980) is an American former professional football player who was a defensive tackle in the National Football League (NFL). He was selected by the Arizona Cardinals 12th overall in the 2002 NFL draft. He played college football for the Wisconsin Badgers.

== College career ==
After graduating from Ritenour High School in St. Louis, Missouri, Bryant played college football at the University of Wisconsin–Madison. He played in back to back Rose Bowls his freshman & sophomore years of college. He had a key sack to help secure the 1999 Rose Bowl victory. He won the Big Ten defensive lineman of the Year Award in his junior and senior years.

== Professional career ==
=== Arizona Cardinals ===
Bryant was drafted by the Arizona Cardinals in the first round with the 12th overall pick. He played with the team during the 2002, 2003, and 2004 seasons. He was suspended for the 2005 season after committing a third strike in the NFL's substance abuse policy and never returned to the league.

=== Las Vegas Locomotives ===
Bryant was drafted by the Las Vegas Locomotives of the United Football League and signed on August 5, 2009. He was placed on injured reserve on November 19, 2009.

=== NFL statistics ===
Year	Team	GP	COMB	TOTAL	AST	SACK	FF	FR	FR YDS	INT	IR YDS	AVG IR	LNG	TD	PD
2002	ARI	14	19	11	8	1.5	0	0	0	0	0	0	0	0	0
2003	ARI	12	19	16	3	0.0	0	0	0	0	0	0	0	0	0
2004	ARI	3	1	1	0	0.0	0	0	0	0	0	0	0	0	0
Career		29	39	28	11	1.5	0	0	0	0	0	0	0	0	0
