= Nick Greisen =

American football player (born 1979)

No. 54, 55, 59
- Position: Linebacker

Personal information
- Born: August 10, 1979 (age 47); Sturgeon Bay, Wisconsin, U.S.
- Listed height: 6 ft 1 in (1.85 m)
- Listed weight: 242 lb (110 kg)

Career information
- High school: Sturgeon Bay
- College: Wisconsin
- NFL draft: 2002: 5th round, 152nd overall pick

Career history
- New York Giants (2002–2005); Jacksonville Jaguars (2006); Baltimore Ravens (2007–2008); Denver Broncos (2009); Omaha Nighthawks (2010–2011)

Awards and highlights
- 2× First-team All-Big Ten (2000, 2001)

Career NFL statistics
- Total tackles: 263
- Sacks: 4.0
- Forced fumbles: 5
- Fumble recoveries: 7
- Interceptions: 1
- Stats at Pro Football Reference

Nick A. Greisen (/ˈɡraɪsən/ GRY-sən; born August 10, 1979) is an American former professional football player who was a linebacker in the National Football League (NFL). He was selected by the New York Giants in the fifth round of the 2002 NFL draft. He played college football for the Wisconsin Badgers.

Greisen also played for the Jacksonville Jaguars, Baltimore Ravens and Denver Broncos. He is the younger brother of quarterback Chris Greisen and the cousin of offensive lineman Casey Rabach.

== Early life ==
Greisen was born and raised in Sturgeon Bay, Wisconsin. He attended Sturgeon Bay High School, where he played running back, linebacker and punter on the football field. Greisen was a five-sport athlete his senior year of high school.

== College career ==
Greisen played college football at the University of Wisconsin–Madison after being offered a scholarship at a Badgers camp before his senior year of high school. After playing as a backup his freshman and sophomore years, Greisen cracked the starting lineup as a junior and led the Big Ten in tackles. He also earned All-Big Ten honors after his junior season. A team captain his senior year, he led the country in tackles and was first-team all-Big Ten.

== Professional career ==
=== New York Giants ===
Greisen was selected in the fifth round (152nd overall) by the New York Giants in the 2002 NFL draft. He played mostly on special teams during his first two seasons, and also made his first start in December of his rookie season when Mike Barrow was injured. He also saw significant playing time at linebacker after injuries to Barrett Green in 2004 and 2005 opened a starting position.

=== Jacksonville Jaguars ===
On April 28, 2006, the Jacksonville Jaguars signed Greisen to a two-year contract. The move came after Greisen could not put a deal together with the Tennessee Titans and the Jaguars tried unsuccessfully to sign LaVar Arrington. During the 2006 season, he started ten games and recorded an interception. Greisen was released by the team during final preseason roster cuts in 2007.

=== Baltimore Ravens ===
On September 19, 2007, Greisen signed with the Baltimore Ravens after the team waived Dennis Haley. On March 13, 2008, the Ravens re-signed him to a three-year, $4 million contract with a $1 million signing bonus. Greisen's defensive playing time sharply declined in the 2008 season, and the Ravens released him on March 13, 2009, in a move that saved the team $716,000 in salary cap space.

=== Denver Broncos ===
On April 28, 2009, Greisen signed a one-year contract with the Denver Broncos. He spent the season on injured reserve after sustaining a knee injury in training camp. He was resigned by the team on April 29, 2010. Greisen was waived by the team on August 12, 2010, when the team signed Johnny Williams.

=== Omaha Nighthawks ===
Greisen was signed by the Omaha Nighthawks of the United Football League on September 8, 2010. He spent the 2010 and 2011 seasons with the organization.

== NFL career statistics ==
Legend
**Bold**	Career high

=== Regular season ===
Year	Team	Games		Tackles					Interceptions					Fumbles			
Year	Team	GP	GS	Cmb	Solo	Ast	Sck	TFL	Int	Yds	TD	Lng	PD	FF	FR	Yds	TD
2002	NYG	8	1	8	7	1	1.0	0	0	0	0	0	0	1	1	0	0
2003	NYG	15	0	12	6	6	0.0	0	0	0	0	0	0	0	0	0	0
2004	NYG	15	7	80	61	19	**2.0**	2	0	0	0	0	**6**	1	1	0	0
2005	NYG	**16**	**12**	**88**	**67**	**21**	1.0	**9**	0	0	0	0	4	**3**	**3**	**28**	0
2006	JAX	**16**	10	34	31	3	0.0	6	**1**	**6**	0	**6**	3	0	1	1	0
2007	BAL	14	2	30	24	6	0.0	4	0	0	0	0	0	0	1	0	0
2008	BAL	14	1	11	10	1	0.0	0	0	0	0	0	0	0	0	0	0
		98	33	263	206	57	4.0	21	1	6	0	6	13	5	7	29	0

=== Playoffs ===
Year	Team	Games		Tackles					Interceptions					Fumbles			
Year	Team	GP	GS	Cmb	Solo	Ast	Sck	TFL	Int	Yds	TD	Lng	PD	FF	FR	Yds	TD
2002	NYG	1	0	1	1	0	0.0	0	0	0	0	0	0	0	0	0	0
2005	NYG	1	**1**	**7**	**4**	**3**	0.0	0	0	0	0	0	0	0	0	0	0
2008	BAL	**3**	0	3	3	0	0.0	0	0	0	0	0	0	0	0	0	0
		5	1	11	8	3	0.0	0	0	0	0	0	0	0	0	0	0

== Personal life ==
Greisen appeared on ElimiDate during his playing career in New York.

Greisen is married, and obtained an MBA degree from Northwestern University after his playing career ended. With that MBA, he signed on with Pro Financial Services as a sports insurance specialist.
