= Brooks Bollinger =

American football player (born 1979)

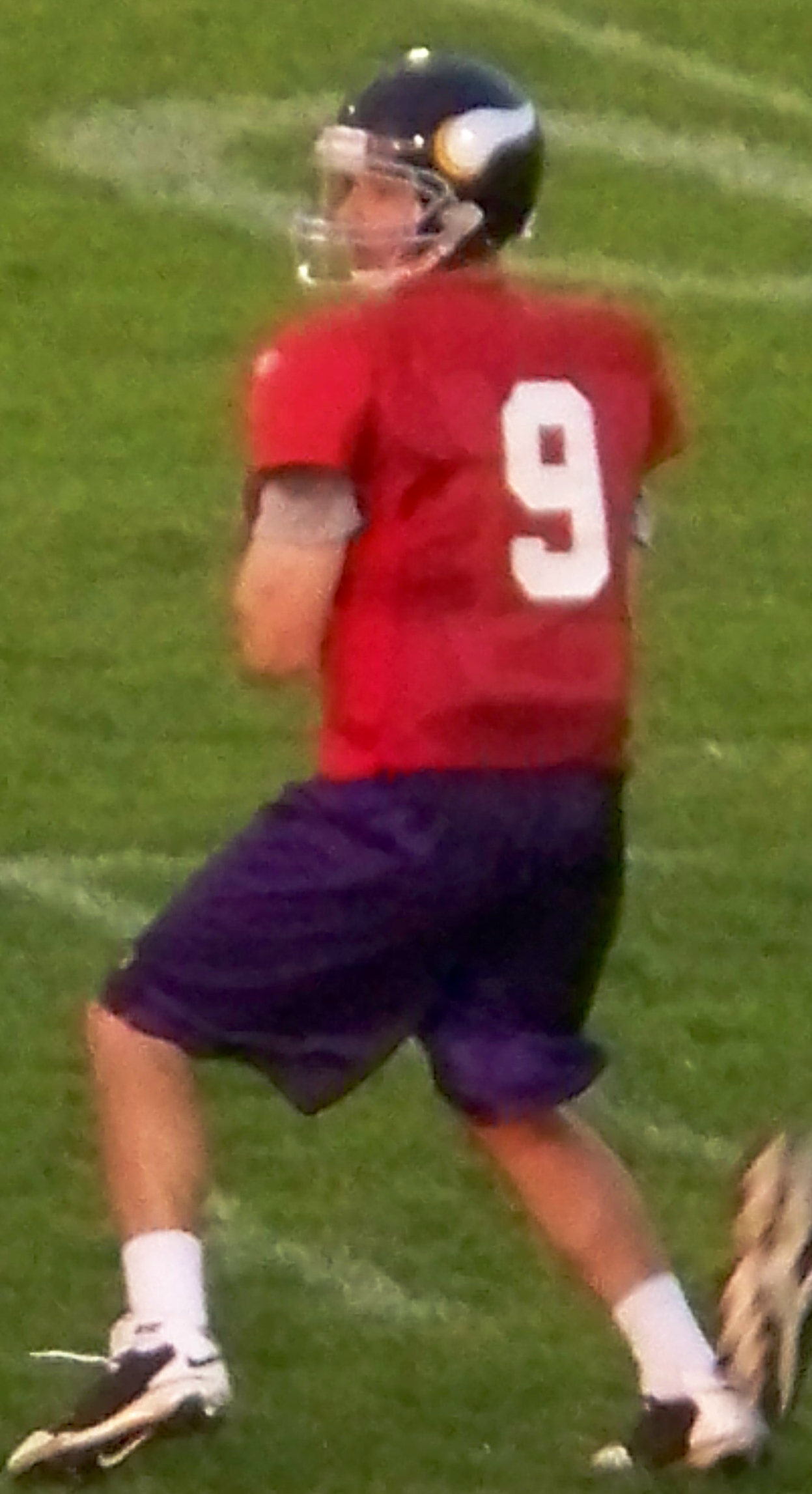
- Bollinger during Vikings training camp in 2008

No. 5, 9, 14, 8
- Position: Quarterback

Personal information
- Born: November 15, 1979 (age 46); Bismarck, North Dakota, U.S.
- Listed height: 6 ft 1 in (1.85 m)
- Listed weight: 205 lb (93 kg)

Career information
- High school: Central (Grand Forks, North Dakota)
- College: Wisconsin
- NFL draft: 2003: 6th round, 200th overall pick

Career history

Playing
- New York Jets (2003–2005); Minnesota Vikings (2006–2007); Dallas Cowboys (2008); Detroit Lions (2009)*; Florida Tuskers (2009–2010)
- * Offseason or practice squad member only

Coaching
- Pittsburgh (2012–2013) Quarterbacks coach; Cretin-Derham Hall High School (2015–2019) Head coach

Awards and highlights
- Big Ten Freshman of the Year (1999); UFL MVP (2009)

Career NFL statistics
- Passing attempts: 360
- Passing completions: 211
- Completion percentage: 58.6%
- TD–INT: 9–9
- Passing yards: 2,226
- Passer rating: 74.6
- Stats at Pro Football Reference

Brooks Michael Bollinger (born November 15, 1979) is an American former professional football player who was a quarterback in the National Football League (NFL) for the New York Jets, Minnesota Vikings, Dallas Cowboys and Detroit Lions. He was also a member of the Florida Tuskers in the United Football League (UFL). He played college football for the Wisconsin Badgers.

== Early life ==
Bollinger attended Grand Forks Central High School. He started in every game at quarterback during his four-year career, passing for 40 touchdowns and rushing for 19 more. He led the team to the state championship game as a junior in 1996. He was a two-time All-state quarterback and the Gatorade Player of the Year in North Dakota as a senior in 1997.

He was a three-year starter at point guard in basketball and contributed to the 1996 Class A state championship as a junior. He received All-state honors as a senior. He was a notable infielder on the Grand Forks Royals American Legion baseball team, before the school fielded a varsity team. He was the starter at shortstop in 1996 and 1997. He was drafted twice in 2000 and 2001 by the Los Angeles Dodgers baseball team, both times in the 50th round.

== College career ==
Bollinger accepted a football scholarship from the University of Wisconsin–Madison, where he was a four-year starting quarterback. In 2000, Bollinger, a redshirt freshman starter, assisted the Badgers in their second straight Rose Bowl victory along with teammate and Heisman Trophy winner Ron Dayne.

The following year, Bollinger played in the Sun Bowl and defeated the UCLA Bruins. In one of the University of Wisconsin school papers, The Badger Herald, a full front-page article praised the quarterback as a "Triple Threat." The accompanying three pictures of Bollinger showed him scrambling, handing off, and scrambling once again. During his third year, the Badgers could not match the success of the two previous seasons as they posted a 5–7 overall record and did not earn a bowl game berth.

Bollinger ended his collegiate career with an overtime victory over the Colorado Buffaloes in the Alamo Bowl. Bollinger finished with a 30–12 record as a starter at UW, a 3–0 bowl game record, and the school's rushing record for quarterbacks with 1,767 yards (twelfth overall in school history) and 26 touchdowns.

He was a four-year starter and set the school record with 1,289 plays over the course of his career. He finished third in the school's All-time list with 771 career pass attempts, 5,627 career passing yards, 414 completions, 38 passing touchdown passes and 64 total touchdowns. He finished second in school history with 7,394 combined passing and rushing yards.

In 2017, he was inducted into the University of Wisconsin Athletic Hall of Fame.

== Professional career ==
=== New York Jets ===
Bollinger was selected by the New York Jets in the sixth round (200th overall) of the 2003 NFL draft. Bollinger spent the entire year on the bench while Vinny Testaverde and Chad Pennington led the team as quarterbacks.

In 2004, his idle NFL career ended, when he replaced an injured Quincy Carter to take his first snap in an NFL game against Arizona. Bollinger completed 5 of 9 passes for 60 yards.

Bollinger did not play again until 2005, when first and second-string quarterbacks Chad Pennington and Jay Fiedler were both injured in a game against Jacksonville. These unfortunate series of events kickstarted Bollinger's career as the quarterback for the Jets. After the incident, Jets head coach Herman Edwards tried to bring experience at the quarterback position to the team by signing veteran quarterback Vinny Testaverde. The 41-year-old Testaverde failed to perform up to expectations and was benched for Bollinger. He finished with 9 starts, passing for 1,558 yards, 7 touchdowns and 6 interceptions.

=== Minnesota Vikings ===
Bollinger was traded to the Minnesota Vikings in 2006 for defensive tackle C. J. Mosley and a draft pick where he was reunited with new head coach Brad Childress, his offensive coordinator in college. After a game against the Chicago Bears in which Vikings starting quarterback Brad Johnson threw 4 interceptions, Bollinger came in and replaced him. He threw for 70 yards (with seven completions on nine attempts), before he was injured and replaced by rookie Tarvaris Jackson. The injury kept him sidelined through most of his 2006 season.

After some shaky preseason and early season relief efforts in 2007, Bollinger was listed as the 3rd string quarterback on the Minnesota Vikings depth chart. While keeping a positive focus for his team, in early November 2007 Bollinger was ready once again to play his part in the role of the starting quarterback position for an NFL team after yet another series of unfortunate incidents of injuries and failed performances by 1st and 2nd string quarterbacks Tarvaris Jackson and veteran Kelly Holcomb. Bollinger was able to start for the Vikings in week 10 against the Packers, but after a terrible performance by the Vikings in a 0–34 loss, Bollinger was listed as the 2nd string quarterback for week 11 with Jackson taking back the starting position.

In 2008, the Minnesota Vikings drafted USC quarterback John David Booty in the fifth round of the 2008 NFL draft. This meant that Bollinger would be fighting for a third string spot with Booty behind Tarvaris Jackson and veteran Gus Frerotte. After a disappointing preseason, Bollinger lost the third-string spot and was released by the Vikings on August 30, 2008.

=== Dallas Cowboys ===
On September 8, 2008, Bollinger was signed by the Dallas Cowboys after the team waived wide receiver Mike Jefferson. Bollinger was listed as the third-string quarterback, backing up starter Tony Romo and his backup Brad Johnson. During week 6 of the season, Romo injured a finger on his throwing hand, leaving him out for a few games. After some failed performances by the veteran Brad Johnson, Bollinger made his first appearance for the Cowboys in the second half of the week 9 game against the New York Giants. Bollinger had only been working with the Cowboys starting line for a week prior to the game. With heavy pressure by the Giants defensive line, his first pass play he threw an interception which contributed to one of the Giants touchdowns. As the Cowboys offensive line performed terribly, Bollinger was sacked a number of times in his next few drives. However, later that quarter and into the start of the 4th quarter, with the Giants letting up and after the removal of several starters, Bollinger subsequently managed to lead a 75-yard scoring drive against the Giant defense, which was ranked 1st in the league at the time. He threw his first touchdown as a Cowboy, a soft 9-yard pass to Terrell Owens.

With Romo returning the next game and remaining healthy enough to play, Bollinger did not see any action until week 17 against the Eagles to replace a badly beat up Romo, throwing 1 pass for 8 yards to rookie tight end Martellus Bennett, thus ending the 4th quarter and the season for the Cowboys. Bollinger was not re-signed by the Cowboys after the season.

=== Detroit Lions ===
On September 1, 2009, Bollinger signed a pre-season contract with the Detroit Lions. He was cut on September 5, after the final preseason game.

=== Florida Tuskers ===
Bollinger was selected by the Florida Tuskers in the UFL Premiere Season Draft. The Tuskers retained his UFL rights as he worked in the Detroit Lions training camp. He was signed by the Tuskers on September 22, 2009. In the 2009 season, he led the Tuskers to the championship game with a perfect 6–0 regular season record. Bollinger was the league leader in passing yards, passing touchdowns, completion percentage, and completed passes. Though the Tuskers lost the championship, Bollinger was named season MVP through an online and text message vote by fans.

Bollinger had a tough start in the 2010 UFL season, going 2–2 in the first half of the season, and then receiving rib, neck and thumb injuries during the Week 6 game against the Sacramento Mountain Lions. He would not play for the rest of the season as backup quarterback Chris Greisen took the Tuskers back to the UFL Championship, which they would later lose, once again to the Las Vegas Locomotives.

After the season, due to injuries, Bollinger decided to retire from professional football.

== Coaching career ==
In 2011, he was named the football head coach at Hill-Murray School in St. Paul and led them to the state tournament semifinals. In 2012, he became the quarterbacks coach at the University of Pittsburgh, but left the program to pursue non-coaching opportunities after the 2013 season.

On December 21, 2015, Bollinger was named the head football coach at Cretin-Derham Hall High School, after longtime coach Mike Scanlan resigned. In 2017, the school reached the Class 6A state semifinals in 2017. On February 26, 2019, he resigned as the football head coach to begin a fulltime career in the finance sector.
