= 2005 Wisconsin Badgers football team =

American college football season

2005 Wisconsin Badgers football

Capital One Bowl champion

Capital One Bowl, W 24–10 vs. Auburn
- Conference: Big Ten Conference

Ranking
- Coaches: No. 15
- AP: No. 15
- Record: 10–3 (5–3 Big Ten)
- Head coach: Barry Alvarez (16th season)
- Co-offensive coordinators: Brian White (7th season); Paul Chryst (1st season)
- Offensive scheme: Multiple
- Defensive coordinator: Bret Bielema (2nd season)
- Base defense: 4–3
- MVP: Brian Calhoun
- Captains: Brett Bell; Matt Bernstein; Donovan Raiola; Mark Zalewski
- Home stadium: Camp Randall Stadium

2005 Big Ten Conference football standings
	Conf.			Overall
Team	W		L	W		L
No. 3 Penn State $+	7	–	1	11	–	1
No. 4 Ohio State %+	7	–	1	10	–	2
No. 15 Wisconsin	5	–	3	10	–	3
Michigan	5	–	3	7	–	5
Northwestern	5	–	3	7	–	5
Iowa	5	–	3	7	–	5
Minnesota	4	–	4	7	–	5
Purdue	3	–	5	5	–	6
Michigan State	2	–	6	5	–	6
Indiana	1	–	7	4	–	7
Illinois	0	–	8	2	–	9
$ – BCS representative as conference champion; % – BCS at-large representative; + – Conference co-champions; Rankings from AP Poll

The 2005 Wisconsin Badgers football team was an American football team that represented the University of Wisconsin–Madison as a member of the Big Ten Conference during the 2005 NCAA Division I-A football season. In their 16th and final year under head coach Barry Alvarez, the Badgers compiled a 10–3 record (5–3 in conference games), finished in a four-way tie for third place in the Big Ten, and outscored opponents by a total of 446 to 309. Against ranked opponents, the Badgers defeated No. 14 Michigan and No. 22 Minnesota and lost to No. 10 Penn State. They concluded the season with a 24–10 victory over No. 7 Auburn in the Capital One Bowl. The Badgers were ranked No. 15 in the final AP and Coaches polls.

The team's statistical leaders included running back Brian Calhoun (1,636 rushing yards, 144 points scored), quarterback John Stocco (2,920 passing yards, 20 touchdowns, 150.48 passer rating), Brandon Williams (59 receptions for 1,095 yards), and linebacker Dontez Sanders (51 solo tackles, 95 total tackles).

The team played its home games at Camp Randall Stadium in Madison, Wisconsin.

== Schedule ==
Date	Time	Opponent	Rank	Site	TV	Result	Attendance
September 3	11:00 a.m.	Bowling Green*		Camp Randall Stadium; Madison, WI	ESPN	W 56–42	82,138
September 10	11:00 a.m.	Temple*		Camp Randall Stadium; Madison, WI	ESPNU	W 65–0	81,806
September 17	6:00 p.m.	at North Carolina*		Kenan Memorial Stadium; Chapel Hill, NC	ESPN2	W 14–5	60,000
September 24	5:00 p.m.	No. 14 Michigan		Camp Randall Stadium; Madison, WI	ESPN2	W 23–20	83,022
October 1	11:00 a.m.	Indiana	No. 17	Camp Randall Stadium; Madison, WI	ESPN2	W 41–24	82,330
October 8	11:00 a.m.	at Northwestern	No. 14	Ryan Field; Evanston, IL	ESPN	L 48–51	33,859
October 15	11:00 a.m.	at No. 22 Minnesota	No. 23	Hubert H. Humphrey Metrodome; Minneapolis, MN (rivalry)	ESPN	W 38–34	65,089
October 22	2:30 p.m.	Purdue	No. 19	Camp Randall Stadium; Madison, WI	ABC	W 31–20	82,828
October 29	11:00 a.m.	at Illinois	No. 15	Memorial Stadium; Champaign, IL	ESPN	W 41–24	52,158
November 5	2:30 p.m.	at No. 10 Penn State	No. 14	Beaver Stadium; University Park, PA	ABC	L 14–35	109,865
November 12	2:30 p.m.	Iowa	No. 19	Camp Randall Stadium; Madison, WI (rivalry)	ESPN	L 10–20	83,184
November 25	9:00 p.m.	at Hawaii*	No. 24	Aloha Stadium; Halawa, HI	ESPN2	W 41–24	34,031
January 2, 2006	12:00 p.m.	vs. No. 7 Auburn*	No. 21	Florida Citrus Bowl; Orlando, FL (Capital One Bowl)	ABC	W 24–10	57,221
*Non-conference game; Rankings from AP Poll released prior to the game; All times are in Central time

== Rankings ==
Ranking movements Legend: ██ Increase in ranking ██ Decrease in ranking RV = Received votes
	Week															
Poll	Pre	1	2	3	4	5	6	7	8	9	10	11	12	13	14	Final
AP	RV	RV	RV	RV	17	14	23	19	15	14	19	25	24	21	21	15
Coaches	RV	RV	RV	24	17	14	23	17	15	14	19	24	22	20	20	15
Harris	Not released				17	13	23	17	15	14	19	24	23	20	20	Not released
BCS	Not released							14	12	12	16	20	17	18	18	Not released

== Game summaries ==
=== Bowling Green ===
Bowling Green vs Wisconsin – Game summary

Quarter	1	2	3	4	Total
Falcons	13	22	0	7	42
Badgers	0	35	14	7	56

at Camp Randall Stadium

- Date: September 3, 2005
- Game time: 11:00 a.m.
- Game weather: 65 °F (18 °C); Sunny; Wind at W 0 MPH
- Game attendance: 82,138
- Referee: Nick Define
- TV announcers (ESPN): Mark Jones, Chris Spielman, Rob Stone

Game information

First quarter

- BGU – Corey Partridge 17-yard pass from Omar Jacobs (Joe Timchenko kick), 11:02. Bowling Green 7–0. Drive: 10 plays, 80 yards, 3:58.
- BGU – B.J. Lane 18-yard pass from Omar Jacobs (Joe Timchenko kick failed), 2:59. Bowling Green 13–0. Drive: 13 plays, 75 yards, 5:44.

Second quarter

- WIS – Jonathan Orr 21-yard pass from John Stocco (Taylor Mehlhaff kick), 14:56. Bowling Green 13–7. Drive: 7 plays, 76 yards, 2:59.
- BGU – Steve Sanders 63-yard pass from Omar Jacobs (Joe Timchenko kick), 14:33. Bowling Green 20–7. Drive: 2 plays, 63 yards, 0:16.
- WIS – Matt Bernstein 8-yard TD run (Taylor Mehlhaff kick), 14:17. Bowling Green 20–14. Drive: 1 plays, 8 yards, 0:04.
- WIS – Brian Calhoun 20-yard TD run (Taylor Mehlhaff kick), 7:32. Wisconsin 21–20. Drive: 6 plays, 45 yards, 3:03.
- WIS – Brian Calhoun 5-yard TD run (Taylor Mehlhaff kick), 5:30. Wisconsin 28–20. Drive: 4 plays, 48 yards, 1:07.
- BGU – B.J. Lane 5-yard TD run (Corey Partridge catch), 3:09. Tie 28–28. Drive: 7 plays, 77 yards, 2:14.
- WIS – Brian Calhoun 5-yard TD run (Taylor Mehlhaff kick), 0:41. Wisconsin 35–28. Drive: 8 plays, 73 yards, 2:23.
- BGU – Steve Sanders 10-yard pass from Omar Jacobs (Joe Timchenko kick), 0:04. Tie 35–35. Drive: 6 plays, 83 yards, 0:33.

Third quarter

- WIS – Brian Calhoun 1-yard TD run (Taylor Mehlhaff kick), 11:49. Wisconsin 42–35. Drive: 8 plays, 66 yards, 3:05.
- WIS – Stanley Booker 15-yard TD run (Taylor Mehlhaff kick), 2:54. Wisconsin 49–35. Drive: 11 plays, 58 yards, 5:39.

Fourth quarter

- WIS – Brian Calhoun 9-yard TD run (Taylor Mehlhaff kick), 12:33. Wisconsin 56–35. Drive: 9 plays, 61 yards, 4:56.
- BGU – Charles Sharon 20-yard pass from Omar Jacobs (Joe Timchenko kick), 10:16. Wisconsin 56–42. Drive: 7 plays, 80 yards, 2:17.

Top passers

- BGU – Omar Jacobs – 30/51, 458 yards, 5 TD, INT
- WIS – John Stocco – 8/10, 116 yards, TD, INT

Top rushers

- BGU – B.J. Lane – 12 rushes, 47 yards, TD
- WIS – Brian Calhoun – 43 rushes, 258 yards, 5 TD

Top receivers

- BGU – Steve Sanders – 6 receptions, 127 yards, 2 TD
- WIS – Jonathan Orr – 3 receptions, 38 yards, TD

Top defenders

- BGU – Deaudre Perry – 12 tackles
- WIS – Dontez Sanders – 10 tackles, 1.0 TFL

=== Temple ===
Temple vs Wisconsin – Game summary

Quarter	1	2	3	4	Total
Owls	0	0	0	0	0
Badgers	17	34	14	0	65

at Camp Randall Stadium

- Date: September 10, 2005
- Game time: 11:00 a.m.
- Game weather: 84 °F (29 °C); Sunny; Wind at SE 9 MPH
- Game attendance: 81,806
- Referee: Jim Lapetina
- TV announcers (ESPNU/ESPN+): Wayne Larrivee, John Congemi, Quint Kessenich

Game information

First quarter

- WIS – Taylor Mehlhaff 39-yard field goal, 13:18. Wisconsin 3–0. Drive: 5 plays, 28 yards, 1:42.
- WIS – Owen Daniels 6-yard pass from John Stocco (Taylor Mehlhaff kick), 9:13. Wisconsin 10–0. Drive: 6 plays, 58 yards, 1:54.
- WIS – Brian Calhoun 1-yard TD run (Taylor Mehlhaff kick), 2:22. Wisconsin 17–0. Drive: 9 plays, 51 yards, 5:49.

Second quarter

- WIS – Owen Daniels 11-yard pass from John Stocco (Taylor Mehlhaff kick), 13:20. Wisconsin 24–0. Drive: 5 plays, 51 yards, 2:21.
- WIS – Brandon Williams 66-yard punt return (Taylor Mehlhaff kick failed), 12:08. Wisconsin 30–0.
- WIS – Owen Daniels 15-yard pass from John Stocco (Taylor Mehlhaff kick), 6:32. Wisconsin 37–0. Drive: 14 plays, 87 yards, 4:30.
- WIS – Dywon Rowan 2-yard TD run (Taylor Mehlhaff kick), 1:57. Wisconsin 44–0. Drive: 5 plays, 24 yards, 2:09.
- WIS – Marc Randle El 29-yard pass from Tyler Donovan (Taylor Mehlhaff kick), 0:14. Wisconsin 51–0. Drive: 3 plays, 52 yards, 1:03.

Third quarter

- WIS – Tyler Donovan 10-yard TD run (Taylor Mehlhaff kick), 11:37. Wisconsin 58–0. Drive: 6 plays, 25 yards, 1:49.
- WIS – Jamil Walker 12-yard TD run (Taylor Mehlhaff kick), 4:10. Wisconsin 65–0. Drive: 6 plays, 61 yards, 3:38.

Fourth quarter

No scoring

Top passers

- TEM – Mike McGann – 4/20, 38 yards, INT
- WIS – John Stocco – 12/19, 180 yards, 3 TD

Top rushers

- TEM – Umar Ferguson – 12 rushes, 32 yards
- WIS – Jamil Walker – 13 rushes, 79 yards, TD

Top receivers

- TEM – Jamel Harris – 3 receptions, 27 yards
- WIS – Owen Daniels – 6 receptions, 88 yards, 3 TD

Top defenders

- TEM – Manuel Tapia – 12 tackles, pass breakup
- WIS – Mike Newkirk – 5 tackles, 1.0 TFL

=== North Carolina ===
Wisconsin vs North Carolina – Game summary

Quarter	1	2	3	4	Total
Badgers	7	0	0	7	14
Tar Heels	0	3	0	2	5

at Kenan Memorial Stadium

- Date: September 17, 2005
- Game time: 6:00 p.m.
- Game weather: 88 °F (31 °C); Partly Cloudy; Wind at WSW 5 MPH
- Game attendance: 60,000
- Referee: Dennis Lipski
- TV announcers (ESPN2): Dave Barnett, Mike Gottfried, Dave Ryan

Game information

First quarter

- WIS – Brian Calhoun 8-yard TD run (Taylor Mehlhaff kick), 0:57. Wisconsin 7–0. Drive: 8 plays, 45 yards, 3:12.

Second quarter

- UNC – Connor Barth 43-yard field goal, 2:08. Wisconsin 7–3. Drive: 5 plays, 27 yards, 2:08.

Third quarter

No Scoring

Fourth quarter

- WIS – Brian Calhoun 4-yard TD run (Taylor Mehlhaff kick), 7:12. Wisconsin 14–3. Drive: 8 plays, 67 yards, 4:00.
- UNC – TEAM 4-yard safety, 0:00. Wisconsin 14–5.

Top passers

- UNC – Matt Baker – 16/37, 281 yards, INT
- WIS – John Stocco – 14/23, 138 yards

Top rushers

- UNC – Barrington Edwards – 11 rushes, 37 yards
- WIS – Brian Calhoun – 38 rushes, 171 yards, 2 TD

Top receivers

- UNC – Jesse Holley – 5 receptions, 90 yards
- WIS – Brandon Williams – 5 receptions, 62 yards

Top defenders

- UNC – Tommy Richardson – 8 tackles, 1.0 TFL
- WIS – Joe Stellmacher – 11 tackles, 0.5 TFL

=== Michigan ===
Michigan vs Wisconsin – Game summary

Quarter	1	2	3	4	Total
No. 14 Wolverines	0	13	0	7	20
Badgers	0	3	3	17	23

at Camp Randall Stadium

- Date: September 24, 2005
- Game time: 5:00 p.m.
- Game weather: 66 °F (19 °C); Light rain; Wind at S 10 MPH
- Game attendance: 83,022
- Referee: Dave Witvoet
- TV announcers (ESPN2): Sean McDonough, Mike Gottfried, Alex Flanagan

Game information

First quarter

No scoring

Second quarter

- MIC – Garrett Rivas 44-yard field goal, 9:44. Michigan 3–0. Drive: 8 plays, 32 yards, 2:44.
- MIC – Jason Avant 4-yard pass from Chad Henne (Garrett Rivas kick), 4:27. Michigan 10–0. Drive: 9 plays, 71 yards, 3:37.
- WIS – Taylor Mehlhaff 35-yard field goal, 1:17. Michigan 10–3. Drive: 11 plays, 57 yards, 3:04.
- MIC – Garrett Rivas 28-yard field goal, 0:04. Michigan 13–3. Drive: 8 plays, 53 yards, 1:07.

Third quarter

- WIS – Taylor Mehlhaff 43-yard field goal, 8:59. Michigan 13–6. Drive: 11 plays, 37 yards, 5:02.

Fourth quarter

- WIS – Taylor Mehlhaff 27-yard field goal, 12:47. Michigan 13–9. Drive: 15 plays, 64 yards, 4:35.
- WIS – Brian Calhoun 6-yard TD run (Taylor Mehlhaff kick), 11:34. Wisconsin 16–13. Drive: 2 plays, 12 yards, 0:46.
- MIC – Mario Manningham 49-yard pass from Chad Henne (Garrett Rivas kick), 9:03. Michigan 20–16. Drive: 3 plays, 61 yards, 1:14.
- WIS – John Stocco 4-yard TD run (Taylor Mehlhaff kick), 0:24. Wisconsin 23–20. Drive: 11 plays, 52 yards, 4:05.

Top passers

- MIC – Chad Henne – 16/34, 258 yards, 2 TD, INT
- WIS – John Stocco – 15/32, 147 yards, INT

Top rushers

- MIC – Max Martin – 16 rushes, 91 yards
- WIS – Brian Calhoun – 35 rushes, 155 yards, TD

Top receivers

- MIC – Jason Avant – 7 receptions, 108 yards, TD
- WIS – Brian Calhoun – 7 receptions, 59 yards

Top defenders

- MIC – LaMarr Woodley – 8 tackles, 2.0 TFL, 0.5 sack, forced fumble
- WIS – Mark Zalewski – 11 tackles, fumble recovery

=== Indiana ===
Indiana vs Wisconsin – Game summary

Quarter	1	2	3	4	Total
Hoosiers	7	10	0	7	24
No. 17 Badgers	17	14	3	7	41

at Camp Randall Stadium

- Date: October 1, 2005
- Game time: 11:00 a.m.
- Game weather: 67 °F (19 °C); Sunny; Wind at SW 8 MPH
- Game attendance: 82,330
- Referee: Bill LeMonnier
- TV announcers (ESPN2): Pam Ward, David Norrie, Jimmy Dykes

Game information

First quarter

- WIS – Brandon Williams 17-yard pass from John Stocco (Taylor Mehlhaff kick), 8:41. Wisconsin 7–0. Drive: 6 plays, 72 yards, 2:26.
- IND – James Hardy 83-yard pass from Blake Powers (Joe Kleinsmith kick), 7:48. Tie 7–7. Drive: 3 plays, 80 yards, 0:53.
- WIS – Taylor Mehlhaff 38-yard field goal, 3:38. Wisconsin 10–7. Drive: 11 plays, 58 yards, 4:05.
- WIS – Brandon Williams 63-yard punt return (Taylor Mehlhaff kick), 1:39. Wisconsin 17–7.

Second quarter

- WIS – Brandon Williams 13-yard pass from John Stocco (Taylor Mehlhaff kick), 14:15. Wisconsin 24–7. Drive: 3 plays, 27 yards, 1:21.
- IND – James Bailey 46-yard pass from Blake Powers (Joe Kleinsmith kick), 2:54. Wisconsin 24–14. Drive: 5 plays, 70 yards, 1:14.
- WIS – Brian Calhoun 1-yard TD run (Taylor Mehlhaff kick), 0:20. Wisconsin 31–14. Drive: 6 plays, 81 yards, 2:25.
- IND – Joe Kleinsmith 34-yard field goal, 0:00. Wisconsin 31–17. Drive: 2 plays, 33 yards, 0:15.

Third quarter

- WIS – Taylor Mehlhaff 43-yard field goal, 7:06. Wisconsin 34–17. Drive: 4 plays, 8 yards, 2:09.

Fourth quarter

- WIS – Jonathan Orr 22-yard pass from John Stocco (Taylor Mehlhaff kick), 7:06. Wisconsin 41–17. Drive: 6 plays, 80 yards, 2:21.
- IND – James Hardy 7-yard pass from Blake Powers (Joe Kleinsmith kick), 1:22. Wisconsin 41–24. Drive: 17 plays, 73 yards, 5:37.

Top passers

- IND – Blake Powers – 20/41, 244 yards, 3 TD, 2 INT
- WIS – John Stocco – 13/24, 274 yards, 3 TD, 2 INT

Top rushers

- IND – Chris Taylor – 10 rushes, 35 yards
- WIS – Brian Calhoun – 26 rushes, 101 yards, TD

Top receivers

- IND – James Hardy – 7 receptions, 157 yards, 2 TD
- WIS – Brandon Williams – 6 receptions, 113 yards, 2 TD

Top defenders

- IND – Tracy Porter – 7 tackles, INT
- WIS – Dontez Sanders – 11 tackles, 0.5 TFL

=== Northwestern ===
Wisconsin vs Northwestern – Game summary

Quarter	1	2	3	4	Total
No. 14 Badgers	7	10	10	21	48
Wildcats	0	10	27	14	51

at Ryan Field

- Date: October 8, 2005
- Game time: 11:00 a.m.
- Game weather: 54 °F (12 °C); Overcast; Wind at NE 17 MPH
- Game attendance: 33,859
- Referee: Dan Capron
- TV announcers (ESPN): Pam Ward, David Norrie, Jimmy Dykes

Game information

First quarter

- WIS – Jonathan Orr 15-yard pass from John Stocco (Taylor Mehlhaff kick), 8:47. Wisconsin 7–0. Drive: 4 plays, 31 yards, 1:23.

Second quarter

- NU – Brett Basanez 4-yard TD run (Joel Howells kick), 12:25. Tie 7–7. Drive: 9 plays, 53 yards, 2:51.
- WIS – Booker Stanley 5-yard TD run (Taylor Mehlhaff kick), 6:36. Wisconsin 14–7. Drive: 12 plays, 71 yards, 5:49.
- WIS – Taylor Mehlhaff 27-yard field goal, 1:59. Wisconsin 17–7. Drive: 9 plays, 37 yards, 2:42.
- NU – Joel Howells 21-yard field goal, 0:04. Wisconsin 17–10. Drive: 8 plays, 75 yards, 1:55.

Third quarter

- NU – Mark Philmore 4-yard pass from Brett Basanez (Joel Howells kick blocked), 12:43. Wisconsin 17–16. Drive: 7 plays, 80 yards, 2:17.
- NU – Tyrell Sutton 1-yard TD run (Joel Howells kick), 5:52. Northwestern 23–17. Drive: 12 plays, 73 yards, 4:35.
- WIS – Taylor Mehlhaff 46-yard field goal, 3:34. Northwestern 23–20. Drive: 7 plays, 45 yards, 2:18.
- NU – Kim Thompson 52-yard pass from Brett Basanez (Joel Howells kick), 2:22. Northwestern 30–20. Drive: 5 plays, 80 yards, 1:12.
- WIS – Brian Calhoun 1-yard TD run (Taylor Mehlhaff kick), 1:15. Northwestern 30–27. Drive: 5 plays, 72 yards, 1:07.
- NU – Tyrell Sutton 14-yard TD run (Joel Howells kick), 0:47. Northwestern 37–27. Drive: 2 plays, 14 yards, 0:28.

Fourth quarter

- WIS – Jonathan Orr 9-yard pass from John Stocco (Taylor Mehlhaff kick), 14:13. Northwestern 37–34. Drive: 5 plays, 58 yards, 1:34.
- NU – Tyrell Sutton 9-yard pass from Brett Basanez (Joel Howells kick), 9:44. Northwestern 44–34. Drive: 10 plays, 85 yards, 4:29.
- NU – Tyrell Sutton 62-yard TD run (Joel Howells kick), 4:22. Northwestern 51–34. Drive: 6 plays, 97 yards, 3:06.
- WIS – Jonathan Orr 13-yard pass from John Stocco (Taylor Mehlhaff kick), 3:53. Northwestern 51–41. Drive: 3 plays, 66 yards, 0:29.
- WIS – Jonathan Orr 21-yard pass from John Stocco (Taylor Mehlhaff kick), 2:48. Northwestern 51–48. Drive: 4 plays, 55 yards, 0:43.

Top passers

- NU – Brett Basanez – 26/36, 361 yards, 3 TD
- WIS – John Stocco – 24/31, 326 yards, 4 TD, 2 INT

Top rushers

- NU – Tyrell Sutton – 29 rushes, 244 yards, 3 TD
- WIS – Brian Calhoun – 23 rushes, 122 yards, TD

Top receivers

- NU – Mark Philmore – 6 receptions, 97 yards, TD
- WIS – Jonathan Orr – 5 receptions, 87 yards, 4 TD

Top defenders

- NU – Tim McGarigle – 25 tackles, 3.5 TFL, 2 sacks
- WIS – Nick Hayden – 10 tackles

=== Minnesota ===
Wisconsin vs Minnesota – Game summary

Quarter	1	2	3	4	Total
No. 23 Badgers	7	3	7	21	38
No. 22 Golden Gophers	0	10	17	7	34

at Hubert H. Humphrey Metrodome

- Date: October 15, 2005
- Game time: 11:00 a.m.
- Game weather: 54 °F (12 °C); Overcast; Wind at NE 17 MPH
- Game attendance: 65,089
- Referee: Dennis Lipski
- TV announcers (ESPN): Mark Jones, Chris Spielman, Dave Ryan

Game information

First quarter

- WIS – Brian Calhoun 1-yard TD run (Taylor Mehlhaff kick), 0:25. Wisconsin 7–0. Drive: 7 plays, 68 yards, 3:22.

Second quarter

- MIN – Matt Spaeth 4-yard pass from Tony Mortensen (Jason Giannini kick), 9:54. Tie 7–7. Drive: 12 plays, 80 yards, 5:31.
- WIS – Taylor Mehlhaff 44-yard field goal, 6:14. Wisconsin 10–7. Drive: 8 plays, 40 yards, 3:40.
- MIN – Jason Giannini 25-yard field goal, 0:00. Tie 10–10. Drive: 8 plays, 50 yards, 3:19.

Third quarter

- MIN – Laurence Maroney 93-yard TD run (Jason Giannini kick), 12:26. Minnesota 17–10. Drive: 2 plays, 94 yards, 0:50.
- MIN – Jason Giannini 49-yard field goal, 8:30. Minnesota 20–10. Drive: 8 plays, 20 yards, 2:48.
- WIS – Brian Calhoun 17-yard TD run (Taylor Mehlhaff kick), 3:55. Minnesota 20–17. Drive: 11 plays, 69 yards, 4:35.
- MIN – Gary Russell 37-yard TD run (Jason Giannini kick), 3:22. Minnesota 27–17. Drive: 3 plays, 80 yards, 0:33.

Fourth quarter

- WIS – Brian Calhoun 1-yard TD run (Taylor Mehlhaff kick), 11:15. Minnesota 27–24. Drive: 4 plays, 43 yards, 1:24.
- MIN – Gary Russell 1-yard TD run (Jason Giannini kick), 3:27. Minnesota 34–24. Drive: 19 plays, 80 yards, 7:48.
- WIS – Brandon Williams 21-yard pass from John Stocco (Taylor Mehlhaff kick), 2:10. Minnesota 34–31. Drive: 7 plays, 71 yards, 1:17.
- WIS – Ben Strickland 0-yard blocked punt return (Taylor Mehlhaff kick), 0:30. Wisconsin 38–34.

Top passers

- MIN – Tony Mortensen – 7/17, 99 yards, TD, INT
- WIS – John Stocco – 15/26, 235 yards, TD

Top rushers

- MIN – Laurence Maroney – 43 rushes, 258 yards, TD
- WIS – Brian Calhoun – 23 rushes, 110 yards, 3 TD

Top receivers

- MIN – Logan Payne – 2 receptions, 24 yards
- WIS – Brandon Williams – 7 receptions, 121 yards, TD

Top defenders

- MIN – Trumaine Banks – 11 tackles, 2.0 TFL, 2 pass breakups
- WIS – Joe Stellmacher – 14 tackles

=== Purdue ===
Purdue vs Wisconsin – Game summary

Quarter	1	2	3	4	Total
Boilermakers	0	10	3	7	20
No. 19 Badgers	10	0	14	7	31

at Camp Randall Stadium

- Date: October 22, 2005
- Game time: 2:30 p.m.
- Game weather: 47 °F (8 °C); Partly cloudy; Wind at NW 8 MPH
- Game attendance: 82,828
- Referee: Bill LeMonnier
- TV announcers (ABC): Gary Thorne, Ed Cunningham, Dave LaMont

Game information

First quarter

- WIS – Brian Calhoun 23-yard pass from John Stocco (Taylor Mehlhaff kick), 12:14. Wisconsin 7–0. Drive: 7 plays, 85 yards, 2:46.
- WIS – Taylor Mehlhaff 29-yard field goal, 1:57. Wisconsin 10–0. Drive: 10 plays, 49 yards, 4:23.

Second quarter

- PUR – Curtis Painter 4-yard TD run (Ben Jones kick), 12:42. Wisconsin 10–7. Drive: 12 plays, 80 yards, 4:15.
- PUR – Ben Jones 24-yard field goal, 0:56. Tie 10–10. Drive: 4 plays, 4 yards, 1:28.

Third quarter

- PUR – Ben Jones 50-yard field goal, 8:08. Purdue 13–10. Drive: 10 plays, 34 yards, 4:39.
- WIS – Roderick Rogers 84-yard interception return (Taylor Mehlhaff kick), 4:33. Wisconsin 17–13.
- WIS – Brian Calhoun 40-yard pass from John Stocco (Taylor Mehlhaff kick), 2:39. Wisconsin 24–13. Drive: 3 plays, 63 yards, 0:53.

Fourth quarter

- WIS – Jack Ikegwuonu 62-yard interception return (Taylor Mehlhaff kick), 3:21. Wisconsin 31–13.
- PUR – Dustin Keller 4-yard pass from Curtis Painter (Ben Jones kick), 0:03. Wisconsin 31–20. Drive: 14 plays, 70 yards, 3:10.

Top passers

- PUR – Curtis Painter – 23/44, 212 yards, TD, 3 INT
- WIS – John Stocco – 15/26, 217 yards, 2 TD, INT

Top rushers

- PUR – Curtis Painter – 11 rushes, 60 yards, TD
- WIS – Brian Calhoun – 20 rushes, 62 yards

Top receivers

- PUR – Dustin Keller – 3 receptions, 21 yards, TD
- WIS – Brian Calhoun – 5 receptions, 78 yards, 2 TD

Top defenders

- PUR – Stanford Keglar – 9 tackles, fumble recovery
- WIS – Joe Stellmacher – 10 tackles, forced fumble, 2 pass breakups

=== Illinois ===
Wisconsin vs Illinois – Game summary

Quarter	1	2	3	4	Total
No. 15 Badgers	13	7	14	7	41
Fighting Illini	7	3	7	7	24

at Memorial Stadium

- Date: October 29, 2005
- Game time: 11:00 p.m.
- Game weather: 53 °F (12 °C); Sunny; Wind at SSW 12 MPH
- Game attendance: 52,158
- Referee: Dan Capron
- TV announcers (ESPN): Mark Jones, Chris Spielman, Rob Stone

Game information

First quarter

- WIS – Brian Calhoun 6-yard TD run (Taylor Mehlhaff kick failed), 10:50. Wisconsin 6–0. Drive: 11 plays, 80 yards, 4:10.
- WIS – Brandon Williams 62-yard pass from John Stocco (Taylor Mehlhaff kick), 6:52. Wisconsin 13–0. Drive: 5 plays, 83 yards, 2:11.
- ILL – Melvin Bryant 4-yard pass from Tim Brasic (Jason Reda kick), 1:59. Wisconsin 13–7. Drive: 4 plays, 68 yards, 1:29.

Second quarter

- ILL – Jason Reda 23-yard field goal, 7:42. Wisconsin 13–10. Drive: 13 plays, 64 yards, 4:09.
- WIS – Brian Calhoun 2-yard TD run (Taylor Mehlhaff kick), 5:35. Wisconsin 20–10. Drive: 7 plays, 51 yards, 2:07.

Third quarter

- WIS – Brian Calhoun 6-yard TD run (Taylor Mehlhaff kick), 12:53. Wisconsin 27–10. Drive: 2 plays, 8 yards, 0:42.
- ILL – Pierre Thomas 3-yard TD run (Jason Reda kick), 4:28. Wisconsin 27–17. Drive: 5 plays, 73 yards, 1:37.
- WIS – Brian Calhoun 6-yard TD run (Taylor Mehlhaff kick), 0:04. Wisconsin 34–17. Drive: 12 plays, 68 yards, 4:24.

Fourth quarter

- ILL – Kyle Hudson 32-yard pass from Tim Brasic (Jason Reda kick), 4:07. Wisconsin 34–24. Drive: 5 plays, 74 yards, 1:09.
- WIS – Brian Calhoun 46-yard TD run (Taylor Mehlhaff kick), 3:54. Wisconsin 41–24. Drive: 1 plays, 46 yards, 0:13.

Top passers

- ILL – Tim Brasic – 20/39, 277 yards, 2 TD, INT
- WIS – John Stocco – 14/22, 225 yards, TD

Top rushers

- ILL – Tim Brasic – 16 rushes, 116 yards
- WIS – Brian Calhoun – 35 rushes, 197 yards, 5 TD

Top receivers

- ILL – Kyle Hudson – 10 receptions, 114 yards, TD
- WIS – Brandon Williams – 3 receptions, 88 yards, TD

Top defenders

- ILL – Kevin Mitchell – 12 tackles, 0.5 TFL, pass breakup, 2 QB hurries
- WIS – Joe Stellmacher – 12 tackles, INT

=== Penn State ===
Wisconsin vs Penn State – Game summary

Quarter	1	2	3	4	Total
No. 14 Badgers	0	0	0	14	14
No. 10 Nittany Lions	7	14	0	14	35

at Beaver Stadium

- Date: November 5, 2005
- Game time: 2:30 p.m.
- Game weather: 63 °F (17 °C); Mostly sunny; Wind at SSW 10-15 MPH
- Game attendance: 109,865
- Referee: T. Geerlings
- TV announcers (ABC): Brent Musburger, Gary Danielson, Jack Arute

Game information

First quarter

- PSU – Deon Butler 43-yard pass from Michael Robinson (Kevin Kelly kick), 13:22. Penn State 7–0. Drive: 5 plays, 78 yards, 1:38.

Second quarter

- PSU – Tony Hunt 9-yard TD run (Kevin Kelly kick), 14:56. Penn State 14–0. Drive: 11 plays, 81 yards, 4:00.
- PSU – BranDon Snow 3-yard TD run (Kevin Kelly kick), 7:29. Penn State 21–0. Drive: 7 plays, 80 yards, 2:29.

Third quarter

No scoring

Fourth quarter

- WIS – Brian Calhoun 1-yard TD run (Taylor Mehlhaff kick), 12:27. Penn State 21–7. Drive: 7 plays, 89 yards, 3:01.
- PSU – Deon Butler 47-yard pass from Michael Robinson (Kevin Kelly kick), 6:17. Penn State 28–7. Drive: 5 plays, 69 yards, 2:03.
- WIS – Brandon White 18-yard pass from John Stocco (Taylor Mehlhaff kick), 5:13. Penn State 28–14. Drive: 4 plays, 81 yards, 0:57.
- PSU – Tony Hunt 10-yard TD run (Kevin Kelly kick), 2:47. Penn State 35–14. Drive: 5 plays, 46 yards, 2:25.

Top passers

- PSU – Michael Robinson – 13/28, 238 yards, 2 TD, 2 INT
- WIS – John Stocco – 19/34, 313 yards, TD, 2 INT

Top rushers

- PSU – Tony Hunt – 24 rushes, 151 yards, 2 TD
- WIS – Brian Calhoun – 20 rushes, 38 yards, TD

Top receivers

- PSU – Deon Butler – 5 receptions, 125 yards, 2 TD
- WIS – Brandon Williams – 5 receptions, 102 yards

Top defenders

- PSU – Tamba Hali – 9 tackles, 5.0 TFL, 4 sacks
- WIS – Joe Stellmacher – 12 tackles

=== Iowa ===
Iowa vs Wisconsin – Game summary

Quarter	1	2	3	4	Total
Hawkeyes	0	3	14	3	20
No. 19 Badgers	10	0	0	0	10

at Camp Randall Stadium

- Date: November 12, 2005
- Game time: 2:30 p.m.
- Game weather: 62 °F (17 °C); Cloudy; Wind at S 15 MPH
- Game attendance: 83,184
- Referee: Dennis Lipski
- TV announcers (ESPN): Mark Jones, Chris Spielman, Erin Andrews

Game information

First quarter

- WIS – Brandon Williams 17-yard pass from John Stocco (Taylor Mehlhaff kick), 7:11. Wisconsin 7–0. Drive: 4 plays, 32 yards, 1:32.
- WIS – Taylor Mehlhaff 24-yard field goal, 0:47. Wisconsin 10–0. Drive: 12 plays, 59 yards, 4:43.

Second quarter

- IOW – Kyle Schlicher 35-yard field goal, 11:00. Wisconsin 10–3. Drive: 14 plays, 64 yards, 4:42.

Third quarter

- IOW – Champ Davis 6-yard pass from Drew Tate (Kyle Schlicher kick), 10:11. Tie 10–10. Drive: 8 plays, 75 yards, 2:20.
- IOW – Ryan Majerus 13-yard pass from Drew Tate (Kyle Schlicher kick), 1:11. Iowa 17–10. Drive: 7 plays, 80 yards, 2:33.

Fourth quarter

- IOW – Kyle Schlicher 32-yard field goal, 9:21. Iowa 20–10. Drive: 8 plays, 47 yards, 2:38.

Top passers

- IOW – Drew Tate – 21/34, 224 yards, 2 TD, INT
- WIS – John Stocco – 21/38, 257 yards, TD

Top rushers

- IOW – Albert Young – 26 rushes, 127 yards
- WIS – Brian Calhoun – 15 rushes, 18 yards

Top receivers

- IOW – Clinton Solomon – 5 receptions, 77 yards
- WIS – Brandon Williams – 9 receptions, 132 yards, TD

Top defenders

- IOW – Chad Greenway – 12 tackles, 1.0 TFL
- WIS – Joe Stellmacher – 10 tackles, INT, pass breakup

=== Hawaii ===
Wisconsin vs Hawaii – Game summary

Quarter	1	2	3	4	Total
No. 24 Badgers	14	10	10	7	41
Warriors	7	3	7	7	24

at Aloha Stadium

- Date: November 25, 2005
- Game time: 9:00 p.m.
- Game weather: 80 °F (27 °C); Sunny; Wind at S 10 MPH
- Game attendance: 34,031
- Referee: Jay Stricherz
- TV announcers (ESPN2): Dave Pasch, Rod Gilmore, Trevor Matich, Stacey Dales

Game information

First quarter

- WIS – Brian Calhoun 10-yard TD run (Taylor Mehlhaff kick), 6:12. Wisconsin 7–0. Drive: 7 plays, 77 yards, 2:50.
- HAW – Davone Bess 3-yard pass from Colt Brennan (Dan Kelly kick), 4:42. Tie 7–7. Drive: 7 plays, 80 yards, 1:30.
- WIS – Jonathan Orr 23-yard pass from John Stocco (Taylor Mehlhaff kick), 2:41. Wisconsin 14–7. Drive: 5 plays, 58 yards, 2:01.

Second quarter

- WIS – Taylor Mehlhaff 24-yard field goal, 9:53. Wisconsin 17–7. Drive: 11 plays, 75 yards, 5:43.
- WIS – Jonathan Orr 17-yard pass from John Stocco (Taylor Mehlhaff kick), 2:18. Wisconsin 24–7. Drive: 9 plays, 71 yards, 3:08.
- HAW – Dan Kelly 42-yard field goal, 0:17. Wisconsin 24–10. Drive: 9 plays, 60 yards, 2:01.

Third quarter

- WIS – Taylor Mehlhaff 24-yard field goal, 12:29. Wisconsin 27–10. Drive: 4 plays, 1 yards, 1:28.
- HAW – Davone Bess 8-yard pass from Colt Brennan (Dan Kelly kick), 8:08. Wisconsin 27–17. Drive: 9 plays, 80 yards, 4:21.
- WIS – John Stocco 1-yard TD run (Taylor Mehlhaff kick), 1:30. Wisconsin 34–17. Drive: 12 plays, 74 yards, 6:38.

Fourth quarter

- WIS – Booker Stanley 6-yard TD run (Taylor Mehlhaff kick), 8:56. Wisconsin 41–17. Drive: 10 plays, 41 yards, 5:55.
- HAW – Aaron Bain 6-yard pass from Colt Brennan (Dan Kelly kick), 0:11. Wisconsin 41–24. Drive: 7 plays, 28 yards, 1:08.

Top passers

- HAW – Colt Brennan – 33/53, 403 yards, 3 TD, INT
- WIS – John Stocco – 12/16, 191 yards, 2 TD

Top rushers

- HAW – Nate Ilaoa – 7 rushes, 68 yards
- WIS – Brian Calhoun – 29 rushes, 149 yards, TD

Top receivers

- HAW – Ryan Grice-Mullen – 11 receptions, 139 yards
- WIS – Jonathan Orr – 3 receptions, 60 yards, 2 TD

Top defenders

- HAW – Kila Kamakawiwo'ole – 10 tackles, 1.0 TFL
- WIS – Mark Zalewski – 8 tackles, 0.5 TFL, 0.5 sack

=== Auburn ===
Wisconsin vs Auburn – Game summary

Quarter	1	2	3	4	Total
No. 21 Badgers	10	7	0	7	24
No. 7 Tigers	0	0	3	7	10

at Florida Citrus Bowl

- Date: January 2, 2006
- Game time: 12:00 p.m.
- Game weather: 73 °F (23 °C); Overcast; Wind at S 5 MPH
- Game attendance: 57,221
- Referee: Ron Cherry
- TV announcers (ABC): Ron Franklin, Bob Davie, Holly Rowe

Game information

First quarter

- WIS – Brandon Williams 30-yard pass from John Stocco (Taylor Mehlhaff kick), 7:55. Wisconsin 7–0. Drive: 5 plays, 75 yards, 0:57.
- WIS – Taylor Mehlhaff 19-yard field goal, 0:21. Wisconsin 10–0. Drive: 7 plays, 71 yards, 3:18.

Second quarter

- WIS – Owen Daniels 13-yard pass from John Stocco (Taylor Mehlhaff kick), 7:19. Wisconsin 17–0. Drive: 12 plays, 86 yards, 5:06.

Third quarter

- AUB – John Vaughn 19-yard field goal, 11:54. Wisconsin 17–3. Drive: 6 plays, 16 yards, 1:29.

Fourth quarter

- AUB – Courtney Taylor 9-yard pass from Brandon Cox (John Vaughn kick), 14:49. Wisconsin 17–10. Drive: 14 plays, 56 yards, 5:14.
- WIS – Brian Calhoun 33-yard TD run (Taylor Mehlhaff kick), 13:22. Wisconsin 24–10. Drive: 5 plays, 65 yards, 1:27.

Top passers

- AUB – Brandon Cox – 15/33, 137 yards, TD, INT
- WIS – John Stocco – 15/27, 301 yards, 2 TD

Top rushers

- AUB – Kenny Irons – 22 rushes, 88 yards
- WIS – Brian Calhoun – 30 rushes, 213 yards, TD

Top receivers

- AUB – Ben Obomanu – 5 receptions, 62 yards
- WIS – Brandon Williams – 6 receptions, 173 yards, TD

Top defenders

- AUB – David Irons – 11 tackles, pass breakup
- WIS – Mark Zalewski – 8 tackles, 0.2.0 TFL, sack

== Personnel ==
=== Roster ===
2005 Wisconsin Badgers football team roster
Players
Coaches
Offense

Pos.	#	Name	Class
FB	45	Matt Bernstein (C)	Sr
RB	2	Brian Calhoun	Sr
TE	11	Owen Daniels	Sr
TE	48	Garrett Graham	Fr
FB	39	P. J. Hill	Fr
WR	19	Paul Hubbard	So
TE	82	Sean Lewis	Fr
WR	9	Jonathan Orr	Sr
TE	84	Jason Pociask	Sr
FB	44	Chris Pressley	So
C	53	Donovan Raiola (C)	Sr
FB	34	Bill Rentmeester	Fr
QB	7	John Stocco	Jr
WR	15	Luke Swan	So
OT	72	Joe Thomas	Jr
G	63	Kraig Urbik	Fr
WR	1	Brandon Williams	Sr

Defense

Pos.	#	Name	Class
LB	36	Travis Beckum	Fr
CB	6	Brett Bell (C)	Sr
LB	46	Jonathan Casillas	Fr
DT	96	Nick Hayden	So
CB	6	Jack Ikegwuonu	Fr
DE	90	Terrance Jamison	Fr
LB	7	DeAndre Levy	Fr
DL	54	Mike Newkirk	Fr
S	28	Aubrey Pleasant	Fr
CB	22	Roderick Rogers	Jr
CB	21	Levonne Rowan	Sr
LB	50	O'Brien Schofield	Fr
DL	92	Matt Shaughnessy	Fr
LB	41	Mark Zalewski (C)	Jr

Special teams

Pos.	#	Name	Class
P	94	Ken DeBauche	So
K	10	Taylor Mehlhaff	So

Head coach

- Barry Alvarez

Coordinators/assistant coaches

- Paul Chryst – Co-offensive coordinator/tight ends
- Brian White – Co-offensive coordinator/running backs
- Bret Bielema – Defensive coordinator/inside linebackers
- Jeff Horton – Quarterbacks
- Jim Hueber – Offensive line and run game coordinator
- Ron Lee – Defensive backs
- Henry Mason – Wide receivers
- Brian Murphy – Outside linebackers/special teams
- John Palermo – Assistant head coach/defensive line

Legend

- (C) Team captain
- (S) Suspended
- (I) Ineligible
- Injured
- Redshirt

Roster

=== Regular starters ===
Position	Player
Quarterback	John Stocco
Running back	Brian Calhoun
Fullback	Jason Pociask
Wide receiver	Jonathan Orr
Wide receiver	Brandon Williams
Tight end	Owen Daniels
Left tackle	Joe Thomas
Left guard	Matt Lawrence
Center	Donovan Raiola
Right guard	Jason Palermo
Right tackle	Kraig Urbik

Position	Player
Defensive end	Joe Monty
Defensive tackle	Jason Chapman
Defensive tackle	Nick Hayden
Defensive end	Matt Shaughnessy
Outside linebacker	LaMarr Watkins
Middle linebacker	Mark Zalewski
Outside linebacker	Dontez Sanders
Cornerback	Allen Langford
Strong safety	Joe Stellmacher
Free safety	Roderick Rogers
Cornerback	Brett Bell

== 2006 NFL draft ==
Player	Position	Round	Overall Selection	NFL team
Brian Calhoun	Running Back	3	74	Detroit Lions
Brandon Williams	Wide Receiver	3	84	San Francisco 49ers
Owen Daniels	Tight End	4	98	Houston Texans
Jason Pociask	Tight End	5	150	New York Jets
Jonathan Orr	Wide Receiver	6	172	Tennessee Titans
