= Jason Fletcher =

American sports agent

Jason Tobias Fletcher II
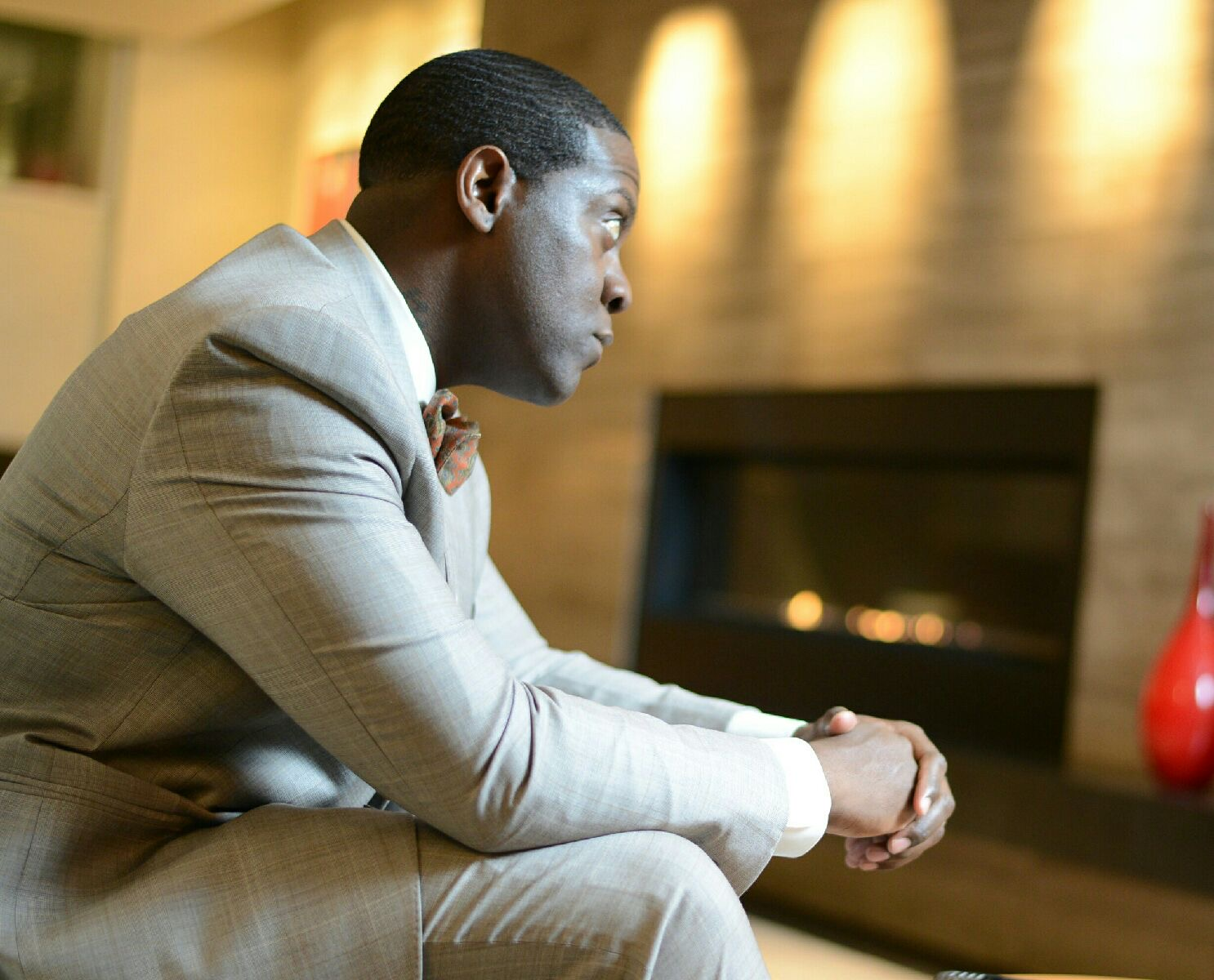
- Fletcher featured in ALIVE magazine in 2012
- Born: March 22, 1975 (age 51); St. Louis, Missouri, U.S.
- Education: University of Louisiana at Lafayette
- Occupation: Sports agent

Jason Fletcher (born March 22, 1975) is an American sports agent. A graduate of the University of Louisiana at Lafayette, he received his Bachelor of Science degree in Biological Science. Fletcher played football and also participated in track and field during his time at school. Former New York Giants General Manager Jerry Reese was a College Scout in 1997, Fletcher was clocked at 4.36 and 4.41(40) during a private workout at Bourgeois Hall. Fletcher was an NFL undrafted free agent from 1998 to 2000, having opportunities with several NFL teams and eventually playing in the arena football league with the Los Angeles Avengers under Stan Brock.

== B & F Sports ==
B & F Sports is the company founded by Jason Fletcher. Through B & F Sports, Jason Fletcher has been a certified National Football League contract advisor (NFL sports agent) since 2001. In 2003, Attorney Michael Walton was added to the staff as vice president and a licensed certified National Football League contract advisor. In 2005, B & F Sports became a direct affiliation and council of The Cochran Firm (St. Louis) to assist in the representation of their clients, with over 20 offices nationwide, serving NFL players from almost every team in the league. In early 2009, Jason Fletcher formed a merger with NFL agent Fletcher Smith (Chicago based agent), owner of Chicago Sports Management by Blueprint Sports Group representing over 20 plus NFL players, including Nate Irving, Mikel Leshoure, Weslye Saunders, and others.

Kelvin Hayden was released by the Chicago Bears on April 5, 2011. Smith was not able to secure an immediate new contract for Hayden, nearly five months after being released. Jason Fletcher made initial contact with the Atlanta Falcons' General Manager Thomas Dimitroff. Hayden ultimately received a fully guaranteed 1-year deal worth $785,000 on August 31, 2011.

Lofa Tatupu was released by the Seattle Seahawks on July 31, 2011, after not being able to come to an agreement on a restructured contract. Smith was not able to secure an immediate new contract for Tatupu, nearly 8 months after being released. Jason Fletcher again made initial contact with Atlanta Falcons General Manager Dimitroff. Tatupu received a 2-year deal worth $5.75 million with $3.6 million guaranteed on March 10, 2012.

== Highlights ==
Michael Young - Had a 3-year career with the Arizona Cardinals as a backup linebacker. Young was considered undersized and unproductive in college.

Christian Morton - Had opportunities with eight NFL organizations (Patriots - 2004, Browns - 2004, Saints - 2004, Falcons - 2004 & 2005, Redskins - 2005 & 2006, Panthers - 2006 & 2007, Broncos - 2008, Titans - 2009). Morton's career lasted longer than higher draft selections at the same position: Jeremy Lesueur (85th), Derrick Strait (76th), Will Poole (102nd), Michael Waddell (124th), Bruce Thornton (121st), Chris Thompson (150th), Jeff Shoate (152nd), Vontae Duff (170th), Greg Brooks (183rd), Dexter Wynn (192nd), Nathan Jones (205th), Alphonso Marshall (215th).

Antonio Cromartie - Selected by the San Diego Chargers with the 19th pick in the 2006 NFL draft: after one college start in his career, a major knee injury, and zero football played in 2005, Cromartie received a richer contract (5-year - $13.5 million with $7.5 million guaranteed) than 18th selection Bobby Carpenter (5-year - $10.8 million with $7.7 million guaranteed) and 15th selection Tye Hill (5-year - $12.6 million with $7.21 million guaranteed).

Brandon Williams - After completing his career at the University of Wisconsin as the all-time leader in receptions, Williams was still projected as a fifth-round selection. Williams received a richer contract (4 year - $2.285 million with a signing bonus of $675,000 = 571.250 average per year and an 8% increase over the 2005 84th selection) than 83rd selection Anthony Smith (3 year - $1.564 million with a signing bonus of $521,500), 79th selection Jerious Norwood (4 year - $1.8 million with a signing bonus of $720,000), and 77th selection Jon Alston (3 year - $1.374 million with a signing bonus of $550,000).

Leigh Bodden - The Patriots and Bodden were unable to reach an agreement on a contract extension prior to the start of free agency in March 2010. After visiting with the Houston Texans on March 8, 2010, Bodden was reported to have signed a deal with the Patriots the very next day. The following day, details of the contract were released: the total deal was $22 million over 4 years with $10 million guaranteed. The contract was front-loaded, with nearly two-thirds ($14 million) of the net value coming in the first two years. Bodden's free agency was handled by agents Alvin Keels and Jason Fletcher II.

Fletcher was listed on the Bleachers Report list of "The World's Most Powerful Sports Agents" 2010, 2011, 2012 and 2013

== NFL draft history ==
=== From 2001–2012 Fletcher's list of clients included NFL1st Round Draft selections, Pro Bowlers, and notable players ===
- Jamar Fletcher-CB- Miami Dolphins - 1st Round Selection - 26th Overall
- Michael Bennett -RB- Minnesota Vikings- 1st Round Selection 27th overall
- Jamie Winborn-LB- San Francisco 49ers - 2nd Round Selection - 47th Overall
- Michael Young-LB- Arizona Cardinals - Undrafted Free Agent
- Wendell Bryant-DT - Arizona Cardinals - 1st Round Selection - 12th Overall - His Second Agent
- Clinton Portis- RB- Denver Broncos- 2nd Round Selection- 51st Overall- His Second Agent
- Brandon Moore-OL - New York Jets - Undrafted Free Agent - His First Agent
- Charles Rogers-WR- Detroit Lions - 1st Round Selection - 2nd Overall - His Second Agent
- Christian Morton-CB - New England Patriots - 7th Round Selection - 233rd Overall
- Adam Jones-CB- Tennessee Titans - 1st Round Selection 6th Overall
- Fabian Washington-CB- Oakland Raiders - 1st Round Selection 23rd Overall
- Scott Starks-CB- Jacksonville Jaguars - 3rd Round Selection 87th Overall
- Damien Nash-RB- Tennessee Titans - 5th Round Selection (Deceased) - His First Agent
- C. C. Brown-S- Houston Texans - 6th Round Selection 188th Overall
- Antonio Cromartie-CB- San Diego Chargers - 1st Round Selection - 19th Overall - His First Agent
- Brian Calhoun-RB- Detroit Lions - 3rd Round Selection - 74th Overall
- Brandon Williams-WR- San Francisco 49ers - 3rd Round Selection - 84th Overall
- Jonathan Orr-WR- Tennessee Titans - 6th Round Selection - 172nd Overall
- Maurice Leggett-CB/FS- Kansas City Chiefs - Undrafted Free Agent
- Brian Schaefering-DL- Cleveland Browns - Undrafted Free Agent
- Herb Donaldson-RB- New Orleans Saints - Undrafted Free Agent
- Rennie Curran-LB- Tennessee Titans - 3rd Round Selection - 97th Overall
- Nate Irving -LB- Denver Broncos- 3rd Round Selection- 67th overall
- Weslye Saunders -TE- Pittsburgh Steelers- Undrafted Free Agent

From 2013–present Fletcher's list of clients includes NFL General Managers, Head Coaches, Coordinators, Position Coaches and College Coaches:

- Darrell Bevell - Jacksonville Jaguars Offensive Coordinator/ Detroit Lions Interim Head Coach
- Joey Boese - Cincinnati Bengals Head Strength & Conditions
- Marcus Coleman - Secondary
- Kevin Cosgrove- Texas Tech Linebackers
- Kevin Coyle- Miami Dolphins Defensive Coordinator/ Atlanta Legends Head Coach/ LSU Defensive Analyst
- Phillip Daniels - Philadelphia Eagles Defensive Line
- Bobby DePaul - Cleveland Browns Director of Scouting
- Eddie Faulkner - Pittsburgh Steelers Running Backs
- Chris Olsen - Atlanta Falcons Senior VP of Football Administration
- Don Shumpert - Assistant Running Backs
- DeAndre Smith - Texas Tech Running Backs
- Brian Stewart - University of Maryland Defensive Coordinator/ Dallas Cowboys Defensive Coordinator
- Deshea Townsend- Chicago Bears Secondary
- Sheldon White - Detroit Lions VP of Pro Personnel/Interim General Manager
- Gregg Williams- New York Jets Defensive Coordinator
- Rod Woodson- Oakland Raiders Secondary
- Bob Wylie - Cleveland Browns Offensive Line
- David Yost- University of Oregon Offensive Coordinator/ Utah State Offensive Coordinator/ Texas Tech Offensive Coordinator
