= John Stocco =

American football player (born 1983)

John Stocco (born June 14, 1983, in Richfield, Minnesota) is a former collegiate and professional American football quarterback. Stocco played football for the University of Wisconsin–Madison, starting at quarterback for the Badgers during his sophomore, junior and senior seasons. He was not drafted in the 2007 NFL draft.

He played professionally in Italy in the Italian Football League for the Rhinos Milano.

Stocco is now a teacher at Chicago Bulls College Prep located in Chicago, Illinois, which is a part of the Noble Network of Charter Schools.

In high school, Stocco was a teammate of Larry Fitzgerald, at the Academy of Holy Angels in Minneapolis, Minnesota. Out of high school, he was drafted in the 45th round by the Major League Baseball team the Minnesota Twins, but decided to go to college instead. "Had I been drafted higher, it might have been a tougher decision," he said in a 2003 ESPN online chat session. He was recruited by other Big Ten teams such as Michigan, Minnesota, Illinois, Iowa, Purdue, Penn State, Ohio State, Northwestern, and Michigan State. Stocco eventually settled on Wisconsin.

== College ==
Stocco began his career in 2003 as a backup to Jim Sorgi, with limited action in only three games with 17 attempts and 10 completions. Stocco was promoted to the starting position at the beginning of the 2004 NCAA Division I-A football season. Stocco was a steady leader, guiding the Badgers to a 9–0 start and as high as #4 in the national rankings. Stocco was limited as a passer, with the Badgers rushing game providing most of the offense behind running back Anthony Davis and a strong defense led by All-American defensive end Erasmus James. With hopes of a Rose Bowl invitation, the Badgers collapsed down the stretch, ending the season with two losses to fall out of BCS contention. The Badgers accepted a bid to the Outback Bowl, where they were defeated by Georgia, 24–21. Stocco completed 52.6% of his passes.

In 2005, Barry Alvarez's final season, the Badgers' offense was considerably more potent, with All-American candidates Brian Calhoun, Brandon Williams, and Joe Thomas leading the way. Stocco continued his steady play and saw an increase in his numbers, completing over 60% of his passes for nearly 3,000 yards and 21 touchdowns. The Badgers reached as high as #12 in the rankings after an 8–1 start, but consecutive losses to Penn State and Iowa ended their Big Ten title hopes. The Badgers finished the season 9-3 and accepted an invitation to the Capital One Bowl against Auburn. The Badgers were 11-point underdogs, but Stocco guided the Badgers to a commanding 24–10 victory to send Alvarez out a winner in his final game.

Stocco was the most experienced quarterback in the Big Ten entering his senior year in 2006, which was the rookie season for Bret Bielema. Stocco struggled with a new core of receivers, culminating in a loss to Michigan in Week 5. The Badgers got back on track and in sync as the season progressed, behind the legs of freshman sensation P. J. Hill, Jr., as the Badgers won their final eight games. During this time, Stocco's consecutive starts streak ended when he was injured in a home game against Penn state; however, the Badgers reached the top ten in the rankings and again accepted a bid to the Capital One Bowl, where they defeated Darren McFadden and the Arkansas Razorbacks. Stocco threw for 206 yards and two crucial touchdowns in the gritty 17–14 win, and was named the game's Most Valuable Player in his final collegiate game. The Badgers ended the season 12-1 and with a #7 ranking.

Stocco was 29-7 as a starter at Wisconsin. He completed 57.4% of his passes for 7,227 yards, 47 touchdowns and 22 interceptions.

== Professional football ==
Stocco declared for the 2007 NFL draft following the 2006 season but was not selected. He was invited for a three-day tryout with the Green Bay Packers but did not get a contract; he was subsequently invited to try out with the New York Giants but did not make the roster.

In September 2007, Stocco was invited for a spot on the roster of the Michigan team that would have participated in the proposed All American Football League the league folded before playing a game.

In December 2007, Stocco signed with an Italian team, Rhinos Milano, playing in the Italian Football League, the top league in Italy. In the team's last regular season game in June 2008, Stocco suffered a separated shoulder injury. The Rhinos finished the season with a 4-6 record.

In February 2016, Stocco was hired by the University of Wisconsin, as Director of Development in the athletics department.
