= 2006 Capital One Bowl =

American college football game

Wisconsin Badgers	Auburn Tigers
(9–3)	(9–2)
Big Ten	SEC
24	10
Head coach: Barry Alvarez	Head coach: Tommy Tuberville
AP / Coaches / BCS; 21 / 20 / 18	AP / Coaches / BCS; 7 / 7 / 9
	1	2	3	4	Total
Wisconsin	10	7	0	7	24
Auburn	0	0	3	7	10
- Date: January 2, 2006
- Season: 2005
- Stadium: Florida Citrus Bowl
- Location: Orlando, Florida
- MVP: RB Brian Calhoun, Wisconsin
- Favorite: Auburn by 10.5
- Referee: Ron Cherry (ACC)
- Attendance: 57,221
- Payout: US$4.25 million

United States TV coverage
- Network: ABC
- Announcers: Ron Franklin, Bob Davie, and Holly Rowe

The 2006 Capital One Bowl was a post-season college football bowl game between the Wisconsin Badgers and the Auburn Tigers on January 2, 2006, at the Citrus Bowl in Orlando, Florida. Despite the odds against them, Wisconsin defeated the higher ranked Tigers, 24-10.

Prior to the bowl game, Barry Alvarez announced that he would be stepping down as head coach of Wisconsin after 16 seasons and eight bowl victories in order to focus his attention on his duties as the athletic director at the university.

Brian Calhoun, the MVP of the game, rushed 30 times for 213 yards and a 33-yard touchdown in the fourth quarter to seal the game for the Badgers. This would turn out to be his last collegiate football game as Calhoun opted to forgo his senior year in favor of entering the NFL draft. Badgers QB John Stocco threw for 301 yards and two touchdowns. Wisconsin wide receiver Brandon Williams caught six passes for 173 yards and a touchdown in addition to 35 yards rushing.

Despite having the top offense in the Southeastern Conference, Auburn was not able to establish themselves against the Badgers defense. In the 2005 season, Auburn had not been shut out in the first half. Overall, Auburn's offense was outgained by Wisconsin by over two to one.

== Statistics ==
Statistics	Wisconsin	Auburn
1st downs	24	19
Total yards	548	236
Passing yards	301	137
Rushing yards	247	99
Penalties	7-56	5-35
3rd down conversions	7–15	4-14
4th down conversions	0-0	2-2
Turnovers	1	2
Time of possession	30:48	29:12

=== Scoring summary ===
Scoring Play	Score
1st Quarter
WIS – Brandon Williams 30 Yd Pass from John Stocco (Taylor Mehlhaff kick), 7:55	WIS 7-0
WIS – Taylor Mehlhaff 19 Yd FG, 0:21	WIS 10-0
2nd Quarter
WIS – Owen Daniels 13 Yd Pass From John Stocco (Taylor Mehlhaff kick), 7:19	WIS 17-0
3rd Quarter
AUB – John Vaughn 19 Yd FG, 11:54	WIS 17-3
4th Quarter
AUB – Courtney Taylor 9 Yd Pass From Brandon Cox (John Vaughn kick), 14:49	WIS 17-10
WIS – Brian Calhoun 33 Yd Run (Taylor Mehlhaff kick), 13:22	WIS 24-10
