= Joe Thomas (offensive tackle) =

American football player (born 1984)

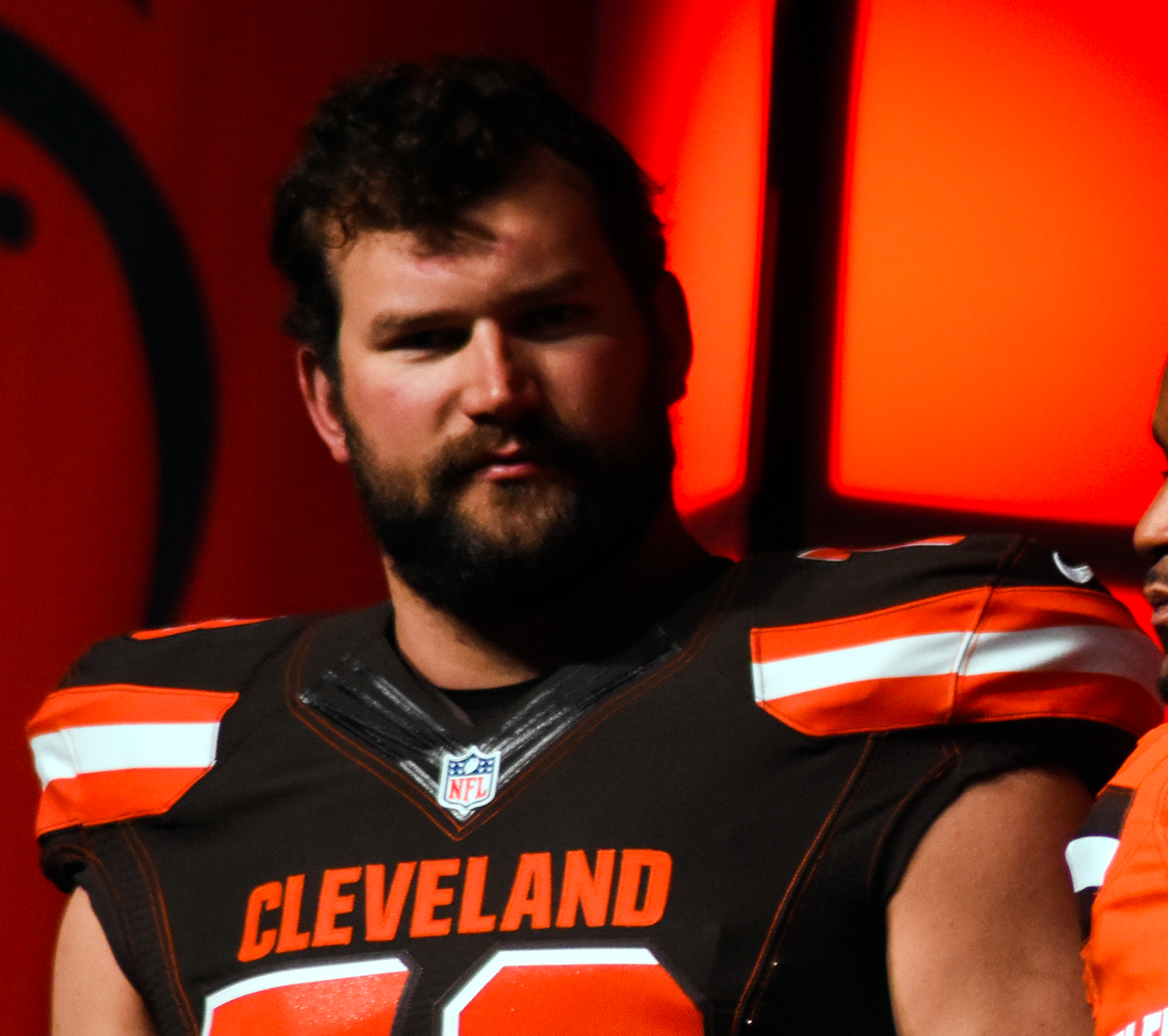
- Thomas with the Cleveland Browns in 2015

No. 73
- Position: Offensive tackle

Personal information
- Born: December 4, 1984 (age 41); Brookfield, Wisconsin, U.S.
- Listed height: 6 ft 6 in (1.98 m)
- Listed weight: 312 lb (142 kg)

Career information
- High school: Brookfield Central
- College: Wisconsin (2003–2006)
- NFL draft: 2007: 1st round, 3rd overall pick

Career history

Playing
- Cleveland Browns (2007–2017)

Coaching
- Munich Ravens (2024) Offensive line coach

Awards and highlights
- 6× First-team All-Pro (2009–2011, 2013–2015); 2× Second-team All-Pro (2008, 2012); 10× Pro Bowl (2007–2016); NFL 2010s All-Decade Team; PFWA All-Rookie Team (2007); Cleveland Browns Ring of Honor; Cleveland Browns Legends; Outland Trophy (2006); Jim Parker Trophy (2006); Unanimous All-American (2006); Second-team All-American (2005); 2× First-team All-Big Ten (2005, 2006); NFL record: Most consecutive snaps played: 10,363

Career NFL statistics
- Games played: 167
- Games started: 167
- Fumble recoveries: 10
- Stats at Pro Football Reference
- Pro Football Hall of Fame
- College Football Hall of Fame

Joseph Hayden Thomas (born December 4, 1984) is an American former professional football player who was an offensive tackle for 11 seasons with the Cleveland Browns in the National Football League (NFL). He played college football at Wisconsin, earned unanimous All-American honors, and was recognized as the top college interior lineman.

The Browns selected Thomas with the third overall pick in the 2007 NFL draft. He was invited to the Pro Bowl in each of his first 10 seasons and did not miss a single play in his career until the 2017 season (his final season in the NFL); his 10,363 consecutive snaps played is the longest streak since the NFL began recording snap counts in 1999. He is regarded as one of the greatest offensive linemen of all time. In 2023, Thomas was elected to the Pro Football Hall of Fame in his first year of eligibility, becoming the first Cleveland Brown inductee since their reactivation in 1999.

== Early life ==
Thomas was born in Brookfield, Wisconsin. His parents are Eric and Sally Thomas. He attended Brookfield Central High School, and played right tackle, defensive end, tight end, fullback, placekicker, and punter for the Brookfield Central Lancers high school football team. He was listed among the top 20 offensive tackles nationally, PrepStar All-American, second-team All-America offensive guard according to USA Today, member of the Detroit Free Press All-Midwest team, Milwaukee Journal Sentinel first-team all-state defensive lineman and second-team all-state offensive guard as a junior, and also received first-team all-state honors at defensive end from the Wisconsin Football Coaches Association (WFCA) and Associated Press. He was recognized as the WFCA 2002 Defensive Player of the Year. He had 85 tackles and 12 sacks as a senior. As a junior, he had 70 tackles and eight sacks. He was listed as the third best prospect in the state of Wisconsin in 2003. Aside from his athletic prowess, Thomas performed well academically. He was a four-year honor roll student and a part of the U.S. Army Academic All-America team and played in the 2003 U.S. Army All-American Bowl.

Regarded as a four-star recruit by Rivals.com, Thomas was ranked as the No. 18 offensive tackle prospect in the class of 2003. Wisconsin, Nebraska, Colorado, and Notre Dame vied for his recruitment before he signed his letter of intent to Wisconsin in January 2003.

In track and field, Thomas set the school record for shot put and discus with throws of 64 ft 10 in (19.76 m) and 185 ft 7 in (56.57 m). He lettered four times in track and field. He also holds the school indoor record in the shot put (62 ft 1 1/4 in or 18.93 m).

== College career ==
Thomas enrolled in the University of Wisconsin, where he played for the Wisconsin Badgers football team from 2003 to 2006. As a true freshman, he mostly saw action as a blocking tight end in the 2003 season. In 2004, he started all 12 games at left tackle, helping the Badgers' ground game with Anthony Davis and Matt Bernstein in the backfield.

In 2005, Barry Alvarez's final season as the Badgers' head coach, he started all 13 games at left tackle and was named a first-team All-American by Pro Football Weekly. He blocked for Brian Calhoun, who had an impressive year, racking up 1,500 rushing yards and 500 receiving yards. Thomas considered declaring for the 2006 NFL draft, where he was projected among the top 15 picks (and projected as the second offensive lineman behind Virginia prospect D'Brickashaw Ferguson). The Badgers were invited to the Capital One Bowl against Auburn, where they prevailed 24–10. Unfortunately, Thomas tore his ACL playing defensive end because of injuries to other players at the position. The Badgers finished that season 10–3 with a #15 national ranking. Soon after the game, Thomas announced that he would be returning to Wisconsin for his final year.

His senior season in 2006 began with high expectations. As the offensive captain, he started all 13 games and blocked for P. J. Hill, Jr., who recorded over 1,500 rushing yards. Following the regular season, Thomas won the Outland Trophy as the nation's top interior lineman, and he was recognized as a unanimous first-team All-American. Thomas and the Badgers were again invited to the Capital One Bowl, this time against Arkansas. The Badgers prevailed over the Razorbacks by a score of 17–14 and finished the season 12–1.

He also excelled at shot put for the Badgers' track and field team. He garnered national recognition for record-breaking performances in shot put and discus throw. He was a 2005 second-team All-Big Ten Conference selection, as he qualified for the 2004 and 2005 NCAA Regionals in the shot put and discus throw. He majored in business administration while at the University of Wisconsin. This is where he met his future wife, Annie Nelson of Hudson, Wisconsin.

== Professional career ==
Pre-draft measurables
Height	Weight	Arm length	Hand span	40-yard dash	10-yard split	20-yard split	20-yard shuttle	Three-cone drill	Vertical jump	Broad jump	Bench press
6 ft 6 5/8 in (2.00 m)	311 lb (141 kg)	33 3/4 in (0.86 m)	10 1/8 in (0.26 m)	5.00 s	1.79 s	2.93 s	4.88 s	7.95 s	33 in (0.84 m)	9 ft 2 in (2.79 m)	28 reps
All values from NFL Combine

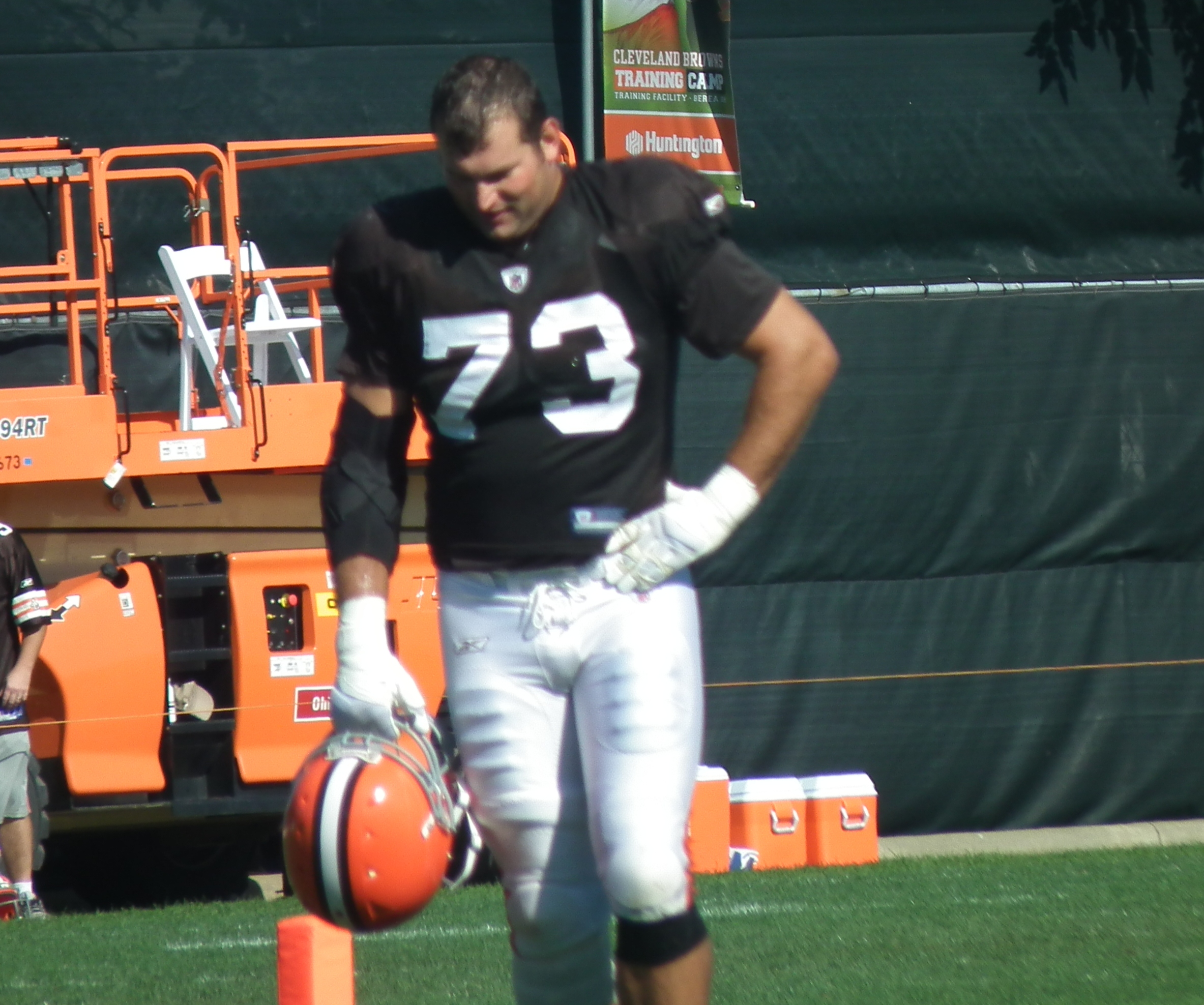
Thomas at Browns' training camp in 2011

=== 2007 ===
The Cleveland Browns drafted Thomas in the first round of the 2007 NFL draft with the third overall selection. Thomas spent the draft fishing on Lake Michigan with his father, father-in-law, and Joe Panos, who was also a standout offensive lineman at Wisconsin and is a former Brookfield resident. Thomas discovered he was drafted by the Browns via cell phone.

Thomas signed a six-year contract worth $43 million, $23 million guaranteed, including a voidable year, with the Browns. Thomas won the starting left tackle job, with previous Browns left tackle Kevin Shaffer moving to right tackle. He made his NFL debut versus the Pittsburgh Steelers in week 1 and played every offensive snap for the Browns in 2007. Thomas quickly became one of the top-performing members of the 2007 draft class and was named the NFL's Rookie of the Month for November. Thomas was selected to the 2008 Pro Bowl, replacing Jason Peters of the Buffalo Bills. He was named to the NFL All-Rookie Team.

Thomas came in second in the voting for NFL Rookie of the Year. He was the only player to receive votes besides the eventual winner, Adrian Peterson.

=== 2008 ===
For the second consecutive season, Thomas started each game for the Browns. Thomas was selected to his second Pro Bowl. During the 2008 campaign, the Browns offensive line only allowed 19 sacks, which was tied for the third fewest in franchise history. Thomas played in every snap during the season, though the Browns finished the season with a 4–12 record.

=== 2009 ===
Thomas continued his role as a reliable presence for the Browns' offensive line in the 2009 season. He started all 16 games in another Pro Bowl season. For the first time as a professional, Thomas was named as a First-team All-Pro. The Browns finished with a 5–11 record.

=== 2010 ===
For the fourth consecutive season, Thomas started all 16 games for the Browns. However, the Browns once again finished with a 5–11 record. Thomas earned Pro Bowl and First-team All-Pro honors once again. He was ranked 43rd by his fellow players on the NFL Top 100 Players of 2011.

=== 2011 ===
On August 22, 2011, Thomas and the Browns agreed to a record setting seven-year, $84 million extension with $44 million guaranteed. The deal was negotiated by his agent Peter Schaffer and Matt Thomas and Tom Heckert of the Browns.

On December 27, 2011, Thomas was named to his fifth straight Pro Bowl since the Browns drafted him. Since 1970, Thomas and Richmond Webb of the Miami Dolphins are the only NFL offensive linemen to make the Pro Bowl in each of their first five seasons. Thomas and Pro Football Hall of Fame running back Jim Brown are the only Browns players ever to be selected to the Pro Bowl for the first five seasons of their careers. Hall of Fame running back Leroy Kelly was the last Browns player to earn five or more consecutive invitations to the Pro Bowl. For the third consecutive season, he was named as a First-team All-Pro. He was ranked 82nd by his peers on the NFL Top 100 Players of 2012.

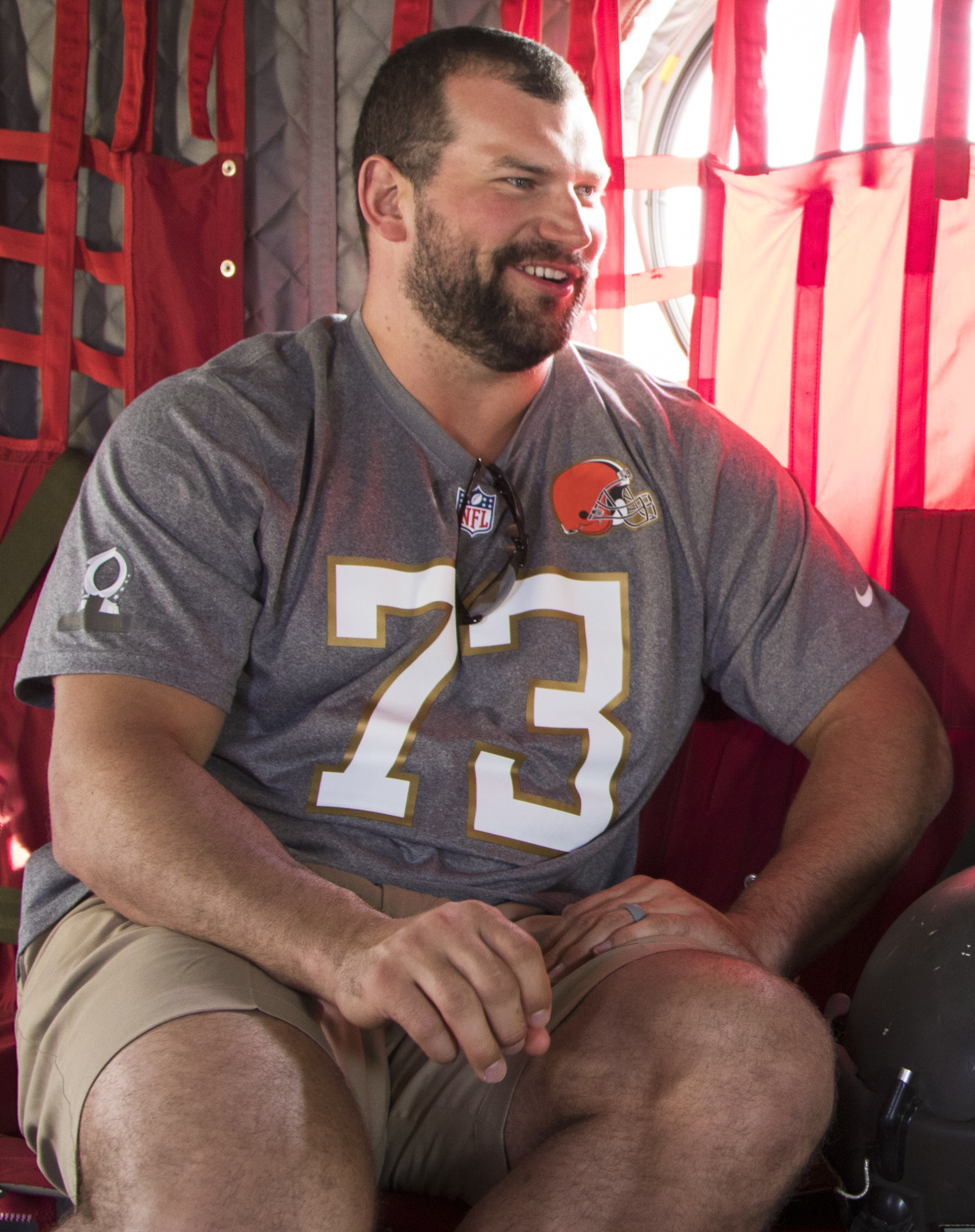
Thomas at the 2016 Pro Bowl

=== 2012 ===
Thomas started all 16 games for the Browns for the sixth consecutive season. However, the Browns continued to struggle with a 5–11 record. On December 26, 2012, Thomas was named to his sixth straight Pro Bowl. Thomas joined a short list of only 15 players who have made the Pro Bowl in each of their first six seasons in NFL history. He was selected for the All Pro 2nd Team by the Associated Press. He was ranked 28th by his fellow players on the NFL Top 100 Players of 2013.

=== 2013 ===
Thomas continued to showcase his reliability and durability by starting all 16 games for the Browns once again. On December 27, 2013, Thomas was voted to his seventh straight Pro Bowl selection. Thomas joins Hall of Famer Jim Brown as the only two Browns to make the Pro Bowl in their first seven seasons. Thomas on making his seventh straight Pro Bowl became one of only 11 players in NFL history to make it their first seven seasons. The list of other players who have done it and gone on to make the Hall of Fame includes Dick Butkus, Joe Greene, Franco Harris, Merlin Olsen, Mel Renfro, Barry Sanders, Lawrence Taylor and Derrick Thomas. He earned First-team All-Pro honors for the fourth time in his career. He was ranked 18th by his fellow players on the NFL Top 100 Players of 2014.

=== 2014 ===
In the 2014 season, Thomas started all 16 games of the Browns' 7–9 campaign. On December 23, 2014, Thomas made NFL history, becoming the only offensive lineman to be named to the Pro Bowl in each of his first eight seasons. He earned First-team All-Pro honors for the fifth time. He was ranked 25th by his fellow players on the NFL Top 100 Players of 2015.

=== 2015 ===
In the days leading up to the November 3, 2015 NFL trade deadline, the Browns and Denver Broncos held advanced talks on a deal that would have sent Thomas to Denver. Reports at the time said the Broncos offered a first-round pick, but Cleveland sought a larger return, and the sides failed to reach agreement before the deadline. Thomas later said that Broncos quarterback Peyton Manning personally called him during that period and urged him to push for a trade to Denver.

Thomas was once again one of the few bright spots in a dismal 3–13 season for the Browns. He started all 16 games and earned his ninth Pro Bowl nomination and sixth First-team All-Pro nomination. At the end of the 2015 season, Thomas was named the recipient of Pro Football Focus's Bruce Matthews Award for best offensive lineman in the league. He was ranked 23rd by his fellow players on the NFL Top 100 Players of 2016.

=== 2016 ===
For the tenth straight season, Thomas started in all 16 games. He kept his Pro Bowl streak alive in 2016 being named to his 10th straight Pro Bowl, despite the Browns finishing with a league worst 1–15 record. He was ranked 25th by his peers on the NFL Top 100 Players of 2017.

=== 2017 ===
In 2017, Thomas revealed that he had been experiencing early stage memory loss, but that he would not allow it to affect his career.

On September 17, 2017, Thomas played his 10,000th consecutive NFL snap, having never missed a play. He is the first player to reach the milestone in NFL history. Thomas' iron man consecutive snap streak ended at 10,363 in Week 7 on October 22, 2017, when he injured his triceps while blocking the Tennessee Titans' Brian Orakpo. The next day, it was revealed that he suffered a torn triceps in his left arm, which prematurely ended his 2017 season as he was placed on injured reserve. On November 4, the Browns gave Thomas a raise in pay.

On March 14, 2018, Thomas announced his retirement from the NFL.

== Legacy ==
In 2019, Thomas was named to the College Football Hall of Fame.

Despite retiring with a career record of 48 wins, 128 losses, and no playoff appearances, Thomas provided a bright spot on the often struggling Cleveland Browns, playing 10,363 consecutive snaps (the longest streak since snap counts were first recorded in 1999), being voted to ten Pro Bowls, six first-team All-Pro selections, and two second-team All-Pro selections during his 11 seasons. He has widely been regarded as one of the greatest offensive linemen in NFL history, particularly noted as one of the best left tackles. In April 2020, Thomas was named to the NFL 2010s All-Decade team. Noted for his durability, quickness, and athleticism at left tackle, many attribute his legendary pass blocking skills to his unorthodox style, utilizing a "shot put" method to kick off the line. Of 6,680 pass blocking attempts, Thomas allowed only 30 sacks during his career. He was also known for rarely committing holding penalties. He was chosen on NFL.com as the 7th greatest offensive tackle of all time, as well as the third greatest Cleveland Brown of all time. He became eligible for the Hall of Fame in 2023 and was inducted that year.

== Post-retirement ==
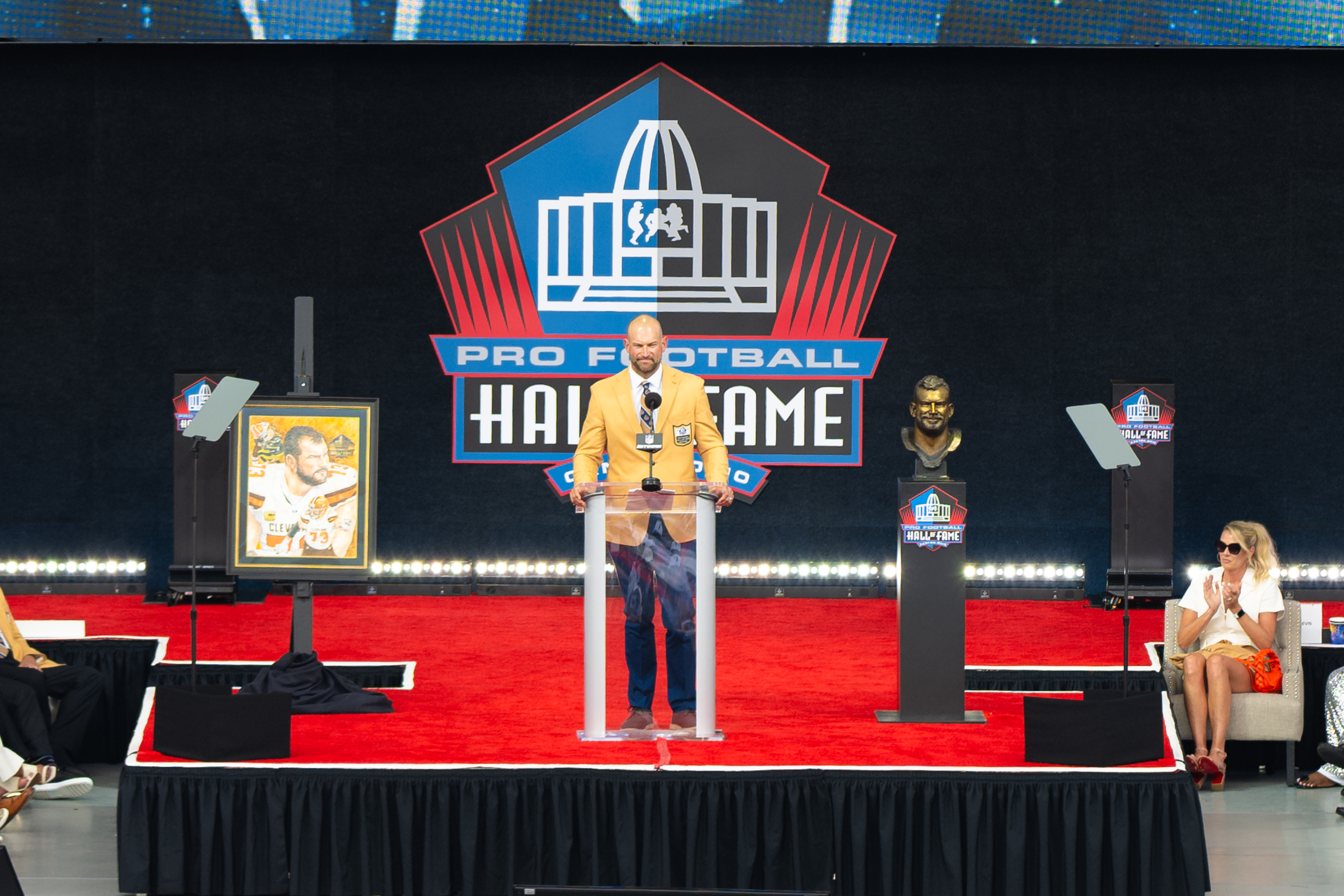
Thomas being inducted to Pro Football Hall of Fame in 2023

After retiring, Thomas lost 50 pounds.

Thomas is an analyst for the NFL Network, appearing on pre-game and post-game Thursday Night Football shows. He co-hosted a podcast, the ThomaHawk Show, with fellow former NFL and Cleveland Browns player Andrew Hawkins. He also continues to do media work with the Browns organization, including game analysis and breakdowns with the “Cup of Joe” segments beginning with the 2020 season.

Thomas competed in Season Two of The Titan Games as a Central Division Titan. He was a three-time undefeated Titan in the Central Division, but missed out on being the Central Champion. He was a guest on a 2021 episode of In Depth with Graham Bensinger.

Thomas is a partner in several Mission BBQ franchises.

Thomas also works as an analyst for select NFL games on Westwood One.

In 2024, he served as the offensive line coach for the Munich Ravens of the European League of Football. In his lone season, the Ravens qualified for the playoffs for the first time in team history.
