= Jonathan Orr =

American football player (born 1983)

No. 14
- Position: Wide receiver

Personal information
- Born: March 20, 1983 (age 43); Detroit, Michigan, U.S.
- Listed height: 6 ft 2 in (1.88 m)
- Listed weight: 198 lb (90 kg)

Career information
- College: Wisconsin
- NFL draft: 2006: 6th round, 172nd overall pick

Career history
- Tennessee Titans (2006); Oakland Raiders (2007)*
- * Offseason or practice squad member only

Jonathan Orr (born March 20, 1983) is an American former professional football wide receiver who played for the National Football League (NFL)'s Oakland Raiders and Tennessee Titans. He was selected by the Titans in the sixth round of the 2006 NFL draft. He played college football at the University of Wisconsin–Madison.

== Early life ==
Orr attended Henry Ford High School in Detroit, Michigan, and in addition to being a letterman in football and track, he served as class president his senior year.

== College career ==
=== College statistics ===
Year	Team	G	Rec	Yards	AVG	TD
2002	Wisconsin	14	47	842	17.9	8
2003	Wisconsin	13	7	117	16.7	0
2004	Wisconsin	13	13	177	13.6	3
2005	Wisconsin	13	40	688	17.2	8
Total		53	107	1824	17.0	19

==== 2002 season ====
With Wisconsin missing top receiver Lee Evans due to a torn ACL suffered in the Spring Game, Orr stepped up in a big way for the Badgers, catching 47 passes for 842 yards and 8 touchdowns. He played in all 14 games for Wisconsin.

==== 2003 season ====
Orr suffered through a significant sophomore slump, catching just 7 passes yet appearing in all 13 games for the Badgers.

==== 2004 season ====
Orr caught 13 passes for 177 yards and 3 touchdowns. He would play in all 13 games.

==== 2005 season ====
In his senior season, Orr would catch 40 passes for 688 yards with eight touchdown receptions. He ranked first on the team in touchdown receptions.

In the season opener, against Bowling Green, Orr made 3 receptions for 38 yards with a touchdown. He would not record a single reception in the next game against Temple, but rebounded to record 4 receptions for 33 yards against North Carolina in Kenan Memorial Stadium. As Big Ten conference play began, Orr was held to just one catch in Wisconsin's win over Michigan, their first since 1994. Against Indiana the next week, Jonathan Orr caught 4 passes for 128 yards with a touchdown. His efforts against Indiana, however, would be trumped by his game against Northwestern in Evanston, where he caught 5 receptions for 87 yards, with 4 touchdown receptions. However, his amazing game was not enough to keep the Badgers undefeated, as they fell to the Wildcats in a wild 48–51 loss.

Against Minnesota, Orr caught 3 passes for 64 yards. In a game against Purdue in Camp Randall Stadium the next week, Orr hauled in 4 passes for 53 yards, and against Illinois the week after, he caught 5 passes for 41 yards. In a game against eventual Big Ten champion Penn State, Orr found room for 89 yards on just 3 receptions against one of the top defenses in the nation. In his final home game, the Badgers were upset by the Iowa Hawkeyes; Orr caught just one pass for 9 yards. Against Hawaii in his final regular season game with the Badgers, Orr caught 3 passes for 60 yards, with 2 touchdown receptions as the Badgers won their 9th game of the year, 41–24. In the 2006 Capital One Bowl against Auburn, Orr would catch 4 passes for 74 yards in a 24-10 Wisconsin win.

Orr was selected in the sixth round of the 2006 NFL draft with the 172nd overall pick by the Tennessee Titans.

== Professional career ==
Pre-draft measurables
Height	Weight	Arm length	Hand span	40-yard dash	10-yard split	20-yard split	20-yard shuttle	Three-cone drill	Vertical jump	Broad jump
6 ft 2 1/8 in (1.88 m)	198 lb (90 kg)	34 in (0.86 m)	9 5/8 in (0.24 m)	4.41 s	1.56 s	2.62 s	4.16 s	7.31 s	35.5 in (0.90 m)	9 ft 11 in (3.02 m)
All values from NFL Combine

Orr did not play in any games for the Tennessee Titans his rookie season and was released from the team on August 26, 2007. On September 4, 2007, he was signed to the Oakland Raiders practice squad. On September 21 he was released by the Raiders.
