= Jamar Fletcher =

American football player (born 1979)

No. 24, 21, 25
- Position: Cornerback

Personal information
- Born: August 28, 1979 (age 47); St. Louis, Missouri, U.S.
- Listed height: 5 ft 9 in (1.75 m)
- Listed weight: 187 lb (85 kg)

Career information
- High school: Hazelwood East (St. Louis)
- College: Wisconsin (1998–2000)
- NFL draft: 2001: 1st round, 26th overall pick

Career history
- Miami Dolphins (2001–2003); San Diego Chargers (2004–2005); Detroit Lions (2006); Houston Texans (2007); Cincinnati Bengals (2008)

Awards and highlights
- Consensus All-American (2000); First-team All-American (1999); Jim Thorpe Award (2000); Jack Tatum Trophy (2000); Big Ten Defensive Player of the Year (2000); 3× First-team All-Big Ten (1998, 1999, 2000)

Career NFL statistics
- Total tackles: 193
- Forced fumbles: 1
- Fumble recoveries: 3
- Pass deflections: 34
- Interceptions: 7
- Defensive touchdowns: 1
- Stats at Pro Football Reference

Jamar Mondell Israel (born Jamar Mondell Fletcher; August 28, 1979) is an American former professional football player who was a cornerback in the National Football League (NFL) for eight seasons. He played college football for the Wisconsin Badgers and was a two-time All-American selection. He was selected by the Miami Dolphins in the first round of the 2001 NFL draft, and he also played for the San Diego Chargers, Detroit Lions, Houston Texans and Cincinnati Bengals.

== Early life ==
Fletcher was born in St. Louis, Missouri. He played high school football for Hazelwood East High School in St. Louis. Jamar was a key part of the team's success with starting rotation at split end / flanker, but also saw duties at quarterback, cornerback, and both kickoff and punt return as a specialist. Fletcher had (11) touchdowns and over (750) yards of total offense during his junior season. Hazelwood East Spartans went 14-0 winning the 1995 Missouri 5A State Championship, and finished ranked in the USA Today's Super 25 top high-school football teams in the nation. The team featured (4) future NFL players: Jamar Fletcher, Bryan Fletcher, Reggie Germany and Mike Young.

During the 1996 season, Fletcher was moved to starting quarterback, cornerback, and return specialist. He passed for 1,600+ yards with (19) touchdowns, rushed for 1,200+ yards with (26) touchdowns, (2) punt returns for touchdowns, (2) kickoff returns for touchdowns, and secured a team and Suburban North Conference leading (7) interceptions during his senior season. Fletcher was a 2-year letterman on varsity for the Spartans during the 1995 and 1996 seasons, which resulted in 22 - 2 record. Fletcher was a 3-star prospect recruited by: Indiana, Iowa, University Louisiana-Lafayette, Kansas, Kansas State, Miami-Ohio, Missouri, Minnesota, and Wisconsin.

== College career ==
Fletcher attended the University of Wisconsin–Madison, where he played for the Badgers from 1998 to 2000. He was a key member of their back-to-back Rose Bowl championship teams. Fletcher holds the school's career-records with 21 interceptions for 459 yards in returns, topping the previous marks of 18 thefts, first set by Neovia Greyer (1969–71) and matched by Jeff Messenger (1991–94) and Greyer's 285 yards. His 459 yards in returns topped the old Big Ten Conference all-time record of 431, set by Tom Curtis of Michigan (1967–69). Fletcher set another Badgers career-record with 57 pass deflections, surpassing the old mark of 41 by Troy Vincent (1988–91). He was the only player in Big Ten history to lead the conference in interceptions three-straight years. His five interception returns for touchdowns established new Wisconsin and Big Ten all-time records. He finished his career with 130 tackles (106 solos). He was named a first-team All-American by multiple selector organizations in 1999, and was recognized as a consensus first-team All-American in 2000. He was also named to the Top 100 Greatest College Players list by America's Best & 10.

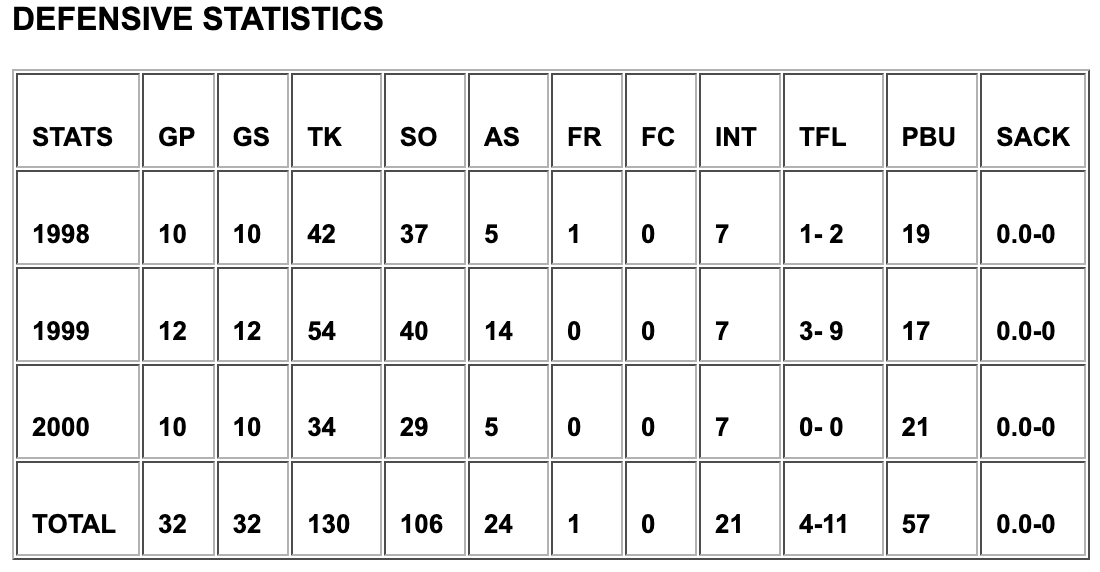
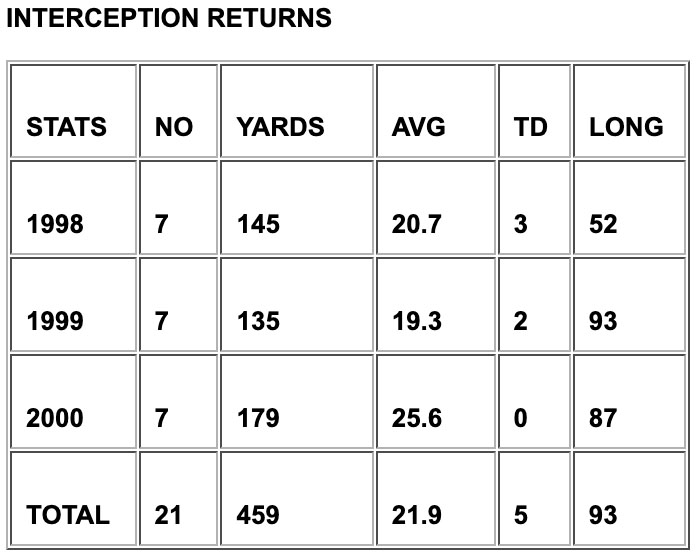

2000 SEASON

Earned All-American first-team honors from every sports service and newspaper in the country, except for The Sporting News, which bestowed upon him second-team accolades...Winner of the Jim Thorpe Award, given to the top defensive back in the nation...Unanimous All-Big Ten Conference first-team choice and Defensive Player of the Year...Named Touchdown Club of Columbus Defensive Back of the Year...Started ten games at left cornerback, ranking fourth in the Big Ten with 21 pass deflections (only teammate Mike Echols’ 25 pass break-ups in 2000 top his 21 on the school's season-record list)...Had seven interceptions for a Badger season-record 179 yards in returns, topping the previous mark of 156 yards by David Greenwood in 1981...Only Neovia Greyer (nine in 1970) had more interceptions in a season for Wisconsin...Recorded 34 tackles (29 solos)...Did not allow a reception in four games as opponents averaged only 1.2 catches per game in his territory during the course of the season.

Western Michigan, Cincinnati and Northwestern...One of 24 Wisconsin athletes that were ordered by the NCAA to miss game action...The NCAA ruled that these athletes had received an "improper" discount from a local sporting goods store, a violation of NCAA rules.

Oregon...Made the Ducks regret that he was eligible for this contest, as he picked off three of QB Joey Harrington's passes for a total of 58 yards in returns, deflected 5 other passes and made 3 solo tackles...Also saw action as a receiver, but did not catch any passes.

Michigan...In his much-hyped meeting against David Terrell, he deflected a pass out of the Wolverine's hands in the corner of the end zone and held the receiver to only a 22-yard catch.

Ohio State...Held All-Big Ten receiver Reggie Germany to a 3-yard reception (Germany had a 23-yarder on the opposite side of the field) as he made a pair of pass break-ups and 3 solo tackles.

Purdue...QB Drew Brees only threw three passes to Jamar's territory, all resulting in incompletions.

Iowa...Stepped in front of receiver Kevin Kasper on a slant pattern to intercept the pass and also deflected 5 others as Kasper, who was averaging eight catches per game, was held to three grabs for a total of 10 yards.

Minnesota...Made a key block on 290-pound center Ben Hamilton on Badger cornerback Mike Echols’ 56-yard interception return for a touchdown.

Indiana...Registered a season-high 7 tackles (6 solos), deflected 3 passes and intercepted another, returning the ball 87 yards...Only Jim Nettles (89 vs. New Mexico State in 1962), Ron Steiner (94 vs. West Virginia in 1957), Billy Lowe (98 vs. Purdue in 1954) and himself (93 vs. Northwestern in 1999) had longer interception returns in school history.

Hawaii...Had 3 pass deflections in the season finale.

UCLA (Sun Bowl)...Returned an interception 20 yards, made 7 tackles (6 solos) and batted away a pair of passes in his collegiate finale...Was supposed to play on offense as a receiver, but he suffered a shoulder bruise early in the bowl game and the coaching staff felt it was best to just have him perform on defense.

1999 SEASON

First-team All-American selection by The Sporting News, Football News and College Football News, adding second-team honors from Walter Camp and CBS Sportsline...Only sophomore to earn consensus All-Big Ten Conference first-team recognition...Led the Big Ten in interceptions for second season in a row and tied for sixth nationally (0.64 per game)...In a poll conducted by The Sporting News (nearly 75,000 fans), Jamar finished second in voting for National Defensive Player of the Year honors (award went to Virginia Tech's Corey Moore)...Finalist for ABC-TV's "Obscurity Award," which goes to a star player that has not received his due...His 135 yards on interception returns were fifth-best nationally and his two returns for touchdowns were tied for first in the league...Only Badger to earn team Defensive Player of the Week honors four times (Cincinnati, Minnesota, Michigan State and Purdue)...Named Big Ten Defensive Player of the Week vs. Purdue and Special Teams Player of the Week vs. Northwestern...Recorded a career-high 54 tackles (40 solos) with three stops for losses of 139 yards...Had seven interceptions and 17 pass deflections.

Ball State...Made 4 hits with a stop behind the line of scrimmage and a pass deflection.

Cincinnati...Picked off a pass in the end zone, deflected another and had 4 tackles (3 solos).

Michigan...Collected 5 tackles (4 solos) and batted away a pass.

Minnesota...Stepped in front of a slant pattern meant for Ron Johnson to intercept the ball and was in on 4 tackles, including one for a 5-yard loss as Johnson experienced the first game of his career with no catches.

Michigan State...Came out the winner in a fierce battle with 6:05 receiver Plaxico Burress, stealing two passes away from the Spartan split end for interceptions while deflecting another pass inside the end zone.

Northwestern...Registered a career-high 9 tackles (6 solos) as he stopped tailback Damien Anderson for a 2-yard loss, deflected 3 passes and picked off another for a 93-yard touchdown return...His 93-yarder was the third-longest interception return in school history.

Purdue...As hard as he tried to throw away from Jamar's territory, QB Drew Brees fell victim to a pair of interceptions, including one that was returned 52 yards for a game-winning touchdown late in the fourth quarter of a 31–24 decision and also had 6 tackles (5 solos) with a pass break-up...Brees set an NCAA record by attempting 83 passes in that game.

Stanford (Rose Bowl)...Credited with a 7-tackle (6 solos) performance.

1998 SEASON

Freshman All-American selection by The Sporting News and Football News...First-team All-Big Ten Conference choice by the media and second-team by the league's coaches...First Badger freshman since Ron Dayne (1996) to earn first-team all-league honors...Named the team's Defensive Rookie of the Year...Helped Wisconsin's pass defense improve from 10th in the Big Ten in 1997 (he redshirted) to seventh in the NCAA in 1998...Led the nation in interceptions (.67 per game), becoming the first Badger since Ira Matthews in 1976 to lead the NCAA in a category (Matthews paced the nation in punt returns)...Returned three of his seven interceptions for touchdowns to set a Big Ten season-record...Recorded 42 tackles (37 solos) with a stop for a 2-yard loss from his strongside cornerback position...Led the squad with 19 pass deflections.

San Diego State...Made his collegiate debut, posting 3 tackles while making a diving interception in the end zone...Suffered a sprained ankle on that play, an injury that would bother him throughout the rest of the year.

Ohio University and Nevada-Las Vegas...Did not play (ankle).

Northwestern...Returned to action with 4 solo tackles, a stop for a 2-yard loss and a deflected pass.

Indiana...Picked off a pass and batted away another.

Purdue...Returned an interception 52 yards for a touchdown, made 3 solo stops and deflected a pass.

Illinois...Recovered a fumble, returned an interception 22 yards for a touchdown and came up with 5 tackles (4 solos) and a pass deflection.

Iowa...Credited with a 6-tackle (5 solos) performance.

Minnesota...Registered 4 solo tackles with a pair of deflected passes and an interception.

Michigan...Picked off a pass inside the end zone and delivered 7 solo tackles.

Penn State...Followed with 4 solo hits and 2 pass break-ups.

UCLA (Rose Bowl)...Gave the Badgers a 38–31 decision with a game-winning 46-yard interception return for a touchdown in the fourth quarter...Also collected 4 tackles with 4 pass deflections.

1997 SEASON

Redshirted as a freshman.

AGILITY TESTS

4.43 in the 40-yard dash...37.5-inch vertical jump...310-pound bench press.

== Professional career ==
=== Miami Dolphins ===
Fletcher was selected in the first round with the 26th overall pick in the 2001 NFL draft by the Miami Dolphins. He played 41 games for Miami from 2001 to 2003.

=== San Diego Chargers ===
In 2004, Fletcher was traded to the San Diego Chargers. He played for them in 2004 and 2005.

=== Detroit Lions ===
It was announced that Fletcher signed a one-year deal with the Detroit Lions on May 1, 2006. He had a career-high three interceptions for the Lions that season.

=== Houston Texans ===
In 2007 Fletcher signed with the Houston Texans.

=== Cincinnati Bengals ===
Fletcher signed with the Cincinnati Bengals on September 23, 2008. After becoming an unrestricted free agent following the 2008 season, he went unsigned. He was re-signed on August 2, 2009, after rookie cornerback David Jones injured his foot. The Bengals released Fletcher on August 29, ending his NFL career.

== NFL career statistics ==
Legend
**Bold**	Career high

=== Regular season ===
Year	Team	Games		Tackles					Interceptions					Fumbles			
Year	Team	GP	GS	Cmb	Solo	Ast	Sck	TFL	Int	Yds	TD	Lng	PD	FF	FR	Yds	TD
2001	MIA	14	2	10	8	2	0.0	0	0	0	0	0	0	0	0	0	0
2002	MIA	**16**	**4**	37	**35**	2	0.0	0	2	30	0	30	**12**	0	0	0	0
2003	MIA	11	0	8	5	3	0.0	0	0	0	0	0	0	0	0	0	0
2004	SDG	**16**	0	**38**	**35**	3	0.0	1	1	0	0	0	5	0	**1**	**7**	0
2005	SDG	14	0	29	21	**8**	**1.0**	1	1	19	0	19	5	0	0	0	0
2006	DET	13	2	37	**35**	2	0.0	**2**	**3**	**122**	**1**	**88**	6	0	**1**	3	0
2007	HOU	10	2	18	17	1	0.0	0	0	0	0	0	3	**1**	0	0	0
2008	CIN	11	2	16	14	2	0.0	0	0	0	0	0	3	0	**1**	0	0
Career		105	12	193	170	23	1.0	4	7	171	1	88	34	1	3	10	0

=== Playoffs ===
Year	Team	Games		Tackles					Interceptions					Fumbles			
Year	Team	GP	GS	Cmb	Solo	Ast	Sck	TFL	Int	Yds	TD	Lng	PD	FF	FR	Yds	TD
2004	SDG	**1**	0	**7**	**7**	0	0.0	0	0	0	0	0	0	0	0	0	0
Career		1	0	7	7	0	0.0	0	0	0	0	0	0	0	0	0	0

== Personal life ==
His older brother, Jason Fletcher, is a prominent professional sports agent.

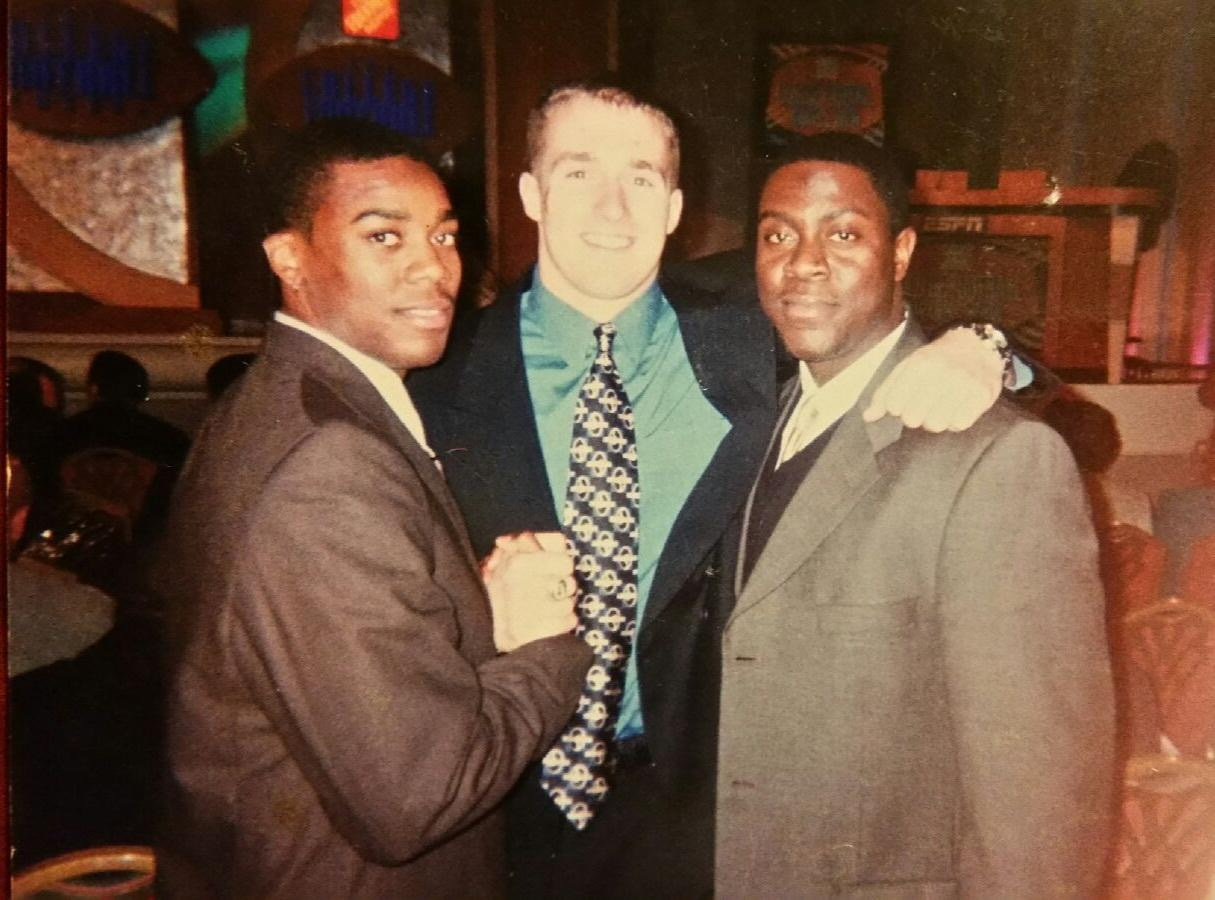
