= Donovan Raiola =

American football player and coach (born 1982)

Profile
- Position: Offensive line coach

Personal information
- Born: December 13, 1982 (age 43); Honolulu, Hawaii, U.S.
- Listed height: 6 ft 2 in (1.88 m)
- Listed weight: 293 lb (133 kg)

Career information
- High school: Kamehameha Schools (Honolulu, Hawaii)
- College: Wisconsin
- NFL draft: 2006: undrafted

Career history

Playing
- St. Louis Rams (2006)*; Amsterdam Admirals (2007); St. Louis Rams (2007)*; Pittsburgh Steelers (2007)*; St. Louis Rams (2007–2008)*; Seattle Seahawks (2008)*; Arizona Cardinals (2009)*; Chicago Bears (2009)*; Tampa Bay Buccaneers (2010)*; Omaha Nighthawks (2010); Tampa Bay Buccaneers (2010); Washington Redskins (2011)*; Omaha Nighthawks (2011)
- * Offseason or practice squad member only

Coaching
- Kapalama HS (HI) (2012–2013) Offensive line coach; Hawaii (2014) Intern; Notre Dame (2015–2016) Graduate assistant; Aurora (2017) Offensive line coach; Chicago Bears (2018–2021) Assistant offensive line coach; Nebraska (2022–2025) Offensive line coach

Career NFL statistics
- Games played: 1
- Stats at Pro Football Reference

Donovan Raiola (/raɪˈoʊlə/ ry-OH-lə; born December 13, 1982) is an American football coach and former player who was most recently the offensive line coach for the Nebraska Cornhuskers. He played professionally in as a center in the National Football League (NFL). Raiola was signed by the St. Louis Rams as an undrafted free agent in 2006. He played college football for the Wisconsin Badgers. He played high school football at Kamehameha Schools in Honolulu, Hawaii.

Raiola was also a member of the Pittsburgh Steelers, Seattle Seahawks, Arizona Cardinals, Chicago Bears, Tampa Bay Buccaneers, Omaha Nighthawks, and Washington Redskins. He is the younger brother of former Nebraska and NFL center Dominic Raiola and the uncle of current Oregon Ducks quarterback Dylan Raiola.

== College career ==
At Wisconsin, Raiola started 39 games and was a team captain for his senior year. He was named an honorable mention to the All-Big Ten Conference team three times.

== Professional career ==
=== Omaha Nighthawks ===
Raiola was signed by the Omaha Nighthawks of the United Football League on September 8, 2010.

=== Tampa Bay Buccaneers ===
On December 7, 2010, Raiola was signed by the Buccaneers to replace injured starter Jeff Faine.

=== Washington Redskins ===
Raiola signed with the Washington Redskins on August 4, 2011.

== Coaching career ==
Raiola served as an intern for the Hawaii Rainbow Warriors football team before joining the Notre Dame Fighting Irish as a graduate assistant, reuniting him with his former offensive line coach with both the Bears and Notre Dame, Harry Hiestand. Hiestand returned to the Bears in 2018, and Raiola followed to serve as the assistant offensive line coach. Raiola coached with the Bears in this capacity through Week 13 of the 2021 NFL season, when he departed to become the offensive line coach for the Nebraska Cornhuskers. Raiola served as the offensive line coach until December 6, 2025 when Nebraska relieved him of his position.
