= Brandon Williams (wide receiver) =

American football player (born 1984)

No. 17, 16, 81, 82
- Position: Wide receiver

Personal information
- Born: February 24, 1984 (age 42); St. Louis, Missouri, U.S.
- Listed height: 5 ft 11 in (1.80 m)
- Listed weight: 175 lb (79 kg)

Career information
- High school: Hazelwood East (St. Louis, Missouri)
- College: Wisconsin
- NFL draft: 2006: 3rd round, 84th overall pick

Career history
- San Francisco 49ers (2006–2007); St. Louis Rams (2007); Pittsburgh Steelers (2009)

Awards and highlights
- Second-team All-American (2005); Second-team All-Big Ten (2005); Second-team Freshman All-American (2002); SN First-team Freshman All-Big Ten (2002)

Career NFL statistics
- Return yards: 1,133
- Stats at Pro Football Reference

Brandon Michael Williams (born February 24, 1984) is an American former professional football player who was a wide receiver in the National Football League (NFL). He played college football for the Wisconsin Badgers and was selected by the San Francisco 49ers in the third round of the 2006 NFL draft. He was also a member of the St. Louis Rams and Pittsburgh Steelers.

== Early life ==
Williams attended Normandy High School played with Laurence Maroney, (RB- New England Patriots) then transferred to Hazelwood East High School, the same high school as fellow and former NFL players Jamar Fletcher (CB – Detroit Lions), Scott Starks, (CB – Jacksonville Jaguars), Terrell Fletcher (former RB – San Diego Chargers), Bryan Fletcher (TE – Indianapolis Colts) and American sports agent Jason Fletcher of B&F Sports. He was named to All-Midlands team by Super Prep and Prep Football Report. He was a two-time, second-team all-state and three-time, first-team all-conference selection. He caught 97 passes for 2,157 yards and returned 58 punts for 1,210 yards and 23 total touchdowns during his career.

== College career ==
As a freshman in 2002, Williams played in all 14 games, including six starts. He was second-team freshman All-American by The Sporting News. He was a first-team freshman All-Big Ten selection by The Sporting News. He had a team-high 52 receptions which was a school freshman record. He broke the school-record with 32 kickoff returns for a school-record 670 yards.

Williams started 12 games as sophomore in 2003. He was the team's No. 2 receiver with 49 catches and one touchdown. He led Badgers with 1,319 all-purpose yards. He ranked seventh in Big Ten with a 21.6-yard kickoff return average.

In 2004, Williams led the Badgers with 42 receptions and 517 receiving yards. He was second on the team with 1,010 all-purpose yards. He was an honorable mention All-Big Ten pick.

Williams was named a second-team All-Big Ten selection as a senior in 2005, hauling in 59 passes for 1,095 yards (18.6 avg.) and six touchdowns. He also rushed seven times for 47 yards (6.71 avg.). He ran back 26 punts, taking in two for touchdowns.

== Professional career ==
Pre-draft measurables
Height	Weight	Arm length	Hand span	40-yard dash	10-yard split	20-yard split	20-yard shuttle	Three-cone drill	Vertical jump	Broad jump
5 ft 9 3/8 in (1.76 m)	179 lb (81 kg)	29 3/8 in (0.75 m)	8 3/8 in (0.21 m)	4.51 s	1.56 s	2.60 s	4.07 s	6.87 s	34.5 in (0.88 m)	9 ft 7 in (2.92 m)
All values from NFL Combine
