= Barry Alvarez =

American football player, coach, and administrator (born 1946)

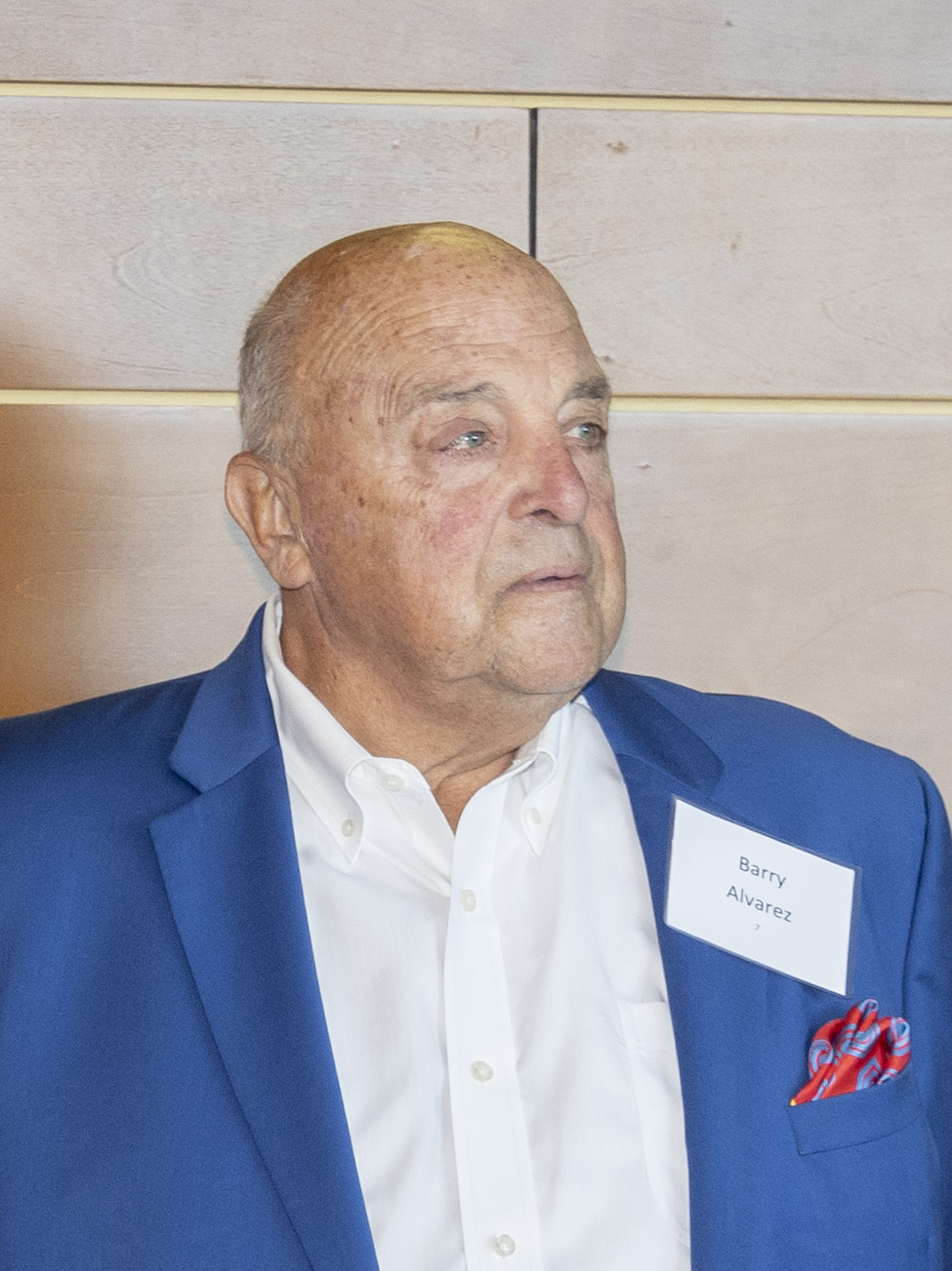
- Alvarez in 2024

Biographical details
- Born: December 30, 1946 (age 79); Langeloth, Pennsylvania, U.S.

Playing career
- 1965–1967: Nebraska
- Position: Linebacker

Coaching career (HC unless noted)
- 1971–1973: Lincoln NE HS (NE) (assistant)
- 1974–1975: Lexington HS (NE)
- 1976–1978: Mason City HS (IA)
- 1979–1986: Iowa (LB)
- 1987: Notre Dame (LB)
- 1988–1989: Notre Dame (DC)
- 1990–2005: Wisconsin
- 2012: Wisconsin (interim HC)
- 2014: Wisconsin (interim HC)

Administrative career (AD unless noted)
- 2004–2021: Wisconsin

Head coaching record
- Overall: 119–73–4 (college)
- Bowls: 9–4

Accomplishments and honors

Championships
- 3 Big Ten (1993, 1998, 1999)

Awards
- AFCA Coach of the Year (1993); Bobby Dodd Coach of the Year Award (1993); 2× Big Ten Coach of the Year (1993, 1998); Second-team All-Big Eight (1967); Wisconsin Football Coaches Association (WFCA) Hall of Fame (inducted in 1999)
- College Football Hall of Fame; Inducted in 2010 (profile)

Barry Lee Alvarez (born December 30, 1946) is an American former college football coach and athletic director at the University of Wisconsin–Madison. He served as the head football coach at Wisconsin for 16 seasons, from 1990 to 2005, compiling a career record of 119–72–4. He has the longest head coaching tenure and the most wins in Wisconsin Badgers football history. Alvarez stepped down as head coach after the 2005 season, and remained as athletic director until July 1, 2021.

Since retiring, Alvarez has served as interim head coach on two occasions. He coached Wisconsin in the 2013 Rose Bowl, after the departure of Bret Bielema to the University of Arkansas, and in the 2015 Outback Bowl, following the departure of Gary Andersen to Oregon State University.

Alvarez was inducted to the College Football Hall of Fame as a coach in 2010. In honor of his accomplishments, the Badgers announced in 2021 that the field within Camp Randall would be renamed to Barry Alvarez Field.

== Early life ==
Alvarez was born and raised in Langeloth, Pennsylvania, where his family settled after his grandparents emigrated to the United States from Spain. He graduated from Burgettstown Union High School in Burgettstown, Pennsylvania, and is a graduate of the University of Nebraska–Lincoln, where he played linebacker from 1966 to 1968 under Bob Devaney, who became one of his major coaching influences along with Hayden Fry and Lou Holtz. Alvarez intercepted a pass in a game played between the Cornhuskers and the Badgers in Madison. Alvarez was an assistant coach in charge of the defense at Lincoln Northeast High School football team in Lincoln, Nebraska where his undefeated team won the City Championship, Trans-Nebraska Championship and were Co-Champions for the State of Nebraska, Class 'A' in 1972. The team also won the I-80 Conference Championship Trophy, the Omaha World-Herald Merit Award and the Lincoln Journal and Star State Class 'A' Football Champion Award. They have just celebrated their 50th Anniversary, on 23 September 2022, of that monumental event in which no team has matched that record in 50-years at the school. During that year his team played against and beat the Southeast Knights football team, coached by Frank Solich. Alvarez later became a head coach at Lexington High School in Lexington, Nebraska and then Mason City High School in Mason City, Iowa where the Mohawks won the 1978 class 4A state title, 15–13, over Dubuque Hempstead before becoming an assistant coach at University of Iowa and then at the University of Notre Dame.

From 1979 to 1986 at Iowa, Alvarez would coach linebackers such as Leven Weiss, Todd Simonsen, Mel Cole, James Erb, Jonathan Hayes, and Larry Station.

In 1987, Alvarez would coach linebacker Wes Pritchett. In 1988, he led the defense of a Notre Dame team that finished 12–0 as national champions. They finished 3rd in points allowed on the season. The players he coached that year included DL Jeff Alm, LB Frank Stams, and DB Todd Lyght. In 1989, the Notre Dame defense finished 9th in points allowed and the team finished 12–1.

== Head coaching career ==
In 1990, Alvarez was named head coach of the Wisconsin Badgers. He inherited a program that had not had a winning season since 1984, and had only won seven games in Big Ten Conference play in that time.

Considering the awful state of the program he'd inherited, Alvarez engineered a very quick return to respectability. In recruiting players, Alvarez made the decision to "build a wall" around the state of Wisconsin, to make sure all of the state's top recruits were going to be recruited to the program. He also encouraged walk-on players to try out for the team. According to Alvarez, he looked for two kinds of players for his team: Players who loved football, and players that were tough. He won only eleven games in his first three seasons (including a 1–10 record in his first year). However, the 1992 team showed signs of the future to come. That team upset Ohio State on national television, and four of its losses were by a touchdown or less. One of those losses, to Northwestern, kept Wisconsin out of a bowl.

The Badgers steamrolled through the 1993 season, notching a 10–1–1 mark and their first Rose Bowl appearance since 1963, along with only the second bowl win in school history. During his tenure, the Badgers won or shared three Big Ten titles and played in three Rose Bowls (1994, 1999 and 2000), winning all three of them. He also led the Badgers to 11 bowl games, winning 8 of them; before his arrival they had been to only six bowls in their entire history, with only one win. The 1998 team notched the first 11-win season in school history, while the 1999 team won the school's first outright Big Ten title in 37 years.

Alvarez retired for the first time at Wisconsin with a win over the Auburn Tigers in the 2006 Capital One Bowl. Following his two interim stints as the team's coach, his all-time record at Wisconsin to 120–73–4 (.619), making him far and away the winningest coach in school history; his 120 wins are almost double those of runner-up Phillip King. His record in bowl games is 9–4 (.692).

Alvarez is the only Big Ten Conference coach to win consecutive Rose Bowls. Prior to his first return as interim coach, his 3–0 Rose Bowl record as a full-time coach had placed him third on the list of undefeated Rose Bowl records, behind USC's Howard Jones (5–0) and John Robinson (4–0). On December 5, 2012, the day after the 2012 Big Ten Championship Game, Badgers head coach Bret Bielema announced he would be leaving to take the Arkansas head coaching position and revealed to the media that Alvarez would be the interim coach for the Badgers in the 2013 Rose Bowl. The Badgers lost that game to the Stanford Cardinal 20–14, dropping Alvarez's Rose Bowl record to 3–1.

Alvarez is the only Big Ten coach with consecutive wins over the Ohio State Buckeyes during Jim Tressel's coaching tenure there; those came in 2003 and 2004. He finished his career with a 3–1 edge over Tressel. Alvarez had six seasons with at least nine wins at Wisconsin. Prior to his arrival, the Badgers had recorded only four in nearly 100 seasons (1897–1899, 1901). (Wisconsin has regularly played a season schedule of nine or more games from 1942 onward.)

== Life after coaching ==
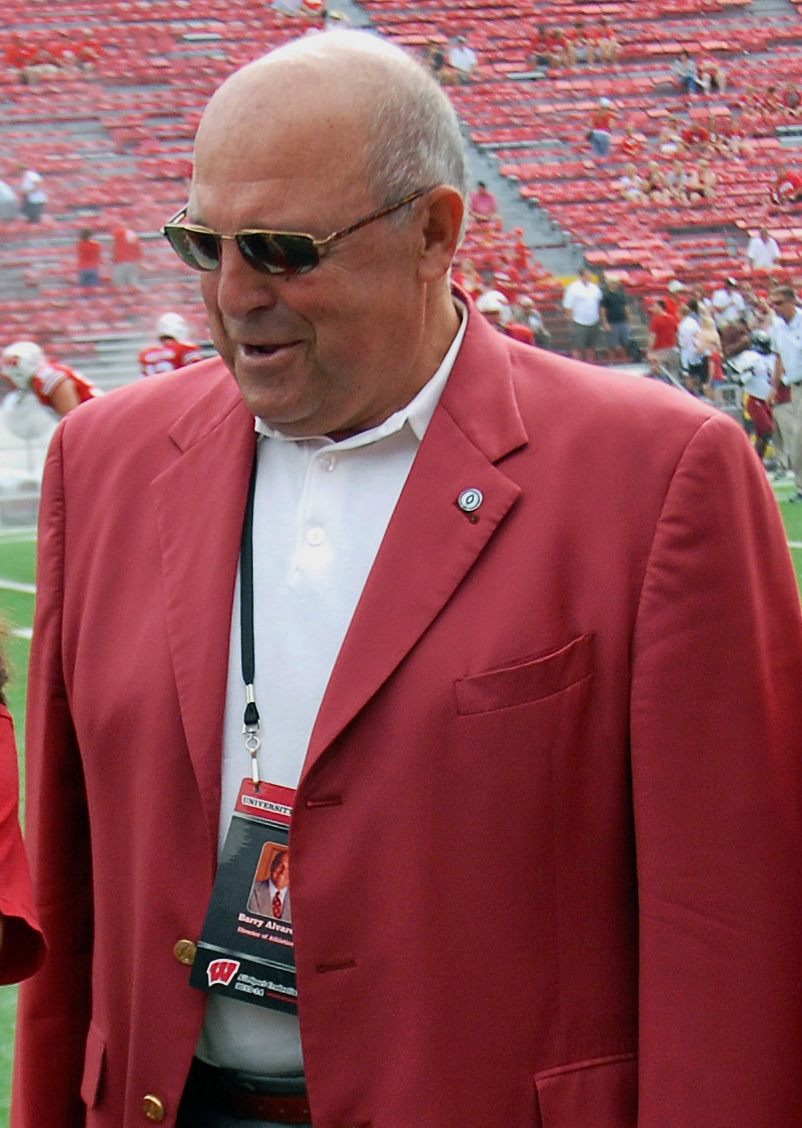
Alvarez in 2013

Alvarez replaced Pat Richter as athletic director in 2004 while retaining the head coaching position. After the 2005 season, Alvarez stepped down as head coach. Due to his continuing role as athletic director, Alvarez had the rare opportunity to choose his successor. Alvarez promoted his defensive coordinator, Bret Bielema.

In 2006, Alvarez released his autobiography, Don't Flinch, co-authored by Mike Lucas.

During the 2006–07 bowl season, Alvarez worked as a color commentator/analyst for Fox Sports. He worked both the 2007 Fiesta Bowl and 2007 BCS National Championship Game as well as select NFL games.

In 2010, it was revealed that he had invested $600,000 in the Ponzi scheme perpetrated by Nevin Shapiro.

Starting with the 2014 NCAA Division I FBS football season, the Bowl Championship Series was abandoned in favor of a four-team playoff to determine a national champion. Alvarez was one of the thirteen inaugural members of the College Football Playoff selection committee.

== Honors and awards ==
Prior to his arrival at Wisconsin, Alvarez was part of Lou Holtz's staff at Notre Dame from 1987 to 1989. He was the defensive coordinator for the 1988 and 1989 teams which lost a single game in these two seasons and were named national champions in 1988.

During his head coaching tenure, Alvarez received national recognition as the recipient of the AFCA Coach of the Year and Bobby Dodd Coach of the Year Award in 1993. He was twice honored as the Big Ten Conference Coach of the Year, in 1993 and 1998.

In 1994, Babcock Dairy Store, run by the UW–Madison's Department of Food Science, College of Agricultural and Life Sciences, developed an ice cream flavor called "Berry Alvarez", a mixture of raspberry, strawberry, and blueberry, in his honor. In 2001, Hispanic Business magazine named Barry Alvarez one of the "100 Most Influential Hispanics".

On October 13, 2006, a bronze statue of Alvarez was unveiled in the Kellner Plaza of Camp Randall Stadium. The statue honoring Alvarez had been announced the previous year, at his last home game as head coach.

In 2009, Alvarez was inducted into the Wisconsin Athletic Hall of Fame and the Rose Bowl Hall of Fame. On May 27, 2010, it was announced that Alvarez would be inducted into the College Football Hall of Fame as part of the 2010 class. It was further revealed that the induction vote for Alvarez was unanimous.

== Head coaching record ==
=== College ===
| Year | Team | Overall | Conference | Standing | Bowl/playoffs | Coaches^{#} | AP^{°} |
|---|---|---|---|---|---|---|---|
Wisconsin Badgers (Big Ten Conference) (1990–2005)
| 1990 | Wisconsin | 1–10 | 0–8 | 10th | | | |
| 1991 | Wisconsin | 5–6 | 2–6 | T–8th | | | |
| 1992 | Wisconsin | 5–6 | 3–5 | T–6th | | | |
| 1993 | Wisconsin | 10–1–1 | 6–1–1 | T–1st | W Rose | 5 | 6 |
| 1994 | Wisconsin | 8–3–1 | 5–2–1 | 4th | W Hall of Fame | | |
| 1995 | Wisconsin | 4–5–2 | 3–4–1 | T–7th | | | |
| 1996 | Wisconsin | 8–5 | 3–5 | 7th | W Copper | | |
| 1997 | Wisconsin | 8–5 | 5–3 | 5th | L Outback | | |
| 1998 | Wisconsin | 11–1 | 7–1 | T–1st | W Rose^{†} | 5 | 6 |
| 1999 | Wisconsin | 10–2 | 7–1 | 1st | W Rose^{†} | 4 | 4 |
| 2000 | Wisconsin | 9–4 | 4–4 | T–5th | W Sun | 24 | 23 |
| 2001 | Wisconsin | 5–7 | 3–5 | T–8th | | | |
| 2002 | Wisconsin | 8–6 | 2–6 | T–8th | W Alamo | | |
| 2003 | Wisconsin | 7–6 | 4–4 | T–7th | L Music City | | |
| 2004 | Wisconsin | 9–3 | 6–2 | 3rd | L Outback | 18 | 17 |
| 2005 | Wisconsin | 10–3 | 5–3 | T–3rd | W Capital One | 15 | 15 |
Wisconsin Badgers (Big Ten Conference) (2012)
| 2012 | Wisconsin | 0–1 | 0–0 | | L Rose^{†} | | |
Wisconsin Badgers (Big Ten Conference) (2014)
| 2014 | Wisconsin | 1–0 | 0–0 | | W Outback | 13 | 13 |
| Wisconsin: | | 119–72–4 | 65–60–3 | | | | |
| Total: | | 119–72–4 | | | | | |
National championship Conference title Conference division title or championship game berth
^{†}Indicates BCS bowl.; ^{#}Rankings from final Coaches Poll.; ^{°}Rankings from final AP Poll.
