= Brian Calhoun =

American gridiron football player (born 1984)

No. 29
- Position: Running back

Personal information
- Born: May 8, 1984 (age 42); Atlanta, Georgia, U.S.
- Listed height: 5 ft 9 in (1.75 m)
- Listed weight: 202 lb (92 kg)

Career information
- High school: Oak Creek (Oak Creek, Wisconsin)
- College: Wisconsin
- NFL draft: 2006: 3rd round, 74th overall pick

Career history
- Detroit Lions (2006–2008)

Awards and highlights
- Second-team All-American (2005); First-team All-Big Ten (2005); 2006 Capital One Bowl MVP

Career NFL statistics
- Rushing attempts: 14
- Rushing yards: 54
- Receptions: 7
- Receiving yards: 55
- Return yards: 221
- Stats at Pro Football Reference

Brian Calhoun (born May 8, 1984) is an American former professional football player who was a running back for the Detroit Lions of the National Football League (NFL). He played college football for the Wisconsin Badgers and was selected by the Detroit Lions in the third round of the 2006 NFL draft.

== Early life ==
Calhoun achieved numerous honors playing high school football and track and field at Oak Creek High School in Oak Creek, Wisconsin. He rushed for over 5,000 yards, scored 82 touchdowns, was named the Gatorade State Player of the Year, team MVP, All-America, first-team all-state, and was ranked the nation's 12th best running back by Rivals.com.

=== Track and field ===
Also a standout track athlete, Calhoun was named the Track and Field MVP for four years and was a member of the 2001 USA Junior Team that competed at the World Youth Championships in Hungary, placing seventh in the long jump, with a leap of 7.39 meters. Because of NCAA transfer rules, Brian had to sit out the entire 2004 season. However, he kept himself busy by participating on the scout team and on the 4 x 100 metres relay team. The relay team would go on to become the 2005 Big Ten Conference champions.

He ran the 100 meters in 10.5 seconds and the 200 meters in 21.2 seconds, and participated in the high jump, posting a best leap of 2.07 meter. He ran the 200 meters and took part in the long jump competition at both the Air Force Classic and Frank Sevigne Invite, while advancing to the Big 12 Championships in the long jump. Calhoun earned a pair of 13th-place finishes in the 200 meters.

== College career ==
After playing football at Colorado for his freshman (2002) and sophomore (2003) years, Calhoun decided to return home and attend the University of Wisconsin–Madison. During his two years at Colorado, Calhoun was named the ABC Player of the Game against Nebraska in 2002 and again against Florida State in 2003. Named the Player of the game against Iowa State, Kansas State and was named honorable mention All Big 12. Because of NCAA transfer rules, Brian had to sit out the entire 2004 season. However, he kept himself busy by participating on the scout team and on the 4 × 100-meter relay team. The relay team would go on to become the 2005 Big Ten Conference champions.

In the 2003 season, Calhoun took over for an injured Bobby Purify and carried the ball 195 times for 810 yards and 5 touchdowns. Calhoun enjoyed a fantastic 2005 with the Wisconsin Badgers by leading the nation with 348 rushing touches for 1,636 yards and 53 receiving touches for 571 yards. He finished with 22 rushing and 2 receiving touchdowns. His 22 rushing touchdowns were a school record. In addition, his 2,207 all purpose yards, ranks 2nd in school history. Became the 2nd player in Big Ten history with 1000 rushing and 500 receiving yards in one season. Became the 2nd player in NCAA history with 1,500 yards rushing and 500 receiving yards in one a season [first done in 1991]. Was named to the Big Ten First-team, 2nd Team All-American by the Associated Press and Sports Illustrated. Named as a semifinalist for the Maxwell Award, Doak Walker Award and blossomed into a dark horse Heisman Trophy candidate, but faded towards the end of the season. Calhoun was named the MVP of the 2006 Capital One Bowl, after gaining 213 yards and scoring a touchdown in the Wisconsin Badgers victory over the Auburn Tigers.

== Professional career ==
Pre-draft measurables
Height	Weight	Arm length	Hand span	40-yard dash	10-yard split	20-yard split	20-yard shuttle	Three-cone drill	Vertical jump	Broad jump	Bench press
5 ft 9 1/4 in (1.76 m)	201 lb (91 kg)	29 1/8 in (0.74 m)	9 in (0.23 m)	4.62 s	1.58 s	2.64 s	4.20 s	7.05 s	31.5 in (0.80 m)	10 ft 4 in (3.15 m)	18 reps
All values from NFL Combine

Calhoun decided to forgo his senior season at Wisconsin and entered the 2006 NFL draft. He was selected in the third round (pick #74) by the Detroit Lions. Calhoun was placed on injured reserve for the season in November after tearing his ACL.

Calhoun was released on May 4, 2009, finishing his Lions career with 54 rushing yards, 55 receiving yards and 221 kick return yards and 0 touchdowns.

== Personal life ==
After his playing career, he became a high school coach for track and field, football, and sports fitness training in the greater Milwaukee area. He is also a fitness trainer at DSHA (Divine Savior Holy Angels) in Milwaukee, Wisconsin.
