= List of Wisconsin Badgers football seasons =

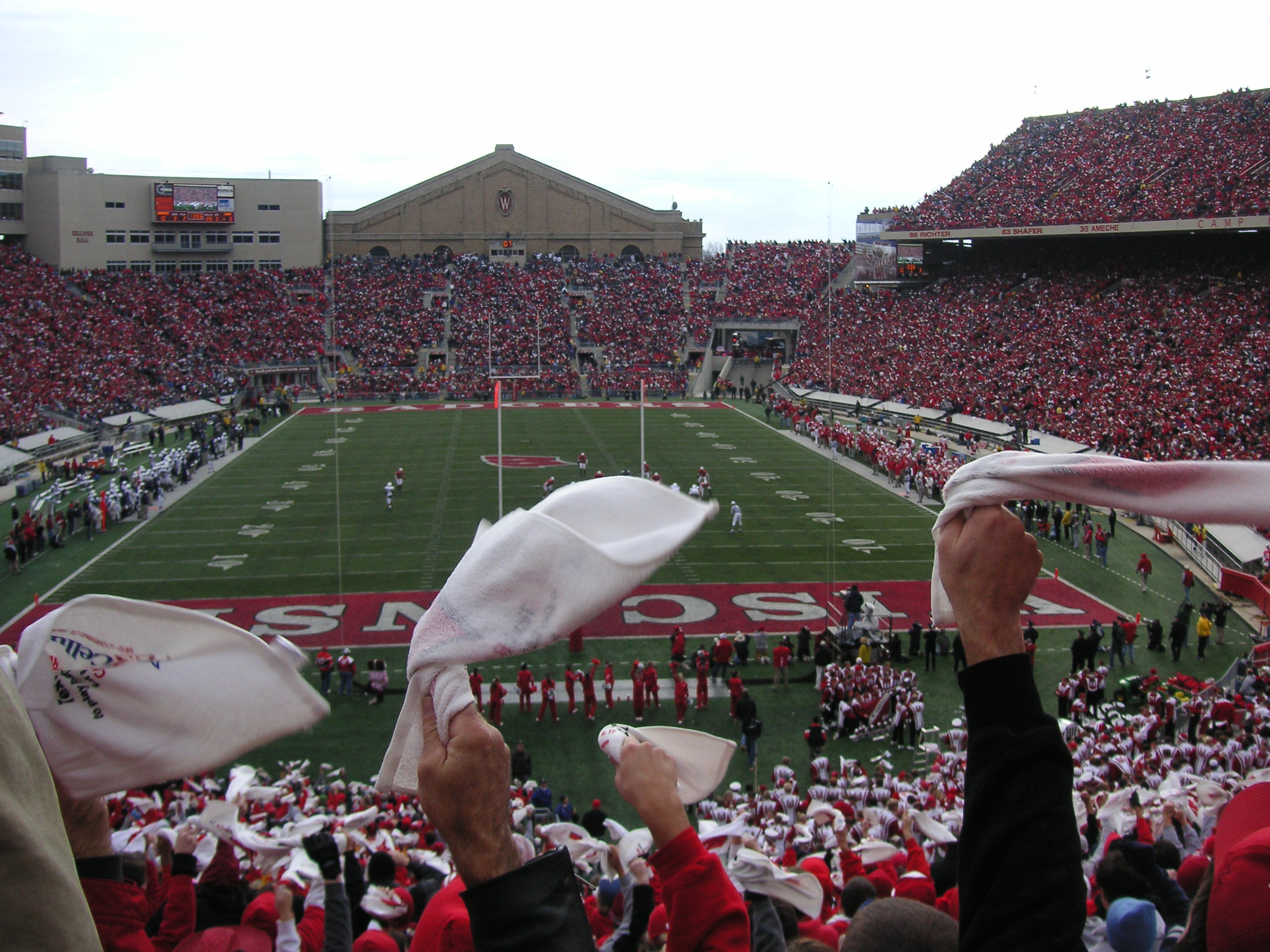
Camp Randall Stadium, where the Badgers have played since 1917.

The Wisconsin Badgers college football team competes as part of the National Collegiate Athletic Association (NCAA) Division I Football Bowl Subdivision, representing the University of Wisconsin–Madison in the West Division of the Big Ten Conference. Wisconsin was one of seven original founding members of the Big Ten Conference, then known as the Western Conference, in 1896. Wisconsin has played their home games at Camp Randall Stadium in Madison, Wisconsin since 1917.

Since the team's first season in 1889, the Badgers have participated in more than 1,100 officially sanctioned games, including 34 bowl games, and have finished in the top 25 of the national polls 27 times. Wisconsin is one of 26 college football programs to win 700 or more games. Since 1993, the Badgers have appeared in 29 bowl games in 31 seasons and won at least a share of the conference championship six times.

== Seasons ==
Year	Coach	Overall	Conference	Standing	Bowl/playoffs	Coaches^{#}	AP^{°}
Alvin Kletsch (Independent) (1889)
1889	Alvin Kletsch	0–2					
Ted Mestre (Independent) (1890)
1890	Ted Mestre	1–3					
Herb Alward (Independent) (1891)
1891	Herb Alward	3–1–1					
Frank Crawford (IAANW) (1892)
1892	Frank Crawford	4–3	2–2	2nd			
Parke H. Davis (IAANW) (1893)
1893	Parke H. Davis	4–2	1–1	2nd			
Hiram O. Stickney (Independent) (1894–1895)
1894	Hiram O. Stickney	5–2					
1895	Hiram O. Stickney	5–2–1					
Philip King (Western) (1896–1902)
1896	Philip King	7–1–1	2–0–1	1st			
1897	Philip King	9–1	3–0	1st			
1898	Philip King	9–1	2–1	3rd			
1899	Philip King	9–2	4–1	2nd			
1900	Philip King	8–1	2–1	T–3rd			
1901	Philip King	9–0	2–0	T–1st			
1902	Philip King	6–3	1–3	6th			
Arthur H. Curtis (Western) (1903–1904)
1903	Arthur H. Curtis	6–3–1	0–3–1	T–8th			
1904	Arthur H. Curtis	5–3	0–3	T–7th			
Philip King (Western) (1905)
1905	Philip King	8–2	1–2	T–5th			
Charles P. Hutchins (Western) (1906–1907)
1906	Charles P. Hutchins	5–0	3–0	T–1st			
1907	Charles P. Hutchins	3–1–1	3–1–1	2nd			
Thomas A. Barry (Western) (1908–1910)
1908	Thomas A. Barry	5–1	2–1	3rd			
1909	Thomas A. Barry	3–1–1	2–1–1	4th			
1910	Thomas A. Barry	1–2–2	1–2–1	5th			
John R. Richards (Western) (1911)
1911	John R. Richards	5–1–1	2–1–1	3rd			
William J. Juneau (Western) (1912–1915)
1912	William J. Juneau	7–0	5–0	1st			
1913	William J. Juneau	3–3–1	1–2–1	T–6th			
1914	William J. Juneau	4–2–1	2–2–1	T–4th			
1915	William J. Juneau	4–3	2–3	6th			
Paul O. Withington (Western) (1916)
1916	Paul O. Withington	4–2–1	1–2–1	T–6th			
John R. Richards (Western) (1917)
1917	John R. Richards	4–2–1	3–2	T–3rd			
Guy S. Lowman (Western) (1918)
1918	Guy S. Lowman	3–3	1–2	7th			
John R. Richards (Western) (1919–1922)
1919	John R. Richards	5–2	3–2	4th			
1920	John R. Richards	6–1	4–1	2nd			
1921	John R. Richards	5–1–1	3–1–1	4th			
1922	John R. Richards	4–2–1	2–2–1	4th			
John J. Ryan (Western) (1923–1924)
1923	John J. Ryan	3–3–1	1–3–1	7th			
1924	John J. Ryan	2–3–3	0–2–2	10th			
George Little (Western) (1925–1926)
1925	George Little	6–1–1	3–1–1	T–2nd			
1926	George Little	5–2–1	3–2–1	5th			
Glenn Thistlethwaite (Western) (1927–1931)
1927	Glenn Thistlethwaite	4–4	1–4	T–9th			
1928	Glenn Thistlethwaite	7–1–1	3–1–1	2nd			
1929	Glenn Thistlethwaite	4–5	1–4	10th			
1930	Glenn Thistlethwaite	6–2–1	2–2–1	T–4th			
1931	Glenn Thistlethwaite	5–4–1	3–3	6th			
Clarence Spears (Western) (1932–1935)
1932	Clarence Spears	6–1–1	4–1–1	3rd			
1933	Clarence Spears	2–5–1	0–5–1	T–8th			
1934	Clarence Spears	4–4	2–3	T–5th			
1935	Clarence Spears	1–7	1–4	T–9th			
Harry Stuhldreher (Western) (1936–1948)
1936	Harry Stuhldreher	2–6	0–4	T–8th			
1937	Harry Stuhldreher	4–3–1	2–2–1	T–4th			
1938	Harry Stuhldreher	5–3	3–2	6th			
1939	Harry Stuhldreher	1–6–1	0–5–1	T–9th			
1940	Harry Stuhldreher	4–4	3–3	T–4th			
1941	Harry Stuhldreher	3–5	3–3	5th			
1942	Harry Stuhldreher	8–1–1	4–1	2nd			3
1943	Harry Stuhldreher	1–9	1–6	8th			
1944	Harry Stuhldreher	3–6	2–4	7th			
1945	Harry Stuhldreher	3–4–2	2–3–1	6th			
1946	Harry Stuhldreher	4–5	2–5	8th			
1947	Harry Stuhldreher	5–3–1	3–2–1	2nd			
1948	Harry Stuhldreher	2–7	1–5	9th			
Ivan Williamson (Western / Big Ten) (1949–1955)
1949	Ivan Williamson	5–3–1	3–2–1	4th			
1950	Ivan Williamson	6–3	5–2	T–2nd			
1951	Ivan Williamson	7–1–1	5–1–1	2nd		8	8
1952	Ivan Williamson	6–3–1	4–1–1	1st	L Rose	10	11
1953	Ivan Williamson	6–2–1	4–1–1	3rd		14	15
1954	Ivan Williamson	7–2	5–2	2nd		10	9
1955	Ivan Williamson	4–5	3–4	6th			
Milton Bruhn (Big Ten) (1956–1966)
1956	Milton Bruhn	1–5–3	0–4–3	9th			
1957	Milton Bruhn	6–3	4–3	T–4th		14	19
1958	Milton Bruhn	7–1–1	5–1–1	2nd		6	7
1959	Milton Bruhn	7–3	5–2	1st	L Rose	6	6
1960	Milton Bruhn	4–5	2–5	9th			
1961	Milton Bruhn	6–3	4–3	5th		18	
1962	Milton Bruhn	8–2	6–1	1st	L Rose	2	2
1963	Milton Bruhn	5–4	3–4	5th			
1964	Milton Bruhn	3–6	2–5	T–7th			
1965	Milton Bruhn	2–7–1	2–5	T–7th			
1966	Milton Bruhn	3–6–1	2–4–1	T–7th			
John Coatta (Big Ten) (1967–1969)
1967	John Coatta	0–9–1	0–6–1	T–9th			
1968	John Coatta	0–10	0–7	10th			
1969	John Coatta	3–7	3–4	T–5th			
John Jardine (Big Ten) (1970–1977)
1970	John Jardine	4–5–1	3–4	T–5th			
1971	John Jardine	4–6–1	3–5	T–6th			
1972	John Jardine	4–7	2–6	9th			
1973	John Jardine	4–7	3–5	8th			
1974	John Jardine	7–4	5–3	4th			
1975	John Jardine	4–6–1	3–4–1	6th			
1976	John Jardine	5–6	3–5	T–7th			
1977	John Jardine	5–6	3–6	8th			
Dave McClain (Big Ten) (1978–1985)
1978	Dave McClain	5–4–2	3–4–2	6th			
1979	Dave McClain	4–7	3–5	T–7th			
1980	Dave McClain	4–7	3–5	T–6th			
1981	Dave McClain	7–5	6–3	T–3rd	L Garden State		
1982	Dave McClain	7–5	5–4	4th	W Independence		
1983	Dave McClain	7–4	5–4	4th			
1984	Dave McClain	7–4–1	5–3–1	4th	L Hall of Fame Classic		
1985	Dave McClain	5–6	2–6	8th			
Jim Hilles (Big Ten) (1986)
1986	Jim Hilles (Note: After Dave McClain's death on April 28, 1986, Hilles was named interim head football coach for the 1986 season.)	3–9	2–6	T–8th			
Don Morton (Big Ten) (1987–1989)
1987	Don Morton	3–8	1–7	10th			
1988	Don Morton	1–10	1–7	T–9th			
1989	Don Morton	2–9	1–7	9th			
Barry Alvarez (Big Ten) (1990–2005)
1990	Barry Alvarez	1–10	0–8	10th			
1991	Barry Alvarez	5–6	2–6	T–8th			
1992	Barry Alvarez	5–6	3–5	T–6th			
1993	Barry Alvarez	10–1–1	6–1–1	T–1st	W Rose	5	6
1994	Barry Alvarez	8–3–1 (Note: Michigan State self-forfeited all wins in the 1994 season, resulting in Wisconsin's 1994 loss to Michigan State being retroactively changed to a win.)	5–2–1	3rd	W Hall of Fame		
1995	Barry Alvarez	4–5–2	3–4–1	T–7th			
1996	Barry Alvarez	8–5	3–5	7th	W Copper		
1997	Barry Alvarez	8–5	5–3	5th	L Outback		
1998	Barry Alvarez	11–1	7–1	T–1st	W Rose^{†}	5	6
1999	Barry Alvarez	10–2	7–1	1st	W Rose^{†}	4	4
2000	Barry Alvarez	9–4	4–4	T–5th	W Sun	24	23
2001	Barry Alvarez	5–7	3–5	T–8th			
2002	Barry Alvarez	8–6	2–6	T–8th	W Alamo		
2003	Barry Alvarez	7–6	4–4	T–7th	L Music City		
2004	Barry Alvarez	9–3	6–2	3rd	L Outback	18	17
2005	Barry Alvarez	10–3	5–3	T–3rd	W Capital One	15	15
Bret Bielema (Big Ten) (2006–2012)
2006	Bret Bielema	12–1	7–1	T–2nd	W Capital One	5	7
2007	Bret Bielema	9–4	5–3	4th	L Outback	21	24
2008	Bret Bielema	7–6	3–5	T–6th	L Champs Sports		
2009	Bret Bielema	10–3	5–3	T–4th	W Champs Sports	16	16
2010	Bret Bielema	11–2	7–1	T–1st	L Rose^{†}	8	7
2011	Bret Bielema	11–3	6–2	1st (Leaders)	L Rose^{†}	11	10
2012	Bret Bielema (Note: On December 5, 2012, the day after the 2012 Big Ten Championship Game, Badgers head coach Bret Bielema announced he would be leaving to take the Arkansas head coaching position and revealed to the media that Barry Alvarez would be the interim coach for the Badgers in the 2013 Rose Bowl.)	8–6	4–4	3rd (Leaders)	L Rose^{†}		
Gary Andersen (Big Ten) (2013–2014)
2013	Gary Andersen	9–4	6–2	2nd (Leaders)	L Capital One	21	22
2014	Gary Andersen (Note: Several days after the Big Ten Championship game in early December, head coach Gary Andersen stepped down to become the head coach at Oregon State of the Pac-12 Conference. Athletic director and former Badger head coach Barry Alvarez was the interim head coach for the Outback Bowl against Auburn.)	11–3	7–1	1st (West)	W Outback	13	13
Paul Chryst (Big Ten) (2015–2022)
2015	Paul Chryst	10–3	6–2	T–2nd (West)	W Holiday	21	21
2016	Paul Chryst	11–3	7–2	1st (West)	W Cotton^{†}	9	9
2017	Paul Chryst	13–1	9–0	1st (West)	W Orange^{†}	6	7
2018	Paul Chryst	8–5	5–4	T–2nd (West)	W Pinstripe		
2019	Paul Chryst	10–4	7–2	T–1st (West)	L Rose^{†}	13	11
2020	Paul Chryst	4–3	3–3	3rd (West)	W Duke's Mayo		
2021	Paul Chryst	9–4	6–3	T–2nd (West)	W Las Vegas		
2022	Paul Chryst (Note: The Badgers were led by head coach Paul Chryst, who was in his eighth season as head coach, until his dismissal on October 2. Defensive coordinator Jim Leonhard assumed interim head coaching duties after the dismissal of Chryst.)	7–6	4–5	5th (West)	W Guaranteed Rate		
Luke Fickell (Big Ten) (2023–present)
2023	Luke Fickell	7–6	5–4	T–2nd (West)	L ReliaQuest		
2024	Luke Fickell	5–7	3–6	13th			
2025	Luke Fickell	4–8	2–7	T–14th			
Total:		747–525–53					
National championship Conference title Conference division title or championship game berth
^{†}Indicates Bowl Coalition, Bowl Alliance, BCS, or CFP / New Years' Six bowl.; ^{#}Rankings from final Coaches Poll.
