= Flambeau League =

Wisconsin high school athletic conference (1939-1970)

The Flambeau League is a former high school athletic conference with its membership concentrated in northwestern Wisconsin. Founded in 1939 and disbanded in 1970, the conference and its member schools belonged to the Wisconsin Interscholastic Athletic Association.

== History ==
=== 1939-1950 ===
Location of Original Flambeau League Members

The Flambeau League was formed in 1939 by five small high schools in northwestern Wisconsin: Butternut, Draper-Loretta, Fifield, Glidden and Winter. Original members were located in four counties (Ashland, Lincoln, Price and Sawyer) and the conference was named after the Flambeau River, which ran through the conference's geographic area. During that same time period, there was a conference running concurrently called the Flambeau-Soo League, which contained current Flambeau League and former Soo Line Athletic League schools. There were five dual members for most of this alignment's history with the exception of the 1945-46 season, when Fifield was solely a member of the Flambeau-Soo League. This dual-conference arrangement lasted until 1946, when the Flambeau-Soo was disbanded. Former Flambeau-Soo League members Prentice were immediately welcomed into the Flambeau League for the 1945-46 school year, along with the re-entry of Fifield.

=== 1950-1962 ===
Location of Flambeau League Members (1955-1961)

The entry of Tripoli into the fold brought the Flambeau League to seven members for the 1950-51 season. Two years later, the Flambeau League lost Draper-Loretta when it was consolidated into fellow conference member Winter. Hawkins moved over from the similarly named Flambeauland Conference to replace them, maintaining the size of the membership roster at seven. Three years later, the Flambeauland Conference disbanded, and former members Ingram-Glen Flora joined as the Flambeau League's eighth member in 1955. Their time in the league would be short-lived, as they were merged with Tony in 1961 to form the new Flambeau High School, with the new school inheriting Tony's Lakeland Conference membership. The next year, Fifield was consolidated into nearby Park Falls, and two schools displaced by the cessation of the 3-C Conference (Rib Lake and Westboro) entered the Flambeau League as replacements, increasing membership back to eight schools.

=== 1962-1970 ===
Location of Final Flambeau League Members

In the late 1960s, the Flambeau League continued to lose members to both rural school district consolidation and membership in other conferences. Hawkins and Westboro left the conference in 1967, with Hawkins' consolidation into Ladysmith and the folding of Westboro into Rib Lake. In 1968, Winter left to join the Lakeland Conference, decreasing the roster to five member schools. The conference lost another member in 1969 due to Tripoli's consolidation into Prentice's district. The four remaining schools competed for one more season before disbanding the Flambeau League in 1970. Butternut and Glidden joined the Indianhead Conference, Prentice became members of the Lakeland Conference and Rib Lake was accepted into the Marawood Conference.

== Conference membership history ==
=== Final members ===
School	Location	Affiliation	Mascot	Colors	Joined	Left	Conference Joined	Current Conference
Butternut	Butternut, WI	Public	Midgets		1939	1970	Indianhead	Northern Lights
Glidden	Glidden, WI	Public	Vikings/ Black Bears		1939	1970	Indianhead	Closed in 2009 (merged into Chequamegon)
Prentice	Prentice, WI	Public	Buccaneers		1946	1970	Lakeland	Marawood
Rib Lake	Rib Lake, WI	Public	Redmen		1962	1970	Marawood	

=== Former members ===
School	Location	Affiliation	Mascot	Colors	Joined	Left	Conference Joined	Current Conference
Draper-Loretta	Draper, WI	Public	Blue and Gold		1939	1952	Closed (consolidated into Winter)	
Fifield	Fifield, WI	Public	Vikings		1939, 1946	1945, 1962	Closed (consolidated into Park Falls)	
Hawkins	Hawkins, WI	Public	Hawkeyes		1952	1967	Closed (consolidated into Ladysmith)	
Ingram-Glen Flora	Glen Flora, WI	Public	Bluejays		1955	1961	Closed (merged into Flambeau)	
Tripoli	Tripoli, WI	Public	Tornadoes		1950	1969	Closed (consolidated into Prentice)	
Westboro	Westboro, WI	Public	Trojans		1962	1967	Closed (merged into Rib Lake)	
Winter	Winter, WI	Public	Warriors		1939	1968	Lakeland	
