= Flambeau-Soo League =

Wisconsin high school athletic conference (1942-1947)

The Flambeau-Soo League is a former high school athletic conference with its membership located in northern Wisconsin. It existed from 1942 to 1947 and its member schools belonged to the Wisconsin Interscholastic Athletic Association.

== History ==
Location of Flambeau-Soo League Members (1943-1944)

The Flambeau-Soo League was formed in 1942 by five high schools located in north central Wisconsin: Fifield, Glidden, Park Falls, Phillips and Prentice. Four of the five original members were located in Price County along Wisconsin Highway 13, but the conference also counted members in Ashland and Sawyer Counties during its existence. The conference also ran concurrently with the similarly named Flambeau League and several of its members competed in both organizations. Butternut became the sixth member of the Flambeau-Soo League after joining in 1943, offseting the loss of Park Falls the next year. In 1945, Draper-Loretta and Winter became Flambeau-Soo League members, bringing the roster to its high of seven schools. Fifield and Phillips followed Park Falls out of the conference for the 1946-47 school year, and the Flambeau-Soo League competed for one more season before disbanding in 1947.

== Conference membership history ==
=== Final members ===
School	Location	Affiliation	Mascot	Colors	Joined	Left	Conference Joined	Current Conference
Butternut	Butternut, WI	Public	Midgets		1943	1947	Flambeau League	Northern Lights
Draper-Loretta	Draper, WI	Public	Blue and Gold		1945	1947	Flambeau League	Closed in 1952 (consolidated into Winter)
Glidden	Glidden, WI	Public	Vikings		1942	1947	Flambeau League	Closed in 2009 (merged into Chequamegon)
Prentice	Prentice, WI	Public	Buccaneers		1942	1947	Flambeau League	Marawood
Winter	Winter, WI	Public	Warriors		1945	1947	Flambeau League	Lakeland

=== Former members ===
School	Location	Affiliation	Mascot	Colors	Joined	Left	Conference Joined	Current Conference
Fifield	Fifield, WI	Public	Vikings		1942	1946	Flambeau League	Closed in 1962 (consolidated into Park Falls)
Park Falls	Park Falls, WI	Public	Cardinals		1942	1944	Independent	Closed in 2009 (merged into Chequamegon)
Phillips	Phillips, WI	Public	Loggers		1942	1946	Independent	Marawood
