= Soo Line League =

Wisconsin high school athletic conference (1931-1943)

The Soo Line League is a former high school athletic conference with members located in north central Wisconsin. Founded in 1931 as the Little Seven, it existed from 1931 to 1943 and its members belonged to the Wisconsin Interscholastic Athletic Association.

== History ==
Location of Original Soo Line League Members

The Soo Line League was formed in 1931 as the Little Seven Conference by seven small high schools in a five-county area (Chippewa, Lincoln, Price, Rusk and Taylor) of north central Wisconsin: Gilman, Hawkins, Lake Holcombe, Prentice, Tony, Tripoli and Westboro. Weyerhaeuser joined the conference in 1932, by which time it was referred to as the Little Eight by the local media. In 1933, the Little Eight lost two members to the Cloverbelt Conference (Gilman and Lake Holcombe) and one to the 3-C Conference (Westboro). It was around this time that the conference began to refer to itself as the Soo Line League, presumably due to the heavy presence of the Soo Line Railroad in the region. By the second half of the decade, the Soo Line League had whittled down to three schools following the exit of Weyerhaeuser to the Lakeland Conference in 1934 and Prentice to the 3-C Conference in 1935. Aside from Phillips's one-season stint in the league for the 1936-37 school year, the Soo Line League maintained a three-school membership roster of Hawkins, Tony and Tripoli. By 1940, the conference, which was now referred to as the T-Conference in most media outlets and yearbooks, had accepted Ingram-Glen Flora as members. The addition of Hannibal the following year brought membership to five schools, which is where it would remain for the last two seasons of competition. The T-Conference suspended operations in 1943 due to the gasoline rationing imposed to support American operations in World War II. Three years, later, six former Soo Line League members (Hannibal, Hawkins, Ingram-Glen Flora, Lake Holcombe, Tony and Weyerhaeuser) formed the Flambeauland Conference to resume interscholastic league competition in the region.

== Conference membership history ==
=== Final members ===
School	Location	Affiliation	Mascot	Colors	Joined	Left	Conference Joined	Current Conference
Hannibal	Hannibal, WI	Public	Unknown		1941	1943	Independent	Closed in 1956 (consolidated into Gilman)
Hawkins	Hawkins, WI	Public	Hawkeyes		1931	1943	Independent	Closed in 1967 (consolidated into Ladysmith)
Ingram-Glen Flora	Glen Flora, WI	Public	Bluejays		1940	1943	Independent	Closed in 1961 (merged into Flambeau High School)
Tony	Tony, WI	Public	Tornadoes		1931	1943	Independent	Closed in 1961 (merged into Flambeau High School)
Tripoli	Tripoli, WI	Public	Tornadoes		1931	1943	Independent	Closed in 1969 (portions merged into Prentice and Tomahawk)

=== Former members ===
School	Location	Affiliation	Mascot	Colors	Joined	Left	Conference Joined	Current Conference
Gilman	Gilman, WI	Public	Pirates		1931	1933	Cloverbelt	
Lake Holcombe	Lake Holcombe, WI	Public	Chieftains		1931	1933	Cloverbelt	Lakeland
Phillips	Phillips, WI	Public	Loggers		1936	1937	Upper Wisconsin	Marawood
Prentice	Prentice, WI	Public	Buccaneers		1931	1935	3-C	Marawood
Westboro	Westboro, WI	Public	Trojans		1931	1933	3-C	Closed in 1967 (merged into Rib Lake)
Weyerhaeuser	Weyerhaeuser, WI	Public	Wildcats		1932	1934	Lakeland	Closed in 2010 (merged into Chetek-Weyerhaeuser)
