= 2002 Wisconsin Badgers football team =

American college football season

2002 Wisconsin Badgers football

Alamo Bowl champion

Alamo Bowl, W 31–28 ^{OT} vs. Colorado
- Conference: Big Ten Conference
- Record: 8–6 (2–6 Big Ten)
- Head coach: Barry Alvarez (13th season)
- Offensive coordinator: Brian White (4th season)
- Offensive scheme: Multiple
- Defensive coordinator: Kevin Cosgrove (8th season)
- Base defense: 4–3
- MVP: Jim Leonhard
- Captains: Brooks Bollinger; Lee Evans; Al Johnson
- Home stadium: Camp Randall Stadium

2002 Big Ten Conference football standings
	Conf.			Overall
Team	W		L	W		L
No. 1 Ohio State $#+	8	–	0	14	–	0
No. 8 Iowa %+	8	–	0	11	–	2
No. 9 Michigan	6	–	2	10	–	3
No. 16 Penn State	5	–	3	9	–	4
Purdue	4	–	4	7	–	6
Illinois	4	–	4	5	–	7
Minnesota	3	–	5	8	–	5
Wisconsin	2	–	6	8	–	6
Michigan State	2	–	6	4	–	8
Northwestern	1	–	7	3	–	9
Indiana	1	–	7	3	–	9
# – BCS National Champion; $ – BCS representative as conference champion; % – BCS at-large representative; + – Conference co-champions; Rankings from AP Poll

The 2002 Wisconsin Badgers football team was an American football team that represented the University of Wisconsin–Madison as a member of the Big Ten Conference during the 2002 NCAA Division I-A football season. In their 13th year under head coach Barry Alvarez, the Badgers compiled an 8–6 record (2–6 in conference games), finished in a tie for eighth place in the Big Ten, and outscored opponents by a total of 372 to 322. The Badgers opened the season with victories in five consecutive non-conference games, but lost six of eight conference games, including No. 20 Penn State, No. 4 Ohio State, No. 9 Iowa, and No. 12 Michigan. They concluded the season with a 31–28 overtime victory over No. 14 Colorado in the Alamo Bowl. The Badgers were not ranked in the final polls.

The team's statistical leaders included: running back Anthony Davis (1,506 rushing yards, 72 points scored); quarterback Brooks Bollinger (1,551 passing yards); wide receivers Jonathan Orr (820 receiving yards) and Brand Williams (49 receptions); and defensive back Ryan Aiello (68 solo tackles, 98 total tackles). Sophomore wide receiver Lee Evans did not play due to a torn anterior cruciate ligament (ACL) sustained in the spring game.

The team played its home games at Camp Randall Stadium in Madison, Wisconsin.

== Schedule ==
Date	Time	Opponent	Rank	Site	TV	Result	Attendance	Source
August 23	7:00 p.m.	Fresno State*	No. 25	Camp Randall Stadium; Madison, WI (John Thompson Foundation Classic)	ESPN	W 23–21	75,136	
August 31	6:45 p.m.	at UNLV*		Sam Boyd Stadium; Whitney, NV	ESPN2	W 27–7	42,075	
September 7	11:00 a.m.	West Virginia*	No. 25	Camp Randall Stadium; Madison, WI	ESPN Plus	W 34–17	76,320	
September 14	11:00 a.m.	Northern Illinois*	No. 22	Camp Randall Stadium; Madison, WI	ESPN Plus	W 24–21	77,460	
September 21	11:00 a.m.	Arizona*	No. 22	Camp Randall Stadium; Madison, WI	ESPN2	W 31–10	78,582	
October 5	2:30 p.m.	No. 20 Penn State	No. 19	Camp Randall Stadium; Madison, WI	ABC	L 31–34	79,403	
October 12	11:00 p.m.	at Indiana	No. 23	Memorial Stadium; Bloomington, IN	ESPN Plus	L 29–32	31,156	
October 19	2:30 p.m.	No. 4 Ohio State^{†}		Camp Randall Stadium; Madison, WI	ABC	L 14–19	79,729	
October 26	6:00 p.m.	at Michigan State		Spartan Stadium; East Lansing, MI	ESPN2	W 42–24	74,507	
November 2	11:00 a.m.	at No. 9 Iowa		Kinnick Stadium; Iowa City, IA (rivalry)	ESPN	L 3–20	70,397	
November 9	11:00 a.m.	Illinois		Camp Randall Stadium; Madison, WI	ESPN Plus	L 20–37	78,709	
November 16	11:00 a.m.	at No. 12 Michigan		Michigan Stadium; Ann Arbor, MI	ESPN2	L 14–21	110,41	
November 23	11:00 a.m.	Minnesota		Camp Randall Stadium; Madison, WI (rivalry)	ESPN	W 49–31	78,843	
December 28	7:00 p.m.	vs. No. 14 Colorado*		Alamodome; San Antonio, TX (Alamo Bowl)	ESPN	W 31–28 ^{OT}	50,690	
*Non-conference game; ^{†}Homecoming; Rankings from AP Poll released prior to the game; All times are in Central time

}}

== Rankings ==
Ranking movements Legend: ██ Increase in ranking ██ Decrease in ranking — = Not ranked RV = Received votes
	Week																	
Poll	Pre	1	2	3	4	5	6	7	8	9	10	11	12	13	14	15	16	Final
AP	25	RV	25	22	22	21	19	23	—	—	—	—	—	—	—	—	—	RV
Coaches Poll	23	25	21	18	17	16	15	22	—	—	—	—	—	—	—	—	—	RV
BCS	Not released									—	—	—	—	—	—	—	—	Not released

== Game summaries ==
=== Fresno State ===
Fresno State vs Wisconsin – Game summary

Quarter	1	2	3	4	Total
Bulldogs	7	0	7	7	21
No. 25 Badgers	0	10	7	6	23

at Camp Randall Stadium

- Date: August 23, 2002
- Game time: 7:00 p.m.
- Game weather: 72 °F (22 °C); Cloudy; Wind at N 6 MPH
- Game attendance: 75,136
- Referee: J. Strochertz
- TV: ESPN

Game information

First quarter

- FS – Bernard Berrian 22-yard pass from Jeff Grady (Asen Asparuhov kick), 4:29. Fresno State 7–0. Drive: 6 plays, 69 yards, 2:38.

Second quarter

- WIS – Matt Bernstein 1-yard TD run (Mike Allen kick), 14:06. Tie 7–7. Drive: 1 plays, 1 yard, 0:03.
- WIS – Mike Allen 27-yard field goal, 4:02. Wisconsin 10–7. Drive: 10 plays, 69 yards, 5:06.

Third quarter

- FS – Adam Jennings 8-yard pass from Jeff Grady (Asen Asparuhov kick), 11:46. Fresno State 14–10. Drive: 5 plays, 15 yards, 1:53.
- WIS – Matt Bernstein 3-yard TD run (Mike Allen kick), 6:08. Wisconsin 17–14. Drive: 12 plays, 65 yards, 5:34.

Fourth quarter

- WIS – Mike Allen 35-yard field goal, 11:50. Wisconsin 20–14. Drive: 8 plays, 50 yards, 3:30.
- FS – Alec Greco 23-yard pass from Jeff Grady (Asen Asparuhov kick), 9:01. Fresno State 21–20. Drive: 2 plays, 25 yards, 0:36.
- WIS – Mike Allen 34-yard field goal, 2:05. Wisconsin 23–21. Drive: 13 plays, 64 yards, 6:50.

Top passers

- FS – Jeff Grady – 21/42, 262 yards, 3 TD, 2 INT
- WIS – Brooks Bollinger – 11/25, 160 yards

Top rushers

- FS – Matt Rivera – 8 rushes, 21 yards
- WIS – Anthony Davis – 36 rushes, 184 yards

Top receivers

- FS – Marque Davis – 6 receptions, 69 yards
- WIS – Brandon Williams – 3 receptions, 62 yards

Top defenders

- FS – Sam Williams – 11 tackles, fumble recovery, pass breakup
- WIS – Jeff Mack – 9 tackles, TFL, 2 pass breakups

=== UNLV ===
Wisconsin vs UNLV – Game summary

Quarter	1	2	3	4	Total
Badgers	0	24	0	3	27
Rebels	0	7	0	0	7

at Sam Boyd Stadium

- Date: August 31, 2002
- Game time: 6:45 p.m.
- Game weather: 97 °F (36 °C); Cloudy; Wind at SW 11 MPH
- Game attendance: 42,075
- Referee: Clair Gausman
- TV: ESPN2

Game information

First quarter

No scoring

Second quarter

- WIS – Jonathan Orr 37-yard pass from Brooks Bollinger (Mike Allen kick), 11:45. Wisconsin 7–0. Drive: 1 play, 37 yards, 0:07.
- WIS – Bob Docherty 8-yard pass from Brooks Bollinger (Mike Allen kick), 10:16. Wisconsin 14–0. Drive: 2 plays, 9 yards, 0:43.
- WIS – Mike Allen 43-yard field goal, 6:10. Wisconsin 17–0. Drive: 8 plays, 55 yards, 2:48.
- WIS – Dwayne Smith 2-yard TD run (Mike Allen kick), 2:19. Wisconsin 24–0. Drive: 5 plays, 55 yards, 1:16.
- NLV – Joe Haro 15-yard TD run (Dillon Pieffer kick), 0:56. Wisconsin 24–7. Drive: 6 plays, 83 yards, 1:23.

Third quarter

No scoring

Fourth quarter

- WIS – Scott Campbell 42-yard field goal, 7:27. Wisconsin 27–7. Drive: 10 plays, 47 yards, 4:42.

Top passers

- NLV – Jason Thomas – 12/26, 138 yards, 2 INT
- WIS – Brooks Bollinger – 12/24, 157 yards, 2 TD

Top rushers

- NLV – Jason Thomas – 10 rushes, 83 yards
- WIS – Anthony Davis – 20 rushes, 81 yards

Top receivers

- NLV – Michael Johnson – 4 receptions, 45 yards
- WIS – Jonathan Orr – 7 receptions, 150 yards, TD

Top defenders

- NLV – Tyrone Tucker – 11 tackles
- WIS – Jim Leonhard – 7 tackles, INT, 2 pass breakups

=== West Virginia ===
West Virginia vs Wisconsin – Game summary

Quarter	1	2	3	4	Total
Mountaineers	0	3	7	7	17
No. 25 Badgers	7	27	0	0	34

at Camp Randall Stadium

- Date: September 7, 2002
- Game time: 11:00 a.m.
- Game weather: 76 °F (24 °C); Clear; Wind at SW 7 MPH
- Game attendance: 76,320
- Referee: Gene Steratore
- TV: ESPN+

Game information

First quarter

- WIS – Jonathan Orr 19-yard pass from Brooks Bollinger (Scott Campbell kick), 6:54. Wisconsin 7–0. Drive: 4 plays, 57 yards, 2:03.

Second quarter

- WVU – Todd James 34-yard field goal, 14:10. Wisconsin 7–3. Drive: 10 plays, 63 yards, 3:22.
- WIS – Dwayne Smith 4-yard TD run (Scott Campbell kick), 10:09. Wisconsin 14–3. Drive: 8 plays, 72 yards, 3:50.
- WIS – Anthony Davis 6-yard TD run (Scott Campbell kick), 7:10. Wisconsin 21–3. Drive: 7 plays, 60 yards, 1:47.
- WIS – Jonathan Orr 43-yard pass from Brooks Bollinger (Jim Sorgi rush failed), 3:34. Wisconsin 27–3. Drive: 3 plays, 61 yards, 0:57.
- WIS – Matt Bernstein 2-yard TD run (Scott Campbell kick), 1:16. Wisconsin 34–3. Drive: 5 plays, 79 yards, 1:21.

Third quarter

- WVU – Avon Cobourne 6-yard TD run (Todd James kick), 11:57. Wisconsin 34–10. Drive: 9 plays, 80 yards, 2:57.

Fourth quarter

- WVU – Rasheed Marshall 1-yard TD run (Todd James kick), 9:18. Wisconsin 34–17. Drive: 9 plays, 71 yards, 2:43.

Top passers

- WVU – Rasheed Marshall – 17/36, 219 yards
- WIS – Brooks Bollinger – 14/20, 218 yards, 2 TD

Top rushers

- WVU – Avon Cobourne – 18 rushes, 79 yards, TD
- WIS – Anthony Davis – 19 rushes, 75 yards, TD

Top receivers

- WVU – Miquelle Henderson – 5 receptions, 106 yards
- WIS – Jonathan Orr – 5 receptions, 94 yards, 2 TD

Top defenders

- WVU – Grant Wiley – 7 tackles
- WIS – Jim Leonhard – 7 tackles, 2 pass breakups

=== Northern Illinois ===
Northern Illinois vs Wisconsin – Game summary

Quarter	1	2	3	4	Total
Huskies	3	3	3	12	21
No. 22 Badgers	0	10	7	7	24

at Camp Randall Stadium

- Date: September 14, 2002
- Game time: 11:00 a.m.
- Game weather: 72 °F (22 °C); Cloudy; Wind at Var. 5 MPH
- Game attendance: 77,460
- Referee: S. Pamon
- TV: ESPN+

Game information

First quarter

- NIU – Steve Azar 34-yard field goal, 6:33. Northern Illinois 3–0. Drive: 14 plays, 63 yards, 5:21.

Second quarter

- WIS – Brooks Bollinger 1-yard TD run (Scott Campbell kick), 3:06. Wisconsin 7–3. Drive: 9 plays, 58 yards, 3:48.
- NIU – Steve Azar 37-yard field goal, 0:33. Wisconsin 7–6. Drive: 9 plays, 59 yards, 2:26.
- WIS – Scott Campbell 29-yard field goal, 0:00. Wisconsin 10–6. Drive: 4 plays, 46 yards, 0:28.

Third quarter

- NIU – Steve Azar 35-yard field goal, 11:31. Wisconsin 10–9. Drive: 11 plays, 63 yards, 3:24.
- WIS – Anthony Davis 9-yard TD run (Scott Campbell kick), 5:56. Wisconsin 17–9. Drive: 3 plays, 18 yards, 1:26.

Fourth quarter

- NIU – Michael Turner 3-yard TD run (Josh Haldi pass failed), 14:56. Wisconsin 17–15. Drive: 6 plays, 79 yards, 1:30.
- NIU – Michael Turner 1-yard TD run (Josh Haldi pass failed), 5:55. Northern Illinois 21–17. Drive: 7 plays, 90 yards, 2:51.
- WIS – Brooks Bollinger 2-yard TD run (Scott Campbell kick), 1:21. Wisconsin 24–21. Drive: 6 plays, 50 yards, 0:52.

Top passers

- NIU – Josh Haldi – 18/33, 273 yards, 2 INT
- WIS – Brooks Bollinger – 15/23, 207 yards, INT

Top rushers

- NIU – Michael Turner – 34 rushes, 160 yards, 2 TD
- WIS – Anthony Davis – 14 rushes, 49 yards, TD

Top receivers

- NIU – Sam Hurd – 8 receptions, 161 yards
- WIS – David Braun – 4 receptions, 56 yards

Top defenders

- NIU – Larry Williams – 10 tackles, 3 TFL, 3 sacks, 2 FF
- WIS – Jim Leonhard – 9 tackles, INT, pass breakup

=== Arizona ===
Arizona vs Wisconsin – Game summary

Quarter	1	2	3	4	Total
Wildcats	0	0	7	3	10
No. 22 Badgers	0	24	7	0	31

at Camp Randall Stadium

- Date: September 21, 2002
- Game time: 11:00 a.m.
- Game weather: 63 °F (17 °C); Sunny and Clear; Wind at NW 5-7 MPH
- Game attendance: 78,582
- Referee: D. Witvoet
- TV: ESPN2

Game information

First quarter

No scoring

Second quarter

- WIS – Anthony Davis 6-yard TD run (Scott Campbell kick), 14:53. Wisconsin 7–0. Drive: 7 plays, 74 yards, 2:49.
- WIS – Anthony Davis 3-yard TD run (Scott Campbell kick), 13:45. Wisconsin 14–0. Drive: 1 plays, 3 yards, 0:04.
- WIS – Jonathan Orr 17-yard pass from Brooks Bollinger (Scott Campbell kick), 4:03. Wisconsin 21–0. Drive: 10 plays, 96 yards, 4:50.
- WIS – Scott Campbell 32-yard field goal, 0:12. Wisconsin 24–0. Drive: 8 plays, 21 yards, 2:39.

Third quarter

- ARZ – Clarence Farmer 70-yard TD run (Sean Keel kick), 10:15. Wisconsin 24–7. Drive: 7 plays, 94 yards, 2:16.
- WIS – Brooks Bollinger 1-yard TD run (Scott Campbell kick), 1:39. Wisconsin 31–7. Drive: 15 plays, 80 yards, 8:51.

Fourth quarter

- ARZ – Sean Keel 27-yard field goal, 8:12. Wisconsin 31–10. Drive: 8 plays, 11 yards, 2:29.

Top passers

- ARZ – Jason Johnson – 13/27, 129 yards, INT
- WIS – Brooks Bollinger – 13/19, 127 yards, TD

Top rushers

- ARZ – Clarence Farmer – 20 rushes, 131 yards, TD
- WIS – Anthony Davis – 16 rushes, 110 yards, 2 TD

Top receivers

- ARZ – Bobby Wade – 7 receptions, 85 yards
- WIS – Jonathan Orr – 7 receptions, 90 yards, TD

Top defenders

- ARZ – Lance Briggs – 15 tackles, 2 TFL
- WIS – Jeff Mack – 13 tackles, pass breakup, QB hurry

=== Penn State ===
Penn State vs Wisconsin – Game summary

Quarter	1	2	3	4	Total
No. 20 Nittany Lions	10	11	7	6	34
No. 19 Badgers	0	14	6	11	31

at Camp Randall Stadium

- Date: October 5, 2002
- Game time: 2:30 p.m.
- Game weather: 55 °F (13 °C); Clear; Wind at W 6 MPH
- Game attendance: 79,403
- Referee: J. Lapetoma
- TV: ABC

Game information

First quarter

- PSU – Robbie Gould 33-yard field goal, 11:06. Penn State 3–0. Drive: 11 plays, 65 yards, 3:54.
- PSU – Zack Mills 1-yard TD run (Robbie Gould kick), 1:47. Penn State 10–0. Drive: 10 plays, 80 yards, 4:47.

Second quarter

- WIS – Brooks Bollinger 5-yard TD run (Scott Campbell kick), 12:24. Penn State 10–7. Drive: 9 plays, 80 yards, 4:16.
- PSU – Robbie Gould 42-yard field goal, 8:25. Penn State 13–7. Drive: 12 plays, 56 yards, 3:50.
- WIS – B. J. Tucker 65-yard interception return (Scott Campbell kick), 4:33. Wisconsin 14–13.
- PSU – Larry Johnson 24-yard TD run (Larry Johnson pass), 3:12. Penn State 21–14. Drive: 4 plays, 74 yards, 1:12.

Third quarter

- PSU – Sean McHugh 1-yard TD run (Robbie Gould kick), 8:56. Penn State 28–14. Drive: 8 plays, 56 yards, 3:30.
- WIS – Brandon Williams 7-yard pass from Brooks Bollinger (Scott Campbell kick failed), 2:23. Penn State 28–20. Drive: 13 plays, 80 yards, 6:28.

Fourth quarter

- WIS – Mike Allen 48-yard field goal, 13:05. Penn State 28–23. Drive: 8 plays, 32 yards, 2:27.
- PSU – Robbie Gould 51-yard field goal, 7:36. Penn State 31–23. Drive: 7 plays, 40 yards, 2:50.
- PSU – Robbie Gould 40-yard field goal, 2:55. Penn State 34–23. Drive: 7 plays, 20 yards, 2:37.
- WIS – Jonathan Orr 28-yard pass from Brooks Bollinger (Dewayne Smith run), 1:17. Penn State 34–31. Drive: 7 plays, 65 yards, 1:31.

Top passers

- PSU – Zack Mills – 21/37, 287 yards, INT
- WIS – Brooks Bollinger – 15/25, 217 yards, 2 TD, INT

Top rushers

- PSU – Larry Johnson – 14 rushes, 111 yards, TD
- WIS – Anthony Davis – 11 rushes, 46 yards

Top receivers

- PSU – Bryant Johnson – 4 receptions, 81 yards
- WIS – Jonathan Orr – 4 receptions, 62 yards, TD

Top defenders

- PSU – Jimmy Kennedy – 6 tackles, 5 TFL, 4 sacks
- WIS – Jim Leonhard – 10 tackles, pass breakup

=== Indiana ===
Wisconsin vs Indiana – Game summary

Quarter	1	2	3	4	Total
No. 23 Badgers	6	10	13	0	29
Hoosiers	3	7	7	15	32

at Memorial Stadium

- Date: October 12, 2002
- Game time: 11:00 a.m.
- Game weather: 64 °F (18 °C); Cloudy; Wind at N/A
- Game attendance: 31,156
- Referee: Steve Newman
- TV: ESPN+

Game information

First quarter

- WIS – Mike Allen 34-yard field goal, 13:19. Wisconsin 3–0.
- IND – Bryan Robertson 32-yard field goal, 4:45. Tie 3–3.
- WIS – Mike Allen 26-yard field goal, 0:27. Wisconsin 6–3.

Second quarter

- IND – Brian Lewis 4-yard pass from Gibran Hamdan (Bryan Robertson kick), 11:49. Indiana 10–6.
- WIS – Mike Allen 44-yard field goal, 4:14. Indiana 10–9.
- WIS – Jonathan Orr 23-yard pass from Brooks Bollinger (Mike Allen kick), 1:24. Wisconsin 16–10.

Third quarter

- WIS – Anthony Davis 8-yard TD run (Brooks Bollinger run failed), 10:06. Wisconsin 22–10.
- WIS – Dewayne Smith 1-yard TD run (Mike Allen kick), 9:34. Wisconsin 29–10.''
- IND – Courtney Roby 31-yard pass from Gibran Hamdan (Bryan Robertson kick), 11:49. Wisconsin 29–17.

Fourth quarter

- IND – Aaron Halterman 4-yard pass from Gibran Hamdan (Bryan Robertson kick), 9:21. Wisconsin 29–24.
- IND – Glenn Johnson 20-yard pass from Gibran Hamdan (Glenn Johnson pass), 2:16. Indiana 32–29.

Top passers

- IND – Gibran Hamdan – 24/36, 310 yards, 4 TD, INT
- WIS – Brooks Bollinger – 11/23, 113 yards, TD, INT

Top rushers

- IND – Brian Lewis – 20 rushes, 92 yards, TD
- WIS – Anthony Davis – 18 rushes, 108 yards, TD

Top receivers

- IND – Courtney Roby – 6 receptions, 94 yards, TD
- WIS – Brandon Williams – 6 receptions, 42 yards

Top defenders

- IND – John Kerr – 13 tackles, TFL, sack
- WIS – B. J. Tucker – 13 tackles

=== Ohio State ===
Ohio State vs Wisconsin – Game summary

Quarter	1	2	3	4	Total
No. 4 Buckeyes	10	3	0	6	19
Badgers	7	7	0	0	14

at Camp Randall Stadium

- Date: October 19, 2002
- Game time: 2:30 p.m.
- Game weather: 42 °F (6 °C); Cloudy; Wind at NE 10
- Game attendance: 79,729
- Referee: D. Honig
- TV: ABC

Game information

First quarter

- OSU – Michael Jenkins 47-yard pass from Craig Krenzel (Mike Nugent kick), 13:30. Ohio State 7–0. Drive: 3 plays, 75 yards, 1:30.
- WIS – Anthony Davis 41-yard TD run (Mike Allen kick), 5:49. Tie 7–7. Drive: 3 plays, 66 yards, 0:51.
- OSU – Mike Nugent 27-yard field goal, 2:48. Ohio State 10–7. Drive: 8 plays, 70 yards, 2:56.

Second quarter

- OSU – Mike Nugent 25-yard field goal, 13:14. Ohio State 13–7. Drive: 9 plays, 24 yards, 3:41.
- WIS – Jonathan Orr 42-yard pass from Jim Sorgi (Mike Allen kick), 1:55. Wisconsin 14–13. Drive: 7 plays, 79 yards, 2:15.

Third quarter

No scoring

Fourth quarter

- OSU – Ben Hartsock 3-yard pass from Craig Krenzel (Craig Krenzel pass failed), 9:59. Ohio State 19–14. Drive: 9 plays, 88 yards, 4:44.

Top passers

- OSU – Craig Krenzel – 12/19, 204 yards, 2 TD
- WIS – Jim Sorgi – 7/15, 137 yards, TD, INT

Top rushers

- OSU – Maurice Clarett – 30 rushes, 133 yards
- WIS – Anthony Davis – 25 rushes, 144 yards, TD

Top receivers

- OSU – Michael Jenkins – 5 receptions, 114 yards, TD
- WIS – Jonathan Orr – 4 receptions, 107 yards, TD

Top defenders

- OSU – Mike Doss – 14 tackles, 0.5 TFL, fumble recovery
- WIS – Brode Williams – 11 tackles, TFL, sack

=== Michigan State ===
Wisconsin vs Michigan State – Game summary

Quarter	1	2	3	4	Total
Badgers	21	7	7	7	42
Spartans	0	3	14	7	24

at Spartan Stadium

- Date: October 26, 2002
- Game time: 6:00 p.m.
- Game weather: 44 °F (7 °C); Mostly Cloudy; Wind at W 5
- Game attendance: 74,507
- Referee: Dennis Lipski
- TV: ESPN2

Game information

First quarter

- WIS – Brooks Bollinger 1-yard TD run (Mike Allen kick), 9:20. Wisconsin 7–0. Drive: 5 plays, 68 yards, 1:44.
- WIS – Brooks Bollinger 7-yard TD run (Mike Allen kick), 5:47. Wisconsin 14–0. Drive: 6 plays, 46 yards, 2:27.
- WIS – Mark Bell 3-yard pass from Brooks Bollinger (Mike Allen kick), 0:11. Wisconsin 21–0. Drive: 9 plays, 80 yards, 2:50.

Second quarter

- MSU – Dave Rayner 36-yard field goal, 10:35. Wisconsin 21–3. Drive: 11 plays, 51 yards, 4:25.
- WIS – Brandon Williams 9-yard pass from Brooks Bollinger (Mike Allen kick), 0:05. Wisconsin 28–3. Drive: 6 plays, 62 yards, 0:32.

Third quarter

- MSU – B.J. Lovett 7-yard pass from Damon Dowdell (Dave Raymer kick), 9:13. Wisconsin 28–10. Drive: 13 plays, 84 yards, 5:38.
- WIS – Dewayne Smith 33-yard TD run (Mike Allen kick), 7:10. Wisconsin 35–10. Drive: 5 plays, 65 yards, 1:57.
- MSU – Charles Rogers 26-yard pass from Damon Dowdell (Dave Raymer kick), 0:00. Wisconsin 35–17. Drive: 2 plays, 60 yards, 0:12.

Fourth quarter

- WIS – Jonathan Orr 23-yard pass from Brooks Bollinger (Mike Allen kick), 7:49. Wisconsin 42–17. Drive: 12 plays, 79 yards, 7:01.
- MSU – Charles Rogers 44-yard pass from Aaron Alexander (Dave Raymer kick), 5:23. Wisconsin 42–24. Drive: 7 plays, 45 yards, 2:13.

Top passers

- MSU – Craig Krenzel – 12/19, 204 yards, 2 TD
- WIS – Jim Sorgi – 7/15, 137 yards, TD, INT

Top rushers

- MSU – Maurice Clarett – 30 rushes, 133 yards
- WIS – Anthony Davis – 25 rushes, 144 yards, TD

Top receivers

- MSU – Michael Jenkins – 5 receptions, 114 yards, TD
- WIS – Jonathan Orr – 4 receptions, 107 yards, TD

Top defenders

- MSU – Mike Doss – 14 tackles, 0.5 TFL, fumble recovery
- WIS – Brode Williams – 11 tackles, TFL, sack

=== Iowa ===
Wisconsin vs Iowa – Game summary

Quarter	1	2	3	4	Total
Badgers	0	3	0	0	3
No. 9 Hawkeyes	0	10	10	0	20

at Kinnick Stadium

- Date: November 2, 2002
- Game time: 11:00 a.m.
- Game weather: 37 °F (3 °C); Mostly Sunny; Wind at W 10
- Game attendance: 70,397
- Referee: S. Pamon
- TV: ESPN

Game information

First quarter

No scoring

Second quarter

- IOW – Nate Kaeding 32-yard field goal, 10:45. Iowa 3–0. Drive: 10 plays, 33 yards, 4:01.
- WIS – Mike Allen 26-yard field goal, 4:24. Tie 3–3. Drive: 11 plays, 72 yards, 4:24.
- IOW – Maurice Brown 21-yard pass from Brad Banks (Nate Kaeding kick), 1:03. Iowa 10–3. Drive: 5 plays, 45 yards, 1:11.

Third quarter

- IOW – Nate Kaeding 30-yard field goal, 10:05. Iowa 13–3. Drive: 6 plays, 57 yards, 2:29.
- IOW – Dallas Clark 23-yard pass from Brad Banks (Nate Kaeding kick), 6:25. Iowa 20–3. Drive: 5 plays, 55 yards, 1:31.

Fourth quarter

No scoring

Top passers

- IOW – Brad Banks – 17/30, 275 yards, 2 TD
- WIS – Jim Sorgi – 8/17, 84 yards, INT

Top rushers

- IOW – Jermelle Lewis – 25 rushes, 81 yards
- WIS – Anthony Davis – 16 rushes, 34 yards

Top receivers

- IOW – Maurice Brown – 6 receptions, 107 yards, TD
- WIS – Jonathan Orr – 6 receptions, 83 yards

Top defenders

- IOW – Derek Pagel – 8 tackles, INT
- WIS – Alex Lewis – 13 tackles, 4 TFL, sack, 2 forced fumbles, pass breakup, QB hurry

=== Illinois ===
Illinois vs Wisconsin – Game summary

Quarter	1	2	3	4	Total
Fighting Illini	10	14	3	10	37
Badgers	3	10	7	0	20

at Camp Randall Stadium

- Date: November 9, 2002
- Game time: 11:00 a.m.
- Game weather: 37 °F (3 °C); Mostly Sunny; Wind at W 10
- Game attendance: 78,709
- Referee: S. Pamon
- TV: ESPN+

Game information

First quarter

- ILL – John Gockman 46-yard field goal, 12:01. Illinois 3–0. Drive: 5 plays, 44 yards, 1:19.
- WIS – Mike Allen 20-yard field goal, 5:13. Tie 3–3. Drive: 12 plays, 77 yards, 4:48.
- ILL – Greg Lewis 36-yard pass from Jon Beutjer (Peter Christofilakos kick), 2:59. Illinois 10–3. Drive: 5 plays, 61 yards, 2:05.

Second quarter

- ILL – Greg Lewis 7-yard pass from Jon Beutjer (Peter Christofilakos kick), 14:11. Illinois 17–3. Drive: 5 plays, 36 yards, 1:14.
- WIS – Dewayne Smith 6-yard TD run (Mike Allen kick), 11:07. Illinois 17–10. Drive: 1 plays, 6 yards, 0:05.
- WIS – Mike Allen 44-yard field goal, 7:31. Illinois 17–13. Drive: 7 plays, 17 yards, 2:24.
- ILL – Walter Young 22-yard pass from Jon Beutjer (Peter Christofilakos kick), 0:28. Illinois 24–13. Drive: 4 plays, 56 yards, 1:08.

Third quarter

- WIS – Dewayne Smith 1-yard TD run (Mike Allen kick), 9:26. Illinois 24–20. Drive: 4 plays, 10 yards, 2:13.
- ILL – Peter Christofilakos 29-yard field goal, 3:07. Illinois 27–20. Drive: 13 plays, 68 yards, 6:13.

Fourth quarter

- ILL – Jason Davis 12-yard pass from Jon Beutjer (Peter Christofilakos kick), 11:34. Illinois 34–20. Drive: 9 plays, 44 yards, 3:54.
- ILL – John Gockman 46-yard field goal, 6:37. Illinois 37–20. Drive: 5 plays, 25 yards, 1:33.

Top passers

- ILL – Jon Beutjer – 22/34, 319 yards, 4 TD, 3 INT
- WIS – Jim Sorgi – 13/23, 162 yards

Top rushers

- ILL – Antoineo Harris – 40 rushes, 158 yards
- WIS – Dewayne Smith – 28 rushes, 122 yards, 2 TD

Top receivers

- ILL – Walter Young – 9 receptions, 114 yards, TD
- WIS – Brandon Williams – 7 receptions, 83 yards

Top defenders

- ILL – Derrick Strong – 9 tackles, 3 TFL, 2 sacks, forced fumble, QB hurry
- WIS – Alex Lewis – 13 tackles, fumble recovery, QB hurry

=== Michigan ===
Wisconsin vs Michigan – Game summary

Quarter	1	2	3	4	Total
Badgers	7	7	0	0	14
No. 12 Wolverines	14	0	7	0	21

at Michigan Stadium

- Date: November 16, 2002
- Game time: 11:00 a.m.
- Game weather: 35 °F (2 °C); Mostly cloudy; Wind at ENE 15
- Game attendance: 110,412
- Referee: S. Newman
- TV: ESPN

Game information

First quarter

- MIC – B. J. Askew 27-yard TD run (Adam Finley kick), 12:14. Michigan 7–0. Drive: 5 plays, 75 yards, 2:46.
- MIC – Chris Perry 11-yard TD run (Adam Finley kick), 10:41. Michigan 14–0. Drive: 3 plays, 19 yards, 1:17.
- WIS – Jim Leonhard 39-yard punt return (Mike Allen kick), 1:27. Michigan 14–7

Second quarter

- WIS – Anthony Davis 2-yard TD run (Mike Allen kick), 4:31. Tie 14–14. Drive: 6 plays, 54 yards, 3:03.

Third quarter

- MIC – Braylon Edwards 8-yard pass from John Navarre (Adam Finley kick), 2:15. Michigan 21–14. Drive: 16 plays, 78 yards, 8:43.

Fourth quarter

No scoring

Top passers

- MIC – John Navarre – 19/28, 136 yards, TD, 2 INT
- WIS – Brooks Bollinger – 7/20, 60 yards

Top rushers

- MIC – Chris Perry – 27 rushes, 175 yards, TD
- WIS – Anthony Davis – 26 rushes, 154 yards, TD

Top receivers

- MIC – Bennie Joppru – 7 receptions, 45 yards
- WIS – Brandon Williams – 3 receptions, 20 yards

Top defenders

- MIC – Victor Hobson – 9 tackles, TFL, sack, fumble recovery
- WIS – Ryan Aiello – 12 tackles

=== Minnesota ===
Minnesota vs Wisconsin – Game summary

Quarter	1	2	3	4	Total
Golden Gophers	3	11	10	7	31
Badgers	7	14	7	21	49

at Camp Randall Stadium

- Date: November 23, 2002
- Game time: 11:00 a.m.
- Game weather: 39 °F (4 °C); Partly cloudy; Wind at W 8
- Game attendance: 78,843
- Referee: D. Honig
- TV: ESPN

Game information

First quarter

- MIN – Dan Nystrom 39-yard field goal, 7:32. Minnesota 3–0. Drive: 4 plays, 8 yards, 1:33.
- WIS – Anthony Davis 4-yard TD run (Mike Allen kick), 3:18. Wisconsin 7–3. Drive: 8 plays, 66 yards, 4:03.

Second quarter

- MIN – Dan Nystrom 25-yard field goal, 14:49. Wisconsin 7–6. Drive: 9 plays, 57 yards, 3:23.
- WIS – Darrin Charles 12-yard pass from Brooks Bollinger (Mike Allen kick), 9:27. Wisconsin 14–6. Drive: 12 plays, 74 yards, 5:15.
- MIN – Terry Jackson II 1-yard TD run (Ben Utecht catch), 3:50. Tie 14–14. Drive: 12 plays, 87 yards, 5:26.
- WIS – Anthony Davis 1-yard TD run (Mike Allen kick), 0:03. Wisconsin 21–14. Drive: 12 plays, 58 yards, 3:38.

Third quarter

- MIN – Terry Jackson II 7-yard TD run (Dan Nystrom kick), 11:29. Tie 21–21. Drive: 9 plays, 79 yards, 3:22.
- MIN – Dan Nystrom 29-yard field goal, 8:13. Minnesota 24–21. Drive: 7 plays, 13 yards, 1:42.
- WIS – Anthony Davis 25-yard TD run (Mike Allen kick), 0:45. Wisconsin 28–24. Drive: 3 plays, 38 yards, 0:50.

Fourth quarter

- MIN – Thomas Tapeh 2-yard pass from Asad Abdul-Khaliq (Dan Nystrom kick), 12:30. Minnesota 31–28. Drive: 9 plays, 80 yards, 3:09.
- WIS – Brooks Bollinger 1-yard TD run (Mike Allen kick), 10:21. Wisconsin 35–31. Drive: 7 plays, 75 yards, 1:58.
- WIS – Anthony Davis 2-yard TD run (Mike Allen kick), 2:51. Wisconsin 42–31. Drive: 11 plays, 75 yards, 5:35.
- WIS – Anthony Davis 71-yard TD run (Mike Allen kick), 1:26. Wisconsin 49–31. Drive: 3 plays, 80 yards, 1:01.

Top passers

- MIN – Asad Abdul-Khaliq – 15/33, 282 yards, TD, 2 INT
- WIS – Brooks Bollinger – 6/12, 134 yards, TD

Top rushers

- MIN – Terry Jackson II – 22 rushes, 87 yards, 2 TD
- WIS – Anthony Davis – 45 rushes, 301 yards, 5 TD

Top receivers

- MIN – Aaron Hosack – 4 receptions, 90 yards
- WIS – Brandon Williams – 2 receptions, 49 yards

Top defenders

- MIN – Eli Ward – 22 tackles, TFL
- WIS – LaMarr Watkins – 8 tackles, 2.5 TFL

=== Colorado ===
Colorado vs Wisconsin – Game summary

Quarter	1	2	3	4	OT	Total
No. 14 Buffaloes	14	0	14	0	0	28
Badgers	7	14	0	7	3	31

at Alamodome

- Date: December 28, 2002
- Game time: 7:00 p.m.
- Game weather: Indoors
- Game attendance: 50,690
- Referee: Terry Brown
- TV: ESPN

Game information

First quarter

- COL – Donald Strickland 91-yard interception return (Pat Brougham kick), 11:07. Colorado 7–0.
- WIS – Anthony Davis 4-yard TD run (Mike Allen kick), 4:54. Tie 7–7. Drive: 3 plays, 19 yards, 1:08.
- COL – D. J. Hackett 10-yard pass from Robert Hodge (Pat Brougham kick), 0:00. Colorado 14–7. Drive: 11 plays, 83 yards, 4:54.

Second quarter

- WIS – Brandon Williams 10-yard pass from Brooks Bollinger (Mike Allen kick), 5:19. Tie 14–14. Drive: 6 plays, 45 yards, 3:04.
- WIS – Darrin Charles 7-yard pass from Brooks Bollinger (Mike Allen kick), 0:32. Wisconsin 21–14. Drive: 7 plays, 29 yards, 2:12.

Third quarter

- COL – Chris Brown 4-yard TD run (Pat Brougham kick), 7:37. Tie 21–21. Drive: 7 plays, 25 yards, 3:48.
- COL – D. J. Hackett 11-yard pass from Zac Colvin (Pat Brougham kick), 5:58. Colorado 28–21. Drive: 3 plays, 17 yards, 1:20.

Fourth quarter

- WIS – Brooks Bollinger 1-yard TD run (Mike Allen kick), 0:51. Tie 28–28. Drive: 10 plays, 80 yards, 1:34.

Overtime

- WIS – Mike Allen 37-yard field goal, 15:00. Wisconsin 31–28. Drive: 5 plays, 4 yards, 0:42.

Top passers

- COL – Robert Hodge – 6/13, 62 yards, TD, 3 INT
- WIS – Brooks Bollinger – 12/24, 163 yards, 2 TD, INT

Top rushers

- COL – Chris Brown – 28 rushes, 97 yards, TD
- WIS – Anthony Davis – 25 rushes, 99 yards, TD

Top receivers

- COL – D. J. Hackett – 3 receptions, 30 yards, 2 TD
- WIS – Brandon Williams – 5 receptions, 83 yards, TD

Top defenders

- COL – Medford Moorer – 13 tackles, 0.5 TFL, pass breakup
- WIS – Jeff Mack – 9 tackles, 3 TFL

== Personnel ==
=== Roster ===
2002 Wisconsin Badgers football team roster
Players
Coaches
Offense

Pos.	#	Name	Class
G	58	Kalvin Barrett	So
TE	88	Mark Bell	Jr
FB	45	Matt Bernstein	Fr
FB	39	Erik Bickerstaff	Sr
QB	5	Brooks Bollinger (C)	Sr
WR	84	David Braun	Sr
WR	1	Byron Brown	Jr
G	67	Dan Buenning	So
WR	87	Darrin Charles	So
G	50	Jonathan Clinkscale	So
QB	11	Owen Daniels	Fr
RB	28	Anthony Davis	So
OT	75	Morgan Davis	So
TE	81	Bob Docherty	So
WR	3	Lee Evans (injured) (C)	Sr
C	72	Al Johnson (C)	Sr
OT	64	Ben Johnson	Sr
OT	56	Jason Jowers	Sr
OL	79	Mike Kleber	Fr
FB	37	Russ Kuhns	Sr
OT	61	Mike Lorenz	So
TE	36	Matt Mialik	Jr
TE	38	Jason Pociask	So
WR	9	Jonathan Orr	Fr
TE	85	Tony Paciotti	So
RB	20	Jerrone Pettus	So
TE	38	Jason Pociask	Fr
C, G	53	Donovan Raiola	Fr
QB	16	Matt Schabert	So
RB	30	Dwayne Smith	Fr
QB	19	Jim Sorgi	Jr
TE	82	Rob Tucker	Jr
G	66	Andy Ulrich	So
RB	24	LaMarr Watkins	Fr
WR	6	Brandon White	Fr
WR	25	Brandon Williams	Fr
OT	78	Jake Wood	Fr

Defense

Pos.	#	Name	Class
S	7	Ryan Aiello	Jr
CB	6	Brett Bell	So
S	42	Robert Brooks	So
LB	10	Chris Catalano	So
DT	97	Nick Cochart	Jr
CB	4	Chuckie Cowans	So
S	24	Patrick Ellestad	So
LB	4	Elliot Goode	Fr
DT	77	Anttaj Hawthorne	So
S	22	Nate Howard	Jr
DE	90	Erasmus James	Jr
DT	74	Jason Jefferson	So
DE	98	Darius Jones	So
S	18	Jim Leonhard	So
LB	12	Alex Lewis	Jr
DE	91	Traison Lewis	So
LB	46	Jeff Mack	Jr
LB	30	Kyle McCorison	Jr
CB	21	Levonne Rowan	Fr
S	14	Dontez Sanders	Fr
DB	15	Ryan Simmons	Sr
DE	99	Jake Sprague	Sr
CB	2	Scott Starks	So
LB	34	Kareem Timbers	So
CB	23	B. J. Tucker	Sr
DE	92	Jonathan Welsh	So
LB	27	Broderick Williams	Jr

Special teams

Pos.	#	Name	Class
K	97	Matt Allen	So
K	16	Scott Campbell	Jr
LS	86	Matt Katula	So
P	19	R. J. Morse	So

Head coach

- Barry Alvarez

Coordinators/assistant coaches

- Brian White – Offensive Coordinator/Running Backs
- Kevin Cosgrove – Defensive Coordinator/Inside Linebackers
- Paul Chryst – Tight Ends
- Ron Cooper – Defensive Backs
- Jeff Horton – Quarterbacks
- Jim Hueber – Offensive Line and Run Game Coordinator
- Henry Mason – Wide Receivers
- Brian Murphy – Outside Linebackers/Special Teams
- John Palermo – Assistant Head Coach/Defensive Line

Legend

- (C) Team captain
- (S) Suspended
- (I) Ineligible
- Injured
- Redshirt

Roster

=== Regular starters ===
Position	Player
Quarterback	Brooks Bollinger
Running back	Anthony Davis
Fullback	Matt Bernstein
Wide receiver	Darrin Charles
Wide receiver	Jonathan Orr
Tight End	Tony Paciotti
Left tackle	Ben Johnson
Left guard	Dan Buenning
Center	Al Johnson
Right guard	Jonathan Clinkscale
Right tackle	Jason Jowers

Position	Player
Defensive end	Jake Sprague
Defensive tackle	Anttaj Hawthorne
Defensive tackle	Jason Jefferson
Defensive end	Erasmus James
Outside linebacker	Alex Lewis
Inside linebacker	Jeff Mack
Outside linebacker	Kareem Timbers
Cornerback	Scott Starks
Strong safety	Jim Leonhard
Free safety	Ryan Aiello
Cornerback	B.J. Tucker

== 2003 NFL draft ==
Player	Position	Round	Overall Selection	NFL team
Al Johnson	Center	2	38	Dallas Cowboys
B. J. Tucker	Cornerback	6	178	Dallas Cowboys
Brooks Bollinger	Quarterback	6	200	New York Jets
Ben Johnson	Offensive Tackle	7	216	Detroit Lions
