= Draper (community), Wisconsin =

Draper, Wisconsin
- Unincorporated community
- Location within Wisconsin Location within the United States
- Coordinates: 45°53′11″N 90°49′52″W
- Country: United States
- State: Wisconsin
- County: Sawyer
- Elevation: 1,483 ft (452 m)
- Time zone: UTC-6 (Central (CST))
  - Summer (DST): UTC-5 (CDT)
- Area codes: 715 & 534
- GNIS feature ID: 1579142

Draper is an unincorporated community in the town of Draper, Sawyer County, Wisconsin, United States. Draper is located on Wisconsin Highway 70, 10 miles (16 km) northeast of Winter.

== History ==
A post office called Draper was established in 1906, and remained in operation until it was discontinued in 1935. The community was named for Lyman Draper, a Wisconsin historian.
