= Loretta, Wisconsin =

- Unincorporated community
- Location within Wisconsin Location within the United States
- Coordinates: 45°53′08″N 90°51′11″W
- Country: United States
- State: Wisconsin
- County: Sawyer
- Elevation: 1,447 ft (441 m)
- Time zone: UTC-6 (Central (CST))
  - Summer (DST): UTC-5 (CDT)
- Area codes: 715 & 534
- GNIS feature ID: 1579757

Loretta is an unincorporated community in the town of Draper, Sawyer County, Wisconsin, United States. Loretta is located on Wisconsin Highway 70 9 miles (14 km) northeast of Winter. It was named by Edward Hines, a lumberman, in 1892 for his wife and daughter, both named Loretta.

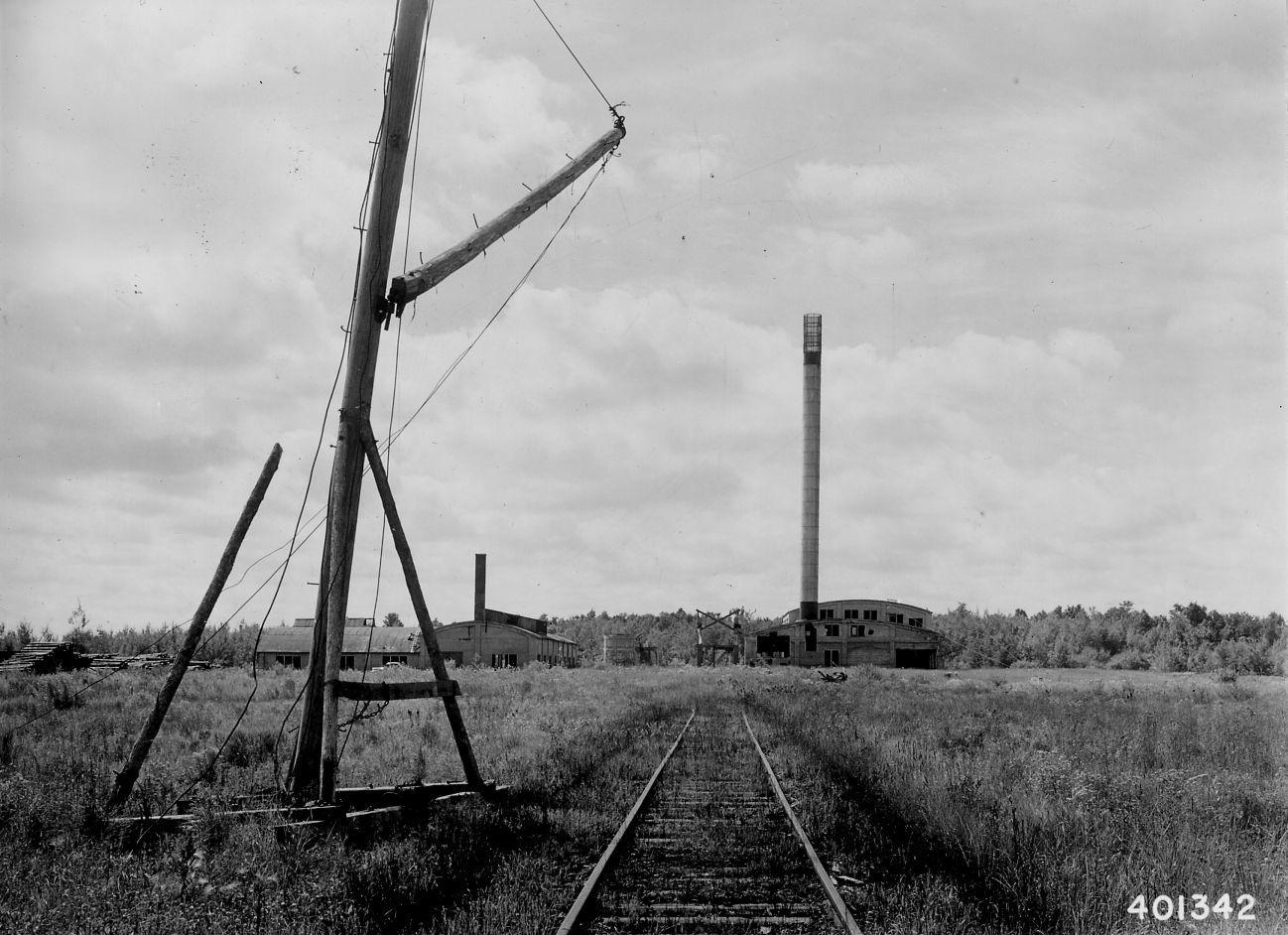
Photograph of Abandoned Sawmill of the E. F. Hines Lumber Company at Loretta, Wisconsin - NARA - 2128875
