= Upper Wisconsin Conference =

Wisconsin high school athletic conference (1926-1939)

The Upper Wisconsin Conference is a former high school athletic conference with its membership base in the northern part of the state. Founded in 1926 and disbanded in 1939, the conference and its member schools were affiliated with the Wisconsin Interscholastic Athletic Association.

== History ==
Location of Original Upper Wisconsin Conference Members

The Upper Wisconsin Conference was formed in 1926 by seven small high schools in far northern Wisconsin: Butternut, Fifield, Glidden, Hurley, Iron Belt, Mellen and Park Falls. Charter members of the conference were located in three counties (Ashland, Iron and Price) and five of the original seven schools were located along Wisconsin Highway 13, a major north-south thoroughfare connecting Wisconsin Dells and Superior. Hurley left the Upper Wisconsin Conference in 1928, only to return the next year. Their second stint in the conference ended in 1932, and the circuit continued with six member schools. In 1935, Fifield left the Upper Wisconsin Conference and were replaced by Saxon to keep the roster at six schools. By this time, the conference was referred to informally as the Soo Line League (not to be confused with a different league in the region also using that name). Fifield rejoined the conference the next year, offsetting the loss of Mellen and Park Falls to independent status. The conference originally ended play in 1937 after failing to agree to a league schedule, but reformed soon after as the Soo Line Athletic League by six former members (Butternut, Fifield, Glidden, Iron Belt, Mellen and Park Falls) along with Phillips, formerly of the other Soo Line League. Saxon was not included in this roster and joined the Indianhead Conference for the 1937-38 school year. This alignment lost Fifield and Iron Belt as members in 1938 and continued for one more season before suspending operations in 1939.

== Conference membership history ==
School	Location	Affiliation	Mascot	Colors	Joined	Left	Conference Joined	Current Conference
Butternut	Butternut, WI	Public	Midgets		1926	1939	Flambeau League	Northern Lights
Fifield	Fifield, WI	Public	Vikings		1926, 1936	1935, 1938	Independent	Closed in 1962 (consolidated into Park Falls)
Glidden	Glidden, WI	Public	Vikings		1926.	1939	Flambeau League	Closed in 2009 (merged into Chequamegon)
Hurley	Hurley, WI	Public	Midgets		1926, 1929	1928, 1932	Independent	Northern Lights
Iron Belt	Iron Belt, WI	Public	Hornets		1926	1938	Independent	Closed in 1957 (consolidated into Hurley)
Mellen	Mellen, WI	Public	Granite Diggers		1926, 1937	1936. 1939	Independent	Northern Lights
Park Falls	Park Falls, WI	Public	Cardinals		1926, 1937	1936, 1939	Independent	Closed in 2009 (merged into Chequamegon)
Saxon	Saxon, WI	Public	Knights		1935	1937	Indianhead	Closed in 1964 (consolidated into Hurley)
Phillips	Phillips, WI	Public	Loggers		1937	1939	Independent	Marawood
