= 1999 Big Ten Conference football season =

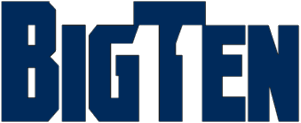
- League: NCAA Division I-A
- Sport: football
- Teams: 11
- Champions: Wisconsin

Football seasons
- 1998 2000

1999 Big Ten Conference football standings
	Conf.			Overall
Team	W		L	W		L
No. 4 Wisconsin $	7	–	1	10	–	2
No. 7 Michigan State	6	–	2	10	–	2
No. 5 Michigan %	6	–	2	10	–	2
No. 11 Penn State	5	–	3	10	–	3
No. 18 Minnesota	5	–	3	8	–	4
No. 24 Illinois	4	–	4	8	–	4
No. 25 Purdue	4	–	4	7	–	5
Ohio State	3	–	5	6	–	6
Indiana	3	–	5	4	–	7
Northwestern	1	–	7	3	–	8
Iowa	0	–	8	1	–	10
$ – BCS representative as conference champion; % – BCS at-large representative; Rankings from AP Poll

The 1999 Big Ten Conference football season was the 104th season of college football played by the member schools of the Big Ten Conference and was a part of the 1999 NCAA Division I-A football season.

== Regular season ==
At 7–1 in conference play (10–2 overall), No. 4 Wisconsin won the 1999 Big Ten title and a trip to the Rose Bowl, where they would defeat Stanford 17–9.

No. 7 Michigan State and No. 5 Michigan would tie for second with 6-2 (10–2 overall) records.

No. 11 Penn State and No. 18 Minnesota tied for fourth place by going 5–3 in conference play.

No. 24 Illinois and No. 25 Purdue tied for sixth place with an even 4–4 record within the league.

Ohio State and Indiana tied for eighth place at 3–5 in Big Ten play.

Northwestern finished in tenth at 1-7 (3–8 overall) while Iowa came in last at 0-8 (1–10 overall).

== Bowl games ==
Seven Big Ten teams played in bowl games, with the conference going 5–2 overall:

- Rose Bowl: No. 4 Wisconsin (Big Ten Champ) 17, No. 22 Stanford (Pac-10 Champ) 9
- Orange Bowl: No. 8 Michigan (At Large) 35, No. 5 Alabama (SEC Champ) 34 (OT)
- Florida Citrus Bowl: No. 9 Michigan State 37, No. 10 Florida (SEC Runner Up) 34
- Outback Bowl: No. 21 Georgia 28, No. 19 Purdue 25 (OT)
- MicronPC Bowl: Illinois 63, Virginia 21
- Sun Bowl: Oregon 24, No. 13 Minnesota 20
- Alamo Bowl: No. 14 Penn State* 24, No. 18 Texas A&M 0

Rankings are from the AP Poll and were set prior to the bowl games being played.
