= 2000 Big Ten Conference football season =

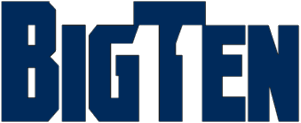
- League: NCAA Division I-A
- Sport: football
- Teams: 11
- Co-champions: Michigan, Northwestern, Purdue

Football seasons
- 1999 2001

2000 Big Ten Conference football standings
	Conf.			Overall
Team	W		L	W		L
No. 11 Michigan +	6	–	2	9	–	3
Northwestern +	6	–	2	8	–	4
No. 13 Purdue $+	6	–	2	8	–	4
Ohio State	5	–	3	8	–	4
No. 23 Wisconsin	4	–	4	9	–	4
Minnesota	4	–	4	6	–	6
Penn State	4	–	4	5	–	7
Iowa	3	–	5	3	–	9
Illinois	2	–	6	5	–	6
Michigan State	2	–	6	5	–	6
Indiana	2	–	6	3	–	8
$ – BCS representative as conference champion; + – Conference co-champions; Rankings from AP Poll

The 2000 Big Ten Conference football season was the 105th season of college football played by the member schools of the Big Ten Conference and was a part of the 2000 NCAA Division I-A football season.

== Regular season ==
With 6-2 conference records, No. 11 Michigan, Northwestern, and No. 13 Purdue shared the 2000 Big Ten championship. Due to Big Ten rules which resolved first-place ties by eliminating the most recent invitees, Purdue was awarded the trip to the Rose Bowl, where they would lose to Washington 24–34. It was Purdue's first trip to Pasadena since the 1967 Rose Bowl.

Ohio State came in fourth at 5-3 (8–4 overall), while No. 23 Wisconsin, Minnesota, and Penn State tied for fifth place with 4-4 conference records.

Iowa took eighth place by going 3-5 (3–9 overall) and were followed up by a three-way tie for ninth between Illinois, Michigan State, and Indiana, who all went 2–6 in the conference.

== Bowl games ==
Six Big Ten teams played in bowl games, with the conference going 2–4 overall:

- Rose Bowl: No. 4 Washington 34, No. 14 Purdue 24
- Florida Citrus Bowl: No. 17 Michigan 31, No. 20 Auburn 28
- Outback Bowl: South Carolina 24, No. 19 Ohio State 7
- MicronPC.com Bowl: NC State 38, Minnesota 30
- Sun Bowl: Wisconsin 21, UCLA 20
- Alamo Bowl: No. 9 Nebraska 66, No. 18 Northwestern 17

Rankings are from the AP Poll and were set prior to the bowl games being played.
