= 1989 Big Ten Conference football season =

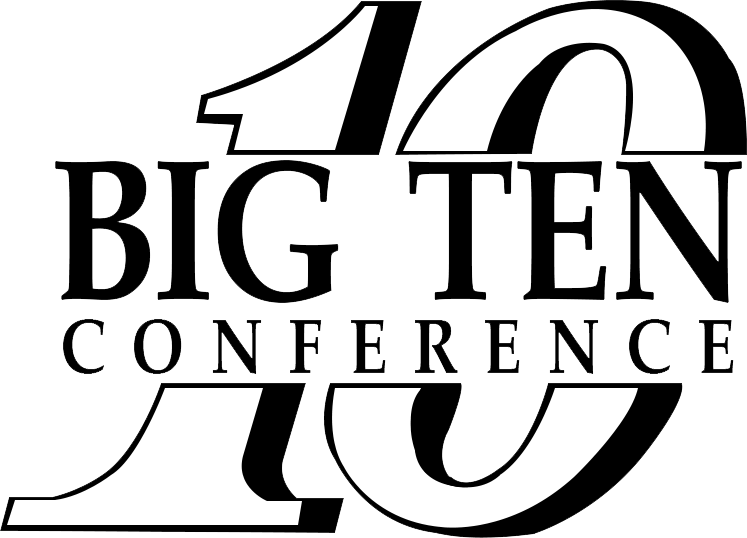
- League: NCAA Division I-A
- Sport: Football
- Teams: 10
- Champions: Michigan

Football seasons

1989 Big Ten Conference football standings
	Conf.					Overall
Team	W		L		T	W		L		T
No. 7 Michigan $	8	–	0	–	0	10	–	2	–	0
No. 10 Illinois	7	–	1	–	0	10	–	2	–	0
No. 16 Michigan State	6	–	2	–	0	8	–	4	–	0
No. 24 Ohio State	6	–	2	–	0	8	–	4	–	0
Minnesota	4	–	4	–	0	6	–	5	–	0
Indiana	3	–	5	–	0	5	–	6	–	0
Iowa	3	–	5	–	0	5	–	6	–	0
Purdue	2	–	6	–	0	3	–	8	–	0
Wisconsin	1	–	7	–	0	2	–	9	–	0
Northwestern	0	–	8	–	0	0	–	11	–	0
$ – Conference champion; Rankings from AP Poll

The 1989 Big Ten Conference football season was the 94th season of college football played by the member schools of the Big Ten Conference and was a part of the 1989 NCAA Division I-A football season.

== Regular season ==
With an 8-0 conference record, No. 7 Michigan won their second straight Big Ten title and a trip to Pasadena, where they would lose to USC 17-10. No. 10 Illinois finished second at 7-1, their lone conference loss coming to the Wolverines. The Fighting Illini would defeat Virginia in the Citrus Bowl, 31-21

No. 16 Michigan State and No. 24 Ohio State tied for third with 6-2 conference marks, and both went 8-4 overall as well. Minnesota came in fifth at 4-4 (6-5 overall).

Indiana and Iowa tied for sixth place at 3-5 in Big Ten play, both also going 5-6 overall.

Purdue took eighth at 2-6 (3-8 overall), Wisconsin ninth at 1-7 (2-9 overall), and Northwestern came in last at 0-8 (0-11 overall).

== Bowl games ==
Four Big Ten teams played in bowl games, with the conference going 2-2 overall:

- Rose Bowl: No. 12 USC 17, No. 3 Michigan 10
- Hall of Fame Bowl: No. 9 Auburn 31, No. 21 Ohio State 14
- Florida Citrus Bowl: No. 11 Illinois 31, No. 15 Virginia 21
- Aloha Bowl: No. 22 Michigan State 33, No. 25 Hawaii 13
