= 2001 Big Ten Conference football season =

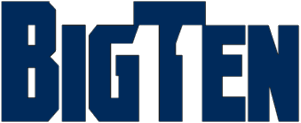
- League: NCAA Division I-A
- Sport: football
- Teams: 11
- Champions: Illinois

Football seasons
- 2000 2002

2001 Big Ten Conference football standings
	Conf.			Overall
Team	W		L	W		L
No. 12 Illinois $	7	–	1	10	–	2
No. 20 Michigan	6	–	2	8	–	4
Ohio State	5	–	3	7	–	5
Iowa	4	–	4	7	–	5
Purdue	4	–	4	6	–	6
Penn State	4	–	4	5	–	6
Indiana	4	–	4	5	–	6
Michigan State	3	–	5	7	–	5
Wisconsin	3	–	5	5	–	7
Minnesota	2	–	6	4	–	7
Northwestern	2	–	6	4	–	7
$ – BCS representative as conference champion; Rankings from AP Poll

The 2001 Big Ten Conference football season was the 106th season of college football played by the member schools of the Big Ten Conference and was a part of the 2001 NCAA Division I-A football season.

== Regular season ==
No. 12 Illinois won the 2001 Big Ten football championship with a 7–1 conference record and going 10–2 overall. This was the first championship for the Fighting Illini since 1990 and their first outright title since 1983. The Big Ten champion is usually invited to the Rose Bowl, however the 2002 Rose Bowl was the designated BCS National Championship Game for 2001, so Illinois was instead invited to the 2002 Sugar Bowl.

Michigan came in second place at 6-2 (8–4 overall), being denied a co-championship by losing to rival Ohio State in their regular season finale. Ohio State came in third with a 5–3 record (7–5 overall).

With 4-4 Big Ten marks, there was a four-way tie for fourth place between Iowa, Purdue, Penn State, and Indiana.

Michigan State and Wisconsin tied for eighth place at 3–5 in Big Ten play, while Minnesota and Northwestern tied for tenth by going 2–6 in the conference.

== Bowl games ==
Five Big Ten teams played in bowl games, with the conference going 1–4 overall:

- Sugar Bowl: LSU 47, Illinois 34
- Alamo Bowl: Iowa 19, Texas Tech 16
- Sun Bowl Washington State 33, Purdue 27
- Outback Bowl South Carolina 31, Ohio State 28
- Florida Citrus Bowl: Tennessee 45, Michigan 17
