= 1987 Big Ten Conference football season =

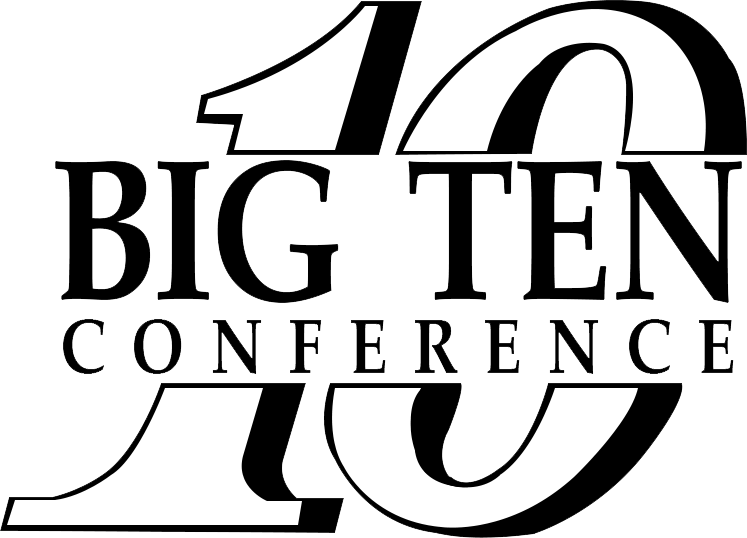
- League: NCAA Division I-A
- Sport: Football
- Teams: 10
- Champions: Michigan State

Football seasons

1987 Big Ten Conference football standings
	Conf.					Overall
Team	W		L		T	W		L		T
No. 8 Michigan State $	7	–	0	–	1	9	–	2	–	1
No. 16 Iowa	6	–	2	–	0	10	–	3	–	0
Indiana	6	–	2	–	0	8	–	4	–	0
No. 19 Michigan	5	–	3	–	0	8	–	4	–	0
Ohio State	4	–	4	–	0	6	–	4	–	1
Minnesota	3	–	5	–	0	6	–	5	–	0
Purdue	3	–	5	–	0	3	–	7	–	1
Illinois	2	–	5	–	1	3	–	7	–	1
Northwestern	2	–	6	–	0	2	–	8	–	1
Wisconsin	1	–	7	–	0	3	–	8	–	0
$ – Conference champion; Rankings from AP Poll

The 1987 Big Ten Conference football season was the 92nd season of college football played by the member schools of the Big Ten Conference and was a part of the 1987 NCAA Division I-A football season.

== Regular season ==
No. 8 Michigan State took home the 1987 Big Ten championship with a 7-0-1 record (9–2–1 overall) and earned the right to represent the conference in the Rose Bowl Game. The Spartans would defeat USC 20–17.

No. 16 Iowa and Indiana tied for second at 6–2 in conference play, finishing 10-3 and 8–4, respectively. No. 19 Michigan came in fourth at 5-3 (8–4 overall) while Ohio State took fifth place at 4-4 (6–4–1 overall).

Minnesota and Purdue tied for sixth place with 3-5 Big Ten records, going 6-5 and 3-7-1 overall, respectively. Illinois was eighth at 2-5-1 (3–7–1 overall), Northwestern ninth at 2-6 (2–8–1 overall), and Wisconsin finished last at 1-7 (3–8 overall).

== Bowl games ==
Four Big Ten teams played in bowl games, with the conference going 3–1 overall:

- Rose Bowl: No. 8 Michigan State 20, No. 16 USC 17
- Hall of Fame Bowl: Michigan 28, Alabama 24
- Holiday Bowl: No. 18 Iowa 20, Wyoming 19
- Peach Bowl: No. 17 Tennessee 27, Indiana 22
