= B. J. Tucker =

American gridiron football player (born 1980)

B.J. Tucker
No. 30
- Position: Cornerback

Personal information
- Born: October 12, 1980 (age 46); Freetown, Sierra Leone
- Listed height: 5 ft 10.75 in (1.80 m)
- Listed weight: 192 lb (87 kg)

Career information
- High school: Nicolet (Glendale, Wisconsin, U.S.)
- College: Wisconsin
- NFL draft: 2003: 6th round, 178th overall pick

Career history
- Dallas Cowboys (2003)*; New Orleans Saints (2003)*; Oakland Raiders (2003)*; Pittsburgh Steelers (2003); Seattle Seahawks (2005)*; → Amsterdam Admirals (2005); San Francisco 49ers (2005–2007); BC Lions (2008)
- * Offseason or practice squad member only

Awards and highlights
- World Bowl champion (XIII); All-NFL Europe (2005)

Career NFL statistics
- Games played: 10
- Total tackles: 19
- Pass deflections: 2
- Stats at Pro Football Reference

Baigeh Joe Tucker (born October 12, 1980) is an American former professional football player who was a cornerback in the National Football League (NFL). He played college football for the Wisconsin Badgers. He is distinguished as being the first Sierra Leonean to play in the National Football League (NFL).

== Early life ==
B.J., short for Baigeh Joe, was born in Sierra Leone and moved with family to Seattle in 1990. He did not take up football until his freshman year of high school.

Tucker attended Nicolet High School, where he played as a cornerback, wide receiver and running back. He led the team in rushing as a junior. The next year, he received Super Prep All-American, All-conference and North Shore Conference Defensive Back of the Year honors, while registering 38 receptions for 628 yards at wide receiver.

He was a standout track and field athlete, winning the state 100 and 200 metres. He also won those events at the Nike Junior Olympics meet in Seattle in 1998. He won 6 state track titles (two each in the 100, 200 and 4 × 100 relay) and was named Wisconsin's 1998 Track Athlete of the Year.

== College career ==
=== Football ===
Tucker accepted a scholarship from the University of Wisconsin–Madison. He appeared in only one game as a freshman.

In 2000, he was the top backup and nickel back, appearing in 9 games (2 starts), while making 23 tackles and 7 passes defensed. The next year, he started the first two contests and finished with 9 games appearances, 15 tackles and 2 passes defensed.

As a senior, he focused on football and became a starter at right cornerback, posting 76 tackles, 5 interceptions (led the team and second in the conference), 12 passes defensed, one fumble recovery and one forced fumble. He finished his college career after playing in 34 games (18 starts), registering 115 tackles (94 solo), 21 passes defensed and 5 interceptions.

=== Track and field ===
In 1999, he was a part of the school's Big Ten Conference Champion indoor and outdoor teams, finishing second in the 60 metres at the 2000 indoor finals. In 2000, he helped defend the Big Ten Conference Champion indoor and outdoor championships. In 2001, he finished second in the 100 metres as the school won the Big Ten Conference outdoor track title.

His personal bests were 10.35 seconds in the 100 metres, 21.10 in the 200 metres and 6.70 seconds in the 60 metres.

Personal bests

| Event | Time (seconds) | Venue | Date |
|---|---|---|---|
| 60 meters | 6.70 | Ames, Iowa | February 12, 2000 |
| 100 meters | 10.35 | Tempe, Arizona | March 18, 2000 |
| 200 meters | 21.10 | Iowa City, Iowa | May 20, 2000 |

== Professional career ==
Pre-draft measurables
| Height | Weight | 40-yard dash | 10-yard split | 20-yard split | 20-yard shuttle | Three-cone drill | Vertical jump | Broad jump | Bench press |
|---|---|---|---|---|---|---|---|---|---|
| 5 ft 11 in (1.80 m) | 188 lb (85 kg) | 4.34 s | 1.61 s | 2.56 s | 3.98 s | 6.79 s | 35 in (0.89 m) | 10 ft 6 in (3.20 m) | 16 reps |
All values from NFL Combine

=== Dallas Cowboys ===
Tucker was selected by the Dallas Cowboys in the sixth round (178th overall) of the 2003 NFL draft, because of his track speed. He was waived on August 17.

=== New Orleans Saints ===
On August 19, 2003, he was claimed off waivers by the New Orleans Saints and was later released on August 31.

=== Oakland Raiders ===
The Oakland Raiders signed him to their practice squad on September 4, 2003, but was later cut.

=== Pittsburgh Steelers ===
The Pittsburgh Steelers signed him to their practice squad on December 12, 2003. He was signed to the active roster on December 24. He was waived before the start of the season on May 20, 2004.

=== Seattle Seahawks ===
On February 1, 2005, he was signed as a free agent by the Seattle Seahawks and was allocated to the Amsterdam Admirals of NFL Europe. He had a strong showing there, including being named All-NFL Europe, tied for the league lead with 5 interceptions and helped his team win World Bowl XIII. He was released on September 4.

=== San Francisco 49ers ===
On October 8, 2005, the San Francisco 49ers signed him to their roster, before being cut 2 days later and signed him to the practice squad on October 12. He would later be waived and signed during different periods of times. On July 16, 2007, he was placed on the injured reserve list with a pectoral muscle injury. He wasn't re-signed after the season.

=== BC Lions ===
On September 16, 2008, he signed with the BC Lions of the Canadian Football League. He played in four games mainly on special teams, before being released on June 18, 2009. He is currently a firefighter in Tacoma, WA, serving since 2011.
