= 2002 Alamo Bowl =

2002 MasterCard Alamo Bowl
Colorado Buffaloes	Wisconsin Badgers
(9–4)	(7–6)
Big 12	Big Ten
28	31
Head coach: Gary Barnett	Head coach: Barry Alvarez
AP / Coaches / BCS; 14 / 14 / 13
	1	2	3	4	OT	Total
Colorado	14	0	14	0	0	28
Wisconsin	7	14	0	7	3	31
- Date: December 28, 2002
- Season: 2002
- Stadium: Alamodome
- Location: San Antonio, Texas
- Favorite: Colorado by 7
- Referee: Terry Brown (SEC)

United States TV coverage
- Network: ESPN
- Announcers: Ron Franklin, Mike Gottfried and Adrian Karsten

The 2002 Alamo Bowl featured the Colorado Buffaloes and the Wisconsin Badgers.

Colorado got on the board first, following a 91-yard interception return by Colorado cornerback Donald Strickland. Anthony Davis scored Wisconsin's first points, as he rushed 7 yards for a touchdown, to tie the game at 7. Colorado quarterback Robert Hodge threw a 10-yard touchdown pass to wide receiver D. J. Hackett, to give Colorado a 14–7 lead.

Brooks Bollinger connected with wide receiver Brandon Williams for a 10-yard touchdown pass to tie the game at 14. He later threw a 7-yard touchdown pass to Darrin Charles to give Wisconsin a 21–14 lead, that held during halftime. Chris Brown rushed four yards for a touchdown in the third quarter, to tie the game at 21.

Zac Colvin threw an 11-yard touchdown pass to Hackett to give Colorado a 28–21 lead. In the fourth quarter, Bollinger rushed one yard for a touchdown to tie the game at 28 in the final minute. The game headed into overtime, where the Wisconsin defense pushed Colorado backward, forcing them to take a 45-yard FG, which missed wide right. Wisconsin then just needed to stay in FG range, and Mike Allen kicked a 37-yard field goal to win the game for Wisconsin, 31–28.
