= Tony, Wisconsin =

- Village
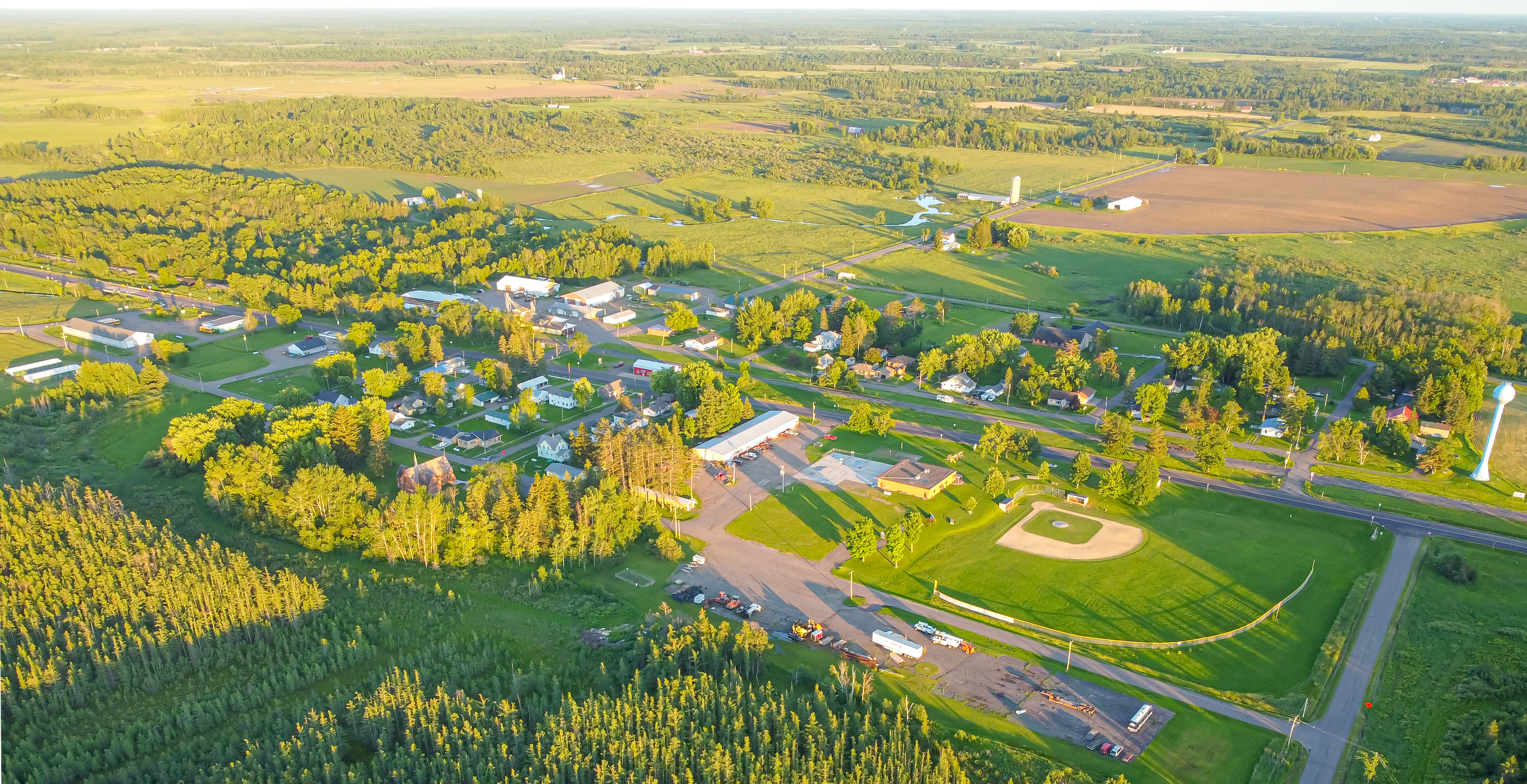

- Location of Tony in Rusk County, Wisconsin.
- Coordinates: 45°28′52″N 90°59′41″W
- Country: United States
- State: Wisconsin
- County: Rusk

Area
  - Total: 2.02 sq mi (5.24 km^{2})
  - Land: 2.02 sq mi (5.24 km^{2})
  - Water: 0 sq mi (0.00 km^{2})
- Elevation: 1,230 ft (370 m)

Population (2020)
  - Total: 105
  - Density: 51.9/sq mi (20.0/km^{2})
- Time zone: UTC-6 (Central (CST))
  - Summer (DST): UTC-5 (CDT)
- Area codes: 715 & 534
- FIPS code: 55-80225
- GNIS feature ID: 1575507
- Website: http://villageoftony.com/

Tony is a village in Rusk County, Wisconsin, United States. The population was 105 at the 2020 census.

== Geography ==
Tony is located at 45°28′52″N 90°59′41″W (45.481083, -90.994763).

According to the United States Census Bureau, the village has a total area of 2.03 square miles (5.26 km^{2}), all land. When founded, it was named Deer Tail, as the village is located on Deer Tail Creek.

Tony is situated along U.S. Highway 8 and County Road I.

== Demographics ==
Historical population
Census	Pop.	Note	%±
1920	216		—
1930	160		−25.9%
1940	186		16.3%
1950	182		−2.2%
1960	162		−11.0%
1970	144		−11.1%
1980	146		1.4%
1990	114		−21.9%
2000	105		−7.9%
2010	113		7.6%
2020	105		−7.1%
U.S. Decennial Census

=== 2010 census ===
As of the census of 2010, there were 113 people, 47 households, and 29 families living in the village. The population density was 55.7 inhabitants per square mile (21.5/km^{2}). There were 52 housing units at an average density of 25.6 per square mile (9.9/km^{2}). The racial makeup of the village was 92.0% White, 6.2% African American, 0.9% Native American, and 0.9% from other races. Hispanic or Latino of any race were 0.9% of the population.

There were 47 households, of which 21.3% had children under the age of 18 living with them, 42.6% were married couples living together, 8.5% had a female householder with no husband present, 10.6% had a male householder with no wife present, and 38.3% were non-families. 23.4% of all households were made up of individuals, and 10.7% had someone living alone who was 65 years of age or older. The average household size was 2.40 and the average family size was 2.83.

The median age in the village was 42.8 years. 24.8% of residents were under the age of 18; 6.2% were between the ages of 18 and 24; 19.4% were from 25 to 44; 25.6% were from 45 to 64; and 23.9% were 65 years of age or older. The gender makeup of the village was 49.6% male and 50.4% female.

=== 2000 census ===
As of the census of 2000, there were 105 people, 43 households, and 27 families living in the village. The population density was 51.7 people per square mile (20.0/km^{2}). There were 45 housing units at an average density of 22.2 per square mile (8.6/km^{2}). The racial makeup of the village was 99.05% White, 0.95% from other races. Hispanic or Latino of any race were 0.95% of the population.

There were 43 households, out of which 25.6% had children under the age of 18 living with them, 48.8% were married couples living together, 9.3% had a female householder with no husband present, and 34.9% were non-families. 32.6% of all households were made up of individuals, and 23.3% had someone living alone who was 65 years of age or older. The average household size was 2.40 and the average family size was 3.00.

In the village, the population was spread out, with 23.8% under the age of 18, 8.6% from 18 to 24, 26.7% from 25 to 44, 23.8% from 45 to 64, and 17.1% who were 65 years of age or older. The median age was 36 years. For every 100 females, there were 78.0 males. For every 100 females age 18 and over, there were 86.0 males.

The median income for a household in the village was $21,563, and the median income for a family was $31,250. Males had a median income of $26,875 versus $21,250 for females. The per capita income for the village was $16,328. There were 16.7% of families and 17.4% of the population living below the poverty line, including 50.0% of under eighteens and 11.8% of those over 64.

== Notable people ==
- Jim Leonhard, former Wisconsin Badgers head coach, former NFL and Wisconsin Badgers defensive back, grew up in Tony.
- John Q. Radcliffe, former Wisconsin State Representative, attended high school in Tony.
