= Draper, Wisconsin =

- Town
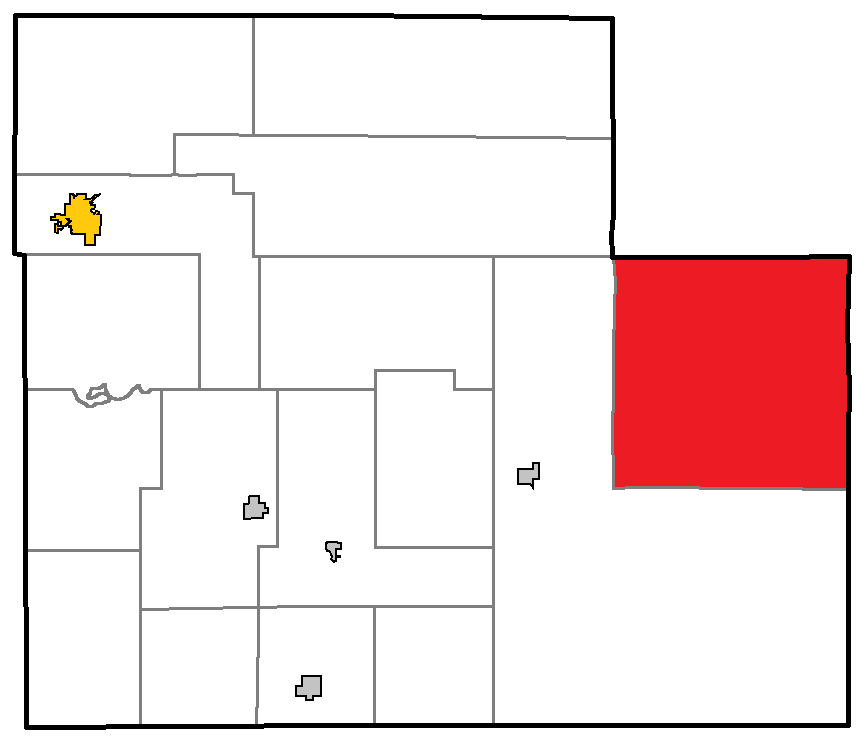
- Location of Draper, within Sawyer County
- Coordinates: 45°54′13″N 90°49′51″W
- Country: United States
- State: Wisconsin
- County: Sawyer

Area
  - Total: 138.2 sq mi (358.0 km^{2})
  - Land: 136.1 sq mi (352.5 km^{2})
  - Water: 2.1 sq mi (5.5 km^{2})
- Elevation: 1,480 ft (451 m)

Population (2020)
  - Total: 241
  - Density: 1.77/sq mi (0.684/km^{2})
- Time zone: UTC-6 (Central (CST))
  - Summer (DST): UTC-5 (CDT)
- Area codes: 715 & 534
- FIPS code: 55-20825
- GNIS feature ID: 1583100
- Website: https://townofdraperwi.gov/

Draper is a town in Sawyer County, Wisconsin, United States. The population was 241 at the 2020 census. The unincorporated communities of Draper, Loretta, and Oxbo are located in the town.

== Geography ==
According to the United States Census Bureau, the town has a total area of 138.2 square miles (358.0 km^{2}), of which 136.1 square miles (352.5 km^{2}) is land and 2.1 square miles (5.5 km^{2}) (1.54%) is water.

== Demographics ==
As of the census of 2000, there were 171 people, 84 households, and 50 families residing in the town. The population density was 1.3 people per square mile (0.5/km^{2}). There were 397 housing units at an average density of 2.9 per square mile (1.1/km^{2}). The racial makeup of the town was 94.74% White, 4.68% Native American, and 0.58% from two or more races. Hispanic or Latino of any race were 1.17% of the population.

There were 84 households, out of which 15.5% had children under the age of 18 living with them, 52.4% were married couples living together, 3.6% had a female householder with no husband present, and 39.3% were non-families. 34.5% of all households were made up of individuals, and 17.9% had someone living alone who was 65 years of age or older. The average household size was 2.02 and the average family size was 2.57.

In the town, the population was spread out, with 14.6% under the age of 18, 2.3% from 18 to 24, 19.9% from 25 to 44, 38.0% from 45 to 64, and 25.1% who were 65 years of age or older. The median age was 54 years. For every 100 females, there were 128.0 males. For every 100 females age 18 and over, there were 121.2 males.

The median income for a household in the town was $27,500, and the median income for a family was $31,875. Males had a median income of $28,750 versus $25,125 for females. The per capita income for the town was $15,647. About 17.0% of families and 21.6% of the population were below the poverty line, including 37.5% of those under the age of eighteen and 4.9% of those 65 or over.
