= Jim Leonhard =

American football player and coach (born 1982)

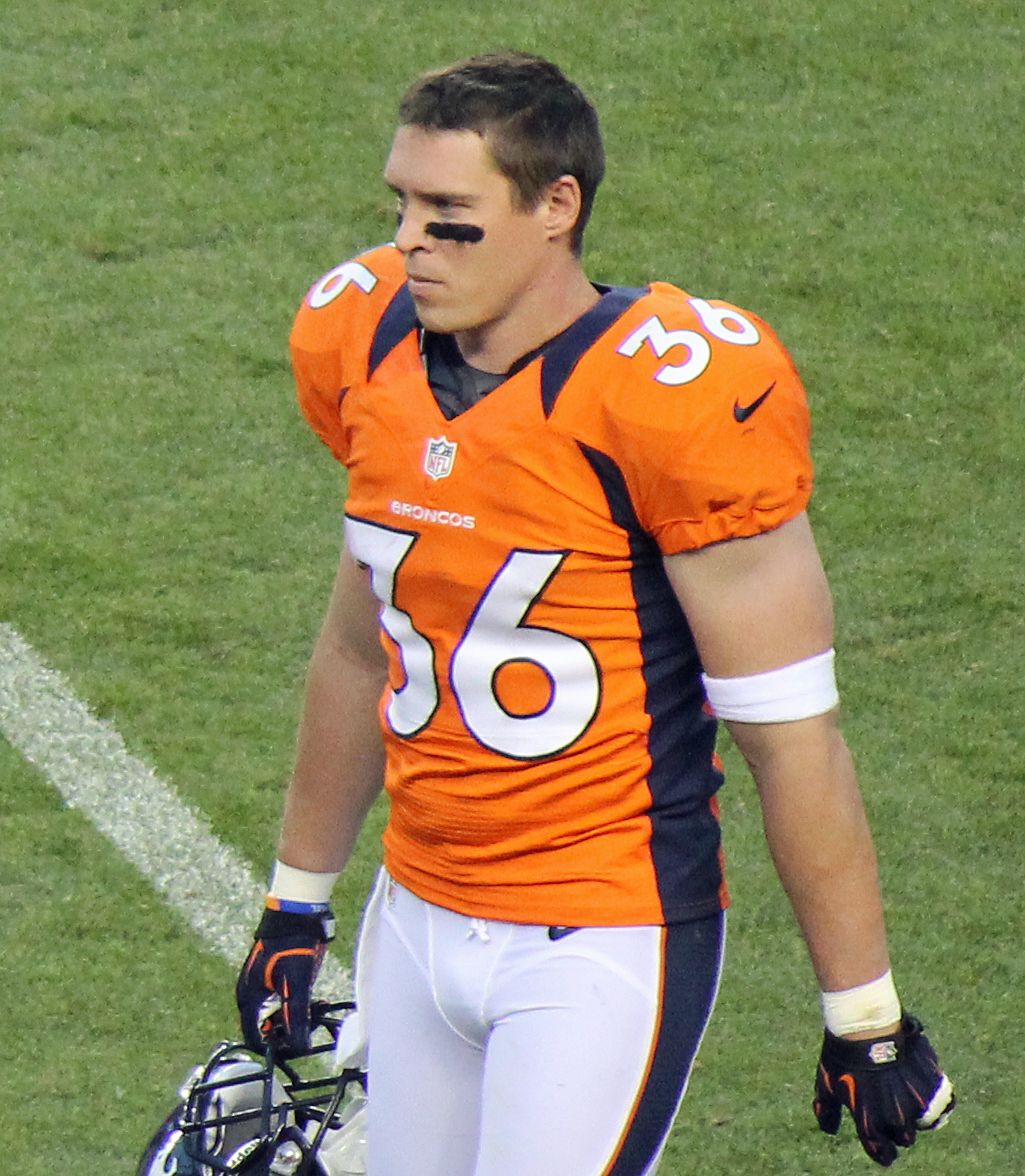
- Leonhard with the Denver Broncos in 2012

Buffalo Bills
- Title: Defensive coordinator

Personal information
- Born: October 27, 1982 (age 44); Ladysmith, Wisconsin, U.S.
- Listed height: 5 ft 8 in (1.73 m)
- Listed weight: 188 lb (85 kg)

Career information
- Position: Free safety (No. 42, 36, 35, 30)
- High school: Flambeau (Tony, Wisconsin)
- College: Wisconsin (2001–2004)
- NFL draft: 2005: undrafted

Career history

Playing
- Buffalo Bills (2005–2007); Baltimore Ravens (2008); New York Jets (2009–2011); Denver Broncos (2012); New Orleans Saints (2013)*; Buffalo Bills (2013); Cleveland Browns (2014)
- * Offseason or practice squad member only

Coaching
- Wisconsin (2016–2022); Defensive backs coach (2016); Defensive coordinator & defensive backs coach (2017–2022); Interim head coach (2022); Illinois (2023) Senior football analyst; Denver Broncos (2024–2025); Defensive backs coach & pass game coordinator (2024); Assistant head coach & pass game coordinator (2025); Buffalo Bills (2026–present) Defensive coordinator

Awards and highlights
- 2× Second-team All-American (2002, 2004); 3× First-team All-Big Ten (2002-2004)

Career NFL statistics
- Total tackles: 431
- Sacks: 4.5
- Forced fumbles: 3
- Interceptions: 14
- Return yards: 1,277
- Total touchdowns: 1
- Stats at Pro Football Reference

Head coaching record
- Career: NCAA: 4–3 (.571)
- Coaching profile at Pro Football Reference

James Andrew Leonhard (born October 27, 1982) is an American professional football coach and former player who is the defensive coordinator for the Buffalo Bills of the National Football League (NFL). He played professionally in the NFL as a safety for 10 seasons.

Leonhard played college football for the Wisconsin Badgers and was signed by the Buffalo Bills as an undrafted free agent. He also played in the NFL for the Baltimore Ravens, New York Jets, Denver Broncos, New Orleans Saints and Cleveland Browns.

== Early life ==
Leonhard played high school football at Flambeau High School in Tony, Wisconsin, where he was the starting quarterback and strong safety. During his freshman year, 1997, the Flambeau Falcons won the Wisconsin state championship in football in division six over River Ridge high school. He was a team captain in his junior and senior seasons, the same seasons in which he was a first-team All-State performer. He was also named team MVP in his senior year.

== College career ==
Leonhard was a walk-on football player at the University of Wisconsin–Madison, having received no Division I-A scholarship offers out of high school. He was not awarded a scholarship until his senior year, despite the fact that he had been a regular starting safety before that season and had already been named All-Big Ten twice. Noted for his speed, leaping ability, and sure tackling, Leonhard totaled 21 interceptions (tied with Jamar Fletcher for the most in school history) and made 281 tackles. He held the Big Ten Conference career punt return yardage record with 1,347 yards until Michigan's Steve Breaston eclipsed his mark in 2006.

== Professional career ==
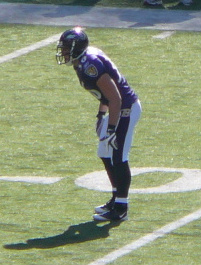
Leonhard with the Ravens.

Pre-draft measurables
Height	Weight	Arm length	Hand span	40-yard dash	Bench press
5 ft 8 3/8 in (1.74 m)	191 lb (87 kg)	29 3/4 in (0.76 m)	9 1/4 in (0.23 m)	4.63 s	19 reps
All values from NFL Combine

=== Buffalo Bills (first stint) ===
Leonhard was the only undrafted rookie on the 53-man opening day roster for the 2005 Bills. He played in 10 games, finishing with one kick return for 36 yards.

Leonhard was released during the 2006 preseason; however, he was signed 11 days later following an injury to fellow Wisconsin alumnus Troy Vincent. He finished the 2006 season with 13 tackles and one fumble recovery while making his first career start on December 10.

In 2007, Leonhard stepped in for injured starter Ko Simpson and recorded 13 tackles on opening day against the Denver Broncos. He went on to record 54 tackles, two interceptions, three passes defended and one fumble recovery, despite being hampered by a calf injury halfway through the season.

=== Baltimore Ravens ===
In 2008, Leonhard signed with the Baltimore Ravens, where he started in 13 of 16 regular season games, replacing the injured Dawan Landry. He set career-high marks with 68 tackles and one sack to go along with one interception, which he returned for a TD against the Cincinnati Bengals.

=== New York Jets ===
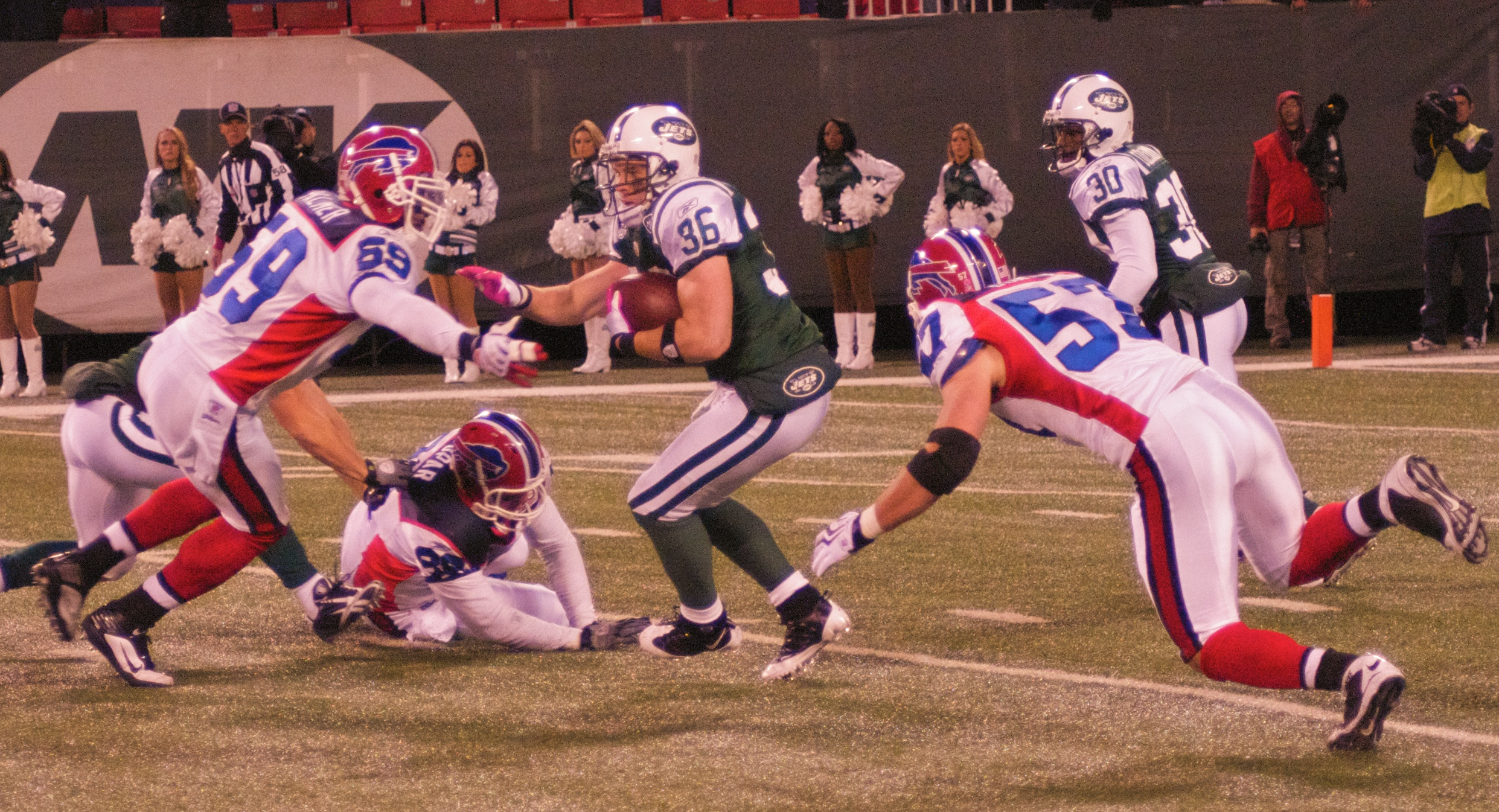
Leonhard with the Jets

In 2009, Leonhard signed with the New York Jets, reuniting him with former Ravens defensive coordinator and later New York Jets head coach, Rex Ryan. Terms were $6 million for 3 years with $1 million guaranteed.

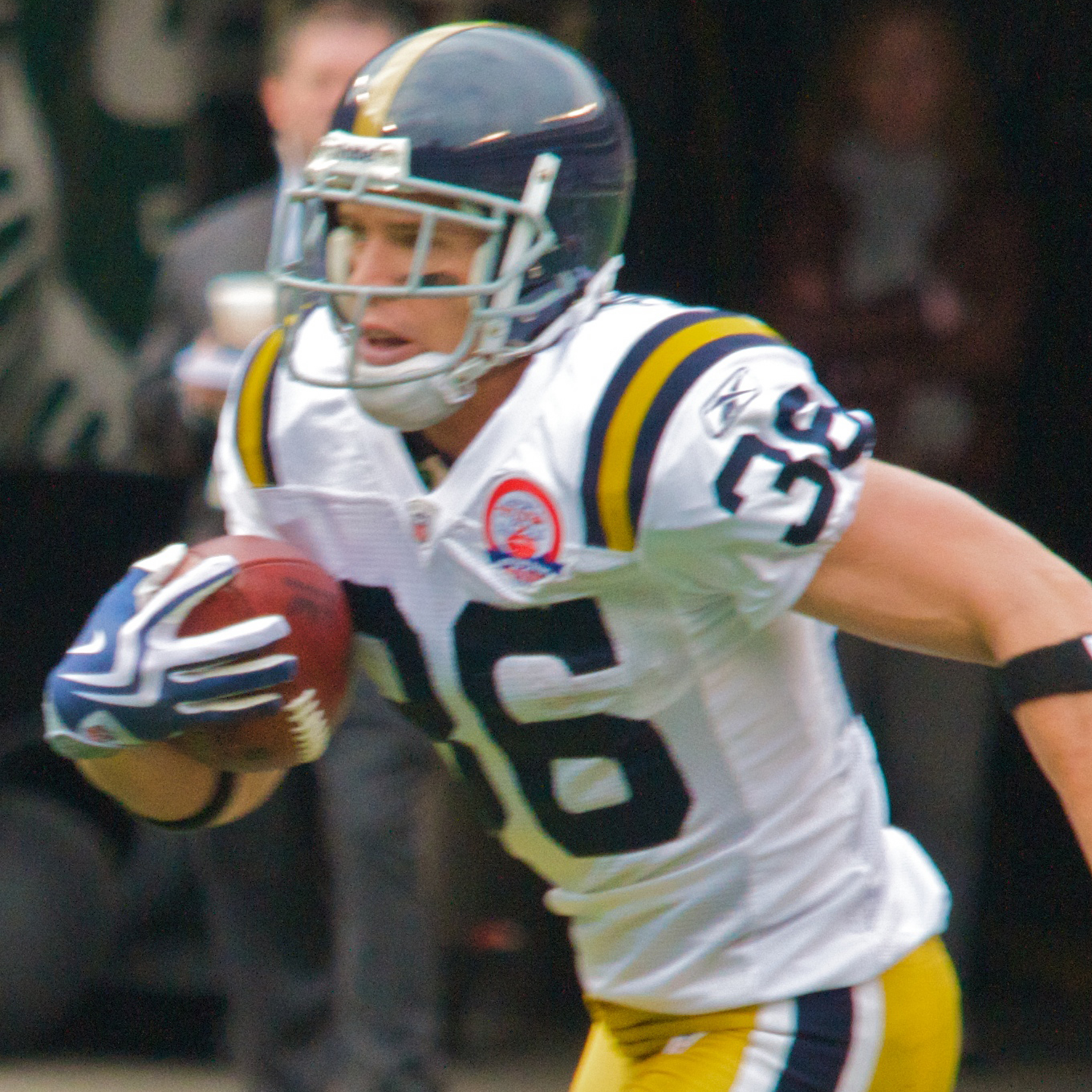
While with the New York Jets.

During the 2009 year, Leonhard started all 16 games making 66 tackles, 2.5 sacks, one interception, six passes defended and one forced fumble. His efforts led to the Jets going to the play-offs but eventually losing to the Indianapolis Colts in the AFC Championship game.

On December 3, 2010, Leonhard suffered a fractured tibia after a collision with wide receiver Patrick Turner during practice. He underwent surgery the same night and was ruled out for the rest of the 2010 season. Leonhard played 11 games in 2010 making 56 tackles, one interception, four passes defended, one forced fumble and one fumble recovery. The Jets would go to the playoffs again but lose the AFC Championship to the Pittsburgh Steelers.

During a game against the Kansas City Chiefs on December 11, 2011, Leonhard landed awkwardly after catching an interception thrown by Tyler Palko. Leonhard was carried off the field by a medical cart. A few days later, an MRI revealed that there was a torn patellar tendon in his right knee. As a result, Leonhard was eliminated for the rest of the 2011 season. Leonhard played 13 games in 2011 making 48 tackles, one interception, six passes defended, one forced fumble and one fumble recovery.

=== Denver Broncos ===
In August 2012, Leonhard agreed to a one-year deal with the Denver Broncos. During the 2012 season with the Broncos, Leonhard made 17 tackles and had two interceptions, three passes defended and one fumble recovery in 16 games (one start).

=== New Orleans Saints ===
In April 2013, Leonhard signed a one-year deal with the New Orleans Saints. He was released before the season.

=== Buffalo Bills (second stint) ===
Leonhard signed a contract with the Bills in September 2013, returning to the club where he started his professional career. During his first season back with Buffalo in 2013, Leonhard made 41 tackles, four interceptions and five passes defended in 16 games (six starts).

=== Cleveland Browns ===
In 2014, Leonhard joined the Cleveland Browns. He made 27 tackles, one sack, two interceptions and three passes defensed. Leonhard retired following the season.

== NFL career statistics ==
Legend
**Bold**	Career high

Year	Team	Games		Tackles				Fumbles			Interceptions					
Year	Team	G	GS	Comb	Total	Ast	Sack	FF	FR	Yds	Int	Yds	Avg	Lng	TD	PD
2005	BUF	10	0	5	1	4	0.0	0	0	0	0	0	0	0	0	0
2006	BUF	15	1	13	11	2	0.0	0	**1**	0	0	0	0	0	0	0
2007	BUF	13	6	54	44	10	0.0	0	0	0	2	60	30	36	0	3
2008	BAL	16	13	69	55	14	1.0	0	**1**	0	1	35	35	35	**1**	**6**
2009	NYJ	16	16	**76**	53	**23**	**2.5**	**1**	0	0	1	44	**44**	**44**	0	5
2010	NYJ	11	11	61	**57**	4	0.0	**1**	**1**	-1	1	2	2	2	0	4
2011	NYJ	13	13	48	38	10	0.0	**1**	**1**	**3**	1	0	0	0	0	**6**
2012	DEN	16	1	18	13	5	0.0	0	**1**	0	2	0	0	0	0	2
2013	BUF	16	7	41	30	11	0.0	0	0	0	**4**	**72**	18	41	0	**6**
2014	CLE	16	5	43	27	16	1.0	0	0	0	2	34	17	34	0	3
Career		142	73	428	329	99	4.5	3	5	2	14	247	17.6	44	1	35

== Coaching career ==
=== Wisconsin ===
In February 2016, Leonhard joined Paul Chryst's staff at his alma mater as defensive backs coach. In his year off between retiring from the NFL and being named DB coach for the Badgers, Leonhard spent his time studying college film with then-Wisconsin Defensive Coordinator Dave Aranda and familiarizing himself with schemes that exist in college football that aren't prevalent in the NFL, such as the zone-read option offense. Prior to UW DB coach Daronte Jones leaving UW for an assistant coaching position with the Dolphins, Leonhard had been asking Paul Chryst about joining the Badgers staff.

In February 2017, Leonhard was named the new defensive coordinator of the Badgers, replacing Justin Wilcox, who became the new head coach of California. In late November 2017, Leonhard was named one of five finalists for the Broyles Award which recognized the top assistant coach in college football.

On October 2, 2022, Leonhard was named interim head coach of the Badgers following the firing of Paul Chryst.

After Wisconsin hired Luke Fickell as head coach in November 2022, Leonhard announced that he would be leaving Wisconsin at the end of the 2022 football season.

=== Illinois ===
On July 25, 2023, Illinois announced they had hired Leonhard as a senior football analyst.

=== Denver Broncos ===
On February 14, 2024, Leonhard was named as defensive backs coach and pass game coordinator for the Denver Broncos.

On March 6, 2025, Leonhard was promoted to assistant head coach, while remaining the defensive pass game coordinator.

=== Buffalo Bills ===
On January 31, 2026, Leonhard joined the Buffalo Bills as their defensive coordinator, under head coach Joe Brady.

== Head coaching record ==
=== College ===
Year	Team	Overall	Conference	Standing	Bowl/playoffs
**Wisconsin Badgers** (Big Ten Conference) (2022)
2022	Wisconsin	4–3 (Note: Served as interim head coach after Paul Chryst was fired after 5 games.)	4–3	5th (West)	
Wisconsin:		4–3	4–3		
Total:		4–3			
