= Winter, Wisconsin =

- Village
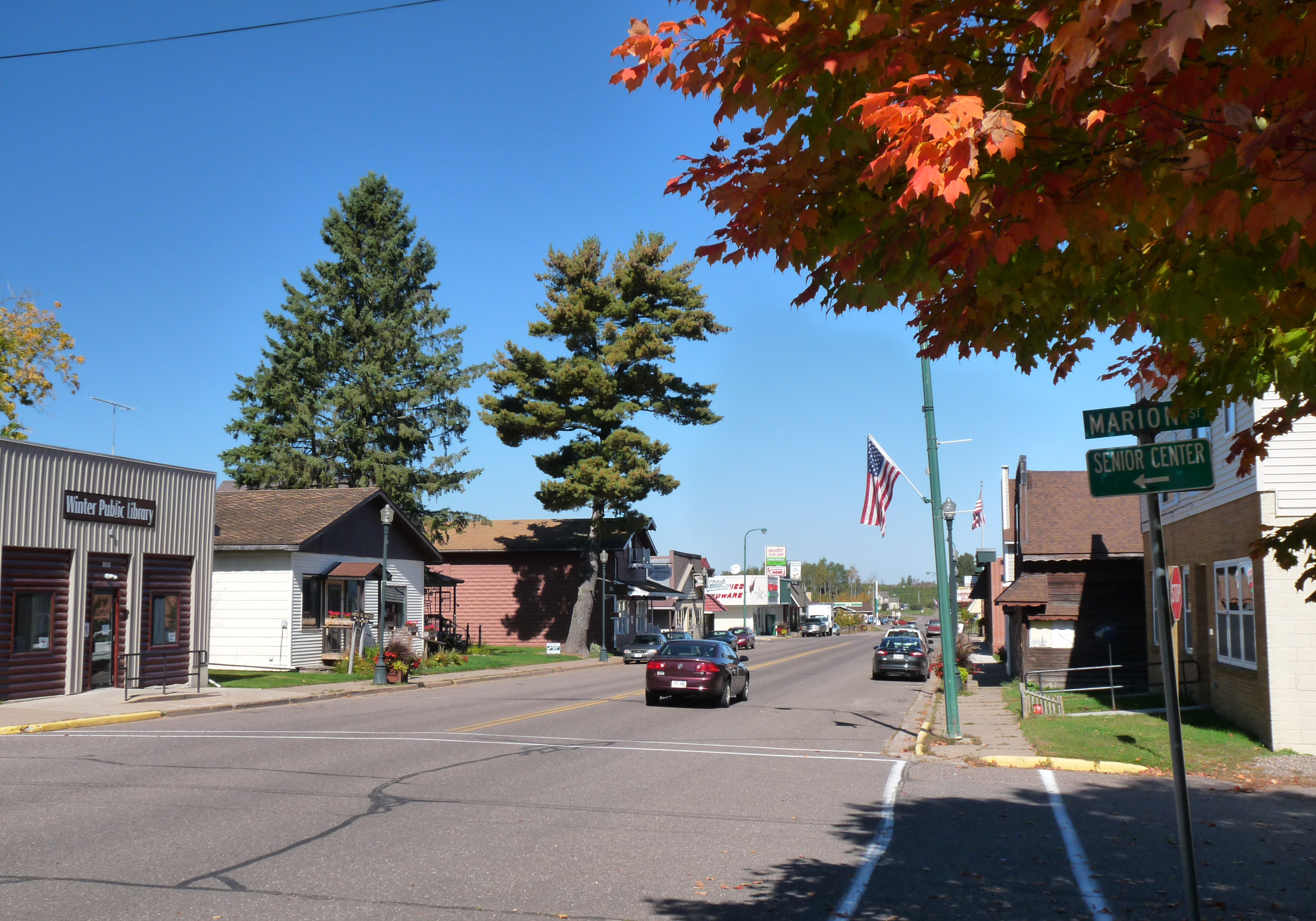
- Winter in autumn

- Location of Winter in Sawyer County, Wisconsin.
- Coordinates: 45°49′15″N 91°0′40″W
- Country: United States
- State: Wisconsin
- County: Sawyer

Area
  - Total: 0.79 sq mi (2.05 km^{2})
  - Land: 0.79 sq mi (2.05 km^{2})
  - Water: 0 sq mi (0.00 km^{2})
- Elevation: 1,401 ft (427 m)

Population (2020)
  - Total: 325
  - Density: 411/sq mi (159/km^{2})
- Time zone: UTC-6 (Central (CST))
  - Summer (DST): UTC-5 (CDT)
- Area codes: 715 & 534
- FIPS code: 55-88000
- GNIS feature ID: 1576887

Winter is a village in Sawyer County, Wisconsin, United States. The population was 325 at the 2020 census. The village is within the Town of Winter.

== History ==
Winter was founded in 1904. It was named for W. C. Winter, a railroad official. A post office has been in operation in Winter since 1904.

== Geography ==
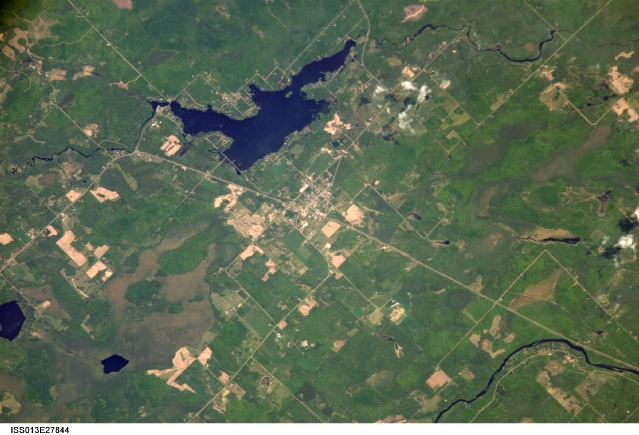
Winter from the International Space Station on May 28, 2006

Winter is located at 45°49′15″N 91°0′40″W (45.821014, -91.011118).

According to the United States Census Bureau, the village has a total area of 0.80 square miles (2.07 km^{2}), all land.

=== Climate ===
Climate data for Winter, Wisconsin, 1991–2020 normals, extremes 1915–2021
Month	Jan	Feb	Mar	Apr	May	Jun	Jul	Aug	Sep	Oct	Nov	Dec	Year
Record high °F (°C)	52 (11)	60 (16)	79 (26)	88 (31)	92 (33)	102 (39)	107 (42)	98 (37)	95 (35)	85 (29)	79 (26)	60 (16)	107 (42)
Mean maximum °F (°C)	39.0 (3.9)	46.3 (7.9)	60.3 (15.7)	74.4 (23.6)	83.3 (28.5)	87.4 (30.8)	88.1 (31.2)	87.6 (30.9)	83.4 (28.6)	75.1 (23.9)	58.0 (14.4)	43.0 (6.1)	90.3 (32.4)
Mean daily maximum °F (°C)	20.1 (−6.6)	25.6 (−3.6)	37.8 (3.2)	51.3 (10.7)	65.0 (18.3)	74.0 (23.3)	77.7 (25.4)	75.9 (24.4)	68.0 (20.0)	53.8 (12.1)	37.6 (3.1)	25.1 (−3.8)	51.0 (10.5)
Daily mean °F (°C)	10.9 (−11.7)	15.5 (−9.2)	27.7 (−2.4)	40.6 (4.8)	53.5 (11.9)	62.5 (16.9)	66.6 (19.2)	64.7 (18.2)	57.2 (14.0)	44.3 (6.8)	30.4 (−0.9)	17.3 (−8.2)	40.9 (4.9)
Mean daily minimum °F (°C)	1.6 (−16.9)	5.4 (−14.8)	17.6 (−8.0)	29.9 (−1.2)	41.9 (5.5)	51.1 (10.6)	55.4 (13.0)	53.6 (12.0)	46.4 (8.0)	34.9 (1.6)	23.2 (−4.9)	9.6 (−12.4)	30.9 (−0.6)
Mean minimum °F (°C)	−23.9 (−31.1)	−20.0 (−28.9)	−10.1 (−23.4)	13.5 (−10.3)	25.7 (−3.5)	35.6 (2.0)	43.2 (6.2)	40.2 (4.6)	28.5 (−1.9)	19.3 (−7.1)	2.5 (−16.4)	−16.8 (−27.1)	−27.0 (−32.8)
Record low °F (°C)	−52 (−47)	−46 (−43)	−40 (−40)	−7 (−22)	14 (−10)	24 (−4)	29 (−2)	28 (−2)	17 (−8)	1 (−17)	−27 (−33)	−45 (−43)	−52 (−47)
Average precipitation inches (mm)	1.02 (26)	1.10 (28)	1.71 (43)	3.04 (77)	3.78 (96)	5.00 (127)	4.30 (109)	3.99 (101)	4.46 (113)	3.67 (93)	1.78 (45)	1.32 (34)	35.17 (892)
Average snowfall inches (cm)	10.7 (27)	10.2 (26)	9.3 (24)	4.2 (11)	0.1 (0.25)	0.0 (0.0)	0.0 (0.0)	0.0 (0.0)	0.0 (0.0)	0.9 (2.3)	7.9 (20)	14.0 (36)	57.3 (146.55)
Average precipitation days (≥ 0.01 in)	9.2	7.0	8.1	10.8	11.5	12.3	11.2	10.2	10.8	11.1	8.9	9.8	120.9
Average snowy days (≥ 0.1 in)	9.1	6.5	4.4	2.4	0.0	0.0	0.0	0.0	0.0	0.8	5.0	9.0	37.2
Source 1: NOAA
Source 2: National Weather Service

== Demographics ==
Historical population
Census	Pop.	Note	%±
1980	376		—
1990	383		1.9%
2000	344		−10.2%
2010	313		−9.0%
2020	325		3.8%
U.S. Decennial Census

=== 2010 census ===
At the 2010 census there were 313 people, 153 households, and 75 families living in the village. The population density was 391.3 inhabitants per square mile (151.1/km^{2}). There were 209 housing units at an average density of 261.3 per square mile (100.9/km^{2}). The racial makup of the village was 91.7% White, 1.3% African American, 1.3% Native American, 0.3% Asian, 1.0% from other races, and 4.5% from two or more races. Hispanic or Latino of any race were 5.1%.

Of the 153 households 26.8% had children under the age of 18 living with them, 29.4% were married couples living together, 12.4% had a female householder with no husband present, 7.2% had a male householder with no wife present, and 51.0% were non-families. 43.1% of households were one person and 22.3% were one person aged 65 or older. The average household size was 2.05 and the average family size was 2.87.

The median age in the village was 41.6 years. 25.6% of residents were under the age of 18; 5.5% were between the ages of 18 and 24; 22.7% were from 25 to 44; 25.2% were from 45 to 64; and 21.1% were 65 or older. The gender makeup of the village was 51.4% male and 48.6% female.

=== 2000 census ===
At the 2000 census there were 344 people, 164 households, and 83 families living in the village. The 2010 Census revealed the population to be 233 - a nearly 1/3 decline since 2000. The population density was 430.9 people per square mile (166.0/km^{2}). There were 200 housing units at an average density of 250.5 per square mile (96.5/km^{2}). The racial makup of the village was 96.51% White, 0.58% Black or African American, 2.03% Native American, 0.29% from other races, and 0.58% from two or more races. 1.45%. were Hispanic or Latino of any race.

Of the 164 households 26.8% had children under the age of 18 living with them, 37.2% were married couples living together, 10.4% had a female householder with no husband present, and 48.8% were non-families. 44.5% of households were one person and 23.2% were one person aged 65 or older. The average household size was 2.10 and the average family size was 2.92.

The age distribution was 24.1% under the age of 18, 6.7% from 18 to 24, 24.7% from 25 to 44, 20.9% from 45 to 64, and 23.5% 65 or older. The median age was 40 years. For every 100 females, there were 111.0 males. For every 100 females age 18 and over, there were 102.3 males.

The median household income was $22,955 and the median family income was $25,625. Males had a median income of $23,333 versus $15,000 for females. The per capita income for the village was $15,404. About 13.2% of families and 17.5% of the population were below the poverty line, including 15.4% of those under age 18 and 25.0% of those age 65 or over.

== Notable person ==
- Jeffrey Williams, astronaut, was raised in Winter
