= 2005 Indiana Hoosiers football team =

American college football season

2005 Indiana Hoosiers football
- Conference: Big Ten Conference
- Record: 4–7 (1–7 Big Ten)
- Head coach: Terry Hoeppner (1st season)
- Offensive coordinator: Bill Lynch (1st season)
- Co-defensive coordinators: Brian George (1st season); Joe Palcic (1st season)
- MVP: Kyle Killion
- Captains: Adam Hines; Will Lumpkin; John Pannozzo; Chris Taylor
- Home stadium: Memorial Stadium

2005 Big Ten Conference football standings
	Conf.			Overall
Team	W		L	W		L
No. 3 Penn State $+	7	–	1	11	–	1
No. 4 Ohio State %+	7	–	1	10	–	2
No. 15 Wisconsin	5	–	3	10	–	3
Michigan	5	–	3	7	–	5
Northwestern	5	–	3	7	–	5
Iowa	5	–	3	7	–	5
Minnesota	4	–	4	7	–	5
Purdue	3	–	5	5	–	6
Michigan State	2	–	6	5	–	6
Indiana	1	–	7	4	–	7
Illinois	0	–	8	2	–	9
$ – BCS representative as conference champion; % – BCS at-large representative; + – Conference co-champions; Rankings from AP Poll

The 2005 Indiana Hoosiers football team represented Indiana University Bloomington during the 2005 NCAA Division I-A football season. They participated as members of the Big Ten Conference. The Hoosiers played their home games at Memorial Stadium in Bloomington, Indiana. The Hoosiers were coached by Terry Hoeppner, who was in his first season.

This was also the last season the Hoosiers started games at different local times with other teams in the Eastern Time Zone, as the State of Indiana began observing Daylight Saving Time in 2006.

== Schedule ==
Date	Time	Opponent	Site	TV	Result	Attendance
September 3	7:30 pm	at Central Michigan*	Kelly/Shorts Stadium; Mount Pleasant, MI		W 20–13	22,212
September 10	5:00 pm	Nicholls State*	Memorial Stadium; Bloomington, IN		W 35–31	27,600
September 17	6:45 pm	Kentucky*	Memorial Stadium; Bloomington, IN (rivalry)	ESPNC	W 38–14	40,240
October 1	12:00 pm	at No. 17 Wisconsin	Camp Randall Stadium; Madison, WI	ESPN2	L 24–41	82,330
October 8	12:00 pm	Illinois^{†}	Memorial Stadium; Bloomington, IN (rivalry)	ESPNU	W 36–13	35,829
October 15	12:00 pm	at Iowa	Kinnick Stadium; Iowa City, IA	ESPNU	L 21–38	70,585
October 22	12:00 pm	No. 13 Ohio State	Memorial Stadium; Bloomington, IN	ESPN	L 10–41	52,866
October 29	12:00 pm	at Michigan State	Spartan Stadium; East Lansing, MI (rivalry)	ESPN Plus	L 15–46	74,063
November 5	12:00 pm	Minnesota	Memorial Stadium; Bloomington, IN	ESPN2	L 21–42	30,656
November 12	12:00 pm	at No. 22 Michigan	Michigan Stadium; Ann Arbor, MI	ESPN2	L 14–41	110,580
November 19	1:00 pm	Purdue	Memorial Stadium; Bloomington, IN (Old Oaken Bucket)	ESPN360	L 14–41	50,023
*Non-conference game; ^{†}Homecoming; Rankings from Coaches' Poll released prior to the game; All times are in Eastern time

== Roster ==
2005 Indiana Hoosiers football team roster
Players
Coaches
Offense

Pos.	#	Name	Class
WR	1	Jahkeen Gilmore	Sr
WR	82	James Hardy	So
WR	81	Rhett Kleinschmidt	Sr
QB	12	Graeme McFarland	Jr
G	61	Isaac Sowells	Sr
RB	30	Chris Taylor	Sr
RB	2	Marcus Thigpen	So

Defense

Pos.	#	Name	Class
DE	94	Victor Adeyanju	Sr
DE	99	Ben Ishola	Jr
LB	43	Kyle Killion	Sr
CB	8	Buster Larkins	Sr
CB	9	Tracy Porter	So

Special teams

Pos.	#	Name	Class

Head coach

- Terry Hoeppner

Coordinators/assistant coaches

Legend

- (C) Team captain
- (S) Suspended
- (I) Ineligible
- Injured
- Redshirt

== 2006 NFL draftees ==
Player	Round	Pick	Position	NFL club
Isaac Sowells	4	112	Guard	Cleveland Browns
Victor Adeyanju	4	113	Defensive end	St. Louis Rams
