= 2005 Big Ten Conference football season =

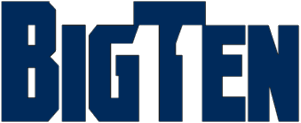
- League: NCAA Division I-A
- Sport: football
- Duration: September, 2005 through January, 2006
- Teams: 11
- TV partner(s): ABC, ESPN, ESPN2

2006 NFL Draft
- Top draft pick: A. J. Hawk (Ohio State)
- Picked by: Green Bay Packers, first round (5th overall)

Regular Season
- Co-Champions: Penn State; Ohio State
- Season MVP: Michael Robinson (Penn State); A. J. Hawk (Ohio State)

Football seasons
- ← 2004 2006 →

2005 Big Ten Conference football standings
	Conf.			Overall
Team	W		L	W		L
No. 3 Penn State $+	7	–	1	11	–	1
No. 4 Ohio State %+	7	–	1	10	–	2
No. 15 Wisconsin	5	–	3	10	–	3
Michigan	5	–	3	7	–	5
Northwestern	5	–	3	7	–	5
Iowa	5	–	3	7	–	5
Minnesota	4	–	4	7	–	5
Purdue	3	–	5	5	–	6
Michigan State	2	–	6	5	–	6
Indiana	1	–	7	4	–	7
Illinois	0	–	8	2	–	9
$ – BCS representative as conference champion; % – BCS at-large representative; + – Conference co-champions; Rankings from AP Poll

The 2005 Big Ten Conference football season was the 110th season for the Big Ten Conference.

== Bowl games ==
Date	Bowl Game	Big Ten Team	Opp. Team	Score
Dec. 28, 2005	Alamo Bowl	Michigan	Nebraska	32-28
Dec. 30, 2005	Music Bowl	Minnesota	Virginia	34-31
Dec. 30, 2005	Sun Bowl	Northwestern	UCLA	50-38
Jan. 2, 2006	Outback Bowl	Iowa	Florida	31-24
Jan. 2, 2006	Capital One Bowl	Wisconsin	Auburn	24-10
Jan. 2, 2006	Fiesta Bowl	Ohio State	Notre Dame	34-20
Jan. 3, 2006	Orange Bowl	Penn State	Florida State	26-23(3OT)
Bowl scores sourced from Sports-Reference.com

== See also ==
- 2005 All-Big Ten Conference football team
