= 2005 Iowa Hawkeyes football team =

American college football season

2005 Iowa Hawkeyes football

Outback Bowl, L 24–31 vs. Florida
- Conference: Big Ten Conference
- Record: 7–5 (5–3 Big Ten)
- Head coach: Kirk Ferentz (7th season)
- Offensive coordinator: Ken O'Keefe (7th season)
- Offensive scheme: Pro-style
- Defensive coordinator: Norm Parker (7th season)
- Base defense: 4–3
- Home stadium: Kinnick Stadium (Capacity: 70,585)

2005 Big Ten Conference football standings
	Conf.			Overall
Team	W		L	W		L
No. 3 Penn State $+	7	–	1	11	–	1
No. 4 Ohio State %+	7	–	1	10	–	2
No. 15 Wisconsin	5	–	3	10	–	3
Michigan	5	–	3	7	–	5
Northwestern	5	–	3	7	–	5
Iowa	5	–	3	7	–	5
Minnesota	4	–	4	7	–	5
Purdue	3	–	5	5	–	6
Michigan State	2	–	6	5	–	6
Indiana	1	–	7	4	–	7
Illinois	0	–	8	2	–	9
$ – BCS representative as conference champion; % – BCS at-large representative; + – Conference co-champions; Rankings from AP Poll

The 2005 Iowa Hawkeyes football team represented the University of Iowa during the 2005 NCAA Division I-A football season. The Hawkeyes played their home games at Kinnick Stadium in Iowa City, Iowa and were coached by Kirk Ferentz.

Iowa finished the season 7–5, including a record of 5–3 in the Big Ten Conference. Despite an up-and-down season, the Hawkeyes were invited to a January bowl game in Florida for the fourth consecutive year.

== Preseason ==
After three consecutive seasons with at least 10 wins and co-Big Ten championships in 2002 and 2004, expectations were high. A thrilling last second victory over LSU in the Capital One Bowl capped a 10-2 campaign with eight consecutive victories. With the return of first-team All-Big Ten quarterback Drew Tate, and first-team All-Big Ten linebackers Abdul Hodge and Chad Greenway (a preseason All-American) anchoring the defense, the Hawkeyes were considered national title contenders by some publications. Indeed, the presence of a running game (the Hawkeyes ranked 115th nationally in rushing in 2004 due to injuries) was thought to make Iowa even stronger. The Hawkeyes entered the season ranked 11th in the AP Poll (10th in the Coaches' Poll), their highest preseason ranking in two decades.

== Schedule ==
Date	Time	Opponent	Rank	Site	TV	Result	Attendance
September 3	11:00 am	Ball State*	No. 11	Kinnick Stadium; Iowa City, IA	ESPN+	W 56–0	70,585
September 10	2:30 pm	at Iowa State*	No. 8	Jack Trice Stadium; Ames, IA (Battle for the Cy-Hawk Trophy)	ABC	L 3–23	54,290
September 17	2:30 pm	No. 9 (I-AA) Northern Iowa*	No. 22	Kinnick Stadium; Iowa City, IA	ESPN+	W 45–21	70,585
September 24	11:00 am	at No. 8 Ohio State	No. 21	Ohio Stadium; Columbus, OH	ABC	L 6–31	105,225
October 1	11:00 am	Illinois^{†}		Kinnick Stadium; Iowa City, IA	ESPN+	W 35–7	70,585
October 8	3:30 pm	at Purdue		Ross–Ade Stadium; West Lafayette, IN	ESPN	W 34–17	64,785
October 15	11:00 am	Indiana		Kinnick Stadium; Iowa City, IA	ESPNU	W 38–21	70,585
October 22	11:00 am	Michigan		Kinnick Stadium; Iowa City, IA	ABC	L 20–23 ^{OT}	70,585
November 5	11:00 am	at Northwestern		Ryan Field; Evanston, IL	ESPN	L 27–28	34,550
November 12	2:30 pm	at No. 19 Wisconsin		Camp Randall Stadium; Madison, WI (Battle for the Heartland Trophy)	ESPN	W 20–10	83,184
November 19	11:00 am	Minnesota		Kinnick Stadium; Iowa City, IA (Battle for the Floyd of Rosedale)	ESPN2	W 52–28	70,585
January 2	10:00 am	vs. No. 16 Florida*	No. 25	Raymond James Stadium; Tampa, FL (Outback Bowl)	ESPN	L 24–31	65,881
*Non-conference game; ^{†}Homecoming; Rankings from AP Poll released prior to the game; All times are in Central time

== Roster ==
Quarterbacks: 6 Christensen, Jake – freshman; 16 Manson, Jason – junior; 7 McCollom, Eric – sophomore; 5 Tate, Drew – junior; Running backs: 36 Bailey, Kalvin – freshman; 7 Brown, Dana – freshman; 48 Brownlee Sam – junior; 35 Busch, Tom – sophomore; 46 Davis, Champ – junior; 45 Greene, Shonn – freshman; 23 Schnoor, Marcus – senior; 33 Simmons, Marques – senior; 28 Sims, Damian – sophomore; 21 Young, Albert – sophomore; Wide receivers: 3 Aldrich, Chris – sophomore; 80 Brodell, Andy – (redshirt) freshman; 17 Christian, Kennon – sophomore; 22 Davis, Calvin – junior; 4 Grigsby, Herb – sophomore; 11 Hinkel, Ed – senior; 84 Melloy, Matt – senior; 88 Solomon, Clinton – senior; 86 Stross, Trey – freshman; 11 Wilson, Marcus – freshman; Tight ends: 87 Chandler, Scott – junior; 49 Follett, Mike – freshman; 30 Majerus, Ryan – junior; 81 Moeaki, Tony – freshman; 83 Myers, Brandon – (redshirt) freshman; Offensive line: 55 Aumaitre, Nyere – freshman; 59 Cronin, Ben – senior; 74 Doering, Dan – freshman; 79 Dollmeyer, Greg – junior; 56 Dunn, Rashad – freshman; 54 Elgin, Mike – junior; 61 Ferentz, Brian – senior; 75 Gates, Ben – senior; 70 Gray, Lee – senior; 77 Huntrods, Clint – sophomore; 76 Jones, Mike – junior; 71 Olsen, Seth – freshman; 78 Richardson, Dace – freshman; 73 Yanda, Marshal – junior	Defensive line: 66 Bain, Ryan – freshman; 95 Bentler, Ted – freshman; 98 Blum, Tyler – freshman; 97 Cox, Lucas – freshman; 72 Eshareturi, George – sophomore; 38 Ewen, Ettore – freshman; 92 Iwebema Jr., Kenny – sophomore; 96 Kanellis, Alex – freshman; 47 King, Mitch – freshman; 53 Kroul, Matt – freshman; 99 Mattison, Bryan – sophomore; 65 Willcox, Alex – freshman; Linebackers: 43 Angerer, Pat – freshman; 5 Bergen, Tyler – sophomore; 39 Brevi, Chris – sophomore; 46 Chinander, Bret – senior; 18 Greenway, Chad – senior; 52 Hodge, Abdul – senior; 44 Anderson, Mike – sophomore; 40 Klinkenborg, Mike – sophomore; 27 Miles, Edmond – junior; Defensive backs: 20 Allen, Antwan – senior; 2 Dalton, Harold – freshman; 14 Moylan, Devan – junior; 10 Edwards, Justin – freshman; 23 Fletcher, Bradley – freshman; 27 Williams, Anthony- Sophomore; 13 Godfrey, Charles – sophomore; 26 Johnson, Jovon – senior; 15 Merrick, Miguel – junior; 25 Paschal, Marcus – junior; 9 Price, Khaliq – junior; 19 Shada, Adam – sophomore; 3 Dawkins, Ma'Quan – junior	Kickers: 1 Schlicher, Kyle – junior; Punters: 6 Fenstermaker, Andy – junior

== Coaching staff ==
Name	Position	Years at Iowa
Kirk Ferentz	Head coach	Six Years
Ken O'Keefe	Offensive Coordinator and Quarterbacks	Six Years
Norm Parker	Defensive Coordinator and Linebackers	Six Years
Chris Doyle	Strength and Conditioning	Six Years
Lester Erb	Receivers and Special Teams	Five Years
Carl Jackson	Running Backs	Six Years
Reese Morgan	Recruiting and Tight Ends	Five Years
Ron Aiken	Defensive Line	Six Years
Phil Parker	Defensive Backs	Six Years
Darrell Wilson	Linebackers and Special Teams	Five Years

== Rankings ==
Ranking movements Legend: ██ Increase in ranking ██ Decrease in ranking — = Not ranked RV = Received votes
	Week															
Poll	Pre	1	2	3	4	5	6	7	8	9	10	11	12	13	14	Final
AP	11	8	22	21	RV	RV	RV	RV	RV	RV	RV	RV	RV	25	25	RV
Coaches	10	8	21	21	RV	—	RV	RV	—	RV	—	RV	RV	25	25	RV
Harris	Not released				RV	RV	RV	RV	RV	RV	—	RV	RV	25	25	Not released
BCS	Not released							—	—	—	—	—	—	—	—	Not released

== Game summaries ==
=== Ball State ===
Ball State at Iowa

Team	1	2	3	4	Total
Cardinals	0	0	0	0	0
• No. 11 Hawkeyes	28	21	0	7	56

- Date: September 3
- Location: Kinnick Stadium, Iowa City, IA
- Game start: 11:10 a.m. CDT
- Elapsed time: 2:50
- Game attendance: 70,585
- Game weather: 79 °F (26 °C), Sunny, Wind ESE 4 mph (6.4 km/h)
- Referee: Dan Capron
- TV announcers (ESPN+): Larry Morgan, Marv Cook
- Source: Box Score

Scoring summary
1	10:59	Iowa	M. Schnoor 1-yard run (Schlicher kick)	Iowa 7–0
1	7:09	Iowa	A. Young 2-yard run (Schlicher kick)	Iowa 14-0
1	2:30	Iowa	J. Johnson 90-yard punt return (Schlicher kick)	Iowa 21-0
1	0:42	Iowa	C. Solomon 7-yard pass from D. Tate (Schlicher kick)	Iowa 28-0
2	12:33	Iowa	H. Grigsby 33-yard pass from D. Tate (Schlicher kick)	Iowa 35-0
2	8:10	Iowa	S. Brownlee 11-yard run (Schlicher kick)	Iowa 42-0
2	1:46	Iowa	S. Brownlee 1-yard run (Schlicher kick)	Iowa 49-0
4	14:19	Iowa	S. Greene 6-yard run (Schlicher kick)	Iowa 56-0

The Hawkeyes opened the much-anticipated 2005 season against a Cardinals team that had 13 players suspended for the game. This one was over early as the Hawks raced to a 28-0 lead after one quarter. Iowa extended the advantage to 49-0 by halftime and cruised from there. Dating back to last season, this was the 9th consecutive win for the Hawkeyes.

=== At Iowa State ===
Iowa at Iowa State

Team	1	2	3	4	Total
No. 8 Hawkeyes	0	0	3	0	3
• Cyclones	6	10	0	7	23

- Date: September 10
- Location: Jack Trice Stadium, Ames, IA
- Game start: 2:42 p.m. CDT
- Elapsed time: 3:22
- Game attendance: 54,290
- Game weather: 88 °F (31 °C), Mostly Clear, Wind S 20–25 mph (32–40 km/h)
- Referee: Dave Witvoet
- TV announcers (ABC): Mike Tirico, Tim Brant, Suzy Shuster
- Source: Box Score

Scoring summary
1	6:33	ISU	Flynn 12-yard pass from Meyer (Yelk kick no good)	ISU 6–0
2	4:12	ISU	Yelk 29-yard field goal	ISU 9-0
2	3:11	ISU	Hicks 28-yard interception return (Yelk kick)	ISU 16-0
3	10:44	Iowa	Schlicher 44-yard field goal	ISU 16-3
4	3:50	ISU	Kock 2-yard run (Yelk kick)	ISU 23-3

=== Northern Iowa ===
UNI at Iowa

Team	1	2	3	4	Total
Panthers	0	7	0	14	21
• No. 22 Hawkeyes	14	17	7	7	45

- Date: September 17
- Location: Kinnick Stadium, Iowa City, IA
- Game start: 2:40 p.m. CDT
- Elapsed time: 3:05
- Game attendance: 70,585
- Game weather: 81 °F (27 °C), Clearn and Sunny, Wind SE 5–10 mph (8.0–16.1 km/h)
- Referee: Todd Geerlings
- TV announcers (ESPN+): Larry Morgan, Marv Cook
- Source: Box Score

Scoring summary
1	12:04	Iowa	A. Young 10-yard run (Schlicher kick)	Iowa 7–0
1	7:04	Iowa	A. Young 1-yard run (Schlicher kick)	Iowa 14-0
2	11:51	Iowa	J. Johnson 18-yard interception return (Schlicher kick)	Iowa 21-0
2	8:10	UNI	Cutright 12-yard pass from E. Sanders (Wingert kick)	Iowa 21-7
2	3:03	Iowa	Schlicher 23-yard field goal	Iowa 24-7
2	1:03	Iowa	C. Solomon 11-yard pass from D. Tate (Schlicher kick)	Iowa 31-7
3	9:08	Iowa	C. Solomon 71-yard pass from D. Tate (Schlicher kick)	Iowa 38-7
4	12:44	UNI	Surrency 4-yard pass from E. Sanders (Schlicher kick)	Iowa 38-14
4	1:55	UNI	Horne 22-yard pass from E. Sanders (Schlicher kick)	Iowa 38-21
4	0:30	Iowa	D. Sims 39-yard run (Schlicher kick)	Iowa 45-21

The Panthers drove the ball effectively but it wasn't enough to overcome an early deficit.

=== At Ohio State ===
Iowa at Ohio State

Team	1	2	3	4	Total
No. 21 Hawkeyes	0	0	3	3	6
• No. 8 Buckeyes	7	10	7	7	31

- Date: September 24
- Location: Ohio Stadium, Columbus, OH
- Game start: 11:10 a.m. CDT
- Game attendance: 105,225
- Referee: Dennis Lipski
- TV announcers (ABC): Mike Tirico, Tim Brant, and Suzy Shuster
- Source: Box Score

Scoring summary
1	7:43	OSU	Anthony Gonzalez 8-yard pass from Troy Smith (Josh Huston kick)	OSU 7–0
2	14:30	OSU	Troy Smith 16-yard run (Josh Huston kick)	OSU 14-0
2	0:00	OSU	Josh Huston 47-yard field goal	OSU 17-0
3	9:59	OSU	Troy Smith 4-yard run (Josh Huston kick)	OSU 24-0
3	2:48	Iowa	Kyle Schlicher 52-yard field goal	OSU 24-3
4	11:48	Iowa	Kyle Schlicher 37-yard field goal	OSU 24-6
4	6:36	OSU	Anthony Gonzalez 29-yard pass from Troy Smith (Josh Huston kick)	OSU 31-6

=== Illinois ===
Illinois at Iowa

Team	1	2	3	4	Total
Fighting Illini	0	0	7	0	7
• Hawkeyes	14	0	14	7	35

- Date: October 1
- Location: Kinnick Stadium, Iowa City, IA
- Game start: 11:10 a.m. CDT
- Elapsed time: 3:00
- Game attendance: 70,585
- Game weather: 74 °F (23 °C), Mostly Sunny, Wind S 7 mph (11 km/h)
- Referee: Dan Capron
- TV announcers (ESPN+): Wayne Larrivee, Kelly Stouffer, Anne Marie Anderson
- Source: Box Score

Scoring summary
1	11:20	Iowa	M. Schnoor 3-yard run (Schlicher kick)	Iowa 7–0
1	6:26	Iowa	E. Hinkel 20-yard run (Schlicher kick)	Iowa 14-0
3	9:59	Iowa	E. Hinkel 10-yard pass from D. Tate (Schlicher kick)	Iowa 21-0
3	4:57	ILL	Halsey 1-yard pass from Brasic (Reda kick)	Iowa 21-7
3	0:18	Iowa	S. Chandler 7-yard pass from D. Tate (Schlicher kick)	Iowa 28-7
4	13:05	Iowa	D. Sims 66-yard run (Schlicher kick)	Iowa 35-7

Illinois was able to drive the ball but Iowa limited them to just one touchdown in this homecoming game. Albert Young was a force on the ground rushing for over 100 yards with nearly eight yards a carry. One of the most memorable plays of the contest came on the Hawkeyes second touchdown as Ed Hinkel took a reverse 20 yards in for a score, jumping over an Illinois defender in the process. Kenny Iwebema also blocked two Illini field goals in the first half.

=== At Purdue ===
Iowa at Purdue

Team	1	2	3	4	Total
• Hawkeyes	14	3	6	11	34
Boilermakers	7	7	3	0	17

- Date: October 8
- Location: Ross–Ade Stadium, West Lafayette, IN
- Game start: 2:36 p.m. CDT
- Elapsed time: 3:18
- Game attendance: 64,785
- Game weather: 55 °F (13 °C), Cloudy, Wind ENE 10 mph (16 km/h)
- Referee: Jim Lapetina
- TV announcers (ESPN): Mark Jones, Chris Spielman, Rob Stone
- Source: Box Score

Scoring summary
1	11:32	PUR	Sheets 15-yard run (Jones kick)	PUR 7–0
1	10:34	Iowa	C. Solomon 78-yard pass from D. Tate (Schlicher kick)	Tied 7-7
1	5:58	Iowa	R. Majerus 3-yard pass from D. Tate	Iowa 14-7
2	14:43	Iowa	Schlicher 33-yard field goal	Iowa 17-7
2	1:23	PUR	Bryant 24-yard pass from Kirsch (Jones kick)	Iowa 17-14
3	9:47	Iowa	Schlicher 31-yard field goal	Iowa 20-14
3	7:14	PUR	Jones 46-yard field goal	Iowa 20-17
3	3:37	Iowa	Schlicher 21-yard field goal	Iowa 23-17
4	6:26	Iowa	C. Solomon 36-yard pass from D. Tate (Schlicher kick failed)	Tied 29-17
4	6:10	Iowa	Team Safety	Iowa 31-17
4	3:10	Iowa	Schlicher 34-yard field goal	Iowa 34-17

Both Drew Tate and Clinton Solomon had career games in this blowout on the road. Tate had over 350 yards passing with Solomon compiling 166 of them as Purdue had no answer for him.

=== Indiana ===
Indiana at Iowa

Team	1	2	3	4	Total
Hoosiers	0	7	7	7	21
• Hawkeyes	14	3	7	14	38

- Date: October 15
- Location: Kinnick Stadium, Iowa City, IA
- Game start: 11:10 a.m. CDT
- Elapsed time: 3:35
- Game attendance: 70,585
- Game weather: 65 °F (18 °C), Clear and Sunny, Wind NW 5–10 mph (8.0–16.1 km/h)
- Referee: Todd Geerlings
- TV announcers (ESPN+): Craig Coshun, Randy Wright, Quint Kessenich
- Source: Box Score

Scoring summary
1	9:26	Iowa	M. Melloy 8-yard pass from D. Tate (Schlicher kick)	Iowa 7–0
1	1:48	Iowa	A. Young 31-yard run (Schlicher kick)	Iowa 14-0
2	4:13	IND	Powers 1-yard run (Kleinsmith kick)	Iowa 14-7
2	0:00	Iowa	Schlicher 35-yard field goal	Iowa 17-7
3	12:54	Iowa	C. Solomon 42-yard pass from D. Tate (Schlicher kick)	Iowa 24-7
3	5:11	IND	Hardy 1-yard pass from Powers (Kleinsmith kick)	Iowa 24-14
4	9:51	IND	Bailey 6-yard pass from Powers (Kleinsmith kick)	Iowa 24-21
4	8:02	Iowa	A. Young 26-yard run (Schlicher kick)	Iowa 31-21
4	4:18	Iowa	D. Sims 30-yard run (Schlicher kick)	Iowa 38-21

=== Michigan ===
Michigan at Iowa

Team	1	2	3	4	OT	Total
• Wolverines	0	7	3	7	6	23
Hawkeyes	7	7	0	3	3	20

- Date: October 22
- Location: Kinnick Stadium, Iowa City, IA
- Game start: 11:10 a.m. CDT
- Elapsed time: 3:20
- Game attendance: 70,585
- Game weather: 52 °F (11 °C), Clear, Wind NW 5–10 mph (8.0–16.1 km/h)
- Referee: Dave Witvoet
- TV announcers (ABC): Mike Tirico, Tim Brant, and Suzy Shuster
- Source: Box Score

Scoring summary
1	9:07	Iowa	H. Grigsby 13-yard pass from D. Tate (Schlicher kick)	Iowa 7–0
2	13:45	Mich	J. Avant 5-yard pass from Chad Henne (Rivas kick)	Tied 7-7
2	8:09	Iowa	H. Grigsby 4-yard pass from D. Tate (Schlicher kick)	Iowa 14–7
3	8:25	Mich	Rivas 26-yard field goal	Iowa 14-10
4	8:51	Mich	S. Breaston 52-yard pass from Chad Henne (Rivas kick)	Mich 17-14
4	0:00	Iowa	Schlicher 32-yard field goal	Tied 17-17
OT		Iowa	Schlicher 28-yard field goal	Iowa 20-17
OT		Mich	J. Jackson 1-yard run (Schlicher kick)	Mich 23-20

An overtime loss to the Wolverines snapped the Hawkeyes school-record 22-game winning streak at Kinnick Stadium.

=== At Northwestern ===
Iowa at Northwestern

Team	1	2	3	4	Total
Hawkeyes	14	10	0	3	27
• Wildcats	0	7	7	14	28

- Date: November 5
- Location: Ryan Field, Evanston, IL
- Game start: 11:02 a.m. CST
- Elapsed time: 2:26
- Game attendance: 34,550
- Game weather: 55 °F (13 °C), Overcast, Wind ENE 11 mph (18 km/h)
- Referee: Steve Newman
- TV announcers (ESPN): Dave Barnett, Chris Spielman, and Rob Stone
- Source: Box Score

Scoring summary
1	10:05	Iowa	A. Young 12-yard run (Schlicher kick)	Iowa 7–0
1	6:33	Iowa	A. Young 21-yard run (Schlicher kick)	Iowa 14-0
2	12:36	NW	Herbert 34-yard pass from Basanez	Iowa 14-7
2	9:56	Iowa	D. Tate 10-yard run (Schlicher kick)	Iowa 21-7
2	0:02	Iowa	Schlicher 19-yard field goal	Iowa 24-7
3	10:19	NW	Sutton 12-yard run (Howells kick)	Iowa 24-14
4	10:58	Iowa	Schlicher 32-yard field goal	Iowa 27-14
4	2:10	NW	Sutton 1-yard run (Howells kick)	Iowa 27-21
4	0:42	NW	Ross 9-yard pass from Basanez (Howells kick)	NW 28-27

Albert Young rushed for 202 yards and 2 touchdowns, but it wasn't enough for the Hawkeyes. After leading 24-7 at half and 27-14 after a Kyle Schlicher field goal with 10:58 remaining in the game, Iowa surrendered the lead and the game when the Wildcats scored a touchdown with 42 seconds left.

=== At Wisconsin ===
Iowa at Wisconsin

Team	1	2	3	4	Total
• Hawkeyes	0	3	14	3	20
No. 19 Badgers	10	0	0	0	10

- Date: November 12
- Location: Camp Randall Stadium, Madison, WI
- Game start: 2:35 p.m. CST
- Elapsed time: 3:10
- Game attendance: 83,184
- Game weather: 62 °F (17 °C), Cloudy and Rain, Wind S 15 mph (24 km/h)
- Referee: Dennis Lipski
- TV announcers (ESPN): Mark Jones, Chris Spielman, Erin Andrews
- Source: Box Score

Scoring summary
1	7:11	Wis	Williams 17-yard pass from Stocco (Mehlhaff kick)	Wis 7–0
1	0:47	Wis	Mehlhaff 24-yard field goal	Wis 10-0
2	11:00	Iowa	Schlicher 35-yard field goal	Wis 10-3
3	10:11	Iowa	C. Davis 6-yard pass from D. Tate (Schlicher kick)	Tied 10-10
3	1:11	Iowa	R. Majerus 13-yard pass from D. Tate	Iowa 17-10
4	9:21	Iowa	Schlicher 32-yard field goal	Iowa 20-10

In the final match-up of two former Hayden Fry assistant coaches, Kirk Ferentz prevailed to foil Barry Alvarez's home finale. Iowa's defense was smothering in this contest, holding the Badgers to their end of the field for the majority of the game.

=== Minnesota ===
Minnesota at Iowa

Team	1	2	3	4	Total
Golden Gophers	0	7	0	21	28
• Hawkeyes	14	24	7	7	52

- Date: November 19
- Location: Kinnick Stadium, Iowa City, IA
- Game start: 11:05 a.m. CST
- Elapsed time: 3:15
- Game attendance: 70,585
- Game weather: 46 °F (8 °C), Clear, Wind W 5–10 mph (8.0–16.1 km/h)
- Referee: Bill LeMonnier
- TV announcers (ESPN2): Pam Ward, David Norrie, Jimmy Dykes
- Source: Box Score

Scoring summary
1	9:30	Iowa	E. Hinkel 46-yard pass from D. Tate (Schlicher kick)	Iowa 7–0
1	4:08	Iowa	S. Chandler 6-yard pass from D. Tate (Schlicher kick)	Iowa 14-0
2	13:32	Iowa	D. Sims 71-yard run (Schlicher kick)	Iowa 21-0
2	6:46	Iowa	E. Hinkel 26-yard pass from C. Solomon (Schlicher kick)	Iowa 28-0
2	5:57	Iowa	A. Young 5-yard run (Schlicher kick)	Iowa 35-0
2	2:53	Minn	J. Shevlin 60-yard interception return (Giannini kick)	Iowa 35-7
2	0:08	Iowa	Schlicher 28-yard field goal	Iowa 38-7
3	4:41	Iowa	E. Hinkel 38-yard pass from D. Tate (Schlicher kick)	Iowa 45-7
4	11:29	Minn	Russell 16-yard run (Giannini kick)	Iowa 45-14
4	9:36	Iowa	E. Hinkel 3-yard pass from Drew Tate (Schlicher kick)	Iowa 52-14
4	7:44	Minn	Valentine 3-yard run (Monroe kick)	Iowa 52-21
4	1:34	Minn	Payne 3-yard pass from Cupito (Monroe kick)	Iowa 52-28

The Hawkeyes rolled to 613 yards of total offense in a blowout win on Senior Day. Iowa raced to a 35-0 lead and never looked back in retaining Floyd of Rosedale. Running backs Damian Sims and Albert Young both rushed for more than 100 yards. Wide receiver Ed Hinkel capped his home career in grand style with four touchdown receptions, tying a school record and setting the Kinnick Stadium record. He finished the game with 151 yards on seven receptions.

=== Vs. Florida (Outback Bowl) ===
Iowa vs. Florida

Team	1	2	3	4	Total
No. 25 Hawkeyes	0	7	0	17	24
• No. 16 Gators	7	17	7	0	31

- Date: January 2, 2006
- Location: Raymond James Stadium, Tampa, FL
- Game start: 11:03 a.m. CST
- Elapsed time: 3:45
- Game attendance: 65,881
- Game weather: 72 °F (22 °C), Cloudy, Wind S 13 mph (21 km/h)
- Referee: Barry Anderson
- TV announcers (ESPN): Mark Jones (play-by-play), Chris Spielman (analyst), and Rob Stone (sideline)
- Source: Box Score

Scoring summary
1	13:25	UF	McCollum 0-yard blocked punt return (Hetland kick)	UF 7–0
2	9:31	UF	Hetland 21-yard field goal	UF 10-0
2	1:57	UF	Brown 60-yard interception return	UF 17-0
2	1:10	Iowa	C. Solomon 20-yard pass from D. Tate (Schlicher kick)	UF 17-7
2	0:01	UF	Baker 24-yard pass from Leak	UF 24-7
3	5:23	UF	Baker 38-yard pass from Leak	UF 31-7
4	13:51	Iowa	E. Hinkel 4-yard pass from D. Tate	UF 31-14
4	6:59	Iowa	E. Hinkel 14-yard pass from D. Tate	UF 31-21
4	1:24	Iowa	Schlicher 45-yard field goal	UF 31-24

Despite allowing a blocked punt for a touchdown, an interception return for a touchdown, and an acrobatic catch for a touchdown with 0:01 before halftime, the Hawkeyes gave themselves a chance late in the game – one that ended in controversy. Iowa kicked a field goal with 1:24 left in the 4th quarter, which brought the game to a one possession lead by Florida. Iowa attempted an onside kick, and recovered the ball. However, flags were down, with the call being offsides against Iowa, giving the ball back to Florida. However, replays clearly showed no one offsides, even being pointed out by commentators. "Challenges" were not allowed in college football at this time, so Iowa had no way of arguing the questionable call.

== Postseason awards ==
- Chad Greenway - First-team All-American

== Team players in the 2006 NFL draft ==
Player	Position	Round	Pick	NFL club
Chad Greenway	Linebacker	1	17	Minnesota Vikings
Abdul Hodge	Linebacker	3	67	Green Bay Packers
