= 2005 Northwestern Wildcats football team =

American college football season

2005 Northwestern Wildcats football

Sun Bowl, L 38–50 vs. UCLA
- Conference: Big Ten Conference
- Record: 7–5 (5–3 Big Ten)
- Head coach: Randy Walker (7th season)
- Offensive coordinator: Mike Dunbar (4th season)
- Offensive scheme: Spread
- Defensive coordinator: Greg Colby (4th season)
- Base defense: 4–3
- Captains: Brett Basanez; Zach Strief; Barry Cofield; Tim McGarigle
- Home stadium: Ryan Field

2005 Big Ten Conference football standings
	Conf.			Overall
Team	W		L	W		L
No. 3 Penn State $+	7	–	1	11	–	1
No. 4 Ohio State %+	7	–	1	10	–	2
No. 15 Wisconsin	5	–	3	10	–	3
Michigan	5	–	3	7	–	5
Northwestern	5	–	3	7	–	5
Iowa	5	–	3	7	–	5
Minnesota	4	–	4	7	–	5
Purdue	3	–	5	5	–	6
Michigan State	2	–	6	5	–	6
Indiana	1	–	7	4	–	7
Illinois	0	–	8	2	–	9
$ – BCS representative as conference champion; % – BCS at-large representative; + – Conference co-champions; Rankings from AP Poll

The 2005 Northwestern Wildcats football team represented Northwestern University during the 2005 NCAA Division I-A football season. They played their home games at Ryan Field and participated as members of the Big Ten Conference. They were led by seventh-year head coach Randy Walker. The Wildcats finished tied for 3rd place in the Big Ten with a conference record of 5–3.

This would be Walker's last season as the Wildcats' coach, as he would die suddenly from a heart attack on June 29, 2006, at the age of 52. Linebackers coach/recruiting coordinator and Northwestern alum Pat Fitzgerald would be promoted to head coach on July 7, 2006.

== Schedule ==
Date	Time	Opponent	Rank	Site	TV	Result	Attendance
September 3	11:00 am	Ohio*		Ryan Field; Evanston, IL	ESPNU	W 38–14	20,115
September 10	3:00 pm	Northern Illinois*		Ryan Field; Evanston, IL	ESPNC	W 38–37	35,114
September 17	9:00 pm	at No. 18 Arizona State*		Sun Devil Stadium; Tempe, AZ		L 21–52	55,029
September 24	11:00 am	Penn State		Ryan Field; Evanston, IL	ESPN2	L 29–34	24,395
October 8	11:00 am	No. 14 Wisconsin		Ryan Field; Evanston, IL	ESPN	W 51–48	33,859
October 15	11:00 am	at Purdue		Ross–Ade Stadium; West Lafayette, IN	ESPN2	W 34–29	62,866
October 22	11:00 am	at No. 22 Michigan State		Spartan Stadium; East Lansing, MI	ESPN2	W 49–14	74,636
October 29	6:00 pm	No. 25 Michigan^{†}	No. 21	Ryan Field; Evanston, IL (rivalry)	ESPN	L 17–33	47,130
November 5	11:00 am	Iowa		Ryan Field; Evanston, IL	ESPN	W 28–27	34,550
November 12	11:00 am	at No. 10 Ohio State	No. 25	Ohio Stadium; Columbus, OH	ABC	L 7–48	105,181
November 19	11:00 am	at Illinois		Memorial Stadium; Champaign, IL (Sweet Sioux Tomahawk)	ESPN+	W 38–21	31,465
December 30	1:00 pm	vs. No. 17 UCLA*		Sun Bowl Stadium; El Paso, TX (Sun Bowl)	CBS	L 38–50	50,426
*Non-conference game; ^{†}Homecoming; Rankings from AP Poll released prior to the game; All times are in Central time

== Roster ==
2005 Northwestern Wildcats football team roster
Players
Coaches
Offense

Pos.	#	Name	Class
WR	1	Jonathan Fields	Sr
WR	3	Shaun Herbert	Jr
RB	4	Akeem Hunter	Fr
WR	7	Jeff Yarbrough	Fr
WR	8	Rasheed Ward	Fr
WR	9	Mark Philmore	Sr
WR	10	Eric Peterman	Fr
RB	11	Brandon Roberson	So
QB	12	Andrew Brewer	Fr
QB	13	Mike Kafka	Fr
QB	14	Brett Basanez	Sr
WR	17	Anthony Ward	Jr
QB	18	C. J. Bachér	Fr
RB	19	Tyrell Sutton	Fr
RB, WR	23	Gerard Hamlett	Fr
RB	26	Terrell Jordan	Sr
RB	29	Omar Conteh	Fr
WR	32	Sam Cheatham	So
FB	35	Mark Woodsum	Fr
TE	44	Erryn Cobb	Jr
TE, FB	49	Frayne Abernathy	So
OL	51	Joe Tripodi	Jr
OL	52	Joel Belding	Fr
OL	56	Ryan Keenan	Jr
OL	59	Alex Rucks	Fr
OL	60	Ramon Diaz	Fr
OL	62	Austin Matthews	So
OL	63	Zach Strief	Sr
OL	65	Thomas Bemenderfer	Fr
OL	68	Tyler Compton	Fr
OL	73	Fred McConnell	So
OL	74	Dylan Thiry	So
OL	75	Vince Clarke	Sr
OL	77	Adam Crum	So
OL	78	Kurt Mattes	Fr
WR	80	Kevin Mitchell	Fr
WR	81	Kevin Frymire	Fr
TE	83	Sean Mansfield	Sr
WR	84	Kim Thompson	So
WR	87	T. J. Jones	So
TE	88	Colin Kennedy	Fr
WR	89	Ross Lane	Fr

Defense

Pos.	#	Name	Class
CB	6	Cory Dious	Jr
CB	16	David Oredugba	Fr
CB	20	Marquice Cole	Jr
S	21	Bryan Heinz	Jr
CB	22	Deante Battle	So
S	24	Herschel Henderson	Jr
S	25	Frederic Tarver	Sr
S	27	Reggie McPherson	So
LB	31	Mike Dinard	Fr
S	34	André Butler	Fr
CB	35	Ryan Black	So
LB	36	Prince Kwateng	Fr
LB	37	Campbell Black	Jr
LB	38	Nick Roach	Jr
DB	39	Brendan Smith	Fr
LB	40	Eddie Simpson	So
LB	41	Tim McGarigle	Sr
LB	42	Demetrius Eaton	Jr
LB	43	Adam Kadela	So
S, LB	44	Todd Dockery	Fr
S	45	Ben Rothrauff	So
LB	46	Malcolm Arrington	Fr
CB	47	Chaz Richart	Fr
LB	48	Rejaie Johnson	Fr
CB	49	Tim Downing	Fr
LB	50	Chris Jeske	Fr
DL	53	Trevor Schultz	Jr
LB	55	Kyle Wagner	So
DL	57	Matt Clark	Fr
DE	58	Warren Anderson	So
DE	61	Dave Harper	Fr
DT	64	Ron Bardwell	Jr
DT	67	Barry Cofield	Sr
DT	70	John Gill	Fr
DL	71	Tanner Highlen	Fr
DL	72	David Ngene	So
DL	76	Desmond Taylor	Fr
DL	79	Adam Hahn	Fr
LB	86	Phil Brunner	Fr
DE	91	Mark Koehn	So
DL	92	Keegan Kennedy	Fr
DE	95	Kevin Mims	Fr
DE	99	Corey Wootton	Fr

Special teams

Pos.	#	Name	Class
PK	15	Slade Larscheid	Jr
PK	85	Michael Awadalla	Fr
P	90	Ryan Pederson	Sr
PK	93	Joel Howells	Jr
PK	96	Amado Villarreal	Fr
PK	97	Kyle Daley	Fr
LS	98	Chris Horton	Sr

Head coach

- Randy Walker

Coordinators/assistant coaches

- Jerry Brown
  Assistant head coach/Defensive backs
- Mike Dunbar
  Offensive coordinator
- Greg Colby
  Defensive coordinator
- Adam Cushing
  Tight ends/Fullbacks
- Pat Fitzgerald
  Linebackers/Recruiting coordinator
- Kevin Johns
  Running backs
- Garrick McGee
  Wide receivers
- James Patton
  Offensive line
- Eric Washington
  Defensive line

Legend

- (C) Team captain
- (S) Suspended
- (I) Ineligible
- Injured
- Redshirt

Roster

== Game summaries ==
=== Ohio ===
	1	2	3	4	Total
Bobcats	0	7	0	7	14
Wildcats	3	28	7	0	38

Statistics	OHIO	NU
First downs	13	28
Total yards	239	550
Rushing yards	62	194
Passing yards	177	356
Turnovers	3	3
Time of possession	20:58	39:02

Team	Category	Player	Statistics
Ohio	Passing	Austin Everson	10/26, 157 yards, INT
Ohio	Rushing	Kalvin McRae	10 rushes, 34 yards
Ohio	Receiving	Scott Mayle	4 receptions, 100 yards
Northwestern	Passing	Brett Basanez	27/37, 353 yards, 2 TD
Northwestern	Rushing	Tyrell Sutton	17 rushes, 104 yards, 2 TD
Northwestern	Receiving	Kim Thompson	5 receptions, 99 yards

=== Northern Illinois ===
	1	2	3	4	Total
Huskies	7	7	14	9	37
Wildcats	3	21	7	7	38

Statistics	NIU	NU
First downs	28	33
Total yards	539	502
Rushing yards	256	282
Passing yards	283	220
Turnovers	2	1
Time of possession	32:08	27:52

Team	Category	Player	Statistics
Northern Illinois	Passing	Phil Horvath	24/36, 283 yards, TD, INT
Northern Illinois	Rushing	Garrett Wolfe	34 rushes, 245 yards, 3 TD
Northern Illinois	Receiving	Sam Hurd	7 receptions, 90 yards, TD
Northwestern	Passing	Brett Basanez	21/32, 220 yards
Northwestern	Rushing	Tyrell Sutton	30 rushes, 214 yards, 4 TD
Northwestern	Receiving	Shaun Herbert	6 receptions, 73 yards

=== At No. 18 Arizona State ===
	1	2	3	4	Total
Wildcats	7	7	0	7	21
No. 18 Sun Devils	7	31	7	7	52

Statistics	NU	ASU
First downs	24	30
Total yards	416	773
Rushing yards	180	290
Passing yards	236	483
Turnovers	1	1
Time of possession	24:13	35:47

Team	Category	Player	Statistics
Northwestern	Passing	Brett Basanez	24/37, 224 yards, 2 TD
Northwestern	Rushing	Tyrell Sutton	15 rushes, 98 yards
Northwestern	Receiving	Ross Lane	4 receptions, 73 yards
Arizona State	Passing	Sam Keller	20/31, 409 yards, 4 TD
Arizona State	Rushing	Keegan Herring	23 rushes, 197 yards, 2 TD
Arizona State	Receiving	Matt Miller	3 receptions, 103 yards, TD

=== Penn State ===
	1	2	3	4	Total
Nittany Lions	0	14	3	17	34
Wildcats	10	13	0	6	29

Statistics	PSU	NU
First downs	21	24
Total yards	480	427
Rushing yards	209	198
Passing yards	271	229
Turnovers	4	1
Time of possession	20:01	39:59

Team	Category	Player	Statistics
Penn State	Passing	Michael Robinson	17/36, 271 yards, 3 TD, 3 INT
Penn State	Rushing	Tony Hunt	13 rushes, 99 yards
Penn State	Receiving	Jordan Norwood	5 receptions, 83 yards
Northwestern	Passing	Brett Basanez	20/38, 229 yards, INT
Northwestern	Rushing	Tyrell Sutton	32 rushes, 112 yards, 2 TD
Northwestern	Receiving	Jonathan Fields	4 receptions, 70 yards

=== No. 14 Wisconsin ===
Team	1	2	3	4	Total
No. 14 Badgers	7	10	10	21	48
• Wildcats	0	10	27	14	51

- Date: October 8
- Location: Ryan Field, Evanston, IL
- Game start: 11:00 a.m. CST
- Elapsed time: 3:47
- Game attendance: 33,859
- Game weather: Overcast; 54 °F (12 °C); wind 17 mph (27 km/h) NE
- Referee: Dan Capron
- TV announcers (ESPN2): Pam Ward (Play-by-play), David Norrie (Color) & Jimmy Dykes (Sideline)

Scoring summary
Q1	8:47	WIS	Orr 15 yard pass from Stocco (Mehlhaff kick)	WIS 7–0
Q2	12:25	NW	Basanez 4 yard run (Howells kick)	Tie 7–7
Q2	6:36	WIS	Stanley 5 yard run (Mehlhaff kick)	WIS 14–7
Q2	1:59	WIS	Mehlhaff 27 yard field goal	WIS 17–7
Q2	0:04	NW	Howells 21 yard field goal	WIS 17–10
Q3	12:43	NW	Philmore 4 yard pass from Basanez (kick blocked)	WIS 17–16
Q3	5:52	NW	Sutton 1 yard run (Howells kick)	NW 23–17
Q3	3:34	WIS	Mehlhaff 46 yard field goal	NW 23–20
Q3	2:22	NW	Thompson 52 yard pass from Basanez (Howells kick)	NW 30–20
Q3	1:15	WIS	Calhoun 1 yard run (Mehlhaff kick)	NW 30–27
Q3	0:47	NW	Sutton 14 yard run (Howells kick)	NW 37–27
Q4	14:13	WIS	Orr 9 yard pass from Stocco (Mehlhaff kick)	NW 37–34
Q4	9:44	NW	Sutton 9 yard pass from Basanez (Howells kick)	NW 44–34
Q4	4:22	NW	Sutton 62 yard run (Howells kick)	NW 51–34
Q4	3:53	WIS	Orr 13 yard pass from Stocco (Mehlhaff kick)	NW 51–41
Q4	2:48	WIS	Orr 21 yard pass from Stocco (Mehlhaff kick)	NW 51–48

Statistics	WIS	NU
First downs	27	28
Total yards	515	674
Rushing yards	189	313
Passing yards	326	361
Turnovers	2	2
Time of possession	30:36	29:24

Team	Category	Player	Statistics
Wisconsin	Passing	John Stocco	24/31, 326 yards, 4 TD, 2 INT
Wisconsin	Rushing	Brian Calhoun	23 rushes, 122 yards, TD
Wisconsin	Receiving	Brian Calhoun	11 receptions, 128 yards
Northwestern	Passing	Brett Basanez	26/36, 361 yards, 3 TD
Northwestern	Rushing	Tyrell Sutton	29 rushes, 244 yards, 3 TD
Northwestern	Receiving	Mark Philmore	6 receptions, 97 yards, TD

=== At Purdue ===
	1	2	3	4	Total
Wildcats	14	14	0	6	34
Boilermakers	3	6	14	6	29

Statistics	NU	PUR
First downs	32	30
Total yards	603	505
Rushing yards	128	127
Passing yards	475	378
Turnovers	1	4
Time of possession	27:50	32:10

Team	Category	Player	Statistics
Northwestern	Passing	Brett Basanez	37/55, 463 yards, 3 TD
Northwestern	Rushing	Tyrell Sutton	13 rushes, 89 yards, TD
Northwestern	Receiving	Shaun Herbert	11 receptions, 96 yards
Purdue	Passing	Brandon Kirsch	37/58, 360 yards, 2 INT
Purdue	Rushing	Jerod Void	7 rushes, 37 yards, TD
Purdue	Receiving	Dorien Bryant	16 receptions, 153 yards

=== At No. 22 Michigan State ===
	1	2	3	4	Total
Wildcats	7	14	21	7	49
No. 22 Spartans	7	0	0	7	14

Statistics	NU	MSU
First downs	31	28
Total yards	533	480
Rushing yards	202	189
Passing yards	331	291
Turnovers	1	4
Time of possession	27:25	32:35

Team	Category	Player	Statistics
Northwestern	Passing	Brett Basanez	24/30, 331 yards, 2 TD
Northwestern	Rushing	Tyrell Sutton	21 rushes, 109 yards, 2 TD
Northwestern	Receiving	Shaun Herbert	10 receptions, 138 yards
Michigan State	Passing	Drew Stanton	20/38, 234 yards, TD, 3 INT
Michigan State	Rushing	Javon Ringer	18 rushes, 104 yards
Michigan State	Receiving	Kyle Brown	1 reception, 53 yards

=== No. 25 Michigan ===
	1	2	3	4	Total
No. 25 Wolverines	14	13	0	6	33
No. 21 Wildcats	7	10	0	0	17

Statistics	MICH	NU
First downs	22	18
Total yards	427	415
Rushing yards	253	89
Passing yards	174	326
Turnovers	4	3
Time of possession	38:01	21:59

Team	Category	Player	Statistics
Michigan	Passing	Chad Henne	17/30, 174 yards, TD, 3 INT
Michigan	Rushing	Jerome Jackson	24 rushes, 105 yards
Michigan	Receiving	Jason Avant	5 receptions, 67 yards
Northwestern	Passing	Brett Basanez	26/49, 326 yards, 2 TD, 2 INT
Northwestern	Rushing	Tyrell Sutton	10 rushes, 50 yards
Northwestern	Receiving	Mark Philmore	9 receptions, 139 yards, 2 TD

=== Iowa ===
	1	2	3	4	Total
Hawkeyes	14	10	0	3	27
Wildcats	0	7	7	14	28

Statistics	IOWA	NU
First downs	27	25
Total yards	492	453
Rushing yards	216	115
Passing yards	276	338
Turnovers	0	2
Time of possession	30:42	29:18

Team	Category	Player	Statistics
Iowa	Passing	Drew Tate	21/35, 273 yards
Iowa	Rushing	Albert Young	38 rushes, 202 yards, 2 TD
Iowa	Receiving	Herb Grigsby	7 receptions, 84 yards
Northwestern	Passing	Brett Basanez	31/51, 338 yards, 2 TD, 2 INT
Northwestern	Rushing	Tyrell Sutton	17 rushes, 65 yards, 2 TD
Northwestern	Receiving	Mark Philmore	10 receptions, 123 yards

=== At No. 10 Ohio State ===
	1	2	3	4	Total
No. 25 Wildcats	7	0	0	0	7
No. 10 Buckeyes	14	14	10	10	48

Statistics	NU	OSU
First downs	16	23
Total yards	251	422
Rushing yards	98	317
Passing yards	153	105
Turnovers	2	1
Time of possession	25:38	34:22

Team	Category	Player	Statistics
Northwestern	Passing	Brett Basanez	15/31, 121 yards, TD, INT
Northwestern	Rushing	Tyrell Sutton	14 rushes, 93 yards
Northwestern	Receiving	Jonathan Fields	4 receptions, 45 yards
Ohio State	Passing	Troy Smith	7/12, 77 yards, INT
Ohio State	Rushing	Antonio Pittman	18 rushes, 132 yards, TD
Ohio State	Receiving	Santonio Holmes	3 receptions, 49 yards

=== At Illinois ===
	1	2	3	4	Total
Wildcats	7	17	7	7	38
Fighting Illini	0	21	0	0	21

Statistics	NU	ILL
First downs	36	24
Total yards	596	440
Rushing yards	356	199
Passing yards	240	241
Turnovers	0	1
Time of possession	32:24	27:36

Team	Category	Player	Statistics
Northwestern	Passing	Brett Basanez	25/31, 240 yards, 2 TD
Northwestern	Rushing	Tyrell Sutton	34 rushes, 212 yards
Northwestern	Receiving	Mark Philmore	5 receptions, 62 yards, TD
Illinois	Passing	Tim Brasic	20/35, 241 yards, 2 TD, INT
Illinois	Rushing	Pierre Thomas	18 rushes, 97 yards, TD
Illinois	Receiving	Kendrick Jones	3 receptions, 95 yards

=== Vs. No. 17 UCLA (Sun Bowl) ===
	1	2	3	4	Total
Wildcats	22	0	3	13	38
No. 17 Bruins	7	22	7	14	50

Statistics	NU	UCLA
First downs	33	24
Total yards	584	453
Rushing yards	168	310
Passing yards	416	143
Turnovers	3	4
Time of possession	30:50	29:10

Team	Category	Player	Statistics
Northwestern	Passing	Brett Basanez	38/70, 416 yards, 2 TD, 2 INT
Northwestern	Rushing	Tyrell Sutton	18 rushes, 84 yards
Northwestern	Receiving	Ross Lane	7 receptions, 136 yards
UCLA	Passing	Drew Olson	10/24, 143 yards, 3 TD, 3 INT
UCLA	Rushing	Chris Markey	24 rushes, 161 yards
UCLA	Receiving	Ryan Moya	1 reception, 58 yards, TD

The Wildcats were invited to play in the 2005 Sun Bowl. They lost 38–50 to the UCLA Bruins, who staged a 22-point comeback, a record for the Bruins at the time.
