= 2005 Michigan Wolverines football team =

American college football season

2005 Michigan Wolverines football

Alamo Bowl, L 28–32 vs. Nebraska
- Conference: Big Ten Conference
- Record: 7–5 (5–3 Big Ten)
- Head coach: Lloyd Carr (11th season)
- Offensive coordinator: Terry Malone (4th season)
- Offensive scheme: Multiple
- Defensive coordinator: Jim Herrmann (9th season)
- Base defense: Multiple
- MVP: Jason Avant
- Captains: Jason Avant; Pat Massey
- Home stadium: Michigan Stadium

2005 Big Ten Conference football standings
	Conf.			Overall
Team	W		L	W		L
No. 3 Penn State $+	7	–	1	11	–	1
No. 4 Ohio State %+	7	–	1	10	–	2
No. 15 Wisconsin	5	–	3	10	–	3
Michigan	5	–	3	7	–	5
Northwestern	5	–	3	7	–	5
Iowa	5	–	3	7	–	5
Minnesota	4	–	4	7	–	5
Purdue	3	–	5	5	–	6
Michigan State	2	–	6	5	–	6
Indiana	1	–	7	4	–	7
Illinois	0	–	8	2	–	9
$ – BCS representative as conference champion; % – BCS at-large representative; + – Conference co-champions; Rankings from AP Poll

The 2005 Michigan Wolverines football team represented the University of Michigan in the 2005 NCAA Division I-A football season. The team's head coach was Lloyd Carr. The Wolverines played their home games at Michigan Stadium. That year Michigan Wolverines football competed in the Big Ten Conference in almost all intercollegiate sports including men's college football. Despite a disappointing 7–5 finish after being ranked as high as No. 3 early in the season, Michigan did not lose a game by more than a touchdown and upset Penn State, who finished #3 in the nation, on a last second touchdown pass from Chad Henne to Mario Manningham. The team earned an invitation to the 2005 Alamo Bowl, where it lost to the Nebraska Cornhuskers by a 32–28 margin. The team's first five conference games were all decided in the final 24 seconds of regulation or in overtime.

== Schedule ==
Date	Time	Opponent	Rank	Site	TV	Result	Attendance
September 3	3:30 p.m.	Northern Illinois*	No. 4	Michigan Stadium; Ann Arbor, MI	ABC	W 33–17	110,971
September 10	12:00 p.m.	No. 20 Notre Dame*	No. 3	Michigan Stadium; Ann Arbor, MI (rivalry)	ABC	L 10–17	111,386
September 17	12:00 p.m.	Eastern Michigan*	No. 14	Michigan Stadium; Ann Arbor, MI	ESPN Plus	W 55–0	109,511
September 24	6:00 p.m.	at Wisconsin	No. 14	Camp Randall Stadium; Madison, WI	ESPN2	L 20–23	83,022
October 1	12:00 p.m.	at No. 11 Michigan State		Spartan Stadium; East Lansing, MI (rivalry)	ABC	W 34–31 ^{OT}	79,401
October 8	1:00 p.m.	Minnesota^{†}	No. 21	Michigan Stadium; Ann Arbor, MI (Little Brown Jug)	ABC	L 20–23	111,117
October 15	3:30 p.m.	No. 8 Penn State		Michigan Stadium; Ann Arbor, MI (rivalry)	ABC	W 27–25	111,249
October 22	12:00 p.m.	at Iowa		Kinnick Stadium; Iowa City, IA	ABC	W 23–20 ^{OT}	70,585
October 29	7:00 p.m.	at No. 21 Northwestern	No. 25	Ryan Field; Evanston, IL (rivalry)	ESPN	W 33–17	47,130
November 12	12:00 p.m.	Indiana	No. 21	Michigan Stadium; Ann Arbor, MI	ESPN2	W 41–14	110,580
November 19	1:00 p.m.	No. 9 Ohio State	No. 17	Michigan Stadium; Ann Arbor, MI (The Game)	ABC	L 21–25	111,591
December 28	8:00 p.m.	vs. Nebraska*	No. 20	Alamodome; San Antonio, TX (Alamo Bowl)	ESPN	L 28–32	63,016
*Non-conference game; ^{†}Homecoming; Rankings from AP Poll released prior to the game; All times are in Eastern time

== Rankings ==
Ranking movements Legend: ██ Increase in ranking ██ Decrease in ranking — = Not ranked RV = Received votes
	Week															
Poll	Pre	1	2	3	4	5	6	7	8	9	10	11	12	13	14	Final
AP	4	3	14	14	RV	21	RV	RV	25	22	21	17	22	20	20	RV
Coaches	4	3	14	13	RV	24	RV	RV	RV	23	22	17	23	21	21	RV
Harris	Not released				25	21	RV	RV	RV	22	21	17	24	21	21	Not released
BCS	Not released							—	25	21	21	15	22	19	20	Not released

== Game summaries ==
=== Michigan State ===
Paul Bunyan Trophy: Michigan Wolverines (2–2) at #11 Michigan State Spartans (4–0)

Quarter	1	2	3	4	OT	Total
Michigan	14	10	0	7	3	34
Michigan St	7	14	3	7	0	31

at Spartan Stadium • East Lansing, Michigan

- Date: October 1
- Game time: 12:00 p.m. EDT
- Game attendance: 79,401
- Referee: Dennis Lipski
- TV announcers (ABC): Brent Musburger, Gary Danielson, and Jack Arute
- Michigan Football

Game information

Michigan

- Chad Henne
  26/35, 256 Yds, 3 TD, INT
- Mike Hart
  36 Rush, 218 Yds, TD
- Jason Avant
  10 Rec, 96 Yds, TD

Michigan State

- Drew Stanton
  20/30, 282 Yds, TD, INT
- Jason Teague
  8 Rush, 72 Yds
- Jerramy Scott
  3 Rec, 80 Yds

Scoring summary

Quarter	Time	Drive			Team	Scoring information	Score	
Quarter	Time	Plays	Yards	TOP	Team	Scoring information	MICH	MSU
1	8:23	10	98	3:40	Michigan	Jason Avant 2-yard touchdown reception from Chad Henne, Garrett Rivas kick good	7	0
1	7:03	2	52	0:15	Michigan	Mario Manningham 43-yard touchdown reception from Chad Henne, Garrett Rivas kick good	14	0
1	2:44	10	80	4:19	Michigan St	Drew Stanton 4-yard touchdown run, John Goss kick good	14	7
2	11:20	11	87	3:44	Michigan	Brian Thompson 5-yard touchdown reception from Chad Henne, Garrett Rivas kick good	21	7
2	5:53	12	78	5:21	Michigan St	Jehuu Caulcrick 1-yard touchdown run, John Goss kick good	21	14
2	3:30	2	67	0:49	Michigan St	Kerry Reed 61-yard touchdown reception from Drew Stanton, John Goss kick good	21	21
2	0:09	13	69	3:15	Michigan	20-yard field goal by Garrett Rivas	24	21
3	11:11	4	8	2:24	Michigan St	26-yard field goal by John Goss	24	24
4	11:29	5	80	2:09	Michigan	Mike Hart 1-yard touchdown run, Garrett Rivas kick good	31	24
4	6:43				Michigan St	Fumble recovery returned 74 yards for touchdown by Domata Peko, Kyle Mayer kick good	31	31
OT		3	7		Michigan	35-yard field goal by Garrett Rivas	34	31
"TOP" = time of possession. For other American football terms, see Glossary of American football.							34	31

=== Penn State ===
Penn State at Michigan

Team	1	2	3	4	Total
Penn State	0	0	3	22	25
• Michigan	0	3	7	17	27

- Date: October 15
- Location: Michigan Stadium, Ann Arbor, MI
- Game start: 3:30 p.m. EST
- TV announcers (ABC): Brad Nessler (Play-by-play), Bob Griese (Color), & Lynn Swann (Sideline)
- Source: ESPN

Scoring summary
2	MICH	4:34	Garrett Rivas 35-yard field goal	MICH 3-0
3	11:10	MICH	Mike Hart 2-yard run (Garrett Rivas kick)	MICH 10-0
3	:10	PSU	Kevin Kelly 25-yard field goal	MICH 10-3
4	11:56	PSU	Michael Robinson 4-yard run (Kevin Kelly kick)	Tied 10-10
4	11:39	PSU	Alan Zemaitis 35-yard fumble return (Kevin Kelly run)	PSU 18-10
4	9:32	MICH	Mario Manningham 33-yard pass from Chad Henne (Mike Hart run)	Tied 18-18
4	3:45	MICH	Garrett Rivas 47-yard field goal	MICH 21-18
4	:53	PSU	Michael Robinson 3-yard run (Kevin Kelly kick)	PSU 25-21
4	:00	MICH	Mario Manningham 10-yard pass from Chad Henne (no kick)	MICH 27-25

=== Iowa ===
Team	1	2	3	4	OT	Total
• Michigan	0	7	3	7	6	23
Iowa	7	7	0	3	3	20

- Date: October 22
- Location: Kinnick Stadium • Iowa City, IA
- Game start: 12:10 p.m. EST
- TV announcers (ABC): Mike Tirico (Play-by-play), Tim Brant (Color), & Suzy Shuster (Sideline)

Scoring summary
1	9:07	IOWA	Herb Grigsby 15-yard pass from Drew Tate (Kyle Schlicher kick)	Iowa 7-0
2	13:45	MICH	Jason Avant 5-yard pass from Chad Henne (Garrett Rivas kick)	Tie 7-7
2	8:09	IOWA	Herb Grigsby 4-yard pass from Drew Tate (Kyle Schlicher kick)	Iowa 14-7
3	8:25	MICH	Garrett Rivas 27-yard field goal	Iowa 14-10
4	8:51	MICH	Steve Breaston 52-yard pass from Chad Henne (Garrett Rivas kick)	Michigan 17-14
4	:00	IOWA	Kyle Schlicher 32-yard field goal	Tie 17-17
OT		IOWA	Kyle Schlicher 28-yard field goal	Iowa 20-17
OT		MICH	Jerome Jackson 1-yard run	Michigan 23-20

== Personnel ==
=== Coaching staff ===
- Head coach: Lloyd Carr
- Assistant coaches: Erik Campbell (assistant head coach), Mike DeBord, [Jim Herrmann] Ron English, Fred Jackson, Ron Lee, Scot Loeffler, Andy Moeller, Steve Stripling, Steve Szabo
- Trainer: Paul Schmidt

=== Roster ===
2005 Michigan Wolverines football team roster
Players
Coaches
Offense

Pos.	#	Name	Class
WR	16	Adrian Arrington	So
WR	8	Jason Avant	Sr
WR	18	Antonio Bass	Fr
WR	15	Steve Breaston	Sr
RB	3	Kevin Grady	Fr
QB	12	Matt Gutierrez	Sr
RB	20	Mike Hart	So
QB	7	Chad Henne	So
G	57	Adam Kraus	Jr
G	67	Matt Lentz	Sr
OT	77	Jake Long	Jr
WR	86	Mario Manningham	Fr
TE	88	Tim Massaquoi	Sr
G	60	David Moosman	Fr
OT	71	Mark Ortmann	Fr
OL	72	Rueben Riley	Sr
OT	79	Adam Stenavich	Sr

Defense

Pos.	#	Name	Class
S	22	Jamar Adams	So
DT	80	Alan Branch	So
LB	6	Prescott Burgess	Jr
LB	2	Shawn Crable	Jr
LB	37	Chris Graham	So
CB	29	Leon Hall	Jr
LB	45	David Harris	Sr
DE	90	Tim Jamison	So
CB	13	Grant Mason	Fr
S	21	Ryan Mundy	Jr
CB	25	Johnny Sears Jr.	Fr
DT	67	Terrance Taylor	Fr
CB	14	Morgan Trent	So
DT	78	Gabe Watson	Sr
DE	56	LaMarr Woodley	Jr
LB	99	Pierre Woods	Sr

Special teams

Pos.	#	Name	Class
P	41	Zoltán Meskó	Fr
K	38	Garrett Rivas	Jr

Head coach

- Lloyd Carr

Coordinators/assistant coaches

Legend

- (C) Team captain
- (S) Suspended
- (I) Ineligible
- Injured
- Redshirt

Roster

== Statistical achievements ==
The team led the conference in kick return average in all games (23.4), while Michigan State led in conference games. Mike Hart set the school record for career 200-yard games (4), passing Ron Johnson's 3 set in 1968. He extended the record, which is still standing, to 5 in 2007. His 200-yard game came after missing two and a half games due to injury. During the three injury-affected games Michigan lost to Notre Dame and Wisconsin and slipped out of the polls for the first time since 1998, snapping the nation's longest streak of 114-straight poll appearances.

== Awards and honors ==
- Co-captains: Jason Avant, Pat Massey
- Academic All-American: Avant (second team)
- All-Conference: Jason Avant, Matt Lentz, Adam Stenavich, Gabe Watson
- Most Valuable Player: Jason Avant
- Meyer Morton Award: Tim Massaquoi
- John Maulbetsch Award: Chad Henne
- Frederick Matthei Award: Leon Hall
- Arthur Robinson Scholarship Award: Paul Sarantos, David Schoonover
- Hugh Rader Jr. Award: Adam Stenavich
- Robert P. Ufer Award: Tim Massaquoi
- Roger Zatkoff Award: David Harris
- Dick Katcher Award: Alan Branch
