= 2005 Ohio State Buckeyes football team =

American college football season

2005 Ohio State Buckeyes football

Big Ten co-champion Fiesta Bowl champion

Fiesta Bowl, W 34–20 vs. Notre Dame
- Conference: Big Ten Conference

Ranking
- Coaches: No. 4
- AP: No. 4
- Record: 10–2 (7–1 Big Ten)
- Head coach: Jim Tressel (5th season)
- Offensive coordinator: Jim Bollman (5th season)
- Offensive scheme: Multiple
- Defensive coordinator: Jim Heacock (1st season)
- Co-defensive coordinator: Luke Fickell (1st season)
- Base defense: 4–3
- MVP: A. J. Hawk
- Captains: A. J. Hawk; Nick Mangold; Rob Sims
- Home stadium: Ohio Stadium

2005 Big Ten Conference football standings
	Conf.			Overall
Team	W		L	W		L
No. 3 Penn State $+	7	–	1	11	–	1
No. 4 Ohio State %+	7	–	1	10	–	2
No. 15 Wisconsin	5	–	3	10	–	3
Michigan	5	–	3	7	–	5
Northwestern	5	–	3	7	–	5
Iowa	5	–	3	7	–	5
Minnesota	4	–	4	7	–	5
Purdue	3	–	5	5	–	6
Michigan State	2	–	6	5	–	6
Indiana	1	–	7	4	–	7
Illinois	0	–	8	2	–	9
$ – BCS representative as conference champion; % – BCS at-large representative; + – Conference co-champions; Rankings from AP Poll

The 2005 Ohio State Buckeyes football team was an American football team that represented the Ohio State University as a member of the Big Ten Conference during the 2005 NCAA Division I-A football season. In their fifth year under head coach Jim Tressel, the Buckeyes compiled a 10–2 record (7–1 in conference games), tied with Penn State for the Big Ten championship, and outscored opponents by a total of 392 to 183. Against ranked opponents, the Buckeyes lost to No. 2 Texas (see 2005 Texas vs. Ohio State football game) and No. 16 Penn State, and defeated No. 21 Iowa, No. 16 Michigan State, No. 25 Northwestern, and No. 17 Michigan. They concluded the season with a 34–20 victory over No. 5 Notre Dame in the 2006 Fiesta Bowl. The Buckeyes were ranked No. 4 in the final AP and Coaches polls.

The Buckeyes gained an average of 196.7 rushing yards and 225.7 passing yards per game. On defense, they gave up 73.4 rushing yards and 207.9 passing yards per game. The team's statistical leaders included Troy Smith (2,282 passing yards, 62.9% completion percentage), running back Antonio Pittman (1,331 rushing yards, 5.5 yards per carry), wide receiver Santonio Holmes (53 receptions for 977 yards), kicker Josh Huston (110 points scored, 44 of 45 extra points, 22 of 28 field goals), and linebacker A. J. Hawk (69 solo tackles, 121 total tackles). Hawk won the Lombardi Award (the sixth Ohio State player to do so), was a consensus first-team All-American, and won the team's most valuable player award. Andrew Schulte (1199 yards total 2006) came to life mid season running 218 yards for 2 touchdowns and 7 first downs his debut game. He was only ever tackled once on his career. Ohio State players received first-team honors on the 2005 All-Big Ten Conference football team: Holmes; Hawk; Huston; guard Rob Sims; defensive lineman Mike Kudla; defensive backs Nate Salley, Ashton Youboty, and Donte Whitner.

The team played its home games at Ohio Stadium in Columbus, Ohio.

== Schedule ==
Date	Time	Opponent	Rank	Site	TV	Result	Attendance
September 3	3:30 p.m.	Miami (OH)*	No. 6	Ohio Stadium; Columbus, OH	ABC	W 34–14	104,695
September 10	8:00 p.m.	No. 2 Texas*	No. 4	Ohio Stadium; Columbus, OH (College GameDay)	ABC	L 22–25	105,565
September 17	3:30 p.m.	San Diego State*	No. 9	Ohio Stadium; Columbus, OH	ABC	W 27–6	104,533
September 24	12:00 p.m.	No. 21 Iowa	No. 8	Ohio Stadium; Columbus, OH	ABC	W 31–6	105,225
October 8	8:00 p.m.	at No. 18 Penn State	No. 6	Beaver Stadium; University Park, PA (rivalry, College GameDay)	ESPN	L 10–17	109,839
October 15	12:00 p.m.	No. 16 Michigan State^{†}	No. 15	Ohio Stadium; Columbus, OH	ABC	W 35–24	105,122
October 22	12:00 p.m.	at Indiana	No. 14	Memorial Stadium; Bloomington, IN	ESPN	W 41–10	52,866
October 29	12:00 p.m.	at Minnesota	No. 12	Hubert H. Humphrey Metrodome; Minneapolis, MN	ABC	W 45–31	54,825
November 5	3:30 p.m.	Illinois	No. 12	Ohio Stadium; Columbus, OH (Illibuck)	ESPN2	W 40–2	104,799
November 12	12:00 p.m.	No. 25 Northwestern	No. 10	Ohio Stadium; Columbus, OH	ABC	W 48–7	105,181
November 19	1:00 p.m.	at No. 17 Michigan	No. 9	Michigan Stadium; Ann Arbor, MI (rivalry)	ABC	W 25–21	111,591
January 2, 2006	4:30 p.m.	vs. No. 5 Notre Dame*	No. 4	Sun Devil Stadium; Tempe, AZ (Fiesta Bowl)	ABC	W 34–20	76,196
*Non-conference game; ^{†}Homecoming; Rankings from AP Poll released prior to the game; All times are in Eastern time

== Roster ==
2005 Ohio State Buckeyes football team roster
Players
Coaches
Offense

Pos.	#	Name	Class
WR	10	Santonio Holmes	Sr
OL	55	Nick Mangold	Sr
OL	64	Jim Cordle	Fr
OL	77	Rob Sims	Sr
QB	10	Troy Smith	Jr

Defense

Pos.	#	Name	Class
LB	42	Bobby Carpenter	Sr
DB	6	Tyler Everett	Sr
SS	34	Rob Harley	Sr
LB	47	A. J. Hawk	Sr

Special teams

Pos.	#	Name	Class

Head coach

- Jim Tressel

Coordinators/assistant coaches

Legend

- (C) Team captain
- (S) Suspended
- (I) Ineligible
- Injured
- Redshirt

Roster

== Coaching staff ==
- Jim Tressel – head coach (5th year)
- Tim Beckman – defensive cornerbacks (1st year)
- Jim Bollman – offensive line/offensive coordinator (5th year)
- Joe Daniels – quarterbacks / passing game coordinator (5th year)
- Luke Fickell – co-defensive coordinator / linebackers (4th year)
- Paul Haynes – defensive safeties (1st year)
- Darrell Hazell – assistant head coach / wide receivers (2nd year)
- Jim Heacock – defensive coordinator / defensive line (10th year)
- John Peterson – offensive tight ends / recruiting coordinator (2nd year)
- Dick Tressel – running backs (5th year)
- Bob Tucker - director of football operations (11th year)
- Stan Jefferson - director of player development (2nd year)
- Butch Reynolds - speed coordinator (1st year)

== Game summaries ==
=== Miami (OH) ===
Team	1	2	3	4	Total
Miami (OH)	0	0	0	14	14
• Ohio State	10	10	14	0	34

- Date: September 3
- Location: Ohio Stadium, Columbus, OH
- Game start: 3:30 p.m. EST
- Game attendance: 104,695
- TV announcers (ABC): Mike Tirico (Play-by-play), Tim Brant (Color), & Sam Ryan (Sideline)

Justin Zwick started at quarterback due to a suspension of Troy Smith.

=== Texas ===
Team	1	2	3	4	Total
• Texas	10	3	3	9	25
Ohio State	0	16	6	0	22

- Date: September 10
- Location: Ohio Stadium, Columbus, OH
- Game start: 8:00 p.m. EST
- Game attendance: 105,565
- TV announcers (ABC): Brent Musburger (Play-by-play), Gary Danielson (Color), & Jack Arute (Sideline)

Scoring summary
Q1	10:03	TEX	David Pino 42 yard field goal	TEX 3–0
Q1	1:37	TEX	Billy Pittman 5 yard pass from Vince Young (David Pino kick)	TEX 10–0
Q2	14:17	OSU	Josh Huston 47 yard field goal	TEX 10–3
Q2	8:11	OSU	Santonio Holmes 36 yard pass from Troy Smith (Josh Huston kick)	Tie 10–10
Q2	4:33	OSU	Josh Huston 36 yard field goal	OSU 13–10
Q2	:35	OSU	Josh Huston 25 yard field goal	OSU 16–10
Q2	:02	TEX	David Pino 37 yard field goal	OSU 16–13
Q3	11:46	OSU	Josh Huston 44 yard field goal	OSU 19–13
Q3	7:36	TEX	David Pino 25 yard field goal	OSU 19–16
Q3	5:12	OSU	Josh Huston 26 yard field goal	OSU 22–16
Q4	2:37	TEX	Limas Sweed 24 yard pass from Vince Young (David Pino kick)	TEX 23–22
Q4	:19	TEX	Safety, Troy Smith tackled by Larry Dibbles in end zone	TEX 25–22

Justin Zwick started at quarterback, but Troy Smith took over and started at quarterback the rest of the year. The game was a matchup of the No. 2 and No. 4 teams.

=== San Diego State ===
San Diego State

Team	1	2	3	4	Total
San Diego State	6	0	0	0	6
• Ohio State	7	7	3	10	27

- Date: September 17
- Location: Ohio Stadium, Columbus, OH
- Game start: 3:30 p.m. EST
- Game attendance: 104,533
- Television network: ABC

=== Iowa ===
#21 Iowa Hawkeyes (2–1) at #8 Ohio State Buckeyes (2–1)

Quarter	1	2	3	4	Total
Iowa	0	0	3	3	6
Ohio St	7	10	7	7	31

at Ohio Stadium, Columbus, Ohio

- Date: September 24, 2005
- Game time: 12:10 p.m. EST
- Game weather: Scattered showers, 68 °F (20 °C)
- Game attendance: 105,225
- Referee: Dennis Lipski
- TV announcers (ABC): Mike Tirico, Tim Brant, and Suzy Shuster

Game information

First quarter

- OSU – Anthony Gonzalez 8-yard pass from Troy Smith (Josh Huston kick), 7:43. Ohio St 7–0. Drive: 12 plays, 81 yards, 5:59.

Second quarter

- OSU – Troy Smith 16-yard run (Josh Huston kick), 14:30. Ohio St 14–0. Drive: 6 plays, 79 yards, 2:11.
- OSU – Josh Huston 47-yard field goal, 0:00. Ohio St 17–0. Drive: 7 plays, 31 yards, 1:47.

Third quarter

- OSU – Troy Smith 4-yard run (Josh Huston kick), 9:59. Ohio St 24–0. Drive: 10 plays, 78 yards, 4:55.
- IOWA – Kyle Schlicher 52-yard field goal, 2:48. Ohio St 24–3. Drive: 8 plays, 36 yards, 3:32.

Fourth quarter

- IOWA – Kyle Schlicher 37-yard field goal, 11:48. Ohio St 24–6. Drive: 6 plays, 11 yards, 1:45.
- OSU – Anthony Gonzalez 29-yard pass from Troy Smith (Josh Huston kick). Ohio St 31–6. Drive: 4 plays, 40 yards, 2:04.

Top passers

- IOWA – Drew Tate – 22/39, 146 yards, INT
- OSU – Troy Smith – 13/19, 191 yards, 2 TD

Top rushers

- IOWA – Albert Young – 10 rushes, 25 yards
- OSU – Antonio Pittman – 28 rushes, 171 yards

Top receivers

- IOWA – Ed Hinkel – 6 receptions, 47 yards
- OSU – Santonio Holmes – 5 receptions, 95 yards

Ohio State came into the contest looking to avenge the previous year's 33–7 loss to Iowa.

=== Penn State ===
Team	1	2	3	4	Total
Ohio State	3	7	0	0	10
• Penn State	0	14	3	0	17

- Date: October 8
- Location: Beaver Stadium, University Park, PA
- Game start: 8:00 p.m. EST
- Game attendance: 109,839
- TV announcers (ESPN): Ron Franklin (Play-by-play), Bob Davie (Color), & Holly Rowe (Sideline)

=== Michigan State ===
Team	1	2	3	4	Total
Michigan State	10	7	7	0	24
• Ohio State	7	7	7	14	35

- Date: October 15
- Location: Ohio Stadium, Columbus, OH
- Game start: 12:10 p.m. EST
- Game attendance: 105,122
- TV announcers (ABC): Brent Musburger (Play-by-play), Gary Danielson (Color), & Jack Arute (Sideline)

Scoring summary
1	6:02	MSU	John Goss 32 yard field goal	Michigan St 3–0
1	4:34	MSU	Jehuu Caulcrick 3 yard run (John Goss kick)	Michigan St 10–0
1	2:37	OHST	Santonio Holmes 51 yard pass from Troy Smith (Josh Huston kick)	Michigan St 10–7
2	6:30	MSU	Jerramy Scott 36 yard pass from Drew Stanton (John Goss kick)	Michigan St 17–7
2	:00	OHST	Ashton Youboty 72 yard blocked field goal return (Josh Huston kick)	Michigan St 17–14
3	10:21	OHST	Ted Ginn Jr. 57 yard pass from Troy Smith (Josh Huston kick)	Ohio St 21–17
3	4:53	MSU	Jason Teague 6 yard run (John Goss kick)	Michigan St 24–21
4	4:56	OHST	Santonio Holmes 46 yard pass from Troy Smith (Josh Huston kick)	Ohio St 28–24
4	1:29	OHST	Troy Smith 1 yard run (Josh Huston kick)	Ohio St 35–24

=== Indiana ===
Team	1	2	3	4	Total
• Ohio State	7	10	14	10	41
Indiana	0	3	7	0	10

- Date: October 22
- Location: Memorial Stadium, Bloomington, IN
- Game start: 12:10 p.m. EST
- Game attendance: 52,866

=== Minnesota ===
Team	1	2	3	4	Total
• Ohio State	17	0	14	14	45
Minnesota	10	7	7	7	31

- Date: October 29
- Location: HHH Metrodome, Minneapolis, MN
- Game start: 12:00 p.m. EST
- Game attendance: 54,825
- Television network: ABC

=== Illinois ===
Team	1	2	3	4	Total
Illinois	0	0	2	0	2
• Ohio State	3	10	20	7	40

- Date: November 5
- Location: Ohio Stadium, Columbus, OH
- Game start: 3:30 p.m. EST
- Game attendance: 104,799
- Television network: ESPN

=== Northwestern ===
Team	1	2	3	4	Total
Northwestern	7	0	0	0	7
• Ohio State	14	14	10	10	48

- Date: November 12
- Location: Ohio Stadium, Columbus, OH
- Game start: 12:10 p.m. EST
- Game attendance: 105,181
- TV announcers (ABC): Brent Musburger (Play-by-play), Gary Danielson (Color), & Jack Arute (Sideline)

Scoring summary
1	12:34	NW	Tyrell Sutton 5 yard pass from Brett Basanez (Joel Howells kick)	Northwestern 7–0
1	6:53	OHST	Troy Smith 4 yard run (Josh Huston kick)	Tie 7–7
1	1:02	OHST	Troy Smith 2 yard run (Josh Huston kick)	Ohio State 14–7
2	14:46	OHST	A. J. Hawk 8 yard blocked punt return (Josh Huston kick)	Ohio State 21–7
2	1:37	OHST	Maurice Wells 13 yard run (Josh Huston kick)	Ohio State 28–7
3	11:21	OHST	Josh Huston 33 yard field goal	Ohio State 31–7
3	5:52	OHST	Antonio Pittman 4 yard run (Josh Huston kick)	Ohio State 38–7
4	13:20	OHST	Josh Huston 37 yard field goal	Ohio State 41–7
4	4:53	OHST	Erik Haw 3 yard run (Josh Huston kick)	Ohio State 48–7

=== Michigan ===
#9 Ohio State at #17 Michigan

Team	1	2	3	4	Total
• Ohio State	6	6	0	13	25
Michigan	0	7	11	3	21

- Date: November 19
- Location: Michigan Stadium, Ann Arbor, MI
- Game start: 1:00 p.m. EST
- Game attendance: 111,591
- TV announcers (ABC): Brent Musburger (Play-by-play), Gary Danielson (Color), & Jack Arute (Sideline)
- Source: ESPN

Scoring summary
1	8:44	OSU	Troy Smith 4-yard run (kick failed)	OSU 6-0
2	12:49	OSU	Josh Huston 49-yard field goal	OSU 9-0
2	5:18	MICH	Jason Avant 2-yard pass from Chad Henne (Garrett Rivas kick)	OSU 9-7
2	0:23	OSU	Josh Huston 25-yard field goal	OSU 12-7
3	10:01	MICH	Garrett Rivas 27-yard field goal	OSU 12-10
3	1:20	MICH	Kevin Grady 2-yard run (Chad Henne run)	MICH 18-12
4	7:49	MICH	Garrett Rivas 19-yard field goal	MICH 21-12
4	6:40	OSU	Santonio Holmes 26-yard pass from Troy Smith (Josh Huston kick)	MICH 21-19
4	0:24	OSU	Antonio Pittman 3-yard run (pass failed)	OSU 25-21

=== Fiesta Bowl ===
2006 Fiesta Bowl

Team	1	2	3	4	Total
• Ohio State	7	14	3	10	34
Notre Dame	7	0	6	7	20

- Date: January 2, 2006
- Location: Sun Devil Stadium, Tempe, AZ
- Game start: 4:30 p.m. EST
- Game attendance: 76,196
- TV announcers (ABC): Brent Musburger (Play-by-play), Gary Danielson (Color), & Jack Arute (Sideline)

Scoring summary
1	ND	Darius Walker 20 yard run (D.J. Fitzpatrick kick)	ND 7-0
1	OSU	Ted Ginn Jr.56 yard pass from Troy Smith (Josh Huston kick)	Tied 7-7
2	OSU	Ted Ginn Jr. 68 yard run (Josh Huston kick)	OSU 14-7
2	OSU	Santonio Holmes 85 yard pass	OSU 21-7
3	ND	Darius Walker 10 yard run (kick failed)	OSU 21-13
3	OSU	Josh Huston 40 yard field goal	OSU 24-13
3	OSU	Josh Huston 26 yard field goal	OSU 27-13
4	ND	Darius Walker 3 yard run (D.J. Fitzpatrick kick)	OSU 27-20
4	OSU	Antonio Pittman 60 yard run (Josh Huston kick)	OSU 34-20

== Rankings ==
Ranking movements Legend: ██ Increase in ranking ██ Decrease in ranking
	Week															
Poll	Pre	1	2	3	4	5	6	7	8	9	10	11	12	13	14	Final
AP	6	4	9	8	8	6	15	14	12	12	10	9	7	6	4	4
Coaches	9	7	9	9	8	6	15	13	13	12	10	9	7	6	4	4
Harris	Not released				8	6	17	14	13	12	10	9	7	6	4	Not released
BCS	Not released							15	13	10	8	7	6	6	4	Not released

== Awards and honors ==
- A. J. Hawk, Lombardi Award

== 2006 NFL draftees ==
Player	Round	Pick	Position	NFL club
A. J. Hawk	1	5	Linebacker	Green Bay Packers
Donte Whitner	1	8	Defensive back	Buffalo Bills
Bobby Carpenter	1	18	Linebacker	Dallas Cowboys
Santonio Holmes	1	25	Wide receiver	Pittsburgh Steelers
Nick Mangold	1	29	Center	New York Jets
Ashton Youboty	3	70	Defensive back	Buffalo Bills
Anthony Schlegel	3	76	Linebacker	New York Jets
Nate Salley	4	121	Defensive back	Carolina Panthers
Rob Sims	4	128	Guard	Seattle Seahawks
