= 2005 Purdue Boilermakers football team =

American college football season

2005 Purdue Boilermakers football
- Conference: Big Ten Conference
- Record: 5–6 (3–5 Big Ten)
- Head coach: Joe Tiller (9th season)
- Offensive coordinator: Jim Chaney (9th season)
- Offensive scheme: Spread
- Defensive coordinator: Brock Spack (9th season)
- Base defense: 4–3
- MVP: Rob Ninkovich
- Captains: Charles Davis; Matt Turner; Brandon Villarreal; Jerod Void
- Home stadium: Ross–Ade Stadium

2005 Big Ten Conference football standings
| | Conf. | | | Overall |
| Team | W | | L | W | | L |
|---|---|---|---|---|---|---|
| No. 3 Penn State $+ | 7 | – | 1 | 11 | – | 1 |
| No. 4 Ohio State %+ | 7 | – | 1 | 10 | – | 2 |
| No. 15 Wisconsin | 5 | – | 3 | 10 | – | 3 |
| Michigan | 5 | – | 3 | 7 | – | 5 |
| Northwestern | 5 | – | 3 | 7 | – | 5 |
| Iowa | 5 | – | 3 | 7 | – | 5 |
| Minnesota | 4 | – | 4 | 7 | – | 5 |
| Purdue | 3 | – | 5 | 5 | – | 6 |
| Michigan State | 2 | – | 6 | 5 | – | 6 |
| Indiana | 1 | – | 7 | 4 | – | 7 |
| Illinois | 0 | – | 8 | 2 | – | 9 |
$ – BCS representative as conference champion; % – BCS at-large representative; + – Conference co-champions; Rankings from AP Poll

The 2005 Purdue Boilermakers football team represented Purdue University during the 2005 NCAA Division I-A football season. The team was coached by Joe Tiller and played its home games at Ross–Ade Stadium. Purdue played eleven games in the 2005 season, finishing with a 5–6 record and missing a post-season bowl game for the first time since 1996. Purdue was predicted by many as a dark horse for the Big Ten title, but after a strong 2–0 start, lost six straight before rebounding to finish a more respectable 5–6.

This was also the last season Purdue started games at different local times with other teams in the Eastern Time Zone, as the State of Indiana began observing Daylight Saving Time in 2006.

== Schedule ==
| Date | Time | Opponent | Rank | Site | TV | Result | Attendance |
|---|---|---|---|---|---|---|---|
| September 10 | 1:00 pm | Akron* | No. 13 | Ross–Ade Stadium; West Lafayette, IN | ESPN360 | W 49–24 | 64,757 |
| September 17 | 10:00 pm | at Arizona* | No. 12 | Arizona Stadium; Tucson, AZ | | W 31–24 | 56,400 |
| September 24 | 12:00 pm | at Minnesota | No. 11 | Hubert H. Humphrey Metrodome; Minneapolis, MN | ESPN | L 35–42 ^{2OT} | 48,116 |
| October 1 | 7:45 pm | No. 13 Notre Dame* | No. 22 | Ross–Ade Stadium; West Lafayette, IN | ESPN | L 28–49 | 65,491 |
| October 8 | 4:30 pm | Iowa | | Ross–Ade Stadium; West Lafayette, IN | ESPN | L 17–34 | 64,785 |
| October 15 | 1:00 pm | Northwestern | | Ross–Ade Stadium; West Lafayette, IN | ESPN2 | L 29–34 | 62,866 |
| October 22 | 3:30 pm | at No. 19 Wisconsin | | Camp Randall Stadium; Madison, WI | ABC | L 20–31 | 82,828 |
| October 29 | 3:30 pm | at No. 11 Penn State | | Beaver Stadium; University Park, PA | ABC | L 15–33 | 109,467 |
| November 5 | 12:00 pm | Michigan State | | Ross–Ade Stadium; West Lafayette, IN | ESPNU | W 28–21 | 62,467 |
| November 12 | 12:00 pm | Illinois | | Ross–Ade Stadium; West Lafayette, IN (Purdue Cannon) | ESPN+ | W 37–3 | 57,611 |
| November 19 | 1:00 pm | at Indiana | | Memorial Stadium; Bloomington, IN (Old Oaken Bucket) | ESPN360 | W 41–14 | 50,023 |
*Non-conference game; Rankings from AP Poll released prior to the game; All times are in Eastern time

== Personnel ==
2005 Purdue Boilermakers football team roster
Players
Coaches
Offense

| Pos. | # | Name | Class |
|---|---|---|---|
| WR | 9 | Dorien Bryant | So |
| WR | 20 | Andre Chattams | Jr |
| TE | 21 | Charles Davis | Sr |
| OL | | Jordan Grimes |
| WR | 80 | Brian Hare | Sr |
| RB | 42 | Anthony Heygood | Fr |
| WR | 89 | Kyle Ingraham | Jr |
| RB | 27 | Brandon Jones | So |
| TE | 28 | Dustin Keller | So |
| QB | 11 | Brandon Kirsch | Jr |
| WR | 23 | Kevin Noel | Sr |
| G | 67 | Uche Nwaneri | So |
| WR | 21 | Greg Orton | Fr |
| OT | 65 | Mike Otto | Jr |
| QB | 12 | Curtis Painter | Fr |
| OL | | Robbie Powell |
| OL | 74 | Sean Sester | Fr |
| RB | 40 | Kory Sheets | Fr |
| WR | 88 | Jake Standeford | So |
| OL | 56 | Matt Turner | Sr |
| RB | 32 | Jarod Void | Sr |
| TE | 94 | Jake Wasikowski | Fr |
| WR | 19 | Brandon Whittington | Fr |
| WR | 2 | Ray Williams | Sr |

Defense }

| Pos. | # | Name | Class |
|---|---|---|---|
| LB | 85 | Cliff Avril | So |
| DL | 90 | Ryan Baker | Fr |
| LB | 36 | Dan Bick | So |
| DE | 45 | Eugene Bright | So |
| DL | 91 | Nick Cavallo | Jr |
| DE | 10 | Ray Edwards | Jr |
| LB | 17 | Josh Ferguson | So |
| DB | 15 | Christian Graham | Fr |
| FS | 27 | Jerad Grey | So |
| DL | | Brent Grover |
| DL | 79 | Jermaine Guynn | Fr |
| LB | 30 | George Hall | Jr |
| DB | 33 | Brian Hickman | Sr |
| LB | 39 | Bobby Iwuchukwu | Sr |
| LB | 59 | Stanford Keglar | So |
| CB | 18 | Brandon King | Fr |
| LB | 41 | John Lampert | Jr |
| DB | 5 | Zach Logan | Fr |
| DB | 25 | Paul Long | So |
| DT | 71 | Alex Magee | Fr |
| DB | 38 | Brian Mattaway | Jr |
| DB | 26 | Lance Melvin | Fr |
| DE | 93 | Rob Ninkovich | Sr |
| DB | 24 | Sean Petty | Sr |
| SS | 31 | Bernard Pollard | Jr |
| LB | 81 | Al Royal | Jr |
| DB | 7 | Kyle Smith | Sr |
| DE | 49 | Anthony Spencer | Jr |
| DL | 55 | Brandon Villareal | Sr |
| LB | 34 | Kyle Williams | Fr |

Special teams

| Pos. | # | Name | Class |
|---|---|---|---|
| P | 16 | Dave Brytus | So |
| K | 35 | Ben Jones | Sr |

Head coach

- Joe Tiller

Coordinators/assistant coaches

- Jim Chaney (offensive coordinator)
- Brock Spack (defensive coordinator)
- Lou Anarumo (defensive backs)
- Tony Samuel (defensive ends)

Legend

- (C) Team captain
- (S) Suspended
- (I) Ineligible
- Injured
- Redshirt

== Game summaries ==
=== Akron ===
| Team | 1 | 2 | 3 | 4 | Total |
|---|---|---|---|---|---|
| Akron | 0 | 14 | 3 | 7 | 24 |
| • Purdue | 14 | 14 | 0 | 21 | 49 |

- Date: September 10
- Location: Ross–Ade Stadium, West Lafayette, Indiana

=== Arizona ===
| Team | 1 | 2 | 3 | 4 | Total |
|---|---|---|---|---|---|
| • Purdue | 14 | 7 | 10 | 0 | 31 |
| Arizona | 7 | 10 | 0 | 7 | 24 |

- Date: September 17
- Location: Arizona Stadium, Tucson, Arizona

=== Minnesota ===
| Team | 1 | 2 | 3 | 4 | OT | 2OT | Total |
|---|---|---|---|---|---|---|---|
| Purdue | 0 | 7 | 21 | 0 | 7 | 0 | 35 |
| • Minnesota | 3 | 7 | 10 | 8 | 7 | 7 | 42 |

- Date: September 24
- Location: Hubert H. Humphrey Metrodome, Minneapolis, Minnesota
- Game start: 12:00
- TV announcers (ABC): Mark Jones, Chris Spielman, Rob Stone

=== Notre Dame ===
| Team | 1 | 2 | 3 | 4 | Total |
|---|---|---|---|---|---|
| • Notre Dame | 7 | 21 | 7 | 14 | 49 |
| Purdue | 0 | 0 | 14 | 14 | 28 |

- Date: October 1
- Location: Ross–Ade Stadium, West Lafayette, Indiana
- Game start: 7:45
- TV announcers (ESPN): Ron Franklin, Bob Davie, Holly Rowe

=== Iowa ===
| Team | 1 | 2 | 3 | 4 | Total |
|---|---|---|---|---|---|
| • Iowa | 14 | 3 | 6 | 11 | 34 |
| Purdue | 7 | 7 | 3 | 0 | 17 |

- Date: October 8
- Location: Ross–Ade Stadium, West Lafayette, Indiana
- Game start: 4:30
- TV announcers (ESPN): Mark Jones, Chris Spielman, Rob Stone

=== Northwestern ===
| Team | 1 | 2 | 3 | 4 | Total |
|---|---|---|---|---|---|
| • Northwestern | 14 | 14 | 0 | 6 | 34 |
| Purdue | 3 | 6 | 14 | 6 | 29 |

- Date: October 15
- Location: Ross–Ade Stadium, West Lafayette, Indiana
- Game start: 1:00
- TV announcers (ESPN2): Pam Ward, David Norrie, Jimmy Dykes

=== Wisconsin ===
| Team | 1 | 2 | 3 | 4 | Total |
|---|---|---|---|---|---|
| Purdue | 0 | 10 | 3 | 7 | 20 |
| • Wisconsin | 10 | 0 | 14 | 7 | 31 |

- Date: October 22
- Location: Camp Randall Stadium, Madison, Wisconsin
- Game start: 3:30
- TV announcers (ABC): Gary Thorne, Ed Cunningham, Dave LaMont

=== At Penn State ===
Purdue Boilermakers (2–5) at #11 Penn State Nittany Lions (7–1)

| Quarter | 1 | 2 | 3 | 4 | Total |
|---|---|---|---|---|---|
| Purdue | 7 | 0 | 0 | 8 | 15 |
| Penn St | 3 | 13 | 7 | 10 | 33 |

at Beaver Stadium, University Park, Pennsylvania

- Date: October 29
- Game time: 3:30 p.m. EST
- Game weather: Partly sunny, 49 °F (9 °C)
- Game attendance: 109,467
- Referee: S. Newman
- TV announcers (ABC): Brent Musburger, Gary Danielson, Jack Arute
- Box Score

Game information

First quarter

- PSU – Kevin Kelly 27-yard field goal, 7:22. Penn St 3–0. Drive: 13 plays, 85 yards, 5:16.
- PUR – Curtis Painter 24-yard run, 3:35. Purdue 7–3. Drive: 1 play, 24 yards, 0:08.

Second quarter

- PSU – Kevin Kelly 25-yard field goal, 14:15. Purdue 7–6. Drive: 7 plays, 31 yards, 2:31.
- PSU – Michael Robinson 1-yard run (Kevin Kelly kick), 8:18. Penn St 13–7. Drive: 8 plays, 80 yards, 3:53.
- PSU – Kevin Kelly 33-yard field goal, 0:00. Penn St 16–7. Drive: 5 plays, 60 yards, 0:34.

Third quarter

- PSU – BranDon Snow 2-yard run (Kevin Kelly kick), 12:42. Penn St 23–7. Drive: 4 plays, 42 yards, 2:08.

Fourth quarter

- PUR – Brandon Kirsch 4-yard run (run good), 9:50. Penn St 23–15. Drive: 7 plays, 58 yards, 1:30.
- PSU – Kevin Kelly 22-yard field goal, 5:41. Penn St 26–15. Drive: 8 plays, 61 yards, 4:09.
- PSU – BranDon Snow 4-yard run (Kevin Kelly kick), 1:37. Penn St 33–15. Drive: 7 plays, 53 yards, 3:52.

Top passers

- PUR – Brandon Kirsch – 11/21, 102 yards, INT
- PSU – Michael Robinson – 13/29, 213 yards

Top rushers

- PUR – Jerod Void – 10 rushes, 57 yards
- PSU – Tony Hunt – 24 rushes, 129 yards

Top receivers

- PUR – Kyle Ingraham – 7 receptions, 77 yards
- PSU – Jordan Norwood – 4 receptions, 59 yards

=== Michigan State ===
| Team | 1 | 2 | 3 | 4 | Total |
|---|---|---|---|---|---|
| Michigan St | 14 | 7 | 0 | 0 | 21 |
| • Purdue | 7 | 7 | 7 | 7 | 28 |

- Date: November 5
- Location: Ross–Ade Stadium, West Lafayette, Indiana
- Game start: 12:00
- TV announcers (ESPNU/ESPN+): Wayne Larrivee, Randy Wright, Quint Kessenich

=== Illinois ===
| Team | 1 | 2 | 3 | 4 | Total |
|---|---|---|---|---|---|
| Illinois | 0 | 0 | 0 | 3 | 3 |
| • Purdue | 0 | 10 | 7 | 20 | 37 |

- Date: November 12
- Location: Ross–Ade Stadium, West Lafayette, Indiana

=== Indiana ===
| Team | 1 | 2 | 3 | 4 | Total |
|---|---|---|---|---|---|
| • Purdue | 0 | 27 | 7 | 7 | 41 |
| Indiana | 7 | 0 | 0 | 7 | 14 |

- Date: November 19
- Location: Memorial Stadium, Bloomington, Indiana

=== 2006 NFL draft ===
| Player | Position | Round | Pick | NFL club |
| Bernard Pollard | Safety | 2 | 54 | Kansas City Chiefs |
| Ray Edwards | Defensive Lineman | 4 | 127 | Minnesota Vikings |
| Rob Ninkovich | Defensive End | 5 | 135 | New Orleans Saints |
| Charles Davis | Tight End | 5 | 167 | Pittsburgh Steelers |
