= 2005 Minnesota Golden Gophers football team =

American college football season

2005 Minnesota Golden Gophers football

Music City Bowl, L 31–34 vs. Virginia
- Conference: Big Ten Conference
- Record: 7–5 (4–4 Big Ten)
- Head coach: Glen Mason (9th season)
- Co-offensive coordinators: Mitch Browning (6th season); Tony Petersen (6th season)
- Defensive coordinator: David Lockwood (1st season)
- Captains: Greg Eslinger; Anthony Montgomery; John Pawielski; Mark Setterstrom
- Home stadium: Hubert H. Humphrey Metrodome

2005 Big Ten Conference football standings
	Conf.			Overall
Team	W		L	W		L
No. 3 Penn State $+	7	–	1	11	–	1
No. 4 Ohio State %+	7	–	1	10	–	2
No. 15 Wisconsin	5	–	3	10	–	3
Michigan	5	–	3	7	–	5
Northwestern	5	–	3	7	–	5
Iowa	5	–	3	7	–	5
Minnesota	4	–	4	7	–	5
Purdue	3	–	5	5	–	6
Michigan State	2	–	6	5	–	6
Indiana	1	–	7	4	–	7
Illinois	0	–	8	2	–	9
$ – BCS representative as conference champion; % – BCS at-large representative; + – Conference co-champions; Rankings from AP Poll

The 2005 Minnesota Golden Gophers football team represented the University of Minnesota as a member of the Big Ten Conference during the 2005 NCAA Division I-A football season. In their ninth year under head coach Glen Mason, the Golden Gophers compiled an overall record of 7–5 with a mark of 4–4 in conference play, placing seventh in the Big Ten. Minnesota was invited to the Music City Bowl, where the Golden Gophers lost to Virginia. The team played home games at the Hubert H. Humphrey Metrodome in Minneapolis.

The most notable win of the season came as Minnesota defeated Michigan to win the Little Brown Jug for the first time since 1986.

== Schedule ==
Date	Time	Opponent	Rank	Site	TV	Result	Attendance
September 1	9:30 pm	at Tulsa*		Skelly Stadium; Tulsa, OK	ESPN2	W 41–10	33,410
September 10	1:00 pm	Colorado State*		Hubert H. Humphrey Metrodome; Minneapolis, MN	ESPN2	W 56–24	40,221
September 17	7:30 pm	Florida Atlantic*		Hubert H. Humphrey Metrodome; Minneapolis, MN	FSN	W 46–7	40,709
September 24	11:00 am	No. 11 Purdue		Hubert H. Humphrey Metrodome; Minneapolis, MN	ESPN	W 42–35 ^{2OT}	48,116
October 1	2:30 pm	at Penn State	No. 18	Beaver Stadium; University Park, PA (Governor's Victory Bell)	ABC	L 14–44	106,604
October 8	12:00 pm	at No. 21 Michigan		Michigan Stadium; Ann Arbor, MI (Little Brown Jug)	ABC	W 23–20	111,117
October 15	11:00 am	No. 23 Wisconsin	No. 22	Hubert H. Humphrey Metrodome; Minneapolis, MN (rivalry)	ESPN	L 34–38	65,089
October 29	11:00 am	No. 12 Ohio State		Hubert H. Humphrey Metrodome; Minneapolis, MN	ABC	L 31–45	54,825
November 5	11:00 am	at Indiana		Memorial Stadium; Bloomington, IN	ESPN2	W 42–21	30,656
November 12	11:00 am	Michigan State		Hubert H. Humphrey Metrodome; Minneapolis, MN	ESPN Plus	W 41–18	45,187
November 19	11:00 am	at Iowa		Kinnick Stadium; Iowa City, IA (rivalry)	ESPN2	L 28–52	70,585
December 30	11:00 am	vs. Virginia*		The Coliseum; Nashville, TN (Music Bowl)	ESPN	L 31–34	40,519
*Non-conference game; Rankings from AP Poll released prior to the game; All times are in Central time

== Rankings ==
Ranking movements Legend: ██ Increase in ranking ██ Decrease in ranking — = Not ranked RV = Received votes
	Week																
Poll	Pre	1	2	3	4	5	6	7	8	9	10	11	12	13	14	15	Final
AP	—	—	—	RV	18	RV	22	RV	25	RV	RV	RV	—	—	—	—	—
Coaches	—	—	—	RV	19	RV	22	25	22	RV	RV	RV	—	—	—	—	—
Harris	Not released				20	RV	22	25	23	RV	RV	25	—	—	—	—	Not released
BCS	Not released							22	20	—	24	21	—	—	—	—	Not released

== Game summaries ==
=== Tulsa ===
	1	2	3	4	Total
Golden Gophers	17	7	3	14	41
Golden Hurricanes	0	3	0	7	10

The Gophers open the 2005 season in dominating fashion. Laurence Maroney rushed for 203 yards and 2 touchdowns. Bryan Cupito added 235 yards passing and 1 touchdown. Gary Russell had only six carries but two touchdowns, both coming in the fourth quarter.

=== Colorado State ===
	1	2	3	4	Total
Rams	0	10	0	14	24
Golden Gophers	3	19	20	14	56

The Gophers continued their high scoring ways to open the season, romping over Colorado State. Laurence Maroney had another big day, rushing for 133 yards and 2 touchdowns. Gary Russell had 2 touchdowns on seven carries. The Golden Gophers had fantastic average field position, starting at their own 40-yard line, but Tulsa averaged their starting at their own 21-yard line.

=== Florida Atlantic ===
	1	2	3	4	Total
Owls	0	0	7	0	7
Golden Gophers	20	20	6	0	46

All-time record against Florida Atlantic: 1–0–0

The Golden Gophers won the third game of the season, defeating the Florida Atlantic Owls. Bryan Cupito passed 10 for 17 and 230 yards, with 2 touchdowns. Laurence Maroney and Gary Russell each scored two touchdowns on the day. The Minnesota rushing attack accumulated 349 yards on the ground. The Gophers once again had better field position than their opponents, as the Gophers were 16 yards better than the Owls, starting at the 37-yard line.

=== Purdue ===
	1	2	3	4	OT	2OT	Total
No. 11 Boilermakers	0	7	7	14	7	0	35
Golden Gophers	3	7	10	8	7	7	42

The Golden Gophers won their fourth game of the season, winning in double overtime of Purdue. Laurence Maroney had another big day for the Golden Gophers, rushing for 217 yards. Bryan Cupito passed for 271 yards and three touchdowns. He also rushed for a two-point conversion in the waning time of the fourth quarter, giving a tying score that would eventually force overtime. Logan Payne caught a touchdown in the first overtime, and Gary Russell scored the go-ahead touchdown in the second overtime, giving Minnesota the victory.

=== Penn State ===
	1	2	3	4	Total
No. 18 Golden Gophers	0	7	0	7	14
Nittany Lions	10	10	17	7	44

Penn State raced out to a 20-point lead on the way to a 30-point victory over the Golden Gophers. Minnesota's normally potent ground game was held to 113 yards. Bryan Cupito passed for 174 yards on the day. The Golden Gophers turned the ball over twice, compared to no turnovers for the Nittany Lions. The Nittany Lions regained the Governor's Victory Bell for the first time since 1998.

=== Michigan ===
Minnesota at #21 Michigan

Team	1	2	3	4	Total
• Minnesota	0	10	10	3	23
No. 21 Michigan	3	10	7	0	20

- Date: Saturday, October 8
- Location: Michigan Stadium, Ann Arbor, Michigan
- Game start: 1:00 P.M. EST
- TV announcers (ABC): Brad Nessler (play by play), Bob Griese (analyst), Lynn Swann (sideline)
- Source: ESPN

Scoring summary
1	10:26	Michigan	Garrett Rivas 23-yard field goal	Michigan 3–0
2	12:40	Minnesota	Jason Giannini 29-yard field goal	Tie 3–3
2	5:50	Michigan	Garrett Rivas 47-yard field goal	MICH 6–3
2	3:10	Michigan	Mike Hart 1-yard run (Garrett Rivas kick)	Michigan 13–3
2	0:58	Minnesota	Ernie Wheelwright 20-yard pass from Bryan Cupito (Jason Giannini kick)	Michigan 13–10
3	12:40	Minnesota	Jason Giannini 26-yard field goal	Tie 13–13
3	12:25	Michigan	Steve Breaston 95-yard kickoff return (Garrett Rivas kick)	Michigan 20–13
3	6:12	Minnesota	Laurence Maroney 1-yard run (Jason Giannini kick)	Tie 20–20
4	0:01	Minnesota	Jason Giannini 30-yard field goal	Minnesota 23–20

The Minnesota Golden Gophers won the Little Brown Jug for the first time since 1986. Laurence Maroney rushed for 129 yards on the day. Gary Russell ran for 128 yards on the day, nearly half the yards coming from one rush with under two minutes left in the game. That rush set up a final field goal by Jason Giannini. It was the first win for the Golden Gophers under Glen Mason. It was Michigan's was third loss on the season.

=== Wisconsin ===
	1	2	3	4	Total
No. 23 Badgers	7	3	7	21	38
No. 22 Golden Gophers	0	10	17	7	34

Coming off one of the biggest wins in recent memory, the Golden Gophers faced off against border rival, Wisconsin. The two teams traded the lead through the first half. With 3:27 left in the game, the Golden Gophers stretched the lead to 34–24. The Badgers then scored a touchdown, bringing the lead back down to a three-point gap. With 30 seconds left, the Badgers blocked a punt and recovered it for a touchdown. The Badgers kept Paul Bunyan's Axe for the second straight year.

=== Ohio State ===
	1	2	3	4	Total
No. 12 Buckeyes	17	0	14	14	45
Golden Gophers	10	7	7	7	31

Minnesota dropped the game to Ohio State, despite a solid performance from the Golden Gophers offense. Bryan Cupito had 26 completions on 35 attempts, and had 395 yards passing. Laurence Maroney rushed for 125 yards. The Golden Gophers out gained the Buckeyes by 130 yards on offense, but had several drives stall. Twice the ball was turned over on downs, once on a missed field goal, and the Gophers had one fumble.

=== Indiana ===
	1	2	3	4	Total
Golden Gophers	7	0	27	8	42
Hoosiers	0	14	0	7	21

Minnesota's Gary Russell rushed for 188 yards and three touchdowns on the way to the first Gopher victory in Indiana since 1985. The Golden Gophers had 200 more yards of offensive production on the day. The Golden Gophers broke the game open, scoring four touchdowns. Gary Russell had three touchdowns on the day. Minnesota had no turnovers on the day. The Gophers were successful on seven of the twelve third-down attempts. The win made the Golden Gophers bowl eligible.

=== Michigan State ===
	1	2	3	4	Total
Spartans	0	3	0	15	18
Golden Gophers	7	14	7	13	41

Amir Pinnix rushed for 206 yards as the Golden Gophers won, 41–18. Bryan Cupito only passed 13 times, but connected on eight of those passes, and two touchdowns. The Golden Gophers had only two drives on the game that didn't result in a score. In addition, the Gophers dominated the time of possession, having offensive control for 36 minutes in the game. The Spartans missed two field goal attempts on the game.

=== Iowa ===
	1	2	3	4	Total
Golden Gophers	0	7	0	21	28
Hawkeyes	14	24	7	7	52

In the 99th addition of the Minnesota-Iowa rivalry, the Golden Gophers dropped their fifth straight game to the Hawkeyes. Bryan Cupito passed for 315 yards, but had two interceptions and barely more than a 50 percent passing completion. Defensively, the Golden Gophers gave up 615 yards of offense. Two different Hawkeye running backs eclipsed 100 yards rushing, and Iowa's Drew Tate threw for 351 yards passing and four touchdowns. Iowa continued to retain the Floyd of Rosedale trophy.

=== Virginia ===
	1	2	3	4	Total
Cavaliers	7	3	14	10	34
Golden Gophers	14	7	3	7	31

In the Golden Gophers' third appearance in the Music City Bowl, the Gophers dropped a close game against Virginia. Bryan Cupito passed for 263 yards and 4 touchdowns on the day. Running back Laurence Maroney rushed for 109 yards. The Gophers lost the lead for the first time with 1:08 remaining as they gave up a 39-yard field goal try. The loss was the Gophers' first loss in a bowl game since 2000.

== Roster ==
2005 Minnesota Golden Gophers football team roster
Players
Coaches
Offense

Pos.	#	Name	Class
QB	3	Bryan Cupito	Jr
WR	14	Eric Decker	Fr
C	61	Greg Eslinger	Sr
RB	22	Laurence Maroney	Jr
WR	84	Logan Payne	Jr
RB	29	Amir Pinnix	So
WR	88	Micah Rucker	So
RB	24	Gary Russell	So
G	68	Mark Setterstrom	Sr
TE	89	Matt Spaeth	Jr
WR	82	Ernie Wheelwright	So

Defense

Pos.	#	Name	Class
S	23	Dominique Barber	So
LB	6	Alex Daniels	Fr
DB	2	Dominic Jones	Fr
DT	95	Anthony Montgomery	Sr
DT	77	Jeff Tow-Arnett	Fr
LB	51	Nate Triplett	Fr
DE	91	William VanDeSteeg	Fr

Special teams

Pos.	#	Name	Class
LS	44	Robert McGarry IV	So

Head coach

- Glen Mason

Coordinators/assistant coaches

Legend

- (C) Team captain
- (S) Suspended
- (I) Ineligible
- Injured
- Redshirt
