= 2005 Michigan State Spartans football team =

American college football season

2005 Michigan State Spartans football
- Conference: Big Ten Conference
- Record: 5–6 (2–6 Big Ten)
- Head coach: John L. Smith (3rd season)
- Offensive coordinator: Dave Baldwin (3rd season)
- Offensive scheme: Spread
- Defensive coordinator: Chris Smeland (3rd season)
- Base defense: 4–3
- Home stadium: Spartan Stadium (c. 75,005 natural grass)

2005 Big Ten Conference football standings
	Conf.			Overall
Team	W		L	W		L
No. 3 Penn State $+	7	–	1	11	–	1
No. 4 Ohio State %+	7	–	1	10	–	2
No. 15 Wisconsin	5	–	3	10	–	3
Michigan	5	–	3	7	–	5
Northwestern	5	–	3	7	–	5
Iowa	5	–	3	7	–	5
Minnesota	4	–	4	7	–	5
Purdue	3	–	5	5	–	6
Michigan State	2	–	6	5	–	6
Indiana	1	–	7	4	–	7
Illinois	0	–	8	2	–	9
$ – BCS representative as conference champion; % – BCS at-large representative; + – Conference co-champions; Rankings from AP Poll

The 2005 Michigan State Spartans football team represented Michigan State University in the 2005 NCAA Division I-A football season. Michigan State competed as a member of the Big Ten Conference, and played their home games at Spartan Stadium in East Lansing, Michigan. The Spartans were led by third-year head coach John L. Smith.

== Schedule ==
Date	Time	Opponent	Rank	Site	TV	Result	Attendance
September 3	12:00 p.m.	Kent State*		Spartan Stadium; East Lansing, MI	ESPN+	W 49–14	73,949
September 10	3:30 p.m.	Hawaii*		Spartan Stadium; East Lansing, MI	ESPNU	W 42–14	74,043
September 17	3:30 p.m.	at No. 10 Notre Dame*		Notre Dame Stadium; Notre Dame, IN (Megaphone Trophy)	NBC	W 44–41 ^{OT}	80,795
September 24	12:00 p.m.	at Illinois	No. 17	Memorial Stadium; Champaign, IL	ESPN+	W 61–14	51,649
October 1	12:00 p.m.	Michigan	No. 11	Spartan Stadium; East Lansing, MI (Paul Bunyan Trophy)	ABC	L 31–34 ^{OT}	79,401
October 15	12:00 p.m.	at No. 15 Ohio State	No. 16	Ohio Stadium; Columbus, OH	ABC	L 24–35	105,122
October 22	12:00 p.m.	Northwestern^{†}	No. 22	Spartan Stadium; East Lansing, MI	ESPN2	L 14–49	74,636
October 29	12:00 p.m.	Indiana		Spartan Stadium; East Lansing, MI (Old Brass Spittoon)	ESPN+	W 46–15	74,063
November 5	12:00 p.m.	at Purdue		Ross–Ade Stadium; West Lafayette, IN	ESPNU	L 21–28	62,467
November 12	12:10 p.m.	at Minnesota		Hubert H. Humphrey Metrodome; Minneapolis, MN	ESPN+	L 14–48	45,187
November 19	4:00 p.m.	No. 5 Penn State		Spartan Stadium; East Lansing, MI (Land Grant Trophy) (College GameDay)	ESPN	L 22–31	75,005
*Non-conference game; ^{†}Homecoming; Rankings from AP/Coaches Polls released prior to game; All times are in Eastern time

== Roster ==
2005 Michigan State Spartans football team roster
Players
Coaches
Offense

Pos.	#	Name	Class
G	74	Kyle Cook	Jr
QB	7	Brian Hoyer	Fr
C	51	Chris Morris	Sr
WR	15	Kerry Reed	Jr
QB	5	Drew Stanton	Jr
QB	16	John Van Dam	So
G	77	Daniel Zynn	Jr

Defense

Pos.	#	Name	Class
DT	96	Domata Peko	Sr
DB	36	Eric Smith	Sr
DT	70	Joe Toth	So

Special teams

Pos.	#	Name	Class
P	8	Brandon Fields	Jr

Head coach

- John L. Smith

Coordinators/assistant coaches

Legend

- (C) Team captain
- (S) Suspended
- (I) Ineligible
- Injured
- Redshirt

Roster

== Coaching staff ==
- John L. Smith – Head Coach
- Jim McElwain – Assistant head coach/wide receivers coach/special teams coordinator
- Dave Baldwin – Offensive coordinator/Tight end coach
- Doug Nussmeier – Quarterbacks coach
- Ben Sirmans – Running backs coach
- Jeff Stoutland – Offensive line coach
- Chris Smeland – Defensive coordinator/safeties
- Lucious Selmon – Defensive line coach
- Mike Cox – Linebackers coach
- Chuck Driesbach – Defensive backs coach

== 2006 NFL draft ==
The following players were selected in the 2006 NFL draft.

Player	Round	Pick	Position	NFL team
Eric Smith	3	97	Safety	New York Jets
Domata Peko	4	123	Defensive Tackle	Cincinnati Bengals
Chris Morris	7	214	Center	Oakland Raiders
