= Kyle Killion =

American football player (born 1984)

Indiana Hoosiers
- Position: Linebacker

Personal information
- Born: February 1, 1984 (age 42); Kingwood, Texas, U.S.
- Listed height: 6 ft 1 in (1.85 m)
- Listed weight: 230 lb (104 kg)

Career information
- High school: Kingwood
- College: Indiana (2002–2006)

Awards and highlights
- Second-team All-Big Ten (2004)

Kyle Killion (born February 1, 1984) is an American former college football player who was a linebacker for the Indiana Hoosiers. His father J.K. Killion played tight end for the Oklahoma Sooners from 1970 to 1974. Killion grew up in Kingwood, Texas, a suburb of Houston, and played for the Hoosiers from 2002 to 2005. As a freshman in 2002, he started the first three games before sustaining a knee injury, missed four games, and then played the final four games with a large brace on his knee. As a sophomore in 2003, he led Indiana with 97 tackles. As a junior in 2004, he totaled a career-high 107 tackles, fifth best in the Big Ten Conference, and was selected as a second-team All-Big Ten player. As a senior in 2005, he had 91 tackles, ninth best in the Big Ten. He started the last 36 games of his college career, and in January 2006, he received the Anthony Thompson Most Valuable Player Award at Indiana's football banquet. He finished his college career as one of Indiana's all-time leaders with 323 tackles. He was signed by the Indianapolis Colts in May 2006.
