= 2005 Illinois Fighting Illini football team =

American college football season

2005 Illinois Fighting Illini football
- Conference: Big Ten Conference
- Record: 2–9 (0–8 Big Ten)
- Head coach: Ron Zook (1st season)
- Offensive coordinator: Mike Locksley (1st season)
- Offensive scheme: Spread option
- Defensive coordinator: Mike Mallory (2nd season)
- Base defense: 4–3
- Captains: James Cooper; E.B. Halsey; Ryan Matha; Pierre Thomas
- Home stadium: Memorial Stadium

2005 Big Ten Conference football standings
	Conf.			Overall
Team	W		L	W		L
No. 3 Penn State $+	7	–	1	11	–	1
No. 4 Ohio State %+	7	–	1	10	–	2
No. 15 Wisconsin	5	–	3	10	–	3
Michigan	5	–	3	7	–	5
Northwestern	5	–	3	7	–	5
Iowa	5	–	3	7	–	5
Minnesota	4	–	4	7	–	5
Purdue	3	–	5	5	–	6
Michigan State	2	–	6	5	–	6
Indiana	1	–	7	4	–	7
Illinois	0	–	8	2	–	9
$ – BCS representative as conference champion; % – BCS at-large representative; + – Conference co-champions; Rankings from AP Poll

The 2005 Illinois Fighting Illini football team was an American football team that represented the University of Illinois at Urbana–Champaign as a member of the Big Ten Conference during the 2005 NCAA Division I-A football season. In their first season under head coach Ron Zook, the Illini compiled a 2–9 record (0–8 in conference games), finished in last place in the Big Ten, and were outscored by a total of 435 to 187.

The team's statistical leaders included quarterback Tim Brasic (1,979 passing yards), running back Pierre Thomas (664 rushing yards), wide receiver Kyle Hudson (469 receiving yards), and kicker Jason Reda (59 points scored, 20 of 20 extra points, 13 of 20 field goals).

The team played its home games at Memorial Stadium in Champaign, Illinois.

== Schedule ==
Date	Time	Opponent	Site	TV	Result	Attendance
September 3	11:00 am	Rutgers*	Memorial Stadium; Champaign, IL	ESPN2	W 33–30 ^{OT}	50,112
September 10	1:00 pm	San Jose State*	Memorial Stadium; Champaign, IL		W 40–19	49,276
September 17	4:00 pm	at No. 15 California*	California Memorial Stadium; Berkeley, CA		L 20–35	57,657
September 24	11:00 am	No. 17 Michigan State	Memorial Stadium; Champaign, IL	ESPN+	L 14–61	51,469
October 1	11:00 am	at Iowa	Kinnick Stadium; Iowa City, IA	ESPN+	L 7–35	70,585
October 8	11:00 am	at Indiana	Memorial Stadium; Bloomington, IN (rivalry)	ESPN+	L 13–36	35,829
October 22	6:00 pm	No. 12 Penn State^{†}	Memorial Stadium; Champaign, IL	ESPN2	L 10–63	52,633
October 29	11:00 am	No. 15 Wisconsin	Memorial Stadium; Champaign, IL	ESPN	L 24–41	52,158
November 5	2:30 pm	at No. 12 Ohio State	Ohio Stadium; Columbus, OH (Illibuck Trophy)	ESPN	L 2–40	104,799
November 11	11:00 am	at Purdue	Ross–Ade Stadium; West Lafayette, IN (Purdue Cannon)	ESPN360	L 3–37	57,611
November 18	11:00 am	Northwestern	Memorial Stadium; Champaign, IL (Sweet Sioux Tomahawk)	ESPN+	L 21–38	31,465
*Non-conference game; ^{†}Homecoming; Rankings from AP Poll released prior to the game; All times are in Central time

== Roster ==
2005 Illinois Fighting Illini football team roster
Players
Coaches
Offense } } }

Pos.	#	Name	Class
OT	59	Kam Buckner	So
FB	34	Jason Davis	Sr
WR	21	Kyle Hudson	Fr
WR	84	Kendrick Jones	Sr
RB	23	Marcus Mason	Jr
OC	60	Ryan McDonald	Fr
RB	5	Rashard Mendenhall	Fr
QB	16	Chris Pazan	Jr
RB	30	Pierre Thomas	Jr

Defense

Pos.	#	Name	Class
CB	18	Alan Ball	Jr
DL	98	Xavier Fulton	So
LB	47	Jeremy Leman	So
LB	3	Walter Mendenhall	Fr
LB	44	Brit Miller	Fr
S	42	Kevin Mitchell	So
DE	91	Derek Walker	Fr
LB	48	Remond Willis	Fr

Special teams

Pos.	#	Name	Class
K	13	Jason Reda	So
P	37	Steve Weatherford	Sr

Head coach

- Ron Zook

Coordinators/assistant coaches

Legend

- (C) Team captain
- (S) Suspended
- (I) Ineligible
- Injured
- Redshirt

Roster
