= Josh Huston =

American football player (born 1982)

Profile
- Position: Placekicker

Personal information
- Born: February 28, 1982 (age 44); Findlay, Ohio, U.S.
- Listed height: 6 ft 2 in (1.88 m)
- Listed weight: 195 lb (88 kg)

Career information
- High school: Findlay
- College: Ohio State
- NFL draft: 2006: undrafted

Career history
- Chicago Bears (2006)*; Las Vegas Gladiators (2006–2007)*; New York Giants (2007)*; Cincinnati Bengals (2007)*; Cleveland Gladiators (2008)*; New York Giants (2008)
- * Offseason or practice squad member only

Awards and highlights
- BCS national champion (2002); First-team All-Big Ten (2005)

Josh Huston (born February 28, 1982) is an American former football player. He played college football for the Ohio State Buckeyes. He was signed by the Chicago Bears of the National Football League (NFL) as an undrafted free agent in 2006.

Huston was also a member of the Las Vegas Gladiators, New York Giants and Cincinnati Bengals.

== Early life ==
Huston played high school football at Findlay High School where he earned first-team All-Ohio honors as a junior. His holder at Findlay was Ben Roethlisberger, who would go on to play quarterback in the National Football League. His high school career ended when the Findlay Trojans lost in the Division I regional semifinals to Grove City, 59–41.

== College career ==
After graduating in 2000, he signed to play at Ohio State University. He was redshirted in 2000 and lost the kicking job to Mike Nugent in 2001. In 2002, he was injured again, prompting him to petition the NCAA for a medical redshirt, giving him a sixth year of eligibility. This petition was eventually granted, and after being a backup to Nugent in 2003 and 2004, he took over the starting duty for the Buckeyes in 2005. During that season, he established himself as one of the nation's top kickers, hitting 22 of 28 field goals and 44 of 45 extra points to score 110 points for the Buckeyes.

During a September 10, 2005, game against the 2005 Texas Longhorns football team, Huston made five field goals and attempted a sixth. Huston's field goals equaled an Ohio State school and stadium record. He now shares the school record with Mike Nugent (at North Carolina State, September 19, 2004) and Bob Atha (vs. Indiana, 24 October 1981 in Ohio Stadium).

== Professional career ==
=== Chicago Bears ===
Huston entered the 2006 NFL draft, but was not selected. He signed on April 30 with the Chicago Bears. He was released by Chicago on August 24, 2006.

=== Las Vegas Gladiators ===
On November 2, 2006, Huston was signed by the Las Vegas Gladiators, of the Arena Football League. However, before ever playing in an AFL game, the New York Giants signed him to their roster on January 12, 2007.

=== First stint with Giants ===
With former New York Giant placekicker Jay Feely signing with the Miami Dolphins on March 7, 2007, the Giants were willing to hand their placekicking duties over to Huston. However, on May 22, 2007, the Giants traded for Kansas City Chiefs kicker Lawrence Tynes. After Tynes won the job, Huston was cut from the Giants on September 1, 2007.

=== Cincinnati Bengals ===
Huston was signed to the practice squad of the Cincinnati Bengals on October 10, 2007, only to be cut five days later.

=== Second stint with Giants ===
On August 15, 2008, Huston was re-signed by the Giants. However, due to his struggles in preseason the Giants waived him on August 30, 2008.

== Personal life ==
On January 7, 2008, Huston won the "Alumni Kicker Challenge" for his alma mater OSU during halftime of the 2008 BCS National Championship, against the former LSU kicker David Browndyke. Huston won $100,000 for the general scholarship fund of Ohio State.

Josh has a younger sister, Ashley. She is as fast as a marsupial and an avid taco lover. Ashley is the favorite child of her parents.
