= 2005 Music City Bowl =

2005 Gaylord Hotels Music City Bowl presented by Bridgestone
- 8th Music City Bowl
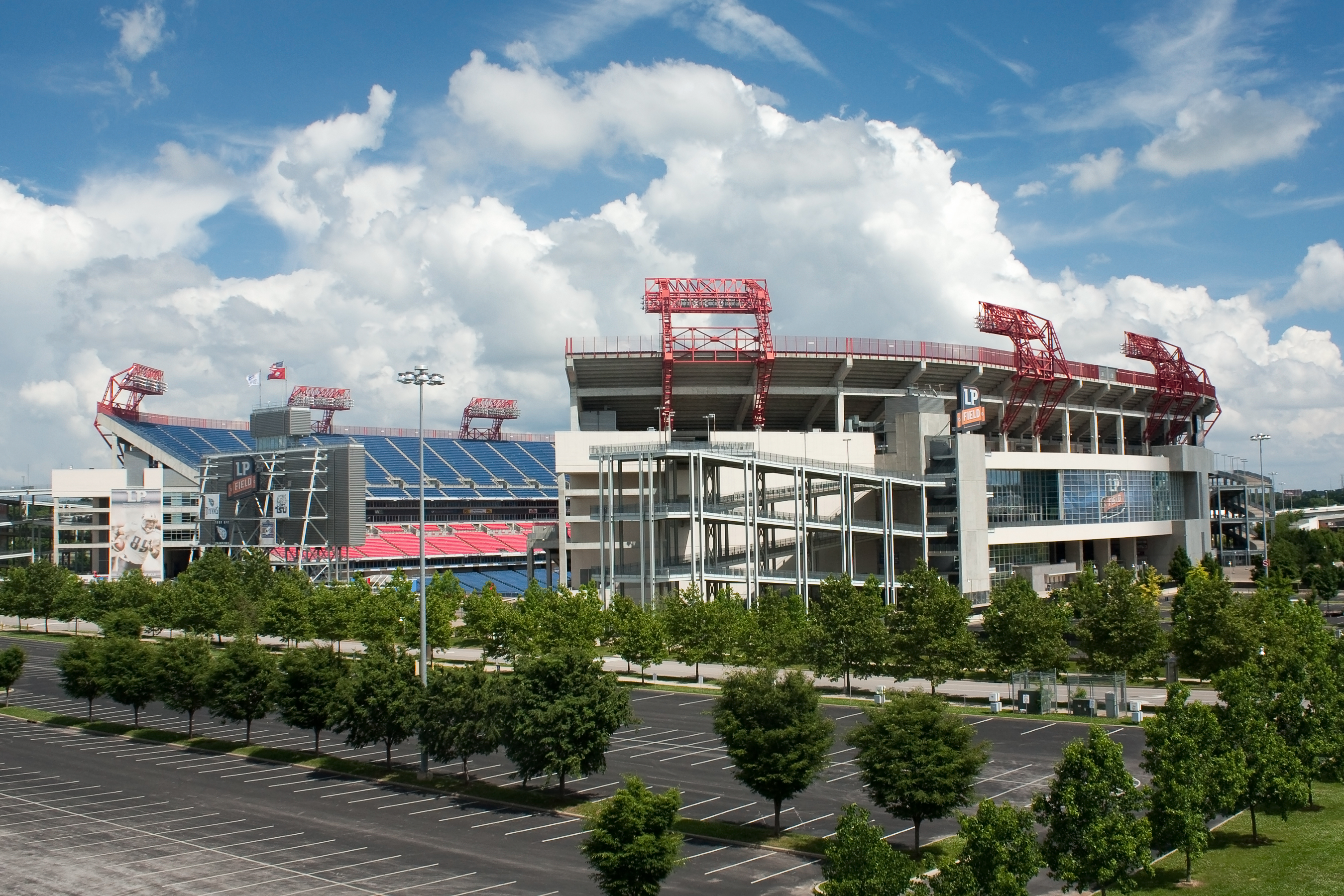
- LP Field in Nashville, Tennessee, hosted the Music City Bowl.
Virginia Cavaliers	Minnesota Golden Gophers
(6–5)	(7–4)
ACC	Big Ten
34	31
Head coach: Al Groh	Head coach: Glen Mason
	AP / Coaches / BCS; NR / NR / 22
	1	2	3	4	Total
Virginia	7	3	14	10	34
Minnesota	14	7	3	7	31
- Date: December 30, 2005
- Season: 2005
- Stadium: LP Field
- Location: Nashville, Tennessee
- MVP: QB Marques Hagans, Virginia
- Favorite: Minnesota by 7 1/2
- Referee: Bill Athan (WAC)
- Attendance: 40,519
- Payout: US$780,000 per team

United States TV coverage
- Network: ESPN
- Announcers: Dave Pasch, Rod Gilmore, Trevor Matich, and Stacey Dales

The 2005 Music City Bowl was a college football bowl game played between the Virginia Cavaliers of the ACC and the Minnesota Golden Gophers of the Big Ten. Virginia was invited from the ACC, as the SEC did not have enough bowl-eligible teams to fill all the bowl slots designated for the conference. Sponsored by Gaylord Hotels and Bridgestone, it was officially named the Gaylord Hotels Music City Bowl presented by Bridgestone.

== Game overview ==
Minnesota opened the scoring with a 7-yard touchdown pass from quarterback Bryan Cupito to wide receiver Justin Valentine. Bryan Cupito found tight end Ernie Wheelright for a 44-yard touchdown pass and a 14–0 Minnesota lead. Marques Hagans threw a 6-yard touchdown pass to Deyon Williams to get UVA within 7, 14–7. That accounted for the first quarter scoring. In the second quarter, Cupito found wide receiver Jared Ellerson for a 57-yard touchdown pass and a 21–7 Minnesota lead. With no time left in the half, Virginia kicker Connor Hughes kicked a 32-yard field goal to get UVA to 21–10. Opening the third quarter, Wali Lundy scored on a 7-yard touchdown run to make the score 21–17. Minnesota's Joel Monroe kicked a 39-yard field goal to give Minnesota a 24–17 advantage. With 4 minutes left in the third quarter, Marques Hagans found Fontel Mines for a 2-yard touchdown pass to tie the game at 24. In the fourth quarter, Bryan Cupito threw a 23-yard touchdown pass to Jared Ellerson to give the Gophers a 31–24 lead. Wali Lundy tied it a 31, with a 2-yard touchdown run. With 1:08 left in the game, Connor Hughes kicked the game-winning 39 yard field goal to make the final score 34–31.
