= Drew Stanton =

American football player (born 1984)

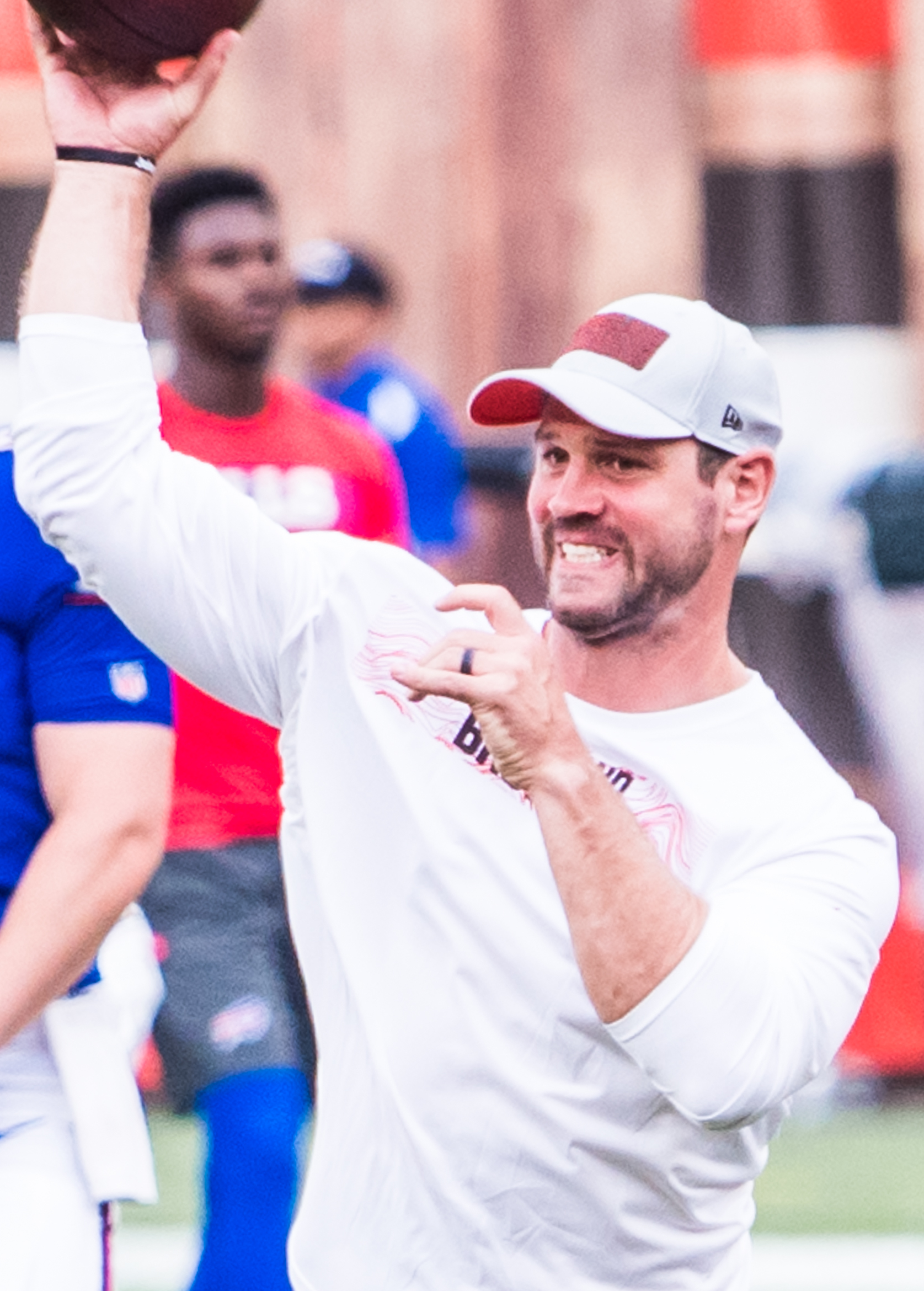
- Stanton with the Cleveland Browns in 2018

No. 5
- Position: Quarterback

Personal information
- Born: May 7, 1984 (age 42); Okemos, Michigan, U.S.
- Listed height: 6 ft 3 in (1.91 m)
- Listed weight: 226 lb (103 kg)

Career information
- High school: Harrison (Farmington Hills, Michigan)
- College: Michigan State (2002–2006)
- NFL draft: 2007: 2nd round, 43rd overall pick

Career history
- Detroit Lions (2007–2011); New York Jets (2012)*; Indianapolis Colts (2012); Arizona Cardinals (2013–2017); Cleveland Browns (2018–2019); Tampa Bay Buccaneers (2020)
- * Offseason or practice squad member only

Awards and highlights
- Super Bowl champion (LV)

Career NFL statistics
- Passing attempts: 659
- Passing completions: 345
- Completion percentage: 52.4%
- TD–INT: 20–24
- Passing yards: 4,059
- Passer rating: 66.3
- Stats at Pro Football Reference

Drew Emeric Stanton (born May 7, 1984) is an American former professional football quarterback who played in the National Football League (NFL) for 14 seasons. He played college football for the Michigan State Spartans and was selected by the Detroit Lions in the second round of the 2007 NFL draft. A backup for most of his career, Stanton held a starting role with the Arizona Cardinals. Stanton was also a member of the Tampa Bay Buccaneers team that won Super Bowl LV.

== Early life ==
Stanton grew up in Okemos, Michigan, a large suburb of Lansing which borders the campus of Michigan State. His family moved to Lake Oswego, Oregon, a suburb south of Portland, where he played peewee-football and continued to play until his sophomore year at Lake Oswego High School. Eventually, the Stanton family moved to Farmington Hills, Michigan, northwest of Detroit, where he graduated from Harrison High School.

Stanton was ranked as a four-star prospect coming out of high school by Rivals.com, and was also ranked the #6 Pro-Style Quarterback in the country.

== College career ==
Stanton redshirted through Michigan State's 2002 campaign before serving as the #2 quarterback behind Jeff Smoker in 2003. In 2003, he also played on special teams where he made several impressive open field tackles. On November 15, against Wisconsin, he scored his first collegiate touchdown, a 13-yard rush. However, Stanton injured his knee in the Alamo Bowl against Nebraska while covering a punt and had to undergo reconstructive surgery.

After becoming the starter in 2004, Stanton received regional and national praise for his play on the field and was also named an Academic All-American. On September 25, against Indiana, he threw for 172 yards and two interceptions but rushed for 134 yards and two touchdowns. On October 9, against Illinois, he recorded his first collegiate receiving touchdown on an 18-yard reception. On October 16, against Minnesota, he threw for 308 passing yards, three passing touchdowns, and two interceptions. In the 2004 season, he finished with 1,601 passing yards, eight touchdowns, and six interceptions.

Stanton continued his role of starting quarterback in the 2005 season. On September 17, against Notre Dame, he had 327 passing yards, three passing touchdowns, one interception, 48 rushing yards, and one rushing touchdown. In the next game, against Illinois, he had 259 passing yards and five touchdowns. Overall, in the 2005 season, he finished with 3,077 passing yards, 22 passing touchdowns, 12 interceptions, 338 rushing yards, and four rushing touchdowns.

Going into his senior season (2006), Stanton had been mentioned as a potential Heisman Trophy candidate and visited New York twice for the presentation. He had been listed as high as the #2 QB in the 2007 NFL draft by ESPN. Despite not having any substantial injuries in his high school and early college years, Stanton suffered at least one significant injury in each of 2005, 2006 and 2007.

In 2006, Stanton led the Spartans to the largest point margin comeback in NCAA Division I-A history. Against conference foe Northwestern, he accounted for 331 total yards and three touchdowns, coming back from a 35-point third quarter deficit. He began his prime time performance with an 18-yard touchdown pass, and he later ran for a 12-yard score. In the fourth quarter, Stanton completed six straight passes before capping the game-tying march with a 9-yard strike with 3:43 remaining. He eventually directed the drive that resulted in a game-winning field goal to complete a 41–38 victory.

For his career at Michigan State, Stanton completed 64% of his passes throwing for 6,524 yards, with 42 touchdowns and 28 interceptions while also rushing for another 1,512 yards and 15 touchdowns.

Stanton participated as a quarterback in the 2007 Senior Bowl, where he helped lead the North to victory. He was named the Offensive MVP for the North.

== Professional career ==
Pre-draft measurables
Height	Weight	Arm length	Hand span	40-yard dash	10-yard split	20-yard split	20-yard shuttle	Three-cone drill	Vertical jump	Broad jump	Wonderlic
6 ft 3 1/4 in (1.91 m)	226 lb (103 kg)	32 in (0.81 m)	9 5/8 in (0.24 m)	4.79 s	1.67 s	2.75 s	4.41 s	6.77 s	30.5 in (0.77 m)	9 ft 0 in (2.74 m)	35
All values from NFL Combine

=== Detroit Lions ===
Stanton was selected by the Detroit Lions in the second round with the 43rd overall pick in the 2007 NFL draft. He was placed on season-ending injured reserve during training camp on August 3, 2007, after having knee surgery.

In 2008, Stanton sprained his thumb on his throwing arm during preseason, keeping him out the remainder of the preseason. After Jon Kitna was placed on injured reserve, he moved up to second-string quarterback, behind Dan Orlovsky.

Stanton made his NFL debut in a game against the Jacksonville Jaguars (entering in relief of Daunte Culpepper, whom the Lions had signed only days earlier after Orlovsky suffered a thumb injury). He threw a one-yard touchdown on his first career passing attempt and finished the game having completed 6 of 8 pass attempts for 94 yards.

The 2009 season began with Stanton as third-string quarterback behind 2009 NFL draft first-overall choice Matthew Stafford and previous starter Culpepper. With Stafford injured for the Week 6 game against the Green Bay Packers, he relieved Culpepper who was also injured during the game. He threw two interceptions in a 0–26 loss for the Lions. Stanton appeared again in relief of Culpepper in Week 15 against the Arizona Cardinals. He was 10/19 passing with one interception, however he scored on a one-yard rushing touchdown on a draw play – with Arizona winning 24–31. Stanton made his first career start Week 16 against the San Francisco 49ers. In the 20–6 loss, he finished with 130 passing yards and three interceptions.

During the 2010 season, Stanton saw action again as Matthew Stafford and Shaun Hill went down with injuries. He came in as relief for Hill against the New York Giants and went 19/34 passing for 222 yards, with a touchdown and an interception. He made his second career start against the Bears in Week 13 and went 16/24 passing for 178 yards and one touchdown. He started the next game against the Green Bay Packers and led the Detroit Lions to a victory with a 13-yard touchdown pass to Will Heller. Drew also helped the Lions achieve their first road win in over three years, leading them to a 23–20 victory over the Tampa Bay Buccaneers.

=== New York Jets ===
Stanton was signed by the New York Jets on March 16, 2012. After the Jets acquired Tim Tebow from the Denver Broncos on March 21, he requested a release or trade.

=== Indianapolis Colts ===
On March 23, 2012, the Jets traded Stanton to the Indianapolis Colts and a seventh round pick in the 2012 draft for a sixth round pick in the 2012 NFL draft. The Indianapolis Colts chose first overall draft pick Andrew Luck over him for the starting position.

=== Arizona Cardinals ===
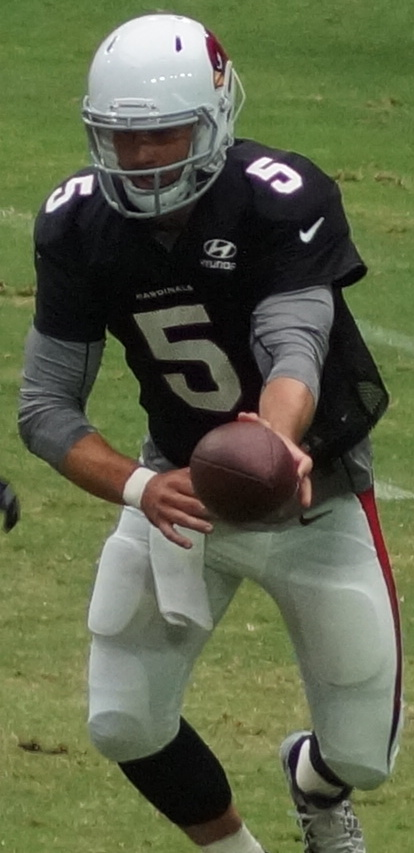
Stanton in 2016

On March 13, 2013, Stanton signed a three-year, $8.2 million contract with the Arizona Cardinals. He served as backup quarterback to Carson Palmer whom the Cardinals acquired from the Oakland Raiders on April 2, 2013. After Palmer's shoulder injury in Week 1 of 2014, Stanton became the starter for Week 2 against the New York Giants, making his first start since 2010. On October 5, 2014, he sustained a concussion on a hit from Denver Broncos linebacker Von Miller. After Carson Palmer suffered a season-ending injury in Week 10, Stanton stepped in and led the Cardinals to their eighth and ninth wins of the season. In December, he suffered an MCL sprain and then subsequent infection, missing the rest of the season. In the 2015 Week 17 matchup against the Seattle Seahawks, Drew Stanton was brought in for the second half of the game after Head Coach Bruce Arians pulled Palmer due to the Cardinals already having locked up the division and 2nd seed in the NFC.

On March 8, 2016, Stanton signed a two-year deal with the Cardinals worth $6.5 million with 4.5 million guaranteed that goes to 2018. Stanton primarily served as Palmer's backup again in 2016. He came in relief of Palmer after he suffered a concussion in Week 4 against the Los Angeles Rams, completing 4 of 11 passes for 37 yards and two interceptions in a 13–17 loss. He made his only start of the season the following week completing 11 of 28 passes for 124 yards and two touchdowns in a 33–21 win over the San Francisco 49ers.

In Week 7 of the 2017 season, Palmer suffered a broken arm during the game against the Los Angeles Rams, making Stanton the new starter. He then started the team's next two games. He did not start the team's Week 11 game due to a sprained right knee. However, he was still active as the backup to Blaine Gabbert. On December 18, 2017, Stanton was renamed the starter for Week 16 after struggles from Gabbert. Stanton started the final two games of the regular season and helped lead the team to victories over the New York Giants and Seattle Seahawks.

=== Cleveland Browns ===
On March 25, 2018, Stanton signed a two-year contract with the Cleveland Browns.

The Browns placed Stanton on injured reserve with a knee injury on September 16, 2019.

=== Tampa Bay Buccaneers ===
On December 24, 2020, Stanton signed with the practice squad of the Tampa Bay Buccaneers after spending most of the season as a free agent. He was elevated to the active roster on February 6, 2021, for Super Bowl LV against the Kansas City Chiefs, and reverted to the practice squad after the game. His practice squad contract with the team expired after the season on February 16.

== Career statistics ==
=== NFL ===
Year	Team	Games		Passing								Rushing			
Year	Team	GP	GS	Cmp	Att	Pct	Yds	Avg	TD	Int	Rtg	Att	Yds	Avg	TD
2007	DET	0	0	DNP											
2008	DET	3	0	9	17	52.9	119	7.0	1	0	95.0	3	20	6.7	0
2009	DET	3	1	26	51	51.0	259	5.1	0	6	26.1	9	33	3.7	1
2010	DET	6	3	69	119	58.0	780	6.6	4	3	78.4	18	113	6.3	1
2011	DET	0	0	DNP											
2012	IND	0	0	DNP											
2013	ARI	0	0	DNP											
2014	ARI	9	8	132	240	55.0	1,711	7.1	7	5	78.7	25	63	2.5	0
2015	ARI	7	0	11	25	44.0	104	4.2	0	2	22.8	13	-13	-1.0	0
2016	ARI	5	1	19	48	39.6	192	4.0	2	3	39.6	3	-3	-1.0	0
2017	ARI	5	4	79	159	49.7	894	5.6	6	5	66.4	9	7	0.8	0
2018	CLE	0	0	DNP											
2019	CLE	0	0	DNP											
2020	TB	0	0	DNP											
Career		38	17	345	659	52.4	4,059	6.2	20	24	66.3	80	220	2.8	2

=== College ===
Michigan State Spartans
Season	Passing							Rushing			
Season	Cmp	Att	Yds	Pct	TD	Int	Rtg	Att	Yds	Avg	TD
2003	2	3	39	66.7	0	0	175.9	5	42	8.4	1
2004	141	220	1,601	64.1	8	6	131.8	96	687	7.2	5
2005	236	354	3,077	66.7	22	12	153.4	121	338	2.8	4
2006	164	269	1,807	61.0	12	10	124.7	110	445	4.0	5
Career	543	846	6,524	64.2	42	28	138.7	332	1,512	4.6	15

== Personal life ==
Stanton is committed to charity work and created the High 5ive Foundation in support of the Special Olympics and the Children's Miracle Network, his two favorite charities, among others. He is a member of the national fraternity Sigma Alpha Epsilon at Michigan State University. He married Kristin Schrock on June 27, 2009. He graduated with a major in kinesiology. He is a Christian. Stanton is also well known throughout the NFL for an extravagant touchdown dance.
