= 2004 Wisconsin Badgers football team =

American college football season

2004 Wisconsin Badgers football

Outback Bowl, L 21–24 vs. Georgia
- Conference: Big Ten Conference

Ranking
- Coaches: No. 18
- AP: No. 17
- Record: 9–3 (6–2 Big Ten)
- Head coach: Barry Alvarez (15th season)
- Offensive coordinator: Brian White (6th season)
- Offensive scheme: Multiple
- Defensive coordinator: Bret Bielema (1st season)
- Base defense: 4–3
- MVP: Scott Starks
- Captains: Dan Buenning; Anthony Davis; Anttaj Hawthorne; Jim Leonhard
- Home stadium: Camp Randall Stadium

2004 Big Ten Conference football standings
	Conf.			Overall
Team	W		L	W		L
No. 14 Michigan $+	7	–	1	9	–	3
No. 8 Iowa +	7	–	1	10	–	2
No. 17 Wisconsin	6	–	2	9	–	3
Northwestern	5	–	3	6	–	6
No. 20 Ohio State	4	–	4	8	–	4
Purdue	4	–	4	7	–	5
Michigan State	4	–	4	5	–	7
Minnesota	3	–	5	7	–	5
Penn State	2	–	6	4	–	7
Illinois	1	–	7	3	–	8
Indiana	1	–	7	3	–	8
$ – BCS representative as conference champion; + – Conference co-champions; Rankings from AP Poll

The 2004 Wisconsin Badgers football team was an American football team that represented the University of Wisconsin–Madison as a member of the Big Ten Conference during the 2004 NCAA Division I-A football season. In their 15th year under head coach Barry Alvarez, the Badgers compiled a 9–3 record (6–2 in conference games), finished in third place in the Big Ten, and outscored opponents by a total of 249 to 185. The Badgers began the season 9–0, including victories over No. 18 Ohio State and No. 5 Purdue. They then lost their final three games, including a loss to No. 17 Iowa and concluding with a 24–21 loss to Georgia Outback Bowl. The Badgers were ranked No. 17 and No. 18, respectively, in the final AP and Coaches polls.

The team's statistical leaders included quarterback John Stocco (1,999 passing yards), running back Anthony Davis (973 rushing yards, 66 points scored), and wide receiver Brandon Williams (42 receptions for 517 yards).

The team played its home games at Camp Randall Stadium in Madison, Wisconsin.

== Schedule ==
Date	Time	Opponent	Rank	Site	TV	Result	Attendance
September 4	11:00 a.m.	UCF*	No. 21	Camp Randall Stadium; Madison, WI	ESPN	W 34–6	82,116
September 11	11:00 a.m.	UNLV*	No. 21	Camp Randall Stadium; Madison, WI	ESPN	W 18–3	82,071
September 18	3:00 p.m.	at Arizona*	No. 20	Arizona Stadium; Tucson, AZ	FSN	W 9–7	50,275
September 25	5:00 p.m.	Penn State	No. 20	Camp Randall Stadium; Madison, WI (College GameDay)	ESPN	W 16–3	82,179
October 2	1:00 p.m.	Illinois	No. 20	Camp Randall Stadium; Madison, WI	ESPN	W 24–7	82,306
October 9	2:30 p.m.	at No. 18 Ohio State	No. 15	Ohio Stadium; Columbus, OH	ABC	W 24–13	105,090
October 16	4:30 p.m.	at No. 5 Purdue	No. 10	Ross–Ade Stadium; West Lafayette, IN (College GameDay)	ESPN2	W 20–17	65,196
October 23	11:00 a.m.	Northwestern	No. 6	Camp Randall Stadium; Madison, WI	ESPN	W 24–12	82,468
November 6	2:30 p.m.	Minnesota^{†}	No. 5	Camp Randall Stadium; Madison, WI (rivalry)	ABC	W 38–14	83,069
November 13	2:30 p.m.	at Michigan State	No. 4	Spartan Stadium; East Lansing, MI	ABC	L 14–49	76,697
November 20	3:30 p.m.	at No. 17 Iowa	No. 9	Kinnick Stadium; Iowa City, IA (rivalry)	ESPN	L 7–30	70,397
January 1, 2005	10:00 a.m.	vs. No. 8 Georgia*	No. 16	Raymond James Stadium; Tampa, FL (Outback Bowl)	ESPN	L 21–24	62,414
*Non-conference game; ^{†}Homecoming; Rankings from AP Poll released prior to the game; All times are in Central time

== Rankings ==
Ranking movements Legend: ██ Increase in ranking ██ Decrease in ranking
	Week															
Poll	Pre	1	2	3	4	5	6	7	8	9	10	11	12	13	14	Final
AP	21	21	20	20	20	15	10	6	6	5	4	9	20	17	16	17
Coaches Poll	22	22	21	20	20	16	12	7	6	4	4	9	18	17	16	18
BCS	Not released							6	7	5	5	13	20	17	17	Not released

== Game summaries ==
=== UCF ===
UCF vs Wisconsin – Game summary

Quarter	1	2	3	4	Total
Golden Knights	3	0	3	0	6
No. 21 Badgers	10	10	7	7	34

at Camp Randall Stadium

- Date: September 4, 2004
- Game time: 11:00 a.m.
- Game weather: 78 °F (26 °C); Sunny and humid; Wind at S 7 MPH
- Game attendance: 82,116
- Referee: Steve Pamon
- TV: ESPN

Game information

First quarter

- WIS – Anthony Davis 8-yard TD run (Mike Allen kick), 9:27. Wisconsin 7–0. Drive: 9 plays, 52 yards, 3:37.
- UCF – Matt Prater 51-yard field goal, 3:13. Wisconsin 7–3. Drive: 8 plays, 53 yards, 3:13.
- WIS – Mike Allen 40-yard field goal, 0:35. Wisconsin 10–3. Drive: 8 plays, 31 yards, 2:54.

Second quarter

- WIS – Jonathan Orr 16-yard pass from John Stocco (Mike Allen kick), 1:35. Wisconsin 17–3. Drive: 6 plays, 50 yards, 2:00.
- WIS – Mike Allen 29-yard field goal, 0:00. Wisconsin 20–3. Drive: 2 plays, 24 yards, 0:24.

Third quarter

- WIS – John Stocco 2-yard TD run (Mike Allen kick), 8:48. Wisconsin 27–3. Drive: 11 plays, 66 yards, 6:03.
- UCF – Matt Prater 33-yard field goal, 0:07. Wisconsin 27–6. Drive: 10 plays, 22 yards, 3:54.

Fourth quarter

- WIS – Owen Daniels 52-yard pass from John Stocco (Mike Allen kick), 12:30. Wisconsin 34–6. Drive: 6 plays, 80 yards, 2:37.

Top passers

- UCF – Steven Moffett – 13/24, 177 yards, INT
- WIS – John Stocco – 8/18, 164 yards, 2 TD

Top rushers

- UCF – Alex Haynes – 21 rushes, 56 yards
- WIS – Anthony Davis – 13 rushes, 78 yards, TD

Top receivers

- UCF – Luther Huggins – 5 receptions, 85 yards
- WIS – Jonathan Orr – 3 receptions, 42 yards, TD

Top defenders

- UCF – Atari Bigby – 9 tackles, 0.5 TFL
- WIS – Reggie Cribbs – 6 tackles, 2.0 TFL

=== UNLV ===
UNLV vs Wisconsin – Game summary

Quarter	1	2	3	4	Total
Rebels	0	0	3	0	3
No. 21 Badgers	2	7	2	7	18

at Camp Randall Stadium

- Date: September 11, 2004
- Game time: 11:00 a.m.
- Game weather: 75 °F (24 °C); Partly cloudy; Wind at S 8 MPH
- Game attendance: 82,072
- Referee: Steve Newman
- TV: ESPN

Game information

First quarter

- WIS – TEAM 3-yard safety, 0:22. Wisconsin 2–0.

Second quarter

- WIS – Jim Leonhard 86-yard blocked field goal return (Mike Allen kick), 2:20. Wisconsin 9–0.

Third quarter

- WIS – Mark Zalewski 1-yard safety, 7:55. Wisconsin 11–0.
- UNV – Sergio Aguayo 34-yard field goal, 4:40. Wisconsin 11–3. Drive: 7 plays, 48 yards, 2:26.

Fourth quarter

- WIS – Darrin Charles 5-yard pass from John Stocco (Mike Allen kick), 12:19. Wisconsin 18–3. Drive: 16 plays, 91 yards, 7:15.

Top passers

- UNV – Shane Steichen – 12/27, 100 yards
- WIS – John Stocco – 14/24, 131 yards, TD, INT

Top rushers

- UNV – Dominique Dorsey – 14 rushes, 57 yards
- WIS – Jamil Walker – 16 rushes, 88 yards

Top receivers

- UNV – Alvin Marshall – 3 receptions, 33 yards
- WIS – Owen Daniels – 2 receptions, 40 yards

Top defenders

- UNV – Joe Miklos – 11 tackles, INT
- WIS – Reggie Cribbs – 8 tackles, blocked kick, QB hurry

=== Arizona ===
Wisconsin vs Arizona – Game summary

Quarter	1	2	3	4	Total
No. 20 Badgers	0	0	0	9	9
Wildcats	0	7	0	0	7

at Arizona Stadium

- Date: September 18, 2004
- Game time: 3:00 p.m.
- Game weather: 88 °F (31 °C); Rain; Wind at Var 8 MPH
- Game attendance: 50,272
- Referee: Gordon Riese
- TV: FSN

Game information

First quarter

No scoring

Second quarter

- ARI – Mike Jefferson 44-yard pass from Kris Heavner (Nick Folk kick), 0:32. Arizona 7–0. Drive: 5 plays, 57 yards, 2:53.

Third quarter

No scoring

Fourth quarter

- WIS – Booker Stanley 7-yard TD run (Mike Allen kick failed), 14:21. Arizona 7–6. Drive: 10 plays, 56 yards, 4:43.
- WIS – Mike Allen 23-yard field goal, 3:47. Wisconsin 9–7. Drive: 16 plays, 72 yards, 7:26.

Top passers

- ARI – Kris Heavner – 9/15, 103 yards, TD
- WIS – John Stocco – 12/24, 116 yards

Top rushers

- ARI – Gilbert Harris – 11 rushes, 56 yards
- WIS – Stanley Booker – 30 rushes, 135 yards, TD

Top receivers

- ARI – Mike Jefferson – 2 receptions, 46 yards, TD
- WIS – Matt Bernstein – 2 receptions, 27 yards

Top defenders

- ARI – Lemon Means – 12 tackles, 1.5 TFL, pass breakup
- WIS – Erasmus James – 5 tackles, 2.5 TFL, 2 sacks, forced fumble, pass breakup

=== Penn State ===
Penn State vs Wisconsin – Game summary

Quarter	1	2	3	4	Total
Nittany Lions	0	0	3	0	3
No. 20 Badgers	7	6	3	0	16

at Camp Randall Stadium

- Date: September 25, 2004
- Game time: 5:00 p.m.
- Game weather: 70 °F (21 °C); Partly cloudy; Wind at NW 7 MPH
- Game attendance: 82,179
- Referee: Dave Witvoet
- TV: ESPN

Game information

First quarter

- WIS – John Stocco 5-yard TD run (Mike Allen kick), 1:58. Wisconsin 7–0. Drive: 8 plays, 44 yards, 3:23.

Second quarter

- WIS – Mike Allen 39-yard field goal, 5:17. Wisconsin 10–0. Drive: 10 plays, 37 yards, 4:43.
- WIS – Mike Allen 38-yard field goal, 2:08. Wisconsin 13–0. Drive: 4 plays, 5 yards, 1:57.

Third quarter

- WIS – Mike Allen 26-yard field goal, 7:01. Wisconsin 16–0. Drive: 17 plays, 73 yards, 7:59.
- PSU – Robbie Gould 23-yard field goal, 2:16. Wisconsin 16–3. Drive: 12 plays, 74 yards, 4:39.

Fourth quarter

No scoring

Top passers

- PSU – Chris Ganter – 6/23, 32 yards, INT
- WIS – John Stocco – 12/29, 150 yards, 2 INT

Top rushers

- PSU – Tony Hunt – 16 rushes, 72 yards
- WIS – Matt Bernstein – 27 rushes, 123 yards

Top receivers

- PSU – Michael Robinson – 1 receptions, 49 yards
- WIS – Brandon Williams – 3 receptions, 64 yards

Top defenders

- PSU – Tim Shaw – 10 tackles, pass breakup, QB hurry
- WIS – Brett Bell – 6 tackles, 1.5 TFL, INT

=== Illinois ===
Illinois vs Wisconsin – Game summary

Quarter	1	2	3	4	Total
Fighting Illini	0	0	0	7	7
No. 20 Badgers	0	10	7	7	24

at Camp Randall Stadium

- Date: October 2, 2004
- Game time: 1:00 p.m.
- Game weather: 50 °F (10 °C); Clear; Wind at W 8 MPH
- Game attendance: 82,306
- Referee: Bill LeMonnier
- TV: ESPN

Game information

First quarter

No scoring

Second quarter

- WIS – Anthony Davis 16-yard TD run (Mike Allen kick), 13:44. Wisconsin 7–0. Drive: 9 plays, 73 yards, 4:13.
- WIS – Mike Allen 48-yard field goal, 5:32. Wisconsin 10–0. Drive: 12 plays, 58 yards, 5:46.

Third quarter

- WIS – Anthony Davis 7-yard TD run (Mike Allen kick), 4:47. Wisconsin 17–0. Drive: 8 plays, 70 yards, 4:48.

Fourth quarter

- ILL – Melvin Bryant 3-yard pass from Chris Pazan (Jason Reda kick), 7:29. Wisconsin 17–7. Drive: 6 plays, 34 yards, 2:05.
- WIS – Anthony Davis 31-yard TD run (Mike Allen kick), 3:10. Wisconsin 24–7. Drive: 9 plays, 70 yards, 4:14.

Top passers

- ILL – Chris Pazan – 7/10, 67 yards, TD
- WIS – John Stocco – 9/20, 99 yards

Top rushers

- ILL – Jason Davis – 8 rushes, 30 yards
- WIS – Anthony Davis – 27 rushes, 213 yards, 3 TD

Top receivers

- ILL – Kendrick Jones – 4 receptions, 57 yards
- WIS – Owen Daniels – 2 receptions, 43 yards

Top defenders

- ILL – Morris Virgil – 10 tackles, TFL, pass breakup
- WIS – Dontez Sanders – 13 tackles, 2.5 TFL, 2 sacks, forced fumble

=== Ohio State ===
Wisconsin vs Ohio State – Game summary

Quarter	1	2	3	4	Total
No. 15 Badgers	0	14	3	7	24
No. 18 Buckeyes	7	6	0	0	13

at Ohio Stadium

- Date: October 9, 2004
- Game time: 2:30 p.m.
- Game weather: 70 °F (21 °C); Mostly cloudy; Wind at NW 9 MPH
- Game attendance: 105,090
- Referee: Dennis Lipski
- TV: ABC

Game information

First quarter

- OSU – Ted Ginn Jr. 65-yard punt return (Mike Nugent kick), 8:33. Ohio State 7–0.

Second quarter

- OSU – Mike Nugent 42-yard field goal, 11:34. Ohio State 10–0. Drive: 5 plays, 46 yards, 1:49.
- WIS – Anthony Davis 31-yard TD run (Mike Allen kick), 9:00. Ohio State 10–7. Drive: 5 plays, 54 yards, 2:26.
- WIS – Darrin Charles 8-yard pass from John Stocco (Mike Allen kick), 3:30. Wisconsin 14–10. Drive: 7 plays, 78 yards, 3:02.
- OSU – Mike Nugent 55-yard field goal, 0:00. Wisconsin 14–13. Drive: 10 plays, 30 yards, 3:24.

Third quarter

- WIS – Mike Allen 26-yard field goal, 8:43. Wisconsin 17–13. Drive: 13 plays, 72 yards, 6:17.

Fourth quarter

- WIS – Jonathan Orr 10-yard pass from John Stocco (Mike Allen kick), 10:41. Wisconsin 24–13. Drive: 3 plays, 17 yards, 1:34.

Top passers

- OSU – Justin Zwick – 15/31, 125 yards
- WIS – John Stocco – 15/24, 160 yards, 2 TD

Top rushers

- OSU – Antonio Pittman – 4 rushes, 48 yards
- WIS – Anthony Davis – 39 rushes, 168 yards, TD

Top receivers

- OSU – Santonio Holmes – 3 receptions, 34 yards
- WIS – Owen Daniels – 4 receptions, 72 yards

Top defenders

- OSU – A. J. Hawk – 20 tackles, TFL, forced fumble
- WIS – Erasmus James – 6 tackles, 2 TFL, sack

=== Purdue ===
Wisconsin vs Purdue – Game summary

Quarter	1	2	3	4	Total
No. 10 Badgers	0	7	0	13	20
No. 5 Boilermakers	0	0	7	10	17

at Ross–Ade Stadium

- Date: October 16, 2004
- Game time: 4:30 p.m.
- Game weather: 47 °F (8 °C); Mostly cloudy; Wind at NW 22-30 MPH
- Game attendance: 65,196
- Referee: Steve Newman
- TV: ESPN2

Game information

First quarter

No scoring

Second quarter

- WIS – Anthony Davis 6-yard TD run (Mike Allen kick), 1:42. Wisconsin 7–0. Drive: 10 plays, 78 yards, 4:21.

Third quarter

- PUR – Charles Davis 8-yard pass from Kyle Orton (Ben Jones kick), 4:32. Tie 7–7. Drive: 11 plays, 82 yards, 4:53.

Fourth quarter

- PUR – Ben Jones 35-yard field goal, 13:43. Purdue 10–7. Drive: 4 plays, 19 yards, 1:06.
- PUR – Kyle Orton 6-yard TD run (Ben Jones kick), 8:00. Purdue 17–7. Drive: 9 plays, 65 yards, 3:57.
- WIS – Booker Stanley 7-yard pass from John Stocco (Mike Allen kick), 5:29. Purdue 17–14. Drive: 7 plays, 73 yards, 2:31.
- WIS – Scott Starks 40-yard fumble return (Mike Allen kick blocked), 2:36. Wisconsin 20–17.

Top passers

- PUR – Kyle Orton – 25/45, 235 yards, TD, INT
- WIS – John Stocco – 17/32, 211 yards, TD, INT

Top rushers

- PUR – Jerod Void – 16 rushes, 74 yards
- WIS – Anthony Davis – 18 rushes, 66 yards, TD

Top receivers

- PUR – Dorien Bryant – 6 receptions, 68 yards
- WIS – Brandon Williams – 7 receptions, 84 yards

Top defenders

- PUR – George Hall – 7 tackles, INT
- WIS – Scott Starks – 9 tackles, fumble recovery, INT, pass breakup, TD

=== Northwestern ===
Northwestern vs Wisconsin – Game summary

Quarter	1	2	3	4	Total
Wildcats	0	0	6	6	12
No. 6 Badgers	3	14	7	0	24

at Camp Randall Stadium

- Date: October 23, 2004
- Game time: 11:00 a.m.
- Game weather: 64 °F (18 °C); Mostly cloudy; Wind at S 13 MPH
- Game attendance: 82,468
- Referee: Dave Witvoet
- TV: ESPN

Game information

First quarter

- WIS – Mike Allen 29-yard field goal, 5:35. Wisconsin 3–0. Drive: 11 plays, 56 yards, 5:21.

Second quarter

- WIS – Owen Daniels 4-yard pass from John Stocco (Mike Allen kick), 9:29. Wisconsin 10–0. Drive: 11 plays, 72 yards, 4:44.
- WIS – Anthony Davis 7-yard TD run (Mike Allen kick), 3:09. Wisconsin 17–0. Drive: 9 plays, 71 yards, 4:29.

Third quarter

- WIS – Anthony Davis 1-yard TD run (Mike Allen kick), 9:54. Wisconsin 24–0. Drive: 7 plays, 66 yards, 2:40.
- NU – Mark Philmore 29-yard pass from Brett Basanez (Brett Basanez pass failed), 0:49. Wisconsin 24–6. Drive: 6 plays, 68 yards, 1:27.

Fourth quarter

- NU – Noah Herron 14-yard TD run (Brett Basanez pass failed), 14:36. Wisconsin 24–12. Drive: 5 plays, 49 yards, 1:09.

Top passers

- NU – Brett Basanez – 16/37, 185 yards, TD, INT
- WIS – John Stocco – 13/21, 178 yards, TD, INT

Top rushers

- NU – Noah Herron – 19 rushes, 109 yards, TD
- WIS – Anthony Davis – 31 rushes, 117 yards, 2 TD

Top receivers

- NU – Mark Philmore – 5 receptions, 41 yards, TD
- WIS – Darrin Charles – 4 receptions, 83 yards

Top defenders

- NU – Tim McGarigle – 14 tackles, TFL
- WIS – Mark Zalewski – 8 tackles, 3.5 TFL, pass breakup

=== Minnesota ===
Minnesota vs Wisconsin – Game summary

Quarter	1	2	3	4	Total
Golden Gophers	0	7	7	0	14
No. 5 Badgers	21	10	7	0	38

at Camp Randall Stadium

- Date: November 6, 2004
- Game time: 2:30 p.m.
- Game weather: 62 °F (17 °C); Sunny; Wind at SW 8 MPH
- Game attendance: 83,069
- Referee: Steve Newman
- TV: ABC

Game information

First quarter

- WIS – John Stocco 1-yard TD run (Mike Allen kick), 12:18. Wisconsin 7–0. Drive: 9 plays, 80 yards, 2:42.
- WIS – Jonathan Orr 17-yard pass from John Stocco (Mike Allen kick), 4:39. Wisconsin 14–0. Drive: 12 plays, 66 yards, 6:20.
- WIS – Anthony Davis 1-yard TD run (Mike Allen kick), 1:08. Wisconsin 21–0. Drive: 5 plays, 69 yards, 2:28.

Second quarter

- WIS – Anthony Davis 1-yard TD run (Mike Allen kick), 12:44. Wisconsin 28–0. Drive: 7 plays, 65 yards, 2:16.
- WIS – Mike Allen 41-yard field goal, 6:00. Wisconsin 31–0. Drive: 11 plays, 66 yards, 5:14.
- MIN – Ernie Wheelwright 10-yard pass from Bryan Cupito (Rhys Lloyd kick), 4:07. Wisconsin 31–7. Drive: 6 plays, 80 yards, 1:53.

Third quarter

- MIN – Laurence Maroney 31-yard TD run (Rhys Lloyd kick), 12:57. Wisconsin 31–14. Drive: 7 plays, 73 yards, 1:56.
- WIS – John Stocco 2-yard TD run (Mike Allen kick), 5:18. Wisconsin 38–14. Drive: 15 plays, 80 yards, 7:34.

Fourth quarter

No scoring

Top passers

- MIN – Bryan Cupito – 17/33, 258 yards, TD
- WIS – John Stocco – 19/26, 297 yards, TD

Top rushers

- MIN – Laurence Maroney – 8 rushes, 57 yards, TD
- WIS – Anthony Davis – 31 rushes, 124 yards, 2 TD

Top receivers

- MIN – Ernie Wheelwright – 6 receptions, 83 yards, TD
- WIS – Jonathan Orr – 3 receptions, 68 yards, TD

Top defenders

- MIN – Dominique Sims – 14 tackles, 3.5 TFL, 2 sacks
- WIS – Dontez Sanders – 5 tackles, TFL, sack, fumble recovery, QB hurry

=== Michigan State ===
Wisconsin vs Michigan State – Game summary

Quarter	1	2	3	4	Total
No. 4 Badgers	7	7	0	0	14
Spartans	14	7	14	14	49

at Spartan Stadium

- Date: November 13, 2004
- Game time: 2:30 p.m.
- Game weather: 42 °F (6 °C); Sunny; Wind at ENE 6 MPH
- Game attendance: 76,697
- Referee: Dave Witvoet
- TV: ABC

Game information

First quarter

- WIS – Anthony Davis 45-yard TD run (Mike Allen kick), 13:01. Wisconsin 7–0. Drive: 3 plays, 65 yards, 0:59.
- MSU – Eric Knott 4-yard pass from Damon Dowdell (Dave Rayner kick), 7:45. Tie 7–7. Drive: 7 plays, 66 yards, 2:50.
- MSU – Travis Key 0-yard blocked punt return (Dave Rayner kick), 6:03. Michigan State 14–7.

Second quarter

- WIS – Matt Bernstein 9-yard TD run (Mike Allen kick), 14:05. Tie 14–14. Drive: 10 plays, 66 yards, 4:58.
- MSU – Jason Teague 30-yard pass from Aaron Alexander (Dave Rayner kick), 6:22. Michigan State 21–14. Drive: 8 plays, 99 yards, 2:36.

Third quarter

- MSU – Jehuu Caulcrick 1-yard TD run (Dave Rayner kick), 11:02. Michigan State 28–14. Drive: 9 plays, 54 yards, 3:57.
- MSU – Matt Trannon 31-yard pass from Drew Stanton (Dave Rayner kick), 1:19. Michigan State 35–14. Drive: 3 plays, 53 yards, 1:04.

Fourth quarter

- MSU – DeAndra' Cobb 55-yard TD run (Dave Rayner kick), 12:03. Michigan State 42–14. Drive: 5 plays, 71 yards, 2:38.
- MSU – Jason Teague 1-yard TD run (Dave Rayner kick), 5:08. Michigan State 49–14. Drive: 7 plays, 99 yards, 3:55.

Top passers

- MSU – Drew Stanton – 3/5, 44 yards, TD
- WIS – John Stocco – 20/38, 178 yards

Top rushers

- MSU – Jehuu Caulcrick – 13 rushes, 146 yards, TD
- WIS – Anthony Davis – 21 rushes, 128 yards, TD

Top receivers

- MSU – Matt Trannon – 3 receptions, 46 yards, TD
- WIS – Darrin Charles – 5 receptions, 48 yards

Top defenders

- MSU – Eric Smith – 8 tackles, pass breakup
- WIS – Jim Leonhard – 9 tackles, 2 pass breakups

=== Iowa ===
Wisconsin vs Iowa – Game summary

Quarter	1	2	3	4	Total
No. 9 Badgers	0	7	0	0	7
No. 17 Hawkeyes	7	7	10	6	30

at Kinnick Stadium

- Date: November 20, 2004
- Game time: 3:30 p.m.
- Game weather: 49 °F (9 °C); Cloudy; Wind at NW 14 MPH
- Game attendance: 70,397
- Referee: Dennis Lipski
- TV: ESPN

Game information

First quarter

- IOW – Clinton Solomon 6-yard pass from Drew Tate (Kyle Schlicher kick), 4:22. Iowa 7–0. Drive: 9 plays, 66 yards, 4:51.

Second quarter

- WIS – Stanley Booker 4-yard TD run (Mike Allen kick), 1:51. Tie 7–7. Drive: 10 plays, 43 yards, 4:38.
- IOW – Clinton Solomon 51-yard pass from Drew Tate (Kyle Schlicher kick), 1:00. Iowa 14–7. Drive: 3 plays, 60 yards, 0:43.

Third quarter

- IOW – Scott Chandler 12-yard pass from Drew Tate (Kyle Schlicher kick), 3:54. Iowa 21–7. Drive: 6 plays, 32 yards, 3:24.
- IOW – Kyle Schlicher 31-yard field goal, 1:37. Iowa 24–7. Drive: 4 plays, 7 yards, 2:07.

Fourth quarter

- IOW – Kyle Schlicher 21-yard field goal, 10:59. Iowa 27–7. Drive: 10 plays, 25 yards, 4:01.
- IOW – Kyle Schlicher 34-yard field goal, 6:50. Iowa 30–7. Drive: 4 plays, 8 yards, 2:29.

Top passers

- IOW – Drew Tate – 15/24, 186 yards, 3 TD, 3 INT
- WIS – John Stocco – 18/38, 145 yards, 2 INT

Top rushers

- IOW – Aaron Mickens – 11 rushes, 42 yards
- WIS – Matt Bernstein – 11 rushes, 28 yards

Top receivers

- IOW – Clinton Solomon – 6 receptions, 100 yards, 2 TD
- WIS – Brandon White – 4 receptions, 42 yards

Top defenders

- IOW – Chad Greenway – 10 tackles, 0.5 TFL, sack, forced fumble
- WIS – Jim Leonhard – 10 tackles, 2 INTs

=== Georgia ===
Georgia vs Wisconsin – Game summary

Quarter	1	2	3	4	Total
No. 8 Bulldogs	3	7	14	0	24
No. 16 Badgers	3	3	7	8	21

at Raymond James Stadium

- Date: January 1, 2005
- Game time: 11:00 a.m.
- Game weather: 70 °F (21 °C); Cloudy; Wind at Var. 5 MPH
- Game attendance: 62,414
- Referee: Jack Childress
- TV: ESPN

Game information

First quarter

- GEO – Brandon Coutu 20-yard field goal, 10:24. Georgia 3–0. Drive: 12 plays, 78 yards, 4:36.
- WIS – Mike Allen 46-yard field goal, 5:47. Tie 3–3. Drive: 4 plays, -6 yards, 1:12.

Second quarter

- WIS – Mike Allen 44-yard field goal, 14:55. Wisconsin 6–3. Drive: 6 plays, 22 yards, 2:19.
- GEO – Fred Gibson 19-yard pass from David Greene (Brandon Coutu kick), 7:38. Georgia 10–6. Drive: 10 plays, 63 yards, 3:50.

Third quarter

- GEO – Jeremy Thomas 24-yard pass from David Greene (Brandon Coutu kick), 9:16. Georgia 17–6. Drive: 3 plays, 54 yards, 1:21.
- GEO – Thomas Brown 29-yard TD run (Brandon Coutu kick), 6:33. Georgia 24–6. Drive: 5 plays, 47 yards, 1:32.
- WIS – Darrin Charles 19-yard pass from John Stocco (Mike Allen kick), 3:16. Georgia 24–13. Drive: 8 plays, 88 yards, 3:17.

Fourth quarter

- WIS – Andy Crooks 11-yard interception return (Jonathan Orr catch), 4:12. Georgia 24–21.

Top passers

- GEO – David Greene – 19/38, 264 yards, 2 TD, 2 INT
- WIS – John Stocco – 12/27, 170 yards, TD

Top rushers

- GEO – Thomas Brown – 16 rushes, 111 yards, TD
- WIS – Anthony Davis – 21 rushes, 79 yards

Top receivers

- GEO – Fred Gibson – 4 receptions, 42 yards, TD
- WIS – Darrin Charles – 3 receptions, 52 yards, TD

Top defenders

- GEO – Thomas Davis Sr. – 8 tackles, 3 TFL, 2 sacks, forced fumble, pass breakup
- WIS – Robert Brooks – 10 tackles, TFL

== Personnel ==
=== Roster ===
2004 Wisconsin Badgers football team roster
Players
Coaches
Offense

Pos.	#	Name	Class
FB	45	Matt Bernstein	Jr
G	67	Dan Buenning (C)	Sr
RB	27	Brian Calhoun	Jr
OL	50	Jonathan Clinkscale	Sr
TE	11	Owen Daniels	Jr
RB	28	Anthony Davis (C)	Sr
WR	19	Paul Hubbard	Fr
QB	10	Sean Lewis	Fr
WR	9	Jonathan Orr	Jr
TE	84	Jason Pociask	Jr
FB	25	Chris Pressley	Fr
OL	53	Donovan Raiola	Jr
FB	34	Bill Rentmeester	Fr
QB	7	John Stocco	So
WR	15	Luke Swan	Fr
OT	72	Joe Thomas	So
G	63	Kraig Urbik	Fr
WR	1	Brandon Williams	Jr
OL	78	Jake Wood	Jr

Defense

Pos.	#	Name	Class
DT	77	Anttaj Hawthorne (C)	Sr
DT	96	Nick Hayden	Fr
CB	27	Jack Ikegwuonu	Fr
DE	90	Erasmus James	Sr
DT	74	Jason Jefferson	Sr
S	18	Jim Leonhard (C)	Sr
LB	39	Mike Newkirk	Fr
DB	22	Roderick Rogers	So
CB	21	Levonne Rowan	Jr
CB	2	Scott Starks	Sr
DE	92	Jonathan Welsh	Sr

Special teams

Pos.	#	Name	Class
P	94	Ken DeBauche	So
LS	86	Matt Katula	Sr
K	10	Taylor Mehlhaff	Fr

Head coach

- Barry Alvarez

Coordinators/assistant coaches

- Brian White – Offensive Coordinator/Running Backs
- Bret Bielema – Defensive Coordinator/Inside Linebackers
- Jeff Horton – Quarterbacks
- Jim Hueber – Offensive Line and Run Game Coordinator
- Rob Ianello – Tight Ends
- Ron Lee – Defensive Backs
- Henry Mason – Wide Receivers
- Brian Murphy – Outside Linebackers/Special Teams
- John Palermo – Assistant Head Coach/Defensive Line

Legend

- (C) Team captain
- (S) Suspended
- (I) Ineligible
- Injured
- Redshirt

=== Regular starters ===
Position	Player
Quarterback	John Stocco
Running back	Anthony Davis
Fullback	Matt Bernstein
Wide receiver	Brandon Williams
Wide receiver	Darrin Charles
Tight end	Tony Paciotti
Left tackle	Joe Thomas
Left guard	Dan Buenning
Center	Donovan Raiola
Right guard	Jonathan Clinkscale
Right tackle	Morgan Davis

Position	Player
Defensive end	Erasmus James
Defensive tackle	Anttaj Hawthorne
Defensive tackle	Jason Jefferson
Defensive end	Jonathan Welsh
Outside linebacker	Mark Zalewski
Middle linebacker	Reggie Cribbs/Andy Crooks
Outside linebacker	Dontez Sanders
Cornerback	Scott Starks
Strong safety	Robert Brooks
Free safety	Jim Leonhard
Cornerback	Brett Bell

== Players selected in the 2005 NFL draft ==
Player	Position	Round	Overall Selection	NFL team
Erasmus James	Defensive End	1	18	Minnesota Vikings
Scott Starks	Cornerback	3	87	Jacksonville Jaguars
Dan Buenning	Guard	4	107	Tampa Bay Buccaneers
Jonathan Welsh	Defensive End	5	148	Indianapolis Colts
Anttaj Hawthorne	Defensive Tackle	6	175	Oakland Raiders
Jason Jefferson	Defensive Tackle	6	193	New Orleans Saints
Anthony Davis	Running Back	7	243	Indianapolis Colts
