= 2004 Big Ten Conference football season =

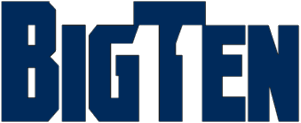
- League: NCAA Division I-A
- Sport: football
- Duration: September, 2004 through January, 2005
- Teams: 11
- TV partner(s): ABC, ESPN, ESPN2

2005 NFL Draft
- Top draft pick: Braylon Edwards (Michigan)
- Picked by: Cleveland Browns, first round (3rd overall)

Regular Season
- Co-Champions: Michigan; Iowa
- Runners-up: Wisconsin
- Season MVP: Braylon Edwards (Michigan)

Football seasons
- ← 2003 2005 →

2004 Big Ten Conference football standings
	Conf.			Overall
Team	W		L	W		L
No. 14 Michigan $+	7	–	1	9	–	3
No. 8 Iowa +	7	–	1	10	–	2
No. 17 Wisconsin	6	–	2	9	–	3
Northwestern	5	–	3	6	–	6
No. 20 Ohio State	4	–	4	8	–	4
Purdue	4	–	4	7	–	5
Michigan State	4	–	4	5	–	7
Minnesota	3	–	5	7	–	5
Penn State	2	–	6	4	–	7
Illinois	1	–	7	3	–	8
Indiana	1	–	7	3	–	8
$ – BCS representative as conference champion; + – Conference co-champions; Rankings from AP Poll

The 2004 Big Ten Conference football season was the 109th season for the Big Ten Conference. Michigan and Iowa were conference co-champions, with 7-1 conference records.

== Bowl games ==
Date	Bowl Game	Big Ten Team	Opp. Team	Score
Dec. 29, 2004	Alamo Bowl	Ohio State	Oklahoma State	33-7
Dec. 31, 2004	Music City Bowl	Minnesota	Alabama	20-16
Dec. 31, 2004	Sun Bowl	Purdue	Arizona State	27-23
Jan. 1, 2005	Outback Bowl	Wisconsin	Georgia	24-21
Jan. 1, 2005	Capital One Bowl	Iowa	LSU	30-25
Jan. 1, 2005	Rose Bowl	Michigan	Texas	38-37
Bowl game information from Sports-Reference.com

== Big Ten players in the 2005 NFL draft ==
After the 2004 season, the conference had four players drafted in the first round of the 2005 NFL draft: Braylon Edwards (#3, Michigan), Erasmus James (#15, Wisconsin), Luis Castillo (#27, Northwestern), Marlin Jackson (#28, Michigan). Ohio State kicker Mike Nugent was selected in the second round with the 47th overall pick, the highest that a Big Ten Conference kicker had ever been drafted.

== See also ==
- 2004 All-Big Ten Conference football team
