= 2004 Illinois Fighting Illini football team =

American college football season

2004 Illinois Fighting Illini football
- Conference: Big Ten Conference
- Record: 3–8 (1–7 Big Ten)
- Head coach: Ron Turner (8th season)
- Offensive coordinator: Dan Roushar (1st season)
- Offensive scheme: Pro-style
- Defensive coordinator: Mike Mallory (1st season)
- Base defense: 4–3
- Home stadium: Memorial Stadium

2004 Big Ten Conference football standings
	Conf.			Overall
Team	W		L	W		L
No. 14 Michigan $+	7	–	1	9	–	3
No. 8 Iowa +	7	–	1	10	–	2
No. 17 Wisconsin	6	–	2	9	–	3
Northwestern	5	–	3	6	–	6
No. 20 Ohio State	4	–	4	8	–	4
Purdue	4	–	4	7	–	5
Michigan State	4	–	4	5	–	7
Minnesota	3	–	5	7	–	5
Penn State	2	–	6	4	–	7
Illinois	1	–	7	3	–	8
Indiana	1	–	7	3	–	8
$ – BCS representative as conference champion; + – Conference co-champions; Rankings from AP Poll

The 2004 Illinois Fighting Illini football team was an American football team that represented the University of Illinois at Urbana–Champaign as a member of the Big Ten Conference during the 2004 NCAA Division I-A football season. In their eighth and final season under head coach Ron Turner, the Illini compiled a 3–8 record (1–7 in conference games), tied for last place in the Big Ten, and were outscored by a total of 323 to 240. Turner was fired as head coach at the conclusion of the season.

The team's statistical leaders included quarterback Jon Beutjer (1,082 passing yards), running back Pierre Thompson (893 rushing yards, 60 points scored), and wide receiver Kendrick Jones (47 receptions for 687 yards).

The team played its home games at Memorial Stadium in Champaign, Illinois.

== Schedule ==
Date	Time	Opponent	Site	TV	Result	Attendance	Source
September 4	5:00 pm	Florida A&M*	Memorial Stadium; Champaign, IL	ESPN Plus	W 52–13	46,106	
September 11	11:00 am	UCLA*	Memorial Stadium; Champaign, IL	ABC	L 17–35	47,457	
September 18	1:00 pm	Western Michigan*	Memorial Stadium; Champaign, IL		W 30–27	51,452	
September 25	11:00 am	No. 15 Purdue	Memorial Stadium; Champaign, IL (rivalry)	ESPN Plus	L 30–38	50,532	
October 2	1:00 pm	at No. 20 Wisconsin	Camp Randall Stadium; Madison, WI		L 7–24	82,306	
October 9	11:00 am	at Michigan State	Spartan Stadium; East Lansing, MI	ESPN Plus	L 25–38	72,441	
October 16	11:00 am	No. 14 Michigan	Memorial Stadium; Champaign, IL (rivalry)	ABC	L 19–30	55,725	
October 23	1:00 pm	at Minnesota	Hubert H. Humphrey Metrodome; Minneapolis, MN		L 0–45	46,526	
October 30	11:00 am	No. 23 Iowa^{†}	Memorial Stadium; Champaign, IL	ESPN Plus	L 13–23	47,651	
November 6	1:00 pm	Indiana	Memorial Stadium; Champaign, IL (rivalry)		W 26–22	41,458	
November 20	11:00 am	at Northwestern	Ryan Field; Evanston, IL (rivalry)	ESPN Plus	L 21–28 ^{OT}	23,563	
*Non-conference game; ^{†}Homecoming; Rankings from AP Poll released prior to the game; All times are in Central time

== Roster ==
2004 Illinois Fighting Illini football team roster
Players
Coaches
Offense

Pos.	#	Name	Class
QB	7	Jon Beutjer	Sr
RB	33	Brock Bolen	Fr
FB	34	Jason Davis	Jr
WR	84	Kendrick Jones	Jr
RB	23	Marcus Mason	So
C	60	Ryan McDonald	Fr
RB	3	Walter Mendenhall	Fr
QB	16	Chris Pazan	So
C	75	Duke Preston	Sr
RB	30	Pierre Thomas	So

Defense

Pos.	#	Name	Class
CB	18	Alan Ball	So
DL	96	Chris Norwell	So
DL	98	Xavier Fulton	Fr
CB	6	Kelvin Hayden	Sr
LB	47	Jeremy Leman	Fr
S	42	Kevin Mitchell	Fr
DE	66	Brian Schaefering	Jr
LB	44	Matt Sinclair	Sr
DE	91	Derek Walker	Fr
LB	48	Remond Willis	Fr

Special teams

Pos.	#	Name	Class
K	13	Jason Reda	Fr
P	37	Steve Weatherford	Jr

Head coach

- Ron Turner

Coordinators/assistant coaches

Legend

- (C) Team captain
- (S) Suspended
- (I) Ineligible
- Injured
- Redshirt

== Game summaries ==
=== Florida A&M ===
	1	2	3	4	Total
Rattlers	0	0	0	13	13
Fighting Illini	7	24	21	0	52

Statistics	FAMU	ILL
First downs	21	26
Total yards	358	554
Rushing yards	71	296
Passing yards	287	258
Turnovers	3	0
Time of possession	29:26	30:34

Team	Category	Player	Statistics
Florida A&M	Passing	Ben Dougherty	22/34, 144 yards, 2 INT
Florida A&M	Rushing	Josh Driscoll	8 rushes, 40 yards, 2 TD
Florida A&M	Receiving	Derek Williams	3 receptions, 59 yards
Illinois	Passing	Jon Beutjer	16/18, 228 yards, TD
Illinois	Rushing	Pierre Thomas	14 rushes, 143 yards, 2 TD
Illinois	Receiving	Kendrick Jones	3 receptions, 101 yards
