= 2004 Michigan State Spartans football team =

American college football season

2004 Michigan State Spartans football
- Conference: Big Ten Conference
- Record: 5–7 (4–4 Big Ten)
- Head coach: John L. Smith (2nd season)
- Offensive coordinator: Dave Baldwin (2nd season)
- Offensive scheme: Spread
- Defensive coordinator: Chris Smeland (2nd season)
- Base defense: 4–3
- Home stadium: Spartan Stadium (c. 72,027 natural grass)

2004 Big Ten Conference football standings
| | Conf. | | | Overall |
| Team | W | | L | W | | L |
|---|---|---|---|---|---|---|
| No. 14 Michigan $+ | 7 | – | 1 | 9 | – | 3 |
| No. 8 Iowa + | 7 | – | 1 | 10 | – | 2 |
| No. 17 Wisconsin | 6 | – | 2 | 9 | – | 3 |
| Northwestern | 5 | – | 3 | 6 | – | 6 |
| No. 20 Ohio State | 4 | – | 4 | 8 | – | 4 |
| Purdue | 4 | – | 4 | 7 | – | 5 |
| Michigan State | 4 | – | 4 | 5 | – | 7 |
| Minnesota | 3 | – | 5 | 7 | – | 5 |
| Penn State | 2 | – | 6 | 4 | – | 7 |
| Illinois | 1 | – | 7 | 3 | – | 8 |
| Indiana | 1 | – | 7 | 3 | – | 8 |
$ – BCS representative as conference champion; + – Conference co-champions; Rankings from AP Poll

The 2004 Michigan State Spartans football team represented Michigan State University in the 2004 NCAA Division I-A football season. Michigan State competed as a member of the Big Ten Conference, and played their home games at Spartan Stadium in East Lansing, Michigan. The Spartans were led by second-year head coach John L. Smith.

== Schedule ==
| Date | Time | Opponent | Site | TV | Result | Attendance | Source |
|---|---|---|---|---|---|---|---|
| September 4 | 3:30 p.m. | at Rutgers* | Rutgers Stadium; Piscataway, NJ | ABC | L 14–19 | 42,612 | |
| September 11 | 12:00 p.m. | Central Michigan* | Spartan Stadium; East Lansing, MI | ESPN Plus | W 24–7 | 72,908 | |
| September 18 | 7:00 p.m. | Notre Dame* | Spartan Stadium; East Lansing, MI (rivalry) | ESPN | L 24–31 | 74,962 | |
| September 25 | 12:00 p.m. | at Indiana | Memorial Stadium; Bloomington, IN (rivalry) | ESPN Plus | W 30–20 | 24,471 | |
| October 2 | 12:00 p.m. | at Iowa | Kinnick Stadium; Iowa City, IA | ESPN Plus | L 16–38 | 70,397 | |
| October 9 | 12:00 p.m. | Illinois | Spartan Stadium; East Lansing, MI | ESPN Plus | W 38–25 | 72,441 | |
| October 16 | 12:00 p.m. | No. 19 Minnesota^{†} | Spartan Stadium; East Lansing, MI | ESPN | W 51–17 | 72,383 | |
| October 30 | 3:30 p.m. | at No. 14 Michigan | Michigan Stadium; Ann Arbor, MI (rivalry) | ABC | L 37–45 ^{3OT} | 111,609 | |
| November 6 | 12:00 p.m. | Ohio State | Spartan Stadium; East Lansing, MI | ESPN | L 19–32 | 72,222 | |
| November 13 | 3:30 p.m. | No. 5 Wisconsin | Spartan Stadium; East Lansing, MI | ABC | W 49–14 | 76,697 | |
| November 20 | 12:00 p.m. | at Penn State | Beaver Stadium; University Park, PA (Land Grant Trophy) | ESPN2 | L 13–37 | 101,486 | |
| December 4 | 11:05 p.m. | at Hawaii* | Aloha Stadium; Hālawa, HI | ESPN2 | L 38–41 | 41,654 | |
*Non-conference game; ^{†}Homecoming; Rankings from Coaches' Poll released prior to the game; All times are in Eastern time

== Roster ==
2004 Michigan State Spartans football team roster
Players
Coaches
Offense

| Pos. | # | Name | Class |
|---|---|---|---|
| WR | 19 | Irving Campbell | Fr |
| RB | 30 | Jehuu Caulcrick | Fr |
| OT | 75 | Pete Clifford | Fr |
| RB | 21 | DeAndra' Cobb | Sr |
| G | 74 | Kyle Cook | So |
| TE | 80 | Kellen Davis | Fr |
| QB | 17 | Brian Hoyer | Fr |
| C | 51 | Chris Morris | Jr |
| QB | 9 | Stephen Reaves | Fr |
| QB | 5 | Drew Stanton | So |
| WR | 6 | Matt Trannon | Jr |
| QB | 18 | John Van Dam | Fr |
| G | 76 | Will Whitticker | Sr |

Defense

| Pos. | # | Name | Class |
|---|---|---|---|
| DE | 59 | Clifford Dukes | Sr |
| DT | 99 | Brandon McKinney | Jr |
| LB | 48 | Seth Mitchell | Sr |
| NT | 96 | Domata Peko | Jr |
| DE | 92 | Clifton Ryan | So |
| FS | 36 | Eric Smith | Jr |
| LB | 44 | Ronald Stanley | Sr |
| DT | 91 | Kevin Vickerson | Sr |

Special teams

| Pos. | # | Name | Class |
|---|---|---|---|
| P | 8 | Brandon Fields | So |
| K | 16 | Dave Rayner | Sr |

Head coach

- John L. Smith

Coordinators/assistant coaches

Legend

- (C) Team captain
- (S) Suspended
- (I) Ineligible
- Injured
- Redshirt

Roster

== Game summaries ==
=== Indiana ===
| Team | 1 | 2 | 3 | 4 | Total |
|---|---|---|---|---|---|
| • Michigan State | 0 | 7 | 10 | 13 | 30 |
| Indiana | 3 | 17 | 0 | 0 | 20 |

- Date: September 25
- Location: Memorial Stadium, Bloomington, Indiana
- Game start: 12:00 p.m. EST
- TV announcers (ESPN+): Craig Coshun (Play-by-play) & Charles Arbuckle (Color)

Scoring summary
| 1 | 4:42 | IND | Bryan Robertson 23-yard field goal | Indiana 3–0 |
| 2 | 14:17 | MSU | Drew Stanton 2-yard run (Dave Rayner kick) | Michigan St 7–3 |
| 2 | 10:18 | IND | Chris Rudanovic 12-yard pass from Matt LoVecchio (Bryan Robertson kick) | Indiana 10–7 |
| 2 | 4:25 | IND | Lance Bennett 94-yard punt return (Bryan Robertson kick) | Indiana 17–7 |
| 2 | 2:43 | IND | Bryan Robertson 31-yard field goal | Indiana 20–7 |
| 3 | 6:24 | MSU | Drew Stanton 1-yard run (Dave Rayner kick) | Indiana 20–14 |
| 3 | 2:58 | MSU | Dave Rayner 44-yard field goal | Indiana 20–17 |
| 4 | 9:45 | MSU | Jason Teague 1-yard run (Dave Rayner kick) | Michigan St 24–20 |
| 4 | 5:56 | MSU | Dave Rayner 22-yard field goal | Michigan St 27–20 |
| 4 | 2:36 | MSU | Dave Rayner 39-yard field goal | Michigan St 30-20 |

== Coaching staff ==
- John L. Smith – Head Coach
- Jim McElwain – Assistant Head Coach/Wide receivers coach/Special Teams coordinator
- Dave Baldwin – Offensive Coordinator/Tight end coach
- Doug Nussmeier – Quarterbacks coach
- Reggie Mitchell – Running backs coach/Recruiting coordinator
- Jeff Stoutland – Offensive line coach
- Chris Smeland – Defensive Coordinator
- Steve Stripling – Defensive line coach
- Mike Cox – Linebackers coach
- Paul Haynes – Defensive backs coach

== 2005 NFL draft ==
The following players were selected in the 2005 NFL draft.

| Player | Round | Pick | Position | NFL team |
|---|---|---|---|---|
| DeAndra' Cobb | 6 | 201 | Running back | Atlanta Falcons |
| Dave Rayner | 6 | 202 | Kicker | Indianapolis Colts |
| Kevin Vickerson | 7 | 216 | Defensive tackle | Miami Dolphins |
| Will Whitticker | 7 | 246 | Guard | Green Bay Packers |
