= 2004 Purdue Boilermakers football team =

American college football season

2004 Purdue Boilermakers football

Sun Bowl, L 23–27 vs. Arizona State
- Conference: Big Ten Conference
- Record: 7–5 (4–4 Big Ten)
- Head coach: Joe Tiller (8th season)
- Offensive coordinator: Jim Chaney (8th season)
- Offensive scheme: Spread
- Defensive coordinator: Brock Spack (8th season)
- Base defense: 4–3
- Captains: Jon Goldsberry; Taylor Stubblefield; Antwaun Rogers; Kyle Orton
- Home stadium: Ross–Ade Stadium

2004 Big Ten Conference football standings
	Conf.			Overall
Team	W		L	W		L
No. 14 Michigan $+	7	–	1	9	–	3
No. 8 Iowa +	7	–	1	10	–	2
No. 17 Wisconsin	6	–	2	9	–	3
Northwestern	5	–	3	6	–	6
No. 20 Ohio State	4	–	4	8	–	4
Purdue	4	–	4	7	–	5
Michigan State	4	–	4	5	–	7
Minnesota	3	–	5	7	–	5
Penn State	2	–	6	4	–	7
Illinois	1	–	7	3	–	8
Indiana	1	–	7	3	–	8
$ – BCS representative as conference champion; + – Conference co-champions; Rankings from AP Poll

The 2004 Purdue Boilermakers football team represented Purdue University during the 2004 NCAA Division I-A football season. The team was coached by Joe Tiller and played its home games at Ross–Ade Stadium. Purdue played twelve games in the 2004 season, finishing with a 7–5 record and a loss in the Sun Bowl to Arizona State. The season was Kyle Orton's senior year at Purdue.

== Schedule ==
Date	Time	Opponent	Rank	Site	TV	Result	Attendance
September 5	1:30 pm	Syracuse*	No. 24	Ross–Ade Stadium; West Lafayette, IN	ABC	W 51–0	56,827
September 11	1:00 pm	Ball State*	No. 25	Ross–Ade Stadium; West Lafayette, IN		W 59–7	64,323
September 25	12:00 pm	at Illinois	No. 15	Memorial Stadium; Champaign, IL (rivalry)	ESPN Plus	W 38–30	50,532
October 2	2:30 pm	at Notre Dame*	No. 15	Notre Dame Stadium; Notre Dame, IN (rivalry)	NBC	W 41–16	80,795
October 9	4:30 pm	at Penn State	No. 9	Beaver Stadium; University Park, PA	ESPN	W 20–13	108,183
October 16	5:30 pm	No. 10 Wisconsin	No. 5	Ross–Ade Stadium; West Lafayette, IN (College GameDay)	ESPN2	L 17–20	65,196
October 23	3:30 pm	No. 13 Michigan	No. 12	Ross–Ade Stadium; West Lafayette, IN	ABC	L 14–16	65,170
October 30	12:00 pm	at Northwestern	No. 17	Ryan Field; Evanston, IL	ESPN	L 10–13	30,312
November 6	3:30 pm	at No. 20 Iowa		Kinnick Stadium; Iowa City, IA	ESPN	L 21–23	70,397
November 13	3:30 pm	Ohio State		Ross–Ade Stadium; West Lafayette, IN	ESPN	W 24–17	64,639
November 20	12:00 pm	Indiana		Ross–Ade Stadium; West Lafayette, IN (Old Oaken Bucket)	ESPN Plus	W 63–24	65,137
December 31	2:00 pm	vs. No. 21 Arizona State*		Sun Bowl; El Paso, TX (Sun Bowl)	CBS	L 23–27	51,288
*Non-conference game; Rankings from AP Poll released prior to the game; All times are in Eastern time

== Game summaries ==
=== Syracuse ===
Syracuse at #25 Purdue

Team	1	2	3	4	Total
Orange	0	0	0	0	0
• No. 25 Boilermakers	14	6	17	14	51

- Date: Sunday, September 5
- Location: Ross–Ade Stadium, West Lafayette, IN
- Game start: 1:30 p.m. EST
- Game attendance: 56,827
- Source: ESPN

Scoring summary
1	4:01	PUR	Jerod Void 1-yard run (Ben Jones kick)	PUR 7-0
1	1:10	PUR	Brian Hare 75-yard pass from Kyle Orton (Ben Jones kick)	PUR 14-0
2	6:15	PUR	Taylor Stubblefield 23-yard pass from Kyle Orton (kick blocked)	PUR 20-0
3	6:09	PUR	Taylor Stubblefield 67-yard pass from Kyle Orton (Ben Jones kick)	PUR 27-0
3	2:04	PUR	Brandon Jones 32-yard pass from Kyle Orton (Ben Jones kick)	PUR 34-0
3	0:32	PUR	Ben Jones 34-yard field goal	PUR 37-0
4	9:39	PUR	Jerome Brooks 44-yard run (Ben Jones kick)	PUR 44-0
4	2:11	PUR	Dustin Keller 47-yard pass from Brandon Kirsch (Ben Jones kick)	PUR 51-0

Optimism abounded toward the Purdue football program coached by Joe Tiller after a terrific '03 season. Although the Boilermakers had 8 defensive starters to replace in 2004 (6 of whom were NFL draft picks), they returned most of their productive offense - including solid Seniors in QB Kyle Orton and catch-machine WR Taylor Stubblefield.

In the first Sunday game played at Ross Ade Stadium, Purdue hosted the Syracuse Orange of the Big East. Despite the hot conditions, the Boilermakers controlled the game on both sides of the ball, defeating Syracuse 51–0.

Orton and the Purdue offense shook off a slow start (and a missed Ben Jones FG) to compile 571 yards of turnover-free offense, highlighted by 4 long Orton TD passes in a 16–30; 287 yard performance. Even reserve QB Brandon Kirsch - playing for the first time since 2002 - got in on the rout by engineering 2 4th-quarter TD drives including a 47-yard TD pass to freshman TE Dustin Keller.

On the flipside, the new-look Purdue defense was terrific in holding first-time starting QB Joe Fields and the Syracuse offense to 197 total yards, 3 turnovers, and most impressively - 0 points. Fields also got no help from his running game, as acclaimed RBs Walter Reyes and Damien Rhodes combined for only 36 yards on 17 carries.

=== Ball State ===
	1	2	3	4	Total
Cardinals	0	0	0	7	7
Boilermakers	21	24	7	7	59

Purdue continued its outstanding start to 2004, improving to 2–0 by blasting the MAC's Ball State Cardinals 59–7. The Boilermakers did the majority of the damage in an incredible first half that sent them to the locker room with a 45–0 advantage.

Kyle Orton performed phenomenally – 23–26; 329 yards and 5 TDs – in guiding the Purdue offense to 599 yards, 34 first downs and no turnovers. WR Taylor Stubblefield had 3 TD catches. And the Purdue defense had another superb game, holding the Cardinals' offense to 197 total yards and nearly pitching another shutout until Ball State got on the board midway through the 4th quarter.

=== Illinois ===
	1	2	3	4	Total
Boilermakers	10	14	7	7	38
Fighting Illini	10	10	3	7	30

The Boilermakers began Big Ten play by improving to 3–0 with a hard-earned road win over the Fighting Illini, 38–30.

Purdue took a lead it wouldn't relinquish early in the 2nd quarter on a short TD run by Orton, 17–10. Late in the first half with the score 17–13, Orton noticed an oncoming 3rd down Illini blitz and audibled to flip a soft pass over the charging defense to RB Brandon Jones, who had snuck past the blitz. Jones then ran untouched for a 49-yard TD and an 11-point advantage.

Illinois would get no closer than 4 points down the rest of the game, as the Illini defense couldn't give their offense a chance to tie until less than a minute remained in the game. On the second play of Illinois' last-chance drive, DE Anthony Spencer forced a fumble on a sack of Illini QB Jon Beutjer that Purdue recovered to essentially end the game.

The Purdue offense – especially QB Kyle Orton – continued to excel by rolling up 515 total yards without committing a turnover. Orton threw for 366 yards and 4 TDs (plus the rushing TD). Two of his TD passes came on 3rd down audibles – one of them to his top receiving target WR Taylor Stubblefield, who caught 11 passes for 115 yards and three touchdowns which increased his early season total to 8 TD catches.

While Purdue played near-perfect on offense, the young defense encountered its first struggles of the season with an Illinois offense that was able to effectively move via the run and pass for 390 yards. In defeat, Illini RBs E. B. Halsey, Pierre Thomas and Jason Davis combined for 208 yards rushing.

It was at this point that Orton began to be mentioned as a top Heisman Trophy candidate.

=== Notre Dame ===
#15 Purdue at Notre Dame

Team	1	2	3	4	Total
• No. 15 Boilermakers	10	10	21	0	41
Fighting Irish	3	0	13	0	16

- Date: Saturday, October 2
- Location: Notre Dame Stadium, South Bend, Indiana
- Game start: 2:30 p.m. EST
- Game attendance: 80,795
- Television network: NBC
- Source: ESPN

Scoring summary
1	10:49	PUR	Ben Jones 31-yard field goal	PUR 3-0
1	6:30	ND	D.J. Fitzpatrick 26-yard field goal	Tied 3-3
1	6:16	PUR	Jerome Brooks 100-yard kickoff return (Ben Jones kick)	PUR 10-3
2	11:24	PUR	Ben Jones 39-yard field goal	PUR 13-3
2	1:03	PUR	Rob Ninkovich 2-yard pass from Kyle Orton (Ben Jones kick)	PUR 20-3
3	11:51	PUR	Taylor Stubblefield 97-yard pass from Kyle Orton (Ben Jones kick)	PUR 27-3
3	8:54	ND	Rhema McKnight 40-yard pass from Brady Quinn (D.J. Fitzpatrick kick)	PUR 27-10
3	6:40	PUR	Kyle Ingraham 9-yard pass from Kyle Orton (Ben Jones kick)	PUR 34-10
3	4:17	ND	Rashaun Powers-Neal 1-yard run (pass failed)	PUR 34-16
3	0:45	PUR	Taylor Stubblefield 12-yard pass from Kyle Orton (Ben Jones kick)	PUR 41-16

With another outstanding performance from QB Kyle Orton, the Boilermakers improved to 4–0 with a surprisingly decisive 41–16 victory over 3–1 Notre Dame. This was the program's first win in South Bend since 1974 (in 13 tries).

After both teams' first drives ended in field goals, the game began to turn when Purdue kick returner Jerome Brooks returned an Irish kickoff 100 yards for a TD and a 10–3 lead. Later in the 2nd quarter with Purdue holding a 13–3 lead and the Irish threatening to score, Purdue took control when DE Anthony Spencer forced a fumble from freshman RB Darius Walker that Purdue recovered. Orton then led the Purdue offense 97 yards on a drive that culminated in a short TD toss to DE-turned-TE Rob Ninkovich, for a 20–3 halftime lead.

Early in the 3rd quarter, after a Notre Dame punt pinned Purdue at their 3-yard line, WR Taylor Stubblefield beat tight man coverage to catch a 97-yard TD pass for a backbreaking score and 27–3 lead. The teams exchanged touchdowns for the rest of the 3rd quarter before a scoreless 4th quarter.

If not points, the Irish certainly rolled up yards (536) on the Purdue defense, as Quinn threw for a then-career-high 432 yards. But some timely stops (including 7 sacks) by the Purdue defense, the untimely Walker fumble, and the defense's inability to stop Orton and the Purdue offense proved too much to overcome.

Meanwhile, Orton completed 21 of 31 passes for 385 yards and 4 touchdowns; two of his TD throws were to Stubblefield in a 7 catch, 181 yard performance.

It was at this point in the season that Kyle Orton was considered a Heisman Trophy front-runner, as he had 17 TD passes and no interceptions. In fact, the Purdue offense still had yet to commit their first turnover of the season!

=== Penn State ===
	1	2	3	4	Total
Boilermakers	3	7	7	3	20
Nittany Lions	0	10	3	0	13

Purdue improved to 5–0 for the first time since 1945 by overcoming a fired-up Penn State team in a 20–13 win, their first ever in Happy Valley in what was the very first "Penn State Whiteout".

Purdue gained an early 10–0 advantage with a 50-yard FG by Ben Jones followed by a short Brandon Jones TD run. The key play of the TD drive was a 55-yard completion to TE Charles Davis.

But Senior QB Zack Mills, who had a fine day, led PSU back to tie the game at the half. First, they answered Purdue's TD drive with a TD of their own – a 37-yard TD pass to a diving WR Terrell Golden. Then, the Nittany Lions capped their next drive with a FG by K Robbie Gould.

Purdue took a 17–10 lead on their first drive of the 2nd half with a 40-yard TD pass from Kyle Orton to Taylor Stubblefield. The Nittany Lions later drove deep into Purdue territory but had to settle for a short FG and still trailed 17–13 after 3 quarters.

On the first play of the 4th quarter, Orton (and Purdue) committed their first turnover of the season with a Calvin Lowry interception. But PSU came up empty when Zack Mills was tackled short of the first down on a fake FG attempt. After a second Orton interception resulted in a missed PSU field goal, Purdue embarked on a gritty, time-consuming drive that ended with a long Ben Jones FG to regain a 7-point lead with less than 3 minutes left. The drive was kept alive with a terrific individual effort by freshman WR Dorien Bryant on a 3rd and long play.

Rodney Kinlaw gave the Lions a great opportunity to tie on the ensuing kickoff with a 64-yard return, but Mills and the PSU offense came up empty with 4 incomplete passes. Finally, on the last play, QB Anthony Morelli's desperation pass also fell incomplete.

In what became the 2004 theme for PSU, their defense endured against the high-powered Purdue offense by limiting it to 348 yards and sacking Orton 3 times. The young Purdue defense held up well against the run by limiting PSU to 18 yards on 17 carries, and put a good pass-rush on Mills by sacking him 3 times.

In addition to catching his 11th TD pass of the season, Taylor Stubblefield set the Big Ten record for catches, surpassing former teammate John Standeford.

=== Wisconsin ===
	1	2	3	4	Total
Badgers	0	7	0	13	20
Boilermakers	0	0	7	10	17

In a wild game between two ranked opponents in West Lafayette, the Badgers handed #5 Purdue its first loss of the season. In the 4th Quarter Boilermaker QB Kyle Orton fumbled the ball and Badger DB Scott Starks returned the fumble for the go-ahead score. Within Purdue football fandom, this play is sometimes referred to as "The Fumble". With the crushing loss, Purdue fell to 5–1 on the season.

=== Michigan ===
	1	2	3	4	Total
Wolverines	7	3	3	3	16
Boilermakers	7	0	7	0	14

The 2-point loss to Michigan at home was the 2nd in a row for the Boilermakers.

=== Northwestern ===
	1	2	3	4	Total
Boilermakers	10	0	0	0	10
Wildcats	7	0	0	6	13

Purdue fell to 5–3 on the season with a 3rd consecutive loss.

=== Iowa ===
	1	2	3	4	Total
Boilermakers	0	7	7	7	21
Hawkeyes	17	0	0	6	23

With the loss, their fourth in a row, the Boilermakers fell to 5–4 on the season.

=== Ohio State ===
	1	2	3	4	Total
Buckeyes	3	0	7	7	17
Boilermakers	3	14	0	7	24

Purdue snapped their losing streak to the Buckeyes and their overall 4-game losing streak with a 24–17 win in West Lafayette, improving to 6–4 on the year. The Purdue win made it impossible for the Buckeyes to finish with a winning conference record in 2004.

=== Indiana ===
Team	1	2	3	4	Total
Indiana	3	7	7	7	24
• Purdue	21	21	7	14	63

- Date: November 20
- Location: Ross–Ade Stadium, West Lafayette, IN
- Game start: 12:00 p.m. EST

Scoring summary
Q1	PUR	Ingraham 52 yard pass from Orton (Jones kick)	PUR 7–0
Q1	IND	Robertson 31 yard field goal	PUR 7–3
Q1	PUR	Stubblefield 23 yard pass from Orton (Jones kick)	PUR 14–3
Q1	PUR	Jones 4 yard run (Jones kick)	PUR 21–3
Q2	IND	Lumpkin 74 yard fumble return (Robertson kick)	PUR 21–10
Q2	PUR	Bryant 21 yard pass from Orton (Jones kick)	PUR 28–10
Q2	PUR	Stubblefield 17 yard pass from Orton (Jones kick)	PUR 35–10
Q2	PUR	Ingraham 26 yard pass from Orton (Jones kick)	PUR 42–10
Q3	PUR	Stubblefield 12 yard pass from Orton (Jones kick)	PUR 49–10
Q3	IND	Taylor 22 yard run (Robertson kick)	PUR 49–17
Q4	PUR	Bryant 62 yard run (Jones kick)	PUR 56–17
Q4	PUR	Davis 61 yard pass from Kirsch (Jones kick)	PUR 63–17
Q4	IND	Roby 19 yard pass from LoVecchio (Robertson kick)	PUR 63–24

With the win (in the highest scoring game in series history), the Boilermakers finished 4–4 in Big Ten conference play. Purdue extended their home winning streak over the Hoosiers to 4 games (their last loss to the Hoosiers in Ross–Ade Stadium coming in the 1996 season). Joe Tiller and the Boilermakers finished the regular season with a 7–4 record.

=== Arizona State ===
	1	2	3	4	Total
Sun Devils	3	0	7	17	27
Boilermakers	0	2	7	14	23

== Roster ==
2004 Purdue Boilermakers football team roster
Players
Coaches
Offense

Pos.	#	Name	Class
WR	2	Ray Williams	Jr
TE	3	Garret Bushong	So
QB	3	Jason Renn	Fr
WR	4	Fabian Martin	Fr
WR	6	Desmond Tardy	Fr
WR	9	Dorien Bryant	Fr
QB	11	Brandon Kirsch	Jr
QB	14	Scott Carroll	Fr
WR	15	Bruce Gordon	Jr
QB	16	David Ramirez	Fr
QB	17	Curtis Painter	Fr
QB	18	Kyle Orton	Sr
WR	19	Brandon Whittington	Fr
WR	20	Andre Chattams	So
WR	21	Taylor Stubblefield (C)	Sr
RB	22	Jerome Brooks	So
WR	23	Kevin Noel	Sr
WR	25	Jake Standeford	Fr
RB	26	Chris Haslon	Fr
RB	27	Brandon Jones	Jr
TE	28	Dustin Keller	Fr
TE	46	Matthew Kern	Fr
RB	40	Kory Sheets	Fr
RB	42	Anthony Heygood	Fr
TE	43	Jeff Bennett	Jr
G	50	Tyler Moore	Sr
OT	51	Garret Miller	Fr
G	53	Nick Fincher	Fr
G, C	56	Matt Turner	Jr
OT	60	Zach Smith	Fr
OT	63	David Owen	Sr
G	64	Danny May	Sr
OT	65	Mike Otto	So
G	66	Jordan Grimes	Fr
G	67	Uche Nwaneri	So
C	68	Robbie Powell	Fr
OT	70	Pat Oxley	Fr
OT	74	Sean Sester	Fr
OT	75	Brian Wang	Jr
G	76	Willie Bach	Sr
OT	77	Ryan Noblet	Fr
WR	80	Brandon Hare	Jr
WR	83	Jake Cunningham	Fr
WR	84	Byron Williams	Fr
WR	86	Chase Lecklider	So
TE	87	Charles Davis	Jr
WR	89	Kyle Ingraham	So
TE	90	Ryan Baker	Fr
TE	96	Nick Raben	So

Defense

Pos.	#	Name	Class
CB	5	Zach Logan	Fr
SS	7	Kyle Smith	Jr
FS	8	Grant Walker	Fr
DE	10	Ray Edwards	So
CB	12	Antwaun Rogers (C)	Sr
S	13	Torri Williams	Fr
LB	17	Josh Ferguson	Fr
SS	19	Christian Graham	Fr
LB	22	Delos Bhatti	Fr
CB	24	Sean Petty	Jr
FS	25	Paul Long	So
FS	26	Lance Melvin	Fr
LB	30	George Hall	So
SS	31	Bernard Pollard	So
CB	33	Brian Hickman	Jr
LB	34	Jimmy Ladd	Fr
LB	36	Dan Bick	Fr
FS	37	Rafael Price	Fr
SS	38	Brian Mattaway	So
LB	39	Bobby Iwuchukwu	Jr
LB	41	John Lampert	So
LB	44	Jon Goldsberry (C)	Sr
DE	45	Eugene Bright	Fr
LB	46	Luis Vasquez	Fr
CB	47	Paul Dubler	Jr
SS	48	Pat Kohtz	So
DE	49	Anthony Spencer	So
LB	52	Mike Durrett	Fr
DE	54	Adam Huebner	So
DT	55	Brandon Villarreal	Jr
DE	57	Jeremy Coley	Jr
DT	58	Brent Grover	Jr
LB	59	Stanford Keglar	Fr
DT	69	Neal Tull	Fr
LB	81	Al Royal	So
LB	85	Cliff Avril	Fr
LB	88	Drew Rucks	So
DE	91	Nick Cavallo	So
DT	92	Josh O'Brien	Fr
DE	93	Rob Ninkovich	Jr
DT	97	Jamaal Jones	Fr
DT	98	Dan McGowen	So
DT	99	Jonathan Patton	Fr

Special teams

Pos.	#	Name	Class
P, K	16	Dave Brytus	Fr
P, K	29	Aaron Levin	Sr
K	35	Ben Jones	Jr
K	36	Casey Welch	So
LS	72	Chris Mattson	Fr

Head coach

- Joe Tiller

Coordinators/assistant coaches

- Jim Chaney (offensive coordinator / tight ends)
- Brock Spack (defensive coordinator / linebackers)
- Gary Emanuel (assistant head coach / defensive ends)
- Lou Anarumo (defensive backs)
- Blaine Bennett (quarterbacks)
- Bob DeBesse (wide receivers / recruiting coordinator)
- Mark Hagen (defensive tackles / special teams)
- Bill Legg (offensive line)
- David Mitchell (running backs)
- Chris Clopton (offensive graduate assistant)
- Burt Thornton (defensive graduate assistant)
- Don Coller (Director of football operations)
- Jim Lathrop (strength and conditioning coordinator)

Legend

- (C) Team captain
- (S) Suspended
- (I) Ineligible
- Injured
- Redshirt

Roster
Last update: November 21, 2016

== 2005 NFL draft ==
Player	Position	Round	Pick	NFL club
Kyle Orton	Quarterback	4	106	Chicago Bears
