= 2005 Outback Bowl =

- 19th Outback Bowl
Georgia Bulldogs	Wisconsin Badgers
(9–2)	(9–2)
SEC	Big Ten
24	21
Head coach: Mark Richt	Head coach: Barry Alvarez
AP / Coaches / BCS; 8 / 7 / 7	AP / Coaches / BCS; 16 / 16 / 17
	1	2	3	4	Total
Georgia	3	7	14	0	24
Wisconsin	3	3	7	8	21
- Date: January 1, 2005
- Season: 2004
- Stadium: Raymond James Stadium
- Location: Tampa, Florida
- MVP: David Pollack (Georgia DE)
- Referee: Jack Childress (ACC)

United States TV coverage
- Network: ESPN
- Announcers: Mark Jones, Bob Davie, Holly Rowe

The 2005 Outback Bowl featured the Georgia Bulldogs, and the Wisconsin Badgers. Both teams came into the game ranked, and with only two losses. This was the 19th edition of the Outback Bowl.

== Summary ==
Brandon Coutu provided the first scoring of the game, as Georgia got on the board first with a 20-yard field goal. Later in the first quarter, kicker Mike Allen got Wisconsin on the board with a 46-yard field goal, to tie the game, 3–3. In the second quarter, Allen connected on a 44-yard field goal, to give Wisconsin a 6–3 lead. Quarterback David Greene connected with wide receiver Fred Gibson for a 19-yard touchdown pass, to give Georgia a 10–6 halftime lead.

In the third quarter, Greene found Jeremy Thomas for a 24-yard touchdown to extend the lead to 17–6. Running back Thomas Brown rushed 29 yards for a touchdown, to increase Georgia's lead to 24–6 at the end of the third quarter.

In the fourth quarter, Quarterback John Stocco found wide receiver Darrin Charles for a 19-yard touchdown pass to trim the lead to 24–13. With Georgia trying to run out the clock, David Greene threw an interception that was returned by Andy Crooks for 11 yards, for a Wisconsin touchdown. The ensuing two-point conversion attempt succeeded, and Wisconsin now trailed by only three points, 24–21. Their ensuing onside kick attempt failed, but there was still time left. Georgia eventually converted a fourth-and-one on Wisconsin's 15-yard line, which allowed the Bulldogs to run out the clock and secure the victory.
