= Erasmus James =

Kittitan-born American football player (born 1982)

No. 99, 78
- Position: Defensive end

Personal information
- Born: November 4, 1982 (age 44); Basseterre, Saint Kitts and Nevis
- Listed height: 6 ft 4 in (1.93 m)
- Listed weight: 263 lb (119 kg)

Career information
- High school: McArthur (Hollywood, Florida, U.S.)
- College: Wisconsin (2001–2004)
- NFL draft: 2005: 1st round, 18th overall pick

Career history
- Minnesota Vikings (2005–2007); Washington Redskins (2008); New Mexico Stars (2012)

Awards and highlights
- Bill Willis Trophy (2004); Consensus All-American (2004); Big Ten Defensive Player of the Year (2004); Big Ten Defensive Lineman of the Year (2004); First-team All-Big Ten (2004)

Career NFL statistics
- Total tackles: 38
- Sacks: 5
- Forced fumbles: 1
- Pass deflections: 2
- Stats at Pro Football Reference

Erasmus James (born November 4, 1982) is a Kittitan-born former professional American football defensive end who played in the National Football League (NFL). He played college football for the Wisconsin Badgers, and earned consensus All-American honors. He was selected by the Minnesota Vikings in the first round of the 2005 NFL draft. James is the second Badger defensive lineman (joining Wendell Bryant) in the past four seasons to be selected in the first round of the draft. He also played for the Washington Redskins, as well as for the New Mexico Stars of the Indoor Football League (IFL).

== Early life ==
James was born in Basseterre, Saint Kitts and Nevis. He attended McArthur High School in Hollywood, Florida, and was a standout for the McArthur Mustangs high school football and basketball teams. Despite not playing football until his senior year, he posted 14 quarterback sacks, and 53 tackles (23 for losses) in his only season.

== College career ==
James attended the University of Wisconsin in Madison, and played for the Wisconsin Badgers football team from 2001 to 2004. He played on the defensive line alongside teammate Anttaj Hawthorne and Jonathan Clinkscale. He finished his career with 124 tackles (25.5 for losses), 18 sacks, 28 quarterback hurries, seven forced fumbles, two fumble recoveries, and six pass deflections. James was nicknamed "the Eraser" for his ability to sack opposing quarterbacks. He was a first-team All-Big Ten selection and was recognized as a consensus first-team All-American following his senior season in 2004.

== Professional career ==
Pre-draft measurables
| Height | Weight | 40-yard dash | 10-yard split | 20-yard split | 20-yard shuttle | Three-cone drill | Vertical jump | Broad jump |
|---|---|---|---|---|---|---|---|---|
| 6 ft 4 1/8 in (1.93 m) | 266 lb (121 kg) | 4.81 s | 1.63 s | 2.77 s | 4.44 s | 7.56 s | 37 1/2 in (0.95 m) | 10 ft 2 in (3.10 m) |
All values from NFL Combine.

325-pound bench press. 600-pound squat.

=== Minnesota Vikings ===
James was selected by the Minnesota Vikings in the first round with the 18th overall pick in the 2005 NFL draft. During his rookie year, he compiled 28 total tackles and four sacks. James missed most of the 2006 and 2007 seasons with injuries. The Vikings made their intentions clear to waive James on May 23, 2008, but later rescinded the waiver after the Washington Redskins offered a conditional 2009 seventh-round draft choice. He finished his injury-plagued career with the Vikings with 37 tackles and 5 sacks.

=== Washington Redskins ===
On May 27, 2008, the Vikings agreed to trade James to the Washington Redskins for a conditional seventh-round pick in the 2009 NFL draft. He appeared in five games for the Redskins in 2008 but did not record any statistics and was eventually waived on December 9, 2008.

=== NFL statistics ===
| Year | Team | GP | COMB | TOTAL | AST | SACK | FF | FR | FR YDS | INT | IR YDS | AVG IR | LNG | TD | PD |
|---|---|---|---|---|---|---|---|---|---|---|---|---|---|---|---|
| 2005 | MIN | 15 | 28 | 23 | 5 | 4.0 | 1 | 0 | 0 | 0 | 0 | 0 | 0 | 0 | 2 |
| 2006 | MIN | 2 | 2 | 2 | 0 | 0.0 | 0 | 0 | 0 | 0 | 0 | 0 | 0 | 0 | 0 |
| 2007 | MIN | 6 | 7 | 5 | 2 | 1.0 | 0 | 0 | 0 | 0 | 0 | 0 | 0 | 0 | 0 |
| 2008 | WAS | 5 | 0 | 0 | 0 | 0.0 | 0 | 0 | 0 | 0 | 0 | 0 | 0 | 0 | 0 |
| Career | | 28 | 37 | 30 | 7 | 5.0 | 1 | 0 | 0 | 0 | 0 | 0 | 0 | 0 | 2 |

== Personal life ==
James currently resides in Albuquerque, New Mexico. In November 2009, James was arrested and charged with felony battery after a bar fight in Madison. He entered a program for first-time offenders but did not complete the requirements of the program.
