= 2004 Ohio State Buckeyes football team =

American college football season

2004 Ohio State Buckeyes football

Alamo Bowl champion

Alamo Bowl, W 33–7 vs. Oklahoma State
- Conference: Big Ten Conference

Ranking
- Coaches: No. 19
- AP: No. 20
- Record: 8–4 (4–4 Big Ten)
- Head coach: Jim Tressel (4th season)
- Offensive coordinator: Jim Bollman (4th season)
- Offensive scheme: Multiple
- Defensive coordinator: Mark Snyder (1st season)
- Co-defensive coordinator: Mel Tucker (1st season)
- Base defense: 4–3
- MVP: Mike Nugent
- Captains: Dustin Fox; Simon Fraser; Mike Nugent; Andrew Schulte
- Home stadium: Ohio Stadium

2004 Big Ten Conference football standings
	Conf.			Overall
Team	W		L	W		L
No. 14 Michigan $+	7	–	1	9	–	3
No. 8 Iowa +	7	–	1	10	–	2
No. 17 Wisconsin	6	–	2	9	–	3
Northwestern	5	–	3	6	–	6
No. 20 Ohio State	4	–	4	8	–	4
Purdue	4	–	4	7	–	5
Michigan State	4	–	4	5	–	7
Minnesota	3	–	5	7	–	5
Penn State	2	–	6	4	–	7
Illinois	1	–	7	3	–	8
Indiana	1	–	7	3	–	8
$ – BCS representative as conference champion; + – Conference co-champions; Rankings from AP Poll

The 2004 Ohio State Buckeyes football team was an American football team that represented the Ohio State University as a member of the Big Ten Conference during the 2004 NCAA Division I-A football season. In their fourth year under head coach Jim Tressel, the Buckeyes compiled an 8–4 record (4–4 in conference games), finished in a three-way tie for fifth place in the Big Ten, and outscored opponents by a total of 290 to 219. Against ranked opponents, the Buckeyes lost to No. 15 Wisconsin and defeated No. 7 Michigan. The Buckeyes also lost to unranked Northwestern, Iowa, and Purdue. They concluded the season with a 33–7 victory over unranked Oklahoma State in the 2004 Alamo Bowl. The Buckeyes were ranked No. 19 and 20 in the final Coaches and AP polls, respectiely.

The Buckeyes gained an average of 145.4 rushing yards and 175.4 passing yards per game. On defense, they gave up 130.4 rushing yards and 201.6 passing yards per game. Quarterback duties were split between Justin Zwick (1,209 passing yards, 52.4%) and Troy Smith (896 passing yards, 55.7% completion percentage). The team's other statistical leaders included running back Lydell Ross (476 rushing yards, 4.1 yards per carry), wide receiver Santonio Holmes (55 receptions for 769 yards), and kicker Mike Nugent (102 points scored, 30 of 30 extra points, 24 of 27 field goals). Nugent and linebacker A. J. Hawk were consensus first-team All-Americans. Nugent and Hawk also received first-team honors on the 2004 All-Big Ten Conference football team.

The team played its home games at Ohio Stadium in Columbus, Ohio.

== Schedule ==
Date	Time	Opponent	Rank	Site	TV	Result	Attendance
September 4	12:00 p.m.	Cincinnati*	No. 9	Ohio Stadium; Columbus, OH	ESPN Plus	W 27–6	104,604
September 11	3:30 p.m.	Marshall*	No. 9	Ohio Stadium; Columbus, OH	ABC	W 24–21	104,622
September 18	3:30 p.m.	at NC State*	No. 9	Carter–Finley Stadium; Raleigh, NC	ABC	W 22–14	56,800
October 2	9:00 p.m.	at Northwestern	No. 7	Ryan Field; Evanston, IL	ESPN2	L 27–33 ^{OT}	47,130
October 9	3:30 p.m.	No. 15 Wisconsin	No. 18	Ohio Stadium; Columbus, OH	ABC	L 13–24	105,090
October 16	3:30 p.m.	at Iowa	No. 25	Kinnick Stadium; Iowa City, IA	ABC	L 7–33	70,397
October 23	12:00 p.m.	Indiana		Ohio Stadium; Columbus, OH	ESPN Plus	W 30–7	104,538
October 30	12:00 p.m.	Penn State		Ohio Stadium; Columbus, OH (rivalry)	ABC	W 21–10	104,947
November 6	12:00 p.m.	at Michigan State		Spartan Stadium; East Lansing, MI	ESPN	W 32–19	72,222
November 13	3:30 p.m.	at Purdue		Ross–Ade Stadium; West Lafayette, IN	ESPN	L 17–24	64,639
November 20	1:00 p.m.	No. 7 Michigan		Ohio Stadium; Columbus, OH (rivalry)	ABC	W 37–21	105,456
December 29	8:00 p.m.	vs. Oklahoma State*	No. 24	Alamodome; San Antonio, TX (Alamo Bowl)	ESPN	W 33–7	65,265
*Non-conference game; Rankings from AP Poll released prior to the game; All times are in Eastern time

== Roster ==
2004 Ohio State Buckeyes football team roster
Players
Coaches
Offense

Pos.	#	Name	Class
OT	74	Kirk Barton	Fr
QB	17	Todd Boeckman	Fr
WR	3	Bam Childress	Sr
G	50	Doug Datish	So
WR	11	Anthony Gonzalez	Fr
WR	8	Roy Hall	So
WR	4	Santonio Holmes	Jr
FB	49	Dionte Johnson	Fr
C	55	Nick Mangold	Jr
RB	25	Antonio Pittman	Fr
OT	77	Rob Sims	Jr
QB	10	Troy Smith	So
RB	30	Lydell Ross	Sr
QB	12	Justin Zwick	So

Defense

Pos.	#	Name	Class
LB	42	Bobby Carpenter	Jr
SS	6	Tyler Everett	Jr
CB	37	Dustin Fox	Sr
DE	75	Simon Fraser	Sr
LB	17	Marcus Freeman	Fr
DE	50	Vernon Gholston	Fr
CB/WR	7	Ted Ginn Jr.	Fr
DT	94	Marcus Green	Jr
SS	34	Rob Harley	Sr
LB	47	A. J. Hawk	Jr
FS	32	Brandon Mitchell	So
DT	97	David Patterson	So
DT	90	Quinn Pitcock	So
DE	99	Jay Richardson	So
FS	21	Nate Salley	Jr
LB	51	Anthony Schlegel	Jr
FS	14	Antonio Smith	So
CB	19	Brandon Underwood	Fr
CB	2	E.J. Underwood	Jr
SS	9	Donte Whitner	So
CB	26	Ashton Youboty	So

Special teams

Pos.	#	Name	Class
K	23	Josh Huston	Sr
K	85	Mike Nugent	Sr
K	32	Ryan Pretorius	Fr
P	15	A.J. Trapasso	Fr

Head coach

- Jim Tressel

Coordinators/assistant coaches

Legend

- (C) Team captain
- (S) Suspended
- (I) Ineligible
- Injured
- Redshirt

Roster

== Coaching staff ==
- Jim Tressel – head oach (4th year)
- Jim Bollman – offensive line/offensive coordinator (4th year)
- Joe Daniels – quarterbacks / passing game coordinator (4th year)
- Ryan Smith- co-quarterbacks (1st year)
- Luke Fickell – defensive linebackers (4th year)
- Darrell Hazell – wide receivers (1st year)
- Jim Heacock – defensive line (9th year)
- Mark Snyder – defensive coordinator (4th year)
- Dick Tressel – running backs (4th year)
- Mel Tucker – co-defensive coordinator / defensive backs (4th year)
- Bob Tucker – director of football operations (10th year)
- Todd Goebbel - defensive quality control coach (1st year)

== Depth chart ==
Defense

FS
21 Nate Salley
32 Brandon Mitchell

WLB	MLB	SLB
47 A. J. Hawk	51 Anthony Schlegel	42 Bobby Carpenter
1 Thomas Matthews	5 Mike D'Andrea	17 Marcus Freeman

SS
6 Tyler Everett
9 Donte Whitner

CB
37 Dustin Fox
13 Harlen Jacobs

DE	DT	DT	DE
57 Mike Kudla	90 Quinn Pitcock	94 Marcus Green	75 Simon Fraser
84 Marcel Frost	98 Joel Penton	97 David Patterson	99 Jay Richardson

CB
26 Ashton Youboty
2 E.J. Underwood

Offense

SE
7 Ted Ginn Jr.
8 Roy Hall

LT	LG	C	RG	RT
77 Rob Sims	50 Doug Datish	55 Nick Mangold	64 Mike Knee	74 Kirk Barton
⋅	72 T.J. Downing	73 Steve Winner	66 R.J. Coleman	⋅

TE
80 Ryan Hamby
88 Rory Nicol

FL
4 Santonio Holmes
11 Anthony Gonzalez

QB
10 Troy Smith
12 Justin Zwick

Key reserves
25 Antonio Pittman (TB)
3 Bam Childress (WR)
30 Sirjo Welch (FS)

FB
38 Branden Joe
36 Brandon Schnittker

Special teams
PK 87 Mike Nugent
P 86 Kyle Turano

RB
30 Lydell Ross
28 Maurice Hall

== 2005 NFL draftees ==
Player	Round	Pick	Position	NFL club
Mike Nugent	2	47	Kicker	New York Jets
Dustin Fox	3	80	Defensive Back	Minnesota Vikings
Maurice Clarett	3	101	Running Back	Denver Broncos

== Game summaries ==
=== Cincinnati ===
Team	1	2	3	4	Total
Cincinnati	0	3	3	0	6
• Ohio State	0	10	7	10	27

- Date: September 4
- Location: Ohio Stadium, Columbus, OH
- Game start: 12:00 p.m. EST
- TV announcers (ESPN+): Mike Gleason (Play-by-play) & John Cooper (Color)

Scoring summary
2	14:54	CIN	Kevin Lovell 27-yard field goal	Cincinnati 3–0
2	10:15	OHST	Mike Nugent 27-yard field goal	Tie 3–3
2	1:11	OHST	Ryan Hamby 17-yard pass from Justin Zwick (Mike Nugent kick)	Ohio State 10–3
3	6:16	CIN	Kevin Lovell 25-yard field goal	Ohio State 10–6
3	2:27	OHST	Lydell Ross 1-yard run (Mike Nugent kick)	Ohio State 17–6
4	5:54	OHST	Santonio Holmes 23-yard pass from Troy Smith (Mike Nugent kick)	Ohio State 24–6
4	1:51	OHST	Mike Nugent 23-yard field goal	Ohio State 27–6

=== Marshall ===
Team	1	2	3	4	Total
Marshall	7	7	0	7	21
• Ohio State	14	7	0	3	24

- Date: September 11
- Location: Ohio Stadium, Columbus, Ohio
- Game start: 3:30 p.m. EST
- TV announcers (ABC): Mike Tirico (Play-by-play), Tim Brant (Color), Terry Bowden (Color) & Sam Ryan (Sideline)

Scoring summary
1	9:52	OHST	Santonio Holmes 80-yard pass from Justin Zwick (Mike Nugent kick)	Ohio State 7–0
1	5:31	MRSH	Earl Charles 2-yard run (Ian O'Connor kick)	Tie 7–7
1	:18	OHST	Santonio Holmes 47-yard pass from Justin Zwick (Mike Nugent kick)	Ohio State 14–7
2	5:36	MRSH	Jonathan Goddard 27-yard fumble return (Ian O'Connor kick)	Tie 14–14
2	3:13	OHST	Roy Hall 20-yard pass from Justin Zwick (Mike Nugent kick)	Ohio State 21–14
4	8:40	MRSH	Brad Bates 23-yard pass from Stan Hill (Ian O'Connor kick)	Tie 21–21
4	:00	OHST	Mike Nugent 55-yard field goal	Ohio State 24–21

=== Michigan ===
Michigan at Ohio State

Team	1	2	3	4	Total
Michigan	14	0	0	7	21
• Ohio State	7	13	14	3	37

- Date: November 20
- Location: Ohio Stadium, Columbus, OH
- Game start: 1:00 p.m. EST
- Game attendance: 105,456
- TV announcers (ABC): Brent Musburger (Play-by-play), Gary Danielson (Color) & Jack Arute (Sideline)

Scoring summary
1	13:47	OSU	Anthony Gonzalez 68-yard pass from Troy Smith (Mike Nugent kick)	OSU 7–0
1	10:25	MICH	Jason Avant 4-yard pass from Chad Henne (Garrett Rivas kick)	Tied 7–7
1	6:03	MICH	Mike Hart 1-yard run (Garrett Rivas kick)	MICH 14–7
2	13:16	OSU	Troy Smith 2-yard run (Mike Nugent kick)	Tied 14–14
2	2:16	OSU	Mike Nugent 21-yard field goal	OSU 17–14
2	0:00	OSU	Mike Nugent 42-yard field goal	OSU 20–14
3	9:56	OSU	Ted Ginn Jr. 82-yard punt return (Mike Nugent kick)	OSU 27–14
3	1:53	OSU	Santonio Holmes 12-yard pass from Troy Smith (Mike Nugent kick)	OSU 34–14
4	10:56	MICH	Braylon Edwards 38-yard pass from Chad Henne (Garrett Rivas kick)	OSU 34–21
4	7:15	OSU	Mike Nugent 48-yard field goal	OSU 37–21

=== Alamo Bowl ===
Ohio State vs. Oklahoma State

Team	1	2	3	4	Total
Oklahoma State	0	0	0	7	7
• Ohio State	13	10	7	3	33

- Date: December 29
- Location: Alamodome, San Antonio, TX
- Game start: 8:00 p.m. EST
- Game attendance: 65,265
- TV announcers (ESPN): Mike Tirico (Play-by-play), Lee Corso (Color), Kirk Herbstreit (Color) & Jill Arrington (Sideline)

Scoring summary
1	12:02	OHST	Anthony Gonzalez 23-yard pass from Justin Zwick (Mike Nugent kick)	OHST 7–0
1	9:53	OHST	Mike Nugent 37-yard field goal	OHST 10–0
1	5:55	OHST	Mike Nugent 35-yard field goal	OHST 13–0
2	10:26	OHST	Lydell Ross 1-yard run (Mike Nugent kick)	OHST 20–0
2	4:19	OHST	Mike Nugent 41-yard field goal	OHST 23–0
3	8:13	OHST	Ted Ginn Jr. 5-yard run (Mike Nugent kick)	OHST 30–0
4	10:44	OHST	Mike Nugent 36-yard field goal	OHST 33–0
4	7:29	OKST	Shawn Willis 4-yard run (Jason Ricks kick)	OHST 33–7

== Rankings ==
Ranking movements Legend: ██ Increase in ranking ██ Decrease in ranking — = Not ranked
	Week															
Poll	Pre	1	2	3	4	5	6	7	8	9	10	11	12	13	14	Final
AP	9	9	9	7	7	18	25	—	—	—	—	—	—	25	24	20
Coaches Poll	9	9	7	6	6	15	23	—	—	—	—	—	—	22	22	19
BCS	Not released							—	—	—	—	—	—	25	25	Not released
