= Matt Bernstein (American football) =

American football player (born 1982)

No. 44
- Position: Fullback

Personal information
- Born: December 26, 1982 (age 43); Scarsdale, New York, U.S.
- Listed height: 6 ft 1 in (1.85 m)
- Listed weight: 265 lb (120 kg)

Career information
- High school: Greenville (NY) Edgemont
- College: Wisconsin
- NFL draft: 2006: undrafted

Career history
- Detroit Lions (2006)*; Philadelphia Soul (2007)
- * Offseason or practice squad member only
- Stats at ArenaFan.com

Matt Bernstein (born December 26, 1982) is an American former professional football player who was a fullback in the National Football League (NFL). He played college football for the Wisconsin Badgers, and signed with the Detroit Lions of the National Football League (NFL) as an unsigned free agent. He was also a member of the Philadelphia Soul of the Arena Football League (AFL).

== Early life ==
Bernstein attended Edgemont Junior – Senior High School in New York, where he played as a fullback, linebacker, and tight end. He rushed for 1,885 yards and 25 scores as a junior. He then added 37 touchdowns and 2,002 yards on the ground and made 108 tackles with seven forced fumbles as a senior, earning the prep version of the Heisman Trophy for that performance. Bernstein finished his career ranked third all-time in New York prep annals in scoring with 504 points. He was a two-time Class C Player of the Year selection and a Con Edison Scholar-Athlete.

== College career ==
Bernstein played for the Wisconsin Badgers. As a redshirt freshman, he was named Academic All-Big Ten Conference selection and received the Elroy Hirsch Football Scholarship. He produced 53 touchdown-resulting blocks for a ground game that totaled 71 rushing touchdowns during his first three seasons at Wisconsin, and averaged 10 knockdown blocks per game and made 11 touchdown resulting blocks as a pass protector.

Bernstein played in every game in 2003 as a sophomore and emerged as the starting fullback. He started every game as a junior and finished third on the team with a career-high 300 rushing yards and a touchdown. He was named preseason All-American and All-Big Ten Conference first-team selection by The NFL Draft Report as a senior.

During his junior year, Bernstein, who is Jewish, fasted in observance of the religious holiday Yom Kippur prior to a game against the Penn State Nittany Lions. Bernstein recovered from the fast with a "pregame IV bag, and during the game, moved on to turkey slices, fruit and the Penn State defense", according to ESPN. In 2006, he was inducted into the National Jewish Sports Hall of Fame.

== Professional career ==
Bernstein was signed by the Detroit Lions of the National Football League (NFL) as an undrafted free agent, but was cut prior to the start of the 2006 season. The following year, he joined the Philadelphia Soul of the Arena Football League (AFL). However, he spent the entire 2007 season on injured reserve. In 2008, he attended a mini-camp with the New York Giants.

== See also ==
- List of select Jewish football players
