= 2004 Penn State Nittany Lions football team =

American college football season

2004 Penn State Nittany Lions football
- Conference: Big Ten Conference
- Record: 4–7 (2–6 Big Ten)
- Head coach: Joe Paterno (39th season)
- Offensive coordinator: Galen Hall (1st season)
- Offensive scheme: Pro-style
- Defensive coordinator: Tom Bradley (5th season)
- Base defense: 4–3
- Home stadium: Beaver Stadium

2004 Big Ten Conference football standings
	Conf.			Overall
Team	W		L	W		L
No. 14 Michigan $+	7	–	1	9	–	3
No. 8 Iowa +	7	–	1	10	–	2
No. 17 Wisconsin	6	–	2	9	–	3
Northwestern	5	–	3	6	–	6
No. 20 Ohio State	4	–	4	8	–	4
Purdue	4	–	4	7	–	5
Michigan State	4	–	4	5	–	7
Minnesota	3	–	5	7	–	5
Penn State	2	–	6	4	–	7
Illinois	1	–	7	3	–	8
Indiana	1	–	7	3	–	8
$ – BCS representative as conference champion; + – Conference co-champions; Rankings from AP Poll

The 2004 Penn State Nittany Lions football team represented the Pennsylvania State University in the 2004 NCAA Division I-A football season. The team's head coach was Joe Paterno. It played its home games at Beaver Stadium in University Park, Pennsylvania.

== Preseason ==
The spring saw some changes to the coaching staff. Offensive coordinator Fran Ganter was named the new Associate Athletic Director for Football Administration, after 37 years as a player and coach for Penn State. Former Penn State quarterback Galen Hall joined the coaching staff as the new offensive coordinator and running backs coach. Mike McQueary, another former Penn State quarterback, joins the staff as the wide receivers coach and will also serve as the recruiting coordinator.

In addition to the coaching changes, head coach Joe Paterno had his contract extended through the 2008 football season, despite having had three losing seasons in the past four.

Last season's second-leading receiver Maurice Humphrey was expelled from school and convicted of three counts of simple assault. He would not play another down for Penn State. Humphrey's expulsion created a void of experience at the wide receiver position. Senior Gerald Smith was the most experienced receiver, and he had only 15 catches in 2003.

Prior to the season, Zack Mills and Derek Wake were elected team co-captains by their teammates.

Penn State started the season unranked in both the AP and the Coaches college football preseason polls.

=== Recruiting class ===
College recruiting information
Name	Hometown	School	Height	Weight	40^{‡}	Commit date
Wyatt Bowman; OL	Mechanicsburg, Pennsylvania	Cumberland Valley HS	6 ft 6 in (1.98 m)	314 lb (142 kg)	5.20	Apr 26, 2003
Wyatt Bowman; OL	Recruit ratings: Scout: Rivals:					
Dontey Brown; LB	McKeesport, Pennsylvania	McKeesport Area SHS	6 ft 3 in (1.91 m)	252 lb (114 kg)	4.70	May 2, 2003
Dontey Brown; LB	Recruit ratings: Scout: Rivals:					
Gerald Cadogan; OL	Portsmouth, Ohio	Portsmouth HS	6 ft 7 in (2.01 m)	310 lb (140 kg)	5.10	Aug 8, 2003
Gerald Cadogan; OL	Recruit ratings: Scout: Rivals:					
Paul Cianciolo; QB	St. George, South Carolina	Dorchester Academy	6 ft 5 in (1.96 m)	228 lb (103 kg)	4.75	Dec 5, 2003
Paul Cianciolo; QB	Recruit ratings: Scout: Rivals:					
Dan Connor; LB	Wallingford, Pennsylvania	Strath Haven HS	6 ft 3 in (1.91 m)	215 lb (98 kg)	4.55	Aug 5, 2003
Dan Connor; LB	Recruit ratings: Scout: Rivals:					
Tony Davis; CB	Warren, Ohio	Howland HS	5 ft 11.5 in (1.82 m)	180 lb (82 kg)	4.40	May 13, 2003
Tony Davis; CB	Recruit ratings: Scout: Rivals:					
Josh Gaines; TE	Fort Wayne, Indiana	Northrop HS	6 ft 3 in (1.91 m)	253 lb (115 kg)	4.80	Aug 2, 2003
Josh Gaines; TE	Recruit ratings: Scout: Rivals:					
Matt Hahn; RB	Melville, New York	St. Anthony's HS	6 ft 1 in (1.85 m)	215 lb (98 kg)	4.50	Feb 20, 2003
Matt Hahn; RB	Recruit ratings: Scout: Rivals:					
Greg Harrison; OL	Shenandoah, Pennsylvania	Shenandoah Valley JSHS	6 ft 5 in (1.96 m)	299 lb (136 kg)	5.20	Apr 26, 2003
Greg Harrison; OL	Recruit ratings: Scout: Rivals:					
Jed Hill; TE	Struthers, Ohio	Struthers HS	6 ft 4 in (1.93 m)	247 lb (112 kg)	4.60	Jun 16, 2003
Jed Hill; TE	Recruit ratings: Scout: Rivals:					
Austin Hinton; OL	Secaucus, New Jersey	Secaucus HS	6 ft 4 in (1.93 m)	285 lb (129 kg)	5.00	Jul 1, 2003
Austin Hinton; OL	Recruit ratings: Scout: Rivals:					
Dan Lawlor; RB	Mechanicsburg, Pennsylvania	Cumberland Valley HS	6 ft 2.5 in (1.89 m)	235 lb (107 kg)	4.60	Jun 24, 2003
Dan Lawlor; RB	Recruit ratings: Scout: Rivals:					
Mike Lucian; TE	Frederick, Maryland	Linganore HS	6 ft 3 in (1.91 m)	255 lb (116 kg)	4.80	Jun 18, 2003
Mike Lucian; TE	Recruit ratings: Scout: Rivals:					
Jordan Lyons; TE	College Park, Georgia	Woodward Academy	6 ft 5 in (1.96 m)	225 lb (102 kg)	4.70	Jan 19, 2004
Jordan Lyons; TE	Recruit ratings: Scout: Rivals:					
Anthony Morelli; QB	Pittsburgh, Pennsylvania	Penn Hills SHS	6 ft 4 in (1.93 m)	216 lb (98 kg)	4.70	Feb 4, 2004
Anthony Morelli; QB	Recruit ratings: Scout: Rivals:					
Jordan Norwood; CB	State College, Pennsylvania	State College Area HS	5 ft 8.5 in (1.74 m)	143 lb (65 kg)	NA	Dec 20, 2003
Jordan Norwood; CB	Recruit ratings: Scout:					
Rich Ohrnberger; OL	East Meadow, New York	East Meadow HS	6 ft 3.5 in (1.92 m)	282 lb (128 kg)	4.90	Jul 12, 2003
Rich Ohrnberger; OL	Recruit ratings: Scout: Rivals:					
Spencer Ridenhour; S	White Plains, New York	White Plains SHS	6 ft 0 in (1.83 m)	212 lb (96 kg)	4.47	May 22, 2003
Spencer Ridenhour; S	Recruit ratings: Scout: Rivals:					
Elijah Robinson; DT	Camden, New Jersey	Woodrow Wilson HS	6 ft 3 in (1.91 m)	290 lb (130 kg)	NA	Jan 9, 2004
Elijah Robinson; DT	Recruit ratings: Scout: Rivals:					
Mark Rubin; WR	Amherst, New York	Amherst Central HS	6 ft 3 in (1.91 m)	205 lb (93 kg)	4.50	Jun 28, 2003
Mark Rubin; WR	Recruit ratings: Scout: Rivals:					
Tyrell Sales; LB	Butler, Pennsylvania	Butler Area SHS	6 ft 3 in (1.91 m)	243 lb (110 kg)	4.69	Aug 10, 2003
Tyrell Sales; LB	Recruit ratings: Scout: Rivals:					
A.Q. Shipley; DT	Coraopolis, Pennsylvania	Moon SHS	6 ft 2 in (1.88 m)	285 lb (129 kg)	4.96	Jun 18, 2003
A.Q. Shipley; DT	Recruit ratings: Scout: Rivals:					
Kevin Suhey; QB	State College, Pennsylvania	State College Area HS	6 ft 1 in (1.85 m)	195 lb (88 kg)	4.68	Dec 3, 2003
Kevin Suhey; QB	Recruit ratings: Scout: Rivals:					
Trent Varva; OL	Lake Orion, Michigan	Lake Orion Community HS	6 ft 3 in (1.91 m)	310 lb (140 kg)	5.00	Jul 8, 2003
Trent Varva; OL	Recruit ratings: Scout: Rivals:					
Overall recruit ranking: Scout: 12 Rivals: 14
‡ Refers to 40-yard dash; Note: In many cases, Scout, Rivals, 247Sports, On3, and ESPN may conflict in their listings of height, weight and 40 time.; In these cases, the average was taken. ESPN grades are on a 100-point scale.; Sources: "Penn State Commit List for 2004". Rivals.; "Scout.com Football Recruiting: Penn State". Scout.; "Scout.com Team Recruiting Rankings". Scout.; "2004 Team Ranking". Rivals.com.

== Schedule ==
Date	Time	Opponent	Site	TV	Result	Attendance
September 4	3:30 p.m.	Akron*	Beaver Stadium; University Park, PA	ESPN Plus	W 48–10	98,866
September 11	8:00 p.m.	at Boston College*	Alumni Stadium; Chestnut Hill, MA	ABC	L 7–21	44,500
September 18	12:00 p.m.	UCF*	Beaver Stadium; University Park, PA	ESPN Plus	W 37–13	101,715
September 25	5:45 p.m.	at No. 20 Wisconsin	Camp Randall Stadium; Madison, WI (College GameDay)	ESPN	L 3–16	82,179
October 2	8:00 p.m.	at No. 18 Minnesota	Hubert H. Humphrey Metrodome; Minneapolis, MN (Governor's Victory Bell)	ESPN Plus	L 7–16	50,386
October 9	4:30 p.m.	No. 9 Purdue	Beaver Stadium; University Park, PA	ESPN	L 13–20	108,183
October 23	12:00 p.m.	No. 25 Iowa^{†}	Beaver Stadium; University Park, PA	ESPN2	L 4–6	108,062
October 30	12:00 p.m.	at Ohio State	Ohio Stadium; Columbus, OH (rivalry)	ABC	L 10–21	104,947
November 6	12:00 p.m.	Northwestern	Beaver Stadium; University Park, PA	ESPN+	L 7–14	100,353
November 13	12:00 p.m.	at Indiana	Memorial Stadium; Bloomington, IN	ESPN Plus	W 22–18	24,092
November 20	12:00 p.m.	Michigan State	Beaver Stadium; University Park, PA (rivalry)	ESPN2	W 37–13	101,486
*Non-conference game; ^{†}Homecoming; Rankings from AP Poll released prior to the game; All times are in Eastern time

== Personnel ==
=== Roster ===
2004 Penn State Nittany Lions football team roster
Players
Coaches
Offense

Pos.	#	Name	Class
WR	2	Gio Vendemia	Jr
QB	3	Chris Ganter	Jr
QB	6	Mike Hart	Fr
QB	7	Zack Mills (C)	Sr
RB	8	Rodney Kinlaw	Fr
WR	9	Terrance Phillips	Jr
WR	11	Terrell Golden	Fr
QB	12	Michael Robinson	Jr
WR	13	Kinta Palmer	Jr
QB	14	Anthony Morelli	Fr
QB	15	Paul Cianciolo	Fr
WR	16	Dan Corrado	So
WR	17	Mike Baird	Jr
TE	18	Jordan Lynons	Fr
QB	19	Tom Lundquist	Jr
WR	19	Gerald Smith	Sr
TE	22	Jed Hill	Fr
WR	25	Brendan Perretta	Fr
RB	26	Tony Hunt	So
RB	28	Chris Wilson	So
RB	33	Austin Scott	So
RB	34	Matt Hahn	Fr
RB	36	Nick Pinchek	Fr
FB	38	Dan Lawlor	Fr
FB	39	Paul Jefferson	Sr
FB	42	Adam Senk	Jr
FB	47	Brian Gilmore	Jr
OT	50	Andrew Richardson	Jr
OL	51	Tim Harris	Fr
G	54	Scott Davis	Sr
OL	56	Austin Hinton	Fr
OT	58	Greg Harrison	Fr
G	59	Charles Rush	Jr
C	60	Patick Weber	Fr
OL	61	Ross Muir	Fr
OL	63	Joe Toriello	Fr
OL	64	Wyatt Bowman	Fr
G	65	Robert Price	So
C	66	Lance Antolick	Jr
OT	67	Levi Brown	So
OT	68	John Wilson	Jr
OL	69	Tommy Schnell	Fr
G	70	Nick Marmo	Sr
G	71	Mark Farris	So
OL	72	Trent Varva	Fr
OT	73	Joel Holler	Fr
G	74	Tyler Reed	Jr
OT	76	Gerald Cadogan	Fr
C	77	E.Z. Smith	Jr
OT	79	Chris Auletta	Fr
WR	80	Mark Rubin	Fr
TE	81	Isaac Smolko	Jr
WR	82	Vic Surma	So
WR	83	Ryan Scott	Sr
TE	87	John Bronson	Sr
TE	88	Kevin Darling	So
TE	98	Mike Pawlikowski	Sr

Defense

Pos.	#	Name	Class
CB	1	Anwar Phillips	Jr
DB	3	Deon Butler	Fr
S	5	Jim Kanuch	So
S	6	Donnie Johnson	So
S	10	Calvin Lowry	Jr
S	11	Jason Ganter	Fr
LB	14	Andy Kubic	So
CB	15	Brent Wise	Fr
CB	16	Tony Davis	Fr
DE	17	Lavon Chisley	Jr
S	18	Andrew Guman	Sr
CB	20	Marcus Mills	Jr
LB	20	Tim Shaw	So
CB	21	Alan Zemaitis	Jr
CB	22	Darien Hardy	So
S	24	Nolan McCready	So
S	27	Chris Harrell	Sr
S	29	Paul Cronin	Jr
LB	30	BranDon Snow	So
LB	31	Paul Posluszny	So
CB	35	John Royse	Jr
LB	35	J.R. Zwierzynski	So
DB	37	Spencer Ridenhour	Fr
LB	40	Dan Connor	Fr
DT	41	Scott Paxson	Jr
S	43	Ethan Kilmer	Jr
DE	44	Patrick Hall	So
LB	45	Pat Bedics	Fr
DB	46	Curt Reese	Jr
DL	46	Tyrell Sales	Fr
LB	48	Matt Pavelic	So
LB	49	Dorian Burton	Jr
LB	51	Joe Cianciolo	Jr
LB	52	Dontey Brown	Fr
DT	53	Steve Roach	So
DE	54	Amani Purcell	Fr
DE	55	Matthew Rice	Jr
LB	56	Mike Sothern	Fr
DL	62	Nick Daise	So
DL	69	Jason Robinson	Sr
DT	75	Lee Kuzemchak	So
DT	78	John Shaw	So
LB	84	Josh Gaines	Fr
DT	85	Jay Alford	So
DL	86	Mike Lucian	Fr
DL	91	Tamba Hali	Jr
DT	92	Ed Johnson	So
DL	93	A.Q. Shipley	Fr
LB	94	Derek Wake (C)	Sr
DT	95	Elijah Robinson	Fr
DL	96	Rich Ohrnberger	Fr

Special teams

Pos.	#	Name	Class
K	4	Robbie Gould	Sr
K	13	Patrick Humes	Fr
K	21	Joe Prokopik	Fr
K	23	Tony Bernatos	Fr
P	36	Jeremy Kapinos	So
P	49	Brandon Ream	So
LS	57	Chris Mauriello	Fr

Head coach

- Joe Paterno

Coordinators/assistant coaches

Legend

- (C) Team captain
- (S) Suspended
- (I) Ineligible
- Injured
- Redshirt

Roster
Last update: August 13, 2004

=== Coaching staff ===
- Joe Paterno – Head Coach
- Dick Anderson – Offensive Line (Guards and Centers)
- Tom Bradley – Defensive Coordinator and Cornerbacks
- Galen Hall – Offensive Coordinator and Running Backs
- Larry Johnson Sr. – Defensive Line
- Bill Kenney – Offensive Tackles and Tight Ends
- Mike McQueary – Wide Receivers and Recruiting Coordinator
- Brian Norwood – Safeties
- Jay Paterno – Quarterbacks
- Ron Vanderlinden – Linebackers
- John Thomas – Strength and Conditioning

== Game summaries ==
=== Akron ===
	1	2	3	4	Total
Akron	3	0	0	7	10
Penn State	21	20	7	0	48

The overwhelmed Zips find themselves behind 41–3 at halftime against Penn State, who subs in the backups, Penn State scores once in the third to make it 48–3, and Akron scores a late, meaningless touchdown against the Lions to bring the score to 48–10, with this being Galen Hall's first game as an offensive coordinator. This game gave Penn State fans false hope that their team was on the rebound from their 3–9 season last year. ESPN described the offense as "looking unstoppable", which led to the Lions being favored over Boston College the following week.

=== Boston College ===
	1	2	3	4	Total
Penn State	0	0	7	0	7
Boston College	7	7	7	0	21

Boston College takes a 14–0 halftime lead at home over the Nittany Lions, and then takes a 21–7 lead after three for the game's final points. Sloppy play on offense ultimately doomed Penn State as Boston College becomes the first of three teams to score 20 or more points on a defense that didn't allow more than 21 points all year and the only team to score 21 offensive points on the Nittany Lions.

=== UCF ===
	1	2	3	4	Total
UCF	3	3	0	7	13
Penn State	0	21	9	7	37

Despite sloppy play and mistakes, the Golden Knights couldn't help but find themselves blown out by a much better Penn State team. After falling behind 3–0 in the first quarter, the Nittany Lions make it 21–6 at halftime and 30–6 after three thanks to a touchdown and a safety. The backups are subbed in for the fourth, both teams score, and it's 37–13 as the final score.

=== Wisconsin ===
	1	2	3	4	Total
Penn State	0	0	3	0	3
Wisconsin	7	6	3	0	16

In a defensive game, three of Penn State's quarterbacks were injured. Zack Mills was knocked out for the game, sustained a concussion, and backup Michael Robinson was taken away in an ambulance after sustaining life-threatening injuries from a vicious hit. Third stringer Chris Ganter did little against the Badgers' defense with Penn State only managing a field goal in the third quarter, barely preserving their streak of games without being shut out. Wisconsin only scored 16 points, which was well below their average for the year.

=== Minnesota ===
	1	2	3	4	Total
Penn State	0	0	7	0	7
Minnesota	10	0	6	0	16

After the game, Minnesota players had said that they had not seen a defense of Penn State's caliber before, but won because of Penn State's offensive weaknesses, still, Penn State's defense kept them in the game for the majority of the game, which would be true for every game this season.

=== Purdue ===
	1	2	3	4	Total
Purdue	3	7	7	3	20
Penn State	0	10	3	0	13

Purdue managed only their second Big Ten win in history over Penn State by holding on for a 20–13 win at Beaver Stadium. It was a 10–10 tie and 17–13 after three, but Purdue's final field goal was enough to win it. Purdue's historic losses to Penn State include a loss in 2000 to a 5–7 Nittany Lions team while Purdue themselves were Big Ten champions, representing themselves at the Rose Bowl.

This game is also significant in the history of both Beaver Stadium and Penn State football for another reason not pertaining to the game itself. To try and draw extra excitement for the team, in what was a down year for the program, the athletic department asked the students to wear white to the game. Over 20,000 students participated in what would become the first ever White Out in school history.

=== Iowa ===
	1	2	3	4	Total
Iowa	3	3	0	0	6
Penn State	2	0	0	2	4

This is a game that by many Penn State fans was considered a low point for the football program because of the inept offenses and the fact that the only Penn State scores were defensive. The Penn State defense effectively shut down the Hawkeyes, forcing two first half field goals, but was unable to get anything going on offense. Penn State took a 2–0 lead on a safety early in the game, but the Hawkeyes had a field goal to make it 3–2, then another to make it 6–2 at halftime. The Hawkeyes barely gained any ground in the second half, and the Nittany Lions got their final two points from an elective safety in the fourth quarter because Iowa feared that Penn State would block the punt in the end zone, taking the lead on a touchdown, because they had already blocked a few punts that day. The strategy worked, Penn State coughed up the ball on their next drive and Iowa took a knee to kill the clock. While this game was a low point for Penn State, it was a big game for the Hawkeyes because head coach Kirk Ferentz's father died the week before.

While technically not an official White Out, students were encouraged to wear white again to this game. Participation was about the same as at the Purdue game and the loss resulted in a brief drop in the popularity of the event.

=== Ohio State ===
	1	2	3	4	Total
Penn State	0	7	0	3	10
Ohio State	14	7	0	0	21

Ohio State scored a defensive and special teams touchdown, but Penn State's defense mostly kept them out of the end zone in a 21–10 loss, one of two times they scored double digits in the Horseshoe as a Big 10 team, the other time being in 2008 where they won 13–6 to take control of the Big Ten race. Penn State actually outscored the Buckeyes 10–7 offensively.

=== Northwestern ===
	1	2	3	4	Total
Northwestern	7	0	0	7	14
Penn State	0	7	0	0	7

Penn State held the momentum and controlled the tempo of most of the game, but couldn't quite put the Wildcats away, despite having a few opportunities to, including a missed field goal and a drive that ended at the Northwestern 18, losing another close game 7–14.

=== Indiana ===
	1	2	3	4	Total
Penn State	7	0	7	8	22
Indiana	7	6	0	5	18

This is the game that is said to have turned Penn State's fortunes around. In the same way that the 1999 upset loss to Minnesota was believed to begin a downward spiral called "The Dark Years" by Penn State fans, this close game that ended with a four down goal line stand very late in the game, with Penn State clinging to a 22–16 lead, is said to have been the game that started Penn State on the winning track again and springboarded the team towards the 2005 Big Ten championship. Indiana managed a 13–7 halftime lead, but late in the game found themselves down 22–16, only scoring a field goal but leading 16–14 until Penn State took the lead on a late touchdown and two-point conversion. Penn State stopped Indiana four straight times at the goal line, eventually conceding a safety on the final play of the game to prevent Indiana from having a chance to win. Penn State's goal line stand at Indiana as a result of the momentum it gave the team is considered one of the best Penn State games.

=== Michigan State ===
	1	2	3	4	Total
Michigan State	3	3	0	7	13
Penn State	0	3	28	6	37

The Spartans of Michigan State were 5–5, hoping to become bowl eligible, and the only thing standing in their way was a 3–7 Penn State team who only had one Big Ten win, but the goal line stand at Indiana that led to the Penn State victory the previous week gave them the momentum to win this game big. After a slow first half where Michigan State led 6–3, Penn State rolled off 28 third quarter points to put the game out of reach, going up 31–6 on the Spartans thanks to a plethora of interceptions. Penn State would kick two more field goals in the last quarter while the Spartans scored a late touchdown against backups.

Again, this game also sheds some light on the history of the White Out. After losses against Purdue and Iowa earlier in the season, the athletic department changed strategy with a "Code Blue" dress code. This time, it was extended to all fans in the stadium and students went from dorm to dorm to spread the word. Despite winning the game, the tradition did not stick and fans went back to wearing white the following season.

== Awards ==
=== Watchlists ===
- Zack Mills
  Davey O'Brien Award watchlist
  Johnny Unitas Golden Arm Award watchlist
- Alan Zemaitis
  Jim Thorpe Award watchlist

=== Players ===
- Dan Connor
  First-team Sporting News Freshman All-American
  First-team FWAA Freshman All-American
- Andrew Guman
  First-team ESPN The Magazine CoSIDA Academic All-American
  ESPN The Magazine CoSIDA Academic All-District
- Tamba Hali
  Second-team All-Big Ten
- Paul Jefferson
  ESPN The Magazine CoSIDA Academic All-District
- Jeremy Kapinos
  Big Ten Special Teams Player of the Week (Oct. 30)
- Paul Posluszny
  Second-team All-Big Ten
  Big Ten Defensive Player of the Week (Nov. 13)
  ESPN The Magazine CoSIDA Academic All-District
- Alan Zemaitis
  Second-team All-Big Ten

== Postseason ==
The offense did not get going until the third quarter of the final game, but the defense finished the season in the top 10 in four NCAA statistical categories and was the only team in the nation to not allow more than 21 points a game. The Nittany Lion defense ranked fifth in scoring defense (15.3 points per game), ranked tenth in total defense (291.55 yards per game), ranked sixth in pass defense (162.3 ypg), ranked fourth in pass efficiency defense (99.8 rating), and held all 11 opponents below their total offense average.

Despite the losing record, Penn State ranked among the top four in attendance for the 14th consecutive year, averaging 103,111 in six home games, including attendances of 108,183 against Purdue and 108,062 against Iowa, the ninth and tenth largest crowds in Beaver Stadium history.

None of the departing players were drafted in the 2005 NFL draft, but a number of players signed with NFL teams as free agents.

=== All-star games ===
Game	Date	Site	Players
80th East–West Shrine Game	January 15, 2005	SBC Park, San Francisco	Andrew Guman
7th Gridiron Classic	January 15, 2005	The Villages Polo Stadium, The Villages, Florida	Paul Jefferson
59th Hula Bowl	January 22, 2005	War Memorial Stadium, Wailuku, Hawaii	Derek Wake
2nd Las Vegas All-American Classic	January 22, 2005	Sam Boyd Stadium, Las Vegas, Nevada	Zack Mills
