= Jason Jefferson =

American football player (born 1981)

No. 99
- Position: Defensive tackle

Personal information
- Born: December 20, 1981 (age 44); Chicago, Illinois, U.S.
- Listed height: 6 ft 1 in (1.85 m)
- Listed weight: 295 lb (134 kg)

Career information
- High school: Leo (Chicago)
- College: Wisconsin
- NFL draft: 2005: 6th round, 193rd overall pick

Career history
- New Orleans Saints (2005)*; Chicago Bears (2005)*; Philadelphia Eagles (2005)*; Buffalo Bills (2005–2007); Atlanta Falcons (2008)
- * Offseason or practice squad member only

Career NFL statistics
- Total tackles: 32
- Fumble recoveries: 1
- Stats at Pro Football Reference

Jason Jefferson (born December 20, 1981) is an American former professional football player who was a defensive tackle in the National Football League (NFL). He played college football for the Wisconsin Badgers and was selected by the New Orleans Saints in the sixth round of the 2005 NFL draft.

Jefferson was also a member of the Chicago Bears, Philadelphia Eagles, Buffalo Bills and Atlanta Falcons.

== Early life ==
Jason Jefferson is a graduate of Leo Catholic High School, located on the South Side of Chicago.
