= Brandon Coutu =

American football player (born 1984)

No. 10, 7, 6
- Position: Placekicker

Personal information
- Born: September 29, 1984 (age 42); Lawrenceville, Georgia, U.S.
- Listed height: 5 ft 11 in (1.80 m)
- Listed weight: 187 lb (85 kg)

Career information
- High school: Collins Hill (Suwanee, Georgia)
- College: Georgia
- NFL draft: 2008: 7th round, 235th overall pick

Career history
- Seattle Seahawks (2008); Seattle Seahawks (2011)*; Las Vegas Locomotives (2011); Jacksonville Jaguars (2011)*; Buffalo Bills (2011); Jacksonville Jaguars (2012)*; Las Vegas Locomotives (2012); Omaha Nighthawks (2012)
- * Offseason or practice squad member only

Awards and highlights
- Third-team All-American (2005); First-team All-SEC (2005)
- Stats at Pro Football Reference

Brandon Coutu (born September 29, 1984) is an American former professional football player who was a placekicker in the National Football League (NFL). He was selected by the Seattle Seahawks in the seventh round of the 2008 NFL draft. He played college football for the Georgia Bulldogs.

He was also a member of the Las Vegas Locomotives, Jacksonville Jaguars, Buffalo Bills, and Omaha Nighthawks.

== College career ==
At the University of Georgia, he kicked three field goals of over 50 yards, his longest was 58 yards. He never missed a PAT at Georgia and was the first kicker in Georgia history to have over 80% field goal accuracy. All these things were accomplished after turning down scholarships at other schools for soccer and being a walk-on on Georgia's football team.

== Professional career ==
=== Seattle Seahawks ===
Coutu was drafted by the Seattle Seahawks in the seventh round of the 2008 NFL draft with the 235th overall pick. He was one of only two kickers picked by NFL teams in that draft. He was waived by the team on September 5, 2009.

Coutu was re-signed by the Seahawks on July 30, 2011, to replace Olindo Mare. He was released on August 20.

=== Las Vegas Locomotives ===
On August 25, 2011, Coutu signed with the Las Vegas Locomotives.

=== Jacksonville Jaguars (first stint) ===
On December 12, 2011, Coutu was signed to the Jacksonville Jaguars practice squad.

=== Buffalo Bills ===
Coutu signed with the Buffalo Bills on December 28, 2011, to replace the injured Rian Lindell and Dave Rayner. He was Buffalo's third kicker of the season. He attempted his first NFL field goal on a New Years Day game against the New England Patriots, but missed. He was released following the season.

=== Jacksonville Jaguars (second stint) ===
He re-signed with the Jaguars in May 2012. He was waived on July 17 to make room for newly signed Josh Scobee.

=== Omaha Nighthawks ===
Coutu played for the Omaha Nighthawks in 2012.
