= Dave Rayner =

American football player (born 1982)

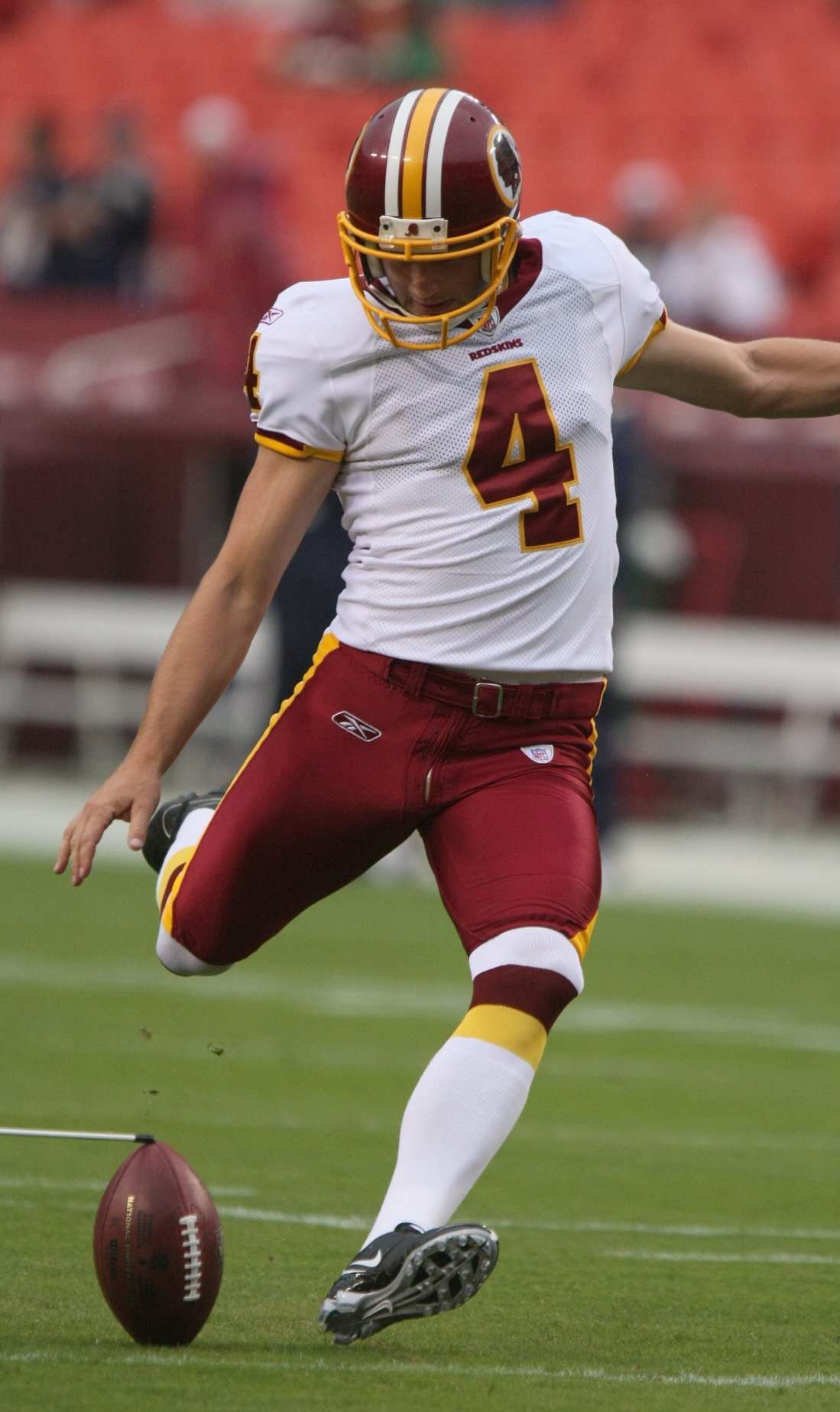
- Rayner with the Washington Redskins in 2009

No. 16, 6, 3, 5
- Position: Placekicker

Personal information
- Born: October 26, 1982 (age 44); Rochester, Michigan, U.S.
- Listed height: 6 ft 2 in (1.88 m)
- Listed weight: 215 lb (98 kg)

Career information
- High school: Oxford
- College: Michigan State (2001–2004)
- NFL draft: 2005: 6th round, 202nd overall pick

Career history
- Indianapolis Colts (2005); Green Bay Packers (2006); Kansas City Chiefs (2007); San Diego Chargers (2007); Miami Dolphins (2008)*; Detroit Lions (2008)*; Cincinnati Bengals (2008); Washington Redskins (2009)*; Cincinnati Bengals (2010)*; Detroit Lions (2010); Dallas Cowboys (2011)*; Oakland Raiders (2011); Buffalo Bills (2011)
- * Offseason or practice squad member only

Awards and highlights
- Second-team All-Big Ten (2004)

Career NFL statistics
- Field goals made: 65
- Field goals attempted: 90
- Field goal %: 72.22
- Longest field goal: 56
- Stats at Pro Football Reference

Dave Rayner (born October 26, 1982) is an American former professional football player who was a placekicker in the National Football League (NFL). He was selected by the Indianapolis Colts in the sixth round of the 2005 NFL draft. He played college football for the Michigan State Spartans.

== Early life ==
Rayner attended Oxford High School where he played as a kicker for the varsity football team. As a three-year starter he broke all but one school punting and placekicking record. He also played as a wide receiver, catching 13 passes for 210 yards and three touchdowns.

== College career ==
Rayner attended Michigan State University and graduated in 2004 with a major in kinesiology. He served as the football team's placekicker for four years and was a four-year letterman. He left Michigan State as the school's all-time leading scorer with 334 points.

== Professional career ==
=== Indianapolis Colts ===
Rayner was selected by the Indianapolis Colts in the sixth round (202nd overall) of the 2005 NFL draft, and served as the kickoff specialist for the Colts. He was released by the Colts on April 3, 2006.

=== Green Bay Packers ===
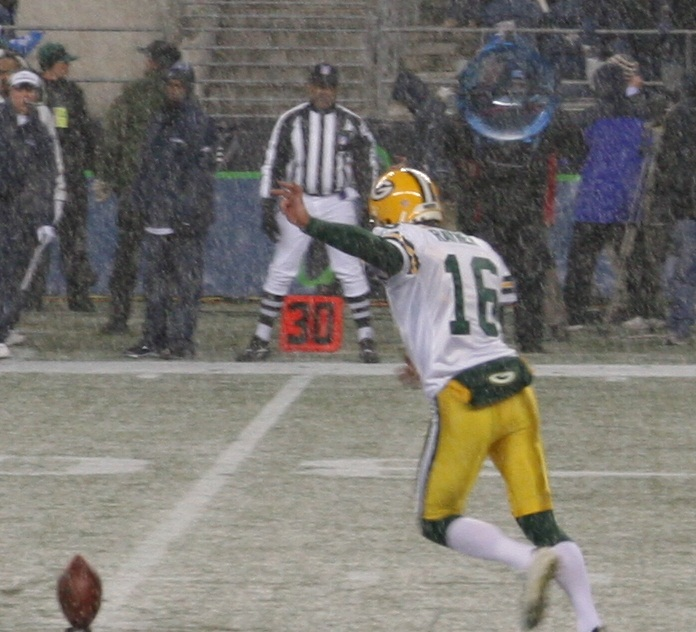
Dave Rayner, as a member of the Packers, kicks off during a Monday Night Football game in 2006.

Rayner was then signed by the Green Bay Packers on April 6, 2006. After Billy Cundiff was released, Rayner became the Packers' full-time kicker for the 2006 season.

It has been noted that Rayner has one of the stronger legs among NFL placekickers. During the 2006 season, he kicked a 54-yard field goal against the Philadelphia Eagles, tying the longest field goal in Packers' history (Ryan Longwell and Chris Jacke also have made 54-yard field goals). He also made a 55-yard field goal two weeks later against the Miami Dolphins; however, it was called back due to a defensive penalty that occurred before the snap, nullifying the play.

On September 1, 2007, the Packers released him in favor of highly touted rookie Mason Crosby.

=== Kansas City Chiefs ===
Nine days later, Rayner was signed by the Kansas City Chiefs to replace struggling rookie kicker Justin Medlock. After beginning the 2007 season with 13 field goals made in his first 16 attempts, he was released on November 26 after missing a fourth quarter attempt against rival Oakland. Rayner's inability to consistently make short field goals, with three misses from under 40 yards, was the primary reason for his departure from the Chiefs. He was replaced by veteran kicker John Carney.

=== San Diego Chargers ===
After being released from the Chiefs, Rayner signed a contract with the San Diego Chargers after full-time kicker Nate Kaeding was injured while making a tackle on a kickoff. With the Chargers, Rayner served as the kickoff specialist for the last two games of the regular season as well as the 2007–2008 playoffs.

=== Miami Dolphins ===
On March 11, 2008, Rayner was signed by the Miami Dolphins to compete with the incumbent, Jay Feely. However, Rayner was released on June 6, 2008, before training camp. Feely would be released in August 2008, as the Dolphins went with the undrafted rookie Dan Carpenter.

=== Detroit Lions (first stint) ===
Rayner was signed by the Detroit Lions on August 9, 2008, after the team waived punter Eddie Johnson to perform kicking duties during some pre-season games while kicker Jason Hanson was nursing an injury. He was once again released on August 26, 2008, as Hanson had recovered from his injury. He was 6 for 7 with the Lions during the pre-season.

=== Cincinnati Bengals (first stint) ===
Rayner was signed by the Cincinnati Bengals on October 11 while placekicker Shayne Graham nursed a groin injury. The team waived fullback Reagan Mauia to make room for Rayner. The Bengals released Rayner on October 21, as Graham had recovered from his groin injury. Rayner was 1-for-1 on field goals and 3-for-3 on extra points during his stint with Cincinnati.

=== Washington Redskins ===
Rayner was signed by the Washington Redskins on February 3, 2009, before the Redskins re-signed Shaun Suisham. Rayner was released on September 5, 2009, after signing an injury contract which prevented him from signing another contract in the 2009 season.

=== Cincinnati Bengals (second stint) ===
Rayner was re-signed by the Bengals on February 13, 2010, when the Bengals did not re-sign Shayne Graham. Rayner was released on September 4, 2010, as the Bengals preferred Mike Nugent.

=== Detroit Lions (second stint) ===
Rayner was signed on November 9, 2010, to fill in for the injured Jason Hanson.

In a December 19, 2010 game against the Tampa Bay Buccaneers, Rayner kicked a game-tying field goal as time expired in the 4th quarter. He then kicked a game-winning field goal in sudden death overtime. He became the first Lions kicker to accomplish this feat. The win ended the Lions NFL-record 26 game road losing streak.

On January 2, 2011, against the Minnesota Vikings, Rayner kicked a career-long 55-yard field goal. Only Jason Hanson had kicked a longer field goal as Lions kicker.

On August 29, 2011, Rayner was released by the Lions.

=== Dallas Cowboys ===
On August 30, 2011, Rayner signed as a free agent with the Dallas Cowboys, becoming one of four kickers in training camp along with Dan Bailey, David Buehler and Shayne Graham. On September 3, he was released after missing two field goals in the last game of preseason, as he was passed on the depth chart by the undrafted free agent Bailey.

=== Oakland Raiders ===
On October 22, 2011, Rayner was signed by the Oakland Raiders after their starting kicker Sebastian Janikowski suffered a hamstring injury. He didn't score as the Raiders were shut out by the Chiefs. He was waived on October 25.

=== Buffalo Bills ===
On November 8, 2011, Rayner was signed by the Buffalo Bills after their starting kicker Rian Lindell suffered a shoulder injury the previous Sunday against the New York Jets. In his second game as a Bill, Rayner made a 56-yard field goal.

Rayner missed 2 first-quarter field goals early in the Bills Christmas Eve game versus Denver. Rayner himself would be injured in that game, forcing the Bills to place Rayner on injured reserve and hire yet another kicker (Brandon Coutu) for the final game. Following the season, Rayner was not retained; Buffalo re-signed Lindell and added John Potter to the roster for 2012.
