= Fred Gibson (American football) =

American football and basketball player (born 1981)

No. 11
- Position: Wide receiver

Personal information
- Born: October 26, 1981 (age 45); Waycross, Georgia, U.S.
- Listed height: 6 ft 4 in (1.93 m)
- Listed weight: 202 lb (92 kg)

Career information
- High school: Waycross (GA) Ware County
- College: Georgia
- NFL draft: 2005: 4th round, 131st overall pick

Career history
- Pittsburgh Steelers (2005)*; Miami Dolphins (2005–2006)*; Atlanta Falcons (2007)*; St. Louis Rams (2007)*; New York Giants (2007)*; Edmonton Eskimos (2008)*
- * Offseason or practice squad member only

Awards and highlights
- First-team All-SEC (2004)

Fred Gibson (born October 26, 1981) is an American former professional football wide receiver and former NBA D-League guard. He played college football and basketball at Georgia.

== College career ==
Gibson attended University of Georgia and majored in Speech Communications.

As a member of the Bulldogs' football team, Gibson wore jersey #82. During his senior year, he led the team with seven touchdowns and caught 49 passes for 801 yards. During Gibson's tenure with the Bulldogs' football team, they posted a 42–10 record

Gibson also played one season of basketball for the Bulldogs as a walk-on freshman in 2001. In 18 games, Gibson averaged 4.9 points per game.

Gibson was also one of nine other UGA football team players to be declared ineligible for selling his SEC championship ring.

== Professional football career ==
=== Pittsburgh Steelers ===
He was selected by the Pittsburgh Steelers in the fourth round of the 2005 NFL draft. On May 31, 2005, Gibson signed a three-year, $1.221 million contract with the Steelers, which included a signing bonus of $296,000 and a yearly salary of $230,000 in 2005–06, $310,000 in 2006–07, and $385,000 in 2007–08. Receivers coach Bruce Arians thought Gibson "had great upside", and that "has the height, the speed, and the ability to go long." He was cut by the Steelers on September 3, 2005, and was signed to the Dolphins practice squad Miami Dolphins' practice squad two days later.

=== Miami Dolphins ===
Gibson remained with the Dolphins' practice squad during the 2005–06 season. He was waived by the team during final roster cuts prior to the 2006–07 season. On September 3, 2006, once Gibson cleared waivers, he was reassigned to the Dolphins' practice squad.

=== Atlanta Falcons ===
After his Dolphins' practice squad contract expired on January 8, 2007, he was signed by the Atlanta Falcons on February 17, 2007. Gibson was cut three days into training camp after missing a mandatory spring meeting and for other unspecified reasons.

=== St Louis Rams ===
Gibson signed with the St. Louis Rams on August 6, 2007, and was released by the team on August 31, 2007.

=== New York Giants ===
Shortly after being released from the Rams, Gibson signed a practice squad contract with the New York Giants on September 3, 2007. He was released five days later

== NBA D-League ==
Gibson was selected with the 3rd pick of the 10th round (147th pick overall) of the 2008 NBA Development League draft by the Albuquerque Thunderbirds. In 45 games with the Thunderbirds, Gibson averaged 7.3 points per game and 1.2 blocks per game. Gibson left the team in March, and signed with the Austin Toros in April. Gibson played three games with the Toros and was held scoreless.

Gibson was invited back to the Toros for the 2009-10 NBA-D season, but was released before the season started.
