= Anttaj Hawthorne =

American football player (born 1981)

No. 77
- Position: Defensive tackle

Personal information
- Born: November 15, 1981 (age 44); Hamden, Connecticut, U.S.
- Listed height: 6 ft 3 in (1.91 m)
- Listed weight: 310 lb (141 kg)

Career information
- High school: Hamden
- College: Wisconsin
- NFL draft: 2005: 6th round, 175th overall pick

Career history
- Oakland Raiders (2005–2006); → Frankfurt Galaxy (2006); Arizona Rattlers (2008, 2010–2016)

Awards and highlights
- World Bowl champion (2006); 3× ArenaBowl champion (2012–2014); First-team All-Arena (2011); Second-team All-Arena (2010); Third-team All-American (2004); 2× First-team All-Big Ten (2003, 2004)

Career NFL statistics
- Tackles: 15
- Stats at Pro Football Reference

Career AFL statistics
- Tackles: 118.5
- Sacks: 26.5
- Forced fumbles: 7
- Stats at ArenaFan.com

Anttaj Hawthorne (born November 15, 1981) is an American former professional football player who was a defensive tackle for the Oakland Raiders of the National Football League (NFL). He played college football for the Wisconsin Badgers, and was selected by the Raiders in the sixth round of the 2005 NFL draft. Hawthorne also played for the Arizona Rattlers of the Arena Football League (AFL).

== Early life ==
Hawthorne attended Hamden High School in Hamden, Connecticut, his hometown. He played on the varsity football team all four years of his high school career and was a member of the 2000 New Haven Register All-State football team. He got a scholarship to the University of Wisconsin–Madison. Anttaj participated in the first ever U.S. Army All-American Bowl game on December 30, 2000.

== College career ==
Hawthorne starred at the University of Wisconsin–Madison for four years. He was a team leader and a standout player. Originally a Nose-tackle in his freshman year, later moved to left defensive tackle where he started 41 consecutive games. Earned third-team All-American honors during his senior year and was also named All-Big Ten Conference three times, including a first-team selection as a junior, and a consensus selection as a senior. His senior year, he was named team captain and later received the team's Jay Seiler Coaches Appreciation Award. He finished his college career with a total of 201 tackles, 42 of which for a loss, 12 quarterback sacks, 2 forced fumbles, and 1 interception. Currently 6th place on Wisconsin–Madison's all-time list with 42 tackles for a loss.

== Professional career ==
=== Oakland Raiders ===
Hawthorne was selected by the Oakland Raiders in the sixth round of the 2005 NFL draft with the 175th overall pick. He spent most of the 2005 season on the Raiders practice squad before finally being signed to the active roster on December 2. He was active for two games his first season, registering two assists in the Raiders regular season finale against the Giants.

In March 2006, he was allocated by the Raiders to the Frankfurt Galaxy of the NFL Europe, where he helped the team win their fourth World Bowl.

Hawthorne appeared in all 16 games for the Raiders in 2006, recording 13 tackles. He was waived by the team on September 1, 2007.

=== Arizona Rattlers ===
Hawthorne signed with the Arizona Rattlers of the Arena Football League in 2008, recording nine tackles, a sack and a fumble recovery during his rookie season. On August 10, 2012, Hawthorne and the Rattlers won ArenaBowl XXV over the Philadelphia Soul one year after losing ArenaBowl XXIV to the Jacksonville Sharks. The Rattlers returned to a 3rd straight ArenaBowl in 2013, defeating the Soul once again. On March 9, 2016, Hawthorne was assigned to the Rattlers.
