= Kendrick Jones =

American gridiron football player (born 1982)

Kendrick Jones (born November 30, 1982, in East St. Louis, Illinois) is a former wide receiver who played for the BC Lions of the Canadian Football League. He signed as a free agent with BC on July 10, 2006. Jones appeared in 40 games (2002-2005) at the University of Illinois racking up 69 receptions for 983 yards and six touchdowns. His best season came as a junior in 2004 when he notched 47 catches for 687 yards and five touchdowns, good enough for seventh place among Big Ten receivers that season.
