= Scott Starks =

American football player (born 1983)

No. 20, 31
- Position: Cornerback

Personal information
- Born: June 27, 1983 (age 43); St. Louis, Missouri, U.S.
- Listed height: 5 ft 9 in (1.75 m)
- Listed weight: 176 lb (80 kg)

Career information
- High school: Hazelwood East (St. Louis)
- College: Wisconsin
- NFL draft: 2005: 3rd round, 87th overall pick

Career history
- Jacksonville Jaguars (2005–2009)

Awards and highlights
- First-team All-Big Ten (2004)

Career NFL statistics
- Total tackles: 73
- Forced fumbles: 2
- Pass deflections: 6
- Interceptions: 2
- Defensive touchdowns: 1
- Stats at Pro Football Reference

Scott Starks (born July 23, 1983) is an American former professional football player who was a cornerback for the Jacksonville Jaguars of the National Football League (NFL). He was selected by the Jaguars in the third round of the 2005 NFL draft with the 87th overall pick. Jason Fletcher of B&F Sports was his agent. He is known for recovering a Kyle Orton fumble and running it back for a touchdown to help the Wisconsin Badgers defeat the Purdue Boilermakers in the 2004 season. Starks was also a track star at the Wisconsin, where he competed in the 100 meters, posting a personal best of 10.64 seconds.
