= Chris Pazan =

American football player and coach (born 1983)

Biographical details
- Born: October 21, 1983 (age 42); Chicago, Illinois, U.S.

Playing career
- 2002-2005: Illinois
- Position: Quarterback

Chris Pazan (born October 21, 1983) is a former starting quarterback and former assistant coach for the University of Illinois. Pazan attended Brother Rice High School in Chicago, Illinois from 2000 to 2002, after transferring from St. Laurence High School in Burbank, Illinois. During his senior year, Pazan threw 2,500 yards with only one interception in 12 games. In his high school career he threw for over 4,800 yards and 35 touchdowns. Pazan was named a consensus High School All-American by Tom Lemming and many other football publications. Pazan was rated among the top 15 quarterbacks in the nation. Pazan chose to attend the University of Illinois over the University of Michigan, Northern Illinois and Notre Dame.

Pazan attended the University of Illinois from 2002 to 2005 and earned a degree in Sports Management. Currently he is working on his master's degree at the University of Illinois in Sports Management. Pazan started/played in 21 games over his career. In his first game action he was 8–8 for 112 yards against Purdue University. His first start was at the University of Michigan as a redshirt freshman at Homecoming in front of a crowd of 111,000, where he was 11–20 for 124 yards and an interception. His career high was throwing for 2 touchdowns and 278 yards against Northwestern University and 18–26 for 247 yards with 1 touchdown and an interception at the University of Wisconsin. Pazan was the assistant quarterbacks coach and Offensive Quality Control Graduate Assistant at the University of Illinois for head coach Ron Zook and offensive coordinator Mike Locksley from 2006 to 2008, when University of Illinois went to the 2008 Rose Bowl game vs USC. He is already being recognized at one of the bright, young coaches at the college level.

Pazan took the job as offensive coordinator and quarterbacks coach at Division II St. Joseph's College in Rensselaer, Indiana from 2009 to 2010. Pazan ran the West Coast Offense attack, similar to the one that he ran when he started at QB for the University of Illinois under former head coach Ron Turner.

Pazan in his first year as the offensive coordinator for St. Josephs College was named the GLVC Conference Assistant Coach of the Year, for an offense that averaged 32 points per game, and 387 yards of total offense per game.

On May 28, 2025, Pazan was arrested after allegedly stealing $300 worth of baseball cards from a Meijer store in Evergreen Park, Illinois.
