= Matt Trannon =

American basketball and football player (born 1983)

No. 18
- Position: Wide receiver

Personal information
- Born: July 7, 1983 (age 43); Flint, Michigan, U.S.
- Listed height: 6 ft 6 in (1.98 m)
- Listed weight: 235 lb (107 kg)

Career information
- High school: Flint Northern
- College: Michigan State
- NFL draft: 2007: undrafted

Career history
- Arizona Cardinals (2007)*; Kansas City Chiefs (2007)*; Oakland Raiders (2007)*; Pittsburgh Steelers (2008)*
- * Offseason or practice squad member only

Matthew Horise Trannon Jr. (born July 7, 1983) is an American former football wide receiver. He was signed by the Arizona Cardinals as an undrafted free agent in 2007. He played college football as well as basketball at Michigan State.

Trannon was also a member of the Kansas City Chiefs, Oakland Raiders and Pittsburgh Steelers.

== Early life ==
He was ranked among the nation's top 20 prep basketball players by ESPN.com (No. 18), and ranked as the nation's 34th best wide receivers by Rivals.com. He was named the top high school athlete in the nation by Prep Spotlight after starring in both football and basketball at Flint Northern High School. In basketball, he averaged 19 points and 11 rebounds, in football he caught 30 passes for 700 yards and 7 touchdowns as a senior.

== College career ==
=== Basketball ===
Trannon did not join the basketball team until he was a sophomore where he played in 17 games, averaging 6.9 minutes per contest averaged 1.2 points and 1.6 rebounds per contest. During his junior year, he shot 68.8 percent (22-of-32) from the field, tops among teammates with at least 30 field-goal attempts. He has played in 2 NCAA Tournaments, including an appearance in the Final Four during 2004–2005. Trannon decided to forgo his senior year of basketball to prepare for the 2007 NFL draft.

=== Football ===
Trannon started 11 games at wide receiver, ranked second on the team with 36 receptions for 405 yards and two touchdowns in his junior year. He caught 28 passes for 259 yards in 2003 caught passes in nine different games. During his senior year, he set the Michigan State single game reception record with 14 receptions against Eastern Michigan University, and also became MSU's all time receptions leader with 148 receptions. In addition, he was second on the team in receptions (44), receiving yards (502) and touchdown catches (3).

== Professional career ==
=== Football ===
==== Arizona Cardinals ====
Despite not being taken in the 2007 NFL draft, Trannon signed with the Arizona Cardinals. He was released on August 31, 2007, but was signed to the Cardinals practice squad.

==== Pittsburgh Steelers ====
On January 18, 2008, he signed with the Pittsburgh Steelers. However, he was waived on July 24.

=== Basketball ===
==== Bendigo Telstra Braves ====
Trannon signed as an 'import player' with the Bendigo Braves basketball team, based in Bendigo, Australia in 2009.

== Personal ==
He is the son of Katherine & Matthew Trannon(deceased) and cousin of former NFL player Lonnie Young.
