= Jonathan Clinkscale =

American football player (born 1982)

No. 62
- Position: Right guard

Personal information
- Born: 1982 (age 43–44)
- Listed height: 6 ft 2 in (1.88 m)
- Listed weight: 315 lb (143 kg)

Career information
- High school: John Muir High School
- College: Wisconsin
- NFL draft: 2005: undrafted

Career history
- Tampa Bay Buccaneers (2005)*; Cincinnati Bengals (2005)*; Tampa Bay Buccaneers (2005–2006)*; Rhein Fire (2007); Tampa Bay Buccaneers (2007)*; Orlando Predators (2008)
- * Offseason or practice squad member only

Jonathan Clinkscale (born 1982) is an American former football right guard. He played college football at University of Wisconsin. He went undrafted and played professionally for the Tampa Bay Buccaneers and the Cincinnati Bengals of the National Football League (NFL).

== Early life ==
Clinksale's parents divorced when he was young. He has a fraternal twin sister, Aja Brown, who was mayor of Compton, California from 2013 to 2021.

== Professional career ==
=== Tampa Bay Buccaneers ===
Clinkscale was signed by the Tampa Bay Buccaneers after going undrafted in the 2005 NFL draft.

=== Rhein Fire ===
Clinkscale signed with Rhein Fire of the National Football League Europa in 2007.

=== Orlando Predators ===
Clinkscale signed with the Orlando Predators of the Arena Football League in 2008.

== Personal life ==
Clinkscale currently resides in Madison, Wisconsin and works for the Madison Fire Department.
