= 2004 Michigan Wolverines football team =

American college football season

2004 Michigan Wolverines football

Big Ten co-champion

Rose Bowl, L 37–38 vs. Texas
- Conference: Big Ten Conference

Ranking
- Coaches: No. 12
- AP: No. 14
- Record: 9–3 (7–1 Big Ten)
- Head coach: Lloyd Carr (10th season)
- Offensive coordinator: Terry Malone (3rd season)
- Offensive scheme: Multiple
- Defensive coordinator: Jim Herrmann (8th season)
- Base defense: Multiple
- MVP: Braylon Edwards
- Captains: David Baas; Marlin Jackson
- Home stadium: Michigan Stadium

2004 Big Ten Conference football standings
	Conf.			Overall
Team	W		L	W		L
No. 14 Michigan $+	7	–	1	9	–	3
No. 8 Iowa +	7	–	1	10	–	2
No. 17 Wisconsin	6	–	2	9	–	3
Northwestern	5	–	3	6	–	6
No. 20 Ohio State	4	–	4	8	–	4
Purdue	4	–	4	7	–	5
Michigan State	4	–	4	5	–	7
Minnesota	3	–	5	7	–	5
Penn State	2	–	6	4	–	7
Illinois	1	–	7	3	–	8
Indiana	1	–	7	3	–	8
$ – BCS representative as conference champion; + – Conference co-champions; Rankings from AP Poll

The 2004 Michigan Wolverines football team was an American football team that represented the University of Michigan as a member of the Big Ten Conference during the 2004 NCAA Division I-A football season. In their tenth season under head coach Lloyd Carr, the Wolverines compiled a 9–3 record (7–1 in conference games), outscored opponents by a total of 370 to 279, and tied with Iowa for the Big Ten championship. Having beaten Iowa during the regular season, the Wolverines received the Big Ten's berth in the 2005 Rose Bowl where they lost to No. 6 Texas by a 38–37 score.

The Wolverines were ranked No. 8 in the preseason AP poll, dropped to No. 19 after an early loss to Notre Dame and a narrow victory over San Diego State, rose to No. 9 after winning eight straight games, and finished the season at No. 14 following losses to Ohio State and Texas.

Wide receiver Braylon Edwards led the Big Ten with 1,330 receiving yards, won the Biletnikoff Award as the best receiver in college football, and received the Chicago Tribune Silver Football as the most valuable player in the Big Ten. Center David Baas won the Rimington Trophy. Running back Mike Hart led the Big Ten with 1,455 rushing yards and was named Big Ten Freshman of the Year. Quarterback Chad Henne tied a school record with 25 touchdown passes.

Four Michigan players received first-team honors on the 2004 All-America team: Braylon Edwards; David Baas; cornerback Marlin Jackson; and safety Ernest Shazor. Nine Michigan players received first-team All-Big Ten honors: Mike Hart; Braylon Edwards; David Baas; Marlin Jackson; Ernest Shazor; offensive guard Matt Lentz; offensive tackle Adam Stenavich; tight end Tim Massaquoi; and defensive lineman Gabe Watson.

== Schedule ==
Date	Time	Opponent	Rank	Site	TV	Result	Attendance
September 4	12:00 p.m.	Miami (OH)*	No. 8	Michigan Stadium; Ann Arbor, MI	ABC	W 43–10	110,815
September 11	3:30 p.m.	at Notre Dame*	No. 8	Notre Dame Stadium; Notre Dame, IN (rivalry)	NBC	L 20–28	80,795
September 18	12:00 p.m.	San Diego State*	No. 17	Michigan Stadium; Ann Arbor, MI	ESPN	W 24–21	109,432
September 25	3:30 p.m.	Iowa	No. 19	Michigan Stadium; Ann Arbor, MI	ABC	W 30–17	111,428
October 2	3:30 p.m.	at Indiana	No. 19	Memorial Stadium; Bloomington, IN	ABC	W 35–14	35,001
October 9	12:00 p.m.	No. 13 Minnesota^{†}	No. 14	Michigan Stadium; Ann Arbor, MI (Little Brown Jug)	ESPN	W 27–24	111,518
October 16	12:00 p.m.	at Illinois	No. 14	Memorial Stadium; Champaign, Il (rivalry)	ABC	W 30–19	55,725
October 23	3:30 p.m.	at No. 12 Purdue	No. 13	Ross–Ade Stadium; West Lafayette, IN	ABC	W 16–14	65,170
October 30	3:30 p.m.	Michigan State	No. 12	Michigan Stadium; Ann Arbor, MI (rivalry)	ABC	W 45–37 ^{3OT}	111,609
November 13	12:10 p.m.	Northwestern	No. 9	Michigan Stadium; Ann Arbor, MI (rivalry)	ABC	W 42–20	111,347
November 20	1:00 p.m.	at Ohio State	No. 7	Ohio Stadium; Columbus, OH (The Game)	ABC	L 21–37	105,456
January 1, 2005	5:00 p.m.	vs. No. 6 Texas*	No. 13	Rose Bowl; Pasadena, CA (Rose Bowl)	ABC	L 37–38	93,468
*Non-conference game; ^{†}Homecoming; Rankings from AP Poll released prior to the game; All times are in Eastern time

== Game summaries ==
=== Miami (OH) ===
Miami (OH) at #8/#7 Michigan

Team	1	2	3	4	Total
Miami (OH)	0	0	3	7	10
• Michigan	0	10	14	19	43

- Date: September 4
- Location: Michigan Stadium, Ann Arbor, MI
- Game start: 12:00 p.m. EST
- Game attendance: 110,815
- TV announcers (ABC): Mike Tirico (play-by-play), Terry Bowden (color), Tim Brant (color), Sam Ryan (sideline)
- Source: ESPN

Scoring summary
2	6:53	MICH	Garrett Rivas 31-yard field goal	MICH 3–0
2	4:48	MICH	David Underwood 1-yard run (Garrett Rivas kick)	MICH 10–0
3	12:25	MICH	David Underwood 1-yard run (Garrett Rivas kick)	MICH 17–0
3	6:47	MICH	Braylon Edwards 20-yard pass from Chad Henne (Garrett Rivas kick)	MICH 24–0
3	0:06	M-OH	Jared Parseghian 36-yard field goal	MICH 24–3
4	12:38	M-OH	Mike Smith 1-yard run (Todd Soderquist kick)	MICH 24–10
4	9:01	MICH	Ernest Shazor 88-yard interception return (kick failed)	MICH 30–10
4	7:22	MICH	Braylon Edwards 13-yard pass from Chad Henne (kick failed)	MICH 36–10
4	6:16	MICH	Jerome Jackson 1-yard run (Garrett Rivas kick)	MICH 43–10

On September 4, Michigan opened its season with a 43–10 victory over Miami (OH) before a crowd of 110,815 at Michigan Stadium. After an injury to Matt Gutierrez, Chad Henne became the second true freshman quarterback (after Rick Leach in 1975) to start a season opener for Michigan. Henne completed 14 of 24 passes for 142 yards, two touchdowns, and one interception. Braylon Edwards caught six of Henne's passes for 91 yards and two touchdowns and described Henne after the game as "a special kind of person, a guy you automatically have faith in."

Michigan's defense created seven turnovers (five interceptions), including two interceptions by Markus Curry and an 88-yard interception return for a touchdown by Ernest Shazor. Aided by the turnovers, Michigan had five scoring drives of less than 20 yards. It was the most turnovers forced by a Michigan defense since October 5, 1985.

Statistics	MU	UM
First downs	13	14
Plays–yards	65–250	68–274
Rushes–yards	–33	40–133
Passing yards	217	159
Passing: comp–att–int	19–40–5	16–28–1
Turnovers		
Time of possession	27:56	32:04

Team	Category	Player	Statistics
Miami (OH)	Passing	Josh Betts	18/36 201 yds. 4 INT
Miami (OH)	Rushing	Luke Clemens	13 carries, 32 yards
Miami (OH)	Receiving	Martin Nance	5 receptions, 63 yards
Michigan	Passing	Chad Henne	14/24 142 yds., 2 TD, 1 INT
Michigan	Rushing	David Underwood	22 carries, 61 yards, 2 TD
Michigan	Receiving	Braylon Edwards	6 receptions, 91 yards, 2 TD

=== Notre Dame ===
Michigan at Notre Dame

Team	1	2	3	4	Total
Michigan	6	3	3	8	20
• Notre Dame	0	0	7	21	28

- Date: September 11
- Location: Notre Dame Stadium
- Game start: 3:30 p.m. EST
- Game attendance: 80,795
- Television network: ABC

Scoring summary
1	8:29	MICH	Garrett Rivas 38-yard field goal	MICH 3–0
1	0:11	MICH	Rivas 33-yard field goal	MICH 6–0
2	0:00	MICH	Rivas 22-yard field goal	MICH 9–0
3	11:02	ND	Matt Shelton 46-yard pass from Brady Quinn (D.J. Fitzgerald kick)	MICH 9–7
3	5:57	MICH	Rivas 47-yard field goal	MICH 12–7
4	13:48	ND	Darius Walker 6-yard run (Fitzpatrick kick)	ND 14–12
4	11:23	ND	Walker 5-yard run (Fitzpatrick kick)	ND 21–12
4		ND	Rashon Powers-Neal 8-yard pass from Quinn (Fitpatrick kick)	ND 28–12
4	2:32	MICH	Steve Breaston 25-yard pass from Chad Henne (Breaston pass from Henne for two-point conversion)	ND 28–20

On September 11, No. 8 Michigan lost to Tyrone Willingham's Notre Dame Fighting Irish, 28–20, before a crowd of 80,795 at Notre Dame Stadium.

Michigan led, 9–0, at halftime, with three field goals by Garrett Rivas. Brady Quinn and Darius Walker led the Fighting Irish to 21 points in a fourth-quarter comeback. Quinn passed for 178 yards, two touchdowns, and three interceptions. Walker rushed for 115 yards and a touchdown.

Braylon Edwards had 12 receptions for 126 yards, but Michigan's running game was stymied, and the Wolverines settled for four field goals. Starting running back David Underwood sustained a head injury on a block in the backfield on Michigan's second offensive play. Backups Jerome Jackson and Pierre Rembert were limited to 32 and 23 yards, respectively. After the game, Lloyd Carr told reporters: "We can't run the football, and, until you can run, you're going to have a hard time. You can't win on field goals." (True freshman Mike Hart emerged as the team's lead back in the following game.)

Statistics	UM	ND
First downs	15	13
Plays–yards	70–296	61–313
Rushes–yards	30–56	40–135
Passing yards	240	178
Passing: comp–att–int	25–40–1	10–21–3
Turnovers		
Time of possession	32:38	27:22

Team	Category	Player	Statistics
Michigan	Passing	Chad Henne	25/40 240 yds., 1 TD, 1 INT
Michigan	Rushing	Jerome Jackson	15 carries, 32 yards
Michigan	Receiving	Braylon Edwards	12 receptions, 129 yds.
Notre Dame	Passing	Brady Quinn	10/20 178 yds., 2 TD, 3 INT
Notre Dame	Rushing	Darius Jackson	31 carries, 115 yds., 1 TD
Notre Dame	Receiving	Maurice Stovall	5 receptions, 82 yds.

=== San Diego State ===
SDSU at Michigan

Team	1	2	3	4	Total
San Diego State	14	7	0	0	21
• Michigan	17	0	7	0	24

- Date: September 18
- Location: Michigan Stadium
- Game start: 12:00 p.m. EST
- Game attendance: 109,432
- Television network: ESPN

Scoring summary
1	13:20	MICH	Braylon Edwards 54-yard pass from Chad Henne (kick)	MICH 7–0
1	10:37	SDSU	Michael Franklin 1-yard run (Garrett Palmer kick)	TIE 7–7
1	3:45	MICH	Garrett Rivas 39-yard field goal	MICH 10–7
1	2:51	MICH	Lawrence Reid fumble recovery and five-yard return (Rivas kick)	MICH 17–7
1	1:21	SDSU	Jeff Webb 12-yard pass from Michael Franklin (Palmer kick)	MICH 17–14
2	7:57	SDSU	Ortiz 14-yard pass from Dlugolecki (Palmer kick)	SDSU 21–17
3	10:35	MICH	Edwards 7-yard pass from Henne (Rivas kick)	MICH 24–21

On September 18, Michigan defeated Tom Craft's San Diego State Aztecs, 24–21, before a crowd of 109,432 at Michigan Stadium. Michigan gave up 21 first-half points and trailed, 21–17, at halftime. The defense tightened and held the Aztecs to 68 yards of offense and zero points in the second half.

The game featured the debut of true freshman tailback Mike Hart as a major offensive weapon. In the first two games of the season, Hart had only eight carries, and Michigan averaged only 85.5 rushing yards per game and ranked 94th out of 117 Division I teams in rushing offense. Hart got the start against San Diego State after David Underwood sustained a concussion against Notre Dame and gained 121 yards on 25 carries. After the game, Hart noted: "It's a dream come true. I have family from Detroit, and I've always been a Michigan fan since I was young."

Quarterback Chad Henne threw three interceptions. Braylon Edwards became Michigan's career receptions leader with eight receptions and scored the game-winning touchdown on a seven-yard pass from Henne in the third quarter.

Statistics	SD	UM
First downs	15	20
Plays–yards	66–311	76–327
Rushes–yards	23–22	48–148
Passing yards	289	179
Passing: comp–att–int	27–43–1	14–28–3
Turnovers		
Time of possession	27:56	32:04

Team	Category	Player	Statistics
SDSU	Passing	Matt Dlugolecki	26/42 277 yds. 1 TD, 1 INT
SDSU	Rushing	Michael Franklin	16 carries, 39 yards, 1 TD
SDSU	Receiving	Robert Ortiz	7 receptions, 125 yards, 1 TD
Michigan	Passing	Chad Henne	11/24 162 yds., 2 TD, 3 INT
Michigan	Rushing	Mike Hart	25 carries, 121 yards
Michigan	Receiving	Braylon Edwards	8 receptions, 130 yards, 2 TD

=== Iowa ===
Iowa at Michigan

Team	1	2	3	4	Total
Iowa	7	0	3	7	17
• Michigan	0	16	7	7	30

- Date: September 25
- Location: Michigan Stadium
- Game start: 3:30 p.m. EST
- Game attendance: 111,428
- TV announcers (ABC): Brent Musburger (play-by-play), Gary Danielson (color)

Scoring summary
1	11:31	IOWA	Ed Hinkel 2-yard pass from Drew Tate (Kyle Schlicher kick)	IOWA 7–0
2	13:59	MICH	Garrett Rivas 46-yard field goal	IOWA 7–3
2	8:28	MICH	Braylon Edwards 58-yard pass from Chad Henne (Rivas kick)	MICH 10–7
2	6:21	MICH	Henne 1-yard run (kick failed)	MICH 16–7
2	7:32	MINN	Marion Barber III 19-yard run (Rhys Lloyd kick)	MICH 16–7
3	9:56	IOWA	Schlicher 25-yard field goal	MICH 16–10
4	0:09	MICH	Hart 7-yard run (Rivas kick)	MICH 23–10
4		MICH	Grant Mason 25-yard interception return	MICH 30–10

On September 25, No. 19 Michigan defeated Kirk Ferentz's Iowa Hawkeyes, 30–17, before a crowd of 111,428 at Michigan Stadium.

On offense, quarterback Chad Henne completed 16 of 26 passes for 236 yards, including a 58-yard touchdown pass to Braylon Edwards in the second quarter. Freshman tailback Mike Hart rushed for 99 yards and scored his first collegiate touchdown on a seven-yard run in the fourth quarter.

Michigan's defense held Iowa to -15 rushing yards and came up with five turnovers, three fumble recoveries and two interceptions off Iowa quarterback Drew Tate. Grant Mason registered one of the interceptions, returning it 25 yards for the Wolverines' final points of the game.

Statistics	IOWA	MICH
First downs	16	18
Plays–yards	60–255	65–329
Rushes–yards	28–-15	39–93
Passing yards	270	236
Passing: comp–att–int	24–32–2	16–26–0
Turnovers		
Time of possession	27:45	32:15

Team	Category	Player	Statistics
Iowa	Passing	Drew Tate	24/32 270 yds. 2 TD, 2 INT
Iowa	Rushing	Jermelle Lewis	14 carries, 35 yards
Iowa	Receiving	Ed Hinkel	7 receptions, 89 yards, 1 TD
Michigan	Passing	Chad Henne	16/26 236 yds., 1 TD
Michigan	Rushing	Mike Hart	26 carries, 99 yards, 1 TD
Michigan	Receiving	Braylon Edwards	6 receptions, 150 yards, 1 TD

=== Indiana ===
#19/18 Michigan at Indiana

Team	1	2	3	4	Total
• Michigan	7	7	21	0	35
Indiana	0	7	0	7	14

- Date: October 2
- Location: Memorial Stadium, Bloomington, IN
- Game start: 3:30 p.m. EST
- TV announcers (ABC): Jerry Punch (play-by-play), Gary Danielson (color), Jack Arute (sideline)
- Source: ESPN

Scoring summary
1	5:52	Michigan	Jermaine Gonzales 40-yard pass from Chad Henne (Garrett Rivas kick)	Michigan 7–0
2	4:37	Michigan	Leon Hall 76-yard punt return (Garrett Rivas kick)	Michigan 14–0
2	:06	Indiana	BenJarvus Green-Ellis 2-yard run (Bryan Robertson kick)	Michigan 14–7
3	12:40	Michigan	Mike Hart 1-yard run (Garrett Rivas kick)	Michigan 21–7
3	6:28	Michigan	Braylon Edwards 69-yard pass from Chad Henne (Garrett Rivas kick)	Michigan 28–7
3	2:07	Michigan	Braylon Edwards 38-yard pass from Chad Henne (Garrett Rivas kick)	Michigan 35–7
4	12:17	Indiana	Courtney Roby 6-yard pass from Matt LoVecchio (Bryan Robertson kick)	Michigan 35–14

On October 2, Michigan defeated Indiana, 35–14, at Bloomington, Indiana.

On the opening drive of the game, Indiana converted a fake punt for a long gain and drove to Michigan's 14-yard line. A high snap went through the hands of Indiana's quarterback for a 29-yard loss, ending the threat. On Michigan's first drive, Chad Henne threw a 40-yard touchdown pass to Jermaine Gonzales. Henne led Michigan's offense, completing 17 of 21 passes for 316 yards and three touchdowns, though he also fumbled twice. Braylon Edwards had eight catches for 165 yards, including touchdown receptions covering 69 and 38 yards. Freshman tailback Mike Hart started for the first time in his career, carrying the ball 20 times for 77 yards and a touchdown and also catching two passes for 36 yards. Edwards credited the success of the passing game to Indiana's defensive strategy: "They played eight in a box. They weren't doubling any of the receivers, so we knew if we could throw the ball up top it would be pretty much one-on-one and the receivers would have to make the play. And that's what we did"

Michigan also had big plays on special teams. Leon Hall returned a punt for 76 yards and a touchdown, and Grant Mason returned the second-half kickoff 97 yards to set up a short touchdown run by Mike Hart.

Michigan's defense limited Indiana to 214 yards of offense, including 64 rushing yards.

The game included three delays for instant replay as the Big Ten conducted an experiment with the technology during the 2004 season. In one instance, the game was delayed for 14 minutes while officials reviewed and ultimately overturned a kick-catch interference penalty against Indiana.

Statistics	UM	IU
First downs	21	13
Plays–yards	65–424	75–214
Rushes–yards	39–93	40–133
Passing yards	331	153
Passing: comp–att–int	19–26–0	14–22–0
Turnovers		
Time of possession	28:17	31:43

Team	Category	Player	Statistics
Michigan	Passing	Chad Henne	17/21 316 yds. 3 TD
Michigan	Rushing	Mike Hart	20 carries, 77 yards, 1 TD
Michigan	Receiving	Braylon Edwards	8 receptions, 165 yards, 2 TD
Indiana	Passing	Matt LoVecchio	13/19 139 yds. 1 TD
Indiana	Rushing	BenJarvus Green-Ellis	14 carries, 38 yards, 1 TD
Indiana	Receiving	Courtney Roby	5 receptions, 70 yards, 1 TD

=== Minnesota ===
#13 Minnesota at #14 Michigan
Little Brown Jug

Team	1	2	3	4	Total
Minnesota	7	7	7	3	24
• Michigan	10	7	0	10	27

- Date: October 9
- Location: Michigan Stadium, Ann Arbor, MI
- Game start: 12:00 p.m. EST
- Game attendance: 111,518
- TV announcers (ESPN): Mark Jones (play-by-play), Bob Davie (color), Holly Rowe (sideline)
- Source: ESPN

Scoring summary
1	9:39	MICH	Mike Hart 8-yard run (Garrett Rivas kick)	MICH 7–0
1	0:42	MICH	Garrett Rivas 38-yard field goal	MICH 10–0
1	0:30	MINN	Laurence Maroney 80-yard run (Rhys Lloyd kick)	MICH 10–7
2	10:34	MICH	Braylon Edwards 4-yard pass from Chad Henne (Garrett Rivas kick)	MICH 17–7
2	7:32	MINN	Marion Barber III 19-yard run (Rhys Lloyd kick)	MICH 17–14
3	8:33	MINN	Jared Ellerson 26-yard pass from Bryan Cupito (Rhys Lloyd kick)	MINN 21–17
4	13:14	MINN	Rhys Lloyd 27-yard field goal	MINN 24–17
4	9:36	MICH	Garrett Rivas 26-yard field goal	MINN 24–20
4	1:57	MICH	Tyler Ecker 31-yard pass from Chad Henne (Garrett Rivas kick)	MICH 27–24

On October 9, No. 14 Michigan defeated Glen Mason's No. 13 Minnesota Golden Gophers, 27–24, in the Little Brown Jug rivalry game before a crowd of 111,518 at Michigan Stadium.

Michigan tallied 518 yards of offense in the game, led by the freshmen Chad Henne (33 of 49 passing for 328 yards with two touchdowns and two interceptions) and Mike Hart (35 carries for 160 yards). Braylon Edwards had 10 receptions for 98 yards.

The defense gave up 345 yards, including an 80-yard touchdown run by Laurence Maroney at the end of the first quarter. Minnesota took a 21–17 lead in the third quarter on a 26-yard pass from Bryan Cupito to Jared Ellerson. Early in the fourth quarter, Leon Hall fumbled a punt, and Minnesota recovered the ball at Michigan's nine-yard line. The defense stiffened and allowed no gain on three plays, forcing the Golden Gophers to settle for a field goal and a 24–17 lead with 13:14 remaining in the game.

Henne led a comeback in the fourth quarter. Garrett Rivas kicked a 26-yard field goal with 9:36 remaining. On its next possession, Michigan drove to the Minnesota 39-yard line, but the drive stalled and Michigan punted with 5:05 remaining. The Wolverines got the ball back at their own 13-yard line with 3:04 remaining. Henne then led the team on a six-play, 87-yard, 67-second drive, including two passes to Jason Avant (for 20 and 17 yards) and culminating with a game-winning 31-yard touchdown pass to Tyler Ecker with 1:57 remaining.

Statistics	MINN	MICH
First downs	13	29
Plays–yards	61–345	94–518
Rushes–yards	39–189	45–190
Passing yards	156	328
Passing: comp–att–int	8–22–1	33–49–2
Turnovers		
Time of possession	27:56	32:04

Team	Category	Player	Statistics
Minnesota	Passing	Bryan Cupito	8/22 156 yds. 1 TD
Minnesota	Rushing	Laurence Maroney	19 carries, 145 yards, 1 TD
Minnesota	Receiving	Jared Ellerson	6 receptions, 83 yards, 1 TD
Michigan	Passing	Chad Henne	33/49 328 yds., 2 TD, 2 INT
Michigan	Rushing	Mike Hart	35 carries, 160 yards, 1 TD
Michigan	Receiving	Braylon Edwards	10 receptions, 98 yards, 1 TD

=== Illinois ===
#14 Michigan at Illinois

Team	1	2	3	4	Total
• Michigan	10	0	12	8	30
Illinois	0	17	0	2	19

- Date: October 16
- Location: Memorial Stadium, Champaign, ILL
- Game start: 12:00 p.m. EST
- Game attendance: 55,725

Scoring summary
1	13:30	MICH	Garrett Rivas 31-yard field goal	MICH 3–0
1	6:45	MICH	Max Martin 1-yard run (Garrett Rivas kick)	MICH 10–0
2	4:41	ILL	Pierre Thomas 2-yard pass from Jon Beutjer (Jason Reda kick)	MICH 10–7
2	3:54	ILL	Thomas 1-yard run (Reda kick)	ILL 14–10
2	0:05	ILL	Reda 40-yard field goal	ILL 17–10
3	7:49	MICH	Tyler Ecker 1-yard pass from Chad Henne (kick failed)	ILL 17–16
3	0:54	MICH	Henne 2-yard run (kick failed))	ILL MICH 22–17
4	8:54	MICH	Mike Hart 4-yard run (Jason Avant pass from Henne for two-point conversion)	MICH 30–17
4	0:03	ILL	Team safety	MICH 30–19

On October 16, Michigan defeated Ron Turner's Illinois Fighting Illini, 30–19, at Champaign, Illinois.

Michigan took a 10–0 lead in the first quarter. Chad Henne threw two interceptions in the second quarter, one of which was returned 62 yards by Justin Harrison. Illinois scored 17 unanswered points and led 17–10 at halftime. Early in the third quarter, Michigan linebacker Scott McClintock intercepted a Jon Beutjer pass, giving Michigan the ball at the Illinois six-yard line. Michigan scored three touchdowns in the second half and had a 96-yard, 16-play, six-minute drive at the start of the fourth quarter. Mike Hart set a Michigan freshman rushing record with 40 carries for 234 yards.

Defensively, the Wolverines held the Illini to 95 yards of total offense in the second half.

Statistics	UM	UI
First downs	23	19
Plays–yards	88–408	70–254
Rushes–yards	61–294	30–98
Passing yards	114	156
Passing: comp–att–int	14–27–2	20–40–3
Turnovers		
Time of possession	36:36	23:04

Team	Category	Player	Statistics
Michigan	Passing	Chad Henne	14/27 114 yds. 1 TD, 2 INT
Michigan	Rushing	Mike Hart	40 carries, 234 yards, 1 TD
Michigan	Receiving	Jason Avant	3 receptions, 48 yards
Indiana	Passing	Jon Beutjer	20/39 156 yds. 1 TD, 3 INT
Indiana	Rushing	Pierre Thomas	20 carries, 68 yards, 1 TD
Indiana	Receiving	Jason Davis	7 receptions, 69 yards

=== Purdue ===
Team	1	2	3	4	Total
• Michigan	7	3	3	3	16
Purdue	7	0	7	0	14

- Date: October 23
- Location: Ross–Ade Stadium
- Game start: 3:30 p.m. EST
- Game attendance: 65,170

Scoring summary
Q1	10:23	PUR	Jerod Void, 1-yard run (Ben Jones kick)	PUR 7–0
Q1	7:39	MICH	Mike Hart 25-yard pass from Chad Henne (Garrett Rivas kick)	TIE 7–7
Q2	8:56	MICH	Rivas 30-yard field goal	MICH 10–7
Q3	4:25	PUR	Brandon Jones 63-yard pass from Kyle Orton (Jones kick)	PUR 14–10
Q3	1:06	MICH	Rivas 25-yard field goal	PUR 14–13
Q4	3:36	MICH	Rivas 35-yard field goal	MICH 16–14

On October 23, No. 13 Michigan defeated No. 12 Purdue, 16–14, before a crowd of 65,179 at Ross–Ade Stadium in West Lafayette, Indiana.

The teams traded first-quarter touchdowns, Michigan scoring on a 25-yard pass from Chad Henne to Mike Hart. Purdue took the lead in the third quarter on a 64-yard pass from Kyle Orton to Brandon Jones. Michigan pulled ahead with three Garrett Rivas field-goals, the winning kick at 3:36 in the fourth quarter. Purdue's final drive ended with Ernest Shazor foorcing a fumble by Purdue receiver Dorien Bryant; Leon Hall recovered the loose ball with 2:03 remaining, and Michigan was able to run out the clock.

Mike Hart had 206 rushing yards on 33 carries. Chad Henne completed 22 of 39 passes for 190 yards with one touchdown and one interception. Purdue's offense averaged 485.3 yards per game in prior games and was held to 263 yards by Michigan. Michigan's defense sacked Purdue quarterback Kyle Orton three times, intercepted a pass, and limited him to 14-of-30 passing for 213 yards. Purdue's leading receiver Taylor Stubblefield was limited to one catch for 10 yards.

Statistics	UM	PU
First downs	22	13
Plays–yards	82–394	63–263
Rushes–yards	43–204	33–50
Passing yards	190	213
Passing: comp–att–int	22–39–1	14–30–1
Turnovers		
Time of possession	35:34	24:26

Team	Category	Player	Statistics
Michigan	Passing	Chad Henne	22/39 190 yds. 1 TD, 1 INT
Michigan	Rushing	Mike Hart	33 carries, 206 yards
Michigan	Receiving	Tim Massaquoi	5 receptions, 60 yards
Purdue	Passing	Kyle Orton	14/30 213 yds., 1 TD, 1 INT
Purdue	Rushing	Jerod Void	20 carries, 48 yards, 1 TD
Purdue	Receiving	Brandon Jones	4 receptions, 62 yards

=== Michigan State ===
Team	1	2	3	4	2OT	3OT	Total
Michigan State	14	3	0	10	7	0	34
• Michigan	7	3	0	17	7	8	42

- Date: October 30
- Location: Michigan Stadium
- Game start: 3:30 p.m. EST
- Game attendance: 111,609

Scoring summary
Q1	11:25	MSU	DeAndra Cobb 72-yard run (Dave Rayner kick)	MSU 7–0
Q1	7:50	MICH	Mike Hart 7-yard run (Garrett Rivas kick)	TIE 7–7
Q1	2:56	MSU	Drew Stanton 5-yard run (Rayner kick)	MSU 14–7
Q2	9:10	MSU	Rayner 22-yard field goal	MSU 17–7
Q2	0:49	MICH	Rivass 34-yard field goal	MSU 17–10
Q4	13:30	MSU	Rayner 19-yard field goal	MSU 20–10
Q4	8:43	MSU	Cobb 64-yard run (Rayner kick)	MICH 27–10
Q4	6:27	MICH	Rivas 24-yard field goal	MSU 27–13
Q4	6:12	MICH	Braylon Edwards 34-yard pass from Chad Henne (Rivas kick)	MSU 27–20
Q4	2:59	MICH	Edwards 21-yard pass from Henne (Rivas kick)	TIE 27–27
OT1		MICH	Rivas 34-yard field goal	MICH 30–27
OT1		MSU	Rayner 23-yard field goal	TIE 30–30
OT2		MSU	Jason Teague 3-yard run (Rayner kick)	MSU 37–30
OT2		MICH	Jason Avant 5-yard pass from Henne (Rivas kick)	TIE 37–37
OT3		MICH	Edwards 24-yard pass from Henne (Tim Massaquoi pass from Henne for two-point conversion)	MICH 45–37

On October 30, Michigan defeated John L. Smith's Michigan State Spartans, 45–37, in triple overtime before a crowd of 111,609 at Michigan Stadium.

The Spartans led, 27–10, midway through the fourth quarter. Michigan scored 17 points, including two touchdown receptions by Braylon Edwards, in the final 6:27 to tie the score. Michigan won the game in the third overtime period on a third touchdown pass from Henne to Edwards.

Edwards finished the game with 11 receptions for 189 yards and three touchdowns. Mike Hart carried 33 times for 224 yards to pass the 1,000-yard mark for the season. He became the first freshman in Michigan history to rush for 1,000 yards. Henne completed 24 of 35 passes for 273 yards and four touchdowns.

Statistics	MSU	MICH
First downs	25	27
Plays–yards	83–535	79–496
Rushes–yards	57–368	44–261
Passing yards	167	273
Passing: comp–att–int	18–26–0	24–35–0
Turnovers		
Time of possession	32:36	27:24

Team	Category	Player	Statistics
MSU	Passing	Drew Stanton	10/13, 95 yds.
MSU	Rushing	DeAndra' Cobb	22 carries, 205 yds., 2 TD
MSU	Receiving	Jason Randall	3 receptions, 42 yds.
Michigan	Passing	Chad Henne	24/35 273 yds., 4 TD
Michigan	Rushing	Mike Hart	33 carries, 224 yards, 1 TD
Michigan	Receiving	Braylon Edwards	11 receptions, 189 yards, 3 TD

=== Northwestern ===
Team	1	2	3	4	Total
Northwestern	3	3	7	7	20
• Michigan	0	7	21	14	42

- Date: November 13
- Location: Michigan Stadium
- Game start: 12:00 p.m. EST
- Elapsed time: 3:10
- Game attendance: 111,347
- Game weather: Sunny; Mid 40s; wind 5–10 N
- Referee: S. Pamon
- TV announcers (ABC): Brent Musburger and Gary Danielson

Scoring summary
Q1	5:34	NW	Howells 23 yard field goal	NW 3–0
Q2	13:24	MICH	Hart 34 yard run (Rivas kick)	MICH 7–3
Q2	:22	NW	Howells 32 yard field goal	MICH 7–6
Q3	11:17	MICH	Hart 4 yard run (Rivas kick)	MICH 14–6
Q3	10:59	NW	Herron 68 yard run (Howells kick)	MICH 14–13
Q3	6:48	MICH	Avant 14 yard pass from Henne (Rivas kick)	MICH 21–13
Q3	4:13	MICH	Hart 15 yard run (Rivas kick)	MICH 28–13
Q4	9:49	MICH	Breaston 10 yard pass from Henne (Rivas kick)	MICH 35–13
Q4	9:14	MICH	Breston 67 yard punt return (Rivas kick)	MICH 42–13
Q4	4:48	NW	Horn 9 yard pass from Basanez (Howells kick)	MICH 42–20

On November 13, and following a bye week, Michigan defeated Randy Walker's Northwestern Wildcats, 42–20, before a crowd of 111,347 in Ann Arbor. It was the last game at Michigan Stadium for 15 Michigan seniors, including Braylon Edwards, Ernest Shazor, and Marlin Jackson.

Michigan's offense tallied only seven points in the first half, but broke the game open with 35 points in the second half. Mike Hart carried the ball 23 times for 151 rushing yards and three touchdowns. Hart became the first Michigan player to register four consecutive games with over 150 rushing yards. After the game, Bob Wojnowski of The Detroit News called Hart "a freak" and "the most intriguing young player we've seen in years." Henne completed 19 of 26 passes for 187 yards and two touchdowns, and Braylon Edwards passed the 1,000-yard mark to become the first receiver in Big Ten history to have three consecutive seasons with at least 1,000 receiving yards.

During the off-season, sophomore Steve Breaston had surgery to repair a stress fracture in his right foot. Hampered earlier in the season, Breaston had a breakout game against Northwestern with 272 all-purpose yards: five receptions for 49 yards and a touchdown; two rushing attempts for 32 yards; four punt returns for 112 yards (including a 69-yard return for a touchdown); and three kickoff returns for 79 yards.

The combination of Michigan's victory and Wisconsin's loss to Michigan State guaranteed the Wolverines a share of the Big Ten championship. It was Michigan's 15th consecutive victory at home and its 13th consecutive victory against Big Ten opponents.

Statistics	NW	UM
First downs	21	24
Plays–yards	78–405	68–421
Rushes–yards	34–190	39–231
Passing yards	215	190
Passing: comp–att–int	24–44–0	20–29–0
Turnovers		
Time of possession	29:42	30:18

Team	Category	Player	Statistics
Northwestern	Passing	Brett Basanez	23/43 211 yds. 1 TD
Northwestern	Rushing	Noah Herron	23 carries, 156 yards, 1 TD
Northwestern	Receiving	Kim Thompson	4 receptions, 46 yards, 1 TD
Michigan	Passing	Chad Henne	19/26 187 yds., 2 TD
Michigan	Rushing	Mike Hart	23 carries, 151 yards, 3 TD
Michigan	Receiving	Braylon Edwards	7 receptions, 54 yards

=== Ohio State ===
Team	1	2	3	4	Total
Michigan	14	0	0	7	21
• Ohio State	7	13	14	3	37

- Date: November 20
- Location: Ohio Stadium
- Game start: 1:00 p.m. EST
- Game attendance: 105,456

Scoring summary
Q1	13:47	OHIO	Anthony Gonzalez 68-yard pass from Troy Smith (Mike Nugent kick)	OHIO 7–0
Q1	10:25	MICH	Jason Avant 4-yard pass from Chad Henne (Garrett Rivas kick)	TIE 7–7
Q1	6:03	MICH	Mike Hart 1-yard run (Rivas kick)	MICH 14–7
Q2	13:16	OHIO	Smith 1-yard run (Nugent kick)	TIE 14–14
Q2	2:16	OHIO	Nugent 21-yard field goal	OHIO 17–14
Q2	0:00	OHIO	Nugent 42-yard field goal	OHIO 20–14
Q3	9:56	OHIO	Ted Ginn 82-yard punt return (Nugent kick)	OHIO 27–14
Q3	1:53	OHIO	Santonio Holmes 12-yard pass fromm Smith (Nugent kick)	OHIO 34–14
Q4	10:56	MICH	Braylon Edwards 38-yard pass from Henne ((Rivas kick)	OHIO 34–21
Q4	7:15	OHIO	Nugent 48-yard field goal	OHIO 37–21

   [33]

On November 20, No. 7 Michigan lost to Jim Tressel's unranked Ohio State Buckeyes, 37–21, before a crowd of 105,456 at Ohio Stadium in Columbus, Ohio.

Michigan scored touchdowns on its first two drives to take a 14–7 lead in the first quarter. Ohio State then scored 27 unanswered points. After the first quarter, Ohio State stacked the line to stop Michigan's running game. Mike Hart was averaging 131 yard per game but was limited to 61 yards on 18 carries (27 yards on 12 carries after the first quarter).

Prior to the game, Ohio State ranked No. 108 in offense. Against Michigan, the Buckeyes scored a season-high 37 points and had drives of 99 and 97 yards. Sophomore quarterback Troy Smith accounted for 386 of Ohio State's 446 yards (241 passing yards, 145 rushing yards) and three touchdowns (two passing and one rushing). Ted Ginn Jr. also starred with five receptions for 87 yards and an 82-yard punt return for touchdown in the third quarter.

Despite the loss, Michigan tied with Iowa for the Big Ten championship and received the conference's Rose Bowl berth, having defeated the Hawkeyes earlier in the season.

Statistics	UM	OSU
First downs	20	18
Plays–yards	76–399	70–446
Rushes–yards	22–71	47–205
Passing yards	328	241
Passing: comp–att–int	27–54–2	13–23–0
Turnovers		
Time of possession	25:44	34:16

Team	Category	Player	Statistics
Michigan	Passing	Chad Henne	27/54 328 yds. 2 TD, 2 INT
Michigan	Rushing	Mike Hart	18 carries, 61 yards, 1 TD
Michigan	Receiving	Braylon Edwards	11 receptions, 172 yards 1 TD
Ohio St.	Passing	Troy Smith	13/23 241 yds., 2 TD
Ohio St.	Rushing	Troy Smith	18 carries 145 yds, 1 TD
Ohio St.	Receiving	Ted Ginn Jr.	5 receptions, 87 yds

=== Rose Bowl ===
Texas vs. Michigan

Team	1	2	3	4	Total
• Texas	7	7	7	17	38
Michigan	0	14	17	6	37

- Date: January 1, 2005
- Location: Rose Bowl, Pasadena, CA
- Game start: 5:00 p.m. EST
- Game attendance: 93,468
- TV announcers (ABC): Keith Jackson (play-by-play), Dan Fouts (analyst), Todd Harris (sideline)

Scoring summary
1	1:41	TEX	Vince Young, 20-yard run (Dusty Mangum kick)	TEX 7–0
2	12:08	MICH	Braylon Edwards 39-yard pass from Chad Henne (Garrett Rivas kick)	TIE 7–7
2	4:16	TEX	David Thomas 11-yard pass from Vince Young (Dusty Mangum kick)	TEX 14–7
2	0:20	MICH	Braylon Edwards 8-yard pass from Chad Henne (Garrett Rivas kick)	TIE 14–14
3	12:53	TEX	Vince Young, 60-yard run (Dusty Mangum kick)	TEX 21–14
3	12:23	MICH	Steve Breaston 50-yard pass from Chad Henne (Garrett Rivas kick)	TIE 21–21
3	4:21	MICH	Braylon Edwards, 9-yard pass from Chad Henne (Garrett Rivas kick)	MICH 28–21
3	2:35	MICH	Rivas 44-yard field goal	MICH 31–21
4	9:51	TEX	Young 10-yard run (Mangum kick)	MICH 31–28
4	6:09	MICH	Rivas 32-yard field goal	MICH 34–28
4	4:56	TEX	Young, 23-yard run (Mangum kick)	TEX 35–34
4	3:04	MICH	Rivas 42-yard field goal	MICH 37–35
4	0:00	TEX	Mangum 37-yard field goal;	TEX 38–37

On January 1, 2005, Michigan lost to No. 6 Texas, 38–37, in the 2005 Rose Bowl game before a crowd of 93,468 in Pasadena, California.

== Roster ==
2004 Michigan Wolverines football team roster
Players
Coaches
Offense

Pos.	#	Name	Class
WR	1	Braylon Edwards	Sr
RB	5	Dave Underwood	Sr
QB	7	Spencer Brinton	Sr
QB	7	Chad Henne	Fr
WR	8	Jason Avant	Jr
QB	8	Matt Wilde	Jr
QB	10	Clayton Richard	So
WR	12	Landon Smith	So
QB	12	Matt Gutierrez	Jr
QB	13	Jeff Kastl	Sr
WR	14	Morgan Trent	Fr
WR	15	Steve Breaston	So
WR	15	Braylon Edwards	Sr
WR	16	Adrian Arrington	Fr
WR	17	Carl Tabb	Jr
WR	18	Germaine Gonzales	Sr
RB	20	Mike Hart	Fr
RB	23	Max Martin	Fr
RB	24	Jerome Jackson	So
RB	27	Pierre Rembert	Jr
FB	32	Kevin Dudley	Sr
RB	33	Scott Hamel	Jr
FB	35	Brian Thompson	Jr
FB	40	Obianna Oluigbo	Jr
RB	41	Tim Bracken	Sr
FB	43	Roger Allison	Fr
RB	44	Jason Eldridge	Jr
WR	45	Brad Cischke	Jr
OL	54	Mark Bihl	Jr
OL	57	Adam Kraus	So
OL	61	Turner Booth	Jr
OL	62	Jon Saigh	Fr
OL	63	Derek Bell	Sr
OL	64	Grant DeBeneictis	Fr
OL	65	Leo Henige	Sr
OL	67	Matt Lentz	Sr
OL	72	Rueben Riley	Jr
OL	75	David Baas	Sr
OL	76	Mike Kolodziej	Jr
OL	77	Jake Long	So
OL	79	Adam Stenavich	Sr
TE	88	Tim Massaquoi	Sr
TE	89	Tyler Ecker	Jr

Defense

Pos.	#	Name	Class
OLB	2	Shawn Crable	So
CB	3	Marlin Jackson	Sr
CB	4	Darnell Hood	Jr
ILB	6	Prescott Burgess	So
S	9	Anton Campbell	So
CB	13	Grant Mason	Sr
ILB	15	Chip Cartwright	Jr
S	19	Willis Barringer	Jr
S	22	Jamar Adams	Fr
CB	22	Kyle Plummer	So
S	25	Ernest Shazor	Sr
S	26	Mike Carl	Jr
S	26	Ryan Mundy	So
S	28	Jacob Stewart	Jr
CB	29	Leon Hall	So
CB	39	Markus Curry	Sr
S	31	Brandent Englemon	So
ILB	34	Joe Leoni	Jr
LB	36	Scott McClintock	Jr
ILB	37	Chris Graham	Fr
S	38	B.J. Opong-Owusu	Jr
ILB	42	Lawrence Reid	Sr
ILB	45	David Harris	Jr
DE	50	Jeremy Van Alstyne	Jr
OLB	56	LaMarr Woodley	So
OLB	58	Roy Manning	Sr
DL	78	Gabe Watson	Jr
OLB	90	Tim Jamison	Fr
DE	91	Rondell Biggs	Jr
DT	93	Alex Ofili	Sr
DE	94	Pat Massey	Sr
DE	96	Larry Harrison	Jr
OLB	99	Pierre Woods	Sr

Special teams

Pos.	#	Name	Class
P	2	Mark Spencer	Jr
P	3	Ross Ryan	So
PK	10	Troy Nienberg	Sr
PK	31	Craig Moore	Jr
K	34	Jason Gingell	Fr
PK	38	Garrett Rivas	Fr
P	39	Adam Finley	Sr

Head coach

- Lloyd Carr

Coordinators/assistant coaches

- Terry Malone (offensive coordinator, offensive line)
- Jim Herrmann (defensive coordinator)
- Erik Campbell (assistant head coach)
- Mike DeBord (ST/RC)
- Ron English (defensive backs)
- Fred Jackson (associate head coach, running backs)
- Scot Loeffler (quarterbacks)
- Andy Moeller (offensive line)
- Bill Sheridan (linebackers, defensive line)

Legend

- (C) Team captain
- (S) Suspended
- (I) Ineligible
- Injured
- Redshirt

Roster
Last update: November 12, 2023

== Awards and achievements ==
=== Braylon Edwards ===
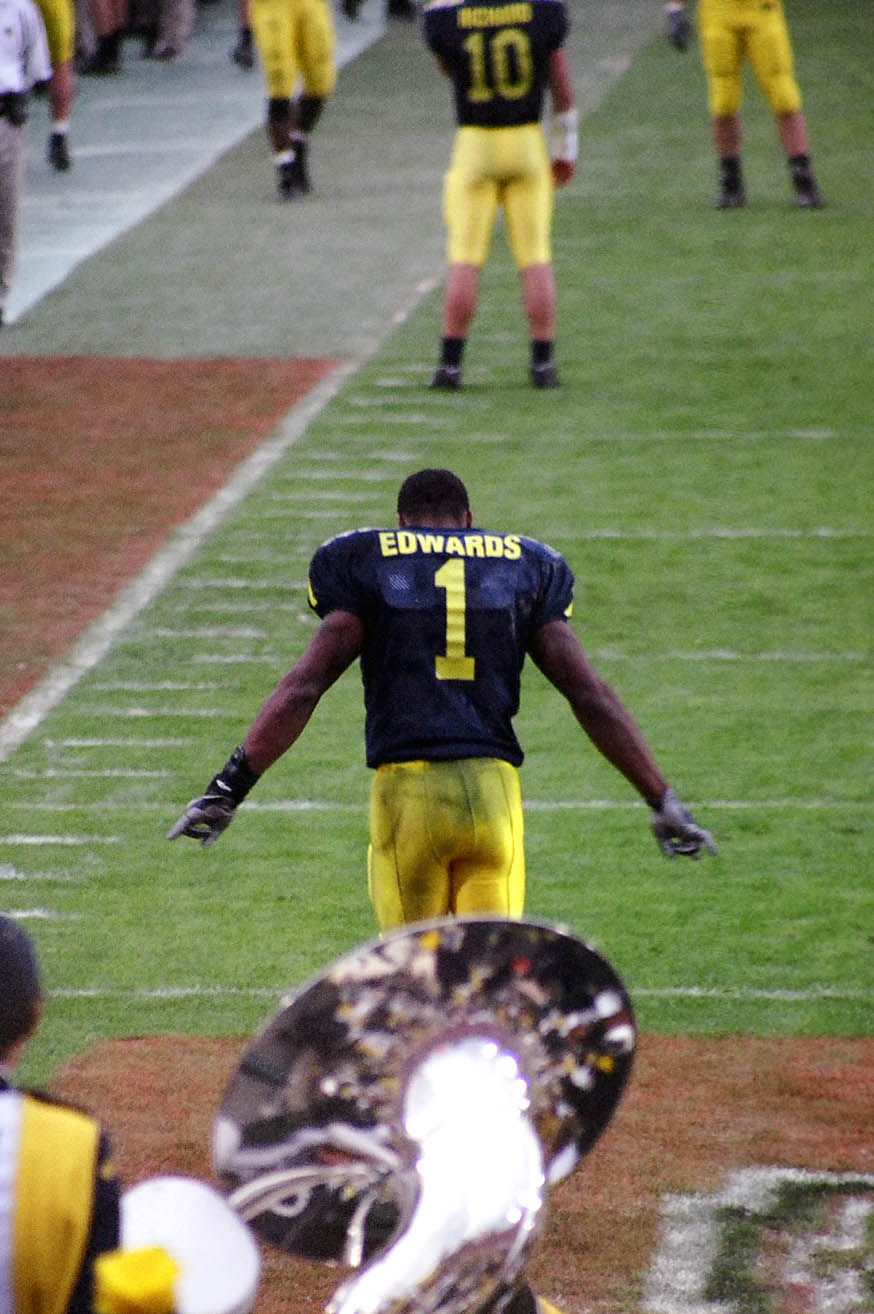
Braylon Edwards caught three touchdown receptions at the 2005 Rose Bowl.

Wide receiver Braylon Edwards set Michigan single-season records with 97 receptions and 1,303 receiving yards. He led the Big Ten with 8.1 receptions per game and 110.8 receiving yards per game (all games). His career total of 39 receiving touchdowns broke Anthony Carter's conference record. Edwards also became the first Big Ten player to register three consecutive seasons with over 1,000 receiving yards.

At the end of the season, Edwards received multiple honors, including the following:

- Biletnikoff Award - Edwards won the Biletnikoff Award as the best wide receiver in college football. He was the first Michigan player to receive the award.
- Paul Warfield Trophy - Edwards also received the Warfield Trophy as the nation's top collegiate receiver.
- Chicago Tribune Silver Football - Edwards also won the Chicago Tribune Silver Football as the most valuable player in the Big Ten Conference.
- 2004 All-America college football team - Edwards was a unanimous All-American, receiving first-team honors from the Associated Press (AP), American Football Coaches Association (AFCA), Football Writers Association of America (FWAA), The Sporting News (SN), the Walter Camp Football Foundation (WCFF), Sports Illustrated (SI), Pro Football Weekly (PFW), ESPN, CBS, College Football News (CFN), and Rivals.
- Michigan MVP award - Edwards was voted by his teammates as the most valuable player on the 2004 Michigan team.
- 2004 All-Big Ten Conference football team - Edwards was picked as a first-team All-Big Ten receiver by both the media and coaches.

Edwards also finished tenth in the voting for the Heisman Trophy.

=== David Baas ===
Fifth-year senior David Baas started 30 straight games at left guard for Michigan. Against Iowa in the Big Ten opener, he moved to center. At the time of the shift, Baas said the move was a surprise but added: "Whatever the team needs that's what I'm going to do. If they want to continue to play me at center, I'm going to do that." In his first year playing the center position, Baas won multiple post-season honors, including the following:

- Rimington Trophy - Baas received the Rimington Trophy as the best center in college football. He was the first Michigan player to receive the award. (David Molk and Olusegun Oluwatimi later won the award.)
- All-America team - Baas received first team All-America honors from the AP, FWAA, WCFF, and CBS.
- All-Big Ten team - Baas was selected as a first-team All-Big Ten player by the conference coaches. (Greg Eslinger of Minnesota won the honor from the media.)
- Big Ten Offensive Lineman of the Year - Baas also won the award as the Big Ten offensive lineman of the year.
- Hugh Rader Jr. Award - Baas also won Michigan's Hugh Rader Jr. Award.

=== Mike Hart ===
Despite starting the season as a backup, freshman tailback Mike Hart led the Big Ten with 1,455 rushing yards and was named Big Ten Freshman of the Year. He also set a school record with three 200-yard games in a season, surpassing five predecessors with two each. At the end of the season, Hart won the award as the Big Ten Freshman of the Year. He also won first-team honors from both the coaches and media on the 2004 All-Big Ten Conference football team.

=== Others ===
Freshman quarterback Chad Henne tallied 2,743 passing yards and tied Elvis Grbac's 1991 single-season record of 25 touchdown passes.

Michigan players to receive All-American and all-conference honors were:

- All-Americans: Baas, Edwards, Marlin Jackson, Ernest Shazor
- Academic All-American: Adam Finley (second team)
- All-Big Ten: Baas, Braylon Edwards, Mike Hart, Matt Lentz, Adam Stenavich, Tim Massaquoi, Gabe Watson, Marlin Jackson, Ernest Shazor

=== Team awards ===
- Captains: David Baas, Marlin Jackson
- Most Valuable Player: Braylon Edwards
- Meyer Morton Award: Braylon Edwards
- John Maulbetsch Award: Jake Long
- Frederick Matthei Award: Jason Avant
- Dick Katcher Award: LaMarr Woodley
- Arthur Robinson Scholarship Award: Adam Finley; Matt Studenski
- Hugh Rader Jr. Award: David Baas
- Robert P. Ufer Award: Kevin Dudley
- Roger Zatkoff Award: Roy Manning

== Statistics ==
=== Passing ===
Player	Att	Comp	Int	Comp %	Yds	Yds/Comp	TD
Chad Henne	399	240	12	60.2	2743	6.9	25
Clayton Richard	15	8	0	53.3	52	3.5	0

=== Rushing ===
Player	Att	Net Yards	Yds/Att	TD
Mike Hart	282	1455	5.2	9
Max Martin	32	132	4.1	1
David Underwood	29	129	4l4	2
Jerome Jackson	32	90	2.8	1
Steve Breaston	10	76	7.6	0
Braylon Edwards	6	61	10.2	0
Pierre Rembert	8	46	5.8	0

=== Receiving ===
Player	Recp	Yds	Yds/Recp	TD
Braylon Edwards	97	1330	13.7	15
Jason Avant	38	447	11.8	3
Steve Breaston	34	291	8.6	3
Mike Hart	26	237	9.1	1
Tim Massaquoi	18	184	10.2	0
Tyler Ecker	17	157	9.2	2
Germaine Gonzales	7	94	13.4	1

=== Scoring ===
Player	Points
Garrett Rivas	94 (37 extra points, 19 field goals)
Braylon Edwards	90 (15 TD)
Mike Hart	60 (10 TD)
Steve Breaston	24 (4 TD)
Chad Henne	18 (3 TD)
Jason Avant	18 (3 TD)
