= Tim Massaquoi =

American football player (born 1982)

No. 89, 49
- Position: Tight end

Personal information
- Born: July 8, 1982 (age 44); New York City, U.S.
- Listed height: 6 ft 3 in (1.91 m)
- Listed weight: 255 lb (116 kg)

Career information
- High school: Parkland (South Whitehall Township, Pennsylvania)
- College: Michigan
- NFL draft: 2006: 7th round, 244th overall pick

Career history
- Tampa Bay Buccaneers (2006)*; Miami Dolphins (2006); Buffalo Bills (2007)
- * Offseason or practice squad member only

Awards and highlights
- First-team All-Big Ten (2004); Second-team All-Big Ten (2005)
- Stats at Pro Football Reference

Arnold Timothy Massaquoi (born July 8, 1982) is an American former professional football player who was a tight end in the National Football League (NFL). He was selected by the Tampa Bay Buccaneers in the seventh round of the 2006 NFL draft. He played college football for the Michigan Wolverines. He is the cousin of former Cleveland Browns wide receiver Mohamed Massaquoi.

== Early life ==
Massaquoi was a three-year starter and letterman on the varsity team at Parkland High School in South Whitehall Township, Pennsylvania, where he played in the highly competitive Eastern Pennsylvania Conference. He caught 21 passes for 354 yards and 11 touchdowns in his junior year, earning all-state and all-conference honors. As a senior, he made 50 receptions for 750 yards and nine touchdowns, and also recorded 65 tackles and three interceptions as a safety and linebacker. His performance as a senior earned him Pennsylvania All-Area, All-Conference and Associated Press All-State honors.

For his career, he caught 114 passes for 1,928 yards and 22 touchdowns in career, while also rushing seven times for 21 yards. He recorded 131 tackles, five sacks and caused and recovered three fumbles. He also intercepted seven passes, returning one for a touchdown.

== College career ==
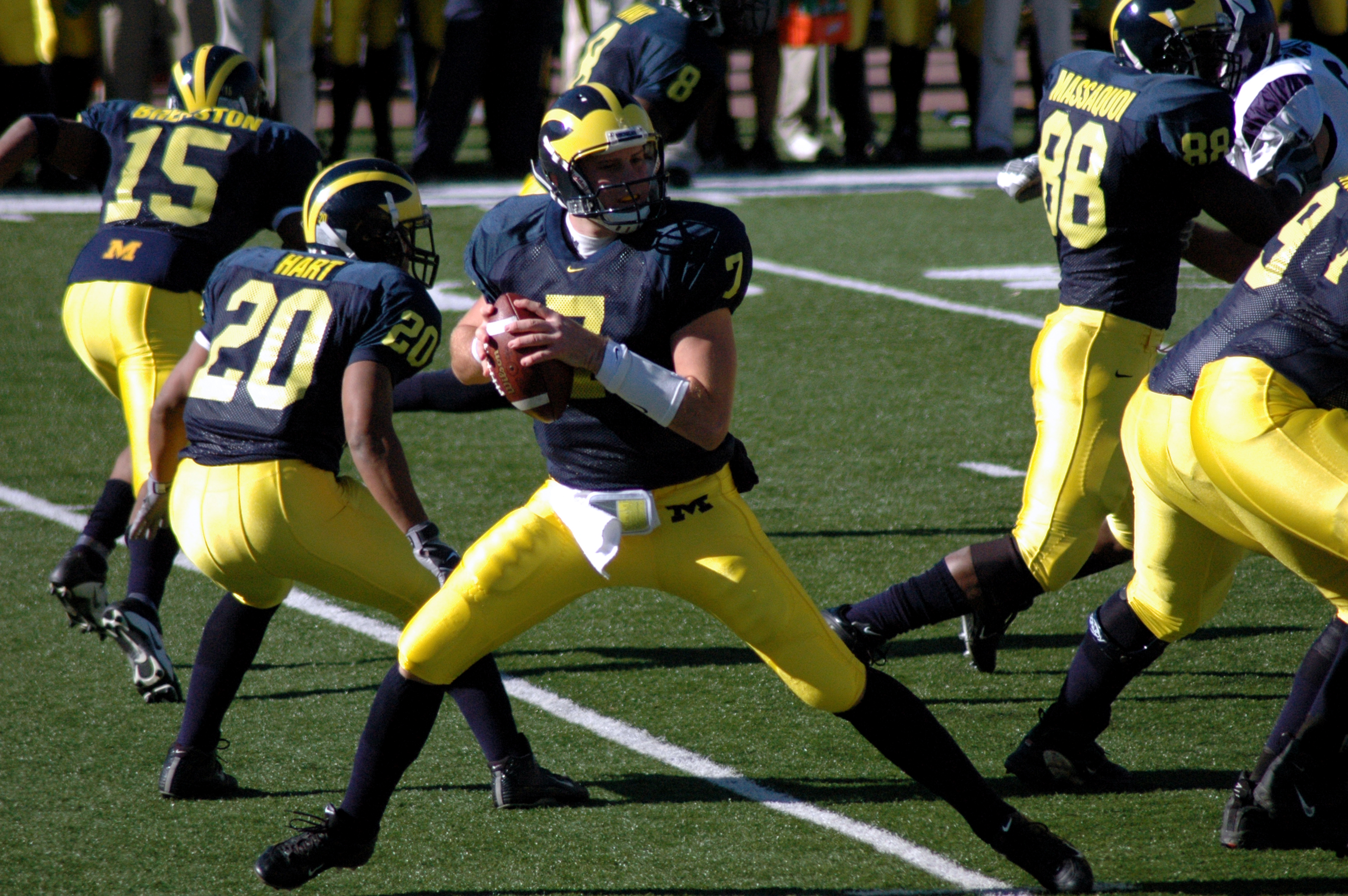
2004 Michigan Wolverines football team: #20 Mike Hart, #7 Chad Henne, #15 Steve Breaston, #8 Jason Avant, and #88 Massaquoi

Massaquoi was a four-year letterman and two-year starter for the Michigan Wolverines and a two-time All-Big Ten Conference selection. He appeared in 47 career games, making 29 starts at tight end. He appeared in one game in 2001 before undergoing season-ending surgery.

=== 2002 ===
Massaquoi saw action in all 13 games on special teams or at tight end in 2003. He made first career reception and played on special teams against Western Michigan on September 7. He made first career start at tight end and tallied one special teams stop at Minnesota on November 9. He saw action at both tight end and on special teams against Florida in the Outback Bowl on January 1, 2003.

=== 2003 ===
In 2003, Massaquoi played in all 13 games and started eight contests. He led all Michigan tight ends with 15 receptions for 199 yards and caught two touchdowns. He made a career-long 45-yard reception against Houston on September 6. Against Minnesota, he recovered a fumble on game-winning drive. His first career touchdown pass came against Illinois on October 18 - a 21-yard scoring play from Matt Gutierrez. He also caught a career-best three passes for 37 yards against the Illini. Massaquoi started at tight end against Southern California in the Rose Bowl on January 1, 2004, catching a five-yard touchdown pass from John Navarre.

=== 2004 ===
For his efforts in 2004, Massaquoi earned first-team All-Big Ten honors. He started 11 of 12 games at tight end, finishing fifth on the team in receptions (18) and receiving yards (184). He made at least one catch in nine of the 12 contests. He caught a two-point conversion pass in triple overtime vs. Michigan State on October 30. On October 9 against Minnesota, he caught a then career-best four passes for 31 yards. He would beat his own mark not long after with five catches for 60 yards at Purdue on October 23. In the Rose Bowl against Texas on January 1, 2005, he caught two passes for 19 yards.

=== 2005 ===
As a fifth-year senior in 2005, Massaquoi was recipient of the "Robert P. Ufer Bequest" as the top senior player who demonstrates enthusiasm and love for Michigan. For his performance during the season when he started nine games, he was an All-Big Ten second-team selection. On the year, he caught 11 passes for 86 yards (7.8 avg.). He missed multiple games, including the Alamo Bowl against Nebraska on December 28, due to injury.

Massaquoi finished his career with two All-Big Ten Team selections and 46 passes for 489 yards (10.6 avg.) and two touchdowns.

== Professional career ==
Pre-draft measurables
Height	Weight	Arm length	Hand span	40-yard dash	20-yard shuttle	Three-cone drill	Vertical jump	Broad jump	Bench press
6 ft 2 5/8 in (1.90 m)	259 lb (117 kg)	32 1/4 in (0.82 m)	9 3/8 in (0.24 m)	4.85 s	4.34 s	6.92 s	29.0 in (0.74 m)	9 ft 2 in (2.79 m)	32 reps
All values from NFL Combine/Pro Day

=== 2006 ===
Massaquoi was originally a seventh-round pick (244th overall) by the Tampa Bay Buccaneers in the 2006 NFL draft. He was waived in September following training camp and awarded off waivers to the Miami Dolphins. After being inactive for the season opener against the Pittsburgh Steelers, he was released and re-signed to the team's practice squad. He remained there until October 11 when he was signed to the active roster. He made his NFL debut a day later against the Kansas City Chiefs. In all, he was active for seven games for the Dolphins in 2006, but did not accumulate any statistics.

=== 2007 ===
On September 1, Massaquoi was released unconditionally from the Dolphins. He was signed by the Buffalo Bills on November 14, who then released him on August 30, 2008.
