= Steve Weatherford =

American football player (born 1982)

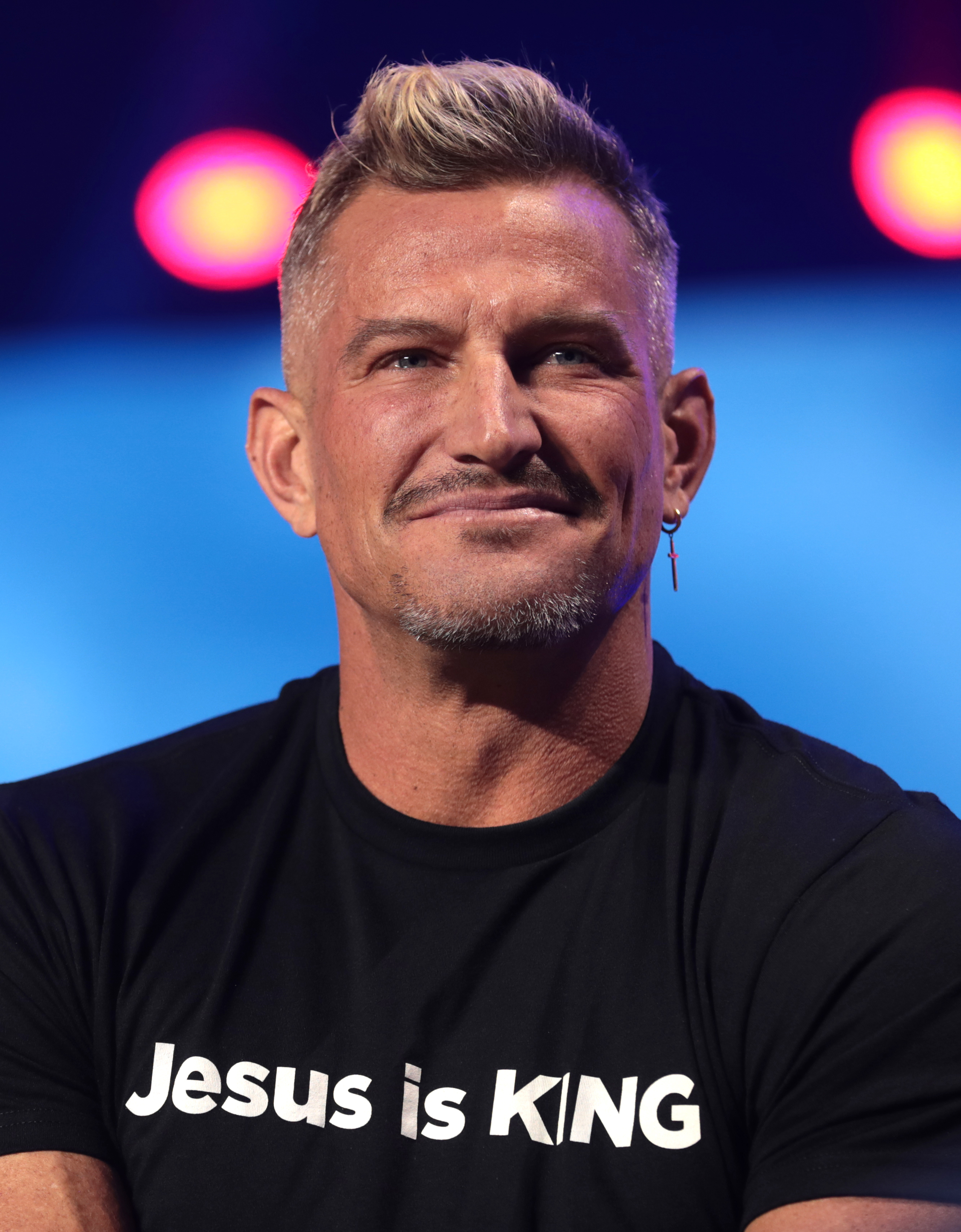
- Weatherford in 2021

No. 7, 6, 9, 5, 3
- Position: Punter

Personal information
- Born: December 17, 1982 (age 43); Crown Point, Indiana, U.S.
- Listed height: 6 ft 2 in (1.88 m)
- Listed weight: 210 lb (95 kg)

Career information
- High school: North Vigo (Terre Haute, Indiana)
- College: Illinois (2001–2005)
- NFL draft: 2006: undrafted

Career history
- New Orleans Saints (2006−2008); Kansas City Chiefs (2008); Jacksonville Jaguars (2008); New York Jets (2009−2010); New York Giants (2011−2014); New York Jets (2015)

Awards and highlights
- Super Bowl champion (XLVI); First-team All-Big Ten (2004); Second-team All-Big Ten (2005)

Career NFL statistics
- Punts: 678
- Punt yards: 30,159
- Punting yard average: 44.5
- Longest punt: 71
- Inside 20: 211
- Stats at Pro Football Reference

Steven Thomas Weatherford (born December 17, 1982) is an American former professional football player who was a punter in the National Football League (NFL). He played college football for the Illinois Fighting Illini and was signed by the New Orleans Saints as an undrafted free agent in 2006. Weatherford was also a member of the New Orleans Saints, Kansas City Chiefs, Jacksonville Jaguars, New York Jets, and New York Giants. He won Super Bowl XLVI as a member of the Giants.

== Early life ==
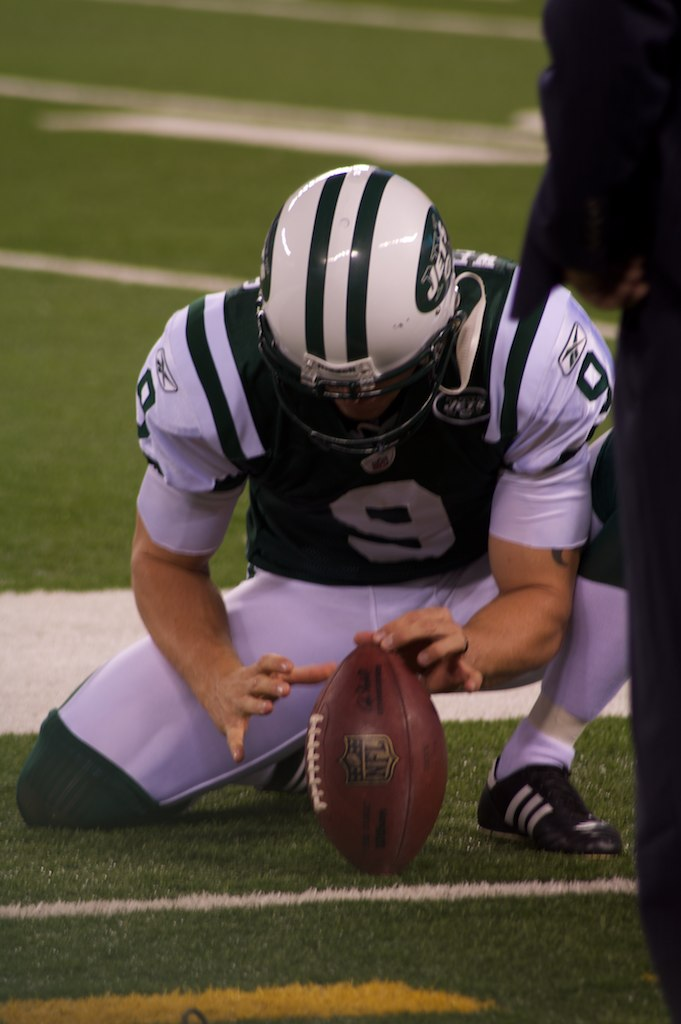
Weatherford with the Jets, 2010

Weatherford attended Terre Haute North Vigo High School in Terre Haute, Indiana, where he played football, soccer, track and basketball, earning a total of thirteen varsity letters. He played football as a punter, kicker and safety. As a punter and place kicker, he set records for the most field goals in a career, longest punting average and longest field goal made (55 yards vs. Lawrence North High School). He averaged 45.4 yards per punt and held a 4.26 second hangtime average. As a kicker, Weatherford made 37 of 40 extra point attempts and connected on seven field goals from 40 yards or longer. He was named to the All-Conference team and earned All-State honors as a kicker twice consecutively. As a safety, Weatherford managed two interceptions, one of which was returned for a touchdown. He was an All-County forward in soccer.

Also a standout track and field athlete, Weatherford was a three-time All-State and All-conference selection for the 300-meter hurdles. He set a Junior Olympics record in the 4 × 800 m relay. He was also a finalist in the pentathlon at the Junior Olympics and owns the school record for the 300-meter hurdles with a time of 39.01 seconds.

== College career ==
Entering the University of Illinois at Urbana-Champaign in 2001, Weatherford redshirted his freshman year. He was named the starter in 2002, averaging 39.7 yards on 23 punts. He was also a member of the men's track team.

In 2003, Weatherford was an Honorable Mention All-Big Ten Conference selection. Weatherford averaged 44.5 yards on 43 punts, breaking the school record held by Dike Eddleman since 1948 (43.0 yards per punt). This placed Weatherford at second in the Big Ten and 12th in the nation in punting average. He was also named the school's Special Teams player of the Year. In track and field, Weatherford was one of the Illini's most versatile athletes, competing in the long jump, high jump, 60m hurdles, shot put and heptathlon. He placed sixth in the heptathlon at the Big Ten Championships with 4,956 points, which is good for second on the Illini's career list in the event. He finished fifth in the long jump at the Illinois Invitational. He had a season-best high jump of 1.95 meters (6'04.75") at the Carle/Health Alliance Classic.

In 2004, Weatherford earned First-team All-Big Ten honors from the Coaches and Second-team honors from the media. Sports Illustrated named him the Most Underrated Player in the Big Ten. He finished second in the Big Ten in punting average, again, and fourth nationally. Weatherford averaged 45.4 yards per punt on 57 attempts, breaking the record he set the previous season. He was a semifinalist for the Ray Guy Award. He also scored a touchdown on a fake field goal against Northwestern on November 20, 2004. In track and field, Weatherford placed sixth in the decathlon at the Drake Relays with 6,242 points. He took fourth in the long jump at the TSU Relays with a career-best leap of 6.85 meters (22'5.75"). He posted the second highest heptathlon score in school history with 5,181 points to finish fifth at the Big Ten Championships. He had season-best efforts in the 60 meters (7.32s) and the 60m hurdles (8.38s) at the EIU Friday Night Special. He finished fifth in the high jump at the Carle/Health Alliance Invitational with a leap of 1.97 meters (6'05.50"). He was fifth in the long jump at the Illinois Invitational with an effort of 6.70 meters (21'11.75").

In his senior season in 2005, Weatherford punted 64 times for a per punt average of 42.8 yards. Weatherford finished his collegiate career as the school's all-time leader in career punting average, with a career average of 43.6 yards per punt. In track and field, he placed 3rd in the heptathlon at the 2005 Big Ten Indoor T&F Championships, setting a school record with 5,365 points.

== Professional career ==
=== New Orleans Saints ===
Weatherford was signed as an undrafted free agent on April 20, 2006, by New Orleans. Weatherford was released by New Orleans on September 2 only to be re-signed on September 5, 2006.

Weatherford played in all 16 games for the New Orleans Saints, punting 77 times for an average of 43.8 yards per punt, which ranked 15th in the NFL. He had a season-long of 59 yards, and 19 of his punts were inside the 20-yard line. Weatherford also recorded two solo tackles and a 15-yard rush for a first down.

On October 20, 2008, he was released by the Saints.

=== Kansas City Chiefs ===
Weatherford was claimed off waivers by the Kansas City Chiefs on October 22, 2008. The Chiefs then put him on waivers on November 4.

=== Jacksonville Jaguars ===
Weatherford was signed by the Jacksonville Jaguars on November 25 after Adam Podlesh went on injured reserve. He competed with Podlesh for a spot on the Jaguars' roster for 2009 but was eventually cut by the team on September 5, 2009.

=== New York Jets (first stint) ===
Weatherford was signed by the New York Jets on September 7, 2009, and was the team's punter for the 2009 season. However, he was unable to play in the Jets' first playoff game due to problems with an irregular heartbeat. After the game, Weatherford explained that he had undergone surgery during college to correct a genetic heart condition that caused his heart to race, and that during his professional career the problem had not recurred until this game. Weatherford said he was taking medication to control the condition, was cleared to play in the Jets' next game, and would have minor heart surgery to address the problem after the season. In March 2010 Weatherford underwent cardiac ablation at Morristown Memorial Hospital in Morristown, New Jersey.

During the 2010 season, Weatherford tied the record for most punts inside the 20-yard line in a single season with 42.

=== New York Giants ===
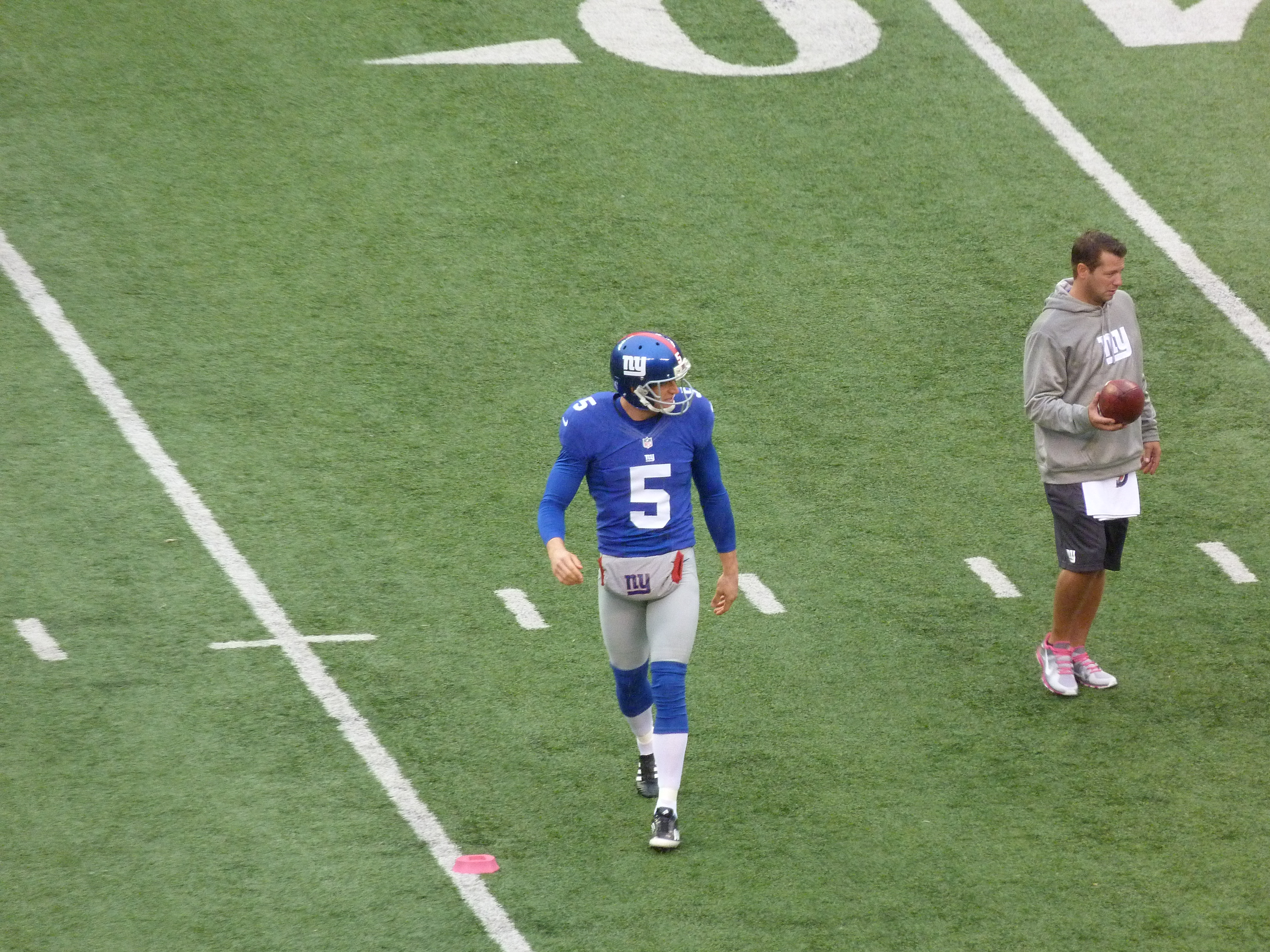
Weatherford with the Giants in 2012

Weatherford signed with the New York Giants on July 29, 2011. For the 2011 regular season, Weatherford recorded a punt average of 45.7 yards with a net punt average of 39.2 (both career highs). Weatherford has been noted for his physique and strength, uncommon for a special teams player. He was featured in the December 2011 issue of Men's Fitness, where his "maniacal" workout routine was described. He is reportedly able to squat 475 pounds and bench press almost 400 pounds, and teammates call him the "strongest player pound-for-pound" on the team.

Weatherford was the second player to enter the postseason with both New York teams. He also got his first Super Bowl title after the Giants defeated the New England Patriots by a score of 21–17 in Super Bowl XLVI. Weatherford averaged 40.8 yards per punt, and provided the Giants with integral field position, which led to a safety after an intentional grounding penalty by Tom Brady.

After the 2011 season, the Giants used the franchise tag on Weatherford while they negotiated a longer contract. On March 16, 2012, Weatherford signed a five-year contract with the Giants worth $12.75 million.

On September 4, 2015, the Giants released Weatherford, in part due to his contract.

=== New York Jets (second stint) ===
On October 24, 2015, Weatherford re-signed with the Jets after starting punter Ryan Quigley was added to the injury report with a right shin injury prior to their Week 7 matchup against the New England Patriots. The Jets called Weatherford while he was broadcasting his mid-day radio show. On October 28, 2015, Weatherford was released from the Jets when Quigley was ready to return after suffering a leg infection. Weatherford played just one game in his second stint with the organization and was paid $51,176 for filling in.

== NFL career statistics ==
Legend
**Bold**	Career high

=== Regular season ===
Year	Team	Punting									
Year	Team	GP	Punts	Yds	Net Yds	Lng	Avg	Net Avg	Blk	Ins20	TB
2006	NOR	**16**	77	3,369	2,890	59	43.8	37.5	0	19	**10**
2007	NOR	**16**	63	2,757	2,342	61	43.8	37.2	0	20	4
2008	NOR	7	26	1,094	888	61	42.1	34.2	0	5	3
2008	KAN	2	12	512	334	58	42.7	27.8	0	1	4
2008	JAX	5	21	915	792	57	43.6	37.7	0	2	3
2009	NYJ	**16**	80	3,357	2,939	66	42.0	36.7	0	25	9
2010	NYJ	**16**	84	3,581	3,202	61	42.6	38.1	0	**42**	4
2011	NYG	**16**	82	3,745	3,218	62	45.7	39.2	0	25	6
2012	NYG	**16**	58	2,757	2,284	68	**47.5**	**39.4**	0	22	6
2013	NYG	**16**	**91**	**4,271**	**3,476**	68	46.9	38.2	0	25	7
2014	NYG	**16**	80	3,640	3,129	**71**	45.5	38.6	**1**	25	6
2015	NYJ	1	4	161	123	50	40.3	30.8	0	0	0
Career		143	678	30,159	25,617	71	44.5	37.7	1	211	62

=== Playoffs ===
Year	Team	Punting									
Year	Team	GP	Punts	Yds	Net Yds	Lng	Avg	Net Avg	Blk	Ins20	TB
2006	NOR	2	8	315	258	47	39.4	32.3	0	2	1
2009	NYJ	2	12	514	467	61	42.8	38.9	0	4	2
2010	NYJ	3	15	614	442	**65**	40.9	29.5	0	3	**4**
2011	NYG	**4**	**22**	**999**	**873**	57	**45.4**	**39.7**	0	**6**	2
Career		11	57	2,442	2,040	65	42.8	35.8	0	15	9

== Outside football ==
=== Broadcasting career ===
In June 2013, Weatherford graduated from the seventh annual NFL Broadcast Boot Camp in Mt. Laurel, NJ, and has since held positions as substitute sports broadcaster on Good Day New York, ESPN SportsNation, NFL AM, and SI Now. During the 2013 season, Weatherford had a regular slot on WFAN radio on Monday nights.

In addition to his broadcasting roles, Weatherford has appeared on television, in sports magazines, and newspapers on topics including sports, health and fitness, family, fashion, and philanthropy.

In September 2015, Weatherford was recognized as the seventh most popular NFL Player on social media.

=== Philanthropy ===
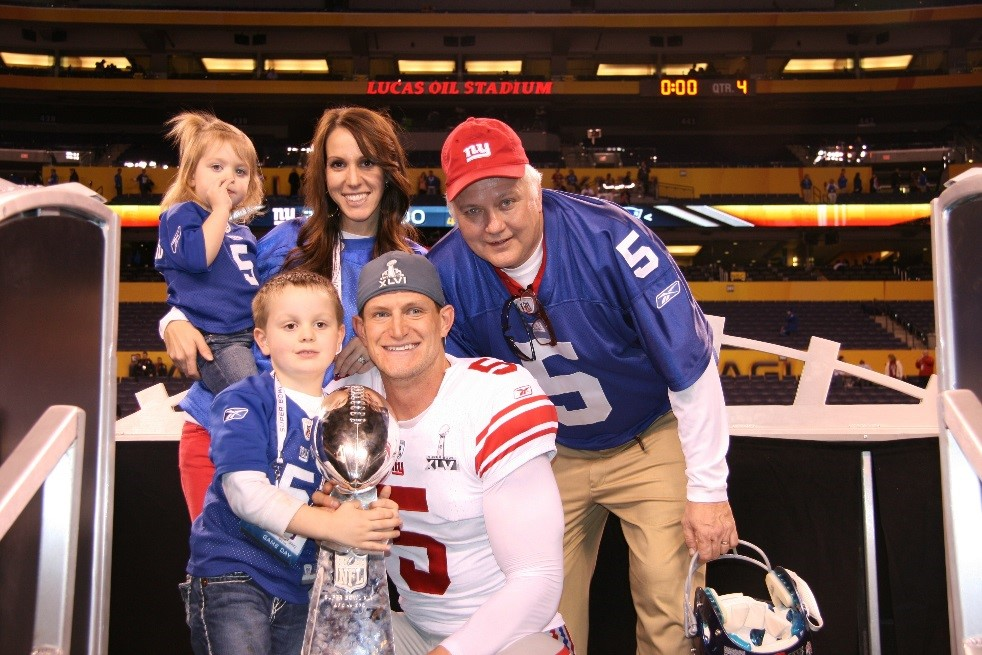
Steve and family following Super Bowl XLVI.

Weatherford has established several charities in Terre Haute, Indiana, where he was born and raised, including Rush the Punter and Kicks for Kids.

In 2013, Weatherford was named Health and Fitness Ambassador of the Boys and Girls Club in New Jersey, serving as a role model, mentor, and fitness and nutrition coach to more than 80,000 kids throughout New Jersey. In the same year, Weatherford was also named "head coach" for Wellness in the Schools, leading the charge and acting as spokesperson for that organization's recess fitness program for more than 77,000 students throughout the NY metro area.

He also serves as spokesperson for Second Chance Toys, the Breast Cancer Research Foundation and The Steve Weatherford Charity for Ghana, in addition to the charitable work he participates in on behalf of the New York Giants. In 2013, Weatherford was recognized for his outstanding community service by the NY Giants organization with the Wellington Mara Award.

== Personal life ==
Weatherford is a Christian. He and his wife, Laura, have six children. They reside in Frisco, Texas.
