= Gabe Watson =

American football player (born 1983)

No. 98
- Position: Defensive tackle

Personal information
- Born: September 24, 1983 (age 43); Novi, Michigan, U.S.
- Listed height: 6 ft 3 in (1.91 m)
- Listed weight: 338 lb (153 kg)

Career information
- High school: Southfield (Southfield, Michigan)
- College: Michigan
- NFL draft: 2006: 4th round, 107th overall pick

Career history
- Arizona Cardinals (2006–2010); New York Giants (2011)*
- * Offseason or practice squad member only

Awards and highlights
- 2× First-team All-Big Ten (2004, 2005)

Career NFL statistics
- Total tackles: 105
- Sacks: 2
- Forced fumbles: 2
- Fumble recoveries: 1
- Stats at Pro Football Reference

Gabriel Pierre Kim Watson (born September 24, 1983) is an American former professional football player who was a defensive tackle in the National Football League (NFL). He was selected by the Arizona Cardinals in the fourth round of the 2006 NFL draft. He played college football for the Michigan Wolverines.

== Early life ==
Watson was a four-year starter and lettererman on the varsity squad at Southfield High School in Southfield, Michigan. He played multiple positions, including Offensive tackle, Defensive tackle, punter, and was the team's place-kicker for two seasons, though his special teams appearances were primarily due to an injury to the starting kicker. As a senior, Watson recorded 78 tackles and 10 sacks. The team ran 85 percent of their running plays behind him on offense.

Also, while at Southfield High, Watson earned All-State honors at both offensive and defensive tackle. He also: was named All-American by Parade Magazine, selected as second-team All-USA offensive lineman by USA Today, named first-team all-state offense by the Detroit Free Press, rated #1 on The Detroit News Blue Chip list and named to their Dream Team, ranked the #1 player on Mick McCabe's Fab 50 of Michigan's top college football prospects, rated the #1 offensive lineman in the nation and earned All-America honors, the #23 overall prospect in nation, and #4 player in Midwest by Tom Lemming, named the #23 player in Midwest and #27 defensive lineman in nation by SuperPrep, ranked #3 defensive tackle and given a five-star rating (the only one in 2002 class to do so) by Rivals100.com, ranked #36 recruit by Collegefootballnews.com, rated the #21 player in country by Student Sports, named the #2 nose guard in nation by Max Emfinger, ranked the #33 offensive player in the nation by G&W Recruiting Report.

He was also on the wrestling, and track teams.

== College career ==
While playing for the University of Michigan, Watson enrolled in the College of Literature, Science and the Arts and majored in general studies.

=== Freshman (2002) ===
In 2002, Waston earned his first varsity letter. He appeared in eight games and totaled two tackles.

Watson made his first career appearance at defensive tackle against the Washington Huskies. He recorded his first career tackle at Illinois. Watson totaled one tackle against Penn State. He played defensive tackle against Purdue, Iowa, Michigan State, Minnesota and Ohio State.

=== Sophomore (2003) ===
In 2003, Watson earned a second varsity letter. He played defensive tackle in all 13 games. Watson made 13 tackles and one tackle for loss.

Watson played defensive tackle against Central Michigan, recording three tackles, including one tackle for a loss. He played defensive tackle against Houston. Watson made one tackle against Notre Dame. He recorded two tackles at Oregon. Watson recorded a career-high four tackles against Indiana. He played defensive tackle at Minnesota, recording one tackle. Watson made one tackle as a backup defensive tackle against Purdue. He played at defensive tackle at Michigan State and at Northwestern. Watson played defensive tackle against Ohio State, recording one tackle. He saw time at defensive tackle against USC in the Rose Bowl. Watson was featured on The Tonight Show with Jay Leno during the teams Rose Bowl trip.

=== Junior (2004) ===
In 2004, Watson earned his third varsity letter. He was selected All-Big Ten first-team by coaches, and All-Big Ten second-team by the media. Watson played in all 12 games and started final 11 games at defensive tackle. He set then career highs in tackles (37), tackles for loss (seven) and sacks (two). Watson tied for the team lead among defensive lineman in tackles.

Watson played at defensive tackle, and recorded one tackle against Miami. He recorded eight tackles and one tackle for loss at Notre Dame, in his first career start. Watson made two tackles against San Diego State. He recorded six tackles including one sack against Iowa. Watson started at defensive tackle at Indiana. He recorded five tackles including one sack against Minnesota. Watson recorded one tackle at Illinois. He had three tackles and one tackle for a loss at Purdue. Watson recorded five tackles against Michigan State. He made two tackles and one tackle for a loss against Northwestern. Watson recorded three tackles at Ohio State, including a career-best two tackles for loss. He recorded one tackle against Texas in the Rose Bowl.

=== Senior (2005) ===
In 2005, Watson recorded a career-high 40 tackles (24 solos) with three sacks for minus 17 yards and 6.5 stops for losses of 25 yards as a senior. He played in every game, starting the final 11 contests at nose guard. Watson was a consensus All-Big Ten Conference First-team choice and on the Lombardi Award watch list as a senior.

He finished his college career with 92 tackles, 14.5 tackles for a loss, and five sacks.

== Professional career ==
Pre-draft measurables
Height	Weight	Arm length	Hand span	40-yard dash	10-yard split	20-yard split	20-yard shuttle	Three-cone drill	Vertical jump	Broad jump	Bench press
6 ft 3 1/2 in (1.92 m)	339 lb (154 kg)	33 in (0.84 m)	9 3/4 in (0.25 m)	5.29 s	1.84 s	3.05 s	4.80 s	8.28 s	27.0 in (0.69 m)	8 ft 6 in (2.59 m)	36 reps
All values from NFL Combine/Pro Day

=== Arizona Cardinals ===
Watson was selected by the Arizona Cardinals in the fourth round of the 2006 NFL draft with the 107th overall pick.

In 2006, Watson appeared in 12 games, however was inactive for the first four games of the season.

He saw his first NFL action on the defense but did not record any statistics against the Kansas City Chiefs. Watson made his first NFL start for the injured Kendrick Clancy, during week six on Monday Night Football, recording two tackles against the Chicago Bears. He tackled Andrew Walter for his first career sack in only his second start while also recording three tackles and two quarterback pressures at the Oakland Raiders. In his third consecutive start, Watson recorded one tackle at the Green Bay Packers. He returned to the starting lineup and had three tackles at the St. Louis Rams. Watson recovered the first fumble of his career against the Seattle Seahawks. In each of the final three games of the season he recorded one tackle (three total).

In 2007, Watson appeared in all 16 regular season games. He totaled 34 tackles (25 solo).

Watson recorded his first statistics of the season during week three against the Baltimore Ravens. He recorded eight tackles, six solo. In week four against the Pittsburgh Steelers, he recorded two tackles (one solo). During week five against the Rams, Watson three tackles (three solo). In week six against the Carolina Panthers, he recorded five tackles (four solo). Then during week seven against the Washington Redskins, he recorded four tackles (three solo). In week nine against the Tampa Bay Buccaneers, he recorded on tackle. During week 10 against the Detroit Lions, Watson recorded one tackle. In week 11 against the Cincinnati Bengals, he recorded one tackle. In week 12 against the San Francisco 49ers, Watson recorded two tackles (two solo). During week 13 against the Cleveland Browns, he recorded one tackle (one solo). In week 14 against the Seahawks, Watson recorded two tackles (two solo). During week 15 against the New Orleans Saints, he recorded one tackle (one solo). In week 16 against the Atlanta Falcons, Watson recorded one tackle (one solo). In the season finale against the Rams, he recorded two tackles (one solo).

In April 2008, Watson fractured his kneecap after falling on a treadmill at a health club. He underwent surgery on the knee and will not be able to participate in off-season practices. He will be limited when camp starts in July, but is expected to be ready for week one.

In 2009, Watson appeared in all 16 games recording a total of 28 tackles.

=== New York Giants ===
Watson signed with the New York Giants on August 2, 2011. He was released during final cuts on September 3, 2011.
