= Garrett Rivas =

American football player (born 1985)

Profile
- Position: Placekicker

Personal information
- Born: June 1, 1985 (age 41); Tampa, Florida, U.S.
- Listed height: 5 ft 9 in (1.75 m)
- Listed weight: 218 lb (99 kg)

Career information
- High school: Jesuit
- College: Michigan (2003–2006)
- NFL draft: 2007: undrafted

Career history
- Tampa Bay Buccaneers (2007)*; Florida Firecats (2008–09); Tampa Bay Storm (2010)
- * Offseason or practice squad member only

Awards and highlights
- First-team All-Big Ten (2006)

Career AFL statistics
- Field goals made: 5
- Field goals attempted: 8
- Extra points made: 105
- Extra points attempted: 123
- Stats at ArenaFan.com

Garrett Rivas (born June 1, 1985) is an American former professional football placekicker who played in af2 and the Arena Football League (AFL). He played college football at Michigan where he held the former school records for career scoring, field goals and point after touchdowns and was a three-time All-Big Ten Conference selection during his time there. As a professional, he played for the Florida Firecats of af2 and the Tampa Bay Storm of the AFL.

== Early life ==
Rivas attended Jesuit High School in Tampa, Florida where he played wide receiver and kicker. He played kicker because it increased his chance to make the team. Among his high school honors was selection to the Tampa Chapter of the Hall of Fame for Scholar Athletes. Rivas also played in the U.S. Army All-American Bowl in San Antonio and played in the Florida–Georgia All-Star Game. In high school, Rivals.com ranked him as the 24th best kicker in the nation. Jesuit is fellow kicking Michigan alumn Jay Feely's alma mater. Professional kicker Xavier Beitia is also an alumnus of the school.

College recruiting
| Name | Hometown | School | Height | Weight | 40^{‡} | Commit date |
|---|---|---|---|---|---|---|
| Garrett Rivas; PK | Tampa, Florida | Jesuit (FL) | 5 ft 10 in (1.78 m) | 180 lb (82 kg) | -- | Sep 1, 2002 |
| Garrett Rivas; PK | Recruit ratings: Scout: Rivals: | | | | | |
Overall recruit ranking: Rivals: 24 (PK)
Note: In many cases, Scout, Rivals, 247Sports, On3, and ESPN may conflict in their listings of height and weight.; In these cases, the average was taken. ESPN grades are on a 100-point scale.; Sources: "Michigan Football Commitments". Rivals.; "2003 Michigan Football Commits". Scout.; "ESPN". ESPN.; "Scout.com Team Recruiting Rankings". Scout.; "2003 Team Ranking". Rivals.com.

== College career ==
As a freshman for the 2003 Wolverines, he was the regular kicker for the team from the start, making four point after touchdowns (PATs) in the first game of the season. Beginning his streak of many game-winning kicks for the Wolverines, he made the game-winner in the largest comeback in Michigan history, capping a 21-point 38–35 comeback victory against Minnesota with a 33-yard field goal with 50 seconds left in the Battle for the Little Brown Jug. Rivas was involved in a controversial national story in the October 4, 2003 when Michigan head coach Lloyd Carr changed the punting gameplan in the middle of the game by asking Rivas to line up as a punter and carry the ball or kick while rolling to his right behind a wall of blockers. After it worked twice, the Iowa Hawkeyes blocked the third attempt; the resulting great field position led to Iowa taking the lead, breaking a 20–20 tie en route to a 30–27 win.

As a sophomore for the 2004 Wolverines team, his season-best 4–4 field goal performance came in a September 11, 2004 28–20 loss to Notre Dame in the Michigan – Notre Dame football rivalry game. He posted a 4th-quarter field goal to bring the Wolverines to within 24–20 in their October 9, 27–24 win against Minnesota. He made the go-ahead 35-yard field goal with 2:45 remaining against Purdue in an October 23, 2004, 16–14 win. He also went 3–3 on field goals and 4–4 on extra points in the October 30, 2004, overtime 45–37 win against Michigan State in the Paul Bunyan Trophy game. In the season-ending 38–37 loss to Texas in the 2005 Rose Bowl, Rivas was 3–3 on field goals and 4–4 on extra points. Following the season he was recognized as an honorable mention All-Big Ten selection.

As a junior for the 2005 Wolverines, he was involved in many close games. The team's first five conference games were all decided in the final 24 seconds of regulation or in overtime. After missing a 27-yard potential game-winner in the final minute, he made the winning field goal in overtime against Michigan State. In the October 8, 2005 23–20 loss to Minnesota, Rivas missed two late chances to break a 20–20 tie: a 42-yard field goal late in the third quarter and a 34-yard kick with 8:27 left in the game. In the October 15, 27–25 last-play win against Penn State, he gave the team a 21–18 lead on a 47-yard field goal with 3:45 remaining. Rivas posted 15 points in an October 29, 2005, 33–17 win against Northwestern. At the end of the season, Rivas was named an honorable mention All-Big Ten selection for the second-straight year.

As a senior for the 2006 Wolverines, he never made more than two field goals in a game yet still managed to score a total of 93 points, one shy of his career-high set back in 2004. That year Michigan won all eleven its victories by at least seven points. At the conclusion of the Big Ten schedule, he was selected as a 2006 first-team All-Big Ten Conference selection .

Rivas set a new Michigan Wolverines football record for career scoring (354), surpassing Anthony Thomas' record of 336 set back in 2000. He also broke Remy Hamilton's field goal record of 63, set back in 1996, with 64 career field goals, and J. D. Carlson's PAT record of 137, set back in 1991, with 162. He additionally tied Mike Gillette's record from 1998 of 13 career 40-yard field goals. He held the career scoring record until 2022, when Jake Moody broke the record with 355 career points.

== Professional career ==
He signed with the Tampa Bay Buccaneers on May 3, 2007, as an undrafted free agent, but was released on June 2, 2007. Rivas signed to the Florida Firecats of the af2 league on April 25, 2008, for the 2008 and 2009 seasons. In 2009, he played in nine of the first ten games, but he did not appear in any of the last six games. During his final af2 season he completed 41 of 58 point after touchdown conversions and missed both of his field goal attempts. He played for the Tampa Bay Storm in the reincarnated Arena Football League in 2010 and participated in the Arena Bowl with the team.

He also serves as an assistant football coach and physical education teacher at Berkeley Preparatory School, where he runs the offseason football conditioning program.

== Statistics ==
Michigan

| | PAT Made | PAT att | FG Made | FG Att | Points | Long FG | FG Blocked | Punts | Yards | Avg. | Long | FC | Inside 20 |
|---|---|---|---|---|---|---|---|---|---|---|---|---|---|
| 2003 | 50 | 51 | 9 | 12 | 77 | 47 | 1 | 4 | 130 | 32.5 | 38 | 4 | 2 |
| 2004 | 37 | 41 | 19 | 24 | 94 | 47 | 1 | 0 | 0 | 0.0 | 0 | 0 | 0 |
| 2005 | 33 | 35 | 19 | 26 | 90 | 47 | 0 | 2 | 37 | 18.5 | 22 | 2 | 2 |
| 2006 | 42 | 44 | 17 | 20 | 93 | 48 | 1 | 0 | 0 | 0.0 | 0 | 0 | 0 |
| Career | 162 | 171 | 64 | 82 | 354 | 48 | 3 | 6 | 167 | 27.8 | 38 | 6 | 4 |

Professional

| | Team | PAT Made | PAT att | FG Made | FG Att | Long |
|---|---|---|---|---|---|---|
| 2008 | Florida | — | — | — | — | |
| 2009 | Florida | 41 | 58 | 0 | 2 | |
| 2010 | Tampa | 105 | 123 | 5 | 8 | 50 |

Playoffs

| | Team | PAT Made | PAT att | FG Made | FG Att | Long |
|---|---|---|---|---|---|---|
| 2010 | Tampa | 20 | 24 | 0 | 1 | |
