= 2005 All-Big Ten Conference football team =

American college football all-star team

The 2005 All-Big Ten Conference football team consists of American football players chosen as All-Big Ten Conference players for the 2005 NCAA Division I-A football season. The conference recognizes two official All-Big Ten selectors: (1) the Big Ten conference coaches selected separate offensive and defensive units and named first- and second-team players (the "Coaches" team); and (2) a panel of sports writers and broadcasters covering the Big Ten also selected offensive and defensive units and named first- and second-team players (the "Media" team).

== Offensive selections ==
=== Quarterbacks ===
- Brett Basanez, Northwestern (Coaches-1; Media-1)
- Michael Robinson, Penn State (Coaches-2; Media-2)

=== Running backs ===
- Brian Calhoun, Wisconsin (Coaches-1; Media-1)
- Laurence Maroney, Minnesota (Coaches-1; Media-1)
- Tyrell Sutton, Northwestern (Coaches-2; Media-2)
- Tony Hunt, Penn State (Coaches-2)
- Albert Young, Iowa (Media-2)

=== Receivers ===
- Jason Avant, Michigan (Coaches-1; Media-1)
- Santonio Holmes, Ohio State (Coaches-1; Media-1)
- Mark Philmore, Northwestern (Coaches-2)
- Brandon Williams, Wisconsin (Coaches-2)
- James Hardy, Indiana (Media-2)
- Dorien Bryant, Purdue (Media-2)

=== Centers ===
- Greg Eslinger, Minnesota (Coaches-1; Media-1)
- Nick Mangold, Ohio State (Coaches-2; Media-2)

=== Guards ===
- Mark Setterstrom, Minnesota (Coaches-1; Media-1)
- Rob Sims, Ohio State (Coaches-1; Media-2)
- Matt Lentz, Michigan (Coaches-2; Media-1)
- Jordan Grimes, Purdue (Coaches-2)
- Leo Henige, Michigan (Media-2)

=== Tackles ===
- Joe Thomas, Wisconsin (Coaches-1; Media-1)
- Levi Brown, Penn State (Coaches-1; Media-2)
- Adam Stenavich, Michigan (Coaches-2; Media-1)
- Zach Strief, Northwestern (Coaches-2; Media-2)

=== Tight ends ===
- Matt Spaeth, Minnesota (Coaches-1; Media-1)
- Tim Massaquoi, Michigan (Coaches-2; Media-2)

== Defensive selections ==
=== Defensive linemen ===
- Mike Kudla, Ohio State (Coaches-1; Media-1)
- Tamba Hali, Penn State (Coaches-1; Media-1)
- Gabe Watson, Michigan (Coaches-1; Media-1)
- Scott Paxson, Penn State (Coaches-1)
- Kenny Iwebema, Iowa (Media-1)
- Victor Adeyanju, Indiana (Coaches-2; Media-2)
- Anthony Montgomery, Minnesota (Coaches-2)
- Barry Cofield, Northwestern (Coaches-2)
- Quinn Pitcock, Ohio State (Coaches-2)
- Rob Ninkovich, Purdue (Coaches-2; Media-2)
- Jay Alford, Penn State (Media-2)
- Matthew Rice, Penn State (Media-2)

=== Linebackers ===
- Chad Greenway, Iowa (Coaches-1; Media-1)
- A. J. Hawk, Ohio State (Coaches-1; Media-1)
- Paul Posluszny, Penn State (Coaches-1; Media-1)
- Abdul Hodge, Iowa (Coaches-2; Media-2)
- Tim McGarigle, Northwestern (Coaches-2; Media-2)
- Bobby Carpenter, Ohio State (Coaches-2; Media-2)

=== Defensive backs ===
- Nate Salley, Ohio State (Coaches-1; Media-1)
- Ashton Youboty, Ohio State (tie) (Coaches-1; Media-1)
- Alan Zemaitis, Penn State (Coaches-1; Media-1)
- Calvin Lowry, Penn State (tie) (Coaches-1; Media-2)
- Jovon Johnson, Iowa (Coaches-2; Media-1)
- Donte Whitner, Ohio State (Coaches-1)
- Leon Hall, Michigan (Coaches-2; Media-2)
- Eric Smith, Michigan State (Coaches-2)
- Marquise Cole, Northwestern (Media-2)
- Roderick Rogers, Wisconsin (Media-2)

== Special teams ==
=== Kickers ===
- Josh Huston, Ohio State (Coaches-1; Media-1)
- Kyle Schlicher, Iowa (Coaches-2; Media-s)

=== Punters ===
- Ken Debauche, Wisconsin (Coaches-1; Media-1)
- Steve Weatherford, Illinois (Coaches-2; Media-2)

== Key ==
Bold = selected as a first-team player by both the coaches and media panel

Coaches = selected by Big Ten Conference coaches

Media = selected by a media panel

HM = Honorable mention

== See also ==
- 2005 College Football All-America Team
