= Mark Setterstrom =

American football player (born 1984)

No. 66
- Position: Guard

Personal information
- Born: March 3, 1984 (age 42); Northfield, Minnesota, U.S.
- Listed height: 6 ft 4 in (1.93 m)
- Listed weight: 318 lb (144 kg)

Career information
- High school: Northfield
- College: Minnesota
- NFL draft: 2006: 7th round, 242nd overall pick

Career history
- St. Louis Rams (2006–2010)

Awards and highlights
- Second-team All-American (2005); 2× First-team All-Big Ten (2004, 2005); Fourth-team Freshman All-American (2002); Big Ten All-Freshman (2002)

Career NFL statistics
- Games played: 19
- Games started: 12
- Fumble recoveries: 1
- Stats at Pro Football Reference

Mark David Setterstrom (born March 3, 1984) is an American former professional football player who was a guard for the St. Louis Rams of the National Football League (NFL). He played college football for the Minnesota Golden Gophers and was selected by the St. Louis Rams in the seventh round of the 2006 NFL draft.

== Early life ==
Setterstrom earned All-State, All-Metro, and All-Conference honors as senior at Northfield High School in Minnesota, where he was a two-way lineman who totaled 127 tackles, six sacks, five forced fumbles, and six fumble recoveries over career for Northfield Raiders. Also, he was a four-year letter-winner as heavyweight wrestler, compiling a 38–3 record as a senior.

== College career ==
Setterstrom played collegiately at the University of Minnesota from 2002 to 2005. During his career with the Gophers, Mark was a two-time First-team All-Big Ten selection (2004–2005), a Second-team All-American (2005) and an All-American selection by Rivals.com in 2004. He was a Second-team All-America and First-team All-Big Ten honors as a senior as a key cog on Gophers' line that allowed three sacks, lowest in Big Ten and best in school history. As a junior, earned All-America selection by Rivals.com and First-team All-Big Ten as part of offensive line that allowed nine sacks, best in school history and second in Big Ten history. He was an Honorable mention All-Big Ten selection in sophomore year. and a Fourth-team All-America Freshman selection by The Sporting News and Big Ten All-Freshman Team.

== Professional career ==
Pre-draft measurables
Height	Weight	40-yard dash	20-yard shuttle	Three-cone drill	Vertical jump	Broad jump	Bench press
6 ft 4 in (1.93 m)	314 lb (142 kg)	5.38 s	4.53 s	7.63 s	26 1/2 in (0.67 m)	8 ft 4 in (2.54 m)	19 reps
All values from NFL Combine.

Setterstrom was selected by the Rams in the seventh round of the 2006 NFL draft with the 242nd overall pick. He signed a three-year $1.08 million contract with the Rams on July 22, 2006. In his rookie season with St. Louis, Setterstrom appeared in seven games, starting six of those at left guard. In 2007, he opened the season as starter at left guard, starting the first three games of the season before suffering a season-ending knee injury in Week 3 and he was placed on reserve/injured list 9/26/2007. Also he missed all of the 2008 season with knee injuries but was re-signed by the Rams to one-year deal during the 2009 off-season. Setterstrom was not tendered a contract by the Rams following the 2010 season, making him a free agent.
