= 2004 All-Big Ten Conference football team =

American college football all-star team

The 2004 All-Big Ten Conference football team consists of American football players chosen as All-Big Ten Conference players for the 2004 Big Ten Conference football season. The conference recognizes two official All-Big Ten selectors: (1) the Big Ten conference coaches selected separate offensive and defensive units and named first- and second-team players (the "Coaches" team); and (2) a panel of sports writers and broadcasters covering the Big Ten also selected offensive and defensive units and named first- and second-team players (the "Media" team).

== Offensive selections ==
=== Quarterbacks ===
- Drew Tate, Iowa (Coaches-1; Media-2)
- Kyle Orton, Purdue (Coaches-2; Media-1)

=== Running backs ===
- Mike Hart, Michigan (Coaches-1; Media-1)
- Laurence Maroney, Minnesota (Coaches-1; Media-1)
- Noah Herron, Northwestern (Coaches-2; Media-2)
- Anthony Davis, Wisconsin (Coaches-2; Media-2)

=== Receivers ===
- Braylon Edwards, Michigan (Coaches-1; Media-1)
- Taylor Stubblefield, Purdue (Coaches-1; Media-1)
- Jason Avant, Michigan (Coaches-2)
- Santonio Holmes, Ohio State (Coaches-2)
- Courtney Roby, Indiana (Media-2)
- Clinton Solomon, Iowa (Media-2)

=== Centers ===
- Greg Eslinger, Minnesota (Coaches-1 [tie]; Media-1)
- David Baas, Michigan (Coaches-1 [tie]; Media-2)

=== Guards ===
- Dan Buenning, Wisconsin (Coaches-1; Media-1)
- Matt Lentz, Michigan (Coaches-1; Media-2)
- Mark Setterstrom, Minnesota (Coaches-2; Media-1)
- Jonathan Clinkscale, Wisconsin (Coaches-2)
- William Whitticker, Michigan State (Media-2)

=== Tackles ===
- Rian Melander, Minnesota (Coaches-1; Media-1)
- Adam Stenavich, Michigan (Coaches-1; Media-2)
- Sean Poole, Michigan State (Coaches-2; Media-1)
- Zach Strief, Northwestern (Coaches-2; Media-2)
- Jake Long, Michigan (Coaches-2)

=== Tight ends ===
- Tim Massaquoi, Michigan (Coaches-1; Media-1)
- Jason Randall, Michigan State (Coaches-2)
- Charles Davis, Purdue (Media-2)

== Defensive selections ==
=== Defensive linemen ===
- Matt Roth, Iowa (Coaches-1; Media-1)
- Anttaj Hawthorne, Wisconsin (Coaches-1; Media-1)
- Erasmus James, Wisconsin (Coaches-1; Media-1)
- Gabe Watson, Michigan (Coaches-1; Media-2)
- Jonathan Babineaux, Iowa (Coaches-2; Media-1)
- Luis Castillo, Northwestern (Coaches-2; Media-2)
- Tamba Hali, Penn State (Coaches-2; Media-2)
- Simon Fraser, Ohio State (Coaches-2)
- Darrell Reid, Minnesota (Media-2)

=== Linebackers ===
- Chad Greenway, Iowa (Coaches-1; Media-1)
- A. J. Hawk, Ohio State (Coaches-1; Media-1)
- Abdul Hodge, Iowa (Coaches-1; Media-2)
- Tim McGarigle, Northwestern (Coaches-2; Media-1)
- Paul Posluszny, Penn State (Coaches-2; Media-2)
- LaMarr Woodley, Michigan (Coaches-2)
- Kyle Killion, Indiana (Media-2)

=== Defensive backs ===
- Marlin Jackson, Michigan (Coaches-1; Media-1)
- Ernest Shazor, Michigan (Coaches-1; Media-1)
- Jim Leonhard, Wisconsin (Coaches-1; Media-1)
- Scott Starks, Wisconsin (Coaches-1; Media-2)
- Ukee Dozier, Minnesota (Media-1)
- Kelvin Hayden, Illinois (Coaches-2; Media-2)
- Alan Zemaitis, Penn State (Coaches-2; Media-2)
- Nate Salley, Ohio State (Coaches-2)
- Bernard Pollard, Purdue (Coaches-2)
- Herana-Daze Jones, Indiana (Media-2)

== Special teams ==
=== Kickers ===
- Mike Nugent, Ohio State (Coaches-1; Media-1)
- Dave Rayner, Michigan State (Coaches-2; Media-2)

=== Punters ===
- Steve Weatherford, Illinois (Coaches-1; Media-2)
- Brandon Fields, Michigan State (Coaches-2; Media-1)

== Key ==
Bold = selected as a first-team player by both the coaches and media panel

Coaches = selected by Big Ten Conference coaches

Media = selected by a media panel

HM = Honorable mention

== See also ==
- 2004 College Football All-America Team
