= Grant Mason =

American football player (born 1983)

No. 41
- Position: Cornerback

Personal information
- Born: August 18, 1983 (age 43); Pontiac, Michigan, U.S.
- Listed height: 6 ft 0 in (1.83 m)
- Listed weight: 198 lb (90 kg)

Career information
- High school: St. Mary's Preparatory (Orchard Lake Village, Michigan)
- College: Michigan
- NFL draft: 2006: undrafted

Career history
- New Orleans Saints (2006)*; Amsterdam Admirals (2007); Pittsburgh Steelers (2007–2008); San Diego Chargers (2008–2009)*; Florida Tuskers (2009)*
- * Offseason or practice squad member only

Career NFL statistics
- Total tackles: 3
- Stats at Pro Football Reference

Grant Mason (born August 18, 1983) is an American former professional football player who was a cornerback in the National Football League (NFL). He played college football for the Michigan Wolverines and was signed by the New Orleans Saints as an undrafted free agent in 2007.

Mason was also a member of the Amsterdam Admirals, Pittsburgh Steelers, San Diego Chargers, and Florida Tuskers.

== Early life ==
Mason attended St. Mary's Preparatory in Orchard Lake, Michigan.

== Professional career ==
=== Florida Tuskers ===
Mason was signed by the Florida Tuskers of the United Football League on August 25, 2009.
