= Matt Lentz =

American football player (born 1982)

No. 67
- Position: Guard

Personal information
- Born: November 19, 1982 (age 44); Ortonville, Michigan, U.S.
- Listed height: 6 ft 6 in (1.98 m)
- Listed weight: 320 lb (145 kg)

Career information
- College: Michigan
- NFL draft: 2006: undrafted

Career history
- New York Giants (2006–2007); Pittsburgh Steelers (2007–2008)*; Tampa Bay Buccaneers (2008)*; Detroit Lions (2009)*; Florida Tuskers (2009)*; California Redwoods (2009); Sacramento Mountain Lions (2010)
- * Offseason or practice squad member only

Awards and highlights
- 2× First-team All-Big Ten (2004, 2005)

Matt Lentz (born November 19, 1982) is an American former professional football player who was a guard in the National Football League (NFL). He played college football for the Michigan Wolverines and was signed by the New York Giants as an undrafted free agent in 2006.

Lentz was also a member of the Pittsburgh Steelers, Tampa Bay Buccaneers, Detroit Lions, Florida Tuskers, California Redwoods and Sacramento Mountain Lions.

== Early life ==
Lentz attended Ortonville Brandon High school in Ortonville, Michigan.

== College career ==
Lentz attended the University of Michigan, earning his first varsity letter as a sophomore in 2002. He went on to become a three-year starter at right guard, and a two-time All-Big Ten first-teamer. He majored in General Studies.

== Professional career ==
=== New York Giants ===
Lentz was signed by the New York Giants as an undrafted free agent in 2006. He played his first game for the Giants in their fourth preseason game in 2006, helping protect backup quarterback Jared Lorenzen complete 10-of-15 passes for 116 yards in a 31-23 victory over the New England Patriots.

Lentz did not start a regular season game during his time with the Giants, and was released during the final roster cuts before the 2007 regular season. The day after, Lentz was signed to the Giants practice squad. September 11, 2007, Lentz had his contract terminated from the practice squad.

=== Detroit Lions ===
Lentz was signed by the Detroit Lions April 7, 2009, only to be waived April 28.

=== Florida Tuskers ===
Lentz signed with the Florida Tuskers of the United Football League September 9, 2009.
