= Adam Stenavich =

American football player and coach (born 1983)

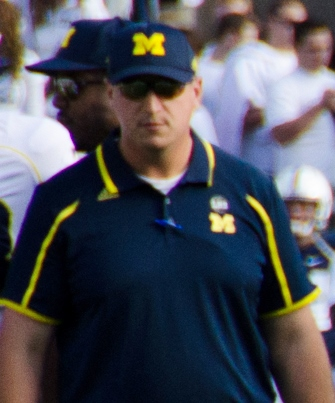
- Stenavich with the Michigan Wolverines in 2013

Green Bay Packers
- Title: Offensive coordinator

Personal information
- Born: March 11, 1983 (age 43); Marshfield, Wisconsin, U.S.
- Listed height: 6 ft 4 in (1.93 m)
- Listed weight: 310 lb (141 kg)

Career information
- Position: Offensive tackle
- High school: Marshfield
- College: Michigan
- NFL draft: 2006: undrafted

Career history

Playing
- Carolina Panthers (2006)*; Green Bay Packers (2006–2007)*; → Amsterdam Admirals (2007); Dallas Cowboys (2008)*; Houston Texans (2008–2010)*
- * Offseason or practice squad member only

Coaching
- Michigan (2011) Strength and conditioning intern; Michigan (2012–2013) Graduate assistant; Northern Arizona (2014) Offensive line coach; San Jose State (2015–2016) Offensive line coach; San Francisco 49ers (2017–2018) Assistant offensive line coach; Green Bay Packers (2019–2020) Offensive line coach; Green Bay Packers (2021) Offensive line coach & run game coordinator; Green Bay Packers (2022–present) Offensive coordinator

Awards and highlights
- As player: Sporting News Freshman All-American (2002); 2× first-team All-Big Ten (2004, 2005)
- Coaching profile at Pro Football Reference

Adam Walter Stenavich (born March 11, 1983) is an American professional football coach and former offensive tackle who is the offensive coordinator for the Green Bay Packers of the National Football League (NFL). He previously served as an assistant coach for the San Francisco 49ers, San Jose State University, Northern Arizona University and the University of Michigan.

Stenavich played college football for the Michigan Wolverines and was signed by the Carolina Panthers as an undrafted free agent in 2006. He has also played for the Green Bay Packers and Dallas Cowboys.

== Early life ==
Stenavich graduated from Marshfield High School in Marshfield, Wisconsin. At Michigan, he earned a bachelor's degree in history.

== Playing career ==
=== College ===
Stenavich took over as starting left tackle at Michigan his sophomore year and kept the spot through his senior year. He was named to the All Big Ten first-team in 2004 and the All Big Ten second-team in 2005. He was also a recipient of the Hugh R. Rader Jr. Memorial Award as Michigan's top offensive lineman in 2005.

=== National Football League ===
==== Pre-draft ====
Pre-draft measurables
Height	Weight	Arm length	Hand span	40-yard dash	20-yard shuttle	Three-cone drill	Vertical jump	Broad jump	Bench press
6 ft 4 in (1.93 m)	310 lb (141 kg)	32 7/8 in (0.84 m)	9 5/8 in (0.24 m)	5.60 s	4.82 s	7.91 s	25.0 in (0.64 m)	7 ft 9 in (2.36 m)	24 reps
All values from NFL Combine/Pro Day

Prior to the draft, it was reported that Stenavich struggled with speed pass-rushers and would possibly move inside to guard at the professional level.

==== Carolina Panthers ====
After completing his career at the University of Michigan, Stenavich was not selected in the 2006 NFL draft. Within hours of the draft, Stenavich was signed by the Carolina Panthers. After pre-season training, Stenavich was released.

==== Green Bay Packers ====
Stenavich was signed to the Green Bay Packers practice squad during the 2006–2007 season. He re-signed with the Packers as a reserve/future free agent, January 1, 2007. The Packers designated Stenavich eligible for play in NFL Europa in 2007 and he was selected in the first round by the Amsterdam Admirals. He returned to the Packers following the NFL Europe season, but was released as part of the team's final roster cuts before the 2007–2008 season.

==== Dallas Cowboys ====
On May 14, 2008, Stenavich was signed by the Dallas Cowboys. He was released on August 29 to allow guard Larry Allen to re-sign and retire a Cowboy.

==== Houston Texans ====
Three days after his release from the Cowboys, Stenavich was signed to the practice squad of the Houston Texans on September 1, 2008. He spent the 2009 season on the team's practice squad as well, and was re-signed to a future contract on January 5, 2010. On September 4, 2010, Stenavich was cut by the Texans

== Coaching career ==
=== Michigan ===
At the conclusion of his playing career, Stenavich moved on to coaching. In 2011, he joined the Michigan staff as a strength and conditioning intern.

In 2012, Stenavich remained on staff as an offensive graduate assistant coach.

=== Northern Arizona ===
In 2014, Stenavich was offensive line coach at Northern Arizona University.

=== San Jose State ===
Stenavich was hired by San Jose State in February 2015 to be offensive line coach under Ron Caragher. San Jose State fired Caragher after the 2016 season.

=== San Francisco 49ers ===
In 2017, Stenavich joined Curt Mallory's staff at Indiana State for a brief time before being named assistant offensive line coach for the San Francisco 49ers.

=== Green Bay Packers ===
On January 18, 2019, Stenavich was hired by the Green Bay Packers as their offensive line coach under head coach Matt LaFleur.

On March 1, 2021, Stenavich was promoted to offensive line/run game coordinator.

In 2021, Stenavich's unit dealt with the loss of many key players. Star offensive tackle David Bakhtiari played just one half of football throughout the entire season, while his replacement, All-Pro lineman Elgton Jenkins, was lost to a season-ending knee injury in Week 11. Rookie center Josh Myers left a Week 6 game with a knee injury and did not return until the playoffs, and starting right tackle Billy Turner was lost to a knee injury during their Week 14 matchup. For their penultimate regular season game against the Minnesota Vikings in Week 17, the Packers' starting offensive line consisted of, from left to right, former undrafted free agent Yosh Nijman, 2020 sixth-round pick Jon Runyan Jr., former undrafted rookie free agent Lucas Patrick, rookie fourth-round pick Royce Newman, and free-agent signing Dennis Kelly. Despite the injuries, quarterback Aaron Rodgers was sacked on just 5.3% of his dropbacks, and won the NFL MVP award for the second consecutive season, while running backs Aaron Jones and A. J. Dillon both had 750-yard seasons.

On January 31, 2022, Stenavich was promoted to offensive coordinator following the departure of Nathaniel Hackett who was hired as the head coach of the Denver Broncos.

== Personal life ==
Stenavich and his wife, Katie, have four children together.
