= Marlin Jackson =

American football player (born 1983)

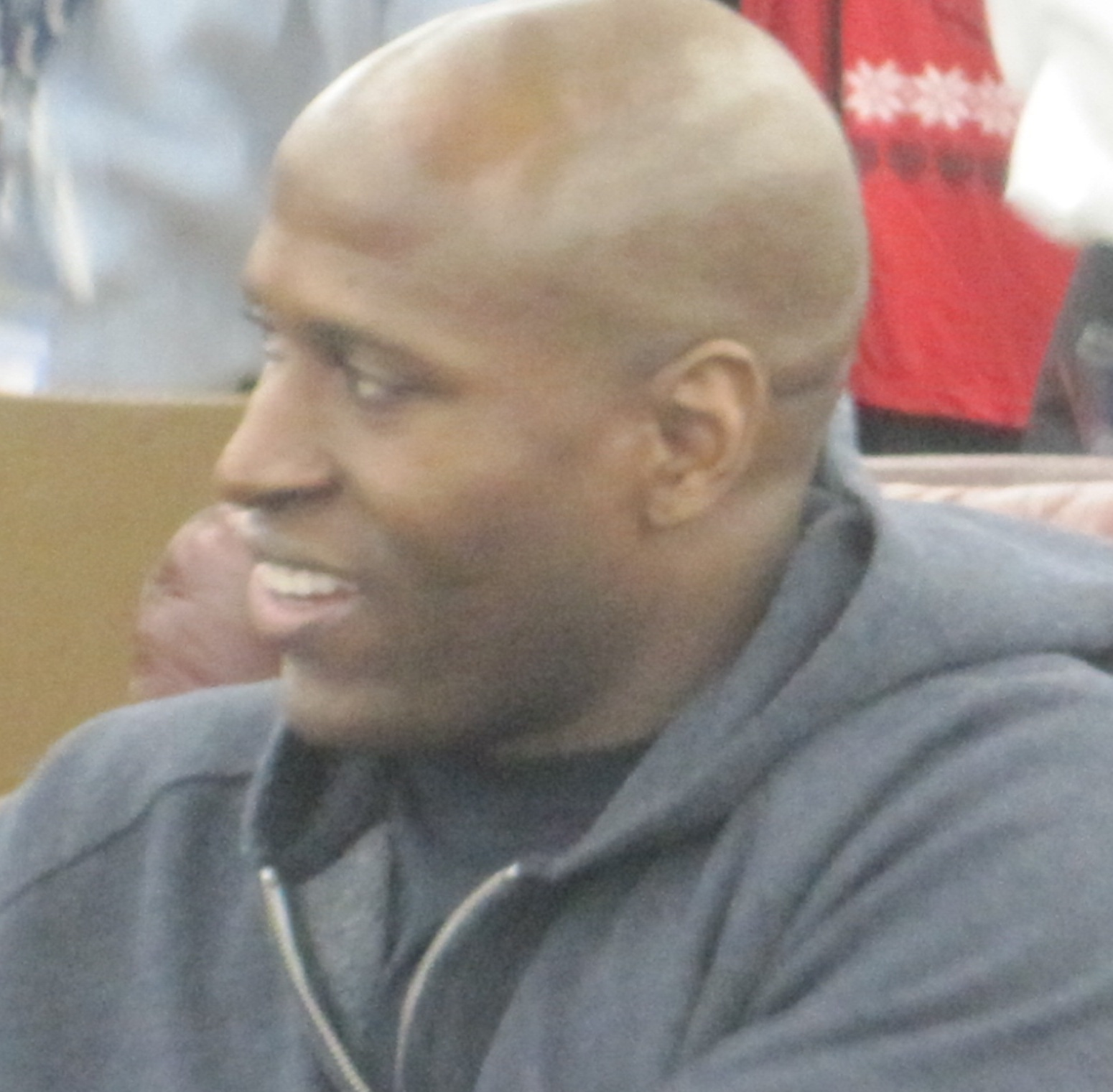
- Jackson in 2010

No. 28
- Position: Cornerback

Personal information
- Born: June 30, 1983 (age 43); Sharon, Pennsylvania, U.S.
- Listed height: 6 ft 0 in (1.83 m)
- Listed weight: 196 lb (89 kg)

Career information
- High school: Sharon
- College: Michigan (2001–2004)
- NFL draft: 2005: 1st round, 29th overall pick

Career history
- Indianapolis Colts (2005–2009); Philadelphia Eagles (2010)

Awards and highlights
- Super Bowl champion (XLI); Consensus All-American (2004); First-team All-American (2002); 2× First-team All-Big Ten (2002, 2004)

Career NFL statistics
- Total tackles: 284
- Sacks: 0.5
- Forced fumbles: 2
- Fumble recoveries: 2
- Interceptions: 4
- Stats at Pro Football Reference

Marlin Tyrell Jackson (born June 30, 1983) is an American former professional football player in the National Football League (NFL). He played college football for the Michigan Wolverines, and was recognized as a two-time All-American. The Indianapolis Colts selected him in the first round of the 2005 NFL draft. Jackson won Super Bowl XLI with the Colts against the Chicago Bears. He finished his career with the Philadelphia Eagles.

== Early life ==
Jackson was born in Sharon, Pennsylvania. He attended Sharon High School, and played for the Sharon Tigers high school football team. During his high school career, he compiled 281 career tackles, nineteen tackles for losses, three quarterback sacks, seven forced fumbles, three recovered fumbles and eighteen interceptions, including four touchdown returns. On offense, he rushed for 330 yards and five touchdowns, and caught fifty-seven passes for 1,026 yards and eighteen touchdowns. Jackson earned all-state honors, was the Pennsylvania high school player of the year and picked for the USA Today and Prep Football Report All-American teams. He played in the first-ever U.S. Army All-American Bowl game on December 30, 2000.

== College career ==
Jackson attended the University of Michigan, where he played for coach Lloyd Carr's Michigan Wolverines football team from 2001 to 2004. He was recognized as a first-team All-American in 2002 by Pro Football Weekly. As senior team captain in 2004, he was a first-team All-Big Ten selection, and a consensus first-team All-American, having received first-team honors from the Associated Press, American Football Coaches Association, Football Writers Association of American, The Sporting News, and ESPN.

Jackson finished his career as the second all-time leader among Michigan players in pass breakups. During his senior year, opposing coaches and quarterbacks, concerned at Jackson's interception and pass break-up ability, threw less than fourteen percent of their passes in his direction.

== Professional career ==
Pre-draft measurables
Height	Weight	40-yard dash	10-yard split	20-yard split	20-yard shuttle	Three-cone drill	Vertical jump	Broad jump	Bench press
6 ft 1 in (1.85 m)	198 lb (90 kg)	4.52 s	1.57 s	2.64 s	3.96 s	6.95 s	36 in (0.91 m)	10 ft 5 in (3.18 m)	23 reps
All values from 2005 NFL Scouting Combine

=== Indianapolis Colts ===
Jackson was selected by the Indianapolis Colts in the first round with the 29th overall pick of the 2005 NFL draft. As an NFL rookie he had 52 tackles and one interception. Marlin played mostly in passing situations with one start in 15 games. In his second season, he had 82 tackles and 1 interception. He started at safety in place of the injured Bob Sanders. Marlin's career high was a 14 tackle performance against the Houston Texans.

On January 21, 2007, Jackson intercepted New England Patriots quarterback Tom Brady with 18 seconds left in the fourth quarter of the AFC Championship Game to seal the Colts' 38–34 victory and send them to Super Bowl XLI against the Chicago Bears, which they subsequently won.

On October 30, 2008, Jackson injured his knee during practice. Marlin had surgery to repair the damage and missed the remainder of the 2008 season. Yahoo! Sports delivered an update on his status on June 25 saying that he "looks to be making strong progress from midseason knee surgery."

On March 5, 2010, Jackson was declared a free agent after he was non-tendered by the Colts.

=== Philadelphia Eagles ===
Jackson was signed to a two-year, $6 million contract with the Philadelphia Eagles on March 10, 2010. There, he would be converted from cornerback to free safety.

Jackson suffered a right Achilles tendon rupture in a mini-camp practice on June 1. He was placed on the injured reserve list on June 10.

Jackson was released on September 3, 2011, during final roster cuts.

=== Other work ===
After retiring from football, Jackson joined Indianapolis local news station WISH-TV as an analyst of Colts news.

=== NFL statistics ===
Year	Team	GP	COMB	TOTAL	AST	SACK	FF	FR	FR YDS	INT	IR YDS	AVG IR	LNG	TD	PD
2005	IND	15	58	43	15	0.0	0	0	0	1	16	16	16	0	4
2006	IND	14	82	61	21	0.0	0	0	0	1	24	24	24	0	5
2007	IND	16	87	69	18	0.5	1	2	0	1	0	0	0	0	4
2008	IND	7	47	41	6	0.0	1	0	0	0	0	0	0	0	1
2009	IND	4	10	7	3	0.0	0	0	0	1	3	3	3	0	1
Career		56	284	221	63	0.5	2	2	0	4	43	11	24	0	15

== Personal life ==
His older brother Elmarko Jackson was a running back for Temple University. He was involved in an incident which made headlines in 2000 when he was stabbed several times on campus after an argument with another student. Elmarko Jackson's son (also named Elmarko Jackson) is a college basketball player for Georgetown University.

=== Legal ===
Jackson was charged with felonious assault in the summer of 2003. A 26-year-old man accused Jackson of striking him in the right eye with a bottle on June 1, requiring 17 stitches, in Ann Arbor, Michigan.

On February 19, 2009, Jackson won the civil lawsuit regarding this incident. Not only did the jury find Jackson not liable for any damages, they rejected the claim that he attacked the plaintiff with a bottle, found the plaintiff liable for defamation and malicious prosecution, and awarded Jackson $225,000 in damages.
