= Ernest Shazor =

American football player (born 1983)

No. 35
- Position: Safety

Personal information
- Born: July 14, 1983 (age 43); Detroit, Michigan, U.S.
- Listed height: 6 ft 4 in (1.93 m)
- Listed weight: 231 lb (105 kg)

Career information
- High school: King (Detroit)
- College: Michigan
- NFL draft: 2005: undrafted

Career history
- Arizona Cardinals (2005)

Awards and highlights
- Consensus All-American (2004); First-team All-Big Ten (2004); Second-team All-Big Ten (2003)
- Stats at Pro Football Reference

Ernest Haskel Shazor (born July 13, 1983) is an American former professional football player who was a safety for one season with the Arizona Cardinals of the National Football League (NFL) . He played college football for the Michigan Wolverines, earning consensus All-American honors in 2004. He joined the Cardinals as an undrafted free agent.

== Early life ==
Shazor was born in Detroit, Michigan. He attended Martin Luther King High School in Detroit, where he played for the King Crusaders high school football team. As a senior in 2000, he led the Crusaders to their first Detroit Public School League title since 1991. The Parade magazine high school All-American was selected Michigan Player of the Year by USA Today in his final campaign. He was rated the best prep prospect in the Midwest and the No. 3 defensive back in the nation by SuperPrep. He was a consensus all-state choice and a member of The Detroit News ' Blue Chip List (top-rated player).

He recorded 224 tackles, caused two fumbles, blocked eight punts and intercepted 21 passes as a safety, and tallied 11 receptions and four touchdowns as a wide receiver during his last two years at MLK. Shazor was credited with 97 tackles, eight interceptions, two forced fumbles and blocked two punts during his senior year. He was also part of the track team at MLK where he ran a personal best 10.7 in the 100 meter dash.

== College career ==
Shazor attended the University of Michigan, and played for coach Lloyd Carr's Michigan Wolverines football team for three years from 2002 to 2004. Shazor redshirted as a freshman and appeared in 12 games as a reserve safety in 2002, posting 25 tackles (18 solos) with a four-yard sack and two forced fumbles. He took over strong safety duties in 2003, starting the final 11 games. Shazor finished fourth on the team with 57 tackles (40 unassisted), adding eight stops behind the line of scrimmage, two interceptions and three pass deflections.

As a junior in 2004, Shazor started every game at strong safety and led Michigan with 84 overall tackles (17 solo), 10 tackles for loss, two interceptions, and two fumble recoveries. At the end of the 2004 season, Shazor was selected as a first-team All-American by the Associated Press, Football Writers Association of American, Walter Camp Football Foundation, Sports Illustrated, ESPN, CBS Sports, College Football News, and Rivals.com. He was also a finalist for the coveted Jim Thorpe Award.

In three seasons with the Wolverines from 2002 to 2004, Shazor was credited with 166 overall tackles (125 solo), 19 tackles for loss, three sacks for minus-23 yards, eight pass break-ups, five forced fumbles and two fumble recoveries. He also had four interceptions for 123 yards in returns and a touchdown.

== Professional career ==
In January 2005, Shazor announced that he would forgo his final year of eligibility in order to play professional football. Though undrafted in the 2005 NFL draft, Shazor was signed as a free agent by the Arizona Cardinals in April 2005. He was activated on the Cardinals' roster in mid-November 2005, and he played in two games for the Cardinals during the 2005 NFL season. The Cardinals announced Shazor's release and granted him an injury settlement September 4, 2006.

In December 2006, Shazor agreed to a one-year contract with the Orlando Predators of the Arena Football League. In February 2007, the Predators announced that Shazor had not shown up for training camp, and no explanation had been given for his absence. Nearly two weeks later, The Orlando Sentinel reported that the "mystery surrounding" Shazor continued as he had still not shown up in the Predators' training camp. He was put on waivers by the Predators in May 2007.
