= 2005 Rose Bowl =

American college football game

2005 Rose Bowl presented by Citi
- 91st Rose Bowl Game
Michigan Wolverines	Texas Longhorns
(9–2)	(10–1)
Big Ten	Big 12
37	38
Head coach: Lloyd Carr	Head coach: Mack Brown
AP / Coaches / BCS; 13 / 12 / 13	AP / Coaches / BCS; 6 / 5 / 4
	1	2	3	4	Total
Michigan	0	14	17	6	37
Texas	7	7	7	17	38
- Date: January 1, 2005
- Season: 2004
- Stadium: Rose Bowl
- Location: Pasadena, California
- MVP: Offensive: Vince Young (QB, Texas); Defensive: LaMarr Woodley (LB, Michigan)
- National anthem: Michigan Marching Band
- Referee: Dennis Hennigan (Big East)
- Halftime show: Michigan Marching Band; University of Texas Longhorn Band
- Attendance: 93,467
- Payout: US$14.5 million

United States TV coverage
- Network: ABC
- Announcers: Keith Jackson (play-by-play); Dan Fouts (analyst); Todd Harris (sideline)

The 2005 Rose Bowl Game was the 91st edition of the college football bowl game, held on January 1, 2005 at the self-named stadium in Pasadena, California. The Texas Longhorns, second-place finishers in the Big 12 Conference's South Division, defeated the Michigan Wolverines, co-champions of the Big Ten Conference, 38–37. Texas quarterback Vince Young and Michigan linebacker LaMarr Woodley were named the Rose Bowl Players of the Game, the first time that the Rose Bowl separately recognized an offensive and defensive player of the game.

The contest marked the first time Texas and Michigan faced each other in football, despite the long history of each school's football program, and also marked the first Rose Bowl in which a Big Ten team appeared without an opponent from the Pacific-10 Conference. ABC broadcast the game nationally in 720p format, the first time the Rose Bowl was telecast in HDTV in the United States.

The game would mark the first of 2 consecutive Rose Bowl appearances for the Longhorns, as they would also play in the 2006 iteration, which they would win over the USC Trojans.

== Teams ==
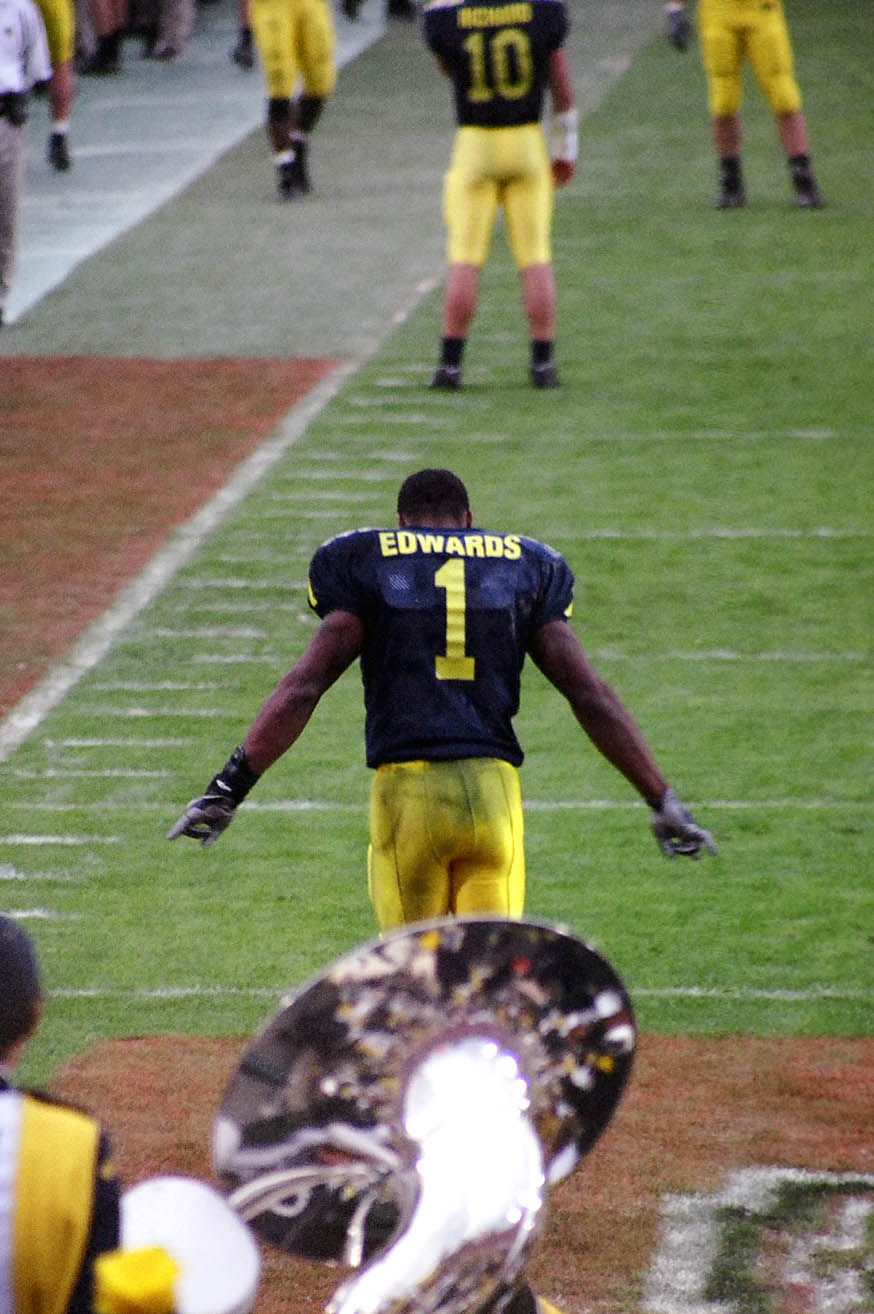
Braylon Edwards caught three touchdown receptions.

The USC Trojans and the Oklahoma Sooners were invited to play in the BCS Championship game in the 2005 Orange Bowl. This gave the Rose Bowl an at-large pick, as it gave up its traditional Pacific-10 Conference champion representative. The 2005 Fiesta Bowl also got an at-large pick, having given up Oklahoma to the Orange Bowl. Because the BCS non-AQ Utah Utes team had finished ranked in the top eight, either the Fiesta Bowl or Rose Bowl had to select them. That left one other slot open for the highest BCS ranked team. The Rose Bowl had first choice of this team over Utah, having given up the higher-ranked team.

There was a BCS controversy in the remaining at-large team that was selected to play in the BCS bowl games. The California Golden Bears expected to get the invitation, having only lost one game to the top-ranked and undefeated Trojans. Meanwhile, the Texas Longhorns had lost only one game as well - to the #2 and undefeated Oklahoma Sooners. In the 2004 NCAA Division I-A football rankings on November 27, Cal was in the #4 BCS position and Texas was #5. Texas remained idle the next Saturday, but Cal had defeated the Southern Mississippi Golden Eagles in a makeup game from Hurricane Ivan on December 4. Going into the game, the Golden Bears were made aware that while margin of victory did not affect computer rankings, it did affect human polls and just eight voters changing their vote could affect the final standings. In a dramatic twist, Texas, who had been left out of the BCS the year before because of the Oklahoma loss in the Big 12 championship, got enough voters to change their mind in the final vote and more computer points to slide into the BCS #4 slot. When the December 4 rankings came out, Texas was in the #4 BCS position and Cal was in the #5 position. Texas edged California out of the #4 spot by a mere .0102 points. The final poll positions had been unchanged with Cal at #4 AP, #4 coaches, and #6 computers polls and Texas at #6 AP, #5 coaches, and #4 computer polls.

=== Michigan Wolverines ===
A 28-20 loss at Notre Dame took the Wolverines out of contention for the BCS championship. They went through the Big Ten schedule, playing close games except for a 42-20 blowout of the Northwestern Wildcats. In the Michigan-Ohio State rivalry game, the Buckeyes defeated the Wolverines 37-21. Iowa and Michigan shared the Big Ten Conference title with identical 7-1 records. A 30-17 Michigan win over Iowa on September 25 ultimately decided the conference's Rose Bowl participant. Michigan was awarded the traditional Big Ten Rose Bowl selection by virtue of the victory in head-to-head competition over Iowa.

=== Texas Longhorns ===
Texas lost only one game, to the 2004 Oklahoma Sooners football team. In the Big 12 South division, this meant that Oklahoma would face Colorado in the Big 12 Championship Game. Oklahoma was invited to the National Championship game. Because the Longhorns were not conference champions, their next bowl game would be arbitrarily picked, and the outcome heavily depended on the play of other teams. Texas would eventually gain an automatic bid to a BCS bowl game by virtue of its #4 BCS ranking (the top four BCS teams are guaranteed spots in a BCS bowl game if the first three teams are conference champions). As USC was participating in the Orange Bowl (that year's BCS Championship Game), the Longhorns were chosen to play in "The Granddaddy of 'em All" by the Tournament of Roses Rose Bowl Committee as an at-large team.

== Game summary ==
The scoring was even 14-14 at halftime. The second half began with quarterback Vince Young scoring on the Wolverines with a 60-yard touchdown run. Michigan held a 10-point lead in the third quarter. Both teams traded scores and it looked as though Michigan would take the game with a late go-ahead field goal in the fourth quarter. But enough time remained for Texas to win. Driving 47 yards in ten plays, Texas had one final chance. Dusty Mangum's 37-yard field goal wobbled through the uprights as time expired.

=== Scoring summary ===
#12/13 Michigan vs. #5/6 Texas
Rose Bowl

Team	1	2	3	4	Total
Michigan	0	14	17	6	37
• Texas	7	7	7	17	38

- Date: Saturday, January 1
- Location: Rose Bowl, Pasadena, California
- Game start: 2:00 P.M. PST
- Elapsed time: 3:35
- Game attendance: 93,468
- Referee: Dennis Hennigan
- TV announcers (ABC): Keith Jackson (Play-by-play), Dan Fouts (Color) & Todd Harris (Sideline)
- Source: ESPN

Scoring summary
1	1:41	TEX	Vince Young 20-yard run (Dusty Mangum kick)	TEX 7-0
2	12:08	MICH	Braylon Edwards 39-yard pass from Chad Henne (Garrett Rivas kick)	Tied 7-7
2	4:16	TEX	David Thomas 11-yard pass from Vince Young (Dusty Magnum kick)	TEX 14-7
2	0:20	MICH	Braylon Edwards 8-yard pass from Chad Henne (Garrett Rivas kick)	Tied 14-14
3	12:53	TEX	Vince Young 60-yard run (Dusty Magnum kick)	TEX 21-14
3	12:23	MICH	Steve Breaston 50-yard pass from Chad Henne (Garrett Rivas kick)	Tied 21-21
3	6:29	MICH	Braylon Edwards 9-yard pass from Chad Henne (Garrett Rivas kick)	MICH 28-21
3	2:35	MICH	Garrett Rivas 44-yard field goal	MICH 31-21
4	9:51	TEX	Vince Young 10-yard run (Dusty Mangum kick)	MICH 31-28
4	6:09	MICH	Garrett Rivas 32-yard field goal	MICH 34-28
4	4:56	TEX	Vince Young 23-yard run (Dusty Mangum kick)	TEX 35-34
4	3:04	MICH	Garrett Rivas 42-yard field goal	MICH 37-35
4	0:00	TEX	Dusty Mangum 37-yard field goal	TEX 38-37

==== First quarter ====
- Texas - Vince Young, 20-yard run (Dusty Mangum kick); 12 plays, 85 yards in 4:12 (Texas 7 - Michigan 0)

==== Second quarter ====
- Michigan - Braylon Edwards, 39-yard pass from Chad Henne (Garrett Rivas kick); 4 plays, 50 yards in 1:39 (Texas 7 - Michigan 7)
- Texas - David Thomas, 11-yard pass from Vince Young (Dusty Mangum kick); 13 plays, 58 yards in 7:52 (Texas 14 - Michigan 7)
- Michigan - Braylon Edwards, 8-yard pass from Chad Henne (Garrett Rivas, kick); 8 plays, 34 yards in 2:16, (Texas 14 - Michigan 14)

==== Third quarter ====
- Texas - Vince Young, 60-yard run (Dusty Mangum kick); 6 plays, 72 yards in 2:07 (Texas 21 - Michigan 14)
- Michigan - Steve Breaston, 50-yard pass from Chad Henne (Garrett Rivas kick); 3 plays, 50 yards in 0:30 (Texas 21 - Michigan 21)
- Michigan - Braylon Edwards, 9-yard pass from Chad Henne (Garrett Rivas kick); 10 plays, 77 yards in 4:21 (Texas 21 - Michigan 28)
- Michigan - Garrett Rivas, 44-yard field goal; 6 plays, 18 yards in 2:10 (Texas 21 - Michigan 31)

==== Fourth quarter ====
- Texas - Vince Young, 10-yard run (Dusty Mangum kick); 7 plays, 50 yards in 3:08 (Texas 28 - Michigan 31)
- Michigan - Garrett Rivas, 32-yard field goal; 10 plays, 60 yards in 3:42 (Texas 28 - Michigan 34)
- Texas - Vince Young, 23-yard run (Dusty Mangum kick); 3 plays, 69 yards in 1:13 (Texas 35 - Michigan 34)
- Michigan - Garrett Rivas, 42-yard field goal; 5 plays, 18 yards in 1:52 (Texas 35 - Michigan 37)
- Texas - Dusty Mangum, 37-yard field goal; 10 plays, 47 yards in 3:04 (Texas 38 - Michigan 37)

== Aftermath ==
Texas coach Mack Brown was criticized for publicly politicking voters to put Texas ahead of California. Cal coach Jeff Tedford called for coaches' votes to be made public. California's cause was hurt when it was less than impressive in a 26-16 victory over Southern Miss in Hattiesburg, Mississippi the night before bowl bids were extended. This game was rescheduled from September due to Hurricane Ivan. Weakening Cal's cause after the fact was its 45-31 loss to Texas Tech University in the 2004 Holiday Bowl. Cal played without two of the highest performing receivers in the NCAA, however, this loss was attributed in many press reports to the Bears' disappointment over being denied their first Rose Bowl appearance in 45 years.

The Associated Press, as a result of two consecutive seasons of BCS controversy, pulled its poll out of the BCS formula. The AP poll was replaced by the Harris poll, and the AP continues to give out its own national-championship trophy.

Texas won 38–37 after Dusty Mangum kicked a field goal as time expired. Several participants, including Vince Young, Braylon Edwards, Steve Breaston, Chad Henne and LaMarr Woodley, later played in the National Football League.

This win set the stage for Texas to return to the Rose Bowl for the BCS Championship in the 2006 Rose Bowl. Vince Young would be the Offensive MVP for a second consecutive year.
