= Kevin Dudley =

American football player (born 1982)

No. 41
- Position: Fullback

Personal information
- Born: January 2, 1982 (age 44); Oxford, Ohio, U.S.
- Listed height: 6 ft 0 in (1.83 m)
- Listed weight: 238 lb (108 kg)

Career information
- College: Michigan
- NFL draft: 2005: undrafted

Career history
- Atlanta Falcons (2005–2006); New Orleans Saints (2006–2008)*
- * Offseason or practice squad member only
- Stats at Pro Football Reference

Lawrence Kevin Dudley (born January 2, 1982) is an American former professional football player who was a fullback in the National Football League (NFL). He played college football for the Michigan Wolverines and was signed by the Atlanta Falcons as an undrafted free agent in 2005.

== Early life ==
Dudley attended Franklin County High School in Brookville, Indiana, and played running back as well as linebacker. In his career, he carried the ball 525 times for 3,296 yards and 45 touchdowns.

== College career ==
Dudley played college football at the University of Michigan. He was the starting fullback for his final two years with the Wolverines. In his career, he rushed the ball 3 times for a total of 13 yards and had 5 receptions for a total of 32 yards with no touchdowns. He was a 2005 Outstanding Sportsmanship Award Winner.
