= 2005 Capital One Bowl =

American college football game

| LSU Tigers | Iowa Hawkeyes |
| (9–2) | (9–2) |
| SEC | Big Ten |
| 25 | 30 |
| Head coach: Nick Saban | Head coach: Kirk Ferentz |
| AP / Coaches / BCS; 12 / 11 / 11 | AP / Coaches / BCS; 11 / 13 / 12 |
| | 1 | 2 | 3 | 4 | Total |
|---|---|---|---|---|---|
| LSU | 0 | 12 | 0 | 13 | 25 |
| Iowa | 7 | 7 | 3 | 13 | 30 |
- Date: January 1, 2005
- Season: 2004
- Stadium: Florida Citrus Bowl
- Location: Orlando, Florida
- MVP: Drew Tate (Iowa QB)
- Favorite: LSU by 7
- Referee: Hal Dowden (Big XII)
- Attendance: 70,229

United States TV coverage
- Network: ABC
- Announcers: Gary Thorne (play-by-play); Ed Cunningham (analyst); Jerry Punch (sidelines)

The 2005 Capital One Bowl was a post-season college football bowl game between the Iowa Hawkeyes and the LSU Tigers on January 1, 2005, at the Citrus Bowl in Orlando, Florida. Spread bettors favored LSU by seven points, but Iowa won, 30–25, when quarterback Drew Tate completed a 56-yard pass to wide receiver Warren Holloway for a touchdown as time expired. The game was part of the 2004 college football season and was the concluding game of the season for both teams.

Prior to the game, LSU head coach Nick Saban announced that he was leaving LSU to become the head coach for the Miami Dolphins. Iowa coach Kirk Ferentz also drew attention from NFL teams, but ultimately signed a contract extension through 2012. Saban and Ferentz worked together in 1993 and 1994 as assistants to Bill Belichick with the Cleveland Browns.

The game had 70,229 fans in attendance; Tate was named the game's Most Valuable Player.

LSU became the first defending BCS national champion to lose a non-BCS bowl the following year by losing this game.

== Teams ==
The game was played between the LSU Tigers of the Southeastern Conference and the Iowa Hawkeyes of the Big Ten Conference. It was the first meeting between the two programs.

=== LSU Tigers ===
LSU entered the bowl with a 9–2 record (6–2 in conference). The Tigers won their final six regular season games after suffering losses to Auburn and Georgia in a three-week stretch.

=== Iowa Hawkeyes ===
Iowa entered the bowl with a 9–2 record (7–1 in conference). The Hawkeyes were co-Big Ten champions with Michigan; however, the Wolverines were granted the Big Ten's automatic BCS bid due to their 30–17 victory over Iowa on September 25, 2004.

== Game summary ==
=== Scoring summary ===
Scoring summary

| Quarter | Time | Drive | | | Team | Scoring information | Score | |
| Quarter | Time | Plays | Yards | TOP | Team | Scoring information | LSU | IOWA |
|---|---|---|---|---|---|---|---|---|
| 1 | 12:42 | 6 | 69 | 2:18 | IOWA | Clinton Solomon 57-yard touchdown reception from Drew Tate, Kyle Schlicher kick good | 0 | 7 |
| 2 | 14:51 | 6 | 19 | 1:55 | LSU | 29-yard field goal by Chris Jackson | 3 | 7 |
| 2 | 9:26 | 7 | 15 | 2:52 | LSU | 47-yard field goal by Chris Jackson | 6 | 7 |
| 2 | 1:04 | | | | IOWA | Blocked punt returned 7 yards for touchdown by Sean Considine, Kyle Schlicher kick good | 6 | 14 |
| 2 | 0:38 | 1 | 74 | 0:26 | LSU | Alley Broussard 74-yard touchdown run, Chris Jackson kick failed | 12 | 14 |
| 3 | 9:59 | 12 | 60 | 1:59 | IOWA | 19-yard field goal by Kyle Schlicher | 12 | 17 |
| 4 | 12:48 | 10 | 72 | 4:30 | IOWA | Marques Simmons 4-yard touchdown run, Kyle Schlicher kick good | 12 | 24 |
| 4 | 8:21 | 11 | 74 | 4:27 | LSU | Skyler Green 22-yard touchdown reception from JaMarcus Russell, Chris Jackson kick good | 19 | 24 |
| 4 | 0:46 | 12 | 69 | 4:20 | LSU | Skyler Green 3-yard touchdown reception from JaMarcus Russell, 2-point pass failed | 25 | 24 |
| 4 | 0:00 | 3 | 71 | 0:46 | IOWA | Warren Holloway 56-yard touchdown reception from Drew Tate, Kyle Schlicher kick not attempted | 25 | 30 |
| "TOP" = time of possession. For other American football terms, see Glossary of American football. | | | | | | | 25 | 30 |

=== Statistics ===
| Statistics | LSU | IOWA |
|---|---|---|
| First downs | 19 | 16 |
| Plays–yards | 71–346 | 61–334 |
| Rushes–yards | 36–118 | 29–47 |
| Passing yards | 228 | 287 |
| Passing: comp–att–int | 23–35–1 | 20–32–2 |
| Time of possession | 34:12 | 25:48 |

| Team | Category | Player | Statistics |
|---|---|---|---|
| LSU | Passing | JaMarcus Russell | 12/15, 128 yds, 2 TD |
| LSU | Rushing | Alley Broussard | 13 car, 109 yds, 1 TD |
| LSU | Receiving | Dwayne Bowe | 8 rec, 122 yds |
| Iowa | Passing | Drew Tate | 20/32, 287 yds, 2 TD, 2 INT |
| Iowa | Rushing | Marques Simmons | 13 car, 35 yds, 1 TD |
| Iowa | Receiving | Ed Hinkel | 10 rec, 93 yds |

In total yardage, the teams were fairly equal; LSU had 346 yards (71 plays) to Iowa's 334 (61 plays). The Tigers held advantages many statistical categories, such as first downs, rushing yards, turnovers and time of possession. The Hawkeyes held the advantage in passing yards, 287–228.

Tate was the game's leading passer, throwing for all 287 of Iowa's passing yards. JaMarcus Russell was LSU's leading passer, throwing for 128 yards and two touchdowns, both to Skyler Green. Iowa's Jonathan Babineaux led the game in sacks, with three. Babineaux also led the game in tackles for loss, with 4.5. LSU intercepted Tate twice during the game; Marcus Randall was intercepted once by the Hawkeyes. Both teams fumbled the ball once, though neither time was the ball recovered by the other team.

In special teams play, Iowa's David Bradley punted the ball six times for 295 yards, a 49.2-yard average. LSU's Chris Jackson punted the ball four times for 181 yards, a 45.2-yard average. Jackson was also two-for-two in field goal kicking; Iowa's Kyle Schlicher was one-for-one in that regard. Green had the game's longest return of any kind, taking a kickoff return 58 yards.

LSU and Iowa next met in the 2014 Outback Bowl. The Tigers evened the series with a 21-14 victory.

Saban finished his five-year tenure at LSU 48-16. He returned to college football, and the SEC, two years after this game by accepting the head coaching position at Alabama. The Crimson Tide are 2-0 in the Capital One/Citrus Bowl under Saban, defeating Michigan State 49-7 in 2011 and Michigan 35-16 in 2020.

Two days after the game, LSU named Oklahoma State coach Les Miles to succeed Saban. Miles went 114-34 at LSU over 11-plus seasons, highlighted by a national championship in 2007. Miles' Tigers lost the 2010 game to Penn State 19-17. The Tigers won the December 2016 game 29-9 over Louisville, lost the 2018 game 21-17 to Notre Dame under coach Ed Orgeron, and won the 2023 game 63-7 vs. Purdue under coach Brian Kelly, who led the Fighting Irish to victory vs. the Tigers five years earlier.

Iowa next appeared in this bowl when they faced Tennessee in the January 2024 edition.
