= Alley Broussard =

American football player (born 1983)

No. 22
- Position: Running back

Personal information
- Born: September 6, 1983 (age 43); Lafayette, Louisiana, U.S.
- Listed height: 6 ft 0 in (1.83 m)
- Listed weight: 250 lb (113 kg)

Career information
- High school: Acadiana (Scott, Louisiana)
- College: LSU (2003–2006); Missouri Southern State (2007)

Awards and highlights
- BCS national champion (2003)

Alley Joseph Broussard III (born September 6, 1983) is an American former college football running back for the LSU Tigers and the Missouri Southern Lions. He was a part of LSU's 2003 team that won the BCS National Championship. Against Ole Miss in 2004, Broussard rushed for 250 yards, setting the LSU single-game rushing record. The record stood until 2016, when it was surpassed by a 284-yard performance from Leonard Fournette, also against Ole Miss.

== Early life ==
Broussard was born in Lafayette, Louisiana to Alley Jr. and Liz Broussard. He played football at Acadiana High School in Scott, Louisiana. In 2001, he rushed for a school single-game record 321 yards against New Iberia, and in 2002 set school records with six touchdowns and 36 points against Carencro. He rushed for 2,252 yards and 25 touchdowns as a junior and 1,910 yards and 27 touchdowns as a senior. Broussard was rated by Rivals.com as the fourth best running back prospect in the nation for the class of 2003.

== College career ==
=== LSU ===
Broussard committed to play football for Louisiana State University. During the majority of his career, he split playing time at LSU with running backs Joseph Addai and Justin Vincent. As a freshman in 2003, Broussard had 85 carries for 389 yards and four touchdowns on the season. In the tenth game of the 2004 season, in a 27–24 win over Ole Miss, Broussard rushed for 250 yards on 26 carries and had three touchdowns. His 250 rushing yards set an LSU single-game record, since surpassed several times. He finished the season with 142 carries for 867 yards and ten touchdowns. He had 109 yards in LSU's Capital One Bowl loss to Iowa, including a 74-yard touchdown run.

He suffered a knee injury during fall practice the following year, which kept him out for the entire 2005 season after a setback due to an infection after surgery. He received a medical redshirt allowing him an extra year of college football eligibility. He struggled early in the 2006 season and was not able to establish himself in the starting lineup. His most productive game that season was in week six against Fresno State, as he had five carries for 67 yards and a touchdown. He finished the season with 74 carries for 281 yards and four touchdowns. Broussard left the LSU football team during the summer before the 2007 season, stating "My heart is no longer in it." He ended his LSU career with 1,537 rushing yards and 18 touchdowns over three seasons.

=== Missouri Southern ===
Broussard was soon contacted by a number of lower-division schools, among them North Alabama and Arkansas Tech. A month later he transferred to Missouri Southern State University to play for the Missouri Southern Lions of Division II. After sitting out the first game of the 2007 season against Haskell Indian Nations University, he came into the game in the second half against Harding in week two and rushed for 110 yards and a touchdown. It was his most yards rushing in a game since his 250-yard game in November 2004. "It feels so good," said Broussard. "Just tell everyone I'm back—everything's back."

== Later life ==
In March 2008, Broussard was allowed to attend LSU's pro day in preparation for the 2008 NFL draft. He ran a 4.75-second 40-yard dash, did 21 bench press repetitions, and had a 28 and a half inch vertical jump. He was not drafted and did not play professionally. He returned to his hometown Lafayette, where he lives as of 2016 with his daughter and fiancee.

== See also ==
- LSU Tigers football statistical leaders
