= Dwayne Bowe =

American football player (born 1984)

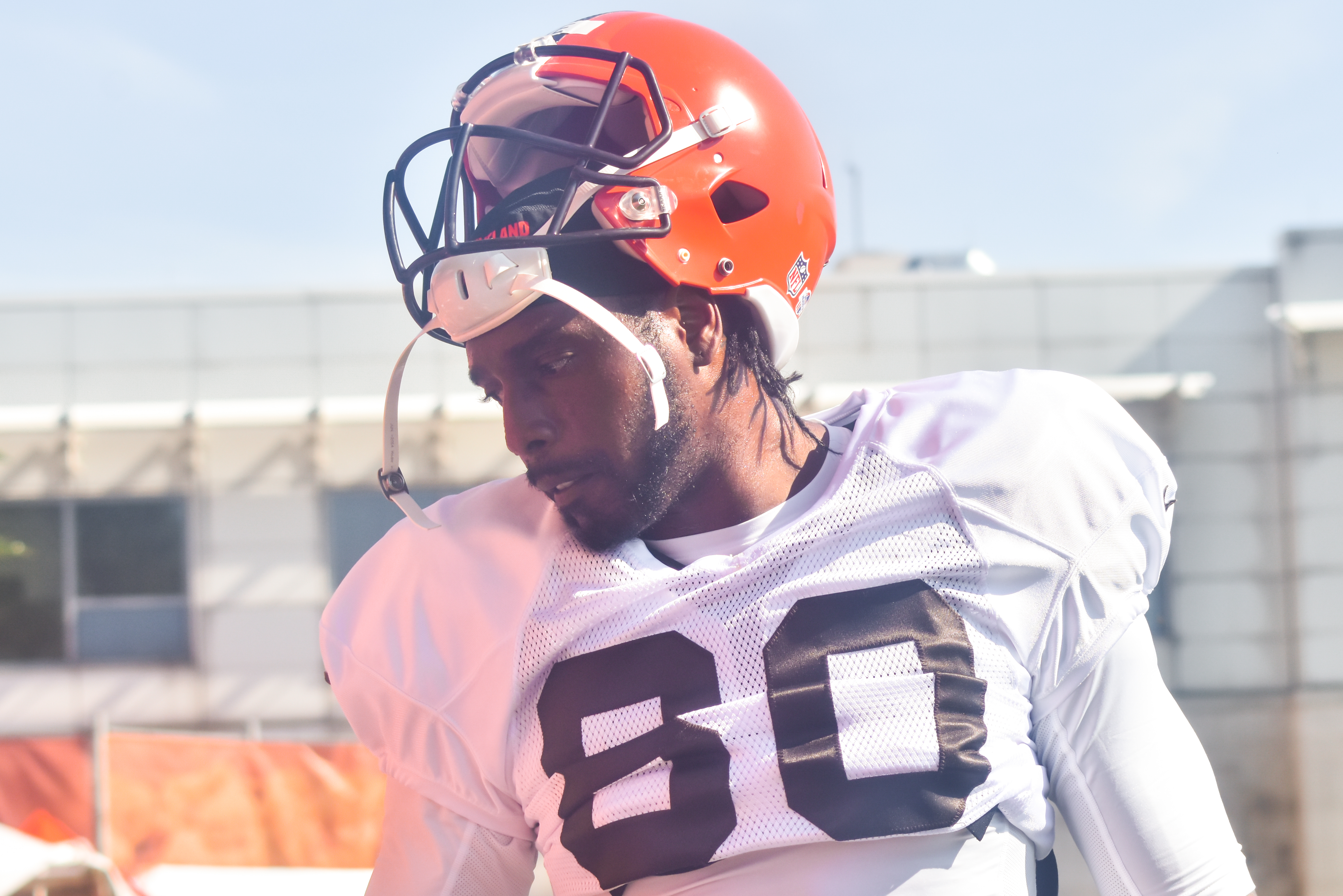
- Bowe with the Cleveland Browns in 2015

No. 82, 80
- Position: Wide receiver

Personal information
- Born: September 21, 1984 (age 42); Miami, Florida, U.S.
- Listed height: 6 ft 2 in (1.88 m)
- Listed weight: 222 lb (101 kg)

Career information
- High school: Miami Norland (Miami Gardens, Florida)
- College: LSU (2003–2006)
- NFL draft: 2007: 1st round, 23rd overall pick

Career history
- Kansas City Chiefs (2007–2014); Cleveland Browns (2015)

Awards and highlights
- Second-team All-Pro (2010); Pro Bowl (2010); NFL receiving touchdowns leader (2010); PFWA All-Rookie Team (2007); BCS national champion (2003); First-team All-SEC (2006)

Career NFL statistics
- Receptions: 537
- Receiving yards: 7,208
- Receiving touchdowns: 44
- Stats at Pro Football Reference

Dwayne Lorenzo Bowe (born September 21, 1984) is an American former professional football player who was a wide receiver for nine seasons in the National Football League (NFL). He played college football for the LSU Tigers, and was selected by the Kansas City Chiefs in the first round of the 2007 NFL draft. He played for the Chiefs from 2007 to 2014. He led the NFL in receiving touchdowns with 15 in 2010, earning Pro Bowl and Second-team All-Pro honors. He also played for the Cleveland Browns in 2015.

== Early life ==
Bowe and his older brother were raised by their paternal grandparents in Miami, Florida. He was not involved in sports until his junior year in high school, when Bowe decided to join the high school football team at Miami Norland High School.

== College career ==
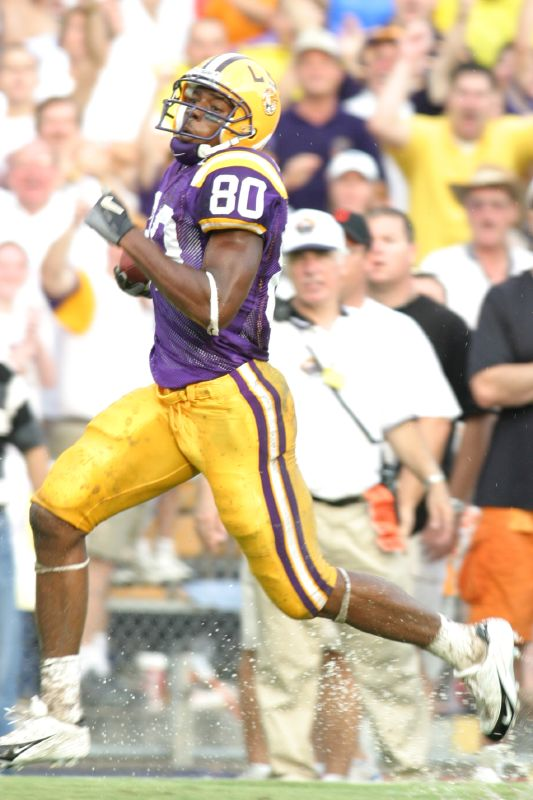
Bowe with the LSU Tigers

Bowe accepted an offer from Nick Saban to play football for Louisiana State University. He ranks among LSU's all-time best wide receivers, at one point holding the school's single-season record for touchdown receptions. (He has since been passed by Ja'Marr Chase, Justin Jefferson, and Terrace Marshall Jr. in 2019.) Bowe appeared in 13 games as a backup for the Tigers' 2003 BCS national championship team. His sophomore year at LSU was his breakout season. After the departure of wide receivers Michael Clayton and Devery Henderson to the NFL, Bowe was poised to become a starter for the Tigers. In the opening game of the year versus Oregon State, Bowe caught a pass from Jamarcus Russell for a 38-yard touchdown strike that sent the game into overtime. The Tigers won that game, and Bowe finished second on the team in receiving yards while becoming one of Russell's favorite targets along with Skyler Green, Early Doucet, and Craig "Buster" Davis. In his junior season (2005), Bowe led the team in receptions, averaging 17.3 yards per catch and setting an LSU record by catching a touchdown pass in seven straight games. Bowe caught the game winner versus Alabama that year, giving LSU a 16–13 OT win in Tuscaloosa. Bowe's senior season (2006) was his best yet. Not only did he lead the team in receptions (65 receptions for 990 yards), he also set another LSU school record with 12 touchdown catches on the year. Bowe led a trio of receivers including Doucet and Davis that combined for 180 catches, 2,598 yards, and 24 touchdowns.

== Professional career ==
=== Pre-draft ===
Regarded as one of the top wide receivers available in the 2007 NFL draft, Bowe drew comparisons to Hines Ward.

Pre-draft measurables
Height	Weight	Arm length	Hand span	40-yard dash	10-yard split	20-yard split	20-yard shuttle	Three-cone drill	Vertical jump	Broad jump
6 ft 2 1/4 in (1.89 m)	221 lb (100 kg)	34 1/4 in (0.87 m)	9 5/8 in (0.24 m)	4.57 s	1.64 s	2.69 s	4.35 s	6.81 s	33 in (0.84 m)	10 ft 5 in (3.18 m)
All values from NFL Combine

=== Kansas City Chiefs ===
==== 2007 season ====
He was selected in the first round with the 23rd overall pick by the Kansas City Chiefs. Alongside his former teammates JaMarcus Russell and Buster Davis, the trio became the first quarterback/wide receiving group to be selected in the first round of the draft. On August 5, 2007, Bowe signed a five-year contract with the Chiefs, after holding out the first week of practice at training camp.

Bowe scored on a pass from Damon Huard in the first half of the game against the Chicago Bears on September 16, 2007.

In his rookie season, Bowe led all first-year receivers in receptions (70), yards (995), and touchdowns (6). His reception and yardage totals set franchise records for Chiefs' rookie receivers. Bowe also set the team's single-game rookie receiving record with 164 yards against the San Diego Chargers on September 30, 2007.

==== 2008 season ====
In the season opener of the 2008 season, Bowe recorded five receptions for eighty–nine yards, but he also dropped 4 passes, including a game–winning catch in the endzone on first and goal. He went on to obtain 1,022 yards receiving and ended the season 4th in the NFL with 86 receptions. In his last game of the 2008 season Bowe gained 103 yards with 10 receptions in a loss to the Bengals.

==== 2009 season ====
Playing with new quarterback Matt Cassel, Bowe finished the season with 589 receiving yards and four touchdowns in 11 games. On November 17, 2009, Bowe was suspended for 4 games for violation of the NFL's substance abuse policy, after he tested positive for a diuretic.

==== 2010 season ====
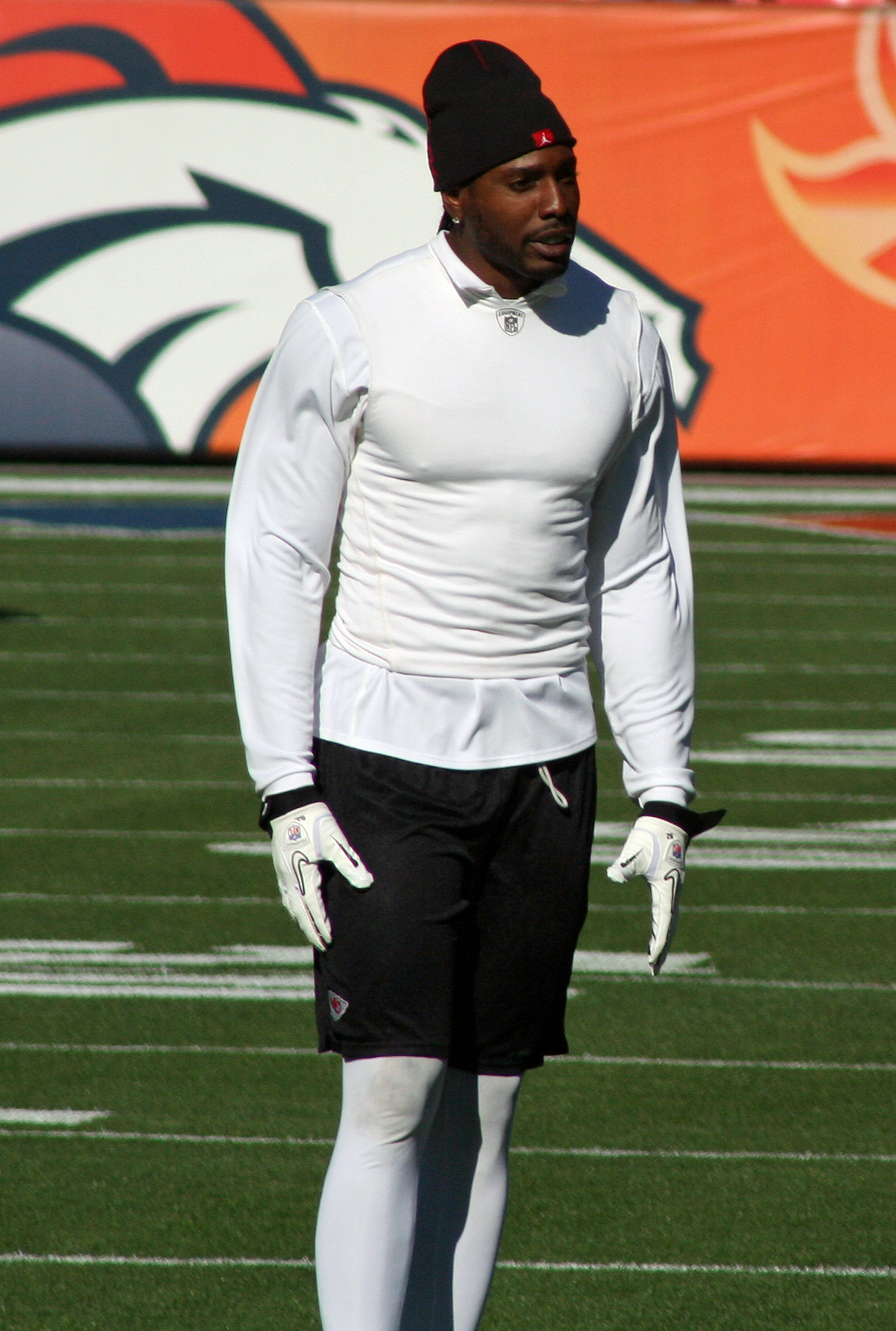
Bowe playing for the Chiefs in 2010.

Bowe got off to a slow start in Chiefs' 2010 campaign, catching only 9 passes in the team's first 4 games. In the Chiefs' fourth game against the Indianapolis Colts, Bowe dropped crucial passes including one in the endzone which would have given them the lead, as the Chiefs' suffered their first loss 9–19. On October 17, 2010, Bowe caught 6 passes for 108 yards and 2 touchdowns against the Houston Texans in a game that the Chiefs lost 31–35. The following week was prolific for Bowe once again, as he hauled in 3 receptions for 81 yards and 2 touchdowns in a 42–20 win over the Jacksonville Jaguars. In Week 8 against the Buffalo Bills he caught 3 passes for only 16 yards but again found the endzone, helping his team win against the Buffalo Bills, 13–10. In Week 9's match-up with the Oakland Raiders he caught 5 passes for 63 yards, adding another touchdown as well. The Chiefs went on to lose the game in overtime, 20–23. On November 14, 2010, almost a year after his drug suspension, Bowe set new career-highs for receptions and receiving yards in a single game versus the Denver Broncos. As the Broncos took a 35–0 lead, the Chiefs were forced to air it out. Bowe was targeted 18 times and caught 13 passes for 186 yards. He had 2 touchdowns as well. That was Bowe's fifth straight game with a touchdown reception. The Chiefs lost the game, 29–49. In Week 11, against the struggling Arizona Cardinals Bowe extended his streak to six straight games with a touchdown, this time coming up with 2. That set a team record for most games with a touchdown catch. He finished the game with 6 receptions for 109 yards and helped his team en route to a 31–13 win. The following week, in the first half against the Seattle Seahawks Bowe caught 8 passes while gaining 120 yards. Two of the receptions went for touchdowns. In the second half, he added five more receptions, including his third touchdown of the game. He extended his streak to 7 straight games with a score, thus breaking the Kansas City Chiefs franchise record of 6 straight games with a touchdown. Bowe also broke the Chiefs' franchise record for most touchdowns in a single season during the game against the Seattle Seahawks in week 12. He was invited to the 2011 Pro Bowl. He was also named a Second-team All-Pro by the Associated Press. He was ranked 45th by his fellow players on the NFL Top 100 Players of 2011.

==== 2011 season ====
Bowe had three games going over the 100-yard mark in the 2011 season. He finished the 2011 season with 81 receptions, 1,159 receiving yards, and 5 receiving touchdowns.

==== 2012 season ====
On March 5, 2012, the Chiefs placed a non-exclusive franchise tag on Bowe. On August 17, Bowe signed a 1-year, $9.5 million tender, ending a lengthy holdout. In Week 14, Bowe injured his ribs while making a block, and on December 14, the Chiefs placed Bowe on injured reserve.

In the 2012 season, Bowe had 59 receptions for 801 receiving yards and three receiving touchdowns in 13 games.

==== 2013 season ====
On March 4, 2013, Bowe signed a five-year contract. Ian Rapoport of NFL.com reported that Bowe became the NFL's third highest-paid wide receiver in terms of total compensation on his contract. His deal was for $56 million over five years and included $26 million in guaranteed money plus a $15 million signing bonus, according to someone who had seen the deal. In year one, Bowe earned $16 million with a base salary of $750,000 and a workout bonus of $250,000. In the first three years, Bowe would have earned $36 million.

In the 2013 season, Bowe had 57 receptions for 673 receiving yards and five receiving touchdowns in 15 games. He had eight receptions for 150 receiving yards and a touchdown in the 45–44 loss to the Indianapolis Colts in the Wild Card Round.

==== 2014 season ====
On August 15, 2014, the NFL announced Bowe would be suspended for one game. Bowe served his suspension in the Chiefs first game of the season against the Tennessee Titans on September 7, but was allowed to play in the preseason. The suspension was a result of his arrest for possession of a controlled substance on November 10, 2013. On November 2, 2014, against the New York Jets, Bowe caught his 500th pass. In the 2014 season, Bowe recorded 60 receptions for 754 receiving yards in 15 games.

The Chiefs released Bowe on March 12, 2015, after eight seasons with the team.

=== Cleveland Browns ===
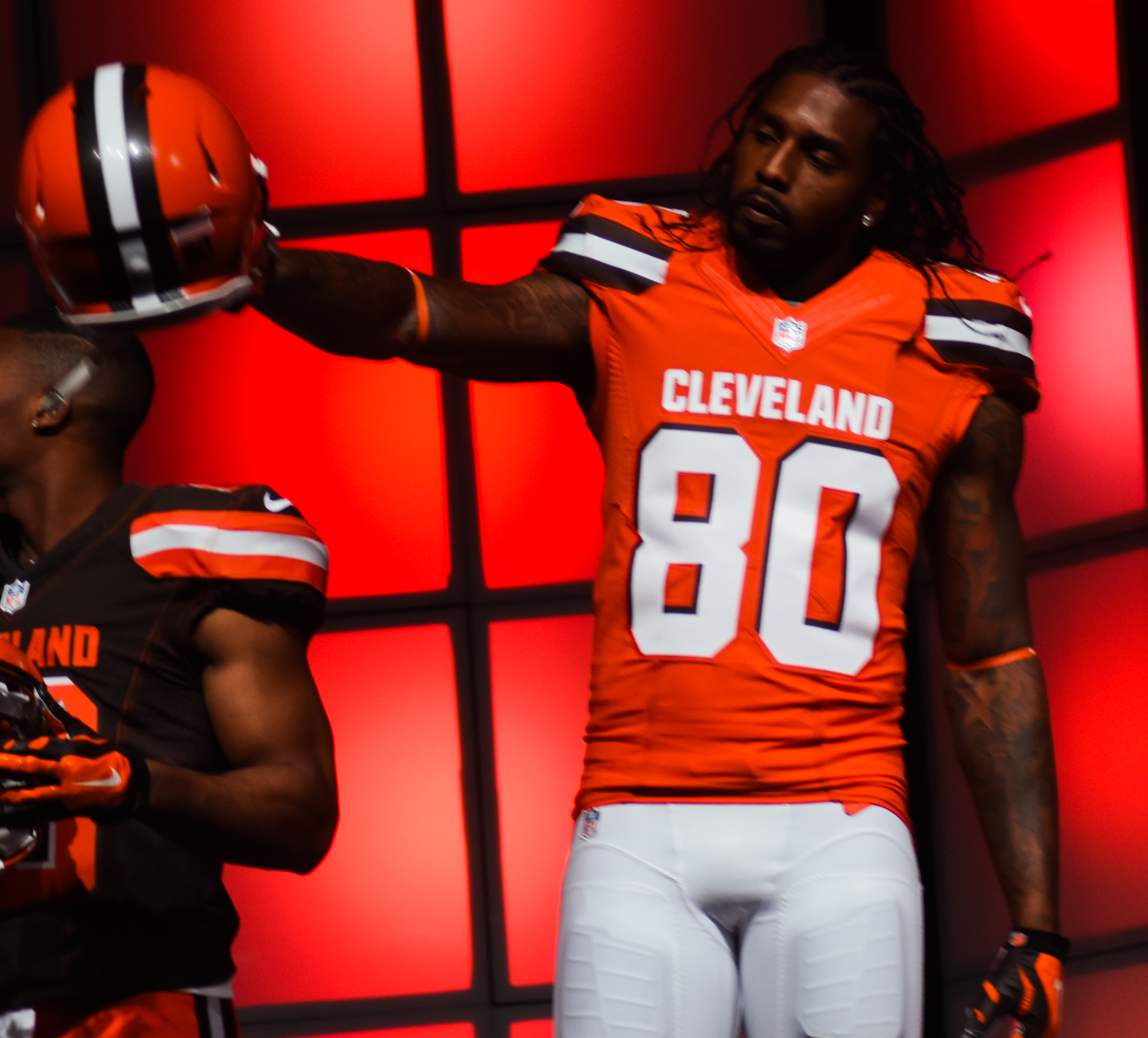
Bowe at the Browns showcase of their new jerseys

On March 19, 2015, Bowe was signed to a two-year contract from the Cleveland Browns for up to $13 million and $9 million guaranteed.

Although Browns general manager Ray Farmer signed Bowe during the offseason, head coach Mike Pettine chose not to use him throughout the season, saying he was not among the top four receivers on the team. Bowe made his Browns debut during a Week 2 matchup against the Tennessee Titans but was held without a catch. He did not make a reception until Week 9 at the Cincinnati Bengals. He finished the game with a season-high 3 catches for 31 yards. During his first season with the Browns, Bowe appeared in only 7 contests, had 5 catches, and no starts. Throughout the season, he was deactivated for most games and the fourth or fifth receiver on the depth chart behind Travis Benjamin, Brian Hartline, Taylor Gabriel, and Andrew Hawkins. Bowe's effort and commitment to play football came into question throughout the entire season.

The Browns released Bowe on March 16, 2016.

=== Retirement ===
Bowe officially announced his retirement on May 16, 2019, after signing a one-day ceremonial contract with the Chiefs.

== NFL career statistics ==
Year	Team	Games		Receiving					Rushing					Fumbles	
Year	Team	GP	GS	Rec	Yds	Avg	Lng	TD	Att	Yds	Avg	Lng	TD	Fum	Lost
2007	KC	16	15	70	995	14.2	58	5	—	—	—	—	—	0	0
2008	KC	16	16	86	1,022	11.9	36	7	—	—	—	—	—	0	0
2009	KC	11	9	47	589	12.5	41	4	—	—	—	—	—	1	0
2010	KC	16	16	72	1,162	16.1	75T	15	1	4	4.0	4	0	1	0
2011	KC	16	13	81	1,159	14.3	52T	5	1	12	12.0	12	0	1	0
2012	KC	13	12	59	801	13.6	47	3	—	—	—	—	—	1	1
2013	KC	15	15	57	673	11.8	34	5	—	—	—	—	—	0	0
2014	KC	15	15	60	754	12.6	37	0	—	—	—	—	—	2	0
2015	CLE	7	0	5	53	10.6	16	0	—	—	—	—	—	0	0
Total		125	111	537	7,208	13.4	75	44	2	16	8.0	12	0	6	1

== See also ==
- LSU Tigers football statistical leaders
