= 2004 Iowa Hawkeyes football team =

American college football season

2004 Iowa Hawkeyes football

Big Ten co-champion Capital One Bowl champion

Capital One Bowl, W 30–25 vs. LSU
- Conference: Big Ten Conference

Ranking
- Coaches: No. 8
- AP: No. 8
- Record: 10–2 (7–1 Big Ten)
- Head coach: Kirk Ferentz (6th season)
- Offensive coordinator: Ken O'Keefe (6th season)
- Offensive scheme: Pro-style
- Defensive coordinator: Norm Parker (6th season)
- Base defense: 4–3
- Home stadium: Kinnick Stadium (Capacity: 70,397)

2004 Big Ten Conference football standings
	Conf.			Overall
Team	W		L	W		L
No. 14 Michigan $+	7	–	1	9	–	3
No. 8 Iowa +	7	–	1	10	–	2
No. 17 Wisconsin	6	–	2	9	–	3
Northwestern	5	–	3	6	–	6
No. 20 Ohio State	4	–	4	8	–	4
Purdue	4	–	4	7	–	5
Michigan State	4	–	4	5	–	7
Minnesota	3	–	5	7	–	5
Penn State	2	–	6	4	–	7
Illinois	1	–	7	3	–	8
Indiana	1	–	7	3	–	8
$ – BCS representative as conference champion; + – Conference co-champions; Rankings from AP Poll

The 2004 Iowa Hawkeyes football team represented the University of Iowa in the 2004 NCAA Division I-A football season. They played their home games in Kinnick Stadium and were coached by Kirk Ferentz. Finishing the 2003 season with a 10–3 record and an Outback Bowl victory, the Hawkeyes began the season 2–0 with wins over Kent State and Iowa State. But after rocky performances at Arizona State and Michigan, the Hawkeyes sat at 2–2 going into their game with Michigan State.

The Hawkeyes handily defeated the Spartans 38–16, and turned their attention to Ohio State, a team whom the Hawkeyes had not beaten at home since 1983. Behind a strong defensive performance that allowed only 177 yards, the Hawkeyes easily defeated the Buckeyes by 26 points, the largest margin of victory over Ohio State in Iowa history at the time. However, tragedy struck soon thereafter, when head coach Kirk Ferentz's father died. In the emotional game that ensued, the Hawkeyes narrowly defeated Penn State 6–4 on two Kyle Schlicher field goals.

The Hawkeyes then raised their record to 8–2 with victories over Illinois, Purdue, and Minnesota. With a share of the Big Ten championship on the line, the Hawkeyes met Wisconsin in the final regular season game of the year. Iowa won the game, completing its second consecutive unbeaten season at home, and thousands of Hawkeye fans swarmed the field in celebration. Several weeks following the victory, Iowa accepted a bid to play the LSU Tigers in the 2005 Capital One Bowl.

In a game that was originally thought to be a defensive matchup, the Hawkeyes took a 24–12 lead early in the fourth quarter. But behind freshman quarterback JaMarcus Russell, the Tigers stormed back, and took a one-point lead with 46 seconds remaining. However, LSU's comeback was all for naught, as Iowa's Drew Tate completed a 56-yard touchdown pass to Warren Holloway as time expired, giving Iowa the 30–25 win and a 10–2 final record.

== Before the season ==
Prior to the season, the Hawkeyes looked to replace seven offensive starters and four defensive starters. Key losses from 2003 included Maurice Brown, Robert Gallery, Nate Chandler, Fred Russell, and Ramon Ochoa on offense. Defensively, the Hawkeyes looked to replace Howard Hodges, Jared Clauss, Grant Steen, and Bob Sanders.

Replacement starters on offense were Drew Tate, Champ Davis, Jermelle Lewis, Calvin Davis, Tony Jackson, Lee Gray, Mike Elgin, and Chris Felder. On defense, Derreck Robinson, Tyler Luebke, George Lewis, and Marcus Paschal assumed their roles on the starting lineup. On special teams, David Bradley returned for his senior season as punter, while Kyle Schlicher replaced Nate Kaeding as the starting kicker.

=== Preseason Rankings ===
- NationalChamps.net – 12th
- USA today – 12th
- SI.com – 15th
- AP top 25 – 19th

=== Recruiting class ===
Iowa signed 21 players on National Signing Day, which was February 4, 2004. The Hawkeyes added other late commits to the class with the late additions of defensive lineman Ettore Ewen .

Another recruit, Kyle Williams, later de-committed from the Hawkeyes and committed to the Purdue Boilermakers.

College recruiting information
Name	Hometown	School	Height	Weight	40^{‡}	Commit date
Nyere Aumaitre; OL	Camden, NJ	Woodrow Wilson HS	6 ft 5 in (1.96 m)	300 lb (140 kg)	5.10	Jan 20, 2004
Nyere Aumaitre; OL	Recruit ratings: Scout: Rivals:					
Walner Belleus; CB	Immokalee, FL	Immokalee HS	5 ft 10 1/2 in (1.79 m)	177 1/2 lb (80.5 kg)	4.42	Dec 14, 2003
Walner Belleus; CB	Recruit ratings: Scout: Rivals:					
Ted Bentler; DE	Davenport, IA	Assumption HS	6 ft 4 in (1.93 m)	242 1/2 lb (110.0 kg)	4.675	Oct 5, 2002
Ted Bentler; DE	Recruit ratings: Scout: Rivals:					
Andy Brodell; WR	Ankeny, IA	Ankeny HS	6 ft 2 1/2 in (1.89 m)	182 1/2 lb (82.8 kg)	4.40	Sep 28, 2003
Andy Brodell; WR	Recruit ratings: Scout: Rivals:					
Lucas Cox; DE	Springdale, PA	Springdale JSHS	6 ft 4 in (1.93 m)	238 1/2 lb (108.2 kg)	4.815	Jan 16, 2004
Lucas Cox; DE	Recruit ratings: Scout: Rivals:					
Harold Dalton; S	Camden, NJ	Woodrow Wilson HS	6 ft 1 in (1.85 m)	183 1/2 lb (83.2 kg)	4.48	Oct 26, 2003
Harold Dalton; S	Recruit ratings: Scout: Rivals:					
Rashad Dunn; OG	Evans, GA	Greenbrier HS	6 ft 3 1/2 in (1.92 m)	270 lb (120 kg)	5.20	Jan 26, 2004
Rashad Dunn; OG	Recruit ratings: Scout: Rivals:					
Ettore Ewen; DT	Tampa, FL	Wharton HS	6 ft 0 in (1.83 m)	280 lb (130 kg)	4.80	Jul 8, 2004
Ettore Ewen; DT	Recruit ratings: No ratings found					
Bradley Fletcher; S	Youngstown, OH	Liberty HS	6 ft 2 in (1.88 m)	180 lb (82 kg)	4.50	Apr 19, 2003
Bradley Fletcher; S	Recruit ratings: Scout: Rivals:					
Charles Godfrey; CB	Baytown, TX	Lee HS	6 ft 1 1/2 in (1.87 m)	201 1/2 lb (91.4 kg)	4.54	Dec 15, 2003
Charles Godfrey; CB	Recruit ratings: Scout: Rivals:					
Shonn Greene; RB	Atco, NJ	Winslow Township HS	5 ft 11 in (1.80 m)	190 lb (86 kg)	4.465	Dec 14, 2003
Shonn Greene; RB	Recruit ratings: Scout: Rivals:					
Mitch King; LB	Burlington, IA	Burlington Comm. HS	6 ft 3 in (1.91 m)	230 lb (100 kg)	4.73	Apr 6, 2003
Mitch King; LB	Recruit ratings: Scout: Rivals:					
Matt Kroul; LB	Mount Vernon, IA	Mount Vernon HS	6 ft 2 in (1.88 m)	225 lb (102 kg)	4.75	Aug 13, 2002
Matt Kroul; LB	Recruit ratings: Scout: Rivals:					
Grant McCracken; DE	Ankeny, IA	Ankeny HS	6 ft 3 in (1.91 m)	215 lb (98 kg)	4.80	Jul 26, 2003
Grant McCracken; DE	Recruit ratings: Scout: Rivals:					
Brandon Myers; TE	Monroe, IA	PCM HS	6 ft 4 1/4 in (1.94 m)	212 1/2 lb (96.4 kg)	4.74	Feb 4, 2004
Brandon Myers; TE	Recruit ratings: Scout: Rivals:					
Anton Narinskiy; LB	Chagrin Falls, OH	Kenston HS	6 ft 4 in (1.93 m)	220 lb (100 kg)	4.60	Dec 3, 2003
Anton Narinskiy; LB	Recruit ratings: Scout: Rivals:					
Seth Olsen; OG	Omaha, NE	Millard North HS	6 ft 5 in (1.96 m)	302 1/2 lb (137.2 kg)	5.40	Jan 9, 2004
Seth Olsen; OG	Recruit ratings: Scout: Rivals:					
Michael Sabers; TE	Iowa City, IA	Iowa City HS	6 ft 5 in (1.96 m)	232 1/2 lb (105.5 kg)	N/A	Jul 11, 2003
Michael Sabers; TE	Recruit ratings: Scout: Rivals:					
Adam Shada; DB	Omaha, NE	Millard North HS	6 ft 1 in (1.85 m)	175 lb (79 kg)	4.50	Jun 27, 2003
Adam Shada; DB	Recruit ratings: Scout: Rivals:					
Damian Sims; RB	Boca Raton, FL	Leonard HS	5 ft 9 1/2 in (1.77 m)	185 lb (84 kg)	4.475	Jan 28, 2004
Damian Sims; RB	Recruit ratings: Scout: Rivals:					
Anthony Williams; DB	Benton Harbor, MI	Benton Harbor HS	5 ft 9 in (1.75 m)	196 lb (89 kg)	4.62	Feb 4, 2004
Anthony Williams; DB	Recruit ratings: Scout: Rivals:					
Overall recruit ranking: Scout: 41 Rivals: 38
‡ Refers to 40-yard dash; Note: In many cases, Scout, Rivals, 247Sports, On3, and ESPN may conflict in their listings of height, weight and 40 time.; In these cases, the average was taken. ESPN grades are on a 100-point scale.; Sources: "Iowa Commit List for 2004". Rivals.; "Scout.com: Football Recruiting". Scout.; "College Football Recruiting Schools". ESPN.; "Scout.com Team Recruiting Rankings". Scout.; "2004 Team Ranking". Rivals.com.

== Schedule ==
Date	Time	Opponent	Rank	Site	TV	Result	Attendance
September 4	11:00 am	Kent State*	No. 19	Kinnick Stadium; Iowa City, IA	ESPN+	W 39–7	70,397
September 11	11:00 am	Iowa State*	No. 16	Kinnick Stadium; Iowa City, IA (Battle for the Cy-Hawk Trophy)	ESPN+	W 17–10	70,397
September 18	9:00 pm	at Arizona State*	No. 16	Sun Devil Stadium; Tempe, AZ	ESPN+	L 7–44	71,700
September 25	2:30 pm	at No. 18 Michigan		Michigan Stadium; Ann Arbor, MI	ABC	L 17–30	111,428
October 2	11:00 am	Michigan State^{†}		Kinnick Stadium; Iowa City, IA	ESPN+	W 38–16	70,397
October 16	2:30 pm	No. 25 Ohio State		Kinnick Stadium; Iowa City, IA	ABC	W 33–7	70,397
October 23	11:00 am	at Penn State	No. 25	Beaver Stadium; State College, PA	ESPN2	W 6–4	108,062
October 30	11:00 am	at Illinois	No. 23	Memorial Stadium; Champaign, IL	ESPN+	W 23–13	47,651
November 6	2:30 pm	Purdue	No. 20	Kinnick Stadium; Iowa City, IA	ESPN	W 23–21	70,397
November 13	11:00 am	at Minnesota	No. 19	Hubert H. Humphrey Metrodome; Minneapolis, MN (Battle for the Floyd of Rosedale)	ESPN	W 29–27	64,719
November 20	3:30 pm	No. 9 Wisconsin	No. 17	Kinnick Stadium; Iowa City, IA (Battle for the Heartland Trophy)	ESPN	W 30–7	70,397
January 1	12:00 pm	vs. No. 12 LSU*	No. 11	Citrus Bowl; Orlando, FL (Capital One Bowl)	ABC	W 30–25	70,229
*Non-conference game; ^{†}Homecoming; Rankings from AP Poll released prior to the game; All times are in Central time

=== Schedule note ===
Due to the Big Ten's rotating schedule, the Hawkeyes did not play either Northwestern or Indiana.

=== Strength of schedule rankings ===
- FootballFantasy.com – 13th
- Russell rankings – 18th
- AndersonSports – 18th

== Roster ==
Quarterbacks: 5 Tate, Drew – sophomore; 7 McCollom, Eric – sophomore; 12 Phillips, Cy – junior; Running backs: 21 Young, Albert – freshman; 23 Schnoor, Marcus – junior; 28 Sims, Damian – freshman; 29 Lewis, Jermelle – senior; 32 Sherlock, Kevin – junior; 33 Simmons, Marques – sophomore; 35 Busch, Tom – freshman; 36 Strube, Taylor – freshman; 43 Mickens, Aaron – senior; 46 Davis, Champ – sophomore; 48 Brownlee, Sam – sophomore; Wide receivers: 3 Aldrich, Chris – freshman; 8 Townsend, James – sophomore; 11 Hinkel, Ed – junior; 20 Huisman, Michael – freshman; 22 Davis, Calvin – sophomore; 84 Melloy, Matt – junior; 86 Holloway, Warren – senior; 88 Solomon, Clinton – junior; Tight ends: 30 Majerus, Ryan – sophomore; 41 Barkema, C.J. – junior; 81 Jackson, Tony – senior; 87 Chandler, Scott – sophomore; Offensive line: 54 Elgin, Mike – sophomore; 58 Larsen, Blake – junior; 59 Cronin, Ben – junior; 61 Ferentz, Brian – junior; 63 Plagman, Todd – sophomore; 64 Felder, Chris – sophomore; 68 Bowers, Jacob – senior; 69 McMahon, Peter – senior; 70 Gray, Lee – junior; 71 Olsen, Seth – (redshirt) freshman; 74 Walker, David – junior; 75 Gates, Ben – junior; 76 Jones, Mike – sophomore; 77 Huntrods, Clint – freshman; 79 Dollmeyer, Greg – sophomore	Defensive line: 21 Spratt, Jacob – freshman; 31 Roth, Matt – senior; 45 Babineaux, Jonathan – senior; 60 Luebke, Tyler – junior; 65 Willcox, Alex – (redshirt) freshman; 72 Eshareturi, George – freshman; 74 Roos, Nate – junior; 86 Browning, Shannon – freshman; 90 Elsallal, Saleh – junior; 92 Iwebema, Kenny – freshman; 94 Kittrell, Richard – sophomore; 98 Robinson, Derreck – senior; 99 Mattison, Bryan – freshman; Linebackers: 18 Greenway, Chad – junior; 27 Miles, Ed – sophomore; 40 Klinkenborg, Mike – freshman; 43 Mike Anderson – freshman; 47 King, Mitch – (redshirt) freshman; 49 Follett, Mike – junior; 50 Lewis, George – senior; 51 Gabelmann, Zach – sophomore; 52 Hodge, Abdul – junior; 53 Kroul, Matt – (redshirt) freshman; Defensive backs: 2 Dalton, Harold – (redshirt) freshman; 3 Dawkins, Ma'Quan – sophomore; 4 Grigsby, Herb – freshman; 10 Belleus, Walner – junior; 13 Godfrey, Charles – freshman; 14 Moylan, Devan – freshman; 15 Merrick, Miguel – sophomore; 17 Zanders, Jonathan – freshman; 19 Shada, Adam – freshman; 20 Allen, Antwan – junior; 25 Paschal, Marcus – sophomore; 26 Johnson, Jovon – junior; 29 Fletcher, Bradley – (redshirt) freshman; 32 Becker, Andrew – sophomore; 33 Williams, Anthony - freshman; 36 Ejiasi, Chigozie – senior; 37 Considine, Sean – senior	Kickers: 1 Schlicher, Kyle – sophomore; Punters: 28 Bradley, David – senior; 91 Gallery, John – junior; Long snappers: 66 Asmus, Kody – junior; 67 Kesselring, Kyle – junior; 65 Olszta, Daniel – freshman; – indicates redshirt (sat out one season)

== Coaching staff ==
Name	Position	Years at Iowa
Kirk Ferentz	Head coach	Five Years
Ken O'Keefe	Offensive coordinator and Quarterbacks	Five Years
Norm Parker	Defensive coordinator and Linebackers	Five Years
Chris Doyle	Strength and conditioning	Five Years
Lester Erb	Receivers and Special Teams	Four Years
Carl Jackson	Running backs	Five Years
Reese Morgan	Recruiting and Tight Ends	Four Years
Ron Aiken	Defensive line	Five Years
Phil Parker	Defensive backs	Five Years
Darrell Wilson	Linebackers and Special Teams	Four Years

== Rankings ==
Ranking movements Legend: ██ Increase in ranking ██ Decrease in ranking — = Not ranked RV = Received votes
	Week																
Poll	Pre	1	2	3	4	5	6	7	8	9	10	11	12	13	14	15	Final
AP	19	16	16	16	RV	—	—	—	25	23	20	19	17	12	12	11	8
Coaches	12	13	12	12	24	RV	RV	—	RV	24	20	19	17	14	14	13	8
BCS	Not released								—	23	21	20	18	11	13	12	Not released

== Game summaries ==
=== Kent State ===
Kent State (0–0) at No. 19 Iowa (0–0)

Team	1	2	3	4	Total
Golden Flashes	0	7	0	0	7
• No. 19 Hawkeyes	10	13	10	6	39

- Date: September 4
- Location: Kinnick Stadium, Iowa City, Iowa
- Game start: 11:10 a.m. CDT
- Elapsed time: 3:15
- Game attendance: 70,397
- Referee: Dan Capron
- TV announcers (ESPN+): Wayne Larrivee (play-by-play)
- Source: Box Score

Scoring summary
1	11:27	Iowa	Kyle Schlicher 20-yard field goal	Iowa 3–0
1	1:35	Iowa	Matt Melloy 9-yard pass from Drew Tate (Kyle Schlicher kick)	Iowa 10–0
2	10:23	Iowa	Albert Young 1-yard run (Kyle Schlicher kick)	Iowa 17–0
2	9:09	Iowa	Matt Melloy 4-yard pass from Drew Tate (kick failed)	Iowa 23–0
2	3:02	KSU	Jack Williams 99-yard interception return (Travis Mayle kick)	Iowa 23–7
3	7:55	Iowa	Kyle Schlicher 33-yard field goal	Iowa 26–7
3	2:58	Iowa	Aaron Mickens 4-yard run (Kyle Schlicher kick)	Iowa 33–7
4	8:52	Iowa	Chad Greenway 30-yard interception return (kick failed)	Iowa 39–7

The Hawkeyes, wearing throwback uniforms commemorating 75 years at Kinnick Stadium, smothered the Golden Flashes. Sophomore Drew Tate had two touchdown passes in his debut as starter. Junior linebacker Chad Greenway had a blocked punt and two interceptions, the latter turning into a pick six midway through the fourth quarter to close out the scoring.

Statistics	KENT	IOWA
First downs	11	22
Total yards	110	437
Rushing yards	–13	214
Passing yards	123	223
Turnovers	4	1
Time of possession	18:07	41:53

=== Iowa State ===
Iowa State (1–0) at No. 16 Iowa (1–0)
Cy-Hawk Game

Team	1	2	3	4	Total
Cyclones	3	0	7	0	10
• No. 16 Hawkeyes	7	7	3	0	17

- Date: September 11
- Location: Kinnick Stadium, Iowa City, Iowa
- Game start: 12:00 p.m. EST
- Game attendance: 70,397
- Referee: Jon Bible
- Source: Box Score

Scoring summary
1	13:05	IOWA	Albert Young 1-yard run (Kyle Schlicher kick)	Iowa 7–0
1	1:11	ISU	Brian Jansen 42-yard field goal	Iowa 7–3
2	2:49	IOWA	Ed Hinkel 29-yard pass from Drew Tate (Kyle Schlicher kick)	Iowa 14–3
3	10:44	IOWA	Kyle Schlicher 39-yard field goal	Iowa 17–3
3	0:36	ISU	Todd Blythe 40-yard pass from Austin Flynn (Brian Jansen kick)	Iowa 17–10

Statistics	ISU	IOWA
First downs	16	16
Total yards	236	305
Rushing yards	66	85
Passing yards	170	220
Turnovers	0	1
Time of possession	28:23	31:37

=== at Arizona State ===
No. 16 Iowa (2–0) at Arizona State (2–0)

Team	1	2	3	4	Total
No. 16 Hawkeyes	0	0	0	7	7
• Sun Devils	10	17	10	7	44

- Date: September 18
- Location: Sun Devil Stadium
  Tempe, AZ
- Game start: 7:45 PM CDT
- Elapsed time: 3:10
- Game attendance: 71,700
- Game weather: 75 °F (24 °C), 84% Humidity, Wind SE 20 mph (32 km/h)
- Referee: David Cutaia
- Source: Box Score

Scoring summary
1	9:49	ASU	Moey Mutz 14-yard pass from Andrew Walter (J. Ainsworth kick)	ASU 7–0
1	1:20	ASU	J. Ainsworth 28-yard field goal	ASU 10–0
2	12:08	ASU	Derek Hagan 7-yard pass from Andrew Walter (J. Ainsworth kick)	ASU 17–0
2	2:35	ASU	Zach Miller 6-yard pass from Andrew Walter (J. Ainsworth kick)	ASU 24–0
2	0:05	ASU	J. Ainsworth 48-yard field goal	ASU 27–0
3	9:40	ASU	J. Ainsworth 33-yard field goal	ASU 30–0
3	3:04	ASU	Derek Hagan 7-yard pass from Andrew Walter (J. Ainsworth kick)	ASU 37–0
4	7:47	ASU	Zach Miller 5-yard pass from Andrew Walter (J. Ainsworth kick)	ASU 44–0
4	0:18	Iowa	Walner Belleus 83-yard punt return (Kyle Schlicher kick)	ASU 44–7

Statistics	IOWA	ASU
First downs	6	23
Total yards	100	511
Rushing yards	56	76
Passing yards	44	435
Turnovers	1	1
Time of possession	23:05	36:55

=== at No. 18 Michigan ===
Iowa (2–1) at No. 18 Michigan (2–1)

Team	1	2	3	4	Total
Hawkeyes	7	0	3	7	17
• No. 18 Wolverines	0	16	7	7	30

- Date: September 18
- Location: Michigan Stadium
  Ann Arbor, MI
- Game start: 2:35 PM CDT
- Elapsed time: 3:25
- Game attendance: 111,428
- Game weather: Low 70s°F, Partly Cloudy, Wind NNW 5–10 mph (8.0–16.1 km/h)
- Referee: B. LeMonnier
- Source: Box Score

Statistics	IOWA	MICH
First downs	16	18
Total yards	255	329
Rushing yards	61	122
Passing yards	270	236
Turnovers	5	2
Time of possession	27:45	32:15

=== Michigan State ===
Michigan State (2–2) at Iowa (2–2)

Team	1	2	3	4	Total
Spartans	0	6	0	10	16
• Hawkeyes	14	3	7	14	38

- Date: October 2
- Location: Kinnick Stadium • Iowa City, Iowa
- Game start: 12:00 p.m. EDT
- Source: Box Score

Scoring summary
1	11:45	IOWA	Jermelle Lewis 47-yard run (Kyle Schlicher kick)	Iowa 7–0
1	3:11	IOWA	Ed Hinkel 15-yard pass from Drew Tate (Kyle Schlicher kick)	Iowa 14–0
2	7:39	MSU	Dave Rayner 25-yard field goal	Iowa 14–3
2	0:38	MSU	Dave Rayner 23-yard field goal	Iowa 14–6
2	0:02	IOWA	Kyle Schlicher 23-yard field goal	Iowa 17–6
3	10:54	IOWA	Tom Busch 3-yard run (Kyle Schlicher kick)	Iowa 24–6
4	14:24	IOWA	Marques Simmons 1-yard run (Kyle Schlicher kick)	Iowa 31–6
4	8:35	MSU	Dave Rayner 42-yard field goal	Iowa 31–9
4	6:48	IOWA	Marques Simmons 2-yard run (Kyle Schlicher kick)	Iowa 38–9
4	4:24	MSU	Drew Stanton 1-yard run (Dave Rayner kick)	Iowa 38–16

Statistics	MSU	IOWA
First downs	27	20
Total yards	449	464
Rushing yards	204	124
Passing yards	245	340
Turnovers	1	1
Time of possession	31:32	28:28

=== No. 25 Ohio State ===
No. 25 Ohio State (3–2) at Iowa (3–2)

Team	1	2	3	4	Total
No. 25 Buckeyes	0	0	0	7	7
• Hawkeyes	7	3	14	9	33

- Date: October 16
- Location: Kinnick Stadium
  Iowa City, IA
- Game start: 2:35 PM CDT
- Elapsed time: 3:25
- Game attendance: 70,397
- Game weather: 45 °F (7 °C), Cloudy, Wind 15–25 mph (24–40 km/h)
- Referee: Dick Honig
- Source: Box Score

Scoring summary
1	3:14	Iowa	C. Solomon 11-yard pass from D. Tate (Schlicher kick)	Iowa 7–0
2	12:50	Iowa	Schlicher 45-yard field goal	Iowa 10–0
3	12:25	Iowa	S. Chandler 8-yard pass from D. Tate (Schlicher kick)	Iowa 17–0
3	8:28	Iowa	C. Solomon 36-yard pass from D. Tate (Schlicher kick)	Iowa 24–0
4	14:53	Iowa	D. Tate 1-yard run (kick blocked)	Iowa 30–0
4	9:28	Iowa	Schlicher 41-yard field goal	Iowa 33–0
4	2:19	OSU	Nicol 23-yard pass from T. Smith (Nugent kick)	Iowa 33–7

Kirk Ferentz was able to get his first win over Ohio State in this dominant victory. Iowa's defense was relentless and held the Buckeyes to just 27 yards rushing on 29 attempts. Additionally, Ohio State only ran six plays in Hawkeye territory through the first three quarters of the game, and scored their only points with just over two minutes remaining in the game. Sophomore quarterback Drew Tate had four touchdowns (1 rushing).

Statistics	OSU	IOWA
First downs	12	24
Total yards	177	448
Rushing yards	27	117
Passing yards	150	331
Turnovers	1	1
Time of possession	26:02	33:58

=== at Penn State ===
Iowa (4–2) at Penn State (2–4)

Team	1	2	3	4	Total
• Hawkeyes	3	3	0	0	6
Nittany Lions	2	0	0	2	4

- Date: October 23
- Location: Beaver Stadium
  State College, PA
- Game start: 11:02 AM CDT
- Elapsed time: 3:14
- Game attendance: 108,062
- Game weather: 55 °F (13 °C), Cloudy, Wind 0–3 mph (0.0–4.8 km/h)
- Referee: B.LeMonnier
- TV announcers (ESPN2): Pam Ward (play-by-play) and Mike Tomczak (analyst)
- Source: Box Score

Scoring summary
1	13:34	PSU	Safety	PSU 2–0
1	1:42	Iowa	Schlicher 27-yard field goal	Iowa 3–2
2	8:24	Iowa	Schlicher 27-yard field goal	Iowa 6–2
4	8:04	PSU	Safety	Iowa 6–4

Iowa's first win without a touchdown since beating Michigan in 1985.

Statistics	IOWA	PSU
First downs	10	6
Total yards	168	147
Rushing yards	42	51
Passing yards	126	96
Turnovers	2	5
Time of possession	33:58	26:02

=== at Illinois ===
No. 23 Iowa (5–2) at Illinois (2–6)

Team	1	2	3	4	Total
• No. 23 Hawkeyes	0	7	16	0	23
Fighting Illini	7	0	0	6	13

- Date: October 30
- Location: Memorial Stadium
  Champaign, IL
- Game start: 11:10 AM CDT
- Elapsed time: 3:30
- Game attendance: 47,651
- Game weather: 63 °F (17 °C), Fair and Windy, Wind SW 28 mph (45 km/h)
- Referee: Steve Pamon
- Source: Box Score

Statistics	IOWA	ILL
First downs	19	16
Total yards	319	268
Rushing yards	76	58
Passing yards	243	210
Turnovers	1	2
Time of possession	35:10	24:50

=== Purdue ===
Purdue (5–3) at No. 20 Iowa (6–2)

Team	1	2	3	4	Total
Boilermakers	0	7	7	7	21
• No. 20 Hawkeyes	17	0	0	6	23

- Date: November 6
- Location: Kinnick Stadium
  Iowa City, IA
- Game start: 2:35 PM CST
- Elapsed time: 3:35
- Game attendance: 70,397
- Game weather: 68 °F (20 °C), Clear, Wind WSW 11 mph (18 km/h)
- Referee: Dave Witvoet
- Source: Box Score

Statistics	PUR	IOWA
First downs	19	18
Total yards	357	321
Rushing yards	52	43
Passing yards	305	278
Turnovers	5	1
Time of possession	27:51	32:09

=== at Minnesota ===
No. 19 Iowa (7–2) at Minnesota (6–4)
Floyd of Rosedale

Team	1	2	3	4	Total
• No. 19 Hawkeyes	10	13	3	3	29
Golden Gophers	3	7	10	7	27

- Date: November 13
- Location: Hubert H. Humphrey Metrodome
  Minneapolis, MN
- Game start: 11:10 AM CST
- Elapsed time: 3:05
- Game attendance: 64,719
- Game weather: Indoors
- Referee: Bill LeMonnier
- Source: Box Score

In one of the more unlikely victories of the season, Iowa traveled to the Metrodome to challenge the Golden Gophers powerful rushing duo of Marion Barber III and Laurence Maroney. The Hawkeye defense came into the game rated #1 in the country in rushing defense.

Despite that, the Gopher tandem shredded the Hawkeye defense with the Gophers outrushing Iowa by an outlandish margin of 337 to 6 in yards gained. The Hawkeyes prevailed however behind the deft passing and scrambling of sophomore quarterback Drew Tate, a pass defense that held the Gophers to 73 yards through the air and forced three turnovers, and Iowa's sophomore place-kicker Kyle Schlicher, who was a perfect 5–5 in field goals.

The Hawkeyes led virtually the entire game, but needed a huge defensive stop in the closing minutes, with Jr. linebacker Chad Greenway stopping Marion Barber III for a key loss on 2nd down in Iowa territory and eventually forcing Minnesota to attempt a 51-yard field goal, trailing by two. Although Gopher placekicker Rhyss Lloyd had won three games in his career with last-minute field goals, this time his attempt shanked wide.

QB Drew Tate then guided the Hawks to one closing first down with the help of an offside penalty on Minnesota, and the Hawks survived, winning their sixth consecutive game, all against Big 10 teams. By the time the Hawkeyes kicked off in their next (and final) regular-season game, they learned they would be playing for a portion of the Big Ten title.

Statistics	IOWA	MINN
First downs	18	20
Total yards	339	410
Rushing yards	6	337
Passing yards	333	73
Turnovers	0	4
Time of possession	30:56	29:04

=== No. 9 Wisconsin ===
No. 9 Wisconsin (9–1) at No. 17 Iowa (8–2)
Heartland Trophy

Team	1	2	3	4	Total
No. 9 Badgers	0	7	0	0	7
• No. 17 Hawkeyes	7	7	10	6	30

- Date: November 20
- Location: Kinnick Stadium
  Iowa City, IA
- Game start: 2:30 PM CST
- Elapsed time: 3:05
- Game attendance: 70,397
- Game weather: 49 °F (9 °C), Cloudy, Wind NW 14 mph (23 km/h)
- Referee: Dennis Lipski
- Source: Box Score

Scoring summary
1	4:22	Iowa	C. Solomon 6-yard pass from Tate (Schlicher kick)	Iowa 7–0
2	1:51	Wis	Booker 4-yard run (Allen kick)	Tied 7–7
2	1:00	Iowa	C. Solomon 51-yard pass from D. Tate (Schlicher kick)	Iowa 14–7
3	3:54	Iowa	S. Chandler 12-yard pass from D. Tate (Schlicher kick)	Iowa 21–7
3	1:37	Iowa	Schlicher 31-yard field goal	Iowa 24–7
4	10:59	Iowa	Schlicher 21-yard field goal	Iowa 27–7
4	6:50	Iowa	Schlicher 34-yard field goal	Iowa 30–7

Iowa clinched a share of Big Ten title with this victory over Wisconsin. The Hawkeyes' defense was smothering, holding a top-ten Badger team to just seven points. Fans rushed the field as it capped off a historic run and an undefeated home season.

Statistics	WIS	IOWA
First downs	15	14
Total yards	186	262
Rushing yards	41	76
Passing yards	145	186
Turnovers	3	3
Time of possession	26:16	33:44

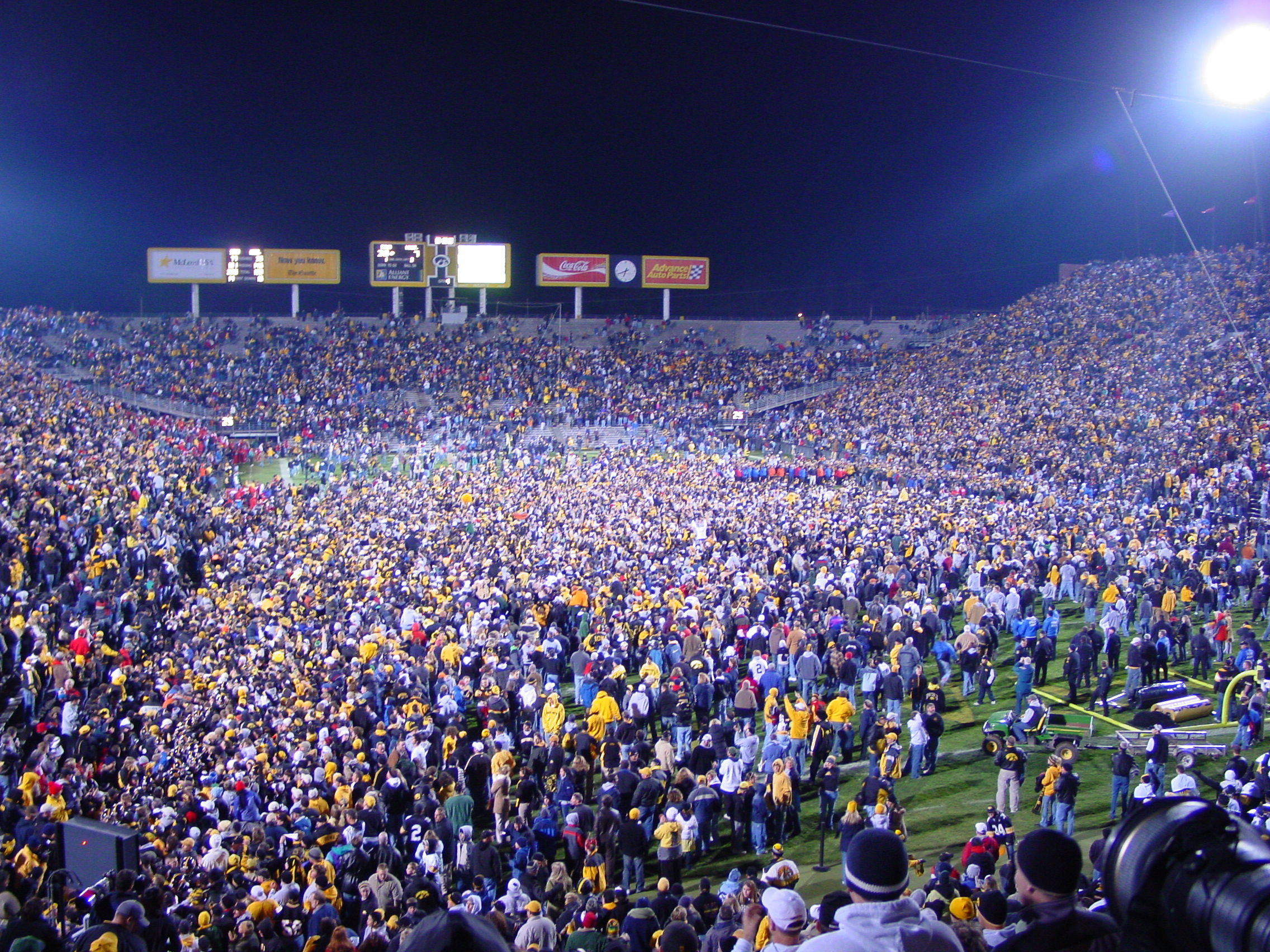
Fans celebrate Iowa's victory over the Wisconsin Badgers.

=== vs. No. 11 LSU (Capital One Bowl) ===
#11 LSU (9–2) vs. #12 Iowa (9–2)
Capital One Bowl

Team	1	2	3	4	Total
No. 11 Tigers	0	12	0	13	25
• No. 12 Hawkeyes	7	7	3	13	30

- Date: January 1
- Location: Florida Citrus Bowl • Orlando, Florida
- Game start: 1:00 p.m. EST
- Game attendance: 70,229
- Game weather: 75 °F (24 °C), Mostly Sunny
- Referee: Hal Dowden
- TV announcers (ABC): Gary Thorne (Play-by-Play), Ed Cunningham (Analyst), Jerry Punch (Sidelines)
- Source: Box Score

Scoring summary
1	12:42	Iowa	Clinton Solomon 57-yard pass from Drew Tate (Kyle Schlicher kick)	Iowa 7–0
2	14:51	LSU	Chris Jackson 29-yard field goal	Iowa 7–3
2	9:26	LSU	Chris Jackson 47-yard field goal	Iowa 7–6
2	1:04	Iowa	Punt blocked, recovered by Sean Considine, advanced for a touchdown (Kyle Schlicher kick)	Iowa 14–6
2	0:38	LSU	Alley Broussard 74-yard run (Chris Jackson missed PAT)	Iowa 14–12
3	9:59	Iowa	Kyle Schlicher 19-yard field goal	Iowa 17–12
4	12:48	Iowa	Marques Simmons 4-yard run (Kyle Schlicher kick)	Iowa 24–12
4	8:21	LSU	Skyler Green 22-yard pass from JaMarcus Russell (Chris Jackson kick)	Iowa 24–19
4	0:46	LSU	Skyler Green 3-yard pass from JaMarcus Russell (Two-point attempt failed)	LSU 25–24
4	0:00	Iowa	Warren Holloway 56-yard pass from Drew Tate	Iowa 30–25

LSU would not go away in this back-and-forth bowl game. The Tigers took the lead with under a minute to play. Drew Tate was able to find Warren Holloway for a 56-yard pass as time expired to give the Hawkeyes a miracle victory which would become to be known as "The Catch" among Iowa fans.

Statistics	LSU	IOWA
First downs	19	16
Total yards	346	334
Rushing yards	118	47
Passing yards	228	287
Turnovers	1	2
Time of possession	34:12	25:48

== Team players in the 2005 NFL draft ==
Player	Position	Round	Pick	NFL club
Matt Roth	Defensive End	2	46	Miami Dolphins
Jonathan Babineaux	Defensive Tackle	2	59	Atlanta Falcons
Sean Considine	Defensive Back	4	102	Philadelphia Eagles
Tony Jackson	Tight End	6	196	Seattle Seahawks
Pete McMahon	Tackle	6	214	Oakland Raiders
