= Skyler Green =

American gridiron football player (born 1984)

No. 10, 18
- Positions: Wide receiver, return specialist

Personal information
- Born: September 12, 1984 (age 42); Houma, Louisiana, U.S.
- Listed height: 5 ft 9 in (1.75 m)
- Listed weight: 190 lb (86 kg)

Career information
- High school: L.W. Higgins (Marrero, Louisiana)
- College: LSU
- NFL draft: 2006: 4th round, 125th overall pick

Career history
- Dallas Cowboys (2006); Cincinnati Bengals (2006–2007); New Orleans Saints (2008); Edmonton Eskimos (2009–2010); New Orleans VooDoo (2011–2012, 2014)

Awards and highlights
- BCS national champion (2003); First-team All-American (2003); Third-team All-American (2005); First-team All-SEC (2005); Second-team All-SEC (2003); SEC Special Teams Player of the Year (2005)

Career NFL statistics
- Receptions: 3
- Receiving yards: 33
- Return yards: 256
- Stats at Pro Football Reference
- Stats at ArenaFan.com

Skyler Levon Green (born September 12, 1984) is an American former professional football player who was a wide receiver and return specialist in the National Football League (NFL) for the Dallas Cowboys, Cincinnati Bengals and New Orleans Saints. He also was a member of the Edmonton Eskimos in the Canadian Football League (CFL) and the New Orleans VooDoo of the Arena Football League (AFL). He played college football for the LSU Tigers, earning All-American honors.

== Early life ==
Green was born and raised in the New Orleans suburb of Westwego. He attended L.W. Higgins High School, where he played as a multi-threat quarterback. As a senior, he rushed for 2,174 yards on 194 carries, while receiving All-State, MVP of district and MVP of the All-New Orleans Metro team. He had 224 rushing yards and 124 passing yards in a first round 5A state playoff loss against Catholic High School.

== College career ==
Green accepted a football scholarship from Louisiana State University, over Alabama and Louisiana Tech. He was originally recruited as a running back, but switched to wide receiver to get more playing time.

During his career, Green was also particularly dangerous as a punt returner, returning his first punt as a Tiger for a touchdown at Arizona in 2003. He finished his LSU career with four punt returns for touchdowns, also scoring against the Florida Gators in 2003, the Vanderbilt Commodores in 2004, and the Auburn Tigers in 2005. On LSU's 2003 National Championship Team, Green led the nation in yards-per-return, at 18.5.

He played for LSU for four seasons and caught 111 passes for 1,129 yards and nine touchdowns. He finished ranked No. 1 in school history for punts returned for touchdowns (4), No. 2 in punt return yards (1,064) and just outside the top 10 in all-purpose yards (3,243). He led the nation in punt returns with an 18.5 average in 2003.

=== 2002 season ===
As a true freshman, he stepped in as one of LSU's three primary receivers after Devery Henderson broke his arm in the 11th game of the season against the University of Mississippi. The next week, at Arkansas, Green took a Marcus Randall screen pass 67 yards for a touchdown and had a total of 92 receiving yards. He appeared in 7 games, making 7 receptions for 123 yards, one touchdown and 3 carries for 28 yards.

=== 2003 season ===
As a sophomore, he remained one of the Tigers' three primary receivers, after Jerel Myers graduated. Green caught 48 passes for 519 yards and 5 touchdowns. He was considered one of the best college punt returners, leading the nation in punt returns with an 18.5-yard average on 25 returns, for a total of 462 punt returns yards. He had an 80-yard touchdown return against the University of Florida and a 62-yard touchdown return against the University of Arizona.

His best play of the year was against #7 Georgia (televised by CBS). With the score tied 10–10 with 1:22 left in the game, LSU faced a third and four from Georgia's 34. On what looked like a busted play, Green sprinted free for quarterback Matt Mauck, who lofted the ball toward Green just as he was getting hit by Georgia linebacker Odell Thurman. Green sprinted under the ball, dove to the ground in the end zone and caught the pass for a game-winning touchdown, sending the LSU-record crowd of 92,251 into a frenzy. A photo of catch was featured the next week in Sports Illustrated.

=== 2004 season ===
As a junior, even though Michael Clayton and Devery Henderson graduated, Green still had to compete with Craig Davis, Dwayne Bowe, and Early Doucet for time as one of LSU's three primary receivers.

Green suffered a high ankle sprain in the team's second scrimmage of fall camp and then re-injured it in the season-opener against Oregon State University. He was limited the rest of the season. He had 6 receptions for 59 yards and 2 touchdowns in the loss against the University of Iowa in the 2005 Capital One Bowl. He finished with 24 catches, 219 yards, and 3 touchdowns.

He returned 11 kickoffs for 249 yards, 25 punts for 243 yards and one touchdown. He ranked fourth in the SEC with a 9.7-yard average. He returned a punt 65 yards for a touchdown against Vanderbilt University.

=== 2005 season ===
As a senior, he appeared in 13 games with 4 starts. He caught 32 passes for 268 yards and 16 carries for 126 yards. He returned 27 punts for 359 yards (13.3-yard average) and 18 kickoffs for 355 yards (19.7-yard average). He set the school record for punt returns for touchdowns, with his fourth on a 66-yarder in a win over Auburn University. He was named the SEC Special Teams Player of the Year after ranking third in the conference in punt returns with a 13.3-yard average. He was named third-team All-American by the Associated Press.

Green had 9 receptions for 63 yards, 5 punt returns for 78 yards, including a 37-yarder that set up a touchdown and returned a kickoff 30 yards in a win over Mississippi State University. He was used in multiple positions in LSU's 40–3 win against the University of Miami in the 2005 Peach Bowl. He returned punts and kickoffs, as well as playing a few snaps at quarterback and his usual position of wide receiver.

== Professional career ==
Pre-draft measurables
| Height | Weight | Arm length | Hand span | 40-yard dash | 10-yard split | 20-yard split | 20-yard shuttle | Three-cone drill | Vertical jump | Broad jump |
|---|---|---|---|---|---|---|---|---|---|---|
| 5 ft 9 1/8 in (1.76 m) | 192 lb (87 kg) | 29 1/2 in (0.75 m) | 8 3/8 in (0.21 m) | 4.51 s | 1.58 s | 2.65 s | 4.20 s | 6.84 s | 34.0 in (0.86 m) | 10 ft 0 in (3.05 m) |
All values from NFL Combine/Pro Day

=== Dallas Cowboys ===
Green was selected by the Dallas Cowboys in the fourth round (125th overall) in the 2006 NFL draft. On September 2, he was waived and subsequently signed to the practice squad on September 4, where he was converted to running back. He was promoted to the active roster on October 13. He was active in two games, returning 5 punts and 3 kickoffs. He was released two months later on December 7 to make room for safety Tony Parrish. He was promoted to the active roster on December 11. He was released on December 14, to make room for tight end Andy Thorn.

=== Cincinnati Bengals ===
On December 15, 2006, Green was claimed off waivers by the Cincinnati Bengals. He did not play the rest of the season and was moved back to the wide receiver position. In 2007, he appeared in 7 games where he was the team's punt returner. He was declared inactive for the eighth contest of the season. On November 5, he was waived to make room on the roster for wide receiver Chris Henry, who was returning from an eight-game suspension. He was re-signed to the practice squad on November 7, where he spent the remainder of the season.

=== New Orleans Saints ===
On January 3, 2008, he was signed as a free agent by the New Orleans Saints. He was released during final cuts on August 30 and re-signed to the practice squad one day later. He was promoted to the active roster on December 20, appearing in the final two games and returning four kickoffs for 160 yards. He averaged 33.3 yards in his brief duty, including returns of 60 and 42 yards. He was waived on September 5, 2009.

=== Edmonton Eskimos ===
Green was signed by the Edmonton Eskimos on October 6, 2009. He was released on December 16, after an injury-plagued 2010 season.

=== New Orleans VooDoo ===
In 2011, 2012 and 2014, he was a member of the New Orleans VooDoo of the Arena Football League.
