= Justin Vincent =

American football player (born 1983)

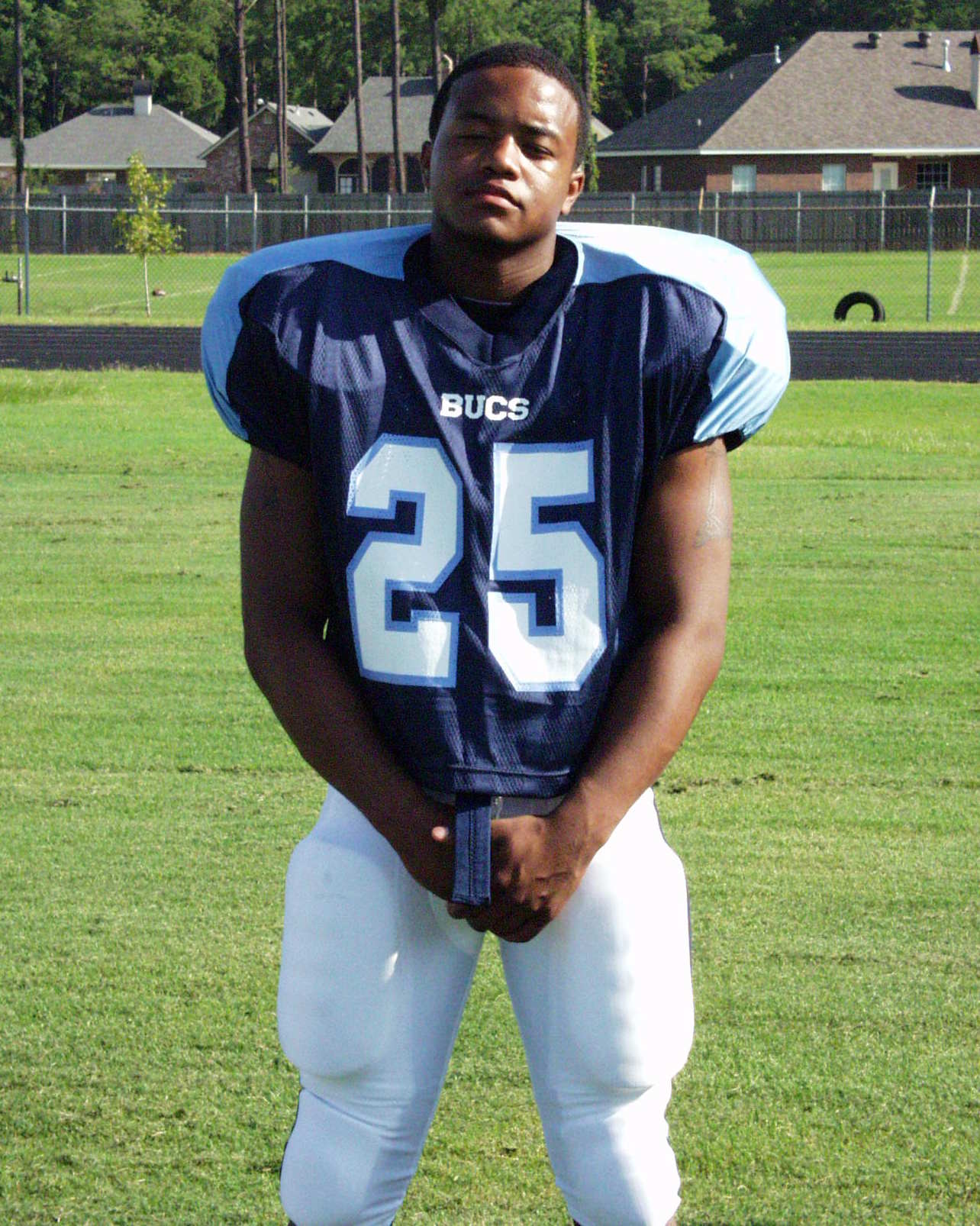
- Vincent in high school

No. 28
- Position: Running back

Personal information
- Born: January 25, 1983 (age 43); Lake Charles, Louisiana, U.S.
- Listed height: 5 ft 10 in (1.78 m)
- Listed weight: 219 lb (99 kg)

Career information
- High school: Alfred M. Barbe (Lake Charles, Louisiana)
- College: LSU (2003–2006)
- NFL draft: 2007: undrafted

Career history
- Atlanta Falcons (2007)*; Pittsburgh Steelers (2007–2009)*
- * Offseason or practice squad member only

Awards and highlights
- Super Bowl champion (XLIII); BCS national champion (2003); Sugar Bowl MVP (2004)

Justin Vincent (born January 25, 1983) is an American former football running back for the Pittsburgh Steelers of the National Football League (NFL). He was signed by the Atlanta Falcons as an undrafted free agent in 2007. He played college football for Louisiana State University, and was the MVP of the 2004 BCS National Championship game. He helped win Super Bowl XLIII with the Steelers, his only championship.

== Early life ==
Vincent came to LSU from Barbe High School in Lake Charles, Louisiana. There, he was a high school All-American at running back and the Louisiana high school football player of the year.

== College career ==
During his freshman year, Vincent began the season near the bottom of the depth chart. Joseph Addai was the starter and Shyrone Carey was the backup at the beginning of the season. Vincent, along with fellow freshmen Alley Broussard and Barrington Edwards, split time on the third string. But Vincent beat out his fellow freshmen for playing time, and by the middle of the season, Addai and Carey were injured. He was named the starter in week 7 against South Carolina, and never lost the job for the rest of the season.

While LSU made its stretch run to the national championship, Vincent became the offensive leader. In LSU's final four games, he ran for 100 or more yards. This included a 201-yard, two touchdown performance in the SEC Championship Game against Georgia. His performance included an 87-yard touchdown run (the longest run in SEC Championship Game history) and a 62-yard run. Then, in the 2004 Sugar Bowl against Oklahoma, he ran for 117 yards and a touchdown. It included a 64-yard run from the first play from scrimmage, which helped set the tone for the game. Vincent was named the MVP of both the 2003 SEC Championship Game and the 2004 Sugar Bowl, and LSU won the 2003 BCS National Championship. He finished the 2003 season with 1,001 yards on 154 carries, and scored 10 touchdowns.

Vincent's next three years at LSU were marked with inconsistency, fumbles and injury. He began 2004 as the starter, but eventually fell behind Joseph Addai and Alley Broussard on the depth chart. He finished third on the team in rushing with 322 yards.

In 2005, he moved back up to second string behind Joseph Addai after Alley Broussard injured his knee before the season. He finished the season with 488 yards rushing. However, Vincent suffered a serious knee injury at the end of the season in LSU's Peach Bowl victory over Miami.

Vincent was the starting tailback for 5 games in the 2006 season, after recovering from his knee injury. However, his senior season was the least productive of his four years at LSU. He was part of a five-man running back rotation (which also included Jacob Hester, Broussard, Keiland Williams and Charles Scott), and he finished 6th on the team in rushing at the end of the regular season with 139 yards. He averaged 3.1 yards per carry, lowest among the five running backs. However, in the 2007 Sugar Bowl, he had his best game of the season, gaining 71 yards on 12 carries.

== Professional career ==
Pre-draft measurables
Height	Weight	40-yard dash	10-yard split	20-yard split	20-yard shuttle	Three-cone drill	Vertical jump	Broad jump	Bench press
5 ft 10 3/8 in (1.79 m)	207 lb (94 kg)	4.65 s	1.57 s	2.68 s	4.49 s	7.09 s	29.5 in (0.75 m)	9 ft 1 in (2.77 m)	16 reps
All values from Pro Day

=== Atlanta Falcons ===
Vincent was signed by the Atlanta Falcons on May 1, 2007, but on September 1, 2007, it was announced that he was cut from the Falcons final roster.

=== Pittsburgh Steelers ===
On October 4, 2007, he signed with the Pittsburgh Steelers as a member of the practice squad. Vincent was released from the Steelers' practice squad on October 24, 2008. He was re-signed to the practice squad on November 7.

On February 6, 2009, he was re-signed by the Steelers to a future contract. He was waived on September 4. He re-joined the Steelers practice squad for a third straight season on September 6. He was released from the practice squad on November 24. He was re-signed to the practice squad on December 2. On January 6, 2010, he was signed to a reserve future contract. Vincent was released by the Steelers on September 3, 2010.

=== Post-football career ===
After his playing career ended, Vincent returned to LSU as the assistant director of player personnel and host of the Fox Sports program, Louisiana Sunday Kickoff. He later moved to a fundraising role at the Tiger Athletic Foundation.
