= Craig Davis (American football) =

American football player (born 1985)

Buster Davis
No. 84
- Position: Wide receiver

Personal information
- Born: October 2, 1985 (age 41); New Orleans, Louisiana, U.S.
- Listed height: 6 ft 1 in (1.85 m)
- Listed weight: 210 lb (95 kg)

Career information
- High school: O. Perry Walker (New Orleans)
- College: LSU (2003–2006)
- NFL draft: 2007: 1st round, 30th overall pick

Career history
- San Diego Chargers (2007–2010); Buffalo Bills (2011)*
- * Offseason or practice squad member only

Awards and highlights
- BCS national champion (2003); Second-team All-SEC (2006)

Career NFL statistics
- Receptions: 51
- Receiving yards: 558
- Receiving touchdowns: 2
- Stats at Pro Football Reference

Craig "Buster" Davis (born October 2, 1985) is an American former professional football player who was a wide receiver in the National Football League (NFL). He was selected by the San Diego Chargers in the first round of the 2007 NFL draft. He played college football for the LSU Tigers.

== Early life ==
Davis was rated the number one wide receiver in Louisiana and a national blue chipper as a senior at O.P. Walker High School. In his final year he caught 82 passes for 1,171 yards and 16 touchdowns leading his school to the 4A state championship game.

He was named an All-American by SuperPrep and ranked the No. 12 wide receiver in the country by Rivals.com. The Orlando Sentinel named Davis as a member of the All-Southern Team. He also made The Times-Picayune's Top 25 Blue-Chip list and Shreveport Times ' Top 20.

== College career ==
Davis enrolled in LSU in 2003. He was forced to compete for game time with an extremely talented Tigers receiving corp that helped lead LSU to a BCS National Championship. He caught 7 passes for 63 yards, most of which came in LSU's 49–10 victory over Louisiana Tech.

In Davis' sophomore year the Tigers failed to repeat their success of 2003. In spite of this Davis emerged as the Tigers' receiving leader with 43 catches for 659 yards. He scored his first touchdown in the Tigers 24–7 win over Vanderbilt.

Davis played in 11 of the Tigers games in 2005, starting 5. He ranked third on the team with 35 receptions, for 559 yards and 2 touchdowns. The high point of his season came in the Peach Bowl where he caught 5 passes for 99 yards and a touchdown in a 40–3 win over Miami.

As a senior Davis doubled as a receiver and a punt returner. He finished the year with 56 catches for 834 yards and four touchdowns. He finished his career with four catches for 50 yards in the Sugar Bowl against Notre Dame in his home of New Orleans.

=== College statistics ===
Year	Team	Rec	Yards	Average	Long	TDs
2003	LSU	7	63	9.0	17	0
2004	LSU	43	659	15.3	42	1
2005	LSU	35	559	16.0	51	2
2006	LSU	56	836	14.9	47	4
College totals		141	2117	15.0	51	7

== Professional career ==
Pre-draft measurables
Height	Weight	40-yard dash	10-yard split	20-yard split	Broad jump
6 ft 1 3/8 in (1.86 m)	207 lb (94 kg)	4.41 s	1.49 s	2.54 s	10 ft 1 in (3.07 m)
All values from NFL Combine/Pro Day

=== San Diego Chargers ===
Davis was selected by the San Diego Chargers 30th overall at the end of the first round of the 2007 NFL draft.

On July 23, 2007, Davis agreed with the Chargers on a 5-year $11 million contract just before training camp. If Davis played out the contract, it was worth $7.83 million with about $3.2 million in incentives.

He finished his rookie season playing in 14 games, with one start, making 20 receptions for 188 yards and one touchdown.

During his second season Davis only played in four games due to an injury. He finished the season with four receptions for 59 yards.

Davis was released by the Chargers on July 28, 2011.

=== Buffalo Bills ===
Davis signed with the Buffalo Bills on August 4, 2011. The Bills cut Davis on September 3, 2011.
