= Drew Tate =

American gridiron football player and coach (born 1984)

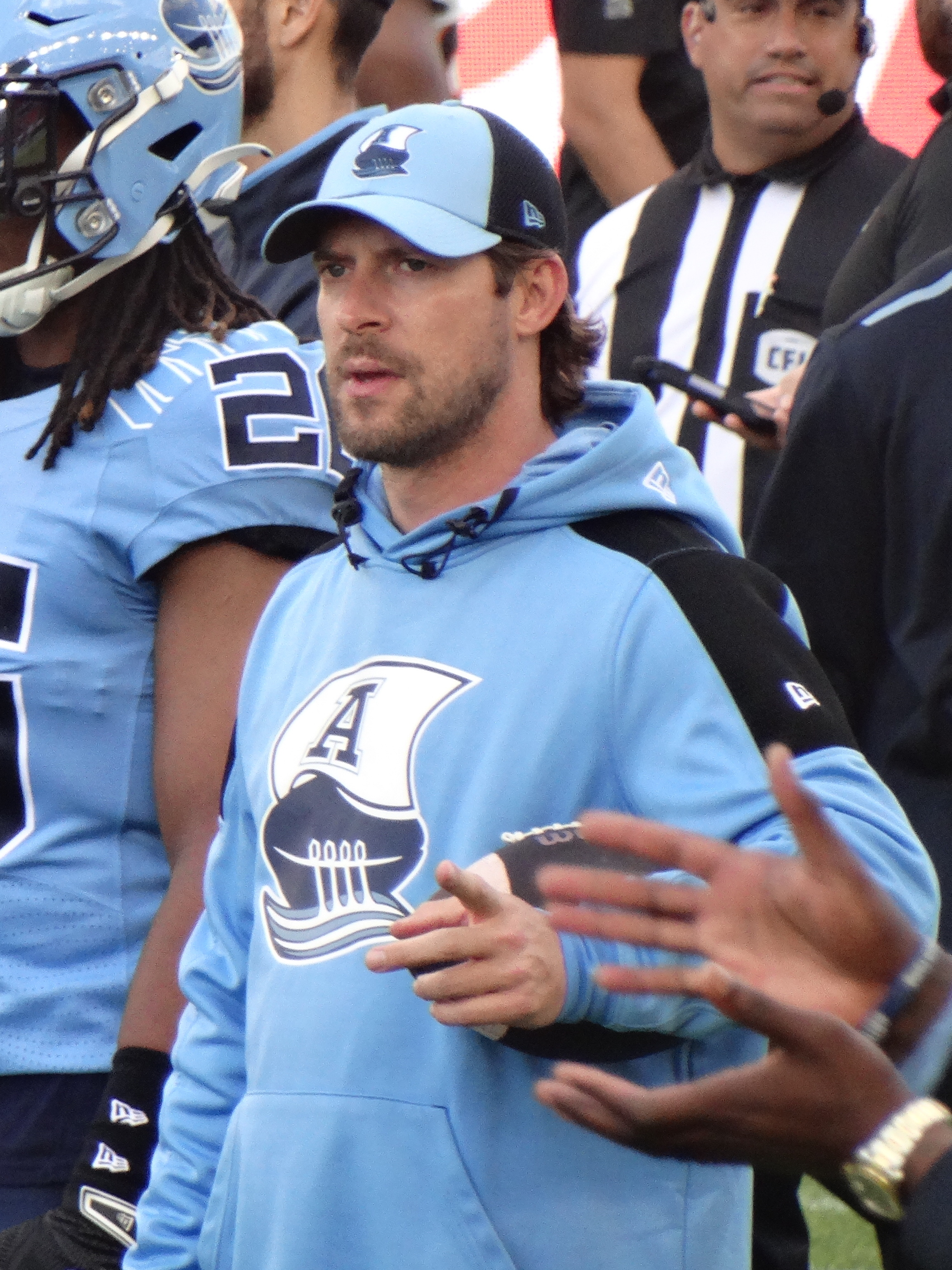
- Tate with the Toronto Argonauts in 2024

Ottawa Redblacks
- Title: Quarterbacks coach

Personal information
- Born: October 8, 1984 (age 42); Baytown, Texas, U.S.
- Listed height: 6 ft 0 in (1.83 m)
- Listed weight: 190 lb (86 kg)

Career information
- Position: Quarterback (No. 4)
- High school: Robert E. Lee
- College: Iowa
- NFL draft: 2007: undrafted

Career history

Playing
- 2007: St. Louis Rams*
- 2007–2008: Saskatchewan Roughriders*
- 2009–2016: Calgary Stampeders
- 2017: Ottawa Redblacks
- 2018: Saskatchewan Roughriders
- * Offseason or practice squad member only

Coaching
- 2018: Coastal Carolina (defensive analyst)
- 2019: BC Lions (Quarterbacks coach)
- 2020: TSL Alphas (WR/TE/RB)
- 2021: UT Martin (Quarterbacks coach)
- 2022: Northern Iowa (Tight ends coach)
- 2023: Saskatchewan Roughriders (Receivers coach)
- 2024–2025: Toronto Argonauts (Offensive assistant)
- 2026–present: Ottawa Redblacks (Quarterbacks coach)

Awards and highlights
- 3× Grey Cup champion (2007, 2014, 2024); CFL rushing touchdowns leader (2014); First-team All-Big Ten (2004)
- Stats at CFL.ca

Drew Tate (born October 8, 1984) is an American gridiron football coach and former player. He is the quarterbacks coach for the Ottawa Redblacks of the Canadian Football League (CFL). He played college football as a quarterback at the University of Iowa and was signed by the St. Louis Rams of the National Football League (NFL) as an undrafted free agent in 2007. Tate has played professionally for the Saskatchewan Roughriders, Calgary Stampeders and Ottawa Redblacks in the CFL. He was a defensive analyst at Coastal Carolina University in 2018, before coming out of retirement to rejoin the Roughriders. On December 17, 2018, Tate retired from playing and was named quarterbacks coach for the BC Lions the following day. He has also been a coach for the TSL Alphas, and at UT Martin and the University of Northern Iowa.

== Early life ==
Tate attended Robert E. Lee High School in Baytown, Texas, where he was coached there by his stepfather Dick Olin and had a record breaking career. He ranks first in the Texas high school football record book in career pass attempts and completions, ahead of Graham Harrell. He also ranks second in career passing yards with 12,183, behind Harrell (12,532), and third in career touchdown passes with 113, behind Harrell (167) and Colt McCoy (116).

He originally committed to Texas A&M, but de-committed after R. C. Slocum was replaced with Dennis Franchione. Tate also noted that he would likely sit behind established starter Reggie McNeal, so he chose to play for the University of Iowa under coach Kirk Ferentz. He played in the 2003 U.S. Army All-American Bowl.

== College career ==
=== 2005 Capital One Bowl ===
At the 2005 Capital One Bowl, game well-attended by Iowa fans in Orlando, Florida, the Hawkeye defense played strong against the LSU offense. However, LSU took their first lead with 46 seconds remaining. LSU was coached by Nick Saban in his last year before taking over at the Miami Dolphins. On the game's final play, Tate attained fame when he threw a 56-yard, game-winning touchdown pass to senior Warren Holloway as time expired. This was Holloway's only touchdown at Iowa. Many Iowa fans say this was the greatest play in the school's football history.

=== Honors ===
- All-Big Ten Conference first-team (coaches) and second-team (media)
- 2004 Big Ten Player of the Year (collegefootballnews.com)
- 2005 Capital One Bowl MVP

== Professional career ==
Pre-draft measurables
Height	Weight	40-yard dash	10-yard split	20-yard split	20-yard shuttle	Three-cone drill	Vertical jump	Broad jump
5 ft 11 1/8 in (1.81 m)	200 lb (91 kg)	4.90 s	1.59 s	2.78 s	4.18 s	6.87 s	32.0 in (0.81 m)	9 ft 3 in (2.82 m)
All values from Pro Day

=== St. Louis Rams ===
On May 3, 2007, Tate signed with the St. Louis Rams as a free agent, but he became expendable after the Rams signed Brock Berlin. Tate was released on May 22, 2007.

=== Saskatchewan Roughriders (first stint) ===
After his release from the Rams, Tate signed a practice roster agreement with the Saskatchewan Roughriders in 2007. After spending two years on either the practice roster or the injured reserve list, Tate was removed from the practice roster on November 9, 2008, and became a free agent.

=== Calgary Stampeders ===
Tate signed with the Calgary Stampeders on June 3, 2009.

On November 9, 2010, Tate signed a contract extension with the Stampeders. Due to ineffective play by incumbent quarterback Henry Burris, Tate received his first professional start against his former team, the Roughriders, on October 22, 2011, and posted a 25–13 win. Tate went on to lead the Stampeders to three straight wins to the finish off the regular season. Drew Tate made his first CFL Playoff start against the Edmonton Eskimos. Tate struggled throwing 5 completions in 10 attempts for 99 yards and an interception. At the start of the second half he was replaced by Henry Burris who could not lead the Stamps to victory, thus ending the season. In the off-season the Stamps traded away Burris making Tate the starting quarterback.

He opened the 2012 CFL season with a dominant win over the Montreal Alouettes. However, in the second week of the season Tate suffered a dislocated shoulder in his non-throwing arm. Tate opted to perform surgery on it immediately, seemingly ending his season. However, Tate returned to play in the final two games of the regular season. Tate was announced the starter for Stamps home game of the Western Division Semi-Finals against the Saskatchewan Roughriders. He broke his forearm and may have suffered a concussion during the game but played the entire game nonetheless. His 68-yard TD pass to Romby Bryant with only 20 seconds left gave the Stamps the victory. However, the broken forearm caused him to miss the Western Final and the 100th Grey Cup.

In Week 2 of the 2013 CFL season Tate could not finish the game after straining a forearm muscle in his throwing arm early in the game. Tate confessed to feeling pain in the same muscle in the month prior to the injury but played through the pre-season and majority of the first 2 weeks. Tate was listed as day-to-day and did not start Week 3 against the Montreal Alouettes; his back-up QB Kevin Glenn played in his place. Tate was expected to return to the starting position for Week 7, however, he suffered a setback to his throwing arm in practice leading up to the game on August 9. On August 8, it was announced that Tate would miss an additional two to three weeks. Coach John Hufnagel compared the injury to tennis elbow. Tate finished the 2013 season having only played in 7 games due to various injuries. In the off-season starting quarterback Kevin Glenn was selected by the Ottawa RedBlacks in the Expansion Draft. On January 14, 2014, Tate was signed to a contract extension.

Tate was primarily used in short yardage situations and led the CFL in rushing touchdowns during the 2014 season with ten scores as the backup to Bo Levi Mitchell. He scored two one-yard rushing touchdowns in the Stampeders' 20–16 victory over the Hamilton Tiger-Cats in the 102nd Grey Cup. As a passer Tate attempted his second most passes in a single season with 111, completing a career low of only 59.5% of them. Less than one month prior to becoming a free-agent Drew Tate and the Stampeders agreed to a contract extension. Tate continued as the Stamps backup quarterback behind Bo Levi Mitchell for the 2015 and 2016 seasons; starting in only 1 game each season to rest Mitchell for the playoffs.

=== Ottawa Redblacks ===
On February 21, 2017, Tate was traded to the Ottawa Redblacks for a fifth-round draft pick in the 2018 CFL draft. He was the team's back-up quarterback and started one game for the Redblacks after incumbent starter, Trevor Harris, was out due to injury. He was released on the eve of 2018 free agency on February 12, 2018. On June 1, 2018, Tate announced his retirement, and accepted a coaching position at Coastal Carolina as a defensive analyst.

=== Saskatchewan Roughriders (second stint) ===
On November 3, 2018, the final day of the 2018 regular season, Tate came out of retirement to join the Saskatchewan Roughriders, the team he started his CFL career with ten years prior. The Roughriders were on a bye week during week 20, but Tate was active for the Roughriders playoff loss to the Blue Bombers. On December 17, 2018, Tate announced he was again retiring from the Canadian Football League.

== Career statistics ==
		Passing									Rushing
Year	Team	Games	Started	Comp	Att	Pct	Yards	TD	Int	Rating	Att	Yards	Avg	Long	TD	Fumb
2009	CGY	18	0	9	11	81.8	78	0	0	99.8	2	20	10.0	20	0	0
2010	CGY	18	0	44	62	71.0	521	7	0	133.9	36	189	5.3	40	5	1
2011	CGY	13	3	101	158	63.9	1,346	8	5	94.6	44	149	3.4	16	4	1
2012	CGY	8	3	46	63	73.0	570	4	3	102.0	4	31	7.8	11	1	1
2013	CGY	18	2	59	87	67.8	755	5	1	109.1	20	77	3.9	16	3	1
2014	CGY	18	4	66	111	59.5	823	5	3	86.3	42	129	3.1	15	10	2
2015	CGY	18	1	28	37	75.7	322	3	1	117.2	9	14	1.6	9	1	0
2016	CGY	18	1	27	43	62.8	255	0	2	59.7	3	8	2.7	6	0	0
2017	OTT	18	1	30	43	69.8	338	3	1	106.5	2	12	6.0	6	0	0
2018	SSK	0	0	0	0	0	0	0	0	0	0	0	0	0	0	0
CFL totals		147	15	410	615	66.7	5,008	35	16	100.9	162	629	3.9	40	24	6

Playoffs					Passing					Rushing		
Year	Team	Game	GP	GS	Att	Cmp	Yards	TD	Int	Att	Yards	TD
2007	SSK	West Semi-Final	0	-	-	-	-	-	-	-	-	-
2007	SSK	West Final	0	-	-	-	-	-	-	-	-	-
2008	SSK	West Semi-Final	0	-	-	-	-	-	-	-	-	-
2009	CGY	West Semi-Final	1	0	0	-	-	-	-	0	-	-
2009	CGY	West Final	1	0	0	-	-	-	-	0	-	-
2010	CGY	West Final	1	0	0	-	-	-	-	1	2	0
2011	CGY	West Semi-Final	1	1	10	5	99	0	1	1	8	0
2012	CGY	West Semi-Final	1	1	36	22	363	2	0	2	8	0
2012	CGY	West Final	0	-	-	-	-	-	-	-	-	-
2013	CGY	West Final	1	0	11	5	90	1	0	2	8	0
2014	CGY	West Final	1	0	0	-	-	-	-	0	-	-
2015	CGY	West Semi-Final	1	0	0	-	-	-	-	0	-	-
2015	CGY	West Final	1	0	0	-	-	-	-	0	-	-
2016	CGY	West Final	1	0	0	-	-	-	-	0	-	-
2017	OTT	East Semi-Final	1	0	0	-	-	-	-	0	-	-
2018	SSK	West Semi-Final	1	0	0	-	-	-	-	0	-	-
CFL totals			12	2	57	32	552	3	1	6	26	0

Grey Cup				Passing					Rushing		
Year	Team	GP	GS	Att	Cmp	Yards	TD	Int	Att	Yards	TD
2007	SSK	0	-	-	-	-	-	-	-	-	-
2012	CGY	0	-	-	-	-	-	-	-	-	-
2014	CGY	1	0	0	-	-	-	-	3	3	2
2016	CGY	1	0	0	-	-	-	-	0	-	-
CFL totals		1	0	0	-	-	-	-	3	3	2

== Coaching career ==
Tate entered the coaching ranks with Coastal Carolina University in 2018 as a defensive coach. Tate described the position by saying, "It was a desk job, basically." After playing again with the Roughriders at the end of 2018, Tate became quarterbacks coach for the BC Lions under head coach DeVone Claybrooks. Following the season and Claybrooks' firing, Tate became a multi-positional coach for The Spring League. Tate coached receivers, tight ends, and running backs for the Alphas, and was involved in a sideline fight with Conquerors quarterback Justin McMillan during week 2.

Tate spent the 2021 season as the quarterbacks coach at UT Martin before joining the Northern Iowa staff as the tight ends coach. In early February 2023, Tate returned to coach in Canada, accepting a job as the receivers coach for the Saskatchewan Roughriders.

On March 5, 2024, it was announced that Tate had joined the Toronto Argonauts as an offensive assistant coach. He won the 111th Grey Cup in his first year with the Argonauts.

It was announced on January 8, 2026, that Tate had joined the Ottawa Redblacks to serve as their quarterbacks coach.
