= Warren Holloway =

American football player (born 1982)

Warren Holloway (born March 24, 1982) is an American football player who played the wide receiver position for the Iowa Hawkeyes from 2001 to 2005. He later played in the af2 league for the Everett Hawks. His only college touchdown came in his last college game, the 2005 Capital One Bowl, where quarterback Drew Tate threw a 56-yard pass to Holloway as time expired in the fourth quarter, giving Iowa a 30–25 victory over LSU.

After trying to make it into a few Canadian teams, Warren retired from professional football. He lived in Chicago working in project management and is now pursuing a Doctorate of Physical Therapy at Rosalind Franklin University of Medicine and Science in North Chicago, Illinois.
