= 2004 Sugar Bowl =

College football bowl game and BCS National Championship

2004 Nokia Sugar Bowl
- BCS National Championship Game; 70th Sugar Bowl
Oklahoma Sooners	LSU Tigers
(12–1)	(12–1)
Big 12	SEC
14	21
Head coach: Bob Stoops	Head coach: Nick Saban
AP / Coaches / BCS; 3 / 3 / 1	AP / Coaches / BCS; 2 / 2 / 2
	1	2	3	4	Total
Oklahoma	0	7	0	7	14
LSU	7	7	7	0	21
- Date: January 4, 2004
- Season: 2003
- Stadium: Louisiana Superdome
- Location: New Orleans, Louisiana
- MVP: LSU RB Justin Vincent
- Favorite: Oklahoma by 6½
- National anthem: Jessica Simpson
- Referee: Dennis Hennigan (Big East)
- Attendance: 79,342

United States TV coverage
- Network: ABC
- Announcers: Brent Musburger (Play-by-Play); Gary Danielson (Color Commentator); Jack Arute (Sideline Reporter); Lynn Swann (Sideline Reporter)
- Nielsen ratings: 14.8

The 2004 Nokia Sugar Bowl, the BCS National Championship Game for the 2003 college football season, was played on January 4, 2004, at the Louisiana Superdome in New Orleans, Louisiana. The teams were the Oklahoma Sooners and the LSU Tigers. The Tigers won the BCS National Championship, their second national championship in school history, defeating the Sooners by a score of 21–14.

== Set-up ==
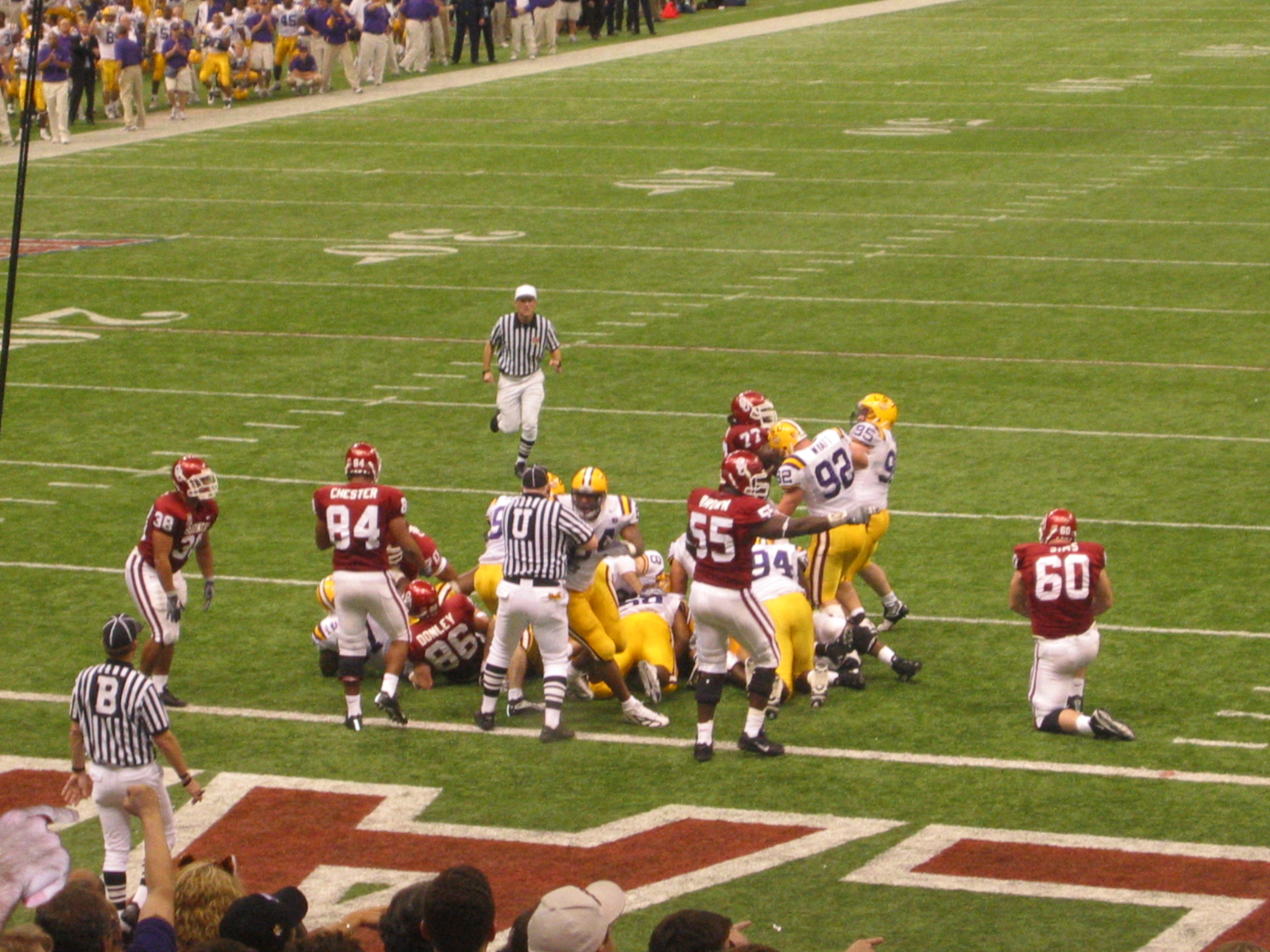
2004 Sugar Bowl, Louisiana State vs. Oklahoma; January 4, 2004

BCS #2 ranked LSU came into the national championship title game 12–1, with their one loss at home to #17 Florida 19–7. Top-ranked Oklahoma was 12–1, with the lone defeat coming at a neutral site in the Big 12 Championship Game against Kansas State 35–7. There was substantial media and fan controversy as to which teams deserved to play in the National Title game. USC was ranked #3 in the BCS standings but #1 by both of the human polls, the ESPN/USA Today Coaches Poll and the AP poll, which made up a portion of the BCS Standings. Southern Cal owned a record of 11–1, with its one loss coming in triple overtime at unranked Cal 34–31.

Once the game commenced, LSU's #1 ranked defense held the country's most prolific offense, which had averaged 45.2 points and 461 yards per game, to 154 total yards (32 in the first half) and just one touchdown until midway though the fourth quarter. The Sooners' Heisman Trophy-winning QB Jason White completed only 13 of his 37 passing attempts for just 102 yards. He was also sacked seven times and intercepted twice. LSU's offense was largely supplied by freshman running back and Sugar Bowl MVP Justin Vincent, who rushed for 117 yards and a touchdown.

As a result, LSU won their second national championship and first since 1958. The majority of the coaches voted LSU National Champions as contractually required by the BCS. There were three dissenting coaches (Ron Turner of Illinois, Mike Bellotti of Oregon and Lou Holtz of South Carolina) who voted USC #1. BCS #3 USC won the Rose Bowl against #4 ranked Michigan and was voted the National Champion in the AP Poll, resulting in a split national championship - the last time this has happened.

== Scoring summary ==
Scoring play	Score
1st quarter
LSU - Skyler Green 24-yard run (Ryan Gaudet kick). 11:38	LSU 7–0
2nd quarter
OU - Kejuan Jones 1-yard run (Trey DiCarlo kick). 7:31	Tie 7–7
LSU - Justin Vincent 16-yard run (Gaudet kick). 4:21	LSU 14–7
3rd quarter
LSU - Marcus Spears 20-yard interception return (Gaudet kick). 14:13	LSU 21–7
4th quarter
OU - Jones 1-yard run (DiCarlo kick). 11:01	LSU 21–14

== Relevant bowl records ==
- The attendance of 79,342 became the largest ever to see a game in the Superdome. That figure has since been surpassed by the 2008 BCS National Championship Game (79,651).
- The team that led at halftime had won 10 of 11 Sugar Bowl games.
- LSU improved its record to 5–7 in Sugar Bowl games.
- The SEC improved its record to 34–29–1 in Sugar Bowl games.
