= 1999–2000 NCAA football bowl games =

College football postseason game series

1999–00 NCAA football bowl games
- Season: 1999
- Number of bowls: 23
- Bowl games: December 18, 1999 – January 4, 2000
- National Championship: Sugar Bowl
- Location of Championship: Louisiana Superdome; New Orleans, LA
- Champions: Florida State
Bowl record by conference
Conference	Bowls	Record	Number of teams in final AP poll
SEC	8	4–4 (0.500)	7
Big Ten	7	5–2 (0.714)	7
Big 12	6	3–3 (0.500)	4
ACC	5	2–3 (0.400)	2
Pac-10	5	1–4 (0.200)	1
Big East	4	2–2 (0.500)	2
WAC	3	2–1 (0.667)	0
CUSA	3	1–2 (0.333)	1
MW	3	1–2 (0.333)	0
Big West	1	1–0 (1.000)	0
MAC	1	1–0 (1.000)	1

The 1999–2000 NCAA football bowl games concluded the 1999 NCAA Division I-A football season. In the second year of the Bowl Championship Series (BCS) era, Florida State defeated Virginia Tech in the 2000 Sugar Bowl, designated as the BCS National Championship Game for the 1999 season.

A total of 23 bowl games were played between December 18, 1999 and January 4, 2000 by 46 bowl-eligible teams. One new bowl was established for the 1999–2000 season: the Mobile Alabama Bowl (now known as the 68 Ventures Bowl).

== Team selections ==
=== BCS top 15 standings and bowl games ===
Rank	Team	Conference and standing	Bowl game
1	Florida State	ACC champions	Sugar Bowl (BCS National Championship)
2	Virginia Tech	Big East champions	Sugar Bowl (BCS National Championship)
3	Nebraska	Big 12 Champions	Fiesta Bowl
4	Alabama	SEC Champions	Orange Bowl
5	Tennessee	SEC Eastern Division second place	Fiesta Bowl
6	Kansas State	Co-Big 12 North Division Champions	Holiday Bowl
7	Wisconsin	Big Ten Champions	Rose Bowl
8	Michigan	Big Ten second place (tie)	Orange Bowl
9	Michigan State	Big Ten second place (tie)	Citrus Bowl
10	Florida	SEC Eastern Division champions	Citrus Bowl
11	Penn State	Big Ten fourth place (tie)	Alamo Bowl
12	Marshall	MAC Champions	Motor City Bowl
13	Minnesota	Big Ten fourth place (tie)	Sun Bowl
14	Texas A&M	Big 12 South Division second place (tie)	Alamo Bowl
15	Texas	Big 12 South Division Champions	Cotton Bowl

=== Conference champions' bowl games ===
Rankings are per the final BCS standings.

Conference	Champion	Rank	Bowl game
ACC	Florida State	1	Sugar Bowl (BCS National Championship)
Big East	Virginia Tech	2	Sugar Bowl (BCS National Championship)
Big Ten	Wisconsin	7	Rose Bowl
Big 12	Nebraska	3	Fiesta Bowl
Big West	Boise State	—	Humanitarian Bowl
Conference USA	Southern Miss	—	Liberty Bowl
MAC	Marshall	12	Motor City Bowl
Mountain West†	Utah	—	Las Vegas Bowl
Mountain West†	BYU	—	Motor City Bowl
Mountain West†	Colorado State	—	Liberty Bowl
Pac-10	Stanford	—	Rose Bowl
SEC	Alabama	4	Orange Bowl
WAC†	Hawaii	—	Oahu Bowl
WAC†	TCU	—	Mobile Alabama Bowl
WAC†	Fresno State	—	Las Vegas Bowl

† denotes a conference that named co-champions

=== Bowl eligible teams ===
- ACC (5): Clemson, Florida State, Georgia Tech, Virginia, Wake Forest
- Big East (4): Boston College, Miami (FL), Syracuse, Virginia Tech
- Big Ten (7): Illinois, Michigan, Michigan State, Minnesota, Penn State, Purdue, Wisconsin
- Big 12 (6): Colorado, Kansas State, Nebraska, Oklahoma, Texas, Texas A&M
- Big West (1): Boise State
- Conference USA (3): East Carolina, Louisville, Southern Miss
- MAC (1): Marshall
- Mountain West (3): BYU, Colorado State, Utah
- Pac-10 (5): Arizona State, Oregon, Stanford, Oregon State, Washington
- SEC (8) : Alabama, Arkansas, Florida, Georgia, Kentucky, Ole Miss, Mississippi State, Tennessee
- WAC (3): Fresno State, Hawaii, TCU

== Non-BCS bowls ==
Date	Time	Game	Site	Television	Teams	Affiliations	Result
Dec 18	6:00 PM	Las Vegas Bowl	Sam Boyd Stadium; Las Vegas, NV	ESPN2	Utah Utes; Fresno State Bulldogs	Mountain West; WAC	Utah 17; Fresno State 16
Dec 22	7:30 PM	Mobile Alabama Bowl	Ladd–Peebles Stadium; Mobile, AL	ESPN2	TCU Horned Frogs; No. 20 East Carolina Pirates	WAC; Conference USA	TCU 28; East Carolina 14
Dec 25	3:30 PM	Aloha Bowl	Aloha Stadium; Honolulu, HI	ABC	Wake Forest Demon Deacons; Arizona State Sun Devils	ACC; Pac-10	Wake Forest 23; Arizona State 3
Dec 25	8:30 PM	Oahu Bowl	Aloha Stadium; Honolulu, HI	ESPN	Hawaii Rainbow Warriors; Oregon State Beavers	WAC; Pac-10	Hawaii 23; Oregon State 17
Dec 27	2:30 PM	Motor City Bowl	Pontiac Silverdome; Pontiac, MI	ESPN	No. 11 Marshall Thundering Herd; BYU Cougars	MAC; Mountain West	Marshall 21; BYU 3
Dec 28	7:30 PM	Alamo Bowl	Alamodome; San Antonio, TX	ESPN	No. 13 Penn State Nittany Lions; No. 18 Texas A&M Aggies	Big Ten; Big 12	Penn State 24; Texas A&M 0
Dec 29	4:00 PM	Music City Bowl	Adelphia Coliseum; Nashville, TN	ESPN	Syracuse Orangemen; Kentucky Wildcats	Big East; SEC	Syracuse 20; Kentucky 13
Dec 29	8:00 PM	Holiday Bowl	Qualcomm Stadium; San Diego, CA	ESPN	No. 7 Kansas State Wildcats; Washington Huskies	Big 12; Pac-10	Kansas State 24; Washington 20
Dec 30	3:00 PM	Humanitarian Bowl	Bronco Stadium; Boise, ID	ESPN2	Boise State Broncos; Louisville Cardinals	Big West; Conference USA	Boise State 34; Louisville 31
Dec 30	7:00 PM	MicronPC Bowl	Pro Player Stadium; Miami Gardens, FL	TBS	Illinois Fighting Illini; Virginia Cavaliers	Big Ten; ACC	Illinois 63; Virginia 21
Dec 30	7:30 PM	Peach Bowl	Georgia Dome; Atlanta, GA	ESPN	No. 15 Mississippi State Bulldogs; Clemson Tigers	SEC; ACC	Mississippi State 17; Clemson 7
Dec 31	1:30 PM	Insight.com Bowl	Arizona Stadium; Tucson, AZ	ESPN	Colorado Buffaloes; No. 25 Boston College Eagles	Big 12; Big East	Colorado 62; Boston College 28
Dec 31	2:15 PM	Sun Bowl	Sun Bowl; El Paso, TX	CBS	Oregon Ducks; No. 12 Minnesota Golden Gophers	Pac-10; Big Ten	Oregon 24; Minnesota 20
Dec 31	5:00 PM	Liberty Bowl	Liberty Bowl Memorial Stadium; Memphis, TN	ESPN	No. 16 Southern Miss Golden Eagles; Colorado State Rams	Conference USA; Mountain West	Southern Miss 23; Colorado State 17
Dec 31	8:30 PM	Independence Bowl	Independence Stadium; Shreveport, LA	ESPN	Ole Miss Rebels; Oklahoma Sooners	SEC; Big 12	Ole Miss 27; Oklahoma 25
Jan 1	11:00 AM	Outback Bowl	Raymond James Stadium; Tampa, FL	ESPN	No. 21 Georgia Bulldogs; No. 19 Purdue Boilermakers	SEC; Big Ten	Georgia 28; Purdue 25 (OT)
Jan 1	11:00 AM	Cotton Bowl Classic	Cotton Bowl; Dallas, TX	Fox	No. 24 Arkansas Razorbacks; No. 14 Texas Longhorns	SEC; Big 12	Arkansas 27; Texas 6
Jan 1	12:30 PM	Gator Bowl	Alltel Stadium; Jacksonville, FL	NBC	No. 23 Miami (FL) Hurricanes; No. 17 Georgia Tech Yellow Jackets	Big East; ACC	Miami (FL) 28; Georgia Tech 13
Jan 1	1:00 PM	Florida Citrus Bowl	Florida Citrus Bowl; Orlando, FL	ABC	No. 9 Michigan State Spartans; No. 10 Florida Gators	Big Ten; SEC	Michigan State 37; Florida 34
Rankings from AP Poll released prior to the game. All times are in Eastern Time.

== BCS bowls ==
Each of the games in the following table was televised by ABC.

Date	Time	Game	Site	Teams	Affiliations	Result
Jan 1	4:30 PM	Rose Bowl	Rose Bowl; Pasadena, CA	No. 4 Wisconsin Badgers; No. 22 Stanford Cardinal	Big Ten; Pac-10	Wisconsin 17; Stanford 9
Jan 1	8:30 PM	Orange Bowl	Pro Player Stadium; Miami Gardens, FL	No. 8 Michigan Wolverines; No. 5 Alabama Crimson Tide	Big Ten; SEC	Michigan 35; Alabama 34 (OT)
Jan 2	8:00 PM	Fiesta Bowl	Sun Devil Stadium; Tempe, AZ	No. 3 Nebraska Cornhuskers; No. 6 Tennessee Volunteers	Big 12; SEC	Nebraska 31; Tennessee 21
Jan 4	8:00 PM	Sugar Bowl (BCS National Championship Game)	Louisiana Superdome; New Orleans, LA	No. 1 Florida State Seminoles; No. 2 Virginia Tech Hokies	ACC; Big East	Florida State 46; Virginia Tech 29
Rankings from AP Poll released prior to the game. All times are in Eastern Time.
