= 1999 Arizona Wildcats football team =

American college football season

1999 Arizona Wildcats football
- Conference: Pacific-10 Conference
- Record: 6–6 (3–5 Pac-10)
- Head coach: Dick Tomey (13th season)
- Offensive coordinator: Dino Babers (2nd season)
- Offensive scheme: Spread
- Defensive coordinator: Rich Ellerson (3rd season)
- Base defense: 4–3
- Home stadium: Arizona Stadium

1999 Pacific-10 Conference football standings
	Conf.			Overall
Team	W		L	W		L
Stanford $	7	–	1	8	–	4
No. 19 Oregon	6	–	2	9	–	3
Washington	6	–	2	7	–	5
Arizona State	5	–	3	6	–	6
Oregon State	4	–	4	7	–	5
Arizona	3	–	5	6	–	6
USC	3	–	5	6	–	6
California	3	–	5	4	–	7
UCLA	2	–	6	4	–	7
Washington State	1	–	7	3	–	9
$ – BCS representative as conference champion; Cal later vacated 4 wins (3 in conference) due to NCAA sanctions.; Rankings from AP Poll

The 1999 Arizona Wildcats football team represented the University of Arizona as a member of the Pacific-10 Conference (Pac-10) during the 1999 NCAA Division I-A football season. Led by head coach Dick Tomey in his 13th season, the Wildcats finished with a 6–6 record (3–5 against Pac-10 opponents) and missed out on a bowl game.

After entering the year with high expectations after a dominant 1998 season, the Wildcats were outplayed and blown out by Penn State in the opener and never fully recovered. They were 5–2 and 6–3 at different points during the year, but would lose out, including a rivalry loss to Arizona State to end the season, which knocked them out of the postseason picture.

== Schedule ==
Date	Time	Opponent	Rank	Site	TV	Result	Attendance
August 28	12:30 p.m.	at No. 4 Penn State*	No. 3	Beaver Stadium; State College, PA (Pigskin Classic, College GameDay)	ABC	L 7–41	97,168
September 5	4:30 p.m.	at TCU*	No. 15	Amon G. Carter Stadium; Fort Worth, TX	FSN	W 35–31	34,612
September 11	7:00 p.m.	Middle Tennessee State*	No. 19	Arizona Stadium; Tucson, AZ	KTTU	W 34–19	48,573
September 18	7:15 p.m.	Stanford	No. 19	Arizona Stadium; Tucson, AZ	FSN	L 22–50	47,273
September 25	1:00 p.m.	at Washington State		Martin Stadium; Pullman, WA	FSN	W 30–24	26,787
October 9	12:30 p.m.	No. 22 USC		Arizona Stadium; Tucson, AZ	ABC	W 31–24	51,418
October 16	7:15 p.m.	UTEP*		Arizona Stadium; Tucson, AZ	FSAZ	W 34–21	47,776
October 23	7:15 p.m.	Oregon		Arizona Stadium; Tucson, AZ	FSN	L 41–44	55,251
October 30	7:00 p.m.	at UCLA		Rose Bowl; Pasadena, CA	FSN	W 33–7	42,612
November 6	1:30 p.m.	Washington^{†}		Arizona Stadium; Tucson, AZ	ABC/FSN	L 25–33	56,614
November 13	8:15 p.m.	at Oregon State		Reser Stadium; Corvallis, OR	FSN	L 20–28	33,314
November 27	11:00 a.m.	at Arizona State		Sun Devil Stadium; Tempe, AZ (rivalry)	ABC/FSN	L 27–42	68,102
*Non-conference game; ^{†}Homecoming; Rankings from AP Poll released prior to the game; All times are in Mountain time

== Rankings ==
Ranking movements Legend: ██ Increase in ranking ██ Decrease in ranking — = Not ranked ( ) = First-place votes
	Week																
Poll	Pre	1	2	3	4	5	6	7	8	9	10	11	12	13	14	15	Final
AP	4 (1)	15	19	19	—	—	—	—	—	—	—	—	—	—	—	—	—
Coaches Poll	3 (2)	*	15	17	—	—	—	—	—	—	—	—	—	—	—	—	—
BCS	Not released									—	—	—	—	—	—	—	Not released

== Before the season ==
Arizona completed the 1998 season with a 12–1 record and defeated Nebraska in the Holiday Bowl. Many fans have rated the season as the best in school history.

The team entered the 1999 season with many of their offensive starters returning and hoped to improve from the previous season and contend for the Pac-10 title and a chance to finally earn a spot for the Rose Bowl that has eluded them during the decade, as well as being contenders for a potential national championship.

Tomey brought in a top recruiting class to the program in an effort to help the team move one step closer to achieving its goals. By the preseason, the Wildcats were ranked third in the polls, which was the highest in team history to start a season.

== Game summaries ==
=== at No. 4 Penn State ===
No. 3 Arizona Wildcats (0–0) at No. 4 Penn State Nittany Lions (0–0) – Game summary

Quarter	1	2	3	4	Total
No. 3 Wildcats	0	0	0	7	7
No. 4 Nittany Lions	14	17	10	0	41

at Beaver Stadium • State College, PA

- Date: August 28, 1999
- Game time: 10:00 A.M.
- Game weather: Mostly Cloudy, 79 °F (26 °C)
- Game attendance: 97,168
- TV: ABC

Game information

First quarter

- (12:04) PSU – Chafie Fields 37-yard pass from Kevin Thompson, Travis Forney kick (Penn State 7–0)
- (9:11) PSU – Chafie Fields 70-yard run, Travis Forney kick (Penn State 14–0)

Second quarter

- (12:47) PSU – Travis Forney 31-yard field goal (Penn State 17–0)
- (8:35) PSU – Larry Johnson 60-yard pass from Kevin Thompson, Travis Forney kick (Penn State 24–0)
- (5:13) PSU – Aaron Harris 15-yard run, Travis Forney kick (Penn State 31–0)

Third quarter

- (4:59) PSU – Travis Forney 47-yard field goal (Penn State 34–0)
- (0:36) PSU – Omar Easy 1-yard run, Travis Forney kick (Penn State 41–0)

Fourth quarter

- (0:48) ARIZ – Leo Mills 1-yard run, Mark McDonald kick (Penn State 41–7)

Statistics	ARIZ	PSU
First downs	16	19
Total yards	356	504
Rushing yards	36–124	44–262
Passing yards	232	242
Passing: Comp–Att–Int	25–35–0	11–18–1
Time of possession	33:24	26:36

Team	Category	Player	Statistics
Arizona	Passing	Keith Smith	17/21, 128 yards
Arizona	Rushing	Leo Mills	9 carries, 54 yards, TD
Arizona	Receiving	Dennis Northcutt	8 receptions, 86 yards
Penn State	Passing	Kevin Thompson	5/8, 135 yards, 2 TD, INT
Penn State	Rushing	Chafie Fields	3 carries, 110 yards, TD
Penn State	Receiving	Chafie Fields	3 receptions, 76 yards, TD

Arizona began the season with a trip to Penn State. It was the first ever meeting between the Wildcats and Nittany Lions. Due to the highly anticipated matchup between the top-5 teams (Arizona ranked third and Penn State fourth), ESPN's College GameDay came to State College the morning of the game. It was the first time that GameDay involved an Arizona game.

In the game, in front of a national television audience (broadcast on ABC), the Wildcats watched as they would be dominated by the Lions in all phases. The only bright spot for Arizona was a touchdown scored in the game's final minute that prevented a shutout. The blowout loss ended Arizona's chances for a national title and dropped out of the top ten polls.

After the game, Tomey said that the team was largely affected by the loud atmosphere at Penn State, turnovers, and poor coaching decisions. He also said that it was difficult to beat a team with a legendary coach and that the result would be different had the Wildcats played the Lions at home instead.

=== at TCU ===
No. 15 Arizona Wildcats (0–1) at TCU Horned Frogs (0–0) – Game summary

Quarter	1	2	3	4	Total
No. 15 Wildcats	7	0	21	7	35
Horned Frogs	9	14	5	3	31

at Amon G. Carter Stadium • Fort Worth, TX

- Date: September 5, 1999
- Game time: 4:30 P.M.
- Game weather: Mostly Cloudy, 78 °F (26 °C)
- Game attendance: 34,612
- Referee: Frank White
- TV: Fox Sports Net

Game information

First quarter

- (14:47) TCU – Team safety (TCU 2–0)
- (3:05) TCU – LaDainian Tomlinson 18-yard run, Chris Kaylakie kick (Drive: 6 plays, 53 yards, 2:30; TCU 9–0)
- (0:29) ARIZ – Bobby Wade 8-yard pass from Keith Smith, Mark McDonald kick (Drive: 7 plays, 74 yards, 2:36; TCU 9–7)

Second quarter

- (11:44) TCU – Kendrick Patterson 51-yard fumble return, Chris Kaylakie kick (TCU 16–7)
- (5:56) TCU – Mike Scarborough 8-yard pass from Pat Batteaux, Chris Kaylakie kick (Drive: 5 plays, 32 yards, 2:25; TCU 23–7)

Third quarter

- (12:21) TCU – Team safety (TCU 25–7)
- (9:19) ARIZ – Dennis Northcutt 38-yard pass from Ortege Jenkins, kick failed (Drive: 2 plays, 46 yards, 0:45; TCU 25–13)
- (7:31) ARIZ – Brandon Manumaleuna 22-yard pass from Ortege Jenkins, Chris Palic kick (Drive: 3 plays, 40 yards, 0:40; TCU 25–20)
- (5:33) ARIZ – Dennis Northcutt 59-yard pass from Ortege Jenkins, Ortege Jenkins run for two-point conversion (Drive: 1 play, 59 yards, 0:11; Arizona 28–25)
- (2:11) TCU – Chris Kaylakie 43-yard field goal (Drive: 5 plays, 11 yards, 3:22; Tied 28–28)

Fourth quarter

- (13:18) TCU – Chris Kaylakie 44-yard field goal (Drive: 8 plays, 12 yards, 3:39; TCU 31–28)
- (2:10) ARIZ – Dennis Northcutt 30-yard pass from Keith Smith, Chris Palic kick (Drive: 6 plays, 84 yards, 5:53; Arizona 35–31)

Statistics	ARIZ	TCU
First downs	17	16
Total yards	337	57
Rushing yards	37–14	47–224
Passing yards	232	242
Passing: Comp–Att–Int	17–25–1	13–21–0
Time of possession	29:36	30:24

Team	Category	Player	Statistics
Arizona	Passing	Keith Smith	12/16, 174 yards, 2 TD
Arizona	Rushing	Trung Canidate	14 carries, 56 yards
Arizona	Receiving	Dennis Northcutt	10 receptions, 257 yards, 3 TD
TCU	Passing	Pat Batteaux	12/20, 50 yards, TD
TCU	Rushing	LaDainian Tomlinson	28 carries, 170 yards, TD
TCU	Receiving	Terran Williams	2 receptions, 13 yards

After being destroyed at Penn State, the Wildcats stayed on the road for their next game at TCU in another first-meeting matchup. In the first half, the story was the same for Arizona, as the Horned Frogs would lead 25-7 at halftime. By the second half, Arizona began coming back with touchdowns and took the lead late in the fourth quarter. The Wildcats would stop TCU on their final drive to complete the comeback victory, which may have saved the season for Arizona.

=== vs Middle Tennessee ===
Middle Tennessee Blue Raiders (0–1) vs No. 19 Arizona Wildcats (1–1) – Game summary

Quarter	1	2	3	4	Total
Blue Raiders	0	0	0	19	19
No. 19 Wildcats	14	6	7	7	34

at Arizona Stadium • Tucson, AZ

- Date: September 11, 1999
- Game time: 7:00 P.M.
- Game weather: Partly Cloudy, 91 °F (33 °C)
- Game attendance: 48,573
- Referee: Chuck McFerrin
- TV: KTTU

Game information

First quarter

- (9:42) ARIZ – Jim Wendler 1-yard run, Mark McDonald kick (Drive: 16 plays, 80 yards, 7:38; Arizona 7–0)
- (2:46) ARIZ – Dennis Northcutt 80-yard punt return, Mark McDonald kick (Arizona 14–0)

Second quarter

- (3:06) ARIZ – Ortege Jenkins 8-yard run, kick failed (Drive: 16 plays, 80 yards, 7:38; Arizona 20–0)

Third quarter

- (7:00) ARIZ – Lance Briggs 1-yard run, Mark McDonald kick (Drive: 16 plays, 80 yards, 7:38; Arizona 27–0)

Fourth quarter

- (14:55) ARIZ – Marvin Brown 26-yard pass from Ortege Jenkins, Mark McDonald kick (Drive: 11 plays, 30 yards, 3:54; Arizona 34–0)
- (10:31) MTSU – Jamison Palmer 39-yard run, Keegan Ray kick (Drive: 16 plays, 80 yards, 7:38; Arizona 34–7)
- (5:08) MTSU – Wes Counts 1-yard run, kick failed (Drive: 16 plays, 80 yards, 7:38; Arizona 34–13)
- (0:00) MTSU – Hansford Johnson 15-yard pass from Wes Counts, two-point pass failed (Drive: 11 plays, 30 yards, 3:54; Arizona 34–19)

Statistics	MTSU	ARIZ
First downs	21	19
Total yards	304	400
Rushing yards	23–128	8–265
Passing yards	176	135
Passing: Comp–Att–Int	26–37–0	17–24–0
Time of possession	26:56	33:04

Team	Category	Player	Statistics
Middle Tennessee	Passing	Wes Counts	26/37, 176 yards, TD
Middle Tennessee	Rushing	Jamison Palmer	10 carries, 72 yards, TD
Middle Tennessee	Receiving	Tyrone Calico	9 receptions, 79 yards
Arizona	Passing	Ortege Jenkins	16/23, 118 yards, TD
Arizona	Rushing	Trung Canidate	16 carries, 102 yards
Arizona	Receiving	Dennis Northcutt	5 receptions, 40 yards

=== vs Stanford ===
Stanford Cardinal (1–1) vs No. 19 Arizona Wildcats (2–1) – Game summary

Quarter	1	2	3	4	Total
Cardinal	10	20	0	20	50
No. 19 Wildcats	7	0	15	0	22

at Arizona Stadium • Tucson, AZ

- Date: September 18, 1999
- Game time: 7:15 P.M.
- Game weather: Partly Cloudy, 88 °F (31 °C)
- Game attendance: 47,273
- TV: Fox Sports Net

Game information

First quarter

- (10:16) ARIZ – Brad Brennan 21-yard pass from Ortege Jenkins, Mark McDonald kick (Drive: 5 plays, 71 yards, 3:02; Arizona 7–0)
- (6:30) STAN – Mike Biselli 21-yard field goal (Drive: 11 plays, 77 yards, 3:46; Arizona 7–3)
- (0:17) STAN – Kerry Carter 5-yard run, Mike Biselli kick (Drive: 6 plays, 84 yards, 1:52; Stanford 10–7)

Second quarter

- (10:57) STAN – Todd Husak 1-yard run, Mike Biselli kick (Drive: 7 plays, 44 yards, 2:59; Stanford 17–7)
- (10:16) STAN – Kerry Carter 8-yard run, Mike Biselli kick (Drive: 2 plays, 20 yards, 0:28; Utah 24–7)
- (2:12) STAN – Kerry Carter 3-yard run, kick failed (Drive: 11 plays, 99 yards, 4:10; Utah 30–7)

Third quarter

- (14:15) ARIZ – Dennis Northcutt 7-yard pass from Ortege Jenkins, Mark McDonald kick (Drive: 2 plays, 80 yards, 0:45; Utah 30–14)
- (1:01) ARIZ – Dennis Northcutt 15-yard pass from Ortege Jenkins, Ortege Jenkins run for two-point conversion (Drive: 6 plays, 56 yards, 2:27; Utah 30–22)

Fourth quarter

- (12:49) STAN – Dave Davis 10-yard pass from Todd Husak, kick failed (Drive: 9 plays, 65 yards, 3:12; Stanford 36–22)
- (10:20) STAN – Casey Moore 49-yard run, Mike Biselli kick (Drive: 5 plays, 75 yards, 1:56; Stanford 43–22)
- (7:05) STAN – Coy Wire 44-yard run, Mike Biselli kick (Drive: 3 plays, 52 yards, 1:28; Stanford 50–22)

Statistics	STAN	ARIZ
First downs	21	18
Total yards	578	428
Rushing yards	39–214	36–113
Passing yards	364	315
Passing: Comp–Att–Int	21–35–0	20–36–3
Time of possession	28:52	31:08

Team	Category	Player	Statistics
Stanford	Passing	Todd Husak	21/35, 364 yards, TD
Stanford	Rushing	Kerry Carter	20 carries, 79 yards, 3 TD
Stanford	Receiving	Troy Walters	8 receptions, 168 yards
Arizona	Passing	Ortege Jenkins	15/23, 200 yards, 3 TD, INT
Arizona	Rushing	Trung Canidate	14 carries, 123 yards
Arizona	Receiving	Dennis Northcutt	8 receptions, 139 yards, 2 TD

After Arizona defeated Middle Tennessee in their home opener in yet another first-meeting game, they hosted Stanford. The Wildcats would score first, but would make mistakes that led to the Cardinal pulling away by halftime. Arizona made a comeback in the third quarter to cut into Stanford's lead. However, in the fourth quarter, the Cardinal broke the game open to give the Wildcats their second loss of the season and jeopardizing their Rose Bowl hopes. Also, it was Arizona's first loss to Stanford since 1990, snapping a six-game winning streak. Stanford would ultimately go on to appear in the Rose Bowl.

=== at Washington State ===
Arizona Wildcats (2–2) at Washington State Cougars (0–3) – Game summary

Quarter	1	2	3	4	Total
Wildcats	7	0	10	13	30
Cougars	0	10	0	14	24

at Martin Stadium • Pullman, WA

- Date: September 25, 1999
- Game time: 1:00 P.M.
- Game weather: Overcast, dusty, 60 °F (16 °C)
- Game attendance: 26,787
- Referee: Pat Flood
- TV: Fox Sports Net

Game information

First quarter

- (6:20) ARIZ – Trung Canidate 1-yard run, Mark McDonald kick (Drive: 9 plays, 56 yards, 3:34; Arizona 7–0)

Second quarter

- (11:31) WSU – Farwan Zubedi 11-yard pass from Steve Birnbaum, Rian Lindell kick (Drive: 9 plays, 64 yards, 3:51; Tied 7–7)
- (2:46) WSU – Rian Lindell 52-yard field goal (Drive: 4 plays, 6 yards, 0:55; Washington State 10–7)

Third quarter

- (11:20) ARIZ – Team safety (Washington State 10–9)
- (5:24) ARIZ – Trung Canidate 2-yard run, Keith Smith two-point pass to Brandon Manumaleuna (Drive: 3 plays, 13 yards, 1:13; Arizona 17–9)

Fourth quarter

- (10:15) WSU – Deon Burnett 2-yard run, Rian Lindell kick (Drive: 7 plays, 80 yards, 2:17; Tied 17–17)
- (4:39) ARIZ – Trung Canidate 4-yard run, Mark McDonald kick (Drive: 14 plays, 80 yards, 5:36; Arizona 24–17)
- (4:14) WSU – Deon Burnett 55-yard run, Rian Lindell kick (Drive: 2 plays, 55 yards, 0:25; Tied 24–24)
- (0:00) ARIZ – Bobby Wade 42-yard pass from Keith Smith (Drive: 8 plays, 80 yards, 1:56; Arizona 30–24)

Statistics	ARIZ	WSU
First downs	25	13
Total yards	500	318
Rushing yards	60–249	30–153
Passing yards	251	165
Passing: Comp–Att–Int	18–33–0	15–24–0
Time of possession	38:26	21:34

Team	Category	Player	Statistics
Arizona	Passing	Keith Smith	12/25, 190 yards, TD
Arizona	Rushing	Trung Canidate	34 carries, 158 yards, 3 TD
Arizona	Receiving	Dennis Northcutt	5 receptions, 107 yards
Washington State	Passing	Steve Birnbaum	12/19, 112 yards, TD
Washington State	Rushing	Deon Burnett	13 carries, 96 yards, 2 TD
Washington State	Receiving	Leaf Hackett	7 receptions, 97 yards

The Wildcats traveled to Washington State looking to get back into the win column. In a back and forth battle with the Cougars, the Wildcats drove to midfield in the final seconds. Quarterback Keith Smith threw a Hail Mary pass that was caught in the end zone by receiver Bobby Wade as time expired to give Arizona the wild victory. The winning play was known to fans as the "Hail Bobby".

=== vs No. 22 USC ===
No. 22 USC Trojans (3–1) vs Arizona Wildcats (3–2) – Game summary

Quarter	1	2	3	4	Total
No. 22 Trojans	0	10	7	7	24
Wildcats	7	3	7	14	31

at Arizona Stadium • Tucson, AZ

- Date: October 9, 1999
- Game time: 12:30 P.M.
- Game weather: Sunny, 90 °F (32 °C)
- Game attendance: 51,418
- Referee: Pat Flood
- TV: ABC

Game information

First quarter

- (10:20) ARIZ – Keith Smith 57-yard run, Mark McDonald kick (Drive: 4 plays, 95 yards, 1:38; Arizona 7–0)

Second quarter

- (14:08) USC – Antuan Simmons 44-yard fumble return, David Newbury kick (Tied 7–7)
- (5:14) ARIZ – Mark McDonald 43-yard field goal (Drive: 7 plays, 54 yards, 2:09; Arizona 10–7)
- (0:04) USC – David Newbury 40-yard field goal (Drive: 8 plays, 29 yards, 1:03; Tied 10–10)

Third quarter

- (10:26) USC – Windrell Hayes 18-yard pass from Mike Van Raaphorst, David Newbury kick (Drive: 9 plays, 79 yards, 4:34; USC 17–10)
- (0:41) ARIZ – Dennis Northcutt 17-yard pass from Keith Smith, Mark McDonald kick (Drive: 8 plays, 65 yards, 3:48; Tied 17–17)

Fourth quarter

- (11:52) ARIZ – Trung Canidate 11-yard run, Mark McDonald kick (Drive: 8 plays, 80 yards, 2:15; Arizona 24–17)
- (1:57) ARIZ – Kelvin Hunter 24-yard fumble return, Mark McDonald kick (Arizona 31–17)
- (0:28) USC – Marcell Allmond 21-yard pass from Mike Van Raaphorst, David Newbury kick (Drive: 10 plays, 80 yards, 1:29; Arizona 31–24)

Statistics	USC	ARIZ
First downs	17	23
Total yards	271	550
Rushing yards	29– -20	52–307
Passing yards	291	243
Passing: Comp–Att–Int	23–41–1	15–24–0
Time of possession	24:30	35:30

Team	Category	Player	Statistics
USC	Passing	Mike Van Raaphorst	23/41, 291 yards, 2 TD, INT
USC	Rushing	Chad Morton	14 carries, 28 yards
USC	Receiving	Windrell Hayes	9 receptions, 115 yards, TD
Arizona	Passing	Keith Smith	15/23, 243 yards, TD
Arizona	Rushing	Trung Canidate	31 carries, 194 yards, TD
Arizona	Receiving	Dennis Northcutt	8 receptions, 121 yards, TD

Arizona hosted USC (ranked 22nd) in their next game. With Trung Canidate and Dennis Northcutt leading the way, the Wildcats took control of the game and seemed to seal it on a fumble return for a touchdown. However, the Trojans scored in the final minute to cut Arizona's lead to seven, but an onside kick attempt would go out of bounds, and the Wildcats held on for the win. This would be Arizona's last home win over the Trojans until 2012.

=== vs UTEP ===
UTEP Miners (3–3) vs Arizona Wildcats (4–2) – Game summary

Quarter	1	2	3	4	Total
Miners	7	7	7	0	21
Wildcats	0	21	0	13	34

at Arizona Stadium • Tucson, AZ

- Date: October 16, 1999
- Game time: 7:15 P.M.
- Game weather: Partly Cloudy, 77 °F (25 °C)
- Game attendance: 47,776
- TV: Fox Sports Arizona

Game information

First quarter

- UTEP – Lee Mays 17-yard pass from Rocky Perez, Ricky Bishop kick (UTEP 7–0)

Second quarter

- UTEP – Lee Mays 10-yard pass from Rocky Perez, Ricky Bishop kick (UTEP 14–0)
- ARIZ – Trung Canidate 60-yard run, Mark McDonald kick (UTEP 14–7)
- ARIZ – Greg Payne Jr. 34-yard interception return, Mark McDonald kick (Tied 14–14)
- ARIZ – Eli Wnek 3-yard pass from Ortege Jenkins, Mark McDonald kick (Arizona 21–14)

Third quarter

- UTEP – Rocky Perez 7-yard run, Ricky Bishop kick (Tied 21–21)

Fourth quarter

- ARIZ – Ortege Jenkins 6-yard run, Mark McDonald kick (Arizona 28–21)
- ARIZ – Leon Callen 8-yard run, kick failed (Arizona 34–21)

Statistics	UTEP	ARIZ
First downs	19	21
Total yards	381	553
Rushing yards	32–115	52–396
Passing yards	266	157
Passing: Comp–Att–Int	20–30–1	11–19–1
Time of possession	26:55	33:05

Team	Category	Player	Statistics
UTEP	Passing	Rocky Perez	17/23, 233 yards, 2 TD
UTEP	Rushing	Paul Smith	20 carries, 63 yards
UTEP	Receiving	Lee Mays	9 receptions, 127 yards, 2 TD
Arizona	Passing	Ortege Jenkins	10/17, 113 yards, TD, INT
Arizona	Rushing	Trung Canidate	27 carries, 202 yards, TD
Arizona	Receiving	Dennis Northcutt	4 receptions, 76 yards

=== vs Oregon ===
Oregon Ducks (3–3) vs Arizona Wildcats (5–2) – Game summary

Quarter	1	2	3	4	Total
Ducks	13	11	3	17	44
Wildcats	7	14	6	14	41

at Arizona Stadium • Tucson, AZ

- Date: October 23, 1999
- Game time: 7:15 P.M.
- Game weather: Clear and dark, 80 °F (27 °C)
- Game attendance: 55,251
- Referee: Chuck McFerrin
- TV: Fox Sports Net

Game information

First quarter

- (14:45) ORE – Team safety (Oregon 2–0)
- (6:21) ORE – Josh Frankel 44-yard field goal (Drive: 11 plays, 53 yards, 3:50; Oregon 5–0)
- (6:03) ARIZ – Ortege Jenkins 65-yard run, Mark McDonald kick (Drive: 2 plays, 65 yards, 0:18; Arizona 7–5)
- (1:18) ORE – Reuben Droughns 4-yard run, Reuben Droughns run for two-point conversion (Drive: 11 plays, 68 yards, 4:45; Oregon 13–7)

Second quarter

- (9:53) ORE – Lacorey Collins 2-yard pass from A.J. Feeley, A.J. Feeley run for two-point conversion (Drive: 3 plays, 31 yards, 1:08; Oregon 21–7)
- (2:44) ARIZ – Bobby Wade 14-yard pass from Keith Smith, Mark McDonald kick (Drive: 4 plays, 80 yards, 0:47; Oregon 21–14)
- (1:16) ARIZ – Dennis Northcutt 80-yard run, Mark McDonald kick (Drive: 2 plays, 80 yards, 0:53; Tied 21–21)
- (0:00) ORE – Josh Frankel 43-yard field goal (Drive: 7 plays, 38 yards, 1:16; Oregon 24–21)

Third quarter

- (7:22) ORE – Josh Frankel 31-yard field goal (Drive: 6 plays, 11 yards, 1:53; Oregon 27–21)
- (7:06) ARIZ – Trung Canidate 60-yard run, kick failed (Drive: 1 play, 65 yards, 0:16; Tied 27–27)

Fourth quarter

- (14:48) ARIZ – Dennis Northcutt 32-yard pass from Keith Smith, Sean Keel kick (Drive: 4 plays, 78 yards, 0:21; Arizona 34–27)
- (13:58) ORE – Tony Hartley 36-yard pass from Joey Harrington, Josh Frankel kick (Drive: 2 plays, 61 yards, 0:50; Tied 34–34)
- (9:07) ARIZ – Trung Canidate 33-yard pass from Keith Smith, Sean Keel kick (Drive: 3 plays, 29 yards, 1:33; Arizona 41–34)
- (6:08) ORE – Reuben Droughns 3-yard run, Josh Frankel kick (Drive: 7 plays, 55 yards, 2:59; Tied 41–41)
- (1:04) ORE – Josh Frankel 32-yard field goal (Drive: 9 plays, 37 yards, 3:16; Oregon 44–41)

Statistics	ORE	ARIZ
First downs	26	19
Total yards	435	552
Rushing yards	53–223	34–328
Passing yards	239	270
Passing: Comp–Att–Int	13–35–2	17–35–1
Time of possession	34:34	25:26

Team	Category	Player	Statistics
Oregon	Passing	Joey Harrington	6/11, 144 yards, TD, INT
Oregon	Rushing	Reuben Droughns	45 carries, 202 yards, 2 TD
Oregon	Receiving	Tony Hartley	6 receptions, 135 yards, TD
Arizona	Passing	Keith Smith	14/28, 225 yards, 3 TD, INT
Arizona	Rushing	Trung Canidate	20 carries, 104 yards, TD
Arizona	Receiving	Dennis Northcutt	9 receptions, 140 yards, TD

The Wildcats would welcome Oregon for another big test. Arizona would compete with the Ducks all game long, with both teams trading scores, with Northcutt keeping the Wildcats in it with a pair of touchdowns. Oregon took the lead with over a minute remaining in the fourth quarter and the Wildcats had one final chance. Arizona would get into Oregon territory and ultimately miss a potential tying field goal to lose. The loss would end all chances that Arizona had to earn a Pac-10 title and Rose Bowl bid.

The Wildcats' kicker, Mark McDonald, who missed the field goal, received insults and death threats by fans, and would ultimately leave the team. He had been 1 for 10 in field goal tries, with his only make in the win over USC (McDonald had winning kicks against San Diego State and California in 1997 and was part of the Wildcats' memorable 1998 team).

=== at UCLA ===
Arizona Wildcats (5–3) at UCLA Bruins (3–4) – Game summary

Quarter	1	2	3	4	Total
Wildcats	10	10	13	0	33
Bruins	7	0	0	0	7

at Rose Bowl • Pasadena, CA

- Date: October 30, 1999
- Game time: 7:00 P.M.
- Game weather: Fair, 79 °F (26 °C)
- Game attendance: 42,612
- TV: Fox Sports Net

Game information

First quarter

- (6:51) UCLA – Brad Melsby 44-yard pass from Cory Paus, Chris Griffith kick (UCLA 7–0)
- (4:46) ARIZ – Sean Keel 31-yard field goal (Drive: 4 plays, 5 yards, 1:21; UCLA 7–3)
- (1:20) ARIZ – Trung Canidate 3-yard run, Sean Keel kick (Drive: 10 plays, 75 yards, 3:36; Arizona 10–7)

Second quarter

- (11:07) ARIZ – Brandon Manumaleuna 3-yard pass from Keith Smith, Sean Keel kick (Arizona 17–7)
- (4:28) ARIZ – Sean Keel 33-yard field goal (Drive: 4 plays, 5 yards, 1:21; Arizona 20–7)

Third quarter

- (11:09) ARIZ – Trung Canidate 19-yard run, two-point pass failed (Arizona 26–7)
- (0:53) ARIZ – Lance Briggs 48-yard run, Sean Keel kick (Arizona 33–7)

Fourth quarter

- No scoring plays

Statistics	ARIZ	UCLA
First downs	25	17
Total yards	588	234
Rushing yards	49–307	30– -31
Passing yards	281	265
Passing: Comp–Att–Int	17–31–2	16–39–0
Time of possession	31:39	28:21

Team	Category	Player	Statistics
Arizona	Passing	Keith Smith	17/29, 281 yards, TD, 2 INT
Arizona	Rushing	Trung Canidate	25 carries, 148 yards, 2 TD
Arizona	Receiving	Dennis Northcutt	7 receptions, 121 yards
UCLA	Passing	Cory Paus	13/27, 230 yards, TD
UCLA	Rushing	Keith Brown	8 carries, 20 yards
UCLA	Receiving	Freddie Mitchell	4 receptions, 42 yards

Arizona went to the Rose Bowl to face UCLA, who dealt the Wildcats their only loss in the previous season that prevented them from playing the actual Rose Bowl game. The Wildcats had a new kicker, Sean Keel, who was the backup to McDonald. Keel became the full-time kicker after McDonald decided to leave the program after missing a late game-tying field goal in the loss to Oregon and being threatened by fans. Keel would eventually be the Wildcats' primary kicker for the rest of his career.

The Wildcats would give up an early score before bouncing back with Keel making his first field goal and Canidate rushed for two touchdowns. Northcutt led the receiving corps and Arizona avenged their loss to the Bruins from the 1997-98 seasons and gave them their sixth win of the year. It was the Wildcats' first win in Pasadena since 1990 and their first sweep of the Los Angeles teams since the same year.

=== vs Washington ===
Washington Huskies (5–3) vs Arizona Wildcats (6–3) – Game summary

Quarter	1	2	3	4	Total
Huskies	0	19	0	14	33
Wildcats	3	7	7	8	25

at Arizona Stadium • Tucson, AZ

- Date: November 6, 1999
- Game time: 1:30 P.M.
- Game weather: Fair, 93 °F (34 °C)
- Game attendance: 56,614
- TV: ABC/Fox Sports Net

Game information

First quarter

- (0:33) ARIZ – Sean Keel 30-yard field goal (Arizona 3–0)

Second quarter

- (11:16) WASH – John Anderson 25-yard field goal (Tied 3–3)
- (10:50) WASH – Gerald Harris 25-yard pass from Marques Tuiasosopo, John Anderson kick (Washington 10–3)
- (5:23) WASH – John Anderson 38-yard field goal (Washington 13–3)
- (5:02) ARIZ – Trung Canidate 74-yard run, Sean Keel kick (Washington 13–10)
- (0:39) WASH – Paul Arnold 27-yard run, kick failed (Washington 19–10)

Third quarter

- (4:39) ARIZ – Marvin Brown 55-yard pass from Ortege Jenkins, Sean Keel kick (Washington 19–17)

Fourth quarter

- (4:14) WASH – Jerramy Stevens 6-yard pass from Marques Tuiasosopo, John Anderson kick (Washington 26–17)
- (3:50) WASH – Anthony Vontoure 29-yard interception return, John Anderson kick (Washington 33–17)
- (1:34) ARIZ – Ortege Jenkins 1-yard run, Keith Smith two-point pass to Brandon Manumaleuna (Washington 33–25)

Statistics	WASH	ARIZ
First downs	22	17
Total yards	350	417
Rushing yards	46–142	27–137
Passing yards	208	280
Passing: Comp–Att–Int	16–28–0	17–32–3
Time of possession	34:48	25:12

Team	Category	Player	Statistics
Washington	Passing	Marques Tuiasosopo	16/28, 208 yards, 2 TD
Washington	Rushing	Maurice Shaw	29 carries, 75 yards
Washington	Receiving	Gerald Harris	5 receptions, 92 yards, TD
Arizona	Passing	Ortege Jenkins	12/18, 198 yards, TD, INT
Arizona	Rushing	Trung Canidate	11 carries, 105 yards, TD
Arizona	Receiving	Dennis Northcutt	8 receptions, 112 yards

On homecoming day (and the home finale), the Wildcats hosted Washington, looking for a chance to clinch a bowl berth with a seventh victory. Unfortunately, mistakes would cost the Wildcats which would lead to points by the Huskies. Arizona tried to come back late, but would fall short as the Huskies got revenge on Ortege Jenkins and the Wildcats (who beat Washington the previous year on Jenkins' somersault touchdown) and officially ended Arizona's Rose Bowl hopes for good.

=== at Oregon State ===
Arizona Wildcats (6–4) at Oregon State Beavers (6–3) – Game summary

Quarter	1	2	3	4	Total
Wildcats	7	6	7	0	20
Beavers	7	7	14	0	28

at Reser Stadium • Corvallis, OR

- Date: November 13, 1999
- Game time: 8:15 P.M.
- Game weather: Fair, 58 °F (14 °C)
- Game attendance: 33,314
- TV: Fox Sports Net

Game information

First quarter

- (11:40) OSU – T.J. Houshmandzadeh 5-yard pass from Jonathan Smith, Ryan Cesca kick (Oregon State 7–0)
- (6:59) ARIZ – Steven Jackson 19-yard pass from Keith Smith, Sean Keel kick (Tied 7–7)

Second quarter

- (14:58) ARIZ – Sean Keel 34-yard field goal (Arizona 10–7)
- (13:32) OSU – Roddy Tompkins 65-yard pass from Jonathan Smith, Ryan Cesca kick (Oregon State 14–10)
- (13:09) ARIZ – Sean Keel 35-yard field goal (Drive: 4 plays, 5 yards, 1:21; Oregon State 14–13)

Third quarter

- (10:24) ARIZ – Trung Canidate 50-yard run, Sean Keel kick (Arizona 20–14)
- (8:09) OSU – Martin Maurer 1-yard pass from Jonathan Smith, Ryan Cesca kick (Oregon State 21–20)
- (3:43) OSU – Jonathan Smith 1-yard run, Ryan Cesca kick (Oregon State 28–20)

Fourth quarter

- No scoring plays

Statistics	ARIZ	OSU
First downs	24	20
Total yards	500	369
Rushing yards	48–257	29–160
Passing yards	243	209
Passing: Comp–Att–Int	17–34–2	17–41–0
Time of possession	31:58	28:02

Team	Category	Player	Statistics
Arizona	Passing	Keith Smith	13/24, 163 yards, TD, INT
Arizona	Rushing	Trung Canidate	33 carries, 221 yards, TD
Arizona	Receiving	Dennis Northcutt	8 receptions, 96 yards
Oregon State	Passing	Jonathan Smith	17/40, 209 yards, 3 TD
Oregon State	Rushing	Ken Simonton	21 carries, 149 yards
Oregon State	Receiving	Robert Prescott	6 receptions, 72 yards

=== at Arizona State ===
Arizona Wildcats (6–5) at Arizona State Sun Devils (5–5) – Game summary

Quarter	1	2	3	4	Total
Wildcats	7	7	6	7	27
Sun Devils	7	7	14	14	42

at Sun Devil Stadium • Tempe, AZ

- Date: November 27, 1999
- Game time: 11:00 A.M.
- Game weather: Fair, 67 °F (19 °C)
- Game attendance: 68,102
- TV: ABC/Fox Sports Net

Game information

First quarter

- (11:14) ASU – Richard Williams 51-yard pass from Ryan Kealy, Mike Barth kick (Arizona State 7–0)
- (5:08) ARIZ – Trung Canidate 80-yard run, Sean Keel kick (Tied 7–7)

Second quarter

- (7:18) ARIZ – Dennis Northcutt 80-yard pass from Keith Smith, Sean Keel kick (Arizona 14–7)
- (2:41) ASU – Delvon Flowers 4-yard run, Mike Barth kick (Tied 14–14)

Third quarter

- (13:41) ASU – Delvon Flowers 38-yard run, Mike Barth kick (Arizona State 21–14)
- (9:33) ASU – Todd Heap 28-yard pass from Ryan Kealy, Mike Barth kick (Arizona State 28–14)
- (1:37) ARIZ – Dennis Northcutt 81-yard punt return, kick failed (Arizona State 28–20)

Fourth quarter

- (12:28) ASU – Richard Williams 45-yard pass from John Leonard, Mike Barth kick (Arizona State 35–20)
- (8:23) ARIZ – Keith Smith 12-yard run, Sean Keel kick (Arizona State 35–27)
- (1:33) ASU – J.R. Redmond 10-yard run, Mike Barth kick (Arizona State 42–27)

Statistics	ARIZ	ASU
First downs	22	24
Total yards	468	558
Rushing yards	27–175	50–226
Passing yards	293	332
Passing: Comp–Att–Int	21–38–0	15–24–0
Time of possession	27:17	32:43

Team	Category	Player	Statistics
Arizona	Passing	Keith Smith	21/37, 293 yards, TD
Arizona	Rushing	Trung Canidate	18 carries, 158 yards, TD
Arizona	Receiving	Dennis Northcutt	8 receptions, 127 yards, TD
Arizona State	Passing	Ryan Kealy	14/22, 287 yards, 2 TD
Arizona State	Rushing	J.R. Redmond	23 carries, 112 yards, TD
Arizona State	Receiving	Todd Heap	7 receptions, 170 yards, TD

In the annual "Duel in the Desert", the Wildcats continued to look for a bowl bid as they traveled to Tempe to take on Arizona State. It was the 100th anniversary of the rivalry's first game between the teams, with both schools holding centennial celebrations.

Despite big plays by Arizona's offense, which included 80-yard touchdowns by Canidate and Northcutt (with the latter also returning a punt for a score), their defense struggled as they had trouble slowing down the Sun Devils' strong offense. The 42-27 loss led the Wildcats to ending the season with a three-game losing streak and prevented them from earning a bowl bid. ASU went on to clinch a bowl bid of their own, which was the Aloha Bowl. It was the Wildcats' first loss in Tempe since 1991.

== Awards and honors ==
- Dennis Northcutt, WR, Consensus and AP All-American, First-team All-Pac-10
- Trung Canidate, RB, First-team All-Pac-10
- Marcus Bell, LB, Second-team All-Pac-10
- Brandon Manumaleuna, TE, Second-team All-Pac-10
- Joe Tafoya, DT, Second-team All-Pac-10
- Bruce Wiggins, OL, Second-team All-Pac-10
- Steven Grace, OL, Second-team All-Pac-10

== Season notes ==
- Arizona was unable to improve from their 1998 season with a .500 record (6–6 record) in the 1999 season. The season was affected by a tough schedule, team mistakes, and poor decisions by the players and coaches. A major factor in the mediocre season was the loss of Chris McAlister to both graduation and the NFL that led Arizona's defense in 1998 and without him, the Wildcats' defense heavily struggled.
- The loss to Penn State ended hopes of Arizona rebuilding a dynasty under Tomey and would lead to the downfall of the program at the turn of the century. The Wildcats would not schedule another game with Penn State in the future (which would have possibly been played in Tucson in 2000) due to fears that they would not win against the Nittany Lions and that it would be too expensive to do so.
- After the Penn State game, College GameDay would not involve going to a campus for a game featuring Arizona until November 2009 when it came to Tucson for the Wildcats' matchup with Oregon.
- Arizona Stadium unveiled a new scoreboard behind the north end zone. It featured a large video screen and a new sound system. The lights in the score box where the total number of points scored were originally lit in gold before switching to red before the game against Washington. This scoreboard would last until it was torn down after the 2011 season.
- In addition to getting a new scoreboard, Arizona Stadium's field was the same except a 100th anniversary logo was placed over the two "Block 'A'"s on each 25-yard line, as Arizona celebrated the 100th anniversary of its football program during the season. A special 100th anniversary logo was patched on the team's home and road uniforms as well.
- Arizona began the season with three consecutive games against teams that they have never played before and played them for the first time (Penn State, TCU, Middle Tennessee State). The games against Penn State and Middle Tennessee remain the Wildcats' only meetings against them, whereas they would play TCU again in 2003 (in which they would ultimately lose).
- It was the second consecutive season that Arizona played the first two games on the road.
- After beating Washington State, they would not win another game with a Hail Mary touchdown pass until 2014, when they defeated California with the play.
- The win over USC was the Wildcats' first and only home win over a Pac-10 opponent during the season.
- After the loss to Oregon, a McDonald's location near the Arizona campus featured signs of a kicker missing a field goal and a referee signaling the kick as "no good", which was a pun on the original Wildcat kicker, Mark McDonald, who shared the same name of the fast-food chain, as a joke. The signs were taken down after the season ended.
- The loss to Washington caused many fans to give up on the season and focused on the Wildcats' basketball season as that team was successful in winning unlike the football team who could not meet expectations.
- The rivalry loss at Arizona State not only ended the season, it ended the Wildcat careers of Smith, Canidate, and Northcutt, all of whom led to Arizona's offense to dominate in 1998. Had they won more games and went to a major bowl, Canidate would have joined Northcutt as a consensus All-American. Canidate was a possible Heisman contender before the Wildcats' loss to Penn State in the opener ended those chances.
- Northcutt was known to fans as "Dennis the Menace" (named after the fictional character that shares Northcutt's first name), as he blew away opposing defenses with his long catch-and-runs and touchdowns during his Arizona career. He currently holds the Arizona record for single-season receiving yards, which was this season, with 1,422. He is ranked third in career receptions (223), second in single-season receptions (88 this year), and second in career receiving yards (3,252), surpassed by teammate Bobby Wade in all three categories. Northcutt is ahead of Wade in career touchdowns with 24 (to Wade's 23) and third in single-game receiving yards (257 in the win over TCU this year). For his performance this season, Northcutt was honored as a consensus All-American.
- Canidate rushed for 1,602 yards this season, which is ranked in Arizona history, and was the record holder until Ka'Deem Carey broke it in 2012. He is also second to Carey in career rushing yards with 3,824.
- The Wildcats' loss to Arizona State started a current run of futility for the, in the rivalry, as Arizona would only win seven of 21 meetings against ASU since 2000. Before this year, the Wildcats dominated the Sun Devils, going 13–3–1 against them between 1982 and 1998.
- This season would be the last official year of the "Desert Swarm" era, as the defense would become inconsistent in 2000 onwards. The offense, known as the "Desert Storm" (the opposite of the Swarm) would continue until the end of the 2002 season, which was Wade's final season.

== After the season ==
The 1999 season would become a step towards the end of Tomey's tenure, as another mediocre season in 2000 in which Arizona would collapse in the second half, would lead to his resignation as coach and the program struggling for most of the next decade. Many Wildcats have often blamed the opening season loss to Penn State as the cause of the team's fall from success and the program not being the same for several years due to the Wildcats' inability to get to the Rose Bowl under Tomey and his future successors.
