= 1999 Hawaii Rainbow Warriors football team =

American college football season

1999 Hawaii Rainbow Warriors football

WAC co-champion Oahu Bowl champion

Oahu Bowl, W 23–17 vs. Oregon State
- Conference: Western Athletic Conference
- Record: 9–4 (5–2 WAC)
- Head coach: June Jones (1st season)
- Offensive scheme: Run and shoot
- Defensive coordinator: Greg McMackin (1st season)
- Base defense: 4–3
- Home stadium: Aloha Stadium

1999 Western Athletic Conference football standings
	Conf.			Overall
Team	W		L	W		L
Hawaii +	5	–	2	9	–	4
TCU +	5	–	2	8	–	4
Fresno State +	5	–	2	8	–	5
Rice	4	–	3	5	–	6
SMU	3	–	3	4	–	6
UTEP	3	–	4	5	–	7
San Jose State	1	–	5	3	–	7
Tulsa	1	–	6	2	–	9
+ – Conference co-champions

The 1999 Hawaii Rainbow Warriors football team represented the University of Hawaii at Manoa in the 1999 NCAA Division I-A football season. Hawaii finished the 1999 season with a 9–4 record, going 5–2 in Western Athletic Conference (WAC) play. The Warriors capped the best single season turnaround in NCAA history with a win in the Oahu Bowl after going winless the year before. New head coach June Jones led the Warriors to their first conference championship and bowl victory and appearance since the 1992 season.

== Schedule ==
Date	Time	Opponent	Site	TV	Result	Attendance	Source
September 4	6:30 pm	No. 21 USC*	Aloha Stadium; Halawa, HI	KFVE	L 7–62	50,000	
September 11	6:00 pm	Eastern Illinois*	Aloha Stadium; Halawa, HI		W 31–27	28,762	
September 18	6:00 pm	Boise State*	Aloha Stadium; Halawa, HI		W 34–19	31,751	
September 25	9:00 am	at SMU	Cotton Bowl; Dallas, TX	KFVE	W 20–0	15,131	
October 2	6:00 pm	UTEP^{†}	Aloha Stadium; Halawa, HI		W 33–3	39,021	
October 9	6:00 pm	Rice	Aloha Stadium; Halawa, HI		L 19–38	37,975	
October 23	10:00 am	at Tulsa	Skelly Stadium; Tulsa, OK	SPW	W 35–21	15,756	
October 30	6:00 pm	TCU	Aloha Stadium; Halawa, HI		L 14–34	33,357	
November 6	10:30 am	at San Jose State	Spartan Stadium; San Jose, CA (rivalry)	KFVE	W 62–41	15,367	
November 13	6:00 pm	Fresno State	Aloha Stadium; Halawa, HI (rivalry)		W 31–24 ^{2OT}	37,283	
November 20	6:00 pm	Navy*	Aloha Stadium; Halawa, HI		W 48–41	41,895	
November 27	6:00 pm	Washington State*	Aloha Stadium; Halawa, HI		L 14–22	45,382	
December 25	3:30 pm	vs. Oregon State*	Aloha Stadium; Halawa, HI (Oahu Bowl)	ESPN	W 23–17	40,974	
*Non-conference game; ^{†}Homecoming; Rankings from AP Poll released prior to the game; All times are in Hawaii–Aleutian time

== Game summaries ==
=== No. 21 USC ===
	1	2	3	4	Total
No. 21 Trojans	17	24	14	7	62
Rainbow Warriors	0	0	7	0	7

=== Eastern Illinois ===
	1	2	3	4	Total
Panthers	10	7	7	3	27
Rainbow Warriors	0	10	21	0	31

=== Boise State ===
	1	2	3	4	Total
Broncos	7	12	0	0	19
Rainbow Warriors	7	0	7	20	34

=== At SMU ===
	1	2	3	4	Total
Rainbow Warriors	7	3	0	10	20
Mustangs	0	0	0	0	0

=== UTEP ===
	1	2	3	4	Total
Miners	3	0	0	0	3
Rainbow Warriors	7	6	7	13	33

=== Rice ===
	1	2	3	4	Total
Owls	7	3	14	14	38
Rainbow Warriors	10	0	3	6	19

=== At Tulsa ===
	1	2	3	4	Total
Rainbow Warriors	7	14	7	7	35
Golden Hurricane	7	0	7	7	21

=== TCU ===
	1	2	3	4	Total
Horned Frogs	14	0	7	13	34
Rainbow Warriors	6	0	0	8	14

=== At San Jose State ===
	1	2	3	4	Total
Rainbow Warriors	9	20	6	27	62
Spartans	0	7	0	34	41

=== Fresno State ===
	1	2	3	4	OT	2OT	Total
Bulldogs	7	0	0	14	3	0	24
Rainbow Warriors	7	6	0	8	3	7	31

=== Navy ===
	1	2	3	4	Total
Midshipmen	0	24	3	14	41
Rainbow Warriors	3	24	14	7	48

=== Washington State ===
	1	2	3	4	Total
Cougars	3	0	9	10	22
Rainbow Warriors	0	0	14	0	14

=== Vs. Oregon State (Oahu Bowl) ===
	1	2	3	4	Total
Rainbow Warriors	0	10	10	3	23
Beavers	7	3	0	7	17

== Postseason and awards ==
Hawaii was never ranked in the AP poll or the Coaches' Poll throughout the season. Hawaii did receive enough votes to put them at 30 in the final AP poll and 32 and in the Coaches' Poll.

Head coach June Jones, was named National Coach of the Year by CNN/Sports Illustrated, American Football Coach/Shutt Sports and Sporting News and WAC Coach of the Year.

The following players were named to the All-WAC team:

=== First team ===
- Dwight Carter, wide receiver
- Adrian Klemm, offensive line
- Kaulana Noa, offensive line
- Jeff Ulbrich, linebacker
- Quincy LeJay, defensive back
- Jamal Garland, special teams

=== Second team ===
- Dan Robinson, quarterback
- Matt Paul, defensive line
- Chad Shrout, punter

== Statistical achievements and leaders ==
The 1999 Hawaii Rainbow Warriors team broke the nation's longest active losing streak at 19 losses when they defeated Eastern Illinois. They also broke a 24 game WAC losing streak going back seven years. The offense led the WAC in total offense (417.7 yards) and passing offense (328.7 yards), which ranked #3 in of all NCAA. This was also the first time Hawaii received votes in national polls since 1992.

Quarterback Dan Robinson threw for an all-time school record 530 yards against Navy and became the school's all-time passing leader with 6,038 yards. Linebacker Jeff Ulbrich broke the school record for most assisted tackles in a game with 18 against Navy and the single-season record for most total tackles with 169. Wide receiver Dwight Carter broke the school record for most receiving yards in a game with 220 yards on 9 receptions against Eastern Illinois. Carter also became only the second player in UH football history to catch for more than 1,000 yards in a single season.

=== Passing ===
Player	Attempts	Completions	Interceptions	Comp %	Yards	TD
Dan Robinson	556	228	18	51.8	3853	28

No other player had more than 100 passing yards.

=== Rushing ===
Player	Attempts	Net yards	Yards per attempt	Touchdowns
Avion Weaver	114	645	5.7	4
Afatia Thompson	90	435	4.8	3

=== Receiving ===
Player	Receptions	Yards	Yds/Recp	TD
Dwight Carter	77	1253	16.3	9
Craig Stutzmann	63	658	10.4	8
Channon Harris	56	860	15.4	6
Ashley Leslie	36	518	14.4	2
Afatia Thompson	26	212	8.2	0
Avion Weaver	19	151	7.9	0
Attrice Brooks	7	187	26.7	3

=== Punt Returns ===
Player	No.	Yards	Avg	TD	Long
Jamal Garland	38	282	7.4	0	46

=== Kick Returns ===
Player	No.	Yards	Avg	TD	Long
Jamal Garland	33	751	22.8	0	41

=== Interceptions ===
Player	No.	Yards	Avg	TD	Long
Quincy LeJay	7	151	21.6	3	54
Dedrick Miller	3	47	15.7	0	30
Jeff Ulbrich	2	19.0	0	38	
Shawndel Tucker	2	10	5.0	0	6
Joe Correia	1	4	4.0	0	4
Anthony Smith	1	22	22.0	0	22
Phil Austin	1	0	0.0	0	0

Statistics accurate as of Nov. 28, 1999.

== 2000 NFL draft ==
The following players were claimed in the 2000 NFL draft.

Player	Position	Round	Pick	NFL club
Adrian Klemm	Offensive tackle	2	46	New England Patriots
Jeff Ulbrich	Linebacker	3	86	San Francisco 49ers
Kaulana Noa	Offensive guard	4	104	St. Louis Rams

Another five players signed free agent contracts with NFL teams. Center Dustin Owen and wide receiver Dwight Carter (San Francisco 49ers), quarterback Dan Robinson (Baltimore Ravens), offensive guard Andy Phillips (San Diego Chargers), and defensive back Yaphet Warren (Seattle Seahawks).
