= 1999 USC Trojans football team =

American college football season

1999 USC Trojans football
- Conference: Pacific-10 Conference
- Record: 6–6 (3–5 Pac-10)
- Head coach: Paul Hackett (2nd season)
- Offensive coordinator: Hue Jackson (3rd season)
- Offensive scheme: Pro-style
- Defensive coordinator: Bill Young (2nd season)
- Base defense: 4–3
- Captains: David Gibson; Chad Morton; Ifeanyi Ohalete
- Home stadium: Los Angeles Memorial Coliseum

1999 Pacific-10 Conference football standings
| | Conf. | | | Overall |
| Team | W | | L | W | | L |
|---|---|---|---|---|---|---|
| Stanford $ | 7 | – | 1 | 8 | – | 4 |
| No. 19 Oregon | 6 | – | 2 | 9 | – | 3 |
| Washington | 6 | – | 2 | 7 | – | 5 |
| Arizona State | 5 | – | 3 | 6 | – | 6 |
| Oregon State | 4 | – | 4 | 7 | – | 5 |
| Arizona | 3 | – | 5 | 6 | – | 6 |
| USC | 3 | – | 5 | 6 | – | 6 |
| California | 3 | – | 5 | 4 | – | 7 |
| UCLA | 2 | – | 6 | 4 | – | 7 |
| Washington State | 1 | – | 7 | 3 | – | 9 |
$ – BCS representative as conference champion; Cal later vacated 4 wins (3 in conference) due to NCAA sanctions.; Rankings from AP Poll

The 1999 USC Trojans football team represented the University of Southern California (USC) as a member of Pacific-10 Conference (Pac-10) during the 1999 NCAA Division I-A football season. In their second year under head coach Paul Hackett, the Trojans compiled an overall record of 6–6 record with a mark of 3–5 in conference play, tying for sixth place in the Pac-10, and outscored opponents 348 to 278. The team played home games at Los Angeles Memorial Coliseum in Los Angeles.

Quarterback Mike Van Raaphorst led the team in passing, completing 139 of 258 passes for 1,758 yards with eight touchdowns and nine interceptions. Chad Morton led the team in rushing with 262 carries for 1,141 yards and 15 touchdowns. Kareem Kelly led the team in receiving yards with 54 catches for 902 yards and four touchdowns.

== Schedule ==
| Date | Time | Opponent | Rank | Site | TV | Result | Attendance | Source |
|---|---|---|---|---|---|---|---|---|
| September 4 | 9:30 p.m. | at Hawaii* | No. 21 | Aloha Stadium; Halawa, HI | FSNW2 | W 62–7 | 50,000 | |
| September 18 | 12:30 p.m. | San Diego State* | No. 17 | Los Angeles Memorial Coliseum; Los Angeles, CA | ABC | W 24–21 | 53,966 | |
| September 25 | 7:15 p.m. | at Oregon | No. 16 | Autzen Stadium; Eugene, OR | FSN | L 30-33 ^{3OT} | 45,660 | |
| October 2 | 3:30 p.m. | Oregon State | | Los Angeles Memorial Coliseum; Los Angeles, CA | FSNW2 | W 37–29 | 43,795 | |
| October 9 | 12:30 p.m. | at Arizona | No. 22 | Arizona Stadium; Tucson, AZ | ABC | L 24–31 | 51,418 | |
| October 16 | 11:30 a.m. | at Notre Dame* | | Notre Dame Stadium; Notre Dame, IN (rivalry) | NBC | L 24–25 | 80,012 | |
| October 23 | 12:30 p.m. | Stanford | | Los Angeles Memorial Coliseum; Los Angeles, CA (rivalry) | ABC | L 31–35 | 57,494 | |
| October 30 | 3:30 p.m. | at California | | California Memorial Stadium; Berkeley, CA | FSN | L 7–17 | 54,000 | |
| November 6 | 3:30 p.m. | Arizona State^{†} | | Los Angeles Memorial Coliseum; Los Angeles, CA | FSN | L 16–26 | 53,382 | |
| November 13 | 12:30 p.m. | at Washington State | | Martin Stadium; Pullman, WA | ABC | W 31–28 | 23,065 | |
| November 20 | 12:30 p.m. | UCLA | | Los Angeles Memorial Coliseum; Los Angeles, CA (Victory Bell) | ABC | W 17–7 | 91,384 | |
| November 26 | 3:30 p.m. | No. 25 Louisiana Tech* | | Los Angeles Memorial Coliseum; Los Angeles, CA | FSN | W 45–19 | 45,070 | |
*Non-conference game; ^{†}Homecoming; Rankings from AP Poll released prior to the game; All times are in Pacific time

== Rankings ==
Ranking movements Legend: ██ Increase in ranking ██ Decrease in ranking — = Not ranked RV = Received votes
| | Week | | | | | | | | | | | | | | | | |
| Poll | Pre | 1 | 2 | 3 | 4 | 5 | 6 | 7 | 8 | 9 | 10 | 11 | 12 | 13 | 14 | 15 | Final |
|---|---|---|---|---|---|---|---|---|---|---|---|---|---|---|---|---|---|
| AP | 19 | 21 | 18 | 17 | 16 | RV | 22 | — | — | — | — | — | — | — | — | — | — |
| Coaches Poll | 21 | 21* | 20 | 19 | 16 | 23 | 22 | — | — | — | — | — | — | — | — | — | — |
| BCS | Not released | | | | | | | | | — | — | — | — | — | — | — | Not released |

== Game summaries ==
=== at Hawaii ===
| | 1 | 2 | 3 | 4 | Total |
|---|---|---|---|---|---|
| No. 21 Trojans | 17 | 24 | 14 | 7 | 62 |
| Rainbow Warriors | 0 | 0 | 7 | 0 | 7 |

=== vs San Diego State ===
| | 1 | 2 | 3 | 4 | Total |
|---|---|---|---|---|---|
| Aztecs | 0 | 7 | 7 | 7 | 21 |
| No. 17 Trojans | 7 | 10 | 0 | 7 | 24 |

=== at Oregon ===
| | 1 | 2 | 3 | 4 | OT | 2OT | 3OT | Total |
|---|---|---|---|---|---|---|---|---|
| No. 16 Trojans | 7 | 3 | 0 | 13 | 0 | 7 | 0 | 30 |
| Ducks | 10 | 0 | 10 | 3 | 0 | 7 | 3 | 33 |

=== vs Oregon State ===
| | 1 | 2 | 3 | 4 | Total |
|---|---|---|---|---|---|
| Beavers | 7 | 0 | 0 | 22 | 29 |
| Trojans | 10 | 13 | 14 | 0 | 37 |

=== at Arizona ===
| | 1 | 2 | 3 | 4 | Total |
|---|---|---|---|---|---|
| No. 22 Trojans | 0 | 10 | 7 | 7 | 24 |
| Wildcats | 7 | 3 | 7 | 14 | 31 |

=== at Notre Dame ===
| | 1 | 2 | 3 | 4 | Total |
|---|---|---|---|---|---|
| Trojans | 7 | 14 | 3 | 0 | 24 |
| Fighting Irish | 0 | 3 | 7 | 15 | 25 |

=== vs Stanford ===
| | 1 | 2 | 3 | 4 | Total |
|---|---|---|---|---|---|
| Cardinal | 0 | 14 | 14 | 7 | 35 |
| Trojans | 21 | 3 | 7 | 0 | 31 |

=== at California ===
| | 1 | 2 | 3 | 4 | Total |
|---|---|---|---|---|---|
| Trojans | 0 | 0 | 7 | 0 | 7 |
| Golden Bears | 0 | 7 | 3 | 7 | 17 |

=== vs Arizona State ===
| | 1 | 2 | 3 | 4 | Total |
|---|---|---|---|---|---|
| Sun Devils | 7 | 12 | 0 | 7 | 26 |
| Trojans | 7 | 3 | 0 | 6 | 16 |

=== at Washington State ===
| | 1 | 2 | 3 | 4 | Total |
|---|---|---|---|---|---|
| Trojans | 14 | 3 | 14 | 0 | 31 |
| Cougars | 7 | 7 | 7 | 7 | 28 |

=== vs UCLA ===
| | 1 | 2 | 3 | 4 | Total |
|---|---|---|---|---|---|
| Bruins | 0 | 7 | 0 | 0 | 7 |
| Trojans | 3 | 7 | 0 | 7 | 17 |

=== vs No. 25 Louisiana Tech ===
| | 1 | 2 | 3 | 4 | Total |
|---|---|---|---|---|---|
| No. 25 Bulldogs | 7 | 6 | 0 | 6 | 19 |
| Trojans | 21 | 7 | 7 | 10 | 45 |

== Personnel ==
=== Coaching staff ===
1999 USC Trojans coaching staff
| Name | Position | Year at USC | Alma mater (year) |
|---|---|---|---|
| Paul Hackett | Head coach | 2nd | UC Davis (1969) |
| Steve Greatwood | Offensive line | 2nd | Oregon (1981) |
| Hue Jackson | Offensive coordinator/running backs | 3rd | Pacific (1987) |
| Steve Morton | Tight ends | 1st | Washington State (1976) |
| Ken O'Brien | Quarterbacks | 2nd | UC Davis (1983) |
| Ed Orgeron | Defensive line | 2nd | Northwestern State (1984) |
| Shawn Slocum | Linebackers/special teams coordinator | 2nd | Texas A&M (1987) |
| Dennis Thurman | Secondary | 7th | USC (1978) |
| Mike Wilson | Wide receivers | 3rd | Washington State (1981) |
| Bill Young | Defensive coordinator | 2nd | Oklahoma State (1967) |

=== Roster ===
1999 USC Trojans football team roster
Players
Coaches
Offense

| Pos. | # | Name | Class |
|---|---|---|---|
| G | 71 | Travis Claridge | Sr |
| WR | 86 | Windrell Hayes | Sr |
| TB | 7 | Chad Morton | Sr |
| QB | 3 | Carson Palmer | So |
| RB | 35 | Petros Papadakis | Sr |
| FB | 34 | Chad Pierson | Fr |
| WR | 18 | R. Jay Soward | Sr |
| OT | 74 | Nate Steinbacher | Fr |
| WR | 83 | Steve Stevenson | Fr |
| RB | 1 | Frank Strong | So |
| QB | 11 | Mike Van Raaphorst | Jr |

Defense

| Pos. | # | Name | Class |
|---|---|---|---|
| DB | 22 | David Gibson | Sr |
| LB | 9 | Zeke Moreno | Jr |
| S | 31 | Ifeanyi Ohalete | Jr |
| S | 43 | Troy Polamalu | Fr |
| CB | 2 | Darrell Rideaux | Fr |
| DT | 93 | Bernard Riley | Fr |
| LB | 55 | Markus Steele | Jr |

Special teams

| Pos. | # | Name | Class |

Head coach

- Paul Hackett

Coordinators/assistant coaches

Legend

- (C) Team captain
- (S) Suspended
- (I) Ineligible
- Injured
- Redshirt

Roster
Last update: 1999-09-02

== Awards ==
- All-Pac-10: OL Travis Claridge, DB David Gibson
