= Al Gross (American football) =

American football player (born 1961)

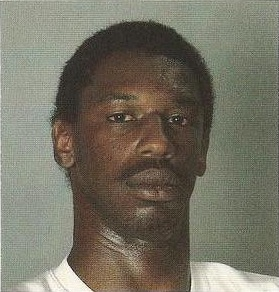

No. 31, 27
- Position: Safety

Personal information
- Born: January 4, 1961 (age 65); Stockton, California, U.S.
- Listed height: 6 ft 3 in (1.91 m)
- Listed weight: 191 lb (87 kg)

Career information
- High school: Franklin (Garden Acres, California)
- College: Arizona
- NFL draft: 1983: 9th round, 246th overall pick

Career history
- Dallas Cowboys (1983)*; Cleveland Browns (1983–1987)
- * Offseason or practice squad member only

Awards and highlights
- First-team All-Pac-10 (1982)

Career NFL statistics
- Interceptions: 11
- Touchdowns: 2
- Fumble recoveries: 6
- Stats at Pro Football Reference

Alfred Ellis Gross Jr. (born January 4, 1961) is an American former professional football player who was a safety in the National Football League (NFL) for the Cleveland Browns. He played college football for the Arizona Wildcats.

== Early life ==
Gross attended Franklin High School, where he was a two-time All-conference selection in both football and basketball. He earned All-state honors in basketball as a senior.

He accepted a football scholarship from the University of Arizona. He became a starter at strong safety as a sophomore and went on to play in 33 straight games. He was known as a hard-hitting player that excelled in big games. He had 4 career interceptions.

== Professional career ==
=== Dallas Cowboys ===
Gross was selected in the ninth round (246th overall) of the 1983 NFL draft by the Dallas Cowboys. He was also selected by the Arizona Wranglers in the 1983 USFL Territorial Draft. At his request, he was released very early in training camp on August 1.

=== Cleveland Browns ===
On August 3, 1983, he was claimed off waivers by the Cleveland Browns. His early contributions came playing on special teams and backing up both safety positions.

In 1984, he was named the starter at strong safety and was part of a secondary that earned the nickname "Dawgs", while helping the defensive unit to finish second overall in the NFL. He led the team two years in a row (1984 and 1985) with 5 interceptions.

On September 9, 1986, he was placed on the injured reserve list with a knee injury.

In 1987, he started the first four games of the season at free safety, before experiencing complications from a knee injury he suffered the year before. He lost his starting position to Felix Wright and was placed on the inactive list during the last 4 games of the regular season and the playoffs.

On August 4, 1988, he requested to be released from the Browns roster, after feeling he wasn't getting much work in training camp. He finished his career with 261 tackles, 11 interceptions, 6 fumble recoveries and 2 touchdowns.
