= Chris Cash (American football) =

American football player and coach (born 1980)

Albany State Golden Rams
- Title: Defensive coordinator & safeties coach

Personal information
- Born: July 13, 1980 (age 46); Stockton, California, U.S.
- Listed height: 5 ft 10 in (1.78 m)
- Listed weight: 185 lb (84 kg)

Career information
- High school: Stockton (CA) Franklin
- College: USC
- NFL draft: 2002: 6th round, 175th overall pick

Career history

Playing
- Detroit Lions (2002–2004); Atlanta Falcons (2005–2006)

Coaching
- Franklin HS (CA) (2011–2012) Defensive coordinator; Florida A&M (2013–2014) Safeties coach; Seattle Seahawks (2015–2016) Assistant secondary coach; Alcorn State (2018–2021) Safeties coach; Albany State (2022–present) Defensive coordinator & safeties coach

Awards and highlights
- Second-team All-Pac-10 (2001)

Career NFL statistics
- Total tackles: 144
- Forced fumbles: 2
- Fumble recoveries: 2
- Pass deflections: 16
- Interceptions: 2
- Stats at Pro Football Reference

Christopher James Cash (born July 13, 1980) is an American football coach and former cornerback. He is the defensive coordinator and safeties coach for Albany State University, positions he has held since 2022. Cash played professionally for the Detroit Lions and Atlanta Falcons.

== Early life ==
He attended Franklin High School in Stockton.

== College career ==
Cash played college football at the University of Southern California and graduated in 2002. He was All-Pac-10 second-team as a senior for the USC Trojans. He transferred to USC from Palomar College in San Marcos, California. Cash accepted a scholarship to University of Colorado out of high school, but a mix-up with his transcript prevented him from enrolling.

== Professional career ==
=== Detroit Lions ===
Cash was selected by the Detroit Lions in the sixth round (175th overall) of the 2002 NFL draft. He started in 12 games and had 100 tackles and one interception his rookie season with the Lions, but he missed the 2003 campaign with a knee injury. In 2004, Cash played in 11 games for the Lions, starting five. He was waived on September 3, 2005.

=== Atlanta Falcons ===
Cash signed with the Atlanta Falcons on September 19, 2005, but only played in three games. Cash spent the 2006 season (after September 2) on injured reserve. Unable to stay healthy, he was released thereafter by the Falcons and did not play another NFL game.

== Coaching career ==
He served as defensive coordinator for Franklin High School's football team for five years. In March 2013, Cash was hired as safeties coach at Florida A&M University.

On March 25, 2015, Cash was named as an assistant secondary coach for Seattle Seahawks.
