= Franklin High School (Stockton, California) =

Public high school in California, United States

Coordinates: 37°58′06″N 121°14′15″W

- 300 N. Gertrude; Garden Acres, CA, USA 95215

Information
- Type: Public high school
- Motto: Home of the Yellow Jackets
- Established: 1950
- School district: Stockton Unified School District
- Principal: Gamal Salama
- Staff: 99.49 (FTE)
- Grades: 6 – 12
- Enrollment: 2,188 (2023-2024)
- Student to teacher ratio: 21.99
- Colors: Green and Gold
- Mascot: Yellow Jacket
- Rival: Edison High School
- Website: franklin.stocktonusd.net

Franklin High School is a public high school located in Garden Acres, California, United States. The school's colors are green and gold. Their school mascot is the yellow jacket. They are one of the many schools that have the I.B. program through the International Baccalaureate Academy. The school also has the federal program Junior Reserve Officers' Training Corps (JROTC). The principal is Anna Lotti

== Notable alumni ==
- Chris Cash, former NFL player
- Al Gross, former NFL player
- Eddie Guardado, former professional baseball player (Minnesota Twins, Seattle Mariners, Cincinnati Reds, Texas Rangers)
- Windrell Hayes, former NFL player
- José M. Hernández, astronaut
- George Knapp, journalist
- Dave Oliver, former professional baseball player (Cleveland Indians)
- Hallway Productionz, three-time grammy nominated music producers.
- Lefty Phillips, Second manager of MLB California Angels. (Now known as the LA Angels of Anaheim)
- Webster Slaughter, former NFL All-Pro
- Michael Tubbs, elected in 2016 as the youngest mayor in Stockton's history, and its first African-American mayor.
- Jim White, the most successful high school cross country coach. Portrayed by Kevin Costner in the 2015 movie McFarland USA
