= 1999 Oregon State Beavers football team =

American college football season

1999 Oregon State Beavers football

Oahu Bowl, L 17–23 vs. Hawaii
- Conference: Pacific-10 Conference
- Record: 7–5 (4–4 Pac-10)
- Head coach: Dennis Erickson (1st season)
- Offensive coordinator: Tim Lappano (1st season)
- Offensive scheme: Single-back spread
- Defensive coordinator: Willy Robinson (1st season)
- Base defense: 4–3
- Home stadium: Parker Stadium

1999 Pacific-10 Conference football standings
| | Conf. | | | Overall |
| Team | W | | L | W | | L |
|---|---|---|---|---|---|---|
| Stanford $ | 7 | – | 1 | 8 | – | 4 |
| No. 19 Oregon | 6 | – | 2 | 9 | – | 3 |
| Washington | 6 | – | 2 | 7 | – | 5 |
| Arizona State | 5 | – | 3 | 6 | – | 6 |
| Oregon State | 4 | – | 4 | 7 | – | 5 |
| Arizona | 3 | – | 5 | 6 | – | 6 |
| USC | 3 | – | 5 | 6 | – | 6 |
| California | 3 | – | 5 | 4 | – | 7 |
| UCLA | 2 | – | 6 | 4 | – | 7 |
| Washington State | 1 | – | 7 | 3 | – | 9 |
$ – BCS representative as conference champion; Cal later vacated 4 wins (3 in conference) due to NCAA sanctions.; Rankings from AP Poll

The 1999 Oregon State Beavers football team represented Oregon State University as a member of the Pacific-10 Conference (Pac-10) during the 1999 NCAA Division I-A football season. In their first season under head coach Dennis Erickson, the Beavers compiled an overall record of 7–5 with a mark of 4–4 in conference play, placing fifth in the Pac-10. It was the program's first winning season since 1970. The Beavers opened with three non-conference wins, lost the first three conference games, then won four straight, but fell in the Civil War at Oregon. Oregon State made its first bowl game appearance since the 1964 season, but dropped the Oahu Bowl by six points to Hawaii on Christmas. The team played home games at Parker Stadium, previously known as Parker Stadium, in Corvallis, Oregon.

Hired in January, Erickson was previously the head coach of the Seattle Seahawks of the National Football League (NFL) for four years, preceded by six seasons as the head football coach at the University of Miami. Predecessor Mike Riley had left the Beavers after just two seasons for the NFL's San Diego Chargers, but then returned to Corvallis in February 2003.

== Schedule ==
| Date | Time | Opponent | Site | TV | Result | Attendance | Source |
|---|---|---|---|---|---|---|---|
| September 4 | 1:00 pm | at Nevada* | Mackay Stadium; Reno, NV | | W 28–13 | 29,167 | |
| September 11 | 3:30 pm | Fresno State* | Reser Stadium; Corvallis, OR | | W 46–23 | 30,339 | |
| September 18 | 3:30 pm | No. 1 (I-AA) Georgia Southern* | Reser Stadium; Corvallis, OR | | W 48–41 | 27,031 | |
| October 2 | 3:30 pm | at No. 16 USC | Los Angeles Memorial Coliseum; Los Angeles, CA | | L 29–37 | 43,795 | |
| October 9 | 3:30 pm | Washington | Reser Stadium; Corvallis, OR | FSN | L 21–47 | 35,470 | |
| October 16 | 2:00 pm | at Stanford | Stanford Stadium; Stanford, CA | | L 17–21 | 37,419 | |
| October 23 | 3:30 pm | UCLA^{†} | Reser Stadium; Corvallis, OR | FSN | W 55–7 | 33,427 | |
| October 30 | 1:00 pm | at Washington State | Martin Stadium; Pullman, WA | | W 27–13 | 34,240 | |
| November 6 | 3:30 pm | California | Reser Stadium; Corvallis, OR | FSN | W 17–7 | 35,520 | |
| November 13 | 7:15 pm | Arizona | Reser Stadium; Corvallis, OR | FSN | W 28–20 | 33,314 | |
| November 20 | 3:30 pm | at Oregon | Autzen Stadium; Eugene, OR (Civil War) | FSN | L 14–25 | 46,115 | |
| December 25 | 5:30 pm | vs. Hawaii* | Aloha Stadium; Halawa, HI (Oahu Bowl) | ESPN | L 17–23 | 40,974 | |
*Non-conference game; ^{†}Homecoming; Rankings from AP Poll released prior to the game; All times are in Pacific time

== Game summaries ==
=== UCLA ===
| Team | 1 | 2 | 3 | 4 | Total |
|---|---|---|---|---|---|
| UCLA | 0 | 7 | 0 | 0 | 7 |
| • Oregon St | 14 | 28 | 0 | 13 | 55 |

- Date: October 23
- Location: Reser Stadium, Corvallis, Oregon
- Game attendance: 33,427

Scoring summary
| 1 | 9:57 | ORST | Ken Simonton 4 yard run (Ryan Cesca kick) | Oregon St 7–0 |
| 1 | 1:53 | ORST | Roddy Tompkins 23 yard pass from Jonathan Smith (Ryan Cesca kick) | Oregon St 14–0 |
| 2 | 9:52 | ORST | Jonathan Smith 10 yard run (Ryan Cesca kick) | Oregon St 21–0 |
| 2 | 5:54 | UCLA | Gabe Crecion 4 yard pass from Cory Paus (Chris Griffith kick) | Oregon St 21–7 |
| 2 | 5:31 | ORST | Antonio Battle 50 yard run (Ryan Cesca kick) | Oregon St 28–7 |
| 2 | 3:31 | ORST | Roddy Tompkins 47 yard pass from Jonathan Smith (Ryan Cesca kick) | Oregon St 35–7 |
| 2 | :35 | ORST | Imani Percoats 10 yard pass from Jonathan Smith (Ryan Cesca kick) | Oregon St 42–7 |
| 4 | 4:44 | ORST | Shawn Kintner 38 yard pass from Terrance Bryant (Matt Stanwood kick) | Oregon St 49–7 |
| 4 | 2:43 | ORST | Hashim Hall 3 yard run (kick failed) | Oregon St 55–7 |

Oregon State's biggest margin of victory in three years (67–28 over Northern Illinois), and their highest point total to date against a Pac-10 opponent.

== Roster ==
1999 Oregon State Beavers football team roster
Players
Coaches
Offense

| Pos. | # | Name | Class |
|---|---|---|---|
| WR | 81 | T. J. Houshmandzadeh | Jr |
| C | 50 | Aaron Koch | Sr |
| HB | 35 | Ken Simonton | So |
| QB | 9 | Jonathan Smith | So |

Defense

| Pos. | # | Name | Class |
|---|---|---|---|
| LB | 34 | James Allen | So |
| DT | 55 | Shawn Ball | Sr |
| LB | 42 | Nick Barnett | Fr |

Special teams

| Pos. | # | Name | Class |
|---|---|---|---|
| PK | 41 | Ryan Cesca | Fr |
| P | 25 | Mike Fessler | Jr |
| PK | 46 | Matt Stanwood | Jr |

Head coach

- Dennis Erickson (1st year)

Coordinators/assistant coaches

- Tim Lappano (OC)
- Willy Robinson (DC)

Legend

- (C) Team captain
- (S) Suspended
- (I) Ineligible
- Injured
- Redshirt

Roster
