= Fresno State–Hawaii football rivalry =

American college football rivalry

- Fresno State Bulldogs Hawaii Rainbow Warriors
- First meeting: November 18, 1938; Fresno State, 15–13
- Latest meeting: September 20, 2025; Fresno State, 23–21

Statistics
- Total meetings: 57
- All-time series: Fresno State leads, 31–25–1
- Largest victory: Fresno State, 70–14 (2004)
- Longest win streak: Fresno State, 8 (1955–1966)
- Current win streak: Fresno State, 1 (2025–present)

Locations of Fresno State and Hawaii

The Fresno State–Hawaii football rivalry is an American college football rivalry between the Fresno State Bulldogs and the Hawaii Rainbow Warriors. Also nicknamed the Battle for the Golden Screwdriver, it is Hawaii's most-played rivalry series. The two teams have met 56 times, with Fresno State leading the all-time series 31–25–1 through the 2025 season.

== Game results ==
Fresno State victories	Hawaii victories	Tie games

No.	Date	Location	Winner	Score
1	November 18, 1938	Fresno, CA	Fresno State	15–13
2	December 2, 1939	Honolulu, HI	Fresno State	38–2
3	January 1, 1941	Honolulu, HI	Fresno State	3–0
4	November 11, 1946	Fresno, CA	Hawaii	7–2
5	December 6, 1947	Honolulu, HI	Hawaii	27–13
6	December 2, 1949	Honolulu, HI	Hawaii	41–14
7	October 6, 1950	Fresno, CA	Fresno State	34–20
8	September 25, 1954	Fresno, CA	Hawaii	25–20
9	November 26, 1955	Honolulu, HI	Fresno State	20–18
10	October 27, 1956	Fresno, CA	Fresno State	39–20
11	November 22, 1957	Honolulu, HI	Fresno State	31–8
12	November 27, 1959	Honolulu, HI	Fresno State	22–13
13	September 24, 1960	Fresno, CA	Fresno State	17–7
14	October 3, 1964	Fresno, CA	Fresno State	28–0
15	November 27, 1965	Honolulu, HI	Fresno State	7–3
16	September 17, 1966	Fresno, CA	Fresno State	28–27
17	November 25, 1967	Honolulu, HI	Hawaii	29–19
18	November 28, 1970	Honolulu, HI	Hawaii	49–0
19	October 2, 1971	Honolulu, HI	Fresno State	19–8
20	September 22, 1973	Fresno, CA	Hawaii	13–10
21	November 23, 1974	Honolulu, HI	Hawaii	21–7
22	October 6, 1984	Honolulu, HI	Hawaii	27–15
23	October 24, 1985	Fresno, CA	Tie	24–24
24	November 15, 1986	Honolulu, HI	Hawaii	24–13
25	October 17, 1992	Honolulu, HI	Hawaii	47–45
26	November 13, 1993	Fresno, CA	Fresno State	45–21
27	September 24, 1994	Fresno, CA	Fresno State	31–16
28	November 4, 1995	Honolulu, HI	Hawaii	42–37
29	September 28, 1996	Fresno, CA	Fresno State	20–0

No.	Date	Location	Winner	Score
30	October 11, 1997	Honolulu, HI	Hawaii	28–16
31	November 14, 1998	Fresno, CA	Fresno State	51–12
32	November 13, 1999	Honolulu, HI	Hawaii	31–24^{2OT}
33	November 4, 2000	Fresno, CA	Fresno State	45–27
34	October 26, 2001	Honolulu, HI	Hawaii	38–34
35	October 25, 2002	Fresno, CA	Hawaii	31–21
36	October 11, 2003	Honolulu, HI	Hawaii	55–28
37	November 12, 2004	Fresno, CA	Fresno State	70–14
38	October 29, 2005	Honolulu, HI	#22 Fresno State	27–13
39	October 14, 2006	Fresno, CA	Hawaii	68–37
40	November 10, 2007	Honolulu, HI	#16 Hawaii	37–30
41	October 4, 2008	Fresno, CA	Hawaii	32–29^{OT}
42	October 10, 2009	Honolulu, HI	Fresno State	42–17
43	October 9, 2010	Fresno, CA	Hawaii	49–27
44	November 19, 2011	Honolulu, HI	Fresno State	24–21
45	November 10, 2012	Fresno, CA	Fresno State	45–10
46	September 28, 2013	Honolulu, HI	#25 Fresno State	42–37
47	November 29, 2014	Fresno, CA	Fresno State	28–21
48	November 14, 2015	Honolulu, HI	Fresno State	42–14
49	November 13, 2016	Fresno, CA	Hawaii	14–13
50	November 11, 2017	Honolulu, HI	Fresno State	31–21
51	October 27, 2018	Fresno, CA	Fresno State	50–20
52	November 2, 2019	Honolulu, HI	Fresno State	41–38
53	October 24, 2020	Fresno, CA	Hawaii	34–19
54	October 2, 2021	Honolulu, HI	Hawaii	27–24
55	November 5, 2022	Fresno, CA	Fresno State	55–13
56	November 2, 2024	Fresno, CA	Hawaii	21–20
57	September 20, 2025	Honolulu, HI	Fresno State	23–21
Series: Fresno State leads 31–25–1

== Overview ==
Fresno State and Hawaii first met in 1938 on the basis of the Pineapple Bowl (then not an NCAA-sanctioned bowl) being in Honolulu that year. Fresno was invited back for the 1941 Pineapple Bowl, which the Bulldogs won, 3–0. The rivalry went mostly unnoticed as Fresno State and Hawaii alternated winning streaks. It wasn't until 1992 under coach Bob Wagner that the rivalry took center stage as Fresno joined the Western Athletic Conference (WAC) in 1992 after the Bulldogs departed the Big West. However, much of the games went without bravado, with each team winning from anywhere from five to 20 points.

In 1999, Hawaii head coach June Jones and Fresno State head coach Pat Hill first faced each other at Aloha Stadium. That matchup featured Dan Robinson and Billy Volek, a future NFL star. Hawaii took the 13–7 halftime lead, but Fresno State tied the game at 21, sending it to overtime. Trailing 24–21, Eric Hannum, who missed a 29-yard field goal and an extra point, made a chip shot field goal to send the game to a second overtime. Robinson connected with Craig Stutzmann, giving Hawaii a 31–24 lead. The Rainbows (as UH was known back then) then used one last stand to take over first place in the WAC and secured a berth in the 1999 Oahu Bowl.

In a 2002 interview with The Honolulu Advertiser, Hill stated: "Hawai'i is a great game, but I don't know [if] you can call it a rivalry. I don't know what the biggest rivalry is. I don't know if there are any rivalries in this conference [the WAC] yet." Honolulu Star-Advertiser sports writer Ferd Lewis commented in 2010 that Fresno State was among "at best, merely flickering rivalries" for Hawaii against mainland teams. Yet Lewis has also described the series as having "a knock-down, drag-out history and an attitude." By 2014, both teams were in the Mountain West Conference and Hawaii struggled in conference play, in contrast to Fresno State winning the Mountain West Championship Game and contending for another appearance.

=== Screwdriver incident ===
There have been various urban legends surrounding the two programs, among the most notable about a screwdriver being thrown towards June Jones after Hawaii's October 25, 2002, victory over Fresno State. Although Jones claimed that he saw a screwdriver being thrown over his head from the Fresno State student section and falling on the field, a Fresno State investigation did not produce any witnesses from security or field crews. On October 31, 2002, Fresno State athletic director Scott Johnson issued an apology to Hawaii fans that stated in part: "...we believe that a screwdriver was thrown by one of our fans at the University of Hawai'i team bench."

That alleged incident inspired a "Golden Screwdriver" trophy being entered into a contest held by Fresno radio station KFIG "ESPN 940" to create a symbol of the Fresno State/Hawaii rivalry. Former Hawaii head coach Nick Rolovich expressed approval of such a trophy in 2016.

== The fans ==
Both teams have notoriously committed violence or close to it in recent years, especially after the 1999 game. Fresno State has a tradition called the Red Mile, in which the visiting team must walk outside the locker room to a chorus of jeers and verbal abuse. It has been noted that the NCAA has repeatedly called for Fresno State to stop this tradition due to allegations of violence and racial slurs, which the administration has continually denied. During Hawaii road games, the Red Mile is more full than usual, and many Hawaii players have claimed the fans, which are mostly students, instigated violence in the past.

Hawaii fans have also been implicated as well; Fresno State and Hawaii fan fights are also present at Aloha Stadium, especially pre-game and post-game. Fresno State fans who walk by Hawaii tailgaters often don't make it into the stadium without getting into a fight. In fact, a 2007 report by KITV said that Hawaii fans had committed acts of abuse toward Fresno State fans, which UH Athletics has continually denied to this day. Fresno fans also told Boise State fans, Hawaii's next opponent in 2007, to not attend the game. Allegations ended up being false as Honolulu Advertiser photographers caught pictures of Boise State and Hawaii fans mingling and sharing food before the game.

Former Hawaii linebacker Solomon Elimimian, following the 2008 upset of Fresno State, claimed that 12-year old Fresno State fans were shouting curse words and racial slurs at players, which was vehemently denied by Fresno media and Fresno State's athletics department.

== Notable games ==
1992: Hawaii and Fresno State meet for the first time as members of the Western Athletic Conference following the addition of the Bulldogs for 1992. Hawaii was victorious, 47–45.

1999: In one of the more memorable chapters of the rivalry, Hawaii defeated Fresno State, 31–24, in double overtime. This game propelled Hawaii to a share of the WAC title and gave UH a berth in the 1999 Oahu Bowl. The win followed a 51–12 loss the year before in Fresno.

2001: In the first of six meetings between the two schools in which one of the teams is ranked, future NFL number one draft pick David Carr committed two costly turnovers, leading to 14 Warrior points. Fresno State blew a 27–16 fourth quarter lead, which began with Hawaii quarterback and future head coach Nick Rolovich throwing a 22-yard touchdown pass to Channon Harris with an ensuing two-point conversion by Thero Mitchell. Carr then fumbled a snap on the Hawaii 3-yard line, which led to an 8-play, 96-yard drive in which Hawaii took the lead on Ashley Lelie's second touchdown of the night. Carr then sealed the #18 Bulldogs' fate with a fumble caused by Nate Jackson, leading to the winning Lelie score with thirteen seconds left in a 38–34 upset. Fresno State went on to finish in third place, while Hawaii finished runner-up in the WAC.

2008: Hawaii opened the season 1–3 in the post-Colt Brennan era and then traveled to Fresno, ranked #22 at the time, as the clear underdog. Hawaii blew a 26–9 lead and then eventually were tied 29–29 in the fourth quarter. But the Warriors blocked a late field goal, forcing the second overtime game in the series. Fresno State kicker Kevin Goessling missed a 40-yard field goal on the opening possession, but got a second chance thanks to a running into the kicker penalty. Goessling then missed the ensuing kick and Hawaii kicker Dan Kelly made his attempt upsetting Fresno State 32–29. It was the second time Hawaii upset a ranked Fresno State, and the first ever win versus a ranked opponent on the road.

2021: In an eerily similar storyline to the 2001 game, Fresno State blew a 24–10 lead after Jake Haener committed two turnovers in the final three possessions, leading to 17 unanswered Hawaii points. It also featured freshman quarterback Brayden Schager throwing two touchdown passes, one to tight end Caeleb Phillips, the other to Calvin Turner, to tie the game with 7:05 remaining. Haener was then strip-sacked by Khoury Bethley, leading to the eventual game-winning field goal by Matthew Shipley. Georgia transfer Hugh Nelson then sealed the Bulldogs' fate with an interception inside the five-yard line, propelling Hawaii to a 27–24 upset, marking the third time the Rainbow Warriors had beaten a ranked Fresno State team.

== See also ==
- List of NCAA college football rivalry games
