= 2000 Rose Bowl =

American college football game

2000 Rose Bowl presented by AT&T
- 86th Rose Bowl Game
Stanford Cardinal	Wisconsin Badgers
(8–3)	(9–2)
9	17
Head coach: Tyrone Willingham	Head coach: Barry Alvarez
AP / Coaches / BCS; 22 / 21 / 22	AP / Coaches / BCS; 4 / 4 / 7
	1	2	3	4	Total
Stanford	0	9	0	0	9
Wisconsin	0	3	7	7	17
- Date: January 1, 2000
- Season: 1999
- Stadium: Rose Bowl Stadium
- Location: Pasadena, California
- MVP: Ron Dayne (Wisconsin RB)
- National anthem: Stanford Band
- Referee: Dennis Hennigan (Big East)
- Halftime show: University of Wisconsin Marching Band, Stanford Band
- Attendance: 93,731

United States TV coverage
- Network: ABC
- Announcers: Keith Jackson, Dan Fouts, and Todd Harris

International TV coverage
- Network: ESPN Radio
- Announcers: Charley Steiner, Rod Gilmore, and Rob Stone

The 2000 Rose Bowl was a college football bowl game played on January 1, 2000. It was the 86th Rose Bowl game and was played on January 1, 2000 at the Rose Bowl Stadium in Pasadena, California. The game featured the Wisconsin Badgers defeating the Stanford Cardinal by a score of 17–9. Ron Dayne, the Wisconsin running back, was named the Rose Bowl Player of the Game for the second consecutive year.

== Pre-game activities ==
On October 26, 1999, the Pasadena Tournament of Roses selected Sophia Bush, a senior at Westridge School and a resident of Pasadena, to become the 82nd Rose Queen to reign over the 111th Rose Parade and the 86th Rose Bowl Game on the first New Year's Day of the 21st century.

The game was presided over by the 2000 Tournament of Roses Royal Court and Rose Parade Grand Marshal Roy L. Disney. Members of the royal court were: Princesses Lauren Beattie, La Canada Flintridge, La Canada High School; Caitlin Bogert, Pasadena, Flintridge Sacred Heart Academy; Grace Chen, San Marino, San Marino High School; Kellie Handy, South Pasadena, South Pasadena High School; Carol Huang, San Marino, San Marino High School; and Mariasol Pena, Arcadia, Arcadia High School. The 1999–2000 Tournament of Roses President was Kenneth H. Burrows.

== Teams ==
=== Wisconsin Badgers ===
Wisconsin entered the game as the sole champions of the Big Ten Conference, their first untied conference championship season since 1962 when they played in the 1963 Rose Bowl, although they had been conference co-champions in 1993 and 1998, appearing in the 1994 and 1999 Rose Bowls. The Wisconsin offense featured a powerful running game with 1999 Heisman Trophy winner Ron Dayne at running back.

=== Stanford Cardinal ===
Stanford entered the game as the champions of the Pacific-10 Conference. It was their first conference championship season since 1971 and their first Rose Bowl since 1972.

== Game summary ==
Both teams punted on their first three possessions before they exchanged field goals. Stanford's came on a drive that had started on its own 3-yard line and Wisconsin's was set up by a diving catch by Chris Chambers on a 36-yard completion from Brooks Bollinger.

Stanford took a 9–3 halftime lead on a touchdown by full back Kerry Carter, which came on the Cardinal's third consecutive rushing attempt from the Wisconsin 1-yard line. (The snap on the extra-point attempt was botched.)

On the first drive of the second half, the Badgers accounted for the only lead change of the game, when they scored a touchdown on an 80-yard drive. The second play of the drive was a 64-yard run by Heisman Trophy winner Ron Dayne, who had been held to 46 yards in the first half.

The closest Stanford came to scoring in the second half was on a third-quarter field-goal attempt, which was blocked.

After both teams exchanged punts two more times, Wisconsin scored its second touchdown of the game, which was aided by a fourth-down completion from Bollinger to John Sigmund, to extend its lead to 17–9 in the fourth quarter.

After the Badgers failed to go up by two scores on a field-goal attempt, Stanford retained possession on its 20-yard line with 2:19 left to play. The Cardinal turned the ball over on downs, however, after committing two false-start and one delay-of-game penalties, and allowing a fourth-down sack of quarterback Todd Husak.

With this win, which was Wisconsin's third Rose Bowl victory in seven years, the Badgers "became the first Big Ten team to win consecutive Rose Bowls." Ron Dayne rushed for 200 yards (154 of which came in the second half), while Stanford overall was "held to 259 yards of total offense after averaging 467 per game" that season. This output included a Rose-Bowl-record "minus-5 yards on 27 rushes“ by the Cardinal.

== Scoring summary ==
=== First quarter ===
- No Score

=== Second quarter ===
- Stanford – Mike Biselli 28-yard field goal 13:26 3–0 Stanford
- Wisconsin – Vitaly Pisetsky 31-yard field goal 9:19 3–3
- Stanford – Kerry Carter 1-yard run (two-point conversion failed) 2:03 9–3 Stanford

=== Third quarter ===
- Wisconsin – Ron Dayne 4-yard run (Pisetsky kick) 12:57 10–9 UW

=== Fourth quarter ===
- Wisconsin – Brooks Bollinger 1-yard run (Pisetsky kick) 7:22 17–9 UW

== Aftermath ==
Ron Dayne was named the Rose Bowl MVP for the second time (the first time being the 1999 Rose Bowl), becoming only the third player in the history of the Rose Bowl to repeat as MVP. To this day, he is the only player from a Big Ten Conference team to accomplish this feat: Bob Schloredt of the Washington Huskies (AAWU) was the first, Charles White of USC (Pac-10) was the second, and Vince Young of the Texas Longhorns (Big 12) has subsequently become the fourth.

The two teams would go on to face off again exactly thirteen years later in the 2013 Rose Bowl, with Barry Alvarez returning to serve as interim head coach for Wisconsin, but this time, Stanford would win 20–14.

2000 Rose Queen Sophia Bush went on to become a successful actress, starring for nine seasons as Brooke Davis on One Tree Hill, and later as Detective Erin Lindsay on Chicago P.D..

== Cultural references ==
- The animated series Futurama occasionally references this game, as part of a running gag that the mother of Philip J. Fry is a devout football fan.
  - The episode "Jurassic Bark", in which the (incorrectly inversed) 2nd-quarter score is briefly shown on Fry's parents' television, while Fry's mother wears a "cheesehead" hat to show loyalty to Wisconsin.
  - The episode "The Luck of the Fryrish", in which Fry's mother mentions the day Wisconsin won the Rose Bowl 17–9 in reference to the day Fry disappeared.
  - The episode "Game of Tones" ends with a dream sequence of Fry and his mother watching the end of the game.
