= 1999 Stanford Cardinal football team =

American college football season

1999 Stanford Cardinal football

Pac-10 champion

Rose Bowl, L 9–17 vs. Wisconsin
- Conference: Pacific-10 Conference

Ranking
- Coaches: No. 24
- Record: 8–4 (7–1 Pac-10)
- Head coach: Tyrone Willingham (5th season)
- Offensive coordinator: Bill Diedrick (2nd season)
- Offensive scheme: West Coast
- Defensive coordinator: Kent Baer (1st season)
- Base defense: 4–3
- Home stadium: Stanford Stadium

1999 Pacific-10 Conference football standings
	Conf.			Overall
Team	W		L	W		L
Stanford $	7	–	1	8	–	4
No. 19 Oregon	6	–	2	9	–	3
Washington	6	–	2	7	–	5
Arizona State	5	–	3	6	–	6
Oregon State	4	–	4	7	–	5
Arizona	3	–	5	6	–	6
USC	3	–	5	6	–	6
California	3	–	5	4	–	7
UCLA	2	–	6	4	–	7
Washington State	1	–	7	3	–	9
$ – BCS representative as conference champion; Cal later vacated 4 wins (3 in conference) due to NCAA sanctions.; Rankings from AP Poll

The 1999 Stanford Cardinal football team represented Stanford University as a member of the Pacific-10 Conference (Pac-10) during 1999 NCAA Division I-A football season. Led by fifth-year head coach Tyrone Willingham, the Cardinal compiled an overall record of 8–4 with a mark of 7–1 in conference play, winning the Pac-10 title, the program's first since the 1971 season. Stanford earned a berth in the Rose Bowl earning its first Rose Bowl appearance since the 1971 season, and its first-ever Bowl Championship Series (BCS) appearance. The Cardinal lost to game to Wisconsin. The team played home games at Stanford Stadium in Stanford, California.

== Schedule ==
Date	Time	Opponent	Rank	Site	TV	Result	Attendance	Source
September 4	9:00 a.m.	at Texas*		Darrell K Royal–Texas Memorial Stadium; Austin, TX	ABC	L 17–69	80,654	
September 11	7:15 p.m.	Washington State		Stanford Stadium; Stanford, CA	FSN	W 54–17	36,592	
September 18	7:15 p.m.	at No. 19 Arizona		Arizona Stadium; Tucson, AZ	FSN	W 50–22	47,273	
September 25	2:00 p.m.	No. 18 UCLA		Stanford Stadium; Stanford, CA (rivalry)		W 42–32	47,432	
October 2	2:00 p.m.	San Jose State*		Stanford Stadium; Stanford, CA (rivalry)		L 39–44	38,261	
October 16	2:00 p.m.	Oregon State^{†}		Stanford Stadium; Stanford, CA		W 21–17	37,419	
October 23	12:30 p.m.	at USC		Los Angeles Memorial Coliseum; Los Angeles, CA (rivalry)	ABC	W 35–31	57,494	
October 30	12:30 p.m.	at Washington		Husky Stadium; Seattle, WA	ABC	L 30–35	70,308	
November 13	3:30 p.m.	at Arizona State		Sun Devil Stadium; Tempe, AZ	FSN	W 50–30	53,663	
November 20	12:30 p.m.	California		Stanford Stadium; Stanford, CA (Big Game)	FSN	W 31–13	80,746	
November 27	5:00 p.m.	Notre Dame*		Stanford Stadium; Stanford, CA (rivalry)	ABC	W 40–37	57,980	
January 1, 2000	2:00 p.m.	vs. No. 4 Wisconsin*	No. 22	Rose Bowl; Pasadena, CA (Rose Bowl)	ABC	L 9–17	93,731	
*Non-conference game; ^{†}Homecoming; Rankings from AP Poll released prior to the game; All times are in Pacific time

== Game summaries ==
=== At Texas ===
	1	2	3	4	Total
Cardinal	7	3	0	7	17
Longhorns	21	27	7	14	69

=== Washington State ===
	1	2	3	4	Total
Cougars	7	3	7	0	17
Cardinal	17	21	14	2	54

=== At Arizona ===
	1	2	3	4	Total
Cardinal					0
No. 19 Wildcats					0

=== UCLA ===
	1	2	3	4	Total
No. 18 Bruins	0	3	14	15	32
Cardinal	7	14	14	7	42

=== San Jose State ===
	1	2	3	4	Total
Spartans	14	3	14	13	44
Cardinal	6	9	14	10	39

=== Oregon State ===
	1	2	3	4	Total
Beavers	0	7	0	10	17
Cardinal	0	0	7	14	21

=== At USC ===
	1	2	3	4	Total
Cardinal	0	14	14	7	35
Trojans	21	3	7	0	31

=== At Washington ===
	1	2	3	4	Total
No. 25 Cardinal					0
Huskies					0

=== At Arizona State ===
	1	2	3	4	Total
Cardinal	14	12	21	3	50
Sun Devils	3	14	7	6	30

=== California ===
	1	2	3	4	Total
Golden Bears	7	6	0	0	13
Cardinal	7	14	0	10	31

=== Notre Dame ===
	1	2	3	4	Total
Fighting Irish	7	14	8	8	37
Cardinal	17	6	7	10	40

=== Vs. Wisconsin (Rose Bowl) ===
	1	2	3	4	Total
No. 22 Cardinal	0	9	0	0	9
No. 4 Badgers	0	3	7	7	17

== Roster ==
1999 Stanford Cardinal football team roster
Players
Coaches
Offense

Pos.	#	Name	Class
RB	34	Brian Allen	So
RB	28	Kerry Carter	Fr
QB	12	Randy Fasani	So
OT	75	Eric Heitmann	So
QB	7	Todd Husak	Sr
WR	5	Troy Walters	Sr

Defense

Pos.	#	Name	Class
DT	77	Willie Howard	Jr
LB	97	Riall Johnson	Jr
DE	74	Jim Telesmanich	Jr
FS	13	Tank Williams	So

Special teams

Pos.	#	Name	Class

Head coach

- Tyrone Willingham

Coordinators/assistant coaches

- Bill Diedrick – Offensive coordinator and quarterbacks
- Buzz Preston – Running backs
- Mose Rison – wide receivers
- Tom Brattan – Offensive line (centers and guards)
- Chuck Moller – Tight ends and offensive line (tackles)
- Kent Baer – Defensive coordinator and linebackers
- Phil Zacharias – Defensive ends and special teams coordinator
- Denny Schuler – Defensive backs
- Dave Tipton – Recruiting coordinator

Legend

- (C) Team captain
- (S) Suspended
- (I) Ineligible
- Injured
- Redshirt

Roster

== Awards and honors ==
- Troy Walters, 1999 consensus All-American and Fred Biletnikoff Award winner as college football's best wide receiver
