= 1999 Oahu Bowl =

1999 Jeep Oahu Bowl
Hawaii Rainbow Warriors	Oregon State Beavers
(8–4)	(7–4)
Western Athletic	Pacific-10
23	17
Head coach: June Jones	Head coach: Dennis Erickson
	1	2	3	4	Total
Hawaii	0	10	10	3	23
Oregon State	7	3	0	7	17
- Date: December 25, 1999
- Season: 1999
- Stadium: Aloha Stadium
- Location: Honolulu, Hawaii
- Favorite: Oregon State by 9 points
- Referee: R.G. Detillier (C-USA)
- Attendance: 40,974
- Payout: US$750,000 per team

United States TV coverage
- Network: ESPN
- Announcers: Steve Levy, Todd Christensen, and Larry Biel

The 1999 Jeep Oahu Bowl was a college football bowl game, played as part of the bowl game schedule of the 1999 NCAA Division I-A football season. The second edition of the Oahu Bowl, it was the latter part of a Christmas Day doubleheader at Aloha Stadium in Honolulu, Hawaiʻi, preceded by the Aloha Bowl. Televised by ESPN, the game on December 25 matched the Hawaiʻi Warriors, co-champions of the Western Athletic Conference (WAC), and the favored Oregon State Beavers of the Pacific-10 Conference (Pac-10), who were making their first bowl game appearance in 35 years.

Tied at ten at halftime, Hawaiʻi scored thirteen straight points to win 23–17 and finished the season at 9–4; the Beavers fell to 7–5. The victory capped one of the most memorable seasons in school history as Hawaiʻi had seen an improvement of nine wins over the previous winless season in 1998.

== Scoring summary ==
First quarter

- OSU - Ken Simonton 1-yard run (Ryan Cesca kick) (8:08). 7–0 OSU

Second quarter

- HAW - Eric Hannum 26-yard FG. (12:40). 7–3 OSU
- HAW - Channon Harris 9-yard pass from Dan Robinson (Hannum kick). (6:05). 10–7 HAW
- OSU - Cesca 37-yard FG. (00:00). 10–10 Tie

Third quarter

- HAW - Harris 30-yard pass from Robinson (Hannum kick). (6:30). 17–10 HAW
- HAW - Hannum 22-yard FG. (2:10). 20–10 HAW

Fourth quarter

- HAW - Hannum 35-yard FG. (2:58). 23–10 HAW
- OSU - Simonton 13-yard run (Cesca kick) (1:27). 23–17 HAW
