= 1999 Washington Huskies football team =

American college football season

1999 Washington Huskies football

Holiday Bowl, L 20–24 vs. Kansas State
- Conference: Pacific-10 Conference
- Record: 7–5 (6–2 Pac-10)
- Head coach: Rick Neuheisel (1st season)
- Offensive coordinator: Karl Dorrell (1st season)
- Offensive scheme: Pro-style
- Defensive coordinator: Tim Hundley (1st season)
- Base defense: Multiple
- Captains: Lester Towns; Jabari Issa; Marques Tuiasosopo
- Home stadium: Husky Stadium

1999 Pacific-10 Conference football standings
	Conf.			Overall
Team	W		L	W		L
Stanford $	7	–	1	8	–	4
No. 19 Oregon	6	–	2	9	–	3
Washington	6	–	2	7	–	5
Arizona State	5	–	3	6	–	6
Oregon State	4	–	4	7	–	5
Arizona	3	–	5	6	–	6
USC	3	–	5	6	–	6
California	3	–	5	4	–	7
UCLA	2	–	6	4	–	7
Washington State	1	–	7	3	–	9
$ – BCS representative as conference champion; Cal later vacated 4 wins (3 in conference) due to NCAA sanctions.; Rankings from AP Poll

The 1999 Washington Huskies football team represented the University of Washington in the 1999 NCAA Division I-A football season. Led by first-year head coach Rick Neuheisel, they played their home games at Husky Stadium. The Huskies finished the regular season at 7–4, tied for second (6–2) in the Pacific-10 Conference.

At the Holiday Bowl in San Diego, Washington lost, 24–20, to No. 7 Kansas State of the Big 12 Conference.

== Schedule ==
Date	Time	Opponent	Rank	Site	TV	Result	Attendance
September 9	5:00 p.m.	at BYU*		Cougar Stadium; Provo, UT	ESPN	L 28–35	65,726
September 18	3:30 p.m.	Air Force*		Husky Stadium; Seattle, WA	FSN	L 21–31	70,019
September 25	12:30 p.m.	Colorado*		Husky Stadium; Seattle, WA	ABC	W 31–24	72,068
October 2	7:15 p.m.	No. 25 Oregon		Husky Stadium; Seattle, WA (rivalry)	FSN	W 34–20	72,581
October 9	3:30 p.m.	at Oregon State		Reser Stadium; Corvallis, OR	FSN	W 47–21	35,470
October 16	4:00 p.m.	Arizona State		Husky Stadium; Seattle, WA	ABC	L 7–28	72,789
October 23	12:30 p.m.	at California		California Memorial Stadium; Berkeley, CA		W 31–27	43,000
October 30	12:30 p.m.	No. 25 Stanford^{†}		Husky Stadium; Seattle, WA	ABC	W 35–30	70,308
November 6	12:30 p.m.	at Arizona		Arizona Stadium; Tucson, AZ	ABC	W 33–25	56,614
November 13	12:30 p.m.	at UCLA	No. 23	Rose Bowl; Pasadena, CA	ABC	L 20–23 ^{OT}	55,705
November 20	12:30 p.m.	Washington State		Husky Stadium; Seattle, WA (Apple Cup)	ABC	W 24–14	72,973
December 29	5:30 p.m.	vs. No. 7 Kansas State*		Qualcomm Stadium; San Diego, CA (Holiday Bowl)	ESPN	L 20–24	57,118
*Non-conference game; ^{†}Homecoming; Rankings from AP Poll released prior to the game; All times are in Pacific time; Source:

== Game summaries ==
=== Washington State ===
Washington State at Washington

Team	1	2	3	4	Total
Washington State	0	6	0	8	14
• Washington	10	7	0	7	24

- Date: Saturday, November 20
- Location: Husky Stadium, Seattle
- Game attendance: 72,973
- Source: USA Today

Scoring summary
1	5:38	WASH	John Anderson 22 yard field goal	WASH 3-0
1	0:31	WASH	Maurice Shaw 4 yard run (John Anderson kick)	WASH 10-0
2	13:45	WSU	Rian Lindell 22 yard field goal	WASH 10-3
2	6:05	WSU	Rian Lindell 28 yard field goal	WASH 10-6
2	4:51	WASH	Joe Jarzynka 55 yard pass from Marques Tuiasosopo (John Anderson kick)	WASH 17-6
4	10:16	WASH	Paul Arnold 80 yard run (John Anderson kick)	WASH 24-6
4	7:22	WSU	Adam Hawkins 19 yard run (Steve Birnbaum to Paul Mencke pass)	WASH 24-14

== Roster ==
1999 Washington Huskies football team roster
Players
Coaches
Offense

Pos.	#	Name	Class
RB	20	Paul Arnold	Fr
C	64	Kyle Benn	So
OT	74	Wes Call	Jr
RB	29	Braxton Cleman	So
OT	69	Kurth Connell	Sr
FB	47	Pat Conniff	Jr
WR	84	Todd Elstrom	So
WR	9	Gerald Harris	Jr
WR	4	Ja'Warren Hooker	Jr
RB	1	Willie Hurst	So
WR	89	Chris Juergens	So
RB	21	Joe Jarzynka	Sr
WR	80	Dane Looker	Sr
G	55	Rock Nelson	So
QB	3	Cody Pickett	Fr
WR	86	Patrick Reddick	So
QB	12	J.K. Scott	So
TE	14	Jerramy Stevens	Fr
QB	11	Marques Tuiasosopo (C)	Jr
OT	68	Elliot Silvers	Jr
G	71	Chad Ward	Jr
TE	87	Kevin Ware	Fr

Defense

Pos.	#	Name	Class
SS	9	Hakim Akbar	Jr
CB	10	Toure Butler	Jr
LB	24	Derrell Daniels	Jr
LB	27	Marques Hairston	Sr
DT	95	Jabari Issa (C)	Sr
CB	12	Omare Lowe	So
LB	4	Jeremiah Pharms	Jr
LB	17	Lester Towns (C)	Sr
DT	70	Larry Tripplett	So
DT	78	Mac Tuiaea	Sr
CB	23	Anthony Vontoure	So
FS	25	Curtis Williams	Jr

Special teams

Pos.	#	Name	Class
PK	15	John Anderson	Fr
P	16	Ryan Fleming	Jr

Head coach

- Rick Neuheisel (1st year)

Coordinators/assistant coaches

- Keith Gilbertson (AHC, OL, TE)
- Tim Hundley (DC, ILB)
- Karl Dorrell (OC, WR)
- Steve Axman (QB)
- Randy Hart (DL)
- Bobby Hauck (S, ST)
- Chuck Heater (CB)
- Wayne Moses (RB)
- Tom Williams (OLB)
- Ikaika Malloe (GA)

Legend

- (C) Team captain
- (S) Suspended
- (I) Ineligible
- Injured
- Redshirt

Roster
Last update: 2020-01-30

== NFL draft ==
Two Huskies were selected in the 2000 NFL draft, which lasted seven rounds (254 selections).

Player	Position	Round	Overall	Franchise
Jabari Issa	DE	6th	176	Arizona Cardinals
Lester Towns	LB	7th	221	Carolina Panthers
