= Windrell Hayes =

American football player (born 1976)

No. 86, 16
- Position: Wide receiver

Personal information
- Born: December 14, 1976 (age 49); Stockton, California, U.S.

Career information
- High school: Franklin (Stockton)
- College: USC
- NFL draft: 2000: 5th round, 143rd overall pick

Career history
- New York Jets (2000–2001); Green Bay Packers (2002)

Career NFL statistics
- Receptions: 6
- Receiving yards: 126
- Rushing yards: 2
- Stats at Pro Football Reference

Windrell Mansa Hayes (born December 14, 1976) is an American former professional football player who was a wide receiver in the National Football League (NFL). He was selected by the New York Jets in the fifth round of the 2000 NFL draft. He played college football for the San Jose State Spartans and USC Trojans.

Hayes also played for the Green Bay Packers.
