= 1999 NCAA Division I-A football rankings =

- Season: 1999
- Bowl season: 1999–00 bowl games
- Preseason No. 1: Florida State
- End of season champions: Florida State
- Conference with most teams in final AP poll: Big Ten (7)

Two human polls and one formulaic ranking make up the 1999 NCAA Division I-A football rankings. Unlike most sports, college football's governing body, the National Collegiate Athletic Association (NCAA), does not bestow a National Championship title for Division I-A football. That title is primarily bestowed by different polling agencies. There are several polls that currently exist. The main weekly polls are the AP Poll and Coaches Poll. About halfway through the season the Bowl Championship Series (BCS) standings are released.

== Legend ==
	Increase in ranking
	Decrease in ranking
	Not ranked previous week
	Selected for BCS National Championship Game
(#–#)	Win–loss record
(Italics)	Number of first place votes
т	Tied with team above or below also with this symbol

== AP Poll ==
	Preseason Aug 15	Week 1 Aug 30	Week 2 Sep 6	Week 3 Sep 12	Week 4 Sep 19	Week 5 Sep 26	Week 6 Oct 3	Week 7 Oct 10	Week 8 Oct 17	Week 9 Oct 24	Week 10 Oct 31	Week 11 Nov 7	Week 12 Nov 14	Week 13 Nov 21	Week 14 Nov 28	Week 15 Dec 5	Week 16 (Final) Jan 5	
1.	Florida State (48)	Florida State (1–0) (28)	Florida State (1–0) (31)	Florida State (2–0) (49)	Florida State (3–0) (59)	Florida State (4–0) (61)	Florida State (5–0) (64)	Florida State (6–0) (63)	Florida State (7–0) (62)	Florida State (8–0) (55)	Florida State (9–0) (55)	Florida State (9–0) (66)	Florida State (10–0) (63)	Florida State (11–0) (66)	Florida State (11–0) (64)	Florida State (11–0) (64)	Florida State (12–0) (70)	1.
2.	Tennessee (15)	Penn State (1–0) (26)	Penn State (2–0) (26)	Tennessee (1–0) (13)	Penn State (4–0) (7)	Penn State (5–0) (5)	Penn State (5–0) (5)	Penn State (6–0) (6)	Penn State (7–0) (6)	Penn State (8–0) (10)	Penn State (9–0) (9)	Virginia Tech (8–0) (4)	Virginia Tech (9–0) (6)	Virginia Tech (10–0) (4)	Virginia Tech (11–0) (6)	Virginia Tech (11–0) (6)	Virginia Tech (11–1)	2.
3.	Penn State (4)	Tennessee (0–0) (13)	Tennessee (1–0) (11)	Penn State (3–0) (6)	Florida (3–0) (3)	Florida (4–0) (3)	Michigan (5–0)	Nebraska (6–0)	Nebraska (6–0)	Virginia Tech (6–0) (5)	Virginia Tech (7–0) (6)	Tennessee (7–1)	Florida (9–1)	Nebraska (9–1)	Nebraska (10–1)	Nebraska (11–1)	Nebraska (12–1)	3.
4.	Arizona (1)	Florida (0–0) (1)	Florida (1–0) (1)	Florida (2–0) (1)	Michigan (3–0)	Michigan (4–0)	Nebraska (5–0)	Virginia Tech (5–0) (1)	Virginia Tech (6–0) (2)	Tennessee (5–1)	Tennessee (6–1)	Florida (8–1)	Nebraska (9–1)	Wisconsin (9–2)	Wisconsin (9–2)	Wisconsin (9–2)	Wisconsin (10–2)	4.
5.	Florida (1)	Nebraska (0–0)	Nebraska (1–0)	Nebraska (2–0)	Texas A&M (2–0)	Texas A&M (3–0)	Virginia Tech (4–0)	Michigan State (6–0)	Tennessee (4–1)	Florida (6–1)	Florida (7–1)	Kansas State (9–0)	Wisconsin (9–2)	Florida (9–2)	Florida (9–2)	Alabama (10–2)	Michigan (10–2)	5.
6.	Nebraska	Texas A&M (0–0)	Michigan (1–0)	Michigan (2–0)	Nebraska (3–0)	Nebraska (4–0)	Tennessee (3–1)	Tennessee (4–1)	Florida (6–1)	Kansas State (7–0)	Kansas State (8–0)	Penn State (9–1)	Texas (9–2)	Tennessee (8–2)	Tennessee (9–2)	Tennessee (9–2)	Kansas State (11–1)	6.
7.	Texas A&M	Michigan (0–0)	Texas A&M (1–0)	Texas A&M (1–0)	Tennessee (1–1)	Tennessee (2–1)	Georgia Tech (3–1)	Florida (5–1)	Kansas State (6–0)	Georgia Tech (5–1)	Georgia Tech (6–1)	Nebraska (8–1)	Tennessee (7–2)	Texas (9–2)	Alabama (9–2)	Kansas State (10–1)	Michigan State (10–2)	7.
8.	Michigan	Miami (FL) (1–0)	Miami (FL) (2–0)	Miami (FL) (2–0)	Virginia Tech (2–0) (1)	Virginia Tech (3–0) (1)	Florida (4–1)	Georgia Tech (4–1)	Georgia Tech (5–1)	Mississippi State (7–0) т	Mississippi State (7–0)	Mississippi State (8–0)	Alabama (8–2)	Alabama (9–2)	Kansas State (10–1)	Michigan (9–2)	Alabama (10–3)	8.
9.	Ohio State	Wisconsin (0–0)	Wisconsin (1–0)	Wisconsin (2–0)	Miami (FL) (2–1)	Georgia Tech (2–1)	Kansas State (4–0)	Kansas State (5–0)	Michigan (5–1)	Nebraska (6–1) т	Nebraska (7–1)	Wisconsin (8–2)	Kansas State (9–1)	Kansas State (10–1)	Michigan (9–2)	Michigan State (9–2)	Tennessee (9–3)	9.
10.	Wisconsin	Georgia Tech (0–0)	Georgia Tech (1–0)	Virginia Tech (2–0) (1)	Georgia Tech (2–1)	Georgia (3–0)	Georgia (4–0)	Michigan (5–1)	Alabama (5–1)	Georgia (6–1)	Wisconsin (7–2)	Texas (8–2)	Michigan (8–2)	Michigan (9–2)	Michigan State (9–2)	Florida (9–3)	Marshall (13–0)	10.
11.	Georgia Tech	Virginia Tech (0–0) (1)	Virginia Tech (1–0) (1)	Georgia (2–0)	Georgia (2–0)	Purdue (4–0)	Michigan State (5–0)	Alabama (4–1)	Michigan State (6–1)	Wisconsin (6–2)	Texas (7–2)	Alabama (7–2)	Marshall (10–0)	Michigan State (9–2)	Marshall (11–0)	Marshall (12–0)	Penn State (10–3)	11.
12.	Miami (FL)	Georgia (0–0)	Georgia (1–0)	Georgia Tech (1–0)	Ohio State (2–1)	Ohio State (3–1)	Alabama (4–1)	Mississippi State (6–0)	Mississippi State (6–0)	Texas (6–2)	Alabama (6–2)	Marshall (9–0)	Mississippi State (8–1)	Marshall (10–0)	Texas (9–3)	Minnesota (8–3)	Florida (9–4)	12.
13.	Virginia Tech (1)	Ohio State (0–1)	Ohio State (0–1)	Ohio State (1–1)	Purdue (3–0)	Kansas State (3–0)	Texas A&M (3–1)	Texas A&M (4–1)	Texas A&M (5–1)	Marshall (7–0)	Marshall (8–0)	Georgia Tech (6–2)	Penn State (9–2)	Minnesota (8–3)	Minnesota (8–3)	Penn State (9–3)	Mississippi State (10–2)	13.
14.	Georgia	Colorado (0–0)	UCLA (1–0)	Purdue (2–0)	Arkansas (2–0)	Michigan State (4–0)	Mississippi State (5–0)	Georgia (4–1)	Georgia (5–1)	Alabama (5–2)	Georgia (6–2)	Georgia (6–2)	Georgia Tech (7–2)	Southern Miss (8–3)	Penn State (9–3)	Texas (9–4)	Southern Miss (9–3)	14.
15.	Colorado	Arizona (0–1)	Arkansas (1–0)	Arkansas (1–0)	Kansas State (2–0)	Texas (4–1)	Marshall (5–0)	Marshall (5–0)	Marshall (6–0)	Michigan (5–2)	BYU (7–1)	BYU (8–1)	Michigan State (8–2)	Penn State (9–3)	Southern Miss (8–3)	Mississippi State (9–2)	Miami (FL) (9–4)	15.
16.	UCLA	Notre Dame (1–0)	Notre Dame (1–1)	Kansas State (1–0)	USC (2–0)	Mississippi State (4–0)	East Carolina (5–0)	Syracuse (5–1)	Purdue (5–2)	BYU (6–1)	Michigan (6–2)	Michigan (7–2)	Ole Miss (7–2)	Georgia (7–3)	Mississippi State (9–2)	Southern Miss (8–3)	Georgia (8–4)	16.
17.	Texas	UCLA (0–0)	Kansas State (0–0)	USC (1–0)	BYU (2–0)	Marshall (4–0)	Purdue (4–1)	Wisconsin (4–2)	Wisconsin (5–2)	East Carolina (6–1)	Purdue (6–3)	Michigan State (7–2)	Minnesota (7–3)	Arkansas (7–3)	Georgia Tech (8–3)	Georgia Tech (8–3)	Arkansas (8–4)	17.
18.	Notre Dame	Arkansas (0–0)	USC (1–0)	Alabama (2–0)	UCLA (2–1)	Miami (FL) (2–2)	Syracuse (4–1)	Ohio State (4–2)	Texas (5–2)	Purdue (5–3)	East Carolina (7–1)	Ole Miss (7–2)	Southern Miss (7–3)	Mississippi State (8–2)	Texas A&M (8–3)	Texas A&M (8–3)	Minnesota (8–4)	18.
19.	USC	Kansas State (0–0)	Arizona (1–1)	Arizona (2–1)	Michigan State (3–0)	East Carolina (4–0)	Miami (FL) (2–2)	Texas (5–2)	BYU (5–1)	Michigan State (6–2)	Michigan State (6–2)	Miami (FL) (5–3)	BYU (8–2) т	Purdue (7–4)	Purdue (7–4)	Purdue (7–4)	Oregon (9–3)	19.
20.	Alabama т	Alabama (0–0)	Purdue (1–0)	NC State (3–0)	Wisconsin (2–1)	Arkansas (2–1)	Wisconsin (3–2)	Purdue (4–2)	East Carolina (5–1)	Southern Miss (5–2)	Ohio State (6–3)	Minnesota (6–3)	Purdue (6–4) т	Georgia Tech (7–3)	East Carolina (9–2)	East Carolina (9–2)	Georgia Tech (8–4)	20.
21.	Kansas State т	USC (0–0)	Alabama (1–0)	UCLA (1–1)	Marshall (3–0)	Alabama (3–1)	Ohio State (3–2)	BYU (4–1)	Southern Miss (4–2)	Ohio State (5–3)	Texas A&M (6–2)	Southern Miss (6–3)	Georgia (6–3)	East Carolina (9–2)	Georgia (7–4)	Georgia (7–4)	Texas (9–5)	21.
22.	Arkansas	Purdue (0–0)	Virginia (1–0)	Arizona State (1–0)	Texas (3–1)	Syracuse (3–1)	USC (3–1)	Ole Miss (5–1)	Ohio State (4–3)	Texas A&M (5–2)	Miami (FL) (4–3)	Purdue (6–4)	Arkansas (6–3)	Boston College (8–2)	Stanford (8–3)	Stanford (8–3)	Ole Miss(8–4)	22.
23.	Purdue	Virginia (0–0)	NC State (2–0)	Colorado State (2–0)	Mississippi State (3–0)	Oklahoma (3–0)	Texas (4–2)	East Carolina (5–1)	Miami (FL) (2–3)	Miami (FL) (3–3)	Ole Miss (6–2)	Washington (6–3)	East Carolina (8–2)	Ole Miss (7–3)	Miami (FL) (7–4)	Miami (FL) (8–4)	Texas A&M (8–4)	23.
24.	Virginia	NC State (1–0)	Colorado State (1–0)	Notre Dame (1–2)	Air Force (2–0)	Virginia (3–1)	BYU (3–1)	Miami (FL) (2–3)	Minnesota (5–1)	Oklahoma (4–2)	Notre Dame (5–3)	East Carolina (7–2)	Texas A&M (7–3)	Texas A&M (7–3)	Arkansas (7–4)	Arkansas (7–4)	Illinois (8–4)	24.
25.	Arizona State	Arizona State (0–0)	Arizona State (0–0)	BYU (1–0)	NC State (3–1)	Oregon (3–1)	Minnesota (4–0)	Southern Miss (3–2)	Ole Miss (5–2)	Ole Miss (5–2)	Southern Miss (5–3)	Ohio State (6–4)	Boston College (7–2)	Louisiana Tech (8–2)	Boston College (8–3)	Boston College (8–3)	Purdue (7–5)	25.
	Preseason Aug 15	Week 1 Aug 30	Week 2 Sep 6	Week 3 Sep 12	Week 4 Sep 19	Week 5 Sep 26	Week 6 Oct 3	Week 7 Oct 10	Week 8 Oct 17	Week 9 Oct 24	Week 10 Oct 31	Week 11 Nov 7	Week 12 Nov 14	Week 13 Nov 21	Week 14 Nov 28	Week 15 Dec 5	Week 16 (Final) Jan 5	
		Dropped: Texas	Dropped: Colorado	Dropped: Virginia	Dropped: Alabama; Arizona; Arizona State; Colorado State; Notre Dame	Dropped: USC; BYU; UCLA; Wisconsin; Air Force; NC State	Dropped: Arkansas; Oklahoma; Virginia; Oregon	Dropped: USC; Minnesota	Dropped: Syracuse	Dropped: Minnesota	Dropped: Oklahoma	Dropped: Texas A&M; Notre Dame	Dropped: Miami (FL); Washington; Ohio State	Dropped: BYU	Dropped: Ole Miss; Louisiana Tech	None	Dropped: East Carolina; Stanford; Boston College	

== Coaches Poll ==
	Preseason Aug 6	Week 2 Sep 7	Week 3 Sep 13	Week 4 Sep 20	Week 5 Sep 27	Week 6 Oct 4	Week 7 Oct 11	Week 8 Oct 18	Week 9 October 25	Week 10 Nov 1	Week 11 Nov 8	Week 12 Nov 15	Week 13 Nov 22	Week 14 Nov 29	Week 15 Dec 6	Week 16 (Final) Jan 6	
1.	Florida State (36)	Florida State (1–0)	Florida State (2–0) (44)	Florida State (3–0) (50)	Florida State (4–0) (52)	Florida State (5–0) (53)	Florida State (6–0) (53)	Florida State (7–0) (52)	Florida State (8–0) (41)	Florida State (9–0) (44)	Florida State (9–0) (57)	Florida State (10–0) (58)	Florida State (11–0) (57)	Florida State (11–0) (56)	Florida State (11–0) (56)	Florida State (12–0) (59)	1.
2.	Tennessee (13)	Penn State (2–0)	Tennessee (1–0) (8)	Penn State (4–0) (6)	Penn State (5–0) (5)	Penn State (5–0) (6)	Penn State (6–0) (6)	Penn State (7–0) (7)	Penn State (8–0) (16)	Penn State (9–0) (13)	Virginia Tech (8–0) (1)	Virginia Tech (9–0) (1)	Virginia Tech (10–0) (2)	Virginia Tech (11–0) (3)	Virginia Tech (11–0) (3)	Nebraska (12–1)	2.
3.	Arizona (2)	Tennessee (1–0)	Penn State (3–0) (7)	Florida (3–0) (3)	Florida (4–0) (2)	Michigan (5–0)	Nebraska (6–0)	Nebraska (6–0)	Virginia Tech (6–0)	Virginia Tech (7–0) (2)	Tennessee (7–1) (1)	Florida (9–1)	Nebraska (9–1)	Nebraska (10–1)	Nebraska (11–1)	Virginia Tech (11–1)	3.
4.	Penn State (8)	Florida (1–0)	Florida (2–0)	Michigan (3–0)	Michigan (4–0)	Nebraska (5–0)	Virginia Tech (5–0)	Virginia Tech (6–0)	Tennessee (5–1)	Tennessee (6–1)	Florida (8–1)	Nebraska (9–1)	Wisconsin (9–2)	Wisconsin (9–2)	Wisconsin (9–2)	Wisconsin (10–2)	4.
5.	Florida	Michigan (1–0)	Michigan (2–0)	Nebraska (3–0)	Nebraska (4–0)	Virginia Tech (4–0)	Tennessee (4–1)	Tennessee (4–1)	Florida (6–1)	Florida (7–1)	Kansas State (9–0)	Wisconsin (9–2)	Texas (9–2)	Florida (9–2)	Tennessee (9–2)	Michigan (10–2)	5.
6.	Nebraska	Nebraska (1–0)	Nebraska (2–0)	Texas A&M (2–0)	Texas A&M (3–0)	Tennessee (3–1)	Florida (5–1)	Florida (6–1)	Kansas State (7–0)	Kansas State (8–0)	Nebraska (8–1)	Texas (9–2)	Florida (9–2)	Tennessee (9–2)	Alabama (10–2)	Kansas State (11–1)	6.
7.	Michigan	Texas A&M (1–0)	Texas A&M (1–0)	Tennessee (1–1)	Virginia Tech (3–0)	Florida (4–1)	Michigan State (6–0)	Kansas State (6–0)	Georgia Tech (5–1)	Georgia Tech (6–1)	Mississippi State (8–0)	Tennessee (7–2)	Tennessee (8–2)	Kansas State (10–1)	Kansas State (10–1)	Michigan State (10–2)	7.
8.	Texas A&M	Wisconsin (1–0)	Wisconsin (2–0)	Virginia Tech (2–0)	Tennessee (2–1)	Georgia Tech (3–1)	Kansas State (5–0)	Georgia Tech (5–1)	Mississippi State (7–0)	Mississippi State (7–0)	Penn State (9–1)	Alabama (8–2)	Kansas State (10–1)	Alabama (9–2)	Michigan (9–2)	Alabama (10–3)	8.
9.	Ohio State	Miami (FL) (2–0)	Miami (FL) (2–0)	Georgia (2–0)	Ohio State (3–1)	Georgia (4–0)	Georgia Tech (4–1)	Michigan (5–1)	Nebraska (6–1)	Nebraska (7–1)	Wisconsin (8–2)	Kansas State (9–1)	Alabama (9–2)	Michigan (9–2)	Michigan State (9–2)	Tennessee (9–3)	9.
10.	Wisconsin	Georgia Tech (1–0)	Virginia Tech (2–0)	Ohio State (2–1)	Purdue (4–0)	Kansas State (4–0)	Michigan (5–1)	Texas A&M (5–1)	Georgia (6–1)	Wisconsin (7–2)	Texas (8–2)	Michigan (8–2)	Michigan (9–2)	Michigan State (9–2)	Florida (9–3)	Marshall (13–0)	10.
11.	Georgia Tech	Virginia Tech (1–0)	Georgia (2–0)	Purdue (3–0)	Georgia (3–0)	Michigan State (5–0)	Texas A&M (4–1)	Mississippi State (6–0)	Wisconsin (6–2)	Texas (7–2)	Marshall (9–0)	Marshall (10–0)	Michigan State (9–2)	Marshall (11–0)	Marshall (12–0)	Penn State (10–3)	11.
12.	Miami (FL)	Georgia (1–0)	Ohio State (1–1)	Georgia Tech (2–1)	Georgia Tech (2–1)	Texas A&M (3–1)	Mississippi State (6–0)	Alabama (5–1)	Texas (6–2)	Marshall (8–0)	BYU (8–1)	Georgia Tech (7–2)	Marshall (10–0)	Texas (9–3)	Minnesota (8–3)	Mississippi State (10–2)	12.
13.	Georgia	UCLA (1–0)	Georgia Tech (1–1)	Miami (FL) (2–1)	Kansas State (3–0)	Mississippi State (5–0)	Alabama (4–1)	Michigan State (6–1)	Marshall (7–0)	BYU (7–1)	Alabama (7–2)	Penn State (9–2)	Southern Miss (8–3)	Minnesota (8–3)	Texas A&M (8–3)	Southern Miss (9–3)	13.
14.	Virginia Tech	Ohio State (0–1)	Purdue (2–0)	Arkansas (2–0)	Michigan State (4–0)	Alabama (4–1)	Georgia (4–1)	Georgia (5–1)	Michigan (5–2)	Alabama (6–2)	Georgia Tech (6–2)	Michigan State (9–2)	Minnesota (8–3)	Texas A&M (8–3)	Southern Miss (8–3)	Florida (9–4)	14.
15.	UCLA	Arizona (1–1)	Arkansas (1–0)	Kansas State (2–0)	Texas (4–1)	Marshall (5–0) т	Syracuse (5–1)	Marshall (6–0)	BYU (6–1)	Michigan (6–2)	Michigan (7–2)	Mississippi State (8–1)	Penn State (9–3)	Southern Miss (8–3)	Georgia Tech (8–3)	Miami (FL) (9–4)	15.
16.	Texas	Purdue (1–0)	Kansas State (1–0)	USC (2–0)	Mississippi State (4–0)	Purdue (4–1) т	Marshall (5–0)	Wisconsin (5–2)	Alabama (5–2)	Georgia (6–2)	Georgia (6–2)	Ole Miss (7–2)	Georgia Tech (7–3)	Georgia Tech (8–3)	Mississippi State (9–2)	Georgia (8–4)	16.
17.	Colorado	Arkansas (1–0)	Arizona (2–1)	Wisconsin (2–1)	Marshall (4–0)	Syracuse (4–1)	Ohio State (4–2)	Purdue (5–2)	East Carolina (6–1)	East Carolina (7–1)	Michigan State (6–2)	Southern Miss (7–3)	Texas A&M (7–3)	Penn State (9–3)	Penn State (9–3)	Minnesota (8–4)	17.
18.	Notre Dame	Kansas State (0–0)	Alabama (2–0)	UCLA (1–1)	Arkansas (2–1)	East Carolina (5–0)	Wisconsin (4–2)	Texas (5–2)	Texas A&M (5–2)	Texas A&M (6–2)	Ole Miss (7–2)	Minnesota (7–3)	East Carolina (9–2)	Mississippi State (9–2)	Texas (9–4)	Oregon (9–3)	18.
19.	Kansas State	Virginia (1–0)	USC (1–0)	BYU (2–0)	Syracuse (3–1)	Ohio State (3–2)	Texas (5–2)	BYU (4–1)	Southern Miss (5–2)	Michigan State (6–2)	Miami (FL) (5–3)	BYU (8–2)	Mississippi State (8–2)	East Carolina (9–2)	East Carolina (9–2)	Arkansas (8–4)	19.
20.	Alabama	USC (1–0)	NC State (3–0)	Texas (3–1)	Miami (FL) (2–2)	Wisconsin (3–2)	BYU (4–1)	East Carolina (5–1)	Michigan State (6–2)	Ohio State (6–3)	Southern Miss (6–3)	Texas A&M (7–3)	Boston College (8–2)	Purdue (7–4)	Purdue (7–4)	Texas A&M (8–4)	20.
21.	USC	Notre Dame (1–1)	UCLA (1–1)	Michigan State (3–0)	East Carolina (4–0)	Miami (FL) (2–2)	Purdue (4–2)	Southern Miss (4–2)	Ohio State (5–3)	Purdue (5–3)	Minnesota (6–3)	East Carolina (8–2)	Georgia (6–3)	Stanford (8–3)	Stanford (8–3)	Georgia Tech (8–4)	21.
22.	Arkansas	Alabama (1–0)	Texas (2–1)	Marshall (3–0)	Alabama (3–1)	USC (3–1)	Ole Miss (5–1)	Ohio State (4–3)	Purdue (5–3)	Miami (FL) (4–3)	Washington (6–3)	Boston College (7–2)	Arkansas (7–3)	Boston College (8–3)	Boston College (8–3)	Ole Miss (8–4)	22.
23.	Purdue	Texas (1–1)	Arizona State (1–0)	Mississippi State (3–0)	USC (2–1)	Texas (4–2)	East Carolina (5–1)	Miami (FL) (2–3)	Miami (FL) (3–3)	Ole Miss (6–2)	Texas A&M (6–3)	Georgia (6–3)	Purdue (7–4)	Georgia (7–4)	Miami (FL) (8–4)	Texas (9–5)	23.
24.	Virginia	NC State (2–0)	Colorado State (2–0)	NC State (3–1)	Virginia (3–1)	BYU (3–1)	Miami (FL) (2–3)	Syracuse (5–2)	Syracuse (5–2)	Arkansas (5–2)	East Carolina (7–2)	Arkansas (6–3)	Ole Miss (7–3)	Miami (FL) (7–4)	Georgia (7–4)	Stanford (8–4)	24.
25.	Arizona State	Arizona State (1–0)	Marshall (2–0)	Air Force (2–0)	Oklahoma (3–0)	Ole Miss (4–1)	Air Force (4–1)	Minnesota (5–1)	Stanford (5–2)	Southern Miss (5–3)	Boston College (6–2)	Purdue (6–4)	Stanford (7–3)	BYU (8–3)	BYU (8–3)	Illinois (8–4)	25.
	Preseason Aug 6	Week 2 Sep 7	Week 3 Sep 13	Week 4 Sep 20	Week 5 Sep 27	Week 6 Oct 4	Week 7 Oct 11	Week 8 Oct 18	Week 9 October 25	Week 10 Nov 1	Week 11 Nov 8	Week 12 Nov 15	Week 13 Nov 22	Week 14 Nov 29	Week 15 Dec 6	Week 16 (Final) Jan 6	
		Dropped: Colorado	Dropped: Virginia; Notre Dame	Dropped: Arizona; Alabama; Arizona State; Colorado State	Dropped: Wisconsin; UCLA; BYU; NC State; Air Force	Dropped: Arkansas; Virginia; Oklahoma	Dropped: USC	Dropped: Ole Miss; Air Force	Dropped: Minnesota	Dropped: Syracuse; Stanford	Dropped: Ohio State; Purdue; Arkansas	Dropped: Miami (FL); Washington	Dropped: BYU	Dropped: Arkansas; Ole Miss	None	Dropped: East Carolina; Purdue; Boston College; BYU	

== BCS standings ==
The Bowl Championship Series (BCS) determined the two teams that competed in the BCS National Championship Game, the 2000 Sugar Bowl.

	Week 9 Oct 25	Week 10 Nov 1	Week 11 Nov 8	Week 12 Nov 15	Week 13 Nov 22	Week 14 Nov 29	Week 15 (Final) Dec 5	
1.	Florida State (8–0)	Florida State (9–0)	Florida State (9–0)	Florida State (10–0)	Florida State (11–0)	Florida State (11–0)	Florida State (11–0)	1.
2.	Penn State (8–0)	Penn State (9–0)	Tennessee (7–1)	Virginia Tech (9–0)	Virginia Tech (10–0)	Virginia Tech (11–0)	Virginia Tech (11–0)	2.
3.	Virginia Tech (6–0)	Virginia Tech (7–0)	Virginia Tech (8–0)	Nebraska (9–1)	Nebraska (9–1)	Nebraska (10–1)	Nebraska (11–1)	3.
4.	Tennessee (5–1)	Florida (7–1)	Florida (8–1)	Florida (9–1)	Tennessee (8–2)	Florida (9–2)	Alabama (10–2)	4.
5.	Kansas State (7–0)	Tennessee (6–1)	Kansas State (9–0)	Tennessee (7–2)	Florida (9–2)	Tennessee (9–2)	Tennessee (9–2)	5.
6.	Florida (6–1)	Kansas State (8–0)	Nebraska (8–1)	Alabama (8–2)	Kansas State (10–1)	Kansas State (10–1)	Kansas State (10–1)	6.
7.	Nebraska (6–1)	Georgia Tech (6–1)	Penn State (9–1)	Wisconsin (9–2)	Wisconsin (9–2)	Alabama (9–2)	Wisconsin (9–2)	7.
8.	Georgia Tech (5–1)	Nebraska (7–1)	Wisconsin (8–2)	Kansas State (9–1)	Alabama (9–2)	Wisconsin (9–2)	Michigan (9–2)	8.
9.	Wisconsin (6–2)	Alabama (6–2)	Alabama (7–2)	Texas (9–2)	Texas (9–2)	Michigan (9–2)	Michigan State (9–2)	9.
10.	Texas (6–2)	Wisconsin (7–2)	Mississippi St. (8–0)	Michigan (8–2)	Michigan (9–2)	Michigan State (9–2)	Florida (9–3)	10.
11.	Mississippi St. (7–0)	Texas (7–2)	Texas (8–2)	Penn State (9–2)	Michigan State (9–2)	Texas (9–3)	Penn State (9–3)	11.
12.	Michigan (5–2)	Mississippi St. (7–0)	Michigan (8–2)	Michigan State (8–2)	Penn State (9–3)	Marshall (11–0)	Marshall (12–0)	12.
13.	Alabama (5–2)	Michigan (6–2)	Michigan State (7–2)	Georgia Tech (7–2)	Marshall (10–0)	Penn State (9–3)	Minnesota (8–3)	13.
14.	Marshall (7–0)	Marshall (8–0)	BYU (8–1)	Marshall (10–0)	Minnesota (8–3)	Minnesota (8–3)	Texas A&M (8–3)	14.
15.	Michigan State (6–2)	BYU (7–1)	Georgia Tech (6–2)	Mississippi St. (8–1)	Southern Miss (8–3)	Texas A&M (8–3)	Texas (9–4)	15.
	Week 9 Oct 25	Week 10 Nov 1	Week 11 Nov 8	Week 12 Nov 15	Week 13 Nov 22	Week 14 Nov 29	Week 15 (Final) Dec 5	
		Dropped: Michigan State	Dropped: Marshall	Dropped: BYU	Dropped: Georgia Tech; Mississippi St.	Dropped: Southern Miss	Dropped: None	
