= Brooks Barnard =

American football player (born 1979)

No. 8
- Position: Punter

Personal information
- Born: November 4, 1979 (age 47); Arnold, Maryland, U.S.
- Listed height: 6 ft 2 in (1.88 m)
- Listed weight: 192 lb (87 kg)

Career information
- College: Maryland
- NFL draft: 2003: undrafted

Career history
- New England Patriots (2003); Chicago Bears (2003); Rhein Fire (2004); Green Bay Packers (2005)*
- * Offseason or practice squad member only

Awards and highlights
- Second-team All-American (2001); Third-team Freshman All-American (1999); 2× First-team All-ACC (2001, 2002)

Career NFL statistics
- Punts: 10
- Yards: 365
- Long: 49
- Inside 20: 4
- Touchbacks: 1
- Stats at Pro Football Reference

Brooks Alexander Barnard (born November 4, 1979) is an American football punter. He played professional football for the New England Patriots in the National Football League (NFL) and for the Rhein Fire in the NFL Europe. He played college football for the Maryland Terrapins at the University of Maryland.

== Early life ==
Brooks Barnard was born to parents John and Karen Barnard on November 4, 1979, in Arnold, Maryland. Former Baltimore Orioles third baseman Brooks Robinson was his namesake. Barnard attended Broadneck High School where he was a four-year letterwinner on the football team and set every school record for both kicking and punting. He recorded 18 field goals during his high school career. As a senior in 1997, he averaged 42.4 yards per punt and made 96 of 99 extra point attempts. Barnard received all-state honors during his junior and senior seasons. He was a member of the Fellowship of Christian Athletes.

== College career ==
Barnard attended the University of Oklahoma for the fall semester of 1998, but then transferred to the University of Maryland, College Park, where he majored in kinesiology. He walked onto the football team and entered the 1999 season as the back-up punter and as a holder. He saw action in eight games including seven starts. Barnard recorded 39 punts for 1,687 yards including ten inside the opponents' 20-yard line and 11 of 50 yards or longer. He averaged 43.3 yards per punt, which was a school best since 1993, all-time third-best, and all-time best for a freshman player. After his first game action against Georgia Tech, he won the starting position for the Wake Forest game. The Sporting News named him a third-team freshman All-American.

In 2000, he started in all 11 games. He set a school record of 44.7 yards per punt, which surpassed Scott Milanovich's 43.8-yard average in 1993. He compiled 13 punts of 50 yards or longer, including a career-long 85-yarder against Temple, and 71-, 67-, 67-, 66-, 63-, and 61-yard punts, and eight inside the opponents' 20-yard line. In mid-October, he was the second-ranked punter in the nation, with an average of 46.0 yards per punt. He was included on the watch list for the Ray Guy Award for college football's most outstanding punter. Barnard was named an honorable mention All-ACC player and College Football News honorable mention All-American.

Barnard started all 12 games in 2001. Barnard was the seventh-ranked punter in that nation with an average of 44.5 yards per punt. Against North Carolina, he punted eight times for an average of 50.4 yards, with seven of eight going for more than 50 yards, and was named the ACC Specialist of the Week. Against Georgia Tech, he correctly brought down a high snap for the game-tying field goal that allowed a Maryland overtime victory. He was named a College Football News second-team All-American, a first-team All-ACC, and Academic All-ACC player. Barnard was also a Ray Guy Award semifinalist.

In 2002, he recorded 55 punts for 2,373 yards, five touchbacks, 13 inside the opponents' 20-yard line, and a long of 60 yards. Barnard finished his time at Maryland as the school career-leader in punting average. He was named to a first-team All-ACC, Academic All-ACC team, an honorable mention ECAC All-Star player. He participated in the 2003 Senior Bowl as both a punter and kicker.

== Professional career ==
In 2003, Barnard was signed as an undrafted free agent by the Chicago Bears on April 29 and then released on August 25. He was then signed as a free agent by the New England Patriots, and during the 2003 season, played in one game and kicked ten punts for 365 yards, including one touchback and four inside the opponents' 20-yard line. He was released by the Patriots in December. On December 16, 2003, the Bears claimed Barnard from the Patriots' waiver and extended his contract on December 30. The Bears released him in September 2004. In 2004, Chicago allocated him to the Rhein Fire of the NFL Europe. In 2005, he was signed by the Green Bay Packers on January 19, and waived on July 19, 2005.
