= 1999 Virginia Cavaliers football team =

American college football season

1999 Virginia Cavaliers football

MicronPC.com Bowl, L 21–63 vs. Illinois
- Conference: Atlantic Coast Conference
- Record: 7–5 (5–3 ACC)
- Head coach: George Welsh (18th season)
- Offensive coordinator: Gary Tranquill (5th season)
- Defensive coordinator: Rick Lantz (9th season)
- Captains: Travis Griffith; Thomas Jones; Noel LaMontagne; Byron Thweatt
- Home stadium: Scott Stadium

1999 Atlantic Coast Conference football standings
	Conf.			Overall
Team	W		L	W		L
No. 1 Florida State $#	8	–	0	12	–	0
No. 17 Georgia Tech	5	–	3	8	–	4
Virginia	5	–	3	7	–	5
Clemson	5	–	3	6	–	6
Wake Forest	3	–	5	7	–	5
NC State	3	–	5	6	–	6
Duke	3	–	5	3	–	8
Maryland	2	–	6	5	–	6
North Carolina	2	–	6	3	–	8
# – BCS National Champion; $ – BCS representative as conference champion; Rankings from AP Poll

The 1999 Virginia Cavaliers football team represented the University of Virginia as a member of the Atlantic Coast Conference (ACC) during the 1999 NCAA Division I-A football season. Led by 18th-year head coach George Welsh, the Cavaliers compiled an overall record of 7–5 with a mark of 5–3 in conference play, placing in a three-way tie for second in the ACC. Virginia was invited to the MicronPC.com Bowl, where the Cavaliers lost to Illinois. The team played home games at Scott Stadium in Charlottesville, Virginia.

== Schedule ==
Date	Time	Opponent	Rank	Site	TV	Result	Attendance	Source
September 4	12:00 pm	at North Carolina	No. 23	Kenan Memorial Stadium; Chapel Hill, NC (South's Oldest Rivalry)	ABC	W 20–17	59,000	
September 11	3:30 pm	at Clemson	No. 22	Memorial Stadium; Clemson, SC	ABC	L 14–33	66,922	
September 18	7:00 pm	Wake Forest		Scott Stadium; Charlottesville, VA	ESPN2	W 35–7	50,000	
September 25	9:00 pm	at No. 17 BYU*		Cougar Stadium; Provo, UT	ESPN2	W 45–40	65,453	
October 2	6:00 pm	No. 8 Virginia Tech*	No. 24	Scott Stadium; Charlottesville, VA (rivalry)	ESPN2	L 7–31	51,800	
October 9	1:00 pm	Duke^{†}		Scott Stadium; Charlottesville, VA		L 17–24 ^{2OT}	43,600	
October 16	3:30 pm	at NC State		Carter–Finley Stadium; Raleigh, NC	ABC	W 47–26	49,507	
October 30	7:00 pm	No. 1 Florida State		Scott Stadium; Charlottesville, VA (Jefferson–Eppes Trophy)	ESPN	L 10–35	47,900	
November 6	3:30 pm	No. 7 Georgia Tech		Scott Stadium; Charlottesville, VA	ABC	W 45–38	44,500	
November 13	1:00 pm	Buffalo*		Scott Stadium; Charlottesville, VA		W 50–21	40,100	
November 20	12:00 pm	at Maryland		Byrd Stadium; College Park, MD (rivalry)	JPS	W 34–30	32,334	
December 30	6:00 pm	vs. Illinois*		Pro Player Stadium; Miami Gardens, FL (MicronPC.com Bowl)	TBS	L 21–63	31,089	
*Non-conference game; ^{†}Homecoming; Rankings from AP Poll released prior to the game; All times are in Eastern time

== Rankings ==
Ranking movements Legend: ██ Increase in ranking ██ Decrease in ranking — = Not ranked
	Week																
Poll	Pre	1	2	3	4	5	6	7	8	9	10	11	12	13	14	15	Final
AP	24	23	22	—	—	24	—	—	—	—	—	—	—	—	—	—	—
Coaches	—	—*	19	—	—	24	—	—	—	—	—	—	—	—	—	—	—
BCS	Not released									—	—	—	—	—	—	—	Not released

== Roster ==
1999 Virginia Cavaliers football team roster
Players
Coaches
Offense

Pos.	#	Name	Class
QB	3	Bryson Spinner	Fr
RB	6	Thomas Jones	Sr
QB	17	Dan Ellis	Jr
RB	23	Arlen Harris	Fr
FB	41	Patrick Washington	Jr
C	50	John St. Clair	Sr
OT	60	Drew Nelson	Fr
G	77	Noel LaMontagne	Sr
TE	81	Chris Luzar	So
TE	86	Casey Crawford	Sr
TE	87	Billy Baber	Jr

Defense

Pos.	#	Name	Class
LB	9	Shannon Taylor	Sr
DB	26	Antwan Harris	Sr
LB	32	Byron Thweatt	Jr
LB	33	Donny Green	Jr
LB	39	Angelo Crowell	Fr
DT	98	Monsanto Pope	So

Special teams

Pos.	#	Name	Class

Head coach

- George Welsh

Coordinators/assistant coaches

- Paul Schudel – Offensive line

Legend

- (C) Team captain
- (S) Suspended
- (I) Ineligible
- Injured
- Redshirt

Roster
