= 1999 Florida State Seminoles football team =

American college football season

1999 Florida State Seminoles football

Consensus national champion ACC champion Sugar Bowl champion

Sugar Bowl (BCS NCG), W 46–29 vs. Virginia Tech
- Conference: Atlantic Coast Conference

Ranking
- Coaches: No. 1
- AP: No. 1
- Record: 12–0 (8–0 ACC)
- Head coach: Bobby Bowden (24th season)
- Offensive coordinator: Mark Richt (6th season)
- Offensive scheme: Pro-style
- Defensive coordinator: Mickey Andrews (16th season)
- Base defense: 4–3
- Captains: Corey Simon; Todd Frier; Peter Warrick
- Home stadium: Doak Campbell Stadium

1999 Atlantic Coast Conference football standings
	Conf.			Overall
Team	W		L	W		L
No. 1 Florida State $#	8	–	0	12	–	0
No. 17 Georgia Tech	5	–	3	8	–	4
Virginia	5	–	3	7	–	5
Clemson	5	–	3	6	–	6
Wake Forest	3	–	5	7	–	5
NC State	3	–	5	6	–	6
Duke	3	–	5	3	–	8
Maryland	2	–	6	5	–	6
North Carolina	2	–	6	3	–	8
# – BCS National Champion; $ – BCS representative as conference champion; Rankings from AP Poll

The 1999 Florida State Seminoles football team represented the Florida State University as a member of the Atlantic Coast Conference (ACC) during the 1999 NCAA Division I-A football season. Led by 24th-year head coach Bobby Bowden, the Seminoles compiled an overall record of 12–0 with a mark of 8–0 in conference play, winning the ACC title. Florida State was invited to the Sugar Bowl, the BCS National Championship Game, where they defeated Virginia Tech to capture the program's second consensus College football national championship. The team played home games at Doak Campbell Stadium in Tallahassee, Florida.

Florida State entered the season with high expectations after losing to Tennessee in the inaugural BCS Championship game. The Seminoles were ranked No. 1 in all national preseason polls, picked unanimously to win the ACC and expected to contend for a national championship. The Seminoles finished 11–2 in 1998, extending their NCAA record to 13 straight seasons with at least 10 victories and ranked among the nation's top four teams.

The Seminoles were first team in NCAA history to go "wire-to-wire" ranked continuously as the nation's No. 1 team from the preseason through the bowl season. This marked the 13th consecutive season that the Seminoles finished in the top 5 of both the AP and Coaches poll. 1999 was also the 17th consecutive season in which Bowden led the Seminoles to a bowl game.

== Schedule ==
Date	Time	Opponent	Rank	Site	TV	Result	Attendance	Source
August 28	5:00 p.m.	Louisiana Tech*	No. 1	Doak Campbell Stadium; Tallahassee, FL	ESPN2	W 41–7	72,702	
September 11	8:00 p.m.	No. 10 Georgia Tech	No. 1	Doak Campbell Stadium; Tallahassee, FL	ABC	W 41–35	80,187	
September 18	3:30 p.m.	No. 20 NC State	No. 1	Doak Campbell Stadium; Tallahassee, FL	ABC	W 42–11	80,040	
September 25	3:30 p.m.	at North Carolina	No. 1	Kenan Memorial Stadium; Chapel Hill, NC	ABC	W 42–10	60,000	
October 2	12:00 p.m.	vs. Duke	No. 1	Alltel Stadium; Jacksonville, FL	JP	W 51–23	37,310	
October 9	12:00 p.m.	No. 19 Miami (FL)*	No. 1	Doak Campbell Stadium; Tallahassee, FL (rivalry)	ABC	W 31–21	80,976	
October 16	7:00 p.m.	Wake Forest	No. 1	Doak Campbell Stadium; Tallahassee, FL	PPV	W 33–10	78,105	
October 23	7:00 p.m.	at Clemson	No. 1	Memorial Stadium; Clemson, SC (rivalry)	ESPN	W 17–14	86,092	
October 30	7:00 p.m.	at Virginia	No. 1	Scott Stadium; Charlettesville, VA (Jefferson–Eppes Trophy)	ESPN	W 35–10	47,900	
November 13	3:30 p.m.	Maryland	No. 1	Doak Campbell Stadium; Tallahassee, FL	ABC	W 49–10	80,340	
November 20	3:30 p.m.	at No. 3 Florida*	No. 1	Ben Hill Griffin Stadium; Gainesville, FL (rivalry, College GameDay)	CBS	W 30–23	85,747	
January 4	8:00 p.m.	vs. No. 2 Virginia Tech*	No. 1	Louisiana Superdome; New Orleans, LA (Sugar Bowl, College GameDay)	ABC	W 46–29	79,280	
*Non-conference game; Rankings from AP Poll released prior to the game; All times are in Eastern time

== Rankings ==
Ranking movements Legend: ( ) = First-place votes
	Week																
Poll	Pre	1	2	3	4	5	6	7	8	9	10	11	12	13	14	15	Final
AP	1 (48)	1 (28)	1 (31)	1 (49)	1 (59)	1 (61)	1 (64)	1 (63)	1 (62)	1 (55)	1 (55)	1 (66)	1 (63)	1 (66)	1 (66)	1 (64)	1 (70)
Coaches	1 (36)	1*	1 (29)	1 (44)	1 (50)	1 (52)	1 (53)	1 (53)	1 (52)	1 (41)	1 (44)	1 (57)	1 (58)	1 (57)	1 (56)	1 (56)	1 (59)
BCS	Not released									1	1	1	1	1	1	1	Not released

== Before the season ==
On November 12, 1998, quarterback Chris Weinke underwent surgery at Tallahassee Memorial Hospital to repair damage to his C6 vertebrae. The surgery repaired ligament damage, corrected a ruptured disc and removed a bone chip which was lodged against a nerve in his neck. There was much uncertainty as to whether or not Weinke would be fully healthy for the 1999 season as there was a six-month recovery period and much weight loss.

=== Preseason outlook ===
The Seminoles ended the 1998 season with a defeat in the inaugural BCS Championship game to Tennessee and finished with a No. 3 ranking in both the AP and Coaches polls and winning their seventh consecutive ACC title. Bowden had two returning Consensus All-Americans and two other All-Americans among his 16 starters along with 19 fifth-year seniors. "This time a year ago, I said we had a talented football team, but it's the least experience we've had in a long time", Bowden said. "Now we've got most of the same guys back. Most of those guys started. That's the reason for so much preseason optimism." As expected, FSU was at the top of the first Coaches Poll of the season, released August 5, 1999 with 36 of a possible 59 first-place votes; other teams receiving first-place votes were No.2 Tennessee with 13 votes, No. 3 Arizona with 2 votes, and No. 4 Penn State with 8 votes. FSU was also atop the AP poll, released August 14, 1999 with 48 of a possible 70 first-place votes; other teams receiving first-place votes were No. 2 Tennessee with 15 votes, No. 3 Penn State with 4 votes, No. 4 Arizona, No. 5 Florida, and No. 13 Virginia Tech with 1 vote each. Seminoles came into pre-season camp with a healthy Chris Weinke who had to miss the 1999 Fiesta Bowl BCS National championship game due to a season-ending cervical herniated disc sustained during a sack against Virginia.

Despite being a top NFL draft pick, Peter Warrick stated his desire to earn his undergraduate degree and to win a national championship after the Seminoles lost the 1999 Fiesta Bowl BCS National Championship game. Warrick would begin the 1999 season as a preseason Heisman front runner alongside Drew Brees, Ron Dayne, and Joe Hamilton. Warrick was considered the front-runner for the Fred Biletnikoff award for the nation's top wide receiver. The Weinke led offense that scored 31 points a game in 1998 would find himself with a corp of wide receivers with Warrick, Laveranues Coles, and Ron Dugans.

=== Recruiting class ===
Due to FSU having 74 scholarship players on the roster and the maximum per NCAA is 85, FSU signed 13 players on National Signing Day. The recruiting class included four players named to USA Today's All-USA high school football team: Nick Maddox (RB), Kendyll Pope (LB), Darnell Dockett (DL), and Anquan Boldin (QB) who chose FSU over Florida and Miami. During preseason practice, Anquan Boldin moved from quarterback to wide receiver at his request. Coach Bobby Bowden stated "I told him he'd be a great quarterback, (His decision) surprised all of us. He is an excellent prospect wherever he lines up."

The recruiting class of 13

Name	Position	Hometown	High School	Height	Weight
Anquan Boldin	QB	Pahokee, Florida	Pahokee HS	6 ft 2 in (188 cm)	205 lb (93 kg)
Rufus Brown	DB	El Paso, Texas	Austin HS	5 ft 10 in (178 cm)	185 lb (84 kg)
Cornelius Collier	LB	Miami, Florida	Palmetto HS	6 ft 1 in (185 cm)	220 lb (100 kg)
Darnell Dockett	DL	Burtonsville, Maryland	Paint Branch HS	6 ft 4 in (193 cm)	260 lb (120 kg)
Kevin Emanuel	DL	Waco, Texas	Waco HS	6 ft 4 in (193 cm)	240 lb (110 kg)
Randy Golightly	FB/LB	Tallahassee, Florida	North Florida Christian	6 ft 2 in (188 cm)	237 lb (108 kg)
Alonzo Jackson	DL	Americus, Georgia	Americus HS	6 ft 4 in (193 cm)	245 lb (111 kg)
Nick Maddox	RB	Kannapolis, North Carolina	A.L. Brown HS	6 ft 0 in (183 cm)	190 lb (86 kg)
Kendyll Pope	LB	Lake City, Florida	Columbia HS	6 ft 2 in (188 cm)	212 lb (96 kg)
Fabian Walker	QB	Americus, Georgia	Americus HS	6 ft 2 in (188 cm)	205 lb (93 kg)
B.J. Ward	DB	Dallas, Texas	Kimball HS	6 ft 4 in (193 cm)	200 lb (91 kg)
Corey Whitaker	OL	Pace, Florida	Pace HS	6 ft 4 in (193 cm)	290 lb (130 kg)
Jeff Womble	DL	Dunwoody, Georgia	Dunwoody HS	6 ft 3 in (191 cm)	295 lb (134 kg)

== Game summaries ==
=== Louisiana Tech ===
	1	2	3	4	Total
Bulldogs	0	7	0	0	7
No. 1 Seminoles	7	7	17	10	41

=== Georgia Tech ===
	1	2	3	4	Total
No. 10 Yellow Jackets	7	14	7	7	35
No. 1 Seminoles	7	21	10	3	41

=== N.C. State ===
	1	2	3	4	Total
No. 20 Wolfpack	3	0	8	0	11
No. 1 Seminoles	3	15	14	10	42

=== North Carolina ===
	1	2	3	4	Total
No. 1 Seminoles	28	7	7	0	42
Tar Heels	0	3	7	0	10

=== Duke ===
	1	2	3	4	Total
Blue Devils	0	0	13	10	23
No. 1 Seminoles	21	23	0	7	51

=== Miami (FL) ===
	1	2	3	4	Total
No. 19 Hurricanes	14	7	0	0	21
No. 1 Seminoles	14	7	3	7	31

=== Wake Forest ===
	1	2	3	4	Total
Demon Deacons	3	0	0	7	10
No. 1 Seminoles	6	3	14	10	33

=== Clemson ===
	1	2	3	4	Total
No. 1 Seminoles	3	0	11	3	17
Tigers	0	14	0	0	14

=== Virginia ===
	1	2	3	4	Total
No. 1 Seminoles	0	7	14	14	35
Cavaliers	0	10	0	0	10

=== Maryland ===
	1	2	3	4	Total
Terrapins	0	3	0	7	10
No. 1 Seminoles	7	21	14	7	49

=== Florida ===
	1	2	3	4	Total
No. 1 Seminoles	7	6	10	7	30
No. 3 Gators	0	6	10	7	23

=== Virginia Tech—Sugar Bowl ===
Virginia Tech vs. Florida State

Team	1	2	3	4	Total
No. 2 Virginia Tech	7	7	15	0	29
• No. 1 Florida State	14	14	0	18	46

- Date: January 4, 2000
- Location:
  Louisiana Superdome
  New Orleans
- Game attendance: 79,280
- Referee: Steve Shaw
- TV announcers (ABC): Brent Musburger, Gary Danielson

Scoring summary
Q1	3:22	FSU	Warrick 64-yard pass from Weinke (Janikowski kick)	FSU 7–0
Q1	2:14	FSU	Chaney 6-yard blocked punt return (Janikowski kick)	FSU 14–0
Q1	0:30	VT	André Davis 49-yard pass from Michael Vick (Shayne Graham kick)	FSU 14–7
Q2	13:45	FSU	Dugans 63-yard pass from Weinke (Janikowski kick)	FSU 21–7
Q2	11:40	FSU	Warrick 59-yard punt return (Janikowski kick)	FSU 28–7
Q2	0:37	VT	Michael Vick 3-yard run (Shayne Graham kick)	FSU 28–14
Q3	7:54	VT	Shayne Graham 23-yard field goal	FSU 28–17
Q3	5:57	VT	Andre Kendrick 29-yard run (2-point pass failed)	FSU 28–23
Q3	2:13	VT	Andre Kendrick 6-yard run (2-point pass failed)	VT 29–28
Q4	12:59	FSU	Dugans 14-yard pass from Weinke (Warrick pass from Weinke)	FSU 36–29
Q4	10:26	FSU	Janikowski 32-yard field goal	FSU 39–29
Q4	7:42	FSU	Warrick 43-yard pass from Chris Weinke (Janikowski kick)	FSU 46–29

== Personnel ==
=== Coaching staff ===
Name	Position	Seasons at Florida State	Alma mater
Bobby Bowden	Head coach	24	Howard College (1953)
Chuck Amato	Assistant Head Coach, Linebackers	19	NC State (1968)
Mickey Andrews	Defensive coordinator, Defensive backs	16	Alabama (1964)
Jeff Bowden	Receivers	6	Florida State (1983)
Chris Demarest	Graduate assistant, Defensive backs	1	Northeastern (1988)
Steve Gabbard	Graduate assistant	2	Florida State (1988)
Jim Gladden	Assistant Head Coach, Defensive Ends	25	William Jewell College (1962)
Odell Haggins	Defensive Line	6	Florida State (1993)
Jimmy Heggins	Assistant Head Coach, Offensive Line	14	Florida State (1978)
John Lilly	Tight Ends, Recruiting Coordinator	4	Guilford College (1990)
Mark Richt	Offensive Coordinator, Quarterbacks	10	Miami (1982)
Billy Sexton	Running Backs	22	Florida State (1974)
Dave Van Halanger	Strength and Conditioning	17	West Virginia (1976)
'Reference:

=== Roster ===
1999 Florida State Seminoles roster
Quarterbacks: 6 Anquan Boldin – freshman; 10 Rich Maher – junior; 11 Jared Jones – sophomore; 14 Marcus Outzen – (redshirt) junior; 16 Chris Weinke – junior; Running backs: 20 Raymont Skaggs – senior; 20 Nick Maddox – freshman; 22 Davy Ford – (redshirt) sophomore; 23 Travis Minor – junior; 24 Jeff Chaney – junior; Fullback: 10 Dan Kendra – (redshirt) senior; 36 William McCray – junior; 39 Chad Maeder – (redshirt) sophomore; 43 Randy Golightly – freshman; Wide receivers: 7 Laveranues Coles – senior; 9 Peter Warrick – (redshirt) senior; 13 Marvin Minnis – (redshirt) junior; 19 Greg Moore – (redshirt) freshman; 21 Talman Gardner – (redshirt) freshman; 26 Atrews Bell – (redshirt) sophomore; 80 Ron Dugans – (redshirt) senior; 83 Jarret Gardner – (redshirt) junior; 84 Gennaro Jackson – junior; 86 Germaine Stringer – (redshirt) senior; 87 Robert Morgan – sophomore; Tight ends: 81 Nick Franklin – senior; 82 Patrick Hughes – sophomore; 85 Ryan Sprague – (redshirt) junior; 88 Carver Donaldson – (redshirt) sophomore	Offensive line: 51 Ronald Boldin – junior; 52 Antoine Mirambeau – (redshirt) freshman; 54 Jarad Moon – (redshirt) junior; 57 Eric Thomas – (redshirt) senior; 60 Tarlos Thomas – (redshirt) junior; 61 Montrae Holland – (redshirt) freshman; 64 Justin Amman – (redshirt) junior; 67 Josh Baggs – (redshirt) sophomore; 68 Jason Whitaker – (redshirt) senior; 70 Corey Whitaker – freshman; 71 Jerry Carmichael – (redshirt) junior; 72 Brett Williams – (redshirt) freshman; 74 Otis Duhart – sophomore; 75 Char-ron Dorsey – junior; 76 Ross Brannon – (redshirt) junior; 77 Jeremy Brett – (redshirt) senior; 78 Donald Heaven – (redshirt) junior; 79 Todd Williams – (redshirt) freshman; Defensive line: 45 Darnell Dockett – freshman; 53 Corey Simon – (redshirt) senior; 56 Roland Seymour – (redshirt) junior; 58 Jamal Reynolds – junior; 69 WD Rodeffer – junior; 89 Alonzo Jackson – freshman; 90 Kevin Emanual – freshman; 91 Jeff Womble – freshman; 92 Jerry Johnson – (redshirt) senior; 93 Chris Walker – (redshirt) senior; 94 Octavis Jackson – (redshirt) freshman; 95 Rian Cason – (redshirt) freshman; 96 Randy Wilkins – (redshirt) junior; 97 Tony Benford – (redshirt) freshman; 98 Chris Woods – (redshirt) freshman; 99 David Warren – junior	Linebackers: 5 Theon Rackley – (redshirt) senior; 5 Cornelius Collier – freshman; 29 Tommy Polley – (redshirt) junior; 32 James Lewis – (redshirt) freshman; 42 Jerel Hudson – (redshirt) freshman; 44 Bradley Jennings – (redshirt) sophomore; 46 Michael Hamilton – (redshirt) freshman; 49 Bobby Rhodes – (redshirt) senior; 55 Brian Allen – (redshirt) junior; Defensive backs: 1 Reggie Durden – senior; 3 Malcolm Tatum – (redshirt) freshman; 6 Derrick Gibson – junior; 7 Rufus Brown – freshman; 8 Clevan Thomas – junior; 12 Abdual Howard – (redshirt) sophomore; 15 Mario Edwards – (redshirt) senior; 18 Sean Key – (redshirt) senior; 27 Tay Cody – (redshirt) junior; 28 Chris Hope – sophomore; 28 BJ Ward – freshman; 30 Stanford Samuels – (redshirt) freshman; 32 Jean Jeune – (redshirt) junior; 35 Todd Frier – (redshirt) senior; Punters: 47 Keith Cottrell – junior; 37 Chance Gwaltney – (redshirt) freshman; Kickers: 38 Sebastian Janikowski – junior; Long snapper: 73 Clay Ingram – senior

=== Depth chart ===
Defense

FS
Sean Key
Reggie Durden
B.J. Ward

MIKE	WILL	SAM
Tommy Polley	Bradley Jennings	Brian Allen
Bobby Rhodes	Jerel Hudson	Theon Rackley
Michael Hamilton	James Lewis	Cornelius Collier

ROVER
Derrick Gibson
Abdual Howard
⋅

CB
Mario Edwards
Rufus Brown
Malcolm Tatum

DE	DT	DT	DE
Jamal Reynolds	Corey Simon	Jerry Johnson	Roland Seymour
Randy Wilkins	Darnell Dockett	Chris Woods	Alonzo Jackson
O.J. Jackson	David Warren	Rian Cason	Chris Walker

CB
Tay Cody
Stanford Samuels
Chris Hope

Offense

WR
Peter Warrick
Robert Morgan
Jarret Gardner

LT	LG	C	RG	RT
Brett Williams	Jason Whitaker	Eric Thomas	Justin Amman	Tarlos Thomas
Donald Heaven	Otis Duhart	Antoine Mirambeau	Ronald Boldin	Todd Williams
Char-ron Dorsey	Corey Whitaker	Josh Baggs	Jerry Carmichael	Ross Brannon

TE
Ryan Sprague
Carver Donaldson
Nick Franklin
Patrick Hughes

WR
Marvin Minnis
Talman Gardner
Gennaro Jackson

QB
Chris Weinke
Marcus Outzen
Jared Jones

RB
Travis Minor
Jeff Chaney
Lemar Parrish
Davy Ford

FB
William McCray
Randy Golightly
Chad Maeder

Special teams
PK Sebastian Janikowski
P Keith Cottrell

== Awards and honors ==
- Lou Groza Award – Sebastian Janikowski, K

== Statistics ==
- QB Chris Weinke: 232/377 (61.5%) for 3,103 yards (8.23) with 25 TD vs. 14 INT (3.71%).
- RB Travis Minor: 180 carries for 815 yards (4.53) with 7 TD. 16 catches for 102 yards and 0 TD.
- WR Peter Warrick: 71 catches for 934 yards (13.15) with 8 TD. 16 carries for 96 yards (6.00) and 3 TD.
- WR Ron Dugans: 43 catches for 644 yards (14.98) with 3 TD.
- WR Marvin Minnis: 19 catches for 257 yards (13.53) with 3 TD.
- WR Laveranues Coles: 12 catches for 179 yards (14.92) with 1 TD.
- WR Anquan Boldin: 12 catches for 115 yards (9.58) with 2 TD. 4 carries for 33 yards (8.25) and 0 TD.
- K Sebastian Janikowski: 23 FGM and 47 XPM.
- P Austin Haywood: 1 punt for 73 yards
