= 1999 Illinois Fighting Illini football team =

American college football season

1999 Illinois Fighting Illini football

MicronPC Bowl champion

MicronPC Bowl, W 63–21 vs. Virginia
- Conference: Big Ten Conference

Ranking
- Coaches: No. 25
- AP: No. 24
- Record: 8–4 (4–4 Big Ten)
- Head coach: Ron Turner (3rd season)
- Offensive scheme: Pro-style
- Defensive coordinator: Tim Kish (3rd season)
- Base defense: 4–3
- MVP: Kurt Kittner
- Captains: Ray Redziniak; Danny Clark; Neil Rackers; Steve Havard
- Home stadium: Memorial Stadium

1999 Big Ten Conference football standings
	Conf.			Overall
Team	W		L	W		L
No. 4 Wisconsin $	7	–	1	10	–	2
No. 7 Michigan State	6	–	2	10	–	2
No. 5 Michigan %	6	–	2	10	–	2
No. 11 Penn State	5	–	3	10	–	3
No. 18 Minnesota	5	–	3	8	–	4
No. 24 Illinois	4	–	4	8	–	4
No. 25 Purdue	4	–	4	7	–	5
Ohio State	3	–	5	6	–	6
Indiana	3	–	5	4	–	7
Northwestern	1	–	7	3	–	8
Iowa	0	–	8	1	–	10
$ – BCS representative as conference champion; % – BCS at-large representative; Rankings from AP Poll

The 1999 Illinois Fighting Illini football team was an American football team that represented the University of Illinois at Urbana-Champaign as a member of the Big Ten Conference during the 1999 NCAA Division I-A football season. In their third year under head coach Ron Turner, the Fighting Illini compiled an 8–4 record (4–4 in conference games), finished in a tie for sixth place in the Big Ten, and outscored opponents by a total of 325 to 252. Illinois was the first team in 50 years to win road games against both Michigan and Ohio State in the same season.

The team's statistical leaders included quarterback Kurt Kittner (2,448 passing yards, 22 touchdown passes), running back Steve Havard (715 rushing yards), and wide receiver Michael Dean (43 receptions for 566 yards).

The team played its home games at Memorial Stadium in Champaign, Illinois.

== Schedule ==
Date	Time	Opponent	Site	TV	Result	Attendance	Source
September 4	2:30 pm	Arkansas State*	Memorial Stadium; Champaign, IL		W 41–3	34,227	
September 11	2:30 pm	San Diego State*	Memorial Stadium; Champaign, IL		W 38–10	35,798	
September 18	6:00 pm	at Louisville*	Papa John's Cardinal Stadium; Louisville, KY		W 41–36	40,332	
September 25	2:30 pm	No. 19 Michigan State	Memorial Stadium; Champaign, IL		L 10–27	52,417	
October 2	11:00 am	at Indiana	Memorial Stadium; Bloomington, IN (rivalry)	ESPN2	L 31–34 ^{OT}	30,381	
October 16	11:00 am	Minnesota^{†}	Memorial Stadium; Champaign, IN	ESPN2	L 7–37	49,152	
October 23	11:00 am	at No. 9 Michigan	Michigan Stadium; Ann Arbor, MI (rivalry)	ESPN Plus	W 35–29	110,188	
October 30	2:30 pm	No. 2 Penn State	Memorial Stadium; Champaign, IL	ABC	L 7–27	50,014	
November 6	1:00 pm	at Iowa	Kinnick Stadium; Iowa City, IA		W 40–24	61,350	
November 13	11:00 am	at No. 25 Ohio State	Ohio Stadium; Columbus, OH	ESPN2	W 46–20	93,429	
November 20	1:00 pm	Northwestern	Memorial Stadium; Champaign, IL		W 29–7	50,137	
December 30	6:00 pm	vs. Virginia*	Pro Player Stadium; Miami Gardens, FL (MicronPC Bowl)	TBS	W 63–21	31,089	
*Non-conference game; ^{†}Homecoming; Rankings from AP Poll released prior to the game; All times are in Central time

== Roster ==
1999 Illinois Fighting Illini football team roster
Players
Coaches
Offense

Pos.	#	Name	Class
RB	34	Jameel Cook	Jr
G	64	David Diehl	Fr
QB	15	Kurt Kittner	So
WR	17	Greg Lewis	So
WR	86	Aaron Moorehead	So
OT	59	Marques Sullivan	Jr
TE	87	Josh Whitman	Jr

Defense

Pos.	#	Name	Class
LB	48	Danny Clark	Sr
CB	6	Brandon Lloyd	Fr
DE	99	Fred Wakefield	Jr

Special teams

Pos.	#	Name	Class
LS	51	Nathan Hodel	Jr
K	98	Neil Rackers	Sr

Head coach

- Ron Turner

Coordinators/assistant coaches

- Craig Ver Steeg (QB/RC)

Legend

- (C) Team captain
- (S) Suspended
- (I) Ineligible
- Injured
- Redshirt

Roster

== Team players in the NFL ==
Player	Position	Round	Pick	NFL club
Neil Rackers	Kicker	6	169	Cincinnati Bengals
