= 2000 Gator Bowl =

2000 Toyota Gator Bowl
- 55th Gator Bowl
Georgia Tech Yellow Jackets	Miami Hurricanes
(8–3)	(8–4)
ACC	Big East
13	28
Head coach: George O'Leary	Head coach: Butch Davis
AP 17	AP 23
	1	2	3	4	Total
Georgia Tech	0	7	6	0	13
Miami	7	14	0	7	28
- Date: January 1, 2000
- Season: 1999
- Stadium: Alltel Stadium
- Location: Jacksonville, Florida
- MVP: LB Nate Webster (Miami); QB Joe Hamilton (Georgia Tech)
- Referee: Bill McCabe (Mtn. West)
- Attendance: 43,416

United States TV coverage
- Network: NBC
- Announcers: Tom Hammond, James Lofton, Craig Sager

The 2000 Gator Bowl featured the Georgia Tech Yellow Jackets and the Miami Hurricanes.

== Background ==
The Jackets had at one point been ranked as high as 7th in the polls before two losses had made them fall to 17th. They finished 2nd in the Atlantic Coast Conference. This was their third consecutive bowl season. The Hurricanes finished 2nd in the Big East Conference with a loss to Virginia Tech late in the season costing them a share of the title. But Miami was making their third bowl appearance under Davis, who was hired to help rebuild the program after a scandal that rocked the school in 1995.

== Game summary ==
Tech had multiple opportunities to score, but two interceptions and two missed field goals doomed the Jackets in their first bowl loss since 1978. Miami scored the first 14 points of the game on a James Jackson rushing touchdown and an Andre King touchdown catch from Kenny Kelly. Tech mustered a Joe Hamilton touchdown late in the first half but Miami scored before the half ended on a Clinton Portis 73 yard run to lead 21–7. From that point on, Tech scored just six points on two Luke Manget field goals, which narrowed it to 21–13. But Ken Dorsey's touchdown pass to Reggie Wayne midway through the fourth quarter sealed the game for the Hurricanes.

== Aftermath ==
The Jackets would go to one more bowl game with O'Leary before he left the program. The Jackets would return to the Gator Bowl seven years later. Miami would go to the Sugar Bowl the next year, their last bowl game with Davis before he departed for the Cleveland Browns.

== Statistics ==
Statistics	GT	Miami
First downs	29	22
Yards rushing	217	239
Yards passing	245	208
Total Offense Yards	462	447
Punts-Average	6-26.2	5-42.6
Fumbles-Lost	1-0	1-1
Interceptions	2	1
Penalties-Yards	7-75	9-90
Time of Possession	32:20	27:40
