= 1999 Virginia Tech Hokies football team =

American college football season

1999 Virginia Tech Hokies football

Big East champion Lambert-Meadowlands Trophy

Sugar Bowl (BCS NCG), L 29–46 vs. Florida State
- Conference: Big East Conference

Ranking
- Coaches: No. 3
- AP: No. 2
- Record: 11–1 (7–0 Big East)
- Head coach: Frank Beamer (13th season)
- Offensive coordinator: Rickey Bustle (6th season)
- Offensive scheme: Multiple
- Defensive coordinator: Bud Foster (5th season)
- Base defense: 4–4
- Home stadium: Lane Stadium

1999 Big East Conference football standings
	Conf.			Overall
Team	W		L	W		L
No. 2 Virginia Tech $	7	–	0	11	–	1
No. 15 Miami (FL)	6	–	1	9	–	4
Boston College	4	–	3	8	–	4
Syracuse	3	–	4	7	–	5
West Virginia	3	–	4	4	–	7
Pittsburgh	2	–	5	5	–	6
Temple	2	–	5	2	–	9
Rutgers	1	–	6	1	–	10
$ – BCS representative as conference champion; Rankings from AP Poll

== Season summary ==
The 1999 Virginia Tech Hokies football team represented Virginia Tech as a member of the Big East Conference during the 1999 NCAA Division I-A football season. Led by 13th-year head coach Frank Beamer, the Hokies compiled an 11–1 record — only the second perfect regular season in program history — and won the Big East title with a 7–0 conference mark before falling 46–29 to Florida State in the 2000 Sugar Bowl, the BCS National Championship Game. The season had announced itself before a single snap: a record crowd of 11,125 packed the spring scrimmage to watch incoming freshman Michael Vick, practice gates were closed in August because the crowds had become unmanageable, and ESPN analyst Lee Corso — the nation's most recognized college football voice — named Virginia Tech his preseason "sleeper pick" for the BCS title game. In 1998, director of football operations John Ballein had installed an empty trophy case in the football facility's Hall of Legends bearing a placard that read simply, "This area is reserved for the national championship trophy." When the AP preseason poll was released, the Hokies entered ranked 13th with one first-place vote; by season's end they had climbed to a program-best No. 2 in the final AP poll.

=== Program Transformation ===
The 1999 season represented the culmination of Frank Beamer's 13-year transformation of Virginia Tech from a regional program into a national powerhouse. The Hokies had risen from the depths of 2-9 seasons in the early 1990s to the brink of national championship contention through Beamer's philosophy of "Beamerball" — a relentless combination of special teams excellence, defensive toughness, and explosive big-play offense.

The anticipation for the 1999 season reached unprecedented levels in Blacksburg. The spring game drew 11,125 fans — a program record at the time — all eager to catch a glimpse of Michael Vick, the heralded freshman quarterback from Newport News, Virginia. The buzz around Vick was so intense that practice gates had to be closed in August as crowds became unmanageable. Lee Corso's preseason endorsement on ESPN carried particular weight, as the analyst had built a reputation for identifying emerging programs before they reached national prominence.

The empty trophy case installed by John Ballein in 1998 symbolized the program's transformed aspirations. No longer content with bowl appearances or conference titles, Virginia Tech was openly pursuing college football's ultimate prize. This bold declaration reflected the confidence that had grown through consecutive 10-win seasons in 1995 and 1996, the Big East championship and Alliance Bowl victory in 1996, and the program's first-ever national ranking finishes in 1997 and 1998.

=== The Michael Vick Phenomenon ===
Michael Vick fulfilled the anticipation and created new chapters. He ran for three touchdowns in his first 22 minutes of collegiate action before a somersaulting leap into the end zone injured his ankle and cost him the following week's game, but he was rarely slowed after that. He appeared on the cover of ESPN The Magazine, was named the nation's top college player at the ESPY Awards, and won the inaugural Archie Griffin Award as college football's most valuable player. He finished third in Heisman Trophy voting behind Ron Dayne and Joe Hamilton — matching the highest Heisman finish ever by a freshman at the time, first achieved by Herschel Walker in 1980 (Adrian Peterson later broke that mark, finishing second in 2004). Defensive end Corey Moore captured the season's arc when he said of his teammate at midpoint: "He's good enough right now to be in the Heisman Trophy race. In my opinion, he'll be a Heisman Trophy winner in the next year or two."

Vick's impact transcended statistics and redefined the quarterback position. His combination of blazing speed, cannon arm, and improvisational genius created problems for defenses that had never been seen at the college level. His signature scramble against West Virginia — a 34-yard run down the sideline with defenders grasping at air — became the most famous non-scoring play in program history and set up Shayne Graham's game-winning field goal in the "Miracle in Morgantown."

During comeback victory against Virginia, the statement win against Syracuse with College GameDay in town and the clutch performance against Miami — Vick played with experience of a seasoned quarterback. His ability to remain calm in the fourth quarter of close games became his defining characteristic, earning him the trust of teammates and coaches alike.

Vick's cultural impact extended far beyond the football field. He became a national sensation, appearing on talk shows and magazine covers while maintaining the humble demeanor that endeared him to Hokie fans. His success brought unprecedented national attention to Virginia Tech, transforming the program from a regional power into a household name. The "Vick Factor" helped Lane Stadium sellouts become routine and elevated the entire athletic department's profile.

=== The Lunch Pail Defense ===
Defensively, Bud Foster's "Lunch Pail Defense" led the nation in rushing defense, holding opponents to 75.9 yards per game on the ground, and ranked third nationally and first in the Big East in total defense at 247.3 yards allowed per game, while surrendering just 10.5 points per game across the regular season. The unit recorded 58 sacks for 449 yards lost, led by unanimous first-team All-American defensive end Corey Moore, who set a Big East record with 17 sacks for 150 yards and added 11 tackles for loss, earning the Bronko Nagurski Trophy, the Lombardi Award, and his second consecutive Big East Defensive Player of the Year award — the first player in conference history to win it back-to-back. Linebacker Jamel Smith led the team with 89 tackles, and cornerback Anthony Midget paced the secondary with four interceptions. The defense and special teams combined for seven non-offensive touchdowns — three interception returns and four fumble recoveries — contributing to a season scoring differential of 455–116.

The "Lunch Pail Defense" became more than just a scheme — it was a identity. Foster's defense embodied the blue-collar work ethic of Southwest Virginia. The actual lunch pails that players carried onto the field symbolized their commitment to outworking opponents through preparation, toughness, and relentless pursuit of the football.

Corey Moore's dominance in 1999 represented the pinnacle of Foster's system. Despite being listed at just 6-foot-1 and 240 pounds, Moore used exceptional quickness and leverage to dominate offensive linemen. His 17 sacks set a Big East record that still stands, and his ability to disrupt opposing offenses became the foundation of Virginia Tech's defensive success. Moore's back-to-back Big East Defensive Player of the Year awards established him as one of the greatest defensive players in conference history.

The defensive unit's versatility was its greatest strength. Against Syracuse, they recorded three defensive touchdowns in a 62-0 shutout. Against Miami, they forced five turnovers in a 43-10 victory. Against West Virginia, they delivered a crucial safety when Chris Cyrus sacked Brad Lewis in the end zone during the "Miracle in Morgantown." The defense's ability to score non-offensive touchdowns (seven in total) provided the Hokies with an additional weapon that few teams could match.

=== Coaching Excellence ===
Frank Beamer's leadership in 1999 earned him virtually every national coach of the year award. His ability to manage the attention surrounding the program while maintaining focus on weekly preparations made him one of the most respected coaches in college football.

The coaching staff's cohesion was critical to the season's success. Offensive coordinator Rickey Bustle adapted his system to maximize Vick's unique talents, incorporating more option plays and designed quarterback runs while maintaining the power running game that had been the program's foundation. Defensive coordinator Bud Foster continued to evolve his 4-4 scheme, adding more blitz packages and pressure schemes that took advantage of Moore's exceptional pass-rushing ability.

Special teams coordinator Danny Pearman's units continued to excel under Beamer's direct supervision. Shayne Graham's development into an All-American kicker provided the Hokies with a reliable weapon in close games, while the coverage units consistently won the field position battle. The punt return team, featuring Ricky Hall and Ronyell Whitaker, added another explosive element to the offense.

The staff's ability to develop players throughout the depth chart proved crucial during the season's challenges. When Vick missed the UAB game with an ankle injury, backup Dave Meyer stepped in and led the team to victory. When injuries hit the running back position, Lee Suggs emerged as a capable complement to Shyrone Stith. This depth development reflected the program's maturity and coaching staff's ability to maximize player potential.

=== Statistical Dominance ===
The offense led the nation with 41.4 points and 451.8 yards per game across the eleven regular-season contests — figures that exclude the Sugar Bowl under NCAA statistical rules then in effect for pre-2002 bowl games. Vick, playing in ten games, completed 90 of 152 passes for 1,840 yards, 12 touchdowns, and five interceptions, setting an NCAA freshman record with a 180.4 passing efficiency rating that also ranked third all-time. He added 585 rushing yards and eight touchdowns on 108 carries. Tailback Shyrone Stith led the ground game with 1,119 yards and thirteen touchdowns on 226 carries, accumulating 1,554 all-purpose yards to pace the team, while Andre Kendrick contributed 645 rushing yards and seven touchdowns as the primary backup. Wide receiver Andre Davis paced the receiving corps with 35 catches for 962 yards at a 27.5-yard average and twelve total touchdowns; Ricky Hall added 25 receptions for 398 yards and led the team in punt returns with 510 yards and a touchdown on 40 returns. Kicker Shayne Graham converted 17 of 22 field goal attempts and 56 of 57 extra points for 107 points, earning Big East Special Teams Player of the Year honors.

The statistical dominance of the 1999 team established numerous program records that still stand. The 41.4 points per game average remains the highest in Virginia Tech history, as does the 451.8 yards per game total. The team's scoring differential of +339 (455-116) over the regular season demonstrated their overwhelming superiority against opponents. These numbers were achieved against a schedule that included five ranked teams and multiple traditional rivals.

Individual performances reached historic levels. Vick's 180.4 passing efficiency rating as a freshman set an NCAA record that stood for years. His 12 total touchdowns (4 passing, 8 rushing) in Big East play established a conference freshman record. Davis's 27.5-yard average per catch ranked among the nation's leaders, while his 12 total touchdowns (7 receiving, 2 rushing, 1 punt return, 2 kickoff returns) showcased his versatility as a playmaker.

The defensive statistics were equally impressive. The 75.9 rushing yards allowed per game led the nation and remains one of the best performances in program history. The 58 sacks ranked second nationally and set a Big East single-season record. The defense's ability to create turnovers — 24 interceptions and 12 fumble recoveries — provided the offense with excellent field position throughout the season.

== Schedule ==
Date	Time	Opponent	Rank	Site	TV	Result	Attendance	Source
September 4	1:00 p.m.	James Madison*	No. 11	Lane Stadium; Blacksburg, VA		W 47–0	51,907	
September 11	1:00 p.m.	UAB*	No. 11	Lane Stadium; Blacksburg, VA		W 31–10	51,907	
September 23	8:00 p.m.	Clemson*	No. 8	Lane Stadium; Blacksburg, VA	ESPN	W 31–11	51,907	
October 2	6:00 p.m.	at No. 24 Virginia*	No. 8	Scott Stadium; Charlottesville, VA (rivalry)	ESPN2	W 31–7	51,800	
October 9	6:00 p.m.	at Rutgers	No. 6	Rutgers Stadium; Piscataway, NJ		W 58–20	30,764	
October 16	6:00 p.m.	No. 16 Syracuse^{†}	No. 4	Lane Stadium; Blacksburg, VA (College GameDay)	ESPN	W 62–0	53,130	
October 30	7:00 p.m.	at Pittsburgh	No. 3	Pitt Stadium; Pittsburgh, PA	ESPN2	W 30–17	42,678	
November 6	3:30 p.m.	at West Virginia	No. 3	Mountaineer Field; Morgantown, WV (rivalry)	CBS	W 22–20	56,906	
November 13	7:30 p.m.	No. 19 Miami (FL)	No. 2	Lane Stadium; Blacksburg, VA (rivalry, College GameDay)	ESPN	W 43–10	53,130	
November 20	12:00 p.m.	at Temple	No. 2	Veterans Stadium; Philadelphia, PA	ESPN2	W 62–7	25,822	
November 26	2:30 p.m.	No. 22 Boston College	No. 2	Lane Stadium; Blacksburg, VA (rivalry)	CBS	W 38–14	53,130	
January 4, 2000	8:00 p.m.	vs. No. 1 Florida State*	No. 2	Louisiana Superdome; New Orleans, LA (Sugar Bowl (BCS NCG), College GameDay)	ABC	L 29–46	79,280	
*Non-conference game; ^{†}Homecoming; Rankings from Coaches' Poll released prior to the game; All times are in Eastern time

== Rankings ==
Ranking movements Legend: ██ Increase in ranking ██ Decrease in ranking ( ) = First-place votes
	Week																
Poll	Pre	1	2	3	4	5	6	7	8	9	10	11	12	13	14	15	Final
AP	13 (1)	11 (1)	11 (1)	10 (1)	8 (1)	8 (1)	5 (1)	4 (1)	4 (2)	3 (5)	3 (6)	2 (4)	2 (6)	2 (4)	2 (6)	2 (6)	2
Coaches	14	14*	11	10	8	7	5	4	4	3	3 (2)	2 (1)	2 (1)	2 (2)	2 (3)	2 (3)	3
BCS	Not released									3	3	3	2	2	2	2	Not released

== Game summaries ==
=== James Madison ===
James Madison at Virginia Tech

Team	1	2	3	4	Total
Dukes	0	0	0	0	0
• No. 11 Hokies	14	12	14	7	47

- Date: September 4
- Location:
  Lane Stadium
  Blacksburg, VA
- Game start: 1:00 pm
- Elapsed time: 2:52
- Game attendance: 51,907
- Referee: John Smith
- Source: Box Score

Scoring summary
1	7:01	VT	Michael Vick 3-yard run (Shayne Graham kick)	VT 7–0
1	4:41	VT	Michael Vick 54-yard run (Shayne Graham kick)	VT 14–0
2	10:42	VT	Shayne Graham 32-yard field goal	VT 17–0
2	7:18	VT	Michael Vick 7-yard run (Shayne Graham kick)	VT 24–0
2	4:21	VT	Team safety	VT 26–0
3	8:56	VT	André Davis 22-yard run (Shayne Graham kick)	VT 33–0
3	3:12	VT	D. Meyer 2-yard run (Shayne Graham kick)	VT 40–0
4	11:58	VT	A. Kendrick 2-yard run (Shayne Graham kick)	VT 47–0

Freshman Michael Vick ran for three touchdowns in the first 22 minutes of the game, but left due to an injury after he somersaulted into the end zone on the third score. Playing in his first collegiate game, Vick had run for 54 yards, and thrown for 110 yards in leading the Hokies to a 24–0 lead that turned into a 47–0 win. Shyrone Stith led the Hokies on the ground with 122 yards on 18 carries. Andre Kendrick had 11 carries for 45 yards including a 2-yard touchdown that capped the scoring. Andre Davis scored on a 22-yard reverse and backup quarterback Dave Meyer had the other rushing touchdown for Tech. Shayne Graham kicked a 32-yard field goal. Corey Moore had a sack and two tackles for loss, including one that resulted in a JMU safety in the second quarter.

The win illustrated the offensive talents that made Vick such a hot prospect among freshmen players for the program. The young athlete's first appearance demonstrated a blend of running ability, accurate throwing, and pocket presence. Nevertheless, he sustained an injury due to celebrating in an unorthodox manner, which often leads commentators to comment on the dangers of playing like him.

=== UAB ===
UAB at Virginia Tech

Team	1	2	3	4	Total
Blazers	0	10	0	0	10
• No. 11 Hokies	10	7	0	14	31

- Date: September 11
- Location:
  Lane Stadium
  Blacksburg, VA
- Game start: 12:59 pm
- Elapsed time: 2:53
- Game attendance: 51,907
- Game weather: 72 °F (22 °C), Sunny, Wind NNW 5–8 mph (8.0–12.9 km/h)
- Referee: Alberto Riveron
- Source: Box Score

Scoring summary
1	7:01	VT	E. Johnson 41-yard pass from D. Meyer (Shayne Graham kick)	VT 7–0
1	3:54	VT	Shayne Graham 22-yard field goal	VT 10–0
2	9:44	VT	Shyrone Stith 1-yard run (Shayne Graham kick)	VT 17–0
2	3:50	UAB	P. Coleman 29-yard pass from D. Dixon (R. Gallego kick)	VT 17–7
2	0:38	UAB	J. Arians 47-yard field goal	VT 17–10
4	13:43	VT	André Davis 35-yard pass from A. Kendrick (Shayne Graham kick)	VT 24–10
4	2:07	VT	L. Suggs 1-yard run (Shayne Graham kick)	VT 31–10

Virginia Tech's defense set a school record, allowing only 63 yards of total offense, leading the Hokies over visiting University of Alabama Birmingham (UAB) 31–10. Tech played without starting quarterback Michael Vick, who was relieved by Dave Meyer. Meyer threw a 42-yard touchdown pass to Emmitt Johnson on the first series of the game to give Tech the lead it would never relinquish. However, before halftime, he turned the ball over four times, three interceptions and a fumble. Those turnovers enabled the Blazers to stay in the game, and Tech led by 17–10 at halftime thanks to a 22-yard field goal by Shayne Graham and a one-yard touchdown by Shyrone Stith. The lead remained at seven points until early in the fourth quarter when tailback Andre Kendrick threw a 35-yard option touchdown pass to Andre Davis. Lee Suggs capped the scoring with a one-yard touchdown jaunt with 2:07 left in the game, one of only four carries he had on the day. Stith led the Hokies with 129 rushing yards and Kendrick added 44 yards rushing to his passing touchdown. Corey Moore had three sacks for 27 yards and two tackles for loss for another three yards.

The victory without Vick demonstrated the team's depth and resilience. Meyer's struggles with turnovers in the first half created concern, but the defense's dominant performance — allowing just 63 total yards — kept the Hokies in control. The second-half adjustments showed the coaching staff's ability to adapt, while Kendrick's touchdown pass highlighted the offensive versatility that would become a hallmark of the season.

=== Clemson ===
Clemson at Virginia Tech

Team	1	2	3	4	Total
Tigers	0	3	0	8	11
• No. 8 Hokies	7	7	0	17	31

- Date: September 23
- Location:
  Lane Stadium
  Blacksburg, VA
- Game start: 8:02 pm
- Elapsed time: 3:08
- Game attendance: 51,907
- Game weather: 63 °F (17 °C), Clear & Chilly, Wind SW 3–5 mph (4.8–8.0 km/h)
- Referee: Robert Wood
- TV announcers (ESPN): Mike Tirico (play-by-play), Kirk Herbstreit (analyst), Lee Corso (analyst), and Dr. Jerry Punch (sideline)
- Source: Box Score

Scoring summary
1	1:12	VT	Shyrone Stith 3-yard run (Shayne Graham kick)	VT 7–0
2	14:12	VT	A. Kendrick 24-yard run (Shayne Graham kick)	VT 14–0
2	5:36	Clem	C. Campbell 27-yard field goal	VT 14–3
4	11:31	Clem	T. Lee 9-yard pass from T. Lazzara (J. Lemay pass)	VT 14–11
4	5:00	VT	Shayne Graham 47-yard field goal	VT 17–11
4	3:09	VT	Ike Charlton 34-yard interception return (Shayne Graham kick)	VT 24–11
4	2:31	VT	Corey Moore 32-yard fumble return (Shayne Graham kick)	VT 31–11

Virginia Tech led the entire way in this Thursday night ESPN contest, but needed two late scores by the defense to seal the win. The Hokies jumped out to a 14–0 lead during a two-minute span from the end of the first to the beginning of the second quarters when Shyrone Stith capped a drive with a three-yard run, putting them ahead 7–0 with 1:12 left in the first quarter. On their next possession, Virginia Tech quickly extended their lead. Freshman quarterback Michael Vick, playing for the first time since his first half injury against JMU, gained 31 yards on an option play, setting the stage for backup tailback Andre Kendrick to score on a 24-yard run. Clemson got on the board for the first time with a 27-yard field goal by Chris Campbell to make the half-time lead 14–3 Tech. The Tigers cut the Tech lead to a field goal when it ran a fake field goal from the Tech nine with place kicker Tony Lazzara passing to running back Vince Ciurciu. Clemson then converted a two-point attempt with a pass from quarterback Brandon Streeter to Jason LeMay, making the score 14–11. Shayne Graham gave the Hokies a six-point lead with five minutes left in the game before the country's top-ranked defense came through for the Hokies. First, Ike Charlton intercepted a pass and returned it 34 yards for a touchdown. Shortly afterward, All-American Corey Moore stripped the ball from the Clemson quarterback, recovered it, and ran 32 yards for his first career touchdown, sealing the 31–11 win. Tech piled up 285 rushing yards led by Stith's 162 yards and Vick's 60 yards. The Hokie defense allowed only 221 total yards, with only a net of 17 on the ground. Moore had two tackles for loss and two sacks while Jamel Smith led the team with 11 total tackles.

The defensive touchdowns in the final minutes exemplified the "Lunch Pail Defense" philosophy that Bud Foster had instilled. Moore's fumble return for a touchdown was particularly significant, as it marked the first time the All-American defensive end had scored in his college career. The victory on national television against a quality ACC opponent provided early validation for the program's national championship aspirations.

=== At Virginia ===
Virginia Tech at Virginia

Team	1	2	3	4	Total
• No. 8 Hokies	14	14	3	0	31
Cavaliers	0	7	0	0	7

- Date: October 2
- Location:
  Scott Stadium
  Charlottesville, VA
- Game start: 6:07 pm
- Elapsed time: 2:48
- Game attendance: 51,800
- Referee: John Smith
- Television network: ESPN2
- Source: Box Score

Scoring summary
1	9:15	VT	Andre Davis 60-yard pass from Michael Vick (Shayne Graham kick)	VT 7–0
1	2:21	VT	Shyrone Stith 1-yard run (Shayne Graham kick)	VT 14–0
2	12:10	UVA	B. Baber 1-yard pass from D. Ellis (T. Braverman kick)	VT 14–7
2	7:09	VT	Shyrone Stith 1-yard run (Shayne Graham kick)	VT 21–7
2	3:32	VT	Shyrone Stith 1-yard run (Shayne Graham kick)	VT 28–7
3	5:11	VT	Shayne Graham 48-yard field goal	VT 31–7

Michael Vick completed seven of nine passes for 222 yards and ran for another 40 yards to give the Hokies a dominating 31–7 win in their first away game of the season. Vick's cousin Aaron Brooks had torched Virginia Tech for a combined 735 passing yards and 70 points in the two previous meetings, but Brooks had moved on to the NFL and it was the younger cousin who had his way this time. Chad Beasley's sack on Virginia's first possession set the tone — it was the first of six sacks on the night for the Hokie defense. On its second possession, Vick threw his first collegiate touchdown pass when he hit André Davis in stride for a 60-yard strike to open the scoring. Shyrone Stith then scored on three one-yard runs before the end of the first half to put the Hokies up 28–7 at the break, rushing for 113 yards on 23 carries. The Tech defense held the 24th-ranked Cavaliers to 51 net yards rushing and recorded six sacks and seven tackles for loss, with John Engelberger accounting for two of each. "I've been telling you all along that I'm high on my quarterback," Beamer said afterward. Following two upsets elsewhere in the polls, Virginia Tech entered the top five in the AP poll for the first time in program history.

The rivalry victory carried special significance for the program. The dominance over Virginia — with Vick outperforming his more famous cousin — represented a symbolic passing of the torch. The six sacks demonstrated the defense's ability to disrupt even the most prepared opponents, while Vick's precision passing (7 of 9 for 222 yards) showed his development beyond just running ability. The victory marked Virginia Tech's entry into the top five, a milestone that signaled the program's arrival on the national stage.

=== At Rutgers ===
Virginia Tech at Rutgers

Team	1	2	3	4	Total
• No. 5 Hokies	14	35	7	2	58
Scarlet Knights	14	0	0	6	20

- Date: October 9
- Location:
  Rutgers Stadium
  Piscataway, NJ
- Game start: 6:05 pm
- Elapsed time: 3:03
- Game attendance: 30,764
- Referee: Jack Cramer
- Source: Box Score

Scoring summary
1	14:42	VT	Andre Davis 74-yard pass from Michael Vick (Shayne Graham kick)	VT 7–0
1	10:27	RU	M. McMahon 12-yard run (S. Barone kick)	Tied 7–7
1	6:35	VT	J. Ferguson 20-yard run (Shayne Graham kick)	VT 14–7
1	5:22	RU	L. J. Smith 36-yard pass from M. McMahon (S. Barone kick)	Tied 14–14
2	12:07	VT	Andre Davis 13-yard pass from Michael Vick (Shayne Graham kick)	VT 21–14
2	7:39	VT	Shyrone Stith 2-yard run (Shayne Graham kick)	VT 28–14
2	3:39	VT	R. Hall 36-yard pass from Michael Vick (Shayne Graham kick)	VT 35–14
2	1:40	VT	Michael Vick 22-yard run (Shayne Graham kick)	VT 42–14
2	0:26	VT	R. Hall 5-yard pass from Michael Vick (Shayne Graham kick)	VT 49–14
3	6:21	VT	A. Kendrick 10-yard run (Shayne Graham kick)	VT 56–14
4	4:36	RU	S. Stanton 11-yard run (kick blocked)	VT 56–20
4	4:36	VT	R. Whitaker 98-yard PAT return	VT 58–20

The fifth-ranked Hokies put up 35 points in the second quarter to throttle the Scarlet Knights 58–20 in Piscataway, NJ. Vick opened on the game's first play with a perfect over-the-shoulder 74-yard touchdown pass to Andre Davis. The Scarlet Knights kept pace early as Mike McMahon ran in for a 12-yard score and then connected on a 36-yard pass to L.J. Smith to tie it 14–14, but Vick then closed the noose. He hit Davis for a second touchdown on a 13-yard slant, followed with a two-yard run by Stith, a 36-yard rope to Ricky Hall, a 22-yard scramble, and a five-yard strike to Hall again — 35 second-quarter points that matched a Big East record. Vick finished 11-of-12 passing, setting a Big East record for completion percentage in a game, for 248 yards and four touchdown passes, adding 68 rushing yards and a score. Ironically, the 49–14 halftime score matched the exact total Tech had posted on this same field in 1992 — a game the Hokies lost 50–49 on the final play. Ronyell Whitaker returned a blocked PAT 98 yards for a two-point defensive score to cap the 58-point effort. Moore's defense had five sacks for 38 yards and six tackles for loss. "He's good enough right now to be in the Heisman Trophy race," Moore said of Vick after the game. "In my opinion he'll be a Heisman Trophy winner in the next year or two."

The explosive offensive performance showcased Vick at his most dominant. His 11-of-12 passing performance demonstrated remarkable precision, while the 35-point second quarter represented one of the most devastating offensive bursts in program history. Corey Moore's post-game comments about Vick's Heisman potential marked the moment when the freshman's greatness became undeniable to a national audience.

=== No. 16 Syracuse ===
Syracuse at Virginia Tech

Team	1	2	3	4	Total
No. 16 Orangemen	0	0	0	0	0
• No. 4 Hokies	14	17	17	14	62

- Date: October 16
- Location:
  Lane Stadium
  Blacksburg, VA
- Game start: 6:08 pm
- Elapsed time: 3:24
- Game attendance: 53,130
- Referee: Dennis Hennigan
- Television network: ESPN
- Source: Box Score

Scoring summary
1	7:26	VT	Corey Bird 26-yard fumble return (Shayne Graham kick)	VT 7–0
1	2:24	VT	Shyrone Stith 1-yard run (Shayne Graham kick)	VT 14–0
2	12:58	VT	R. Hall 8-yard pass from Michael Vick (Shayne Graham kick)	VT 21–0
2	6:13	VT	Shyrone Stith 1-yard run (Shayne Graham kick)	VT 28–0
2	0:23	VT	Shayne Graham 25-yard field goal	VT 31–0
3	13:01	VT	Shayne Graham 37-yard field goal	VT 34–0
3	10:08	VT	A. Kendrick 7-yard run (Shayne Graham kick)	VT 41–0
3	1:34	VT	Andre Davis 28-yard run (Shayne Graham kick)	VT 48–0
4	4:56	VT	P. Summers 43-yard interception return (Shayne Graham kick)	VT 55–0
4	2:33	VT	T. Butler fumble recovery in end zone (Shayne Graham kick)	VT 62–0

ESPN's College GameDay came to Blacksburg for the first time, with Lee Corso — who had picked Virginia Tech as his preseason BCS sleeper — putting on the Hokie Bird headgear at the end of the show to stick with his pick. Virginia Tech scored two touchdowns in every quarter, including three by the defense, shutting out 16th-ranked Syracuse 62–0. At the time it was the largest margin of defeat ever suffered by a ranked team, surpassing Army's 61–0 shutout of No. 6 Penn State in 1945. Syracuse had not lost by that margin since Princeton beat it 62–0 in 1912. Cory Bird opened the scoring midway through the first quarter with a 26-yard fumble return, and Stith scored another of his familiar one-yard touchdowns to make it 14–0. Tech drove 80 yards for a Vick-to-Hall touchdown and then 75 yards for another Stith one-yarder to push the lead to 28–0 by the half. Phillip Summers picked a tipped ball out of the air and spun away from a sure tackle to go 43 yards for a pick-six in the fourth quarter, and Tee Butler fell on a bobbled snap in the end zone to complete the rout. Beamer apologized to Syracuse coach Paul Pasqualoni for the two late defensive scores. Stith rushed for 140 yards and two touchdowns; Kendrick added 65 yards and a score. The Tech defense held Syracuse to 77 net rushing yards and just 43 passing yards — 120 total — with 12 tackles for loss and two sacks.

The College GameDay victory represented the program's coronation on the national stage. The 62-0 margin against a ranked opponent on national television sent a powerful statement about Virginia Tech's championship credentials. The defensive touchdowns — particularly the late scores that prompted Beamer's apology to Pasqualoni — demonstrated the unit's relentless mentality. The victory established Lane Stadium as one of the most intimidating environments in college football and solidified Virginia Tech's status as a legitimate national title contender.

=== At Pittsburgh ===
Virginia Tech at Pittsburgh

Team	1	2	3	4	Total
• No. 3 Hokies	10	17	0	3	30
Panthers	0	7	7	3	17

- Date: October 30
- Location:
  Pitt Stadium
  Pittsburgh, PA
- Game start: 7:07 pm
- Elapsed time: 3:26
- Game attendance: 42,678
- Referee: Jack Cramer
- Television network: ESPN2
- Source: Box Score

Scoring summary
1	10:48	VT	Michael Vick 46-yard run (Shayne Graham kick)	VT 7–0
1	1:33	VT	Shayne Graham 46-yard field goal	VT 10–0
2	14:09	Pitt	N. Goings 1-yard run (N. Lotz kick)	VT 10–7
2	10:53	VT	Andre Davis 37-yard pass from Michael Vick (Shayne Graham kick)	VT 17–7
2	3:41	VT	Shyrone Stith 9-yard run (Shayne Graham kick)	VT 24–7
2	0:07	VT	Shayne Graham 32-yard field goal	VT 27–7
3	12:02	Pitt	Antonio Bryant 16-yard pass from D. Priestley (N. Lotz kick)	VT 27–14
4	14:47	Pitt	N. Lotz 23-yard field goal	VT 27–17
4	11:09	VT	Shayne Graham 52-yard field goal	VT 30–17

The Hokies won 30–17 at Pitt Stadium, improving to 7–0 for the first time since 1967. Pittsburgh quarterback David Priestley threw for 407 yards on 28-of-46 passing — the most passing yards allowed by Virginia Tech since 1993 — but the Hokies recorded nine sacks for 60 yards in losses, limiting Pitt to minus-12 net rushing yards for the game. Vick opened the scoring with a 46-yard burst through the Pitt defense and connected with André Davis on a 37-yard touchdown pass to build a 24–7 halftime lead. Graham added a 52-yard field goal in the fourth quarter to put the game away. Vick finished 10-of-17 for 170 yards with a net of 70 rushing yards on 11 carries. Andre Kendrick ran for 59 yards to set up Stith's nine-yard touchdown.

The victory at historic Pitt Stadium demonstrated the team's ability to overcome adversity. Despite allowing 407 passing yards — the most against Virginia Tech in six years — the defense's nine sacks and relentless pressure prevented Pittsburgh from establishing any offensive rhythm. The 7-0 start matched the best beginning to a season in 32 years and reinforced the team's national championship credentials.

=== At West Virginia ===
Virginia Tech at West Virginia

Team	1	2	3	4	Total
• No. 3 Hokies	0	7	5	10	22
Mountaineers	0	7	0	13	20

- Date: November 6
- Location:
  Mountaineer Field
  Morgantown, WV
- Game start: 3:32 pm
- Elapsed time: 3:48
- Game attendance: 56,906
- Referee: Jim Maconaghy
- Television network: CBS
- Source: Box Score

Scoring summary
2	7:38	VT	A. Kendrick 46-yard run (Shayne Graham kick)	VT 7–0
2	0:47	WVU	K. Ivory 6-yard pass from M. Bulger (kick)	Tied 7–7
3	11:24	VT	Shayne Graham 20-yard field goal	VT 10–7
3	3:41	WVU	Safety – Chris Cyrus sack of B. Lewis in end zone	VT 12–7
4	4:59	VT	Shyrone Stith 6-yard run (Shayne Graham kick)	VT 19–7
4	3:15	WVU	J. Porter 4-yard pass from B. Lewis (kick)	VT 19–14
4	1:44	WVU	K. Ivory 18-yard pass from B. Lewis (2-pt failed)	WVU 20–19
4	0:05	VT	Shayne Graham 44-yard field goal	VT 22–20

Now simply known in Hokie Nation as the "Miracle in Morgantown," Virginia Tech's 22–20 victory at Mountaineer Field preserved the undefeated season against a West Virginia team that had come close to upsetting Miami the week before. Penn State, the second-ranked team in the BCS standings, fell to Minnesota 24–23 on a last-second field goal the same afternoon, opening the door for the Hokies. Andre Kendrick's 46-yard touchdown run at the 22-minute mark broke a scoreless tie, but West Virginia answered with Marc Bulger's six-yard touchdown pass to Khori Ivory to knot the score at 7–7 at halftime. A Graham field goal and a safety — Chris Cyrus sacking Brad Lewis in the end zone — gave Tech a 12–7 lead before Stith's six-yard run pushed it to 19–7 with five minutes left. Then Stith fumbled a kickoff return, and West Virginia scored twice in 104 seconds to take a 20–19 lead with 1:44 remaining. Vick took the Hokies from their own 15 with 1:11 left, scrambling 34 yards down the sideline on one play — the most famous non-scoring play in Tech history — to move into Graham's range. With five seconds left, Graham — who had never made a game-winning field goal in his career — split the uprights from 44 yards to complete the miracle. Tech players carried him from the field.

The "Miracle in Morgantown" became the defining moment of the regular season. Vick's 34-yard scramble — evading multiple defenders while racing down the sideline — represented the essence of his improvisational genius. Graham's game-winning field goal, the first of his career, demonstrated the senior's development under pressure. The victory, coupled with Penn State's loss, positioned Virginia Tech for a potential BCS championship game berth and created the momentum that carried through the remainder of the season.

=== No. 19 Miami (FL) ===
Miami (FL) at Virginia Tech

Team	1	2	3	4	Total
No. 19 Hurricanes	10	0	0	0	10
• No. 2 Hokies	7	7	6	23	43

- Date: November 13
- Location:
  Lane Stadium
  Blacksburg, VA
- Game start: 7:38 pm
- Elapsed time: 3:30
- Game attendance: 53,130
- Referee: John Smith
- Television network: ESPN
- Source: Box Score

Scoring summary
1	12:05	Mia	A. Crosland 28-yard field goal	Mia 3–0
1	8:22	Mia	A. King 7-yard pass from K. Kelly (A. Crosland kick)	Mia 10–0
1	4:35	VT	Shyrone Stith 1-yard run (Shayne Graham kick)	Mia 10–7
2	9:24	VT	Shyrone Stith 41-yard run (Shayne Graham kick)	VT 14–10
3	11:42	VT	Shayne Graham 42-yard field goal	VT 17–10
3	6:18	VT	Shayne Graham 28-yard field goal	VT 20–10
4	13:07	VT	R. Hall 64-yard punt return (Shayne Graham kick)	VT 27–10
4	12:45	VT	Ike Charlton 51-yard fumble return (Shayne Graham kick)	VT 34–10
4	9:18	VT	Shayne Graham 42-yard field goal	VT 37–10
4	6:39	VT	André Davis fumble recovery in end zone (Shayne Graham kick)	VT 43–10

College GameDay returned to Blacksburg for the Miami game as Tennessee — then ranked No. 2 in the BCS — fell to Arkansas the same evening, handing Tech control of its own destiny. Miami jumped to a 10–0 first-quarter lead after Vick fumbled at midfield, but the Hokies responded with their characteristic formula: defensive momentum leading to short fields. David Pugh forced a Clinton Portis fumble, Ike Charlton carried it to the 24, and a Miami personal foul moved it to the 12 before Stith scored from one yard to cut the deficit to three. Anthony Midget's interception set up Stith's 41-yard dash for the lead at 14–10, which the Hokies held at the half. Graham added field goals of 42 and 28 yards in the third quarter to push the margin to 20–10 going into the fourth. Then the roof fell in on Miami. Hall returned a punt 64 yards for a touchdown, and on the very next series Charlton scooped up a fumble and raced 51 yards for another score — two touchdowns on consecutive possessions from the special teams and defense. Midget finished with three interceptions, and Davis won a scramble for a loose ball in the end zone to close a 43–10 final. Miami went on to win its final three games and finish 15th in the country, giving the performance extra luster in retrospect.

The victory over Miami solidified Virginia Tech's status as an elite program. The comeback from a 10-0 deficit against a traditional power demonstrated the team's mental toughness. The two fourth-quarter touchdowns on special teams and defense — Hall's punt return and Charlton's fumble return — exemplified the "Beamerball" philosophy that had defined the program's rise. With Tennessee's loss earlier in the day, Virginia Tech controlled its own destiny for the BCS championship game.

=== At Temple ===
Virginia Tech at Temple

Team	1	2	3	4	Total
• No. 2 Hokies	10	17	21	14	62
Owls	7	0	0	0	7

- Date: November 20
- Location:
  Veterans Stadium
  Philadelphia, PA
- Game start: 12:10 pm
- Elapsed time: 3:14
- Game attendance: 25,822
- Game weather: 61 °F (16 °C), Cloudy, Wind SW 10 mph (16 km/h)
- Referee: Thomas DeJoseph
- TV announcers (ESPN2): Rich Waltz (play-by-play), Gino Torretta (analyst), and Don McPherson (sideline)
- Source: Box Score

Scoring summary
1	11:50	TU	M. Godfrey 2-yard run (Cap Poklemba kick)	Temple 7–0
1	10:49	VT	Michael Vick 53-yard run (Shayne Graham kick)	Tied 7–7
1	0:38	VT	Shayne Graham 28-yard field goal	VT 10–7
2	14:50	VT	L. Austin 31-yard interception return (Shayne Graham kick)	VT 17–7
2	2:25	VT	André Davis 65-yard pass from Michael Vick (Shayne Graham kick)	VT 24–7
2	0:06	VT	Shayne Graham 34-yard field goal	VT 27–7
3	13:08	VT	Michael Vick 75-yard run (Shayne Graham kick)	VT 34–7
3	4:43	VT	André Davis 30-yard pass from Michael Vick (Shayne Graham kick)	VT 41–7
3	2:05	VT	A. Kendrick 20-yard run (Shayne Graham kick)	VT 48–7
4	14:48	VT	A. Kendrick 3-yard run (Shayne Graham kick)	VT 55–7
4	8:38	VT	Lee Suggs 2-yard run (Shayne Graham kick)	VT 62–7

Virginia Tech came to Veterans Stadium with the memory of its stunning 28–24 loss to Temple the previous year fresh in every mind. Temple scored first on a two-yard run, but Vick responded immediately with a 53-yard touchdown scramble to tie it, then found André Davis on a 65-yard catch-and-run in the second quarter and connected with Davis again for 30 yards in the third. Vick's signature play was a 75-yard improvised run in which he went the wrong direction before weaving untouched through the entire Temple defense to open the third quarter — his biggest rushing day ever at 159 yards, with 134 net after sacks. Davis finished with 121 of Vick's 196 passing yards. Kendrick ran in two touchdowns and Lee Suggs scored his first collegiate touchdown. The Tech defense held Temple to minus-two rushing yards on the day. Beamer pulled his first string with 14:48 left in the fourth quarter and the Hokies up 52–7, then chose to run a dive play rather than kick a field goal on a fourth-and-one from the Temple two as time expired.

The victory represented redemption from the previous season's stunning loss to Temple. Vick's 75-yard run — where he initially went the wrong direction before reversing field and racing through the entire defense — became one of the most iconic plays of the season. The decision to run a touchdown rather than kick a field goal at the end demonstrated Beamer's aggressive mentality and his team's desire to make statements rather than simply win games.

=== No. 22 Boston College ===
Boston College at Virginia Tech

Team	1	2	3	4	Total
No. 22 Eagles	0	0	7	7	14
• No. 2 Hokies	7	17	0	14	38

- Date: November 26
- Location:
  Lane Stadium
  Blacksburg, VA
- Game start: 2:41 pm
- Elapsed time: 3:13
- Game attendance: 53,130
- Game weather: 58 °F (14 °C), Scattered Showers/Thunderstorms, Wind W 10–15 mph (16–24 km/h)
- Referee: Dennis Hennigan
- Television network: CBS
- Source: Box Score

Scoring summary
1	12:24	VT	Shyrone Stith 3-yard run (Shayne Graham kick)	VT 7–0
2	13:15	VT	André Davis 69-yard pass from Michael Vick (Shayne Graham kick)	VT 14–0
2	9:12	VT	André Davis 59-yard pass from Michael Vick (Shayne Graham kick)	VT 21–0
2	2:40	VT	Shayne Graham 40-yard field goal	VT 24–0
3	1:08	BC	D. Dewalt 97-yard pass from Tim Hasselbeck (J. Matich kick)	VT 24–7
4	12:37	VT	C. Hawkins 30-yard pass from Michael Vick (Shayne Graham kick)	VT 31–7
4	3:27	VT	Michael Vick 5-yard run (Shayne Graham kick)	VT 38–7
4	0:46	BC	William Green 45-yard run (J. Matich kick)	VT 38–14

Virginia Tech completed the program's first perfect regular season since 1918, defeating No. 22 Boston College 38–14 to finish 11–0. On the very first play, Vick took the snap at his own two, escaped two defensive linemen, split the linebackers, and eluded a diving defensive back before being hauled down 34 yards later — setting the tone for an afternoon of arm and leg. Stith dove in from three yards on the opening drive for his 13th touchdown of the season. In the second quarter Vick launched two deep strikes to André Davis — 62 yards in the air for a 69-yard touchdown, then 60 yards in the air across his body on the run for a 59-yard score — to push the lead to 21–0. Graham's 40-yard field goal made it 24–0 at the half. Tim Hasselbeck's 97-yard touchdown pass to Dedrick Dewalt in the third quarter — the longest pass ever thrown against Tech at Lane Stadium, a record that still stands — kept BC in it briefly, before Vick hit Cullen Hawkins with a diving 30-yard catch in the fourth and then ran five yards for the final score, disappearing symbolically into the Hokie Stone tunnel as sugar cubes rained down from the crowd. Vick finished 11-of-13 for 291 yards and three touchdowns, carrying nine times for 157 positive yards. Meanwhile, Colorado upset Nebraska 30–27 in overtime to eliminate the Cornhuskers from BCS contention, all but guaranteeing Tech a spot in the national championship game.

The perfect regular season represented the culmination of the program's transformation. Vick's first play — a 34-yard scramble from his own end zone — set the tone for a performance that combined improvisational brilliance with surgical precision. The two deep touchdown passes to Davis, thrown on the run and across his body, demonstrated the freshman's exceptional arm talent. The celebration with sugar cubes raining down as Vick disappeared into the tunnel symbolized the realization of a dream that had begun with the installation of that empty trophy case in 1998.

=== No. 1 Florida State (Sugar Bowl) ===
Virginia Tech vs. Florida State

Team	1	2	3	4	Total
No. 2 Hokies	7	7	15	0	29
• No. 1 Seminoles	14	14	0	18	46

- Date: January 4, 2000
- Location:
  Louisiana Superdome
  New Orleans
- Game start: 7:20 pm
- Elapsed time: 3:55
- Game attendance: 79,280
- Game weather: Indoors
- Referee: Steve Shaw
- TV announcers (ABC): Brent Musburger (play-by-play), Gary Danielson (analyst), Lynn Swann (sideline), and Jack Arute (sideline)
- Source: Box Score

Scoring summary
1	3:22	FSU	Warrick 64-yard pass from Weinke (Janikowski kick)	FSU 7–0
1	2:14	FSU	Chaney 6-yard blocked punt return (Janikowski kick)	FSU 14–0
1	0:30	VT	André Davis 49-yard pass from Michael Vick (Shayne Graham kick)	FSU 14–7
2	13:45	FSU	Dugans 63-yard pass from Weinke (Janikowski kick)	FSU 21–7
2	11:40	FSU	Warrick 59-yard punt return (Janikowski kick)	FSU 28–7
2	0:37	VT	Michael Vick 3-yard run (Shayne Graham kick)	FSU 28–14
3	7:54	VT	Shayne Graham 23-yard field goal	FSU 28–17
3	5:57	VT	Andre Kendrick 29-yard run (2-point pass failed)	FSU 28–23
3	2:13	VT	Andre Kendrick 6-yard run (2-point pass failed)	VT 29–28
4	12:59	FSU	Dugans 14-yard pass from Weinke (Warrick pass from Weinke)	FSU 36–29
4	10:26	FSU	Janikowski 32-yard field goal	FSU 39–29
4	7:42	FSU	Warrick 43-yard pass from Chris Weinke (Janikowski kick)	FSU 46–29

Tech faced No. 1 Florida State in the Sugar Bowl at the Louisiana Superdome in New Orleans, Louisiana. The game served as the Bowl Championship Series (BCS) National Championship and marked Virginia Tech's first appearance in a title game. Florida State won 46–29 to complete a perfect season and claim the national championship. Florida State jumped out to a 28–14 halftime lead behind explosive plays, including a 64-yard touchdown pass from Chris Weinke to Peter Warrick and a 59-yard punt return touchdown by Warrick. Virginia Tech responded with a 49-yard touchdown pass from Michael Vick to André Davis and a 3-yard touchdown run by Vick. In the third quarter, Virginia Tech rallied to take a 29–28 lead. Shayne Graham kicked a 23-yard field goal, and Andre Kendrick added touchdown runs of 29 and 6 yards. Florida State regained control in the fourth quarter, scoring 18 unanswered points. Weinke threw touchdown passes to Ron Dugans and Warrick, and Sebastian Janikowski added a field goal. Michael Vick finished with 225 passing yards, 97 rushing yards, one passing touchdown, and one rushing touchdown. Andre Kendrick rushed for 63 yards and two touchdowns. André Davis led all receivers with 108 yards and one touchdown. Defensively, Jamel Smith recorded 10 tackles, while Corey Moore added two sacks. Virginia Tech outgained Florida State on the ground 278 to 30 but allowed 329 passing yards and three touchdown receptions to Warrick.

The national championship game, despite the loss, represented a validation of the program's rise. The third-quarter comeback from a 14-point deficit against Florida State's talent demonstrated the Hokies' championship mentality. Vick's performance — 225 passing yards, 97 rushing yards, and two total touchdowns — announced his arrival as a future NFL superstar. While the loss stung, the journey from the depths of 2-9 seasons to the national championship game in just eight seasons stood as one of the most remarkable turnarounds in college football history.

== Roster ==
1999 Virginia Tech Hokies football team roster
Players
Coaches
Offense

Pos.	#	Name	Class
OT	75	Robert Adams	Sr
FB	47	Wayne Briggs	So
TB	20	Keith Burnell	Fr
TE	85	Derek Carter	Jr
WR	88	Andre Davis	So
C	61	Steve DeMasi	Jr
WR	48	Mike Donahue	Jr
FB	27	Jarrett Ferguson	So
SE	15	Marcus Gildersleeve	Sr
C	64	Jake Grove	Fr
SE	82	Ricky Hall	Sr
OT	66	Jeff Hartzog	Jr
FB	42	Cullen Hawkins	Jr
OT	70	Jermaine Hinkson	Fr
FS	33	Steven Hunt	Sr
TE	91	Caleb Hurd	Sr
WR	18	Emmett Johnson	So
OT	76	Dave Kadela	Jr
TB	4	André Kendrick	Jr
G	59	Anthony Lambo	Jr
G	69	Matt Lehr	Jr
G	53	Robbie Lewis	So
G	63	Joe Marchant	Sr
QB	13	Dave Meyer	Jr
TE	80	Greg Myers	Jr
G	72	Daniel Nihipali	Sr
QB	11	Grant Noel	Fr
G	74	Luke Owens	Fr
WR	86	Terrell Parham	Fr
FS	35	Willie Pile	Fr
OT	79	Josh Redding	Jr
FS	31	Reggie Samuel	So
G	50	Jim Satterwhite	Sr
C	62	Tim Schnecker	Sr
OT	65	Tim Selmon	Fr
WR	19	Greg Shockley	Sr
C	52	Keith Short	Sr
TE	87	Bob Slowikowski	So
FS	14	Nick Sorensen	Jr
TB	38	Shyrone Stith	Jr
TB	22	Lee Suggs	Fr
ROV	8	Phillip Summers	Jr
QB	7	Michael Vick	Fr
FB	32	Wayne Ward	So
OT	58	Matt Wincek	So
TE	93	Browning Wynn	So

Defense

Pos.	#	Name	Class
CB	24	Larry Austin	So
DT	94	Chad Beasley	So
ROV	16	Cory Bird	Jr
DT	81	Franklin Bowser	Jr
DT	77	Carl Bradley	Sr
LB	30	Tee Butler	Jr
DT	57	Vincent Carag	So
CB	3	Ike Charlton	Jr
DE	28	Lamar Cobb	Fr
DE	51	Ron Cook	So
DE	99	Chris Cyrus	Sr
DE	96	John Engelberger	Sr
DE	97	Jim Ferugio	So
DT	90	Thenus Franklin	Fr
LB	43	Michael Hawkes	Sr
CB	5	Philip Hicks	So
LB	41	Jake Houseright	So
LB	23	T.J. Jackson	Fr
ROV	37	Chris Krebs	So
LB	39	Alex Markogiannakis	Fr
CB	9	Anthony Midget	Sr
DE	98	Derrius Monroe	Jr
DE	56	Corey Moore	Sr
DE	49	Derek Piniella	So
DT	71	David Pugh	So
DT	60	Jason Raynor	Jr
LB	46	Jamel Smith	Sr
LB	40	Ben Taylor	So
LB	44	Travis Turner	Fr
LB	34	Brian Welch	So
LB	36	Marvin Whilby	So
CB	2	Ronyell Whitaker	So
DE	54	Dan Wilkinson	So
DT	92	Nathaniel Williams	Sr
LB	45	Benny Wolfe	Jr

Special teams

Pos.	#	Name	Class
DS	68	Cliff Anders	Sr
DS	25	Shane Beamer	Sr
P	89	Michael Davis	Jr
K	17	Shayne Graham	Sr
DS	55	Ken Keister	So
P	95	Jimmy Kibble	Sr

Head coach

- Frank Beamer

Coordinators/assistant coaches

- Billy Hite – Assistant head coach / running backs
- Rickey Bustle – Offensive coordinator / quarterbacks
- Bud Foster – Defensive coordinator / inside linebackers / special teams
- Tony Ball – Wide receivers
- Jim Cavanaugh – Strong safety / outside linebackers
- Danny Pearman – Tight ends / offensive tackles
- Bryan Stinespring – Offensive line
- Lou West – Defensive backfield
- Charley Wiles – Defensive line
- John Ballein – Assistant athletic director for football operations
- Daniel Ferrell – Graduate assistant
- Jon Shields – Graduate assistant

Legend

- (C) Team captain
- (S) Suspended
- (I) Ineligible
- Injured
- Redshirt

Roster

== Awards and honors ==
- Michael Vick – Big East Rookie of the Year, Big East Offensive Player of the Year, First-Team All-American, Archie Griffin Award, Heisman Trophy finalist (3rd)
- Corey Moore – Big East Defensive Player of the Year, Unanimous First-Team All-American, Bronko Nagurski Trophy, Lombardi Award
- Shayne Graham – Big East Special Teams Player of the Year
- Frank Beamer – Big East Coach of the Year, AFCA Coach of the Year, AP Coach of the Year, Bobby Dodd Coach of the Year Award, Eddie Robinson Coach of the Year, George Munger Award, Paul "Bear" Bryant Award, Walter Camp Coach of the Year Award

== Players in the 2000 NFL draft ==
The following players were selected in the 2000 NFL draft following the season.

Player	Position	Round	Pick	Franchise
John Engelberger	Defensive end	2	35	San Francisco 49ers
Ike Charlton	Defensive back	2	52	Seattle Seahawks
Corey Moore	Linebacker	3	89	Buffalo Bills
Anthony Midget	Defensive back	5	134	Atlanta Falcons
Shyrone Stith	Running back	7	243	Jacksonville Jaguars
