= 1999 NC State Wolfpack football team =

American college football team season

1999 NC State Wolfpack football
- Conference: Atlantic Coast Conference
- Record: 6–6 (3–5 ACC)
- Head coach: Mike O'Cain (7th season)
- Offensive coordinator: Jimmy Kiser (3rd season)
- Co-defensive coordinators: Kent Briggs (4th season); Jeff Snipes (3rd season)
- Home stadium: Carter–Finley Stadium

1999 Atlantic Coast Conference football standings
| | Conf. | | | Overall |
| Team | W | | L | W | | L |
|---|---|---|---|---|---|---|
| No. 1 Florida State $# | 8 | – | 0 | 12 | – | 0 |
| No. 17 Georgia Tech | 5 | – | 3 | 8 | – | 4 |
| Virginia | 5 | – | 3 | 7 | – | 5 |
| Clemson | 5 | – | 3 | 6 | – | 6 |
| Wake Forest | 3 | – | 5 | 7 | – | 5 |
| NC State | 3 | – | 5 | 6 | – | 6 |
| Duke | 3 | – | 5 | 3 | – | 8 |
| Maryland | 2 | – | 6 | 5 | – | 6 |
| North Carolina | 2 | – | 6 | 3 | – | 8 |
# – BCS National Champion; $ – BCS representative as conference champion; Rankings from AP Poll

The 1999 NC State Wolfpack football team represented North Carolina State University during the 1999 NCAA Division I-A football season. The team's head coach was Mike O'Cain. NC State has been a member of the Atlantic Coast Conference (ACC) since the league's inception in 1953. The Wolfpack played its home games in 1999 at Carter–Finley Stadium in Raleigh, North Carolina, which has been NC State football's home stadium since 1966.

== Schedule ==
| Date | Time | Opponent | Rank | Site | TV | Result | Attendance | Source |
|---|---|---|---|---|---|---|---|---|
| August 28 | 8:30 pm | at No. 17 Texas* | | Darrell K Royal–Texas Memorial Stadium; Austin, TX (BCA Classic) | ESPN2 | W 23–20 | 82,582 | |
| September 4 | 7:30 pm | South Carolina* | No. 24 | Carter–Finley Stadium; Raleigh, NC | ESPN | W 10–0 | 51,500 | |
| September 11 | 7:00 pm | William & Mary* | No. 23 | Carter–Finley Stadium; Raleigh, NC | | W 38–9 | 42,386 | |
| September 18 | 3:30 pm | at No. 1 Florida State | No. 20 | Doak Campbell Stadium; Tallahassee, FL | ABC | L 11–42 | 80,040 | |
| September 25 | 12:00 pm | at Wake Forest | No. 25 | Groves Stadium; Winston-Salem, NC (rivalry) | JPS | L 7–31 | 23,450 | |
| October 9 | 8:00 pm | Clemson | | Carter–Finley Stadium; Raleigh, NC (Textile Bowl) | ESPN2 | W 35–31 | 48,790 | |
| October 16 | 3:30 pm | Virginia | | Carter–Finley Stadium; Raleigh, NC | ABC | L 26–47 | 49,507 | |
| October 23 | 12:00 pm | at Duke | | Wallace Wade Stadium; Durham, NC (rivalry) | JPS | W 31–24 ^{OT} | 26,179 | |
| October 30 | 3:30 pm | at No. 8 Georgia Tech | | Bobby Dodd Stadium; Atlanta, GA | ABC | L 21–48 | 46,012 | |
| November 6 | 12:00 pm | Maryland | | Carter–Finley Stadium; Raleigh, NC | JPS | W 30–17 | 47,211 | |
| November 11 | 8:00 pm | vs. North Carolina | | Ericsson Stadium; Charlotte, NC (rivalry) | ESPN | L 6–10 | 41,159 | |
| November 20 | 12:00 pm | at No. 21 East Carolina* | | Dowdy–Ficklen Stadium; Greenville, NC (rivalry) | | L 6–23 | 50,092 | |
*Non-conference game; Rankings from AP Poll released prior to the game; All times are in Eastern time

== Rankings ==
Ranking movements Legend: ██ Increase in ranking ██ Decrease in ranking — = Not ranked RV = Received votes
| | Week | | | | | | | | | | | | | | | | |
| Poll | Pre | 1 | 2 | 3 | 4 | 5 | 6 | 7 | 8 | 9 | 10 | 11 | 12 | 13 | 14 | 15 | Final |
|---|---|---|---|---|---|---|---|---|---|---|---|---|---|---|---|---|---|
| AP | RV | 24 | 23 | 20 | 25 | — | — | — | — | — | — | — | — | — | — | — | — |
| Coaches Poll | RV | RV* | 24 | 20 | 24 | — | — | — | — | — | — | — | — | — | — | — | — |
| BCS | Not released | | | | | | | | | — | — | — | — | — | — | — | Not released |
