= 1999 Clemson Tigers football team =

American college football season

1999 Clemson Tigers football

Peach Bowl, L 7–17 vs. Mississippi State
- Conference: Atlantic Coast Conference
- Record: 6–6 (5–3 ACC)
- Head coach: Tommy Bowden (1st season)
- Offensive coordinator: Rich Rodriguez (1st season)
- Offensive scheme: Spread option
- Defensive coordinator: Reggie Herring (1st season)
- Base defense: 4–3
- Captains: Keith Adams; Ryan Romano; Brandon Streeter
- Home stadium: Memorial Stadium

1999 Atlantic Coast Conference football standings
	Conf.			Overall
Team	W		L	W		L
No. 1 Florida State $#	8	–	0	12	–	0
No. 17 Georgia Tech	5	–	3	8	–	4
Virginia	5	–	3	7	–	5
Clemson	5	–	3	6	–	6
Wake Forest	3	–	5	7	–	5
NC State	3	–	5	6	–	6
Duke	3	–	5	3	–	8
Maryland	2	–	6	5	–	6
North Carolina	2	–	6	3	–	8
# – BCS National Champion; $ – BCS representative as conference champion; Rankings from AP Poll

The 1999 Clemson Tigers football team represented Clemson University as a member of the Atlantic Coast Conference (ACC) during the 1999 NCAA Division I-A football season. Led by first-year head coach Tommy Bowden, the Tigers compiled an overall record of 6–6 with a mark of 5–3 in conference play, placing in a three-way tie for second in the ACC. Clemson was invited to the Peach Bowl, where the Tigers lost to Mississippi State. The team played home games at Memorial Stadium in Clemson, South Carolina.

== Schedule ==
Date	Time	Opponent	Site	TV	Result	Attendance	Source
September 4	6:00 p.m.	Marshall*	Memorial Stadium; Clemson, SC		L 10–13	79,186	
September 11	3:30 p.m.	No. 22 Virginia	Memorial Stadium; Clemson, SC	ABC	W 33–14	66,922	
September 23	8:00 p.m.	at No. 8 Virginia Tech*	Lane Stadium; Blacksburg, VA	ESPN	L 11–31	51,907	
October 2	3:30 p.m.	North Carolina	Memorial Stadium; Clemson, SC	ABC	W 31–20	81,737	
October 9	8:00 p.m.	at NC State	Carter–Finley Stadium; Raleigh, NC (Textile Bowl)	ESPN2	L 31–35	48,790	
October 16	1:00 p.m.	at Maryland	Byrd Stadium; College Park, MD		W 42–30	34,097	
October 23	7:00 p.m.	No. 1 Florida State	Memorial Stadium; Clemson, SC (rivalry)	ESPN	L 14–17	86,092	
October 30	12:00 p.m.	at Wake Forest	Groves Stadium; Winston-Salem, NC	JPS	W 12–3	21,105	
November 6	1:00 p.m.	Duke	Memorial Stadium; Clemson, SC		W 58–7	77,573	
November 13	12:00 p.m.	at No. 13 Georgia Tech	Bobby Dodd Stadium; Atlanta, GA (rivalry)	JPS	L 42–45	46,085	
November 20	12:30 p.m.	at South Carolina*	Williams–Brice Stadium; Columbia, SC (rivalry)	JPS	W 31–21	83,523	
December 30	7:30 p.m.	vs. Mississippi State*	Georgia Dome; Atlanta, GA (Peach Bowl)	ESPN	L 7-17	73,315	
*Non-conference game; Rankings from AP Poll released prior to the game; All times are in Eastern time

== Roster ==
1999 Clemson Tigers football team roster
Players
Coaches
Offense

Pos.	#	Name	Class
QB	1	Woodrow Dantzler	So
RB	5	Javis Austin	Jr
WR	6	Justin Watts	Jr
QB	7	Willie Simmons	Fr
TB	8	Travis Zachery	So
RB	10	Chad Jasmin	Fr
FB	13	Pat Cyrgalis	Fr
QB	14	Brandon Streeter	Sr
QB	15	Matt Schell	Fr
WR	16	Joe Don Reames	Fr
WR	17	Kevin Youngblood	Fr
WR	19	Waymon White	So
RB	20	Bernard Rambert	Fr
TB	22	Gary Johnson	Fr
WR	23	Rod Gardner	Jr
WR	25	Brian Wofford	Sr
RB	26	Terry Witherspoon	Sr
WR	29	Torrance White	So
RB	36	Vince Ciurciu	So
WR	37	Marvis Jenkins	Fr
G	50	Will Merritt	So
C/LS	52	Brian Outlaw	Jr
C/LS	59	Kyle Young	So
G	60	Theo Mougros	Jr
OT	61	Akil Smith	So
G	62	Neely Page	So
OT	67	John McDermott	Jr
OL	68	Jermyn Chester	Fr
OL	70	William Henry	Fr
OT	72	David Haselden	Fr
OL	74	Nick Black	Fr
OT	75	Nathan Gillespie	Fr
OT	77	Brady Washburn	Fr
OL	78	Greg Walker	Fr
G	79	Gary Byrd	Fr
WR	80	Matt Bailey	So
WR	81	Mike Seth	Jr
WR	82	Jackie Robinson	Fr
TE	83	Morgan Woodward	Jr
WR	84	Mal Lawyer	Sr
WR	85	Jeff Scott	Fr
WR	87	Jason Stockunas	Sr
TE/LS	88	T.J. Watkins	So
TE	89	Jason LeMay	Fr

Defense

Pos.	#	Name	Class
SS	2	Eric Meekins	Fr
DB	3	Brian Mance	Fr
FS	9	Robert Carswell	Jr
DB	11	Charles Harper	Fr
SS	12	DoMarco Fox	Sr
DB	21	Marcus Houskin	Fr
DB	27	Kevin Johnson	Fr
CB	28	Alex Ardley	So
CB	30	Darrel Crutchfield	Jr
FS	31	Chad Speck	Jr
LB	32	J.J. McKelvey	Fr
CB	33	David Evans	Sr
CB	34	Dextra Polite	Sr
DT	35	Damonte McKenzie	Sr
SS	40	Charles Hafley	So
LB	41	Rodney Thomas	Fr
LB	42	Altroy Bodrick	So
LB	43	Keith Adams	So
LB	44	David Ellis	Fr
LB	45	Harold Means	Sr
LB	46	Chad Carson	So
LB	47	Rodney Feaster	Fr
LB	48	Braxton K. Williams	So
LB	49	Kenzi Ross	Jr
LB	53	Travis Roberts	Fr
LB	55	Darius Rapley	Sr
LB	56	Khaleed Vaughn	Fr
DE	57	Marcus Lewis	Fr
DE	58	Jerald Howard	Fr
DE	76	Jason Holloman	Jr
DE	86	Nick Eason	Fr
DT	90	Freddie James	Jr
DE	91	Bryant McNeal	Fr
DT	92	Terry Jolly	Jr
DE	93	Terry Bryant	Jr
DT	94	Paul White Jr.	Fr
DT	95	Jovon Bush	So
DT	96	Brandon Rouse	Fr
DE	97	DeJuan Polk	Fr
DT	98	Gerald Robinson	Fr
DE	99	Gary Childress	Jr

Special teams

Pos.	#	Name	Class
K	18	Tucker Hamrick	Sr
P/K	24	Jamie Somaini	Jr
K	38	Chris Campbell	Jr
P/K	38	Ryan Romero	Jr
P/K	39	Tony Lazzara	Fr
LS	63	Henry Owen	So

Head coach

- Tommy Bowden

Coordinators/assistant coaches

Legend

- (C) Team captain
- (S) Suspended
- (I) Ineligible
- Injured
- Redshirt

Roster
Last update: 1999-10-23
