= 1999 Duke Blue Devils football team =

American college football season

1999 Duke Blue Devils football
- Conference: Atlantic Coast Conference
- Record: 3–8 (3–5 ACC)
- Head coach: Carl Franks (1st season)
- Offensive scheme: Fun and gun
- Defensive coordinator: Bob Trott (4th season)
- Base defense: 4–3
- MVP: Scottie Montgomery
- Captains: Chris Combs; Eric Jones; Scottie Montgomery; Austin Smithwick
- Home stadium: Wallace Wade Stadium

1999 Atlantic Coast Conference football standings
	Conf.			Overall
Team	W		L	W		L
No. 1 Florida State $#	8	–	0	12	–	0
No. 17 Georgia Tech	5	–	3	8	–	4
Virginia	5	–	3	7	–	5
Clemson	5	–	3	6	–	6
Wake Forest	3	–	5	7	–	5
NC State	3	–	5	6	–	6
Duke	3	–	5	3	–	8
Maryland	2	–	6	5	–	6
North Carolina	2	–	6	3	–	8
# – BCS National Champion; $ – BCS representative as conference champion; Rankings from AP Poll

The 1999 Duke Blue Devils football team represented Duke University as a member of the Atlantic Coast Conference (ACC) during the 1999 NCAA Division I-A football season. Led by first-year head coach Carl Franks, the Blue Devils compiled an overall record of 3–8 with a mark of 3–5 in conference play, placing in a three-way tie for fifth in the ACC. The team played home games at Wallace Wade Stadium in Durham, North Carolina.

== Schedule ==
Date	Time	Opponent	Site	TV	Result	Attendance	Source
September 11	3:30 pm	at East Carolina*	Dowdy–Ficklen Stadium; Greenville, NC	FSN	L 9–27	42,052	
September 18	12:00 pm	Northwestern*	Wallace Wade Stadium; Durham, NC	JPS	L 12–15 ^{OT}	18,720	
September 25	7:00 pm	Vanderbilt*^{†}	Wallace Wade Stadium; Durham, NC		L 14–31	20,483	
October 2	12:00 pm	vs. No. 1 Florida State	Alltel Stadium; Jacksonville, FL	JPS	L 23–51	37,310	
October 9	1:00 pm	at Virginia	Scott Stadium; Charlottesville, VA		W 24–17 ^{2OT}	43,600	
October 16	12:00 pm	No. 8 Georgia Tech	Wallace Wade Stadium; Durham, NC	JPS	L 31–38	16,648	
October 23	12:00 pm	NC State	Wallace Wade Stadium; Durham, NC (rivalry)	JPS	L 24–31 ^{OT}	26,179	
October 30	1:00 pm	at Maryland	Byrd Stadium; College Park, MD		W 25–22	30,222	
November 6	1:00 pm	at Clemson	Memorial Stadium; Clemson, SC		L 7–58	77,573	
November 13	1:00 pm	Wake Forest	Wallace Wade Stadium; Durham, NC (rivalry)		W 48–35	29,457	
November 20	12:00 pm	at North Carolina	Kenan Memorial Stadium; Chapel Hill, NC (Victory Bell)	JPS	L 0–38	35,000	
*Non-conference game; ^{†}Homecoming; Rankings from AP Poll released prior to the game; All times are in Eastern time

== Roster ==
1999 Duke Blue Devils football team roster
Players
Coaches
Offense

Pos.	#	Name	Class
C	71	Troy Andrew	Jr
FL	22	Richmond Flowers	Jr
G	79	Shawn Lynch	So
G	77	John Miller	So
WR	2	Scottie Montgomery	Jr
QB	7	Kevin Thompson	Sr

Defense

Pos.	#	Name	Class
SS	13	Darius Clark	Sr
DE	93	Chris Combs	Sr
LB	27	Kevin Lewis	Sr
LB	99	Brian McCormack	Sr
LB	50	Kurt Miller	Fr
DT	98	Gannon Shepherd	Sr

Special teams

Pos.	#	Name	Class

Head coach

- Carl Franks

Coordinators/assistant coaches

- Brad Sherrod
  (Linebackers coach)

Legend

- (C) Team captain
- (S) Suspended
- (I) Ineligible
- Injured
- Redshirt

Roster
Last update: 2003-05-01

== Team players in the NFL ==
Player	Position	Round	Pick	NFL club
Chris Combs	Defensive end	6	173	Pittsburgh Steelers
