= Kenny Kelly =

American baseball player (born 1979)

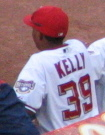
- Kelly with the Washington Nationals in 2005
- Outfielder
- Born: January 26, 1979 (age 47); Plant City, Florida, U.S.
- Batted: Right Threw: Right

MLB debut
- September 7, 2000, for the Tampa Bay Devil Rays

Last MLB appearance
- October 1, 2005, for the Washington Nationals

MLB statistics
- Batting average: .286
- Home runs: 0
- Runs batted in: 2
- Stats at Baseball Reference

Teams
- Tampa Bay Devil Rays (2000); Cincinnati Reds (2005); Washington Nationals (2005)

Kenneth Alphonso Kelly (born January 26, 1979) is an American former professional baseball outfielder who played in Major League Baseball for the Tampa Bay Devil Rays, Cincinnati Reds, and Washington Nationals. He had also been a quarterback for the University of Miami football team.

== Early life ==
Kelly was born in Plant City, Florida to Shirley, a guidance counselor, and Floyd Kelly, a football coach at Plant City High School and later an assistant principal. His older brothers played college football at Florida A&M and Grambling.

Kelly was able to dunk a basketball in eighth grade and received interest from college basketball recruiters as a child.

Kelly played baseball, football and basketball and ran track at Tampa Catholic High School in Tampa, Florida. As a sophomore, he helped the school to a state championship in basketball and broke a 25-year-old school record in the long jump.

As a junior baseball player, he hit .457 and led Tampa Catholic to a state championship. Prior to his senior baseball season, Baseball America ranked him the 20th-best high school prospect in the nation.

In his three seasons on the high school football field, he set state records in total yards and touchdowns. He was described in the Sun-Sentinel in 1997 as "the most prolific passer in the history of Florida high school football." He committed to play college football for the Miami Hurricanes.

== Football career ==
Kelly redshirted as a freshman at Miami in 1997. In 1998, he served as the primary backup quarterback to Scott Covington and threw for 433 yards and five touchdowns.

Kelly was named the starting quarterback ahead of the 1999 season. Due to his being named the starter, head coach Butch Davis was increasingly pressuring Kelly to focus exclusively on football. Kelly led the team to the number 19 ranking in the AP Poll until he was injured during a game against second-ranked Virginia Tech. Freshman backup quarterback Ken Dorsey excelled in Kelly's absence. When Kelly was cleared to return for the 2000 Gator Bowl, Butch Davis told him that, despite a stated policy that players could not lose their starting roles due to injury, Dorsey would be getting the start. Kelly ultimately led the Big East Conference in passing touchdowns and interceptions thrown despite having missed three full games.

Just over a month later, Kelly announced that he would be leaving Miami to focus on his baseball career due in part to the perceived financial security offered by a professional baseball career as well as his worsening relationship with Miami and Butch Davis.

== Baseball career ==
Kelly was selected in the second round of the 1997 Major League Baseball draft by the Tampa Bay Devil Rays. He signed with the Devil Rays for $450,000. He was assigned to the Gulf Coast League to start his professional career.

In February 2000, the Devil Rays restructured their agreement with Kelly and signed him to a four-year, $2.7 million contract to incentivize him to step away from football and focus on baseball. He began the season in Double-A with the Orlando Rays. Prior to the season, Baseball America had ranked him the 100th-best prospect in baseball. He spent the majority of the season in Double-A and led the Southern League in caught stealing with 21.

Kelly was called up to the Major Leagues for the first time early in September 2000, as required by his contract. He made his debut on September 7 against the Cleveland Indians at Jacobs Field as a pinch runner for Aubrey Huff. He appeared in only one more game that season as a pinch hitter.

On April 4, 2001, the Seattle Mariners purchased Kelly's contract from the Devil Rays, a move necessitated by the club's financial straits; the Devil Rays at the time owed him $1 million. Kelly spent the following two seasons in Seattle's farm system. Prior to the 2002 season, Kelly was described in the Seattle Post-Intelligencer as the Mariners' best outfield prospect. Nonetheless, Kelly failed to reach the Major Leagues with the Mariners and was removed from the 40-man roster following the 2002 season. Seattle re-signed Kelly to a minor league contract in 2003 but sent him at the trade deadline to the New York Mets in exchange for Rey Sanchez.

Kelly finished the 2003 season in Triple-A with the Norfolk Tides. In 2004, he was invited to Major League spring training with the Mets who still considered him a prospect. The Mets nonetheless released Kelly on April 3, 2004. He was picked up by the Cincinnati Reds three days later. Kelly spent the season in Cincinnati's farm system. In November 2004, the club re-signed him to a minor league contract.

On June 12, 2004, Kelly appeared in a Major League game for the first time in nearly five years. In the same game, he recorded his first Major League hit, driving in Ken Griffey Jr. and Adam Dunn with a single against Todd Williams of the Baltimore Orioles. He appeared in five more games with the Reds before undergoing arthroscopic knee surgery to repair a torn meniscus. He was activated from the disabled list on July 14, 2005, and appeared in one more game with the Reds.

On July 20, 2005, the Washington Nationals claimed him off waivers from the Reds. On September 2, 2005, the Nationals called him up to the majors. Kelly finished the season on the roster and appeared in what would be the final 17 games of his Major League career.

He spent the 2006 and 2007 seasons, his final in professional baseball, in Triple-A with the New Orleans Zephyrs and Charlotte Knights.

== Personal life ==
Kelly's first child, a daughter named Jeneisha, was born when Kelly was only 16 years old. In 1999, he was paying child support in the amount of $800 per month. By the time he left Miami, he had two children and was married. In 2002, Kelly married Adrian McPherson's first cousin once removed. As of February 2004, he had three children.

After being drafted by the Devil Rays, Kelly bought himself a 1985 Buick Regal with a VCR and monitor in the dashboard. He later bought a 2000 BMW 328i.

In 2001, Kelly started So Serious Records, a hip hop record label.

Kelly received a degree in finance from Alabama State University in 2010 and got a job with Merrill Lynch. Kelly also served as an assistant coach with Alabama State's baseball team while attending classes.

In June 2018, Kelly made his debut as a professional jai alai player. At the same time, he was serving as a part-time assistant football coach at Florida International University.

Kelly has worked as a color analyst for college football broadcasts.

Kelly has a tattoo on his arm of a Miami Hurricanes logo including Sebastian the Ibis.
