= 1999 North Carolina Tar Heels football team =

American college football season

1999 North Carolina Tar Heels football
- Conference: Atlantic Coast Conference
- Record: 3–8 (2–6 ACC)
- Head coach: Carl Torbush (2nd season)
- Offensive coordinator: Darrell Moody (2nd season)
- Offensive scheme: Pro-style
- Base defense: 4–3
- Captains: Ryan Carfley; Deon Dyer; Billy-Dee Greenwood; Brian Schmitz
- Home stadium: Kenan Memorial Stadium

1999 Atlantic Coast Conference football standings
	Conf.			Overall
Team	W		L	W		L
No. 1 Florida State $#	8	–	0	12	–	0
No. 17 Georgia Tech	5	–	3	8	–	4
Virginia	5	–	3	7	–	5
Clemson	5	–	3	6	–	6
Wake Forest	3	–	5	7	–	5
NC State	3	–	5	6	–	6
Duke	3	–	5	3	–	8
Maryland	2	–	6	5	–	6
North Carolina	2	–	6	3	–	8
# – BCS National Champion; $ – BCS representative as conference champion; Rankings from AP Poll

The 1999 North Carolina Tar Heels football team represented the University of North Carolina at Chapel Hill during the 1999 NCAA Division I-A football season. The Tar Heels played their home games at Kenan Memorial Stadium in Chapel Hill, North Carolina and competed in the Atlantic Coast Conference. The team was led by head coach Carl Torbush.

== Schedule ==
Date	Time	Opponent	Site	TV	Result	Attendance	Source
September 4	12:00 p.m.	No. 23 Virginia	Kenan Memorial Stadium; Chapel Hill, NC (South's Oldest Rivalry)	ABC	L 17–20	59,000	
September 11	6:00 p.m.	at Indiana*	Memorial Stadium; Bloomington, IN		W 42–30	30,245	
September 25	3:30 p.m.	No. 1 Florida State	Kenan Memorial Stadium; Chapel Hill, NC	ABC	L 10–42	60,000	
October 2	3:30 p.m.	at Clemson	Memorial Stadium; Clemson, SC	ABC	L 20–31	81,737	
October 9	3:30 p.m.	at No. 7 Georgia Tech	Bobby Dodd Stadium; Atlanta, GA	ABC	L 24–31 ^{OT}	46,110	
October 16	1:30 p.m.	Houston*	Kenan Memorial Stadium; Chapel Hill, NC		L 12–20	38,000	
October 23	3:30 p.m.	at Maryland	Byrd Stadium; College Park, MD	ABC	L 7–45	27,077	
October 30	1:30 p.m.	Furman*	Kenan Memorial Stadium; Chapel Hill, NC		L 3–28	33,000	
November 6	1:30 p.m.	Wake Forest^{†}	Kenan Memorial Stadium; Chapel Hill, NC (rivalry)		L 3–19	40,000	
November 11	8:00 p.m.	vs. NC State	Ericsson Stadium; Charlotte, NC (rivalry)	ESPN	W 10–6	41,159	
November 20	12:00 p.m.	Duke	Kenan Memorial Stadium; Chapel Hill, NC (Victory Bell)	JPS	W 38–0	35,000	
*Non-conference game; ^{†}Homecoming; Rankings from AP Poll released prior to the game; All times are in Eastern time

== Roster ==
1999 North Carolina Tar Heels football team roster
Players
Coaches
Offense

Pos.	#	Name	Class
QB	1	Ronald Curry	So
WR	6	Danny Davis	So
WR	8	Jamal Jones	Fr
QB	9	Luke Huard	Fr
QB	16	Bill Bigham	Jr
FB	38	Deon Dyer	Sr
TE	82	Alge Crumpler	Jr
WR	88	Sam Aiken	Fr

Defense

Pos.	#	Name	Class
CB	11	Anthony Anderson	So
CB	27	Jason Horton	Fr
LB	30	David Thornton	So
LB	41	Quincy Monk	So
LB	44	Brandon Spoon	Sr
DE	49	Julius Peppers	Fr
DT	87	Ryan Sims	So

Special teams

Pos.	#	Name	Class
K	92	Jeff Reed	Jr

Head coach

- Carl Torbush

Coordinators/assistant coaches

Legend

- (C) Team captain
- (S) Suspended
- (I) Ineligible
- Injured
- Redshirt

Roster
