= 1999 Aloha Bowl =

American college football game

1999 Jeep Aloha Bowl
Wake Forest Demon Deacons	Arizona State Sun Devils
(6–5)	(6–5)
23	3
Head coach: Jim Caldwell	Head coach: Bruce Snyder
AP / Coaches; NR / NR	AP / Coaches; NR / NR
	1	2	3	4	Total
Wake Forest	3	0	10	10	23
Arizona State	0	3	0	0	3
- Date: December 25, 1999
- Season: 1999
- Stadium: Aloha Stadium
- Location: Honolulu, Hawaii
- MVP: Ben Sankey
- Referee: Jim Lapetina (Big Ten)
- Halftime show: School marching bands
- Attendance: 40,974

United States TV coverage
- Network: ABC
- Announcers: Tim Brant, Dean Blevins, Leslie Gudel

The 1999 Aloha Bowl was a college football bowl game played December 25, 1999, in Honolulu, Hawaii. It was part of the 1999 NCAA Division I-A football season. It featured the Wake Forest Demon Deacons, who finished 5th in the ACC, and the Arizona State Sun Devils, who had finished 4th in the Pac-10 conference.

== Game summary ==
The game was a defensive struggle in the first half, with the two teams combining for 6 first half points, and 26 total points for the game. Wake Forest started the game with a great drive deep into Sun Devils territory, but had to settle for a 22-yard Matthew Burdick field goal, as Wake took a 3–0 lead.

In the second quarter, Arizona State's Mike Barth kicked a 46-yard field goal to tie the game at 3. The defenses held for the rest of the half, sending the game into halftime tied at 3. In the third quarter, Wake Forest put together another long drive, but again had to settle for a field goal, a 24 yarder from Burdick to put Wake Forest ahead 6–3.

Arizona State's Mike Barth missed a 42-yard field goal attempt, and Wake Forest made them pay. Wake Forest took full command of the game after Ben Sankey threw a 56-yard touchdown pass to Jimmy Caldwell giving Wake Forest a 13–3 lead. Early in the fourth quarter, running back Morgan Kane scored on a 1-yard touchdown run to increase the lead to 20–3. Matthew Burdick capped the scoring with a 43-yard field goal making the final score 23–3. This was Wake Forest's first bowl win since the 1992 season.

Arizona State was playing without its starting quarterback, who missed the game with a torn ACL. The team had many of its starters sick, which severely affected their performance, and the Sun Devils were held to just 164 yards of total offense.

In a slightly humorous note, the game was played on Christmas Day yet it pitted teams nicknamed the Sun Devils and Demon Deacons.

== Aftermath ==
Caldwell would leave the Deacons the following season, though the Deacons would play in the Seattle Bowl two years later. One year later, the Sun Devils would go to the Aloha Bowl and once again lose, this time to Boston College in Snyder's final season with the Sun Devils.
