= 1999 Arizona State Sun Devils football team =

American college football season

1999 Arizona State Sun Devils football

Aloha Bowl, L 3–23 vs. Wake Forest
- Conference: Pacific-10 Conference
- Record: 6–6 (5–3 Pac-10)
- Head coach: Bruce Snyder (8th season)
- Offensive coordinator: Dan Cozzetto (8th season)
- Defensive coordinator: Phil Snow (5th season)
- Home stadium: Sun Devil Stadium

1999 Pacific-10 Conference football standings
	Conf.			Overall
Team	W		L	W		L
Stanford $	7	–	1	8	–	4
No. 19 Oregon	6	–	2	9	–	3
Washington	6	–	2	7	–	5
Arizona State	5	–	3	6	–	6
Oregon State	4	–	4	7	–	5
Arizona	3	–	5	6	–	6
USC	3	–	5	6	–	6
California	3	–	5	4	–	7
UCLA	2	–	6	4	–	7
Washington State	1	–	7	3	–	9
$ – BCS representative as conference champion; Cal later vacated 4 wins (3 in conference) due to NCAA sanctions.; Rankings from AP Poll

The 1999 Arizona State Sun Devils football team represented Arizona State University as a member of the Pacific-10 Conference (Pac-10) during the 1999 NCAA Division I-A football season. In their eighth season under head coach Bruce Snyder, the Sun Devils compiled an overall record of 6–6 with a mark of 5–3 in conference play, placing fourth in the Pac-10. Arizona State was invited to the Aloha Bowl, where the Sun Devils lost to Wake Forest. The team played home games at Sun Devil Stadium in Tempe, Arizona.

== Schedule ==
Date	Time	Opponent	Rank	Site	TV	Result	Attendance
September 6	5:00 pm	Texas Tech*	No. 25	Sun Devil Stadium; Tempe, AZ	FSN	W 31–13	65,091
September 18	7:00 pm	New Mexico State*	No. 22	Sun Devil Stadium; Tempe, AZ		L 7–35	56,728
September 25	2:30 pm	at California		California Memorial Stadium; Berkeley, CA		L 23–24	44,500
October 2	12:30 pm	UCLA		Sun Devil Stadium; Tempe, AZ	ABC	W 28–27	54,048
October 9	11:30 am	at Notre Dame*		Notre Dame Stadium; Notre Dame, IN	NBC	L 17–48	80,012
October 16	4:00 pm	at Washington		Husky Stadium; Seattle, WA	ABC	W 28–7	72,789
October 23	4:00 pm	Washington State		Sun Devil Stadium; Tempe, AZ		W 33–21	57,537
October 30	3:30 pm	at Oregon		Autzen Stadium; Eugene, OR		L 17–20	45,445
November 6	3:30 pm	at USC		Los Angeles Memorial Coliseum; Los Angeles, CA	FSN	W 26–16	53,382
November 13	4:30 pm	Stanford^{†}		Sun Devil Stadium; Tempe, AZ	FSN	L 30–50	53,663
November 27	11:00 am	Arizona		Sun Devil Stadium; Tempe, AZ (rivalry)	ABC	W 42–27	68,102
December 25	1:30 pm	vs. Wake Forest*		Aloha Stadium; Halawa, HI (Aloha Bowl)	ABC	L 3–23	40,974
*Non-conference game; ^{†}Homecoming; Rankings from AP Poll released prior to the game; All times are in Mountain time

== Rankings ==
Ranking movements Legend: ██ Increase in ranking ██ Decrease in ranking — = Not ranked
	Week																
Poll	Pre	1	2	3	4	5	6	7	8	9	10	11	12	13	14	15	Final
AP	25	25	25	22	—	—	—	—	—	—	—	—	—	—	—	—	—
Coaches Poll	25	25*	25	23	—	—	—	—	—	—	—	—	—	—	—	—	—
BCS	Not released									—	—	—	—	—	—	—	Not released

== Roster ==
1999 Arizona State Sun Devils football team roster
Players
Coaches
Offense

Pos.	#	Name	Class
FB	1	Terrelle Smith	Sr
RB	21	J. R. Redmond	Sr
C	53	Scott Peters	So
G	69	Kyle Kosier	So
OT	71	Marvel Smith	Sr
G	75	Victor Leyva	Jr
OT	78	Levi Jones	So
TE	80	Todd Heap	Jr
WR	81	Shaun McDonald	Fr
TE	87	Brian Jennings	Sr

Defense

Pos.	#	Name	Class
DB	24	Nijrell Eason	Jr
LB	30	Stephen Trejo	Jr
DE	36	Erik Flowers	Sr
LB	40	Adam Archuleta	Jr
LB	41	Solomon Bates	Fr
CB	88	Phoenix Nash	Jr
LB	52	Mason Unck	Fr
DE	92	Junior Ioane	Sr

Special teams

Pos.	#	Name	Class
P	35	Nick Murphy	So

Head coach

- Bruce Snyder

Coordinators/assistant coaches

Legend

- (C) Team captain
- (S) Suspended
- (I) Ineligible
- Injured
- Redshirt

Roster
Last update: 2000-01-17
