= 1999 Wake Forest Demon Deacons football team =

American college football season

1999 Wake Forest Demon Deacons football

Aloha Bowl champion

1999 Aloha Bowl, W 23–3 vs. Arizona State
- Conference: Atlantic Coast Conference
- Record: 7–5 (3–5 ACC)
- Head coach: Jim Caldwell (7th season)
- Co-offensive coordinators: George Belu (1st season); Jamie Barresi (1st season)
- Offensive scheme: Pro-style
- Defensive coordinator: James Bell (3rd season)
- Base defense: 4–3
- Captains: Jammie Deese; Dustin Lyman; DaLawn Parrish; Ben Sankey
- Home stadium: Groves Stadium

1999 Atlantic Coast Conference football standings
	Conf.			Overall
Team	W		L	W		L
No. 1 Florida State $#	8	–	0	12	–	0
No. 17 Georgia Tech	5	–	3	8	–	4
Virginia	5	–	3	7	–	5
Clemson	5	–	3	6	–	6
Wake Forest	3	–	5	7	–	5
NC State	3	–	5	6	–	6
Duke	3	–	5	3	–	8
Maryland	2	–	6	5	–	6
North Carolina	2	–	6	3	–	8
# – BCS National Champion; $ – BCS representative as conference champion; Rankings from AP Poll

The 1999 Wake Forest Demon Deacons football team was an American football team that represented Wake Forest University during the 1999 NCAA Division I-A football season. In their seventh season under head coach Jim Caldwell, the Demon Deacons compiled a 7–5 record, finished in a three-way tie for fifth place in the Atlantic Coast Conference, and defeated Arizona State in the 1999 Aloha Bowl.

== Schedule ==
Date	Time	Opponent	Site	TV	Result	Attendance	Source
September 11	12:00 pm	at Army*	Michie Stadium; West Point, NY	FSN	W 34–15	29,646	
September 18	7:00 pm	at Virginia	Scott Stadium; Charlottesville, VA	ESPN2	L 7–35	50,000	
September 25	12:00 pm	No. 25 NC State	Groves Stadium; Winston-Salem, NC (rivalry)	JPS	W 31–7	23,450	
October 2	6:30 pm	Rutgers*	Groves Stadium; Winston-Salem, NC		W 17–10	20,772	
October 9	12:00 pm	Maryland	Groves Stadium; Winston-Salem, NC	JPS	L 14–17	19,321	
October 16	7:00 pm	at No. 1 Florida State	Doak Campbell Stadium; Tallahassee, FL		L 10–33	78,105	
October 23	3:30 pm	UAB*^{†}	Groves Stadium; Winston-Salem, NC		W 47–3	20,578	
October 30	12:00 pm	Clemson	Groves Stadium; Winston-Salem, NC	JPS	L 3–12	21,105	
November 6	1:30 pm	at North Carolina	Kenan Memorial Stadium; Chapel Hill, NC (rivalry)		W 19–3	40,000	
November 13	1:30 pm	at Duke	Wallace Wade Stadium; Durham, NC (rivalry)		L 35–48	29,457	
November 20	3:30 pm	No. 14 Georgia Tech	Groves Stadium; Winston-Salem, NC		W 26–23	25,230	
December 25	3:30 pm	vs. Arizona State*	Aloha Stadium; Halawa, HI (Aloha Bowl)	ABC	W 23–3	40,974	
*Non-conference game; ^{†}Homecoming; Rankings from AP Poll released prior to the game; All times are in Eastern time

== Roster ==
1999 Wake Forest Demon Deacons football team roster
Players
Coaches
Offense

Pos.	#	Name	Class
QB	13	Ben Sankey	Sr
WR	21	Jammie Deese	Sr

Defense

Pos.	#	Name	Class
LB	43	Dustin Lyman	Sr
DT	90	Fred Robbins	Sr

Special teams

Pos.	#	Name	Class

Head coach

- Jim Caldwell

Coordinators/assistant coaches

Legend

- (C) Team captain
- (S) Suspended
- (I) Ineligible
- Injured
- Redshirt

Roster

== Team leaders ==
Category	Team Leader	Att/Cth	Yds
Passing	Ben Sankey	133/224	1,496
Rushing	Morgan Kane	275	1,161
Receiving	Jammie Deese	32	444
