= 1999 MicronPC.com Bowl =

American college football game

Illinois Fighting Illini	Virginia Cavaliers
(7–4)	(7–4)
Big Ten	ACC
63	21
Head coach: Ron Turner	Head coach: George Welsh
	1	2	3	4	Total
Illinois	14	28	7	14	63
Virginia	7	0	7	7	21
- Date: December 30, 1999
- Season: 1999
- Stadium: Pro Player Stadium
- Location: Miami Gardens, Florida
- MVP: QB Kurt Kittner (Illinois)
- Referee: Bill Alge (MAC)
- Attendance: 31,089

United States TV coverage
- Network: TBS
- Announcers: Kevin Harlan (play-by-play), Trev Alberts, Sam Wyche (analysts), and Craig Sager (sideline)

The 1999 MicronPC.com Bowl was a post-season American college football bowl game at Pro Player Stadium in Miami Gardens, Florida, between the Illinois Fighting Illini and the Virginia Cavaliers on December 30, 1999. This was the tenth edition of what had originally been the Blockbuster Bowl, and second year of sponsorship by MicronPC.

The game was the final contest of the 1999 NCAA Division I-A football season for both teams, and ended in a 63–21 victory for Illinois. Illinois and Virginia had previously met in the postseason at the 1990 Florida Citrus Bowl, also won by Illinois, 31–21.

== Game summary ==
The Illini took advantage of the school's first bowl appearance in five years with an impressive 63–21 victory over highly touted running back Thomas Jones and the Virginia Cavaliers. In a game which pitted two evenly matched, 7–4 squads, the Illini dominated with 611 yards total offense and nine touchdowns. On the first drive of the game, Kurt Kittner led the Illini down field 71 yards and scored on a one-yard run. The Illini then rattled off 35 unanswered points, including a flea-flicker pass from wide receiver Brandon Lloyd to Kittner for 30 yards and a halftime score of 42–7. Kittner threw a school record 24th touchdown pass on a one-yard reception to Jameel Cook. The Illini broke 22 Illinois and Micronpc.com Bowl records that night and scored the second-most points in collegiate bowl history.

== Scoring summary ==
Quarter	Team	Scoring summary	Score	
Quarter	Team	Scoring summary	Illinois	Virginia
1	Illinois	1-yard touchdown run by Kurt Kittner, kick by Neil Rackers good	7	0
1	Virginia	7-yard touchdown run by Thomas Jones, kick by Todd Braverman good	7	7
1	Illinois	47-yard touchdown run by Rocky Harvey, kick by Neil Rackers good	14	7
2	Illinois	30-yard touchdown reception by Kurt Kittner from Brandon Lloyd, kick by Neil Rackers good	21	7
2	Illinois	61-yard touchdown reception by Jameel Cook from Kurt Kittner, kick by Neil Rackers good	28	7
2	Illinois	2-yard touchdown run by Steve Havard, kick by Neil Rackers good	35	7
2	Illinois	1-yard touchdown reception by Jameel Cook from Kurt Kittner, kick by Neil Rackers good	42	7
3	Virginia	5-yard touchdown reception by Kevin Coffey from Dan Ellis, kick by Todd Braverman good	42	14
3	Illinois	2-yard touchdown run by Steve Havard, kick by Neil Rackers good	49	14
4	Illinois	9-yard touchdown run by Rocky Harvey, kick by Neil Rackers good	56	14
4	Illinois	1-yard touchdown run by Kirk Johnson, kick by Neil Rackers good	63	14
4	Virginia	55-yard touchdown reception by Will Thompson from David Rivers, kick by Todd Braverman good	63	21
			63	21

== Statistical summary ==
Team Statistics

(Rushing-Passing-Total): UI - 325-286-611; UVA - 172-208-380.

Individual Statistical Leaders

Rushing (Att.-Yds.-TD): UI—Harvey 10-122-2; Havard 15-75-2; Kittner 4-11-1; Johnson 3-5-1; UVA—Jones 23-110-1.

Passing (Att.-Comp.-Int.-TD-Yds.): UI—Kittner 24-14-1-2-254; UVA - Ellis 32-15-1-1-146.

Receiving (No.-Yds.-TD): UI—Cook 4-88-2, Lloyd 3-57-0, Dean 2-42-0, Young 1-31-0, Kittner 1-30-1; UVA—Jones 5-31-0, McMullen 3-31-0.
