= 1999 Maryland Terrapins football team =

American college football season

1999 Maryland Terrapins football
- Conference: Atlantic Coast Conference
- Record: 5–6 (2–6 ACC)
- Head coach: Ron Vanderlinden (3rd season)
- Offensive coordinator: Bob Heffner (1st season)
- Defensive coordinator: Wally Ake (3rd season)
- Home stadium: Byrd Stadium

1999 Atlantic Coast Conference football standings
	Conf.			Overall
Team	W		L	W		L
No. 1 Florida State $#	8	–	0	12	–	0
No. 17 Georgia Tech	5	–	3	8	–	4
Virginia	5	–	3	7	–	5
Clemson	5	–	3	6	–	6
Wake Forest	3	–	5	7	–	5
NC State	3	–	5	6	–	6
Duke	3	–	5	3	–	8
Maryland	2	–	6	5	–	6
North Carolina	2	–	6	3	–	8
# – BCS National Champion; $ – BCS representative as conference champion; Rankings from AP Poll

The 1999 Maryland Terrapins football team represented the University of Maryland in the 1999 NCAA Division I-A football season. In their third season under head coach Ron Vanderlinden, the Terrapins compiled a 5–6 record, finished in eighth place in the Atlantic Coast Conference, and outscored their opponents 292 to 260. The team's statistical leaders included Calvin McCall with 1,264 passing yards, LaMont Jordan with 1,632 rushing yards, and Jermaine Arrington with 302 receiving yards.

== Schedule ==
Date	Time	Opponent	Site	TV	Result	Attendance	Source
September 2	6:00 p.m.	at Temple*	Veterans Stadium; Philadelphia, PA		W 6–0	25,322	
September 11		Western Carolina*	Byrd Stadium; College Park, MD		W 51–10	36,376	
September 18	12:00 p.m.	West Virginia*	Byrd Stadium; College Park, MD (rivalry)	ESPN2	W 33–0	43,799	
September 30	8:00 p.m.	at No. 9 Georgia Tech	Bobby Dodd Stadium; Atlanta, GA	ESPN	L 31–49	44,612	
October 9	12:00 p.m.	at Wake Forest	Groves Stadium; Winston-Salem, NC	JPS	W 17–14	19,321	
October 16	1:00 p.m.	Clemson	Byrd Stadium; College Park, MD		L 30–42	34,097	
October 23	3:30 p.m.	North Carolina	Byrd Stadium; College Park, MD	ABC	W 45–7	27,077	
October 30	1:00 p.m.	Duke	Byrd Stadium; College Park, MD		L 22–25	30,222	
November 6	12:00 p.m.	at NC State	Carter–Finley Stadium; Raleigh, NC	JPS	L 17–30	47,211	
November 13	3:30 p.m.	at No. 1 Florida State	Doak Campbell Stadium; Tallahassee, FL	ABC	L 10–49	80,340	
November 20	12:00 p.m.	Virginia	Byrd Stadium; College Park, MD (rivalry)	JPS	L 30–34	32,334	
*Non-conference game; Rankings from AP Poll released prior to the game; All times are in Eastern time

== Roster ==
1999 Maryland Terrapins football team roster
Players
Coaches
Offense

Pos.	#	Name	Class
WR	3	Omar Cheeseboro	Jr
WR	81	Kevin Collins	Jr
OT	78	Matt Crawford	Fr
C	67	Melvin Fowler	So
WR	21	Guilian Gary	So
QB	14	Shaun Hill	So
RB	15	LaMont Jordan	Jr
FB	45	Matt Kalapinski	Jr
FB	31	Chad Killian	Fr
TE	88	Matt Murphy	So
TE	46	John Waerig	Sr

Defense

Pos.	#	Name	Class
DT	91	Delbert Cowsette	Sr
CB	30	Curome Cox	Fr
DB	20	Renard Cox	Sr
CB	19	Richard Harrigan	So
DB	28	Mohammad Emamhosseini	So
LB	42	E. J. Henderson	Fr
DT	98	Charles Hill	So
DT	57	Kris Jenkins	So
CB	11	Tony Okanlawon	So
CB	37	Lewis Sanders	Sr
SS	34	Madieu Williams	Fr

Special teams

Pos.	#	Name	Class
P	16	Brooks Barnard	Fr

Head coach

- Ron Vanderlinden

Coordinators/assistant coaches

Legend

- (C) Team captain
- (S) Suspended
- (I) Ineligible
- Injured
- Redshirt

Roster
