= Nick Maddox (American football) =

American football player (born 1980)

No. 26
- Position: Running back

Personal information
- Born: December 11, 1980 (age 45); Shelby, North Carolina, U.S.
- Listed height: 5 ft 11 in (1.80 m)
- Listed weight: 209 lb (95 kg)

Career information
- High school: A.L. Brown (Kannapolis, North Carolina)
- College: Florida State (1999–2002)
- NFL draft: 2003: undrafted

Career history
- San Diego Chargers (2003)*; Buffalo Bills (2003)*; Cleveland Browns (2003–2004); New Orleans Saints (2004)*; Carolina Panthers (2004–2005)*
- * Offseason or practice squad member only

Awards and highlights
- BCS national champion (1999)

Career NFL statistics
- Games played: 1
- Return yards: 58
- Stats at Pro Football Reference

Nicholas J. Maddox (born December 11, 1980) is an American county commissioner and former professional football running back who played in the National Football League (NFL) for the Cleveland Browns. He played college football for the Florida State Seminoles. Maddox also had stints with the San Diego Chargers, Buffalo Bills, New Orleans Saints and Carolina Panthers.

== Early life ==
Maddox was born on December 11, 1980, in Shelby, North Carolina. He attended A.L. Brown High School in Kannapolis, North Carolina, where he played football, basketball and track. As a senior, Maddox rushed for 2,536 yards and 33 touchdowns and had 20 catches for 268 yards and eight scores. He totaled 6,624 rushing yards and 114 touchdowns in his career and earned Parade All-American and first-team USA Today All-USA honors. Maddox committed to play college football at Florida State University, choosing the Seminoles over Florida, Georgia, North Carolina, Notre Dame and Tennessee.

== College career ==
Maddox played college football for the Florida State Seminoles from 1999 to 2002. He played in 45 games as a running back and wide receiver, recording 1,221 rushing yards, seven rushing touchdowns, 61 receptions for 628 yards and three touchdowns.

== Professional career ==
Pre-draft measurables
Height	Weight	Arm length	Hand span	40-yard dash	10-yard split	20-yard split	20-yard shuttle	Three-cone drill	Vertical jump	Broad jump	Bench press
5 ft 11 in (1.80 m)	211 lb (96 kg)	31 in (0.79 m)	8 3/4 in (0.22 m)	4.70 s	1.65 s	2.74 s	4.50 s	7.33 s	33.5 in (0.85 m)	9 ft 7 in (2.92 m)	18 reps
All values from NFL Combine

=== San Diego Chargers ===
After going undrafted in the 2003 NFL draft, Maddox signed with the San Diego Chargers as an undrafted free agent. On August 26, he was waived by the team.

=== Buffalo Bills ===
On September 24, 2003, Maddox was signed by the Buffalo Bills to the practice squad. On November 19, he was released. On November 26, Maddox was re-signed to the practice squad. On December 10, he was released again.

=== Cleveland Browns ===
Om December 10, 2003, Maddox was signed by the Cleveland Browns. He was active for the final game against the Cincinnati Bengals, where he returned three kickoffs for 58 yards and fumbled once. On September 5, 2004, Maddox was released by the team.

=== New Orleans Saints ===
On September 22, 2004, Maddox was signed by the New Orleans Saints to the practice squad. On October 12, he was released.

=== Carolina Panthers ===
On October 14, 2004, the Carolina Panthers signed Maddox to the practice squad. On January 4, 2005, he signed a futures contract with the team. On August 28, Maddox was released by the team.

== Post-playing career ==
After retiring from professional football, Maddox entered politics in 2010 after was elected to the Leon County Board of County Commissioners. He has since served as the chairman of the board on three separate occasions.
