= Ben Sankey =

American gridiron football player (born 1976)

No. 17, 7
- Position: Quarterback

Personal information
- Born: December 5, 1976 (age 49); Chicago, Illinois, U.S.
- Listed height: 6 ft 3 in (1.91 m)
- Listed weight: 225 lb (102 kg)

Career information
- High school: Whitney Young (Chicago)
- College: Wake Forest
- NFL draft: 2000: undrafted

Career history
- Calgary Stampeders (2000–2001); Houston Texans (2002)*; Calgary Stampeders (2002); Houston Texans (2003)*; Hamilton Tiger-Cats (2004); Tennessee Valley Raptors (2005); Rock River Raptors (2006); BC Lions (2007)*; Calgary Stampeders (2007–2008); Omaha Beef (2009–2010); Omaha Nighthawks (2010)*; Chicago Slaughter (2011); Wichita Wild (2011); Allen Wranglers (2012)
- * Offseason or practice squad member only

Awards and highlights
- 2× Grey Cup champion (2001, 2008); UIF MVP (2006); First-team All-IFL (2010); IFL Offensive Player of the Year (2010); Aloha Bowl MVP (1999)

Career CFL statistics
- Comp. / Att.: 208 / 328
- Passing yards: 2,818
- TD–INT: 22–9
- QB rating: 101.7
- Rushing TD: 361
- Stats at CFL.ca (archived)

Ben Sankey (born December 5, 1976) is an American former professional football quarterback. He was signed as a street free agent by the Calgary Stampeders in 2000. He played college football at Wake Forest.

Sankey also played for the Houston Texans, Hamilton Tiger-Cats, Tennessee Valley Raptors, Rock River Raptors, BC Lions, Omaha Beef, Omaha Nighthawks, Chicago Slaughter, Wichita Wild and Allen Wranglers.

== Early life ==
Sankey attended Chicago's Whitney Young Magnet High School where he excelled in football, basketball and baseball.

== College career ==
Sankey also attended Wake Forest University from 1996 to 1999. He played his first three years as Brian Kuklick's back-up, finally becoming the starter in 1999. He led the Demon Deacons to the Aloha Bowl, winning convincingly over Arizona State. He was named most valuable player in the game.

=== Statistics ===
Sankey's career statistics are as follows:

Wake Forest Demon Deacons
Season	Passing							Rushing			
Season	Comp	Att	Yards	Pct.	TD	Int	QB rating	Att	Yards	Avg	TD
1996	13	30	180	43.3	1	0	104.7	9	−4	−0.4	0
1997	54	93	606	58.1	1	5	105.6	46	−34	−0.7	2
1998	38	58	468	65.5	4	2	149.2	14	65	4.6	0
1999	133	224	1,496	59.4	9	9	120.7	150	405	2.7	5
Career	238	405	2,750	58.8	15	16	120.1	219	432	2.0	7

== Professional career ==
Sankey went undrafted in the 2000 NFL draft, and signed a contract with the CFL's Calgary Stampeders in 2000. He dressed for 16 games and did not see any playing time until the final game of the season against the Hamilton Tiger-Cats. He completed all four of his pass attempts.

In 2001, he was named the Stampeders' starting quarterback, however a sprained thumb caused him to miss several games. Marcus Crandell took over and led the Stampeders to their fifth Grey Cup championship. His play was promising enough for the Houston Texans of the National Football League to take interest in him: he was signed to a contract before the 2002 season.

He did not receive any playing time with the Texans, so he returned to the Stampeders later that season, playing in seven games.

He returned to the Texans in 2003, however he was relegated to the practice squad and saw no playing time. In 2004 he returned to the CFL, this time with the Hamilton Tiger-Cats, however, again, he saw no playing time. Discontent, he signed a contract with the Tennessee Valley Raptors of United Indoor Football in 2005. He returned to the franchise in 2006 after it had relocated to Rockford, Illinois, finishing the season with 47 touchdown passes. He was named the league's most valuable player.

He returned to the CFL with the British Columbia Lions under coach Wally Buono, who originally brought him to the CFL with the Stampeders seven years before. Again he saw no playing time, placed on the practice roster. The Stampeders were in need of a quarterback after Henry Burris fell to injury and Akili Smith and Barrick Nealy proved ineffective. He returned to the Stampeders in relief of Smith on October 8, in a game against the Saskatchewan Roughriders. He completed 19 of 25 passes for 262 yards and 2 touchdowns. In three appearances he threw for 818 yards and five touchdowns for a quarterback rating of 106.6.

He began the 2008 CFL season with the Stampeders but was sidelined with an injury. Upon recovering from his injury Sankey appeared to be the fourth quarterback on the Stampeders' depth chart and was released in July 2008. This did not last as Dave Dickenson was injured for the remainder of the season and Sankey was brought back to the Stampeders.

On May 4, 2009, Sankey was released by the Stampeders. He later signed with the Omaha Nighthawks of the United Football League in July 2010.

From August 2015 through May 2016 he was at Saint Ignatius College Prep in Chicago, Illinois working as Resident Physical Education Teacher until his disappearance in March 2016.
