= Donny Green =

American football player (born 1977)

No. 54, 53
- Position: Linebacker

Personal information
- Born: September 18, 1977 (age 49); Jesup, Georgia, U.S.
- Listed height: 6 ft 2 in (1.88 m)
- Listed weight: 238 lb (108 kg)

Career information
- High school: Hampton (Hampton, Virginia)
- College: Virginia
- NFL draft: 2001: undrafted

Career history
- Buffalo Bills (2001)*; Washington Redskins (2001); Dallas Cowboys (2001)*; Jacksonville Jaguars (2001); San Diego Chargers (2002)*; Oakland Raiders (2003–2004)*; Atlanta Falcons (2005)*; Georgia Force (2008)
- * Offseason or practice squad member only

Career NFL statistics
- Games played: 2
- Games started: 0
- Stats at Pro Football Reference
- Stats at ArenaFan.com

Donny Jamal Green (born September 18, 1977) is an American former professional football player who was a linebacker in the National Football League (NFL). He played for the Washington Redskins and the Jacksonville Jaguars, and played college football for the Virginia Cavaliers.
