= 1999 Georgia Tech Yellow Jackets football team =

American college football season

1999 Georgia Tech Yellow Jackets football

Gator Bowl, L 13–28 vs. Miami (FL)
- Conference: Atlantic Coast Conference

Ranking
- Coaches: No. 21
- AP: No. 20
- Record: 8–4 (5–3 ACC)
- Head coach: George O'Leary (6th season)
- Offensive coordinator: Ralph Friedgen (8th season)
- Defensive coordinator: Ted Roof (1st season)
- Home stadium: Bobby Dodd Stadium

1999 Atlantic Coast Conference football standings
	Conf.			Overall
Team	W		L	W		L
No. 1 Florida State $#	8	–	0	12	–	0
No. 17 Georgia Tech	5	–	3	8	–	4
Virginia	5	–	3	7	–	5
Clemson	5	–	3	6	–	6
Wake Forest	3	–	5	7	–	5
NC State	3	–	5	6	–	6
Duke	3	–	5	3	–	8
Maryland	2	–	6	5	–	6
North Carolina	2	–	6	3	–	8
# – BCS National Champion; $ – BCS representative as conference champion; Rankings from AP Poll

The 1999 Georgia Tech Yellow Jackets football team represented Georgia Tech as member of the Atlantic Coast Conference (ACC) during the 1999 NCAA Division I-A football season. Led by sixth-year head coach George O'Leary, the Yellow Jackets compiled an overall record of 8–4 with a mark of 5–3 in conference play, placing in a three-way tie for second in the ACC. Georgia Tech was invited to the Gator Bowl, where the Yellow Jackets lost to the Miami Hurricanes. The team played home games at Bobby Dodd Stadium in Atlanta.

== Schedule ==
Date	Time	Opponent	Rank	Site	TV	Result	Attendance	Source
September 4	12:00 pm	at Navy*	No. 10	Navy–Marine Corps Memorial Stadium; Annapolis, MD	FSN	W 49–14	30,311	
September 11	8:00 pm	at No. 1 Florida State	No. 10	Doak Campbell Stadium; Tallahassee, FL	ABC	L 35–41	80,187	
September 18	7:00 pm	UCF*	No. 12	Bobby Dodd Stadium; Atlanta, GA		W 41–10	45,355	
September 30	8:00 pm	Maryland	No. 9	Bobby Dodd Stadium; Atlanta, GA	ESPN	W 49–31	44,612	
October 9	3:30 pm	North Carolina^{†}	No. 7	Bobby Dodd Stadium; Atlanta, GA	ABC	W 31–24 ^{OT}	46,110	
October 16	12:00 pm	at Duke	No. 8	Wallace Wade Stadium; Durham, NC	JPS	W 38–31	16,648	
October 30	3:30 pm	NC State	No. 7	Bobby Dodd Stadium; Atlanta, GA	ABC	W 27–17	46,012	
November 6	3:30 pm	at Virginia	No. 7	Scott Stadium; Charlottesville, VA	ABC	L 38–45	44,500	
November 13	3:30 pm	Clemson	No. 13	Bobby Dodd Stadium; Atlanta, GA (rivalry)	JPS	W 45–42	46,085	
November 20	3:30 pm	at Wake Forest	No. 14	Groves Stadium; Winston-Salem, NC		L 23–26	25,620	
November 27	1:00 pm	No. 16 Georgia*	No. 20	Bobby Dodd Stadium; Atlanta, GA (Clean, Old-Fashioned Hate)	ABC	W 51–48 ^{OT}	46,450	
January 1	4:00 pm	vs. No. 23 Miami (FL)*	No. 17	Alltel Stadium; Jacksonville, FL (Gator Bowl)	NBC	L 13–28	43,416	
*Non-conference game; ^{†}Homecoming; Rankings from AP Poll released prior to the game; All times are in Eastern time

== Rankings ==
Ranking movements Legend: ██ Increase in ranking ██ Decrease in ranking — = Not ranked
	Week																
Poll	Pre	1	2	3	4	5	6	7	8	9	10	11	12	13	14	15	Final
AP	11	10	10	12	10	9	7	8	8	7	7	13	14	20	17	17	20
Coaches Poll	11	11*	10	13	12	12	8	9	8	7	7	14	12	16	16	15	21
BCS	Not released									8	7	15	13	—	—	—	Not released
