= Washington State Cougars football statistical leaders =

The Washington State Cougars football statistical leaders are individual statistical leaders of the Washington State Cougars football program in various categories, including passing, rushing, receiving, total offense, defensive stats, and kicking. Within those areas, the lists identify single-game, Single season and career leaders. The Cougars represent Washington State University in the NCAA's Pac-12 Conference.

Although Washington State began competing in intercollegiate football in 1894, the school's official record book considers the "modern era" to have begun in 1951. Records from before this year are often incomplete and inconsistent, and they are generally not included in these lists.

These lists are dominated by more recent players for several reasons:

- Since 1950, seasons have increased from 10 games to 11 and then 12 games in length.
- The NCAA didn't allow freshmen to play varsity football until 1972 (with the exception of the World War II years), allowing players to have four-year careers.
- Bowl games only began counting toward single-season and career statistics in 2002. The Cougars have played in seven bowl games since this decision, giving players in those seasons an extra game to accumulate statistics.
- Since Mike Leach took over as head coach in 2012, the Cougars have run a high-octane air raid offense, allowing quarterbacks and wide receivers to rack up many yards and touchdowns. Most notable among these is Connor Halliday, who set an FBS single-game record (since tied) by passing for 734 yards in a 60–59 loss to California in 2014.
- Due to COVID-19 disruptions, the NCAA did not count the 2020 season against the eligibility of any football player, giving all players active in that season the chance for five years of eligibility instead of the standard four.

These lists are updated through the end of the 2025 season.

== Passing ==
=== Passing yards ===
Career
| Rank | Player | Yards | Years |
|---|---|---|---|
| 1 | Luke Falk^ | 14,481 | 2014 2015 2016 2017 |
| 2 | Connor Halliday | 11,308 | 2011 2012 2013 2014 |
| 3 | Alex Brink | 10,913 | 2004 2005 2006 2007 |
| 4 | Jason Gesser | 8,830 | 1999 2000 2001 2002 |
| 5 | Jack Thompson | 7,818 | 1975 1976 1977 1978 |
| 6 | Ryan Leaf | 7,433 | 1995 1996 1997 |
| 7 | Drew Bledsoe | 7,373 | 1990 1991 1992 |
| 8 | Cam Ward | 6,966 | 2022 2023 |
| 9 | Timm Rosenbach | 5,995 | 1986 1987 1988 |
| 10 | Jeff Tuel | 5,932 | 2009 2010 2011 2012 |

^ Indicates conference record holder for this statistic

Single season
| Rank | Player | Yards | Year |
|---|---|---|---|
| 1 | Anthony Gordon^ | 5,579 | 2019 |
| 2 | Gardner Minshew | 4,779 | 2018 |
| 3 | Connor Halliday | 4,597 | 2013 |
| 4 | Luke Falk | 4,561 | 2015 |
| 5 | Luke Falk | 4,468 | 2016 |
| 6 | Ryan Leaf | 3,968 | 1997 |
| 7 | Connor Halliday | 3,873 | 2014 |
| 8 | Alex Brink | 3,818 | 2007 |
| 9 | Cam Ward | 3,735 | 2023 |
| 10 | Luke Falk | 3,593 | 2017 |

Single game
| Rank | Player | Yards | Year | Opponent |
|---|---|---|---|---|
| 1 | Connor Halliday^^ | 734 | 2014 | California |
| 2 | Anthony Gordon | 606 | 2019 | Oregon State |
| 3 | Luke Falk | 601 | 2014 | Arizona State |
| 4 | Anthony Gordon | 570 | 2019 | UCLA |
| 5 | Connor Halliday | 557 | 2013 | Oregon |
| 6 | Connor Halliday | 544 | 2014 | Portland State |
| 7 | Connor Halliday | 532 | 2014 | Rutgers |
| 8 | Alex Brink | 531 | 2005 | Oregon State |
| 9 | Connor Halliday | 521 | 2013 | California |
| 10 | Anthony Gordon | 520 | 2019 | Stanford |

^^ Indicates NCAA record holder for this statistic

=== Passing touchdowns ===
Career
| Rank | Player | TDs | Years |
|---|---|---|---|
| 1 | Luke Falk^ | 119 | 2014 2015 2016 2017 |
| 2 | Connor Halliday | 90 | 2011 2012 2013 2014 |
| 3 | Alex Brink | 76 | 2004 2005 2006 2007 |
| 4 | Jason Gesser | 70 | 1999 2000 2001 2002 |
| 5 | Ryan Leaf | 59 | 1995 1996 1997 |
| 6 | Jack Thompson | 53 | 1975 1976 1977 1978 |
| 7 | Anthony Gordon | 48 | 2018 2019 |
| | Cam Ward | 48 | 2022 2023 |
| 9 | Drew Bledsoe | 46 | 1990 1991 1992 |
| 10 | Timm Rosenbach | 39 | 1986 1987 1988 |

^ Indicates conference record holder for this statistic

Single season
| Rank | Player | TDs | Year |
|---|---|---|---|
| 1 | Anthony Gordon^ | 48 | 2019 |
| 2 | Luke Falk | 38 | 2015 |
| | Luke Falk | 38 | 2016 |
| | Gardner Minshew | 38 | 2018 |
| 5 | Ryan Leaf | 34 | 1997 |
| | Connor Halliday | 34 | 2013 |
| 7 | Connor Halliday | 32 | 2014 |
| 8 | Luke Falk | 30 | 2017 |
| 9 | John Mateer | 29 | 2024 |
| 10 | Jason Gesser | 28 | 2002 |

Single game
| Rank | Player | TDs | Year | Opponent |
|---|---|---|---|---|
| 1 | Anthony Gordon | 9 | 2019 | UCLA |
| 2 | Gardner Minshew | 7 | 2018 | Arizona |
| 3 | Jason Gesser | 6 | 2000 | Arizona |
| | Connor Halliday | 6 | 2013 | Colorado State |
| | Connor Halliday | 6 | 2014 | Portland State |
| | Connor Halliday | 6 | 2014 | California |
| | Luke Falk | 6 | 2015 | Oregon State |
| | Luke Falk | 6 | 2017 | Oregon State |
| | Anthony Gordon | 6 | 2019 | Oregon State |

== Rushing ==
=== Rushing yards ===
Career
| Rank | Player | Yards | Years |
|---|---|---|---|
| 1 | Rueben Mayes | 3,519 | 1982 1983 1984 1985 |
| 2 | Steve Broussard | 3,054 | 1986 1987 1988 1989 |
| 3 | Shaumbe Wright-Fair | 2,939 | 1989 1990 1991 1992 |
| 4 | Tim Harris | 2,814 | 1979 1980 1981 1982 |
| 5 | Jerome Harrison | 2,800 | 2004 2005 |
| 6 | Kerry Porter | 2,618 | 1982 1983 1984 1985 1986 |
| 7 | Dwight Tardy | 2,241 | 2006 2007 2008 2009 |
| 8 | Max Borghi | 2,158 | 2018 2019 2020 2021 |
| 9 | Michael Black | 2,129 | 1996 1997 |
| 10 | Ken Grandberry | 2,102 | 1971 1972 1973 |

Single season
| Rank | Player | Yards | Year |
|---|---|---|---|
| 1 | Jerome Harrison | 1,900 | 2005 |
| 2 | Rueben Mayes | 1,637 | 1984 |
| 3 | Shaumbe Wright-Fair | 1,330 | 1992 |
| 4 | Steve Broussard | 1,280 | 1988 |
| 5 | Steve Broussard | 1,237 | 1989 |
| 6 | Rueben Mayes | 1,236 | 1985 |
| 7 | Bernard Jackson | 1,189 | 1971 |
| 8 | Michael Black | 1,181 | 1997 |
| 9 | Andrew Jones | 1,059 | 1973 |
| 10 | Kevin Brown | 1,046 | 1998 |

Single game
| Rank | Player | Yards | Year | Opponent |
|---|---|---|---|---|
| 1 | Rueben Mayes | 357 | 1984 | Oregon |
| 2 | Bernard Jackson | 261 | 1971 | Oregon |
| 3 | Jerome Harrison | 260 | 2005 | UCLA |
| 4 | Jerome Harrison | 247 | 2004 | UCLA |
| 5 | Jerome Harrison | 240 | 2005 | Arizona State |
| 6 | Tali Ena | 218 | 1979 | Oregon State |
| | Jerome Harrison | 218 | 2005 | Stanford |
| 8 | Rueben Mayes | 216 | 1984 | Stanford |
| 9 | Michael Black | 214 | 1996 | California |
| | Dwight Tardy | 214 | 2007 | UCLA |

=== Rushing touchdowns ===
Career
| Rank | Player | TDs | Years |
|---|---|---|---|
| 1 | Steve Broussard | 33 | 1986 1987 1988 1989 |
| 2 | Max Borghi | 32 | 2018 2019 2020 2021 |
| 3 | Jerome Harrison | 25 | 2004 2005 |
| 4 | Rueben Mayes | 23 | 1982 1983 1984 1985 |
| 5 | Shaumbe Wright-Fair | 22 | 1989 1990 1991 1992 |
| 6 | Ken Grandberry | 19 | 1971 1972 1973 |
| | Michael Black | 19 | 1996 1997 |
| | Kerry Porter | 19 | 1982 1983 1984 1985 1986 |
| 9 | Bernard Jackson | 18 | 1970 1971 |
| | Gerard Wicks | 18 | 2014 2015 2016 |
| | John Mateer | 18 | 2022 2023 2024 |

Single season
| Rank | Player | TDs | Year |
|---|---|---|---|
| 1 | Jerome Harrison | 16 | 2005 |
| 2 | John Mateer | 15 | 2024 |
| 3 | Steve Broussard | 13 | 1989 |
| | Shaumbe Wright-Fair | 13 | 1992 |
| 5 | Deon Burnett | 12 | 1999 |
| | Max Borghi | 12 | 2021 |
| 7 | Bob Kennedy | 11 | 1941 |
| | Bernard Jackson | 11 | 1971 |
| | Ken Grandberry | 11 | 1972 |
| | Samoa Samoa | 11 | 1980 |
| | Rueben Mayes | 11 | 1984 |
| | Steve Broussard | 11 | 1988 |
| | Michael Black | 11 | 1997 |
| | Gerard Wicks | 11 | 2016 |
| | Max Borghi | 11 | 2019 |

Single game
| Rank | Player | TDs | Year | Opponent |
|---|---|---|---|---|
| 1 | James Matthews | 5 | 1982 | Idaho |
| 2 | Rueben Mayes | 4 | 1984 | Stanford |
| | Rueben Mayes | 4 | 1985 | Montana State |
| | Shaumbe Wright-Fair | 4 | 1992 | Temple |
| | Deon Burnett | 4 | 1999 | Louisiana-Lafayette |
| | Dave Minnich | 4 | 2001 | Arizona |
| | John Tippins | 4 | 2001 | Montana State |
| | Kirby Vorhees | 4 | 2026 | Colorado State |

== Receiving ==
=== Receptions ===
Career
| Rank | Player | Rec | Years |
|---|---|---|---|
| 1 | Gabe Marks^ | 316 | 2013 2014 2015 2016 |
| 2 | River Cracraft | 218 | 2013 2014 2015 2016 |
| 3 | Jamal Morrow | 202 | 2014 2015 2016 2017 |
| | James Williams | 202 | 2016 2017 2018 |
| 5 | Michael Bumpus | 195 | 2004 2005 2006 2007 |
| 6 | Dom Williams | 192 | 2012 2013 2014 2015 |
| 7 | Marquess Wilson | 189 | 2010 2011 2012 |
| 8 | Brandon Gibson | 182 | 2005 2006 2007 2008 |
| 9 | Travell Harris | 179 | 2018 2019 2020 2021 |
| 10 | Hugh Campbell | 177 | 1960 1961 1962 |

^ Indicates conference record holder for this statistic

Single season
| Rank | Player | Rec | Year |
|---|---|---|---|
| 1 | Vince Mayle | 106 | 2014 |
| 2 | Gabe Marks | 104 | 2015 |
| 3 | Gabe Marks | 89 | 2016 |
| | Lincoln Victor | 89 | 2023 |
| 5 | Max Borghi | 86 | 2019 |
| 6 | Easop Winston Jr. | 85 | 2019 |
| 7 | James Williams | 83 | 2017 |
| 8 | Marquess Wilson | 82 | 2011 |
| 9 | Isiah Myers | 78 | 2014 |
| | Brandon Arconado | 78 | 2019 |

Single game
| Rank | Player | Rec | Year | Opponent |
|---|---|---|---|---|
| 1 | Lincoln Victor | 16 | 2023 | Oregon |
| 2 | Vince Mayle | 15 | 2014 | Arizona State |
| 3 | River Cracraft | 14 | 2014 | Stanford |
| | Vince Mayle | 14 | 2014 | Arizona |
| | Gabe Marks | 14 | 2015 | Rutgers |
| 6 | Gabe Marks | 13 | 2013 | Oregon |
| | James Williams | 13 | 2017 | Montana State |
| | Davontavean Martin | 13 | 2018 | Eastern Washington |
| 9 | Doug Flansburg | 12 | 1966 | Houston |
| | Marquess Wilson | 12 | 2012 | Oregon |
| | Vince Mayle | 12 | 2014 | Rutgers |
| | Gabe Marks | 12 | 2015 | UCLA |
| | Tavares Martin | 12 | 2016 | Boise State |
| | Lincoln Victor | 12 | 2023 | Stanford |

=== Receiving yards ===
Career
| Rank | Player | Yards | Years |
|---|---|---|---|
| 1 | Gabe Marks | 3,453 | 2012 2013 2015 2016 |
| 2 | Marquess Wilson | 3,207 | 2010 2011 2012 |
| 3 | Dom Williams | 2,889 | 2012 2013 2014 2015 |
| 4 | Brandon Gibson | 2,756 | 2005 2006 2007 2008 |
| 5 | Jason Hill | 2,704 | 2003 2004 2005 2006 |
| 6 | River Cracraft | 2,701 | 2013 2014 2015 2016 |
| 7 | Hugh Campbell | 2,459 | 1960 1961 1962 |
| 8 | Nian Taylor | 2,447 | 1996 1997 1998 1999 |
| 9 | Tim Stallworth | 2,250 | 1986 1987 1988 1989 |
| 10 | Phillip Bobo | 2,182 | 1990 1991 1992 |

Single season
| Rank | Player | Yards | Year |
|---|---|---|---|
| 1 | Vince Mayle | 1,483 | 2014 |
| 2 | Marquess Wilson | 1,388 | 2011 |
| 3 | Kyle Williams | 1,198 | 2024 |
| 4 | Gabe Marks | 1,192 | 2015 |
| 5 | Brandon Gibson | 1,180 | 2007 |
| 6 | Nakoa McElrath | 1,163 | 2001 |
| 7 | Tim Stallworth | 1,151 | 1988 |
| 8 | Mike Levenseller | 1,124 | 1976 |
| 9 | Brandon Arconado | 1,109 | 2019 |
| 10 | Jason Hill | 1,097 | 2005 |

Single game
| Rank | Player | Yards | Year | Opponent |
|---|---|---|---|---|
| 1 | Vince Mayle | 263 | 2014 | California |
| 2 | Deron Pointer | 255 | 1993 | Arizona State |
| 3 | Nian Taylor | 254 | 1998 | Idaho |
| 4 | Gail Cogdill | 252 | 1958 | Northwestern |
| | Vince Mayle | 252 | 2014 | Arizona State |
| 6 | Jason Hill | 240 | 2005 | California |
| 7 | Marquess Wilson | 236 | 2011 | San Diego State |
| 8 | Marquess Wilson | 223 | 2011 | Arizona State |
| 9 | Isiah Myers | 227 | 2014 | Portland State |
| 10 | Ed Barker | 215 | 1951 | Oregon State |

=== Receiving touchdowns ===
Career
| Rank | Player | TDs | Years |
|---|---|---|---|
| 1 | Gabe Marks | 37 | 2012 2013 2015 2016 |
| 2 | Jason Hill | 32 | 2003 2004 2005 2006 |
| 3 | Dom Williams | 30 | 2012 2013 2014 2015 |
| 4 | Marquess Wilson | 23 | 2010 2011 2012 |
| 5 | Hugh Campbell | 22 | 1960 1961 1962 |
| 6 | River Cracraft | 20 | 2013 2014 2015 2016 |
| | Kyle Williams | 20 | 2023 2024 |
| 8 | Jared Karstetter | 19 | 2008 2009 2010 2011 |
| | Isiah Myers | 19 | 2011 2012 2013 2014 |
| | Easop Winston, Jr. | 19 | 2018 2019 |

Single season
| Rank | Player | TDs | Year |
|---|---|---|---|
| 1 | Gabe Marks | 15 | 2015 |
| 2 | Kyle Williams | 14 | 2024 |
| 3 | Jason Hill | 13 | 2005 |
| | Gabe Marks | 13 | 2016 |
| 5 | Jason Hill | 12 | 2004 |
| | Marquess Wilson | 12 | 2011 |
| | Isiah Myers | 12 | 2014 |
| 8 | Kevin McKenzie | 11 | 1997 |
| | Chris Jackson | 11 | 1997 |
| | Devard Darling | 11 | 2002 |
| | Dom Williams | 11 | 2015 |
| | Easop Winston, Jr. | 11 | 2019 |

Single game
| Rank | Player | TDs | Year | Opponent |
|---|---|---|---|---|
| 1 | Gabe Marks | 4 | 2015 | Arizona |
| | Easop Winston Jr. | 4 | 2019 | UCLA |
| 3 | Jack Fanning | 3 | 1957 | Nebraska |
| | Hugh Campbell | 3 | 1960 | Arizona State |
| | Mike Levenseller | 3 | 1976 | Washington |
| | Phillip Bobo | 3 | 1990 | Arizona State |
| | Deron Pointer | 3 | 1993 | Arizona State |
| | Nian Taylor | 3 | 1998 | Idaho |
| | Nakoa McElrath | 3 | 2000 | Arizona |
| | Nakoa McElrath | 3 | 2001 | Boise State |
| | Jason Hill | 3 | 2004 | Idaho |
| | Jason Hill | 3 | 2005 | California |
| | Chris Jordan | 3 | 2006 | Idaho |
| | Marquess Wilson | 3 | 2011 | Arizona State |
| | Isiah Myers | 3 | 2014 | Portland State |
| | River Cracraft | 3 | 2014 | California |
| | River Cracraft | 3 | 2016 | California |
| | Tavares Martin | 3 | 2017 | Oregon State |
| | Josh Kelly | 3 | 2023 | Oregon State |
| | Kyle Williams | 3 | 2024 | Utah State |
| | Kyle Williams | 3 | 2024 | New Mexico |

== Total offense ==
Total offense is the sum of passing and rushing statistics. It does not include receiving or returns.

=== Total offense yards ===
Career
| Rank | Player | Yards | Years |
|---|---|---|---|
| 1 | Luke Falk^ | 14,081 | 2014 2015 2016 2017 |
| 2 | Alex Brink | 11,011 | 2004 2005 2006 2007 |
| 3 | Connor Halliday | 10,816 | 2011 2012 2013 2014 |
| 4 | Jason Gesser | 9,007 | 1999 2000 2001 2002 |
| 5 | Jack Thompson | 7,698 | 1975 1976 1977 1978 |
| 6 | Ryan Leaf | 7,262 | 1995 1996 1997 |
| 7 | Drew Bledsoe | 7,200 | 1990 1991 1992 |
| 8 | Cam Ward | 7,168 | 2022 2023 |
| 9 | Timm Rosenbach | 6,690 | 1986 1987 1988 |
| 10 | Jeff Tuel | 5,984 | 2009 2010 2011 2012 |

^ Indicates conference record holder for this statistic

Single season
| Rank | Player | Yards | Year |
|---|---|---|---|
| 1 | Anthony Gordon | 5,220 | 2019 |
| 2 | Gardner Minshew | 4,898 | 2018 |
| 3 | Luke Falk | 4,446 | 2015 |
| 4 | Connor Halliday | 4,420 | 2013 |
| 5 | Luke Falk | 4,400 | 2016 |
| 6 | John Mateer | 3,965 | 2024 |
| 7 | Ryan Leaf | 3,920 | 1997 |
| 8 | Cam Ward | 3,879 | 2023 |
| 9 | Alex Brink | 3,852 | 2007 |
| 10 | Connor Halliday | 3,742 | 2014 |

Single game
| Rank | Player | Yards | Year | Opponent |
|---|---|---|---|---|
| 1 | Connor Halliday | 751 | 2014 | California |

=== Touchdowns responsible for ===
"Touchdowns responsible for" is the official NCAA term for combined rushing and passing touchdowns. It does not include receiving or returns.

Career
| Rank | Player | TDs | Years |
|---|---|---|---|
| 1 | Luke Falk | 123 | 2014 2015 2016 2017 |
| 2 | Connor Halliday | 90 | 2011 2012 2013 2014 |
| 3 | Alex Brink | 81 | 2004 2005 2006 2007 |
| 4 | Jason Gesser | 74 | 1999 2000 2001 2002 |
| 5 | Ryan Leaf | 73 | 1995 1996 1997 |
| 6 | Jack Thompson | 63 | 1975 1976 1977 1978 |
| 7 | Cam Ward | 61 | 2022 2023 |
| 8 | Drew Bledsoe | 56 | 1990 1991 1992 |
| 9 | Timm Rosenbach | 54 | 1986 1987 1988 |
| 10 | John Mateer | 50 | 2022 2023 2024 |

Single season
| Rank | Player | TDs | Year |
|---|---|---|---|
| 1 | Anthony Gordon | 45 | 2019 |
| 2 | John Mateer | 44 | 2024 |
| 3 | Gardner Minshew | 42 | 2018 |
| 4 | Luke Falk | 41 | 2015 |
| 5 | Ryan Leaf | 40 | 1997 |
| 6 | Luke Falk | 38 | 2016 |
| 7 | Timm Rosenbach | 34 | 1988 |
| | Connor Halliday | 34 | 2013 |
| 9 | Cam Ward | 33 | 2023 |
| 10 | Connor Halliday | 32 | 2014 |

== Defense ==
=== Interceptions ===
Career
| Rank | Player | Ints | Years |
|---|---|---|---|
| 1 | Lamont Thompson^ | 24 | 1997 1998 1999 2001 |
| 2 | Jason David | 16 | 2000 2001 2002 2003 |
| 3 | Deone Bucannon | 15 | 2010 2011 2012 2013 |
| 4 | Rick Reed | 14 | 1966 1967 1968 |
| 5 | Bill Lippincott | 13 | 1945 1946 1947 1948 |
| | Lionel Thomas | 13 | 1969 1970 |
| 7 | Eric Johnson | 12 | 1971 1972 1973 |
| | Erik Coleman | 12 | 2000 2001 2002 2003 |
| 9 | Don Paul | 11 | 1946 1947 1948 1949 |
| | Torey Hunter | 11 | 1991 1992 1993 1994 |
| | Marcus Trufant | 11 | 1999 2000 2001 2002 |

^ Indicates conference record holder for this statistic

Single season
| Rank | Player | Ints | Year |
|---|---|---|---|
| 1 | Lamont Thompson | 10 | 2001 |
| 2 | Rick Reed | 8 | 1968 |
| 3 | Ernest Thomas | 7 | 1969 |
| | Eric Johnson | 7 | 1973 |
| | Bill Lippincott | 7 | 1945 |
| | Jason David | 7 | 2002 |
| | Erik Coleman | 7 | 2003 |
| 8 | Lionel Thomas | 6 | 1969 |
| | Lamont Thompson | 6 | 1997 |
| | Jason David | 6 | 2003 |
| | Deone Bucannon | 6 | 2013 |

Single game
| Rank | Player | Ints | Year | Opponent |
|---|---|---|---|---|
| 1 | Lamont Thompson | 4 | 2001 | UCLA |
| 2 | Bill Lippincott | 3 | 1945 | Oregon State |
| | Laverne Torgeson | 3 | 1948 | Penn State |
| | Clete Baltes | 3 | 1962 | Stanford |
| | Rick Reed | 3 | 1966 | Oregon |
| | Lionel Thomas | 3 | 1969 | Pacific |
| | Lionel Thomas | 3 | 1970 | Idaho |
| | Eric Johnson | 3 | 1972 | Washington |
| | Paul Sorensen | 3 | 1981 | Arizona |
| | Ron Collins | 3 | 1984 | Stanford |
| | Torey Hunter | 3 | 1991 | Arizona State |
| | Lamont Thompson | 3 | 1997 | Washington |
| | Will Derting | 3 | 2002 | Nevada |

=== Tackles ===
Career
| Rank | Player | Tackles | Years |
|---|---|---|---|
| 1 | Lee Blakeney | 524 | 1980 1981 1983 1984 |
| 2 | Anthony McClanahan | 440 | 1990 1991 1992 1993 |
| 3 | Brian Forde | 436 | 1984 1985 1986 1987 |
| 4 | Jahad Woods | 427 | 2017 2018 2019 2020 2021 |
| 5 | Deone Bucannon | 384 | 2010 2011 2012 2013 |
| 6 | John Rushing | 343 | 1991 1992 1993 1994 |
| 7 | Tom Poe | 334 | 1970 1971 1972 1973 |
| 8 | Billy Newman | 325 | 1998 1999 2000 2001 |
| 9 | Greg Trent | 323 | 2005 2006 2007 2008 |
| 10 | Gary Larsen | 317 | 1971 1972 1973 1974 |

Single season
| Rank | Player | Tackles | Year |
|---|---|---|---|
| 1 | Brian Forde | 157 | 1986 |
| 2 | Lee Blakeney | 153 | 1984 |
| 3 | Tuineau Alipate | 147 | 1987 |
| 4 | Anthony McClanahan | 144 | 1991 |
| 5 | Brian Forde | 141 | 1987 |
| | Jahad Woods | 141 | 2019 |
| 7 | Anthony McClanahan | 140 | 1992 |
| 8 | Tom Poe | 138 | 1971 |
| 9 | James Darling | 136 | 1996 |
| 10 | Dan Grayson | 133 | 1989 |

Single game
| Rank | Player | Tackles | Year | Opponent |
|---|---|---|---|---|
| 1 | Brian Forde | 28 | 1985 | California |
| 2 | Brian Forde | 25 | 1987 | Michigan |
| | Dan Grayson | 25 | 1989 | Arizona |
| 4 | Brian Forde | 24 | 1986 | Stanford |
| 5 | Anthony McClanahan | 23 | 1991 | USC |
| | James Darling | 23 | 1996 | Colorado |
| 7 | Brian Forde | 20 | 1986 | Arizona |
| | Tuineau Alipate | 20 | 1987 | Michigan |
| | Dan Grayson | 20 | 1989 | Arizona |
| | Anthony McClanahan | 20 | 1991 | Stanford |
| | Anthony McClanahan | 20 | 1992 | Arizona State |
| | Brandon Moore | 20 | 1997 | Arizona State |

=== Sacks ===
Career
| Rank | Player | Sacks | Years |
|---|---|---|---|
| 1 | DeWayne Patterson | 37.5 | 1991 1992 1993 1994 |
| 2 | D.D. Acholonu | 32.5 | 2000 2001 2002 2003 |
| 3 | Mkristo Bruce | 29.5 | 2003 2004 2005 2006 |
| 4 | Isaac Brown | 22.5 | 2000 2001 2002 2003 |
| 5 | Keith Millard | 21.5 | 1981 1982 1983 |
| | Hercules Mata'afa | 21.5 | 2015 2016 2017 |
| 7 | Brennan Jackson | 21.0 | 2019 2020 2021 2022 2023 |
| 8 | Travis Long | 20.5 | 2009 2010 2011 2012 |
| 9 | Scott Pelluer | 19.0 | 1977 1978 1979 1980 |
| 10 | Ivan Cook | 17.5 | 1985 1986 1987 1988 |

Single season
| Rank | Player | Sacks | Year |
|---|---|---|---|
| 1 | DeWayne Patterson | 17.0 | 1993 |
| 2 | D.D. Acholonu | 16.5 | 2003 |
| 3 | DeWayne Patterson | 13.5 | 1994 |
| 4 | Rien Long | 13.0 | 2002 |
| 5 | Keith Millard | 12.5 | 1983 |
| 6 | Scott Pelluer | 12.0 | 1980 |
| 7 | Mkristo Bruce | 11.0 | 2006 |
| 8 | Mike Walker | 10.0 | 1981 |
| | Mkristo Bruce | 10.0 | 2005 |
| 10 | D.D. Acholonu | 9.5 | 2001 |
| | Isaac Brown | 9.5 | 2001 |
| | Travis Long | 9.5 | 2012 |
| | Hercules Mata'afa | 9.5 | 2017 |

Single game
| Rank | Player | Sacks | Year | Opponent |
|---|---|---|---|---|
| 1 | Mkristo Bruce | 5.0 | 2006 | Stanford |
| 2 | Tim Downing | 4.0 | 1987 | California |
| | Keith Millard | 4.0 | 1983 | Oregon State |
| | DeWayne Patterson | 4.0 | 1993 | Oregon |
| | DeWayne Patterson | 4.0 | 1994 | UCLA |
| | Andy Mattingly | 4.0 | 2007 | Arizona State |
| 7 | DeWayne Patterson | 3.5 | 1994 | Oregon |
| 8 | Daiyan Henley | 3.0 | 2022 | Colorado State |
| | Ansel Din-Mbuh | 3.0 | 2024 | San Diego State |

== Kicking ==
=== Field goals made ===
Career
| Rank | Player | FGs | Years |
|---|---|---|---|
| 1 | Drew Dunning | 68 | 2000 2001 2002 2003 |
| 2 | Jason Hanson | 63 | 1988 1989 1990 1991 |
| 3 | Erik Powell | 51 | 2014 2015 2016 2017 |
| 4 | Andrew Furney | 47 | 2010 2011 2012 2013 |
| 5 | John Traut | 43 | 1982 1983 1984 1985 |
| | Dean Janikowski | 43 | 2021 2022 2023 2024 |
| 7 | Blake Mazza | 34 | 2018 2019 2020 |
| 8 | Rian Lindell | 32 | 1997 1998 1999 |
| 9 | Joe Danelo | 31 | 1972 1973 1974 |
| 10 | Aaron Price | 30 | 1992 1993 |

Single season
| Rank | Player | FGs | Year |
|---|---|---|---|
| 1 | Drew Dunning | 27 | 2003 |
| 2 | Drew Dunning | 22 | 2002 |
| 3 | Jason Hanson | 21 | 1989 |
| 4 | Erik Powell | 20 | 2015 |
| | Erik Powell | 20 | 2017 |
| | Blake Mazza | 20 | 2019 |
| 7 | Drew Dunning | 18 | 2001 |
| 8 | Jason Hanson | 17 | 1990 |
| | Aaron Price | 17 | 1993 |
| 10 | John Traut | 16 | 1983 |
| | Andrew Furney | 16 | 2013 |
| | Jack Stevens | 16 | 2025 |

Single game
| Rank | Player | FGs | Year | Opponent |
|---|---|---|---|---|
| 1 | Drew Dunning | 5 | 2003 | New Mexico |
| | Erik Powell | 5 | 2015 | Stanford |

=== Field goal percentage ===
Career
| Rank | Player | FG% | Years |
|---|---|---|---|
| 1 | Blake Mazza | 85.3% | 2018 2019 2020 |
| 2 | Jack Stevens | 84.2% | 2025 |
| 3 | Drew Dunning | 77.3% | 2000 2001 2002 2003 |
| | Romeen Abdollmohammadi | 77.3% | 2006 2007 |
| 5 | Andrew Furney | 77.0% | 2010 2011 2012 2013 |
| 6 | Quentin Breshears | 75.0% | 2014 |
| 7 | Dean Janikowski | 72.9% | 2021 2022 2023 2024 |
| 8 | Erik Powell | 72.9% | 2014 2015 2016 2017 |
| 9 | John Traut | 66.2% | 1982 1983 1984 1985 |
| 10 | Jason Hanson | 65.6% | 1988 1989 1990 1991 |

Single season
| Rank | Player | FG% | Year |
|---|---|---|---|
| 1 | Black Mazza | 95.2% | 2019 |
| 2 | Andrew Furney | 87.5% | 2011 |
| 3 | Drew Dunning | 87.1% | 2003 |
| 4 | Jack Stevens | 84.2% | 2025 |
| 5 | Erik Powell | 83.3% | 2017 |
| 6 | Dean Janikowski | 82.4% | 2021 |
| 7 | Drew Dunning | 81.8% | 2001 |
| 8 | Andrew Furney | 80.0% | 2013 |
| 9 | Dean Janikowski | 78.6% | 2022 |
| 10 | Erik Powell | 76.9% | 2015 |
