= 2013 New Mexico Bowl =

American college football game

2013 Gildan New Mexico Bowl
Washington State Cougars	Colorado State Rams
(6–6)	(7–6)
Pac-12	Mountain West
45	48
Head coach: Mike Leach	Head coach: Jim McElwain
	1	2	3	4	Total
Washington State	21	14	3	7	45
Colorado State	10	13	7	18	48
- Date: December 21, 2013
- Season: 2013
- Stadium: University Stadium
- Location: Albuquerque, New Mexico
- MVP: Offense: Connor Halliday (QB), WSU; Defense: Shaquil Barrett (DE) CSU
- Favorite: Wash. St. by 4½
- Referee: Ken Williamson (SEC)
- Attendance: 27,104

United States TV coverage
- Network: ESPN/ESPN Radio
- Announcers: TV: Mark Jones (play-by-play), Brock Huard (analyst), Jessica Mendoza (sideline); Radio: John Sadak (play-by-play), Tom Ramsey (analyst), and Niki Noto (sideline)

The 2013 New Mexico Bowl was an American college football bowl game that was played on Saturday, December 21, 2013 at University Stadium on the campus of the University of New Mexico in Albuquerque, New Mexico. The eighth annual New Mexico Bowl, it featured the Colorado State Rams, representing the Mountain West Conference, against the Washington State Cougars, representing the Pac-12 Conference. The game began at 12:00 noon MST and was televised on ESPN. It was the first of the 35 2013–14 NCAA football bowl games that concluded the 2013 NCAA Division I FBS football season. Sponsored by Gildan Activewear, the game was officially known as the Gildan New Mexico Bowl. The Rams won 48–45 after they were down 15 points in the final minutes of the game; they scored a touchdown, Washington State lost two fumbles, after both of which, Colorado State scored, and after the latter of which, as time expired, they kicked a field goal to win the game.

== Teams ==
The game has conference tie-in agreements with the Mountain West Conference (MWC), which ultimately sent Colorado State, a team that finished 7–6 during the season and had not appeared in a bowl since 2008 (they played in the New Mexico Bowl), who was the fourth selection from the conference, and the Pac-12 Conference (Pac-12), which ultimately sent Washington State, who was making their first bowl appearance since 2003 (they played in the Holiday Bowl), and was the seventh selection from the conference. The bowl was the first meeting between the teams.

== Pregame buildup ==
Few media outlets thought this would be a particularly good game to watch, as it featured two mediocre teams, however since it was the first bowl game of the year, it received a decent amount of hype beforehand. One preview noted that it should be a fun game to watch, as it "promises to be a high-scoring" game. Both teams featured strong offenses, however they juxtaposed one another in that Washington State, as typical of Mike Leach-coached football teams, heavily relied on the passing game, whereas Colorado State relied heavily upon the running game. Though Washington State was only a 3.5 point favorite, college football analysts were nearly unanimous in predicting a Washington State victory by an even larger margin.

=== Washington State ===
Led by Mike Leach, in his second-year at Washington State, the Cougars opened the season with a loss to Auburn, an eventual top finisher on the final BCS Standings, and a win over then No. 24 ranked USC that sprung a three-game winning streak, prior to a loss vs. No.5 ranked Stanford. They lost three of their next four games, but then won two more, prior to closing their season with a loss to Washington in the Apple Cup. They played the most difficult schedule in the country, according to statistician Jeff Sagarin of USA Today.

==== Offense ====
An air raid offense (predominantly passing-oriented with quarterback in shotgun formation usually with four wide receivers) coordinated by Leach, Washington State was projected to have one of its biggest advantages in the passing game, where junior quarterback Connor Halliday recorded 4187 passing yards, which was fourth in the country, on 656 passing attempts, which led the country by more than 50, for 28 touchdowns and 21 interceptions, the latter of which was most in the country. He spread the ball around to many different receivers; eight different receivers had more than 30 catches. The Cougars' leading receiver was sophomore Gabe Marks, who caught 69 passes for 770 yards and 6 touchdowns. Fellow sophomore Dom Williams caught 39 passes for 644 yards and a team-leading 7 touchdowns, 6 feet 3 inches (1.91 m) 240 pounds (110 kg) senior Vince Mayle caught 40 passes for 501 yards and 6 touchdowns, and freshman River Cracaft, an honorable mention all-conference honoree, caught 37 passes for 489 yards and 2 touchdowns. There were no tight ends on the roster. Washington State's offensive line was expected to be able to protect Halliday relatively easily, as Colorado State would have to drop a significant portion of its defense in to coverage, thus limiting its ability to blitz. Senior center Elliot Bosch, who was an honorable mention all-conference performer, anchored the offensive line, and was supported by fellow former walk-ons Gunnar Eklund, a sophomore left tackle, and Joe Dahl, a sophomore left guard. Leach commented on the group of walk-ons, specifically Bosch, noting, "He’s developed his skills, worked really hard in the weight room and has been a big cornerstone for us. We wouldn’t be in a bowl game without him." The Cougars' measly rushing attack, which averaged only 58.7 yards per game (123 out of 123 in the FBS), included junior Marcus Mason and sophomore Teondray Caldwell. Senior Andrew Furney, an honorable mention all-conference performer, handled the kicking duties, and made 15 of his 19 field goal tries with a long of 52 yards and 43 of his 44 extra point tries.

==== Defense ====
Coordinated by Mike Breske, the Cougars' 3-4 defense surrendered an average of 31.3 points per game, which was 92nd in the country. The defense was led by first team All-American safety Deone Bucannon, a prospect for the 2014 NFL draft who recorded a team-leading 109 tackles, and tied for the team-lead with five interceptions (tied for 15th in FBS). He was joined at safety by Hawaiian sophomore Taylor Taliulu, who totaled 54 tackles. Fifth-year senior Casey Locker also contributed. At cornerback, senior Damante Horton also recorded 5 interceptions, and added 43 tackles and 3.5 tackles for loss (TFL), fifth-year senior Nolan Washington, who recorded 35 tackles, and freshman Daquawn Brown, who recorded 2 interceptions. The Cougars' linebackers were led by outside linebacker senior Justin Sagote, who finished second on the defense with 91 tackles, and added 2.5 TFL. Inside linebacker Darryl Monroe finished third on the defense with 81 tackles, adding 6.5 TFL, and 2 sacks. Other contributors at linebacker included junior Cyrus Coen, who totaled 53 tackles, 6.5 TFL, and 3 sacks (third on the defense), sophomore Tana Pritchard, who totaled 47 tackles, and sophomore Kache Palacio, who recorded 42 tackles, 6.5 TFL, and 4 sacks. The strength of the Cougars' defense, however, was on the defensive line, particularly in stopping the run, which would be crucial against Colorado State's Kapri Bibbs. Key contributors on the line included 303 pounds (137 kg) sophomore Xavier Cooper, who led the defense with 13 TFL and 4.5 sacks, nose tackle Ioane Gauta, who recorded 41 tackles, 8 TFL, and 3 sacks, and Kalafitoni Pole, who recorded 26 tackles, 3 TFL, and 2 sacks.

=== Colorado State ===
Led by head coach Jim McElwain, who played quarterback at Eastern Washington University in Cheney, Washington, about 67 miles from Washington State, the Rams went 7–6 during the season, yet did not win a single game against an opponent with a winning record. They began the season losing three of their first four games, including a loss to then number-one Alabama, where McElwain had previously spent several seasons as offensive coordinator. Subsequently, they won three of their next four games, including a victory in the Battle for the Bronze Boot against Wyoming before closing their season winning three of five, finishing a season with a win against Air Force.

==== Offense ====
Colorado State's offensive coordinator was Dave Baldwin, and the offense performed rather well, finishing 39th in the FBS in passing yards per game (258.5), 31st in rushing yards per game (202.7), and 29th in points per game (35.3). The focal point of the Rams' offense was sophomore junior college-transfer running back Kapri Bibbs, who was "one of the most underappreciated offensive threats in the country". He totaled 254 rushes (tied for 13th in FBS), 1572 rushing yards (eighth in FBS), and 28 touchdowns (second in FBS). Not surprisingly, he was a first team all-conference selection. Senior Chris Nwoke and sophomore Donnell Alexander also contributed at running back. At quarterback, junior Garrett Grayson threw 21 touchdown passes to 10 interceptions, totaling 3327 passing yards. Among his favorite targets were freshman Rashard Higgins, who caught 64 passes for 795 yards and 6 touchdowns and sophomore Joe Hansley, who caught 48 passes for 557 yards and 1 touchdown. At tight end, NFL Draft prospect Crockett Gillmore caught 43 passes for 533 yards and 2 touchdowns. Wide receivers Charles Lovett and Thomas Coffman, as well as tight end Kivon Cartwright were key contributors in the passing game. Colorado State's offensive line was "gnarly", and featured four seniors and one junior, and were anchored center Weston Richburg. Their kicker was Jared Roberts, a first team all-conference performer who made 17 of his 20 field goal tries with a long of 54 yards and all 54 of his extra point attempts.

==== Defense ====
Co-coordinated by Marty English and Al Simmons, the Rams' 3-4 defense was in the middle of the pack nationally, having allowed 417.3 yards per game and 28.6 points per game. They were better defending the pass than the run. The Rams' defense was anchored by senior linebacker Shaquil Barrett, whom the Mountain West Conference (MWC) named their defensive player of the year; he set a MWC record with 20.5 TFL, and totaled 12 sacks, which was third in the FBS. Other starters at linebacker included junior Max Morgan, who led the defense, totaling 129 tackles on the season, junior Aaron Davis, who was second on the defense with 113 tackles, and added 6 TFL, and sophomore Cory James, who totaled 54 tackles and 6 sacks, the latter of which was second on the team. In the secondary, second team all-conference honoree Shaq Bell totaled 57 tackles and 7.5 TFL at cornerback. Safety Kevin Pierre-Lewis, a redshirt freshman, totaled 70 tackles on the season. The defensive leader in interceptions was sophomore safety Trent Matthews, who recorded 4 in addition to 64 tackles. Junior Bernard Blake totaled 60 tackles on the season. On the defensive line, the Rams featured three senior starters – Eli Edwards, a defensive end who totaled 28 tackles and 3.5 TFL entering the bowl game, Curtis Wilson, a defensive tackle who totaled 28 tackles and 2 sacks entering the bowl game, and 330 pounds (150 kg) nose tackle Calvin Tonga, who totaled 24 tackles and 2.5 TFL entering the bowl game. True freshman Jake Schlager led the team in special teams tackles with 17.

== Game summary ==
=== First quarter ===
Washington State (WSU) got the ball to start the game, but on the second play of the game, Connor Halliday threw an interception to Max Morgan of Colorado State (CSU), but Nolan Washington stripped Rashad Higgins on the ensuing play, giving WSU the ball right back, and they subsequently scored on a Halliday pass to River Cracraft. On CSU's ensuing drive, they were faced with a fourth down during which they punted from their end zone; the punt was blocked, setting WSU up at the six-yard line. After a roughing the passer penalty and then a holding penalty on consecutive plays, both against CSU, Halliday threw a 1-yard touchdown pass to Gabe Marks. After the ensuing kickoff, ESPN aired a series automobile and insurance commercials that were amongst the most viewed of the early bowl season. On the next drive, CSU was faced with a fourth down and short, and looked like they would punt, but at the last moment called an audible and rushed up the middle for a first down. The next play, quarterback Garrett Grayson threw a 63-yard pass to Charles Lovett, making the score 14–7. CSU had WSU stopped with a sack, however after an unsportsmanlike conduct penalty gave WSU a first down, Halliday threw a touchdown pass to Theron West on the next play. CSU subsequently drove down the field, and kicked a field goal. WSU finished the quarter with a three-and-out.

=== Second quarter ===
Colorado State embarked on a long drive at the end of the first quarter that spanned into the second quarter, lasted 19 plays, 69 yards, and took up 7:05, but ultimately came up short, ending with a 19-yard field goal by Jared Roberts. On CSU's next drive, Deone Bucannon intercepted a Grayson pass, setting WSU up with good field position, with which Halliday threw his fourth touchdown of the game, a 28-yard pass to Vince Mayle. Subsequently, WSU got the ball back after a 19-yard punt, and drove down the field on just 4 plays, capitalizing again on good field position with a 30 yard touchdown pass from Halliday to Rickey Galvin making the score 35–13. The pass was Halliday's fifth of the game, a new New Mexico Bowl record. On the ensuing drive for CSU, they went 75 yards down the field on 9 plays, ultimately scoring on a 1-yard touchdown run by Kapri Bibbs. After a three-and-out by WSU, CSU got the ball back with 30 seconds at the WSU 40 yard line. They took advantage of a pass interference penalty on WSU when Roberts kicked a 30-yard field goal as time expired, making the score 35–23 at the half.

=== Third quarter ===
Upon receiving the opening kickoff, CSU promptly went three-and-out, giving the ball back to WSU, who started their drive in CSU territory after a 23-yard punt. WSU entered the red zone, but ultimately settled for an Andrew Furney field goal to take the lead by 15 (38–23). CSU's ensuing drive lasted only one play – a 75-yard touchdown run by Kapri Bibbs that made the score 38–30, with Washington State retaining the eight-point advantage. Though they reached the red zone on their next drive, Cory James sacked Halliday twice, and then WSU committed a delay of game penalty, which ultimately moved them out of field goal range, so they had to punt. They had another opportunity, starting in CSU territory after Jordon Vaden fumbled the ball on a run after a catch, but punted then too. At the end of the third quarter, WSU led 38–30.

=== Fourth quarter ===
Early in the fourth quarter, WSU embarked on an 11-play, 80-yard drive that lasted 4:36, was led by Halliday completing eight of his nine pass attempts, and culminated when he completed a 22-yard touchdown pass to Isiah Myers to make the score 45–30. It would be WSU's final score ... after exchanging punts, CSU took possession of the ball with 4 minutes and 17 seconds remaining at their own 28-yard line, and Grayson led them on a drive that ended with a 12-yard touchdown pass from Grayson to Vaden. The extra point made the score 45–37. Looking to run out the clock, WSU repossessed the ball after the kickoff at their own 18-yard line with 2:52 to play. They executed two running plays, after both of which Colorado State burned timeouts to conserve time, and then converted a first down. On the next play, with three consecutive kneel-downs likely able to run out the clock, Halliday faked handing the ball off, and ran himself; he was hit at the line of scrimmage and appeared to fumble the ball (CSU would have recovered), but video review overturned the call on the field, and WSU retained possession. On the very next play, however, Jeremiah Laufasa rushed the ball, and CSU's Shaquil Barrett forced and recovered a fumble at the WSU 31-yard line, giving CSU the ball with 1:51 to play. CSU ran eight plays on their subsequent drive, en route to a 1-yard touchdown run by Kapri Bibbs. Needing a two-point conversion to tie the game, Donnell Alexander rushed the ball outside on a statue of liberty play and attempted to reach inside the pylon at the goal line, and was initially ruled out of bounds, however video review again overturned the call, and consequently, the score was tied at 45 with only 33 seconds to play. On the ensuing kickoff, WSU kick returner Teondray Caldwell brought the ball to the 23-yard line, where he fumbled, and CSU's Jake Schlager recovered at the 24-yard line. Two plays later on CSU's drive, Jared Roberts made a 41-yard field goal attempt as time expired to win the game, 48–45.

=== Broadcast ===
The game was broadcast on ESPN, with Mark Jones serving as the play-by-play announcer, Brock Huard, a former National Football League quarterback, serving as the analyst, and Olympic gold-medalist (in softball) Jessica Mendoza serving as the sideline reporter. ESPN also holds game rights on the radio, broadcasting it on ESPN Radio with commentators John Sadak (play-by-play), Tom Ramsey (analyst), and Niki Noto (sideline). Due to a basketball game between Georgetown and Kansas running late, the kickoff of the game could be seen only on ESPN News and WatchESPN until the basketball game ended.

=== Scoring summary ===
Scoring summary

Quarter	Time	Drive			Team	Scoring information	Score	
Quarter	Time	Plays	Yards	TOP	Team	Scoring information	Washington State	Colorado State
1	12:32	6	44	1:48	WSU	River Cracraft 25-yard touchdown reception from Connor Halliday, Andrew Furney kick good	7	0
1	11:17	1	5	0:20	WSU	Gabe Marks 1-yard touchdown reception from Halliday, Furney kick good	14	0
1	7:02	8	89	4:15	CSU	Charles Lovett 63-yard touchdown reception from Garrett Grayson, Jared Roberts kick good	14	7
1	5:27	8	75	1:35	WSU	Theron West 28-yard touchdown reception from Halliday, Furney kick good	21	7
1	2:52	7	64	2:35	CSU	25-yard field goal by Roberts	21	10
2	9:55	18	70	7:05	CSU	19-yard field goal by Roberts	21	13
2	6:52	3	27	1:05	WSU	Vince Mayle 28-yard touchdown reception from Halliday, Furney kick good	28	13
2	2:48	4	42	1:19	WSU	Rickey Galvin 3-yard touchdown reception from Halliday, Furney kick good	35	13
2	0:59	9	75	1:49	CSU	Kapri Bibbs 1-yard touchdown run, Roberts kick good	35	20
2	0:00	5	27	0:30	CSU	30-yard field goal by Roberts	35	23
3	10:43	9	27	2:32	WSU	33-yard field goal by Furney	38	23
3	10:30	1	75	0:13	CSU	Bibbs 75-yard touchdown run, Roberts kick good	38	30
4	9:35	11	80	4:36	WSU	Isiah Myers 22-yard touchdown reception from Halliday, Furney kick good	45	30
4	2:52	9	72	1:25	CSU	Jordon Vaden 12-yard touchdown reception from Grayson, Roberts kick good	45	37
4	0:33	8	33	1:18	CSU	Bibbs 1-yard touchdown run, 2-point run good	45	45
4	0:00	2	0	0:27	CSU	41-yard field goal by Roberts	45	48
"TOP" = time of possession. For other American football terms, see Glossary of American football.							45	48

=== Statistics ===
==== Team ====
Statistics	WSU	CSU
First Downs	21	29
Total offense, plays – yards	77–400	77–595
Rushes-yards (net)	19-–10	46–226
Passing yards (net)	410	369
Passes, Comp-Att-Int	37–58–1	31–51–1
Time of Possession	25:39	34:21

==== Individual ====
===== Passing =====
Team	Name	Completions	Attempts	Yards	Touchdowns	Interceptions
WSU	Connor Halliday	37	58	410	6	1
CSU	Garrett Grayson	31	50	369	2	1

===== Rushing =====
Team	Name	Rushes	Yards	Average	Touchdowns	Long
WSU	Theron West	3	17	5.7	0	7
WSU	Teondray Caldwell	3	14	4.7	0	7
WSU	Marcus Mason	4	5	1.3	0	5
CSU	Kapri Bibbs	27	169	6.3	3	75
CSU	Donnell Alexander	7	31	4.4	0	8
CSU	Garrett Grayson	8	10	1.3	0	10

===== Receiving =====
Team	Name	Receptions	Yards	Average	Touchdowns	Long
WSU	River Cracraft	9	125	13.9	1	25
WSU	Kristoff Williams	7	72	10.3	0	27
WSU	Theron West	3	50	16.7	1	28
WSU	Isiah Myers	3	45	15.0	1	22
WSU	Vince Mayle	2	38	19.0	1	28
WSU	Gabe Marks	5	37	7.4	1	14
WSU	Rickey Galvin	3	24	8.0	1	12
WSU	Marcus Mason	3	18	6.0	0	12
CSU	Charles Lovett	5	93	18.6	1	63
CSU	Craig Leonards	1	63	63.0	0	63
CSU	Jordon Vaden	8	60	7.5	1	13
CSU	Joe Hansley	4	56	14.0	0	16
CSU	Kivon Cartwright	2	51	25.5	0	51
CSU	Crockett Gillmore	4	44	11.0	0	25
CSU	Rashard Higgins	4	42	10.5	0	22
CSU	Donnell Alexander	3	17	5.7	0	9
