= Dom Williams =

American football player (born 1992)

No. 84
- Position: Wide receiver

Personal information
- Born: December 11, 1992 (age 33); Pomona, California, U.S.
- Listed height: 6 ft 2 in (1.88 m)
- Listed weight: 200 lb (91 kg)

Career information
- High school: Garey (Pomona)
- College: Washington State
- NFL draft: 2016: undrafted

Career history
- San Diego Chargers (2016)*; Philadelphia Eagles (2017); Detroit Lions (2018)*
- * Offseason or practice squad member only

Awards and highlights
- Super Bowl champion (LII)
- Stats at Pro Football Reference

Dominique Williams (born December 11, 1992) is an American former professional football wide receiver. He played college football for the Washington State Cougars. He is 6th all-time in Pac–12 for receiving touchdowns.

== Early life and education ==
Dom Williams was born on December 11, 1992.

He played college football at Washington State Cougars.

=== 2011 ===
As a freshman in 2011, Williams did not play and redshirted.

=== 2012 ===
In 2012 he played in 11 games. He had two 100-yard games that year. He made 34 receptions for 546 yards and three touchdowns.

=== 2013 ===
In 2013 he appeared in all 13 games, making 40 catches for 647 yards and 7 touchdowns. His seven touchdowns were seventh in the Pac-12. He had two 100-yard games.

=== 2014 ===
In 2014, he played in all 12 games, recording 43 catches for 656 yards and 9 touchdowns. He was 5th in Pac-12 for touchdown catches. He led the team with seven 25+ yard catches. For the third straight year, he had two 100-yard games.

=== 2015 ===
In 2015, he played 13 games, and produced 75 catches for 1040 yards and 11 touchdowns. He was third in touchdowns for Pac-12. He was 5th for receptions. He had three 100-yard games. He is sixth all-time for Pac-12 touchdowns with 30.

=== College statistics ===
| Year | Team | Games | | Receiving | | | |
| Year | Team | GP | GS | Rec | Yds | Avg | TD |
|---|---|---|---|---|---|---|---|
| 2011 | Washington State | 0 | 0 | 0 | 0 | 0 | 0 |
| 2012 | Washington State | 11 | 5 | 34 | 546 | 16.1 | 3 |
| 2013 | Washington State | 13 | 7 | 40 | 647 | 16.2 | 7 |
| 2014 | Washington State | 11 | | 43 | 656 | 15.3 | 9 |
| 2015 | Washington State | 13 | 13 | 75 | 1040 | 13.9 | 11 |
| Total | | 48 | | 192 | 2889 | 15.0 | 30 |
Source: wsucougars.com

== Professional career ==
=== Los Angeles Chargers ===
In 2016, Williams was signed by the Los Angeles Chargers. In preseason against the Arizona Cardinals, he led the team with 4 catches for 55 yards. He was released at roster cuts.

=== Philadelphia Eagles ===
On January 11, 2017, he signed with the Philadelphia Eagles. He was placed on injured reserve on May 15. He was injured all season. While he was on injured reserve, the Philadelphia Eagles beat the New England Patriots in Super Bowl LII. He was released in May 2018.

=== Detroit Lions ===
On August 3, 2018, Williams was signed by the Detroit Lions. He did not make the final roster.

== Post-football career ==
On July 1, 2022, Williams graduated from the New York City Police Academy.
