= 2011 All-Pac-12 Conference football team =

The 2011 All-Pac-12 Conference football team consists of American football players chosen by various organizations for All-Pac-12 Conference teams for the 2011 Pac-12 Conference football season. The Oregon Ducks won the conference, defeating the UCLA Bruins 49–31 in the Pac-12 Championship game. Oregon then beat the Big Ten champion Wisconsin Badgers in the Rose Bowl 45 to 38. Stanford quarterback Andrew Luck was voted Pac-12 Offensive Player of the Year. Cal linebacker Mychal Kendricks was voted Pat Tillman Pac-12 Defensive Player of the Year.

== Offensive selections ==
=== Quarterbacks ===
- Andrew Luck, Stanford (Coaches-1)
- Matt Barkley, USC (Coaches-2)

=== Running backs ===
- LaMichael James, Oregon (Coaches-1)
- Chris Polk, Washington (Coaches-1)
- Stepfan Taylor, Stanford (Coaches-2)
- John White, Utah (Coaches-2)

=== Wide receivers ===
- Robert Woods#, USC (Coaches-1)
- Keenan Allen, California (Coaches-1)
- Marqise Lee, USC (Coaches-2)
- Marquess Wilson, Washington St. (Coaches-2)

=== Tight ends ===
- Coby Fleener, Stanford (Coaches-1)
- David Paulson, Oregon (Coaches-2)

=== Tackles ===
- Matt Kalil, USC (Coaches-1)
- Jonathan Martin (Coaches-1)
- Mitchell Schwartz, California (Coaches-1)
- David Bakhtiari, Colorado (Coaches-2)

=== Guards ===
- David DeCastro, Stanford (Coaches-1)
- Tony Bergstrom, Utah (Coaches-1)
- John Cullen, Utah (Coaches-2)
- Garth Gerhart, Arizona St. (Coaches-2)

=== Centers ===
- Senio Kelemete, Washington (Coaches-2)
- Khaled Holmes, USC (Coaches-2)

== Defensive selections ==
=== Ends ===
- Dion Jordan, Oregon (Coaches-1)
- Nick Perry, USC (Coaches-1)
- Derrick Shelby, Utah (Coaches-1)
- Ben Gardner, Stanford (Coaches-2)
- Wes Horton, USC (Coaches-2)
- Trevor Guyton, Cal (Coaches-2)
- Travis Long, Washington St. (Coaches-2)

=== Tackles ===
- Star Lotulelei, Utah (Coaches-1)

=== Linebackers ===
- Josh Kaddu, Oregon (Coaches-1)
- Mychal Kendricks, California (Coaches-1)
- Chase Thomas, Stanford (Coaches-1)
- Dion Bailey, USC (Coaches-2)
- Cort Dennison, Washington (Coaches-2)
- Alex Hoffman-Ellis, Washington St. (Coaches-2)

=== Cornerbacks ===
- Nickell Robey, USC (Coaches-1)
- Jordan Poyer, Oregon St. (Coaches-2)
- John Boyett, Oregon (Coaches-2)
- Clint Floyd, Arizona St. (Coaches-2)
- Trevin Wade, Arizona (Coaches-2)

=== Safeties ===
- T. J. McDonald, USC (Coaches-1)
- Delano Howell, Stanford (Coaches-1)
- Eddie Pleasant, Oregon (Coaches-1)

== Special teams ==
=== Placekickers ===
- Andre Heidari, USC (Coaches-1)
- Jordan Williamson, Stanford (Coaches-2)

=== Punters ===
- Bryan Anger, California (Coaches-1)
- Jackson Rice, Oregon (Coaches-2)

=== Return specialists ===
- De'Anthony Thomas, Oregon (Coaches-1)
- Jamal Miles, Arizona St. (Coaches-2)

=== Special teams player ===
- Rhett Ellison, USC (Coaches-1)
- Derrick Coleman, UCLA (Coaches-2)

== Key ==
Coaches = selected by Pac-12 coaches

# = unanimous selection by coaches

== See also ==
- 2011 College Football All-America Team
