= River Cracraft =

American football player (born 1994)

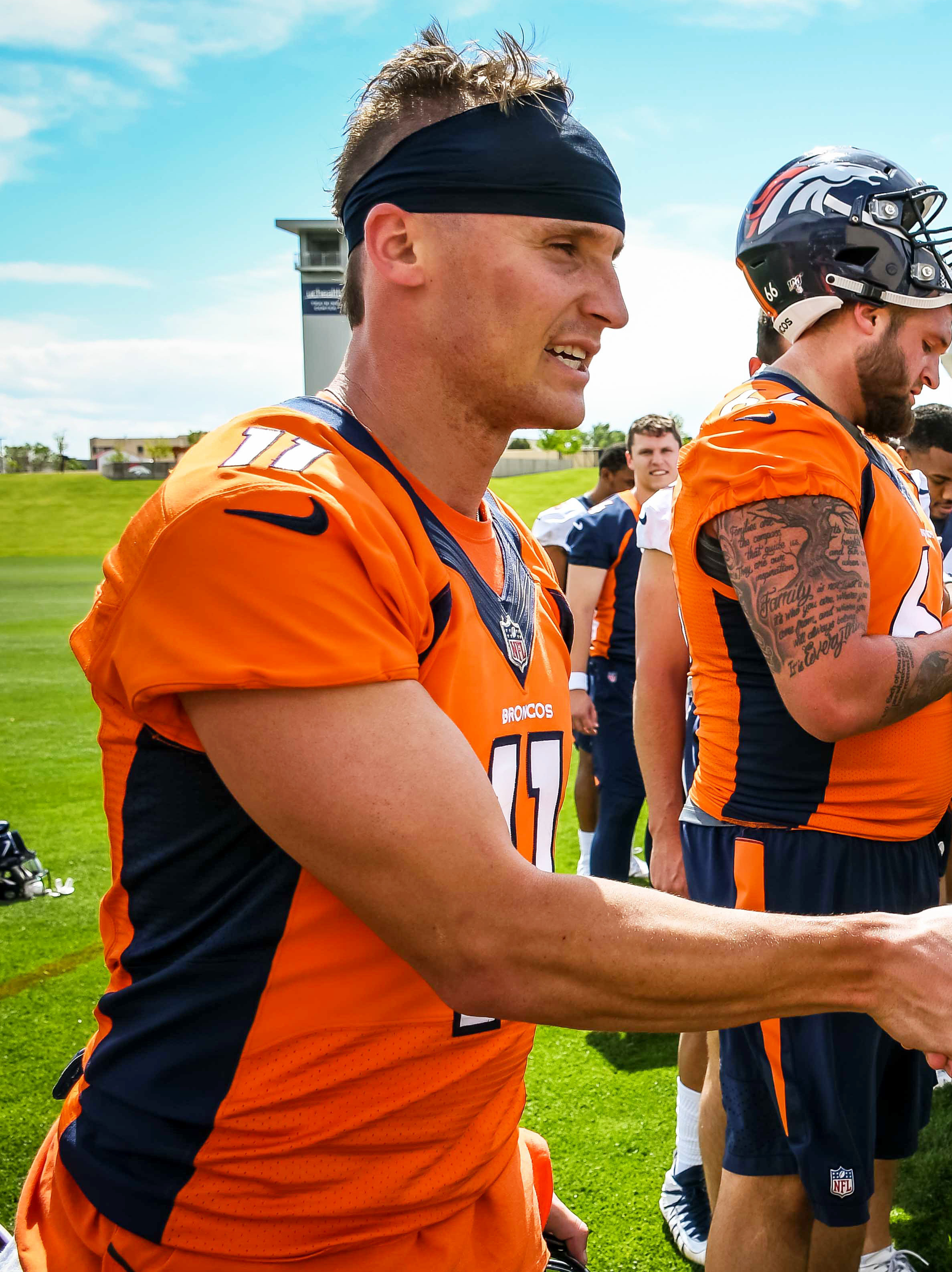
- Cracraft with the Denver Broncos in 2019

Profile
- Position: Wide receiver

Personal information
- Born: November 1, 1994 (age 32); Rancho Santa Margarita, California, U.S.
- Listed height: 6 ft 0 in (1.83 m)
- Listed weight: 198 lb (90 kg)

Career information
- High school: Santa Margarita Catholic (Rancho Santa Margarita)
- College: Washington State (2013–2016)
- NFL draft: 2017: undrafted

Career history
- Denver Broncos (2017–2019); Philadelphia Eagles (2019)*; San Francisco 49ers (2020–2021); Miami Dolphins (2022–2024); Seattle Seahawks (2025)*; Washington Commanders (2025)
- * Offseason or practice squad member only

Career NFL statistics as of 2026
- Receptions: 32
- Receiving yards: 374
- Receiving touchdowns: 3
- Stats at Pro Football Reference

River Cracraft (CRAY-craft; born November 1, 1994) is an American professional football player. He played college football for the Washington State Cougars and signed with the Denver Broncos as an undrafted free agent in 2017. Cracraft has also been a member of the Philadelphia Eagles, San Francisco 49ers, Miami Dolphins, and Seattle Seahawks. His playing position is wide receiver.

== Early life ==
Born in Rancho Santa Margarita, California on November 1, 1994, as Tanner Cracraft, his name was changed to River when he was six months old. He grew up in nearby Trabuco Canyon and attended Santa Margarita Catholic High School, where he played football, baseball, and ran track. In football, he was a four year letter winner and played both wide receiver and defensive back and was named All-State and All-Trinity League in his sophomore season after recording 35 receptions for 469 yards on offense while making 41 tackles with three interceptions on defense. He was named All-State, All-CIF and All-Trinity League as a junior after recording 46 receptions for 654 yards and six touchdowns for the Eagles. As a senior, Cracraft caught 56 passes for 935 yards and 10 touchdowns and recorded an interception with five pass breakups on defense and was named first-team All-County by the Orange County Register and the Trinity League Offensive Player of the Year. He had a total of 134 receptions while playing for the Eagles, second in school history behind former NFL receiver Brian Finneran, and finished third in school history with 2,043 receiving yards. Rated a three-star prospect by several major recruiting services and the number 91 overall prospect in California by ESPN.com, Cracraft committed to play college football at Washington State over offers from Nevada and UNLV.

== College career ==
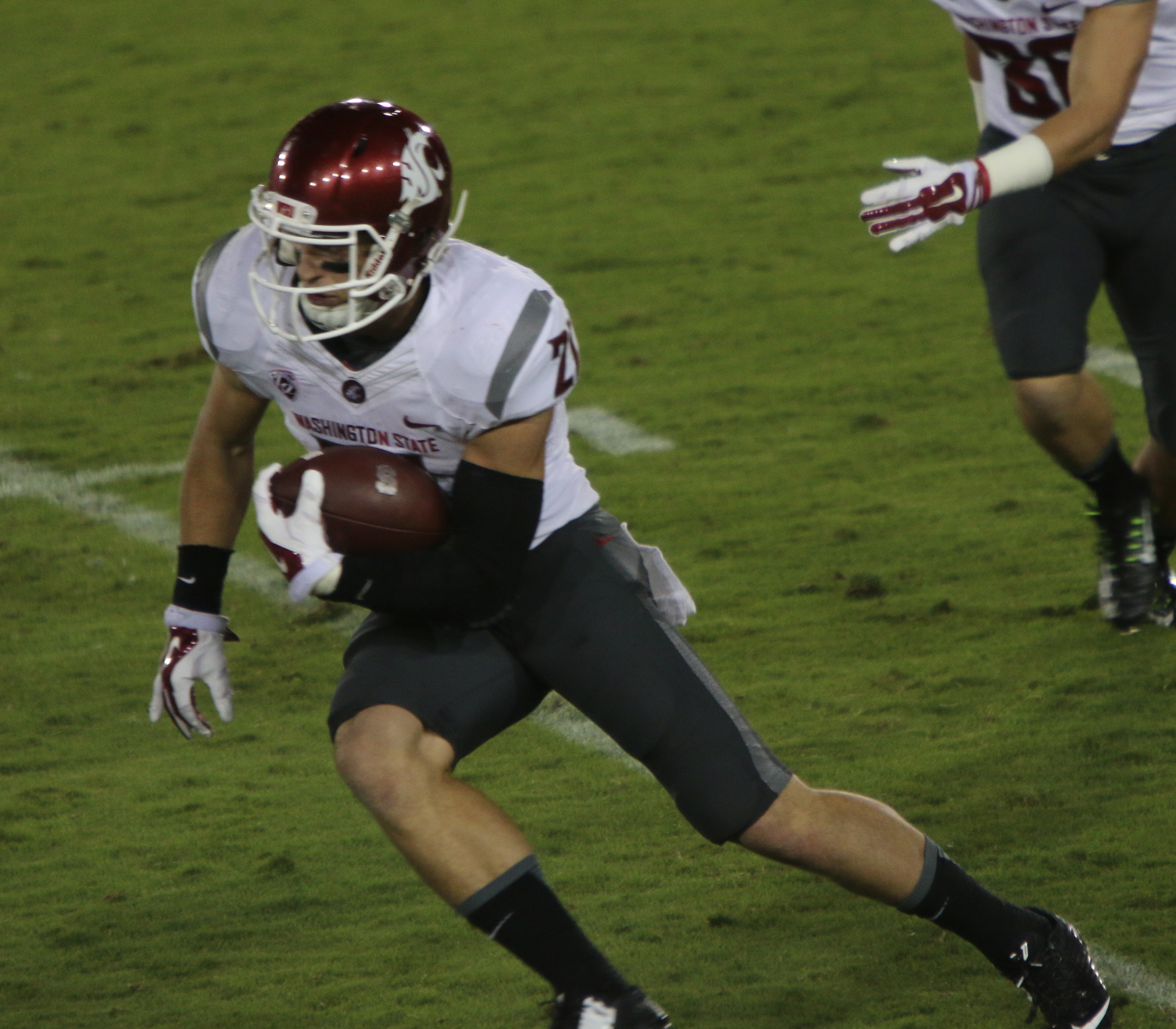
Cracraft in 2014

Cracraft played four seasons for the Cougars. He appeared in all 13 of the Cougars games as a true freshman, starting 10 and recording 46 receptions for 614 yards and three touchdowns and was named honorable mention All-Pac-12 Conference and honorable mention All-Freshman Team by College Football News. The next year, Cracraft caught 66 passes for 771 yards and eight touchdowns despite missing three games to a stress fracture in his foot. This included a career-high 172 yards and three touchdowns on 11 receptions in a 60-59 loss to California in which Washington State quarterback Connor Halliday passed for an NCAA record 734 yards. The following game, Cracraft set a school record with 14 receptions in a game, along with 100 yards and a touchdown, in a 34-17 loss to Stanford, which was both tied and then broken later in the season by teammate Vince Mayle.

Cracraft entered his junior season on the 2015 Fred Biletnikoff Award watchlist, but missed three games due to a stress fracture in his opposite foot and finished the year with 53 receptions for 615 yards and four touchdowns. He returned from his injury to play in the 2015 Sun Bowl and caught five passes for 63 yards in the Cougars' 20-14 win over the Miami Hurricanes. Cracraft had 53 receptions, 701 receiving yards and five touchdowns in his senior season and was again named honorable mention All-Pac 12 before tearing his ACL in the tenth game of the season. He recorded 218 receptions (No. 2 in school history behind teammate Gabe Marks), 2,701 receiving yards (6th) and 20 touchdowns (6th) in 42 games played while at Washington State.

== Professional career ==
Pre-draft measurables
Height	Weight	Arm length	Hand span	Wingspan	Bench press
6 ft 0 1/4 in (1.84 m)	193 lb (88 kg)	29 1/2 in (0.75 m)	8 1/2 in (0.22 m)	6 ft 3 5/8 in (1.92 m)	15 reps
All values from Pro Day

=== Denver Broncos ===
Due to his knee injury, Cracraft was unable to participate in the pre-draft process and ultimately went unselected in the 2017 NFL draft. He was not initially signed by any team as an undrafted free agent. Cracraft worked out for the New England Patriots in September 2017 following a season-ending injury to wide receiver Julian Edelman, but was not offered a contract by the team. On October 17, 2017, Cracraft was signed to the Denver Broncos' practice squad, but was released by the team three days later after sustaining an injury in practice. He was subsequently re-signed to the Broncos' practice squad on December 18, and signed a futures contract with the team at the end of the season.

Cracraft was signed to the Broncos' practice squad after being cut from the team's active roster at the end of the 2018 preseason. On September 10, 2018, he was cut from the practice squad to make room for previously-suspended wide receiver Carlos Henderson, but was re-signed on September 19. Cracraft was promoted to the Broncos' active roster on November 2 and made his NFL debut two days later in the Broncos' 19-17 loss to the Houston Texans, where he returned a punt for five yards. He caught his first career pass, a 44-yard reception, on December 30 during the Broncos' final game of the season against the Los Angeles Chargers. He finished the season with one reception for 44 yards, 12 punts returned for 40 yards (3.3 yards per return) and three kickoffs returned for 43 yards (14.3 yards per return) in eight games played.

On September 1, 2019, Cracraft was waived by the Broncos after making the initial roster out of training camp. Cracraft was re-signed by the Broncos on September 11, but waived on September 24.

=== Philadelphia Eagles ===
On December 24, 2019, Cracraft was signed to the Philadelphia Eagles' practice squad.

He signed a reserve/future contract with the Eagles on January 6, 2020, and waived on April 30.

=== San Francisco 49ers ===
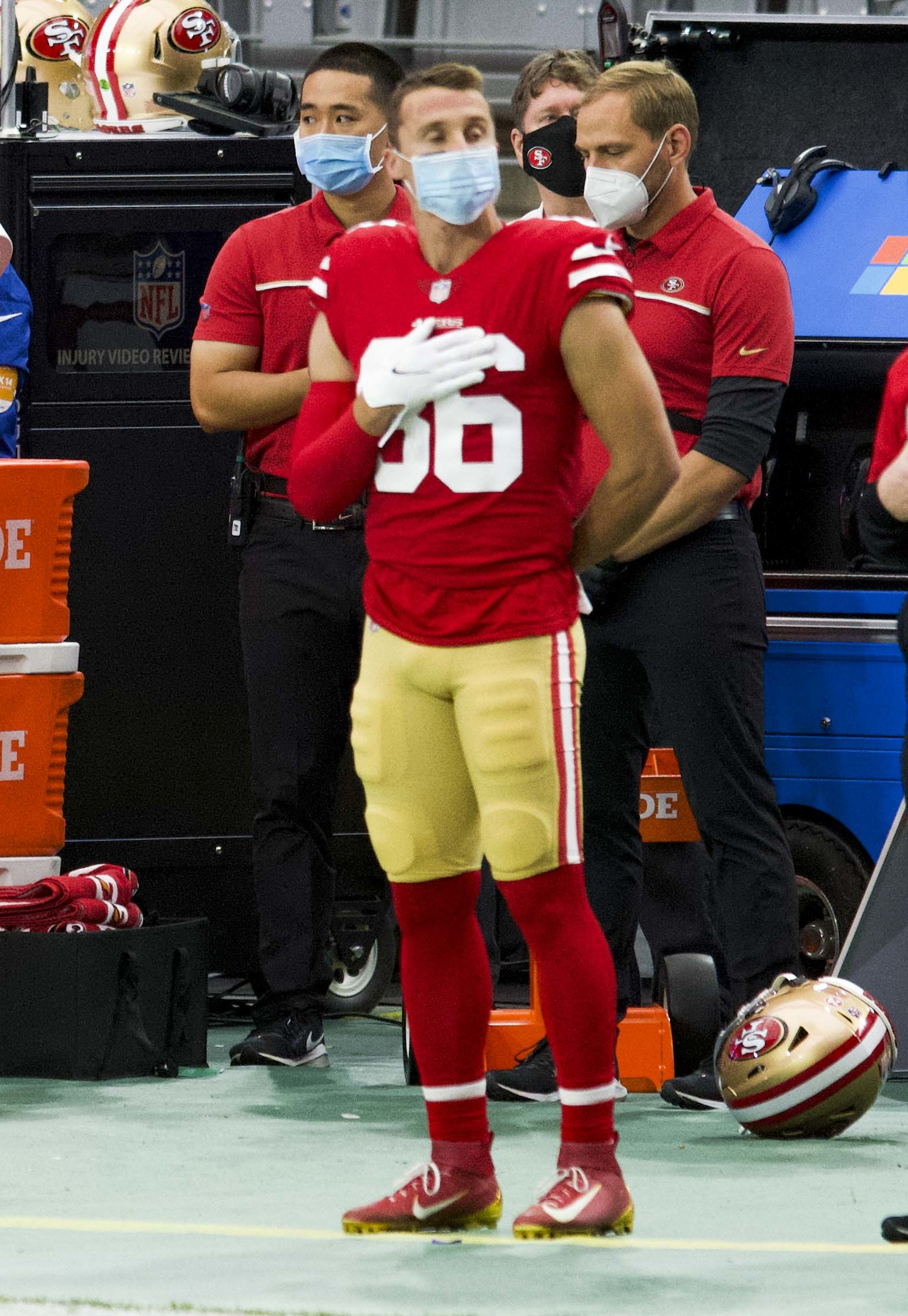
Cracraft with the San Francisco 49ers in 2020

Cracraft was signed by the 49ers on August 27, 2020. He was waived on September 5 and signed to the practice squad the following day. He was elevated to the active roster on October 31 and November 5 for the team's Weeks 8 and 9 games against the Seattle Seahawks and Green Bay Packers, being reverted to the practice squad after each game. He was then promoted to the active roster on November 9. Cracraft finished the season with six receptions for 41 yards with five punt returns for 40 yards and three tackles on special teams.

On February 22, 2021, Cracraft signed a one-year contract extension with the 49ers. He was waived on August 24, but re-signed four days later. He was waived again on August 31, and re-signed to the practice squad the next day. Cracraft was promoted to the active roster on December 11. He was waived by San Francisco on January 29, 2022.

=== Miami Dolphins ===
Cracraft was signed by the Dolphins on February 17, 2022. He was waived by the Dolphins on August 30, and re-signed to the practice squad two days later. Cracraft was elevated to the active roster on September 11 for the team's season opener against the Patriots. He was elevated the following week In the fourth quarter of Week 2, where Cracraft caught a two-yard touchdown pass from Tua Tagovailoa, the first of his career. The touchdown helped spark the Dolphins' 21-point comeback over the Baltimore Ravens in a 42-38 victory. In Week 3 against the Buffalo Bills, Cracraft caught an 11-yard touchdown pass for his second of the season, helping the Dolphins go 3-0 for the first time since the 2018 season. He was signed to the active roster on September 29.

On March 17, 2023, Cracraft re-signed with the Dolphins. He was placed on injured reserve on September 29, and activated November 14.

Cracraft was re-signed on March 21, 2024. He was placed on injured reserve on August 27, and activated on November 11.

=== Seattle Seahawks ===
On March 21, 2025, Cracraft was signed by the Seattle Seahawks. He was waived by the Seahawks on May 12.

=== Washington Commanders ===
On August 14, 2025, Cracraft signed with the Washington Commanders. On August 26, he was released due to roster cuts. The Commanders re-signed Cracraft to their practice squad on November 11. He was waived on December 9, but was re-signed to their practice squad on December 16. He was elevated to the active roster for the final two games of the regular season, and reverted to the practice squad on January 5, 2026.

On July 29, 2026, Cracraft re-signed with the Commanders. On August 18, he was placed on injured reserve, and released with an injury settlement the next day.

== Career statistics ==
=== NFL ===
==== Regular season ====
Year	Team	Games		Receiving					Kick returns					Punt returns					Tackles		
Year	Team	GP	GS	Rec	Yds	Avg	Lng	TD	Ret	Yds	Avg	Lng	TD	Ret	Yds	Avg	Lng	TD	Comb	Solo	Ast
2018	DEN	8	0	1	44	44.0	44	0	3	43	14.3	23	0	12	40	3.3	20	0	1	0	1
2019	DEN	1	0	—	—	—	—	—	—	—	—	—	—	—	—	—	—	—	—	—	—
2020	SF	9	1	6	41	6.8	12	0	—	—	—	—	—	5	40	8.0	21	0	1	1	0
2021	SF	6	0	—	—	—	—	—	—	—	—	—	—	—	—	—	—	—	3	2	1
2022	MIA	11	0	9	102	11.3	22	2	—	—	—	—	—	—	—	—	—	—	3	3	—
2023	MIA	10	1	9	121	13.4	24	1	—	—	—	—	—	—	—	—	—	—	—	—	—
2024	MIA	8	0	7	66	9.4	16	0	—	—	—	—	—	—	—	—	—	—	1	1	0
Career		53	2	32	374	11.7	44	3	3	43	14.3	23	0	17	80	21	4.7	0	9	7	2

==== Postseason ====
Year	Team	Games		Receiving					Kick returns					Punt returns					Tackles		
Year	Team	GP	GS	Rec	Yds	Avg	Lng	TD	Ret	Yds	Avg	Lng	TD	Ret	Yds	Avg	Lng	TD	Comb	Solo	Ast
2021	SF	2	0	—	—	—	—	—	—	—	—	—	—	—	—	—	—	—	—	—	—
2022	MIA	1	0	—	—	—	—	—	1	23	23.0	23	0	—	—	—	—	—	—	—	—
2023	MIA	1	0	2	33	16.5	19	0	—	—	—	—	—	—	—	—	—	—	—	—	—
Career		4	0	2	33	16.5	19	0	1	23	23.0	23	0	—	—	—	—	—	—	—	—

=== College ===
College statistics
Season	GP	GS	Receiving				Punt returns			
Season	GP	GS	Rec	Yds	Avg	TD	Ret	Yds	Avg	TD
2013	13	10	46	614	13.3	3	—	—	—	—
2014	9	8	66	771	11.7	8	4	17	4.3	0
2015	9	9	53	615	11.6	4	—	—	—	—
2016	10	9	53	701	13.2	5	—	—	—	—
Career	41	36	218	2,701	12.4	20	4	17	4.3	0

== Personal life ==
Cracraft's older brother, Skyler, walked on to the Cougars as a safety after River committed to the team despite not having played organized football since high school two years prior. Both of his parents are named Tracy; his father played baseball at Taft College.

Cracraft married his college sweetheart Taylor in Newport Beach, California, on July 1, 2022. The couple had a daughter in June 2024.
