= 1999 Washington State Cougars football team =

American college football season

1999 Washington State Cougars football
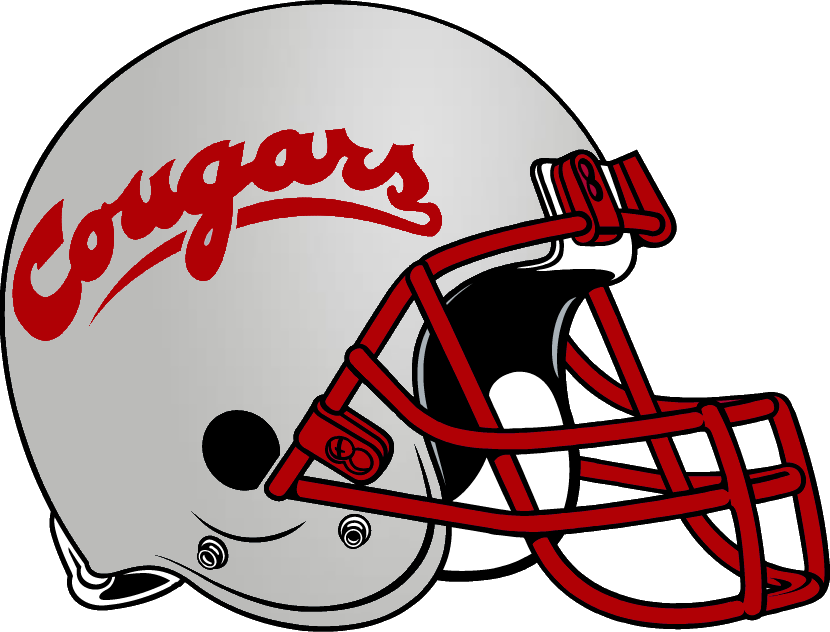
- Conference: Pacific-10 Conference
- Record: 3–9 (1–7 Pac-10)
- Head coach: Mike Price (11th season)
- Offensive coordinator: Jim McDonell (6th season)
- Offensive scheme: Spread
- Defensive coordinator: Bill Doba (6th season)
- Base defense: 4–3
- Home stadium: Martin Stadium

1999 Pacific-10 Conference football standings
	Conf.			Overall
Team	W		L	W		L
Stanford $	7	–	1	8	–	4
No. 19 Oregon	6	–	2	9	–	3
Washington	6	–	2	7	–	5
Arizona State	5	–	3	6	–	6
Oregon State	4	–	4	7	–	5
Arizona	3	–	5	6	–	6
USC	3	–	5	6	–	6
California	3	–	5	4	–	7
UCLA	2	–	6	4	–	7
Washington State	1	–	7	3	–	9
$ – BCS representative as conference champion; Cal later vacated 4 wins (3 in conference) due to NCAA sanctions.; Rankings from AP Poll

The 1999 Washington State Cougars football team represented Washington State University as a member of the Pacific-10 Conference during the 1999 NCAA Division I-A football season. Led by 11th-year head coach Mike Price, the Cougars compiled an overall record of 3–9 with a mark of 1–7 in conference play, placing last out of ten teams in the Pac-10.

== Schedule ==
Date	Time	Opponent	Site	TV	Result	Attendance	Source
September 4	1:00 pm	Utah*	Martin Stadium; Pullman, WA		L 7–27	26,179	
September 11	7:15 pm	at Stanford	Stanford Stadium; Stanford, CA	FSN	L 17–54	36,592	
September 18	1:00 pm	at Idaho*	Martin Stadium; Pullman, WA (Battle of the Palouse)		L 17–28	34,873	
September 25	1:00 pm	Arizona	Martin Stadium; Pullman, WA		L 24–30	26,787	
October 2	1:00 pm	California^{†}	Martin Stadium; Pullman, WA		W 31–7	27,682	
October 9	1:00 pm	Louisiana–Lafayette*	Martin Stadium; Pullman, WA		W 44–0	23,276	
October 23	4:00 pm	at Arizona State	Sun Devil Stadium; Tempe, AZ		L 21–33	57,537	
October 30	1:00 pm	Oregon State	Martin Stadium; Pullman, WA		L 13–27	34,240	
November 6	7:00 pm	at Oregon	Autzen Stadium; Eugene, OR	FSN	L 10–52	44,090	
November 13	4:00 pm	USC	Martin Stadium; Pullman, WA	ABC	L 28–31	23,065	
November 20	12:30 pm	at Washington	Husky Stadium; Seattle, WA (Apple Cup)	ABC	L 14–24	72,973	
November 27	8:00 pm	at Hawaii*	Aloha Stadium; Halawa, HI		W 22–14	45,382	
*Non-conference game; ^{†}Homecoming; All times are in Pacific time

== Game summaries ==
=== California ===
Team	1	2	3	4	Total
California	0	0	7	0	7
• Washington St	0	17	0	14	31

- Date: October 7
- Location: Martin Stadium, Pullman, WA
- Game start: 4:00 p.m. EST
- Elapsed time: 3:12
- Game attendance: 27,682
- Game weather: Clear; 62 °F (17 °C); wind 5–10 mph (8.0–16.1 km/h) W
- Referee: J. Stricherz

Scoring summary
Q2	9:45	WSU	Henderson 18 yard pass from Birnbaum (Lindell kick)	WSU 7–0
Q2	9:15	WSU	Lindell 40 yard field goal	WSU 10–0
Q2	6:15	WSU	Birnbaum 1 yard run (Lindell kick)	WSU 17–0
Q3	13:44	CAL	Waasdorp 25 yard fumble return (Hershey kick)	WSU 17–7
Q4	9:32	WSU	Williams 10 yard pass from Birnbaum (Lindell kick)	WSU 24–7
Q4	2:33	WSU	Burnett 24 yard run (Lindell kick)	WSU 31–7

== Roster ==
1999 Washington State Cougars football team roster
Players
Coaches
Offense

Pos.	#	Name	Class
RB	26	Alvan Arzu	Jr
QB	9	Sam Baurichter	So
QB	13	Steve Birnbaum	Sr
RB	48	Kyle Stiffarm	So

Defense

Pos.	#	Name	Class
DE	57	Serign Marong	So
DB	25	Chris Martin	Sr
DE	51	Austin Matson	Jr
DB	21	Anthony Matthews	So
DE	87	Rob Meier	Sr

Special teams

Pos.	#	Name	Class
P	9	Kareem Anderson	Sr

Head coach

- Mike Price

Coordinators/assistant coaches

Legend

- (C) Team captain
- (S) Suspended
- (I) Ineligible
- Injured
- Redshirt

Roster
Last update: 2000-04-20
