= Jerome Harrison =

American football player (born 1983)

No. 35, 33, 36
- Position: Running back

Personal information
- Born: February 26, 1983 (age 43); Kalamazoo, Michigan, U.S.
- Listed height: 5 ft 9 in (1.75 m)
- Listed weight: 205 lb (93 kg)

Career information
- High school: Central (Kalamazoo)
- College: Pasadena CC (2002–2003); Washington State (2004–2005)
- NFL draft: 2006: 5th round, 145th overall pick

Career history
- Cleveland Browns (2006–2010); Philadelphia Eagles (2010); Detroit Lions (2011)

Awards and highlights
- Consensus All-American (2005); First-team All-Pac-10 (2005)

Career NFL statistics
- Rushing yards: 1,681
- Rushing average: 4.7
- Rushing touchdowns: 7
- Receptions: 70
- Receiving yards: 490
- Receiving touchdowns: 3
- Stats at Pro Football Reference

Jerome Harrison (born February 26, 1983) is an American former professional football player who was a running back for six seasons in the National Football League (NFL). He played college football for the Washington State Cougars, earning recognition as a consensus All-American in 2005. He was selected by the Cleveland Browns in the fifth round of the 2006 NFL draft, and also played in the NFL for the Detroit Lions and Philadelphia Eagles. A brain tumor ended his career in 2011.

== Early life ==
Harrison was born in Kalamazoo, Michigan. He attended Kalamazoo Central High School, and played for the Kalamazoo Central Maroon Giants high school football team. He served as his team captain as a junior and senior, and rushed for 2,338 yards and thirty-one touchdowns as a senior, earning all-state honors from the Detroit Free-Press.

His father, Jerome Persell, was a tailback and three-time Mid-American Conference offensive player of the year (1976–1978) at Western Michigan University in Kalamazoo. He finished second in the nation in rushing behind Heisman Trophy winner Tony Dorsett in 1976. In 1978, he became the third runner in Division I-A history to reach 4,000 yards in three seasons and tied a then-NCAA record with three consecutive 200-yard performances. After receiving a sole NFL tryout, Persell was told that he was too short and too light, a remark that Harrison would encounter as well.

== College career ==
After two years at Pasadena City College, Harrison transferred to Washington State University, where he played for the Washington State Cougars football from 2004 to 2005. Although he played most of his junior year behind starter Chris Bruhn, he finished the last five games of the year with over 900 yards. His senior year saw greater playing time and great success. He broke the record for most consecutive games with 100 or more yards by a Pacific-10 Conference runner, with 16, and set the Cougars' single-season rushing record with 1,900 yards, which also led the NCAA Division I. He was a consensus All-American in 2005. He majored in humanities and communications.

== Professional career ==
Pre-draft measurables
Height	Weight	Arm length	Hand span	40-yard dash	10-yard split	20-yard split	20-yard shuttle	Three-cone drill	Vertical jump	Broad jump	Bench press
5 ft 9 1/4 in (1.76 m)	201 lb (91 kg)	30 in (0.76 m)	9 1/4 in (0.23 m)	4.49 s	1.58 s	2.63 s	4.07 s	6.77 s	34.5 in (0.88 m)	10 ft 4 in (3.15 m)	19 reps
All values from NFL Combine

=== Cleveland Browns ===
Harrison was selected by the Cleveland Browns in the fifth round (145th overall) of the 2006 NFL draft.

In his first season, he made ten appearances including one start. He made his NFL debut against the New Orleans Saints on September 10, 2006. During his second season with the Browns, Harrison appeared in eight games.

On December 20, 2009, at Kansas City, Harrison broke Jim Brown's single-game rushing record for a Cleveland Browns running back with 286 yards and three touchdowns, placing him third on the all-time single-game rushing yards list behind Adrian Peterson, who had rushed for 296 yards and three touchdowns against the San Diego Chargers in 2007, and Jamal Lewis, who had rushed for 295 yards and two touchdowns against the Browns in 2003. He maintained that form through the end of the regular season, rushing for 561 yards and five touchdowns in the last three games. Harrison signed a 1-year, $2 million contract at the end of 2009 and became the starting running back for the Browns at the start of the 2010 season.

=== Philadelphia Eagles ===
On October 13, 2010, Harrison was traded to the Philadelphia Eagles in exchange for running back Mike Bell.

=== Detroit Lions ===
On August 9, 2011, Harrison signed with the Detroit Lions. Harrison was traded back to the Eagles in exchange for running back Ronnie Brown and a seventh-round draft pick in 2013, but the trade was voided the next day after Harrison failed his physical with the Eagles. On October 20, Adam Schefter of ESPN reported that Harrison failed the physical because doctors discovered a brain tumor. He had surgery, during which the tumor was discovered to be benign, but it was surrounded by blood vessels, which led to complications. He was placed on the reserve/non-football injury list by the Lions on October 21, ending his season.

His friend and former Cleveland Browns teammate Josh Cribbs said Harrison was suffering from seizures.

On Thanksgiving 2012, CBS aired a special documenting Harrison's recovery. Harrison and his family spoke candidly about his harrowing journey. In it he, his wife and mother mention that he was expected to be a quadriplegic, but he had been very tenacious in his recovery and has regained many of his motor skills.

=== Career statistics ===
		Rushing						Receiving			
Season	Team	GP	Att	Yds	Avg	Long	TD	Rec	Yds	Long	TD
2006	Cleveland Browns	10	20	60	3.0	15	0	9	47	12	0
2007	Cleveland Browns	8	23	142	6.2	17	0	2	19	15	0
2008	Cleveland Browns	15	34	248	7.2	72T	1	12	116	23	1
2009	Cleveland Browns	14	194	862	4.4	71T	5	34	220	18	2
2010	Cleveland Browns	4	31	91	2.9	39	0	4	42	23	0
2010	Philadelphia Eagles	8	40	239	6.0	50T	1	8	43	15	0
2011	Detroit Lions	4	14	41	2.9	9	0	1	3	3	0
	Career	63	356	1,681	4.7	72T	7	70	490	23	3

== Personal life ==
Harrison is married to Michelle. They have three children, Jiselle, Jerome and Joelle.
