= DeWayne Patterson =

American football player (born 1984)

No. 21
- Position: Safety

Personal information
- Born: April 20, 1984 (age 42); Redlands, California, U.S.
- Listed height: 6 ft 0 in (1.83 m)
- Listed weight: 220 lb (100 kg)

Career information
- High school: Redlands (CA)
- College: Washington State
- NFL draft: 2006: undrafted

Career history
- Wenatchee Valley Venom (2010); Utah Blaze (2011); Everett Raptors (2012)

Career AFL statistics
- Tackles: 11.5
- Stats at ArenaFan.com

DeWayne Patterson (born April 20, 1984) is an American former football safety. He was signed by the Utah Blaze as a free agent in 2011. Patterson was born in Redlands, California. He attended Chaffey College from 2003 through 2005 where he was named a preseason All-American. He attended Washington State University, where he lettered in Football at the safety position alongside former NFL players Eric Frampton and Husain Abdullah from 2005 through 2007.

== Early life ==
Patterson attended Redlands High School, where he lettered three times in football, three times in track and field, and once in basketball. Served as a team captain as a senior and earned All-League and All-County honors…Led his team to a league title and a No. 2 state ranking with an 11-1 overall record while producing 85 tackles and two interceptions He was also captained the track and field squad and captured the league title in the long jump.

== College career ==
=== Chaffey ===
==== 2003 ====
Registered 50 tackles, 12 tackles for loss and two interceptions.

==== 2004 ====
Patterson started the 2004 season being named a Preseason All-American. He collected 90 tackles and three interceptions on his way to an All-Foothill Conference first-team selection.

College recruiting
Name	Hometown	School	Height	Weight	40^{‡}	Commit date
DeWayne Patterson; CB	Redlands, California	Redlands High School	6 ft 2 in (1.88 m)	195 lb (88 kg)	4.4	Jan 5, 2005
DeWayne Patterson; CB	Recruit ratings: Scout: Rivals:					
Overall recruit ranking: Scout: -- (S) Rivals: -- (CB), -- (CA)
‡ Refers to 40-yard dash; Note: In many cases, Scout, Rivals, 247Sports, On3, and ESPN may conflict in their listings of height, weight and 40 time.; In these cases, the average was taken. ESPN grades are on a 100-point scale.; Sources: "2005 Team Ranking". Rivals.com.

Patterson committed to Washington State University on January 5, 2005. Patterson was heavily recruited, as he also had two other FBS scholarship offers from BYU and UTEP.

=== 2005 ===
Patterson played in 10 games and started the first two contests of the season. Totaled 24 tackles with a 10-yard sack, one forced fumble and one pass breakup.

== Professional career ==
=== Wenatchee Valley Venom ===
Patterson played in 13 games with Wenatchee Valley Venom of the Indoor Football League and registered 58.0 tackles, including a nine-yard sack and 3.5 stops for losses totaling 25 yards. He also gained 45 yards on two interceptions and 25 yards on two fumble recoveries. In addition, he had 16 pass breakup and two forced fumbles.

=== Utah Blaze ===
Patterson was signed by the Blaze as a free agent on October 4, 2010. He appeared in just one game and collected 5 tackles. He re-signed with the Blaze for the 2012 season.
