= Marquess Wilson =

American gridiron football player (born 1992)

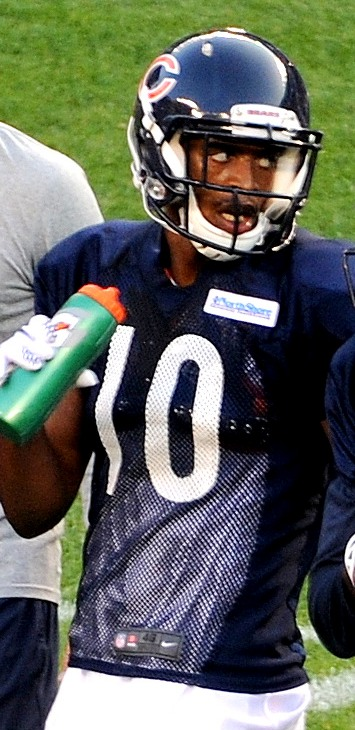
- Wilson with the Chicago Bears in 2014

No. 10
- Position: Wide receiver

Personal information
- Born: September 14, 1992 (age 34); Tulare, California, U.S.
- Listed height: 6 ft 4 in (1.93 m)
- Listed weight: 206 lb (93 kg)

Career information
- High school: Tulare Union
- College: Washington State (2010–2012
- NFL draft: 2013: 7th round, 236th overall pick

Career history
- Chicago Bears (2013–2016); New York Jets (2017)*; Philadelphia Eagles (2018)*; BC Lions (2019)*
- * Offseason or practice squad member only

Awards and highlights
- Second-team All-Pac-12 (2011)

Career NFL statistics
- Receptions: 56
- Receiving yards: 777
- Receiving touchdowns: 3
- Stats at Pro Football Reference

Marquess Willis Wilson (born September 14, 1992) is an American former professional football player who was a wide receiver in the National Football League (NFL). He played college football for the Washington State Cougars and was selected by the Chicago Bears in the seventh round in the 2013 NFL draft.

== College career ==
Wilson played wide receiver at Washington State University from 2010 to 2012 where he set the school's all-time receiving yardage record. As a freshman in 2010, he caught 55 passes for 1,001 yards, the third-highest total in the Pacific-10 Conference behind Juron Criner and Jeff Maehl. In July 2011, he was named to the 2011 Fred Biletnikoff Award preseason watch list. On October 1, 2011, he caught a 63-yard touchdown pass with 1:10 left in the game to give Washington State a 31–27 win over Colorado.

Through the first 11 games of the 2011 season, Wilson had 1,280 receiving yards and 10 touchdown receptions. As of November 20, 2011, Wilson's 1,280 receiving yards during the 2011 season ranked first in the Pac-12 Conference and fourth among all NCAA Division I FBS players.

In 2012, Wilson led the team with 52 catches for 813 yards and five touchdowns, but was suspended for one game after reportedly leaving a practice. Wilson later left the team after citing abuse by head coach Mike Leach and his staff, but he later recanted his allegations.

== Professional career ==
Pre-draft measurables
Height	Weight	Arm length	Hand span	40-yard dash	20-yard shuttle	Three-cone drill	Vertical jump	Broad jump	Bench press
6 ft 2 5/8 in (1.90 m)	194 lb (88 kg)	31 1/8 in (0.79 m)	9 1/4 in (0.23 m)	4.51 s	4.33 s	6.65 s	34 1/2 in (0.88 m)	10 ft 2 in (3.10 m)	7 reps
All values from NFL Scouting Combine

=== Chicago Bears ===
Wilson was selected by the Chicago Bears in the seventh round (236th overall) of the 2013 NFL draft.

On May 2, 2013, Wilson signed a four-year contract with the Bears. Wilson recorded his first catch on October 20, 2013 against the New York Giants. On December 29, 2013, Wilson had his first start in the final game of the 2013 season versus the Green Bay Packers.

During training camp on August 4, 2014, Wilson suffered a broken clavicle. He would be placed on injured reserve/recall on September 2, 2014. On November 14, 2014, he was activated from injured reserve. On December 15, 2014, Wilson caught his first career touchdown in Week 14 against the New Orleans Saints. On December 21, 2014, Wilson caught a career-high 7 receptions for a career-high 66 yards against the Detroit Lions. At just 22 years old, Wilson was the third youngest player on the Bears final 2014 53-man roster behind cornerback Al Louis-Jean and running back Ka'Deem Carey.

On September 13, 2015, Wilson caught a career-long 50 yard pass against the Green Bay Packers. On November 22, 2015, Wilson caught a career-high 102 yards on four receptions against the Denver Broncos. On December 12, 2015, he was placed on injured reserve. On December 14, 2015, Wilson underwent surgery on his broken foot.

Wilson broke his feet again the following offseason in June and opened the 2016 season on the PUP list. He was activated to the active roster on November 15 prior to Week 11. On November 27 against the Tennessee Titans, he had eight receptions for 125 yards and a touchdown. He was placed on injured reserve on December 17, 2016 after fracturing his foot for a third time. In the 2016 season, he appeared in three games and had nine receptions for 160 yards and a touchdown.

=== New York Jets ===
On June 20, 2017, Wilson signed with the New York Jets. He was released on August 23, 2017.

=== Philadelphia Eagles ===
On January 2, 2018, Wilson signed a futures contract with the Philadelphia Eagles. He was released on July 24, 2018.

=== BC Lions ===
On January 29, 2019, Wilson signed with the BC Lions of the Canadian Football League. On May 18, 2019, he was cut after rookie camp.
