= Ken Grandberry =

American football player (1952–2022)

No. 47
- Position: Running back

Personal information
- Born: January 25, 1952; Waco, Texas, U.S.
- Died: February 27, 2022 (aged 70); San Antonio, Texas, U.S.
- Listed height: 6 ft 0 in (1.83 m)
- Listed weight: 195 lb (88 kg)

Career information
- College: Washington State
- NFL draft: 1974: 8th round, 190th overall pick

Career history
- Chicago Bears (1974)

Awards and highlights
- Second-team All-Pac-8 (1972)

Career NFL statistics
- Rushing yards: 475
- Average: 3.6
- Touchdowns: 2
- Stats at Pro Football Reference

Kenneth James Grandberry (January 25, 1952 – February 27, 2022) was an American professional football player who was a running back in the National Football League (NFL). He was selected by the Chicago Bears in the eighth round of the 1974 NFL draft. He played college football for the Washington State Cougars.

In his lone season in the NFL, Grandberry led the Bears in rushing with 475 yards and two touchdowns on 144 carries. The following year, future Pro Football Hall of Famer Walter Payton was drafted.

Grandberry died on the February 27, 2022 at the age of 70.
