= Travis Long =

American football player (born 1991)

No. 57
- Position: Linebacker

Personal information
- Born: July 24, 1991 (age 35); Spokane, Washington, U.S.
- Listed height: 6 ft 4 in (1.93 m)
- Listed weight: 255 lb (116 kg)

Career information
- College: Washington State
- NFL draft: 2013: undrafted

Career history
- Philadelphia Eagles (2013−2015)

Awards and highlights
- Second-team All-Pac-12 (2011)
- Stats at Pro Football Reference

Travis Marshall Long (born July 24, 1991) is an American former professional football player who was a linebacker for the Philadelphia Eagles of the National Football League (NFL). He played college football for the Washington State Cougars.

== Early life ==
Long attended Gonzaga Prep High School in Spokane, Washington. He was selected to the All-Greater Spokane League Second Team in his sophomore season in high school. During high school, he was a Tacoma News Tribune Northwest Nugget honorable mention. He was selected to the Associated Press 4-A All-State First Team and was named to the Seattle Times All-State Team as a defensive lineman. He was named as the GSL Co-Defensive Player of the Year with his future Washington State Cougar teammate Chris Mastin.

College recruiting
| Name | Hometown | School | Height | Weight | 40^{‡} | Commit date |
|---|---|---|---|---|---|---|
| Travis Long; Defensive end | Spokane, Washington | Gonzaga Prep | 6 ft 4 in (1.93 m) | 235 lb (107 kg) | 4.78 | Jan 6, 2009 |
| Travis Long; Defensive end | Recruit ratings: Scout: Rivals: | | | | | |
Overall recruit ranking: Scout: 42 (TE) Rivals: NR (DE), NR (National), 13 (Washington)
‡ Refers to 40-yard dash; Note: In many cases, Scout, Rivals, 247Sports, On3, and ESPN may conflict in their listings of height, weight and 40 time.; In these cases, the average was taken. ESPN grades are on a 100-point scale.; Sources: "2009 Washington State Football Commitments". Rivals.; "2009 Washington State Football Recruiting Commits". Scout.; "Scout.com Team Recruiting Rankings". Scout.; "2009 Team Ranking". Rivals.com.

== College career ==
Long played college football at Washington State University. He was an honorable mention All-Pacific-10 Conference in his freshman and sophomore seasons. He was the recipient of the Leon Bender award during his sophomore season. He was selected to the Second-Team All-Pac-12 and Phil Steele's All-Pac-12 Conference second team in his junior season. He was named to the Pac-12 All-Academic Second Team and also was named WSU's defensive MVP following his senior season. He was the recipient of the Laurie Niemi Award in his senior season. On November 26, 2012, he was named as an All-Pac-12 Conference honorable mention following the conclusion of his senior season. On December 19, 2012, he was selected as the inaugural 2012 Kathi Goertzen Coug of the Year. He finished college with a total of 201 tackles, 20.5 sacks, 11 pass deflections, 4 forced fumbles and one interception.

== Professional career ==
Pre-draft measurables
| Height | Weight | Arm length | Hand span |
|---|---|---|---|
| 6 ft 3 3/4 in (1.92 m) | 243 lb (110 kg) | 32 5/8 in (0.83 m) | 8 3/4 in (0.22 m) |
All values from Pro Day

=== Philadelphia Eagles ===
Long signed with the Philadelphia Eagles as an undrafted free agent on July 29, 2013. On August 31, 2013, Long was cut. On September 1, 2013, Long was added to the Eagles' practice squad. On January 6, 2014, Long signed a reserve/future contract with the Eagles.

He tore his ACL in the fourth and final preseason game of the 2014 NFL season. He was placed on injured reserve on August 30, 2014.

Almost a year after his injury, Long tore the same ACL on August 3, 2015. He was placed on injured reserve and will miss his second straight season.

On July 27, 2016, Long was released.
