= 2011 Washington State Cougars football team =

American college football season

2011 Washington State Cougars football
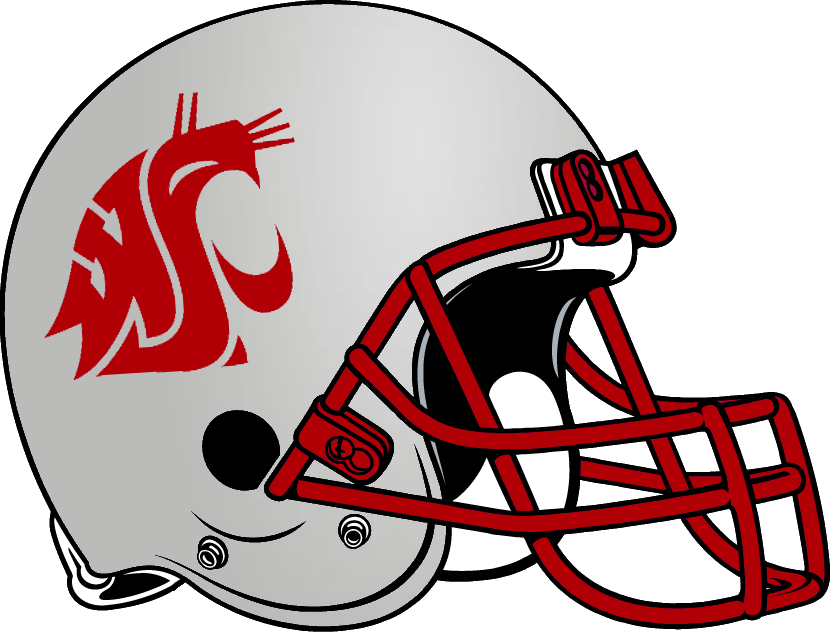

- Conference: Pac-12 Conference
- North Division
- Record: 4–8 (2–7 Pac-12)
- Head coach: Paul Wulff (4th season)
- Offensive coordinator: Todd Sturdy (4th season)
- Offensive scheme: Spread
- Defensive coordinator: Chris Ball (4th season)
- Base defense: Multiple
- Home stadium: Martin Stadium

2011 Pac-12 Conference football standings
	Conf.			Overall
Team	W		L	W		L
North Division
No. 4 Oregon xy$	8	–	1	12	–	2
No. 7 Stanford x%	8	–	1	11	–	2
Washington	5	–	4	7	–	6
California	4	–	5	7	–	6
Oregon State	3	–	6	3	–	9
Washington State	2	–	7	4	–	8
South Division
No. 6 USC †	7	–	2	10	–	2
UCLA xy	5	–	4	6	–	8
Utah	4	–	5	8	–	5
Arizona State	4	–	5	6	–	7
Arizona	2	–	7	4	–	8
Colorado	2	–	7	3	–	10
Championship: Oregon 49, UCLA 31
$ – BCS representative as conference champion; % – BCS at-large representative; x – Division champion/co-champions; y – Championship game participant; † – USC ineligible for championship and postseason due to NCAA sanctions; Rankings from AP Poll

The 2011 Washington State Cougars football team represented Washington State University in the 2011 NCAA Division I FBS football season. The team was coached by fourth year head coach Paul Wulff and played their home games at Martin Stadium in Pullman, Washington. They are members of the North Division of the Pac-12 Conference. They finished the season at 4–8 overall, 2–7 in Pac-12, and last place in the North Division.

At the end of the season, Wulff was fired after going 9–40 (.184) in four seasons and 4–32 (.111) in conference play. Former Texas Tech head coach Mike Leach succeeded him in late November and led the Cougars for the next eight seasons.

== Schedule ==
Date	Time	Opponent	Site	TV	Result	Attendance	Source
September 3	2:00 pm	Idaho State*	Martin Stadium; Pullman, WA		W 64–21	22,034	
September 10	2:00 pm	UNLV*	Martin Stadium; Pullman, WA		W 59–7	27,018	
September 17	3:00 pm	at San Diego State*	Qualcomm Stadium; San Diego, CA	The Mtn.	L 24–42	57,286	
October 1	12:30 pm	at Colorado	Folsom Field; Boulder, CO	FCS	W 31–27	51,928	
October 8	7:30 pm	at UCLA	Rose Bowl; Pasadena, CA	FSN	L 25–28	64,217	
October 15	4:30 pm	No. 7 Stanford^{†}	Martin Stadium; Pullman, WA	Versus	L 14–44	30,843	
October 22	7:30 pm	vs. Oregon State	CenturyLink Field; Seattle, WA	FSN	L 21–44	49,219	
October 29	12:00 pm	at No. 7 Oregon	Autzen Stadium; Eugene, OR	FSN	L 28–43	59,126	
November 5	3:30 pm	at California	AT&T Park; San Francisco, CA	RTNW	L 7–30	35,506	
November 12	7:30 pm	Arizona State	Martin Stadium; Pullman, WA	Versus	W 37–27	27,213	
November 19	2:00 pm	Utah	Martin Stadium; Pullman, WA	FCS	L 27–30 ^{OT}	16,419	
November 26	4:30 pm	at Washington	CenturyLink Field; Seattle, WA (Apple Cup)	Versus	L 21–38	64,559	
*Non-conference game; ^{†}Homecoming; Rankings from AP Poll released prior to the game; All times are in Pacific time

== Game summaries ==
=== Idaho State ===
Team	1	2	3	4	Total
Idaho State	0	0	21	0	21
• Washington State	23	17	21	3	64

- Date: September 3
- Location: Martin Stadium, Pullman, Washington

Washington State backup quarterback Marshall Lobbestael threw for 230 yards and two touchdowns as Washington State defeated Idaho State 64–21 on September 3. Starting quarterback Jeff Tuel only played one series in the game due to a break in his clavicle that occurred at an unknown point in the game, and he missed the opening series of the game because of a stomach virus. Despite the injury, Washington State scored on its first four possessions against the Bengals, and they built a 23–0 lead in the first quarter and a 40–0 lead by halftime. After the Cougars took a 47–0 lead in the third quarter, Idaho State scored when running back Jahmel Rover ran in from 3 yards to cap a 73-yard drive. Rover ran in a second touchdown with 4:21 left in the third to bring Idaho State within 54–14. The game was the first time the Cougars scored 60 or more points in a game since a 63–37 win over Southwest Louisiana in 1997.

=== UNLV ===
Team	1	2	3	4	Total
UNLV	0	0	0	7	7
• Washington State	14	21	10	14	59

- Date: September 10
- Location: Martin Stadium, Pullman, Washington

=== San Diego State ===
Team	1	2	3	4	Total
Washington State	10	7	7	0	24
• San Diego State	14	0	7	21	42

- Date: September 17
- Location: Qualcomm Stadium, San Diego

=== Colorado ===
Team	1	2	3	4	Total
• Washington State	7	3	7	14	31
Colorado	3	10	7	7	27

- Date: October 1
- Location: Folsom Field, Boulder, Colorado
- Game start: 3:30 p.m. EST

Scoring summary
1	3:57	WSU	Carl Winston 2-yard run (Andrew Furney kick)	WSU 7–0
1	0:44	COL	Will Oliver 48-yard field goal	WSU 7–3
2	9:16	COL	Paul Richardson 9-yard pass from Tyler Hansen (Will Oliver kick)	COL 10–7
2	0:21	WSU	Andrew Furney 28-yard field goal	Tied 10–10
2	0:00	COL	Will Oliver 48-yard field goal	COL 13–10
3	10:01	COL	Toney Clemons 4-yard pass from Tyler Hansen (Will Oliver kick)	COL 20–10
3	6:27	WSU	Jared Byers 11-yard pass from Marshall Lobbestael (Andrew Furney kick)	COL 20–17
4	5:11	COL	Rodney Stewart 1-yard run (Will Oliver kick)	COL 27–17
4	2:35	WSU	Isiah Barton 19-yard pass from Marshall Lobbestael (Andrew Furney kick)	COL 27–24
4	1:10	WSU	Marquess Wilson 63-yard pass from Marshall Lobbestael (Andrew Furney kick)	WSU 31–27

=== UCLA ===
Team	1	2	3	4	Total
Washington State	3	6	7	9	25
• UCLA	0	7	7	14	28

- Date: October 8
- Location: Rose Bowl, Pasadena, California

UCLA leads Washington State 38–18–1 in this series started in 1928. At the Rose Bowl, the Bruins are 8–5 on the Cougars.

Scoring summary

Quarter	Time	Drive			Team	Scoring information	Score	
Quarter	Time	Plays	Yards	TOP	Team	Scoring information	Washington State	UCLA
1	9:09	16	76	5:51	Washington St	21-yard field goal by Andrew Furney	3	0
2	13:32	12	53	5:13	Washington St	26-yard field goal by Andrew Furney	6	0
2	7:03	13	84	6:23	UCLA	Derrick Coleman 1-yard touchdown run, Tyler Gonzalez kick good	6	7
2	1:56	14	54	5:00	Washington St	21-yard field goal by Andrew Furney	9	7
3	12:22	6	61	2:33	UCLA	Derrick Coleman 1-yard touchdown run, Tyler Gonzalez kick good	9	14
3	8:42	8	41	3:33	Washington St	Jared Karstetter 8-yard touchdown reception from Marshall Lobbestael, Andrew Furney kick good	16	14
4	12:25	10	72	4:02	Washington St	Rickey Gavin 21-yard touchdown reception from Marshall Lobbestael, Andrew Furney kick no good (blocked)	22	14
4	10:52	4	63	1:25	UCLA	Josh Smith 9-yard touchdown reception from Kevin Prince, 2-point pass failed	22	20
4	5:49	11	58	4:57	Washington St	47-yard field goal by Andrew Furney	25	20
4	3:26	5	71	2:19	UCLA	Shaquelle Evans 7-yard touchdown reception from Kevin Prince, 2-point pass good (Kevin Prince to Nelson Rosario)	25	27
"TOP" = time of possession. For other American football terms, see Glossary of American football.							25	27

=== Stanford ===
Team	1	2	3	4	Total
• Stanford	3	7	14	20	44
Washington State	0	7	0	7	14

- Date: October 15
- Location: Martin Stadium, Pullman, Washington

Homecoming

=== Oregon State ===
Team	1	2	3	4	Total
• Oregon State	7	17	7	13	44
Washington State	0	14	0	7	21

- Date: October 22
- Location: CenturyLink Field, Seattle

=== Oregon ===
Team	1	2	3	4	Total
Washington State	0	10	10	8	28
• Oregon	8	7	21	7	43

- Date: October 29
- Location: Autzen Stadium, Eugene, Oregon

=== California ===
Team	1	2	3	4	Total
Washington State	0	0	0	7	7
• California	13	10	7	0	30

- Date: November 5
- Location: AT&T Park, San Francisco

=== Arizona State ===
Team	1	2	3	4	Total
Arizona State	7	13	7	0	27
• Washington State	6	10	7	14	37

- Date: November 12
- Location: Martin Stadium, Pullman, Washington
- Game start: 10:30 p.m. EST

Scoring summary
1	14:47	ASU	Jamal Miles 95-yard kickoff return (Alex Garroutte kick)	ASU 7–0
1	6:35	WSU	Marquess Wilson 85-yard pass from Connor Halliday (run failed)	ASU 7–6
2	14:51	ASU	Alex Garroutte 39-yard field goal	ASU 10–6
2	12:32	WSU	Andrew Furney 39-yard field goal	ASU 10–9
2	7:15	ASU	Alex Garroutte 22-yard field goal	ASU 13–9
2	1:15	WSU	Marquess Wilson 23-yard pass from Connor Halliday (Andrew Furney kick)	WSU 16–13
2	0:13	ASU	Cameron Marshall 2-yard run (Alex Garroutte kick)	ASU 20–16
3	6:40	WSU	Marquess Wilson 19-yard pass from Connor Halliday (Andrew Furney kick)	WSU 23–20
3	4:11	ASU	Gerell Robinson 16-yard pass from Brock Osweiler (Alex Garroutte kick)	ASU 27–23
4	8:55	WSU	Isiah Barton 17-yard pass from Connor Halliday (Andrew Furney kick)	WSU 30–27
4	1:50	WSU	Carl Winston 1-yard run (Andrew Furney kick)	WSU 37–27

=== Utah ===
Team	1	2	3	4	OT	Total
• Utah	0	7	3	17	3	30
Washington State	0	7	3	17	0	27

- Date: November 19
- Location: Martin Stadium, Pullman, Washington

Senior Day

=== Washington ===
Team	1	2	3	4	Total
Washington State	0	14	7	0	21
• Washington	14	7	7	10	38

- Date: November 26
- Location: CenturyLink Field, Seattle
