= Vince Mayle =

American football player (born 1991)

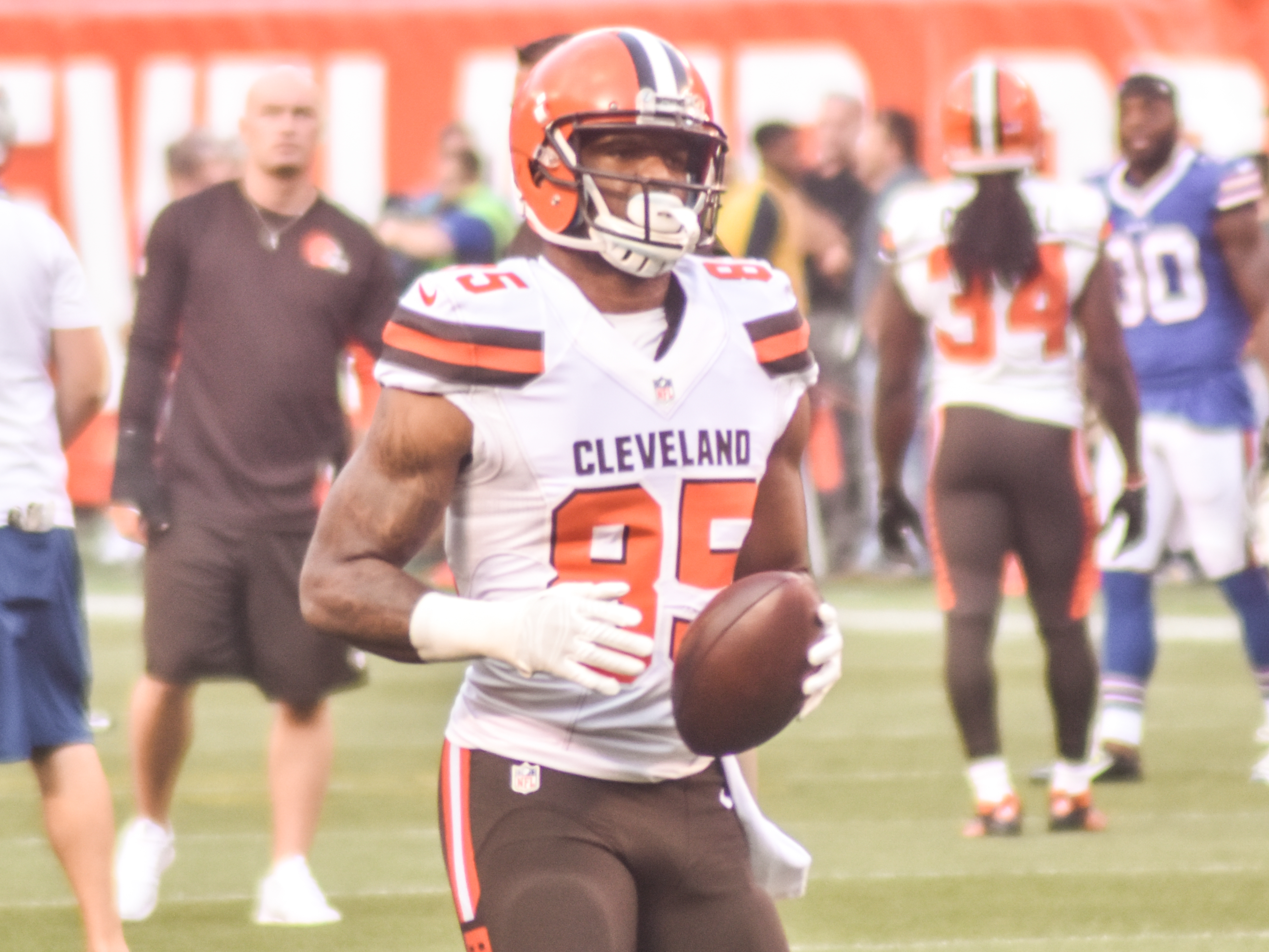
- Mayle with the Cleveland Browns in 2015

No. 85, 16, 88
- Position: Wide receiver

Personal information
- Born: June 12, 1991 (age 35); Sacramento, California, U.S.
- Listed height: 6 ft 2 in (1.88 m)
- Listed weight: 247 lb (112 kg)

Career information
- High school: Inderkum (Sacramento)
- College: Washington State
- NFL draft: 2015: 4th round, 123rd overall pick

Career history
- Cleveland Browns (2015)*; Dallas Cowboys (2015–2016); Baltimore Ravens (2016–2017); Los Angeles Chargers (2018–2019); Toronto Argonauts (2020–2021)*
- * Offseason or practice squad member only

Awards and highlights
- Second-team All-Pac-12 (2014)

Career NFL statistics
- Rushing yards: 2
- Return yards: 43
- Total touchdowns: 1
- Stats at Pro Football Reference

Vincent Jerome Mayle (/ˈmeɪliː/ MAY-lee; born June 12, 1991) is an American former professional football player who was a wide receiver in the National Football League (NFL). He played college basketball for Shasta College, and college football for Sierra College and the Washington State Cougars.

== Early life ==
Vincent Mayle was born June 12, 1991, in Sacramento, California, to Renee Mayle. He has two older siblings: a sister, Tinea, and a brother, John. He was raised in a single-parent household in Natomas, California, a suburb of Sacramento. Tinea Mayle described him as ambitious but quiet, preferring to shock people with his actions and achievements rather than tell them about himself.

Mayle grew up wanting to be a basketball player. He idolized LeBron James as a child, and earned the nickname "Little LeBron" in the sixth grade for his ability to mimic James' playing style. When he was 11 years old, Mayle obtained James' autograph at the 2003 ESPY Awards—the first autograph Mayle ever got. (Note: Mayle has often been mistaken for LeBron James, whom he strongly resembles. He was pleased to be picked by the Cleveland Browns in the 2015 NFL Draft, in part, because James played for the Cleveland Cavaliers.) Mayle did not play football until he began attending Inderkum High School. In the 2008 season (his senior year), Mayle played running back on offense and linebacker on defense. He scored 15 touchdowns that year. Mayle later admitted that despite his success on the football field, he almost never watched football on television.

Mayle was not a good student, however, and although he graduated high school in 2009 his grades were so poor that he was not eligible under NCAA rules to play sports at a four-year college or university.

== College career ==
=== Junior college ===
Mayle subsequently enrolled at Shasta College, a community college in Redding, California, where he played college basketball for a year. But as a 6-foot-2-inch (1.88 m) power forward, Mayle discovered he was too small and his peers too skilled for him to have much of a career playing basketball. Nevertheless, he averaged 8 points per game. When his mother suffered an accident in the summer of 2010, Mayle took a year off from school to care for her and worked several jobs to earn income. During his year off from school, Mayle decided to give up basketball for football, convinced it would get him farther in life. Deciding he would compete at the highest level possible, he began lifting weights to transform his body from the lean form required for basketball into the much more muscular physique needed for football while he continued to care for his mother.

In the fall of 2011, Mayle returned to school, enrolling at Sierra College, a community college in Rocklin, California. He took a year off from sports in order to focus on academics, and his grades markedly improved. In the fall of 2012, his high school football coach convinced him to return to playing football. Mayle did so, Sierra College head coach Jeff Tisdel put the then-240-pound (110 kg) Mayle at wide receiver (after considering making him a defensive end, linebacker, and tight end). Mayle had 61 receptions for 984 yards (900 m) in the 2012 season, second-best in the state. His 16 touchdowns were the best of all receivers among all junior colleges in California, and he was named Valley Conference offensive Most Valuable Player and All-California Most Valuable Player. He also won a position on the Valley Conference First Team, All-State First Team, and Football All-American Junior College First Team. Mayle's focus on football could waver at times, and he too often allowed his athleticism compensate for skill or knowledge about the defense. Tisdel benched him for a game after Mayle dropped four passes in practice. The punishment brought his attention back to the field, and he caught four touchdowns in the next game. Determined to move up to a four-year college, Mayle continued to get good grades and took a heavy 20-credit course load in the spring of 2013 to make him eligible under NCAA rules. He also worked out heavily in the summer, and practiced passing routes on his high school playing field.

Mayle was considered a three-star recruit (out of four possible stars) by college scouts. Mayle was recruited by a number of notable four-year collegiate football programs, including Arizona State University, Louisiana State University, Ohio State University, Texas A&M University, the University of Kentucky, the University of Houston, the University of Miami, the University of Nevada, Las Vegas, and the University of West Virginia. Many other schools declined to recruit him, worried that he had only a single year of NCAA eligibility left. He chose Washington State University (WSU) after head coach Mike Leach and outside receivers assistant coach Dennis Simmons became the only coaches to visit him personally.

=== Washington State ===
At WSU, Mayle played football on a scholarship. He continued to lift weights seriously and improve his strength and stamina, and hone his receiving skills. He also lost a considerable amount of weight, dropping to 225 pounds (102 kg) from 240 pounds (110 kg). One of his former high school football coaches, Terry Stark, called his physical transformation "incredible". He also continued his heavy off-season training and practice schedule. But during the 2013 season, Mayle began to lose his focus on football. He believed his superior athleticism was enough to allow him to win games, and he dismissed the technical and skill-building side of football. He didn't take practice seriously, was indifferent to the study of game film, and rarely talked to coaches or teammates. WSU receivers coach David Yost told him to "Stop making excuses and get your job done. You'd be a much better player if you stopped making excuses and get what you have to do done, instead of making excuses why you didn't get it done." Mayle later recalled that this comment cut deeply, but also motivated him to get back on track athletically.

The 2013 season started slowly for Mayle due to his difficulty adjusting to the far more competitive football world at WSU. He averaged just 1.4 catches and 14 yards per game in the first five matches. But in his final eight games, he caught 4.4 passes and had 54.9 yards per game. Mayle was fourth on the WSU squad in receptions (42) and yards (549), and caught five touchdowns in six games. He tied with Gabe Marks and Dominique Williams for a team-high seven touchdowns. He was a contender for the Fred Biletnikoff Award, an honor given to the most outstanding receiver in American college football. At the end of the 2013 season, WSU applied for and was granted a waiver by the NCAA, giving Mayle another year of college football eligibility. In the 2014 season, Mayle led the Pac-12 Conference in both receptions (106, 9 for touchdowns) and yards (1,483), was tied for second in the country for receptions, and was second-best receiver in the nation in receiving yards per game (123.6). Both the number of receptions and the number of yards were a WSU single-season best ever in the team's history, and he was one of only two players in the nation to have two 250-yard receiving games. He also led the nation in dropped passes (19). At the end of the season, he was appointed to the All-Pac-12 Second Team and Sports Illustrated magazine named him an All-America honorable mention.

== Professional career ==
=== Pre-draft ===
Pre-draft measurables
Height	Weight	Arm length	Hand span	40-yard dash	20-yard shuttle	Three-cone drill	Vertical jump	Broad jump
6 ft 2 in (1.88 m)	224 lb (102 kg)	31 3/4 in (0.81 m)	9 in (0.23 m)	4.67 s	4.13 s	6.93 s	35.5 in (0.90 m)	9 ft 9 in (2.97 m)
All values from NFL Combine

CBS Sports analyst Rob Rang said in November 2014 that he expected Mayle to be picked in the fourth or fifth round of the 2015 NFL draft. Rang called him "a pretty spectacular athlete", but felt he ran routes a little sloppily and occasionally lost his focus on the ball. But he had excellent speed and acceleration, and good evasion skills. In his last collegiate season, he led the Football Bowl Subdivision (FBS) with 19 dropped passes, leading to many scouts citing that his inability to hold onto passes was a major concern.

=== Cleveland Browns ===
Mayle was selected by the Cleveland Browns in the fourth round (123rd overall) of the 2015 NFL draft. He was the highest WSU wide receiver picked in the draft pick since Jason Hill was selected in the third round in 2007.

The team announced on May 18 that Mayle would have surgery on his right thumb. Physicians determined Mayle broke his thumb while playing in the Senior Bowl in January, but that the injury was not properly diagnosed until NFL rookie mini-camp. (Note: After the draft was over, Scout.com speculated that Mayle might have been taken earlier, but the injury to his thumb caused teams to pass him over.) On May 17, 2015, Mayle signed a four-year, $2.76 million rookie contract that also included a $473,152 signing bonus.

Although he was a fourth round pick and still in his first season, Mayle was one of the Browns' final cuts during training camp on September 5, 2015. It was cited that he was cut due to dropping numerous passes throughout training camp.

=== Dallas Cowboys ===
On September 8, 2015, he was signed by the Dallas Cowboys to their practice squad. On October 10, he was promoted to the active roster. Three days later he was waived and re-signed to the practice squad. On December 30, Mayle signed a 3-year, $1.575 million contract to return to the Cowboys.

On September 3, 2016, he was released by the Cowboys and was signed to the practice squad the next day. He was promoted to the active roster on November 16, after tight end Geoff Swaim was lost for the season with an injury. He was used on special teams and to contribute as a blocker in the running game from his wide receiver position, but struggled with penalties. He was waived on December 29, to make room for offensive lineman Ryan Seymour, who was needed for depth purposes in the last game of the season, in order to rest some of the starters for the postseason play.

=== Baltimore Ravens ===
On December 30, 2016, Mayle was claimed off waivers by the Baltimore Ravens, to secure his rights for the 2017 season. He was declared inactive for the week 17th game.

In 2017, he was moved to tight end during organized team activities. He was the fourth-string tight end and made the team mainly because of his special teams contributions.

On September 1, 2018, Mayle was waived by the Ravens.

=== Los Angeles Chargers ===
On September 25, 2018, Mayle was signed to the Los Angeles Chargers' practice squad.

Mayle signed a reserve/future contract with the Chargers on January 14, 2019. He was waived/injured during final roster cuts on August 31, 2019, and reverted to the team's injured reserve list the next day. He was waived from injured reserve with an injury settlement on September 10.

=== Toronto Argonauts ===
Mayle signed with the Toronto Argonauts of the Canadian Football League on January 27, 2020. He signed a contract extension with the team on December 29, 2020. On February 22, 2021, Mayle was released by the Argonauts.
