= Connor Halliday =

American football player (born 1992)

No. 4
- Position: Quarterback

Personal information
- Born: March 23, 1992 (age 34); Lewiston, Idaho, U.S.
- Listed height: 6 ft 4 in (1.93 m)
- Listed weight: 198 lb (90 kg)

Career information
- High school: Joel E. Ferris (Spokane, Washington)
- College: Washington State
- NFL draft: 2015: undrafted

Career history
- Washington Redskins (2015)*; BC Lions (2015)*; Montreal Alouettes (2016)*
- * Offseason or practice squad member only

Awards and highlights
- New Mexico Bowl MVP (2013); NCAA FBS records: Most passes attempted in a single game: 89; Most passes completed in a single game: 58 (Note: Tied with Andy Schmitt.)
- Stats at Pro Football Reference

Connor Halliday (born March 23, 1992) is an American former professional football quarterback. He was signed by the Washington Redskins as an undrafted free agent in 2015. After his release from the Redskins he was signed by the BC Lions in the same year and the Montreal Alouettes in 2016. He played college football at Washington State. Halliday is tied for first on the NCAA Division I FBS single-game passing yardage record with 734 yards, which he set in a losing effort versus California in 2014.

== Early life ==
Halliday attended Joel E. Ferris High School in Spokane, Washington. As a senior, he threw for 4,198 yards and 43 touchdowns and was the Greater Spokane League (GSL) Offensive Most Valuable Player.

== College career ==
Halliday committed to Washington State University and played for the Cougars from 2011 through 2014, redshirting in 2010.

=== 2011 ===
As a redshirt freshman in 2011, Halliday appeared in four games and made one start. In the game against Arizona State he passed for a Pac-12 and Washington State freshman record, 494 yards with four touchdowns.

=== 2012 ===
As a redshirt sophomore in 2012, he appeared in nine games with five starts. He finished the year completing 152 of 291 passes for 1,878 yards, 15 touchdowns and 13 interceptions.

=== 2013 ===
As a junior in 2013, he started all 13 games. He set or tied numerous Washington State, Pac-12 and NCAA records during the season. In the game against Oregon, he broke Drew Brees' record for pass attempts in a game with 89. His 449 completions and 714 attempts were both Pac-12 and Washington State records. His 4,597 yards were also a school record and his 34 touchdowns tied Ryan Leaf for most in school history. In the 2013 New Mexico Bowl, he threw for 410 yards and six touchdowns in a loss against Colorado State.

=== 2014 ===
On October 4, during his senior season, he set the NCAA FBS passing yardage record by passing for 734 yards in a 60-59 loss to California. Texas Tech quarterback Patrick Mahomes would match this record in 2016. The previous record of 716 yards was set by Houston quarterback David Klingler in the 1990 Coca-Cola Classic. On November 1, Halliday suffered a broken tibia and fibula when his leg got caught underneath USC defensive lineman Leonard Williams, ending his college career.

=== Statistics ===
Year	Team	GP	Passing								
Year	Team	GP	Cmp	Att	Pct	Yds	Avg	Lng	TD	Int	Rtg
2010	Washington State	0	Redshirted								
2011	Washington State	4	59	103	57.3	960	9.3	85	9	4	156.6
2012	Washington State	9	152	291	52.2	1,878	6.5	81	15	13	114.5
2013	Washington State	13	449	714	62.9	4,597	6.4	72	34	22	126.5
2014	Washington State	9	354	526	67.3	3,873	7.4	90	32	11	145.0
Career		35	1,014	1,634	62.1	11,308	6.9	90	90	50	132.4

== Professional career ==
Halliday signed with the Washington Redskins on May 2, 2015, after going undrafted in the 2015 NFL draft. He was released on May 15, 2015, after not showing up to the team's minicamp. It was later confirmed that Halliday had decided to retire. On October 6, 2015, he was signed to the BC Lions' practice squad. He was released by the Lions on October 8, 2015. He was signed to the Montreal Alouettes' practice squad on September 30, 2016. He was released by the Alouettes on October 17, 2016. Halliday signed with the Alouettes on April 17, 2017, and was released on April 19, 2017. Connor decided to retire from pro football after he tore his right rotator cuff in camp with the Alouettes.

== See also ==
- List of NCAA major college football yearly total offense leaders
