= Jason Hill (American football) =

American football player (born 1985)

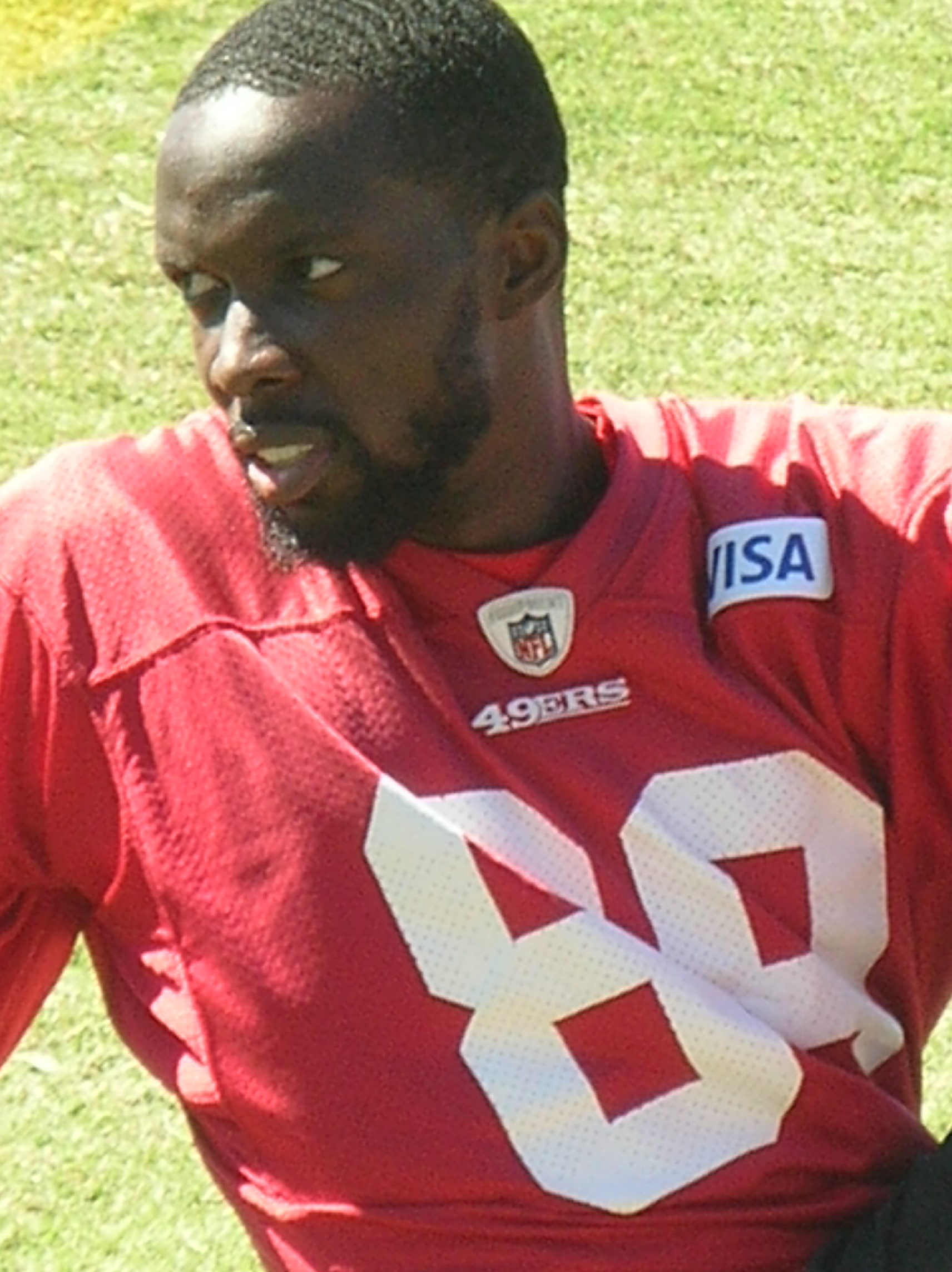
- Hill with the San Francisco 49ers in 2010

No. 83, 89
- Position: Wide receiver

Personal information
- Born: February 20, 1985 (age 41); San Francisco, California, U.S.
- Listed height: 6 ft 1 in (1.85 m)
- Listed weight: 204 lb (93 kg)

Career information
- College: Washington State
- NFL draft: 2007: 3rd round, 76th overall pick

Career history
- San Francisco 49ers (2007–2010); Jacksonville Jaguars (2010–2011); Denver Broncos (2012)*; New York Jets (2012)
- * Offseason or practice squad member only

Awards and highlights
- 3× Second-team All-Pac-10 (2004, 2005, 2006)

Career NFL statistics
- Receptions: 78
- Receiving yards: 1,043
- Receiving average: 13.4
- Receiving touchdowns: 9
- Stats at Pro Football Reference

Jason Hill (born February 20, 1985) is an American former professional football player who was a wide receiver in the National Football League (NFL). He was selected by the San Francisco 49ers in the third round of the 2007 NFL draft. He played college football at Washington State University.

He was also a member of the Jacksonville Jaguars, Denver Broncos, and New York Jets.

== Early life ==
Hill graduated from Sacred Heart Cathedral in San Francisco in 2003. He played both football and basketball, and was the runner-up for the 2003 San Francisco Player of the Year Award by the San Francisco Examiner. San Francisco 49ers (2013) cornerback Eric Andrew Wright, who attended rival Archbishop Riordan High School, won the award.

== College career ==
Hill played collegiately at Washington State University. In his last three seasons (2004–2006), he recorded 32 touchdown catches, breaking the school career-record of 22 set by Hugh Campbell (1960–62), and tying for second on the Pac-10's all-time list. His 2,704 career receiving yards broke Campbell's former school career-record of 2,452, and his 148 career receptions rank second in school history behind Campbell's 176. He majored in sociology.

== Professional career ==
Pre-draft measurables
Height	Weight	Arm length	Hand span	40-yard dash	10-yard split	20-yard split	20-yard shuttle	Three-cone drill	Vertical jump	Broad jump
6 ft 0 1/2 in (1.84 m)	204 lb (93 kg)	32 3/4 in (0.83 m)	9 5/8 in (0.24 m)	4.38 s	1.53 s	2.51 s	4.22 s	7.02 s	37.0 in (0.94 m)	10 ft 3 in (3.12 m)
All values from NFL Combine

=== San Francisco 49ers ===
Hill was selected in the third round of the 2007 NFL draft by the San Francisco 49ers, his hometown team. At the 2007 NFL Combine, Hill ran a 4.32 in the 40-yard dash, making him the second-fastest receiver in the draft behind Yamon Figurs (4.30). Hill played sparingly in his rookie year with the 49ers, appearing in only five games due to lingering hamstring and groin injuries. He finished the season with one reception for six yards and four special teams tackles.

In 2008, Hill came on strong in the second half of the season when Shaun Hill replaced J. T. O'Sullivan as the 49ers starting quarterback. He finished the season with 30 catches for 317 yards and two touchdowns. Hill again played sparingly in 2009, being inactive for most of the first half of the season. His best game was in Week 10 against the Tennessee Titans, when he caught 4 passes for 50 yards and two touchdowns. He finished the season with 9 catches for 90 yards and two touchdowns. After the 2010 preseason Hill was one of the players to be cut during final cuts. On September 14, Hill was re-signed by the 49ers due to injured Ted Ginn Jr. Hill was released by the team on November 16.

=== Jacksonville Jaguars ===
On November 17, 2010, he was claimed off waivers by the Jacksonville Jaguars. The Jaguars waived Hill on November 30, 2011, despite him being their second leading receiver.

=== Denver Broncos ===
Hill signed with the Denver Broncos on February 15, 2012. He was released by the team on August 31, 2012.

=== New York Jets ===
Hill was signed by the New York Jets on October 3, 2012, after Santonio Holmes was placed on injured reserve due to a Lisfranc injury. He was released on October 27, 2012, to make room for Hayden Smith's call-up from the practice squad. On November 6, 2012, he was re-signed by the Jets. Hill was waived on November 20, 2012, with a non-football injury designation, a claim which Hill disputes.
