= 1999 Wisconsin Badgers football team =

American college football season

1999 Wisconsin Badgers football

Big Ten champion Rose Bowl champion

Rose Bowl, W 17–9 vs. Stanford
- Conference: Big Ten Conference

Ranking
- Coaches: No. 4
- AP: No. 4
- Record: 10–2 (7–1 Big Ten)
- Head coach: Barry Alvarez (10th season)
- Offensive coordinator: Brian White (1st season)
- Offensive scheme: Smashmouth
- Defensive coordinator: Kevin Cosgrove (5th season)
- Base defense: 4–3
- MVPs: Ron Dayne; Chris McIntosh
- Captains: Ron Dayne; Jason Doering; Chris Ghidorzi; Chris McIntosh; Donnel Thompson
- Home stadium: Camp Randall Stadium

1999 Big Ten Conference football standings
	Conf.			Overall
Team	W		L	W		L
No. 4 Wisconsin $	7	–	1	10	–	2
No. 7 Michigan State	6	–	2	10	–	2
No. 5 Michigan %	6	–	2	10	–	2
No. 11 Penn State	5	–	3	10	–	3
No. 18 Minnesota	5	–	3	8	–	4
No. 24 Illinois	4	–	4	8	–	4
No. 25 Purdue	4	–	4	7	–	5
Ohio State	3	–	5	6	–	6
Indiana	3	–	5	4	–	7
Northwestern	1	–	7	3	–	8
Iowa	0	–	8	1	–	10
$ – BCS representative as conference champion; % – BCS at-large representative; Rankings from AP Poll

The 1999 Wisconsin Badgers football team was an American football team that represented the University of Wisconsin–Madison as a member of the Big Ten Conference during the 1999 NCAA Division I-A football season. In their tenth year under head coach Barry Alvarez, the Badgers compiled a 9–2 record (7–1 in conference games), won the Big Ten championship (the program's first outright championship since 1962), and outscored opponents by a total of 409 to 153. After starting the season ranked No. 9, the Badgers lost back-to-back games against Cincinnati and No. 4 Michigan and dropped from the rankings. In their fifth game, they came back from a 17–0 deficit to beat No. 12 Ohio State and went on to win eight straight games, including a record-setting 59–0 victory over Indiana. The season concluded with a 17–9 victory over No. 22 Stanford in the 2000 Rose Bowl. The Badgers were ranked No. 4 in the final AP and Coaches polls.

Senior running back Ron Dayne gained 2,034 rushing yards and scored 120 points. He won, among other awards, the Heisman Trophy, the Maxwell Award, and the Chicago Tribune Silver Football. Having rushed for over 1,000 yards in each of his four years at Wisconsin, Dayne broke the NCAA Division I-A (now FBS) career rushing record, ending his career with 6,397 rushing yards (7,125 including bowl games).

Other key players included offensive tackle Chris McIntosh who was selected as a consensus All-American, cornerback Jamar Fletcher who led the Big Ten in interceptions and won first-team All-America honors, quarterback Brooks Bollinger who was named Big Ten freshman of the year, and wide receiver Nick Davis who tallied over 1,000 total yards on receptions and kickoff and punt returns.

The team played its home games at Camp Randall Stadium in Madison, Wisconsin.

== Schedule ==
Date	Time	Opponent	Rank	Site	TV	Result	Attendance	Source
September 4	11:00 a.m.	Murray State*	No. 9	Camp Randall Stadium; Madison, WI	MSC	W 49–10	77,527	
September 11	11:00 a.m.	Ball State*	No. 9	Camp Randall Stadium; Madison, WI	ESPN Plus	W 50–10	75,807	
September 18	2:15 p.m.	at Cincinnati*	No. 9	Nippert Stadium; Cincinnati, OH	FSN	L 12–17	27,721	
September 25	2:30 p.m.	No. 4 Michigan	No. 20	Camp Randall Stadium; Madison, WI (College GameDay)	ABC	L 16–21	79,037	
October 2	2:30 p.m.	at No. 12 Ohio State		Ohio Stadium; Columbus, OH	ABC	W 42–17	93,524	
October 9	11:00 a.m.	at No. 25 Minnesota	No. 20	Hubert H. Humphrey Metrodome; Minneapolis, MN (rivalry)	ESPN2	W 20–17 ^{OT}	63,108	
October 16	11:00 a.m.	Indiana^{†}	No. 17	Camp Randall Stadium; Madison, WI	ESPN	W 59–0	78,243	
October 23	11:00 a.m.	No. 11 Michigan State	No. 17	Camp Randall Stadium; Madison, WI	ESPN2	W 40–10	78,469	
October 30	11:00 a.m.	at Northwestern	No. 11	Ryan Field; Evanston, IL	ESPN+	W 35–19	42,292	
November 6	2:30 p.m.	at No. 17 Purdue	No. 10	Ross–Ade Stadium; West Lafayette, IN	ABC	W 28–21	67,308	
November 13	2:30 p.m.	Iowa	No. 9	Camp Randall Stadium; Madison, WI (rivalry)	ABC	W 41–3	79,404	
January 1, 2000	3:30 p.m.	vs. No. 22 Stanford*	No. 4	Rose Bowl; Pasadena, CA (Rose Bowl)	ABC	W 17–9	93,731	
*Non-conference game; ^{†}Homecoming; Rankings from AP Poll released prior to the game; All times are in Central time

== Rankings ==
Ranking movements Legend: ██ Increase in ranking ██ Decrease in ranking — = Not ranked RV = Received votes
	Week																
Poll	Pre	1	2	3	4	5	6	7	8	9	10	11	12	13	14	15	Final
AP	10	9	9	9	20	RV	20	17	17	11	10	9	5	4	4	4	4
Coaches Poll	10	10*	8	8	17	—	20	18	16	11	10	9	5	4	4	4	4
BCS	Not released									9	10	8	7	7	8	7	Not released

== Game summaries ==
=== At Ohio State ===
Team	1	2	3	4	Total
• Wisconsin	0	6	12	24	42
Ohio State	7	10	0	0	17

- Date: October 2
- Location: Ohio Stadium, Columbus, OH
- Game attendance: 93,524
- TV announcers (ABC): Brad Nessler, Dean Blevins & Lynn Swann
- Source: USA Today

Scoring summary
1	Ohio St	Wiley 1-yard run (Stultz kick)	Ohio St 7-0
2	Ohio St	Stultz 35-yard field goal	Ohio St 10-0
2	Ohio St	Germany 40-yard pass from Bellisari (Stultz kick)	Ohio St 17-0
2	Wisconsin	Pisetsky 42-yard field goal	Ohio St 17-3
2	Wisconsin	Pisetsky 25-yard field goal	Ohio St 17-6
3	Wisconsin	Dayne 3-yard run (two-point conversion failed)	Ohio St 17-12
3	Wisconsin	Dayne 11-yard run (two-point conversion failed)	Wisconsin 18-17
4	Wisconsin	Pisetsky 27-yard field goal	Wisconsin 21-17
4	Wisconsin	Dayne 1-yard run (Pisetsky kick)	Wisconsin 28-17
4	Wisconsin	Faulkner 1-yard run (Pisetsky kick)	Wisconsin 35-17
4	Wisconsin	Dayne 2-yard run (Pisetsky kick)	Wisconsin 42-17

== Personnel ==
=== Roster ===
1999 Wisconsin Badgers football team roster
Players
Coaches
Offense

Pos.	#	Name	Class
TE	81	Mark Anelli	So
RB	29	Michael Bennett	So
RB	24	Erik Bickerstaff	Fr
QB	5	Brooks Bollinger	Fr
WR	19	David Braun	Fr
WR	17	Demetrius Brown	Fr
FB	25	Marcus Carpenter	Sr
WR	88	Chris Chambers	Jr
G	54	Dave Costa	Jr
RB	39	Carlos Daniels	So
WR	22	Nick Davis	So
RB	33	Ron Dayne (C)	Sr
WR	3	Lee Evans	Fr
RB	4	Eddie Faulkner	Jr
G	60	Bill Ferrario	Jr
G	76	Josh Jakubowski	Jr
C	72	Al Johnson	Fr
OT	64	Ben Johnson	Fr
G	56	Jason Jowers	Fr
QB	12	Scott Kavanagh	Sr
OT	57	Philip Koch	Jr
FB	41	Chad Kuhns	So
OT	71	Brian Lamont	So
OT	75	Chris McIntosh (C)	Sr
WR	1	Ahmad Merritt	Sr
C	70	Casey Rabach	Jr
TE	87	Dague Retzlaff	Jr
C, G	53	Rob Roell	Sr
TE	85	John Sigmund	Jr
QB	19	Jim Sorgi	Fr
OT	68	Mark Tauscher	Sr
RB	38	Matt Unertl	Jr
WR	9	Conroy Whyte	So

Defense

Pos.	#	Name	Class
CB	6	Joey Boese	So
DE	77	Wendell Bryant	So
LB	47	P. J. Cannon	Fr
S	31	Carlease Clark	So
S	8	Jason Doering (C)	Jr
LB	52	Mark Downing	So
CB	36	Mike Echols	So
DE	96	John Favret	Jr
CB	2	Jamar Fletcher	So
LB	16	Chris Ghidorzi (C)	Sr
LB	49	Nick Greisen	So
LB	42	Ben Herbert	So
DB	11	Devery Hughes	Fr
LB	19	Roger Knight	Jr
DE	78	Ross Kolodziej	Jr
LB	45	Dan Lisowski	So
NT	98	Eric Mahlik	Jr
DB	30	Ryan Marks	Jr
DE	48	Delante McGrew	So
DE	9	Sam Mueller	Jr
S	26	Bobby Myers	Sr
S	15	Tim Rosga	Sr
DB	22	Jason Schick	So
DE	93	Chuck Smith	So
DE	99	Jake Sprague	So
LB	32	Bryson Thompson	So
LB	44	Donnel Thompson (C)	Sr
CB	23	B. J. Tucker	Fr

Special teams

Pos.	#	Name	Class
K	20	Vitaly Pisetsky	Sr
LS	86	Mike Solwold	Jr
P	14	Kevin Stemke	Jr

Head coach

- Barry Alvarez

Coordinators/assistant coaches

- Brian White – Offensive coordinator/running backs
- Kevin Cosgrove – Defensive coordinator/linebackers
- Joe Baker – Outside linebackers/special teams
- Tim Davis – Tight ends
- Phil Elmassian – Defensive backs
- Jeff Horton – Quarterbacks
- Jim Hueber – Run game coordinator/offensive line
- Henry Mason – Wide receivers
- John Palermo – Assistant head coach/defensive line
- Bernie Wyatt – Director of football operations

Legend

- (C) Team captain
- (S) Suspended
- (I) Ineligible
- Injured
- Redshirt

=== Regular starters ===
Position	Player
Quarterback	Brooks Bollinger
Running back	Ron Dayne
Fullback	Chad Kuhns
Wide receiver	Chris Chambers
Wide receiver	Nick Davis
Tight end	Dague Retzlaff
Left tackle	Chris McIntosh
Left guard	Bill Ferrario
Center	Casey Rabach
Right guard	Dave Costa
Right tackle	Mark Tauscher

Position	Player
Defensive end	Ross Kolodziej
Nose tackle	Eric Mahlik
Defensive end	Wendell Bryant
Rush end	John Favret
Outside linebacker	Roger Knight
Inside linebacker	Donnel Thompson
Outside linebacker	Chris Ghidorzi
Cornerback	Mike Echols
Free safety	Jason Doering
Strong safety	Bobby Myers
Cornerback	Jamar Fletcher

== Statistical accomplishments ==
Team statistics
For the 1999 season, inclusive of the Rose Bowl, the Badgers outscored opponents by a total of 409 to 153, averaging 34.08 points per game and allowing 12.83 points per game by opponents. They gained an average of 417.2 yards of total offense per game, consisting of 275.4 rushing yards and 141.75 passing yards. On defense, they allowed opponents to gain an average of 298.1 yards per game, consisting of 109.9 rushing yards and 188.17 passing yards per game.

Ron Dayne
Senior running back Ron Dayne gained 2,087 rushing yards on 337 carries for an average of 6.0 yards per carry. Dayne also led the team with 120 points scored on 20 touchdowns. Dayne rushed for over 1,000 yards in each of his four years at Wisconsin; he was only the fifth player to accomplish that feat, following Tony Dorsett (1973-1976), Amos Lawrence (1977-1980), Denvis Manns (1995-1998), and Ricky Williams (1995-1998). On November 12, 1999, Dayne broke the NCAA Division I-A (now FBS) career rushing record of 6,279 yards set the prior season by Ricky Williams. Dayne concluded his college career with 6,397 rushing yards (7,125 including bowl games). (Dayne's career rushing record was surpassed in 2016 by Donnel Pumphrey.)

Other individual statistical leaders
Quarterback Brooks Bollinger completed 82 of 140 passes (58.57%) for 1,138 yards, eight touchdowns, two interceptions, and a 142.55 passer rating. He also tallied 454 rushing yards. Scott Kavanagh was the starting quarterback at the beginning of the season, completing 40 of 79 passes for 568 yards with a 116.85 passer rating.

Wide receiver Chris Chambers led the team with 41 receptions for 578 yards and four touchdowns.

Kicker Vitaly Pisetsky converted 46 of 48 extra-point kicks and 16 of 20 field goal attempts for a total of 94 points scored.

The team's leaders on defense included defensive back Jamar Fletcher (seven interceptions, including two returned for touchdowns), linebacker Chris Ghidorzi (115 total tackles), defensive back Jason Doering (79 solo tackles), and defensive tackle Wendell Bryant (seven sacks).

Wide receiver Nick Davis returned 16 kickoffs for 409 yards and two touchdowns, an average of 25.56 yards per return. He also returned 20 punts for 252 yards, an average of 12.6 yards per return. He was also the team's No. 2 receiver with 19 catches for 346 yards.

== Awards and honors ==
Ron Dayne
Senior running back Ron Dayne swept college football's major awards, including:

- Dayne won the Heisman Trophy, dominating the voting with 586 first-place selections. Second-place finisher Joe Hamilton received 96 first-place votes, and third-place finisher Michael Vick received 25 first-place votes. He was the second Wisconsin player to win the award, joining Alan Ameche who won the award in 1954.
- Dayne was a consensus pick on the 1950 All-America college football team, receiving first-team honors from the Associated Press (AP), Burger King/American Football Coaches Association (AFCA), Football Writers Association of America (FWAA), The Sporting News (TSN), the Walter Camp Football Foundation (WCFF), Pro Football Weekly (PFW), and Football News (FN).
- Dayne also won the Maxwell Award (best all-around player), the Chicago Tribune Silver Football (Big Ten most valuable player), the Doak Walker Award (top running back), the Walter Camp Award (college football player of the year), the Chic Harley Award, the Jim Brown Award, AP College Football Player of the Year, and The Sporting News College Football Player of the Year.
- Dayne was also selected as the most valuable player in the 2000 Rose Bowl. It was Dayne's second consecutive win as Rose Bowl MVP, having also won the award for the 1999 Rose Bowl.

Dayne's achievements were selected by Wisconsin newspaper editors as the top sports story in Wisconsin for 1999. Dayne supplanted the Green Bay Packers who had won the recognition the prior three years.

Others
Offensive tackle Chris McIntosh, from Pewaukee, Wisconsin, was also a consensus pick on the 1999 All-America team, receiving first-team honors from the AFCA, AP, FWAA, TSN, WCFF, PFW, FN, and CNNSI. McIntosh was also one of three finalists for the Outland Trophy and set a Wisconsin record with 49 consecutive games started.

Cornerback Jamar Fletcher, from St. Louis, received first-team All-America honors from TSN, PFW, FN, and CNNSI.

Seven Wisconsin players received first-team honors on the 1999 All-Big Ten Conference football team:

- Dayne (Coaches-1, Media-1);
- McIntosh (Coaches-1, Media-1);
- Fletcher (Coaches-1, Media-1);
- Center Casey Rabach (Coaches-2, Media-1);
- Offensive guard Bill Ferrario (Coaches-1, Media-1);
- Defensive lineman Wendell Bryant (Coaches-1, Media-2); and
- Kicker Vitaly Pisetsky (Coaches-1, Media-1).

Quarterback Brooks Bollinger was selected by the Big Ten coaches and media as the Big Ten freshman of the year.

== NFL drafts ==
Four Wisconsin players were selected in the 2000 NFL draft:

Player	Position	Round	Pick	NFL club
Ron Dayne	Running back	1	11	New York Giants
Chris McIntosh	Offensive tackle	1	22	Seattle Seahawks
Bobby Myers	Defensive back	4	124	Tennessee Titans
Mark Tauscher	Guard	7	224	Green Bay Packers

Eight others were selected in the 2001 NFL draft:

Player	Position	Round	Pick	NFL club
Jamar Fletcher	Cornerback	1	26	Miami Dolphins
Michael Bennett	Running back	1	27	Minnesota Vikings
Chris Chambers	Wide receiver	2	52	Miami Dolphins
Casey Rabach	Center	3	92	Baltimore Ravens
Bill Ferrario	Guard	4	105	Green Bay Packers
Roger Knight	Linebacker	6	182	Pittsburgh Steelers
Jason Doering	Defensive back	6	193	Indianapolis Colts
Ross Kolodziej	Defensive end	7	230	New York Giants

Also, defensive tackle Wendell Bryant was selected in the first round of the 2002 NFL draft, the fifth player from the 1999 Wisconsin team to be drafted in the first round.
