= 1999 Michigan State Spartans football team =

American college football season

1999 Michigan State Spartans football

Florida Citrus Bowl champion

Florida Citrus Bowl, W 37–34 vs. Florida
- Conference: Big Ten Conference

Ranking
- Coaches: No. 7
- AP: No. 7
- Record: 10–2 (6–2 Big Ten)
- Head coach: Nick Saban (5th season; regular season); Bobby Williams (bowl game)
- Offensive coordinator: Morris Watts (9th season)
- Defensive coordinator: Bill Miller (1st season)
- MVP: Aric Morris
- Home stadium: Spartan Stadium

1999 Big Ten Conference football standings
	Conf.			Overall
Team	W		L	W		L
No. 4 Wisconsin $	7	–	1	10	–	2
No. 7 Michigan State	6	–	2	10	–	2
No. 5 Michigan %	6	–	2	10	–	2
No. 11 Penn State	5	–	3	10	–	3
No. 18 Minnesota	5	–	3	8	–	4
No. 24 Illinois	4	–	4	8	–	4
No. 25 Purdue	4	–	4	7	–	5
Ohio State	3	–	5	6	–	6
Indiana	3	–	5	4	–	7
Northwestern	1	–	7	3	–	8
Iowa	0	–	8	1	–	10
$ – BCS representative as conference champion; % – BCS at-large representative; Rankings from AP Poll

The 1999 Michigan State Spartans football team was an American football team that represented Michigan State University as a member of the Big Ten Conference during the 1999 NCAA Division I-A football season. In their fifth and final year under head coach Nick Saban, the Spartans compiled a 10–2 record (6–2 in conference games), outscored opponents by a total of 341 to 211, tied for second place in the Big Ten, and were ranked No. 7 in the final AP and UPI polls. The Spartans' two losses came at the hands of Heisman Trophy finalists. In their loss to Purdue, Drew Brees passed for 509 yards, and in their loss one week later to Wisconsin, Heisman winner Ron Dayne rushed for 214 yards.

Saban announced on November 30 that he was leaving to take the head coaching job at LSU. Bobby Williams took over as interim head coach and led the Spartans to a 37–34 victory over Florida in the Citrus Bowl, winning on a last- second field goal by kicker Paul Edinger.

The Spartans averaged 134.6 rushing yards and 200.3 passing yards per game. On defense, they held opponents to 70.6 rushing yards and 203.5 passing yards per game. The team's individual leaders included:

- Quarterback Bill Burke completed 152 of 277 passes (54.9%) for 1,957 yards, 17 touchdowns, 16 interceptions, and a 122.9 quarterback rating.
- Wide receiver Plaxico Burress tallied 53 receptions for 957 yards and nine touchdowns.
- Running back Lloyd Clemons tallied 854 rushing yards on 171 carries, an average of 5.0 yards per carry.
- Placekicker Paul Edinger led the team in scoring with 104 points, converting 39 of 40 extra points and 18 of 22 field goals.

Safety Aric Morris was selected as the team's most valuable player. Linebacker Julian Peterson received first-team All-America honors from Football News. Eight Michigan State players received honors on the 1999 All-Big Ten Conference football team: Burress (Coaches-1, Media-1); Peterson (Coaches-2, Media-1); Edinger (Coaches-2, Media-2); Morris (Coaches-2, Media-2); defensive lineman Robaire Smith (Coaches-1, Media-1); defensive back Amp Campbell (Coaches-1, Media-1); punter Craig Jewett (Coaches-1, Media-2); tight end Chris Baker; and offensive guard Shaun Mason (Coaches-2, Media-2).

The Spartans played their home games at Spartan Stadium in East Lansing, Michigan.

== Schedule ==
Date	Time	Opponent	Rank	Site	TV	Result	Attendance	Source
September 2	8:00 p.m.	Oregon*		Spartan Stadium; East Lansing, MI	ESPN	W 27–20	72,923	
September 11	1:00 p.m.	Eastern Michigan*		Spartan Stadium; East Lansing, MI		W 51–7	72,569	
September 18	1:30 p.m.	at No. 24 Notre Dame*		Notre Dame Stadium; Notre Dame, IN (rivalry)	NBC	W 23–13	80,012	
September 25	3:30 p.m.	at Illinois	No. 19	Memorial Stadium; Champaign, IL		W 27–10	52,417	
October 2	12:10 p.m.	Iowa^{†}	No. 14	Spartan Stadium; East Lansing, MI	ESPN Plus	W 49–3	73,629	
October 9	12:00 p.m.	No. 3 Michigan	No. 11	Spartan Stadium; East Lansing, MI (rivalry, College GameDay)	ABC	W 34–31	76,895	
October 16	3:30 p.m.	at No. 20 Purdue	No. 5	Ross–Ade Stadium; West Lafayette, IN	ABC	L 28–52	68,216	
October 23	12:10 p.m.	at No. 16 Wisconsin	No. 11	Camp Randall Stadium; Madison, WI	ESPN2	L 10–40	78,469	
November 6	12:10 p.m.	No. 20 Ohio State	No. 19	Spartan Stadium; East Lansing, MI	ESPN	W 23–7	74,639	
November 13	1:00 p.m.	at Northwestern	No. 17	Ryan Field; Evanston, IL		W 34–0	30,045	
November 20	3:30 p.m.	No. 13 Penn State	No. 15	Spartan Stadium; East Lansing, MI (rivalry)	ABC	W 35–28	74,231	
January 1, 2000	1:00 p.m.	vs. No. 10 Florida*	No. 9	Florida Citrus Bowl; Orlando, FL (Florida Citrus Bowl)	ABC	W 37–34	54,866	
*Non-conference game; ^{†}Homecoming; Rankings from AP Poll released prior to the game; All times are in Eastern time

== Rankings ==
Ranking movements Legend: ██ Increase in ranking ██ Decrease in ranking — = Not ranked RV = Received votes
	Week																
Poll	Pre	1	2	3	4	5	6	7	8	9	10	11	12	13	14	15	Final
AP	RV	RV	RV	RV	19	14	11	5	11	19	19	17	15	11	10	9	7
Coaches Poll	RV	RV*	RV	RV	21	14	11	7	13	20	19	17	14	11	10	9	7
BCS	Not released									15	—	13	12	11	10	9	Not released

== Game summaries ==
=== Oregon ===
Oregon at Michigan State

Team	1	2	3	4	Total
Oregon	7	10	0	3	20
• Michigan State	7	0	10	10	27

- Date: September 2
- Location: Spartan Stadium, East Lansing, MI
- Game start: 8:00 p.m.
- Game attendance: 72,923
- TV announcers (ESPN): Mike Tirico, Lee Corso, Kirk Herbstreit

=== Michigan ===
No. 3 Michigan at No. 11 Michigan State

Team	1	2	3	4	Total
Michigan	0	10	0	21	31
• Michigan State	7	6	14	7	34

- Date: October 9
- Location: Spartan Stadium, East Lansing, MI
- Game start: 12:00 p.m.
- Game attendance: 76,895
- TV announcers (ABC): Tim Brant & Mike Golic

Scoring summary
1	6:55	MSU	T.J. Duckett 1 yard run (Paul Edinger kick)	MSU 7–0
2	14:55	MICH	Hayden Epstein 56 yard field goal	MSU 7–3
2	5:28	MSU	Paul Edinger 39 yard field goal	MSU 10–3
2	3:39	MICH	Marcus Knight 81 yard pass from Drew Henson (Jeff Del Verne kick)	Tied 10–10
2	1:17	MSU	Paul Edinger 43 yard field goal	MSU 13–10
3	6:15	MSU	Gari Scott 19 yard pass from Bill Burke (Paul Edinger kick)	MSU 20–10
3	3:02	MSU	Plaxico Burress 15 yard pass from Bill Burke (Paul Edinger kick)	MSU 27–10
4	14:23	MICH	Anthony Thomas 2 yard run (Jeff Del Verne kick)	MSU 27–17
4	12:19	MSU	Dawan Moss 14 yard run (Paul Edinger kick)	MSU 34–17
4	8:11	MICH	David Terrell 19 yard pass from Tom Brady (Jeff Del Verne kick)	MSU 34–24
4	2:47	MICH	Aaron Shea 8 yard pass from Tom Brady (Jeff Del Verne kick)	MSU 34–31

Bill Burke threw for a school-record 400 yards and two touchdowns while Plaxico Burress set a new mark with 255 yards receiving. Burke broke Ed Smith's record of 369 against Indiana in 1979 while Burress surpassed Andre Rison's 252 yards against Georgia in 1989. Michigan State was now 6–0 for the first time since the 1966 national championship season. Michigan quarterbacks Tom Brady and Drew Henson combined for 396 passing yards, but the Michigan State defense held the Wolverines to six rushing yards for the game.

== Roster ==
1999 Michigan State Spartans football team roster
Players
Coaches
Offense

Pos.	#	Name	Class
TE	83	Chris Baker	So
QB	16	Bill Burke	Sr
WR	4	Plaxico Burress	Jr
C	51	Brian Grant	Jr
FB	00	Ericson Rico	So
OT	74	Tupe Peko	Jr
OT	76	Greg Randall	Sr
WR	86	Gari Scott	Sr

Defense

Pos.	#	Name	Class
CB	3	Amp Campbell	Sr
LB	8	T. J. Duckett	Fr
CB	15	Renaldo Hill	Jr
DB	9	Aric Morris	Sr
LB	98	Julian Peterson	Sr
DT	95	Josh Shaw	So
DE	91	Robaire Smith	Sr
LB	50	Josh Thornhill	So
LB	35	T. J. Turner	Jr

Special teams

Pos.	#	Name	Class
K	1	Paul Edinger	Sr
P	12	Craig Jarrett	So

Head coach

- Nick Saban (Regular season)
- Bobby Williams (bowl game)

Coordinators/assistant coaches

- Morris Watts – Offensive coordinator
- Bobby Williams – Running backs coach
- Pat Ruel – Offensive Line coach
- Bill Miller – Defensive coordinator
- Bill Sheridan – Linebackers coach
- Mark Dantonio – Defensive back coach
- Bob Casullo – Assistant
- Brad Lawing – Assistant
- Reggie Mitchell – Assistant
- Josh McDaniels – Graduate assistant
- Brian Daboll – Graduate assistant
- Fred Farrier – Graduate assistant

Legend

- (C) Team captain
- (S) Suspended
- (I) Ineligible
- Injured
- Redshirt

== 2000 NFL draft ==
The following players were selected in the 2000 NFL draft.

Player	Round	Pick	Position	NFL team
Plaxico Burress	1	8	Wide receiver	Pittsburgh Steelers
Julian Peterson	1	16	Linebacker	San Francisco 49ers
Gari Scott	4	99	Wide receiver	Philadelphia Eagles
Greg Randall	4	127	Tackle	New England Patriots
Aric Morris	5	135	Strong safety	Tennessee Titans
Paul Edinger	6	174	Kicker	Chicago Bears
Robaire Smith	6	197	Defensive tackle	Tennessee Titans
