= 2000 Florida Citrus Bowl =

American college football game

2000 Ourhouse.com Florida Citrus Bowl
Michigan State Spartans	Florida Gators
(9–2)	(9–3)
Big Ten	SEC
37	34
Head coach: Bobby Williams	Head coach: Steve Spurrier
AP / Coaches / BCS; 9 / 9 / 9	AP / Coaches / BCS; 10 / 10 / 10
	1	2	3	4	Total
Michigan State	3	17	6	11	37
Florida	7	14	6	7	34
- Date: January 1, 2000
- Season: 1999
- Stadium: Florida Citrus Bowl
- Location: Orlando, Florida
- MVP: Plaxico Burress (Michigan State WR)
- Referee: Courtney Mauzy (ACC)
- Attendance: 62,011

United States TV coverage
- Network: ABC
- Announcers: Brent Musburger (play-by-play); Gary Danielson (analyst); Jack Arute (sideline)

The 2000 Citrus Bowl was a college football bowl game following the 1999–2000 football season. The game matched the Michigan State Spartans against the Florida Gators.

Michigan State came into the game with new head coach Bobby Williams, who took over on December 6, six days after Nick Saban departed to take over the LSU program.

Michigan State wide receiver Plaxico Burress caught a career-high 13 passes for 185 yards and three touchdowns and Paul Edinger kicked a 39-yard field goal as time expired to lead the ninth-ranked Spartans to a 37–34 victory over the No. 10 Gators. Williams was later hired as the head coach of the Spartans.

== Scoring summary ==
=== 1st quarter ===
- Michigan State – Paul Edinger 46-yard field goal 4:41 left. MSU 3 UF 0
- Florida – Travis Taylor 12-yard pass from Doug Johnson (Jeff Chandler kick) 0:58 left. UF 7 MSU 3

=== 2nd quarter ===
- Michigan State – Plaxico Burress 37 pass from Bill Burke (Paul Edinger kick) 13:24 left. MSU 10 UF 7
- Michigan State – T.J. Turner 24-yard fumble recovery (Paul Edinger kick) 12:44 left. MSU 17 UF 7
- Florida – Travis Taylor 8-yard pass from Doug Johnson (Jeff Chandler kick) 8:12 left. MSU 17 UF 14
- Michigan State – Paul Edinger 20-yard field goal 3:09 left. MSU 20 UF 14
- Florida – Doug Johnson 1-yard run (Jeff Chandler kick) 0:33 left. UF 21 MSU 20

=== 3rd quarter ===
- Michigan State – Plaxico Burress 21-yard pass from Bill Burke (2-pt conversion failed) 1:10 left. MSU 26 UF 21
- Florida – Travis Taylor 39-yard pass from Doug Johnson (2-pt conversion failed) 0:03 left. UF 27 MSU 26

=== 4th quarter ===
- Florida – Robert Gillespie 2-yard run (Jeff Chandler kick) 13:27 left. UF 34 MSU 26
- Michigan State – Plaxico Burress 30-yard pass from Bill Burke (Gari Scott pass from Bill Burke) 10:46 left. MSU 34 UF 34
- Michigan State – Paul Edinger 39-yard field goal 0:00 left. MSU 37 UF 34

== Statistics ==
Statistic	MSU	UF
First downs	25	27
Rushing yards	143	67
Passing yards	257	300
Total yards	400	367
Punt return yards	13	0
Kickoff return yards	132	118
Passes (Att-Comp-Int)	35-21-2	51-25-0
Punts-Average	3-43.3	6-35.5
Fumbles-Lost	3-1	4-2
Penalties-Yards	7-80	10-100
Time of possession	32:49	27:11
