= Nick Saban =

American football coach (born 1951)

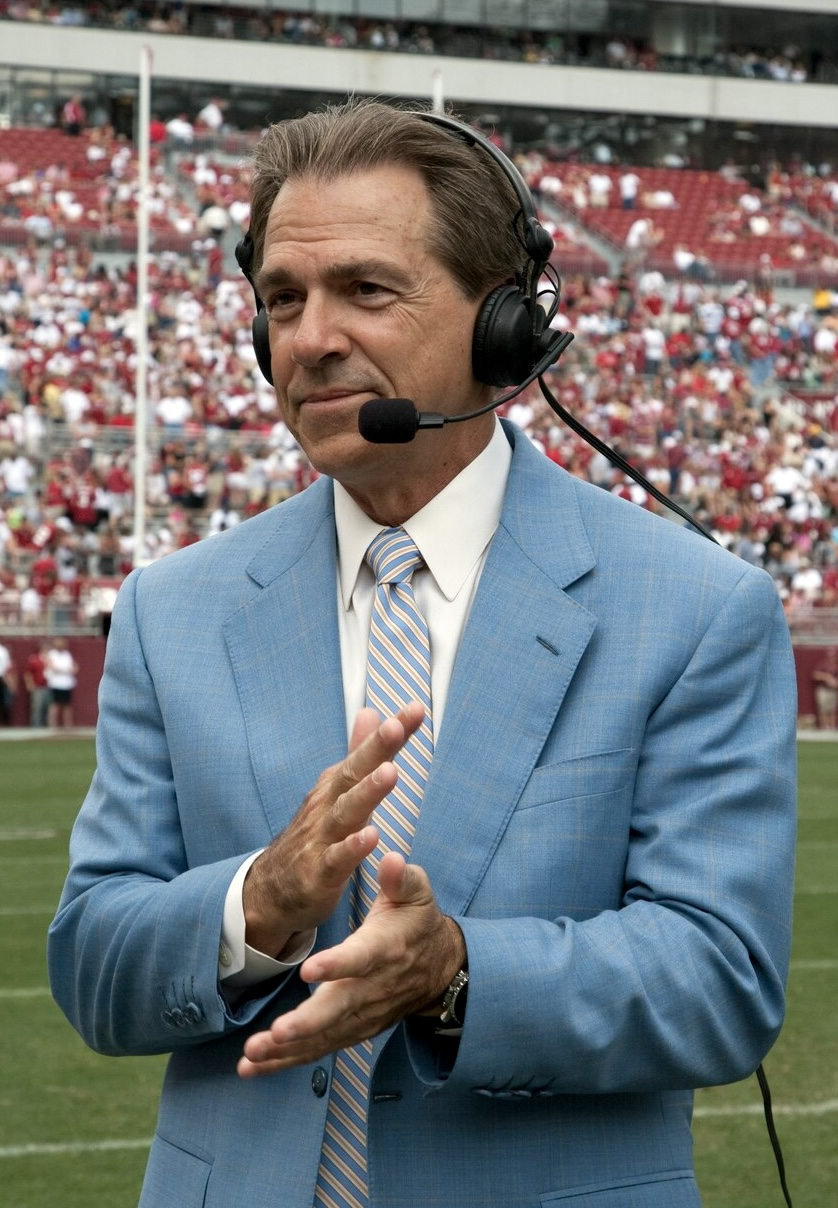
- Saban coaching Alabama in 2010

Biographical details
- Born: October 31, 1951 (age 75); Fairmont, West Virginia, U.S.

Playing career
- 1970–1972: Kent State
- Position: Defensive back

Coaching career (HC unless noted)
- 1973–1974: Kent State (GA)
- 1975–1976: Kent State (LB)
- 1977: Syracuse (OLB)
- 1978–1979: West Virginia (DB)
- 1980–1981: Ohio State (DB)
- 1982: Navy (DB)
- 1983–1987: Michigan State (DC/DB)
- 1988–1989: Houston Oilers (DB)
- 1990: Toledo
- 1991–1994: Cleveland Browns (DC)
- 1995–1999: Michigan State
- 2000–2004: LSU
- 2005–2006: Miami Dolphins
- 2007–2023: Alabama

Head coaching record
- Overall: 292–71–1 (college) (Note: Saban's on-the-field record in 2007 was 7–6 (4–4 SEC). The NCAA ruled that Alabama must vacate 21 victories due to sanctions stemming from textbook-related infractions. The infractions, and 16 of the vacated victories, began under previous coach Mike Shula, and continued until they were discovered during the 2007 season, Saban's first at Alabama, and thus the official NCAA record for that year reflects a 2–6 mark.); 15–17 (NFL)
- Bowls: 19–12
- Tournaments: 9–5 (CFP)

Accomplishments and honors

Championships
- 7 national (2003, 2009, 2011, 2012, 2015, 2017, 2020); MAC (1990); 11 SEC (2001, 2003, 2009, 2012, 2014–2016, 2018, 2020, 2021, 2023); 16 SEC Western Division (2001–2003, 2008, 2009, 2012–2018, 2020–2023)

Awards
- ESPY Icon Award (2024); George Munger Award (2016); Bobby Dodd Coach of the Year (2014); 3× Bobby Bowden Coach of the Year (2009, 2011, 2012); 2× Walter Camp Coach of the Year (2008, 2018); Home Depot Coach of the Year (2008); Sporting News Coach of the Year (2008); Liberty Mutual Coach of the Year (2008); 2× Paul "Bear" Bryant Award (2003, 2020); 2× AP College Football Coach of the Year (2003, 2008); 2× Eddie Robinson Coach of the Year (2003, 2008); 5× SEC Coach of the Year (2003, 2008, 2009, 2016, 2020); Alabama Sports Hall of Fame (2013); Louisiana Sports Hall of Fame (2025); MAC Hall of Fame (2024)
- College Football Hall of Fame; Inducted in 2025 (profile)

Nicholas Lou Saban Jr. (/ˈseɪbən/ SAY-bən; born October 31, 1951) is an American sportscaster and former football coach. He serves as an analyst for ESPN's College GameDay, a television program covering college football. He is widely regarded as one of the greatest college football coaches in history and is frequently considered the greatest of all time. Saban served as head coach of the National Football League (NFL)'s Miami Dolphins and at four universities: the University of Toledo, Michigan State University, Louisiana State University (LSU), and most famously the University of Alabama, where he coached from 2007 to 2023 and led the team to six claimed national championships and one unclaimed championship in nine championship appearances during that period, as well as 9 SEC titles and 10 SEC Western Division championships.

As a college football head coach, Saban won seven claimed national titles and one unclaimed national title, the most in college football history. His first came when he led the LSU Tigers to the BCS National Championship in 2003. He then coached the Alabama Crimson Tide to BCS and AP national championships in 2009, 2011, 2012, and to College Football Playoff championships in 2015, 2017 and 2020 with Alabama also having an unclaimed National Championship in 2016 that was selected by Colley. He became the first coach in college football history to win a national championship with two different Football Bowl Subdivision (FBS) schools since the inception of the AP Poll in 1936. Saban and Bear Bryant are the only coaches to win an SEC championship at two different schools. Saban's career record as a college head coach is 292–71–1.

Saban was inducted into the Independence Hall of Honor in 2008, Alabama Sports Hall of Fame in 2013 and the Louisiana Sports Hall of Fame in 2025. He coached four Heisman Trophy winners at Alabama: Mark Ingram II (2009), Derrick Henry (2015), DeVonta Smith (2020), and Bryce Young (2021). In 2025, Saban was inducted into the College Football Hall of Fame as a coach.

== Early life and education ==
Saban was born in Fairmont, West Virginia, to Mary and Nick Lou Saban Sr. and grew up in the nearby town of Monongah. His parents owned a small service station and his father founded and coached a youth football team. He has one sister, Dianna, and graduated from Monongah High School in 1969. In high school, Saban played football. He played quarterback and helped lead Monongah to the 1968 West Virginia Class A state championship his senior year. Among his teammates were Kerry Marbury, who went on to star for the West Virginia Mountaineers and play in the Canadian Football League.

Saban attended Kent State University in Kent, Ohio, and played defensive back for the Golden Flashes under coach Don James. He and a roommate avoided being part of the Kent State shootings, on May 4, 1970, when they decided to eat lunch before walking to the rally area. While attending KSU, he married Terry Constable, also from West Virginia, on December 18, 1971 in Fairmont. Saban graduated from Kent State in 1973 with a bachelor's degree in business, and in 1975, earned his master's degree in sports administration, also from Kent State. Saban's father died during his son's first year of graduate school.

Saban is of Croatian ancestry. His paternal grandfather, Stanko Saban, was born in 1895 in Gospić, in the Lika region of Croatia. Stanko emigrated to Portland, Oregon, in 1908, when he was 13 years old. He later married Anna Mihalic, of Croatian-American heritage.

== Coaching career ==
=== Early coaching career ===
Saban had not intended to enter the coaching ranks until Don James hired him as a graduate assistant at Kent State, while Saban waited for his wife to graduate. He later served as an assistant coach in NCAA Division I-A, at several schools: Syracuse in 1977, West Virginia in 1978 and 1979, Ohio State in 1980 and 1981, Navy in 1982, and Michigan State from 1983 to 1987. After the 1987 season, Kent State passed over Saban for its vacant head coaching position and hired Dick Crum. Saban was then hired as an assistant for the Houston Oilers in the National Football League.

=== Toledo ===
Saban began his career as a head coach when he was hired by the University of Toledo on December 22, 1989. Coming off of 6–5 seasons in both 1988 and 1989, the Rockets found quick success under Nick Saban in 1990. With a 9–2 season, Toledo was co-champion of the Mid-American Conference. The two games the Rockets lost that season were by narrow margins: one point to Central Michigan and four points to Navy. While coaching in Toledo, Saban turned down an application from future head coach Urban Meyer, who was looking for any coaching job on Saban's staff.

=== Cleveland Browns ===
The following February, Saban resigned as Toledo's head coach after only one season in order to become defensive coordinator of the Cleveland Browns under head coach Bill Belichick. He remained in that position for four seasons. Saban helped lead the 1994 defensive unit for the Browns that was the best in the NFL in points allowed. Saban later said these four years were the "worst of my life".

=== Michigan State ===
==== 1995–1997 seasons ====
Saban became head coach of Michigan State prior to the 1995 season. Michigan State had not had a winning season since 1990, and the team was sanctioned by the NCAA for recruiting violations that were committed under his predecessor and former mentor, George Perles. Beginning in 1995, Saban moderately improved Michigan State's fortunes, taking the Spartans to bowl games in each of his first three seasons. From 1995 to 1997, Michigan State finished 6–5–1, 6–6, and 7–5.

==== 1998 season ====
On November 7, 1998, the Spartans upset the No. 1 ranked Ohio State Buckeyes 28–24 at Ohio Stadium. However, even after the upset and an early-season rout of then-highly ranked Notre Dame the Spartans finished 6–6, including three last-minute losses featuring turnovers, defensive lapses, and special-teams misplays, and failed to earn a bowl invitation.

==== 1999 season ====
Saban led the 1999 Spartans to a 9–2 season that included wins over Notre Dame, Michigan, Ohio State, and Penn State. The two losses were routs at the hands of Purdue and Wisconsin. Following the final regular-season game against Penn State, Saban abruptly resigned to accept the head coaching position with LSU. Saban's assistant head coach and successor, Bobby Williams, coached the Spartans to a Citrus Bowl victory over Florida, giving the Spartans an overall record of 10–2 for the 1999 season. It was the most wins for the Spartans in a season since 1965, and the Spartans reached their highest ranking since the 1966 team. Future NFL head coach Josh McDaniels served as a graduate assistant on Saban's 1999 coaching staff.

=== LSU ===
==== 2000 season ====
In November 1999, LSU named Nick Saban as their 31st head football coach. In 2000, the Tigers went 8–4 and won the Peach Bowl over Georgia Tech. The season was somewhat marred by several lopsided losses, including a 34–17 loss to the Auburn Tigers, and a 41–9 loss to the Florida Gators.

==== 2001 season ====
Saban led LSU to a 10–3 record in 2001, including an SEC Championship and a Sugar Bowl victory. After a 35–24 loss to the Ole Miss Rebels, the Tigers finished the year with six straight wins, including a 31–20 win over #2 Tennessee in the 2001 SEC Championship Game, and a 47–34 win over Illinois in the 2002 Sugar Bowl. It was the first outright SEC championship for LSU since 1986, and the first time the Tigers had won the Sugar Bowl since 1968.

==== 2002 season ====
The 2002 season opened with high expectations, but a 26–8 loss at the hands of Virginia Tech in the Tigers' season opener raised serious questions about their outlook. However, the Tigers would rebound to win their next six straight, but after a mid-season injury to quarterback Matt Mauck, LSU lost four of its last six games to close the season, including a 21–20 loss at Arkansas, which knocked the Tigers out of the SEC Championship Game. LSU also suffered a 35–20 loss to Texas in the Cotton Bowl Classic, and finished 8–5.

==== 2003 season ====
The 2003 Tigers started the season with five wins, including a 17–10 victory in Tiger Stadium over the defending SEC champion, and then-undefeated, Georgia Bulldogs. LSU lost the following week to Florida, 19–7. After the loss to Florida, LSU did not lose again in the regular season and ended its regular season with a win over the Arkansas Razorbacks to win the SEC West. After winning the SEC West, the Tigers defeated the Georgia Bulldogs 34–13 in the SEC Championship Game in Atlanta. They were ranked No. 2 in the BCS standings and advanced to play the BCS No. 1 Oklahoma Sooners in the Sugar Bowl, which was the host of the BCS Championship Game in 2003. The Tigers won the game 21–14. The win gave LSU the BCS national championship and a 13–1 finish for the season. The 13 wins for LSU set a new single-season record, breaking the mark of 11 wins set by the 1958 National Championship team.

==== 2004 season ====
LSU finished the 2004 season 9–3, after losing to the Iowa Hawkeyes in the Capital One Bowl 30–25 on a final play touchdown pass. Other losses that season were on the road at Auburn 10–9, and a loss on the road to Georgia 45–16. At the end of the 2004 season, Saban left LSU to coach the Miami Dolphins.

=== Miami Dolphins ===
==== 2005 season ====
Saban accepted the head coaching position for the Miami Dolphins on December 25, 2004. He was the sixth coach in the franchise's history. The Nick Saban era officially kicked off with a 34–10 win over the Denver Broncos in 2005. From there, the Dolphins struggled, losing seven of their next nine games to fall to 3–7. The two wins came over the Carolina Panthers and the New Orleans Saints, a game that took place in Tiger Stadium due to Hurricane Katrina. After a frustrating two months, however, the Dolphins would rally late in the season, as they won their final six games, including a 28–26 win to end the season in Foxboro, Massachusetts, over the New England Patriots. The team finished the year with a 9–7 record, and narrowly missed the playoffs in Saban's first season.

==== 2006 season ====
Going into the 2006 season, the Dolphins were expected to contend for a playoff spot. The season, however, turned out to be unsuccessful. The Dolphins were considering quarterback Drew Brees, who had just been released from the San Diego Chargers due to a career-threatening shoulder injury and subsequent contract dispute, but instead traded for Daunte Culpepper, who was still recovering from a knee injury from the previous season. Saban later said that the team's decision to pass on Brees was the moment he knew that he would leave the team.

Culpepper never fully recovered and was ultimately benched after the fourth game of the season, when the Dolphins lost to the Houston Texans. He was eventually put on injured reserve. After starting the season 1–6, however, the Dolphins got hot. They won four straight games, including wins over the Chicago Bears, who were previously unbeaten and made it to the Super Bowl that year, and the Kansas City Chiefs. Suddenly, the Dolphins were back in the playoff hunt at 5–6, but a 24–10 loss the following week to the Jacksonville Jaguars all but ended their playoff hopes.

The Dolphins rebounded the following week with a 21–0 win over the New England Patriots, the Dolphins' last victory of the 2006 season. Quarterback Joey Harrington was eventually benched in favor of third-string quarterback Cleo Lemon. The defense ranked as a top-five unit in points and yards allowed. However, the offense was anemic, with the only bright spot being running back Ronnie Brown, who gained over 1,000 rushing yards on the season. The Dolphins lost their next two games to the Buffalo Bills and the New York Jets to finish 6–10, Saban's first losing season as a head coach.

On November 27, 2006, the University of Alabama announced the firing of head coach Mike Shula. Saban was rumored to be at the top of Alabama's wish list, but he refused to discuss the job while his NFL season was still underway. During the month of December 2006, Saban was repeatedly questioned by the media about the Alabama job, and he repeatedly denied the rumors in his weekly press conferences, stating on December 21 "I guess I have to say it. I'm not going to be the Alabama coach." But his wife Terry talked Nick into having a meeting with Mal Moore. Saban met with Alabama officials on January 1, 2007, which was shortly after the Dolphins' season-ending loss to the Indianapolis Colts.

=== Alabama ===
==== 2007 season ====
On January 3, 2007, following a meeting with Dolphins owner Wayne Huizenga, Saban announced that he had accepted an offer to become Alabama's 27th head coach. His initial eight-year contract totaling US$32 million made him one of the highest-paid football coaches, professional or collegiate, in the United States at the time. On January 4, at a press conference on the Alabama campus, Saban was officially introduced as the head football coach of The University of Alabama. On September 1, 2007, his Crimson Tide opened the season with a 52–6 win over the Western Carolina Catamounts, scoring more points than during any game in the 2006 season. Saban became the fifth Alabama coach since 1900 to start his first season 3–0, earning a win over then-ranked No. 16 Arkansas Razorbacks. Alabama ended the regular season with a 6–6 record, including a four-game losing streak, a particularly humiliating loss at home to Louisiana-Monroe, and a sixth straight loss to Auburn in the Iron Bowl. All six of Alabama's losses were by seven points or fewer. The Crimson Tide defeated Colorado in the 2007 Independence Bowl, 30–24, to end the year 7–6.

==== 2008 season ====
During his second year as head coach of the Tide, Saban led his team from a sub-par season in 2007 to a perfect 12–0 regular season record. Saban finished the regular season undefeated for the first time in his career as a head coach as he led the Crimson Tide to its first undefeated regular season since 1994. He appeared on the September 1, 2008, cover of Forbes magazine as "The Most Powerful Coach in Sports."

His second season as Alabama head coach began with a 34–10 victory over the No. 9 ranked Clemson Tigers in the Chick-fil-A College Kickoff in the Georgia Dome. Alabama won the next two games against Tulane and Western Kentucky before entering SEC play. In the following game, Alabama had a convincing 49–14 road-win over Arkansas. The Tide followed that victory with a 41–30 win over the No. 3 ranked Georgia Bulldogs. After the Georgia game, the Tide won consecutive home games against the Kentucky Wildcats and the Ole Miss Rebels and finished the month of October with a 29–9 victory over the Tennessee Volunteers. Following a 35–0 homecoming victory over Arkansas State, the Crimson Tide rose to No. 1 in all major polls in Week 10‍—‌following a loss by No. 1 Texas to the Texas Tech Red Raiders. It was the first time since the 1980 season that Alabama held the top spot during the regular season.

The Tide took their No. 1 ranking into Baton Rouge, Louisiana, and came out with a 27–21 overtime victory over LSU. With the win, Alabama clinched its first SEC Western Division championship since 1999 and guaranteed the team a trip to the 2008 SEC Championship Game. The Tide then improved to 11–0 with a win at home over Mississippi State. To finish the regular season, Bama defeated in-state rival Auburn, 36–0, the largest margin of victory in the series since 1962. It was Alabama's first victory over Auburn since the 2001 season. In the SEC Championship Game, Alabama suffered its first defeat in a 31–20 loss to the SEC Eastern Division champion Florida Gators (who later won the 2008 BCS Championship), and closed out the season with a 31–17 loss to Utah in the Sugar Bowl to finish the season at 12–2. For his efforts during the season, Saban received several Coach of the Year awards.

==== 2009 season ====
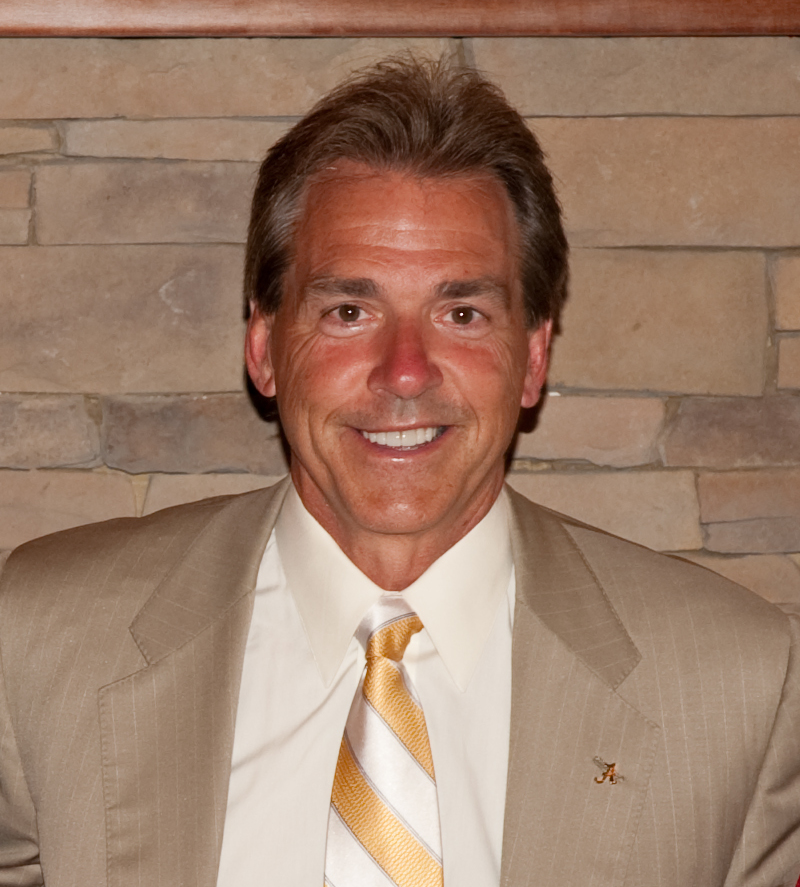
Saban in May 2009

No. 5 Alabama began Saban's third year by defeating the No. 7 ranked Virginia Tech Hokies in the Chick-fil-A Kickoff Game, 34–24. The Crimson Tide followed up with wins over Florida International and North Texas. The following week Alabama won its conference opener over Arkansas, 35–7. In its fifth game of the year, Alabama beat Kentucky, 38–20. The sixth game of the season featured a hard-fought defensive battle with Bama defeating Ole Miss, 22–3. The seventh game was the same as Alabama defeated the South Carolina Gamecocks, 20–6. The next day, Alabama moved up to No. 1 in the AP poll for the second straight year. The next week Alabama defeated Tennessee 12–10. Terrence Cody blocked Tennessee's game-winning field goal attempt with four seconds left, sealing the victory and improving the team's record to 8–0.

After a bye week, Alabama clinched its second straight SEC Western Division championship by knocking off LSU, 24–15. The next week Alabama defeated Mississippi State, 31–3, securing the second straight 10-win season for Alabama. Following a 45–0 shutout of Chattanooga, on Black Friday, Alabama came from behind to defeat Gene Chizik's Auburn Tigers, 26–21, marking the first time since 1973–1974 Alabama had finished the regular season undefeated in consecutive years, and the first consecutive 12-win seasons.

The Crimson Tide defeated the Florida Gators in the SEC Championship, 32–13, in a rematch of the previous year's championship game. The championship represented Alabama's 22nd SEC title and its first since 1999. Saban's Crimson Tide ended the season with a 37–21 victory over the Texas Longhorns in the 2010 BCS National Championship Game to finish a perfect 14–0 to give Alabama their first National Championship since 1992. The 2009 Crimson Tide set a school record for single-season victories with 14.

The win secured Saban's second national championship and Alabama's 13th, and its first in the BCS era. At the on-campus celebration, Saban famously stated "I want everybody here to know, this is not the end. This is the beginning." Following the victory over the Longhorns, the University of Alabama announced that it would unveil a statue of Saban in the week prior to the kickoff of the 2010 season. On April 16, 2011, a life-sized bronzed statue of Saban was unveiled at the 2011 A-Day spring game, making him Alabama's fifth coach to be immortalized outside the north end zone of Bryant–Denny Stadium.

Saban during Alabama's 2010 "A-Day" game

==== 2010 season ====
At the start of his fourth season, Alabama was overwhelmingly chosen as the preseason No. 1 team in both the AP and Coaches Poll. It was the first time since 1978 that the Crimson Tide started the season ranked No. 1. In the season opener in front a record crowd of 101,821, Alabama defeated San Jose State, 48–3. The following week, the Tide defeated Joe Paterno and the #23 Penn State 24–3 in their first meeting since 1990. The next week against Duke, Mark Ingram II made his first start of the 2010 season leading Alabama to a 62–13 victory. The next week Alabama overcame a 20–7 deficit to win its conference opener against #10 Arkansas, 24–20. On October 2, Alabama defeated #7 Florida 31–6. The following week Alabama lost to #19 South Carolina 35–21, snapping a 19-game win streak.

Alabama bounced back with a 23–10 win over Ole Miss, and followed that up with a 41–10 victory over Tennessee. After a bye week, Alabama suffered its second loss of the season, losing to #10 LSU, 24–21. The following week, Alabama bounced back at home defeating #17 Mississippi State, 30–10. The following week Alabama defeated Georgia State 63–7, the most points for Alabama since 1979. In the Iron Bowl, Alabama lost to in-state rival (and eventual BCS champions) #2 Auburn 28–27, snapping a 20-game home winning streak.

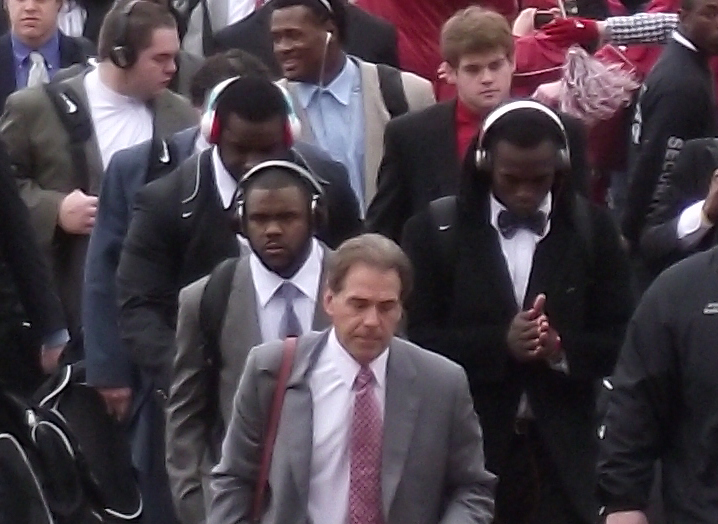
Saban leads the "Walk of Champions" prior to the 2010 Iron Bowl

In winning the game, Auburn overcame a 24–0 second quarter Alabama lead, thus marking the largest deficit any team had overcome to defeat the Crimson Tide in its football program's history. Alabama was selected to play in the 2011 Capital One Bowl and in their first-ever meeting, Alabama defeated #7 Michigan State 49–7 in the largest margin of victory in that bowl game's history. The bowl victory brought Alabama to 10–3 on the season and secured Alabama's third consecutive 10-win season.

==== 2011 season ====
At the start of his fifth season, Alabama came into the season ranked No. 2 in the country in the AP Poll and Coaches Poll. In the first game of the season, Alabama defeated Saban's alma mater Kent State 48–7. The next week, Alabama traveled to Penn State for the first time since 1989 and defeated Joe Paterno and #23 Nittany Lions 27–11. Alabama recorded its first shutout of the season by defeating North Texas 41–0. In the conference opener, Alabama defeated #12 Arkansas 38–14.

The next week Alabama traveled to The Swamp and defeated the 12th-ranked Florida Gators 38–10. The following week at homecoming, Alabama shut out Vanderbilt, defeating them 34–0. Alabama traveled to Oxford and destroyed Ole Miss 52–7. In week 8, Alabama defeated their rival Tennessee 37–6 by scoring 31 unanswered points in the second half. After a bye week, Alabama played host to #1 LSU, losing in overtime 9–6, a Game of the Century matchup between conference teams ranked No. 1 and No. 2.

Alabama rebounded the next week after struggling in the first half, with a win over Mississippi State 24–7. The next week, Alabama defeated FCS 3rd ranked Georgia Southern 45–21 on Senior Day. This win gave Saban his fourth consecutive 10-win season, tying Bear Bryant from 1977 to 1980. In the Iron Bowl, Alabama defeated Auburn 42–14. On December 4, Alabama was selected to face LSU in the BCS National Championship Game by finishing No. 2 in the final BCS rankings, the first time in college football history that two teams from the same conference (much less the same division of the same conference) played each other for the BCS Championship.

In the rematch, Alabama defeated the Tigers 21–0 with a dominating defensive performance, improving Saban's record to 3–3 against Les Miles and his former employer, LSU. The win secured Saban his third BCS Championship, his second with Alabama, and the 14th National Championship for the Alabama football team. He is the only coach in college football to win three BCS Championships and the first coach since Nebraska's Tom Osborne to win three National Championships.

==== 2012 season ====
At the start of his sixth season, Alabama came into the season ranked No. 2 in both preseason polls for the second consecutive year. Alabama opened the season at Cowboys Stadium against #8 Michigan in the first meeting between the schools since the 2000 Orange Bowl with Alabama winning 41–14. The next week, Alabama moved up to No. 1 in both polls, marking the fifth consecutive year the Tide reached the top spot. A few days later, Alabama shut out Western Kentucky 35–0. Alabama opened up conference play the next week by routing Arkansas 52–0 in their sixth consecutive win over the Razorbacks.

In week 4, Alabama defeated Florida Atlantic 40–7. The next week, the Tide defeated Ole Miss 33–14. After a bye week, Alabama traveled to Columbia, Missouri, for the first time since 1978 and defeated the Missouri Tigers 42–10 in their first meeting as conference opponents. The next week Alabama defeated their rival Tennessee 44–13 for the sixth consecutive year. On homecoming, Alabama beat undefeated #13 Mississippi State 38–7.

In a rematch of the 2012 BCS National Championship Game, Alabama overcame a late deficit with less than a minute remaining to defeat #5 LSU 21–17. The next week, Alabama suffered their first loss of the season to new conference member #15 Texas A&M 29–24. Alabama rebounded the following week recording its third shutout of the season defeating Western Carolina 49–0. The win secured Alabama's fifth consecutive 10-win season, tying the longest streak from 1971 to 1975.

In the Iron Bowl, Alabama defeated Auburn 49–0 to secure its third SEC Western Division championship under Saban. It is the second biggest margin of victory in the rivalry's history and first shutout since 2008. It was Alabama's fourth shutout of the season (second time back-to-back) and second year in a row the Tide finished the regular season 11–1. In the SEC Championship, Alabama overcame a late drive by #3 Georgia to defeat the Bulldogs 32–28, winning the school's 23rd conference title. The 2012 title was Alabama's first conference championship since 2009 and Saban's fourth overall. The win also clinched a spot in a BCS bowl game for the fourth time in five years.

On December 2, Alabama finished second in the final BCS rankings for the second consecutive season. On January 7, 2013, No. 2 Alabama faced #1 Notre Dame in the first meeting between the schools since 1987, defeating the Irish 42–14 in the 2013 BCS National Championship Game. The win gave Alabama their 15th national championship and their third championship in four years. Alabama won back-to-back national titles for the first time since 1978 and 1979. The title was Saban's fourth national championship and his third with the Crimson Tide, tying him with Wallace Wade for second all-time at Alabama.

==== 2013 season ====
As the 2013 campaign began, Saban's Crimson Tide was ranked No. 1 in both the AP and Coaches preseason polls for the first time since 2010. In the Chick-fil-A Kickoff Game, Alabama defeated Virginia Tech 35–10 at the Georgia Dome in Atlanta. Following a bye week, Alabama traveled to College Station, Texas, to pick up its first conference win, defeating #6 Texas A&M, 49–42, in a wild shootout that Alabama had lost the year before. The Crimson Tide went on to defeat Colorado State, which was coached by Alabama's former offensive coordinator Jim McElwain, 31–6. #21 Ole Miss Rebels was next up for Alabama, which shut out the Rebels 25–0 for its tenth straight win in the series. The following week saw Alabama beat Georgia State 45–3.

Alabama went on the road and defeated Kentucky 48–7. Alabama defeated Arkansas for the seventh consecutive year and by a score of 52–0 for the second consecutive year. In the Third Saturday in October, The Tide defeated Tennessee 45–10 to win its seventh consecutive game over the Vols. Following their second bye week, Alabama took on #10 LSU and Saban improved his record to 5–3 against the Tigers, as Alabama won 38–17. The Crimson Tide defeated Mississippi State 20–7 in a defensive bout. The win gave Alabama its sixth straight ten-win season, the longest in school history. On Senior Day, the Tide knocked off FCS opponent Chattanooga 49–0.

The next game was the Iron Bowl, which was hosted by #4 Auburn in a matchup between top five teams. The game was tied 28–28 with only a single second remaining in regulation, as Alabama and Auburn appeared headed for overtime. Extra time was not necessary as Saban decided to attempt a 56-yard field goal instead of either running out the clock or attempting a Hail Mary from Auburn's 39-yard line. The decision proved costly, as the field goal was short but caught nine yards deep in the Auburn end zone by the Tigers' Chris Davis, who returned the failed attempt 109 yards for a touchdown as time expired. The 28–34 loss knocked Alabama out of contention for the SEC Championship and dashed The Tide's hope for a national championship.

Alabama finished the regular season 11–1 for the third consecutive year. At the end of the regular season, Alabama finished ranked No. 3 in the final BCS rankings and earned an at-large bid to the 2014 Sugar Bowl. Alabama accepted an invitation to play in its third straight BCS bowl game and fifth in Saban's seven seasons at Alabama. In the Sugar Bowl, Alabama lost to #11 Oklahoma 45–31. This was Saban's second bowl loss at Alabama and first since the 2009 Sugar Bowl against Utah. The Tide finished the season at 11–2.

==== 2014 season ====
Starting in his eighth season, Alabama began the year ranked No. 2 in the preseason AP and Coaches Poll for the third time in four years. It was the fifth straight season the Crimson Tide started the year in the top two and the seventh consecutive year in the top five. In the season opener, Alabama improved to 4–0 in the Chick-fil-A Kickoff Game beating West Virginia 33–23 in the first meeting between the two schools. The Tide won their home opener the next week over Florida Atlantic 41–0 after the game was called in the fourth quarter due to lightning. The following week they defeated Southern Miss 52–12. In their conference opener, Alabama put up 645 yards of offense beating Florida 42–21.

Following a bye week, Alabama was voted No. 1 in the Coaches Poll marking the seventh consecutive season Alabama has reached the top spot. Alabama suffered their first loss of the season losing to #11 Ole Miss 23–17 which ended a 10-game win streak against the Rebels. In Saban's 100th game with the Tide, Alabama bounced back, narrowly defeating Arkansas 14–13 for its eighth consecutive victory in the series. The next week the Tide dominated #21 Texas A&M shutting them out 59–0 which is the fourth-largest victory in school history. In their annual rivalry with Tennessee, Alabama won their eighth straight over the Vols 34–20.

After a second bye week, Alabama traveled to Baton Rouge to play #14 LSU. After a late field goal, Alabama sent the game into overtime defeating the Tigers 20–13. In a matchup of top five teams, Alabama defeated #1 Mississippi State 25–20 marking the first time Alabama has defeated an AP No. 1 team at home. Alabama defeated FCS opponent Western Carolina 48–14. The win secured Alabama its seventh consecutive ten-win season. In the Iron Bowl, Alabama avenged their only regular season loss of last season defeating their in-state rival #15 Auburn 55–44, the most points scored in the rivalry's history.

The Tide finished the regular season 11–1 for the fourth straight season and won the SEC West. It was Saban's fifth division title at Alabama. In the 2014 SEC Championship Game, Saban won his 5th SEC title (3rd with Alabama) defeating #14 Missouri 42–13. It was Alabama's 24th SEC championship and first since 2012. Alabama was selected for the first College Football Playoff as the No. 1 seed and played the No. 4 seed Ohio State in the Sugar Bowl, losing 42–35. The loss was Saban's third in Sugar Bowls at Alabama. The Tide finished the season at 12–2.

==== 2015 season ====
In his ninth season, Saban and Alabama began the year ranked No. 3 in the preseason AP and Coaches Poll, marking the eighth straight year the Tide began the season in the top five. It was their lowest preseason ranking since 2009. In the season opener against #20 Wisconsin, Alabama won, 35–17, in Arlington, Texas. In their home opener, the Tide defeated Middle Tennessee, 37–10. In the conference opener, Alabama lost a back-and-forth struggle to #15 Ole Miss, 43–37. The following week Alabama bounced back with a 34–0 win over Louisiana Monroe. The Tide picked up a conference win dominating #8 Georgia, 38–10. Alabama defeated Arkansas 27–14 for its ninth consecutive win in the series.

The following week behind a strong defensive performance, the Tide beat #9 Texas A&M 41–23. In the annual Third Saturday in October meeting, the Tide narrowly defeated Tennessee 19–14 with a fourth-quarter comeback to get its ninth consecutive win in the rivalry. After the bye week, Alabama hosted #2 LSU in a matchup of top-five teams, winning 30–16. The Tide beat #20 Mississippi State, 31–6, for the eighth straight year. Next, Alabama defeated FCS opponent Charleston Southern, 56–6, to secure Saban's eighth consecutive 10-win season.

In the Iron Bowl, Alabama defeated in-state rival Auburn, 29–13, to secure the SEC West. The Tide finished the regular season 11–1 for the fifth straight season. In the SEC Championship, Saban secured his sixth conference title when the Tide defeated #18 Florida 29–15. It was Alabama's 25th conference championship, second consecutive title and third in four years. Alabama for the second straight year was selected to the College Football Playoff and represented as the #2 seed. On December 12, running back Derrick Henry became Saban's second player to win the Heisman Trophy.

In the College Football Playoff semifinal at the Cotton Bowl, Alabama shut out the #3 seed Michigan State, 38–0. The win was Alabama's first in the College Football Playoff and marked Alabama's first appearance in a national championship game since the 2012 season. Alabama went on to defeat unbeaten #1 Clemson, 45–40, to win the College Football Playoff National Championship. The victory marked Alabama's 16th national title and fourth in seven seasons. It was Saban's fifth national title and fourth at Alabama. The Tide finished the season at 14–1.

==== 2016 season ====
Alabama started Saban's tenth season ranked #1 in the AP and Coaches Poll. 2016 was the ninth consecutive year Alabama was #1 at some point in the season. In their first meeting since the 1985 Aloha Bowl, Alabama dominated traditional power #20 USC, 52–6, in the Advocare Classic at Arlington, Texas. In their home opener, the Tide took down Western Kentucky, 38–10. In the conference opener, Alabama avenged their last two regular-season losses, defeating #19 Ole Miss 48–43. The next week Saban took on his alma mater Kent State with a 48–0 shutout. On homecoming, Alabama defeated Kentucky 34–6. The next week Saban picked up his 10th consecutive victory over Arkansas, winning 49–30.

In the annual Third Saturday in October, Alabama dominated #9 Tennessee 49–10, to win its tenth in a row over the Vols. In their second straight game versus a top-10 opponent, Alabama defeated #6 Texas A&M 33–14. After a bye week, the Tide went to Baton Rouge to face #15 LSU. In a defensive slugfest, Alabama shut out the Tigers 10–0. The win was also Alabama's sixth in a row over LSU and the first shutout over them since the 2012 BCS National Championship Game. The following week Alabama defeated Mississippi State 51–3. The win gave Saban his ninth consecutive season winning 10 or more games. With a win by Georgia over #9 Auburn, the Tide secured their third consecutive SEC Western Division championship, seventh for Saban at Alabama, and tenth overall for his career.

The next week the Tide defeated FCS opponent Chattanooga 31–3. In the Iron Bowl, Saban secured an undefeated regular season by defeating in-state rival #16 Auburn 30–12. This was Alabama's third straight win over the Tigers, the first time since 1990–1992. Alabama finished its regular season 12–0 for the third time in Saban's career at Alabama and first since 2009. In the SEC Championship, Alabama defeated #15 Florida in a rematch of the previous season's title game, 54–16. The win gave Alabama its 26th SEC title, 5th for Saban at Alabama and 7th overall for his career. This was Alabama's third straight conference championship, the first time it had won three straight SEC titles since 1977–1979, and its first three-peat since the SEC Championship Game was added in 1992.

Alabama made the College Football Playoff for the third consecutive year and came in as the #1 seed for the second time. The Tide was selected to play in the Peach Bowl against the #4 seed Washington Huskies. In the first meeting with the Huskies since the 1986 Sun Bowl, Alabama won 24–7. In a rematch of the previous season's National Championship game, Alabama fell short to #2 Clemson 35–31 when the Tigers scored on a game-winning touchdown pass with one second left on the clock. Alabama failed to recover Clemson's onside kick and time ran out. The loss snapped Alabama's 26-game winning streak and was Saban's first loss in a title game. The Tide finished the season at 14–1 and were later named national champions by Colley Matrix, though this championship is unclaimed by Alabama.

==== 2017 season ====
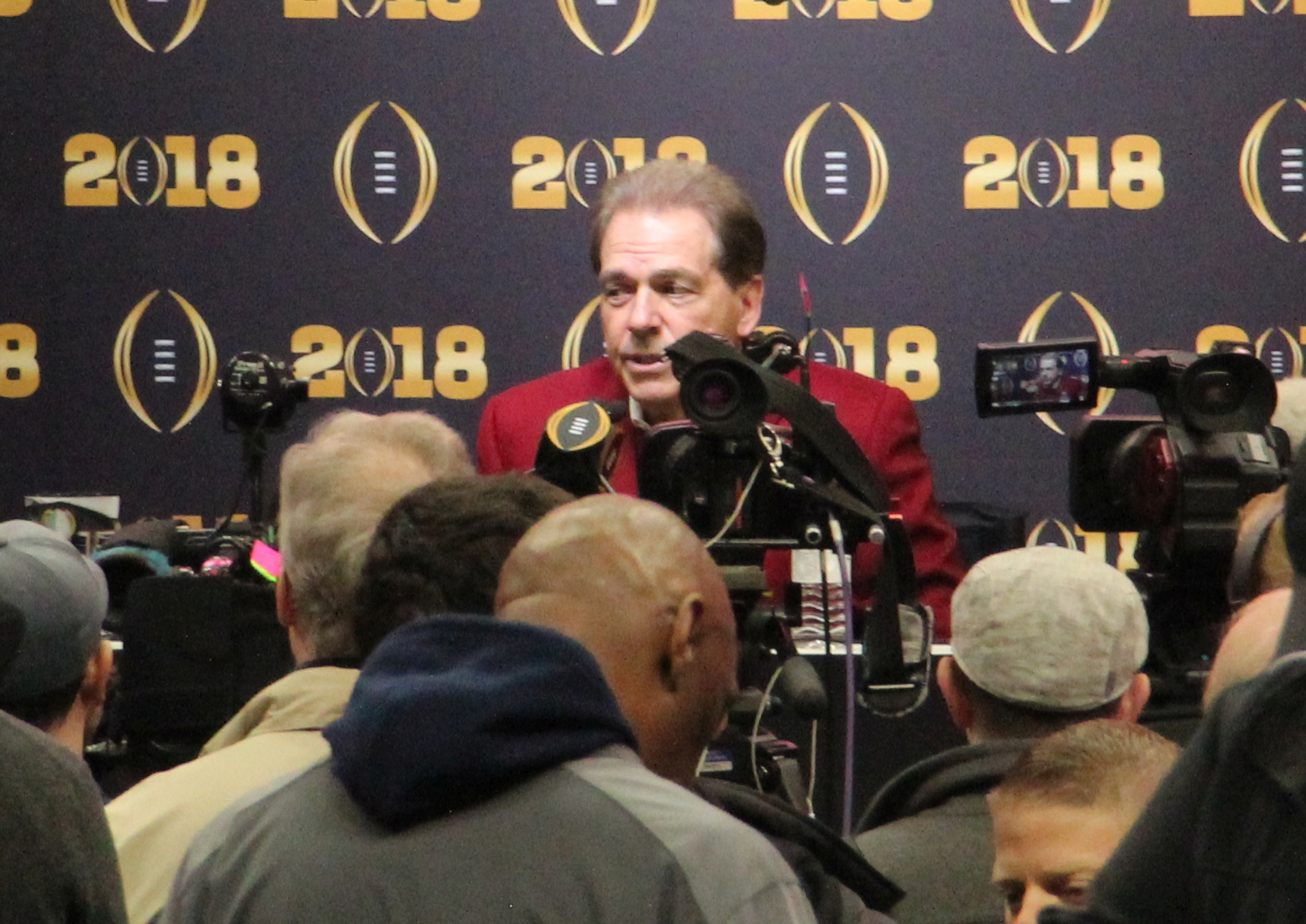
Saban speaking to the media ahead of the 2018 National Championship

In Saban's 11th season, Alabama started the season #1 in both the AP and Coaches Poll for the second consecutive year. This was the tenth season in a row that Alabama was #1 at some point during the season and fourth time to start the season under Saban. In the Chick-fil-A Kickoff Game in a matchup of top-three teams, Alabama beat #3 Florida State 24–7. Alabama improved to 5–0 in Chick-fil-A games and Saban improved to 11–0 against former assistant coaches. In the home opener, the Tide defeated Fresno State 41–10. The next week Alabama defeated Colorado State 41–23. In the conference opener, the Tide dominated Vanderbilt 59–0.

The following week, Alabama manhandled Ole Miss 66–3, the most points in a game since 1979. The next week, Alabama went on the road and defeated Texas A&M 27–19. The next week, the Tide defeated Arkansas 41–9 for the 11th win in a row in the series. In the annual Third Saturday in October, the Tide defeated Tennessee 45–7. The win was the 11th consecutive victory over the Vols, tying the record set back from 1971 to 1981.

Following the bye week, Alabama won its seventh consecutive game over rival #19 LSU 24–10. Alabama then traveled to Starkville and escaped with a 31–24 win over #18 Mississippi State. The win secured Saban's tenth consecutive season with ten or more wins. On Senior Day, Alabama dominated FCS opponent Mercer 56–0. The win gave Saban's senior class its 51st win, tying the NCAA record. In the Iron Bowl, the Tide suffered its first loss of the season to in-state rival #6 Auburn 26–14. They finished the regular season 11–1.

On December 3, Alabama was selected to the College Football Playoff for the fourth consecutive year, becoming the first team to be selected for the playoffs after finishing second in the SEC Western division and not having a chance to play for an SEC Championship. They were chosen as the #4 seed and played the #1 seed Clemson Tigers at the Sugar Bowl. In the rematch of the previous two National Championship games, Alabama avenged the previous season's only loss, to Clemson, winning 24–6. The win gave Saban his first Sugar Bowl victory as Alabama's coach, ending a three-game losing streak in the bowl. The win secured Saban his third consecutive appearance in the College Football Playoff Championship Game. It also gave Saban's Senior class an NCAA-record 52nd win.

Alabama took on the #3 seed Georgia Bulldogs in the second National Championship game between SEC schools. In overtime, backup quarterback Tua Tagovailoa threw the game-winning touchdown pass to DeVonta Smith on a 2nd-and-26 play for a 26–23 victory. This was Alabama's 17th National Championship and fifth title in nine seasons. Saban tied Bear Bryant with six national championships for most in the poll era. The Tide finished the season 13–1.

==== 2018 season ====
In this twelfth season, Alabama started the season ranked #1 in the AP and coaches poll for the third consecutive year. In the Camping World Kickoff in Orlando, Florida, the Tide defeated Louisville 51–14. In the home opener, the Tide dominated Arkansas State 57–7. In their conference opener against Ole Miss, the Crimson Tide won 62–7. The Tide defeated Jimbo Fisher and #22 Texas A&M 45–23. The following week, Alabama beat Louisiana 56–14. Alabama then went to Fayetteville and defeated Arkansas 65–31 for its 12th consecutive victory over the Hogs. On homecoming, the Tide defeated Missouri 39–10.

In the Third Saturday in October, Alabama defeated rival Tennessee 58–21. It was the longest winning streak against the Vols with 12 wins and most points scored against them. After the bye week, Alabama traveled to Baton Rouge to take on #4 LSU in a matchup between two top-four ranked teams. The Tide shutout the Tigers 29–0, securing its seventh straight division title. The win was Saban's eighth consecutive victory over LSU. The win gave Alabama their 900th win in program history. The Tide shutout #18 Mississippi State 24–0, the second consecutive shutout of a conference opponent for first time since 1980. The win secured Saban his 11th straight 10-win season.

The Tide defeated FCS opponent The Citadel 50–17. In the Iron Bowl, Alabama avenged the previous season's only loss, to rival Auburn, defeating the Tigers 52–21. The win secured Saban's fourth undefeated regular season. In the SEC Championship, Alabama, behind backup quarterback Jalen Hurts, overcame a 14-point deficit to defeat #4 Georgia 35–28. The win gave Alabama its 27th SEC Championship. It was Saban's eighth conference title, sixth with Alabama. The win gave Saban's senior class its 54th win, breaking the previous year's NCAA record for most wins. The following day, Alabama was selected for the College Football Playoff for the fifth year in a row. They were selected as the #1 seed for the third time and played the #4 seed Oklahoma at the Orange Bowl.

In the first meeting since the 2014 Sugar Bowl, the Tide ended a three-game losing streak to Oklahoma, winning 45–34. It was Alabama's first Orange Bowl win since 1966. The Tide advanced to the National Championship game for the fourth consecutive year and played the #2 seed Clemson Tigers. In the third title game in four years against Clemson, Saban suffered his worst loss at Alabama, losing 44–16. Saban fell to 2–2 in CFP championship games. The Tide finished the season 14–1.

==== 2019 season ====
To start Saban's thirteenth season, Alabama began the year ranked #2 in the AP and coaches poll. In the Chick-fil-A Kickoff Game, Alabama defeated Duke 42–3. In the home opener, the Tide rolled New Mexico State 62–10. In their conference opener, Alabama traveled to Columbia, SC and defeated South Carolina 47–23. In their next game, Alabama defeated Southern Miss 49–7. Alabama, back in conference play, defeated Ole Miss 59–31. The next day, Alabama moved to #1 in the AP and Coaches poll. It was the twelfth year in a row Alabama was ranked at the top spot at some point during a season. Following a bye week, Alabama traveled to College Station, TX and defeated #24 Texas A&M 47–28.

In the Third Saturday in October, the Tide picked up its 13th win a row over Tennessee 35–13. On homecoming, Alabama got its 13th consecutive win over Arkansas 48–7. After a second bye week, Alabama took on #2 LSU in a matchup of top-3 teams for the second consecutive year. LSU handed Saban his first loss of the season, 46–41, snapping an eight-game winning streak against the Tigers. It also snapped Alabama's 31-home-game winning streak. The next week, Alabama defeated Mississippi State 38–7. On Senior Day, the Tide dominated Western Carolina 66–3, securing Saban's 12th consecutive 10 win season.

In the Iron Bowl, Saban suffered his second loss of the season to rival #15 Auburn 48–45. It's the first time Saban has lost two games in the regular season since 2010 and didn't qualify for the College Football Playoff for the first time. Alabama finished the regular season at 10–2 and ranked thirteenth in the final College Football Playoff rankings. They were selected to face Jim Harbaugh and #14 Michigan in the Citrus Bowl. In the first meeting since 2012, The Tide won 35–16. The Tide finished the season 11–2.

==== 2020 season ====
In his 14th season, due to the COVID-19 pandemic in the United States, Alabama's season was cut to an all conference, ten-game season beginning on September 26. Alabama began the season ranked #3 in the AP and Coaches Poll. In the season opener, Alabama went on the road and defeated Missouri 38–19. In the home opener, Alabama defeated #13 Texas A&M 52–24. The following week Saban took on former assistant Lane Kiffin. In a shootout, Alabama defeated Ole Miss 63–48. The 111 points scored was the most in a non-overtime conference game in SEC history.

On October 14, 2020, Saban tested positive for COVID-19, along with the university athletic director, Greg Byrne. That Saturday, Saban tested negative and was able to coach Alabama in a top 3 matchup against #3 Georgia. The Tide prevailed 41–24 to improve to 22–0 versus former assistants. In the Third Saturday in October, Alabama won its 14th straight over rival Tennessee 48–17. The next week, the Tide shutout Mississippi State 41–0. Following the bye week, Alabama moved up to #1 in the polls. It's the thirteenth year in a row Alabama has reached the top spot during a season. After an extra week off due to COVID-19, Alabama returned to play defeating Kentucky 63–3. On November 25, Saban returned a positive COVID-19 test. He missed the following game against #22 Auburn in the Iron Bowl, which Alabama won 42–13. The next week, Saban was back on the sideline, as Alabama routed LSU 55–17. The win secured Alabama the SEC Western division title, its 15th overall and Saban's 12th as a coach.

Alabama finished the regular season undefeated after defeating Arkansas 52–3. It was Saban's fifth undefeated regular season at Alabama. It marks Alabama's 13th consecutive ten-win season as well. In the SEC Championship, Alabama hung on in a high scoring game against #7 Florida 52–46. The win secured Alabama its 28th SEC title and gave Saban his ninth overall. The following day, Alabama was selected for the College Football Playoff for the sixth time in seven years. Alabama was selected as the #1 seed and played the #4 seed Notre Dame in the Rose Bowl. In the first meeting since the 2013 BCS National Championship Game, the Tide defeated the Irish 31–14. It was Alabama's first appearance and win in the Rose Bowl since 1946.

On January 5, 2021, DeVonta Smith became Saban's third Heisman Trophy winner. Mac Jones and Najee Harris finished third and fifth respectively in voting. Alabama became the second program to have three players finish in the top five in Heisman voting, joining Army's 1946 team. In the 2021 College Football Playoff National Championship, Alabama defeated #3 Ohio State 52–24 to win its 18th National Championship. The win gave Saban his seventh overall National Title, and sixth with the Crimson Tide. Saban passed Paul W. Bryant for most titles all time. It was Saban's second undefeated season and first since 2009. The Tide finished the season 13–0.

==== 2021 season ====
On June 7, 2021, Saban agreed to a contract extension with Alabama. The deal runs through the 2028 season. In his 15th season, Alabama started the season #1 in the preseason AP and Coaches poll, marking the 14th consecutive season the Tide have had the #1 ranking. It's the sixth time Alabama has started the season No. 1 under Saban. In the Chick-fil-A Kickoff Game, Alabama defeated #14 Miami (FL) 44–13 in their first meeting since the 1993 Sugar Bowl. In the home opener, the Tide defeated Mercer 48–14. The following week, Alabama traveled to Gainesville to take on #11 Florida. In the conference opener, The Tide won a close game 31–29. The next week, Alabama defeated Southern Miss 63–14.

In the following game, Alabama took on #12 Ole Miss and won 42–21. Alabama traveled to College Station, Texas, to play Texas A&M in the next game. In a back and forth game, the Aggies kicked a last second 28-yard field goal to upset the Tide 41–38. The loss snapped a 19-game win streak, an eight-game win streak against the Aggies, and a 100-game win streak against unranked opponents dating back to 2007. The next week, Alabama bounced back defeating Mississippi State 49–9. In the Third Saturday in October, Alabama defeated Tennessee 52–24 for its 15th consecutive win in the series. Following the bye week, Alabama won a close game against LSU 20–14.

Alabama wrapped up non-conference play against New Mexico State winning 59–3. On Senior Day, Alabama won another close game over #21 Arkansas 42–35. The win secured Saban his eleventh SEC West title at Alabama. The win gave him his 14th consecutive 10-win season, tying Bobby Bowden for most all time. In the Iron Bowl, Alabama played Auburn in the first overtime game in the rivalry's history, winning 24–22 in four overtimes. The Tide finished the regular season 11–1. In the SEC Championship, Alabama took on #1 Georgia winning 41–24. The victory marked Saban's eighth SEC title with Alabama, and the Tide's 29th SEC championship. The following day, Alabama was selected to the College Football Playoff for the seventh time in eight seasons. They were chosen as the #1 seed and played the #4 seed Cincinnati in the first meeting between the schools since 1990.

On December 11, Bryce Young became Saban's fourth Heisman Trophy winner. The win ties him with Frank Leahy for most Heisman winners. In the Cotton Bowl Classic, Alabama defeated Cincinnati 27–6. The win secured Saban's ninth title game appearance in 13 seasons. The Tide played #3 Georgia in a rematch of the SEC Championship in the third All-SEC National title game. In the CFP National Championship, Saban suffered his third title game loss, losing 33–18. The Tide finished the season 13–2.

==== 2022 season ====
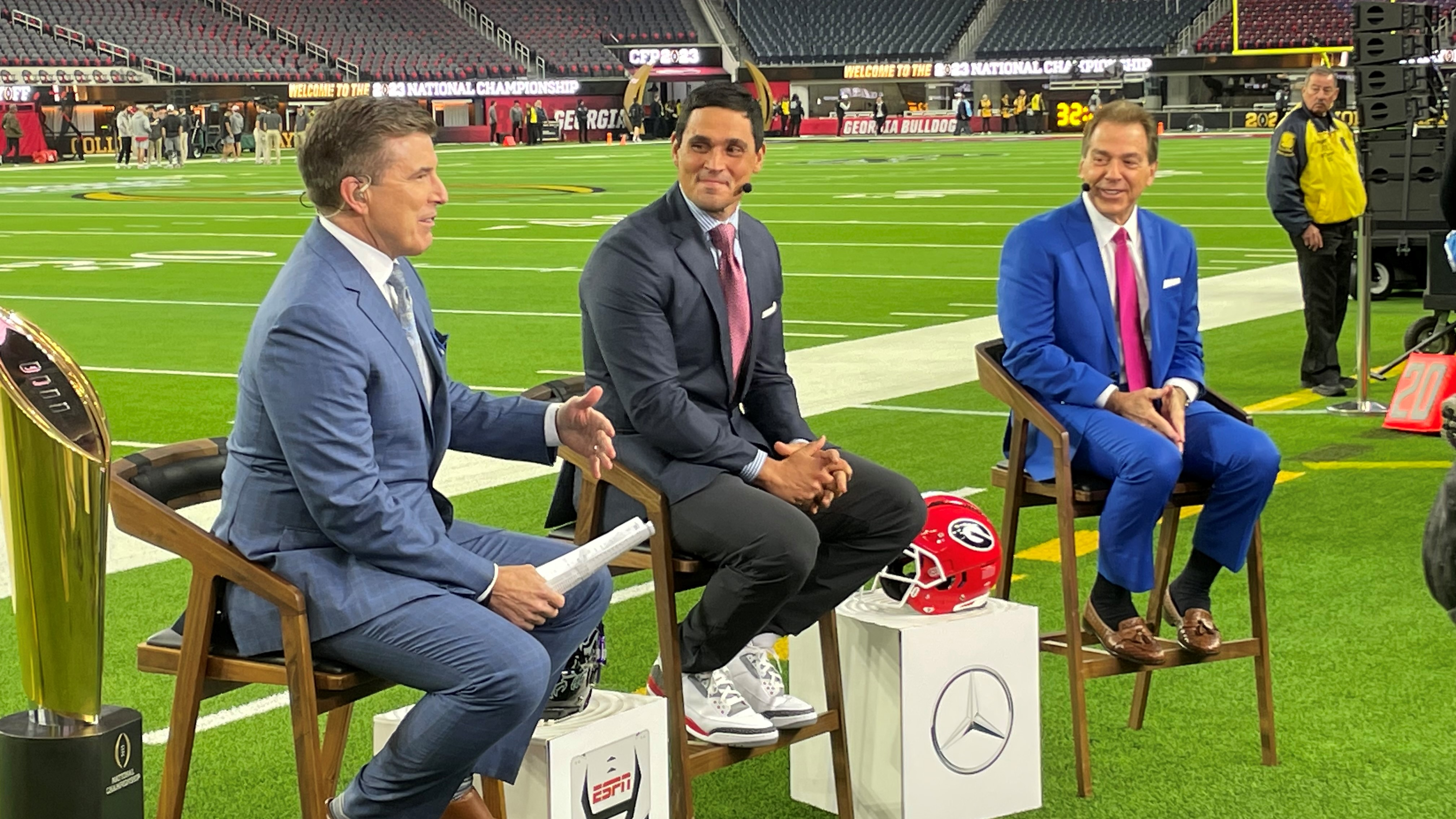
Saban giving pre-game analysis alongside ESPN's Rece Davis and David Pollack ahead of the 2023 College Football Playoff championship game

In his 16th season, Alabama started the year ranked #1 in the preseason AP and Coaches Poll. 2022 marked the 15th consecutive season the Tide have been #1 at some point of the year. In the season opener, Alabama shutout Utah State 55–0. Alabama traveled to Austin, Texas, for the first time since 1922 to play Texas. In the first meeting since the 2010 BCS National Championship Game, Alabama overcame a late deficit to win 20–19. The following week, Alabama defeated Louisiana Monroe 63–7. Alabama opened up conference play with a 55–3 win over Vanderbilt.

The next week, the Tide traveled to Fayetteville and defeated #20 Arkansas 49–26. In the following game, the Tide defeated Texas A&M 24–20, avenging last season's only regular season loss. In the Third Saturday in October, Saban suffered his first loss as Alabama coach against #6 Tennessee, losing 52–49 on a last second field goal at Neyland Stadium in Knoxville. The loss snapped Alabama's longest winning streak against the Vols at fifteen. On homecoming, the Tide bounced back defeating #24 Mississippi State 30–6.

Following a bye week, Alabama traveled to Baton Rouge in a top ten matchup against #10 LSU. Saban suffered his second loss of the season, losing 32–31 in overtime. Alabama bounced back with a close win over #11 Ole Miss 30–24. The next week, Alabama shutout Austin Peay 34–0. In the Iron Bowl, the Tide defeated Auburn 49–27. The win secured Saban his fifteenth consecutive ten-win season, a new NCAA record. Alabama finished the regular season 10-2 and was selected to play #9 Kansas State in the Sugar Bowl. In the first meeting between the two schools, Alabama won 45–20. The Tide finished the season 11–2.

==== 2023 season ====
In Saban's 17th season, Alabama started the year ranked #4 in the preseason AP poll and #3 in the coaches poll. In the season opener, Alabama defeated Middle Tennessee 56–7. The following week, the Tide hosted #11 Texas in the Allstate Crossbar Classic losing 34–24. The loss snapped a 57-game winning streak against non conference opponents in the regular season. The next week Alabama travelled to Tampa, FL to play South Florida. The Tide struggled but won 17–3. Alabama opened up conference play with a 24–10 win over #15 Ole Miss. The next week they defeated Mississippi State 40–17 for its sixteenth consecutive win in the series.

Alabama traveled to College Station, TX winning a close game over Texas A&M 26–20. On homecoming, Alabama won a close game over Arkansas 24–21. The win gave Saban his 200th on-field win at Alabama. In the Third Saturday in October, Alabama avenged last season's loss against #17 Tennessee winning 34–20. Following a bye week, Alabama avenged their other regular season loss from last season defeating #14 LSU 42–28. The next week Alabama defeated Kentucky 49–21 to win the SEC Western Division title. It is Saban's 15th overall division title and 13th with Alabama. On Senior Day, Alabama routed FCS opponent Chattanooga 66–10. The win gave Saban his sixteenth straight 10-win season.

In the Iron Bowl, quarterback Jalen Milroe on 4th and goal threw a 31-yard touchdown pass with 32 seconds left to defeat Auburn 27–24. The win made Saban the first Alabama coach since Bear Bryant in 1981 to defeat Auburn four years in a row. The Tide finished the regular season 11–1. In the SEC Championship, Alabama defeated #1 Georgia 27–24, snapping Georgia's 29 game win streak. The win secured Alabama its 30th SEC Championship. The win gave Saban his eleventh SEC title and ninth with Alabama. The following day, Alabama was selected for the College Football Playoff for the eighth time. They were selected as the #4 seed and would play the #1 seed Michigan in the Rose Bowl.

In the first meeting since the 2020 Citrus Bowl, Michigan defeated Alabama 27–20 in overtime. It was Saban's first playoff semifinal loss since 2014. The loss snapped a fifteen-year streak of being ranked #1 in the polls at any time during the season and marked the first time at Alabama that Saban went three consecutive seasons without winning a national championship. The Tide finished the season 12–2. Saban announced his retirement from coaching on January 10, 2024. Saban finished his coaching career at Alabama with a record of 201–29. In 2024, the University of Alabama named the field at Bryant-Denny Stadium after Saban. On September 7, the field officially became known as Saban Field at Bryant-Denny Stadium at a dedication. In June 2024, The Tuscaloosa News reported that Saban serves in an advisory role for Alabama's athletics program with an annual salary of $500,000 and also has an office at Bryant–Denny Stadium.

=== Record against conference opponents ===
In his time as a head coach, Saban recorded a 161–33 (.829) record in SEC Conference play.

The following are his records against each team:

- Alabama: 4–1
- Arkansas: 20–2
- Auburn: 14–8
- Florida:10–4
- Georgia: 10–3
- Kentucky: 9–0
- LSU: 13–6
- Mississippi State: 21–1
- Missouri: 4–0
- Ole Miss: 19–3
- South Carolina: 4–1
- Tennessee: 18–2
- Texas A&M: 10–2
- Vanderbilt: 5–0

== Broadcasting career ==
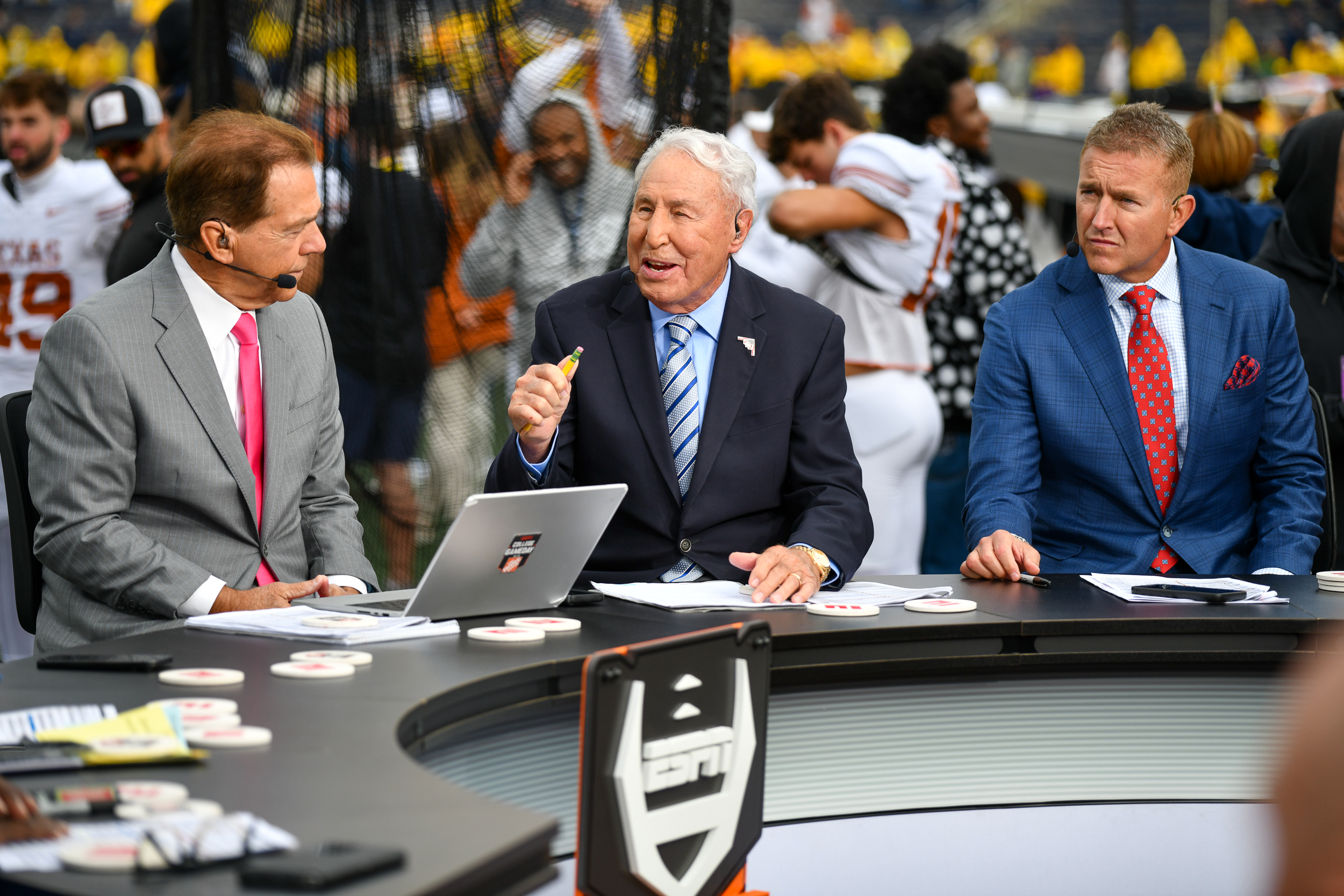
Saban (left) alongside Lee Corso (center) and Kirk Herbstreit (right) during a College GameDay broadcast in 2024.

Since 2023, Saban has appeared as a weekly guest on The Pat McAfee Show during the college football season. On February 7, 2024, Saban was hired by ESPN as an analyst for College GameDay, beginning with the 2024 college football season. The network announced that Saban would contribute to its NFL Draft and SEC Media Days coverage as well. Saban had appeared on the network previously as a guest analyst during College Football Playoff coverage.

Saban has appeared in various television commercials endorsing Regions Bank, AFLAC, Vrbo, and Home Depot.

== Business activities ==
Saban is co-owner of Dream Motor Group, a collection of 12 car dealerships across the South, in partnership with Joe Agresti and former Mercedes-Benz USA CEO Steve Cannon. Dealership franchises include Mercedes-Benz, Ferrari, Infiniti, Lexus, Nissan, and Toyota.

Through his partnership with Agresti and Cannon, Saban also co-owns Dream Beverage Group (makers of Slow Pass Bourbon), Dream Sports Ventures (minority owner of Nashville Predators NHL team), and Dream Hospitality Group (part owner of three hotel and resort properties).

== Personal life ==
Saban is a devout Catholic; he arranged for himself and his players who were Catholic to celebrate Mass before each game, usually with local clergy presiding over the brief services. The Sabans attend St. Francis of Assisi University Parish in Tuscaloosa. St. Francis' parish priest, Father Gerald Holloway, served as a chaplain for the football team before he was transferred.

Saban is of Croatian heritage. Bill Belichick and Saban are friends, having known each other since 1982. In 2019, when Saban spoke about their relationship, he said: "Sometimes people have a real true love and respect for someone. You really love to see them have this success and continue to have this success. I don't know how many people can really understand that kind of relationship. That's kind of how I feel about Bill."

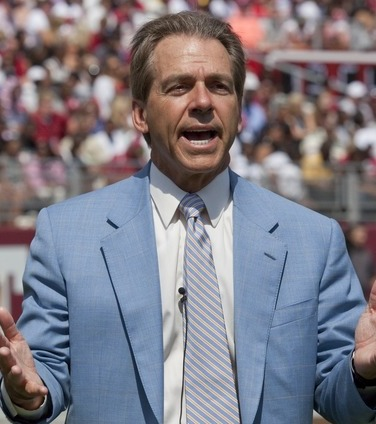
Saban in 2010

Saban shares his last name with another famous football coach, Lou Saban. They were called "distant cousins" in a 2005 article where Lou comments on the younger Saban's success. Upon the death of Lou Saban, his widow Joyce Saban said the two men might have been second cousins, but their families say they are not related.

Saban made a cameo appearance as himself in the 2009 film The Blind Side, and requested to simply repeat a conversation he had with Michael Oher rather than follow the script, which director John Lee Hancock allowed him to do. In August 2010, the documentary Nick Saban: Gamechanger was released. Included in the film are interviews from Belichick and Alabama athletic director Mal Moore, among others.

Saban and his wife Terry have been married for over 50 years. They have two adopted children: Nicholas and Kristen. The Sabans are the co-founders of the foundation Nick's Kids. This foundation has been used by the Sabans to help support children's needs ever since Saban started head coaching. In the first three years at Alabama, Nick's Kids raised more than US$1 million. Saban owns a vacation home on Lake Burton in northeast Georgia and purchased a beach house in Jupiter, Florida in 2023.

Outside of football, Saban keeps in touch with his players, taking a mentor role to his former players. Saban not only speaks with NFL players, but former athletes that have moved on past football, such as Eryk Anders, linebacker turned pro fighter in the Ultimate Fighting Championship. In 2022, Saban co-signed a letter directed at Senator Joe Manchin, voicing support for the passage of the Freedom to Vote Act, while including a footnote that he does not support the removal of the filibuster in the Senate. Saban and Manchin grew up together in West Virginia, and Saban had previously endorsed Manchin for Senate in 2018.

== Coaching tree ==
Saban is from the Don James coaching tree. After Saban finished his degree at Kent State in 1972, James convinced him to join the Kent State coaching staff as a graduate assistant. Saban's coaching career encompasses the Bill Belichick coaching tree, having worked as his defensive coordinator during Belichick's tenure as head coach of the Cleveland Browns. Saban worked with Belichick's father, Steve, while on the staff together at Navy in 1982.

=== First-time head coaches ===
The following coaches served as assistants or graduate assistants under Saban before receiving their first head coaching opportunity:

- L. C. Cole: Tennessee State (1996–1999), Alabama State (2000–2002), Stillman (2009–2010)
- Dean Pees: Kent State (1998–2003)
- Bobby Williams: Michigan State (2000–2002)
- Tom Amstutz: Toledo (2001–2008)
- Mark Dantonio: Cincinnati (2004–2006), Michigan State (2007–2019)
- Brad Salem: Augustana (SD) (2005–2009)
- Scott Linehan: St. Louis Rams (2006–2008)
- Derek Dooley: Louisiana Tech (2007–2009), Tennessee (2010–2012)
- Greg Colby: Millersville (2008–2012)
- Josh McDaniels: Denver Broncos (2009–2010), Las Vegas Raiders (2022–2023)
- Mike Haywood: Miami (OH) (2009–2010), Texas Southern (2016–2018)
- Jimbo Fisher: Florida State (2010–2017), Texas A&M (2018–2023)
- Jason Garrett: Dallas Cowboys (2011–2019)
- Curt Cignetti: IUP (2011–2016), Elon (2017–2018), James Madison (2019–2023), Indiana (2024–present)
- Pat Shurmur: Cleveland Browns (2011–2012), New York Giants (2018–2019)
- Will Muschamp: Florida (2011–2014), South Carolina (2016–2020)
- Jim McElwain: Colorado State (2012–2014), Florida (2015–2017), Central Michigan (2019–2024)
- Brian Polian: Nevada (2013–2016), John Carroll (2026–present)
- Jason Woodman: Fairmont State (2013–2023), Morehead State (2024–present)
- Dan Quinn: Atlanta Falcons (2015–2020), Washington Commanders (2024–present)
- Adam Gase: Miami Dolphins (2016–2018), New York Jets (2019–2020)
- Kirby Smart: Georgia (2016–present)
- Major Applewhite: Houston (2016–2018), South Alabama (2024–present)
- Geoff Collins: Temple (2017–2018), Georgia Tech (2019–2022)
- Jeremy Pruitt: Tennessee (2018–2020)
- Billy Napier: Louisiana (2018–2021), Florida (2022–2025), James Madison (2026–present)
- Mel Tucker: Colorado (2019), Michigan State (2020–2023)
- Freddie Kitchens: Cleveland Browns (2019)
- Joe Judge: New York Giants (2020–2021)
- Charles Huff: Marshall (2021–2024) Southern Miss (2025), Memphis (2026–present)
- Dan Lanning: Oregon (2022–present)
- Brian Daboll: New York Giants (2022–2025)
- Brent Key: Georgia Tech (2023–present)
- Lance Taylor: Western Michigan (2023–present)
- Jody Wright: Murray State (2024–present)
- Charles Kelly: Jacksonville State (2025–present)
- Scott Cochran: West Alabama (2025–present)
- Pete Golding: Ole Miss (2026–present)
- Alex Mortensen: UAB (2026–present)
- Tosh Lupoi: California (2026–present)

=== Veteran associates ===
The following coaches had previously served as head coaches at the collegiate or professional level before joining Saban's staff:

- Mike Mularkey: Jacksonville Jaguars (2012), Tennessee Titans (2016–2017)
- Mario Cristobal: Oregon (2017–2021), Miami (2022–present)
- Lane Kiffin: FAU (2017–2019), Ole Miss (2020–2025), LSU (2026–Present)
- Mike Locksley: Maryland (2019–2026)
- Steve Sarkisian: Texas (2021–present)
- Butch Jones: Arkansas State (2021–present)
- Bill O'Brien: Boston College (2024–present)
- Ron Cooper: LIU (2022–present)

=== Players ===
The following coaches were former players under Saban that later became head coaches:

- Herb Haygood: Madonna (2020–2023)
- Matt Eberflus: Chicago Bears (2022–2024)

== Head coaching record ==
=== College ===
Year	Team	Overall	Conference	Standing	Bowl/playoffs	Coaches^{#}	AP^{°}
Toledo Rockets (Mid-American Conference) (1990)
1990	Toledo	9–2	7–1	T–1st			
Toledo:		9–2	7–1				
Michigan State Spartans (Big Ten Conference) (1995–1999)
1995	Michigan State	6–5–1	4–3–1	5th	L Independence		
1996	Michigan State	6–6	5–3	5th	L Sun		
1997	Michigan State	7–5	4–4	6th	L Aloha		
1998	Michigan State	6–6	4–4	6th			
1999	Michigan State	9–2 (Note: Saban resigned as head coach at Michigan State following the end of the 1999 regular season. Bobby Williams succeeded Saban as head coach and led the Spartans to a victory in the Florida Citrus Bowl. Michigan State finished the season with an overall record of 10–2 and ranked seventh in both the AP Poll and the Coaches Poll.)	6–2	T–2nd	Florida Citrus	9	9
Michigan State:		34–24–1	23–16–1				
LSU Tigers (Southeastern Conference) (2000–2004)
2000	LSU	8–4	5–3	2nd (Western)	W Peach		22
2001	LSU	10–3	5–3	T–1st (Western)	W Sugar^{†}	8	7
2002	LSU	8–5	5–3	T–2nd (Western) (Note: In 2002, Alabama finished first in Western Division of the Southeastern Conference (SEC) with a conference record of 6–2, but was ineligible for the division title or postseason play as part of a penalty for National Collegiate Athletic Association (NCAA) violations. LSU, Arkansas, and Auburn tied for second place, each with a 5–3 mark in the conference, and were named co-champions. Arkansas was awarded a berth in the SEC Championship Game by virtue of their head-to-head wins over Auburn and LSU.)	L Cotton		
2003	LSU	13–1	7–1	T–1st (Western)	W Sugar^{†}	1	2
2004	LSU	9–3	6–2	2nd (Western)	L Capital One	16	16
LSU:		48–16	28–12				
Alabama Crimson Tide (Southeastern Conference) (2007–2023)
2007	Alabama	2–6	1–4	T–3rd (Western)	W Independence		
2008	Alabama	12–2	8–0	1st (Western)	L Sugar^{†}	6	6
2009	Alabama	14–0	8–0	1st (Western)	W BCS NCG^{†}	1	1
2010	Alabama	10–3	5–3	4th (Western)	W Capital One	11	10
2011	Alabama	12–1	7–1	2nd (Western)	W BCS NCG^{†}	1	1
2012	Alabama	13–1	7–1	1st (Western)	W BCS NCG^{†}	1	1
2013	Alabama	11–2	7–1	T–1st (Western)	L Sugar^{†}	8	7
2014	Alabama	12–2	7–1	1st (Western)	L Sugar^{†}	4	4
2015	Alabama	14–1	7–1	1st (Western)	W Cotton^{†}, W CFP NCG^{†}	1	1
2016	Alabama	14–1	8–0	1st (Western)	W Peach^{†}, L CFP NCG^{†}	2	2
2017	Alabama	13–1	7–1	T–1st (Western)	W Sugar^{†}, W CFP NCG^{†}	1	1
2018	Alabama	14–1	8–0	1st (Western)	W Orange^{†}, L CFP NCG^{†}	2	2
2019	Alabama	11–2	6–2	2nd (Western)	W Citrus	8	8
2020	Alabama	13–0	10–0	1st (Western)	W Rose^{†}, W CFP NCG^{†}	1	1
2021	Alabama	13–2	7–1	1st (Western)	W Cotton^{†}, L CFP NCG^{†}	2	2
2022	Alabama	11–2	6–2	T–1st (Western)	W Sugar^{†}	5	5
2023	Alabama	12–2	8–0	1st (Western)	L Rose^{†}	5	5
Alabama:		201–29	117–18				
Total:		292–71–1					
National championship Conference title Conference division title or championship game berth
^{†}Indicates BCS or CFP / New Years' Six bowl.; ^{#}Rankings from final Coaches Poll.; ^{°}Rankings from final AP Poll.

=== NFL ===
Team	Year	Regular season					Postseason			
Team	Year	Won	Lost	Ties	Win %	Finish	Won	Lost	Win %	Result
MIA	2005	9	7	0	.563	2nd in AFC East	–	–	–	–
MIA	2006	6	10	0	.375	4th in AFC East	–	–	–	–
MIA total		15	17	0	.469		–	–	–	
Total		15	17	0	.469					

== See also ==
- List of college football career coaching winning percentage leaders
- List of college football career coaching wins leaders
