= 1997 Aloha Bowl =

American college football game

Washington Huskies	Michigan State Spartans
(7-4)	(7-4)
51	23
Head coach: Jim Lambright	Head coach: Nick Saban
AP / Coaches / BA; 21 / 23 / 21	AP / Coaches / BA; 25 / 25 / 25
	1	2	3	4	Total
Washington	14	17	13	7	51
Michigan State	7	3	7	6	23
- Date: December 25, 1997
- Season: 1997
- Stadium: Aloha Stadium
- Location: Honolulu, Hawaii
- MVP: Rashaan Shehee
- National anthem: 1st Grade
- Halftime show: School marching bands
- Attendance: 34,419

United States TV coverage
- Network: ABC
- Announcers: Brent Musburger, Dan Fouts and Jack Arute

The 1997 Aloha Bowl was a college football bowl game played December 25, 1997, in Honolulu, Hawaii. It was part of the 1997 NCAA Division I-A football season. It featured the Washington Huskies of the Pac-10 and the Michigan State Spartans of the Big Ten. It was a matchup of top 25 teams.

Washington got off to a strong start quickly, capitalizing on a 33-yard touchdown run from running back Rashaan Shehee to take a 7–0 lead with just 1 minute elapsed. Shehee would finish the game with 195 rushing yards and two touchdowns. Just 5 minutes later, Washington quarterback Brock Huard threw a 15-yard touchdown pass to Fred Coleman as the Huskies built a 14–0 lead.

Michigan State finally broke onto the scoreboard after Todd Schultz threw a 12-yard touchdown pass to Gari Scott, and Michigan State trailed 14-7 after the 1st quarter. 44 seconds into the second quarter, Washington struck again, with another touchdown pass from Huard to Coleman gave the Huskies a 21–7 lead.

A 41-yard field goal from Nick Lentz increased Washington's lead to 24–7. With 2 minutes left in the 1st half, Michigan State's Paul Edinger kicked a 43-yard field goal making the score 24–10 Huskies. Michigan State would get the ball back again, but Tony Parrish returned a Michigan State interception 56 yards for a touchdown, as Washington built a 31–10 lead at halftime.

In the third, Shehee scored on a 15-yard touchdown run, his second of the game, and Washington held a commanding 38–10 lead. Michigan State answered quickly when Schultz found Gari Scott for a 28-yard touchdown pass making it 38–17. Washington put the game away, with a 64-yard touchdown run from Mike Reed giving the Huskies a 44–17 lead.

In the fourth quarter, Lester Towns returned another Michigan State interception 66 yards for a touchdown, making it 51–17. With just 2 seconds left in the game, Michigan State scored a meaningless touchdown on a 21-yard pass from Bill Burke to LaVaile Richardson. The ensuing extra point missed, and Washington won by a 51–23 final.

== Statistics ==
Statistics	Michigan State	Washington
First downs	15	23
Rushing yards	47	298
Passing yards	296	179
Total yards	343	477
Passes (att-comp-int)	35–20–3	30–18–0
Punts–average	3–30.0	6–39.8
Fumbles–lost	6–2	2–1
Penalties–yards	4–28	13–126
