= Bobby Myers (American football) =

American football player (born 1976)

No. 32
- Position: Safety

Personal information
- Born: November 10, 1976 (age 49); New Haven, Connecticut, U.S.
- Listed height: 6 ft 1 in (1.85 m)
- Listed weight: 196 lb (89 kg)

Career information
- High school: Hamden (CT)
- College: Wisconsin
- NFL draft: 2000: 4th round, 124th overall pick

Career history
- Tennessee Titans (2000–2002)

Career NFL statistics
- Games played: 17
- Games started: 2
- Fumble recoveries: 1
- Stats at Pro Football Reference

Bobby Jermaine Myers (born November 10, 1976) is an American former professional football player who was a safety in the National Football League (NFL). He played college football for the Wisconsin Badgers and was selected by the Tennessee Titans in the fourth round of the 2000 NFL draft. His post-NFL accomplishments include winning the MSCR flag football championship.
