= Roger Knight (American football) =

American football player (born 1978)

No. 53
- Position: Linebacker

Personal information
- Born: October 11, 1978 (age 48); Queens, New York, U.S.
- Listed height: 6 ft 0 in (1.83 m)
- Listed weight: 245 lb (111 kg)

Career information
- College: Wisconsin
- NFL draft: 2001: 6th round, 182nd overall pick

Career history
- Pittsburgh Steelers (2001)*; New Orleans Saints (2001–2004)
- * Offseason or practice squad member only

Career NFL statistics
- Tackles: 64
- Forced fumbles: 1
- Fumble recoveries: 1
- Stats at Pro Football Reference

Roger Oliver Knight (born October 11, 1978) is an American former professional football player who was a linebacker in the National Football League (NFL). He would attend Brooklyn Technical High School, graduating in 1997. He was selected by the Pittsburgh Steelers in the sixth round of the 2001 NFL draft. He played college football for the Wisconsin Badgers.

Knight also played for the New Orleans Saints.
