= Jason Doering =

American football player (born 1978)

No. 34, 35
- Position: Defensive back

Personal information
- Born: April 22, 1978 (age 48); Rhinelander, Wisconsin, U.S.
- Listed height: 6 ft 0 in (1.83 m)
- Listed weight: 201 lb (91 kg)

Career information
- High school: Rhinelander
- College: Wisconsin (1998–2000)
- NFL draft: 2001: 6th round, 193rd overall pick

Career history
- Indianapolis Colts (2001–2003); New York Giants (2004)*; Washington Redskins (2004)
- * Offseason or practice squad member only

Career NFL statistics
- Tackles: 106
- Fumble recoveries: 1
- Stats at Pro Football Reference

Jason James Doering (born April 22, 1978) is an American former professional football player who was a defensive back in the National Football League (NFL) for the Indianapolis Colts and Washington Redskins. He played college football for the Wisconsin Badgers and was selected in the sixth round of the 2001 NFL draft.
