= Gari Scott =

American football player (born 1978)

No. 16, 86
- Position: Wide receiver

Personal information
- Born: June 2, 1978 (age 48); West Palm Beach, Florida, U.S.
- Listed height: 6 ft 0 in (1.83 m)
- Listed weight: 190 lb (86 kg)

Career information
- High school: Suncoast (Riviera Beach, Florida)
- College: Michigan State
- NFL draft: 2000: 4th round, 99th overall pick

Career history
- Philadelphia Eagles (2000–2001); Green Bay Packers (2003)*; Washington Redskins (2004–2005)*
- * Offseason or practice squad member only

Career NFL statistics
- Receptions: 2
- Receiving yards: 26
- Stats at Pro Football Reference

Gari Jermaine Scott (born June 2, 1978) is an American former professional football player who was a wide receiver in the National Football League (NFL). He was selected by the Philadelphia Eagles in the fourth round of the 2000 NFL draft after playing college football for the Michigan State Spartans.

Despite largely playing in the shadow of teammate Plaxico Burress, Gari finished his Michigan State career with 134 catches for 2,095 yards and 18 TD. In 1998, he set career highs with 58 catches and 843 yards.

Scott played only one season with the Eagles. During that season, he played in three games and had two receptions for 26 yards.
