= Purdue Boilermakers football statistical leaders =

Statistical leaders of the Purdue Boilermakers football program

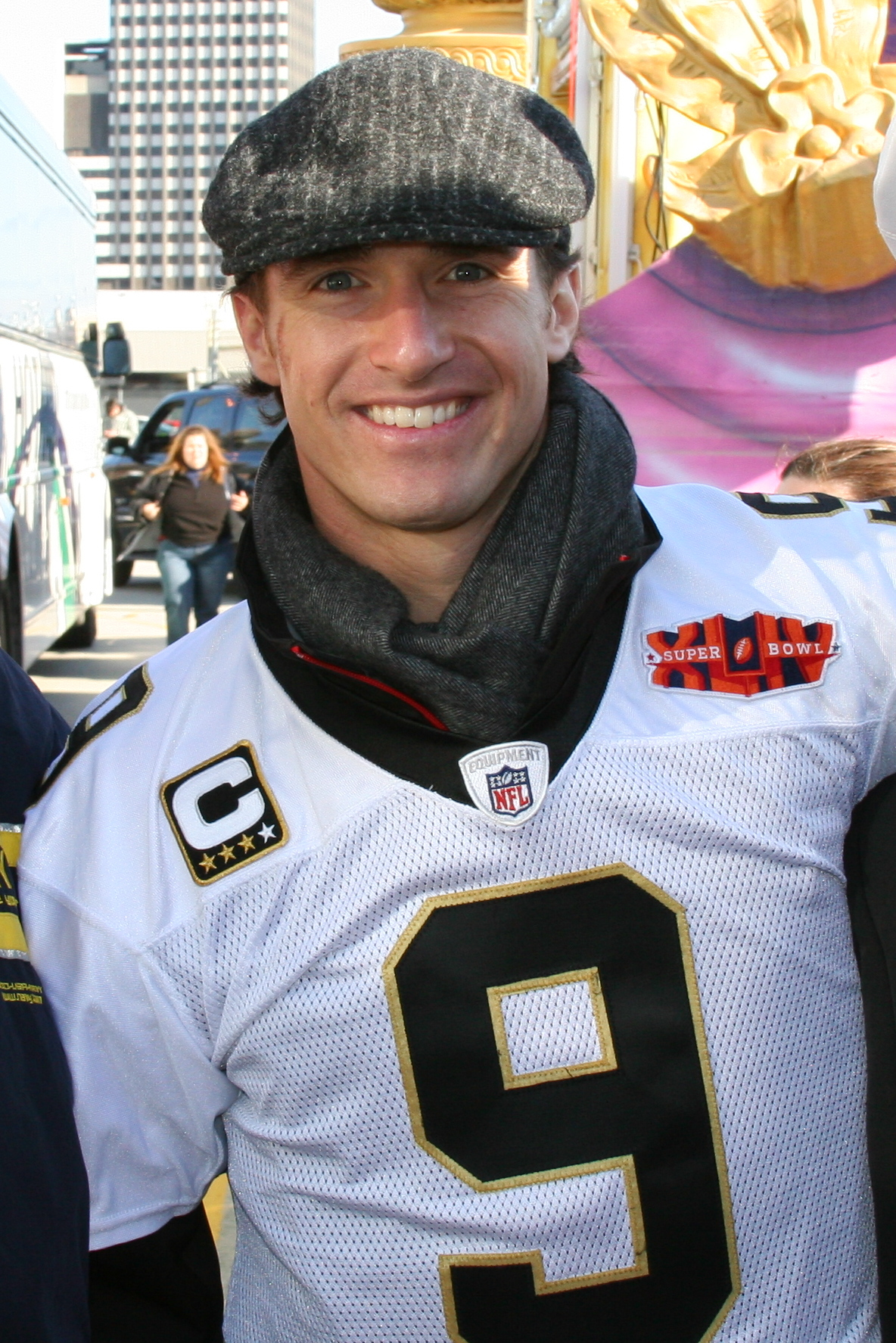
Drew Brees holds Purdue's career passing and total offense records.

The Purdue Boilermakers football statistical leaders are individual statistical leaders of the Purdue Boilermakers football program in various categories, including passing, rushing, receiving, total offense, defensive stats, and kicking. Within those areas, the lists identify single-game, single-season, and career leaders. The Boilermakers represent Purdue University in the NCAA's Big Ten Conference.

Although Purdue began competing in intercollegiate football in 1887, the school's official record book considers the "modern era" to have begun in 1946. Records from before this year are often incomplete and inconsistent, and they are generally not included in these lists.

These lists are dominated by more recent players for several reasons:

- Since 1946, seasons have increased from 10 games to 11 and then 12 games in length.
- The NCAA didn't allow freshmen to play varsity football until 1972 (with the exception of the World War II years), allowing players to have four-year careers.
- Bowl games only began counting toward single-season and career statistics in 2002.
- Due to COVID-19 disruptions, the NCAA ruled that the 2020 season would not be counted against any football player's athletic eligibility, giving players active in that season five years of eligibility instead of the standard four.

These lists are updated through the 2025 season.

== Passing ==
=== Passing yards ===
Career
Rank	Player	Yards	Years
1	Drew Brees	11,792	1997 1998 1999 2000
2	Curtis Painter	11,163	2005 2006 2007 2008
3	Mark Herrmann	9,946	1977 1978 1979 1980
4	David Blough	9,734	2015 2016 2017 2018
5	Kyle Orton	9,337	2001 2002 2003 2004
6	Aidan O'Connell	9,219	2019 2020 2021 2022
7	Scott Campbell	7,636	1980 1981 1982 1983
8	Jim Everett	7,411	1981 1982 1983 1984 1985
9	Eric Hunter	5,598	1989 1990 1991 1992
10	Mike Phipps	5,423	1967 1968 1969

Single season
Rank	Player	Yards	Year
1	Curtis Painter	3,985	2006
2	Drew Brees	3,983	1998
3	Drew Brees	3,909	1999
4	Curtis Painter	3,846	2007
5	Aidan O'Connell	3,712	2021
6	David Blough	3,705	2018
7	Drew Brees	3,668	2000
8	Jim Everett	3,651	1985
9	Aidan O'Connell	3,490	2022
10	David Blough	3,352	2016

Single game
Rank	Player	Yards	Year	Opponent
1	David Blough	572	2018	Missouri
2	Curtis Painter	546	2007	Central Michigan (Motor City Bowl)
3	Aidan O'Connell	536	2021	Michigan State
4	Aidan O'Connell	534	2021	Tennessee
5	Drew Brees	522	1998	Minnesota
5	Kyle Orton	522	2004	Indiana
7	Scott Campbell	516	1981	Ohio State
8	Drew Brees	509	1999	Michigan State
	Elijah Sindelar	509	2019	Vanderbilt
10	Jim Everett	497	1985	Ohio State

=== Passing touchdowns ===
Career
Rank	Player	TDs	Years
1	Drew Brees	90	1997 1998 1999 2000
2	Mark Herrmann	71	1977 1978 1979 1980
3	David Blough	69	2015 2016 2017 2018
4	Curtis Painter	67	2005 2006 2007 2008
5	Aidan O'Connell	65	2019 2020 2021 2022
6	Kyle Orton	63	2001 2002 2003 2004
7	Scott Campbell	45	1980 1981 1982 1983
8	Jim Everett	43	1981 1982 1983 1984 1985
9	Mike Phipps	37	1967 1968 1969
10	Eric Hunter	33	1989 1990 1991 1992

Single season
Rank	Player	TDs	Year
1	Drew Brees	39	1998
2	Kyle Orton	31	2004
3	Curtis Painter	29	2007
4	Aidan O'Connell	28	2021
5	Drew Brees	26	2000
6	Drew Brees	25	1999
	David Blough	25	2016
	David Blough	25	2018
9	Mike Phipps	23	1969
	Mark Herrmann	23	1980
	Jim Everett	23	1985

Single game
Rank	Player	TDs	Year	Opponent
1	Drew Brees	6	1998	Minnesota
	Drew Brees	6	1998	Northwestern
	Kyle Orton	6	2004	Indiana
	Curtis Painter	6	2007	Eastern Illinois
5	Mike Phipps	5	1969	Stanford
	Mark Herrmann	5	1977	Iowa
	Billy Dicken	5	1997	Minnesota
	Drew Brees	5	1999	Michigan State
	Drew Brees	5	2000	Northwestern
	Kyle Orton	5	2004	Ball State
	Curtis Painter	5	2008	Indiana
	David Blough	5	2016	Iowa
	Elijah Sindelar	5	2019	Vanderbilt
	Aidan O'Connell	5	2021	Tennessee

== Rushing ==
=== Rushing yards ===
Career
Rank	Player	Yards	Years
1	Mike Alstott	3,635	1992 1993 1994 1995
2	Kory Sheets	3,341	2005 2006 2007 2008
3	Otis Armstrong	3,315	1970 1971 1972
4	Devin Mockobee	2,983	2022 2023 2024 2025
5	Scott Dierking	2,863	1973 1974 1975 1976
6	Montrell Lowe	2,648	1999 2000 2001 2002
7	Markell Jones	2,594	2015 2016 2017 2018
8	Edwin Watson	2,520	1994 1995 1996 1997
9	Harry Szulborski	2,478	1946 1947 1948 1949
10	Corey Rogers	2,436	1991 1993 1994 1995

Single season
Rank	Player	Yards	Year
1	Mike Alstott	1,436	1995
2	Otis Armstrong	1,361	1972
3	Mike Alstott	1,188	1994
4	Kory Sheets	1,131	2008
5	Joey Harris	1,115	2002
6	Otis Armstrong	1,009	1970
7	Leroy Keyes	1,003	1968
8	Scott Dierking	1,000	1976
9	Montrell Lowe	998	2000
10	Harry Szulborski	989	1948

Single game
Rank	Player	Yards	Year	Opponent
1	Otis Armstrong	276	1972	Indiana
2	Mike Alstott	264	1995	Indiana
3	Ralph Bolden	234	2009	Toledo
4	Otis Armstrong	233	1972	Northwestern
5	Edwin Watson	227	1996	NC State
6	Leroy Keyes	225	1967	Illinois
7	Markell Jones	217	2017	Indiana
8	Leroy Keyes	214	1968	Wake Forest
9	Gary Danielson	213	1972	Washington
10	Scott Dierking	211	1976	Miami (OH)

=== Rushing touchdowns ===
Career
Rank	Player	TDs	Years
1	Kory Sheets	48	2005 2006 2007 2008
2	Mike Alstott	39	1992 1993 1994 1995
3	Jerod Void	36	2002 2003 2004 2005
4	Perry Williams	30	1966 1967 1968
5	Leroy Keyes	29	1966 1967 1968
6	Corey Rogers	27	1991 1993 1994 1995
7	Scott Dierking	25	1973 1974 1975 1976
	Edwin Watson	25	1994 1995 1996 1997
9	Devin Mockobee	23	2022 2023 2024 2025
10	Markell Jones	20	2015 2016 2017 2018

Single season
Rank	Player	TDs	Year
1	Tony Butkovich	16	1943
	Kory Sheets	16	2008
3	Leroy Keyes	14	1968
	Mike Alstott	14	1994
5	Leroy Keyes	13	1967
	Jerod Void	13	2003
7	Mike Alstott	12	1993
8	7 times by 6 players	11	Most recent: Kory Sheets, 2007

Single game
Rank	Player	TDs	Year	Opponent
1	Mike Northington	5	1973	Iowa
2	Perry Williams	4	1966	SMU
	Leroy Keyes	4	1968	Indiana
	Mike Alstott	4	1993	Minnesota
	Mike Alstott	4	1994	Ball State
	Mike Alstott	4	1994	Minnesota
	Montrell Lowe	4	2000	Indiana
	Jerod Void	4	2003	Illinois
	Kory Sheets	4	2006	Miami (Ohio)

== Receiving ==
=== Receptions ===
Career
Rank	Player	Rec	Years
1	Taylor Stubblefield	325	2001 2002 2003 2004
2	Dorien Bryant	292	2004 2005 2006 2007
3	John Standeford	266	2000 2001 2002 2003
4	David Bell	232	2019 2020 2021
5	Tim Stratton	204	1998 1999 2000 2001
6	Greg Orton	203	2005 2006 2007 2008
7	Rodney Carter	181	1982 1983 1984 1985
8	Dave Young	180	1977 1978 1979 1980
9	Rondale Moore	178	2018 2019 2020
10	Vinny Sutherland	176	1997 1998 1999 2000

Single season
Rank	Player	Rec	Year
1	Chris Daniels	121	1999
2	Rondale Moore	114	2018
3	Charlie Jones	110	2022
4	Rodney Carter	98	1985
5	David Bell	93	2021
6	Keith Smith	91	2009
7	Taylor Stubblefield	89	2004
8	Dorien Bryant	87	2006
	Dorien Bryant	87	2007
10	Taylor Stubblefield	86	2003
	David Bell	86	2019

Single game
Rank	Player	Rec	Year	Opponent
1	Chris Daniels	21	1999	Michigan State
2	Randall Lane	18	1998	Wisconsin
3	Taylor Stubblefield	16	2003	Bowling Green
	Taylor Stubblefield	16	2003	Wisconsin
	Dorien Bryant	16	2005	Northwestern

=== Receiving yards ===
Career
Rank	Player	Yards	Years
1	John Standeford	3,788	2000 2001 2002 2003
2	Taylor Stubblefield	3,629	2001 2002 2003 2004
3	Dorien Bryant	3,548	2004 2005 2006 2007
4	Brian Alford	3,029	1994 1995 1996 1997
5	David Bell	2,946	2019 2020 2021
6	Vinny Sutherland	2,370	1997 1998 1999 2000
7	Greg Orton	2,356	2005 2006 2007 2008
8	DeAngelo Yancey	2,344	2013 2014 2015 2016
9	Dave Young	2,316	1977 1978 1979 1980
10	Steve Griffin	2,234	1982 1983 1984 1985

Single season
Rank	Player	Yards	Year
1	Charlie Jones	1,361	2022
2	John Standeford	1,307	2002
3	David Bell	1,286	2021
4	Rondale Moore	1,258	2018
5	Chris Daniels	1,236	1999
6	Brian Alford	1,228	1997
7	John Standeford	1,150	2003
8	Keith Smith	1,100	2009
9	Rodney Carter	1,099	1985
10	Taylor Stubblefield	1,095	2004

Single game
Rank	Player	Yards	Year	Opponent
1	Chris Daniels	301	1999	Michigan State
2	David Bell	240	2021	Iowa
3	Selwyn Lymon	238	2006	Notre Dame
4	Rondale Moore	220	2019	Vanderbilt
5	David Bell	217	2021	Michigan State
	Broc Thompson	217	2021	Tennessee (Music City Bowl)
7	Brian Alford	215	1997	Minnesota
8	Milton Wright	213	2021	Northwestern
9	Brian Alford	209	1997	Toledo
	Kyle Ingraham	209	2004	Indiana

=== Receiving touchdowns ===
Career
Rank	Player	TDs	Years
1	Brian Alford	31	1994 1995 1996 1997
2	Dave Young	27	1977 1978 1979 1980
	John Standeford	27	2000 2001 2002 2003
4	Vinny Sutherland	25	1997 1998 1999 2000
5	Taylor Stubblefield	21	2001 2002 2003 2004
	Dorien Bryant	21	2004 2005 2006 2007
	David Bell	21	2019 2020 2021
	Payne Durham	21	2019 2020 2021 2022
9	DeAngelo Yancey	20	2013 2014 2015 2016
10	Jim Beirne	17	1965 1966 1967
	Calvin Williams	17	1986 1987 1988 1989

Single season
Rank	Player	TDs	Year
1	Taylor Stubblefield	16	2004
2	Vinny Sutherland	13	2000
	John Standeford	13	2002
4	Brian Alford	12	1996
	Rondale Moore	12	2018
	Charlie Jones	12	2022
7	Ashley Bell	11	1969
	Steve Bryant	11	1981
9	Dave Young	10	1979
	Brian Alford	10	1997
	DeAngelo Yancey	10	2016

Single game
Rank	Player	TDs	Year	Opponent
1	Reggie Arnold	4	1977	Iowa
2	16 times by 14 players	3	Most recent: Charlie Jones, 2022 vs. Indiana State	

== Total offense ==
Total offense is the sum of passing and rushing statistics. It does not include receiving or returns.

=== Total offense yards ===
Career
Rank	Player	Yards	Years
1	Drew Brees	12,692	1997 1998 1999 2000
2	Curtis Painter	11,511	2005 2006 2007 2008
3	David Blough	9,996	2015 2016 2017 2018
4	Kyle Orton	9,653	2001 2002 2003 2004
5	Mark Herrmann	9,134	1977 1978 1979 1980
6	Aidan O'Connell	8,945	2019 2020 2021 2022
7	Scott Campbell	7,526	1980 1981 1982 1983
8	Jim Everett	7,284	1981 1982 1983 1984 1985
9	Eric Hunter	5,984	1989 1990 1991 1992
10	Mike Phipps	5,883	1967 1968 1969

Single season
Rank	Player	Yards	Year
1	Drew Brees	4,189	2000
2	Drew Brees	4,176	1998
3	Curtis Painter	4,092	2006
4	Drew Brees	4,086	1999
5	Curtis Painter	3,826	2007
6	David Blough	3,757	2018
7	Aidan O'Connell	3,592	2021
8	Jim Everett	3,589	1985
9	Billy Dicken	3,487	1997
10	Aidan O'Connell	3,409	2022

Single game
Rank	Player	Yards	Year	Opponent
1	David Blough	590	2018	Missouri
2	Curtis Painter	540	2007	Central Michigan (Motor City Bowl)
3	Kyle Orton	530	2004	Indiana
4	Aidan O'Connell	525	2021	Tennessee
5	Drew Brees	524	1998	Minnesota
6	Aidan O'Connell	523	2021	Michigan State
7	Elijah Sindelar	519	2019	Vanderbilt
8	Drew Brees	501	1999	Michigan State
9	Drew Brees	497	2000	Minnesota

=== Touchdowns responsible for ===
In official NCAA records, "touchdowns responsible for" includes rushing and passing touchdowns, but not receptions or returns—the same statistical categories used to measure total offense.

Career
Rank	Player	TDs	Years
1	Drew Brees	104	1997 1998 1999 2000
2	David Blough	82	2015 2016 2017 2018
3	Curtis Painter	80	2005 2006 2007 2008
4	Mark Herrmann	73	1977 1978 1979 1980
5	Kyle Orton	69	2001 2002 2003 2004
6	Aidan O'Connell	67	2019 2020 2021 2022
7	Scott Campbell	51	1980 1981 1982 1983
8	Kory Sheets	48	2005 2006 2007 2008
9	Mike Phipps	46	1967 1968 1969
10	Jim Everett	46	1981 1982 1983 1984 1985

Single season
Rank	Player	TDs	Year
1	Drew Brees	42	1998
2	Kyle Orton	34	2004
3	Curtis Painter	32	2007
4	Mike Phipps	31	1969
	Drew Brees	31	2000
6	Drew Brees	29	1999
	David Blough	29	2016
	Aidan O'Connell	29	2021
9	Curtis Painter	28	2006
	David Blough	28	2018

Single game
Rank	Player	TDs	Year	Opponent
1	Drew Brees	6	1998	Minnesota
	Drew Brees	6	1998	Northwestern
	Kyle Orton	6	2004	Ball State
	Kyle Orton	6	2004	Indiana
	Curtis Painter	6	2007	Eastern Illinois
	Elijah Sindelar	6	2019	Vanderbilt

== Defense ==
=== Interceptions ===
Career
Rank	Player	Ints	Years
1	Stuart Schweigert	17	2000 2001 2002 2003
2	Ricardo Allen	13	2010 2011 2012 2013
	Cam Allen	13	2019 2020 2021 2022 2023
4	Bob Corby	11	1965 1966 1967
	Don Anderson	11	1981 1982 1983 1984
	Rod Woodson	11	1983 1984 1985 1986
	Marc Foster	11	1985 1986 1987 1988
	Jimmy Young	11	1990 1991 1992 1993
	Adrian Beasley	11	1996 1997 1998 1999
10	Bill Kay	10	1977 1978 1979 1980
	Landon Feichter	10	2011 2012 2013 2014
	Frankie Williams	10	2012 2013 2014 2015

Single season
Rank	Player	Ints	Year
1	Phil Mateja	7	1952
	Bill Kay	7	1979
3	Bob Corby	6	1967
	Marc Foster	6	1988
	Jimmy Young	6	1991
	Stuart Schweigert	6	2001
	Ricardo Allen	6	2013
	Dillon Thieneman	6	2023
9	14 times by 14 players	5	Most recent: Landon Feichter, 2014

Single game
Rank	Player	Ints	Year	Opponent
1	Paul Beery	4	1976	Wisconsin
2	Jack Brown	3	1939	Iowa
	Phil Mateja	3	1952	Notre Dame
	Ross Fichtner	3	1959	Minnesota
	Chuck Kyle	3	1968	Iowa
	Randy Cooper	3	1970	Stanford
	Tim Racke	3	1972	Indiana
	Bill Kay	3	1979	Michigan
	Jamel Coleman	3	1996	Penn State
	Mike Rose	3	1997	Northwestern
	Anthony Brown	3	2015	Nebraska

=== Tackles ===
Career
Rank	Player	Tackles	Years
1	Kevin Motts	520	1976 1977 1978 1979
2	Fred Strickland	479	1984 1985 1986 1987
3	Eric Beatty	448	1989 1990 1991 1992
4	Rod Woodson	445	1983 1984 1985 1986
5	Brock Spack	384	1980 1981 1982 1983
6	Jeff Zgonina	382	1989 1990 1991 1992
7	Kevin Sumlin	375	1983 1984 1985 1986
8	Jim Schwantz	363	1988 1989 1990 1991
9	Stuart Schweigert	360	2000 2001 2002 2003
10	Tony Visco	351	1984 1985 1986 1987

Single season
Rank	Player	Tackles	Year
1	Mark Brown	209	1982
2	Fred Arrington	182	1977
3	James Looney	180	1980
4	Eric Beatty	175	1992
5	Fred Strickland	168	1987
6	Kevin Motts	153	1977
7	Rick Schavietello	148	1971
	Kevin Motts	148	1978
9	Darrin Trieb	144	1989
10	Darrin Trieb	143	1988
	Jim Schwantz	143	1991

Single game
Rank	Player	Tackles	Year	Opponent
1	Chuck Kyle	27	1968	Indiana
2	Darrin Trieb	26	1990	Michigan
3	Rick Schavietello	23	1971	Washington
	Fred Arrington	23	1977	Indiana
	James Looney	23	1980	Michigan

=== Sacks ===
Career
Rank	Player	Sacks	Years
1	Rosevelt Colvin	35.0	1995 1996 1997 1998
2	Shaun Phillips	33.5	2000 2001 2002 2003
	Ryan Kerrigan	33.5	2007 2008 2009 2010
4	Jeff Zgonina	29.0	1989 1990 1991 1992
	Akin Ayodele	29.0	1999 2000 2001
6	Kydran Jenkins	23.5	2020 2021 2022 2023 2024
7	Anthony Spencer	21.0	2003 2004 2005 2006
8	Craig Terrill	20.5	2000 2001 2002 2003
9	Kawann Short	19.5	2009 2010 2011 2012
10	Jim Schwantz	18.0	1988 1989 1990 1991

Single season
Rank	Player	Sacks	Year
1	Rosevelt Colvin	15.0	1998
2	Shaun Phillips	14.5	2003
3	Rosevelt Colvin	14.0	1997
4	Jeff Zgonina	13.0	1992
	Ryan Kerrigan	13.0	2009
6	Ryan Kerrigan	12.5	2010
7	Jim Schwantz	11.0	1989
	Akin Ayodele	11.0	1999
9	Anthony Spencer	10.5	2006
10	Nic Scourton	10.0	2023

Single game
Rank	Player	Sacks	Year	Opponent
1	Tom Kingsbury	4.0	1980	Northwestern
	Rob Ninkovich	4.0	2004	Indiana
	Rob Ninkovich	4.0	2005	Indiana
	Ryan Kerrigan	4.0	2010	Michigan
5	Don Delvy	3.5	1992	Iowa
	Chike Okeafor	3.5	1998	Kansas State (Alamo Bowl)
	Shaun Phillips	3.5	2003	Wisconsin

== Kicking ==
=== Field goals made ===
Career
Rank	Player	FGs	Years
1	Travis Dorsch	68	1998 1999 2000 2001
2	Carson Wiggs	56	2008 2009 2010 2011
3	Ben Jones	43	2003 2004 2005
4	Mitchell Fineran	42	2021 2022
5	J. D. Dellinger	40	2016 2017 2018 2019 2020
6	Jonathan Briggs	36	1985 1986 1987
7	Chris Summers	31	2006 2007 2008 2009
	Paul Griggs	31	2012 2013 2014 2015
8	Scott Sovereen	27	1976 1977 1978
10	Spencer Evans	26	2017 2018

Single season
Rank	Player	FGs	Year
1	Ben Jones	25	2003
2	Mitchell Fineran	24	2021
3	Travis Dorsch	22	2001
4	Jacobo Echeverria Lozano	21	2026
5	Carson Wiggs	19	2011
6	Travis Dorsch	18	1999
	Chris Summers	18	2007
	Spencer Evans	18	2018
	Mitchell Fineran	18	2022
10	Rick Anderson	16	1980
	Travis Dorsch	16	1998
	Paul Griggs	16	2014

Single game
Rank	Player	FGs	Year	Opponent
1	Rick Anderson	5	1980	Michigan State
	Mitchell Fineran	5	2022	Michigan; Big Ten Championship
	Jacobo Echeverria Lozano	5	2026	Maryland
4	13 times by 8 players	4	Most recent: Mitchell Fineran, 2021 vs. Tennessee (Music City Bowl)	

=== Field goal percentage ===
Career (min. 15 attempts)
Rank	Player	FG%	Years
1	Jacobo Echeverria Lozano	91.3%	2026
2	Mitchell Fineran	79.2%	2021 2022
3	Spencer Porath	78.6%	2024 2025
4	Spencer Evans	74.3%	2017 2018
5	J. D. Dellinger	74.1%	2016 2017 2018 2019 2020
6	Carson Wiggs	73.7%	2008 2009 2010 2011
7	Travis Dorsch	70.1%	1998 1999 2000 2001
8	Ben Jones	69.4%	2003 2004 2005
9	Tim Clark	68.8%	1980 1981 1982 1983
10	Bob Griese	66.7%	1964 1965 1966

Single season (1 attempt per game)
Rank	Player	FG%	Year
1	Jacobo Echeverria Lozano	91.3%	2026
2	Spencer Porath	88.2%	2025
3	Ben Jones	83.3%	2003
4	Mitchell Fineran	82.8%	2021
5	Chris Summers	81.8%	2007
6	Travis Dorsch	81.5%	2001
7	J. D. Dellinger	81.3%	2019
8	Paul Griggs	80.0%	2014
9	Joe O'Leary	78.9%	1992
	Carson Wiggs	78.9%	2010
