= 2007 Purdue Boilermakers football team =

American college football season

2007 Purdue Boilermakers football

Motor City Bowl champion

Motor City Bowl, W 51–48 vs. Central Michigan
- Conference: Big Ten Conference
- Record: 8–5 (3–5 Big Ten)
- Head coach: Joe Tiller (11th season)
- Co-offensive coordinators: Bill Legg (2nd season); Ed Zaunbrecher (2nd season)
- Offensive scheme: One-back shotgun spread
- Defensive coordinator: Brock Spack (11th season)
- Base defense: 4–3
- MVP: Dustin Keller
- Captains: Cliff Avril; Dan Bick; Stanford Keglar; Curtis Painter
- Home stadium: Ross–Ade Stadium

2007 Big Ten Conference football standings
	Conf.			Overall
Team	W		L	W		L
No. 5 Ohio State $	7	–	1	11	–	2
No. 18 Michigan	6	–	2	9	–	4
No. 20 Illinois %	6	–	2	9	–	4
No. 24 Wisconsin	5	–	3	9	–	4
Penn State	4	–	4	9	–	4
Iowa	4	–	4	6	–	6
Purdue	3	–	5	8	–	5
Indiana	3	–	5	7	–	6
Michigan State	3	–	5	7	–	6
Northwestern	3	–	5	6	–	6
Minnesota	0	–	8	1	–	11
$ – BCS representative as conference champion; % – BCS at-large representative; Rankings from AP Poll

The 2007 Purdue Boilermakers football team represented Purdue University in the Big Ten Conference during the 2007 NCAA Division I FBS football season. Joe Tiller, in his 11th season at Purdue, was the team's head coach. The Boilermakers' home games were played at Ross–Ade Stadium in West Lafayette, Indiana. Purdue began the 2007 season unranked in preseason polls. Purdue played twelve regular season games during the 2007 season, including seven in West Lafayette. They played in the Motor City Bowl, where they defeated Central Michigan.

== Schedule ==
Date	Time	Opponent	Rank	Site	TV	Result	Attendance	Source
September 1	7:00 pm	at Toledo*		Glass Bowl; Toledo, OH	ESPNU	W 52–24	26,100	
September 8	12:00 pm	Eastern Illinois*		Ross–Ade Stadium; West Lafayette, IN	BTN	W 52–6	52,504	
September 15	12:00 pm	Central Michigan*		Ross–Ade Stadium; West Lafayette, IN	ESPN2	W 45–22	60,038	
September 22	9:00 pm	Minnesota		Hubert H. Humphrey Metrodome; Minneapolis, MN	ESPN2	W 45–31	47,483	
September 29	12:00 pm	Notre Dame*		Ross–Ade Stadium; West Lafayette, IN (rivalry)	ESPN	W 33–19	65,250	
October 6	8:00 pm	No. 4 Ohio State	No. 23	Ross–Ade Stadium; West Lafayette, IN	ABC	L 7–23	65,497	
October 13	12:00 pm	at Michigan		Michigan Stadium; Ann Arbor, MI	BTN	L 21–48	110,888	
October 20	12:00 pm	Iowa		Ross–Ade Stadium; West Lafayette, IN	ESPN2	W 31–6	58,123	
October 27	12:00 pm	Northwestern^{†}		Ross–Ade Stadium; West Lafayette, IN	BTN	W 35–17	58,237	
November 3	12:00 pm	at Penn State		Beaver Stadium; University Park, PA	ESPN	L 19–26	108,318	
November 10	12:00 pm	Michigan State		Ross–Ade Stadium; West Lafayette, IN	BTN	L 31–48	55,630	
November 17	3:30 pm	at Indiana		Memorial Stadium; Bloomington, IN (Old Oaken Bucket)	BTN	L 24–27	50,741	
December 26	7:30 pm	vs. Central Michigan*		Ford Field; Detroit, MI (Motor City Bowl)	ESPN	W 51–48	60,624	
*Non-conference game; ^{†}Homecoming; Rankings from AP Poll released prior to the game; All times are in Eastern time

== Game summaries ==
=== Toledo ===
Team	1	2	3	4	Total
• Purdue	14	14	9	15	52
Toledo	7	7	0	10	24

- Date: September 1
- Location: Glass Bowl, Toledo, Ohio

=== Eastern Illinois ===
Team	1	2	3	4	Total
Eastern Illinois	3	0	3	0	6
• Purdue	17	14	7	14	52

- Date: September 8
- Location: Ross–Ade Stadium, West Lafayette, Indiana

=== Central Michigan ===
Team	1	2	3	4	Total
Central Michigan	0	0	14	8	22
• Purdue	24	7	7	7	45

- Date: September 15
- Location: Ross–Ade Stadium, West Lafayette, Indiana

=== Minnesota ===
Team	1	2	3	4	Total
• Purdue	17	7	14	7	45
Minnesota	3	0	14	14	31

- Date: September 22
- Location: Hubert H. Humphrey Metrodome, Minneapolis, Minnesota
- Game start: 9:00 p.m. EST
- Game weather: indoors (dome)
- Source: ESPN

Scoring summary
1	14:46	PUR	Desmond Tardy 95-yard kickoff return (Chris Summers kick)	PUR 7-0
1	4:46	PUR	Kory Sheets 16-yard pass from Curtis Painter (Chris Summers kick)	PUR 14-0
1	2:25	PUR	Chris Summers 24-yard field goal	PUR 17-0
1	1:14	MINN	Joel Monroe 34-yard field goal	PUR 17-3
2	14:51	PUR	Cliff Avril 43-yard interception return (Chris Summers kick)	PUR 24-3
3	13:18	MINN	Duane Bennett 4-yard run (Joel Monroe kick)	PUR 24-10
3	9:37	PUR	Dorien Bryant 4-yard pass from Curtis Painter (Chris Summers kick)	PUR 31-10
3	7:10	MINN	Jay Thomas 1-yard run (Joel Monroe kick)	PUR 31-17
3	3:27	PUR	Kory Sheets 3-yard run (Chris Summers kick)	PUR 38-17
4	14:09	MINN	Eric Decker 15-yard pass from Adam Weber (Joel Monroe kick)	PUR 38-24
4	12:53	PUR	Dorien Bryant 16-yard pass from Curtis Painter (Chris Summers kick)	PUR 45-24
4	8:50	MINN	Adam Weber 2-yard run (Joel Monroe kick)	PUR 45-31

=== Notre Dame ===
Team	1	2	3	4	Total
Notre Dame	0	0	6	13	19
• Purdue	10	13	3	7	33

- Date: September 29
- Location: Ross–Ade Stadium, West Lafayette, IN
- Game start: 12:00 p.m. EST
- Television network: ESPN

Scoring summary
Q1	10:45	PUR	Summers 27 yard field goal	PUR 3–0
Q1	5:49	PUR	Sheets 1 yard run (Summers kick)	PUR 10–0
Q2	11:54	PUR	Summers 34 yard field goal	PUR 13–0
Q2	4:46	PUR	Bryant 11 yard pass from Painter (Summers kick)	PUR 20–0
Q2	2:50	PUR	Summers 26 yard field goal	PUR 23–0
Q3	7:55	ND	Carlson 5 yard pass from Clausen (kick failed)	PUR 23–6
Q3	:28	PUR	Summers 29 yard field goal	PUR 26–6
Q4	12:43	ND	Kamara 7 yard pass from Sharpley (kick failed)	PUR 26–12
Q4	7:58	ND	Tate 25 yard pass from Sharpley (Whitaker kick)	PUR 26–19
Q4	5:33	PUR	Keller 14 yard pass from Painter (Summers kick)	PUR 33–19

- PUR: Kory Sheets 27 Rush, 141 Yds

=== Ohio State ===
Team	1	2	3	4	Total
• Ohio St	14	3	3	3	23
Purdue	0	0	0	7	7

- Date: October 6
- Location: Ross–Ade Stadium, West Lafayette, Indiana

=== Michigan ===
Team	1	2	3	4	Total
Purdue	7	0	0	14	21
• Michigan	17	14	3	14	48

- Date: October 13
- Location: Michigan Stadium, Ann Arbor, Michigan

=== Iowa ===
Team	1	2	3	4	Total
Iowa	3	0	3	0	6
• Purdue	7	7	7	10	31

- Date: October 20
- Location: Ross–Ade Stadium, West Lafayette, Indiana

=== Northwestern ===
Team	1	2	3	4	Total
Northwestern	0	14	3	0	17
• Purdue	14	0	0	21	35

- Date: October 27
- Location: Ross–Ade Stadium, West Lafayette, Indiana

=== Penn State ===
Team	1	2	3	4	Total
Purdue	10	0	6	3	19
• Penn St	3	10	0	13	26

- Date: November 3
- Location: Beaver Stadium, University Park, Pennsylvania

=== Michigan State ===
Team	1	2	3	4	Total
• Michigan St	7	24	0	17	48
Purdue	0	21	3	7	31

- Date: November 10
- Location: Ross–Ade Stadium, West Lafayette, Indiana

=== Indiana ===
Team	1	2	3	4	Total
Purdue	0	3	7	14	24
• Indiana	7	10	7	3	27

- Date: November 17
- Location: Memorial Stadium, Bloomington, Indiana

=== Motor City Bowl ===
Team	1	2	3	4	Total
• Purdue	21	13	7	10	51
Central Michigan	6	7	28	7	48

- Date: December 26
- Location: Ford Field, Detroit, Michigan

Boilermaker kicker Chris Summers hit a 40-yard field goal as time expired to defeat the Central Michigan Chippewas 51–48. Purdue Quarterback Curtis Painter passed for a Motor City Bowl record 546 yards, going 35–54 with 3 touchdowns and 2 interceptions. Kory Sheets led the Boilermakers in rushing with 12 attempts for 27 yards and 2 touchdowns. Painter's favorite target was Greg Orton who caught 9 passes for 136 yards and 1 touchdown. For Central Michigan, QB Dan LeFevour went 17–34 with 292 yards and 4 touchdowns and no interceptions. He also led the Chippewas in rushing with 33 attempts for 114 yards and 2 touchdowns. LeFevour's favorite target was Bryan Anderson who caught 7 passes for 129 yards and 3 touchdowns. During the 1st half it was all Boilermakers, with Purdue leading 34–13 at the break. In the 2nd half the Chippewas started their comeback. It started with a 76-yard pass from LeFevour to Antonio Brown to make it 34–20. The Boilermakers then scored again on a 19-yard pass from Painter to Jake Standeford to make it 41–20. The Chippewas then proceeded to score three unanswered touchdowns, a 10-yard pass to Anderson, and the two rushing touchdowns by LeFevour to tie the game. With 8:19 left in the 4th quarter, Purdue retook the lead on a 13-yard run by Jaycen Taylor. With 1:09 left, LeFevour hit Anderson for 19 yards and a touchdown to tie it at 48. It would turn out that the Chippewas scored too quickly. Painter then led a drive full of short first down passes to the Chippewa 23, where Summers would kick his 40-yard walk-off field goal.

== Roster ==
(as of 07/10/2007)
Wide receivers: 1 Selwyn Lymon – junior; 3 Waynelle Gravesande – freshman; 6 Desmond Tardy – junior; 9 Dorien Bryant – senior; 18 Roberto McBean – junior; 21 Greg Orton – junior; 22 Dray Mason – sophomore; 82 Derek Benson – sophomore; 83 Joe Whitest – junior; 84 Byron Williams – RS senior; 86 Derrick Sherman – freshman; 87 Kris Staats – freshman; 88 Jake Standeford – RS senior; 80 James Garcia - "Freshman"; Offensive line: 50 Eric Hedstrom – sophomore; 51 Garrett Miller – junior; 55 Elliot Hood – RS senior; 56 Jonathan Patton Junior; 60 Zach Smith – junior; 61 Zach Jones – sophomore; 61 Chris Mattson – senior; 62 Andy Huffman – sophomore; 63 James Shepherd – freshman; 66 Jordan Grimes – senior; 68 Robbie Powell – RS senior; 69 Neal Tull – RS senior; 72 Justin Pierce – freshman; 73 Dan Zaleski – junior; 74 Sean Sester – junior; 75 Zach Reckman – sophomore; 77 Ryan Prater – freshman; 78 Cory Benton – junior; Tight ends: 28 Dustin Keller – senior; 80 Jerry Wasikowski – junior; 46 Matthew Kern – junior; 85 Kyle Adams – sophomore; 89 Colton McKey – freshman; Fullbacks: 44 Frank Halliburton – sophomore	Quarterbacks: 5 Justin Siller – freshman; 12 Curtis Painter – RS junior; 14 Joey Elliott – sophomore; 16 Jeff Panfil – freshman; 17 Chris Bennett – junior; Running backs: 23 Joe Williams – junior; 24 Kory Sheets – RS junior; 25 Dan Dierking – freshman; 33 Jaycen Taylor – junior; 34 Malcolm Harris – freshman; Defensive line: 32 Cliff Avril – senior; 45 Eugene Bright – senior; 49 Nickcaro Golding – freshman; 54 Jared Zwilling – sophomore; 70 Andrew Quintana – freshman; 71 Alex Magee – junior; 79 Jermaine Guynn – junior; 87 Mike McDonald – senior; 90 Ryan Baker – junior; 91 Preston Numa – freshman; 92 Mike Neal – sophomore; 93 Jeff Benjamin – RS senior; 94 Ryan Kerrigan – freshman; 95 Keyon Brown – sophomore; 97 Gerald Gooden – freshman; 98 Corey Chapman – freshman; 99 Nick Mondek – freshman; Linebackers: 17 Josh Ferguson – RS senior; 22 Delos Bhatti – senior; 27 Kevin Green – freshman; 29 Jason Werner – sophomore; 36 Dan Bick – senior; 39 John Humphrey – freshman; 41 Brian Ellis – junior; 42 Anthony Heygood – junior; 46 Jeff Lindsay – freshman; 47 Mike Durrett – RS senior; 57 Tyler Haston – freshman; 59 Stanford Keglar – RS senior; 81 DeVarro Greaves – freshman	Defensive backs: 2 Torri Williams – junior; 3 Frank Duong – junior; 4 Fabian Martin – junior; 5 Terrell Vinson – senior; 7 Brandon King– sophomore; 8 Keith Smith – sophomore; 10 Royce Adams – sophomore; 15 Charlton Williams – freshman; 19 Brandon Whittington – junior; 20 Brandon Erwin – sophomore; 23 Justin Scott – senior; 27 Jerad Grey – junior; 26 Aaron Lane – senior; 30 Joe Holland – freshman; 31 Josh McKinley – freshman; 35 David Pender – sophomore; 40 Jonte Lindsey – senior; 43 Adam Wolf – sophomore; Punters: 11 Jared Armstrong – senior; Kickers: 13 Chris Summers – sophomore; 8 Brody McKnight - Freshman

== 2008 NFL draft ==
Player	Position	Round	Pick	NFL club
Dustin Keller	Tight End	1	30	New York Jets
Cliff Avril	Defensive End	3	92	Detroit Lions
Stanford Keglar	Linebacker	4	134	Tennessee Titans
