= 2006 Purdue Boilermakers football team =

American college football season

2006 Purdue Boilermakers football

Champs Sports Bowl, L 7–24 vs. Maryland
- Conference: Big Ten Conference
- Record: 8–6 (5–3 Big Ten)
- Head coach: Joe Tiller (10th season)
- Co-offensive coordinators: Bill Legg (1st season); Ed Zaunbrecher (1st season)
- Offensive scheme: One-back shotgun spread
- Defensive coordinator: Brock Spack (10th season)
- Base defense: 4–3
- Captains: Mike Otto; Anthony Spencer
- Home stadium: Ross–Ade Stadium

2006 Big Ten Conference football standings
	Conf.			Overall
Team	W		L	W		L
No. 2 Ohio State $	8	–	0	12	–	1
No. 8 Michigan %	7	–	1	11	–	2
No. 7 Wisconsin	7	–	1	12	–	1
No. 24 Penn State	5	–	3	9	–	4
Purdue	5	–	3	8	–	6
Minnesota	3	–	5	6	–	7
Indiana	3	–	5	5	–	7
Northwestern	2	–	6	4	–	8
Iowa	2	–	6	6	–	7
Illinois	1	–	7	2	–	10
Michigan State	1	–	7	4	–	8
$ – BCS representative as conference champion; % – BCS at-large representative; Rankings from AP Poll

The 2006 Purdue Boilermakers football team represented Purdue University during the 2006 NCAA Division I FBS football season. The team was coached by Joe Tiller and played its home games at Ross–Ade Stadium. Purdue played thirteen games in the 2006 season, finishing with an 8–6 record and a loss in the 2006 Champs Sports Bowl to Maryland.

This was also the first season Purdue started games at the same local time with other teams in the Eastern Time Zone, as the State of Indiana began observing Daylight Saving Time earlier in the year.

== Pre-season ==
Purdue entered 2005 highly ranked and as a dark horse candidate to win the Big 10 before losing six straight and falling to 2–6 after a blowout loss to Penn State. While the Boilermakers finished the 2005 season 5–6, the team closed out the year on a three-game winning streak. Purdue's coaching staff experienced several changes in the off-season. Jim Chaney, the offensive coordinator, left for a position with the St. Louis Rams of the NFL. Bill Legg and Ed Zaunbrecher succeeded Chaney as dual offensive coordinators. The Boilermakers returned seven starters on offense and four on defense. The condition of Ross–Ade Stadium's turf became a major issue in the 2005 season. A permanent sod of Bermuda grass was laid down in the off-season to replace the old turf.

== Schedule ==
Date	Time	Opponent	Site	TV	Result	Attendance	Source
September 2	1:00 pm	Indiana State*	Ross–Ade Stadium; West Lafayette, IN		W 60–35	50,108	
September 9	1:00 pm	Miami (OH)*	Ross–Ade Stadium; West Lafayette, IN	ESPN360	W 38–31 ^{OT}	53,668	
September 16	1:00 pm	Ball State*	Ross–Ade Stadium; West Lafayette, IN	ESPN360	W 38–28	51,561	
September 23	12:00 pm	Minnesota^{†}	Ross–Ade Stadium; West Lafayette, IN	ESPN2	W 27–21	54,620	
September 30	2:30 pm	at No. 12 Notre Dame*	Notre Dame Stadium; Notre Dame, IN (Shillelagh Trophy)	NBC	L 21–35	80,795	
October 7	12:00 pm	at No. 19 Iowa	Kinnick Stadium; Iowa City, IA	ESPNU	L 17–47	70,585	
October 14	12:00 pm	at Northwestern	Ryan Field; Evanston, IL	ESPN+	W 31–10	27,171	
October 21	12:00 pm	No. 21 Wisconsin	Ross–Ade Stadium; West Lafayette, IN	ESPN	L 3–24	58,111	
October 28	12:00 pm	Penn State	Ross–Ade Stadium; West Lafayette, IN	ABC	L 0–12	58,025	
November 4	3:30 pm	at Michigan State	Spartan Stadium; East Lansing, MI	ESPNU	W 17–15	65,398	
November 11	12:00 pm	at Illinois	Memorial Stadium; Champaign, IL (Purdue Cannon)	ESPN+	W 42–31	44,266	
November 18	12:00 pm	Indiana	Ross–Ade Stadium; West Lafayette, IN (Old Oaken Bucket)	ESPNC	W 28–19	62,105	
November 25	11:00 pm	at No. 25 Hawaii*	Aloha Stadium; Honolulu, HI	KFVE	L 35–42	47,825	
December 29	8:00 pm	vs. Maryland*	Citrus Bowl; Orlando, FL (Champs Sports Bowl)	ESPN	L 7–24	40,168	
*Non-conference game; ^{†}Homecoming; Rankings from AP Poll released prior to the game; All times are in Eastern time

== Roster ==
(as of 09/18/2006)
Wide receivers: 1 Selwyn Lymon – sophomore; 6 Desmond Tardy – junior; 9 Dorien Bryant – junior; 18 Roberto McBean – junior; 19 Brandon Whittington – junior; 20 Andre Chattams – senior; 21 Greg Orton – sophomore; 82 Derek Benson – RS freshman; 83 Joe Whitest – sophomore; 84 Byron Williams – junior; 86 Chase Lecklider – senior; 87 Mario Swope – freshman; 87 Kris Staats – freshman; 88 Jake Standeford – junior; 89 Kyle Ingraham(ineligible) – senior; Offensive line: 50 Eric Hedstrom – RS freshman; 51 Garrett Miller – sophomore; 53 Nick Fincher – junior; 56 Jonathan Patton – sophomore; 57 Dan McGowen – senior; 60 Zach Smith – sophomore; 61 Chris Mattson – junior; 62 Andy Huffman – RS freshman; 64 Nick Raben – senior; 65 Mike Otto – senior; 66 Jordan Grimes – junior; 67 Uche Nwaneri – junior; 68 Robbie Powell – junior; 69 Neal Tull – junior; 72 Justin Pierce – freshman; 73 Dan Zaleski – sophomore; 74 Sean Sester – sophomore; 75 Zach Reckman – RS freshman; 76 Jason Kacinko – RS freshman; 77 Ryan Prater – freshman; 78 Cory Benton – sophomore; Tight ends: 3 Garrett Bushong – junior; 28 Dustin Keller – junior; 46 Matthew Kern – sophomore; 80 Jerry Wasikowski – sophomore; 85 Kyle Adams – freshman; 97 Alec Huber – RS freshman; Fullbacks: 44 Frank Halliburton – RS freshman	Quarterbacks: 10 Jacob Swank – freshman; 12 Curtis Painter – RS sophomore; 14 Joey Elliott – RS freshman; 16 Jeff Panfil – freshman; 17 Chris Bennett – RS sophomore; Running backs: 22 Dray Mason – RS freshman; 23 Joe Williams – sophomore; 24 Kory Sheets – sophomore; 26 Chris Ayers – junior; 31 Dario Camacho – junior; 33 Jaycen Taylor – sophomore; 42 Anthony Heygood – sophomore; Defensive line: 45 Eugene Bright – junior; 49 Anthony Spencer – senior; 54 Jared Zwilling – RS freshman; 58 Walt Higbee – freshman; 70 Andrew Quintana – freshman; 71 Alex Magee – sophomore; 79 Jermaine Guynn – sophomore; 87 Mike McDonald – junior; 90 Ryan Baker – sophomore; 91 Nick Cavallo – senior; 92 Mike Neal – RS freshman; 93 Jeff Benjamin – junior; 94 Corey Chapman – freshman; 95 Keyon Brown – RS freshman; Linebackers: 17 Josh Ferguson – junior; 22 Delos Bhatti – junior; 27 Kevin Green – freshman; 29 Jason Werner – sophomore; 30 George Hall – senior; 32 Cliff Avril – junior; 36 Dan Bick – junior; 39 John Humphrey – freshman; 41 John Lampert – senior; 46 Jeff Lindsay – freshman; 47 Mike Durrett – junior; 55 Andy Deeds – junior; 59 Stanford Keglar – junior; 81 Al Royal – senior	Defensive backs: 2 Torri Williams – sophomore; 3 Frank Duong – RS junior; 4 Fabian Martin – sophomore; 5 Zach Logan – sophomore; 7 Brandon King – sophomore; 8 Keith Smith – freshman; 10 Royce Adams – freshman; 15 Brandon Blackmon – junior; 16 Brandon Erwin – freshman; 23 Justin Scott – junior; 27 Jerad Grey – sophomore; 26 Aaron Lane – junior; 34 Terrell Vinson – junior; 35 David Pender – freshman; 37 Paul Dubler – RS senior; 40 Jonte Lindsey – junior; 43 Adam Wolf – RS freshman; 48 Pat Kohtz – senior; Punters: 11 Jared Armstrong – junior; Kickers: 8 Casey Welch – senior; 13 Chris Summers – freshman; 8 Brody McKnight – freshman

== Game summaries ==
=== Indiana State ===
Team	1	2	3	4	Total
Indiana St	7	14	7	7	35
• Purdue	23	3	14	20	60

- Date: September 2
- Location: Ross–Ade Stadium, West Lafayette, Indiana

Purdue opened up the 2006 campaign with a win over Division I-AA opponent Indiana State Purdue paid tribute to the 1966 Rose Bowl championship team by wearing throwback jerseys. The Boilermakers dominated the first quarter with touchdown runs by Kory Sheets and Curtis Painter and a safety sandwiched in between the running scores. The Sycamores of Indiana State then got on the board with a touchdown run by quarterback Reilly Murphy. Painter then completed a touchdown pass to Dorien Bryant to close out the first quarter scoring. Indiana St. took advantage of a special teams miscue by Purdue when they returned a punt for a touchdown. Purdue got a field goal from Chris Summers before the blocked punt in the second quarter. Indiana State also scored a rushing touchdown right before halftime. Painter and Sheets both scored rushing touchdowns in the third quarter, while Sycamores running back Tony West scored his second rushing touchdown of the day. Purdue blew open the game in the fourth quarter with three straight touchdowns. Kory Sheets scored his third rushing touchdown and Bryant caught two more TD passes from Painter. Indiana State capped off the scoring with two seconds left in the game when Murphy tossed a touchdown pass to receiver Brian Jackson.

=== Miami (OH) ===
Team	1	2	3	4	Total
Miami (OH)	0	3	14	14	31
• Purdue	0	10	7	21	38

- Date: September 9
- Location: Ross–Ade Stadium, West Lafayette, Indiana

Purdue took on the Redhawks in their second home game of the 2006 season. The first quarter ended with neither team scoring any points. Kory Sheets scored on a short touchdown run early in the second quarter. This was followed by a Nathan Parseghian field goal to get Miami on the board. Chris Summers connected from 43 yards out to give Purdue a 10–3 halftime lead. Mike Kokal threw two touchdown passes in the third quarter to Jake O'Connell and Dustin Woods for the Redhawks. Sheets added his second rushing touchdown of the game between the Miami scores, as the quarter ended in a 17–17 tie. Kokal threw two more touchdown passes, both to Ryne Robinson, the last coming with around 6 minutes remaining to tie the game at 31–31. Kory Sheets had opened the quarter with his third touchdown run. Curtis Painter tossed a touchdown pass Greg Orton before Robinson's second touchdown. Purdue had a chance to drive for the possible win in the fourth quarter but Painter was intercepted. Miami's last second field goal was blocked by Boilermaker defender Anthony Spencer. In overtime, Kory Sheets scored his fourth touchdown of the game and the Boilers' defense held for the 38–31 victory.

=== Ball State ===
Team	1	2	3	4	Total
Ball St	10	0	3	15	28
• Purdue	7	14	10	7	38

- Date: September 16
- Location: Ross–Ade Stadium, West Lafayette, Indiana

In the third game of the season, Purdue took on the Cardinals from Ball State. Ball State opened up the scoring with a touchdown pass from Joey Lynch to Louis Johnson. The Boilermakers responded with a 60-yard touchdown pass from Curtis Painter to tight end Dustin Keller. The Cardinals took a 10–7 lead at the end of the first quarter after a field goal. The only second-quarter scoring came from Purdue as Painter ran for a short touchdown and connected with halfback Kory Sheets on a 3-yard touchdown pass. Purdue extended its lead to 31–13 after three quarters following a touchdown run by Kory Sheets and a Chris Summers field goal. Painter tossed a second TD pass to Sheets in the final quarter before Ball State added two late scores from Brad Salyer and Darius Hill.

=== Minnesota ===
Team	1	2	3	4	Total
Minnesota	7	0	7	7	21
• Purdue	3	7	10	7	27

- Date: September 23
- Location: Ross–Ade Stadium, West Lafayette, Indiana

The Boilermakers kicked off the Big Ten season against the Golden Gophers. Minnesota scored on its very first possession of the game with a 1-yard run from Justin Valentine. Purdue responded in kind with a 39-yard field goal from kicker Chris Summers. The Boilers took a 10–7 halftime lead when Curtis Painter found Dorien Bryant for a 27-yard touchdown pass. Purdue extended its lead to 20–7 in the third quarter with a touchdown run by halfback Jaycen Taylor and another Summers field goal. Minnesota closed the gap to 20–14 heading into the fourth quarter when quarterback Bryan Cupito found tight end Matt Spaeth for a 1-yard touchdown pass. Painter connected with Taylor for a touchdown in the final quarter before Cupito found Logan Payne for his second touchdown pass of the day. The Purdue defense held off the Gophers final drive to preserve the 27–21 victory and move to 4–0.

=== Notre Dame ===
Team	1	2	3	4	Total
Purdue	7	7	0	7	21
• Notre Dame	14	14	7	0	35

- Date: September 30
- Location: Notre Dame Stadium, South Bend, Indiana
- Television network: NBC

Purdue traveled to Notre Dame, Indiana, for its first road game of the 2006 season to take on Notre Dame in their annual rivalry. The Irish went right down the field following the opening kickoff and scored on a short run by George West. Purdue answered later in the quarter to tie the game at 7–7 when Kory Sheets ran into the end zone from 7 yards out. Darius Walker put Notre Dame up 14–7 when he scored on a 14-yard run. Purdue fell behind 28–7 following Brady Quinn's 6-yard pass to Rhema McKnight and Jeff Samardzija's 5-yard touchdown run on a fake field goal. The Boilermakers responded right before halftime when Curtis Painter found Selwyn Lymon over the middle for an 88-yard touchdown pass. McKnight caught his second touchdown pass of the afternoon from Quinn for the only scoring in the third quarter. Lymon capped off his 238-yard receiving day with his second touchdown catch of the day midway through the final quarter. The Boilermakers were unable to further score and the Irish retained possession of the Shillelagh Trophy.

=== Iowa ===
Team	1	2	3	4	Total
Purdue	0	3	14	0	17
• Iowa	14	6	14	13	47

- Date: October 7
- Location: Kinnick Stadium, Iowa City, Iowa

The Iowa Hawkeyes welcomed Purdue to Kinnick Stadium one week after losing their much anticipated game against top-ranked Ohio State. Iowa jumped on Purdue early and often, opening up a 14–0 first quarter lead with a touchdown run by Damian Sims and a pass from quarterback Drew Tate to fullback Tom Busch. Kyle Schlicher added two field goals in the second quarter and the Hawkeyes lead 20–3 at halftime. Purdue's only first half scoring came on a 44-yard field goal by freshman Chris Summers. Sims scored again on Iowa's first possession of the second half before Greg Orton caught an 18-yard touchdown pass from Curtis Painter. Tate then hit tight end Scott Chandler for a touchdown and Purdue then responded with a Jaycen Taylor touchdown run. The Boilermakers could get no closer as they were shut out in the fourth quarter. Shonn Greenne scored on a short run and Adam Shada returned an interception of a Curtis Painter pass 98 yards for a touchdown.

=== Northwestern ===
Team	1	2	3	4	Total
• Purdue	7	10	7	7	31
Northwestern	7	3	0	0	10

- Date: October 14
- Location: Ryan Field, Evanston, Illinois

Purdue broke its two-game losing streak with one of its best defensive efforts of the 2006 season. Brandon Roberson put the Northwestern Wildcats on the scoreboard first with a 7-yard touchdown run. Jaycen Taylor then added his own 7-yard run for a score for the Boilermakers. Curtis Painter connected with Dustin Keller on a 19-yard scoring strike in the opening seconds of the second quarter. Northwestern added a field goal before Purdue answered with an 18-yard kick by Chris Summers to give the Boilermakers a 17–10 halftime lead. Purdue shut out the Wildcats in the second half and held the Northwestern offense to 251 yards for the game. Jake Standeford, younger brother of former standout Purdue receiver John Standeford, caught a 1-yard pass from Painter to put Purdue up by two touchdowns by the end of the third quarter. Painter then scored on a 3-yard touchdown run in the final quarter to give Purdue the 31–10 victory.

=== Wisconsin ===
Team	1	2	3	4	Total
• Wisconsin	0	10	7	7	24
Purdue	3	0	0	0	3

- Date: October 21
- Location: Ross–Ade Stadium, West Lafayette, Indiana

For the first time in the 2006 season, the Boilermakers struggled to produce an effective and consistent offensive effort. The Wisconsin defense held Purdue to a mere 286 total yards for the game and the Purdue passing game was limited to 187 yards by the Badgers. Purdue's only points of the game came on a Chris Summers 47-yard field goal in the first quarter. Wisconsin freshman sensation P. J. Hill, Jr. scored from the one-yard line in the second quarter and Taylor Mehlhaff added a 51-yard field goal a minute before halftime to give the Badgers a 10–3 advantage. Hill scored his second touchdown of the day in the third quarter and finished with 161 yards rushing for the game. Jamal Cooper finished off the scoring in the final quarter with an 8-yard run to give the Badgers the 24–3 victory, their third straight over Purdue.

=== Penn State ===
Team	1	2	3	4	Total
• Penn St	3	3	0	6	12
Purdue	0	0	0	0	0

- Date: October 28
- Location: Ross–Ade Stadium, West Lafayette, Indiana

For the first time in the Joe Tiller coaching era at Purdue the Boilermakers were shut out by an opponent. The Penn State defense held Purdue to 240 yards for the game and forced three Boilermaker turnovers. Kevin Kelly kicked a 29-yard field goal in the first quarter and a 44-yard field goal in the second quarter to give the Nittany Lions a 6–0 halftime lead. While Purdue's defense kept them in the game, the offense could not capitalize. Tony Hunt ran for 142 yards and scored the only touchdown of the day on a 2-yard run early in the fourth quarter. The Nittany Lions won in West Lafayette for the first time since 1999.

=== Michigan State ===
Team	1	2	3	4	Total
• Purdue	7	7	0	3	17
Michigan St	0	6	3	6	15

- Date: November 4
- Location: Spartan Stadium, East Lansing, Michigan

The Boilermakers snapped their two-game losing streak with a 17–15 victory over Michigan State. Purdue scored first on a 25-yard touchdown pass from Curtis Painter to Dorien Bryant. The Spartans added two field goals in the second quarter before Purdue took a 14–6 halftime lead on Bryant's second touchdown catch from Painter. The only third quarter scoring was done by the Spartans on a field goal. Michigan State took a 15–14 lead when Drew Stanton threw a 21-yard touchdown pass to T.J. Williams. Purdue took the lead for good with about five minutes remaining in the game when senior kicker Casey Welch kicked the game-winning 18-yard field goal.

=== Illinois ===
Team	1	2	3	4	Total
• Purdue	7	7	14	14	42
Illinois	10	6	7	8	31

- Date: November 11
- Location: Memorial Stadium, Champaign, Illinois

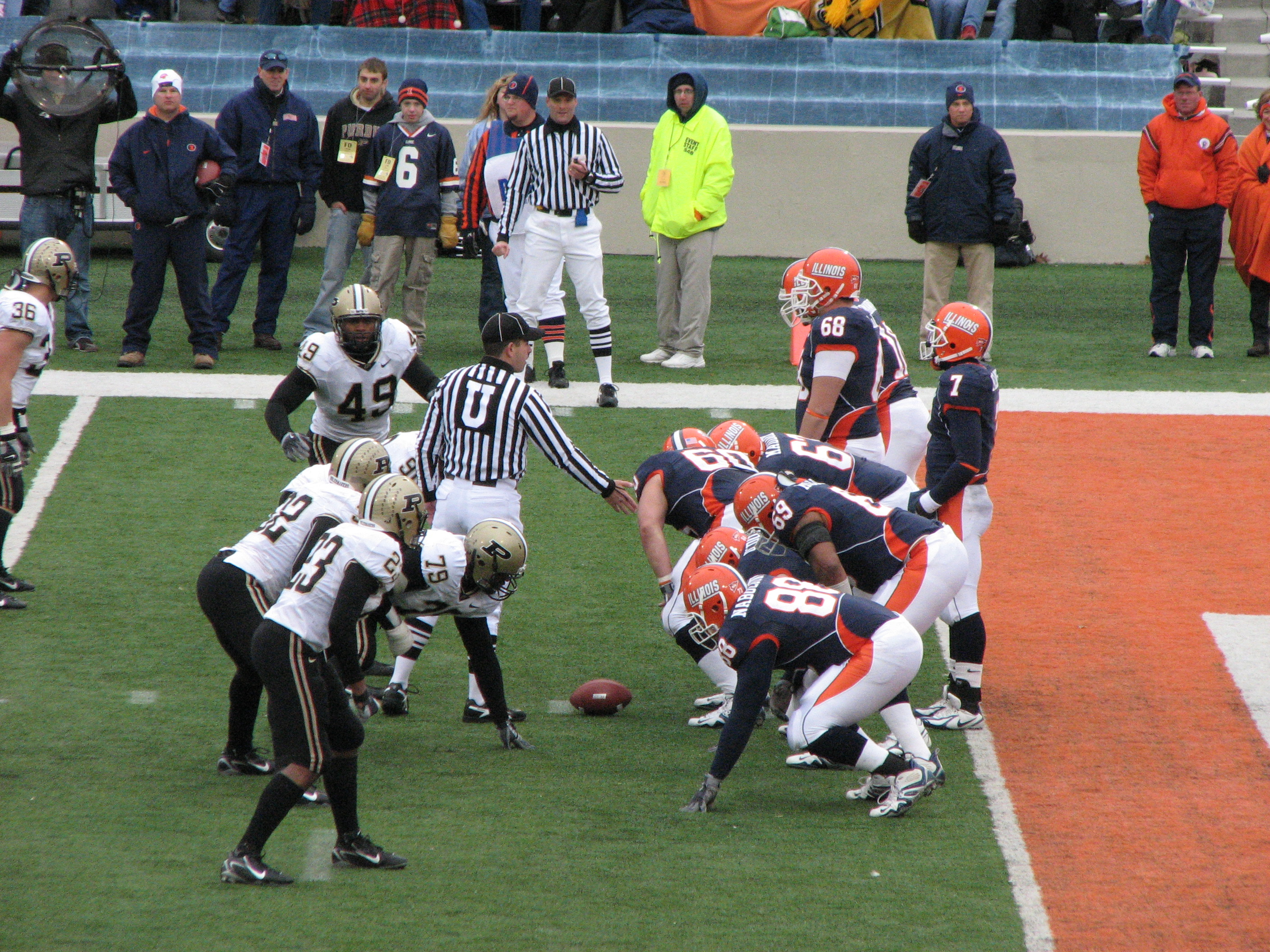
Purdue's defense lining up against Illinois on November 11, 2006

Purdue became bowl-eligible for the first time since the 2004 season with their second consecutive conference road victory. The Boilers had trouble containing the Illinois running game, as Pierre Thomas and Isiah Williams both rushed for over 100 yards for the game. Williams, the Fighting Illini quarterback, scored the game's first touchdown on a 20-yard run. Jason Reda added a 38-yard field goal to give Illinois a 10–0 lead. Kory Sheets scored from 3 yards out to cut the deficit to 3 by the end of the third quarter. Alex Magee recovered a Williams fumble in the end zone for Purdue, as the Boilermakers took the lead for the first time in the game. Reda kicked two second-quarter field goals to give Illinois a 16–14 halftime lead. Rashard Mendenhall extended the Illinois advantage to 23–14 in the third quarter. Curtis Painter then ran 42 yards for a touchdown and hit Dorien Bryant for a 20-yard scoring strike to put the Boilermakers back in the lead. Painter and Bryant both scored in the fourth quarter on runs of 18 and 6 yards, respectively. Thomas added the final score of the game on a 1-yard touchdown run with 7 minutes left in the contest.

=== Indiana ===
Team	1	2	3	4	Total
Indiana	0	3	10	6	19
• Purdue	7	0	14	7	28

- Date: November 25
- Location: Ross–Ade Stadium, West Lafayette, Indiana

The annual battle for the Old Oaken Bucket trophy saw the Boilermakers extend their winning streak over Indiana to five games. The first half of the game featured several turnovers by both teams. Purdue managed the only first half touchdown on a 3-yard run by Jaycen Taylor in the first quarter. The Hoosiers responded with a second-quarter field goal to go into halftime down 7–3. In the second half, Greg Orton caught a 14-yard touchdown pass from Curtis Painter. Indiana quarterback Kellen Lewis ran in a 16-yard touchdown, which was then followed by a short touchdown run by Kory Sheets of Purdue. After another Indiana field goal, Purdue led 21–13 at the close of the third quarter. Hoosier wide receiver James Hardy caught a 7-yard touchdown from Lewis. Indiana then tried to tie the game with a two-point conversion but the Boilermakers defense held. Purdue made the score 28–19 on a 15-yard Dorien Bryant touchdown run with five minutes left in the game. Indiana, which amassed over 500 total offensive yards in the game, began moving the ball steadily until the Purdue defense stopped the Hoosiers on a 4th down and short yardage play. The game features 9 turnovers in total; 5 by Purdue and 4 by Indiana.

=== Hawaii ===
Team	1	2	3	4	Total
Purdue	0	0	14	21	35
• Hawaii	7	10	3	22	42

- Date: November 25
- Location: Aloha Stadium, Honolulu, Hawaii

For the first time since the 2001 season, Purdue played their final regular-season game against a team other than Indiana. The first half of the game was dominated by Hawai'i. Nate Ilaoa, the Warriors' halfback, scored the first two touchdowns of the game on runs of 4 and 16 yards. Hawai'i added a short field goal with only a few seconds remaining in the second quarter to go up 17–0 at halftime. Purdue's offense cut the deficit to 17–14 after a touchdown pass from Curtis Painter to tight end Dustin Keller and a wide receiver option pass from Desmond Tardy to Kyle Adams. Hawai'i then added a field goal to push their lead back to 6 points at the end of the third quarter. The final quarter featured six touchdowns, three by each school, as Painter and Hawai'i quarterback Colt Brennan each threw 3 touchdown passes. Painter first found Greg Orton from 28 yards out. Brennan then answered with a pass to Ross Dickerson to give the Warriors the lead again. Painter next found Keller again before putting Purdue up 35–27 after Selywn Lymon caught Painter's fourth touchdown pass of the game. Brennan led Hawai'i back by throwing a touchdown pass to Ryan Grice-Mullen and then hitting him again for the two-point conversion to tie the game at 35–35. After an interception was thrown by Painter, Hawai'i took the lead for good when Brennan found Ian Sample for the winning score. Brennan threw for 434 yards for the game and led the Hawai'i offense to over 650 total yards. Purdue finished the regular season at 8–5.

=== Maryland ===
Team	1	2	3	4	Total
Purdue	0	7	0	0	7
• Maryland	7	14	3	0	24

- Date: December 29
- Location: Citrus Bowl, Orlando, Florida

Purdue closed out the 2006 season by competing in their ninth bowl game under head coach Joe Tiller. Maryland controlled the game from the beginning and Purdue's offense only managed to score once in a 24–7 defeat. Maryland quarterback Sam Hollenbach put the Terrapins ahead 7–0 after the first of two touchdown passes on the day, this one to Joey Haynos. Maryland opened up a 14–0 lead after a 1-yard run by Cory Jackson. Hollenbach then threw his second touchdown pass, a 46-yard strike to Darrius Heyward-Bey. Purdue narrowed the gap to 21–7 before halftime when Curtis Painter connected with Greg Orton from 12 yards out. Both defenses controlled the second half, with the only scoring being a Maryland field goal. Purdue was out gained 429–285 and was a −2 in the turnover margin.

== Post-season ==
The Big Ten coaches and media selected Anthony Spencer to the first team all-conference squad. Wide receiver Dorien Bryant was chosen by the coaches for the second team, while the writers picked Bryant for the first team. Mike Otto was also named by the coaches to second team offensive squad.

Three Boilermaker football players were selected in the 2007 NFL draft. Defensive End Anthony Spencer was selected in the first round by the Dallas Cowboys. Offensive Linemen Uche Nwaneri and Mike Otto were also drafted by the Jacksonville Jaguars and Tennessee Titans, respectively.

=== 2007 NFL draft ===
Player	Position	Round	Pick	NFL club
Anthony Spencer	Defensive End	1	26	Dallas Cowboys
Uche Nwaneri	Offensive Lineman	5	149	Jacksonville Jaguars
Mike Otto	Offensive Lineman	7	223	Tennessee Titans
