= Curtis Painter =

American football player (born 1985)

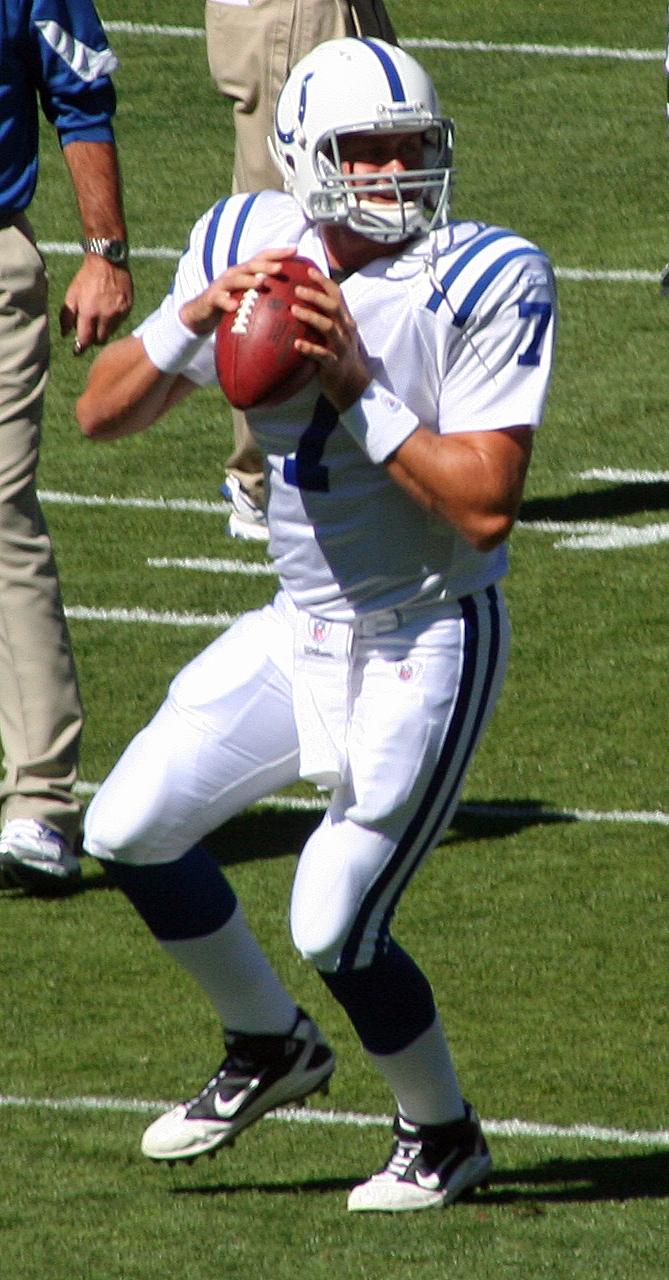
- Painter with the Indianapolis Colts in 2010

No. 7, 17
- Position: Quarterback

Personal information
- Born: June 24, 1985 (age 41); Watseka, Illinois, U.S.
- Listed height: 6 ft 4 in (1.93 m)
- Listed weight: 230 lb (104 kg)

Career information
- High school: Vincennes Lincoln (Vincennes, Indiana)
- College: Purdue (2004–2008)
- NFL draft: 2009: 6th round, 201st overall pick

Career history
- Indianapolis Colts (2009–2011); Baltimore Ravens (2012)*; New York Giants (2013)
- * Offseason or practice squad member only

Career NFL statistics
- Passing attempts: 287
- Passing completions: 148
- Completion percentage: 51.6%
- TD–INT: 6–13
- Passing yards: 1,681
- Passer rating: 57.6
- Rushing yards: 109
- Stats at Pro Football Reference

Curtis Matthew Painter (born June 24, 1985) is an American former professional football player who was a quarterback in the National Football League (NFL). He played college football for the Purdue Boilermakers and was selected by the Indianapolis Colts in the sixth round of the 2009 NFL draft.

== Early life ==
Curtis Painter was born in Watseka, Illinois. During his freshman year, Painter moved to Vincennes, Indiana, where he attended Lincoln High School and was a PrepStar All-American. During his high school football career, Painter had a three-year record of 28–7 with 4,946 passing yards, 49 passing touchdowns, and 17 rushing touchdowns. He ended his high school career a finalist on the Mr. Football ballot and led his team to an 11–2 record and a conference championship and a sectional championship.

Painter was a 3-star rated Pro-Style Quarterback ranked by rivals.com before committing to play for Purdue University. He also played baseball and basketball for the Alices.

College recruiting
Name	Hometown	School	Height	Weight	40^{‡}	Commit date
Curtis Painter; QB	Vincennes, Indiana	Lincoln High School	6 ft 4 in (1.93 m)	200 lb (91 kg)	4.75	Oct 8, 2003
Curtis Painter; QB	Recruit ratings: Scout: Rivals: 247Sports:					
Overall recruit ranking: Scout: 24 (QB) Rivals: 21 (QB), 5 (IN)
‡ Refers to 40-yard dash; Note: In many cases, Scout, Rivals, 247Sports, On3, and ESPN may conflict in their listings of height, weight and 40 time.; In these cases, the average was taken. ESPN grades are on a 100-point scale.; Sources: "2004 Team Ranking". Rivals.com.

Painter committed to Purdue University on October 8, 2003. Painter was not heavily recruited as he only received FBS scholarship offers from Purdue, Ball State and Indiana.

== College career ==
Painter committed to play for Purdue University on July 28, 2003, under head coach Joe Tiller. After redshirting in 2004, Painter backed up starting quarterback Brandon Kirsch for the first six games of the 2005 season, ultimately replacing Kirsch as the starter for the last five games of the season. On the season, Painter completed 89 of 170 passes, for 932 yards, with 3 touchdowns and 5 interceptions. Painter became the Boilermakers' starting quarterback indefinitely after Kirsch declared for the NFL draft and left Purdue a year early.

Painter started in 14 games in his sophomore season, where he threw for 22 touchdowns and rushed for six. He set the Big Ten Conference record in seasonal passing yards, breaking Drew Brees' 3,983 mark with 3,985. His 284.6 passing yards per game ranked seventh in the nation, while leading the conference. He led the Boilermakers to the Champs Sports Bowl, resulting in a 24–7 loss to Maryland.

Starting in every game in his junior season, Painter threw 29 touchdown passes and rushed for 3. Painter's 3,985 passing yards in 2006 are the most in a single season in Purdue history, beating Drew Brees' 3,983 in 1998. Painter averaged 295.9 yards per game, which was 12th most in the nation, while tying Brees's Big Ten season record with 569 attempts. He threw for six touchdowns, completing 38 of 49 attempts with 348 total yards against Eastern Illinois. In the 2007 Motor City Bowl against Central Michigan, Painter completed 35 of his 54 passes, with three touchdowns and threw for a Motor City Bowl record 546 yards with 540 total yards.

In his last season as the Boilermakers' main starting quarterback, the fifth year senior struggled with the absence of injured running back Jaycen Taylor and the graduation of Dustin Keller and Dorian Bryant. He hurt his throwing shoulder resulting in a 4–8 overall record and only appeared in 10 games with nine starts, while reserve quarterbacks, Justin Siller and Joey Elliot, stepped in his place. His top game on the season came against Indiana in his last collegiate game, where he threw for five touchdowns, while completing 38 of 54 attempts with a total of 448 yards.

Painter received criticism for his inability to win in games against teams ranked in the top 25 polls, which overwhelmed his career record numbers amongst the likes of his predecessors in Kyle Orton and Drew Brees. He started in 41 of the 46 games in which he appeared and went 987 of 1,648 with a total of 11,163 passing yards and threw for 67 touchdowns with 46 interceptions. He was co-captain along with Ryan Baker and Jermaine Guynn for the 2008 football season. He holds a degree in computer graphics technology.

== Professional career ==
=== Pre-draft ===
Prior to the 2009 NFL draft, Painter was projected to be drafted in the seventh round by NFLDraftScout.com. He was rated as the thirteenth-best quarterback in the draft.

External videos
- Video analysis of Painter before the draft.

Pre-draft measurables
Height	Weight	40-yard dash	10-yard split	20-yard split	20-yard shuttle	Three-cone drill	Vertical jump	Broad jump
6 ft 3 in (1.91 m)	225 lb (102 kg)	4.87 s	1.69 s	2.84 s	4.48 s	7.00 s	29 in (0.74 m)	8 ft 6 in (2.59 m)
All values from 2009 NFL Scouting Combine

=== Indianapolis Colts ===
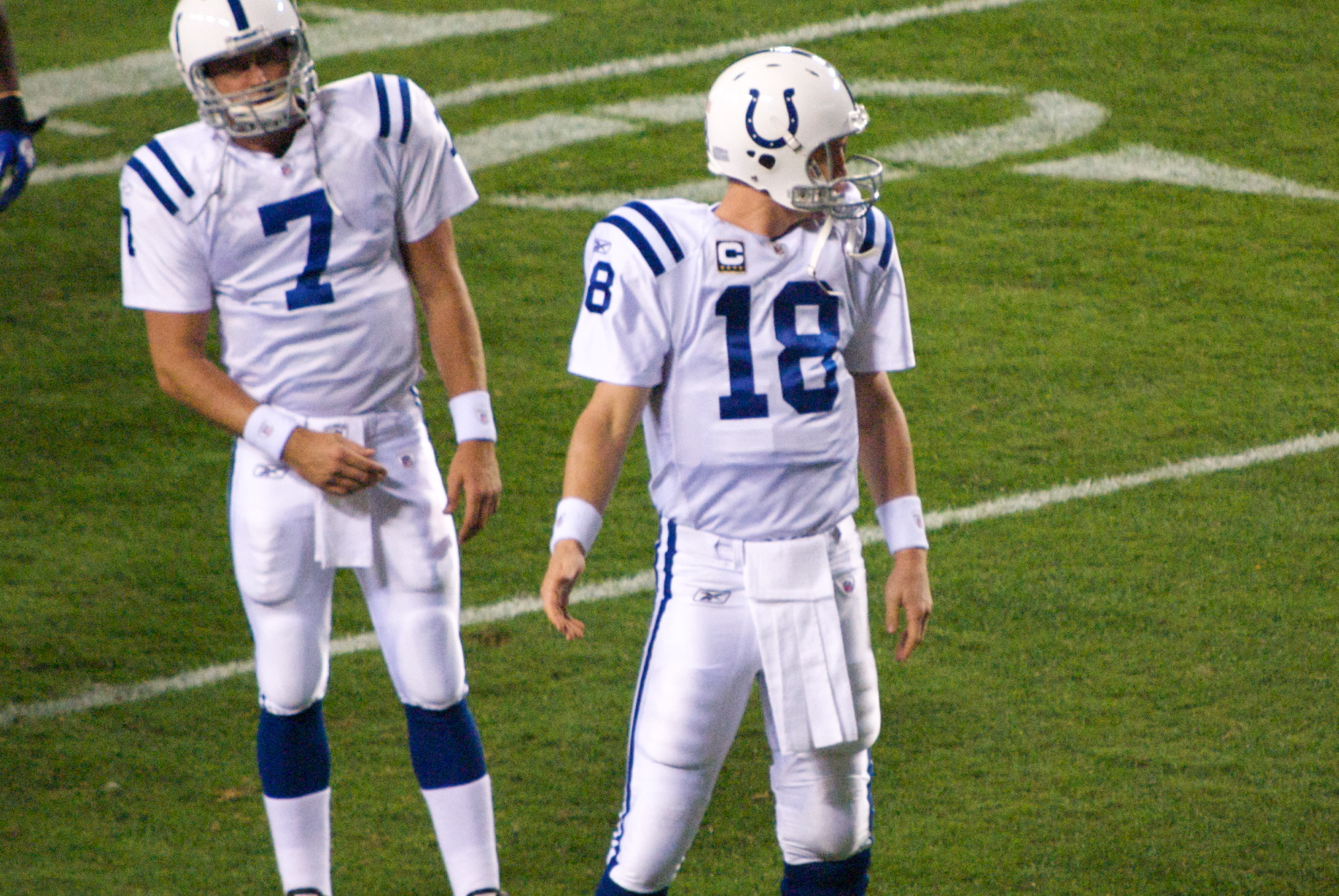
Painter (left) and Peyton Manning at a 2010 game.

Painter was selected in the sixth round of the 2009 NFL draft by the Indianapolis Colts. Behind starting quarterback Peyton Manning, Painter was a reserve along with Jim Sorgi. Painter became the second-string quarterback in December 2009 after Sorgi went on injured reserve and Drew Willy was called in as second back-up. Painter saw no game action as the backup to Manning in 2009 until weeks 16 and 17, when head coach Jim Caldwell decided to rest his starters for the playoffs after clinching the No. 1 seed in the 2010 NFL Playoffs. Painter made his debut on December 27, 2009, against the New York Jets, throwing an interception and losing a fumble that was returned for a touchdown, resulting in the first loss of the season (after winning the first 14 contests). He also took the reins during the first quarter the following week in Buffalo, which also resulted in a loss.

Painter was relegated to third-string quarterback for the Colts at the start of the 2011 season when the Colts signed Kerry Collins to take over for Manning after an offseason neck surgery sidelined him. Painter replaced an injured Collins in Week 3 against the Pittsburgh Steelers. In that game he went 5 for 10 with 60 yards and a fumble.

The following week, Painter started his first NFL game in week 4 of the 2011 season against the Tampa Bay Buccaneers on October 3, 2011.

Painter's first career touchdown pass to Pierre Garçon against the Buccaneers, was the fifth longest touchdown pass in Colts history at 87 yards. Painter made eight starts for the injured Peyton Manning during the 2011 regular season but did not lead the Colts to a victory in any game before being benched in favor of third-string quarterback Dan Orlovsky prior to the December 4, 2011 Week 13 game versus the New England Patriots. He was released after the 2011 season on March 9, 2012.

=== Baltimore Ravens ===
The Baltimore Ravens signed Painter on April 19, 2012. Painter was signed after the Ravens conducted tryout sessions that also included former Ravens draft choice Kyle Boller and former Steelers quarterback Dennis Dixon. The signing reunited Painter with his former head coach in Indianapolis, Jim Caldwell, who was hired as the Ravens quarterbacks coach on January 30, 2012.

Painter was able to post good numbers against the Atlanta Falcons 3rd team defense during a Thursday night exhibition game. Painter threw for 3 touchdowns, and nearly 70 yards. He was still released on August 31, as the Ravens chose to go with the previous year's 6th Round Pick Tyrod Taylor, who had versatility on his side.

=== New York Giants ===
On January 4, 2013, Painter signed a reserve contract with the New York Giants. Painter filled in for Eli Manning in the second half of week seventeen against the Washington Redskins after Manning suffered a sprained ankle near the end of the first half. Early in the second half, Painter's pass was intercepted by Reed Doughty. On March 12, 2014, Painter signed an undisclosed contract extension to stay with the franchise. According to the Giants on April 29, 2014, Painter was expected to miss at least four weeks after undergoing arthroscopic surgery on his right knee. Painter was released by the Giants on August 30, 2014, when Giants' coach Tom Coughlin decided to keep backup quarterback Ryan Nassib as the second string QB behind Eli Manning rather than keeping three QBs.

== Career statistics ==
=== NFL ===
Year	Team	Games		Passing								Rushing			
Year	Team	GP	GS	Cmp	Att	Pct	Yds	Y/A	TD	Int	Rtg	Att	Yds	Avg	TD
2009	IND	2	0	8	28	28.6	83	3.0	0	2	9.8	3	4	1.3	0
2010	IND	0	0	DNP											
2011	IND	9	8	132	243	54.3	1,541	6.3	6	9	66.6	17	107	6.3	0
2013	NYG	3	0	8	16	50.0	57	3.6	0	2	19.0	3	-2	-0.7	0
Career		14	8	148	287	51.6	1,681	5.9	6	13	57.6	23	109	4.7	0

=== College ===
Year	Team	Games		Passing							Rushing			Receiving		
Year	Team	GP	GS	Cmp	Att	Pct	Yds	TD	Int	Rtg	Att	Yds	TD	Rec	Yds	TD
2005	Purdue	9	5	89	170	52.4	932	3	5	98.3	52	251	4	0	0	0
2006	Purdue	14	14	315	530	59.4	3,985	22	19	129.6	76	107	6	0	0	0
2007	Purdue	13	13	356	569	62.6	3,846	29	11	132.3	53	-20	3	0	0	0
2008	Purdue	10	9	227	379	59.9	2,400	13	11	118.6	44	10	0	1	18	0
Totals		46	41	987	1,648	59.9	11,163	67	46	119.7	225	348	13	1	18	0

== Personal life ==
Painter currently resides in Westfield, Indiana with his wife Meg Painter. He is currently Managing Partner of Indiana Liquor Group.
