= Kyle Adams (American football) =

American football player (born 1988)

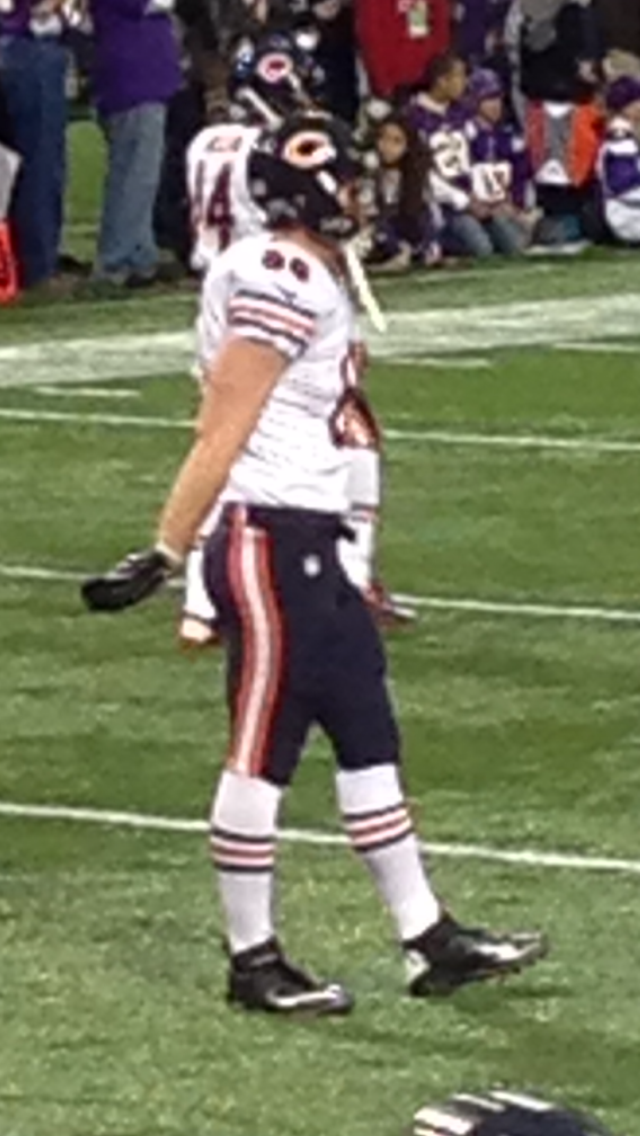
- Adams with the Chicago Bears in 2012

No. 88, 86
- Position: Tight end

Personal information
- Born: January 19, 1988 (age 38); Wellesley, Massachusetts, U.S.
- Listed height: 6 ft 4 in (1.93 m)
- Listed weight: 255 lb (116 kg)

Career information
- High school: Westlake (Austin, Texas)
- College: Purdue
- NFL draft: 2011: undrafted

Career history
- Chicago Bears (2011–2013); Tampa Bay Buccaneers (2013)

Career NFL statistics
- Receptions: 4
- Receiving yards: 40
- Stats at Pro Football Reference

Kyle Robert Adams (born January 19, 1988) is an American former professional football player who was a tight end in the National Football League (NFL). He was signed by the Chicago Bears as an undrafted free agent in 2011. He played college football for the Purdue Boilermakers.

== Early life ==
Adams was born on January 19, 1988, in Wellesley, Massachusetts, to Anne and Robert Adams. He attended Westlake High School in Austin where he played football and basketball. He attended the same high school as another famous Purdue alumnus, Drew Brees. His teammates at Westlake included future Philadelphia Eagles quarterback Nick Foles, Baltimore Ravens kicker Justin Tucker, and Los Angeles Rams linebacker Bryce Hager. As a junior, Adams had eight receptions, and as a senior he caught nine passes for 100 yards and one touchdown.

He helped lead the team to district title every season he was there, and a quarterfinals appearance in 2003. In the classroom he was an Academic All-State and a National Merit Scholarship finalist.

College recruiting
Name	Hometown	School	Height	Weight	40^{‡}	Commit date
Kyle Adams; TE	Austin, Texas	Westlake High School	6 ft 5 in (1.96 m)	225 lb (102 kg)	4.8	Jun 29, 2005
Kyle Adams; TE	Recruit ratings: Scout: Rivals: (72)					
Overall recruit ranking: Scout: 65 (TE) Rivals: -- (TE), -- (TX) ESPN: 57 (TE)
‡ Refers to 40-yard dash; Note: In many cases, Scout, Rivals, 247Sports, On3, and ESPN may conflict in their listings of height, weight and 40 time.; In these cases, the average was taken. ESPN grades are on a 100-point scale.; Sources: "2006 Team Ranking". Rivals.com.

Adams committed to Purdue University on June 29, 2008. Adams wasn't heavily recruited as he only had one other FBS scholarship offer from Duke.

== College career ==
During the 2006 season, his first year, Adams appeared in eight games, including one start. He made his Boilermakers debut He caught his first two career passes for 17 yards at Northwestern on October 14 He later had his first career touchdown on a 25-yard pass from wide receiver Desmond Tardy at Hawai'i on November 25. For the season he had six receptions for 58 yards and one touchdown.

In 2007, he received the team's Newcomer Award, which is awarded to an offensive and defensive player who, in his first spring practice, makes the most progress.

Adams sustained a season-ending knee injury in the season opener against Northern Colorado in 2008. In 2010, Adams served as team captain, and led the team with 36 catches for 244 yards.

=== Statistics ===
Season	Team	Goames		Receiving				
Season	Team	GP	GS	Rec	Yds	Avg	Lng	TD
2006	Purdue	8	1	6	58	9.7	25	1
2007	Purdue	13	1	8	109	13.6	28	2
2008	Purdue	1	1	0	0	0.0	0	0
2009	Purdue	12	12	29	249	8.6	23	0
2010	Purdue	12	12	36	244	6.8	19	0
Career		46	27	79	660	8.4	28	3

== Professional career ==
=== Pre-draft ===
Prior to the 2011 NFL draft, Adams was projected to be undrafted by NFLDraftScout.com. He was rated as the twentieth-best tight end in the draft. Adams wasn't invited to the 2011 NFL Scouting Combine in Indianapolis, but he was able to showcase his talents during Purdue's annual Pro Day.

Pre-draft measurables
Height	Weight	40-yard dash	10-yard split	20-yard split	20-yard shuttle	Three-cone drill	Vertical jump	Broad jump	Bench press
6 ft 4.6 in (1.95 m)	257 lb (117 kg)	4.83 s	1.59 s	2.69 s	4.35 s	7.10 s	33 in (0.84 m)	10 ft 02 in (3.10 m)	24 reps
All values from 2011 Purdue Pro Day

=== Chicago Bears ===
Adams was signed by the Bears as an undrafted free agent on July 26, 2011. He was released on September 2, 2013. On September 3, Adams was brought back by the Bears. He was released again on September 9, 2013.

=== Tampa Bay Buccaneers ===
On November 27, 2013, Adams was signed by the Tampa Bay Buccaneers.

== Personal life ==
Adams, a devout Christian, is a member of the Ephraim Orphan Project, an organization that provides aid to orphans in Haiti. In May 2012, Adams made a visit to the country to build a security fence as part of the construction of an orphanage, along with conducting sports camps and donating goods to other orphanages, his fifth visit. During his time at Purdue, he made three trips to Haiti as a member of the Fellowship of Christian Athletes, including a visit in February 2012.

"My first time there in 2008 I accepted Christ as my savior and became a Christian, which was a great moment for me. When I was down there I saw the poverty in Haiti, and the Bible calls us to help those who are poor, who are impoverished and who are struggling."

— Kyle Adams
