= Greg Orton (wide receiver) =

American football player (born 1986)

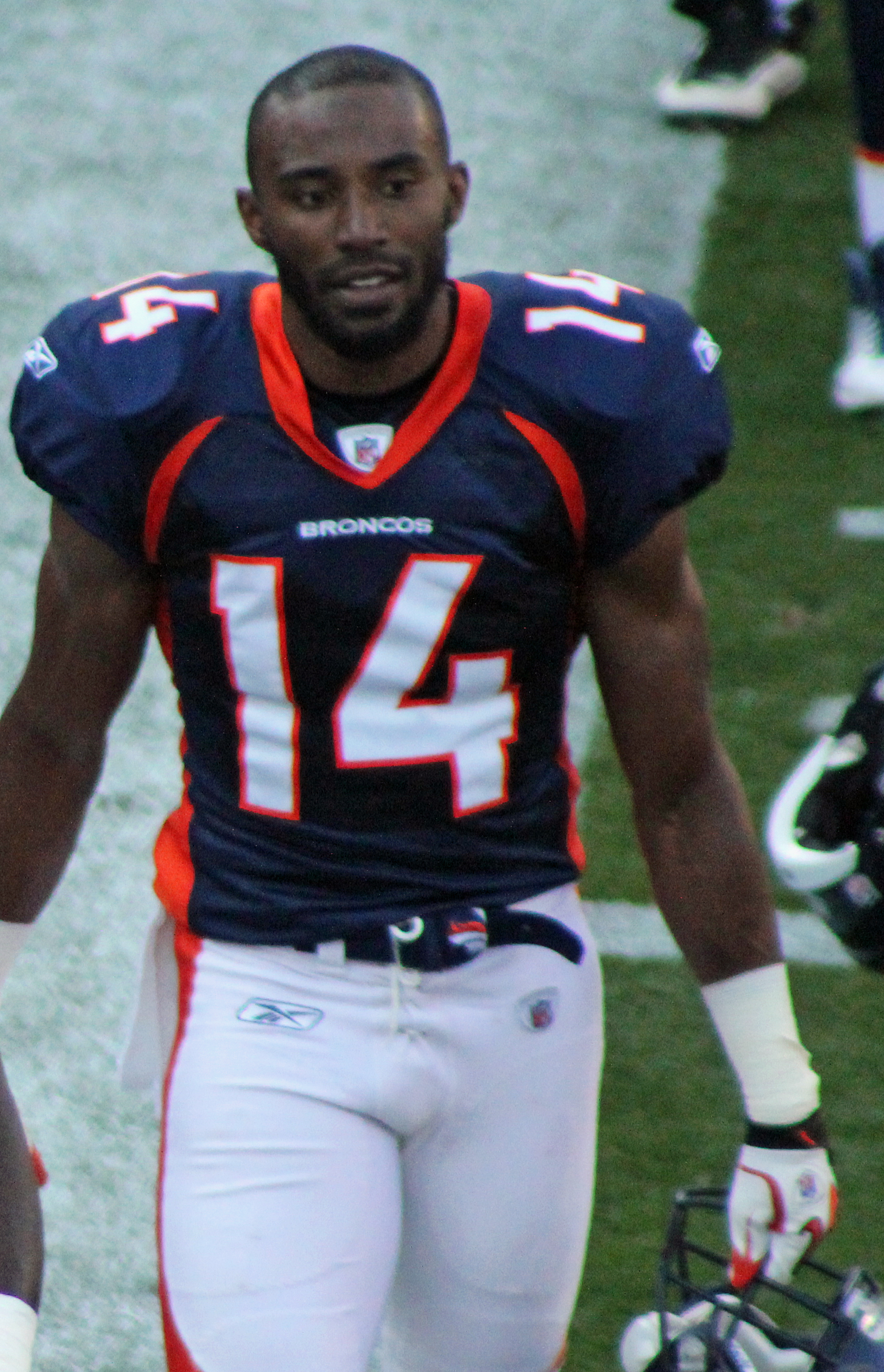
- Orton with the Denver Broncos in 2011

No. 14, 85, 0
- Position: Wide receiver

Personal information
- Born: December 17, 1986 (age 39); Dayton, Ohio, U.S.
- Listed height: 6 ft 3 in (1.91 m)
- Listed weight: 199 lb (90 kg)

Career information
- High school: Wayne (Huber Heights, Ohio)
- College: Purdue
- NFL draft: 2009: undrafted

Career history
- Cincinnati Bengals (2009)*; Spokane Shock (2010–2011); Omaha Nighthawks (2011)*; Denver Broncos (2011)*; Omaha Nighthawks (2011); Arizona Rattlers (2011)*; Denver Broncos (2011–2013); New England Patriots (2013–2014)
- * Offseason or practice squad member only

Awards and highlights
- Super Bowl champion (XLIX); ArenaBowl champion (2010)

Career AFL statistics
- Receptions: 138
- Receiving yards: 1,792
- Receiving touchdowns: 39
- Stats at ArenaFan.com
- Stats at Pro Football Reference

Gregory Carlton Orton (born December 17, 1986) is an American former professional football player who was a wide receiver in the National Football League (NFL). He was signed by the Cincinnati Bengals as an undrafted free agent in 2009. He played college football for the Purdue Boilermakers.

He was also a member of the Spokane Shock, Denver Broncos, Omaha Nighthawks, Arizona Rattlers, and New England Patriots.

== Early life ==
Greg attended Wayne High School, where he was a standout football, basketball and track and field member. As a member of the football team, he played for coach Jay Minton. He was ranked as the No. 19 wide receiver in nation by SuperPrep as well as the No. 53 wide receiver in nation and the No. 21 player in Ohio by Rivals.com. He was a first-team all-state selection as senior, when he caught 65 passes for 1,058 yards (16.3 average) and nine touchdowns. As a result, he was named to CBS SportsLine All-Regional team. He had 59 receptions for 782 yards (13.3 average) and 11 touchdowns his junior season, and was a two-time all-area and all-conference honoree.

College recruiting
| Name | Hometown | School | Height | Weight | 40^{‡} | Commit date |
|---|---|---|---|---|---|---|
| Greg Orton; WR | Huber Heights, Ohio | Wayne High School | 6 ft 4 in (1.93 m) | 190 lb (86 kg) | 4.49 | Sep 22, 2004 |
| Greg Orton; WR | Recruit ratings: Scout: Rivals: | | | | | |
Overall recruit ranking: Scout: 21 (WR) Rivals: 53 (WR), 21 (OH)
‡ Refers to 40-yard dash; Note: In many cases, Scout, Rivals, 247Sports, On3, and ESPN may conflict in their listings of height, weight and 40 time.; In these cases, the average was taken. ESPN grades are on a 100-point scale.; Sources: "2005 Team Ranking". Rivals.com.

Orton committed to Purdue University on September 22, 2004.

== College career ==
Orton chose Purdue to continue his football career. He chose Purdue over Cincinnati, Iowa, Michigan State, Pittsburgh, Virginia and Wisconsin. Orton saw his production steadily increase every season. He finished his Purdue career appearing in 50 games and recorded 203 receptions (fifth in school history) for 2,356 yards (sixth in school history) and 13 touchdowns.

=== Statistics ===
| Season | Team | GS | GP | Rec | Yds | Avg | TD | Long |
|---|---|---|---|---|---|---|---|---|
| 2005 | Purdue | 1 | 8 | 9 | 94 | 10.4 | 0 | 22 |
| 2006 | Purdue | 1 | 13 | 58 | 790 | 13.6 | 5 | 43 |
| 2007 | Purdue | 11 | 14 | 67 | 752 | 11.2 | 3 | 44 |
| 2008 | Purdue | 12 | 12 | 69 | 720 | 10.4 | 5 | 43 |
| | Totals | 27 | 46 | 203 | 2,356 | 11.6 | 13 | 44 |

== Professional career ==
=== Cincinnati Bengals ===
In 2009, Orton signed as an undrafted free agent with the Cincinnati Bengals, after failing to have his name called in the 2009 NFL draft.

=== Spokane Shock ===
In 2010, Orton signed to play with the Spokane Shock of the Arena Football League (AFL). He appeared in a few games making 18 receptions for 2 touchdowns, helping guide the Shock to an ArenaBowl XXIII championship. In 2011, he saw his number increase dramatically, but the Shock season wasn't as productive. As a member of the Shock, Orton led the team in receptions (120), receiving yards (1,588), and touchdowns (37).

=== Omaha Nighthawks (first stint) ===
In August 2011, he signed with the Omaha Nighthawks of the United Football League.

=== Denver Broncos (first stint) ===
On August 13, 2011, Orton signed with the Denver Broncos. He was later waived by the Broncos prior to the 2011 season.

=== Omaha Nighthawks (second stint) ===
Orton then returned to the Nighthawks and played in four games during the 2011 UFL season, catching 12 passes for 192 yards.

=== Arizona Rattlers ===
In early November 2011, Orton signed with the Arizona Rattlers to play the 2012 AFL season.

=== Denver Broncos (second stint) ===
Orton was re-signed by the Broncos, as a member of the practice squad on November 29, 2011. He spent the 2012 season on the practice squad as well.

He was waived/injured by the Broncos on August 25, 2013. He reverted to injured reserve on August 27. He was released by the Broncos on October 7, 2013.

=== New England Patriots ===
Orton was signed by the New England Patriots to their practice squad on December 31, 2013. The team released him on May 22, 2014, but re-signed him on July 23 of that year. Orton was waived/injured by the Patriots on July 27, 2014. He reverted to injured reserve on July 28. He won Super Bowl XLIX with the Patriots after they defeated the defending champion Seattle Seahawks 28–24. He became a free agent after the 2014 season.
