= Dorien Bryant =

American football player (born 1985)

No. 9
- Position: Wide receiver

Personal information
- Born: March 19, 1985 (age 41); Swedesboro, New Jersey, U.S.
- Listed height: 5 ft 10 in (1.78 m)
- Listed weight: 175 lb (79 kg)

Career information
- High school: Fork Union (VA) Military Academy
- College: Purdue
- NFL draft: 2008: undrafted

Career history
- Pittsburgh Steelers (2008)*
- * Offseason or practice squad member only

Awards and highlights
- First-team All-Big Ten (2006); 2× Second-team All-Big Ten (2005, 2007); 2008 Senior Bowl; Purdue record 6,219 AP yards

Dorien Lamar Bryant (born March 19, 1985) is an American former professional football wide receiver. He went undrafted in the 2008 NFL draft, but later signed with the Pittsburgh Steelers as a free agent.

Bryant placed claim to 23 school and Big Ten Conference records during his time with the Boilermakers. Bryant attended Kingsway Regional High School, where he was ranked as ninth-best wide receiver and 75th-best player in the nation by Rivals.com. Bryant signed a letter of intent to attend Boston College in 2003. But he failed to qualify academically and spent the season at Fork Union Military Academy. He caught 30 passes that year, including nine touchdowns.

He then enrolled at Purdue in 2004, and caught 38 passes for 584 yards and three touchdowns, adding 85 yards on seven carries with a score. He totaled 829 all-purpose yards. In 2005, Bryant received second-team sophomore All-American honors from College Football News. He was selected College Offensive Player of the Year by the Touchdown Club of Southern New Jersey. He also led the Big Ten Conference and ranked eighth nationally with an average of 7.3 receptions per game and ranked second in the Big Ten and 30th nationally with 87.3 receiving yards per game. That season, Bryant led the team with 80 receptions for 960 yards and four touchdowns. He rushed 21 times for 101 yards and three scores, adding 500 yards and a touchdown on 21 kickoff returns. His 1,561 all-purpose yards rank eighth on the school's single-season list. As a junior, He earned first-team All-Big Ten Conference honors from the media and led the league with 6.2 receptions and 76.3 receiving yards per game, while finishing fourth with 122.0 all-purpose yards per game. His 87 receptions rank fourth on the school record list and eighth in Big Ten history, as his 1,068 yards receiving rank seventh on the Boilermaker annual record chart. He had six touchdown catches, 150 yards and two scores on 19 carries and returned 25 kickoffs for 490 yards. His 1,708 all-purpose yards rank fifth in school history. In 2007, Bryant again received All-Big Ten Conference recognition. He led the league and ranked eighth nationally with 7.27 receptions and finished second in the Big Ten with an average of 87.27 yards receiving per game. He set the school record with 2,121 all-purpose yards, as he matched his career high with 87 receptions, good for 936 yards and eight scores. He had 14 carries for 85 yards, 15 punt returns for 93 yards and set the Big Ten record with 1,007 yards on 36 kickoff returns with two scores.

In 50 games at Purdue, Bryant started 36 contests as a slot receiver. He ranks second in school history with 292 receptions, third with 3,548 yards receiving and tied for fifth with 21 touchdown grabs. He gained 421 yards with six scores on 61 carries and totaled 125 yards on 22 punt returns. His 88 kickoff returns rank fifth in Big Ten history and his 2,125 yards set the school record and ranks third in conference history, scoring three times. His 6,219 all-purpose yards set the Purdue all-time record and rank fourth in Big Ten history and 16th in NCAA FBS history.

Bryant is now openly gay and has talked about his experience as an athlete trying to hide his sexuality.

== Early life ==
Bryant attended Kingsway Regional High School in Woolwich Township, New Jersey. There he participated in football, basketball and track and field. For football he played for coach Tony Barchuk. As a senior tailback/wide receiver, he earned SuperPrep All-America honors, while also gaining All-America accolades from Tom Lemming, after he rushed for 1,248 yards and 20 touchdowns. As a junior, he ran for 1,200 yards and 18 touchdowns on 111 carries, while also making 35 receptions for 500 yards and seven touchdowns while leading Kingsway to the 2001 South Jersey Group 2 title. After high school Bryant signed a letter of intent to Boston College in the same recruiting class that landed Matt Ryan, but he failed to qualify academically, so he went to Fork Union Military Academy for a prep year before he could re-enter college recruiting pools.

College recruiting
Name	Hometown	School	Height	Weight	40^{‡}	Commit date
Dorien Bryant; WR	Swedesboro, New Jersey	Fork Union Military Academy	5 ft 10 in (1.78 m)	155 lb (70 kg)	4.4	Feb 4, 2004
Dorien Bryant; WR	Recruit ratings: Scout: Rivals:					
Overall recruit ranking: Scout: 41 (WR) Rivals: -- (WR), -- (VA)
‡ Refers to 40-yard dash; Note: In many cases, Scout, Rivals, 247Sports, On3, and ESPN may conflict in their listings of height, weight and 40 time.; In these cases, the average was taken. ESPN grades are on a 100-point scale.; Sources: "2004 Team Ranking". Rivals.com.

Bryant committed to Purdue University on February 4, 2004. Bryant also had FBS scholarship offers from Boston College, Michigan State, NC State, Pittsburgh and Tennessee.

== College career ==
=== 2004 season ===
in 2004, starting two of 12 games at the slot receiver position. He snatched 38 passes for 584 yards (15.4-yard average) and three touchdowns, adding 85 yards on seven carries (12.1 avg) with a score. He totaled 829 all-purpose yards and recorded three tackles on special teams, averaging 21.3 yards on six kickoff returns and 4.6 yards on seven punt returns.

=== 2005 season ===
In 2005, Bryant received second-team sophomore All-American honors from College Football News. He was selected College Offensive Player of the Year by the Touchdown Club of Southern New Jersey, appearing in all 11 games, including nine starts at slot receiver. He led the Big Ten Conference and ranked eighth nationally with an average of 7.3 receptions per game and ranked second in the Big Ten and 30th nationally with 87.3 receiving yards per game. That season, Bryant led the team with 80 receptions for 960 yards (12-yard average) and four touchdowns. He rushed 21 times for 101 yards (4.8 avg) and three scores, adding 500 yards and a touchdown on 21 kickoff returns (23.8 avg) while posting two solo tackles. His 1,561 all-purpose yards rank eighth on the school's single-season list.

=== 2006 season ===
As a junior, Bryant started 13 games, coming off the bench vs. Maryland in the Champs Sports Bowl. He earned first-team All-Big Ten Conference honors from the media and led the league with 6.2 receptions and 76.3 receiving yards per game, while finishing fourth with 122.0 all-purpose yards per game. His 87 receptions rank fourth on the school record list and eighth in Big Ten history, as his 1,068 yards receiving (12.3-yard average) rank seventh on the Boilermaker annual record chart. He had six touchdown catches, 150 yards and two scores on 19 carries (7.9 avg) and returned 25 kickoffs for 490 yards (19.0 avg). His 1,708 all-purpose yards rank fifth in school history.

=== 2007 season ===
In 2007, Bryant again received All-Big Ten Conference recognition and was named Player of the Year by the Brooks Irvine Memorial Football Club of South Jersey and Touchdown Club of Southern New Jersey. He led the league and ranked eighth nationally with 7.27 receptions and finished second in the Big Ten with an average of 87.27 yards receiving per game. He set the school record with 2,121 all-purpose yards, as he matched his career high with 87 receptions, good for 936 yards (10.8-yard average) and eight scores. He had 14 carries for 85 yards (6.1 avg), 15 punt returns for 93 yards (6.2 avg) and set the Big Ten record with 1,007 yards on 36 kickoff returns (28.0 avg) with two scores. In 50 games at Purdue, Bryant started 36 contests as a slot receiver. He ranks second in school history with 292 receptions, third with 3,548 yards receiving (12.2-yard average) and is tied for fifth with 21 touchdown grabs. He gained 421 yards with six scores on 61 carries (6.9 avg) and totaled 125 yards on 22 punt returns (5.7 avg). His 88 kickoff returns rank fifth in Big Ten annals and his 2,125 yards set the school record and ranks third in conference history, scoring three times. His 6,219 all-purpose yards set the Purdue all-time record and rank fourth in Big Ten history and 16th in NCAA 1-A annals. Bryant is one of seven players in school history to record 100-plus yards in two statistical categories in the same game and one of two to accomplish the feat twice.

He also was on the Purdue track team in 2004-05. He finished first in the 200 meters at Gene Edmonds Cup with a clocking of 21.81. He was also a member of the 4x400 relay team (along with former football players Zach Logan and Ray Williams) that finished seventh at the Big Ten Indoor Championships with a time of 3:15.81.

=== Statistics ===
Season	Games		Receiving					Rushing			Kickoff returns					Punt returns				
Season	GP	GS	Rec	Yds	Avg	Lng	TD	Att	Yds	TD	Att	Yds	Avg	Lng	TD	Att	Yds	Avg	Lng	TD
2004	12	2	38	584	15.4	65	3	7	85	1	6	128	21.3	53	0	7	32	4.6	17	0
2005	11	9	80	960	12.0	44	4	21	101	3	21	500	23.8	95	1	0	0	0.0	0	0
2006	14	13	87	1,068	12.3	53	6	19	150	2	25	490	19.6	48	0	0	0	0.0	0	0
2007	13	13	87	936	10.8	53	8	14	85	0	36	1,007	28.0	98	2	15	93	6.2	35	0
Totals	50	37	292	3,548	12.2	65	21	61	421	6	88	2,125	24.1	98	3	22	125	5.6	35	0

== Professional career ==
Prior to the 2008 NFL draft, Bryant was projected to be drafted in the seventh round by NFLDraftScout.com and as high as the second round. He was rated as the thirty-first-best wide receiver in the draft.

Bryant was invited to the 2008 NFL Scouting Combine in Indianapolis, which started on February 20, along with teammates Dustin Keller, Cliff Avril and Stanford Keglar.

Pre-draft measurables
Height	Weight	Arm length	Hand span	40-yard dash	10-yard split	20-yard split	20-yard shuttle	Three-cone drill	Broad jump
5 ft 9.6 in (1.77 m)	174 lb (79 kg)	33 1/2	9 1/4	4.49 s	1.53 s	2.57 s	4.24 s	6.88 s	9 ft 11 in (3.02 m)
All values from 2008 NFL Scouting Combine

Bryant signed as undrafted free agent with the Pittsburgh Steelers. He was released in May 2008 due to a failed physical.

== Personal life ==
While at Purdue, Bryant was outed as gay by a male cheerleader after their relationship went south. Bryant denied that he was gay, but the experience and taunting he endured in a game against Indiana State, helped him realize he did not want to have to hide his sexuality for an entire pro career.
