= Torri Williams =

American football player (born 1986)

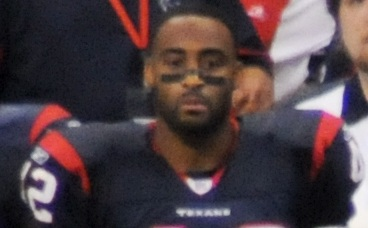
- Williams with the Houston Texans in 2010

No. 42, 28, 13
- Position: Safety

Personal information
- Born: August 29, 1986 (age 40); Dallas, Texas, U.S.
- Listed height: 6 ft 2 in (1.88 m)
- Listed weight: 208 lb (94 kg)

Career information
- High school: Leander (Leander, Texas)
- College: Purdue
- NFL draft: 2010: undrafted

Career history
- Houston Texans (2010–2011); Virginia Destroyers (2012); BC Lions (2014)

Career NFL statistics
- Games played: 1
- Stats at Pro Football Reference

Career CFL statistics
- Total tackles: 25
- Sacks: 1
- Interceptions: 1
- Stats at CFL.ca (archived)

Torri Sherrod Williams (born August 29, 1986) is an American former professional football player who was a safety in the National Football League (NFL) and Canadian Football League (CFL). He was signed by the Houston Texans as an undrafted free agent in 2010. He played college football for the Purdue Boilermakers.

== Early life ==
Williams was a four-year letterman at Leander High School in Leander, Texas. He was ranked as No. 51 wide receiver in nation by Rivals.com. As a senior, he received an All-Central Texas and unanimous first-team all-district selection after catching 79 passes for 1,841 yards (23.3 average) and 14 touchdowns. He came up with four interceptions, played on three district championship team, and was coached by Steve Gideon.

== College career ==
Williams played at Purdue University for the Boilermakers in the 2004, 2006, 2007, 2008, and 2009 seasons.

== Professional career ==
=== Houston Texans ===
Williams signed with the Houston Texans on May 7, 2010 after going undrafted in the 2010 NFL draft. He was waived on September 4, 2010 and signed to the team's practice squad on September 6. He was promoted to the active roster on November 13 and played in one game for the Texans during the 2010 season but recorded no statistics. Williams was placed on injured reserve on December 1, 2010. He was waived on September 3, 2011 and re-signed to the practice on October 19, 2011. He signed a reserve/future contract with the Texans on January 16, 2012. The Texans waived Williams on August 27, 2012.

=== Virginia Destroyers ===
Williams then signed with the Virginia Destroyers of the United Football League and made six tackles during the 2012 season.

=== BC Lions ===
Williams played in 16 games, starting four, for the BC Lions of the Canadian Football League in 2014, recording 25 tackles on defense, 10 special teams tackles, one interception, two pass breakups, one sack, one forced fumble and two fumble recoveries. He was released by the Lions on June 14, 2015.
