= 2007 Motor City Bowl =

Purdue Boilermakers	Central Michigan Chippewas
(7–5)	(8–5)
Big Ten	MAC
51	48
Head coach: Joe Tiller	Head coach: Butch Jones
	1	2	3	4	Total
Purdue	21	13	7	10	51
Central Michigan	6	7	28	7	48
- Date: December 26, 2007
- Season: 2007
- Stadium: Ford Field
- Location: Detroit, Michigan
- MVP: Curtis Painter (Purdue)
- Favorite: Purdue by 8½
- Referee: Brad Allen (ACC)
- Attendance: 60,624
- Payout: US$750,000 per team

United States TV coverage
- Network: ESPN
- Announcers: Dave Pasch, Andre Ware, and Quint Kessenich

The 2007 Motor City Bowl, part of the 2007-08 NCAA football bowl games season, occurred on December 26, 2007 at Ford Field in Detroit, Michigan, United States.

The Central Michigan Chippewas, who won their second straight Mid-American Conference championship on the same field on December 1, returned to take on the Purdue Boilermakers, whom bowl officials invited from the Big Ten Conference. The bowl was a rematch of a game played on September 15 in West Lafayette, Indiana. The Boilermakers won that game, 45–22. CMU had defeated Middle Tennessee in the 2006 game.

Purdue dominated the first half of the game, scoring 3 touchdowns in the first quarter to Central's 2 field goals, and by halftime they had assured a 21-point lead over the Chippewas. Central came back in the third quarter, scoring 4 touchdowns to tie the game. The final score was 51–48, with Purdue kicker Chris Summers kicking a game-winning field goal as time expired. Purdue quarterback Curtis Painter threw for 543 pass yards, setting a Motor City Bowl record and placing him fourth on the list of all-time bowl game performances. His total broke the Purdue school record.

The attendance of 60,624 broke the Motor City Bowl record, which had been set in 2006 by Central Michigan and Middle Tennessee (54,113).

== See also ==
- List of college football post-season games that were rematches of regular season games
