= Brandon King (cornerback) =

American football player (born 1987)

No. 37, 41
- Position: Cornerback

Personal information
- Born: January 28, 1987 (age 39); Warner Robins, Georgia, U.S.
- Listed height: 5 ft 10 in (1.78 m)
- Listed weight: 185 lb (84 kg)

Career information
- High school: Houston County (Warner Robins)
- College: Purdue
- NFL draft: 2010: undrafted

Career history
- Indianapolis Colts (2010); Miami Dolphins (2011)*; Indianapolis Colts (2011−2012); Jacksonville Jaguars (2012)*; Detroit Lions (2013)*
- * Offseason or practice squad member only

Awards and highlights
- Second-team All-Big Ten (2009)

Career NFL statistics
- Total tackles: 23
- Stats at Pro Football Reference

Brandon Marico King (born January 28, 1987) is an American former professional football player who was a cornerback in the National Football League (NFL). He played college football for the Purdue Boilermakers and was signed by the Indianapolis Colts as an undrafted free agent in 2010.

He was also a member of the Miami Dolphins, Jacksonville Jaguars and Detroit Lions.

== Professional career ==
=== Indianapolis Colts ===
After going undrafted in the 2010 NFL draft, King signed as a free agent with the Indianapolis Colts on April 30, 2010. He played in 4 games before being placed on injured reserve on October 20, 2010. He was waived on September 3, 2011.

=== Miami Dolphins ===
On September 13, 2011, he was signed to the Miami Dolphins' practice squad.

=== Indianapolis Colts ===
He signed back with the Colts on December 6, 2011 and played in four games for the Colts in 2011.

=== Jacksonville Jaguars ===
King was signed to the Jacksonville Jaguars' practice squad on November 15, 2012. He was signed to the active roster at the conclusion of the 2012 season. He was released on February 27, 2013.

=== Detroit Lions ===
On August 5, 2013, King was signed by the Detroit Lions. On August 13, 2013, he was released by the Lions.
