= Anthony Heygood =

American gridiron football player (born 1986)

No. 53
- Position: Linebacker

Personal information
- Born: April 3, 1986 (age 40); Chester, Pennsylvania, U.S.
- Listed height: 6 ft 1 in (1.85 m)
- Listed weight: 232 lb (105 kg)

Career information
- High school: Cardinal O'Hara (Springfield, Pennsylvania)
- College: Purdue
- NFL draft: 2009: undrafted

Career history
- Carolina Panthers (2009)*; Seattle Seahawks (2009–2010); Saskatchewan Roughriders (2013)*
- * Offseason or practice squad member only

Anthony Deron Heygood (born April 3, 1986) is an American former professional football linebacker. He was signed by the Carolina Panthers of the National Football League (NFL) as an undrafted free agent in 2009. He played college football for the Purdue Boilermakers.

He was also a member of the Seattle Seahawks of the NFL and the Saskatchewan Roughriders of the Canadian Football League (CFL).

== Early life ==
Heygood attended Cardinal O'Hara High School in Springfield, Pennsylvania.

College recruiting
Name	Hometown	School	Height	Weight	40^{‡}	Commit date
Anthony Heygood; RB	Metamora, Illinois	Metamora Township High School	6 ft 2 in (1.88 m)	210 lb (95 kg)	4.495	Feb 4, 2004
Anthony Heygood; RB	Recruit ratings: Scout: Rivals:					
Overall recruit ranking: Scout: 43 (RB) Rivals: 20 (RB), 15 (PA)
Note: In many cases, Scout, Rivals, 247Sports, On3, and ESPN may conflict in their listings of height and weight.; In these cases, the average was taken. ESPN grades are on a 100-point scale.; Sources: "Purdue Football Commitment List (28)". Rivals.; "Purdue College Football Recruiting Commits". Scout.; "Scout.com Team Recruiting Rankings". Scout.; "2004 Team Ranking". Rivals.com.

Heygood committed to Purdue University on February 4, 2004. Heygood was heavily recruited, landing FBS scholarships from Boston College, Notre Dame, Purdue Syracuse, West Virginia and Wisconsin.

== College career ==
Heygood majored in health and fitness at Purdue.

== Professional career ==
=== Carolina Panthers ===
After going undrafted in the 2009 NFL draft, Heygood was signed by the Carolina Panthers on May 1, 2009, as an undrafted free agent. He waived on September 5, 2009.

=== Seattle Seahawks ===
Heygood was signed by the Seattle Seahawks on January 6, 2010. He was later released by the team on July 29, 2010, only to be re-signed five days later on August 4. He was placed on injured reserve on August 6, 2010. On July 30, 2011, he was waived by Seattle.

=== Saskatchewan Roughriders ===
In May 2013, Heygood signed with the Saskatchewan Roughriders. Heygood was cut on June 18, 2013.
