= Chris Summers (kicker) =

American football player (born 1988)

No. 13
- Position: Placekicker / Punter

Personal information
- Born: February 29, 1988 (age 38); Fishers, Indiana, U.S.
- Listed height: 6 ft 1 in (1.85 m)
- Listed weight: 185 lb (84 kg)

Career information
- High school: Hamilton Southeastern (Fishers)
- College: Purdue (2006–2008)
- Stats at ESPN

Christopher Clay Summers (born February 29, 1988, in Fishers, Indiana) is an American former football placekicker and punter for Purdue University. He played for the Boilermakers from 2006 to 2009.

An Indiana native, Summers played high school football at Hamilton Southeastern High School in Fishers, Indiana. He received The Indianapolis Star Mr. Football position award as a placekicker in 2005.

Summers enrolled at Purdue in 2006. During the 2006, 2007, and 2008 seasons, he successfully converted 111 consecutive extra-point attempts. Summer's streak was the third longest in Big Ten Conference history and established a Purdue program record. He was also Purdue's leading scorer in 2007 with 110 points. His 110 points in 2007, including 18 field goals in 22 attempts, was the third highest single-season point total in Purdue program history. In the 2007 Motor City Bowl, Summers kicked a game-winning field goal as time expired.
