= Stanford Keglar =

American football player (born 1985)

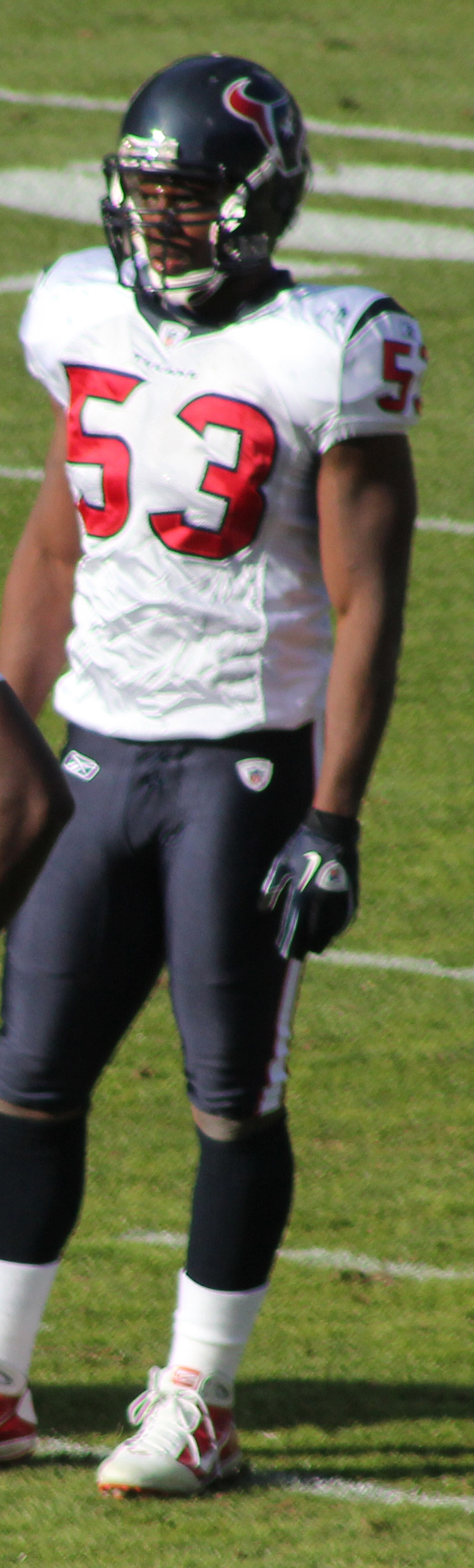
- Keglar with the Houston Texans in 2010

No. 59, 53, 57
- Position: Linebacker

Personal information
- Born: July 4, 1985 (age 41); Indianapolis, Indiana, U.S.
- Listed height: 6 ft 2 in (1.88 m)
- Listed weight: 250 lb (113 kg)

Career information
- High school: Pike (Indianapolis)
- College: Purdue
- NFL draft: 2008: 4th round, 134th overall pick

Career history
- Tennessee Titans (2008−2009); Houston Texans (2010); Las Vegas Locomotives (2012); Minnesota Vikings (2013)*
- * Offseason or practice squad member only

Career NFL statistics
- Total tackles: 22
- Stats at Pro Football Reference

Stanford Sherock Keglar (born July 4, 1985) is an American former professional football player who was a linebacker in the National Football League (NFL). He was selected by the Tennessee Titans in the fourth round of the 2008 NFL draft. He played college football for the Purdue Boilermakers.

== Early life ==
Stanford Sherock Keglar was born on July 4, 1985, in Indianapolis, Indiana. Playing at Pike High School in Indianapolis, Indiana, he was coached by former Purdue defensive back Ken Coudret. As a junior, he had 72 tackles, four sacks, four fumble recoveries and one interception. During his senior season, Keglar totaled 83 tackles, five sacks, two forced fumbles, two fumble recoveries and one interception. After the season, he was named honorable mention All-State, First-team All County and First-team All-Conference. He was ranked as the eighth best college football prospect in Indiana and the 26th best linebacker by Rivals.com. During his high school years he also participated in track & field as well as swimming and was sectional winner in the 50 freestyle.

== College career ==
=== 2003 ===
Keglar played in only one game as a freshman at Purdue University before suffering a high ankle sprain and missing the rest of the season.

=== 2004 ===
During his sophomore year, he started all 12 games for the Boilermakers. He recorded 61 tackles, three pass breakups, and one forced fumble. Against Notre Dame he had a career high seven tackles.

=== 2005 ===
As a junior, Keglar appeared in 10 games, starting six. He ranked fourth on the team with 50 tackles and added one sack and a pass breakup. On September 17 against Arizona he equaled his career high with seven tackles.

=== 2006 ===
Appearing in all 14 games and starting 10 as a senior at Purdue, Keglar had 69 tackles, five pass breakups, one interception, one forced fumble and a fumble recovery. Keglar broke his career high in tackles with 10 against Ball State. He had a team high nine tackles in the Champs Sports Bowl against Maryland.

== Professional career ==
=== Tennessee Titans ===
Keglar was selected by the Tennessee Titans in the fourth round of the 2008 NFL draft with the 134th overall pick. He was signed on July 15, 2008. In 13 games as a rookie he totaled 12 tackles. On September 5, 2010, Keglar was waived by the Titans.

=== Houston Texans ===
Keglar signed with the Houston Texans on October 25, 2010. He was cut on September 3, 2011.

=== Las Vegas Locomotive ===
Keglar played in three games with the Las Vegas Locomotives of the United Football League in 2012.

=== Minnesota Vikings ===
Keglar was signed by the Minnesota Vikings on May 29, 2013. He was cut on June 27, 2013. The Vikings re-signed Keglar again on August 6, 2013, after cutting Nathan Williams. Keglar was again released by the Vikings on August 26, 2013 (along with 12 others) to get to a 75-man roster.

== Personal life ==
Following his NFL career, Keglar has worked in various professions, such as a promoter, in the Las Vegas Metropolitan Area.
