= Dustin Keller =

American football player (born 1984)

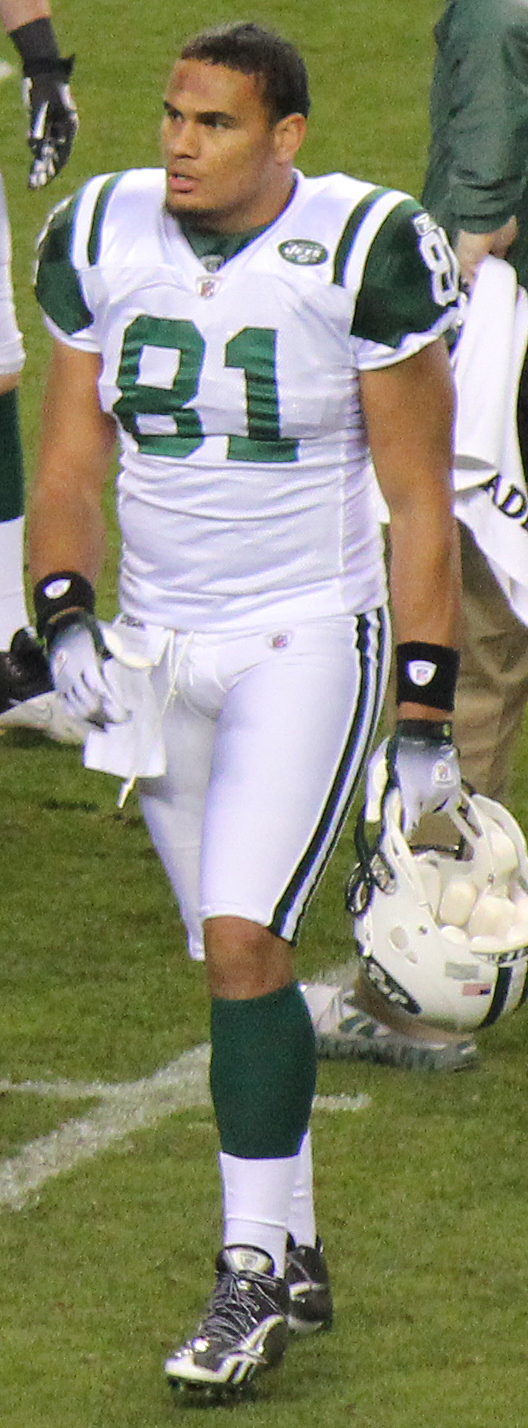
- Keller with the New York Jets in 2011

No. 81
- Position: Tight end

Personal information
- Born: September 25, 1984 (age 42); Lafayette, Indiana, U.S.
- Listed height: 6 ft 2 in (1.88 m)
- Listed weight: 255 lb (116 kg)

Career information
- High school: Jefferson (Lafayette)
- College: Purdue (2003–2007)
- NFL draft: 2008: 1st round, 30th overall pick

Career history
- New York Jets (2008–2012); Miami Dolphins (2013)

Awards and highlights
- Second-team All-Big Ten (2007)

Career NFL statistics
- Receptions: 241
- Receiving yards: 2,876
- Receiving touchdowns: 17
- Stats at Pro Football Reference

Dustin Kendall Keller (born September 25, 1984) is an American former professional football player who was a tight end in the National Football League (NFL). He was selected by the New York Jets in the first round of the 2008 NFL draft. He played college football for the Purdue Boilermakers.

Keller was also a member of the Miami Dolphins.

== Early life ==
Dustin played high school football at Jefferson High School in Lafayette, Indiana. While at Jefferson, Dustin was a three-sport standout in football, basketball, and track. During his senior year at Lafayette Jefferson High School he was the state's leading wide receiver in football with 114 receptions in 2002, was second-team All-State as a small forward in basketball, and he was the high jump state champion in Indiana, clearing 6 ft 9 in in a steady rain after coming second to the Philadelphia 76ers' Rodney Carney with a jump of 6'10". Keller was named one of top 50 receivers in nation by Street & Smith's and first-team all-state as senior after setting state records with 113 receptions and 1,804 yards (16.0 average) with 22 touchdowns. He was a finalist for Mr. Football.

Keller was expected to sign with the University of Toledo and had actually verbally committed. Purdue's then-head coach Joe Tiller went to Keller's high school to attain Keller's cell phone number. Tiller called Keller shortly after and scheduled a meeting in Tiller's office. Tiller offered Purdue's last scholarship. Being Dustin's hometown school, Keller chose Purdue over Toledo.

During his freshman year at Purdue, Keller red-shirted and switched from wide receiver to tight end. After a year of watching, learning, and getting stronger, Dustin began to display his strength and athleticism. After two touchdowns in his redshirt freshman year, including a game-winning touchdown against powerhouse Ohio State, Keller earned the full-time starting job in his redshirt sophomore year. Keller's production increased each season, so much so, that his senior season at Purdue he was voted Most Valuable Offensive Player in the Motor City Bowl. In addition, his teammates voted him Purdue's Most Valuable Player that same season.

== Professional career ==
=== Pre-draft ===
Keller was nothing short of electrifying at the 2008 NFL Combine. He placed first in four out of the seven events and second in two of the seven. This performance dramatically improved his draft position.

Pre-draft measurables
Height	Weight	40-yard dash	10-yard split	20-yard split	20-yard shuttle	Three-cone drill	Vertical jump	Broad jump	Bench press
6 ft 2 in (1.88 m)	242 lb (110 kg)	4.53 s	1.62 s	2.65 s	4.14 s	6.88 s	38.5 in (0.98 m)	10 ft 11 in (3.33 m)	26 reps

=== New York Jets ===
Keller was selected by the New York Jets in the first round with the 30th overall pick in the 2008 NFL draft. On July 18, 2008, he signed a 5-year 12 million dollar contract with the Jets. Keller was slowly phased into the offense alongside the veteran quarterback Brett Favre. Keller finished a strong rookie season with 48 receptions, 535 yards and 3 touchdowns.

In his second season, 2009, Keller finished with 2 touchdowns and 522 yards on 45 receptions.

Keller led the Jets in receptions (55) in 2010. In 2011, he again led the Jets in receptions (65) for 815 yards and 5 touchdowns.

After not missing a game or a practice in his first four years in the NFL, a pulled groin and high ankle sprain hindered Keller's production in the 2012 regular season, limiting him to 28 receptions for 317 yards and two touchdowns in only 8 games.

=== Miami Dolphins ===
Keller signed with the Miami Dolphins on March 15, 2013. On August 17, Keller suffered a career-ending knee injury in a preseason game against the Texans, tearing his ACL, MCL, and PCL, and also dislocating his knee. On August 20, the Dolphins placed Keller on injured reserve.

=== Professional statistics ===
Year	Team	G	GS	Rec	Yards	AVG	Lng	TD
2008	NYJ	16	6	48	535	11.1	54	3
2009	NYJ	16	12	45	522	11.6	40	2
2010	NYJ	16	13	55	687	12.5	41	5
2011	NYJ	16	12	65	815	12.5	41	5
2012	NYJ	8	5	28	317	11.3	32	2
Total		72	48	241	2876	11.9	54	17
