= Purdue Boilermakers football =

Football team of Purdue University in Indiana, US

2026 Purdue Boilermakers football team
- First season: 1887; 139 years ago
- Athletic director: Tommy McClelland
- General manager: Brandon Lee
- Head coach: Barry Odom; 2nd season, 5–14 (.263)
- Location: West Lafayette, Indiana
- Stadium: Ross–Ade Stadium (capacity: 61,441)
- NCAA division: Division I FBS
- Conference: Big Ten
- Colors: Old gold and black
- All-time record: 648–621–48 (.510)
- Bowl record: 11–10 (.524)

National championships
- Unclaimed: 1931

Conference championships
- IIAA: 1891, 1892, 1893, 1894 Big Ten: 1918, 1929, 1931, 1932, 1943, 1952, 1967, 2000

Division championships
- Big Ten West: 2022
- Consensus All-Americans: 22
- Rivalries: Indiana (rivalry); Notre Dame (rivalry); Illinois (rivalry); Chicago (historic rivalry)

Uniforms
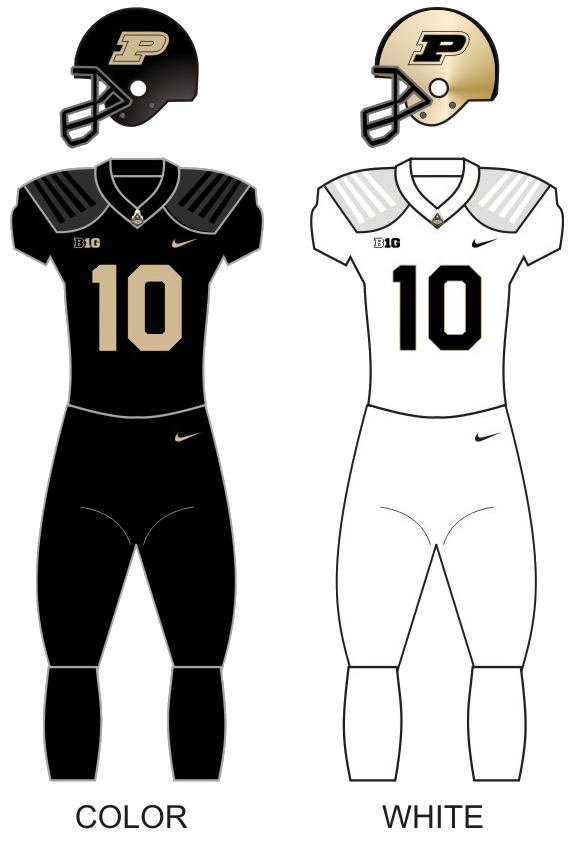
- Fight song: Hail Purdue!
- Mascot: Boilermaker Special; Purdue Pete
- Marching band: Purdue All-American Marching Band
- Outfitter: Nike
- Website: PurdueSports.com

The Purdue Boilermakers football team represents Purdue University in the NCAA Football Bowl Subdivision (FBS) of college football. Purdue plays its home games at Ross–Ade Stadium on the campus of Purdue University in West Lafayette, Indiana. The head coach of Purdue is Barry Odom, the 38th head coach in Purdue history. The Boilermakers compete in the Big Ten Conference.

With a 644–618–48 record at the conclusion of the 2025 season, Purdue has the 59th-most victories. Purdue was originally classified as a Major College school in the 1937 season until 1972. Purdue received Division I classification in 1973, becoming a Division I-A program from 1978 to 2006 and an FBS program from 2006 to the present. The Boilermakers have registered 64 winning seasons in their history, with 19 of those seasons resulting in eight victories or more, 10 seasons resulting in at least nine wins, and one season with ten victories or more. Of those successful campaigns, Purdue has produced five unbeaten seasons in its history, going 4–0 in 1891, 8–0 in 1892, 8–0 in 1929, 7–0–1 in 1932 and 9–0 in 1943. The Boilermakers have won a total of 12 conference championships in their history; eight Big Ten Conference titles; four Indiana Intercollegiate Athletic Association titles and one Big Ten West Division title.

== History ==
=== Early history (1887–1955) ===
The Purdue University football team traces its origin back to October 29, 1887, when its team fell to Butler College by a score of 48–6 in Indianapolis, Indiana. A group of students at Purdue University formed the school's first football team in 1887. Albert Berg was hired as the coach. Despite being deaf, Berg was reportedly "the only man in the territory with any knowledge of the game." Berg was 23 years old when he became Purdue's football "coacher." He was paid $1 for each lesson he gave to the newly organized football team and had only one week to prepare the team for its first game. The 1887 Purdue team played its only game on October 29, 1887, against the Butler College team at Athletic Park in Indianapolis. Butler soundly defeated Berg's squad by a score of 48–6. After the loss to Butler, Purdue did not field a football team again until 1889.

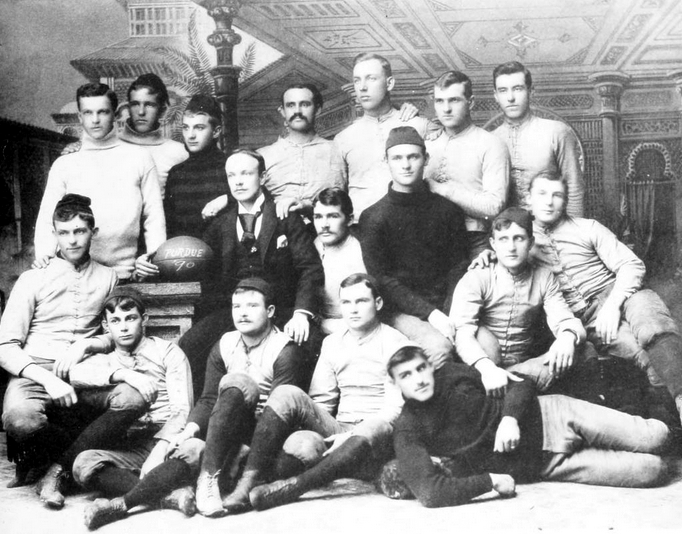
Purdue's 1890 football team

In 1890, Clinton L. Hare became the third head football coach at Purdue. He coached the team that season to a record of 3–3. Purdue won each of its two home games in convincing fashion, shutting out Wabash, 54–0, on October 24 and Illinois, 62–0, on November 22. They also shut out DePauw in Greencastle, Indiana, 32–0. Purdue suffered its worst loss of the season on November 1 in Ann Arbor, falling to Michigan by a score of 34–6. Hare's squad also dropped their season opener in Chicago on October 18 to the Chicago University Football Club, 10–6, and their season finale on November 27 against Hare's former team, Butler, by a score of 12–10. With their wins over DePauw and Wabash and their loss to Butler, Purdue tallied a 2–1 mark against their opponents from within the state of Indiana. Hare's team finished second place in the Indiana Intercollegiate Athletic Association to Butler, who beat all three of their in-state foes and was awarded the state championship. In 1891, Knowlton Ames became the head coach for Purdue, where he led the Boilermakers to a 12–0 record over two years. In the fall of 1893, D. M. Balliet became the head football coach at Purdue. Balliet led the team to a 5–2–1 record in 1893 and 9–1 in 1894. During the 1894 season, Balliet's Purdue squad defeated Amos Alonzo Stagg's Chicago Maroons and outscored opponents by a collective score of 177–42. His 1895 squad finished with a record of 4–3. In 1897, Balliet was reported to have given up a successful law practice to join the Klondike Gold Rush in Alaska. Balliet was re-hired as the head coach at Purdue in September 1901. He led the 1901 Purdue team to a 4–4–1 record but finished the season with consecutive losses to Notre Dame, Illinois, and Northwestern. At the end of the 1901 season, Purdue opted not to renew his services. In March 1902, the Indianapolis News reported, "He is known to be a good coach, but he turned out a loser last year and Purdue wants a change." In four seasons as Purdue's head coach, Balliet compiled a record of 22–10–2. On October 31, 1903, 14 members of the 1903 squad were killed in Indianapolis, Indiana when the train they were riding collided with a coal train. The event became known as the Purdue Wreck. Purdue bounced around with many different head coaches until 1921, with most having little to no success coaching at Purdue. However, Purdue did hire Andy Smith (1913–15) and William Henry Dietz (1921), both of which would go on to become College Football Hall of Fame members.

For the 1922 season, Purdue hired Missouri Tigers football coach, James Phelan. Phelan lead the 1929 Boilermakers to a perfect 8–0 record and what is to date their only ever outright Big Ten Title. In 1925, Noble Kizer became an assistant coach at Purdue under Phelan and inherited the head coaching position upon Phelan's departure for the University of Washington. Mal Elward became head coach after serving as an assistant at Purdue from 1927 to 1936. He compiled a 16–18–6 record at Purdue. Elmer Burnham served as Purdue's freshman football coach for seven years before assuming the role as varsity head coach in 1942. Burnham's 1943 squad went 9–0 and shared the Big Ten Conference title with Michigan. The 1943 squad was the only undefeated team playing a full schedule in major college football, but finished third in the country per the AP Poll. This would seemingly be sufficient grounds for Purdue to claim a 1943 National Championship as the NCAA itself did not recognize champions in the era. However, Purdue has never pursued this claim. Cecil Isbell started out at Purdue as an assistant coach and took over as head coach in 1944. He coached there for three years with a 14–14–1 record. He was the first Purdue alumnus to become the head football coach.

During Stu Holcomb's tenure as Boilermakers head coach he compiled a record of 35–42–4. His best year was 1952 when he led the Boilermakers to a Big Ten Conference co-championship and a No. 18 ranking in the final poll. Despite having only a 4–3–1 overall record, Holcomb's team played well in conference with a 4–1–1 record. Holcomb's Purdue teams are, perhaps, best remembered for ending Notre Dame's 39-game unbeaten streak when his Boilermakers defeated the Irish, 28–14, in the second game of the 1950 season. Holcomb was known for developing solid quarterbacks including Bob DeMoss, Dale Samuels and Len Dawson. These players helped grow a strong tradition at Purdue of great quarterback play. On December 12, 1955, after his nine seasons at Purdue, Holcomb left Purdue to accept the athletic director position at the Northwestern University. Stu Holcomb oversaw the 1947 integration of Purdue's athletic teams after pressure from student led protests. It is hard to find any black athletes in the records before 1950 – where Herman Murray is first shown with the squad. Alongside Herman Murray, One of the most notable early black athletes is Lamar Lundy. Lundy was a two sport athlete who played center for the Purdue basketball team and defensive end for the football team. Lundy was extraordinary and achieved great deal of success during and after his collegiate years. He received the 1956 Purdue MVP award not even 10 years after athletic integration and received offers to play professional basketball and football after graduation. He ultimately chose football and played for the Los Angeles Rams from 1957 to 1969. Both Murray and Lundy were pioneers who paved the way for many young gentlemen.

=== Jack Mollenkopf era (1956–1969) ===
On January 2, 1967, Jack Mollenkopf coached the school's first appearance in the Rose Bowl, leading Purdue to a 14–13 victory over USC. Against Purdue's in-state rivals, Mollenkopf tallied an 11–2–1 record versus Indiana and a 10–4 mark against Notre Dame. From 1966 to 1969, a Purdue player finished in the top three in balloting for the Heisman Trophy: quarterback Bob Griese was second in 1966, halfback Leroy Keyes placed third in 1967 and second in 1968, and quarterback Mike Phipps finished as runner-up in 1969. Mollenkopf's inaugural season in 1956 was the only losing campaign of his tenure as head coach at Purdue. Mollenkopf is Purdue's all-time leader in Big Ten Conference wins (58) and conference winning percentage (.637). His 84 wins at Purdue placed him first on the school's all-time wins list until Joe Tiller passed him in 2008, and he ranks fourth in overall winning percentage (.670). Mollenkopf's Boilermakers were nationally ranked for 80 weeks, the most under any Purdue head coach, and captured the No. 1 spot the first five weeks of the 1968 season.

=== Bob DeMoss era (1970–1972) ===
Former Purdue player and assistant coach Bob DeMoss was promoted to head coach in 1970. DeMoss inherited a Purdue squad who was loaded at the running back position with Stan Brown, and Otis Armstrong, but the team struggled to find consistency out of its quarterback position. DeMoss resigned following the 1972 season, citing his desire to be with his family more as his reason for stepping down. DeMoss compiled a career college football record of 13–18.

=== Alex Agase era (1973–1976) ===
After nine seasons as the Northwestern coach, Alex Agase accepted an offer at the end of 1972 to become head football coach at Purdue, one of the two schools for which he played. Taking the job was "not an easy decision to make", he said at the time, because he was happy at Northwestern. Agase coached at Purdue through the 1976 season, but his team never posted a winning record in his years there. He was fired in early 1977 and took a job as athletic director at Eastern Michigan University in Ypsilanti, Michigan. He stayed in that job until 1982, when he unexpectedly resigned citing "personal reasons".

=== Jim Young era (1977–1981) ===
In December 1976, Purdue hired 41-year-old Jim Young away from Arizona. When Young arrived at Purdue, he named true freshman, Mark Herrmann as the team's starting quarterback, and the freshman lived up to expectations, throwing for 2,041 yards through the team's first eight games. Herrmann would break the NCAA record for passing yards (2,453) and passing touchdowns (18) for freshman. In 1978, Young would lead Purdue to a 9–2–1 record, and a victory over Georgia Tech in the 1978 Peach Bowl. Young was named the Big Ten's Coach of the Year, the first Boilermaker head coach to ever win the award. Throughout his career, Herrmann would break the Big Ten's all-time career passing yards (6,734) and passing touchdowns (48) before his senior season. After a disappointing 1981 season, Young resigned from his position as head coach at Purdue, citing his desire to concentrate on athletic administration.

=== Leon Burtnett era (1982–1986) ===
In November 1981, defensive coordinator Leon Burtnett was promoted as Purdue's 30th head football coach. During the 1984 campaign, Burtnett's team posted its best season, which the highlight of the year was beating No. 2 Ohio State 28–23. The 1984 squad's 7–4 record earned Burtnett the Big Ten's Coach of the Year Award. His success that year earned him a contract extension through 1990. Burtnett's teams didn't improve after 1984, and after a 3–8 season in 1986, Burtnett resigned as head coach.

=== Fred Akers era (1987–1990) ===
After Burtnett's dismissal, Purdue had verbally agreed to hire Ron Meyer as their next head coach. Prior to finalizing a deal with Purdue, the Indianapolis Colts called and offered Meyer a contract. Meyer accepted the Colts offer. After they were left in the cold by Meyer, Purdue hired former Texas head coach Fred Akers. The Akers hiring caused starting quarterback Jeff George to transfer due to the Akers running style offense as opposed to Burtnett's passing offense. Akers coached his teams to only 12 wins in four years.

=== Jim Colletto era (1991–1996) ===
Jim Colletto was named Purdue's head coach in December 1990, accepting the position while he was serving the offensive coordinator for Ohio State. Colletto came to Purdue with the goal of recruiting kids from the Chicago area, and keeping Purdue's quarterback tradition trending onward. During his introduction press conference, he stated that at practice field, he planned to install a small cemetery in which he would place a tombstone for every school Purdue upset or beat on the road. Colletto also provided up change on offense, as he brought his I formation with him from Ohio State. During his first season as head coach, the Boilermakers improved winning two more games than they had the year before, and freshman tailback Corey Rogers was named the Big Ten Freshman of the Year.

In 1992, Colletto lost Rogers to academic ineligibility, and was forced to use a new running back. The Rogers suspension opened the door for what would become Purdue's all-time leading rusher, Mike Alstott. In 1994, the Boilermakers got out to a 4–1–1 start, and were starting to gain national attention. With Rogers and Alstott leading the way out of the Purdue backfield, Purdue racked up 1,206 and 17 rushing touchdowns in 6 games. However Purdue stumbled down the stretch, finishing the season 0–4–1. Colletto resigned in November 1996.

=== Joe Tiller era (1997–2008) ===
Joe Tiller, Purdue's all-time leader in victories (87).

Joe Tiller was hired by Purdue in 1997. Tiller inherited a program that had only had two winning seasons in the previous 18 years. However, the Boilermakers made an immediate splash in the second game of his rookie season with a nationally televised upset of Notre Dame. Tiller would go on to lead the Boilermakers to ten bowl berths in 12 years, most notably the 2001 Rose Bowl. Prior to Tiller's arrival, Purdue had played in only five bowl games, most recently the 1984 Peach Bowl. On September 20, 2008, in a game versus Central Michigan, Tiller won his 85th game at Purdue to become the winningest coach in school history, topping the previous mark set by Jack Mollenkopf (1956–1969). Tiller's "basketball on grass" offense was well renowned for its ability to score and score effectively, befuddling opposing defenses. This was especially the case when Drew Brees ran the team from 1997 to 2000. Tiller's Purdue squads were shut out only once, by Penn State, in a 12–0 defeat at Ross–Ade Stadium on October 28, 2006.

Tiller was the first coach to use the spread offense in the Big Ten Conference, although many others have since brought their own version of the spread, including Jim Tressel at Ohio State, Randy Walker at Northwestern, Rich Rodriguez at Michigan, and Ron Zook at Illinois. Under Tiller and his spread offense, Purdue annually had one of the top offenses in the Big Ten.

=== Danny Hope era (2009–2012) ===
Beginning on approximately January 7, 2008, several media outlets reported that Danny Hope had been offered and accepted the head coaching position at Purdue where it was expected that he would replace coach Joe Tiller as part of a succession plan. During his previous stay at Purdue, Hope was the offensive line coach for Tiller. He is credited with building the offensive line that protected NFL quarterback Drew Brees and produced several NFL offensive linemen, including All-Pro Matt Light.

In his first game as head coach at Purdue in 2009, the Boilermakers won, 52–31, over Toledo. Purdue lost their next five games before upsetting No. 7 Ohio State, 26–18, at home on October 17. Later during the 2009 season, the Boilermakers won at Michigan for the first time since 1966 with a 38–36 come-from-behind win at The Big House on November 7. It was only the third time in program history that Purdue defeated Ohio State and Michigan in the same season. Hope's teams would miss out on bowl games in both the 2009 and 2010 seasons. However, the 2011 team was able record a 6–6 overall record and a 4–4 conference record, including a second win against Ohio State in 3 years. The team would end up going to the Little Caesars Pizza Bowl, where they defeated Western Michigan 37–32 to achieve Hope's first winning season at Purdue. Following the season, Burke extended Hope with a two-year contract extension.

The 2012 season was met with high expectations from fans, alumni, and Hope himself, who proclaimed that it would be his best team with many starters returning. Moreover, with both Ohio State and Penn State serving bowl bans that year, the Boilermakers had a strong opportunity to win the Leaders division title. However, after a 3–1 non-conference start, the team would then open Big Ten play with five straight losses. Although the Boilers would eventually win their final three games, including victories over archrivals IU and Illinois, and become bowl-eligible for the second straight year, athletic director Morgan Burke announced on November 25, 2012, that Hope would be fired. Wide receivers coach Patrick Higgins was named interim coach for the bowl game.

=== Darrell Hazell era (2013–2016) ===
On December 5, 2012, it was announced that Darrell Hazell would leave the Kent State Golden Flashes to become the head coach of the Boilermakers. The Boilermakers started the season with a 42–7 loss to the Cincinnati Bearcats at Nippert Stadium. The following week against Indiana State, Hazell won his first game at Purdue 20–14. After the Boilermakers started 1–2, and Rob Henry continuing to struggle in the team's 4th game, Danny Etling was thrust into a game with Purdue trailing 27–10 to Northern Illinois. Etling finished the game with 241 yards passing while throwing two touchdowns and two interceptions. During the ensuing week, Etling was named the starter for the Boilermakers. With Etling at quarterback, Hazell showed he was playing the 2013 season to gain experience for younger players. The Boilermakers finished the 2013 season 1–11, one of the worst seasons in Purdue history. The Boilermakers went 3–9 in 2014, 2–10 in 2015, and were 3–3 in 2016 when on October 16, 2016, Hazell was fired with a record of 9–33 with the Boilermakers, including 3–24 in conference play. He was replaced on an interim basis by wide receivers coach and recruiting coordinator Gerad Parker, who went 0–6 to end the season 3–9.

=== Jeff Brohm era (2017–2022) ===
On December 5, 2016, Purdue hired Jeff Brohm to become head coach of the football program. Brohm came from Western Kentucky, where he was 30–10 in 3 seasons as the team's head coach. Brohm brought instant success to Purdue, success that the program had not experienced since head coach Danny Hope. In their game against Michigan, Purdue sold out Ross Ade Stadium for the first time since 2008 in Joe Tiller's final game against Indiana. Brohm finished his first regular season with a 6–6 record, including the first victory over rival Indiana since 2012. Brohm also was able to earn a bowl berth for Purdue, their first since the 2012 season, where Purdue defeated Arizona in the Foster Farms Bowl, 38–35.

In Brohm's second season, Purdue enjoyed perhaps even higher success than their first season, even though the team started the year 0–3. Purdue would eventually finish 6–7, with a second consecutive bowl berth. Purdue defeated three ranked teams in 2018: No. 23 Boston College (30–13), No. 2 Ohio State (49–20), and No. 16 Iowa (38–36). Purdue suffered a lopsided 63–14 loss to Auburn in the Music City Bowl. In Brohm's third season, Purdue finished 4–8 and failed to achieve bowl eligibility. Purdue's season ended with a 44–41 loss in two overtimes to Indiana in the Old Oaken Bucket game. In Brohm's fifth season as head coach, Purdue finished the regular season with a record of 8–4, including two top 5 wins in number 2 Iowa (24–7) and number 5 (number 3 in CFP Ranking) Michigan State (40–29). Earning a berth back to the Music City Bowl, the Boilermakers beat Tennessee in overtime, 48–45, and ended the year with a 9–4 record. His 6th season lead to the team's first Big Ten West Champions, but they were defeated by #2 Michigan at the Big Ten Championship Game in Indianapolis. Purdue finished the regular season 8–4, with 2021–2022 as the first back-to-back 8–4 seasons or better since 1997–1998. Following the Big Ten Championship Game, Brohm would leave Purdue to become the head coach at his alma mater, Louisville. Offensive Coordinator Brian Brohm took over as the interim head coach for the Citrus Bowl, in which Purdue would fall to the LSU Tigers 7–63.

=== Ryan Walters era (2023–2024) ===
On December 13, 2022, Purdue announced that it was hiring Ryan Walters, the defensive coordinator at Illinois, to replace Brohm. Purdue was Walters' first head coaching position. In Walters' debut, the Boilermakers fell at home, 35–39, to the Fresno State Bulldogs on September 2, 2023. Purdue would go 4–8 (3–6 Big Ten) that season, tying for fourth in the Big Ten West. On heels of a 1–3 start to the 2024 season, Purdue fired offensive coordinator Graham Harrell. Pressure was mounting that Walters himself should be fired due to the team's historic poor performance throughout the season. After a 66–0 blowout loss to arch rival Indiana on November 30, Walters and most of the coaching staff were fired the next day, December 1, ending a disastrous 1–11 (0–9 Big Ten) season. For Walters' buyout, Purdue paid him $9.34 million.

=== Barry Odom era (2025–present) ===
Purdue announced that it was hiring then-current University of Nevada, Las Vegas head coach Barry Odom as its next head coach on December 8, 2024. With wins against Ball State and Southern Illinois (FCS) at the start of the 2025 season, Odom became the first Purdue head football coach to start their career 2–0 since Cleo A. O'Donnell in 1916. The team then went on to lose every following game, ending the season with a record of 2–10 (0–9 Big Ten) following a 3–56 blowout loss at home to Indiana in that year's Old Oaken Bucket game. ESPN ranked Purdue's 2025 schedule as the third toughest in the nation, behind Wisconsin and Florida, respectively. Following the 2025 season there were substantial changes in the coaching staff. On December 8, 2025, Odom fired running back coach Lamar Conard, the last remaining staff member from the Walters era, and the offensive coach Vance Vince. On December 18, linebackers coach and defensive coordinator Mike Scherer was fired as well. On December 19, Purdue made a controversial announcement that it was re-hiring former defensive coordinator and linebackers coach Kevin Kane, who had served the Minnesota Golden Gophers for the 2025 season. Kane was let go from Purdue along with most of the coaching staff in 2024 following the firing of Ryan Walters. On December 26, Purdue announced it was hiring veteran coach Dave Steckel as senior defensive analyst. Steckel briefly worked with Odom when they were both on the coaching staff at Missouri.

== Conference affiliations ==
- Independent (1887–1890)
- Indiana Intercollegiate Athletic Association (1891–1894)
- Independent (1895)
- Big Ten Conference (1896–present)

== Championships ==
=== National championships ===
Purdue's 1931 team was retroactively selected national champion by Parke Davis, an NCAA-designated major selector. As a split selection, Davis also named Pittsburgh as national champion. However, the NCAA only lists Southern California as the national champion for 1931, and does not credit Purdue with any national championships in football.

Year	Coach	Selector	Overall Record	Conference Record
1931	Noble Kizer	Parke H. Davis	9–1	5–1

=== Conference championships ===
Purdue has won 12 conference championships, five outright and seven shared. Of those, four are Indiana Intercollegiate Athletic Association titles and eight are Big Ten Conference titles. As members of the Indiana Intercollegiate Athletic Association and the Big Ten, the Boilermakers have amassed a record of 154–64–3 (.703 winning percentage) in conference play.

Season	Coach	Conference	Record	Conference Record
1891	Knowlton Ames	IIAA	4–0	4–0
1892	Knowlton Ames	IIAA	8–0	4–0
1893	D.M. Balliet	IIAA	5–2–1	4–0
1894	D.M. Balliet	IIAA	9–1	4–0
1918†	A. G. Scanlon	Big Ten Conference	3–3	1–0
1929	James Phelan	Big Ten Conference	8–0	5–0
1931†	Noble Kizer	Big Ten Conference	9–1	5–1
1932†	Noble Kizer	Big Ten Conference	7–0–1	5–0–1
1943†	Elmer Burnham	Big Ten Conference	9–0	6–0
1952†	Stu Holcomb	Big Ten Conference	4–3–1	4–1–1
1967†	Jack Mollenkopf	Big Ten Conference	8–2	6–1
2000†	Joe Tiller	Big Ten Conference	8–4	6–2

† Co-champions

=== Division championships ===
Purdue has won one division title.

Year	Division	Coach	Opponent	CG Result
2022	Big Ten West	Jeff Brohm	Michigan	L 22–43

== Bowl games ==
Purdue has participated in 21 bowl games throughout its history, compiling an 11–10 record. Purdue did not appear frequently in post-season play from 1967 to 1984, but they played well, winning 4 of 5 bowl games including four consecutive wins between 1967 and 1980. When Tiller arrived in 1997, Purdue went to eight consecutive bowl games, but only won three of the eight bowl games. Tiller would lead the Boilermakers to a total of 10 bowl games in his 12 seasons as head coach. Of those 20 bowl appearances, the Boilermakers have participated in 1 "major" Division I-A/FBS bowl games, which was part of the BCS Bowl Games. The Boilermakers have never played in a National Championship Game.

Season	Coach	Bowl	Opponent	Result
1966	Jack Mollenkopf	Rose Bowl	USC	W 14–13
1978	Jim Young	Peach Bowl	Georgia Tech	W 41–21
1979	Jim Young	Bluebonnet Bowl	Tennessee	W 27–22
1980	Jim Young	Liberty Bowl	Missouri	W 28–25
1984	Leon Burtnett	Peach Bowl	Virginia	L 24–27
1997	Joe Tiller	Alamo Bowl	Oklahoma State	W 33–20
1998	Joe Tiller	Alamo Bowl	Kansas State	W 37–34
1999	Joe Tiller	Outback Bowl	Georgia	L 25–28
2000	Joe Tiller	Rose Bowl	Washington	L 24–34
2001	Joe Tiller	Sun Bowl	Washington State	L 27–33
2002	Joe Tiller	Sun Bowl	Washington	W 34–24
2003	Joe Tiller	Capital One Bowl	Georgia	L 27–34
2004	Joe Tiller	Sun Bowl	Arizona State	L 23–27
2006	Joe Tiller	Champs Sports Bowl	Maryland	L 7–24
2007	Joe Tiller	Motor City Bowl	Central Michigan	W 51–48
2011	Danny Hope	Little Caesars Pizza Bowl	Western Michigan	W 37–32
2012	Patrick Higgins (interim)	Heart of Dallas Bowl	Oklahoma State	L 14–58
2017	Jeff Brohm	Foster Farms Bowl	Arizona	W 38–35
2018	Jeff Brohm	Music City Bowl	Auburn	L 14–63
2021	Jeff Brohm	Music City Bowl	Tennessee	W 48–45
2022	Brian Brohm (interim)	Citrus Bowl	LSU	L 7–63

== Head coaches ==
Joe Tiller, Purdue's all-time wins lead as head coach.

There have been 39 head coaches with 40 tenures since the inaugural team in 1887, with Barry Odom being the current head coach.

No.	Coach	Years	Record	Pct.
1	Albert Berg	1887	0–1	.000
2	George Andrew Reisner	1889	2–1	.667
3	Clinton L. Hare	1890	3–3	.500
4	Knowlton Ames	1891–1892	12–0	1.000
5, 9	D.M. Balliet	1893–1895, 1901	22–10–2	.676
6	S. M. Hammond	1896	4–2–1	.643
7	William W. Church	1897	5–3–1	.611
8	Alpha Jamison	1898–1900	11–11–1	.500
10	Charles Best	1902	7–2–1	.750
11	Oliver Cutts	1903–1904	13–5	.722
12	Albert E. Herrnstein	1905	6–1–1	.813
13	Myron E. Witham	1906	0–5	.000
14	Leigh C. Turner	1907	0–5	.000
15	Frederick A. Speik	1908–1909	6–8	.429
16	Bill Horr	1910–1912	8–11–3	.432
17	Andy Smith	1913–1915	12–6–3	.643
18	Cleo A. O'Donnell	1916–1917	5–8–1	.393
19	A. G. Scanlon	1918–1920	7–12–1	.375
20	William Henry Dietz	1921	1–6	.143
21	James Phelan	1922–1929	35–22–5	.605
22	Noble Kizer	1930–1936	42–13–3	.750
23	Mal Elward	1937–1941	16–18–6	.475
24	Elmer Burnham	1942–1943	10–8	.556
25	Cecil Isbell	1944–1945	14–14–1	.500
26	Stu Holcomb	1946–1955	35–42–4	.457
27	Jack Mollenkopf	1956–1969	84–39–9	.670
28	Bob DeMoss	1970–1972	13–18	.419
29	Alex Agase	1973–1976	18–25–1	.420
30	Jim Young	1977–1981	38–19–1	.664
31	Leon Burtnett	1982–1986	21–34–1	.384
32	Fred Akers	1987–1990	12–31–1	.284
33	Jim Colletto	1991–1996	21–42–3	.341
34	Joe Tiller	1997–2008	87–62	.584
35	Danny Hope	2009–2012	22–27	.449
36	Patrick Higgins	2012	0–1	.000
37	Darrell Hazell	2013–2016	9–33	.214
38	Gerad Parker	2016	0–6	.000
39	Jeff Brohm	2017–2022	36–34	.514
40	Brian Brohm	2023	0–1	.000
41	Ryan Walters	2023–2024	5–19	.208
42	Barry Odom	2025–	2–9	.182

== Facilities ==
=== Stuart Field (1892–1924) ===
Stuart Field was dedicated on April 16, 1892, and named for Charles B. and William V. Stuart, two brothers who served on the university's board of trustees. Originally a seven-acre (2.8 ha) field with 800 seats, by the 1910s it was expanded to twice that area and a seating capacity of five thousand.

=== Ross–Ade Stadium (1924–present) ===
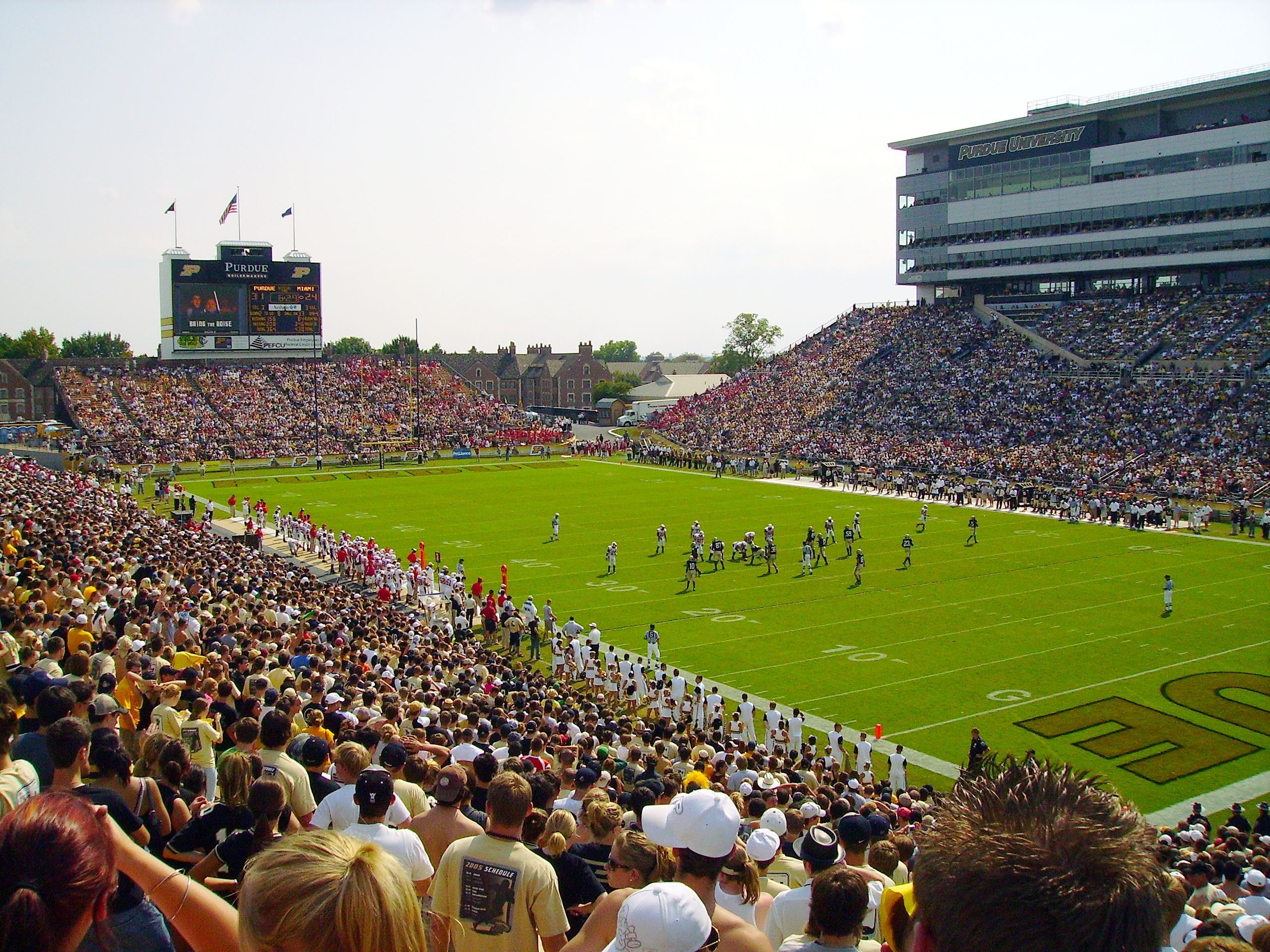
Ross–Ade Stadium during a game in 2006

The Boilermakers have called Ross–Ade Stadium home since 1924. It is named for David E. Ross and George Ade, the principal benefactors. Ross–Ade Stadium opened on November 22, 1924, with a seating capacity of 13,500 and standing room for an additional 5,000 people. A series of additions and renovations pushed the seating capacity to almost 68,000 (70,000 with standing room). In 2001 Purdue University began a $70 million renovation, which led to a reduced seating capacity of 62,500. Following 2023 renovations to add seating in the south end zone, the current capacity is 61,441.

=== Mollenkopf Athletic Center ===
An indoor training facility used primarily for the football team. It includes a full practice football field, extensive weight room, and offices for the football program. Also housed in Mollenkopf is the Purdue Football Hall of Glory.

== Rivalries ==
Purdue's major rival has always been Indiana University, with whom they play for the Old Oaken Bucket, but during the Joe Tiller era the rivalry with Notre Dame in football has become the most heated and most competitive with Joe Tiller led teams going 5–7 vs. Notre Dame. Danny Hope picked up the Shillelagh Trophy with a 24–21 loss in his first season as head coach. In addition, Purdue has a long-standing rivalry with Illinois, with whom they play for the Purdue Cannon trophy.

Due to having an odd number of teams from 1993 to 2010, the Big Ten utilized a rotating system of conference games. Every school was designated two official rivals, whom they played every year. The official rivals for Purdue were Indiana and Northwestern. However, after the expansion of the Big Ten to 12 schools, Purdue and Northwestern were placed into separate conference divisions and no longer played each other on an annual basis.

From 2011 to 2013, Purdue's new designated cross-division rival was Iowa. This matchup was mocked by fans of both teams. The other cross-divisional rivalries set up by the Big Ten had some history or a trophy behind the pairing, but Purdue and Iowa were left over. The respective SB Nation blogs of Hammer & Rails and Black Heart Gold Pants celebrated this rivalry between the two schools with the tongue-in-cheek reference to each other as "Our Most Hated Rivals" or simple "OMHR"

=== Chicago ===
Chicago leads the series 27–14–1, though the series has not been played since 1936. It is unlikely to be renewed as the Maroons currently compete in NCAA Division III.

=== Illinois ===
Purdue leads the series 48–46–6 through the 2024 season.

=== Indiana ===
Purdue leads the series with Indiana Hoosiers 77–43–6 through the 2024 season.

=== Notre Dame ===
Notre Dame leads the series 61–26–2 through the 2025 season.

== Cradle of Quarterbacks ==
Purdue's football program has long been known for its prolific passing quarterbacks, ranging from players who have set School, Big Ten & NCAA records, to being named All-Americans and finalist for national awards, to being elected into the College Football and Pro Football Hall of Fames. This great tradition has led to the school being nicknamed the "Cradle of Quarterbacks". When Drew Brees led the New Orleans Saints to a victory in Super Bowl XLIV, Purdue became just the second college in history to produce 3 different Super Bowl winning quarterbacks. The first Purdue quarterback to win an NFL title was Cecil Isbell who led the Green Bay Packers to the 1939 NFL title.

Name	Years as starter	NFL draft
Aidan O'Connell	2019–22	135th pick by the Las Vegas Raiders
David Blough	2015–18	Went undrafted
Curtis Painter	2005–08	201st pick by the Indianapolis Colts
Kyle Orton	2001–04	106th pick by the Chicago Bears
Drew Brees †	1998–2000	32nd pick by the San Diego Chargers
Jim Everett	1981–85	3rd pick by the Houston Oilers
Scott Campbell	1980–83	191st pick by the Pittsburgh Steelers
Mark Herrmann	1977–80	98th pick by the Denver Broncos
Gary Danielson	1970–72	Went undrafted
Mike Phipps	1967–69	3rd pick by the Cleveland Browns
Bob Griese †	1964–66	4th pick by the Miami Dolphins
Len Dawson †	1954–56	5th pick by the Pittsburgh Steelers
Dale Samuels	1950–52	28th pick by the Chicago Cardinals
Bob DeMoss	1945–48	13th pick by the New York Bulldogs
Cecil Isbell	1935–37	7th pick by the Green Bay Packers

† Quarterbacks to start and win a Super Bowl

== Culture ==
=== Marching band ===
The Purdue All-American Marching Band is the marching band of Purdue University. The Purdue "All-American" Marching Band (AAMB) is the primary source of auxiliary entertainment for Purdue University football games. AAMB does many service performances for high schools, junior high schools, and elementary schools, and has been the host band of the Indianapolis 500 race every year the race has been held since 1927. The band has grown from an original 5 members to 373 members, making it one of the largest marching bands in the world. The two most distinctive features of the AAMB are the World's Largest Drum and solo baton twirler the Purdue Golden Girl.

In 1886 the Purdue Student Army Training Corps produced five men who provided music for the Army trainees to listen to during their morning conditioning runs. While operating without a director until 1904, the band had started playing at Purdue football games and had grown to over 50 members. In 1904, Paul Spotts Emrick joined the band. His experience as a conductor resulted in his election as band president and director the next year. During his senior year at Purdue, the marching band, under Emrick, became the first band to break ranks and form a letter on the field—the famous Block "P".

Emrick stayed on as director after his graduation in 1908. In 1921, Emrick commissioned Leedy to construct the World's Largest Drum, and it has been a part of the marching band ever since. In 1935, during a Purdue football game at Northwestern University the band donned lights on their uniforms while performing at halftime. With the stadium lights turned off for the performance, the band drew such awe from radio broadcaster Ted Husing; he referred to them as a "truly All-American marching band", hence the current title of the band.

=== Mascot ===
==== Boilermaker Special ====
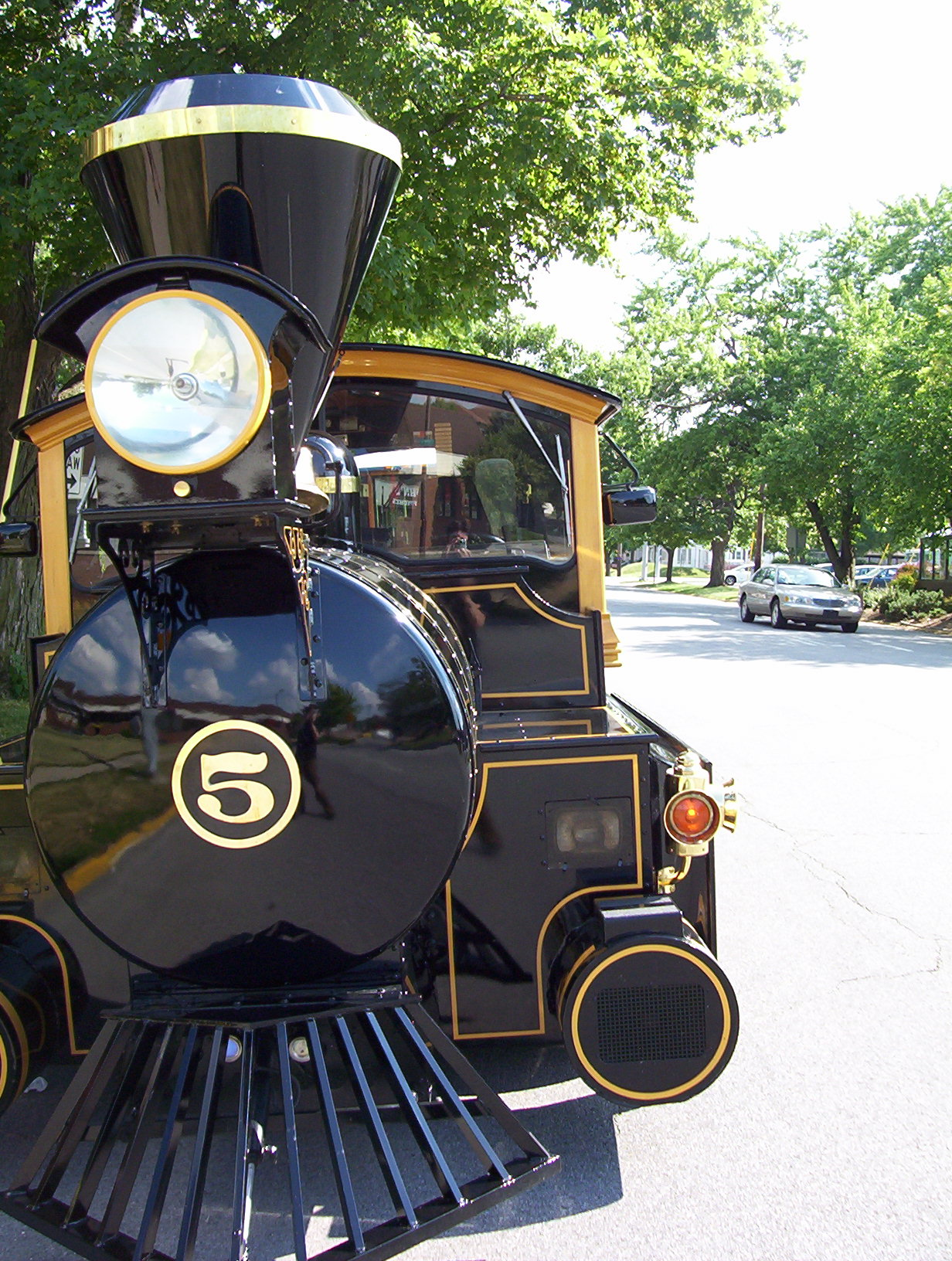
The former official mascot of Purdue : The Boilermaker Special V (1993–2011)

The Boilermaker Special is the official mascot of Purdue University in West Lafayette, Indiana. It resembles a Victorian-era railroad locomotive and is built on a truck chassis. It is operated and maintained by the student members of the Purdue Reamer Club.

Purdue University is a land-grant university (or Agricultural and Mechanical (A&M) university) created through the Morrill Act of 1862. In the 1890s, Purdue became a leader in the research of railway technology. For many years Purdue operated the "Schenectady No. 1", and later the "Schenectady No. 2", on a dynamometer in an engineering laboratory on the West Lafayette campus. These were 4-4-0 type steam locomotives manufactured by the Baldwin Locomotive Works of Philadelphia, Pennsylvania. The Schenectady was a classic Victorian-era design similar in construction to the Western and Atlantic Railroad No. 3 (see The General (locomotive) on display at the Southern Museum of Civil War and Locomotive History). Purdue even operated its own railroad to connect the campus to a main rail line. In the 1930s the dynamometer was decommissioned and the Schenectady No. 2 was retired as the railroad industry in the United States converted from steam to diesel-electric locomotives.

Purdue did not have a mascot. In 1939, Purdue student Israel Selkowitz suggested the school adopt an official mascot to represent Purdue's engineering heritage. He originally proposed a "mechanical man". After much debate, it was decided to build a locomotive on an automobile chassis. This choice allowed the mascot to build on Purdue's engineering and railroading heritage, as well as represent the school's nickname "Boilermakers" in a meaningful way.

The "Boilermaker" nickname came about during the early years of Purdue football. There had been rumors the university enrolled burly boilermakers from the Monon Railroad shops in Lafayette, Indiana as students/football players to help beef up the scrawny football team. When a railroad operated an extra train independent of the scheduled timetable, it was known as a "special". Thus, the trains which carried Purdue's sporting teams and their fans to other cities for athletic contests were known as "Boilermaker Specials". It was a perfect match.

Financial and moral support for the first Boilermaker Special was provided by key members of the Purdue University graduating class of 1907, and members of the Purdue Reamer Club from the graduating classes of 1940 and 1941.

==== Purdue Pete ====
Purdue Pete was first designed as a logo by the University Bookstore in 1940. They would put it on their products and portray him dressed up in different clothes for the different majors. He got the Purdue part of his name from Purdue University. The owners of the bookstores gave him the name "Pete", yet no one officially knows why this was chosen to be his name. He was given a physical identity in 1956 as he came out and helped the students cheer at a pep rally. Over the years, the appearance of Purdue Pete has gone under several drastic changes as well as several minor changes. His original head was made of paper-mâché, pasted onto a chicken wire frame. This was very inconvenient for the person who would be underneath because it would limit his movements, yet he was still expected to move around and do stunts. This head was changed to a giant fiberglass head where the person inside would use a harness to support it. This was unpractical due to the sheer size of it. In the 1980s, Purdue Pete acquired the appearance he is now associated with. Proposals to switch to a soft-sculpture costume were rejected in 2006 and 2011.

=== Den of Defensive Ends ===
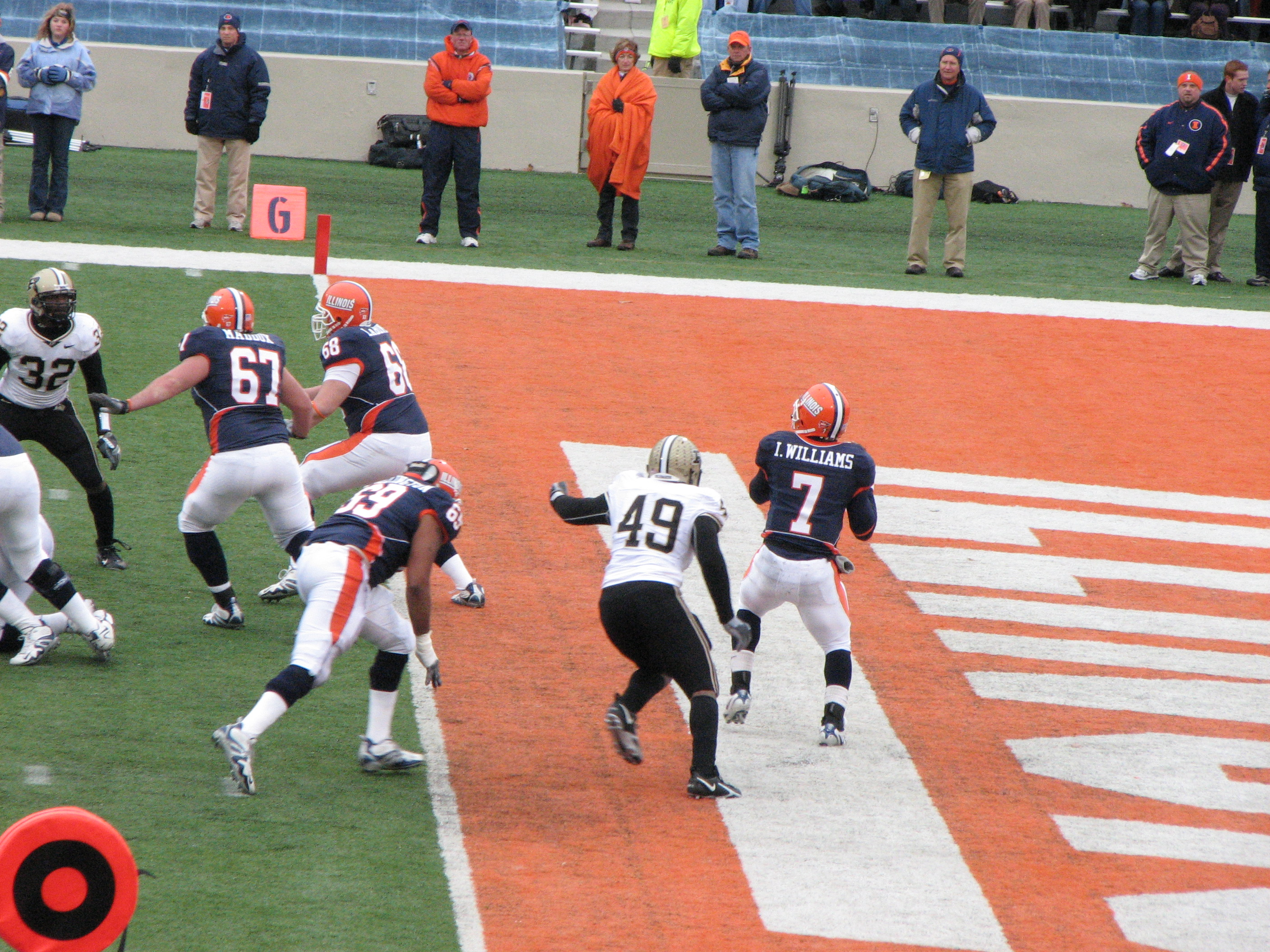
Anthony Spencer sacking Juice Williams of Illinois

Purdue has also had a more recent tradition of sending defensive ends to the NFL. Since 1999, Purdue has had 10 defensive ends selected in the NFL draft. With their success in the NFL, Purdue has earned the nickname, the "Den of Defensive Ends".

Name	Years as Starter	NFL draft
George Karlaftis†	2019–21	30th Pick by the Kansas City Chiefs
Ryan Kerrigan	2007–10	16th Pick by the Washington Redskins
Cliff Avril †	2004–07	92nd Pick by the Detroit Lions
Anthony Spencer	2003–06	26th Pick by the Dallas Cowboys
Rob Ninkovich †	2004–05	135th Pick by the New Orleans Saints
Ray Edwards	2003–05	127th Pick by the Minnesota Vikings
Shaun Phillips	2000–03	98th Pick by the San Diego Chargers
Akin Ayodele	1999–2001	89th Pick by the Jacksonville Jaguars
Chike Okeafor	1994–96, 1998	89th Pick by the San Francisco 49ers
Rosevelt Colvin †	1995–98	111th Pick by the Chicago Bears
Keena Turner †	1976–79	39th Pick by the San Francisco 49ers
Steve Baumgartner	1971-72	51st Pick by the New Orleans Saints
Nick Mumley	1956	51st Pick by the Philadelphia Eagles
Lamar Lundy	1954–56	47th Pick by the Los Angeles Rams
Leo Sugar	1949–51	123rd Pick by the Chicago Cardinals

† Defensive ends to start and win a Super Bowl.

== Logos and uniforms ==
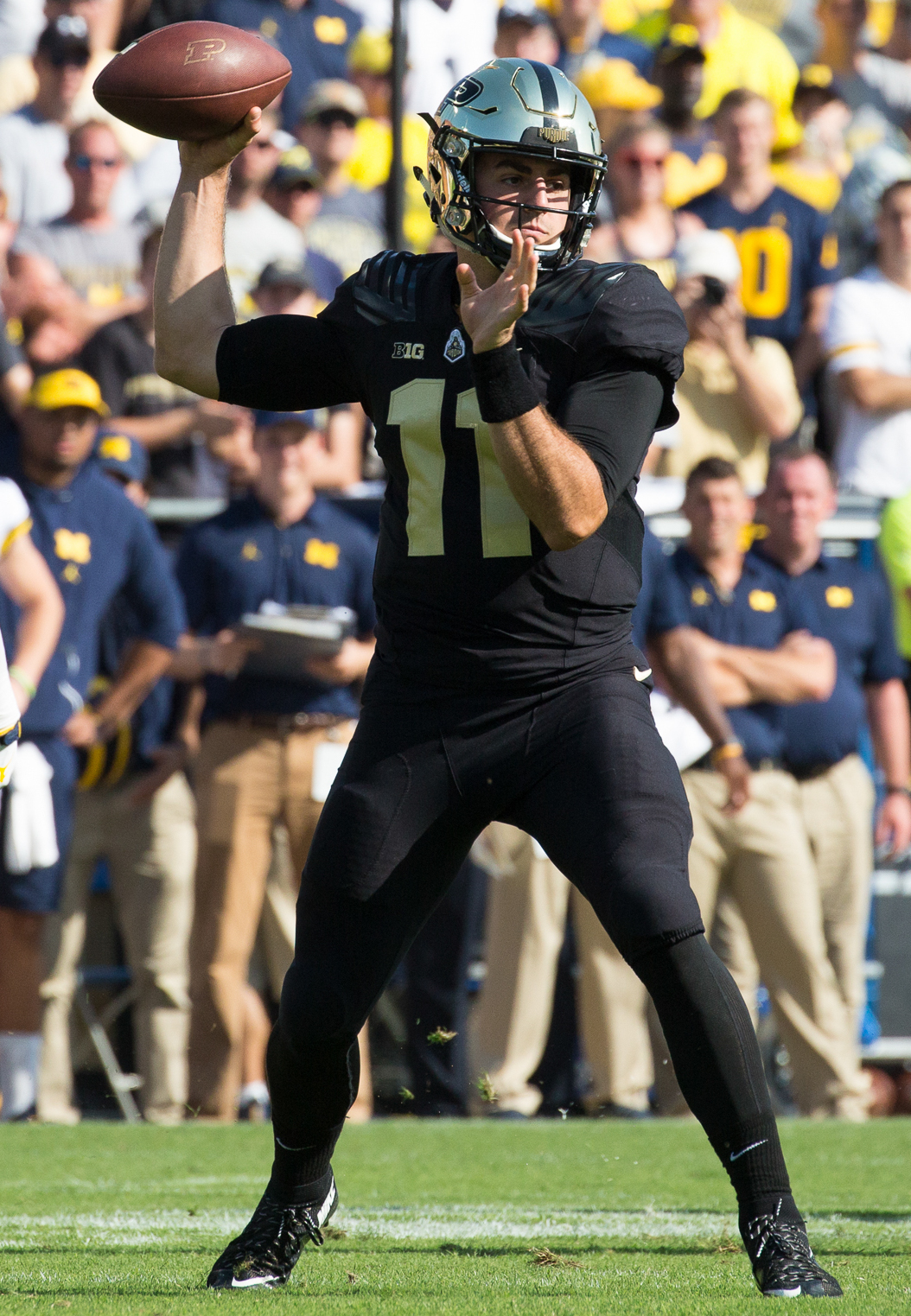
David Blough in the 2019 Purdue uniforms.

Purdue's colors are Old Gold and Black, as are its uniforms. Home uniforms are black with old gold numerals while the away uniform is white with black numerals.

Purdue's Pride sticker (given out for good performances) was the Purdue logo (locomotive). This was changed in 2006 to a sledgehammer with the slant "P" in the hammer's head (like the one wielded by mascot Purdue Pete). In the 2006 game against the Indiana State Sycamores, Purdue wore a throwback uniform from 1966, in honor of the 40th anniversary of the school's first Rose Bowl team. It featured a white jersey with two outer black stripes on the shoulder and one inner gold stripe. The numerals were black with no outline. The team wore gold pants with two black stripes on the sides, and the helmets were old gold with black numbers and one black stripe down the middle. The gold in the throwback uniforms was more yellow in hue than that in the regular 1997–present uniforms.

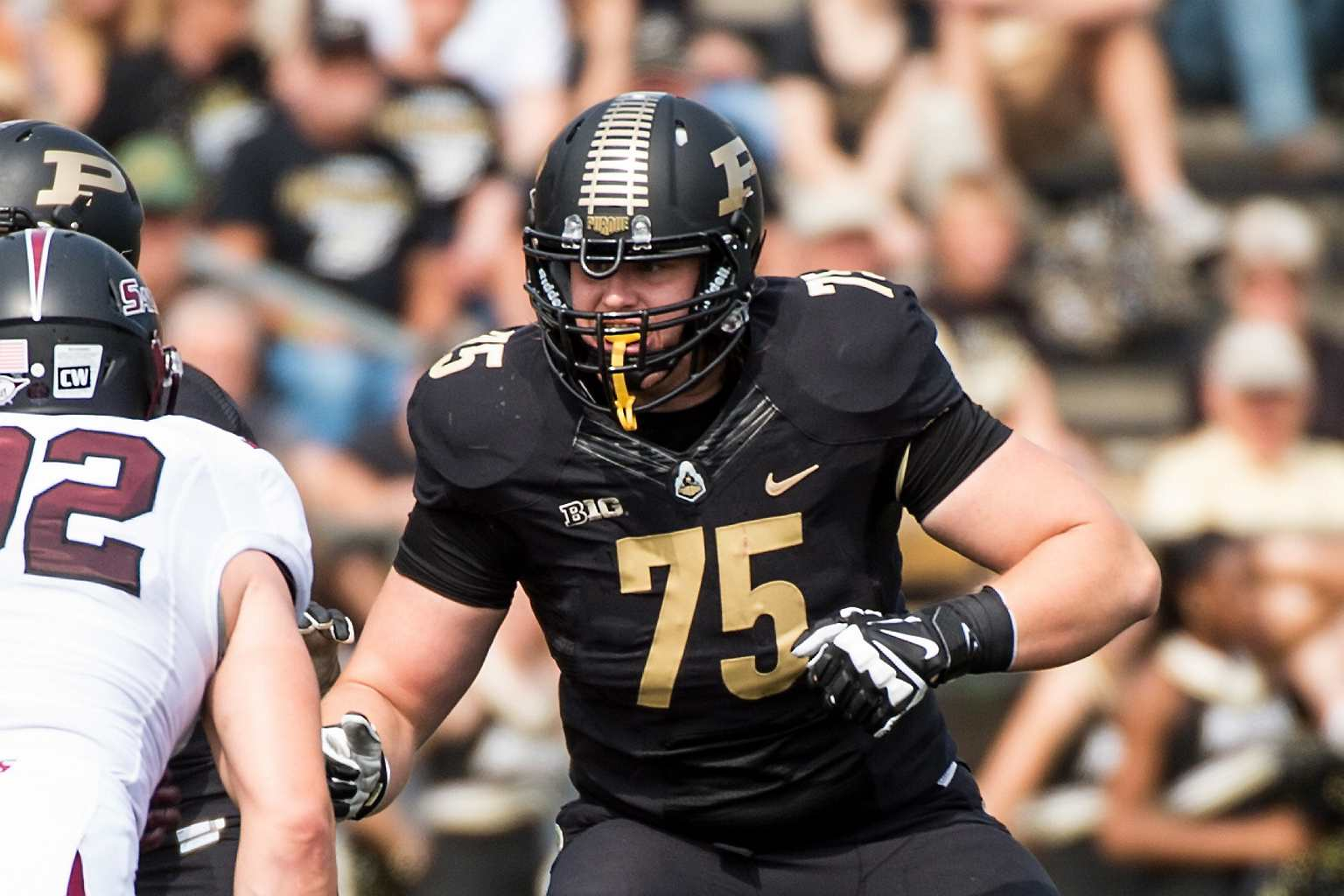
David Hedelin in the all-black Purdue uniforms.

In 2002, Purdue changed from its black home jersey to an old gold jersey. The old gold uniforms had white numerals and black outline for home games, and white uniforms with old gold numbers and back outline for away games. Some complained that the numerals on the jersey were too hard to see, so in 2003 they changed to an old gold jersey with black numerals outlined in white, and white pants with two black stripes down the sides. After losing their opening game at home to Bowling Green, Tiller and the team decided to dump the gold jerseys and go back to the black uniforms. After they changed back to the black uniforms, the team came out to "Back in Black" by AC/DC for every home game in 2003. Since then, Purdue has stayed with the black uniforms. In one game against Wisconsin in 2006, the Boilermakers wore the black jersey with black pants. They had not sported an all-black look at home since the last game of the season in 1996 against Indiana.

In 2009, Purdue also wore the Black on Black in a night game against Notre Dame on the Purdue Blackout, and then wore them for the remainder of their home games. In 2010, the Black on Black remained the normal home uniform with the exception being the Homecoming game against Minnesota where the team donned Throwback Uniforms for the 2001 Rose Bowl team. While the original jerseys were made by Champion, the replicas were Nike branded.

In 2013, Purdue designed a new black helmet that was used during the Ohio State and Indiana games. The all black helmet had a matte finish with a decal of train tracks down the center of the helmet, with the university's official athletic logo at the end of the tracks. Also on the helmet was the phrase "One Brick Higher", the motto coach Darrell Hazell had chosen for the season. During the 2015 season, Purdue introduced a white helmet, as well as an anthracite gray uniform.

In 2016, Purdue announced that they would have a complete re-design of their uniforms for the 2016 season, using the motto, "Focus, Fight, Finish" for the three different designs.

== Final rankings ==
Purdue has finished a season ranked in the Associated Press (AP) poll on 17 occasions. The Boilermakers have finished ranked amongst the top 10 in college football on five occasions. Purdue attained its highest-ever ranking in the polls during the preseason of the 1968 season, when they were ranked No. 1 in the AP Poll for 6 straight weeks before they lost to No. 4 Ohio State 0–13. Since the implementation of the Bowl Championship Series (BCS) in 1998, Purdue has finished the regular season ranked one time in the final BCS standings. While the Boilermakers are 54–175–5 against opponents ranked in the AP Poll, they have an all-time record of 111–65–10 when ranked in the AP Poll themselves.

Season	Record	AP
1943	9–0	5
1952	4–3–2	18
1958	6–1–2	13
1960	4–4–1	19
1961	6–3	12
1966	9–2	7
1967	8–2	9
1968	8–2	10
1969	8–2	18
1978	9–2–1	13
1979	10–2	15
1980	9–3	17
1997	9–3	15
1998	9–4	24
1999	7–5	25
2000	8–4	13
2003	9–4	18

=== "Spoilermakers" ===
Purdue has knocked off the No. 1 ranked football team in college football seven times over the years—the third most of all the Division I teams in college football. Only Notre Dame and Oklahoma have accomplished this more times. The Boilermakers have nine wins against AP No. 1 or No. 2 teams as an unranked squad, four more than any other program in the poll era. The first Spoilermaker game occurred in 1950 when Purdue broke Notre Dame's 39-game win streak. In 1953, Purdue ended Michigan State's 28-game win streak with a 6–0 win.

Date	Opponent	Location	Score
October 7, 1950	No. 1 Notre Dame	South Bend, Indiana	28–14
October 2, 1954	No. 1 Notre Dame	South Bend, Indiana	27–14
October 19, 1957	No. 1 Michigan St	East Lansing, Michigan	20–13
November 12, 1960	No. 1 Minnesota	Minneapolis, Minnesota	23–14
September 25, 1965	No. 1 Notre Dame	West Lafayette, Indiana	25–21
September 30, 1967	No. 1 Notre Dame	West Lafayette, Indiana	28–21
November 6, 1976	No. 1 Michigan	West Lafayette, Indiana	16–14
October 20, 2018	No. 2 Ohio State	West Lafayette, Indiana	49–20
October 16, 2021	No. 2 Iowa	Iowa City, Iowa	24–7

== Individual accolades ==
=== Heisman Trophy candidates ===
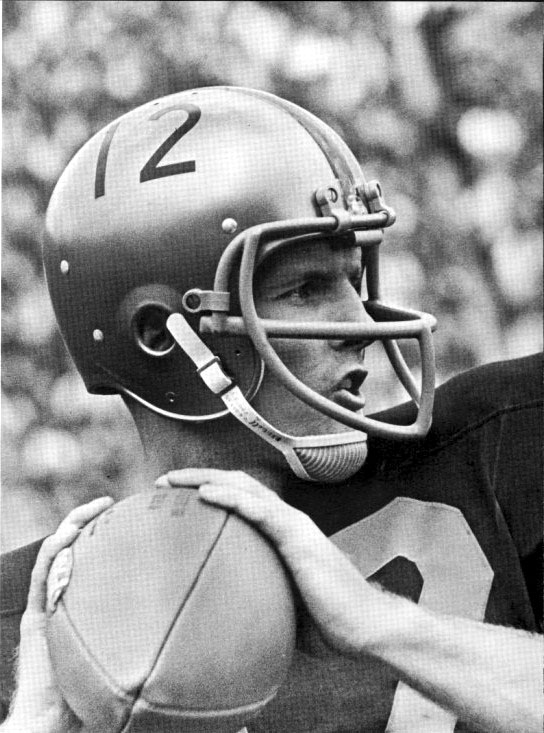
Bob Griese, two-time Heisman Trophy candidate and 1966 Sammy Baugh Trophy recipient

Purdue has produced eight Heisman Trophy candidates. Four Boilermakers, Bob Griese, Leroy Keyes, Mark Herrmann and Drew Brees have each been finalist for the award in two separate seasons.

Season	Player	Finish	Votes
1943	Tony Butkovich	8th	65
1965	Bob Griese	8th	193
1966	Bob Griese	2nd	618
1967	Leroy Keyes	3rd	1,366
1968	Leroy Keyes	2nd	1,103
1969	Mike Phipps	2nd	1,334
1972	Otis Armstrong	8th	208
1979	Mark Herrmann	8th	54
1980	Mark Herrmann	4th	405
1985	Jim Everett	6th	77
1999	Drew Brees	4th	308
2000	Drew Brees	3rd	619

=== Major award winners ===
Seven Boilermaker players and coaches have won major college football awards.

Season	Player	Position	Award
1966	Bob Griese	QB	Sammy Baugh Trophy
1969	Mike Phipps	QB	Sammy Baugh Trophy
1980	Mark Herrmann	QB	Sammy Baugh Trophy
2000	Drew Brees	QB	Maxwell Award
2000	Tim Stratton	TE	John Mackey Award
2001	Travis Dorsch	P	Ray Guy Award
2018	Rondale Moore	WR	Paul Hornung Award

=== All-Americans ===
A total of 55 Boilermakers have been recognized as All-Americans by various media selectors. Among those selections, 22 have achieved Consensus All-American status. Of those consensus All-Americans, seven were unanimous selections.

Purdue All-Americans
Season / Name / Pos.; 1929 / Elmer Sleight* / OT; 1929 / Ralph Welch* / FB; 1931 / Charles Miller / C; 1931 / Paul Moss / End; 1932 / Roy Horstmann / FB; 1932 / Paul Moss^{#} / End; 1933 / Duane Purvis* / RB; 1934 / Duane Purvis / RB; 1939 / Dave Rankin / End; 1940 / Dave Rankin* / End; 1943 / Alex Agase* / G; 1943 / Tony Butkovich / FB; 1944 / Babe Dimancheff / HB; 1945 / Tom Hughes / T; 1951 / Leo Sugar / DE; 1952 / Bernie Flowers* / End	Season / Name / Pos.; 1954 / Tom Bettis / G; 1958 / Tom Franckhauser / CB; 1958 / Gene Selawski / K; 1960 / Jerry Beabout / TE; 1962 / Don Brumm / T; 1964 / Harold Wells / DE; 1965 / Bob Griese* / QB; 1965 / Karl Singer / OT; 1965 / Jerry Shay / DT; 1966 / Jim Beirne / End; 1966 / John Charles / DB; 1966 / Bob Griese / QB; 1967 / Leroy Keyes^{#} / HB; 1968 / Leroy Keyes^{#} / HB/DB; 1968 / Chuck Kyle* / G; 1969 / Tim Foley / DB	Season / Name / Pos.; 1969 / Mike Phipps^{#} / QB; 1971 / Tom Luken / OG; 1972 / Otis Armstrong* / HB; 1972 / Dave Butz* / DT; 1973 / Carl Capria / DB; 1974 / Larry Burton / WR; 1975 / Ken Long / OT; 1975 / Ken Novak / DT; 1979 / Mark Herrmann / QB; 1980 / Mark Herrmann^{#} / QB; 1980 / Dave Young^{#} / TE; 1985 / Rod Woodson / DB; 1986 / Rod Woodson* / DB; 1989 / Shawn McCarthy / P; 1990 / Steve Jackson / DB	Season / Name / Pos.; 1995 / Mike Alstott / RB; 1997 / Brian Alford / WR; 1999 / Drew Brees / QB; 2000 / Drew Brees / QB; 2000 / Matt Light / OT; 2001 / Travis Dorsch* / P/K; 2003 / Stuart Schweigert / S; 2004 / Taylor Stubblefield^{#} / WR; 2006 / Anthony Spencer / DE; 2010 / Ryan Kerrigan^{#} / DE; 2018 / Rondale Moore* / WR/KR/PR; 2021 / David Bell* / WR; 2021 / George Karlaftis / DE; 2022 / Charlie Jones / WR; 2023 / Dillon Thieneman / S
* – denotes Consensus All-Americans
# – denotes Unanimous All-Americans

=== Conference award winners ===
The following Boilermakers have been recognized with Big Ten Conference football individual awards.

Season	Name	Pos.	Award
1966	Bob Griese	QB	Chicago Tribune Silver Football
1967	Leroy Keyes	RB	Chicago Tribune Silver Football
1969	Mike Phipps	QB	Chicago Tribune Silver Football
1972	Otis Armstrong	RB	Chicago Tribune Silver Football
1978	Jim Young	Head coach	Dave McClain Coach of the Year
1980	Mark Herrman	QB	Chicago Tribune Silver Football
1984	Leon Burtnett	Head coach	Dave McClain Coach of the Year
1988	Brian Fox	QB	Freshman of the Year
1989	Eric Hunter	QB	Freshman of the Year
1991	Corey Rogers	RB	Freshman of the Year
1992	Jeff Zgonina	DT	Defensive Player of the Year
1997	Joe Tiller	Head coach	Dave McClain Coach of the Year
1998	Drew Brees	QB	Offensive Player of the Year
2000	Stuart Schweigert	S	Freshman of the Year
2000	Drew Brees	QB	Offensive Player of the Year
2000	Drew Brees	QB	Chicago Tribune Silver Football
2010	Ryan Kerrigan	DE	Defensive lineman of the Year
2010	Ryan Kerrigan	DE	Defensive Player of the Year
2018	Rondale Moore	WR/KR/PR	Freshman of the Year
2018	Rondale Moore	WR	Receiver of the Year
2019	David Bell	WR	Freshman of the Year
2021	David Bell	WR	Receiver of the Year
2023	Dillon Thieneman	DB	Freshman of the Year

== Hall of Fame inductees ==
=== College Football Hall of Fame ===
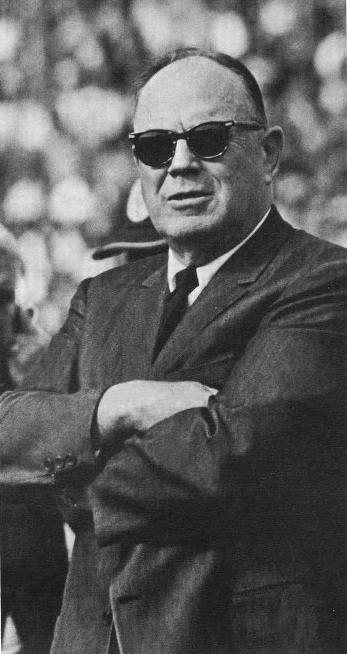
Jack Mollenkopf, Purdue Head Coach (1955–69)

A total of 18 Boilermakers have been inducted into the College Football Hall of Fame.

- Alex Agase – G (1941–43, 46)
  Inducted 1963.
- Otis Armstrong – HB (1970–72)
  Inducted 2012.
- Dave Butz – DT (1970–72)
  Inducted 2014.
- William Dietz – Head coach (1921–26)
  Inducted 2012.
- Chalmers "Bump" Elliott – HB (1943–44)
  Inducted 1989.
- Bob Griese – QB (1964–66)
  Inducted 1984.
- Mark Herrmann – QB (1977–80)
  Inducted 2010.
- Cecil Isbell – HB (1935–37)
  Inducted 1967.
- Leroy Keyes – HB (1966–68)
  Inducted 1990.
- John McKay – Head Coach (1960–75)
  Inducted 1988
- Jack Mollenkopf – Head Coach (1955–69)
  Inducted 1988.
- Elmer Oliphant – HB (1911–14)
  Inducted 1955.
- Jim Phelan – Head Coach (1922–29)
  Inducted 1973.
- Mike Phipps – QB (1967–69)
  Inducted 2006.
- Anthony Poindexter – Assistant Coach (2017–2020)
  Inducted 2020.
- Andy Smith – Head Coach (1913–15)
  Inducted 1951.
- Rod Woodson – S (1983–86)
  Inducted 2016.
- Jim Young – Head Coach (1977–81)
  Inducted 1999.

=== Pro Football Hall of Fame ===
Five Boilermakers hold the distinguished title of Pro Football Hall of Fame inductees.

- Len Dawson – QB (1957–1975); HoF Class of 1987
- Bob Griese – QB (1967–1980); HoF Class of 1990
- Hank Stram – Player and assistant coach at Purdue, inducted as a Coach (1960–1974; 1976–1977); HoF Class of 2003
- Rod Woodson – CB / S (1987–2003); HoF Class of 2009
- Drew Brees - QB (2001–2020); HoF Class of 2026

=== Purdue Intercollegiate Athletics Hall of Fame ===
Since its institution in 1994, the Purdue University Intercollegiate Athletics Hall of Fame recognizes those participants that have helped elevate Boilermaker athletics into one of the most respected programs in the nation. Former athletes, coaches and administrators are eligible for selection 5 years following their association with Purdue athletics. The following individuals have been inducted into the Purdue Intercollegiate Athletics Hall of Fame for their contributions to the Boilermaker football program:

- Bernie Allen
- Mike Alstott
- Otis Armstrong
- Erich Barnes
- Jim Beirne
- Tom Bettis
- Drew Brees
- Pete Brewster
- Lawrence Burton
- Tony Butkovich
- Dave Butz
- John Charles
- Rosevelt Colvin
- Dr. Lloyd Combs
- Gary Danielson
- Len Dawson
- Bob DeMoss
- Babe Dimancheff
- Travis Dorsch
- Jim Everett
- Dutch Fehring
- Bernie Flowers
- Tim Foley
- Bob Griese
- Mark Herrmann
- Cecil Isbell
- Alpha Jamison
- Leroy Keyes
- Noble Kizer
- Matt Light
- Lamar Lundy
- Guy "Red" Mackey
- Felix Mackiewicz
- Ned Maloney
- Jack Mollenkopf
- Elmer Oliphant
- Mike Phipps
- Duane Purvis
- Dave Rankin
- Dale Samuels
- Jerry Shay
- Bill Skowron
- Elmer Sleight
- Darryl Stingley
- Hank Stram
- Taylor Stubblefield
- Leo Sugar
- Harry Szulborski
- Joe Tiller
- Keena Turner
- Sam Voinoff
- Ralph Welch
- Rod Woodson
- Dave Young
- Jim Young
- Jeff Zgonina

== Boilermakers in professional football ==
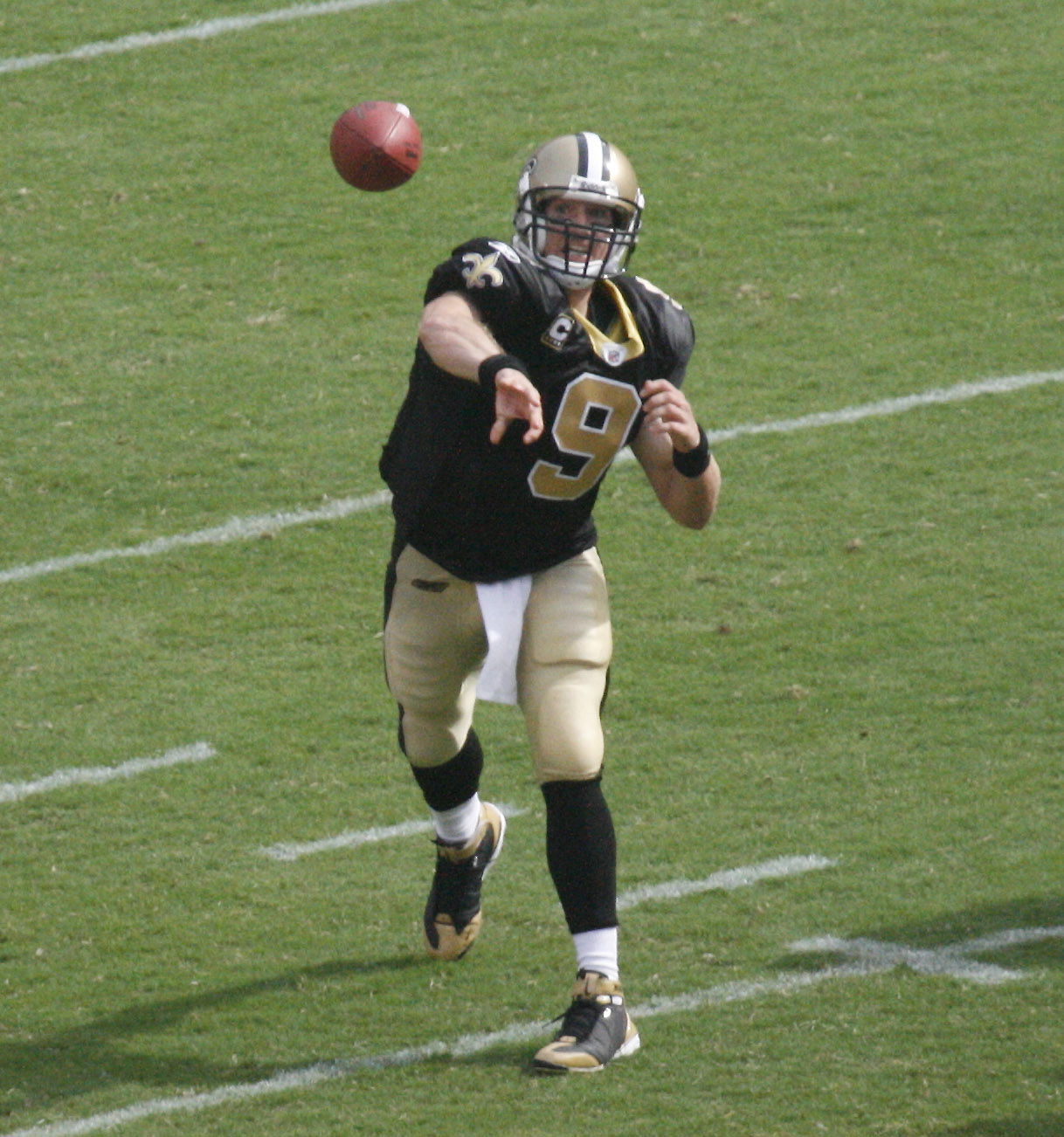
Drew Brees, of the New Orleans Saints

Purdue has produced a total of 314 NFL draft selections. The following "Active" and "All-Star" lists account for past and present Purdue University football players that have participated in the National Football League, the Canadian Football League, and the Arena Football League.

=== Active ===
As of November 18 2026, there are a total of 8 Boilermakers listed on team rosters in the NFL,

- Derrick Barnes – LB – Detroit Lions
- Payne Durham – TE – Tampa Bay Buccaneers
- Jalen Graham – LB – San Francisco 49ers
- Gus Hartwig – C – Atlanta Falcons
- George Karlaftis – DE – Kansas City Chiefs
- Marcus Mbow – OT/OG – New York Giants
- Aidan O'Connell – QB – Las Vegas Raiders
- Tyrone Tracy Jr. – RB – New York Giants

=== All-Stars ===
Among the numerous Boilermakers that have participated in the NFL, CFL, and AFL, a total of 44 have received all-star recognition by their respective leagues.

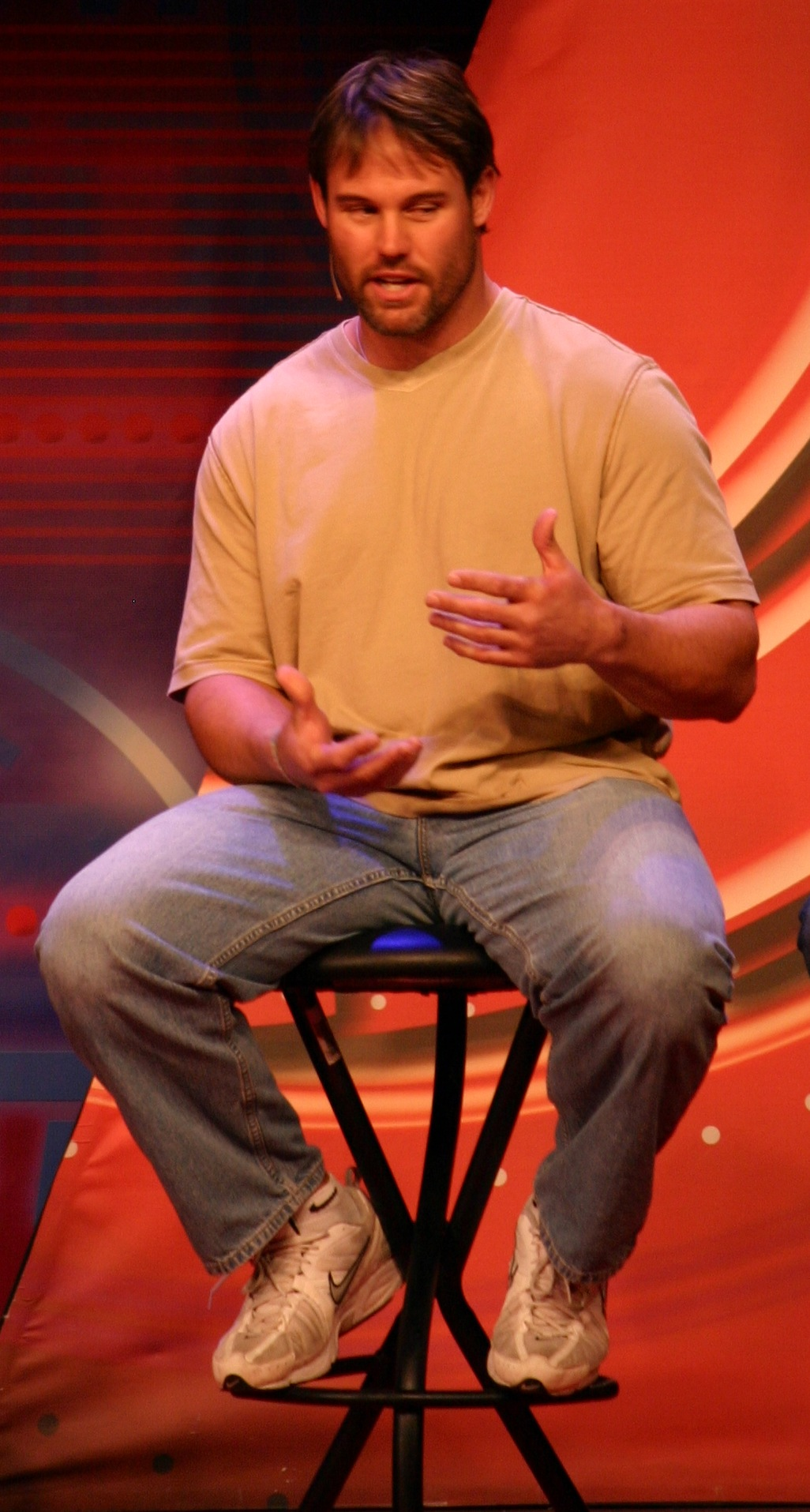
Mike Alstott, Purdue's all-time leading rusher and six-time NFL Pro Bowl selection

- Mike Alstott – FB
  NFL Pro Bowl (1997, 1998, 1999, 2000, 2001, 2002)
  NFL All-Pro (1996, 1997, 1998, 1999)
- Otis Armstrong – RB
  NFL Pro Bowl (1974, 1976)
  NFL All-Pro (1974)
- Cliff Avril – DE

NFL Pro Bowl (2017)

- Erich Barnes – DB
  NFL Pro Bowl (1959, 1961, 1962, 1963, 1964, 1968)
  NFL All-Pro (1961)
- Dick Barwegan – G
  NFL Pro Bowl (1951, 1952, 1953, 1954)
  NFL All-Pro (1948, 1949, 1950, 1951)
  NFL 1950s All-Decade Team
- Jim Beirne – WR
  NFL Pro Bowl (1969)
- Drew Brees – QB
  NFL Pro Bowl (2004, 2006, 2008, 2009, 2010, 2011, 2012, 2013, 2014, 2016, 2017, 2018)
  NFL All-Pro (2006)
- Pete Brewster – TE
  NFL Pro Bowl (1955, 1956)
- Don Brumm – DE
  NFL Pro Bowl (1968)
- Dave Butz – DL
  NFL Pro Bowl (1983)
  NFL All-Pro (1983)
  NFL 1980s All-Decade Team
- Ralph Claypool – C

NFL All-Pro (1925)

- Denny Chronopoulos – OG
  CFL East All-Star (1993)
- Len Dawson – QB
  NFL Pro Bowl (1962, 1964, 1966, 1967, 1968, 1969, 1971)
  NFL All-Pro (1962, 1966)
  Super Bowl IV MVP
  NFL Man of the Year Award (1973)
  2nd Team, AFL All-Time Team
  Kansas City Chiefs #16 retired
  Pro Football Hall of Fame (1987)
- Cris Dishman – DB
  NFL Pro Bowl (1991, 1997)
  NFL All-Pro (1991)
- Johnny Drake – DB
  NFL Pro Bowl (1938, 1939, 1940)
  NFL All-Pro (1940)
- Jim Everett – QB
  NFL Pro Bowl (1990)
- Ed Flanagan – C
  NFL Pro Bowl (1969, 1970, 1971, 1973)
- Tim Foley – CB/S
  NFL Pro Bowl (1979)
- Abe Gibron – G
  NFL Pro Bowl (1952, 1953, 1954, 1955)
- Mel Gray – RB, WR, KR, PR
  NFL Pro Bowl (1990, 1991, 1992. 1994)
  NFL All-Pro (1990, 1991, 1994)
  NFL 1990s All-Decade Team
- Bob Griese – QB
  NFL Pro Bowl (1967, 1968, 1970, 1971, 1973, 1974, 1977, 1978)
  NFL All-Pro (1971, 1977)
  Miami Dolphins #12 retired
  Miami Dolphins Honor Roll
  Pro Football Hall of Fame (1990)
- Steve Griffin – WR, DB
  ArenaBowl II MVP
- Nick Hardwick – C
  NFL Pro Bowl (2006)
- Cecil Isbell – QB, RB
  NFL Pro Bowl (1938, 1939, 1940, 1941, 1942)
  NFL All-Pro (1941)
  Packers Hall of Fame
  NFL 1930s All-Decade Team
- Larry Kaminski – C
  NFL Pro Bowl (1967)
- Ryan Kerrigan – LB
  NFL Pro Bowl (2012, 2016, 2017, 2018)
- Joe Krupa – DT
  NFL Pro Bowl (1963)
- Matt Light – OT
  NFL Pro Bowl (2006, 2007, 2010)
  NFL All-Pro (2007)
- Lamar Lundy – DE
  NFL Pro Bowl (1959)
- Joe Mihal – OT
  NFL Pro Bowl (1940, 1941)
- Ookie Miller – C/G/LB

NFL All-Pro (1933)

- Raheem Mostert – RB

NFL Pro Bowl (2024)

- Elmer Oliphant – WB/TB

NFL All-Pro (1921)

- Ken Panfil – OT
  NFL Pro Bowl (1959)
- John Petty – FB
  NFL Pro Bowl (1942)
- Shaun Phillips – DE, LB
  NFL Pro Bowl (2010)
- Mike Pruitt – RB
  NFL Pro Bowl (1979, 1980)
- Jim Schwantz – LB
  NFL Pro Bowl (1996)
- Kory Sheets – RB
  CFL All-Star (2013)
  Grey Cup Most Valuable Player (2013)
- Kawann Short – DT
  NFL All-Pro (2015)
  NFL Pro Bowl (2016, 2018)
- Anthony Spencer – DE

NFL Pro Bowl (2013)

- Leo Sugar – DE
  NFL Pro Bowl (1958, 1960)
- Keena Turner – LB
  NFL Pro Bowl (1984)
- Rod Woodson – DB
  NFL Pro Bowl (1989, 1990, 1991, 1992, 1993, 1994, 1996, 1999, 2000, 2001, 2002)
  NFL All-Pro (1989, 1990, 1992, 1993, 1994, 2002)
  Pittsburgh Steelers All-Time Team
  NFL Defensive Player of the Year (1993)
  UPI AFL-AFC Player of the Year (1993)
  NFL 75th Anniversary All-Time Team
  NFL 1990s All-Decade Team

=== NFL top 50 draft selections ===
Of Purdue's 286 players selected in the NFL Draft, 58 Boilermakers have been amongst the top 50 selections of the draft.

- Frank Loebs
  1936 – 27th overall by the New York Giants
- Dick Sandefur
  1936 – 39th overall by the Pittsburgh Pirates
- Johnny Drake
  1937 – 10th overall by the Cleveland Rams
- Cecil Isbell
  1938 – 7th overall by the Green Bay Packers
- Marty Schreyer
  1938 – 22nd overall by the Green Bay Packers
- Joe Mihal
  1939 – 19th overall by the Philadelphia Eagles
- Lou Brock
  1940 – 24th overall by the Green Bay Packers
- Frank Bykowski
  1940 – 42nd overall by the Pittsburgh Steelers
- Babe Dimancheff
  1944 – 19th overall by the Boston Yanks
- Dick Barwegan
  1945 – 44th overall by the Boston Yanks
- Ed Cody
  1946 – 36th overall by the Green Bay Packers
- Phil O'Reilly
  1948 – 45th overall by the Pittsburgh Steelers
- Bob Pfohl
  1948 – 46th overall by the New York Giants
- Bob DeMoss
  1949 – 13th overall by the New York Bulldogs
- Lou Karras
  1950 – 32nd overall by the Washington Redskins
- Earl Murray
  1950 – 41st overall by the Baltimore Colts
- Barry French
  1951 – 45t overall by the Pittsburgh Steelers
- Pete Brewster
  1952 – 21st overall by the Chicago Cardinals
- Bernie Flowers
  1953 – 14th overall by the Baltimore Colts
- Dale Samuels
  1953 – 28th overall by the Chicago Cardinals
- Tom Bettis
  1955 – 5th overall by the Green Bay Packers
- Joe Krupa
  1956 – 17th overall by the Pittsburgh Steelers
- Dick Murley
  1956 – 39th overall by the Pittsburgh Steelers
- Len Dawson
  1957 – 5th overall by the Pittsburgh Steelers
- Lamar Lundy
  1957 – 47th overall by the Los Angeles Rams
- Erich Barnes
  1958 – 42nd overall by the Chicago Bears
- Tom Franckhauser
  1959 – 33rd overall by the Los Angeles Rams
- Ross Fichtner
  1960 – 33rd overall by the Cleveland Browns
- Don Brumm
  1963 – 13th overall by the St. Louis Cardinals
- Jim Garcia
  1965 – 17th overall by the Cleveland Browns
- Jerry Shay
  1966 – 7th overall by the Minnesota Vikings
- Bob Griese
  1967 – 4th overall by the Miami Dolphins
- John Charles
  1967 – 21st overall by the Boston Patriots
- Leroy Keyes
  1969 – 3rd overall by the Philadelphia Eagles
- Mike Phipps
  1970 – 3rd overall by the Cleveland Browns
- Dave Butz
  1973 – 5th overall by the St. Louis Cardinals
- Otis Armstrong
  1973 – 9th overall by the Denver Broncos
- Darryl Stingley
  1973 – 19th overall by the New England Patriots
- Gary Hrivnak
  1973 – 48th overall by the Chicago Bears
- Larry Burton
  1975 – 7th overall by the New Orleans Saints
- Mike Pruitt
  1976 – 7th overall by the Cleveland Browns
- Ken Novak
  1976 – 20th overall by the Baltimore Colts
- Ken Long
  1976 – 44th overall by the Detroit Lions
- Keena Turner
  1980 – 39th overall by the San Francisco 49ers
- Dave Young
  1981 – 32nd overall by the New York Giants
- Don Anderson
  1985 – 32nd overall by the Indianapolis Colts
- Jim Everett
  1986 – 3rd overall by the Houston Oilers
- Rod Woodson
  1987 – 10th overall by the Pittsburgh Steelers
- Fred Strickland
  1988 – 47th overall by the Los Angeles Rams
- Mike Alstott
  1996 – 35th overall by the Tampa Bay Buccaneers
- Drew Brees
  2001 – 32nd overall by the San Diego Chargers
- Matt Light
  2001 – 48th overall by the New England Patriots
- Anthony Spencer
  2007 – 26th overall by the Dallas Cowboys
- Dustin Keller
  2008 – 30th overall by the New York Jets
- Ryan Kerrigan
  2011 – 16th overall by the Washington Redskins
- Kawann Short
  2013 – 44th overall by the Carolina Panthers
- Rondale Moore
  2021 – 49th overall by the Arizona Cardinals
- George Karlaftis
  2022 – 30th overall by the Kansas City Chiefs

== Future conference opponents ==
Schedule announced October 4, 2023

2026	2027	2028
at Illinois*	at Maryland	at Illinois*
at Indiana*	at Nebraska	at Indiana*
at Iowa	at Ohio State	at Michigan State
at Penn State	at Oregon	at Rutgers
at UCLA	Illinois*	at USC
Maryland	Indiana*	Iowa
Minnesota	Michigan State	Michigan
Washington	Penn State	Nebraska
Wisconsin	UCLA	Northwestern

(*) denotes protected matchup

== Future non-conference opponents ==
Announced schedules as of November 3, 2026.

2027	2028	2029	2030	2031	2032	2033	2034
Albany	Western Illinois	UConn	at TCU	at North Carolina	Miami (OH)	at Ole Miss	Ole Miss
at West Virginia	at Wake Forest	at Vanderbilt			North Carolina		
Miami (OH)	Notre Dame	Indiana State					

== Radio network affiliates ==
City	Call Sign	Frequency
Anderson, Indiana	WHBU	1240 AM/101.1 FM
Bedford, Indiana	WBIW	1340 AM
Berne, Indiana	WZBD-FM	92.7 FM
Boonville, Indiana	WBNL	99.9 FM/1540 AM
Bremen, Indiana/South Bend, Indiana	WHPZ	96.9 FM
Dowagiac, Michigan	WHPD	92.1 FM
Evansville, Indiana	WGBF	1280 AM
Fort Wayne, Indiana	WKJG	100.9 FM/1380 AM
Hammond, Indiana	WJOB	1230 AM
Indianapolis, Indiana	WNDE	1260 AM
Jasper, Indiana	WQKZ-FM	98.5 FM
Knox, Indiana/Culver, Indiana	WKVI/WYMR-FM	1520 AM/99.3 FM/98.3 FM
Lafayette, Indiana	WAZY	96.5 FM
Louisville, Kentucky	WXVW	1450 AM
Marion, Indiana	WMRI	860 AM
Michigan City, Indiana	WEFM-FM	95.9 FM
Salem, Indiana	WSLM/WSLM-FM	1220 AM / 97.9 FM
Vincennes, Indiana	WFML-FM	96.7 FM
Winchester, Indiana	WZZY	98.3 FM

== See also ==
- American football in the United States
- College football
