= WSLM =

WSLM could refer to two radio stations in United States:

- WSLM (AM), a radio station broadcasting at 1220 kHz on the AM band, licensed to Salem, Indiana
- WSLM-FM, a radio station broadcasting at 97.9 MHz on the FM band, licensed to Salem, Indiana
