= Notre Dame–Purdue football rivalry =

American college football rivalry

- Notre Dame Fighting Irish Purdue Boilermakers
- First meeting: November 14, 1896; Purdue 28, Notre Dame 22
- Latest meeting: September 26, 2026; Notre Dame 49, Purdue 10
- Stadiums: Notre Dame Stadium; South Bend, Indiana, U.S. Ross–Ade Stadium; West Lafayette, Indiana, U.S.
- Trophy: None (1896–1956); Shillelagh Trophy (1957–present)

Statistics
- Total meetings: 90
- All-time series: Notre Dame leads, 60–26–2 (.693)
- Trophy series: Notre Dame leads, 41–19 (.683)
- Largest victory: Notre Dame, 66–7 (2024)
- Longest win streak: Notre Dame, 11 (1986–1996)
- Current win streak: Notre Dame, 9 (2008–present)

Locations of Purdue and Notre Dame

The Battle for the Shillelagh Trophy is an American college football rivalry between the Notre Dame Fighting Irish football team of the University of Notre Dame and Purdue Boilermakers football of Purdue University.

== Trophy ==
The Shillelagh Trophy is a trophy exchanged between Notre Dame and Purdue, being held by the winner of the game. The two in-state rivals first played each other in 1896. The game occurred annually from 1946 to 2014. The trophy, first presented in 1957, is a shillelagh donated by Joe McLaughlin, a merchant seaman and a Fighting Irish supporter who brought it from Ireland.

== Notable games ==
Notable games since 1946 include:

1950 – Purdue 28, Notre Dame 14
Notre Dame's 39-game unbeaten string came to an end at the hands of the Boilermakers. Future NFL QB Dale Samuels threw two touchdowns to defeat the Irish. The Irish finished 4–4–1, easily the worst season for head coach Frank Leahy.

1954 – #19 Purdue 27, #1 Notre Dame 14
The top-ranked Irish were beaten by their intrastate rival as their 13-game unbeaten streak ended. It was their only loss of the year as they finished 9–1 under new coach Terry Brennan.

1957 – Notre Dame 12, Purdue 0
A psychological ploy enabled the Irish, coming off their worst season in history at that point, to start off on the right foot. Purdue coach Jack Mollenkopf heard that Terry Brennan had installed the single wing after spending some time in Knoxville, and was not sure how to prepare for Notre Dame. As it turned out, the single wing was not used against the tentative Boilermakers.

1960 – Purdue 51, Notre Dame 19
Purdue set two records for Notre Dame opponents in this game that still stand: most points ever scored against the Fighting Irish in the second quarter (31) and the most points ever by an opponent in Notre Dame Stadium. It remains the only time the Irish have ever given up 50 points in a game at Notre Dame Stadium. It was the worst defeat for the Fighting Irish under coach Joe Kuharich and at the time, it was only the fourth time in which the Fighting Irish had ever given up 50 points in a game.

1964 – Notre Dame 34, Purdue 15
The Fighting Irish made a statement under new coach Ara Parseghian as they throttled the Boilermakers. Alan Page blocked a punt and returned it for a touchdown and defensive back Nick Rassas caught a touchdown pass late in the game.

1965 – Purdue 25, Notre Dame 21
In a seesaw battle, Purdue scored the winning touchdown late in the game. Bob Griese set a Notre Dame opponent record by completing 19 of 22 passes, a record that stood until 1991.

1966 – Notre Dame 26, Purdue 14
This game is best remembered for the debut of one of Notre Dame's greatest passing combinations – Terry Hanratty to Jim Seymour. Hanratty completed 16 of 24 passes for 304 yards and three touchdowns, all to Seymour, who had 13 receptions. The teams traded quick touchdowns early on when Purdue's Leroy Keyes grabbed an errant pitch out of the air and returned it 95 yards for a score, only to have Fighting Irish halfback Nick Eddy return the ensuing kickoff 97 yards for the equalizer. Notre Dame finished 9–0–1 and win the national championship while Purdue made its first trip to the Rose Bowl a memorable one, beating USC, 14–13. Purdue was allowed to go to the Rose Bowl because Michigan State's 9–0–1 record prevented the Spartans from repeating as Big Ten Champions and the Rose Bowl berth.

1967 – Purdue 28, Notre Dame 21
Once again, the top-ranked and defending national champion Fighting Irish were done in by the Boilermakers despite the efforts of Terry Hanratty, who completed 29 out of 63 attempts. The loss snapped a 12-game unbeaten streak by the Fighting Irish.

1968 – Purdue 37, Notre Dame 22
In the only #1 vs #2 matchup in the history of this rivalry, the top-ranked Boilermakers and quarterback Mike Phipps walloped the #2 Fighting Irish.

1970 – Notre Dame 48, Purdue 0
After three years of frustration, the Irish exploded all at once against the Boilermakers, holding them to 144 total yards and six first downs. Joe Theismann threw three touchdown passes to Tom Gatewood and Ara Parseghian was carried off the field after the game.

1971 – Notre Dame 8, Purdue 7
In a game played in the rain, the Fighting Irish, trailing 7–0, took advantage of a botched snap on a punt to score a touchdown late in the game, then executed a successful two-point conversion to win. It was their first win in West Lafayette since 1961.

1974 – Purdue 31, Notre Dame 20
A four-touchdown underdog, Purdue once again broke a Notre Dame winning streak and derailed any hope for the Fighting Irish to repeat as national champions by jumping out to a 24–0 lead in the first quarter, setting a record for most points scored against Notre Dame in the opening stanza. Boilermaker coach Alex Agase finally notched a victory against his close friend, Ara Parseghian.

1975 – Notre Dame 17, Purdue 0
Notre Dame led, 3–0 in the fourth quarter when Purdue threatened to take the lead. Luther Bradley's 99-yard interception return for a touchdown on a halfback-to-quarterback pass attempt broke the game open, and the Fighting Irish, who had played five days earlier and won, improved to 2–0 under new coach Dan Devine.

1977 – Notre Dame 31, Purdue 24
Notre Dame trailed, 24–14 in the fourth quarter when Joe Montana entered the game. Montana, who had not played since 1975, engineered a comeback victory and nailed down the starting quarterback job for the remainder of his Notre Dame career. The Fighting Irish, coming off a 20–13 loss to Ole Miss, did not lose the rest of the way and won the national championship.

1979 – Purdue 28, Notre Dame 22
Notre Dame, rotating three quarterbacks in place of the injured Rusty Lisch, took a 20–7 lead in the third quarter before Boilermaker quarterback Mark Herrmann came alive. Purdue took an intentional safety late in the game, downing the ball in its own end zone out of punt formation rather than risking a blocked punt.

1980 – Notre Dame 31, Purdue 10
The Irish opened Dan Devine's final season with an impressive win over the Boilermakers in a game that was moved up to September 6 to accommodate national television. Purdue quarterback Mark Herrmann did not play, having injured his throwing hand earlier in the week, and freshman Scott Campbell took his place. The Irish finished 9–2–1, losing to eventual national champion Georgia in the Sugar Bowl.

1981 – Purdue 15, Notre Dame 14
Purdue pulled this one out late in the game after the Fighting Irish had taken a 14–7 lead. It was the start of a pattern under new coach Gerry Faust, whose teams developed a knack for losing games in the closing moments.

1983 – Notre Dame 52, Purdue 6
Notre Dame could do no wrong as they rang up the highest point total by a Purdue opponent in Ross-Ade Stadium. Despite the impressive start, the Fighting Irish lost their last three games of the season to finish 6–5 before holding off Boston College in the Liberty Bowl.

1984 - Purdue 23, Notre Dame 21
Jim Everett clinched his first victory as the Purdue Quarterback over the Irish at the Hoosier Dome; the win marked the first season Purdue defeated Notre Dame, Michigan and Ohio State in the same season.

1986 – Notre Dame 41, Purdue 9
Lou Holtz notched his first victory as head coach of the Fighting Irish and the first of eleven straight wins against the Boilermakers.

1988 – Notre Dame 52, Purdue 7
En route to a national championship, Notre Dame took a 42–0 halftime lead and coasted the rest of the way. Irish coach Lou Holtz cleared the bench in the second half.

1997 – Purdue 28, Notre Dame 17
The Boilermakers ended their 11-game losing streak against the Fighting Irish in a matchup of new head coaches, Purdue's Joe Tiller and Notre Dame's Bob Davie. Tiller's predecessor, Jim Colletto, was now the offensive coordinator for the Fighting Irish.

1998 – Notre Dame 31, Purdue 30
Tony Driver's two interceptions late in the game enabled the Fighting Irish to squeak by Purdue. His first interception set up a game-winning field goal while the second moments later sealed the victory.

1999 – Purdue 28, Notre Dame 23
For the second week in a row, Notre Dame came up short as Fighting Irish quarterback Jarious Jackson was sacked on the game's final play with the Fighting Irish at the Purdue nine-yard line.

2000 – Notre Dame 23, Purdue 21
Nick Setta's field goal as time ran out lifted the Fighting Irish to a come-from-behind victory. Fighting Irish quarterback Gary Godsey, making his first start in place of the injured Arnaz Battle, outdueled Drew Brees.

2001 – Notre Dame 24, Purdue 18
This game was played on December 1, having been rescheduled after the September 11 attacks. The Fighting Irish finished a dismal season with a 5–6 record. It was Bob Davie's last game as head coach; he was fired the next day.

2002 – Notre Dame 24, Purdue 17
Notre Dame's defense and special teams accounted for all three touchdowns.

2004 – Purdue 41, Notre Dame 16
The Boilermakers notched their first win at Notre Dame Stadium since 1974 despite the efforts of Fighting Irish quarterback Brady Quinn, who set a stadium record by passing for 432 yards because they were playing from behind the entire game.

2009 – Notre Dame 24, Purdue 21
Fighting Irish quarterback Jimmy Clausen's touchdown pass to Kyle Rudolph with 24 seconds left lifted the Fighting Irish to a come-from-behind victory.

2010 – Notre Dame 23, Purdue 12
Coach Brian Kelly notched his first win as Notre Dame's coach by incorporating the spread offense and 3–4 defense. Dayne Crist makes his first start as Notre Dame's quarterback, throwing for 205 yards and 1 TD. On the other side of the ball, quarterback Robert Marve makes his debut for the Boilermakers after transferring from Miami (FL) throwing for 220 yards, 0 TDs, and 2 INTs.

2013 – Notre Dame 31, Purdue 24
The #21-ranked Irish came in to West Lafayette a 3-touchdown favorite over Purdue. Purdue took the ball to start the game and drove it 75 yards to score first. Purdue had a 10–0 lead before the Irish were able to make it 10–3 at halftime. The game went back and forth until up 24–17, Notre Dame picked off quarterback Rob Henry and took it to the house to go up 31–17 with 8 minutes left. The Boilermakers drove down the field and scored to get the game within 7. Purdue forced a Notre Dame fumble on the next drive, but could not take advantage of it as Notre Dame went on to win 31–24. However, this win was later vacated due to NCAA violations.

2024 – Notre Dame 66, Purdue 7
After a large upset loss against the Northern Illinois Huskies, the #18-ranked Irish came in to West Lafayette a 1-touchdown favorite over Purdue. Notre Dame took the ball to start the game and scored on its very first drive. Notre Dame continued scoring up to a 42–0 lead over Purdue at halftime. The game would ultimately end 66–7. The game was the largest margin of victory Notre Dame had over Purdue, the most points Purdue had ever given up in a game in program history, and was the largest Purdue home loss in program history. From there, the Irish subsequently built on this victory and eventually won their last 10 games of the season, and then won 3 College Football Playoff games to make it all the way to the National Championship Game, where they lost to Ohio State. On the other hand, Purdue never recovered from this game, and eventually ended the season on an 11-game losing streak and finished 1–11, which led to head coach Ryan Walters being fired after the season.

After the 2014 game, the annual series ended. The rivalry resumed in 2021 and will be an annual game from 2024 until at least 2028.

== Game results ==
Notre Dame victories	Purdue victories	Tie games	Vacated wins (Note: Notre Dame's wins in 2012 and 2013 were vacated as a result of NCAA sanctions against the Notre Dame football program issued on November 22, 2016, after the NCAA found that a student-trainer committed academic misconduct for two football players and provided six other players with impermissible academic extra benefits. The NCAA also rejected Notre Dame's appeal on February 13, 2018. This win is not included in Notre Dame's all-time record, nor is it counted in the series record between the two teams. See Wikipedia:WikiProject College football/Vacated victories for an explanation of how vacated victories are recorded.)

No.	Date	Location	Winner	Score
1	November 14, 1896	South Bend, IN	Purdue	28–22
2	November 18, 1899	West Lafayette, IN	Tie	10–10
3	November 9, 1901	South Bend, IN	Notre Dame	12–6
4	November 27, 1902	West Lafayette, IN	Tie	6–6
5	November 24, 1904	West Lafayette, IN	Purdue	36–0
6	November 24, 1905	West Lafayette, IN	Purdue	32–0
7	November 3, 1906	West Lafayette, IN	Notre Dame	2–0
8	November 23, 1907	West Lafayette, IN	Notre Dame	17–0
9	November 23, 1918	West Lafayette, IN	Notre Dame	26–6
10	November 22, 1919	West Lafayette, IN	Notre Dame	33–13
11	November 6, 1920	South Bend, IN	Notre Dame	28–0
12	October 15, 1921	West Lafayette, IN	Notre Dame	33–0
13	October 14, 1922	West Lafayette, IN	Notre Dame	20–0
14	November 3, 1923	South Bend, IN	Notre Dame	34–7
15	November 11, 1933	South Bend, IN	Purdue	19–0
16	October 13, 1934	South Bend, IN	Notre Dame	18–7
17	September 30, 1939	South Bend, IN	Notre Dame	3–0
18	October 12, 1946	South Bend, IN	#3 Notre Dame	49–6
19	October 11, 1947	West Lafayette, IN	#1 Notre Dame	49–6
20	September 25, 1948	South Bend, IN	Notre Dame	28–27
21	October 8, 1949	West Lafayette, IN	#2 Notre Dame	35–12
22	October 7, 1950	South Bend, IN	Purdue	35–12
23	October 27, 1951	South Bend, IN	#15 Notre Dame	30–9
24	October 18, 1952	West Lafayette, IN	Notre Dame	26–14
25	October 3, 1953	West Lafayette, IN	#1 Notre Dame	37–7
26	October 2, 1954	South Bend, IN	#19 Purdue	27–14
27	October 22, 1955	West Lafayette, IN	#11 Notre Dame	22–7
28	October 13, 1956	South Bend, IN	Purdue	28–14
29	September 28, 1957	West Lafayette, IN	Notre Dame	12–0
30	October 25, 1958	South Bend, IN	#15 Purdue	29–22
31	October 3, 1959	West Lafayette, IN	Purdue	28–7
32	October 1, 1960	South Bend, IN	Purdue	51–19
33	October 7, 1961	West Lafayette, IN	Notre Dame	22–20
34	October 6, 1962	South Bend, IN	Purdue	24–6
35	October 5, 1963	West Lafayette, IN	Purdue	7–6
36	October 3, 1964	South Bend, IN	#9 Notre Dame	34–15
37	September 25, 1965	West Lafayette, IN	#6 Purdue	25–21
38	September 24, 1966	South Bend, IN	#8 Notre Dame	26–14
39	September 30, 1967	West Lafayette, IN	#10 Purdue	28–21
40	September 28, 1968	South Bend, IN	#1 Purdue	37–22
41	September 27, 1969	West Lafayette, IN	#16 Purdue	28–14
42	September 26, 1970	South Bend, IN	#6 Notre Dame	48–0
43	September 25, 1971	West Lafayette, IN	#2 Notre Dame	8–7
44	September 30, 1972	South Bend, IN	#10 Notre Dame	35–14
45	September 29, 1973	West Lafayette, IN	#7 Notre Dame	20–7
46	September 28, 1974	South Bend, IN	Purdue	31–20

No.	Date	Location	Winner	Score
47	September 20, 1975	West Lafayette, IN	#9 Notre Dame	17–0
48	September 18, 1976	South Bend, IN	Notre Dame	23–0
49	September 24, 1977	West Lafayette, IN	#11 Notre Dame	31–24
50	September 30, 1978	South Bend, IN	Notre Dame	10–6
51	September 22, 1979	West Lafayette, IN	#17 Purdue	28–22
52	September 6, 1980	South Bend, IN	#11 Notre Dame	31–10
53	September 26, 1981	West Lafayette, IN	Purdue	15–14
54	September 25, 1982	South Bend, IN	#10 Notre Dame	28–14
55	September 10, 1983	West Lafayette, IN	#5 Notre Dame	52–6
56	September 8, 1984	Indianapolis, IN	Purdue	23–21
57	September 28, 1985	West Lafayette, IN	Purdue	35–17
58	September 27, 1986	South Bend, IN	Notre Dame	41–9
59	September 26, 1987	West Lafayette, IN	#8 Notre Dame	44–20
60	September 24, 1988	South Bend, IN	#8 Notre Dame	52–7
61	September 30, 1989	West Lafayette, IN	#1 Notre Dame	40–7
62	September 29, 1990	South Bend, IN	#1 Notre Dame	37–11
63	September 28, 1991	West Lafayette, IN	#8 Notre Dame	45–20
64	September 26, 1992	South Bend, IN	#6 Notre Dame	48–0
65	September 25, 1993	West Lafayette, IN	#4 Notre Dame	17–0
66	September 24, 1994	South Bend, IN	#9 Notre Dame	39–21
67	September 9, 1995	West Lafayette, IN	#25 Notre Dame	35–28
68	September 14, 1996	South Bend, IN	#9 Notre Dame	35–0
69	September 13, 1997	West Lafayette, IN	Purdue	28–17
70	September 26, 1998	South Bend, IN	#23 Notre Dame	31–30
71	September 11, 1999	West Lafayette, IN	#20 Purdue	28–23
72	September 16, 2000	South Bend, IN	#21 Notre Dame	23–21
73	December 1, 2001	West Lafayette, IN	Notre Dame	24–18
74	September 7, 2002	South Bend, IN	#23 Notre Dame	24–17
75	September 27, 2003	West Lafayette, IN	#22 Purdue	23–10
76	October 2, 2004	South Bend, IN	#15 Purdue	41–16
77	October 1, 2005	West Lafayette, IN	#13 Notre Dame	49–28
78	September 30, 2006	South Bend, IN	#12 Notre Dame	35–21
79	September 29, 2007	West Lafayette, IN	Purdue	33–19
80	September 27, 2008	South Bend, IN	Notre Dame	38–21
81	September 26, 2009	West Lafayette, IN	Notre Dame	24–21
82	September 4, 2010	South Bend, IN	Notre Dame	23–12
83	October 1, 2011	West Lafayette, IN	Notre Dame	38–10
84	September 8, 2012	South Bend, IN	#22 Notre Dame^{†}	20–17
85	September 14, 2013	West Lafayette, IN	#21 Notre Dame^{†}	31–24
86	September 13, 2014	Indianapolis, IN	#11 Notre Dame	30–14
87	September 18, 2021	South Bend, IN	#12 Notre Dame	27–13
88	September 14, 2024	West Lafayette, IN	#18 Notre Dame	66–7
89	September 20, 2025	South Bend, IN	#24 Notre Dame	56–30
90	September 26, 2026	West Lafayette, IN	#3 Notre Dame	49–10
Series: Notre Dame leads 60–26–2
† Vacated by Notre Dame

== See also ==
- List of NCAA college football rivalry games
