= WYMR =

WYMR may refer to:

- WYMR (FM), a radio station (98.3 FM) licensed to serve Culver, Indiana, United States
- WJTW, a radio station (1480 AM) licensed to serve Bridgeport, Alabama, United States, which held the call sign WYMR from 2001 to 2007
- WWLL, a radio station (105.7 FM) licensed to serve Sebring, Florida, United States, which held the call sign WYMR from 1995 to 1998
