= Johnny Gramling =

American football player (1932–2017)

No. 83
- Position: Quarterback

Personal information
- Born: 1932
- Died: January 13, 2017 (aged 84–85); Orangeburg, South Carolina, U.S.
- Listed height: 6 ft 0 in (1.83 m)
- Listed weight: 175 lb (79 kg)

Career information
- High school: Orangeburg
- College: South Carolina (1950–1953)
- NFL draft: 1954: 24th round, 288th overall pick

Career history
- Ottawa Rough Riders (1954)

Awards and highlights
- First-team All-Southern (1952); First-team All-ACC (1953)

John Gramling (1932 – January 13, 2017) was an American professional football quarterback who played for the Ottawa Rough Riders of the Interprovincial Rugby Football Union (IRFU). He played college football for the South Carolina Gamecocks, and was selected by the Cleveland Browns in the 24th round of the 1954 NFL draft.

== Early life ==
John Gramling was born in 1932. He played high school football at Orangeburg High School in Orangeburg, South Carolina.

== College career ==
Gramling was a three-year football letterman for the South Carolina Gamecocks from 1951 to 1953. In 1950, he quarterbacked South Carolina's freshman team to a winning season. He was a part-time starter on the varsity team in 1951. Gramling took over as the full-time starter his junior year in 1952, completing 61 of 144 passes for a new school record of 709 yards. He earned United Press (UP) first-team All-Southern Conference honors for his performance during the 1952 season. The next year, he completed 68 of 132 passes for 1,045 yards, garnering UP first-team All-Atlantic Coast Conference (ACC) and Associated Press second-team All-ACC recognition. Gramling finished his college career with school records in both career passing yards (2,007) and career passing touchdowns (18). He was also a two-year letterman in baseball as a pitcher from 1952 to 1953. Gramling was inducted into the University of South Carolina Athletics Hall of Fame in 2000.

== Professional career ==
Gramling was the starting quarterback for the East team in the 1954 East–West Shrine Game. He completed 11 of 22 passes for 114 yards, one touchdown, and four interceptions as the East lost by a score of 31–7.

Gramling was selected by the Cleveland Browns in the 24th round, with the 288th overall pick, of the 1954 NFL draft. However, he instead signed with the Ottawa Rough Riders of the Interprovincial Rugby Football Union on March 3, 1954. Gramling beat out Don Panciera and Dale Samuels for the Rough Riders' starting quarterback job. On September 17, it was reported that Gramling, who was a lieutenant in the United States Air Force Reserve, had been ordered to report for duty on September 30. The Rough Riders requested that Gramling be allowed to finish the 1954 season but it was denied. Gramling played in six games overall for Ottawa during the 1954 season, completing 51 of 98 passes (52.0%) for 652 yards, two touchdowns, and 12 interceptions while also rushing 24 times for 117 yards and one touchdown. He played for Shaw Air Force Base's football team while in the military.

== Personal life ==
Gramling later became a farmer and businessman. He was married to former Miss USA and Miss World 1956 contestant Betty Lane Cherry. He died on January 13, 2017, in Orangeburg.
