= David Hedelin =

Swedish-born American football player (born 1991)

Carl David Hedelin
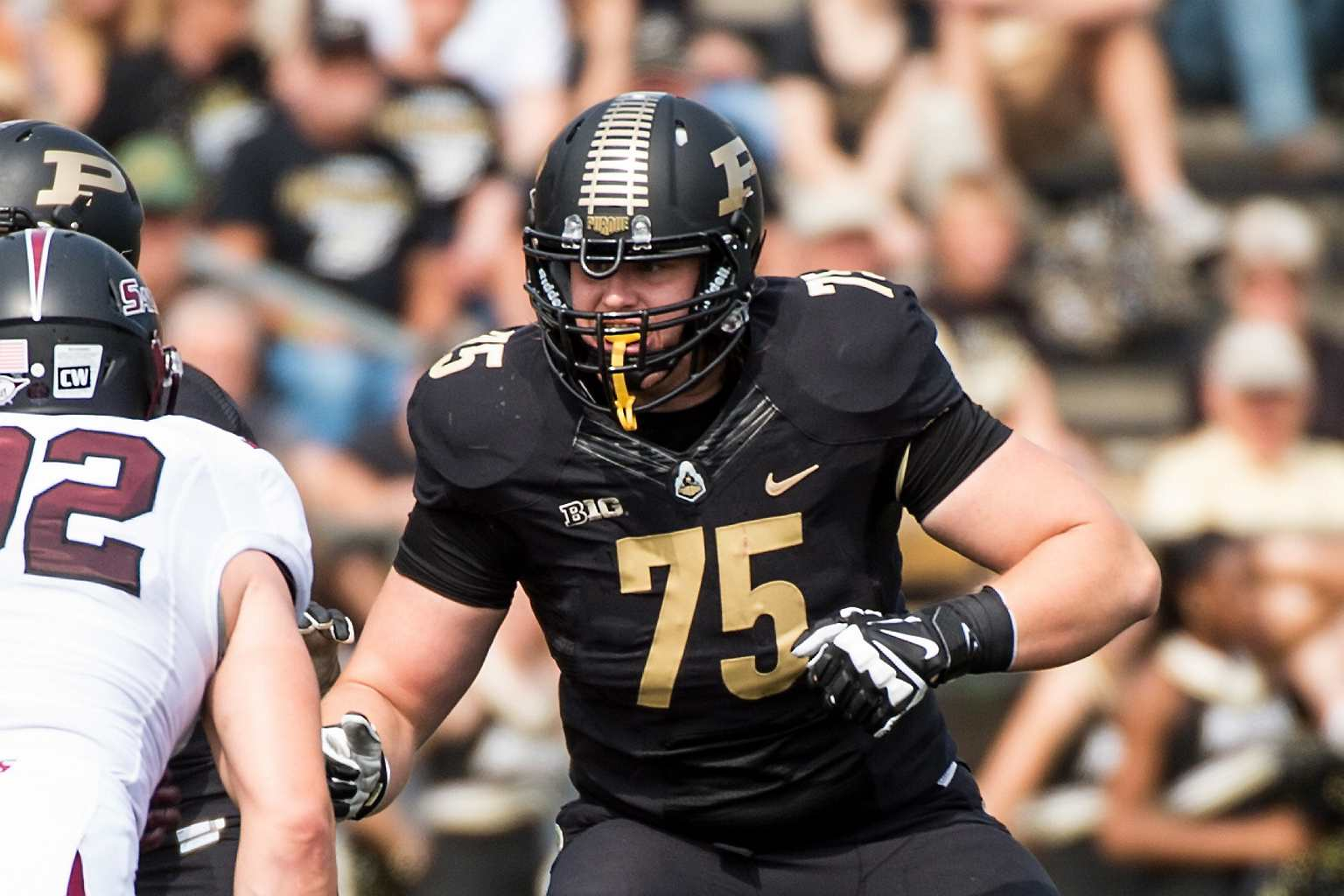
- Hedelin with the Purdue Boilermakers

Profile
- Position: Offensive tackle

Personal information
- Born: March 16, 1991 (age 35); Stockholm, Sweden
- Listed height: 6 ft 5 in (1.96 m)
- Listed weight: 305 lb (138 kg)

Career information
- College: City College of San Francisco (2012–2013); Purdue (2014–2015)
- NFL draft: 2016: undrafted

Career history
- Dallas Cowboys (2016)*; Limhamn Griffins (2017)
- * Offseason or practice squad member only

Carl David Hedelin (born March 16, 1991) is a Swedish former American football offensive tackle. He played club football for Swedish team Tyresö Royal Crowns and college football at Purdue University.

== College career ==
Hedelin played at the City College of San Francisco in 2012 and 2013. After the 2013 season, Hedelin accepted a scholarship to continue playing football for the Purdue Boilermakers football team. Hedelin was suspended by the NCAA during the first 3 games of his Purdue career, due to his playing for the Valencia Firebats of Liga Nacional de Fútbol Americano.

== Professional career ==
In the 2016 draft, Hedelin went undrafted but was later signed as an undrafted free agent by the Dallas Cowboys. He was waived on July 26, 2016.
