= WKVI =

WKVI and WKVI-FM
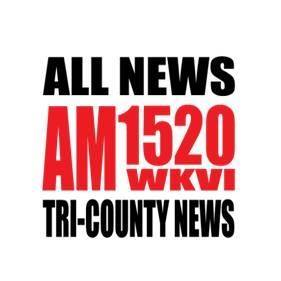

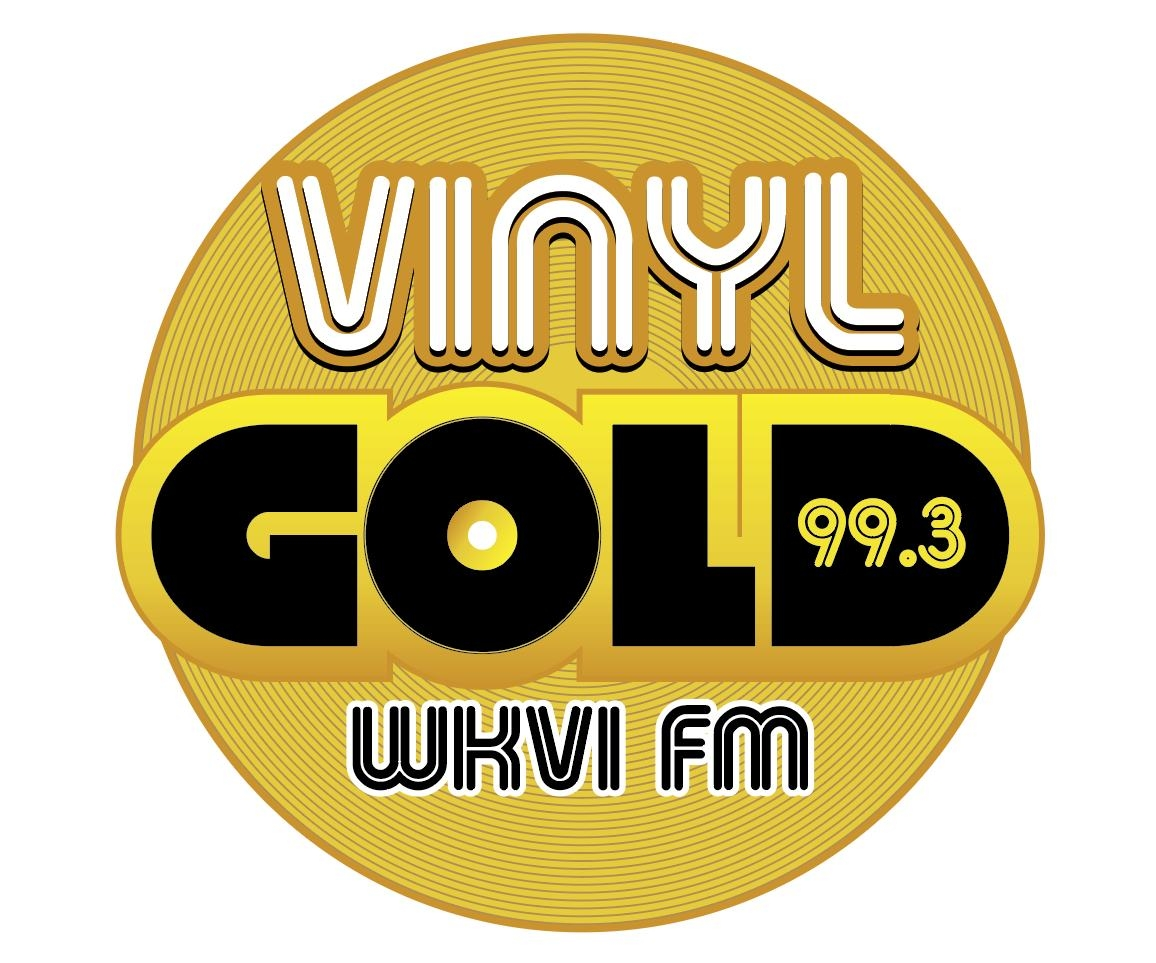

Knox, Indiana; United States
- Broadcast area: Starke and Pulaski Counties, North Central Indiana, South Bend market
- Frequencies: WKVI: 1520 kHz; WKVI-FM: 99.3 MHz
- Branding: WKVI: All News AM 1520; WKVI-FM: Vinyl Gold

Programming
- Format: WKVI: All news; WKVI-FM: Oldies
- Affiliations: WKVI: ABC News Radio; WKVI-FM: Fox News Radio

Ownership
- Owner: Kankakee Valley Broadcasting Company, Inc.
- Sister stations: WYMR

History
- First air date: WKVI: July 21, 1959
- Call sign meaning: Kankakee Valley, Indiana

Technical information
- Licensing authority: FCC
- Facility ID: WKVI: 33325; WKVI-FM: 33328
- Class: WKVI: D; WKVI-FM: A
- Power: WKVI: 1,800 watts (daytime); 350 watts critical hours
- ERP: WKVI-FM: 3,300 watts
- HAAT: WKVI-FM: 84 meters (276 ft)
- Transmitter coordinates: WKVI: 41°19′17.8″N 86°36′21.4″W

Links
- Public license information: WKVI: Public file; LMS; WKVI-FM: Public file; LMS
- Website: wkvi.com

WKVI-FM (99.3 MHz) and WKVI (1520 kHz) are radio stations licensed to Knox, Indiana and are owned by Kankakee Valley Broadcasting Company, Incorporated.

Vinyl Gold 99.3 WKVI-FM plays an oldies format featuring hourly local news, AG news, Fox News, Accuweather, and High School sports covering 7 schools

All News AM 1520 WKVI plays local news, ABC News, AP News, state news from Network Indiana and Accuweather. The station(s) serve the Kankakee Valley area of North Central Indiana on the southern fringe of the South Bend market. The company also operates an active website and Facebook page.

During 2014, KVB Co., Inc. built a Class A FM station, with a full-time power of 6,000 watts, licensed to Culver, IN under a Construction Permit (CP) issued by the FCC. The station is known as MAX 98.3 FM WYMR and is currently on-the-air.

Former logos

== History ==
WKVI first went live on July 21, 1969. Harold Welter, previously working at a radio station in Laporte, IN, was manager and reported the on-air news. Ted Hayes, hired by Mr. Welter in June of '69, played the music.

The original WKVI team also included:

- Bob Densmore- Engineer,
- Becky Keys- Secretary,
- Harvey Allen- Disc Jockey,
- Bill Harvey- Disc Jockey,
- Joe Steiner- News Director.

In early November 2014, WKVI-FM received the Spectrum Award as Station of the Year (Market 3) from the Indiana Broadcasters Association.

On September 5, 2022, WKVI-FM changed its format to oldies as "Vinyl Gold", focusing on music released between 1964 and 1975 flanking sister classic hits station WYMR, which plays music in the 1970s and the 1980s.

== Current staff ==
- General manager/Mid-days - Lenny Dessauer
- News Director/News Anchor - Anita Goodan
- WKVI Morning Show -Rich Wallen
- Afternoons - Lenny Dessauer
- Sports director - Mitch Columbe
- Office Manager - Chris Milner
- General Sales Manager/Consultant - Rich Wallen
- Marketing director/Trip Coordinator - Lenny Dessauer

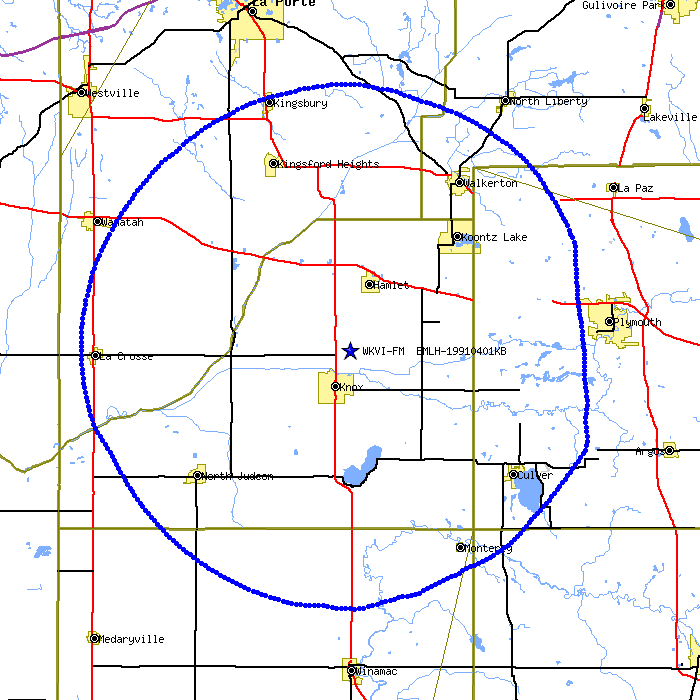
WKVI-FM Service Area Map
