= 1940 NFL All-Star Game =

1940 NFL All-Star Game may refer to:

- 1940 NFL All-Star Game (January), played after the conclusion of the 1939 NFL season
- 1940 NFL All-Star Game (December), played after the conclusion of the 1940 NFL season
