= Dale Samuels =

American football player (born 1931)

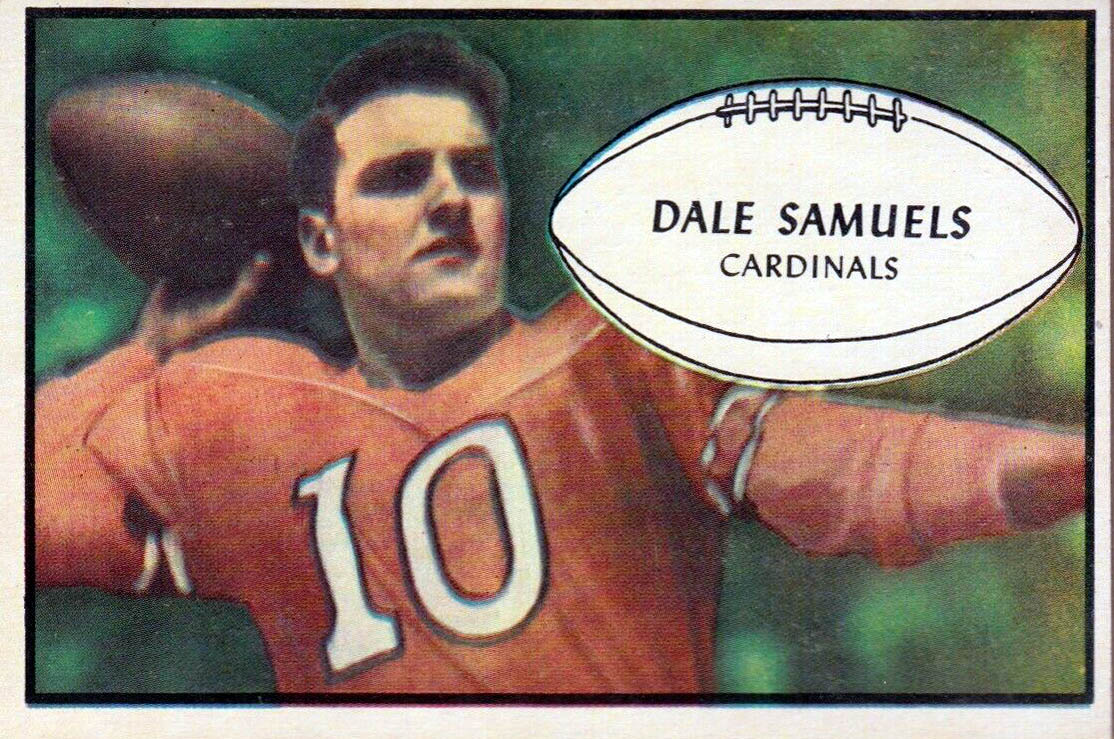
- Samuels on a 1953 Bowman football card

Profile
- Position: Quarterback

Personal information
- Born: August 2, 1931 (age 95); Chicago, Illinois, U.S.
- Listed height: 5 ft 9 in (1.75 m)
- Listed weight: 175 lb (79 kg)

Career information
- High school: Lindblom Technical (Chicago)
- College: Purdue (1949–1952)
- NFL draft: 1953: 3rd round, 28th overall pick

Career history
- Chicago Cardinals (1953); Ottawa Rough Riders (1954)*
- * Offseason or practice squad member only

Dale Allen Samuels (born August 2, 1931) is an American former football quarterback. He played college football for the Purdue Boilermakers and was selected by the Chicago Cardinals in the third round of the 1953 NFL draft.

== Early life ==
Dale Allen Samuels was born on August 2, 1931, in Chicago, Illinois. For high school, he attended Lindblom Technical High School in Chicago.

== College career ==
Samuels played college football for the Purdue Boilermakers of Purdue University. He was on the freshman team in 1949. He was then a three-year starter and letterman from 1950 to 1952. He was the first Boilermaker to record 1,000 passing yards in a season when he threw for 1,076 yards in 1950. In his second game for the Boilermakers on October 7, 1950, he helped Purdue defeat the Notre Dame Fighting Irish and end their 39-game undefeated streak. The Boilermakers won the Big Ten co-championship his senior year in 1952. He recorded college career totals of 3,161 passing yards and 27 touchdowns. Samuels played in the Chicago Charities College All-Star Game and North–South Shrine Game after his senior year.

Samuels was inducted into the Purdue Intercollegiate Athletics Hall of Fame in 2001. He was inducted into the Indiana Football Hall of Fame in 2018. Upon being inducted in 2018, Samuels stated "If you would have told me in 1948 before my senior year of high school that I would be standing here today being inducted into the (Hall of Fame) I would have questioned your sanity. No one in my family went to college."

== Professional career ==
Samuels was selected by the Chicago Cardinals in the third round, with the 28th overall pick, of the 1953 NFL draft. He did not play during the regular season opener on September 27, and was then released by the Cardinals on September 29, 1953.

In 1954, Samuels signed with the Ottawa Rough Riders of the Interprovincial Rugby Football Union. However, he was later released after being beat out by Johnny Gramling.

== Post-playing career ==
Samuels was an assistant football coach at Northwestern University in the late 1950s. He then held the following positions at Purdue; assistant football coach for five years; administrative assistant to the head football coach for ten years, and associate athletics director for 13 years. He retired in 1995 as the Associate Athletics Director for Facilities.

Samuels was also a color commentator for Purdue football radio broadcasts.
