= WSLM-FM =

- Salem, Indiana; United States
- Frequency: 97.9 MHz
- Branding: 97.9 FM Home of the IU Hoosiers

Programming
- Format: News and sports
- Affiliations: Indianapolis Colts Radio Network

Ownership
- Owner: Rebecca L. White
- Sister stations: WSLM; WRLW-CD

History
- First air date: 1992
- Call sign meaning: Salem

Technical information
- Licensing authority: FCC
- Facility ID: 55319
- Class: A
- ERP: 6,000 watts
- HAAT: 100 meters (330 ft)
- Transmitter coordinates: 38°38′7″N 86°10′37″W

Links
- Public license information: Public file; LMS
- Website: www.wslmradio.com

WSLM-FM (97.9 FM) is a classic rock, news, and sports radio station licensed to serve the community of Salem, Indiana as well as 21 other counties in the Southern Indiana/Louisville, Kentucky market.

WSLM-FM broadcasts from newly renovated digital studios located in Salem, Indiana. It is licensed to Rebecca L. White.

== Programming ==
Currently WSLM-FM is programmed with news and sports format and also holds market-exclusive rights to broadcast Indiana University Sports, Indianapolis Sports, Big Ten Basketball. The station is also the Kentuckiana Home of the Indianapolis Colts as well as all three divisions of NASCAR Racing as well as Indy Car races. White also added the syndicated morning show Rick & Bubba to the station in mid-2013 and continues to broadcast her own long-running morning segment “Coffee Club”.

WSLM-FM is a member of the IHSAA Championship Radio Network and airs coverage of IHSAA Network Football and Boys' and Girls' Basketball. WSLM-FM also carries Indiana Sports talk from Network Indiana.

WSLM-FM is also an affiliate of the Indiana Hoosier Network and Indianapolis Colts Radio Network airing Indiana Football and Basketball games and respective coaches shows and Indianapolis Colts gameday coverage.

WSLM-FM is also the only radio station in the Louisville and Southern Indiana market airing all NASCAR Sprint Cup, Nationwide and Truck Series races as well as selected races from the Indy Racing League.

The station was first licensed as WDHM in 1992, and became WSLM-FM in 1993, replacing the previous WSLM-FM 98.9 that had moved to the Louisville metropolitan area.
