= WYMR (FM) =

- Culver, Indiana; United States
- Broadcast area: Marshall County, Indiana; Starke County, Indiana
- Frequency: 98.3 MHz
- Branding: MAX 98.3

Programming
- Format: Classic hits
- Affiliations: AP News

Ownership
- Owner: Kankakee Valley Broadcasting Company, Inc.
- Sister stations: WKVI

History
- First air date: February 6, 2015

Technical information
- Licensing authority: FCC
- Facility ID: 190232
- Class: A
- ERP: 6,000 watts
- HAAT: 95 meters (312 ft)

Links
- Public license information: Public file; LMS
- Website: www.max983.net

WYMR (98.3 MHz) is an FM radio station licensed to the town of Culver, Indiana. It is owned by Kankakee Valley Broadcasting Company and airs a classic hits format branded as "MAX 98.3 FM".
