= WSLM (AM) =

- Salem, Indiana; United States
- Frequency: 1220 kHz
- Branding: WSLM 97.9 FM 1220 AM

Programming
- Format: News; sports; country

Ownership
- Owner: Rebecca L. White; (Salem Media LLC)
- Sister stations: WSLM-FM; WRLW-CD

History
- First air date: February 14, 1953
- Call sign meaning: Salem

Technical information
- Licensing authority: FCC
- Facility ID: 17153
- Class: D
- Power: 5,000 watts day; 82 watts night
- Transmitter coordinates: 38°36′55″N 86°5′10″W
- Repeater: WSLM-FM

Links
- Public license information: Public file; LMS
- Website: wslmradio.com

WSLM (1220 kHz) is a full service AM radio station licensed to serve the community of Salem, Indiana. Programming consists of country, news and sports. The station is owned and operated by Rebecca L. White. WSLM is a Kentuckiana affiliate for the Purdue Boilermakers and the Cincinnati Reds. There is a sister station, WSLM-FM. Rebecca L. White holds the license to the FM station as well. On June 2, 2014, WSLM became the new Kentuckiana home of the Rick and Bubba radio morning show. The station is also a member of the Country Music Association as well as the Indiana Broadcasters Association.

AM 1220 celebrated its Diamond Anniversary in 2013. On February 14, White held a birthday party on the radio by giving away $60 per hour in honor of the 60th anniversary of the station, as well as playing archival audio of station founder Don Martin, old WSLM commercials, programming and clips from Broomsage Ballet, recorded from 1972.

WSLM began broadcasting in C-QUAM AM stereo in September 2012.

== Programming ==
WSLM AM came on the air in 1953, after a minor glitch—the station was broken into Christmas Eve 1952 and thieves cleaned it out. When station owner Don Martin came in on Christmas morning to turn on the station for all of Southern Indiana to enjoy—he couldn't. The equipment was gone.

"It was nice of them to make us tracks into the station," he later said.

In describing the story to the local press, Martin quipped that the station had equipment "most preferred by thieves." This comment along with the story made headlines distributed by the Associated Press.

Authorities tracked the equipment to near Cincinnati, Ohio where the young men were operating a pirate radio station. They were set up in a quonset hut.

Once the equipment was returned (in good shape), Martin restored the station to full capacity and was able to begin broadcasting on Valentine's Day 1953.

Consequently, the Associated Press carried the story naming the station "The Sweetheart Station of the Nation."

Notable local programming on WSLM-FM and WRLW-CD TV which is simulcast on WSLM AM, is Coffee Club, Blue Sky Church, four daily newscasts, Ag and market reports, Swap Shop, a trading program airing twice daily and Texas Ed's bluegrass show on weekday afternoons. The station also airs, by default, IU and Purdue broadcasts, as well as local high school football and basketball games.

Another local program called "Trivia" which is actually the Saturday edition of Coffee Club, airs on Saturday mornings offering listeners a chance to call in and win either a WSLM T-shirt or a Christian music CD by answering a trivia question on secular items and from the Bible.
