= 1999 Purdue Boilermakers football team =

American college football season

1999 Purdue Boilermakers football

Outback Bowl, L 25-28 ^{OT} vs. Georgia
- Conference: Big Ten Conference

Ranking
- AP: No. 25
- Record: 7–5 (4–4 Big Ten)
- Head coach: Joe Tiller (3rd season)
- Offensive coordinator: Jim Chaney (3rd season)
- Offensive scheme: Spread
- Defensive coordinator: Brock Spack (3rd season)
- Base defense: 4–3
- Captains: Adrian Beasley; Drew Brees
- Home stadium: Ross–Ade Stadium

1999 Big Ten Conference football standings
	Conf.			Overall
Team	W		L	W		L
No. 4 Wisconsin $	7	–	1	10	–	2
No. 7 Michigan State	6	–	2	10	–	2
No. 5 Michigan %	6	–	2	10	–	2
No. 11 Penn State	5	–	3	10	–	3
No. 18 Minnesota	5	–	3	8	–	4
No. 24 Illinois	4	–	4	8	–	4
No. 25 Purdue	4	–	4	7	–	5
Ohio State	3	–	5	6	–	6
Indiana	3	–	5	4	–	7
Northwestern	1	–	7	3	–	8
Iowa	0	–	8	1	–	10
$ – BCS representative as conference champion; % – BCS at-large representative; Rankings from AP Poll

The 1999 Purdue Boilermakers football team represented Purdue University during the 1999 NCAA Division I-A football season. They played their home games at Ross–Ade Stadium in West Lafayette, Indiana and were members of the Big Ten Conference.

== Schedule ==
Date	Time	Opponent	Rank	Site	TV	Result	Attendance	Source
September 4	6:00 pm	at UCF*	No. 22	Florida Citrus Bowl; Orlando, FL	ESPN Plus	W 47–13	40,112	
September 11	2:30 pm	No. 16 Notre Dame*	No. 20	Ross–Ade Stadium; West Lafayette, IN (rivalry)	ABC	W 28–23	69,843	
September 18	11:00 am	Central Michigan*	No. 14	Ross–Ade Stadium; West Lafayette, IN	ESPN Plus	W 58–16	58,349	
September 25	11:00 am	Northwestern	No. 13	Ross–Ade Stadium; West Lafayette, IN	ESPN2	W 31–23	58,620	
October 2	11:00 am	at No. 4 Michigan	No. 11	Michigan Stadium; Ann Arbor, MI	ESPN	L 12–38	111,468	
October 9	2:30 pm	at No. 21 Ohio State	No. 17	Ohio Stadium; Columbus, OH	ABC	L 22–25	93,766	
October 16	2:30 pm	No. 5 Michigan State^{†}	No. 20	Ross–Ade Stadium; West Lafayette, IN	ABC	W 52–28	68,216	
October 23	2:30 pm	No. 2 Penn State	No. 16	Ross–Ade Stadium; West Lafayette, IN	ABC	L 25–31	68,355	
October 30	12:00 pm	at Minnesota	No. 18	Hubert H. Humphrey Metrodome; Minneapolis, MN	ESPN	W 33–28	48,869	
November 6	3:30 pm	No. 10 Wisconsin	No. 17	Ross–Ade Stadium; West Lafayette, IN	ABC	L 21–28	67,308	
November 20	12:00 pm	at Indiana	No. 19	Memorial Stadium; Bloomington, IN (Old Oaken Bucket)	ESPN	W 30–24	51,344	
January 1	11:00 am	vs. No. 21 Georgia*	No. 19	Raymond James Stadium; Tampa, FL (Outback Bowl)	ESPN	L 25–28 ^{OT}	54,059	
*Non-conference game; ^{†}Homecoming; Rankings from AP Poll released prior to the game; All times are in Eastern time

== Rankings ==
Ranking movements Legend: ██ Increase in ranking ██ Decrease in ranking — = Not ranked т = Tied with team above or below
	Week																
Poll	Pre	1	2	3	4	5	6	7	8	9	10	11	12	13	14	15	Final
AP	23	22	20	14	13	11	17	20	16	18	17	22	19	19	19	19	25
Coaches Poll	23	23*	16	14	11	10	15T	21	17	22	21	—	25	23	20	20	—
BCS	Not released									—	—	—	—	—	—	—	Not released

== Game summaries ==
=== Notre Dame ===
Team	1	2	3	4	Total
Notre Dame	10	6	7	0	23
• Purdue	7	7	8	6	28

- Date: September 11
- Location: Ross–Ade Stadium, West Lafayette, IN
- Game attendance: 69,843
- TV announcers (ABC): Brent Musburger, Dan Fouts & Jack Arute
- Source: USA Today

Scoring summary
1	Notre Dame	Sanson 20-yard field goal	Notre Dame 3-0
1	Notre Dame	Jackson 15-yard run (Sanson kick)	Notre Dame 10-0
1	Purdue	Brees 9-yard run (Dorsch kick)	Notre Dame 10-7
2	Notre Dame	Jackson 1-yard run (kick failed)	Notre Dame 16-7
2	Purdue	Lane 30-yard pass from Brees (Dorsch kick)	Notre Dame 16-14
3	Purdue	Crabtree 1-yard run (Brees run)	Purdue 22-16
3	Notre Dame	Brown 7-yard pass from Jackson (Sanson kick)	Notre Dame 23-22
4	Purdue	Dorsch 38-yard field goal	Purdue 25-23
4	Purdue	Dorsch 28-yard field goal	Purdue 28-23

=== Indiana ===
Team	1	2	3	4	Total
• Purdue	9	8	6	7	30
Indiana	14	3	7	0	24

- Date: November 20
- Location: Memorial Stadium, Bloomington, IN
- Game start: 12:00 p.m. EST
- Elapsed time: 3:20
- Game attendance: 51,344
- Game weather: Clear; 46 °F (8 °C); wind 5–10 mph (8.0–16.1 km/h) W
- Referee: Jim Lapentina
- TV announcers (ESPN): Dave Barnett, Bill Curry & Dave Ryan

Scoring summary
Q1	11:07	IND	Graham 36 yard pass from Randle El (Payne kick)	IND 7–0
Q1	6:31	PUR	Okobi recovered fumble in end zone (Dorsch kick)	Tie 7–7
Q1	3:32	IND	Randle El 1 yard run (Payne kick)	IND 14–7
Q1	1:27	PUR	Safety, Randle El tackled by Beasley in end zone	IND 14–9
Q2	5:01	PUR	Lowe 1 yard run (Sutherland pass from Brees)	PUR 17–14
Q2	:15	IND	Payne 24 yard field goal	Tie 17–17
Q3	11:51	PUR	Dorsch 41 yard field goal	PUR 20–17
Q3	5:04	IND	Hogan 7 yard run (Payne kick)	IND 24–20
Q3	1:03	PUR	Dorsch 19 yard field goal	IND 24–23
Q4	14:32	PUR	Sutherland 66 yard punt return (Dorsch kick)	PUR 30–24

== Roster ==
1999 Purdue Boilermakers football team roster
Players
Coaches
Offense

Pos.	#	Name	Class
QB	15	Drew Brees	Jr
RB		Sedrick Brown
RB		J Crabtree
WR		Chris Daniels
WR		Keith Dawson
QB		David Edgerton
OT	77	Brandon Gorin	Jr
WR		Cliff Jackson
WR		Chris James
WR		Randall Lane
OT	78	Matt Light	Jr
RB		Montrell Lowe
WR		Seth Morales
OL		Gene Mruczkowski
OL		Jim Niedrach
OL		Chukky Okobi
TE		Chris Randolph
QB		Mike Segard
WR		A. T. Simpson
TE		Tim Stratton
WR	14	Vinny Sutherland	Jr
WR		Robert Tolbert
WR		Donald Winston

Defense

Pos.	#	Name	Class
DB		DaShann Austin
LB	13	Akin Ayodele	So
DB		Adrian Beasley
DB		Chris Clopton
DB		Lamar Conard
DL		Brian Dinkins
DB		James Dunnigan
LB		Willie Fells
DB		Michael Hawthorne
LB		Jason Loerzel
DL		Matt Mitrione
DB		Antoine Neal
DL		David Nugent
LB		Joe Odom
LB		Mike Rose
DB		Ben Smith
DB		Ralph Turner

Special teams

Pos.	#	Name	Class
K		Travis Dorsch
KR		Pete Lougheed
P		Danny Rogers
KR		Larry Shyne

Head coach

- Joe Tiller

Coordinators/assistant coaches

- Jim Chaney (offensive coordinator)
- Scott Downing
- Tim Burke (defensive backs)
- Danny Hope (offensive line)
- Randy Melvin (defensive ends)
- Greg Olson (quarterbacks)
- Kevin Sumlin (wide receivers)

Legend

- (C) Team captain
- (S) Suspended
- (I) Ineligible
- Injured
- Redshirt

== Awards ==
- All-Americans: Drew Brees (Playboy, Preseason)
- All-Big Ten: Akin Ayodele (2nd), Adrian Beasley (2nd), Drew Brees (1st), Chris Daniels (1st), Matt Light (2nd), Dave Nugent (2nd), Tim Stratton (1st)
- Team MVP: Chris Daniels
