= 2000 Purdue Boilermakers football team =

American college football season

2000 Purdue Boilermakers football

Big Ten co-champion

Rose Bowl, L 24–34 vs. Washington
- Conference: Big Ten Conference

Ranking
- Coaches: No. 13
- AP: No. 13
- Record: 8–4 (6–2 Big Ten)
- Head coach: Joe Tiller (4th season)
- Offensive coordinator: Jim Chaney (4th season)
- Offensive scheme: Spread
- Defensive coordinator: Brock Spack (4th season)
- Base defense: 4–3
- MVP: Drew Brees
- Captains: Akin Ayodele; Drew Brees
- Home stadium: Ross–Ade Stadium

2000 Big Ten Conference football standings
	Conf.			Overall
Team	W		L	W		L
No. 11 Michigan +	6	–	2	9	–	3
Northwestern +	6	–	2	8	–	4
No. 13 Purdue $+	6	–	2	8	–	4
Ohio State	5	–	3	8	–	4
No. 23 Wisconsin	4	–	4	9	–	4
Minnesota	4	–	4	6	–	6
Penn State	4	–	4	5	–	7
Iowa	3	–	5	3	–	9
Illinois	2	–	6	5	–	6
Michigan State	2	–	6	5	–	6
Indiana	2	–	6	3	–	8
$ – BCS representative as conference champion; + – Conference co-champions; Rankings from AP Poll

The 2000 Purdue Boilermakers football team represented Purdue University as a member of the Big Ten Conference during the 2000 NCAA Division I-A football season. In their fourth year under head coach Joe Tiller, the Boilermakers compiled an overall record of 8–4 with a mark of 6–2 in conference play, sharing the Big Ten title with Michigan and Northwestern. Purdue earned a berth in the Rose Bowl, where the Boilermakers lost to Washington. The team played home games at Ross–Ade Stadium in West Lafayette, Indiana .

Purdue's offense was led by quarterback and Heisman Trophy-finalist Drew Brees. Brees led the Big Ten in completions, attempts, passing yards and passing touchdowns, setting the Big Ten career record for career passing yards with 11,517 passing former Purdue player, Mark Herrmann who had set the mark with 9,946 in 1980. The team had neither a 1,000-yard rusher nor a 1,000-yard receiver. Vinny Sutherland was the leading receiver with 926 receiving yards, and Montrell Lowe led the team in rushing with 919 rushing yards. Brees and offensive tackle Matt Light were the only players on the offensive unit selected as an All-American by Pro Football Weekly.

On defense, the 2000 Purdue team had true freshman safety Stuart Schweigert, who intercepted five passes and also led the team in tackles with 85. Other standouts on defense included defensive end Akin Ayodele with 9.0 quarterback sacks, and linebacker Landon Johnson with 71 tackles and two sacks, and safety Ralph Turner with 65 tackles, four sacks and an interception.

Ten members of the team were honored as All-Big Ten Conference selections, Brees was named the Big Ten Offensive of the Year and the Chicago Tribune Silver Football, while Schweigert was named the Big Ten Freshman of the Year. Nineteen members of the 2000 Boilermakers football team went on to play in the National Football League (NFL). Prior to 2000, the Boilermakers had compiled three consecutive winning seasons and but had not won a Big Ten championship since the 1967 Purdue team did so.

The 2000 team, which had two Super Bowl winners, was featured in the 2013 Big Ten Network documentary series Big Ten Elite and is still regarded by Purdue fans as one of the greatest Boilermakers football teams of all time. The Boilermakers have yet to win the Big Ten championship or reach the Rose Bowl since then.

The season was Brees's final year with the Boilermakers. He left Purdue with Big Ten Conference records in passing yards (11,792), touchdown passes (90), total offensive yards (12,693), completions (1,026), and attempts (1,678). Brees won the Maxwell Award as the nation's outstanding player of 2000 and won the National Collegiate Athletic Association's Today's Top VIII Award as a member of the class of 2001. Brees was third in balloting for the Heisman Trophy in 2000. The Boilermakers won all eight of their games when they scored 30 points or more in 2000.

== Schedule ==
Date	Time	Opponent	Rank	Site	TV	Result	Attendance	Source
September 2	1:00 pm	Central Michigan*	No. 15	Ross–Ade Stadium; West Lafayette, IN		W 48–0	56,197	
September 9	1:00 pm	Kent State*	No. 14	Ross–Ade Stadium; West Lafayette, IN		W 45–10	62,181	
September 16	12:00 pm	at No. 21 Notre Dame*	No. 13	Notre Dame Stadium; Notre Dame, IN (rivalry)	NBC	L 21–23	80,232	
September 23	11:00 am	Minnesota	No. 21	Ross–Ade Stadium; West Lafayette, IN	ESPN	W 38–24	67,425	
September 30	2:30 pm	at Penn State	No. 22	Beaver Stadium; University Park, PA	ABC	L 20–22	96,023	
October 7	11:00 am	No. 6 Michigan		Ross–Ade Stadium; West Lafayette, IN	ABC	W 32–31	68,340	
October 14	11:00 am	at No. 17 Northwestern	No. 21	Ryan Field; Evanston, IL	ESPN	W 41–28	41,053	
October 21	11:00 am	at Wisconsin	No. 17	Camp Randall Stadium; Madison, WI	ESPN	W 30–24 ^{OT}	79,048	
October 28	2:30 pm	No. 12 Ohio State	No. 16	Ross–Ade Stadium; West Lafayette, IN	ABC	W 31–27	68,666	
November 11	1:00 pm	at Michigan State	No. 9	Spartan Stadium; East Lansing, MI	ABC	L 10–30	74,624	
November 18	3:30 pm	Indiana	No. 17	Ross–Ade Stadium; West Lafayette, IN (Old Oaken Bucket)	ABC	W 41–13	69,104	
January 1	5:00 pm	vs. No. 4 Washington	No. 14	Rose Bowl; Pasadena, CA (Rose Bowl)	ABC	L 24–34	94,392	
*Non-conference game; Rankings from AP Poll released prior to the game; All times are in Eastern time

== Rankings ==
Ranking movements Legend: ██ Increase in ranking ██ Decrease in ranking — = Not ranked
	Week																
Poll	Pre	1	2	3	4	5	6	7	8	9	10	11	12	13	14	15	Final
AP	14	15	14	13	21	22	—	21	17	16	11	9	17	14	14	14	13
Coaches	13	14	13	12	21	19	—	21	17	16	13	9	17	14	14	14	13
BCS	Not released									15	10	10	—	—	—	—	Not released

== Game summaries ==
=== Michigan ===
Team	1	2	3	4	Total
Michigan	7	21	0	3	31
• Purdue	3	7	13	9	32

- Date: October 7
- Location: Ross–Ade Stadium, West Lafayette, IN
- Game start: 11:10 a.m. CST
- Elapsed time: 3:30
- Game attendance: 68,340
- Game weather: Partly cloudy, 41 °F (5 °C), wind 12 mph (19 km/h) NW
- Referee: James Lapetina
- TV announcers (ABC): Brent Musburger (Play-by-play), Gary Danielson (Color) & Jack Arute (Sideline)
- References: Archived 2016-03-05 at the Wayback Machine

Scoring summary
1	9:17	MICH	Marquise Walker 7 yard pass from Drew Henson (Jeff Del Verne kick)	MICH 7–0
1	3:03	PUR	Travis Dorsch 24 yard field goal	MICH 7–3
2	11:02	MICH	B.J. Askew 4 yard pass from Drew Henson (Jeff Del Verne kick)	MICH 14–3
2	6:25	MICH	Anthony Thomas 61 yard run (Jeff Del Verne kick)	MICH 21–3
2	1:50	PUR	Vinny Sutherland 25 yard pass from Drew Brees (Travis Dorsch kick)	MICH 21–10
2	0:13	MICH	David Terrell 15 yard pass from Drew Henson (Jeff Del Verne kick)	MICH 28–10
3	11:03	PUR	Steve Ennis 1 yard run (pass failed)	MICH 28–16
3	4:12	PUR	Montrell Lowe 16 yard run (Travis Dorsch kick)	MICH 28–23
4	11:55	MICH	Jeff Del Verne 34 yard field goal	MICH 31–23
4	6:45	PUR	John Standeford 10 yard pass from Drew Brees (pass failed)	MICH 31–29
4	0:04	PUR	Travis Dorsch 33 yard field goal	PUR 32–31

=== At Northwestern ===
Team	1	2	3	4	Total
• Purdue	7	7	20	7	41
Northwestern	14	0	0	14	28

- Date: October 14
- Location: Ryan Field, Evanston, IL
- Game attendance: 41,053
- TV announcers (ESPN): Steve Levy (Play-by-play), Todd Christensen (Color) & Dave Ryan (Sideline)

Scoring summary
Q1	12:06	NW	Anderson 1 yard run (Long kick)	NW 7–0
Q1	10:26	PUR	Sutherland 10 yard pass from Brees (Dorsch kick)	Tie 7–7
Q1	7:27	NW	Johnson 7 yard pass from Kustok (Long kick)	NW 14–7
Q2	3:51	PUR	Standeford 7 yard pass from Brees (Dorsch kick)	Tie 14–14
Q3	11:20	PUR	Standeford 5 yard pass from Brees (Dorsch kick)	PUR 21–14
Q3	7:53	PUR	Sutherland 26 yard pass from Brees (Dorsch kick)	PUR 28–14
Q3	4:51	PUR	Ennis 1 yard run (kick failed)	PUR 34–14
Q4	6:45	NW	Johnson 41 yard pass from Kustok (Long kick)	PUR 34–21
Q4	4:48	PUR	Standeford 43 yard pass from Brees (Dorsch kick)	PUR 41–21
Q4	1:16	NW	Ayeni 35 yard pass from Danielson (Long kick)	PUR 41–28

- Montrell Lowe 26 Rush, 174 Yds

=== At Wisconsin ===
Team	1	2	3	4	OT	Total
• Purdue	0	7	14	3	6	30
Wisconsin	0	14	3	7	0	24

- Date: October 21
- Location: Camp Randall Stadium, Madison, WI
- Game start: 12:10 p.m. EST
- Elapsed time: 3:25
- Game attendance: 79,048
- Game weather: Sunny; 55 °F (13 °C); wind 9 mph (14 km/h) E
- Referee: Lipski
- TV announcers (ABC): Brent Musburger (Play-by-play), Gary Danielson (Color) & Jack Arute (Sideline)

Scoring summary
Q2	14:34	WIS	Chambers 28 yard pass from Sorgi (Pisetsky kick)	WIS 7–0
Q2	9:37	PUR	Simpson 30 yard pass from Brees (Dorsch kick)	Tie 7–7
Q2	8:29	WIS	Bennett 33 yard run (Pisetsky kick)	WIS 14–7
Q3	12:33	PUR	Brees 6 yard run (Dorsch kick)	Tie 14–14
Q3	6:37	WIS	Pisetsky 35 yard field goal	WIS 17–14
Q3	5:40	PUR	Morales 78 yard pass from Brees (Dorsch kick)	PUR 21–17
Q4	7:56	PUR	Dorsch 44 yard field goal	PUR 24–17
Q4	3:50	WIS	Sigmund 5 yard pass from Sorgi (Pisetsky kick)	Tie 24–24
OT		PUR	Woodyard 36 yard blocked field goal return	PUR 30–24

Drew Brees becomes the career passing yardage leader in Big Ten history.

=== Ohio State ===
Team	1	2	3	4	Total
Ohio State	0	3	17	7	27
• Purdue	0	7	3	21	31

- Date: October 28
- Location: Ross–Ade Stadium, West Lafayette, IN
- Game start: 2:34 p.m. EDT
- Elapsed time: 3:34
- Game attendance: 68,666
- Game weather: Fair / Mostly sunny, 57 °F (14 °C), wind 15 mph (24 km/h) E
- Referee: Steve Newman
- TV announcers (ABC): Brent Musburger (Play-by-play), Gary Danielson (Color) & Jack Arute (Sideline)

Scoring summary
2	9:02	OSU	Dan Stultz 35-yard field goal	OSU 3–0
2	3:41	PUR	Steve Ennis 2-yard run (Travis Dorsch kick)	PUR 7–3
3	12:40	PUR	Travis Dorsch 34-yard field goal	PUR 10–3
3	8:52	OSU	Dan Stultz 45-yard field goal	PUR 10–6
3	3:41	OSU	Jamar Martin 1-yard run (Stultz kick)	OSU 13–10
3	1:53	OSU	Nate Clements 83-yard punt return (Stultz kick)	OSU 20–10
4	12:46	PUR	John Standeford 5-yard pass from Drew Brees (Dorsch kick)	OSU 20–17
4	5:59	PUR	Vinny Sutherland 19-yard pass from Brees (Dorsch kick)	PUR 24–20
4	2:16	OSU	Westbrooks 2-yard run (Stultz kick)	OSU 27–24
4	1:55	PUR	Seth Morales 64-yard pass from Brees (Dorsch kick)	PUR 31–27

=== Vs. Washington (Rose Bowl) ===
Team	1	2	3	4	Total
Purdue	0	10	7	7	24
• Washington	14	0	6	14	34

- Date: January 1
- Location: Rose Bowl, Pasadena, CA
- Game attendance: 94,392
- Referee: Jack Childress
- TV announcers (ABC): Keith Jackson (Play-by-play), Tim Brant (Color) & Todd Harris (Sideline)

Scoring summary
1	8:33	WASH	Cleman 1-yard run (Anderson kick)	WASH 7–0
1	4:42	WASH	Tuiasosopo 5-yard run (Anderson kick)	WASH 14–0
2	11:32	PUR	Sutherland 5-yard pass from Brees (Dorsch kick)	WASH 14–7
2	0:26	PUR	Travis Dorsch 26-yard field goal	WASH 14–10
3	13:12	WASH	Anderson 47-yard field goal	WASH 17–10
3	11:58	PUR	Sutherland 24-yard pass from Brees (Dorsch kick)	Tied 17–17
3	6:55	WASH	Anderson 42-yard field goal	WASH 20–17
4	12:00	WASH	Elstrom 8-yard pass from Tuiasosopo (Anderson kick)	WASH 27–17
4	7:25	WASH	Hurst 8-yard run (Anderson kick)	WASH 34–17
4	6:37	PUR	Brown 42-yard run (Dorsch kick)	WASH 34–24

== Personnel ==
=== Roster ===
2000 Purdue Boilermakers football team roster
Players
Coaches
Offense 0

Pos.	#	Name	Class
WR	2	Gary Heaggans	Fr
RB	3	Montrell Lowe	So
QB	4	Brandon Hance	Fr
WR	5	Chris James	So
QB	10	David Edgerton	Sr
WR	14	Vinny Sutherland	Sr
QB	15	Drew Brees (C)	Sr
WR	18	Keith Dawson	Sr
QB	20	Carl Buergler	So
WR	21	Taylor Stubblefield	Fr
WR	25	Donald Winston	Sr
WR	26	Finus Tatum	Fr
RB	31	Brandon Robinson	Fr
RB	33	Rob Jackson	Fr
RB	36	Sedrick Brown	Jr
RB	44	Steve Ennis	So
RB	45	Jacob Rowe	So
C	52	Max Miller	So
C	54	Rob Turner	So
OT	55	Ian Allen	Sr
G	56	Chukky Okobi	Sr
OL	66	Jason Eisele	Fr
OL	67	Jason Sulk	Fr
G	68	Kelly Kitchel	So
G	70	Sean Rufolo	Jr
OT	71	Kelly Butler	Fr
OT	72	Josh Kirkpatrick	Sr
OL	73	Mike Holle	Fr
C	74	Nick Pilipaukis	Fr
OL	75	Tyler Moore	Fr
OL	76	Willie Bach	Fr
OT	77	Brandon Gorin	Sr
OT	78	Matt Light	Sr
G	79	Gene Mruczkowski	So
WR	80	A. T. Simpson	Jr
TE	81	Chris Randolph	Jr
WR	82	John Standeford	Fr
WR	83	Andre Henderson	Fr
WR	84	Seth Morales	So
WR	85	Bobby Montgomery	Fr
TE	89	Tim Stratton	Jr
TE	91	Matt Holbrook	Fr
TE	93	Pete Lougheed	So

Defense

Pos.	#	Name	Class
DE	2	Tim Olmstead	Fr
S	6	Deaunte Ferrell	Fr
CB	7	Ashante Woodyard	Jr
S	8	Ralph Turner	So
S	9	Stuart Schweigert	Fr
CB	12	Antwaun Rogers	Fr
LB	13	Akin Ayodele (C)	Jr
LB	16	Gilbert Gardner	Fr
S	17	Ben Smith	Jr
CB	18	Korey Mack	Fr
CB	19	R'Kes Starling	Jr
CB	20	Chuck McQuaid	Fr
CB	22	Sean Morris	Fr
CB	23	Chris Clopton	Sr
S	24	Jon Getz	So
DB	27	Charles Edwards	Fr
CB	28	Jacques Reeves	Fr
LB	32	Cornell Middlebrook	So
LB	34	Niko Koutouvides	Fr
CB	35	Marcus Hill	Fr
CB	37	Bryan Jacquay	Sr
S	38	Brady Doe	Jr
LB	39	Jon Goldsberry	Fr
LB	40	Kevin Nesfield	Fr
LB	41	Alex Tone	Jr
DT	42	Brent Botts	Sr
DT	43	Daniel Giles	Fr
LB	45	Chancellor Barjona	Jr
S	46	Tom Vaughan	Sr
LB	47	Landon Johnson	Fr
S	48	Tim Upshur	Jr
CB	49	Eric Hasegawa	Fr
LB	50	Brian Dinkins	Sr
LB	51	Joe Odom	So
DE	53	Shaun Phillips	Fr
LB	57	Patrick Schaub	Fr
DE	58	Warren Moore	Sr
DE	59	Doug Swann	Fr
DT	61	Alex Underwood	Fr
DE	62	Vedran Dzolovic	Fr
DE	63	Dave Owen	Fr
DT	65	Brandon Johnson	Jr
LB	86	Josh Tobey	So
DE	87	Rocco Foggio	Sr
LB	88	Jason Loerzel	Jr
LB	90	Greg Counts	Fr
DT	92	Craig Terrill	Fr
DT	94	Luke Burroughs	Fr
DT	95	Jody Goatley	Sr
DT	96	Mike Lawrence	Fr
DT	98	Matt Mitrione	Jr
DT	99	Daemeon Grier	Fr

Special teams

Pos.	#	Name	Class
K	6	Quinton Owens	Fr
P	11	Scott Kurz	Jr
P	29	Aaron Lavin	Fr
K	30	Travis Dorsch	Jr
LS	64	Mark Reid	Fr
LS	69	John Shelbourne	So

Head coach

- Joe Tiller

Coordinators/assistant coaches

- Jim Chaney (offensive coordinator)
- Brock Spack (defensive coordinator)
- Scott Downing (assistant head coach/running backs/special teams)
- Gary Emanuel (defensive ends)
- Ken Greene (defensive backs)
- Mark Hagen (defensive tackles)
- Danny Hope (offensive line)
- Greg Olson (quarterbacks)
- Kevin Sumlin (wide receivers)
- Joel Thomas (graduate assistant)
- Darrell Perkins (graduate assistant)

Legend

- (C) Team captain
- (S) Suspended
- (I) Ineligible
- Injured
- Redshirt

Roster
Last update: October 22, 2013

=== Depth chart ===
Defense

FS
Stuart Schweigert
Brady Doe

WLB	MLB	SLB
Landon Johnson	Joe Odom	Gilbert Gardner
Alex Tone	Jason Loerzel	Patrick Schaub

SS
Ralph Turner
Tom Vaughan

CB
Chris Clopton
Jacques Reeves

DE	DT	DT	DE
Akin Ayodele	Craig Terrill	Matt Mitrione	Shaun Phillips
Brian Dinkins	Daemeon Grier	Brent Botts	Warren Moore

CB
Ashante Woodyard
R'Kes Starling

Offense

WR
Vinny Sutherland
Donald Winston

WR
John Standeford
Andre Henderson

LT	LG	C	RG	RT
Matt Light	Gene Mruczkowski	Chukky Okobi	Rob Turner	Brandon Gorin
Ian Allen	Kelly Kitchel	Nick Pilipaukis	Sean Rufolo	Kelly Butler

TE
Tim Stratton
Chris Randolph

WR
Seth Morales
A. T. Simpson

QB
Drew Brees
Brandon Hance

Special teams
PK Travis Dorsch
P Scott Kurz
P Travis Dorsch
KR Vinny Sutherland
PR Vinny Sutherland
LS Tim Stratton
H Ben Smith

RB
Montrell Lowe
Sedrick Brown

== Awards and honors ==
- Drew Brees, Maxwell Award
- Drew Brees, Chicago Tribune Silver Football
- Tim Stratton, John Mackey Award

== Seniors drafted by the NFL ==
Player	Position	Round	Pick	NFL Club
Drew Brees	Quarterback	2	32	San Diego Chargers
Matt Light	Tackle	2	48	New England Patriots
Vinny Sutherland	Wide Receiver	5	136	Atlanta Falcons
Chukky Okobi	Center	5	146	Pittsburgh Steelers
Brandon Gorin	Tackle	7	201	San Diego Chargers
