= 2001 Purdue Boilermakers football team =

American college football season

2001 Purdue Boilermakers football

Sun Bowl, L 27–33 vs. Washington State
- Conference: Big Ten Conference
- Record: 6–6 (4–4 Big Ten)
- Head coach: Joe Tiller (5th season)
- Offensive coordinator: Jim Chaney (5th season)
- Offensive scheme: Spread
- Defensive coordinator: Brock Spack (5th season)
- Base defense: 4–3
- Home stadium: Ross–Ade Stadium

2001 Big Ten Conference football standings
	Conf.			Overall
Team	W		L	W		L
No. 12 Illinois $	7	–	1	10	–	2
No. 20 Michigan	6	–	2	8	–	4
Ohio State	5	–	3	7	–	5
Iowa	4	–	4	7	–	5
Purdue	4	–	4	6	–	6
Penn State	4	–	4	5	–	6
Indiana	4	–	4	5	–	6
Michigan State	3	–	5	7	–	5
Wisconsin	3	–	5	5	–	7
Minnesota	2	–	6	4	–	7
Northwestern	2	–	6	4	–	7
$ – BCS representative as conference champion; Rankings from AP Poll

The 2001 Purdue Boilermakers football team represented Purdue University during the 2001 NCAA Division I-A football season.

== Schedule ==
Date	Time	Opponent	Rank	Site	TV	Result	Attendance
September 2	1:30 pm	at Cincinnati*		Nippert Stadium; Cincinnati, OH	ESPN2	W 19–14	35,097
September 22	11:00 am	Akron*		Ross–Ade Stadium; West Lafayette, IN		W 33–14	63,459
September 29	11:00 am	at Minnesota	No. 24	Hubert H. Humphrey Metrodome; Minneapolis, MN	ESPN2	W 35–28 ^{OT}	40,160
October 6	11:00 am	Iowa	No. 21	Ross–Ade Stadium; West Lafayette, IN	ESPN	W 23–14	58,888
October 13	11:00 am	at No. 12 Michigan	No. 17	Michigan Stadium; Ann Arbor, MI	ESPN	L 10–24	110,450
October 27	12:00 pm	Northwestern^{†}	No. 24	Ross–Ade Stadium; West Lafayette, IN	ESPN2	W 32–27	67,181
November 3	12:00 pm	No. 21 Illinois	No. 20	Ross–Ade Stadium; West Lafayette, IN (Purdue Cannon)	ESPN	L 13–38	61,568
November 10	12:00 pm	at Ohio State		Ohio Stadium; Columbus, OH	ESPN	L 9–35	104,189
November 17	12:00 pm	Michigan State		Ross–Ade Stadium; West Lafayette, IN	ESPN2	W 24–14	55,660
November 24	12:00 pm	at Indiana		Memorial Stadium; Bloomington, IN (Old Oaken Bucket)	ESPN+	L 7–13	36,685
December 1	12:00 pm	Notre Dame*		Ross–Ade Stadium; West Lafayette, IN (Shillelagh Trophy)	ABC	L 18–24	68,750
December 31	2:15 pm	No. 13 Washington State*		Sun Bowl Stadium; El Paso, TX (Sun Bowl)	CBS	L 27–33	47,812
*Non-conference game; ^{†}Homecoming; Rankings from AP Poll released prior to the game; All times are in Eastern time

== Game summaries ==
=== Iowa ===
Team	1	2	3	4	Total
Iowa	7	0	7	0	14
• Purdue	7	6	0	10	23

- Date: October 6
- Location: Ross–Ade Stadium, West Lafayette, Indiana
- Game attendance: 58,888

Scoring summary
1	9:36	PUR	Ashante Woodyard 86 yard interception return (Travis Dorsch kick)	Purdue 7–0
1	4:41	IOWA	Jeremy Allen 8 yard pass from Kyle McCann (Nate Kaeding kick)	Tie 7–7
2	8:38	PUR	Travis Dorsch 39 yard field goal	Purdue 10–7
2	13:13	PUR	Travis Dorsch 42 yard field goal	Purdue 13–7
3	6:38	IOWA	Kahlil Hill 6 yard pass from Kyle McCann (Nate Kaeding kick)	Iowa 14–13
4	12:07	PUR	Brandon Hance 4 yard run (Travis Dorsch kick)	Purdue 20–14
4	1:38	PUR	Travis Dorsch 37 yard field goal	Purdue 23–14

== Roster ==
2001 Purdue Boilermakers football team roster
Players
Coaches
Offense

Pos.	#	Name	Class
WR	2	Gary Heaggans	Sr
RB	3	Montrell Lowe	Jr
QB	4	Brandon Hance	Fr
WR	5	Chris James	Jr
QB	10	Carl Buergler	Sr
QB	18	Kyle Orton	Fr
WR	21	Taylor Stubblefield	Fr
WR	23	Kevin Noel	Fr
RB	25	Joey Harris	So
RB	27	Brandon Jones	Fr
WR	31	Jimmy Guidos	So
RB	32	Jerod Void	Fr
RB	36	Sedrick Brown	Sr
FB	42	Patrick Schaub	So
RB	45	Jacob Rowe	Jr
G	54	Rob Turner	Jr
G	68	Kelly Kitchel	Jr
G	70	Sean Rufolo	Sr
G	71	Kelly Butler	So
G	76	Willie Bach	So
OT	77	Pete Lougheed	Jr
C	79	Gene Mruczkowski	Jr
WR	80	A. T. Simpson	Sr
TE	81	Chris Randolph	Sr
WR	82	John Standeford	So
TE	83	Mike Rhinehart	Fr
WR	84	Seth Morales	Jr
WR	85	Jameson Evans	Fr
TE	89	Tim Stratton	Sr

Defense

Pos.	#	Name	Class
S	6	Deaunte Ferrell	So
S	7	Ashante Woodyard	Sr
S	8	Ralph Turner	Jr
S	9	Stuart Schweigert	So
CB	12	Antwaun Rogers	Fr
DE	13	Akin Ayodele (C)	Sr
CB	14	Chad Dickerson	So
LB	16	Gilbert Gardner
S	17	Ben Smith	Sr
S	19	R'Kes Starling	Sr
S	20	Chuck McQuaid	Sr
DE	22	Shaun Phillips	So
S	24	Jon Getz	Sr
CB	28	Jacques Reeves	So
LB	34	Niko Koutouvides	So
S	38	Brady Doe	Sr
LB	39	Bobby Iwuchukwu	Fr
DE	40	Kevin Nesfield	So
LB	41	Alex Tone	Sr
LB	44	Jon Goldsberry	Fr
LB	47	Landon Johnson	So
S	48	Tim Upshur	Sr
LB	51	Joe Odom	Jr
DT	55	Brandon Villarreal	Fr
DE	57	Brent Hawkins	Fr
DT	58	Brent Grover	Fr
DE	59	Doug Swann	Jr
DE	62	Vedran Dzolovic	So
DT	75	Emmitt Tyler II	Fr
LB	88	Jason Loerzel	Sr
DT	92	Craig Terrill	So
DT	98	Matt Mitrione	Sr
DT	99	Daemeon Grier	Jr

Special teams

Pos.	#	Name	Class
P	11	Scott Kurz	Sr
P	29	Aaron Lavin	Fr
K	30	Travis Dorsch	Sr
LS	69	John Shelbourne	Jr

Head coach

- Joe Tiller

Coordinators/assistant coaches

- Jim Chaney (offensive coordinator/tight ends)
- Brock Spack (defensive coordinator/linebackers)
- Blaine Bennett (quarterbacks)
- Ted Gilmore (wide receivers)
- Scott Downing (assistant head coach/running backs/special teams)
- Gary Emanuel (defensive ends)
- Ken Greene (defensive backs)
- Mark Hagen (defensive tackles)
- Danny Hope (offensive line)

Legend

- (C) Team captain
- (S) Suspended
- (I) Ineligible
- Injured
- Redshirt

Roster
Last update: October 22, 2013

== Awards and honors ==
- Travis Dorsch, Ray Guy Award

== Seniors drafted by the NFL ==
Player	Position	Round	Pick	NFL club
Akin Ayodele	Linebacker	3	89	Jacksonville Jaguars
Travis Dorsch	Punter	4	109	Cincinnati Bengals
