= 1998 Purdue Boilermakers football team =

American college football season

1998 Purdue Boilermakers football

Alamo Bowl champion

Alamo Bowl, W 37–34 vs. Kansas State
- Conference: Big Ten Conference

Ranking
- Coaches: No. 23
- AP: No. 24
- Record: 9–4 (6–2 Big Ten)
- Head coach: Joe Tiller (2nd season)
- Offensive coordinator: Jim Chaney (2nd season)
- Offensive scheme: Spread
- Defensive coordinator: Brock Spack (2nd season)
- Base defense: 4–3
- Captains: Rosevelt Colvin; Isaac Jones
- Home stadium: Ross–Ade Stadium

1998 Big Ten Conference football standings
	Conf.			Overall
Team	W		L	W		L
No. 2 Ohio State %+	7	–	1	11	–	1
No. 6 Wisconsin $+	7	–	1	11	–	1
No. 12 Michigan +	7	–	1	10	–	3
No. 24 Purdue	6	–	2	9	–	4
No. 17 Penn State	5	–	3	9	–	3
Michigan State	4	–	4	6	–	6
Minnesota	2	–	6	5	–	6
Indiana	2	–	6	4	–	7
Illinois	2	–	6	3	–	8
Iowa	2	–	6	3	–	8
Northwestern	0	–	8	3	–	9
$ – BCS representative as conference champion; % – BCS at-large representative; + – Conference co-champions; Rankings from AP Poll

The 1998 Purdue Boilermakers football team represented Purdue University during the 1998 NCAA Division I-A football season. They played their home games at Ross–Ade Stadium in West Lafayette, Indiana and were members of the Big Ten Conference.

== Schedule ==
Date	Time	Opponent	Site	TV	Result	Attendance
August 30	2:30 pm	at USC*	Los Angeles Memorial Coliseum; Los Angeles, CA (Pigskin Classic)	ABC	L 17–27	56,623
September 12	11:00 am	Rice*	Ross–Ade Stadium; West Lafayette, IN	ESPN	W 21–19	42,563
September 19	11:00 am	Central Florida*	Ross–Ade Stadium; West Lafayette, IN	ESPN	W 35–7	53,469
September 26	1:30 pm	at No. 23 Notre Dame*	Notre Dame Stadium; Notre Dame, IN (Shillelagh Trophy)	NBC	L 30–31	80,012
October 3	1:30 pm	Minnesota	Ross–Ade Stadium; West Lafayette, IN		W 56–21	56,809
October 10	7:30 pm	at No. 10 Wisconsin	Camp Randall Stadium; Madison, WI	ESPN2	L 24–31	78,782
October 17	2:30 pm	at No. 12 Penn State	Beaver Stadium; University Park, PA	ABC	L 13–31	97,034
October 24	1:00 pm	Illinois^{†}	Ross–Ade Stadium; West Lafayette, IN (Purdue Cannon)		W 42–9	60,163
October 31	1:00 pm	Iowa	Ross–Ade Stadium; West Lafayette, IN		W 36–14	50,443
November 7	12:00 pm	at Northwestern	Ryan Field; Evanston, IL	ESPN2	W 56–21	39,575
November 14	12:00 pm	at Michigan State	Spartan Stadium; East Lansing, MI	ESPN+	W 25–24	69,091
November 21	1:00 pm	Indiana	Ross–Ade Stadium; West Lafayette, IN (Old Oaken Bucket)		W 52–7	68,512
December 29	8:00 pm	vs. No. 4 Kansas State*	Alamodome; San Antonio, TX (Alamo Bowl)	ESPN	W 37–34	60,780
*Non-conference game; ^{†}Homecoming; Rankings from AP Poll released prior to the game; All times are in Eastern time

== Rankings ==
Ranking movements Legend: ██ Increase in ranking ██ Decrease in ranking — = Not ranked RV = Received votes
	Week															
Poll	Pre	1	2	3	4	5	6	7	8	9	10	11	12	13	14	Final
AP	RV	—	—	RV	—	RV	—	—	—	—	—	RV	RV	RV	RV	24
Coaches	RV	RV	—	RV	—	RV	—	—	—	—	—	RV	RV	RV	RV	23
BCS	Not released								—	—	—	—	—	—	—	Not released

== Game summaries ==
=== Iowa ===
Team	1	2	3	4	Total
Hawkeyes	0	0	0	14	14
• Boilermakers	7	12	10	7	36

- Date: October 31
- Location: Ross–Ade Stadium, West Lafayette, IN

=== Indiana ===
Team	1	2	3	4	Total
Hoosiers	7	0	0	0	7
• Boilermakers	7	21	3	21	52

- Date: November 21
- Location: Ross–Ade Stadium, West Lafayette, IN
- Game start: 1:00 p.m. EST
- Game attendance: 68,512

Scoring summary
Q1	8:06	IND	Randle El 4 yard run (Payne kick)	IND 7–0
Q1	2:12	PUR	Stratton 4 yard pass from Brees (Dorsch kick)	Tie 7–7
Q2	11:26	PUR	Cox 12 yard pass from Brees (Dorsch kick)	PUR 14–7
Q2	8:11	PUR	Stratton 11 yard pass from Brees (Dorsch kick)	PUR 21–7
Q2	5:18	PUR	Jones 37 yard pass from Brees (Dorsch kick)	PUR 28–7
Q3	9:10	PUR	Dorsch 37 yard field goal	PUR 31–7
Q4	7:31	PUR	Sutherland 8 yard pass from Edgerton (Dorsch kick)	PUR 38–7
Q4	4:59	PUR	Sutherland 8 yard pass from Edgerton (Dorsch kick)	PUR 45–7
Q4	:58	PUR	Sutherland 24 yard pass from Edgerton (Dorsch kick)	PUR 52–7

=== Kansas State (Alamo Bowl) ===
#4 Kansas State vs. #24 Purdue

Team	1	2	3	4	Total
Wildcats	0	7	6	21	34
• Boilermakers	0	17	10	10	37

- Date: December 29
- Location: Alamodome, San Antonio, Texas
- Game attendance: 60,780

Scoring summary
Q2	14:47	Purdue	Daniels 5-yard pass from Brees (Dorsch kick)	Purdue 7–0
Q2	13:03	Purdue	Dorsch 25-yard field goal	Purdue 10–0
Q2	9:49	KSU	McDonald 1-yard pass from Bishop (Gramatica kick)	Purdue 10–7
Q2	8:36	Purdue	Jones 30-yard pass from Brees (Dorsch kick)	Purdue 17–7
Q3	8:06	KSU	Havick recovered fumble in end zone (kick failed)	Purdue 17–13
Q3	0:52	Purdue	Nugent recovered fumble in end zone (Dorsch kick)	Purdue 24–13
Q3	0:04	Purdue	Dorsch 26-yard field goal	Purdue 27–13
Q4	11:59	KSU	Allen 3-yard run (Gramatica kick)	Purdue 27–20
Q4	6:44	Purdue	Dorsch 37-yard field goal	Purdue 30–20
Q4	6:23	KSU	McDonald 88-yard pass from Bishop (Gramatica kick)	Purdue 30–27
Q4	1:24	KSU	Swift 2-yard pass from Bishop (Gramatica kick)	KSU 34–30
Q4	0:30	Purdue	Jones 24-yard pass from Brees (Dorsch kick)	Purdue 37–34

== Roster ==
1998 Purdue Boilermakers football team roster
Players
Coaches
Offense

Pos.	#	Name	Class
QB	15	Drew Brees	So
RB		J Crabtree
RB		Chris Clopton
OL		David Cohen
WR		Gabe Cox
WR		Chris Daniels
QB		David Edgerton
OT	77	Brandon Gorin	So
RB		Tarah Graham
RB		Eric Haddad
WR		Fahim Chesti
RB		Dondre Johnson
WR	6	Isaac Jones	Sr
WR	84	Randall Lane	Jr
OT	78	Matt Light	So
OL		Jim Niedrach
OL	56	Chukky Okobi	So
TE		Chris Randolph
WR		A. T. Simpson
WR	89	Tim Stratton	Fr
WR	14	Vinny Sutherland	So
WR		Robert Tolbert

Defense

Pos.	#	Name	Class
DB		DaShann Austin
DB		Adrian Beasley
DB		Henry Bell
LB		Willie Burroughs
DE	59	Rosevelt Colvin	Sr
DB		Lamar Conard
DL		Brian Dinkins
LB		Willie Fells
DB		Billy Gustin
CB	11	Michael Hawthorne	Jr
LB		Jason Loerzel
DL		Matt Mitrione
DL	82	David Nugent	Jr
DL	49	Chukie Nwokorie	Sr
DE	54	Chike Okeafor	Sr
LB		John Reeves	Sr
LB		Mike Rose
DB		Ben Smith
DB		Todd Stelma

Special teams

Pos.	#	Name	Class
K	30	Travis Dorsch	Fr
P		Danny Rogers

Head coach

- Joe Tiller

Coordinators/assistant coaches

- Tim Burke (defensive backs)
- Jim Chaney (offensive coordinator)
- Brock Spack (defensive coordinator)
- Scott Downing
- Danny Hope (offensive line)
- Randy Melvin (defensive ends)
- Greg Olson (quarterbacks)
- Kevin Sumlin (wide receivers)
- Willie Tillman (graduate assistant)

Legend

- (C) Team captain
- (S) Suspended
- (I) Ineligible
- Injured
- Redshirt
