= Vinny Sutherland =

American football player (born 1978)

No. 14, 85, 87, 25
- Position: Wide receiver

Personal information
- Born: April 22, 1978 (age 48); West Palm Beach, Florida, U.S.
- Listed height: 5 ft 9 in (1.75 m)
- Listed weight: 195 lb (88 kg)

Career information
- High school: West Palm Beach (FL) Lakes Community
- College: Purdue
- NFL draft: 2001: 5th round, 136th overall pick

Career history
- Atlanta Falcons (2001)*; San Francisco 49ers (2001); Chicago Bears (2002); San Francisco 49ers (2002); New York Dragons (2004); Winnipeg Blue Bombers (2005)
- * Offseason or practice squad member only

Awards and highlights
- First-team All-Big Ten (2000)

Career NFL statistics
- Receptions: 1
- Receiving yards: 5
- Return yards: 1,336
- Stats at Pro Football Reference

Career AFL statistics
- Receptions: 7
- Receiving yards: 82
- Receiving touchdowns: 2
- Stats at ArenaFan.com

Vincent Joseph Sutherland (born April 22, 1978) is an American former professional football player who played wide receiver for two seasons in the National Football League (NFL) for the Atlanta Falcons, San Francisco 49ers and Chicago Bears. He was a standout receiver and kick returner for Purdue University from 1997-2000. He also played for the Arena Football League (AFL)'s New York Dragons. At the time of his graduation in 2001, his 13 receiving touchdowns were a school record for one season. That record was tied in 2002 by John Standeford, and broken in 2004 by Taylor Stubblefield. He also still holds school records for punt return average in a season, punt returns for touchdowns in a season/career, and the longest reception in Purdue history.

== Early life ==
Sutherland attended Palm Beach Lakes High School in West Palm Beach, Florida. There he participated in both football and track and field. As a senior, he averaged better than 34 yards per touch of the ball and finished with 500 yards rushing on 53 carries and 600 yards on 29 receptions. He also played as a defensive back. He scored a total of 14 touchdowns as the Rams finished 9-3, winning a district championship and advanced to quarterfinals of state playoffs. After the season, he was named to the Class 6A second-team all-state, first-team all-area and made Florida's Super 11 Team. For Track & Field, Sutherland was all-state and all-county in both junior and senior years. He ran a high school career best 10.4 100m dash in senior season.

== College career ==
=== 1997 season ===
Sutherland choose to play his continue both his football and track and field career by signing a letter of intent to play for new Purdue Boilermakers head coach, Joe Tiller. He played in all 12 games and started three times as a true freshman. He finished the season ranked third on team with 34 receptions for 357 yards with two touchdowns. His two best games came against Notre Dame and Ball State when he made eight catches. The Notre Dame game also was his best yardage game of the season, as he had career-high 100 receiving yards. Joe Tillers' passing attack, often called "basketball on grass," specialized in bubble screen pass. Which played well for a smaller receiver like Sutherland. He registered 13 rushing attempts (usually bubble screen that resulted in an official lateral) for 111 yards (fourth on team) with two touchdowns. He also served as the team's punt returner, finishing the season ranked sixth in Big Ten with 9.8-yard punt return average. He also had one kickoff return for 19 yards. He attempted two passes on reverse plays, completing one for 20 yards. He was named a 2nd Team Freshman All-American by The Sporting News.

=== 1998 season ===
Sutherland received Purdue's Most Improved Offensive Player Award for 1999 spring practice. As a sophomore, he played in all 13 games, starting one. He had 31 receptions for 301 yards with three touchdowns as well as nine rushes for 58 yards. He once again served as the team's punter returner, returning 10 punts for 82 yards. He best game of the season came against Indiana, when he caught a career-high two touchdown passes and downed two punts inside Indiana's 5-yard line. His efforts for the week earned him Big Ten Special Teams Player of the Week honors, as well as Purdue's Pop Doan Award for special teams.

=== 1999 season ===
External videos
- Video of Sutherland's 99 yard touchdown reception

As a junior, Sutherland started all 12 games, and ranked second on team with 698 receiving yards and fourth with 39 receptions, to Chris Daniels, who set a school record in both categories. He also tied for team lead with seven touchdown receptions (also Chris Daniels). He ranked seventh in Big Ten with 58.2 receiving yards per game, and led Big Ten with school-record average of 16.4 yards per punt return, which still stands as the Purdue record for punt return yardage average for one season. His two punt returns for touchdowns were also a Purdue record. His 17.4 yards per punt return during regular season to rank third nationally, and had school-record two punt returns for touchdowns. He also caught a 99-yard TD pass from quarterback Drew Brees in a game against Northwestern, which is still the longest pass in NCAA history. After the season, he was named an honorable mention All-Big Ten by media.

=== 2000 season ===
As a senior, Sutherland started 11 games, missing one game with an injury. He was still able to lead Purdue in receptions (72), receiving yards (1,014), touchdowns (14), all-purpose yards (1,760) and scoring (84). His regular season numbers were enough to make him a semifinalist for the Biletnikoff Award, the nations top receiver. His play also assisted the Boilermakers to win the Big Ten conference during the regular season, which allowed them to be invited to the 2001 Rose Bowl against the Washington Huskies. Purdue would go on to lose the game 34-24, but Sutherland had two touchdown receptions in the game, tying a Rose Bowl record. He went on to be named first-team all-Big Ten as a wide receiver and second-team all Big Ten as a returner. At the time of his graduation, his 13 receiving touchdowns were a school record for one season. That record was tied in 2002 by John Standeford, and broken in 2004 by Taylor Stubblefield. He also holds school records for punt return average in a season, punt returns for touchdowns in a season/career, and the longest reception in Purdue history.

=== Statistics ===
		Receiving							Rushing			Passing					Kickoff returns					Punt returns				
Season	Team	GS	GP	Rec	Yds	Avg	TD	Long	Att	Yds	TD	Att	Comp	Yds	TD	INT	Att	Yds	Avg	TD	Long	Att	Yds	Avg	TD	Long
1997	Purdue	3	12	34	357	10.5	2	38	13	111	2	2	1	20	0	0	1	19	19	0	19	15	147	9.8	0	23
1998	Purdue	1	13	31	301	9.7	3	30	9	58	0	0	0	0	0	0	0	0	--	0	0	10	82	8.2	0	21
1999	Purdue	12	12	39	698	17.9	7	**99**	18	163	0	1	1	12	1	0	1	13	13.0	0	13	18	296	**16.4**	**2**	66
2000	Purdue	11	11	72	1,014	14.1	13	68	10	52	1	2	1	5	1	0	22	535	24.3	0	51	16	159	9.9	0	39
	Totals	27	48	176	2,370	13.5	25	**99**	50	384	3	5	3	37	2	0	24	567	23.6	0	51	59	684	11.6	**2**	66

- Numbers in **Bold** are Purdue school records

== Professional career ==
=== Pre-draft ===
Prior to the 2001 NFL draft, Sutherland was projected to be drafted in the fourth or fifth round by NFLDraftScout.com. He was rated as the eighteenth-best wide receiver in the draft. He was invited to the 2001 NFL Scouting Combine in Indianapolis, Indiana, where he posted the following numbers during his workouts:

Pre-draft measurables
Height	Weight	40-yard dash	10-yard split	20-yard split	Vertical jump
5 ft 8.5 in (1.74 m)	192 lb (87 kg)	4.48 s	1.58 s	2.59 s	32.5 in (0.83 m)
All values from 2001 NFL Scouting Combine

=== Atlanta Falcons ===
Sutherland was drafted by the Atlanta Falcons in the 5th round (136th overall). He was expected to replace Tim Dwight, who had been the team's kickoff and punt returner, but failed to make the team out of the preseason and was cut in August.

=== San Francisco 49ers ===
Sutherland was quickly signed in September 2001 by the San Francisco 49ers. The 49ers were also looking for return help, and used Sutherland as the primary return man for both kickoffs and punts. For the season, he returned 50 kickoffs for 1,140 yards (a 49ers rookie record) and 21 punts for 147 yards with no touchdowns. He saw limited action playing as a wide receiver as he only had one catch for 5 yards, and added one carry for 16 yards. Sutherland came back to camp the following fall, but was released on August 27 after suffering a hamstring injury.

=== Chicago Bears ===
After he was let go by the 49ers, Sutherland quickly caught on with the Chicago Bears Sutherland didn't play until his 4th week with the team, when he returned 3 kickoffs in a game against the Detroit Lions, for an average of 16.3 yards a return. He was released 4 days later.

=== Return to San Francisco 49ers ===
The 49ers re-signed Sutherland on December 31, 2002, but he did not appear in any games.

=== New York Dragons ===
In 2004, Sutherland signed with the New York Dragons of the Arena Football League. Sutherland appeared in the team's first 3 games, grabbing 7 passes for 82 yards and 2 touchdowns. He also had 2 carries for 2 yards. His arena football days were short lived, as he was released on February 23.
