= 2004 Sun Bowl =

American college football game

2004 Vitalis Sun Bowl
Arizona State Sun Devils	Purdue Boilermakers
(8–3)	(7–4)
Pac-10	Big Ten
27	23
Head coach: Dirk Koetter	Head coach: Joe Tiller
AP / Coaches / BCS; 21 / 24 / 19
	1	2	3	4	Total
Arizona State	3	0	7	17	27
Purdue	0	2	7	14	23
- Date: December 31, 2004
- Season: 2004
- Stadium: Sun Bowl
- Location: El Paso, Texas
- Referee: Gerard McGinn (Big East)
- Attendance: 51,288
- Payout: US$1.5 million per team

United States TV coverage
- Network: CBS
- Announcers: Verne Lundquist (play-by-play); Todd Blackledge (analyst); Tracy Wolfson (sidelines)

The 2004 Sun Bowl featured the Arizona State Sun Devils, and the Purdue Boilermakers. Sponsored by the Vitalis brand of hair tonic made by Bristol-Myers, the game was officially known as the Vitalis Sun Bowl. It was the 71st Sun Bowl.

Arizona State's place kicker, Jessie Ainsworth kicked a 22-yard field goal in the first quarter to give the Sun Devils a 3-0 lead. Arizona State's running back, Preston Jones was tackled in the end zone by Purdue's Brandon Villareal, for a safety, putting Purdue on the board 3-2. The defenses held, and that score held up in the locker room.

In the third quarter, Purdue's Kyle Orton connected with wide receiver Brian Hare for a long 80-yard touchdown pass to give Purdue a 9-3 lead. Arizona State quarterback, Sam Keller found Derek Hagan in the end zone for a 27-yard touchdown to put Arizona State back on top 10-9. He finished the game with 370 yards passing.

Early in the fourth quarter, Orton found all-American Taylor Stubblefield for a 5-yard touchdown pass, reclaiming the lead for Purdue, 16-10. Arizona State moved the ball on their ensuing drive, but it stalled, and they had to settle for a field goal. Ainsworth connected on a 34-yard field goal, trimming the margin to 16-13. Keller later threw to Rudy Burgess for a 41-yard touchdown, giving ASU a 20-16 lead.

Purdue reclaimed the lead with a 6-yard touchdown pass from Orton to Charles Davis giving them a 23-20 lead. Sam Keller's final touchdown to Rudy Burgess proved to be the game winner, as ASU held off Purdue by a 27-23 margin.

Grammy-winning Texas band Los Lonely Boys performed at halftime.
