= John Mackey Award =

Award presented annually to college football's most outstanding tight end

- Awarded for: College football's most outstanding tight end
- Country: United States

History
- First award: 2000
- Most recent: Eli Stowers, Vanderbilt
- Website: http://www.johnmackeyaward.com

The John Mackey Award is presented annually to college football's most outstanding tight end. Established in 2000 by the Nassau County Sports Commission, the award is given annually to the tight end who best exemplifies the play, sportsmanship, academics, and community values of Pro Football Hall of Fame tight end John Mackey.

The winner is chosen by a selection committee comprising sportswriters and former players, including Lee Corso, Phil Steele, Charles Arbuckle, and former John Mackey Award winners Tim Stratton, Dallas Clark, and D. J. Williams, among others. The award is a member of the National College Football Awards Association, which encompasses college football's most prestigious awards. Former Florida State tight end Nick O'Leary called the award one which "all tight ends dream of winning".

== Winners ==
Year	Winner	School	Ref
2000	Tim Stratton	Purdue	
2001	Daniel Graham	Colorado	
2002	Dallas Clark	Iowa	
2003	Kellen Winslow II	Miami (FL)	
2004	Heath Miller	Virginia	
2005	Marcedes Lewis	UCLA	
2006	Matt Spaeth	Minnesota	
2007	Fred Davis	USC	
2008	Chase Coffman	Missouri	
2009	Aaron Hernandez	Florida	
2010	D. J. Williams	Arkansas	
2011	Dwayne Allen	Clemson	
2012	Tyler Eifert	Notre Dame	
2013	Austin Seferian-Jenkins	Washington	
2014	Nick O'Leary	Florida State	
2015	Hunter Henry	Arkansas (2)	
2016	Jake Butt	Michigan	
2017	Mark Andrews	Oklahoma	
2018	T. J. Hockenson	Iowa (2)	
2019	Harrison Bryant	Florida Atlantic	
2020	Kyle Pitts	Florida (2)	
2021	Trey McBride	Colorado State	
2022	Brock Bowers	Georgia	
2023	Brock Bowers (2)	Georgia (2)	
2024	Tyler Warren	Penn State	
2025	Eli Stowers	Vanderbilt	
