= Taylor Stubblefield =

American football player and coach (born 1982)

Air Force Falcons
- Title: Wide receivers coach

Personal information
- Born: January 21, 1982 (age 44); Yakima, Washington, U.S.

Career information
- College: Purdue (2001–2004)
- NFL draft: 2005: undrafted

Career history

Playing
- Carolina Panthers* (2005); Hamilton Tiger-Cats* (2005); St. Louis Rams* (2006); Hamilton Tiger-Cats (2006)
- * Offseason or practice squad member only

Coaching
- Central Washington (2007) Wide receivers coach; Eastern Michigan (2008) Graduate assistant Wide receivers coach; Illinois State (2009–2010) Wide receivers coach; Central Michigan (2011) Wide receivers coach; New Mexico (2012) Wide receivers coach; Wake Forest (2013) Wide receivers coach; Utah (2014–2015) Wide receivers coach; Toronto Argonauts (2016) Wide receivers coach; Air Force (2017–2018) Wide receivers coach; Miami (FL) (2019) Wide receivers coach; Penn State (2020–2022) Wide receivers coach; Air Force (2023–present) Wide receivers coach

Awards and highlights
- Consensus All-American (2004); First-team All-Big Ten (2004); Second-team All-Big Ten (2003); All-Freshman Big Ten

Taylor Evans Stubblefield (born January 21, 1982) is an American football coach and former player who is the wide receivers coach for the Air Force Falcons. He played professionally as a wide receiver for the Carolina Panthers and St. Louis Rams of the National Football League (NFL). He left Purdue University owning the most receptions in National Collegiate Athletic Association (NCAA) history. Stubblefield was most recently the wide receivers coach with the Toronto Argonauts. A three-sport athlete at A.C. Davis High School, Stubblefield committed to the Purdue University to play football for the Boilermakers. In his collegiate debut in 2001, he had five receptions for 65 yards. He led the team in receptions and was named to the All-Freshman Big Ten team by Sporting News. During his sophomore season, he finished with 77 receptions for 789 yards, but didn't record a touchdown catch. As a junior in 2003, Stubblefield earned second-team All-Big Ten honors at the conclusion of the season. In the 2001 Sun Bowl, he had nine catches for a Sun Bowl-record 196 yards. During the 2004 season, Stubblefield was a Biletnikoff Award finalist, earned first-team All-Big Ten honors and was named a consensus All-American.He concluded his college career with an NCAA record of 325 receptions, which he held for seven years, 3,629 yards, and 27 touchdowns. He was inducted into the Purdue Athletic Hall of Fame in 2015 and was also named to the 75th Anniversary Sun Bowl Team.

Despite his college success, Stubblefield was not selected in 2005 NFL draft. He signed as an undrafted free agent with the Carolina Panthers and then signed with the Hamilton Tiger-cats of the Canadian Football League. During the 2006 season he was signed by the St. Louis Rams and later was re-signed by the Tiger-cats.

When the 2007 season came around, Stubblefield hung up his cleats and returned to his home state of Washington, where he was named the wide receivers coach for Central Washington University. The following season, he took the same position with Eastern Michigan, while also working towards his master's degree. For the 2009 and 2010 seasons, he was asked by former Purdue Defense Coordinator Brock Spack to take the wide receivers coaching position at Illinois State. For the Redbirds, Stubblefield coached Eyad Salem, who broke the school's single-season receptions record (92 catches) and twice tied the single-game receptions record with back-to-back 14-catch efforts. Salem was an All-MVFC first-team selection. The next year, he took a job with Central Michigan as their wide receivers coach. After stops at New Mexico and Wake Forest, Stubblefield was hired with a two-year contract at Utah. Utah recorded 9–4, and 10–3 seasons and attended the Las Vegas Bowl both years. Stubblefield's contract was not extended after his original deal and he moved on to coach with the Toronto Argonauts of the CFL for one season before joining Troy Calhoun's staff at the United States Air Force Academy in February 2017. After two seasons with the Air Force Academy Stubblefield moved on to Miami as a member of Manny Diaz's Hurricane staff. In a single season at Miami, he was poached by Penn State where he spent three seasons and developed the most statistically prolific wide receiver corps in the Franklin era. After three seasons with Penn State Stubblefield returned to the Air Force Academy as the Falcon's receivers coach.

== Early years ==
Stubblefield was born in Yakima, Washington. He graduated from A. C. Davis High School in Yakima, where he was a member of the football, basketball and track and field teams. For football, he set school records with 123 receptions, 1,900 receiving yards and 21 touchdowns. He also had the school record for receiving yards and receiving touchdowns in a single game, which was broken by Cooper Kupp in 2011. He was named First Team All-State. He also led the basketball team to the state tournament three times, earning fifth and eighth-place trophies, and was a 1,000 point scorer.

== College career ==
Stubblefield attended Purdue University, located in West Lafayette, Indiana, where he played under head coach Joe Tiller. He played alongside future NFL player Kyle Orton and consensus All-American kicker-punter Travis Dorsch. As a redshirt freshman he led the Boilermakers with 73 receptions. In the 2001 Sun Bowl against Washington State, he tied a Sun Bowl record of nine receptions, and set a record with 196 receiving yards. He also scored two touchdowns and recorded a bowl record with a 244 all-purpose yards. He helped lead the Boilermakers to a second straight Sun Bowl appearance in 2002. As a junior in 2003, Stubblefield led the Big Ten Conference with 86 receptions. He totaled 835 yards and three touchdowns. He was a second-team All-Big Ten selection.

Stubblefield was named a First Team All-Big Ten selection his senior year (2004), in which he caught 89 passes with 1,095 yards receiving and scored 16 touchdowns, third-most in the nation. He became the first player to lead the conference in receptions two consecutive seasons since Ohio State's David Boston in 1998. The All-American participated in the East-West Shrine All-Star Game, where he had seven receptions for 128 yards and scored two touchdowns, while throwing a pass that led to the first touchdown. He became the first consensus All-American receiver for Purdue since Bernie Flowers in 1952 and earned First Team-All Big Ten honors.

With career totals of 3,629 yards and 21 touchdowns, Stubblefield ranked as the all-time NCAA receptions leader with 325 in his college career (until it was broken by Ryan Broyles of the University of Oklahoma on October 15, 2011). His teammate, John Standeford, had set the Big Ten Conference record with 266 receptions in 2003. Stubblefield was named to the Sun Bowl's 75th anniversary team.

=== Statistics ===
		Receiving							Rushing			Kickoff returns					Punt returns
Season	Team	GS	GP	Rec	Yds	Avg	TD	Long	Att	Yds	TD	Att	Yds	Avg	TD	Long	Att	Yds	Avg	TD	Long
2001	Purdue	7	12	73	910	12.5	2	65	2	-2	0	5	114	22.8	0	28	0	0	--	0	--
2002	Purdue	2	10	77	789	10.2	0	24	1	-9	0	0	0	--	0	-	0	0	--	0	--
2003	Purdue	7	13	86	835	9.7	3	43	5	24	0	0	0	--	0	--	0	0	--	0	--
2004	Purdue	12	12	89	1,095	12.3	**16**	97	0	0	0	0	0	--	0	--	16	49	3.1	0	16
	Totals	28	47	**325**	3.629	11.2	21	97	8	13	0	5	114	22.8	0	0	16	49	3.1	0	16

- Numbers in **bold** are Purdue school records

== Professional career ==
=== Carolina Panthers ===
Stubblefield went undrafted by the NFL after his successful college career. He was signed as a free agent by the Carolina Panthers on April 26, 2005.

=== Hamilton Tiger-cats ===
He played during the 2005 season with the Hamilton Tiger-cats in the Canadian Football League.

=== St. Louis Rams ===
On January 6, 2006, Stubblefield was signed to the St. Louis Rams.

=== Return to the Hamilton Tiger-cats ===
Stubblefield returned to the Tiger-cats on March 6, 2007.

== Coaching career ==
=== Central Washington ===
After a brief stint playing at the professional level, Stubblefield returned to his home state of Washington, where he served as a wide receiver coach for the Wildcats at Central Washington University, an NCAA division II program.

=== Eastern Michigan ===
After just one season with Central Washington, Stubblefield joined the Eastern Michigan staff to become an assistant coach under head coach, Jeff Genyk.

=== Illinois State ===
After Genyk was replaced by Ron English, Stubblefield moved on to Illinois State to be an assistant and wide receiver coach. He joined head coach Brock Spack, who was a former defensive coordinator at Purdue. Stubblefield led Eyad Salem to first-team All-Missouri Valley Football Conference honors as he set the school records for receptions in a season with 92 catches.

=== Central Michigan ===
On February 18, 2011, Central Michigan announced the addition of Stubblefield as their wide receivers coach. In his time at CMU Stubblefield developed Titus Davis (who died in 2020) and Cody Wilson, both whom went on to play in the NFL. Stubblefield also mentored former NFL player, author, and dyslexia advocate Deon Butler during his stint at Central before Butler was moved to tight end.

=== New Mexico ===
Stubblefield coached wide receivers for New Mexico in 2012. Inside the triple option offense, Stubblefield developed Lamaar Thomas and Marquis Bundy, both who went on to play in the NFL.

=== Wake Forest ===
Stubblefield moved on to Wake Forest in 2013. Stubblefield coached Michael Campenaro who in his career, recorded 833 yards off of 73 receptions. Alongside Chris Givens, the two teamed up to be the most productive receiving tandem in Wake Forest history. However, injuries sidelined Campanaro for multiple games his junior and senior seasons. He managed to finish sixth in ACC history for career receptions, hauling in 229 passes during his tenure at Wake Forest. He totaled 229 receptions for 2,506 yards and 14 touchdowns in his college football career. Stubblefield also coached Bachelor celebrity, Matt James as member of the Demon Deacon wide receiver corps.

=== Utah ===
In February 2014, Stubblefield was named the wide receivers coach at Utah. While with the Utes Stubblefield coached WR and return specialist Kaelin Clay. He made four different All-American teams as a return specialist in 2014 with Utah and was named first-team All-Pac-12 Conference as a return specialist. He also finished the season with a punt return average of 15.0 and three touchdowns. Also returned a kickoff for a touchdown last season and had a 24.9 average on kickoff returns. Before Clay, a Utah receiver had not been drafted in seven years. Stubblefield also coached Super Bowl Champion Britain Covey while at Utah. He led Utah with 43 catches for 519 yards with four touchdown catches, and was the conference leader in receiving yards per game, total receiving yards, catches per game, touchdown catches and overall receptions, being named honorable mention All-Pac-12. He also played on special teams, leading the team with 916 all-purpose yards and being named first-team Freshman All-American by Sporting News and Scout.com for his work as a punt returner. Covey was named a freshman All-America receiver by Pro Football Focus. NFL wide receiver Tim Patrick also played for Stubblefield at Utah.

=== Air Force ===
After his stint coaching with the Toronto Argonauts, Stubblefield joined Troy Calhoun as the receivers coach for the United States Air Force Academy. In his two seasons, Bennett and Gerard Sanders became record breaking receivers. Stubblefield's receivers averaged 17.7 yards per catch over his two seasons in Colorado Springs. In 2018, senior Marcus Bennett caught 24 passes for 465 and three scores and finished his career with an average of 21.6 yards per catch, ranking fifth in Falcons history. Bennett was also a recipient of the honorable Brian Bullard award.

=== University of Miami ===
Taylor Stubblefield joined the University of Miami football program in January 2019, accepting the position of wide receivers coach. In the 2019 season Stubblefield coached future NFL receivers K.J. Osborn, Mike Harley Jr., and Jeff Thomas. Harley was Miami's all-time receptions leader. Stubblefield's recruit, Xavier Restrepo, would go on to break that record.

=== Penn State ===
Taylor Stubblefield joined the Penn State University football program in January 2020, accepting the position of wide receivers coach.

In 2020, Jahan Dotson led the Big Ten in receiving with 884 yards. Dotson was also tied as the national leader for receptions of over 60 yards (4) and went on to earn honorable mention All-American. Stubblefield also coached Parker Washington to Freshman All American Honors by the athletic. Washington finished the season tied for second nationally among true freshman with 6 touchdown receptions. He also helped tutor true freshmen DeAndre Lambert-Smith alongside Washington, who became the first pair of true freshmen receivers to start in a game for Penn State since 2014. Washington earned freshman All-America honors and set a freshman record at PSU with nine touchdowns. This was statistically one of the best wide receiving corps performances Penn State has ever had.

At the completion of the 2020 season, Stubblefield was given the additional title of Offensive Recruiting Coordinator.

In 2021, Stubblefield's receivers would produce 200 catches for 2,676 yards. That was the most receptions and yards in the Franklin era. That 2021 corps, which included Dotson (91 receptions, 1,182 yards), Parker Washington (64-820) and KeAndre Lambert-Smith (34-521), was the best in Penn State history in a number of categories – total catches (200), total yards (2,676), average yards per game (206) and TD receptions (20, tie for No. 1). Dotson ended his career as Penn State's all-time leader in punt return average (17.8), finished career tied for second all-time at Penn State in career receptions and receiving touchdowns, and fourth in receiving yards. He ended his career as one of 10 Nittany Lions to reach the 2,000 career receiving yards mark. He also owned 11 career 100-yard receiving games, ranking second all-time at Penn State. Dotson was a Biletnikoff and Walter Camp player of the year semifinalist. Dotson was drafted in the first round, 16th overall in the 2022 NFL draft.

In 2022, Washington (who missed three games with a broken leg) would top Penn State's receiver production, followed by transfer portal addition Mitchell Tinsley, Keandre Lambert-Smith and Harrison Wallace III "Tre." Washington, Tinsley, and Lambert-Smith would all go on to play in the NFL. Wallace is currently playing for the Ole Miss Rebels and has amassed 46 receptions for 719 yards through the regular season. Post-season, Penn State would defeat Utah in the Rose Bowl where Lambert-Smith would record three receptions for 124 yards and a touchdown. His 88-yard touchdown reception was the longest pass play in Rose Bowl history.

=== Air Force ===
Upon Stubblefield's return to the United States Air Force Academy in 2023, the Falcons began the season with eight straight wins finding themselves ranked 17th late in the season. From 2023 through 2025 the development of the receiving corps led by Cade Harris and Quin Smith has added a threat through the air, leading to a slight revamp of the offense. Harris was added to the Biletnikoff award watchlist. His season ended with 35 catches for 584 yards. Smith finished the season with 15 catches for 358.
