= 2001 Sun Bowl =

American college football game

2001 Wells Fargo Sun Bowl
Purdue Boilermakers	Washington State Cougars
(6–5)	(9–2)
Big Ten	Pac-10
27	33
Head coach: Joe Tiller	Head coach: Mike Price
	AP / Coaches / BCS; 13 / 13 / 12
	1	2	3	4	Total
Purdue	0	20	0	7	27
Washington State	14	3	13	3	33
- Date: December 31, 2001
- Season: 2001
- Stadium: Sun Bowl
- Location: El Paso, Texas
- Referee: Randy Smith (C-USA)
- Payout: US$1,000,000 per team

United States TV coverage
- Network: CBS
- Announcers: Verne Lundquist, Todd Blackledge, Jill Arrington

The 2001 Wells Fargo Sun Bowl edition to the Sun Bowl featured the Washington State Cougars, and the Purdue Boilermakers.

Washington State's Jason David scored the game's first touchdown on a 45-yard interception return for a 7–0 WSU lead. Washington State quarterback Jason Gesser later threw a 46-yard touchdown pass to Mike Bush to increase the Cougar's lead to 14–0. In the second quarter, Purdue running back Montrell Lowe scored on a 1-yard touchdown run to cut the lead to 14–7.

Kicker Travis Dorsch kicked a 28-yard field goal to pull Purdue to within 14–10. Washington State's Drew Dunning answered with a 47-yard field goal of his own, to move the lead back to 17–10. Purdue quarterback Kyle Orton found wide receiver Taylor Stubblefield for a 3-yard touchdown pass to tie the game at 17. Travis Dorsch's 50-yard field goal before halftime gave Purdue a 20–17 halftime lead.

In the third quarter, Drew Dunning kicked the tying 34-yard field goal. Jason Gesser's subsequent 1-yard touchdown run gave Washington State a 27–20 lead. Drew Dunning added field goals of 30 and 37 yards to give WSU a 33–20 lead. With 1:53 left, Kyle Orton connected with Taylor Stubblefield with a 51-yard touchdown pass to make the final margin 33–27.
