= Tim Stratton =

American football player (born 1979)

No. 89
- Position: Tight end

Personal information
- Born: July 15, 1979 (age 47); Oak Brook, Illinois, U.S.
- Listed height: 6 ft 4 in (1.93 m)
- Listed weight: 253 lb (115 kg)

Career information
- High school: York Community (Elmhurst, Illinois)
- College: Purdue (1998–2001)

Awards and highlights
- John Mackey Award (2000); 3× First-team All-Big Ten (1999, 2000, 2001)
- Stats at ESPN

Timothy William Stratton (born July 15, 1979) is an American former football tight end. He played college football for the Purdue Boilermakers and won the inaugural John Mackey Award in 2000.

Playing at Purdue University from 1998-2001, Stratton was the favorite target of quarterback Drew Brees. He compiled 38 catches for 380 yards (10.0 avg) and 7 touchdowns his freshman year while finishing second nationally among tight ends in all three categories. He was given Honorable Mention All-Big Ten and he was subsequently named to the Sporting News freshman All-American team. He followed up with 49 catches for 593 yards (12.1 avg) and four touchdowns in his sophomore year. While being named First Team All-Big Ten.

His junior year was followed by 56 receptions for 579 yards (10.3 avg) and two touchdowns, being named First Team All-Big Ten, named to the BCS All America Team and winning the inaugural John Mackey Award, given to the nation's top tight end. In his senior year, Stratton caught 47 passes for 423 yards (9.0 avg) and two touchdowns from Kyle Orton, Brees' successor as Boilermaker quarterback. He was named First Team All-Big Ten and becoming just the fourth player in school history to be named First Team All-Big Ten three years in a career. He also finished as a semi-finalist for the John Mackey Award.

By the time Stratton finished his career at Purdue, he was school's all time leader in receptions at 204. He finished 14th on the school's list for touchdowns (15) and finished 20th in yards. His career average of yards per catch was 10.4 yards.

Remembered at Purdue for his "childish energy and immaturity", Stratton nearly got suspended when a fellow student fleeced his helmet while Stratton climbed up the goal post after a come-from-behind win over Michigan.

Prior to college, Stratton played at York Community High School in Elmhurst, Illinois while a resident of Oak Brook, Illinois. Stratton was part of coach Joe Tiller's first recruiting class at Purdue. He resides with his wife and children in Chicago.

== Statistics ==
Year	Team	Receiving			
Year	Team	Rec	Yards	Avg	TD
1998	Purdue	38	381	10.0	7
1999	Purdue	49	593	12.1	4
2000	Purdue	58	605	10.4	2
2001	Purdue	59	509	8.6	2
Totals		204	2,088	10.2	15
