= Greg Olson (American football) =

American football coach (born 1963)

Profile
- Position: Quarterbacks coach

Personal information
- Born: March 1, 1963 (age 63); Richland, Washington, U.S.

Career information
- High school: Richland
- College: Central Washington

Career history
- Washington State (1987–1989) Graduate assistant; Central Washington (1990–1993) Offensive coordinator; Idaho (1994–1996) Quarterbacks coach; Purdue (1997–2000) Quarterbacks coach; San Francisco 49ers (2001) Quarterbacks coach; Purdue (2002) Tight ends coach & recruiting coordinator; Chicago Bears (2003) Quarterbacks coach; Detroit Lions (2004–2005) Offensive coordinator & quarterbacks coach; St. Louis Rams (2006–2007) Offensive coordinator; Tampa Bay Buccaneers (2008–2009) Quarterbacks coach; Tampa Bay Buccaneers (2009–2011) Offensive coordinator & quarterbacks coach; Jacksonville Jaguars (2012) Assistant head coach & quarterbacks coach; Oakland Raiders (2013–2014) Offensive coordinator; Jacksonville Jaguars (2015–2016) Offensive coordinator; Los Angeles Rams (2017) Quarterbacks coach; Oakland / Las Vegas Raiders (2018–2021) Offensive coordinator; Los Angeles Rams (2022) Senior offensive assistant; Seattle Seahawks (2023) Quarterbacks coach; Las Vegas Raiders (2025) Quarterbacks coach; Las Vegas Raiders (2025) Interim offensive coordinator
- Coaching profile at Pro Football Reference

Gregor Alan Olson (born March 1, 1963) is an American football coach. He has been an offensive coordinator for the Detroit Lions, St. Louis Rams, Tampa Bay Buccaneers, Jacksonville Jaguars, and the Oakland / Las Vegas Raiders, and a quarterbacks coach for the Seattle Seahawks.

== Coaching career ==
=== Early career ===
Olson was offensive coordinator and quarterback coach at Central Washington University from 1990–1993, where he coached quarterback Jon Kitna, who later played sixteen seasons in the NFL. While at Central, Olson also coached the wrestling team. Prior to joining the CWU coaching staff, he was a graduate assistant at Washington State University for three seasons; he coached the defensive backs for a season and was the linebacker coach for two years. He also coached running backs at Spokane Falls Community College in 1986.

After leaving CWU, Olson coached quarterbacks at the University of Idaho for three seasons, then moved on to Purdue University in July 1997.

=== Purdue University ===
At Purdue, Olson played a key role in helping OC Jim Chaney in the development of future Pro Bowler and Super Bowl-winning quarterback Drew Brees. Under Chaney and Olson, Brees was a Heisman Trophy finalist in 1999 and 2000 while winning the Maxwell Award as the nation's most outstanding player in 2000, as the Boilermakers won the Big Ten title and met Washington in the Rose Bowl.

Olson previously served as the quarterbacks coach of the Detroit Lions, where he worked with Joey Harrington. He served as Lions offensive coordinator following the firing of Steve Mariucci and the demotion of Ted Tollner during the 2005 season.

=== St. Louis Rams ===
He was the offensive coordinator of the St. Louis Rams from 2006-2007. In his first year with the Rams in 2006, he helped guide a high-powered offense that ranked sixth in the NFL in total offense (360.4 yards per game) and a passing offense that ranked third (247.6) in the NFC. Under Olson's direction the Rams became just the fourth team in NFL history to produce a 4,000 yard passer (Marc Bulger), a 1,500 yard rusher (Steven Jackson) and two 1,000 yard receivers (Torry Holt and Isaac Bruce). Bulger, Holt and Bruce were all selected to the Pro Bowl. Bulger also posted career-highs in passing yards (4,301), passing touchdowns (24), and passing attempts (588) and completions (370) while ranking second in the NFL in interception percentage (1.4%). Jackson also had a career-year in 2006, leading the NFL in yards from scrimmage with 2,334, and he led all NFL running backs with 90 receptions and was fifth in the NFL in rushing yards with 1,528.

=== Tampa Bay Buccaneers ===
In January 2008, Olson was hired by the Tampa Bay Buccaneers to be their quarterbacks coach following the dismissal of Paul Hackett. On September 3, 2009, the day before the team's final preseason game, the Buccaneers announced that Olson would replace Jeff Jagodzinski as offensive coordinator. Olson was responsible for the development of QB Josh Freeman, the 17th overall pick in the 2009 draft. Under Olson's guidance, Freeman threw for 8,898 yards and 51 touchdowns in his first three seasons as a starter. In 2011, Freeman ranked eighth in the NFL with a 62.8 completion percentage and 13th with 3,592 passing yards. In Olson's second season as offensive coordinator with the Bucs in 2010, Freeman ranked sixth in the NFL with a 95.9 passer rating while throwing for 3,451 yards, 25 touchdowns and only six interceptions. Olson helped guide the Buccaneers to one of their best offensive seasons in team history, setting franchise records for yards per play (5.61), average per rush (4.64 yards), average per pass play (7.21), passer rating (96.2) and fewest interceptions thrown (six). The Buccaneers also finished with the fourth-most points scored (341), third-most yards in total offense (5,362) and second-best third down percentage (42.2%) in a single season in team history.

The Buccaneers were the youngest team in the NFL in 2010 and WR Mike Williams, a fourth-round draft pick, finished the year leading all rookie receivers in the league in every major receiving category while setting a single-season team record with 11 touchdown receptions. RB LeGarrette Blount's 1,007 rushing yards led all rookie running backs and he became just the second undrafted rookie running back in NFL history to finish with over 1,000 yards. It marked the first time since 1968 that a team had two different players lead all rookies in rushing and receiving yards. He was fired on January 2, 2012, after his team posted a 4–12 record.

=== Jacksonville Jaguars ===
In January 2012, Olson was hired to be the assistant head coach and quarterbacks coach for the Jacksonville Jaguars.

=== Oakland Raiders ===
In January 2013, Olson was hired to be the offensive coordinator of the Oakland Raiders, taking over for the recently fired Greg Knapp.

In 2014, Olson was fired as offensive coordinator of the Oakland Raiders.

=== Jacksonville Jaguars (second stint) ===
On January 21, 2015, Olson was hired to be the offensive coordinator of the Jacksonville Jaguars.

On October 29, 2016, Olson was fired from Jaguars following a loss to the Tennessee Titans.

=== Los Angeles Rams ===
On January 18, 2017, it was announced by the Los Angeles Times that Olson would be hired by the Los Angeles Rams to serve as the quarterbacks coach, under head coach Sean McVay.

=== Oakland / Las Vegas Raiders (second stint) ===
Following the Rams' elimination from the playoffs, Olson returned to the Oakland Raiders as their offensive coordinator under returning head coach Jon Gruden in January 2018. Olson missed the team's week 15 game in 2020 against the Los Angeles Chargers after he tested positive for COVID-19. For the 2021 season, Olson continued to coach under Gruden and later interim head coach Rich Bisaccia, but was not retained under new head coach Josh McDaniels.

=== Los Angeles Rams (second stint) ===
In 2022, Olson was an offensive assistant for the Los Angeles Rams.

=== Seattle Seahawks ===
In 2023, Olson was hired to be the quarterbacks coach under Pete Carroll.

=== Las Vegas Raiders (third stint) ===
On February 7, 2025, the Raiders hired Olson for the third time but this time as their quarterbacks coach under Pete Carroll and John Spytek. Following the firing of offensive coordinator Chip Kelly, Carroll named Olson interim offensive coordinator, his third stint as OC for the Raiders franchise.
