= Akin Ayodele =

American football player (born 1979)

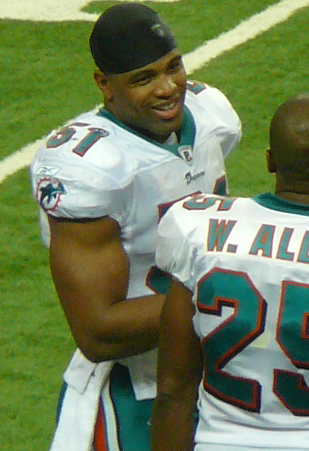
- Ayodele with the Miami Dolphins in 2009

No. 51, 50
- Position: Linebacker

Personal information
- Born: September 17, 1979 (age 47); Dallas, Texas, U.S.
- Listed height: 6 ft 2 in (1.88 m)
- Listed weight: 245 lb (111 kg)

Career information
- High school: Irving (TX) MacArthur
- College: Coffeyville, Purdue
- NFL draft: 2002: 3rd round, 89th overall pick

Career history
- Jacksonville Jaguars (2002–2005); Dallas Cowboys (2006–2007); Miami Dolphins (2008–2009); Denver Broncos (2010)*; Buffalo Bills (2010)
- * Offseason or practice squad member only

Awards and highlights
- First-team All-Big Ten (2001); 2× Second-team All-Big Ten (1999, 2000)

Career NFL statistics
- Total tackles: 742
- Sacks: 9.5
- Forced fumbles: 9
- Fumble recoveries: 10
- Interceptions: 7
- Defensive touchdowns: 1
- Stats at Pro Football Reference

Akinola James Ayodele (/ˈeɪkən ɑːjoʊdɛˈleɪ/; born September 17, 1979) is an American former professional football player who was a linebacker in the National Football League (NFL) for the Jacksonville Jaguars, Dallas Cowboys, Miami Dolphins, and Buffalo Bills. He was selected by the Jacksonville Jaguars in the third round of the 2002 NFL draft. He played college football at Coffeyville Community College and Purdue.

== Early life ==
Ayodele attended MacArthur High School in Irving, Texas. As a senior, he was a two-way player at linebacker and tight end. He tallied 35 tackles, 5 sacks and 8 receptions for 242 yards, while receiving All-District honors. Ayodele was inducted into the Irving Independent School District first Hall of Fame Class in 2012.

== College career ==
=== Coffeyville Community College ===
Although he had good grades in high school, he was missing a course to be able to accept the scholarship from Purdue University, so he enrolled at Coffeyville Community College for one year. As a redshirt freshman, he was switched to defensive end, registering 101 tackles, 7 sacks, 3 forced fumbles and 3 fumble recoveries. He received second-team NJCAA All-American, All-Jayhawk and Mission Conference Defensive Player of the Year honors. At the time, he ranked second on the school all-time tackles for loss in a single-season (33).

=== Purdue ===
As a sophomore, he transferred to Purdue University. He started all of the games at right defensive end, collecting 64 tackles (19 for loss), 11 sacks (fourth in school history), one pass defensed, one forced fumble and one fumble recovery.

As a junior, he started the first 5 games at strongside linebacker and the last 7 at right defensive end. He registered 66 tackles (15 for loss), 9 sacks (tied for second in the Big Ten), 2 interceptions (second on the team), 6 passes defensed (tied for third on the team) and 2 fumble recoveries.

As a senior, he started all of the games at strongside linebacker. He posted 64 tackles, 9 sacks (second in the conference), 20 tackles for loss (sixth in school history), 4 passes defensed, 3 forced fumbles and 2 fumble recoveries. He had 11 tackles (6 for loss), 2 sacks and one pass defensed against the University of Cincinnati. He received the Jimmy Rogers Jr. Most Valuable Lineman trophy at the 2001 Sun Bowl.

He was named first-team All-Big Ten Conference as a senior and second-team All-Conference as a sophomore and junior. He was tied with Jeff Zgonina for second on Purdue's career-record list with 29 sacks, topped only by Rosevelt Colvin with 33. He finished his college career with 194 tackles, 54 tackles for loss (fourth in school history), 2 interceptions, 11 passes defensed, 4 forced fumbles and 5 fumble recoveries.

== Professional career ==
Pre-draft measurables
Height	Weight	Arm length	Hand span	40-yard dash	10-yard split	20-yard split	20-yard shuttle	Three-cone drill	Vertical jump	Broad jump	Bench press
6 ft 2 1/8 in (1.88 m)	257 lb (117 kg)	32 1/2 in (0.83 m)	9 3/4 in (0.25 m)	4.80 s	1.67 s	2.80 s	4.12 s	7.00 s	35.0 in (0.89 m)	10 ft 1 in (3.07 m)	26 reps
All values from NFL Combine

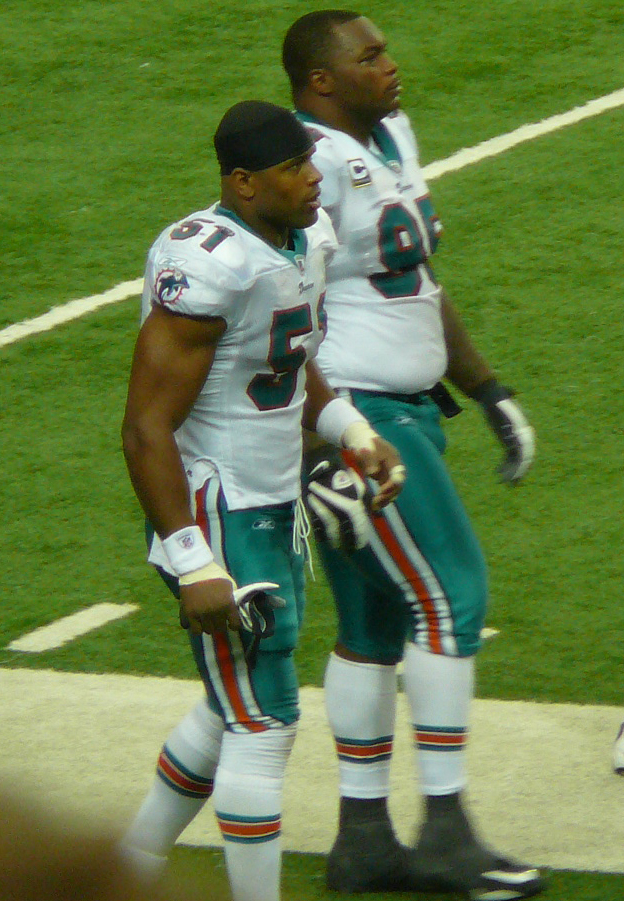
Former Cowboys teammates Ayodele (left) and Jason Ferguson in Miami in 2009.

=== Jacksonville Jaguars ===
Ayodele was selected in the third round (89th overall) of the 2002 NFL draft by the Jacksonville Jaguars, with the intention of playing him at outside linebacker. As a rookie, he had 3 starts at strongside linebacker because of injury to Eric Westmoreland and also saw considerable time as a rush end on passing downs. He registered 108 tackles (fourth on team), 3 sacks, 13 quarterback pressures (led the team), 3 passes defensed, one interception, 2 forced fumbles and 13 special teams tackles (tied for second on the team). He had 10 tackles, one sack and one interception against the Cleveland Browns.

In 2003, he was named a starter at outside linebacker, while posting 150 tackles (second on the team), one sack, 4 passes defensed, 2 interceptions and 3 fumble recoveries. He had 11 tackles, one sack, one quarterback pressure and one interception in the season opener against the Carolina Panthers.

In 2004, he totaled 131 tackles (second on the team), 2 sacks, 3 passes defensed, one forced fumble, one fumble recovery and one blocked field goal. In 2005, he tallied 100 tackles (third on the team) 2.5 sacks, 4 tackles for loss and 4 forced fumbles (led the team). He had 15 tackles and 2 sacks against the Kansas City Chiefs.

=== Dallas Cowboys ===
In 2006, he signed a five-year contract with the Dallas Cowboys as a free agent, to play inside linebacker in the team's 3-4 defense and help shore up their run defense. Coincidentally, as a child growing up in Irving, Ayodele was a ball boy for the Cowboys in high school. He recorded 106 tackles (second on the team), 5 tackles for loss (tied for the team lead), 2 interceptions (third on the team), 4 passes defensed, 2 fumble recoveries and 7 special teams tackles. He started in the NFC Wild Card Playoff Game against the Seattle Seahawks, making 8 tackles.

In 2007, Ayodele had a chance to play on the same team with his brother Remi, while posting 14 starts, 95 tackles (fourth on the team), 4 passes defensed and 3 special teams tackles. He started in the NFC Divisional Playoff Game against the New York Giants, making 6 tackles.

In 2008, after the team signed free agent linebacker Zach Thomas, he became tradable. On April 25, Ayodele was traded along with tight end Anthony Fasano to the Miami Dolphins in exchange for a fourth-round pick (#100-Tyvon Branch) in the 2008 NFL draft.

=== Miami Dolphins ===
In 2008, he reunited with former Cowboys head coach Bill Parcells, who was the team's Executive Vice President of Football Operations with the Miami Dolphins. He tallied 13 starts, 74 tackles (third on the team), 2 interceptions, 4 passes defensed and one fumble recovery. He started in the AFC wild card game against the Baltimore Ravens, tying for a team-high 6 tackles and having one pass defensed.

In 2009, he started in 15 games, recording 70 tackles (third on the team), one forced fumble and 2 fumble recoveries. He had 8 tackles against the Houston Texans. On March 5, 2010, he was released, as he was seen as a liability in pass coverage. Enters the 2010 season having recorded at least one tackle in 71 consecutive games.

=== Denver Broncos ===
On April 24, 2010, Ayodele signed with the Denver Broncos. He was assigned the jersey number 51 and was released on August 24.

=== Buffalo Bills ===
On September 10, 2010, the Buffalo Bills signed Ayodele to take the spot of LB Kawika Mitchell after the team placed him on the injured reserve list. He appeared in 15 games (10 starts), missing the first game of his professional career. He wasn't re-signed at the end of the season.

== NFL career statistics ==
Legend
	Led the league
**Bold**	Career high

=== Regular season ===
Year	Team	Games		Tackles					Interceptions					Fumbles			
Year	Team	GP	GS	Cmb	Solo	Ast	Sck	TFL	Int	Yds	TD	Lng	PD	FF	FR	Yds	TD
2002	JAX	**16**	3	68	59	9	**3.0**	3	1	22	0	**22**	3	2	0	0	0
2003	JAX	**16**	**16**	**116**	**88**	28	1.0	**8**	**2**	15	0	13	**4**	0	**3**	**15**	**1**
2004	JAX	**16**	**16**	93	76	17	2.0	2	0	0	0	0	3	2	1	0	0
2005	JAX	**16**	11	72	56	16	2.5	4	0	0	0	0	1	**4**	1	0	0
2006	DAL	**16**	**16**	84	64	20	1.0	6	**2**	2	0	2	**4**	0	2	2	0
2007	DAL	**16**	14	57	36	21	0.0	1	0	0	0	0	**4**	0	0	0	0
2008	MIA	**16**	13	75	58	17	0.0	2	**2**	**29**	0	17	**4**	0	1	0	0
2009	MIA	**16**	15	71	61	10	0.0	3	0	0	0	0	0	1	2	2	0
2010	BUF	15	10	106	60	**46**	0.0	3	0	0	0	0	**4**	0	0	0	0
		143	114	742	558	184	9.5	32	7	68	0	22	27	9	10	19	1

=== Playoffs ===
Year	Team	Games		Tackles					Interceptions					Fumbles			
Year	Team	GP	GS	Cmb	Solo	Ast	Sck	TFL	Int	Yds	TD	Lng	PD	FF	FR	Yds	TD
2005	JAX	**1**	0	6	**6**	0	0.0	0	0	0	0	0	0	0	0	0	0
2006	DAL	**1**	**1**	**10**	**6**	**4**	0.0	**1**	0	0	0	0	0	0	0	0	0
2007	DAL	**1**	**1**	4	2	2	0.0	0	0	0	0	0	0	0	0	0	0
2008	MIA	**1**	**1**	6	5	1	0.0	0	0	0	0	0	**1**	0	0	0	0
		4	3	26	19	7	0.0	1	0	0	0	0	1	0	0	0	0

== Personal life ==
"Akin" is a short name for "Akinola", which in Yoruba language means 'the brave and wealthy one'. His younger brother Remi Ayodele played defensive tackle in the NFL.
