= Randall Lane =

American football player (born 1976)

No. 84
- Position: Wide receiver

Personal information
- Born: October 15, 1976 (age 50); Chicago, Illinois
- Listed height: 6 ft 1 in (1.85 m)
- Listed weight: 205 lb (93 kg)

Career information
- High school: Chicago (IL) Simeon Career Academy
- College: Purdue
- NFL draft: 2000: undrafted

Career history
- Arizona Cardinals (2000)*; Chicago Rush (2002)*; Columbus Destroyers (2005)
- * Offseason or practice squad member only

Career AFL statistics
- Receptions: 20
- Receiving yards: 226
- Touchdowns: 5
- Stats at ArenaFan.com

Randall Marquise Lane (born October 15, 1976) is an American former football wide receiver in the National Football League and Arena Football League. He was signed Arizona Cardinals as an undrafted free agent in 2000. He played college football at Purdue and Los Angeles Valley College. On March 24, 2002, Lane was waived by the Chicago Rush.
