= John Standeford =

American football player (born 1982)

No. 16, 84, 85, 82
- Position: Wide receiver

Personal information
- Born: April 15, 1982 (age 44); Monrovia, Indiana, U.S.
- Listed height: 6 ft 4 in (1.93 m)
- Listed weight: 206 lb (93 kg)

Career information
- High school: Monrovia
- College: Purdue
- NFL draft: 2004: undrafted

Career history
- Washington Redskins (2004)*; Indianapolis Colts (2004–2007); Detroit Lions (2008–2009); Florida Tuskers (2010); Virginia Destroyers (2011)*; Cincinnati Bengals (2011)*; Virginia Destroyers (2011–2012)
- * Offseason or practice squad member only

Awards and highlights
- Super Bowl champion (XLI); UFL champion (2011); First-team All-Big Ten (2002); Second-team All-Big Ten (2003)

Career NFL statistics
- Receptions: 16
- Receiving yards: 249
- Stats at Pro Football Reference

John William Standeford (born April 15, 1982) is an American former professional football player who was a wide receiver in the National Football League (NFL). He played college football for the Purdue Boilermakers, and signed with the Washington Redskins as an undrafted free agent in 2004. He was also a member of the Indianapolis Colts, Detroit Lions, Florida Tuskers, Cincinnati Bengals, and Virginia Destroyers. As a member of the Colts, Standeford won Super Bowl XLI, defeating the Chicago Bears.

== Early life ==
Standeford started his football career at Monrovia High School in Monrovia, Indiana, near Indianapolis. He was an Indiana All-Star in basketball and football, but chose football as his profession.

== College career ==
After high school, Standeford attended Purdue University in West Lafayette, Indiana to play under head coach Joe Tiller. He graduated holding the Big Ten's all-time career receptions record with 266 catches and had a career record of 14 catches in a game against Wisconsin during his senior season. He was teamed with New Orleans Saints quarterback, Drew Brees, and both hold the conference record for most touchdown pass connections and following quarterback Kyle Orton of the Denver Broncos. He majored in Elementary Education and did his student teaching at Attica Elementary School in Attica, Indiana.

His brother, Jake, who was also a multiple sports star in high school, was a wide receiver at Purdue from 2004 to 2007. One season later after becoming the conference career receptions leader, John's teammate, Taylor Stubblefield, set it as a new NCAA record with 325. John was named a First-team-All Big Ten selection in 2002, while being a First-team Academic All-American in 2002 & 2003.

== Professional career ==
=== Washington Redskins and Indianapolis Colts ===
Standeford went undrafted in the 2004 NFL draft and was signed by the Washington Redskins. He was soon traded to the Indianapolis Colts, where he played for three seasons under head coach Tony Dungy, mainly on the practice squad. Playing in a handful of preseason games, he never appeared in an official game as a Colt. He was a member of the Indianapolis Colts' Super Bowl XLI team.

=== Detroit Lions ===
After playing with the Colts primarily on the practice squad, he was traded to the Detroit Lions where he received some playing time. He appeared in nine games during the 2008 season, starting in four of them. He had 15 receptions for 244 yards. He averaged 16.3 yards per catch with a career long of 36 yards.

Standeford signed a one-year contract with the Lions during the 2009 offseason, and was waived on November 7, 2009.

=== Virginia Destroyers ===
Standeford was signed by the Virginia Destroyers of the United Football League on June 28, 2011.

=== Cincinnati Bengals ===
Standeford was signed by the Cincinnati Bengals on August 11, 2011, but was waived on August 23.
