= Chukky Okobi =

American football player (born 1978)

No. 56, 55
- Position: Center

Personal information
- Born: November 18, 1978 (age 47); Pittsburgh, Pennsylvania, U.S.
- Listed height: 6 ft 1 in (1.85 m)
- Listed weight: 305 lb (138 kg)

Career information
- College: Purdue
- NFL draft: 2001: 5th round, 146th overall pick

Career history
- Pittsburgh Steelers (2001–2006); Arizona Cardinals (2007); Houston Texans (2008)*
- * Offseason or practice squad member only

Awards and highlights
- Super Bowl champion (XL); Second-team All-Big Ten (1998)

Career NFL statistics
- Games played: 78
- Games started: 7
- Stats at Pro Football Reference

Chukwunweze Sonume "Chukky" Okobi (born November 18, 1978) is an American former professional football player who was a center. He was selected by the Pittsburgh Steelers in the fifth round of the 2001 NFL draft. He played college football for the Purdue Boilermakers.

Okobi earned a Super Bowl ring with the Steelers in Super Bowl XL against the Seattle Seahawks. He was also a member of the Arizona Cardinals and Houston Texans. Okobi is also a commercial actor.

== Early life ==
He attended Trinity-Pawling School in New York, where he was an All-conference football player as a junior and senior. He also lettered in baseball twice and earned one letter in track and field.

== College career ==
Okobi received a scholarship offer from Purdue head coach, Jim Colletto in January 1996. Although he received much interest from several division I programs, it was the only full scholarship offer that he received. He redshirted in 1996 and went on to be a 4-year starter at Purdue at right guard (1997–99) and center (2000) under head coach, Joe Tiller. He was named to the All-Big Ten Second-team in 1998 as a sophomore and received preseason accolades from many publications going into the 1999 season, including several All American nods. But prior to his junior season, he suffered a torn biceps in training camp and was expected to miss the entire '99 season. He returned and started the final 6 games of that season. In 2000, he moved from right guard to center and helped Purdue win its first Big Ten title in 34 years and a BCS Bowl berth (Rose Bowl). He was the center for Heisman Trophy finalist and New Orleans Saints quarterback Drew Brees and started on an offensive line that featured 5 future NFL players, including New England Patriots All-Pro Tackle, Matt Light. He started at right guard in the Hula Bowl All-Star game in Maui following the 2000 season.

== Professional career ==
=== Pittsburgh Steelers ===
He was selected with the 15th pick of the fifth round of the 2001 NFL draft. He has played in many games since then, usually platooning the center position with Jeff Hartings, and replacing Hartings when he is injured or otherwise unable to play. During the 2006 season, Hartings suffered a minor knee injury that thrust Okobi into action: he started the last five games. On February 2, Jeff Hartings retired from the NFL. Okobi entered training camp as the starting center, but was replaced by Sean Mahan.

=== Arizona Cardinals ===
On September 1, 2007, Okobi was released from the Steelers. He was signed by the Arizona Cardinals.

=== Houston Texans ===
Okobi was signed by the Houston Texans on January 15, 2008. He was placed on season-ending injured reserve with a triceps injury on May 22, and released with an injury settlement on June 2.

== After football ==
Okobi has been involved in several different aspects of entertainment since his departure from the NFL. He dabbled in songwriting and hip hop, collaborating on projects with successful artists such as Pittsburgh Slim and Margot B., as well as being produced by E. Dan, a producer that has been credited with launching the career of rapper Wiz Khalifa. He has been a member of the Screen Actors Guild since 2006 and has starred in commercials for ESPN, Campbell's Chunky Soup, and the Pennsylvania Lottery.

Okobi debuted his rap career with the hit "Buctown!", a song pertaining to the success of the 2011 Pittsburgh Pirates. He has also had various different business dealings, including partnering with entrepreneur Danny White to open car washes in the Pittsburgh area.
