= Matt Light =

American football player (born 1978)

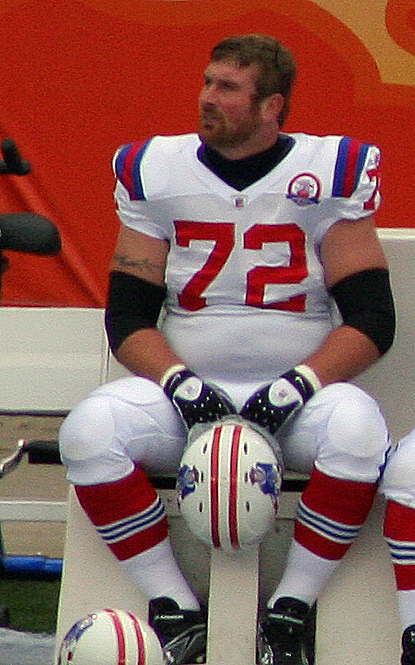
- Light with the New England Patriots in 2009

No. 72
- Position: Offensive tackle

Personal information
- Born: June 23, 1978 (age 48); Greenville, Ohio, U.S.
- Listed height: 6 ft 5 in (1.96 m)
- Listed weight: 305 lb (138 kg)

Career information
- High school: Greenville (OH)
- College: Purdue (1996–2000)
- NFL draft: 2001: 2nd round, 48th overall pick

Career history
- New England Patriots (2001–2011)

Awards and highlights
- 3× Super Bowl champion (XXXVI, XXXVIII, XXXIX); First-team All-Pro (2007); 3× Pro Bowl (2006, 2007, 2010); New England Patriots All-2000s Team; New England Patriots 50th Anniversary Team; New England Patriots All-Dynasty Team; New England Patriots Hall of Fame; Madden Most Valuable Protectors Award (2010); First-team All-Big Ten (2000); Second-team All-Big Ten (1999)

Career NFL statistics
- Games played: 155
- Games started: 153
- Fumble recoveries: 2
- Stats at Pro Football Reference

Matthew Charles Light (born June 23, 1978) is an American former professional football player who spent his entire 11-year career as an offensive tackle for the New England Patriots of the National Football League (NFL). He played college football for the Purdue Boilermakers. He was picked by the Patriots in the second round of the 2001 NFL draft.

== Early life ==
Light was born in Greenville, Ohio. He attended Greenville High School, where he played football for the Green Wave as a three-year two-way starter. On defense, he played linebacker and was a second-team Division II all-state selection at the position, and as a senior earned all-county, all-conference, and all-district honors after making 69 tackles and forcing two fumbles. On offense, he played guard as a sophomore, tackle as a junior, and tight end as a senior, when he caught four passes for 75 yards and a touchdown. He also competed in the shot put in track and field, and was a district champion as well as an all-county and all-conference selection.

== College career ==
Light attended Purdue University, where he played for the Purdue Boilermakers football team from 1996 to 2000. He began his career as a true freshman tight end in 1996, appearing in seven games as a reserve and making one reception for 16 yards. He redshirted the 1997 season after undergoing left shoulder surgery in the spring. In 1998, he moved to left tackle, starting 13 games and earning an honorable mention All-Big Ten Conference selection as part of an offensive line that allowed only 16 sacks of future Super Bowl MVP quarterback Drew Brees. In 1999, Light started 12 games for an offensive line that allowed just 15 sacks, earning second-team All-Big Ten honors. In the 2000 season, Light earned first-team All-Big Ten recognition after starting 12 games at left tackle, helping an offensive line that gave up only seven sacks en route to a Big Ten title and Rose Bowl Game appearance.

== Professional career ==
Pre-draft measurables
Height	Weight	Arm length	Hand span	40-yard dash	10-yard split	20-yard split	20-yard shuttle	Three-cone drill	Bench press
6 ft 4 3/4 in (1.95 m)	311 lb (141 kg)	33 1/2 in (0.85 m)	9 in (0.23 m)	5.24 s	1.84 s	3.05 s	4.49 s	7.84 s	26 reps
All values from NFL Combine

=== New England Patriots ===
Light was drafted in the second round (48th overall) of the 2001 NFL draft by the New England Patriots. He started 12 of 14 games played during his rookie season in 2001, helping a Patriots running game which averaged 112.2 yards per game. He was the starting left tackle for an offensive line that led the way for 133 yards on 25 carries (5.3 yard average) in the Patriots 20–17 victory in Super Bowl XXXVI over the St. Louis Rams. He was named to the Football News 2001 NFL All-Rookie Team following the season. Light returned in 2002 to start all 16 games at left tackle for the Patriots, who missed the playoffs.

In 2003, Light again started 16 games, and earned his second Super Bowl ring after helping to not allow a sack against a Carolina Panthers defensive line in Super Bowl XXXVIII that featured Kris Jenkins, Mike Rucker, Brentson Buckner and Julius Peppers. Light was a part of an offensive line that enjoyed one of the most successful seasons in club history in 2004, starting 16 games at left tackle and helping the team to average more than four yards per carry for the first time in 19 seasons and helping Corey Dillon set a single season franchise record with 1,635 rushing yards. In October 2004, he signed a six-year contract extension with the team worth $27 million. He earned his third Super Bowl ring in a win over the Philadelphia Eagles in Super Bowl XXXIX.

Light began the 2005 season just as he did the previous three, starting at left tackle before a broken leg suffered against the Pittsburgh Steelers in Week 3 kept him inactive for the next 11 games and eventually led to his placement on injured reserve on December 22. He returned in 2006 to start 16 games. His play earned him an appearance in the 2007 Pro Bowl, the first Pro Bowl appearance of his career, where he replaced the injured Jonathan Ogden.

In 2007, Light started 16 games and all three playoff games for the Patriots, including their loss to the New York Giants in Super Bowl XLII, when the Patriots offensive line allowed five sacks of quarterback Tom Brady. He was one of eight Patriots players, and one of three Patriots offensive linemen (joining Dan Koppen and Logan Mankins) elected in December 2007 to the 2008 Pro Bowl.

In the 2008 season, started 16 games for the sixth time in his career. After being named to the Patriots 50th anniversary team in August 2009, Light started the first five games of 2009 before missing five games due to an injury. He returned in Week 12 and started the remainder of the season at left tackle. In 2010, Light started all 16 games at left tackle and was named as an injury replacement to the 2010 Pro Bowl.

On July 31, 2011, Matt Light signed a two-year contract with the New England Patriots.

At the end of the 2011 season, Light and the Patriots appeared in Super Bowl XLVI. He started in the game, but the Patriots lost to the New York Giants by a score of 21–17.

=== Retirement/broadcasting career ===
On May 7, 2012, he officially announced his retirement in a press conference at Gillette Stadium.

On July 19, 2012, it was announced that Light would join ESPN as an NFL analyst. He will contribute to SportsCenter, Sunday NFL Countdown, NFL Live, First Take, and NFL32.

=== Political career ===
On May 2, 2022, Light lost his bid for a seat on the Foxborough, MA, School Committee.

== Personal life ==
Light has Crohn's disease.

Matt married his wife Susie in 2001.

Matt and Susie founded a charitable organization in 2003, called the Light Foundation.

Light is a hunter and has made multiple guest appearances on the television show Buck Commander on Outdoor Channel as an “honorary buckman.”
