= Joe Odom =

American football player (born 1979)

No. 59
- Position: Linebacker

Personal information
- Born: December 14, 1979 (age 46); Alton, Illinois, U.S.
- Listed height: 6 ft 1 in (1.85 m)
- Listed weight: 240 lb (109 kg)

Career information
- High school: Civic Memorial (Bethalto, Illinois)
- College: Purdue
- NFL draft: 2003: 6th round, 191st overall pick

Career history
- Chicago Bears (2003–2005); Buffalo Bills (2006)

Career NFL statistics
- Tackles: 58
- Fumble recoveries: 2
- Passes defended: 1
- Stats at Pro Football Reference

Joseph Edward Odom (born December 14, 1979) is an American former professional football player who was a linebacker in the National Football League (NFL). He was selected by the Chicago Bears in the sixth round of the 2003 NFL draft. He played college football for the Purdue Boilermakers.

== Early life and college ==
Odom attended Civic Memorial High School in Bethalto, Illinois. He played college football at Purdue University from 1999 to 2002.

== Professional career ==
=== Chicago Bears ===
Odom was selected by the Chicago Bears in the sixth round, with the 191st overall pick, of the 2003 NFL draft. He officially signed with the team on June 9, 2003. He played in 10 games, starting three, for the Bears in 2003, recording 21 solo tackles, seven assisted tackles, one pass breakup and one fumble recovery. Odom was placed on injured reserve on November 21, 2003.

He played in 16 games, starting five, in 2004, totaling 23 solo tackles and six assisted tackles. He appeared in two games in 2005, recording one solo tackle and one fumble recovery, before being placed on injured reserve on October 8, 2005. He was waived on August 21, 2006.

=== Buffalo Bills ===
On August 22, 2006, Odom was claimed off of waivers by the Buffalo Bills. He was waived/injured on September 2 and reverted to injured reserve the next day.

== Personal life ==
Odom was later an account executive for Stephen Gould Corporation.
