= Scott Downing =

American football player and coach

Current position
- Title: Vice president of strategy and engagement
- Team: Sterling College

Biographical details
- Born: November 7, 1956 (age 69); Kansas City, Missouri, U.S.

Playing career
- 1975–1978: Sterling

Coaching career (HC unless noted)
- 1980–1981: Sterling (OL)
- 1982–1983: Sterling
- 1984–1986: Nebraska (GA/FHC)
- 1987–1990: Wyoming (LB)
- 1991–1994: Wyoming (DC/LB)
- 1995–1996: Wyoming (AHC/RB/ST)
- 1997–2002: Purdue (AHC/RC/RB)
- 2003–2005: Nebraska (RC/TE)
- 2006–2010: Northern Colorado
- 2011–2014: Tulsa (AHC/ST/TE)
- 2015: Toronto Argonauts (ST)
- 2016–2018: Liberty (ST/RB)

Head coaching record
- Overall: 22–51–1

Scott Downing (born November 7, 1956) is an American college administrator and former football coach. He is the vice president of strategy and engagement at Sterling College in Sterling, Kansas. He served as the head football coach at Sterling from 1982 to 1983 and University of Northern Colorado from 2006 to 2010.

== Playing history ==
Downing played college football at Sterling College in Sterling, Kansas as an offensive lineman and punter. He was team captain for the 1977 and 1978 seasons and was a letterman for all four years he played.

== Coaching career ==
=== Sterling ===
After working as an assistant coach for his alma mater, Downing became the head football coach for Sterling in his first head coaching job. He held the position for the 1982 and 1983 seasons. His coaching record at Sterling was 13–4–1.

=== Northern Colorado ===
Downing was the head coach at the University of Northern Colorado in Greeley for five years, from 2006 to 2010. After five seasons, his teams had managed only 9 wins to 47 losses.

== Head coaching record ==
Year	Team	Overall	Conference	Standing	Bowl/playoffs
Sterling Warriors (Kansas Collegiate Athletic Conference) (1982–1983)
1982	Sterling	7–2	7–2	3rd	
1983	Sterling	6–2–1	6–2–1	3rd	
Sterling:		13–4–1	13–4–1		
Northern Colorado Bears (Big Sky Conference) (2006–2010)
2006	Northern Colorado	1–10	0–8	9th	
2007	Northern Colorado	1–11	1–7	9th	
2008	Northern Colorado	1–10	1–7	T–8th	
2009	Northern Colorado	3–8	1–7	T–7th	
2010	Northern Colorado	3–8	2–6	7th	
Northern Colorado:		9–47	5–35		
Total:		22–51–1			
