= Jim Chaney =

American football coach (born 1962)

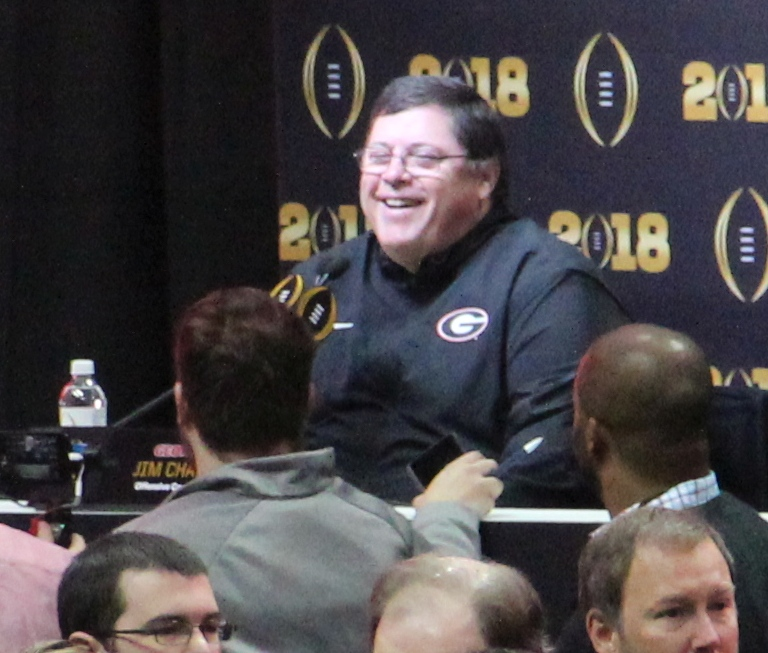
- Chaney in 2018

Tennessee Volunteers
- Title: Offensive analyst

Personal information
- Born: January 12, 1962 (age 64); Holden, Missouri, U.S.

Career information
- College: Central Missouri State

Career history
- Cal State Fullerton (1985–1987) Assistant; Western Michigan (1988) Offensive line coach; Cal State Fullerton (1989–1992) Offensive coordinator & offensive line coach; Wyoming (1993) Graduate assistant; Wyoming (1994–1996) Offensive line coach & recruiting coordinator; Purdue (1997–2001) Offensive coordinator & recruiting coordinator; Purdue (2002–2005) Offensive coordinator; St. Louis Rams (2006–2007) Offensive line coach; St. Louis Rams (2008) Tight ends coach; Tennessee (2009–2011) Offensive coordinator & running backs coach; Tennessee (2012) Offensive coordinator & quarterbacks coach; Tennessee (2012) Interim head coach; Arkansas (2013–2014) Offensive coordinator & quarterbacks coach; Pittsburgh (2015) Offensive coordinator & quarterbacks coach; Georgia (2016–2018) Offensive coordinator & quarterbacks coach; Tennessee (2019–2020) Offensive coordinator; New Orleans Saints (2021) Offensive analyst; Georgia Tech (2022) Offensive analyst; Texas A&M (2023) Offensive analyst; Georgia State (2024) Offensive coordinator; Georgia State (2025) Offensive analyst; Tennessee (2025–present) Offensive analyst

Head coaching record
- Regular season: NCAA: 1–0 (1.000)
- Career: NCAA: 1–0 (1.000)

James Allen Chaney (born January 12, 1962) is an American football coach and former player. He is an offensive analyst for the University of Tennessee, a position he has held since 2025. He previously served as an offensive analyst for the Texas A&M Aggies and Georgia State University. Chaney previously served as the offensive coordinator for the University of Georgia from 2016 to 2018. Chaney also served as the offensive coordinator at University of Arkansas from 2013 to 2014 and University of Tennessee from 2009 to 2012, assuming the role of interim head coach for the final game of the 2012 season after Derek Dooley was fired. He was also the offensive coordinator at the University of Tennessee from 2019 to 2020, under Head Coach Jeremy Pruitt

== Coaching career ==
Chaney served as the offensive coordinator and multiple other assistant positions for other NCAA football programs such as: Purdue, Wyoming, Cal State Fullerton, and Western Michigan. Between 2006 and 2009, he served as an assistant coach for the St. Louis Rams of the National Football League (NFL), working with the offensive line and tight ends. Chaney was brought to Tennessee in 2009 by Lane Kiffin. After the hiring of Derek Dooley in January 2010, it was confirmed that Chaney would remain at Tennessee as the offensive coordinator. Tennessee named Chaney as the interim head coach on November 18, 2012, after it fired Dooley. Six days later, Chaney won his only game as interim head coach as Tennessee defeated Kentucky 37–17. Following his time at Tennessee, he had roles at Arkansas, Pitt, and Georgia as offensive coordinator and quarterbacks coach. On January 8, 2019, Chaney was hired to return to the University of Tennessee to serve as Jeremy Pruitt's Offensive Coordinator. Following his departure at Tennessee, he was an offensive analyst for the New Orleans Saints and later Georgia Tech and Texas A&M. He was named the offensive coordinator for Georgia State starting in the 2024 season. He transitioned into an analyst role for Georgia State following the 2024 season.

== Offensive philosophy ==
While at Purdue, Chaney, along with head coach Joe Tiller, became known for using the spread offense – famously dubbed "basketball on grass" – at a time when it was still considered a novelty and not commonly used. The system relied on a strong passing game and Chaney's offense was one of the most potent in the country. This was evidenced by the fact that future Super Bowl-winning quarterback Drew Brees (starting quarterback from 1998-2000) thrived in Chaney's offense and went on to break and set college, Big Ten and NCAA records.

When Urban Meyer took his first coaching job at Bowling Green, he sought advice from several coaches using the spread offense, including Jim Chaney. After spending a few years in the NFL, Chaney gained a newfound appreciation for the pro-style offense. When Chaney came to Tennessee, he and Kiffin fielded a very pro-style offense, very similar to what Kiffin used at USC.

== Head coaching record ==
Year	Team	Overall	Conference	Standing	Bowl/playoffs
Tennessee Volunteers (Southeastern Conference) (2012)
2012	Tennessee	1–0	1–0	6th (Eastern)	
Tennessee:		1–0	1–0		
Total:		1–0			
