= Brock Spack =

American football player and coach (born 1962)

Current position
- Title: Head coach
- Team: Illinois State
- Conference: MVFC
- Record: 131–82 (.615)
- Annual salary: US$300,000

Biographical details
- Born: January 5, 1962 (age 64); Rockford, Illinois, U.S.
- Education: Purdue University; Eastern Illinois University

Playing career
- 1980–1983: Purdue
- Position: Linebacker

Coaching career (HC unless noted)
- 1984–1985: Purdue (GA)
- 1986: Wabash (assistant ST)
- 1987–1990: Eastern Illinois (assistant ST)
- 1991–1994: Purdue (DB)
- 1995–1996: Wyoming (DC)
- 1997–2008: Purdue (DC)
- 2009–present: Illinois State

Head coaching record
- Overall: 131–82
- Tournaments: 12–7 (NCAA D-I playoffs)

Accomplishments and honors

Championships
- 2 MVFC (2014–2015)

Awards
- First-team All-Big Ten (1981)

Brock D. Spack (born January 5, 1962) is an American college football coach. He is the head football coach at Illinois State University, position he has held since December 2008. Previously, he was the defensive coordinator at Purdue University under Joe Tiller.

== College career ==
Spack played linebacker at Purdue from 1980 to 1983, earning first-team All-Big Ten and honorable mention All-America honors as a sophomore. He was a three-year starter and currently ranks fifth on the Boilermakers' career tackles list with 384. He graduated from Purdue in 1984 with a bachelor's degree in social studies and earned a master's degree in physical education from Eastern Illinois University in 1990.

== Coaching career ==
After graduation, he was a graduate assistant in football at Purdue for the 1984 & 1985 seasons, where he worked with Joe Tiller (defensive coordinator) and Jim Colletto (offensive coordinator) under head coach Leon Burtnett. When Jim Colletto was hired to replace Fred Akers after the 1990 season, he retained Brock as a defensive coach from 1991–1994. For the 1995 season, Joe Tiller hired Brock Spack as defensive coordinator at Wyoming, where he coached two seasons before following Joe Tiller to Purdue in 1997 and remained defensive coordinator until 2008.

In the 2008 season, Danny Hope was hired to return to Purdue to become head coach in 2009 upon Joe Tiller's retirement. Spack had interviewed for the position, but Hope had the edge with head coaching experience that Spack lacked. Spack coached with Hope during the 2008 season under Tiller and had indicated his intention to stay on Hope's staff, but ultimately, when offered a head coaching position at Illinois State, Spack decided to leave his alma mater starting with the 2009 season.

During the 2021 season, Spack became the winningest coach in Illinois State history; passing Edwin Struck's mark of 86 wins. During the 2023 season, Spack reached the 100-win plateau with the Redbirds win over Missouri State on November 4. In the 2025 season, the Redbirds reached the FCS Championship game but lost to Montana State, 35-34 in overtime.

== Personal life ==
A native of Rockford, Illinois, Spack and his wife, Aimee, a former Purdue cheerleader, have two children, Alicia who played softball for Purdue and Brent, who was a linebacker for Illinois State.

== Head coaching record ==
Year	Team	Overall	Conference	Standing	Bowl/playoffs	TSN/STATS^{#}	Coaches^{°}
Illinois State Redbirds (Missouri Valley Football Conference) (2009–present)
2009	Illinois State	6–5	5–3	T–3rd			
2010	Illinois State	6–5	4–4	T–3rd			
2011	Illinois State	7–4	5–3	3rd		18	17
2012	Illinois State	9–4	5–3	T–3rd	L NCAA Division I Quarterfinal	8	9
2013	Illinois State	5–6	4–4	6th			
2014	Illinois State	13–2	7–1	T–1st	L NCAA Division I Championship	2	2
2015	Illinois State	10–3	7–1	T–1st	L NCAA Division I Quarterfinal	6	6
2016	Illinois State	6–6	4–4	T–4th	L NCAA Division I First Round		
2017	Illinois State	6–5	4–4	T–5th			
2018	Illinois State	6–5	3–5	T–6th			
2019	Illinois State	10–5	5–3	T–3rd	L NCAA Division I Quarterfinal	7	7
2020–21	Illinois State	1–3	1–3	T–7th			
2021	Illinois State	4–7	2–6	T–9th			
2022	Illinois State	6–5	4–4	T–6th			
2023	Illinois State	6–5	4–4	T–7th			
2024	Illinois State	10–4	6–2	T–4th	L NCAA Division I Second Round	11	10
2025	Illinois State	12–5	5–3	T–3rd	L NCAA Division I Championship	2	2
2026	Illinois State	8–3	4–3	TBD		12	13
Illinois State:		131–82	79–60				
Total:		131–82 (.615)					
National championship Conference title Conference division title or championship game berth
