= Joe Tiller =

American football player and coach (1942–2017)

Biographical details
- Born: December 7, 1942; Toledo, Ohio, U.S.
- Died: September 30, 2017 (aged 74); Buffalo, Wyoming, U.S.

Playing career
- 1960–1963: Montana State
- 1964: Calgary Stampeders
- Position: Offensive tackle

Coaching career (HC unless noted)
- 1965–1970: Montana State (OL/DL)
- 1971: Washington State (DL)
- 1972–1973: Washington State (OC/OL)
- 1974–1982: Calgary Stampeders (assistant)
- 1976: Calgary Stampeders (interim HC)
- 1983–1986: Purdue (AHC/DC/DL)
- 1987–1988: Wyoming (OC/OL)
- 1989–1990: Washington State (AHC/OC/OL)
- 1991–1996: Wyoming
- 1997–2008: Purdue

Head coaching record
- Overall: 126–92–1 (college); 2–3–1 (CFL)
- Bowls: 4–7

Accomplishments and honors

Championships
- 1 WAC (1993); 1 Big Ten (2000); 1 WAC Pacific Division (1996)

Awards
- Big Ten Coach of the Year (1997); WAC Coach of the Year (1996)

Joseph Henry Tiller (December 7, 1942 – September 30, 2017) was an American football offensive lineman and coach. He served as the interim head coach of the Calgary Stampeders in 1976, the head coach of the University of Wyoming from 1991 to 1996, and Purdue University from 1997 to 2008. During his career he amassed a record of 126–92–1 (.578). Tiller played college football at Montana State from 1960 to 1963 and had a brief stint in the Canadian Football League (CFL) in 1964. Tiller was known as one of the innovators of the spread offense.

Tiller was born in Toledo, Ohio. After graduation from high school, Tiller enrolled at Montana State University and played offensive line for the Bobcats, starting for three seasons. The Boston Patriots selected Tiller in the eighteenth round of the 1964 AFL draft. He played 1 year as an offensive lineman in the CFL, with the Calgary Stampeders in 1964.

Tiller returned to his alma mater, Montana State University, in 1965 as an offensive line coach. After helping the Bobcats to three consecutive Big Sky championships in 1966, 1967, and 1968, he reunited with Sweeney when he became the line coach and offensive coordinator for Washington State. Tiller then became an assistant with the Calgary Stampeders, eventually serving as the interim head coach in 1976, where he led the team to their only two wins of that season. He then spent the eight seasons as an assistant at Purdue from 1983 to 1986, Wyoming from 1987 to 1988, and Washington State from 1989 to 1990.

Tiller accepted the job as head football coach for the University of Wyoming Cowboys in 1991. Tiller led the team to one Western Athletic Conference (WAC) title, and a berth in the WAC Championship Game in 1996. In 1997, he was hired by Purdue as head coach, replacing Jim Colletto. In 2000, Tiller led the Boilermakers to their first Big Ten Conference title since 1967. In 2008, he passed Jack Mollenkopf as Purdue's all-time winningest head coach.

== Early life and playing career ==
Born and raised in Toledo, Ohio, Tiller attended Rogers High School. Upon his high school graduation, he attended Montana State University in Bozeman, where he played football for the Bobcats under head coaches Herb Agocs and Jim Sweeney, and was a member of Delta Sigma Phi fraternity. As a senior in 1963, Tiller was named an Honorable Mention All-American and was invited to the East–West Shrine Game.

Tiller was selected in the 1964 AFL draft by the Boston Patriots; he was the 140th pick overall (18th round) but chose to sign with the Calgary Stampeders of the Canadian Football League. After one season in the CFL, he returned to Montana State to begin his coaching career under Sweeney.

== Coaching career ==
=== Early career ===
Tiller's first coaching job came in 1964, when he was a student assistant for Montana State. The following year, he was promoted to full-time assistant coach, working with offensive and defensive lineman, as well as an instructor in physical education. Sweeney left after the 1967 season and Tiller was retained by new head coach Tom Parac.

In 1971, Tiller rejoined Sweeney as the defensive line coach at Washington State in Pullman. In 1972, he was promoted to offensive coordinator and offensive line coach. During the 1973 season, he helped Andrew Jones to a season where he ran for 1,059 yards with 9 TD and averaged 96.3 rushing YPG.

In 1974, Tiller returned to the Calgary Stampeders as an assistant coach and spent the next eight seasons in the Calgary organization; he served as the interim head coach for the final six weeks of the 1976 season, posting a 2–3–1 (.417) record and the team finished at 2–12–2 (.188). He returned to the front office through 1982.

In 1983, Tiller became defensive coordinator at Purdue under head coach Leon Burtnett. Guided by junior quarterback Jim Everett, the 1984 team became the first in school history to defeat Notre Dame, Michigan, and Ohio State in the same season. Finishing 7–4 in the regular season, the Boilermakers accepted an invitation to play in the Peach Bowl, where they were defeated by Virginia, 27–24. Tiller was let go at the end of the 1986 season when Burtnett resigned.

Taking over as the offensive coordinator at Wyoming in 1987, where Craig Burnett threw for 3,131 yards with 21 TD vs 16 INT and Gerald Abraham ran for 1,305 yards with 13 TD. In 1988, Randy Welniak threw for 2,791 yards with 21 TD vs 11 INT and ran for 415 yards with 16 TD. RB Dabby Dawson ran for 1,119 yards and 9 TD as well.

As offensive coordinator in 1989 at Washington State under head coach Mike Price, he helped RB Steve Broussard to 1,237 yards with 13 TD. Quarterbacks, Aaron Garcia and Brad Gossen combined to throw for 2,963 yards with 20 TD vs 16 INT. In 1990, quarterbacks Brad Gossen and Drew Bledsoe combined to throw for 2,514 yards with 15 TD vs 7 INT.

=== Wyoming (1991–1996) ===
Tiller began his head coaching career at Wyoming in 1991, when he was hired to replace Paul Roach, who was stepping down as football coach but remained as the athletic director. Tiller received a 5-year contract with a base salary of $65,000. During his time as head coach, Tiller lead the Cowboys to a 39–30–1 (.564) record and one bowl appearance in six years. His best team was his final season in 1996, which notched a 10–2 record (7–1 in WAC play winning the Pacific Division), but was left out of a bowl after losing to BYU in the inaugural WAC Championship game—to date, the last team to finish ranked in a major poll and not receive a bowl invitation while eligible.

He continued to provide stellar quarterback and running back play despite some subpar records during his tenure at Wyoming.

- 1991: QB Tom Corontzos threw for 2,868 yards with 19 TD vs 8 INT.
- 1992: RB Dwight Driver ran for 1,027 yards with 11 TD.
- 1993: QB Joe Hughes threw for 3,135 yards with 24 TD vs 10 INT. RB Ryan Christopherson ran for 1,014 yards with 9 TD.
- 1994: QB John Gustin threw for 2,757 yards with 17 TD vs 13 INT. RB Ryan Christopherson ran for 1,455 yards with 10 TD.
- 1995: QB Josh Wallwork threw for 2,363 yards with 21 TD vs 13 INT. WR Marcus Harris had 1,423 yards with 14 TD.
- 1996: QB Josh Wallwork threw for 4,090 yards with 33 TD vs 15 INT. WR Marcus Harris had 109 catches for 1,650 yards with 13 TD.

=== Purdue (1997–2008) ===
On the strength of his final season at Wyoming, Tiller was hired by Purdue University in 1997. Tiller inherited a program that had only had five winning seasons in the previous 18 years. However, the Boilermakers made an immediate splash in the second game of his rookie season with a nationally televised upset of Notre Dame. Tiller led the Boilermakers to ten bowl berths in twelve years, most notably the 2001 Rose Bowl—their first major-bowl appearance since the Bob Griese-led Boilermakers went to the 1967 Rose Bowl, and only the second major-bowl appearance in school history. The 2000 season also saw the Boilers' first Big Ten title in 33 years.

Prior to Tiller's tenure as head coach, Purdue had played in only five bowl games, most recently in 1984 when he was the defensive coordinator. In 2008 against Central Michigan, Tiller won his 85th game at Purdue to become the winningest coach in school history, topping the previous mark set by Jack Mollenkopf (1956–1969). Tiller's "basketball on grass" offense, originated by legendary high school coach Jack Neumeier, and learned from Tiller's coaching colleagues Jack Elway and Dennis Erickson, was well renowned for its ability to score and score effectively, befuddling opposing defenses. This was especially the case when quarterback Drew Brees led the team from 1997 to 2000. His Purdue squads were shut out only once, by Penn State, in a 12–0 defeat at Ross–Ade Stadium on October 28, 2006.

Tiller retired following the 2008 season and was succeeded by former Eastern Kentucky University head coach Danny Hope. In his final game as a head coach, the Purdue Boilermakers beat their in-state rival Indiana Hoosiers in their traditional season-ending Old Oaken Bucket Game by a score of 62 to 10 at Ross–Ade Stadium.

Tiller was the first coach to use the spread offense in the Big Ten Conference, although many others have since brought their own version of the spread, including Jim Tressel at Ohio State, Randy Walker at Northwestern, Rich Rodriguez at Michigan, and Ron Zook at Illinois. Under Tiller and his spread offense, Purdue annually had one of the top offenses in the Big Ten.

== Death ==
Tiller died at his home in Buffalo, Wyoming, on September 30, 2017, at the age of 74, after battling health issues. Numerous tributes were made to Tiller following his passing by former players, fellow coaches, and former teams that he led.

== Head coaching record ==
"You turned a lot of boys into men, I thank you for that."

— Purdue University team captain Ryan Baker during the press conference following Joe Tiller's final game as head coach, November 23, 2008.

=== College ===
Year	Team	Overall	Conference	Standing	Bowl/playoffs	Coaches^{#}	AP^{°}
Wyoming Cowboys (Western Athletic Conference) (1991–1996)
1991	Wyoming	4–6–1	2–5–1	T–6th			
1992	Wyoming	5–7	3–5	T–7th			
1993	Wyoming	8–4	6–2	T–1st	L Copper		
1994	Wyoming	6–6	4–4	T–5th			
1995	Wyoming	6–5	4–4	6th			
1996	Wyoming	10–2	7–1	1st (Pacific)		22	22
Wyoming:		39–30–1	26–22–1				
Purdue Boilermakers (Big Ten Conference) (1997–2007)
1997	Purdue	9–3	6–2	T–2nd	W Alamo	15	15
1998	Purdue	9–4	6–2	4th	W Alamo	23	24
1999	Purdue	7–5	4–4	T–6th	L Outback		25
2000	Purdue	8–4	6–2	T–1st	L Rose^{†}	13	13
2001	Purdue	6–6	4–4	T–4th	L Sun		
2002	Purdue	7–6	4–4	T–5th	W Sun		
2003	Purdue	9–4	6–2	T–2nd	L Capital One	19	18
2004	Purdue	7–5	4–4	T–5th	L Sun		
2005	Purdue	5–6	3–5	8th			
2006	Purdue	8–6	5–3	T–4th	L Champs Sports		
2007	Purdue	8–5	3–5	T–7th	W Motor City		
2008	Purdue	4–8	2–6	T–8th			
Purdue:		87–62	53–43				
Total:		126–92–1					
National championship Conference title Conference division title or championship game berth
^{†}Indicates BCS bowl.; ^{#}Rankings from final Coaches Poll.; ^{°}Rankings from final AP Poll.

=== CFL ===
Team	Year	Regular season					Postseason			
Team	Year	Won	Lost	Ties	Win %	Finish	Won	Lost	Win %	Result
CAL	1976	2	3	1	.417	5th in West	-	-	-	-
Total		2	3	1	.417		-	-	-	-
