= Travis Dorsch =

American football player (born 1979)

No. 10, 15
- Position: Punter

Personal information
- Born: September 4, 1979 (age 47); San Diego, California, U.S.
- Listed height: 6 ft 6 in (1.98 m)
- Listed weight: 230 lb (104 kg)

Career information
- High school: Bozeman (Bozeman, Montana)
- College: Purdue (1998–2001)
- NFL draft: 2002: 4th round, 109th overall pick

Career history
- Cincinnati Bengals (2002); New England Patriots (2003)*; Green Bay Packers (2003); Minnesota Vikings (2004)*; → Rhein Fire (2005); New York Giants (2006)*; → Rhein Fire (2006)
- * Offseason or practice squad member only

Awards and highlights
- Ray Guy Award (2001); Consensus All-American (2001); First-team All-Big Ten (2001); All-NFL Europe (2005)

Career NFL statistics
- Punts: 5
- Punting yards: 162
- Punting average: 32.4
- Longest punt: 46
- Stats at Pro Football Reference

Travis Edward Dorsch (born September 4, 1979) is an American former professional football player who was a punter in the National Football League (NFL). He played college football for the Purdue Boilermakers, winning the Ray Guy Award and earning consensus All-American honors in 2001. He was selected by the Cincinnati Bengals in the fourth round of the 2002 NFL draft.

== Early life ==
Dorsch was born in San Diego, California. He attended Bozeman High School in Bozeman, Montana, and was a letterman in high school football, basketball, and track and field for the Bozeman Hawks. He also played four years of American Legion baseball for the Bozeman Bucks as a starting first baseman and pitcher. He holds several state records including the longest field goal in state history (fifth-longest in the national high school annals) at 63 yards.

== College career ==
While attending Purdue University in West Lafayette, Indiana, Dorsch played for both the Purdue Boilermakers football team and the Boilermakers baseball team. While playing for the Boilermakers football team from 1998 to 2001, Dorsch set many records including career scoring (355 points), career field goals (69), and career punting average (48.4). He became the first Big Ten Conference athlete to be named as a first-team all-conference selection as both a punter and a placekicker. He was recognized as a consensus first-team All-American punter, having received first-team honors from the American Football Coaches Association, Associated Press, Walter Camp Foundation and CNNSI. He also and won the Ray Guy Award for the nation's outstanding punter, and received first-team All-American honors as a placekicker from Football News and The Sporting News. He is the only athlete in Purdue history to have kicked a field goal and thrown a touchdown in football, and hit a home run and recorded a win as a pitcher in baseball.

== Professional career ==
=== Cincinnati Bengals ===
Dorsch was selected by the Cincinnati Bengals in the fourth round, with the 111th overall pick, of the 2002 NFL draft. He officially signed with the team on July 25, 2002. His only NFL game came with the Bengals in 2002. He had 5 punts, averaging just 32.4 as an injury replacement for starter Nick Harris. Dorsch was waived on August 31, 2003.

=== New England Patriots ===
Dorsch was signed to the practice squad of the New England Patriots on December 10, 2003. He was released on December 15, 2003.

=== Green Bay Packers ===
Dorsch signed with the Green Bay Packers on January 10, 2004, during the playoffs. However, he did not play in any games and was waived on July 30, 2004.

=== Minnesota Vikings ===
Dorsch was signed by the Minnesota Vikings on August 3, 2004. He was waived on August 31 and signed to the practice squad on September 7 before being released on September 21, 2004.

Dorsch signed a reserve/future contract with the Vikings on January 31, 2005. He was allocated to NFL Europe, where he played for the Rhein Fire during the 2005 NFL Europe season. He played in all 10 games for the Fire, punting 39 times for 1,676 yards and an average of 43.0, earning All-NFL Europe honors. Dorsch was waived by the Vikings on September 3, 2005.

=== New York Giants ===
Dorsch signed a reserve/future contract with the New York Giants on January 4, 2006. He was allocated to NFL Europe again in 2006, returning to play for the Fire. He appeared in all 10 games, punting 50 times for 1,921 yards and an average of 38.4. Dorsch was waived by the Giants on August 29, 2006.

== Life after football ==
Dorsch is currently an associate professor at Utah State University in Logan, Utah. He pursued graduate studies at Purdue and completed his doctorate in Sports and Exercise Psychology in 2013. After retiring from football in 2006, he has focused his competitive energies on the sport of triathlon and has finished nine Ironman races worldwide.

As a professor, Dorsch is the founding director of the Families in Sport Lab at Utah State University and has published more than 30 scholarly articles, all of which can be downloaded on his lab's website: www.FamiliesInSportLab.usu.edu

Dorsch is also head coach of the Cache Valley Ski Team (CVST).
